= List of Hong Kong films of 1996 =

This article lists feature-length Hong Kong films released in 1996.

== Box office ==
The highest-grossing Hong Kong films released in 1996, by domestic box office gross revenue, are as follows:

Highest-grossing films released in 1996
Rank	Title	Domestic gross
1	Police Story 4: First Strike	HK$57,518,795
2	The God of Cookery	HK$40,861,655
3	Forbidden City Cop	HK$36,051,899
4	Tristar	HK$25,218,130
5	Young and Dangerous 2	HK$22,494,497
6	Young and Dangerous	HK$21,141,877
7	Who's the Woman, Who's the Man?	HK$20,916,798
8	Shanghai Grand	HK$20,838,196
9	Feel 100%	HK$20,815,272
10	Young and Dangerous 3	HK$19,513,168

== Releases ==
Title	Director	Cast	Genre	Notes
1996
18 Shaolin Golden Boy	To Wai Tat			
Adventurous Treasure Island	Herman Yau			
The Age of Miracles	Peter Chan			
Ah Kam	Ann Hui	Sammo Hung, Michelle Yeoh		
All of a Sudden	Herman Yau			
Another Chinese Cop	Lam Yee Hung			
Another Piece of Romance				
Banana Club	Jimmy Shin			
Beggar King				
Best of the Best	Andrew Lau	Julian Cheung, Daniel Chan, Karen Mok, Annie Wu, Roy Cheung, Michael Tse, Jason Chu, Marianne Chan, Raymond Cho, Sammy Leung, Amanda Lee, Damian Lau	Action	
Beyond Hypothermia	Patrick Leung			
Big Bullet	Benny Chan			
Black Mask	Teddy Chan	Jet Li, Lau Ching Wan, Karen Mok		
Bloody Friday	Danny Ko	Simon Yam, Loletta Lee, Ada Choi, Elvis Tsui	Crime, mystery, thriller	
Comrades: Almost a Love Story	Peter Chan	Maggie Cheung, Leon Lai, Eric Tsang and Kristy Yang		
Dr. Wai in "The Scripture with No Words"	Ching Siu-tung	Jet Li, Rosamund Kwan, Takeshi Kaneshiro, Charlie Yeung	Action/adventure	
Ebola Syndrome	Herman Yau			
First Option	Gordon Chan			Entered into the 20th Moscow International Film Festival
The God of Cookery	Stephen Chow	Stephen Chow, Karen Mok	Comedy	
Growing Up	Cash Chin	Michael Tse, Shu Qi, Jason Chu, Jerry Lamb, Jordan Chan, Alfred Cheung, Raymond Cho	Romantic comedy	
How to Meet the Lucky Stars'	Frankie Chan	Sammo Hung, Eric Tsang, Richard Ng, Stanley Fung, Michael Miu	Action, comedy	
Lost and Found	Lee Chi-Ngai	Kelly Chen, Takeshi Kaneshiro	Romance	
Once Upon a Time in Triad Society	Cha Chuen Yee	Francis Ng, Loletta Lee		
Police Story 4: First Strike	Stanley Tong	Jackie Chan, Annie Wu, Jackson Lau		
Satan Returns	Lau Wai Lun	Donnie Yen, Chingmy Yau, Francis Ng, Dayo Wong	Action, horror, suspense	
Sex and Zen II	Chin Man-Kei	Loletta Lee, Shu Qi, Ken Lok, Ben Ng, Elvis Tsui	Erotic, romantic, comedy, drama, fantasy, horror, action	
Sexy and Dangerous	Billy Tang Hin-Shing	Loletta Lee, Marianne Chan, Francis Ng	Crime action	
Shanghai Grand	Poon Man Kit	Andy Lau, Leslie Cheung		
Street Angels	Billy Tang Hin-Shing	Chingmy Yau, Valerie Chow, Simon Yam, Michael Tao	Triads	
Street of Fury	Billy Tang Hin-Shing	Michael Tse, Louis Koo, Gigi Lai, Teresa Mak, Jerry Lamb	Crime	
The Sun Has Ears	Yim Ho			Entered into the 46th Berlin International Film Festival
Tai Chi Boxer	Yuen Woo-ping	Jacky Wu, Christy Chung, Mark Cheng, Chuen-hua Chi, Billy Chow, Sibelle Hu, Shun Lau, Darren Shahlavi, Chiu Tam, Hai Yu	Martial arts, action, romantic comedy	
Those Were the Days	Eric Tsang	Loletta Lee, Jordan Chan, Karen Mok	Comedy, drama	
Tristar	Tsui Hark	Moses Chan, Sunny Chan, Leslie Cheung, Lau Ching Wan, Anita Yuen, Michael Tse	Comedy	
Viva Erotica	Derek Yee, Law Chi-Leung	Leslie Cheung, Karen Mok	Erotic	Entered into the 47th Berlin International Film Festival
Young and Dangerous	Andrew Lau	Ekin Cheng, Jordan Chan, Francis Ng, Gigi Lai, Simon Yam, Michael Tse	Crime drama	Copyright notice: 1995.
Young and Dangerous 2	Andrew Lau	Ekin Cheng, Jordan Chan, Francis Ng, Gigi Lai, Simon Yam, Michael Tse	Crime drama	
Young and Dangerous 3	Andrew Lau	Ekin Cheng, Jordan Chan, Simon Yam, Gigi Lai, Michael Tse	Crime drama	
