= List of crime films of 1996 =

This is a list of crime films released in 1996.

Title	Director	Cast	Country	Notes
2 Days in the Valley	John Herzfeld	Danny Aiello, Greg Cruttwell, Jeff Daniels, Teri Hatcher, Glenne Headly, Marsha Mason, Paul Mazursky, James Spader, Eric Stoltz, Charlize Theron	United States	
Albino Alligator	Kevin Spacey	Matt Dillon, Faye Dunaway, Gary Sinise	France; United States	
American Strays	Michael Covert	Luke Perry, Jennifer Tilly, Eric Roberts	United States	
The Big Squeeze	Marcus de Leon	Lara Flynn Boyle, Peter Dobson, Luca Bercovici	United States	
Blood and Wine	Bob Rafelson	Jack Nicholson, Stephen Dorff, Jennifer Lopez, Judy Davis, Michael Caine	United States; United Kingdom	
Bottle Rocket	Wes Anderson	Owen Wilson, Luke Wilson, Robert Musgrave	United States	
Bound	Andy Wachowski, Larry Wachowski	Jennifer Tilly, Gina Gershon, Joe Pantoliano	United States	
Curdled	Reb Braddock	William Baldwin, Angela Jones, Bruce Ramsay	United States	
Deep Crimson	Arturo Ripstein	Regina Orozco, Daniel Jiménez Cacho, Marisa Paredes	Mexico	
Fargo	Joel Coen	Frances McDormand, William H. Macy, Steve Buscemi, Peter Stormare, Harve Presnell	United States	
Freeway	Matthew Bright	Reese Witherspoon, Kiefer Sutherland, Brooke Shields	United States	
From Dusk till Dawn	Robert Rodriguez	George Clooney, Harvey Keitel, Quentin Tarantino	United States	
Fudoh: The New Generation	Takashi Miike	Tamaki Kenmochi, Toru Minegishi, Miho Nomoto	Japan	
The Funeral	Abel Ferrara	Christopher Walken, Chris Penn, Vincent Gallo, Annabella Sciorra, Isabella Rossellini, Benicio Del Toro	United States	
Gonin 2	Takashi Ishii	Mai Kitajima, Toshiyuki Nagashima, Yui Natsukawa	Japan	
Hard Eight	Paul Thomas Anderson	Philip Baker Hall, John C. Reilly, Gwyneth Paltrow	United States	Crime drama
Helpless	Shinji Aoyama	Tadanobu Asano	Japan	
Hit Me	Steven Shainberg	Elias Koteas, Laure Marsac, Jay Leggett	United States	
Kids Return	Beat Takeshi Kitano	Masanobu Andō, Ryo Ishibashi, Kenichi Kaneko	Japan	Crime drama
Kounterfeit	John Mallory Asher	Bruce Payne, Corbin Bernsen, Hilary Swank	United States	
Last Man Standing	Walter Hill	Bruce Willis, Christopher Walken, Bruce Dern	United States	Gangster film
Mad Dog Time	Larry Bishop	Jeff Goldblum, Richard Dreyfuss, Gabriel Byrne, Ellen Barkin, Diane Lane, Gregory Hines, Kyle MacLachlan, Burt Reynolds, Henry Silva, Michael J. Pollard, Billy Idol, Billy Drago, Rob Reiner, Joey Bishop, Richard Pryor	United States	
Organ	Kei Fujiwara	Kei Fujiwara, Kimihiko Hasegawa, Yosiaki Maekawa	Japan	
Ransom	Ron Howard	Mel Gibson, Rene Russo, Gary Sinise, Delroy Lindo, Lili Taylor	United States	
The Rich Man's Wife	Amy Jones	Halle Berry, Christopher McDonald, Clive Owen	United States	Crime thriller
Set It Off	F. Gary Gray	Jada Pinkett Smith, Queen Latifah, Vivica A. Fox, Kimberly Elise, John C. McGinley, Blair Underwood	United States	
Sleepers	Barry Levinson	Kevin Bacon, Robert De Niro, Dustin Hoffman, Jason Patric, Brad Pitt, Minnie Driver, Brad Renfro, Ron Eldard, Billy Crudup	United States	
The Substitute	Robert Mandel	Tom Berenger, Ernie Hudson, Diane Venora	United States	
Swallowtail Butterfly	Shunji Iwai	Hiroshi Mikami, Chara, Ayumi Ito	Japan	Crime thriller
Underworld	Roger Christian	Denis Leary, Joe Mantegna, Annabella Sciorra	United States	
Young and Dangerous	Andrew Lau	Ekin Cheng, Jordan Chan, Gigi Lai, Francis Ng	Hong Kong	
Young and Dangerous 2	Andrew Lau	Ekin Cheng, Jordan Chan, Gigi Lai, Sandra Ng	Hong Kong	
Young and Dangerous 3	Andrew Lau	Ekin Cheng, Jordan Chan, Gigi Lai, Karen Mok	Hong Kong	Crime drama
