= Ekin Cheng discography =

This is the discography of Hong Kong actor and singer Ekin Cheng.

Note: English titles of Songs and Albums in italic indicates the name is simply a translation of the Chinese title as no official English title exists.

== Composed singles ==
Year	Title	English Title	Album	Notes
1995	To be continued		Earth	Composed by Ekin Cheng and Chan Kwong Wing.
1996	奇妙旅程	Strange Travel	如果天空要下雨 If the sky wants to rain	Composed by Ekin Cheng, lyrics by Fong Ka Wong.

== Unpublished singles ==
Year	Title	English Title	Notes
1991	Home Alone		Duet with 鄭璥基 and 蔡濟文. Ekin Cheng's first song.
1999	一往情深		Duet with Gigi Leung, theme from the musical "Summer Night Song".
1999	印象	Impression	Duet with Jordan Chan, Miriam Yeung and Gigi Leung, theme from the musical "Summer Night Song".
2002	我未夠秤	I am a minor	Sang by Stephanie Che, featuring Ekin, theme from "My Wife is 18".
2002	敢作敢為	Admit what you've done	Theme from "Running Out of Time 2".
2003	一生中最愛	The one I love in a life time	Duet with Miriam Yeung, theme from "Anna in Kung fu land".
2006	感官世界	Senses of the world	Internet release only. Theme from "Looking into Ekin’s Eyes".
2007	綠色聖誕加個橙(綠色聖誕歌)	Green Christmas plus an orange	Duet with Miriam Yeung, Stephanie Che, Jerry Lamb. Song dedicated to 一台綠色活動 function.
2008	BB戰士三國傳	Sangokuden	Cantonese, Mandarin and a combined Japanese, Mandarin and Cantonese version. Theme from the Japanese anime "Gundam Sangokuden".
2011	Beautiful Day		Theme to the Ekin Cheng 2011 Beautiful Day Concert at the Hong Kong Coliseum

== Tours ==
Year	Title	English Title	Location
1995	My Best Show		Hong Kong
1998	22098全城效應網上行演唱會	22098 Ekin in Concert	Hong Kong (Hong Kong Coliseum)
1998	Ekin Cheng and Kelly Chen Sydney Concert Tour		Australia (Sydney)
1998	Ekin Cheng and Kelly Chen Melbourne Concert Tour		Australia (Melbourne Crown Casino)
1998	鄭伊健全城效應930美加巡回演唱會	Ekin Cheng Vancouver Concert Tour	Canada (Vancouver)
1998	鄭伊健全城效應930美加巡回演唱會	Ekin Cheng Toronto Concert Tour	Canada (Toronto)
1998	Ekin Cheng Singapore Concert Tour		Singapore
1999	Ekin Cheng North American Tour		United States (Reno Hilton)
2000	风影鄭伊健上海个人演唱会	Feng Ying Shang Hai Concert Tour	China (Shang Hai)
2001	Ekin Live in Japan 001		Japan
2002	Hong Kong New Wave		Japan (Tokyo)
2004	POPアジア2004大阪まさか奥さんレポ		Japan(Osaka)
2004	POPアジア2004東京まさか奥さんレポ		Japan (Tokyo)
2004	小春X伊健好兄弟音樂會	Jordan X Ekin in Concert	Hong Kong
2008	Heart Aid 四川 東京慈善演唱會	Heart Aid Tokyo Charity Concert for Sze Chuan	Japan (Tokyo)
2009	Canon呈獻：鄭伊健友情歲月2009演唱會	Canon Presents Ekin Cheng Friends For Life 2009 Concert	Hong Kong (Hong Kong Coliseum)
2010	Canon呈獻:鄭伊健友情歲月演唱會澳門站	Canon Presents Ekin Cheng Friends For Life 2009 Concert Macau Stop	Macau (Cotai Strip CotaiArena)
2010	香港夏日流行音樂節之獅子山下演唱會	Summer Pop	Hong Kong (Hong Kong Coliseum)
2010	新城 LOVE & THE CITY 鄭伊健 X 側田 X 謝安琪音樂會	Love & The City Ekin Cheng X Justin Lo X Kay Tse	Hong Kong (AsiaWorld-Expo Bus Terminus)
2011	Canon呈獻：鄭伊健 Beautiful Day 2011 演唱會	Canon Presents Ekin Cheng Beautiful Day 2011 Concert	Hong Kong (Hong Kong Coliseum)
2012	Canon呈獻：鄭伊健 Light and Shadow 演唱會	Canon Presents Ekin Cheng Light and Shadow Concert	Hong Kong (Hong Kong Coliseum)

== Musicals ==
Year	Title	English Title	Location
1999	仲夏夜狂想曲	Summer Night Song	Hong Kong
2005	亞卡比復仇槍擊事件薄	903 id Club Sammy & Kitty Drama Show – Viva 1’amour	Hong Kong

== Albums ==
Year	Album	English Title	Label	Notes
1992	不要哭了	Don’t Cry	BMG	Cantonese
1993	撒哈拉	Sahara	BMG	Cantonese
1994	姊妹情深電影原聲帶		BMG	OST
1994	Got to be Real		BMG	Cantonese
1994	The Best Show		BMG	Cantonese (Collection CD)
1994	On Stage		BMG	Cantonese
1995	Life		BMG	Cantonese EP
1995	Earth		BMG	Cantonese
1995	My Best Show		BMG	Live concert
1996	Life II		BMG	Cantonese EP
1996	愛發狂	Frantic love for you	BMG	Mandarin EP
1996	古惑仔I之人在江湖電影原聲帶	Young and Dangerous OST	BMG	OST
1996	古惑仔II之猛龍過江電影原聲帶	Young and Dangerous 2 OST	BMG	OST
1996	古惑仔III之隻手遮天電影原聲帶	Young and Dangerous 3 OST	BMG	OST
1996	如果天空要下雨	If the sky wants to rain	BMG	Cantonese
1997	Ekin Edge Collection 兒童樂園	Ekin Edge Collection – Children playground	BMG	Single
1997	Ekin Edge Collection 熱血燃燒	Ekin Edge Collection – The burning blood	BMG	Single
1997	Ekin Edge Collection 直至消失天與地	Ekin Edge Collection – Till the end of the world	BMG	Single
1997	Ekin Edge Collection 愛發狂	Ekin Edge Collection – Frantic love for you	BMG	Single
1997	Ekin Edge Collection 友情歲月	Ekin Edge Collection – Age friendship	BMG	Single
1997	Ekin Edge Collection 如果天空要下雨	Ekin Edge Collection – If the sky wants to rain	BMG	Single
1997	Ekin Edge Collection 一個為妳甘願蹈火海的人	Ekin Edge Collection – A person willing to dive into a sea of fire for you	BMG	Single
1997	伊健‧十三	Ekin 13	BMG	Cantonese (Collection CD)
1997	Eternity		BMG	Cantonese EP
1997	97古惑仔戰無不勝電影原聲帶	Young and Dangerous 4 OST	BMG	OST
1997	The Best Show 2		BMG	Cantonese (Collection CD)
1997	偏愛你	Love you only	BMG	Mandarin
1998	風雲之雄霸天下電影原聲帶	The Storm Riders OST	BMG	OST
1998	初夏之戀	My Paper Ring	BMG	Cantonese with Short Length Movie
1998	初夏之戀	My Paper Ring	BMG	Mandarin with Short Length Movie
1998	SENSES		BMG	Cantonese
1998	22098全城效應演唱會	22098 Ekin in Concert CD	BMG	Live concert
1998	98古惑仔龍爭虎鬥電影原聲帶	Young and Dangerous 5 OST	BMG	OST
1999	雙面人	Face to Face OST	BMG	OST
1999	中華英雄電影原聲帶	A Man Called Hero OST	BMG	OST
1999	極速傳說電影原聲帶	The Legend of Speed OST	BMG	OST
1999	戲中戲精選	Movie In Movie Collection CD	BMG	Cantonese (Collection CD)
1999	Ekin Magic		BMG	Cantonese
1999	Together		BMG	Cantonese
2000	東京攻略電影原聲帶	Tokyo Raiders OST	BMG	OST
2000	珍重伊健十年精選	Treasure	BMG	Mandarin(Collection CD)
2000	Beautiful Life		BMG	Cantonese
2000	勝者為王電影原聲帶	Born to Be King (aka Young and Dangerous 6) OST	BMG	OST
2001	古惑仔最強精選	Young and Dangerous Best Collection	BMG	Cantonese (Collection CD)
2001	The Best Show 3		BMG	Cantonese (Collection CD)
2001	Myself		EEG	Cantonese
2004	Discover		BMG	Cantonese (Collection CD)
2009	Friends for life		BMG	Cantonese (3 Collection CD)
2011	鄭伊健 Beautiful Day 2011 演唱會	Ekin Cheng Beautiful Day 2011 Concert	Lamb Production Ltd, East Asia Ent.	Cantonese (2 Collection CD)

== Others ==
A list of collection albums of various Hong Kong singers including Ekin Cheng.

Year	Album	English Title	Label	Featuring	
2001	100% 正版	100% Original		愛難留	Love is hard to flow
2001	鴿子園廣播劇	Pigeon Garden Radio Drama	Commercial Radio Productions HK		Chrysanthemum
2005	903 id club 森美小儀歌劇團亞卡比槍擊事件 – 愛情萬歲	903 id Club Sammy & Kitty Drama Show – Viva 1’amour	Warner Music Hong Kong	忘了我是誰 Wings of desire	Forget Who I am Wings of desire
2005	男人魅	All about men	Universal Music	隨時候命 (Theme from "Always Ready")	Always Ready
2005	愛情已死	Heartbreak	BMG	內傷, 甘心替代你	Internal Injury, Willing to replace you
2006	英皇冠軍精選 (Vol.2)	EEG Number One Hits Selection Vol 2	EEG	一個人戀愛	One person in Love
2006	終成眷屬	Take My Hand	Warner Music Hong Kong	一生愛你一個	Only Love you in a life time
2006	影歌集 – 25年香港經典電影歌曲	Movie Theme Songs Collection	Universal Music	友情歲月 (Theme from "Young and Dangerous 1")	Age Friendship
2007	熱爆BPM	Best BPM		極速, 22098全城效應	Speed, 22098 Entire City Reacts
2007	同一首歌	The Same Song	BMG	直至消失天與地	Till the end of the world
2008	金曲精選 (LPCD 45)	Jin Qu Jing Xuan (LPCD 45)	BMG	一生愛你一個	Only Love you in a life time
2008	我 ... 真的受傷了	I'm Hurt	BMG	仍能情深愛上, 一生愛妳一個	Still deeply in love, Only Love you in a life time

== Karaoke ==
Year	Title	English Title	Label	Format
1994	映畫館 1	Ekin Cheng Karaoke Music Video 1	BMG	LD
1994	鄭伊健MTV個人专集	EKin Cheng MTV Collection	BMG	LD
1995	My Best Show Live		BMG	LD/VCD
1996	映畫館 2	Ekin Cheng Karaoke Music Video 2	BMG	LD/VCD
1997	映畫館 3	Ekin Cheng Karaoke Music Video 3	BMG	LD/VCD
1998	22098全城效應演唱會卡拉OK	22098 Ekin in Concert Karaoke	BMG	LD/VCD/DVD
1999	映畫館 4	Ekin Cheng Karaoke Music Video 4	BMG	VCD/DVD
2001	鄭伊健卡拉OK精選	Ekin Cheng Karaoke Compilation	BMG	VCD
2004	小春×伊健好兄弟音樂會卡拉OK	Jordan X Ekin in Concert Karaoke	BMG	VCD/DVD
2007	Superstar巨星Karaoke系列之鄭伊健	Sony BMG Superstar Karaoke Series – Ekin Cheng	BMG	DVD
2011	鄭伊健 Beautiful Day 2011 演唱會	Ekin Cheng Beautiful Day 2011 Concert	Lamb Production Ltd, East Asia Ent.	Blu-ray/DVD

== Featuring karaoke ==
A list of karaoke compilation of various Hong Kong Singers including Ekin Cheng.

Year	Title	English Title	Label	Format	Featuring	
1999	BMG 齊齊開心Vol. 8卡拉OK	BMG Happy Together Music Video Karaoke Vol.8	BMG	VCD/DVD		
1999	BMG齊齊開心 Vol.10	BMG Happy Together Music Video Karaoke Vol.10	BMG	VCD/DVD		
2001	BMG Karaoke Hits Vol.1		BMG	VCD		
2001	英皇盛世 Karaoke Vol.3	EEG Karaoke VCD Vol.3	EEG	VCD/DVD	一起飛, 愛情歲月	Fly together, Age Love
2003	陳小春演唱會 Karaoke	Jordan 36 Live Road + Rhythm Karaoke	BMG	VCD/DVD	疾瘋	
2003	英皇 3 週年慈善演唱會暨	EEG’s 3rd Anniversary Charity Show Karaoke	EEG	VCD	親情	Family relations
2006	英皇冠軍精選 Karaoke (Vol. 2)	EEG Number One Hits Selection Karaoke (Vol.2)	EEG	VCD/DVD	一個人戀愛	One Person in love
2007	古巨基 Magic Moments Concert 2007 Karaoke	Leo Ku Magic Moments Concert 2007 Karaoke	Gold Label Entertainment Ltd	VCD/DVD	友情歲月	Age friendship

== Featuring MTVs ==
A list of music videos that Ekin Cheng starred in.

Year	Title	English Title	Singer	Notes
1989	無奈那天	Too bad on that day	Faye Wong	
2001	Delete		R.Envy	Ekin stars in a Korean music video for a Korean Girls Group.
2003	情急自禁	Can't resist my feelings	Chiu Chung Yu	This is Chiu Chung Yu’s debut song.
2005	可惜他有女朋友	He already has a girl friend	Niki Chow	In return for the favour, Niki Chow guest starred in Ekin’s Don’t let me See Him short music clip.
