= Ekin Cheng radio dramas =

== Radio Dramas ==
This is the list of radio dramas featuring Hong Kong actor and singer Ekin Cheng.

Note: English titles in italic indicates the name is simply a translation of the Chinese title as no official English title exists.

Year	Title	English Title	Radio Station	Role	Cast
1994	讓我愛你一個夏天	Let me love you this summer	Commercial Radio Hong Kong		Ekin Cheng, Vivian Chow, Nicholas Wu, 江希文
1996	百份百感覺	Feel 100% Radio Drama	Commercial Radio Hong Kong	Jerry	Ekin Cheng, Sammi Cheng, Eric Kwok, Gigi Leung
1997	愛情無處不在	Love is everywhere	Metro Broadcast Corporation Limited		Ekin Cheng, Eric Suen, 施念慈, 滕麗明
1997	今夕是何夜		Metro Broadcast Corporation Limited		Ekin Cheng
1998	風雲	The Storm Riders radio drama	Commercial Radio Hong Kong	聶風 Whispering Wind	Ekin Cheng, Aaron Kwok
1998	太陽溶化了她那雙蠟做的翅膀	The sun melted her candle made wings	Commercial Radio Hong Kong	Icarus	Ekin Cheng, Sammi Cheng
1998	娛樂滿天愛情劇		Commercial Radio Hong Kong	阿健 Kin	Ekin Cheng, Gigi Leung, 周國豐
1998	一往情深		Commercial Radio Hong Kong	阿健 Kin	Ekin Cheng, Gigi Leung, 周國豐
1999	中華英雄	A Man Called Hero radio drama	Commercial Radio Hong Kong	華英雄 Hero Hua	Ekin Cheng, Jordan Chan, Shu Qi
2000	Bad Boys 特工	Bad Boys Only radio drama	Commercial Radio Hong Kong	陳恩勁 King	Ekin Cheng, Louis Koo, Jerry Lamb, Kristy Yeung, Shu Qi
2000	戀愛味緣		Metro Broadcast Corporation Limited	何大明	Ekin Cheng, 陳慧珊,快必,陳振安, Prima
2000	鴿子園	Pigeon Garden	Commercial Radio Hong Kong	柳明樹	Ekin Cheng, Andy Lau, Miriam Yeung, 森美,小儀,吳君如,少爺占
2000	靈幻搜奇		Commercial Radio Hong Kong		Ekin Cheng
2002	落入凡間的天使(三)		Commercial Radio Hong Kong	香從二	Ekin Cheng, Candy Lo, Jordan Chan
unknown	白襪世界		Commercial Radio Hong Kong		Ekin Cheng
