= Young and Dangerous =

Young and Dangerous may refer to:

- Young and Dangerous (film series), a collection of Hong Kong films about a group of young triad members
  - Young and Dangerous (1996 film), a Hong Kong crime film
  - Young and Dangerous: The Prequel, a 1998 Hong Kong crime film
- Young and Dangerous (1957 film), an American drama film
- Young & Dangerous (album), a 2018 album by the Struts
