= We're No Bad Guys =

1997 Hong Kong film by Wong Jing

- Film poster
- Traditional Chinese: 愛上百份百英雄
- Simplified Chinese: 爱上百份百英雄
- Directed by: Wong Jing
- Written by: Wong Jing
- Produced by: Manfred Wong; Andrew Lau
- Starring: Ekin Cheng; Jordan Chan; Gigi Leung; Vivian Hsu
- Cinematography: Miu Kin-Fai
- Edited by: Marco Mak
- Music by: Chan Kwong-wing
- Production company: B.O.B. and Partners
- Distributed by: Golden Harvest; Mei Ah Film Productions
- Release date: 25 September 1997
- Running time: 101 minutes
- Country: Hong Kong
- Language: Cantonese
- Box office: HK $7,386,850.00

We're No Bad Guys aka. We Are No Bad Guys (愛上百份百英雄) is a 1997 Hong Kong action film directed by Wong Jing.

== Synopsis ==
Plane (Ekin Cheng), a troubled cop who hits the skids when his girlfriend Carrie (Gigi Leung) is killed by a stoic hitman named Angel (Alex Fong). One year later he finds himself saddled with new partner Turkey (Jordan Chan), an immature cop who is in love with up-and-coming idol singer Tinny Chung (Vivian Hsu). There are the usual growing pains as the two partners learn to like and trust one another. Plane meets Tinny's friend Mandy, her looks resemble Carrie's and they fall in love. Angel then returns to settle old scores.

== Cast ==
- Ekin Cheng - Plane
- Jordan Chan - Turkey Chu
- Gigi Leung - Carrie / Mandy
- Vivian Hsu - Tinny Chung
- Alex Fong Chung-Sun - Angel
- Law Kar-ying - Bond Chu
- Meg Lam Kin-Ming - Plane's mom
- Michael Chan Wai-Man - Officer Mike
- Jue Wing-Lung
- Berg Ng - Golden Teeth
- William Duen Wai-Lun - Officer Pei
- Spencer Lam
- Lee Siu-kei - Chan Chi Fook
- Lee Kin-yan - Robert
- Ricky Yi Fan-Wai - Officer Tim
