= For Bad Boys Only =

2000 Hong Kong film by Raymond Yip

- Film poster
- Traditional Chinese: Bad Boy特攻
- Simplified Chinese: Bad Boy特攻
- Hanyu Pinyin: Bad Boy Tè Gōng
- Jyutping: Bad Boy Dak6 Gung1
- Directed by: Raymond Yip
- Screenplay by: Manfred Wong
- Produced by: Manfred Wong
- Starring: Ekin Cheng; Louis Koo; Shu Qi; Kristy Yang; Daniel Chan
- Cinematography: Lai Yiu-fai
- Edited by: Danny Pang Phat
- Music by: Chan Kwong-wing; Ken Chan
- Production companies: FBI TV and Film Group
- Distributed by: Universe Entertainment
- Release date: 15 December 2000
- Running time: 105 minutes
- Country: Hong Kong
- Language: Cantonese
- Box office: HK$7,266,320

For Bad Boys Only is a 2000 Hong Kong science fiction action romantic comedy film directed by Raymond Yip and starring Ekin Cheng, Louis Koo, Shu Qi, Kristy Yang and Daniel Chan.

== Plot ==
"For Bad Boys Only" is an unconventional detective agency which specializes in helping clients to search for reunite with their first loves. The agency is managed by King Chan (Ekin Cheng), a flirty Casanova, and his partner, Jack Shum (Louis Koo), a perfectionist, with King's younger sister, Queen (Kristy Yang), who has a soft spot for Jack, being the only employee. Recently, Taiwanese tycoon Yung Wing-hing (Ko I-chen) hires the agency to search for his ex-lover, Koon Ching (Shu Qi), whom was Asia's premier female air force pilot. At the same time, a young man named Tin-ngai also hires the agency to search for his missing girlfriend, Shadow (Shu Qi). To King and Jack, Koon Ching and Shadow look strangely identical. Making matters more bizarre, King meets an amnesic girl named Eleven (Shu Qi), who also looks identical to Shadow and Koon Ching. The amorous-natured King also falls in love with Eleven. While searching for Eleven's true identity, King and Eleven were attacked multiple times before Eleven was captured by a group of gun-wielding mysterious men. At the same time, Tin-ngai also finds Shadow, who was disfigured. It turns out that Shadow was captured by Japanese scientist Taro Sakamoto (Mark Cheng), who retrieved DNA from Koon Ching's body and injected into Shadow, hoping to create a female pilot with similar skills. However, the experiment failed and Shadow was disfigured. However, Tin-ngai's love for Shadow did not change and decides to spend the rest of his life with her.

After King and Jack learns of this, they proceed to rescue Eleven. The two of them successfully sneak into Sakamoto's base, where they find dozens of clones that look identical to Eleven, each of them with different mutations. They were all named by numbers, with Eleven being the only perfect experiment with no mutations. However, Sakamoto manipulates Eleven to go mad to kill King and Jack.

== Cast ==
- Ekin Cheng as King Chan
- Louis Koo as Jack Shum
- Shu Qi as Eleven / Koon Ching / Shadow
- Kristy Yang as Queen Chan
- Daniel Chan as Tin-ngai
- Gigi Lai as Tiny
- Mark Cheng as Taro Sakamoto
- Jerry Lamb as Yung's henchman
- Ko I-chen as Yung Wing-hing
- Blackie Ko as Dark Tung
- Frankie Ng as Police Officer
- Law Lan as Sophia
- Kong Hon as Gabie
- Sammy Leung as Sammy
- Kitty Yuen as Yee
- Kelly Lin as Angel
- Josie Ho as Jean
- Stephanie Che as Marie
- Anya Wu as DJ
- Vincent Kok as Tiny's ex-boyfriend
- Chan Yuk-fong
- Kelly Chen
- Lee Tat-chiu as Policeman
- Leon Head

== Reception ==
=== Critical ===
LoveHKFilm gave the film a negative review criticizing Manfred Wong's script as "overstuffed, underdeveloped, and embarrassing" and its "failed attempt" at charm and humor. Andrew Saroch of Far East Films gacve the film a score of 3 out of 5 stars criticizing its uninvolving romances and characters, poor camerawok, but praises some of its special effects.

=== Box office ===
The film grossed HK$7,266,320 at the Hong Kong box office during its theatrical run from 15 December 2000 to 4 January 2001.
