= Lam Sheung Yee =

Hong Kong footballer and actor (1934–2009)

- Born: 14 December 1934; Hong Kong
- Died: 23 April 2009 (aged 74); North Point, Hong Kong
- Occupations: actor; footballer; sport commentator
Association football career
- Full name: Spencer Lam Sheung Yee
- Position: Defender
Senior career*
Years	Team	Apps	(Gls)
1944–1948	Eastern		
1948–1962	Kitchee		
1962–1963	Five-One-Seven		
1963–1964	Kitchee		
1964–1965	KMB		
1965–1967	Yuen Long		
1967–1970	Eastern		
1970–1972	Hong Kong Rangers		
1972–1973	Eastern		
International career
1958–1968	Republic of China		
Medal record
Men's football
Representing Taiwan
Asian Games
Gold medal – first place	1958 Tokyo
- * Club domestic league appearances and goals

Spencer Lam Sheung Yee (Chinese: 林尚義; Jyutping: lam^{4} soeng^{6} ji^{6}; 14 December 1934 – 23 April 2009) was a football defender, coach and announcer, as well as an actor.

Spencer was a graduate of the Chinese University of Hong Kong with an economics major. He was once a secondary school teacher in Hong Kong while working as a voice actor on television advertisements and a football player. At an international level, he represented the Republic of China in 1960 Olympics football in Rome.

== Football career ==
As a footballer, he was nicknamed Chinese: 重炮; lit. 'Heavy Gun' due to his powerful clearances and long-range free kicks from between 20 and 40 yards), but it also had a lot to do with the materials used on the match balls are a lot heavier than the ones being used nowadays. He also had another nickname Chinese: 倉魚; lit. 'pale fish'. He represented Republic of China instead of Hong Kong, despite both teams being founding members of the Asian Football Confederation in 1954.

=== Honours ===
Hong Kong Rangers

- 1971/72 Hong Kong Senior Challenge Shield Champion
- 1971/72 Hong Kong First Division League Champion
- 3x Asian Football Confederation winners

Republic of China

- Asian Games: Gold medal, 1958

== Acting career ==
He also developed an acting career garnering 48 credits from 1992 to 2004. He is most remembered for roles in Young And Dangerous where he played a priest and Karen Mok's father, Sunshine Cops and Your Place Or Mine.

== Partial filmography ==
- Fight Back to School II (1992) - Judo Teacher
- Gameboy Kids (1992) - Police Captain
- Murder (1993) - Jessica's Boss
- Gwok chaan Ling Ling Chat (1994) - Football Commentator (voice)
- Dream Lover (1995) - Television Commentator
- Young and Dangerous (1996) - Father Lam
- Sexy and Dangerous (1996) - Fly Head
- Young and Dangerous 2 (1996) - Father Lam
- Satan Returns (1996) - The Reverend
- Once Upon a Time in Triad Society (1996) - Sheung-Yee
- Street Angels (1996) - Barrister Lam
- Big Bullet (1996) - Dan
- Young and Dangerous 3 (1996) - Father Lam
- Feel 100% (1996) - Principal
- War of the Underworld (1996) - Mao
- Da nei mi tan zhi ling ling xing xing (1996) - Sun Ng-Hung / Lam Sheung-Yee
- Bodyguards of the Last Governor (1996) - Bao
- Rebekah (1996)
- Till Death Do Us Laugh (1996) - Yan
- Passionate Nights (1997) - Head of Security Agency
- Black Rose II (1997) - Lui Kei
- Young and Dangerous 4 (1997) - Father Lam
- Lawyer Lawyer (1997) - Priest
- Killing Me Tenderly (1997) - Su-Kan's Superior
- We're No Bad Guys (1997) - Bomb Squad Man
- 03:00 A.M. (1997) - Dr. Tso
- Chao ji wu di zhui nu zai 2 zhi gou zai xiong xin (1997)
- Midnight Zone (1997) - Uncle Seven (first segment)
- Beyond Time Space Want Love (1998)
- B gai waak (1998) - Lam
- Haunted Mansion (1998) - The Professor
- Your Place or Mine! (1998) - Leung Shiu, Wai's Father (Simon)
- Wai Goh dik goo si (1998)
- The Conman (1998) - Football commentator
- Afraid of Nothing, the Jobless King (1999)
- Prince Charming (1999) - Wah's Dad
- Horoscope 1: The Voice from Hell (1999) - Jojo's Grandfather
- The Sunshine Cops (1999) - H2O's father
- My Loving Trouble 7 (1999)
- Born to Be King (2000) - Father Lam
- Blue Moon (2001)
- You Shoot, I Shoot (2001) - Mr. Tse
- Women from Mars (2002)
- The Twins Effect (2003) - Jackie's father
- Dragon Loaded 2003 (2003) - Gold's father
- Fantasia (2004) - TV commentator
- Herbal Tea (2004) - Tinibal Carl Chiu (final film role)
