= The Duel (2000 film) =

2000 Hong Kong film by Andrew Lau

- Film poster
- 決戰紫禁之巔
- Directed by: Andrew Lau
- Screenplay by: Wong Jing; Manfred Wong
- Based on: Juezhan Qianhou by Gu Long
- Produced by: Wong Jing; Manfred Wong
- Starring: Andy Lau; Ekin Cheng; Nick Cheung; Kristy Yang; Zhao Wei; Patrick Tam
- Cinematography: Andrew Lau
- Edited by: Marco Mak
- Music by: Chan Kwong-Wing
- Production company: Win's Entertainment
- Distributed by: China Star Entertainment Group; Win's Entertainment; BoB and Partners
- Release date: 3 February 2000
- Running time: 106 minutes
- Country: Hong Kong
- Language: Cantonese
- Box office: HK$21.3 million

The Duel (決戰紫禁之巔) is a 2000 Hong Kong wuxia comedy film loosely adapted from the novel Juezhan Qianhou of the Lu Xiaofeng Series by Gu Long. Directed by Andrew Lau, it starred Andy Lau, Ekin Cheng, Nick Cheung, Kristy Yang, Zhao Wei, and Patrick Tam.

== Synopsis ==
Dragon Nine, an imperial detective, is on his way back after concluding the case of the Thief Ghost. He encounters "Sword Saint" Yeh, who asks him to tell "Sword Deity" Simon to meet him for a duel on the night of the full moon at the highest rooftop of the Forbidden Palace. News of the upcoming duel between the two greatest swordsmen spread and attract much attention, with people starting to place bets on the final outcome. The Emperor sends Dragon Nine and Princess Phoenix to stop the duel from taking place and investigate whether it is a mask for any sinister plots.

== Cast ==
- Andy Lau as Yeh Cool Son (Ye Gucheng)
- Ekin Cheng as Snow Blower Simon (Ximen Chuixue)
- Nick Cheung as Dragon Nine (Lu Xiaofeng)
- Zhao Wei as Princess Phoenix
- Kristy Yang as Ye Ziqing (Sun Xiuqing)
- Tien Hsin as Jade
- Patrick Tam as the Emperor
- Norman Chui as "Thief Ghost" Ling Wun-hok
- Elvis Tsui as Gold Moustache
- Jerry Lamb as Dragon Seven
- Frankie Ng as Dragon Five
- Ronald Wong Ban as Dragon Six
- Lee Sheung-man as Shek Tsi-lun
- Wong Yat-fei as Minister
- Liu Wei as Eunuch Lau Tong
- Jing Gangshan as Tong Fei
- Yin Xiaotian as Tong Ngo
- Geng Le as Yim Tsi-chun
- Yang Haiquan as Siu Tsi-chung
