= Lethal Angels =

2006 Hong Kong film by Cheng Wai-man

- Film poster
- Directed by: Steve Cheng Wai-man
- Written by: Pang Wai
- Produced by: Charles Heung; Gao Fengjun; Manfred Wong
- Starring: Tien Hsin; Cherrie Ying; Jordan Chan; Andy On; Hua Wei
- Cinematography: Joe Chan
- Production companies: China Star Entertainment Group; Film Business International; Tianjin Film Studio
- Release date: 17 March 2007
- Running time: 97 minutes
- Country: Hong Kong
- Language: Cantonese

Lethal Angels (Chinese: 魔鬼天使), also known as Naked Avengers, is a 2006 Hong Kong action film starring Taiwanese actress Tien Hsin. The titular "lethal angels" are a group of female assassins led by Winnie (Jewel Lee). The other killers are played by Cherrie Ying, Viva Wei, and Meme Tian. The male lead is Andy On, with Jordan Chan in a supporting role, both playing police officers. The film is directed by Steve Cheng Wai-man.

== Cast ==
- Tien Hsin
- Cherrie Ying
- Jordan Chan
- Andy On
- Hua Wei
- Fei Lei

== See also ==
- Naked Weapon
- Naked Killer
