= Sausalito (film) =

2000 Hong Kong film by Andrew Lau

- DVD cover
- Traditional Chinese: 一見鍾情
- Simplified Chinese: 一见钟情
- Directed by: Andrew Lau
- Written by: Chan Sap-sam
- Produced by: Jessinta Liu
- Starring: Leon Lai; Maggie Cheung
- Cinematography: Andrew Lau; Jacky Tang
- Edited by: Danny Pang
- Music by: Chan Kwong-wing
- Distributed by: BoB and Partners Co. Ltd.
- Release date: 20 April 2000
- Running time: 98 minutes
- Country: Hong Kong
- Language: Cantonese
- Box office: HK$15,136,981

Sausalito a.k.a. Love at First Sight (Chinese: 一見鍾情) is a 2000 Hong Kong romantic drama film directed by Andrew Lau, and starring Leon Lai and Maggie Cheung. The film was released on April 20, 2000 by BoB and Partners Co. Ltd.

== Plot ==
Mike is the founder of an internet company and has a cynical personality, while Ellen is a divorcée raising her son Scott alone in San Francisco. They meet by chance and fall in love at first sight. Ellen's unconditional devotion moves Mike, and the two begin living together.

However, after some time, they realize that their worldviews differ. At this point, Mike's company encounters financial difficulties, which becomes the trigger for cracks in their relationship, and they decide to break up. A year later, a major earthquake strikes San Francisco. In the face of danger, the first thing each of them thinks about is the other's safety, and they risk everything to go out into the streets to search for each other.

After this ordeal, they realize how deeply they love one another. Later, as Mike's financial situation improves, he buys a house and lives together with Ellen.

== Cast ==
- Leon Lai as Mike
- Maggie Cheung as Ellen
- Eric Kot as Bob
- Richard Ng as Robert
- Suki Kwan as Tina
- Scott Leung as Scott
- Valerie Chow as Virginia Chow
- Saisie M. Jang as Mel G
- AnnieScott Rogers as Wealthy Lady
- Alan Draven as Taxi driver
- Mark Hefti as Tony
- Carl Ng as Mike's friend
- Jed Rowen as Homeless Man
- Edmund Oscar Tam as Kid's Friend
- Karl-Heinz Teuber
- Theresa Walsh as Hot girl in bar
- Tamara Torres as Bus stop patron (uncredited)
- Jude S. Walko as Fillmore groupie (uncredited)
- Jeffrey Lei as Taxi driver (credited as King Kong)

== See also ==
- Love at first sight
