= Those Were the Days... (2000 film) =

2000 Hong Kong film by Raymond Yip

- DVD cover
- Directed by: Raymond Yip
- Written by: Manfred Wong
- Produced by: Manfred Wong
- Starring: Jordan Chan; Gigi Leung; Michael Tse; Jerry Lamb; Jason Chu; Ekin Cheng; Kristy Yang; Anthony Wong
- Cinematography: Lai Yiu-fai
- Edited by: Marco Mak
- Music by: Chan Kwong Wing
- Production companies: Film Business International Ltd. Sheen Melody Ltd.
- Distributed by: Jing's Production Limited
- Release date: 31 March 2000 (Hong Kong)
- Running time: 103 minutes
- Country: Hong Kong
- Language: Cantonese

Those Were the Days... (Chinese: 友情歲月之山雞故事) is a 2000 Hong Kong film directed by Raymond Yip. The film is a spin-off/prequel of the Young and Dangerous film series, as it follows the life of Chicken Chiu (Jordan Chan) before he joined the triads with the boss Chan Ho Nam (Ekin Cheng), Chou-pan (Jason Chu) and Cheung May Yun (Kristy Yang).

== Cast ==
- Jordan Chan – Chicken Chiu Shan-Ho
- Gigi Leung – Lok Wing-Gee
- Michael Tse – Dai Tin-Yee
- Jerry Lamb – Pou-pan
- Jason Chu – Chou-pan
- Ekin Cheng – Chan Ho-Nam
- Kristy Yang – Cheung May Yun
- Anthony Wong – Tai Fei
- Vincent Wan – Ben Hon
- Sandra Ng – Sister 13
- Lee Siu-kei – Kei
- Bill Chan
- Ng Chi Hung – Uncle Bee (uncredited)

== See also ==
- List of Hong Kong films
