= Street Angels (1996 film) =

1996 Hong Kong film by Billy Tang

- Film poster
- Directed by: Billy Tang Hin-Shing
- Written by: Manfred Wong; Wong Jing
- Produced by: Andrew Lau; Manfred Wong
- Starring: Chingmy Yau; Valerie Chow; Simon Yam; Michael Tao
- Cinematography: Tony Miu
- Edited by: Angie Lam
- Music by: Bon Wong
- Production company: BoB and Partners Co. Ltd.
- Release date: 7 June 1996
- Running time: 90 minutes
- Country: Hong Kong
- Language: Cantonese
- Box office: HK$8.3 million

Street Angels (Chinese: 紅燈區) is a 1996 Hong Kong film directed by Billy Tang Hin-Shing.

== Cast and roles ==
- Chingmy Yau - Tung Yen
- Elvis Tsui - Moro
- Linda Cheung - Pidan / Black Beauty
- Maria Cordero - Singer in Number One Club (cameo)
- Michael Tao - Brother Man
- Simon Yam - Walkie Pi
- Shu Qi - Ming-Ming
- Spencer Lam - Barrister Lam
- Valerie Chow - Karen
