= Portland Street Blues =

1998 Hong Kong film by Yip Wai-man

- Film poster
- Traditional Chinese: 古惑仔情義篇之洪興十三妹
- Simplified Chinese: 古惑仔情义篇之洪兴十三妹
- Directed by: Yip Wai Man
- Written by: Manfred Wong; Patrick Kong
- Produced by: Manfred Wong; Raymond Chow; Wong Jing
- Starring: Sandra Ng; Kristy Yang; Alex Fong Chung-Sun; Wan Yeung Ming; Shu Qi
- Cinematography: Lai Yiu-fai
- Edited by: Marco Mak
- Music by: Andrew Tuason
- Distributed by: Golden Harvest
- Release date: 21 February 1998
- Running time: 120 minutes
- Country: Hong Kong
- Language: Cantonese
- Box office: $4,261,745

Portland Street Blues (古惑仔情義篇之洪興十三妹) is a 1998 Hong Kong film directed by Yip Wai Man. The film is a spin-off of the Young and Dangerous series of films, with the story focusing on a female character.

== Synopsis ==
In a criminal underworld dominated by men, Sister Thirteen of the "Hung Hing" triad faces trials and tribulations as she rises to become the branch leader of Portland Street. The story also examines her past and lesbian self-acceptance, as well as the "Tung Sing" triad and how the relationship between her and Ben Hon develops.

== Cast ==
- Sandra Ng Kwan Yue as Sister Thirteen/Tsui Siu Siu
- Kristy Yang as Cheung May Yun (as Kristy Yeung)
- Alex Fong Chung-Sun as Coke
- Wan Yeung-ming as Ben Hon (credited as Vincent Wan)
- Shu Qi as Scarface
- John Ching as S.O.B.
- Ekin Cheng as Chan Ho-Nam
- Jason Chu as Banana Skin
- Jerry Lamb as Pou-Pan
- Ng Man Tat as Tat
- Ken Lo as Prince
- Matt Chow
- Kam Hing Ying
- Kwan Hoi-Shan
- Lee Siu-kei
- Ng Chi Hung as Uncle Bee
- Francis Ng as Ugly Kwan
- Peter Ngor
- Jimmy Wong Ga Lok
- Bobby Yip
- Henry Yue Young

- Notable absences from previous Young and Dangerous films : Chicken, Dai Tin-Yee, Tai Fei and Chairman Chiang.

== Awards and nominations ==
18th Hong Kong Film Awards

- Won: Best Actress (Sandra Ng)
- Won: Best Supporting Actress (Shu Qi)
- Nominated: Best Supporting Actress (Kristy Yang)

35th Golden Horse Awards

- Won: Best Supporting Actress (Shu Qi)
- Nominated: Best Actress (Sandra Ng)
