= Haunted Mansion (1998 film) =

1998 Hong Kong film by To Lai-chi

- DVD cover art
- Traditional Chinese: 香港第1凶宅
- Simplified Chinese: 香港第1凶宅
- Hanyu Pinyin: Xiāng Gǎng Dì Yī Xīong Zhái
- Jyutping: Hoeng1 Gong2 Dai6 Jat6 Hung1 Zaak6
- Directed by: To Lai-chi
- Written by: To Lai-chi
- Produced by: Wong Jing
- Starring: Gigi Lai; Anthony Wong; Law Lan
- Cinematography: Pang Jun-wai
- Edited by: Cheng Keung
- Music by: Francis Wai
- Production company: Wong Jing's Workshop Ltd.
- Release date: 18 September 1998
- Running time: 90 minutes
- Country: Hong Kong
- Language: Cantonese

Haunted Mansion is a 1998 Hong Kong horror film directed and written by To Lai-chi, produced by Wong Jing, and starring Anthony Wong, Gigi Lai and Law Lan.

== Plot ==
Gigi and her husband, Fai, move into her old family mansion in a village at Yuen Long to join her mother and her sister, Fan.

While moving in, they meet a feng shui professor, Tin Bo Chiu, who tells them that their mansion is located in an inauspicious location – an intersection of the yin and yang worlds – so it is likely to attract ghosts. He also warns them that the power of the protective charms set up around the mansion is fading, so they should leave the mansion within seven days or they will get into trouble. Gigi and Fai ignore him.

Strange things start happening. Gigi's mother is senile, but one night she appears normal and chats with Gigi. Ghosts kidnap Fai's spirit and refuse to let him leave until he wins a rigged game of mahjong; a ghost possesses his body in the meantime. Fan also gets possessed by another ghost. The phone also rings frequently but no one is on the line and apparently only Gigi hears the ringing.

At one point, a businessman shows up and tries to force Gigi's family to sell the land to him but they refuse. He then sends two thugs to burn down the mansion, but the thugs are scared away by ghosts. The businessman is later mysteriously strangled to death while his wife is sexually assaulted by an unseen force.

Gigi seeks help from her boss, Uncle Ming, who lends her a pair of magic glasses which confirm that Fai and Fan are possessed by ghosts. Tin Bo Chiu also points out to Gigi that her non-senile mother she saw that night was actually her mother's spirit, which can temporarily leave her body and remains unaffected by her mental condition. As Gigi's mother used to be a ghostbuster, they summon her spirit out of her body and seek help from her. Gigi's mother tells them the paranormal events are actually linked to the vengeful ghost of Gigi's aborted daughter, who has been instigating other ghosts to help her take revenge on her mother.

With help from her mother's spirit and Uncle Ming, Gigi saves Fai and Fan, and makes peace with her daughter's ghost, who forgives her for aborting her. Gigi and Fai decide to have another child.

== Cast ==
- Anthony Wong as Fai
- Gigi Lai as Gigi
- Law Lan as Gigi's mother
- Spencer Lam as Uncle Ming
- Shirley Cheung as Fan
- James Lee as Tin Bo Chiu
