= Once a Gangster =

2010 Hong Kong film by Felix Chong

- Film poster
- Directed by: Felix Chong
- Screenplay by: Lau Ho-leung
- Story by: Chapman To; Felix Chong; Lau Ho-leung
- Produced by: Alan Mak
- Starring: Ekin Cheng; Jordan Chan
- Cinematography: Davy Tsou
- Edited by: Andy Chan
- Music by: Ken Chan
- Production companies: Media Asia Films; Pop Movies
- Distributed by: Media Asia Distribution
- Release date: 20 May 2010
- Running time: 95 minutes
- Country: China (Hong Kong)
- Language: Cantonese

Once a Gangster (simplified Chinese: 飞砂风中转; traditional Chinese: 飛砂風中轉 is a 2010 Hong Kong crime comedy film directed by Felix Chong.

== Plot ==
Gang leader Kerosene discovers that a new recruit is a talented cook and gives him the nickname Roast Pork. When Kerosene becomes the new don, he sets up a chain of restaurants under Roast Pork's control. Years later, Roast Pork's wife wants him to separate from the gang. Due to Kerosene's overwhelming debt, Roast Pork suggests passing the role of don to someone else and letting that person handle the debt. Scissors wants to become don, but the other gang members are against it because they know that his top thug Yan is a police informant. Kerosene wants Roast Pork to be the next don, but Roast Pork's wife is against it, so Roast Pork sets a fire on the sidewalk in front of a bank in order to be arrested and miss the pending election, but other gang members take responsibility for the action and enable Roast Pork to escape.

Lady Pearl, granddaughter of the gang's founder Iron Bodyguard, objects to Roast Pork's nomination as the next Don because the position was promised to her son Swallow by Uncle Tsa in return for Swallow serving a 20-year sentence for a gang killing he performed. Uncle Tsa suggests that the person who retrieves the gang's symbol, the Dragon Tail Baton, from the police should be made the next Don. Swallow is uninterested in the position and wants to go to college instead, but his interview with Hong Kong University is sabotaged by his faithful underlings and his mother, who needs him to remain in the gang so that she has a source for her various drug habits.

Roast Pork pays to have fake Dragon Tail Batons made out of the wood from an antique chair. The items switch hands many times between warring groups of gang members and ultimately Roast Pork and Swallow each arrive at the gang's headquarters with their own Dragon Tail Baton. Uncle Tsa can't remember which one is real, so the two contenders battle for the position of don, shooting and killing each other. Scissors arrives with his own Dragon Tail Baton and is made the new don. After Scissors leaves, Roast Pork and Swallow reveal to Pearl that they faked their deaths. Yan and the police arrest Scissors, the new don.

== Cast ==
- Ekin Cheng as Swallow
- Jordan Chan as Roast Pork
- Alex Fong as Kerosene
- Michelle Ye as Nancy
- Candice Yu as Lady Pearl
- Wilfred Lau as Yan
- Conroy Chan as Scissors

== Release ==
The film was released in Hong Kong on 20 May 2010.
