= Young and Dangerous: The Prequel =

1998 Hong Kong film by Andrew Lau

- Film poster

Chinese name
- Traditional Chinese: 新古惑仔之少年激鬥篇
- Simplified Chinese: 新古惑仔之少年激斗篇
Transcriptions
Yue: Cantonese
- Jyutping: san1 gu2 waak6 zai2 zi1 siu3 nin4 gik1 dau3 pin1
- Directed by: Andrew Lau
- Written by: Manfred Wong
- Produced by: Manfred Wong; Wong Jing
- Starring: Nicholas Tse; Daniel Wu; Benjamin Yuen; Francis Ng; Shu Qi; Sam Lee; Frankie Ng
- Cinematography: Andrew Lau
- Edited by: Marco Mak
- Music by: Clarence Hui; Ronald Ng
- Distributed by: Gala Film Distribution Limited; BoB and Partners Co. Ltd.
- Release date: 5 June 1998
- Running time: 116 minutes
- Country: Hong Kong
- Language: Cantonese
- Box office: $2,353,800

Young and Dangerous: The Prequel (Chinese: 新古惑仔之少年激鬥篇) is a 1998 Hong Kong crime film directed by Andrew Lau. It is the second prequel in the Young and Dangerous film series.

The film shows Chan Ho-nam (Nicholas Tse), Big Head (Daniel Wu), Chow Pan (Benjamin Yuen), Chicken Chiu (Sam Lee), and their friends being recruited by Uncle Bee (Ng Chi-Hung) and joining the "Hung Hing" triad.

== Cast ==
- Nicholas Tse as Chan Ho-nam
- Daniel Wu as Big Head
- Francis Ng as Ugly Kwan
- Shu Qi as Fei
- Sam Lee as Chicken
- Sandra Ng as Sister 13 (cameo)
- Kristy Yang as Yung (cameo)
- Benjamin Yuen as Chow Pan

== Notes ==
Because he was only 17, and born on 29 August 1980, Nicholas Tse is not allowed to watch the movie when the movie opens in Hong Kong cinemas on 5 June 1998 because this movie is classified as Category III, which is a restricted category in the Hong Kong motion picture rating system and the category is strictly for persons aged 18 and above only.

The story retcons the flashback from the first film, taking place in 1988 rather than 1985.

== Awards and nominations ==
18th Hong Kong Film Awards

- Won: Best New Performer (Nicholas Tse)
