= Young and Dangerous 3 =

1996 Hong Kong film by Andrew Lau

- DVD cover
- Directed by: Andrew Lau
- Written by: Manfred Wong
- Produced by: Manfred Wong
- Starring: Ekin Cheng; Jordan Chan; Gigi Lai; Jason Chu; Jerry Lamb; Michael Tse; Halina Tam; Karen Mok; Simon Yam; Anthony Wong; Roy Cheung
- Cinematography: Andrew Lau
- Edited by: Marco Mak; Ma Ko
- Music by: Clarence Hui; Ronald Ng
- Distributed by: Gala Film Distribution Limited; BoB and Partners Co. Ltd.
- Release date: 29 June 1996
- Running time: 98 minutes
- Country: British Hong Kong
- Languages: Cantonese; Chaozhao; English

Young and Dangerous 3 (Chinese: 古惑仔之隻手遮天) is a 1996 Hong Kong triad film directed by Andrew Lau. It is the second sequel in the Young and Dangerous film series. Starting from this movie, it is distributed by Golden Harvest Company.

== Plot ==
Weeks after Chan Ho Nam (Ekin Cheng) is elected branch leader of Causeway Bay of the "Hung Hing" Society, "Chicken" Chiu (Jordan Chan), best friends Banana Skin (Jason Chu), Pou-pei (Jerry Lamb), Dai Tin-yee (Michael Tse) and K.K. (Halina Tam) after joining the Taiwanese "San Luen" triad, is reinstated into Hung Hing by Chairman Chiang Tin Sung (Simon Yam). At the same time, rival triad "Tung Sing", led by "Camel" Lok (Chan Wai Man) begins to make a name for itself, establishing bars and clubs alongside Hung Hing's areas of operations. Things become heated when Tung Sing member "Crow" (Roy Cheung) fuels a deep-seated rivalry between him and Ho Nam, with the threat of open war between the two societies. Meanwhile, Ho Nam's stuttering girlfriend Smartie (Gigi Lai), who was critically injured in a vehicular accident and slipped into a coma, reawakens but with no prior memories to her meeting with Ho Nam for the first time. Regardless, Ho Nam assures her he and his friends will protect her. Meanwhile, Father "Lethal Weapon" Lam (Spencer Lam) introduces his daughter Shuk Fan (Karen Mok) to Chicken, having been good friends and a source of advice for him.

During a business trip to Amsterdam with his mistress and Ho Nam, Chairman Chiang is assassinated by thugs. While the rest of Hung Hing believes the hit was orchestrated by Ho Nam, it is the deranged Crow who ordered the chairman's death, using Chiang's mistress to falsify evidence, framing Ho Nam. While Ho Nam goes into hiding back in Hong Kong, Crow is reprimanded by Camel; to add to his insanity, Crow kills his own boss and makes it look like a Hung Hing assassination. Drunk with power, Crow wants nothing more than to destroy Hung Hing and orders his men to search frantically for Ho Nam, who is quick to realize the ambush and escapes with Smartie, until Crow's men manages to separate the two. In their attempt, Smartie is captured but suffers a blow to the head, restoring her memories. Crow tells Ho Nam if he wants his name cleared and his woman back, he must meet him alone.

The crazed Crow does not keep his word and kills Smartie in cold blood in front of Ho Nam. Just as Crow is about to finish him, Chicken bursts in, armed with a vest full of grenades, and reaches a stalemate with Crow to ensure Ho Nam's safety. The saddened Ho Nam carries Smartie's body out with him and gives her a proper funeral. Now fueled solely on vengeance, Ho Nam decides to march into Tung Sing territory and kill Crow at Camel's funeral haphazardly. Ho Nam's friends and the rest of Hung Hing manage to capture and threaten Tung Sing member "Tiger" (Ng Chi Hung), who tells all of Crow's madness in killing both their societies' leaders. Crow is left nowhere to run from his enemies, and in the midst of a Hung Hing/Tung Sing brawl, he is killed in the funeral pyre. With Crow dead, Tung Sing is left in disarray, and Hung Hing re-establishes control in its territories.

== Cast ==
- Ekin Cheng - Chan Ho Nam
- Jordan Chan - Chicken Chiu
- Gigi Lai - Smartie / Stammer
- Jason Chu - Banana Skin
- Jerry Lamb - Pou-pan
- Michael Tse - Dai Tin-yee
- Halina Tam - K.K.
- Karen Mok - Shuk-Fan / Wasabi
- Simon Yam - Chiang Tin-Sung
- Anthony Wong Chau-sang - Tai Fai
- Roy Cheung - Crow
- Ng Chi Hung - Tiger
- Spencer Lam - Father Lam
- Chan Wai-Man - Camel Lok
- Blackie Ko - Blackie Ko Chi-Wah
- Law Lan - Granny
- Victor Hon - Uncle Eight Fingers
- Lee Siu-kei - Key
- Danny Chan Kwok Kwan - Gangster
- Samuel Leung - Fat Sze
- Nelson Wai Chow - 14K Gangster
- Brendan Chow - Black Boy
- Oscar Au - Retard Boy (9 Long)

== See also ==
- Young and Dangerous
