= Afraid of Nothing, the Jobless King =

1999 Hong Kong film by Joe Ma

- VCD cover
- Traditional Chinese: 失業皇帝
- Simplified Chinese: 失业皇帝
- Hanyu Pinyin: Shī Yè Huáng Dì
- Jyutping: Sat1 Jip6 Wong4 Dai3
- Directed by: Joe Ma
- Screenplay by: Joe Ma
- Produced by: Jimmy Heung; Lee Kwok-hung
- Starring: Gallen Lo; Gigi Leung; Eric Kot; Sam Lee; Wayne Lai
- Cinematography: Chan Chi-ying
- Edited by: Cheung Ka-fai
- Music by: Cacine Wong
- Production companies: Win's Entertainment; Brilliant Idea Group; Cameron Entertainment
- Distributed by: Mei Ah Entertainment
- Release date: 1 January 1999
- Running time: 106 minutes
- Country: Hong Kong
- Language: Cantonese
- Box office: HK$3,677,605

Afraid of Nothing, the Jobless King is a 1999 Hong Kong comedy film written and directed by Joe Ma and starring Gallen Lo and Gigi Leung.

== Plot ==
Ten Outstanding Young Persons precipitant Ha Kong (Gallen Lo) was originally the chief executive officer of Tung Enterprises. However, when the corporate chairman (Lam Sheung Yee) of Tung Enterprises died from a heart attack, Tung Se (David Lee), the son of the chairman, in an attempt to seize power of the company, hires thugs to knock Kong unconscious and causing Kong to be absent from work for three days, which causes Kong to violate his employment contract and was fired as a result.

Since Kong has becomes homeless, he temporary moves in with Chu Jing (Eric Kot), a beggar who helped Kong after he woke up from his coma. Due to high unemployment rates during the financial crisis at the time, Kong was unable to find work and poses as a beggar with Jing's family. While begging in the streets, Kong meets a kind-hearted girl named Law Nam (Gigi Leung). Kong does his best to pursue Nam and win her sympathy, and lies to her about him a younger brother who is a beggar. Eventually, Kong was able to make a comeback under Nam's emotional appeal and collaborates with a well-known American pharmaceutical factory. However, Nam was furious for Kong's deception and decides to marry Kong's rival, Se. At Nam and Se's wedding, Kong finally takes his revenge.

== Cast ==
- Gallen Lo as Ha Kong
- Gigi Leung as Law Nam
- Eric Kot as Brother Chu Jing
- Sam Lee as Brother Iron Chu
- Wayne Lai as Mrs. Law's manager
- Philip Keung as Darkie
- Liz Kong as Sau
- Chan Man-lei as Jing's dad
- Alice Fung So-bor as Mrs. Law
- Bowie Wu as Ha Kong's rich godfather
- Lam Sheung Yee as Director Tung
- David Lee as Tung Se
- Matt Chow as Se's assistant
- Lam Suet as Se's thug
- Alice Pang as Law Nam's cousin
- Ng Ka-wai as Mrs. Law's worker
- Wilson Yip as Mrs. Law's worker
- Chin Wing-wai as Mrs. Law's worker
- Monica as Se's girlfriend at hospital
- Elsa Chan as Se's girlfriend at hospital
- Lau Chi-san
- Erica Yuen
- Marianne Choi
- Kingson Shek as AV boss
- Lee Kim-wing as Se's thug
- Felix Chong as Job interviewer
- Andy Tsang as Beggar posing in kung fu costume
- Derek Kwok as Beggar posing in kung fu costume
- Yau Hau-ngai as Mrs. Law's worker
- Wong Chi-yuk as Mrs. Law's worker
- Chan Hing-hang as Mrs. Law's worker
- Leslie Au as Seller of Sloppy
- Chow Au-ming as Peter
- Chui Si-yui as Mary
- Ma Yuen
- Gary mak as Doctor
- Tam Tin-bo as Passerby donating money
- Hui Si-man as Tung Se's wedding guest
- Cheung Yuk-wah as Tung Se's wedding guest
- Johnnie Guy as Mr. Woody
- Fei Wah as Hotel manager
- Dee Gor as Paul
- Steven Lau as Bank manager

== Reception ==
=== Critical ===
Love HK Film gave the film a mixed review praising it as "humorous" with "some grating moments" but criticizes the plot as "haphazard".

=== Box office ===
The film grossed HK$3,677,605 at the Hong Kong box office during its theatrical run from 1 to 21 January 1999.
