= Dragon in Jail =

1990 Hong Kong film by Kent Cheng

- Film poster
- Traditional Chinese: 獄中龍
- Simplified Chinese: 狱中龙
- Hanyu Pinyin: Yù Zhōng Lóng
- Jyutping: Jeok6 Zung1 Lung4
- Directed by: Kent Cheng
- Screenplay by: Nam Yin
- Produced by: Eddy Chan
- Starring: Andy Lau; Kenny Ho; Gigi Lai
- Cinematography: Abdul M. Rumjahn
- Edited by: Wong Ming-lam; Chan Kei-hap
- Music by: Lowell Lo
- Production company: Legend Films
- Distributed by: Newport Entertainment
- Release date: 27 September 1990
- Running time: 101 minutes
- Country: Hong Kong
- Language: Cantonese
- Box office: HK$10,451,120

Dragon in Jail is a 1990 Hong Kong action film directed by Kent Cheng and starring Andy Lau, Kenny Ho and Gigi Lai.

== Plot ==
Wayne Cheung (Kenny Ho) is a rich heir who impulsively committed a crime because he was unable to accept the fact that his mother remarried. After being sentenced to prison, he is bullied by his inmates but is helped by his roommate Henry (Andy Lau), whom he befriends. After release, Wayne goes to study law in Britain while Henry joins the triads due to his family environment. Two years later, Cheung returns and becomes a lawyer while Henry also becomes a gang leader. Due to his conflict with another triad leader Charlie Ma (William Ho), Henry's pregnant wife Winnie (Gigi Lai) is raped and killed. Henry later takes revenge on Ma, and although successful, he is imprisoned again and Wayne becomes his defensive lawyer. With the help of Wayne and his friend Skinny (John Ching), will Henry be released from prison?

== Cast ==
- Andy Lau as Henry Tse
- Kenny Ho as Wayne Cheung
- Gigi Lai as Winnie Sung
- Lung Fong as CK Chong
- John Ching as Skinny
- William Ho as Charlie Ma
- Melvin Wong as Prison officer
- Tomi Wong as Wayne's mother
- Wai Kei-shun as Wayne's stepfather
- Victor Hon as Henry's father
- Lam Yin-ming as Mandy
- Lam Chung as Sergeant Fung
- Stephen Chang
- Shing Fuk-on as Brother Bull
- Leung Kam-san as Sean Man Cheung Hung
- Law Shu-kei as Judge
- Lau Yuk-kei as Peter
- Yeung Kin-wai
- Jimmy Sin
- Lee Chun-kit as Sergeant Fung's assistant
- Kong Foo-keung as Triad
- Gary Chan
- Gloria Lam
- Fung Chi-sing
- Billy Lam
- Lit Foo
- Rolf Chow
- Cheung Kwong-lun
- Kong Kin-san
- Yam Hok-chung
- Tse Kai-ming
- Lam Che-chung
- Wong Leun-cheung
- Xie De-ming
- Ho Chi-moon
- Simon Cheung
- KK Wong
- Chun Kwai-po as Thug
- Cheung Siu
- Choi Sai
- Wong Man-chun

== Theme song ==
- Red Angel (紅塵天使) (Cantonese) / Mistakes Are Inevitable (難免有錯) (Mandarin)
  - Composer: Steve Chow
  - Lyricist: Keith Chan (Cantonese) / He Qi Hong (Mandarin)
  - Singer: Andy Lau

== Box office ==
The film grossed HK$10,451,120 at the Hong Kong box office during its theatrical run from 27 September to 24 October 1990 in Hong Kong.

== See also ==
- Andy Lau filmography
