= To Live and Die in Tsimshatsui =

1994 Hong Kong film by Andrew Lau

- Film poster
- Traditional Chinese: 新邊緣人
- Simplified Chinese: 新边缘人
- Hanyu Pinyin: Xīn Biān Yuán Rén
- Jyutping: San1 Bin1 Jyun4 Jan4
- Directed by: Andrew Lau
- Written by: Roy Szeto
- Produced by: Wong Jing
- Starring: Jacky Cheung; Tony Leung Ka-fai; Jacklyn Wu; Power Chan; Gigi Lai; Roy Cheung; Shing Fui-On
- Cinematography: Cheung Man-po
- Edited by: Angie Lam
- Music by: Jonathan Wong
- Production company: Upland Films Corporate
- Distributed by: Wong Jing's Workshop
- Release date: 13 August 1994
- Running time: 100 minutes
- Country: Hong Kong
- Language: Cantonese
- Box office: HK$9,192,146

To Live and Die in Tsimshatsui is a 1994 Hong Kong crime film directed by Andrew Lau and starring Jacky Cheung, Tony Leung Ka-fai, and Jacklyn Wu. The film (sometimes referred to as New Edge Man) is said to be a remake of a film titled Man on the Brink.

== Plot ==
Crazy Lik and his friend Pong are two undercover cops who are sent to infiltrate triad leader Coffin Sing. Later as Sing is killed, the gang is split into two. Lik follows Hung Tai's side and Pong goes to the other. Lik becomes down as he is separated from his best friend and feeling responsible for Sing's death. This leads to a time where Lik gets drunk at his girlfriend Moon's mother's birthday party and making a fool of himself and Moon feels disgusted and leaves him. One time in a bar, Lik meets triad member Milky Fai, who helps Lik out to get good with Hung Tai and his sister Po. Milky Fai is actually a former undercover cop who has his own problems. Later on, Lik must decide whether or not to betray the triad brothers he has grown very close to completing the case for his superior whom he really hates and who is hitting on his girlfriend.

== Cast ==
- Jacky Cheung as Crazy Lik
- Tony Leung Ka-fai as Milky Fai
- Jacklyn Wu as Siu Po
- Power Chan as Pong
- Gigi Lai as Moon
- Roy Cheung as Hung Tai
- Shing Fui-On as Uncle On
- Kwong Wah as Officer Suen
- Hung Yan-yan as Bald rascal
- Frankie Ng as Father Man
- Bobby Yip as Man in brothel (uncredited)
- Yuen Bun as SDU officer
- Joan Tong as Fai's ex-wife
- Parkman Wong as Coffin Sing
- Sandra Ng as woman in movie (uncredited)
- Mimi Chu as Moon's mother
- Koo Ming-wah as Tai's thug
- Chan Chi-fai as Brother Bau
- William Chu as Milky Fai's son
- Hung Siu-wan as triad girl
- Yee Tin-hung as one of Man's goons
- Sung Poon-chung as triad
- Bowie Lau as Tai's thug
- Tam Kon-chung as Tai's thug
- Hau Woon-ling
- Jacky Cheung Chun-hang as Tai's thug
- John Cheung
- Wong Chi-keung as cop
- Gary Mak as cop
- Lam Foo-wai as Bau's thug
- Chun Kwai-bo as Bau's thug
- So Wai-nam as Tai's thug
- Lam Kwok-kit as Man's thug
- Mei Yee
- Wong Hoi-yiu as gambler
- Simon Cheung as cop
- Tenny Tsang as policeman

== Box office ==
The film grossed HK$9,192,146 at the Hong Kong box office in its theatrical run from 13 August to 7 September 1994 in Hong Kong.

== Award nomination ==
- 14th Hong Kong Film Awards
  - Nominated: Best Actor (Jacky Cheung)

== See also ==
- Jacky Cheung filmography
- Wong Jing filmography
