= Once Upon a Time in Triad Society =

1996 Hong Kong film by Cha Chuen-yee

- VCD cover
- Traditional Chinese: 旺角揸Fit人
- Simplified Chinese: 旺角揸Fit人
- Hanyu Pinyin: Wàng Jiǎo Zhā Fit Rén
- Jyutping: Wong6 Gok6 Zaa1 Fit Jan4
- Directed by: Cha Chuen-yee
- Screenplay by: Rico Chung
- Produced by: Cha Chuen-yee; Rico Chung; William Wu
- Starring: Francis Ng; Loletta Lee; Lam Sheung Yee
- Cinematography: Peter Ngor
- Edited by: Angie Lam
- Music by: Johnny Yeung
- Production companies: Concept Link Productions; Uni Film Production
- Distributed by: Newport Entertainment
- Release date: 23 May 1996
- Running time: 100 minutes
- Country: Hong Kong
- Language: Cantonese
- Box office: HK $4,416,130.00

Once Upon a Time in Triad Society (旺角揸Fit人) is a 1996 Hong Kong action film produced and directed by Cha Chuen-yee. The film is a spin-off of the Young and Dangerous film series, focusing on the character of Ugly Kwan, played by Francis Ng.

== Cast and roles ==
- Francis Ng as Brother Kwan
- Loletta Lee as Restaurant / Cart Noodle
- Allen Ting as Lam Fung
- Edmond So as So Wai
- Farini Cheung as Tailor's Daughter
- Pauline Chan as Nurse
- Lam Sheung Yee as Brother Sheung-yee / Kwan's father
- Michael Chan as Brother Lone
- Jamie Luk as Officer Lam
- Jeffrey Lam as Triad boss
- Danny Ko
- Lam Kee-to as Newspaper editor
- Winnie Wong
- Sze Lau-wa as Kwan's lawyer
- Ringo Chan as Yakuza boss
- Samuel Leung as Brother Andy
- Ho Pak-kwong as Tailor
- Jimmy Wong
- Pan Chang-jiang
- Airi Ando
- Chan kam-pui as Giant
- Chan Hing-hang as Triad boss
- Simon Cheung as Policeman
- Bobby Yip as Loan shark Wong
- Ridley Tsui as Comic book hero
- Kenji Tanigaki as Japanese thug
- So Wai-nam as Kwan's thug
- Lam Kwok-kit as One of Kwan's hired killers
- Anthony Carpio as One of Kwan's hired killers
- Ding Ning
