= Beach Girl =

Single by Pat Boone
- B-side: "Little Honda"
- Released: 1964
- Recorded: 1964
- Genre: Pop
- Length: 2:00
- Label: Dot
- Songwriter(s): Bruce Johnston; Terry Melcher
- Producer(s): Terry Melcher

Pat Boone singles chronology
"Don't You Just Know It" (1964)	"Beach Girl" / "Little Honda" (1964)	"Baby Elephant Walk" (1965)

"Beach Girl" is a song by Pat Boone that reached number 72 on the Billboard Hot 100 in 1964. He also performed it on the Ed Sullivan Show.

== Track listing ==
7" single (Dot 45-16658, 1964)
No.	Title	Writer(s)	Length
1.	"Beach Girl"	B. Johnston; T. Melcher	2:32
2.	"Little Honda"	Brian Wilson	2:00

== Charts ==
Chart (1964)	Peak position
US Billboard Hot 100	72
