= Young and Dangerous (film series) =

Hong Kong film series

Young and Dangerous film series
- Young and Dangerous DVD cover

Chinese name
- Traditional Chinese: 古惑仔電影系列
Transcriptions
Standard Mandarin
- Hanyu Pinyin: Gǔ Huò Zái
Yue: Cantonese
- Jyutping: Gu2 Waak6 Zai2
- Directed by: Andrew Lau; Cha Chuen Yee; Raymond Yip; Kant Leung
- Screenplay by: Manfred Wong; Sharon Hui; Cha Chuen Yee; Patrick Kong; Lee Siu-kei; Cheung Kwok Yuen
- Story by: Cowman (Man Kai-ming); Dicky Yau
- Produced by: Andrew Lau; Manfred Wong; Raymond Chow; Wong Jing; Cha Chuen Yee; Rico Chung; William Wu; Lee Siu-kei; Siu Wah
- Starring: Ekin Cheng; Jordan Chan; Gigi Lai; Jason Chu; Peter Ho; Roy Cheung; Shu Qi; Jerry Lamb; Chin Kar-lok; Michael Tse; Francis Ng; Kristy Yang; Anthony Wong; Simon Yam; Alex Man; Sandra Ng; Vincent Wan; Ken Lo
- Cinematography: Andrew Lau; Lai Yiu-fai; Kwong Tin Wo
- Edited by: Marco Mak; Ma Ko; Angie Lam; Danny Pang
- Music by: Clarence Hui; Ronald Ng; Chan Kwong-wing; Peter Ngor; To Chi Chi; Tommy Wai; Samuel Leung
- Distributed by: Golden Harvest; San Bo
- Country: Hong Kong
- Language: Cantonese

The Young and Dangerous film series (Chinese: 古惑仔電影系列) is a collection of Hong Kong films about a group of young triad members, detailing their adventures, dangers and growth in a Hong Kong triad society. The series is based on a popular comic book series known as Teddy Boy (古惑仔).

The series contributed a lot to the public image of triads and was condemned by certain quarters as glorifying secret triad societies. However, it was immensely popular in Hong Kong and spawned nine sequels and spin-offs. Its main actors and actresses have also become major stars in their own right.

Andrew Lau served as cinematographer and director for parts 1, 2, 3, 4 and 5 as well as the spinoff Born to Be King and the prequel film, with radio personality Manfred Wong writing scripts for the ongoing franchise.

== The Series ==
=== Andrew Lau ===
==== The Young and Dangerous Saga (1996–2000) ====
- Young and Dangerous (Chinese: 古惑仔之人在江湖) (1996)

Young and Dangerous tells the story of Chan Ho Nam (Ekin Cheng), "Chicken" Chiu (Jordan Chan), Dai Tin-Yee (Michael Tse), Pou Pan (Jerry Lam), his brother Chow Pan (Jason Chu) and Smartie (Gigi Lai) during their inclusion into the "Hung Hing" Society. The focus is on internal squabbling within the triad, spearheaded by "Ugly Kwan" (Francis Ng).

- Young and Dangerous 2 (Chinese: 古惑仔之猛龍過江) (1996)

The story in Young and Dangerous 2 is told in two parts: the first focuses on Chicken and his exile in Taiwan skipped over in the first film. The second half deals with the Hung Hing Society trying to ally with Chicken's Taiwanese triad "San Luen". The character "Banana Skin" (Jason Chu) is recruited into Ho Nam's circle. At the same time, an election to obtain the branch leadership status of Causeway Bay is underway, with Chan Ho Nam as its prime candidate, until a rivalry breaks out between him and another Hung Hing member, "Tai Fei" (Anthony Wong).

- Young and Dangerous 3 (Chinese: 古惑仔之隻手遮天) (1996)

Chan Ho Nam and Chicken are back again in Young and Dangerous 3, this time taking on the rival "Tung Sing" triad, who is attempting to usurp Hung Hing influence in Hong Kong by having Tung Sing member "Crow" (Roy Cheung) frame Ho Nam for the murder of Hung Hing chairman Chiang Tin Sang (Simon Yam). On the plus side, Chicken finds a new love interest in Wasabi (Karen Mok), the daughter of the comedic priest, Father "Lethal Weapon" Lam.

- Young and Dangerous 4 (Chinese: 97古惑仔之戰無不勝) (1997)

When the branch leader position is open for Tuen Mun, Chicken decides to run for it and is up against fellow Hung Hing member "Barbarian", who resorts to ruthless Tung Sing member "Thunder Tiger" (Roy Cheung) for help in his candidacy. The triad also has to deal with finding a new chairman to the Hung Hing Society, Chiang Tin Yeung (Alex Man), Chiang Tin Sang's older brother, who resides in Thailand. Young and Dangerous 4 also brings in new characters first appearing among the Hung Hing ranks, such as "Sister 13" (Sandra Ng), Ben Hon (Vincent Wan) and "Prince" (Ken Lo).

- Young and Dangerous 5 (Chinese: 98古惑仔之龍爭虎鬥) (1998)

Although Chicken does not make an appearance, Chan Ho Nam finds a new love interest in the form of Mei Ling (Shu Qi) and Big Head (Chin Kar-lok). Meanwhile, Tung Sing returns to cause trouble again for Hung Hing, in the form of new leader Szeto Ho Nam (Mark Cheng). Young and Dangerous 5 occurs during the transfer of Hong Kong sovereignty to China, with the "boys" becoming "men", as they develop and mature into more business-like dealings.

- Young and Dangerous: The Prequel (Chinese: 新古惑仔之少年激鬥篇) (1998)

Showcasing the earlier years of Chan Ho Nam (Nicholas Tse), Big Head (Daniel Wu), Chow Pan (Benjamin Yuen) and Chicken (Sam Lee), this prequel tells of their time during their willingness to follow Hung Hing's "Uncle Bee".

- Born to Be King (Chinese: 古惑仔之勝者為王) (2000)

Born to Be King, also known as Young and Dangerous 6, is the last and final instalment to the mainstream franchise and characters. This film is a return to form for the series with what is considered a fitting end by fans. Chicken is set to marry Nanako (Anya), the daughter of Japanese yakuza son Akira Kusaraki (Roy Cheung), Jason (Jason Chu) and Lui Fu-kwan (Peter Ho) to tie relationships between the Taiwanese San Luen triad and Kurasaki's clan. When Chicken is set up and framed again for murder, he seeks his old friends from Hung Hing to clear his name.

=== Cha Chuen-yee ===
- Once Upon a Time in Triad Society (Chinese: 旺角揸Fit人) (1996)

The story of a gangster "Ugly Kwan" (Francis Ng)'s rise and fall in the Triads. This is a sort of spin-off from the Young and Dangerous series. While Ng is basically reprising his role as Ugly Kwan from Young and Dangerous 1 and the priest from the series (Lam) makes an appearance, their ends don't mesh with the Y&D storyline.

- Once Upon a Time in Triad Society 2 (Chinese: 旺角揸Fit人2) (1996)

Not a continuation of the original, the sequel stars Ng in the role of Dagger who has a reputation for being good with fighting. In reality his reputation has been overblown by rumours and he uses his wit to get out of lethal situations.

=== Yip Wai Man ===
- Portland Street Blues (Chinese: 古惑仔情義篇之洪興十三妹) (1998)

Portland Street Blues is the first spin-off to the franchise, providing a different contrast to the familiar Young and Dangerous films with more character development. This time, the story's focus centres on "Sister 13". In a triad underworld dominated by men, the film tells the story of how she faces the trials and tribulations of rising to become the Hung Hing's branch leader of Portland Street, and her willingness to forgo a heterosexual relationship. The film also gives more details and insights on the rival Tung Sing triad and the mutual friendship between Sister 13 and Ben Hon.

- Those Were The Days... (Chinese: 古惑仔之山雞的故事) (2000)

This semi-prequel/spin-off follows the life of Chicken before he joined the Hung Hing triad. The film co-stars Gigi Leung as Chicken's childhood friend and Kristy Yang as Cheung May Yun.

=== Kant Leung ===
- The Legendary 'Tai Fei' (Chinese: 古惑仔激情篇洪興大飛哥) (1999)

In another spin-off, after Tai Fei obtains branch leadership status of North Point in Young and Dangerous 4, he discovers he has a son. Worse yet, his son is a member of the hated Tung Sing triad, now dealing in narcotics.

- Sexy and Dangerous 2 (2000)

Sequel to the first spin-off

=== Felix Chong ===
- Once a Gangster (Chinese: 飛砂風中轉) (2010)

Once a Gangster is a 10th year anniversary spin-off parody. This film does not directly follow the mainstream plot. The film is an action comedy. Both Ekin Cheng and Jordan Chan are starred in the film as "Sparrow" and "Roast Pork".

=== Billy Hin-Shing Tang ===
- Sexy and Dangerous (1996)

A spin-off from the series, the story follows new characters centered around a group of four women (Marble, Fai, Van, Little Star) who are involved with the triad based in Kowloon. The story also features a man named George wooing Marble, who is secretly the love interest of the famous triad leader Brother One, whom Van has a love interest in as well. The relationship between Marble and Brother One attracts jealousy of Brother One's ex-girlfriend, Aids. Aids enlists the gang led by her godbrother named Lurcher to antagonize Marble & her associates. The police officer from the first 'Young and Dangerous' movie makes a cameo.

=== Jingle Ma Chor-Sing ===
- Goodbye Mr. Cool (Chinese: 古惑仔之九龍冰室) (2001)

Goodbye Mr. Cool is the successor of the Young and Dangerous film series. Ekin Cheng and Karen Mok are starred in the film as "Dragon" and "Queen of the Underworld". The plot follows a retired triad leader (Cheng) whose life of crime has been traded for a waiter's apron at the Kowloon Cafe. Queen of the Underworld (Mok) seduces Dragon back to the crime business. Though Dragon is reluctant to go back, it's only a matter of time before he plays a key role in a bloody gang war.

=== Daniel Chan Yee-Heng ===
- Young and Dangerous: Reloaded (古惑仔之江湖新秩序) (2013)

This film is a reboot to the series. On a dark Mong Kok night, May, the cousin of Dai Tin-Yee (Dominic Ho), is gang raped and murdered by Med King (Deep Ng) and his men. The furious Tin-Yee, together with his buddies, Chan Ho Nam (Him Law), Chicken (Oscar Leung), Pou-Pan (Jazz Lam) tracked down Med King to revenge May's death. As Med King was under the wing of Ugly Kwan (Sammy Sum), a leader of the Hung Hing triad, Kwan gave orders to get rid of Ho-Nam by all means....

== Cast includes ==
- Ekin Cheng as Chan Ho Nam
- Jordan Chan as Chicken / Little Chicken (Those Were The Days)
- Gigi Lai as Smartie / Rong Yu (Born to Be King)
- Jason Chu as Chow Pan (1) / Banana Skin (2–5) / Jason (Born to Be King)
- Roy Cheung as Crow (3) / Thunder Tiger (4) / Akira Kusaraki (Born to Be King)
- Shu Qi as Mei Ling (5) / (Born to Be King)
- Jerry Lamb as Pou Pan
- Chin Kar-lok as Big Head (5) / (Born to Be King)
- Michael Tse as Dai Tin-Yee / Michael (Born to Be King)
- Francis Ng as Ugly Kwan
- Kristy Yang as Cheung May Yun (Portland Street Blues) / (Those Were The Days)
- Anthony Wong as Tai Fei (2–5)
- Simon Yam as Chiang Tin Sang (1–3)
- Alex Man as Chiang Tin Yeung (4–5) / (Born to Be King)
- Vincent Wan as Ben Hon (4–5) / (Born to Be King)
- Sandra Ng as Sister 13 (4–5) / (Born to Be King)
- Ken Lo as "Prince"
- Peter Ho as Lui Fu-Kwan (Born to Be King)
