= Young and Dangerous 2 =

1996 Hong Kong film by Andrew Lau

- Film poster
- Directed by: Andrew Lau
- Written by: Manfred Wong; Sharon Hui
- Produced by: Andrew Lau; Manfred Wong
- Starring: Ekin Cheng; Jordan Chan; Gigi Lai; Jason Chu; Jerry Lamb; Michael Tse; Halina Tam; Chingmy Yau; Anthony Wong; Simon Yam
- Cinematography: Andrew Lau
- Edited by: Marco Mak
- Music by: Clarence Hui; Ronald Ng
- Distributed by: Golden Harvest Company; BoB and Partners Co. Ltd. Warner Bros. Pictures
- Release date: 30 March 1996
- Running time: 101 minutes
- Country: Hong Kong
- Languages: Cantonese; Mandarin; Hokkien

Young and Dangerous 2 (Chinese: 古惑仔2之猛龍過江) is a 1996 Hong Kong triad film directed by Andrew Lau. It is the first sequel in the Young and Dangerous film series.

== Plot ==
In a flashback to Young and Dangerous, "Chicken" Chiu (Jordan Chan) heads into exile and decides to go to Taiwan, after a failed hit. The first part of the movie details the events leading up to his return to Hong Kong, following the death of his boss "Uncle Bee" (Frankie Ng). In Taiwan, Chicken's cousin introduces him to the "San Luen" Triad, headed by an influential Taiwanese senator. Although the atmosphere in the city is quite different than Hong Kong, Chicken gains the senator's favor by assassinating his rival. Pleased with the youth's initiative, he promotes Chicken to branch leader and does not even mind Chicken being smitten with his beautiful mistress (Chingmy Yau). Upon hearing news of Bee's death, Chicken returns to Hong Kong and helps best friends Chan Ho Nam (Ekin Cheng), Dai Tin-yee (Michael Tse) and K.K. (Halina Tam) to get rid of corrupt "Hung Hing" Chairman "Ugly Kwan" (Francis Ng).

The second part of the movie deals with returning Hung Hing Chairman Chiang Tin Sang (Simon Yam) trying to ally with San Luen and promote relationships, while trying to find a replacement branch leader of Causeway Bay, a position Bee held. Ho Nam is the most likely candidate, being Bee's must trusted underling, but a rivalry breaks out when another member "Tai Fei" (Anthony Wong) wants the position for himself. At the same time, Ho Nam's friend Pou Pan (Jerry Lam) recruits "Banana Skin" (Jason Chu), who bewilders Ho Nam and the rest of his friends because of his facial similarity to Pou Pan's deceased brother Chow Pan. During a visit back to Taiwan to see and thank the senator personally for helping them get rid of Kwan, Ho Nam and Chicken find him dead and are accused by San Luen of killing him.

In actuality, the culprit is the senator's mistress, who uses this opportunity to lead San Luen and break Hung Hing's grip on their gambling spots in Macau, reinforcing San Luen influence in the area. To that end, Tai Fei willingly allies with her and plots to have Ho Nam's candidacy for the Causeway Bay branch leadership tainted. Ho Nam is barely swayed by Tai Fei's threats, until a car accident cripples his girlfriend Smartie (Gigi Lai), putting her in a coma. Although disheartened by her condition, Ho Nam does not back out of the candidacy, and plans to stage an intervention at a San Luen opening of a new Macau casino, during which an important member of the Macau government will attend. Ho Nam's sabotage of the event is successful, destroying any credibility San Luen has in Macau and to Tai Fei's nomination.

In a tense Mexican standoff at the town square, the senator's mistress and Tai Fei decides to settle things with Ho Nam and Chicken, summoning hundreds of San Luen and Hung Hing members. While it appears that victory is in the mistress' hands, Tai Fei turns on her: it was all a ploy on Hung Hing's part for him to ally with San Luen and provide a means to weed out any corrupt members in the Taiwanese secret society. Realizing it was she who killed the senator, San Luen's branch leaders decide to take her back to Taiwan for punishment, but Chicken requests he speak with her before she is led away. Upon stating she is the only woman he has ever truly loved, he executes her on the spot, knowing full well she will die more painfully in Taiwan. With the matter settled, Tai Fei abstains from the Causeway Bay branch leadership candidacy and Ho Nam is elected its leader.

== Cast ==
- Ekin Cheng - Chan Ho Nam
- Jordan Chan - Chiu
- Gigi Lai - Smartie
- Jason Chu - Banana Skin
- Jerry Lamb - Pou Pan
- Michael Tse - Dai Tin-yee
- Halina Tam - K.K.
- Chingmy Yau - Ding-yiu
- Anthony Wong Chau-sang - Tai Fei
- Simon Yam - Chiang Tin Sang
- Blackie Ko
- Moses Chan

== See also ==
- Young and Dangerous (series)
