= Gigi Lai =

- 黎珈而
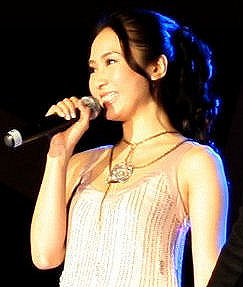
- Lai in 2007
- Born: 1 October 1971 (age 54); British Hong Kong
- Occupations: Actress; singer
- Years active: 1985–2008
- Spouse: Patrick Ma Ting-kung (m. 2008)
- Children: 3
- Awards: TVB Anniversary Awards – Best Actress; 2004 War and Beauty; My Favourite Television Character; 2004 War and Beauty; Mainland Most Popular TVB Female Artist (2007)

Chinese name
- Chinese: 黎珈而
Transcriptions
Standard Mandarin
- Hanyu Pinyin: Lí Jiā ér

Former name
- Chinese: 黎姿
Transcriptions
Standard Mandarin
- Hanyu Pinyin: Lí Zī
Yue: Cantonese
- Jyutping: Lai4 Zi1
- Musical career
- Also known as: Goddess of Beauty (愛美神)
- Genres: Cantopop

Gigi Lai Chi (born 1 October 1971) is a Hong Kong actress and singer. Entering the entertainment industry in 1985, Lai was under a contract with the television station TVB from 1991 until she retired in 2008. Nicknamed by the Hong Kong media as the "Goddess of Beauty" (愛美神), she is best known for her roles in The Heaven Sword and Dragon Saber (2000), War and Beauty (2004), for which she won the TVB Anniversary Award for Best Actress, The Charm Beneath (2005), The Dance of Passion (2006), and The Gem of Life (2009).

== Early life ==
On 1 October 1971 Lai was born in Hong Kong. Lai's grandfather Lai Man-Wai was a key figure of the first generation of Hong Kong filmmakers, and her grandmother Lim Cho Cho was a silent era star. Her aunts are Lai Cheuk-cheuk, who was famous in Hong Kong films, and Lai Suen, who acted in many Hong Kong TVB dramas. Lai's uncle in law, Shen Chang-huan, is Taiwan's longest-serving Minister of Foreign Affairs. Lai's father was deaf since young due to meningitis.

== Career ==
When Lai's family went bankrupt, she entered the entertainment industry at the age of 14 to earn money to support her family and her younger brother's education in England. Lai began her career as a singer, releasing several albums in the 1990s in both Cantonese and Mandarin.

In her early acting career, Lai turned down roles that she felt compromised her public persona. However, she overcame her "superficial and childish image" later and began to embrace many critically acclaimed roles. She won the TVB Anniversary Award for Best Actress for her role in War and Beauty. Lai also performed in several box office hits, including the Young and Dangerous film series. At the premiere of The Gem of Life, Lai announced that she would be retiring from the industry to concentrate on looking after her brother's business after he was seriously injured in a car accident in 2007.

== Personal life and marriage ==
In 2008, Lai married businessman Patrick Ma Ting-kung to rumours that they were expecting their first child, however Lai later dismissed the rumours of her pregnancy.

In March 2010, Lai confirmed that she was pregnant with twins, and on July 25, 2010, she gave birth to two girls. On October 8, 2012, she gave birth to her third daughter.

== Filmography ==
=== Films ===
Year	Title	Role	Notes
1985	Happy Ghost II	Student	
1986	The Family Strikes Back	Shek Lai-chi	
1986	United We Stand	Polly Ho	
1990	Dragon in Jail	Winnie Sung	
1991	The Queen of Gamble	Linda	
1991	Spiritual Trinity	Hsiu Shuan	
1991	Queen of Underworld	Butterfly Lam	
1993	Secret Signs	Jackie	
1993	Kung Fu Cult Master	Chow Chi-Yu	
1994	To Live and Die in Tsimshatsui	Moon	
1996	Young and Dangerous	Smartie/Stammer	
1996	Young and Dangerous 2	Smartie/Stammer	
1996	Young and Dangerous 3	Smartie/Stammer	
1996	Street of Fury	Yi	
1996	Till Death Do We Laugh	Mill	
1997	All's Well, Ends Well 1997	Gigi	
1997	24 Hours Ghost Story	Siu Wan	
1997	Cause We Are So Young	Mimi	
1997	Destination: 9th Heaven	Mona Chin	
1997	Theft Under the Sun	Fai-fai	
1998	Ninth Happiness	Ms. Hung	
1998	Super Energetic Man	Princess Lychee	
1998	The Three Lustketeers	Angela	
1998	Haunted Mansion	Gigi	
1999	The Accident	Cindy	
1999	Troublesome Night 6	Kwok Siu Heung	
1999	A Wicked Ghost	Cessy	
2000	Fist Power	Hung	
2000	One Drop of Blood Per Step		a.k.a. One Drop of Blood Perstep
2000	Black Blood		
2000	Raped by an Angel 5: The Final Judgement	Nancy	
2000	To Where He Belongs	Yuet	
2000	Queenie and King the Lovers	Eliza	
2000	The Legend of the Flying Swordsman	Cher	
2000	Man Wanted 3	Ho Siu Chi / Gi Ho	
2000	Young and Dangerous 6: Born to Be King	Rong Yu	
2000	Okinawa Rendez-vous	Sandy	
2000	For Bad Boys Only	Tiny	
2001	Body Puzzle		
2002	Devil Face, Angel Heart	Wendy	
2002	A Wicked Ghost III: The Possession	Catherine / Ding Dong Taoist	a.k.a. The Wicked Ghost III: The Possession
2002	The Master Swordsman Returns		
2003	The Dark Side of My Mind	Coco	
2003	News Heart	Gigi	a.k.a. New's Heart
2003	1:99 Shorts		a.k.a. 1:99 Short Film Series
2009	Team of Miracle: We Will Rock You	Amanda Liu	

=== Television ===
Year	Title	Role	Network	Notes
1991	Drifters	Ching Ga Bo	TVB Jade	
1992	The Change of Time	Cheuk Nga Yun	TVB Jade	
1992	Eastern Hero	Tung Ji Gwan	TVB Jade	
1992	The Stake	Lok Ga Kei	TVB Jade	
1992	Wong Fei Hung Returns	Miu Jyu	TVB Jade	
1993	The Link	Tong Ho Kei	TVB Jade	
1993	The Heroes From Shaolin	Dun Muk Giu	TVB Jade	a.k.a. Heroes From Shaolin
1994	Heartstrings	Gam Suet Mui	TVB Jade	
1996	The Criminal Investigator II	Tammy	TVB Jade	
2000	The Heavenly Sword and Dragon Sabre	Chiu Man	TVB Jade	
2001	Master Swordsman Lu Xiaofeng 2	Han Ling	TCS / TVB Jade	
2001	The New Adventures of Chor Lau Heung	Su Rongrong	CTS / TVB Jade	
2002	Doomed to Oblivion	Wong Yut Che	TVB Drama / TVB Jade	Warehoused and broadcast in 2007
2003	Fate Twisters	Lum Oi Mei / Lum Ah Nui	TVB Jade	
2003	Riches and Stitches	Miu Hoi Tong	TVBS	
2003	Twilight Tubes Part II		TVB	
2004	War and Beauty	Hou-Jia Yu-Ying	TVB Jade	TVB Award for Best Actress; TVB Award for My Favourite Television Character
2004	Shades of Truth	Man Fung Lin / Poon Gum Lin (Nicole)	TVB Jade	
2005	Healing Hands III	Frances	TVB Jade	
2005	The Charm Beneath	Chuk Ming-Wai	TVB Jade	Nominated – TVB Award for Best Actress
2006	The Dance of Passion	Kai Ming-Fung	TVB Jade	Nominated – TVB Award for Best Actress; Nominated – TVB Award for My Favourite Female Character
2007	Life Art	Yam Tsi-Wah	TVB Jade	
2007	The Ultimate Crime Fighter	Wong Ching-Ying	TVB Jade	Nominated – TVB Award for Best Actress; Nominated – TVB Award for My Favourite Female Character
2008-2009	The Gem of Life	Hong Nga-Tung (Constance)	TVB Jade	Nominated – TVB Award for Best Actress

== Awards ==
- 1993 Best Selling Single
- 1994 Top 10 Chinese Songs (Silver Medal)
- 1994 JSG Best New Talent Singer
- 2004 TVB 37th Anniversary – Best Actress Award, as Yuk Ying in War and Beauty
- 2004 TVB 37th Anniversary – Best Character Award, as Yuk Ying in War and Beauty
- 2004 Black and White Television Characters Awards, Favourite Actress Award
- 2004 Metro's Best Duet Collaboration Award for the Song “Poison” with Bowie Lam
- 2004 Metroshowbiz TV awards – Top 10 TV Actors and Actresses
- 2004 Watson's Annual Health & Beauty Awards – Artiste with Perfect Skin
- 2005 TVB Weekly Popularity Awards – Most Popular Magazine Cover Artiste
- 2005 TVB Weekly Popularity Awards – Most Popular Female Artiste
- 2005 TVB Weekly Popularity Awards – Most Popular Female in Ancient Drama
- 2005 TVB Weekly Popularity Awards – Most Popular of them all
- 2005 Next Magazine TV Awards Top 10 TV Artists
- 2005 Next Magazine Sponsorship Award - Best Style Actress
- 2005 Top Ten Best Dressed Personalities Awards
- 2005 Watson's Annual Health & Beauty Awards – Artiste with Perfect Skin
- 2005 Astro TV Drama Award – Favourite Female Character Award for War and Beauty
- 2005 Astro TV Drama Award – Favourite Lethal Beauty Award for War and Beauty
- 2005 Metroshowbiz TV awards – Top 10 TV Actors and Actresses
- 2006 TVB Weekly Popularity Awards – Top 10 TV Artists
- 2006 Watson's Annual Health & Beauty Awards – Artiste with Perfect Skin
- 2006 China Entertainment Awards – Most Popular Non-Mainland Actress
- 2007 Astro TV Drama Award – Favorite Moment Award for Frances in Healing Hands 3
- 2007 Health Choice Award
- 2007 China/HK 10th Entertainment Awards - Most Popular Actress Award
- 2007 China/HK 10th Entertainment Awards - Best Couple Award with Bowie Lam
- 2007 Watson's HWB Awards - Top Diamond Award
- 2007 Singapore I-weekly Magazine - Top 10 Most Loved Hong Kong Actresses
- 2007 TVB 40th Anniversary - Mainland Audience's Fave TVB Actress Award
- 2008 Astro TV Drama Award – Favourite Actress Award for Dance of Passion
- 2008 Astro TV Drama Award – Favourite Character Award for Dance of Passion
- 2008 Hong Kong-Asia Film Financing Forum - Top Six Most Popular Hong Kong TV Female Artistes
- 2008 HKFDA 20th Annual Best Dressed Personalities Awards
- 2009 New York Festivals Television and Film Award - Hong Kong, TVB: Best Performance for The Ultimate Crime Fighter

Awards and achievements
TVB Anniversary Awards
Preceded by Maggie Cheung Ho Yee for The King of Yesterday and Tomorrow	Best Actress; 2004 for War and Beauty	Succeeded by Liza Wang for Wars of In-laws
