= Manfred Wong =

Hong Kong radio personality, producer, screenwriter, director and actor

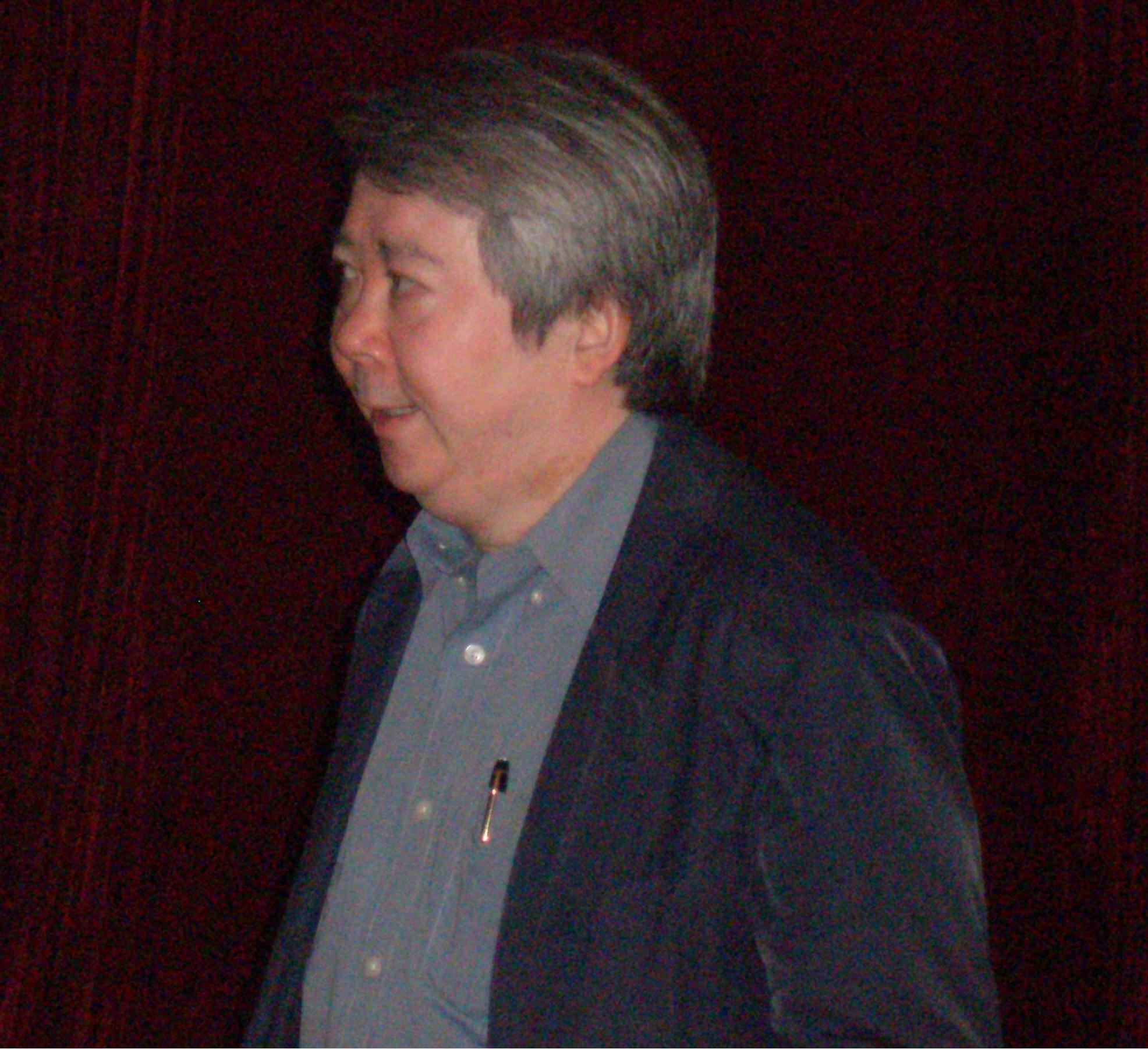
- Wong in October 2009
- Born: 1957 (age 68–69); Hong Kong
- Education: St. Paul's Convent School; Hong Kong Baptist College
- Occupations: Filmmaker; critic; radio host; actor

Chinese name
Transcriptions
Standard Mandarin
- Hanyu Pinyin: Wén Jùn
Yue: Cantonese
- Jyutping: Man4 Zeon3

Manfred Wong (Chinese: 王文雋; Wong Man-Chun; born 5 June 1957, in Hong Kong) is a Hong Kong filmmaker, critic, radio personality, and actor. He is best known for his involvement as a writer for the Young and Dangerous film series. He is also a founding member of the Hong Kong Film Critics Society and he currently posts his reviews on his YouTube channel Man's Talk.

== Biography ==
Born in 1957 in Hong Kong, Wong had studied at St. Paul's Convent School. Thereafter, he majored in communications at Baptist College, but dropped out before completion and took up the post as a TV copywriter. In 1972, he worked as a writer for magazines and newspapers. In 1977, he became a scriptwriter at RTV and was involved in several drama series such as Reincarnated and Dragon Strike. He entered the film industry in 1979, working in the creative side of production.

In 1995 he formed a partnership with director-cinematographer Andrew Lau and writer-producer-director Wong Jing to establish BoB and Partners Co. Ltd., the creative team most noted for its creation of the very successful Young and Dangerous which established box-office-record-breaking success. The 'BoB' stands for "Best of the Best."

== Filmography ==
Writer

- The Last Tycoon (2012)
- Loving Him (2002)
- Women From Mars (2002)
- For Bad Boys Only (2000)
- Born to Be King (2000)
- Tau mung (2000)
- Those Were the Days... (2000)
- A Man Called Hero (1999)
- Sex and Zen III (1998)
- The Storm Riders (1998)
- Young and Dangerous: The Prequel (1998)
- Portland Street Blues (1998)
- Young and Dangerous 5 (1998)
- Young and Dangerous 4 (1997)
- Young and Dangerous (1996)
- Young and Dangerous 2 (1996)
- Young and Dangerous 3 (1996)
- Street Angels (1996)
- The Trail (1993)
- Deadly Dream Woman (1992)
- The Perfect Match (1991)
- Yu pui tsuen II (1987)
- Rich and Famous (1987)
- Soul (1986)
- Dream Lovers (1986)
- Carry on Doctors and Nurses (1985)
- Twinkle Twinkle Little Star (1983)
- Everlasting Love (1983)
- Lonely Fifteen (1982)
- Duel to the Death (1982)
- Encore (1980)
