= Jerry Lamb =

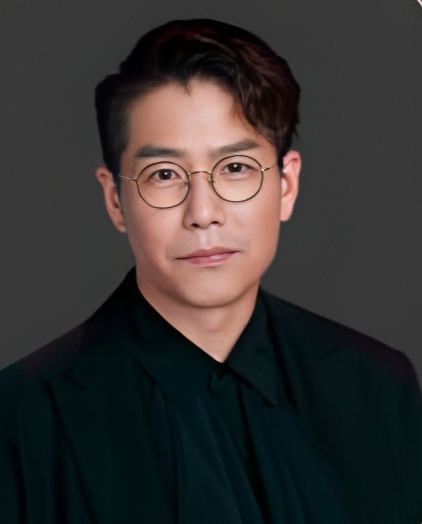
- Lamb in 2023
- Born: 28 September 1970 (age 55); British Hong Kong
- Occupations: Actor; singer; TV presenter; DJ
- Spouse: Lily Hong (m. 2002; div. 2020)
- Children: 2
- Awards: TVB Anniversary Awards – My Favourite On-Screen Partners (Non-Dramas); 1998 The Super Trio Show; 1999 The Super Trio Mega Show; 2001 Super Trio Show Sr.2; 2004 The Super Trio Continues

Chinese name
- Traditional Chinese: 林曉峰
- Simplified Chinese: 林晓峰
Transcriptions
Standard Mandarin
- Hanyu Pinyin: Lín Xiáofèng
Yue: Cantonese
- Jyutping: Lam^{4} Hiu^{2} Fung^{1}
- Musical career
- Also known as: Ah Lo

Gerald Lamb Hiu-Fung (Chinese: 林曉峰) (born 28 September 1970) is a Hong Kong actor, singer, television presenter, and DJ.

== Career ==
In 1993, Lamb joined Wharf Cable Television. In 1994, he appeared in the film He's a Woman, She's a Man and was appreciated by Eric Tsang; shortly after that, he joined Eric Tsang as a cohost of the Super Trio Series, a variety show on Television Broadcasts Limited (TVB).

In 1995, he portrayed the young lackey Pou-pan in the film Young and Dangerous, becoming one of his best-known roles. As an actor, his best performance was seen in the 1996 film The Log with Michael Wong and Kent Cheng. A nomination for Best Supporting Actor was presented to Lamb for The Log.

In 2007, he joined Asia Television Limited as a program host. In 2012, he returned to TVB as a host and hosted several shows. In 2018, he hosted several talk shows for ViuTV.

In 2021, in mainland China, he participated in the mainland program Call Me by Fire, and became one of the "Brothers in the Greater Bay Area".

In 2022, he guest hosted the Chinese New Year Gala of the Guangdong Radio and Television Station for the first time and appeared as a singer in the music program Infinity and Beyond (声生不息).

== Personal life ==
Lamb is the younger brother of DJ, pop singer, and actor Jan Lamb and radio personality-turned-singer Sandy Lamb (林姍姍). He is the nephew of actor Ti Lung and his cousin is actor Shaun Tam Chun Yin.

In 2002, Lamb married Lily Hong, and they have two sons. In September 2020, Hong publicly admitted she divorced him.

== Filmography ==
=== Television ===
Year	Drama
1997	Old Time Buddy
1997	A Recipe for the Heart
1998	Secret of the Heart
1998	Old Time Buddy: To Catch a Thief
1999	Man's Best Friend
1999	Face to Face
1999	A Smiling Ghost Story
2000	Street Fighters
2003	Triumph in the Skies
2003	Hearts of Fencing
2004	Sunshine Heartbeat
2004	Kung Fu Soccer
2013	Return of the Silver Tongue

=== Film ===
Year	Film
1994	Touches of Love
1994	He's a Woman, She's a Man
1995	Doctor Mack
1995	Happy Hour
1995	Heaven Can't Wait
1995	Only Fools Fall in Love
1996	Combo Cops
1996	Young and Dangerous
1996	Young and Dangerous 2
1996	Young and Dangerous 3
1996	Top Banana Club
1996	The Log
1996	Street of Fury
1996	Growing Up
1996	Best of the Best
1996	The Youngers
1997	Young and Dangerous 4
1997	Midnight Zone
1997	L-O-V-E ..... Love
1997	Hooked on You
1997	The Hunted Hunter / Chasing Murderer
1998	Young and Dangerous 5
1998	Portland Street Blues
1998	Faces of Horrid
1998	You Light Up My Life
1998	Anna Magdalena
1999	Beach Girl
1999	The Boss Up There
1999	A Man Called Hero
1999	The Legend of Speed
2000	The Duel
2000	Those Were the Days
2000	Born to Be King
2000	Clean My Name, Mr. Coroner!
2000	For Bad Boys Only
2001	Cop Shop Babes
2001	Comic King
2001	Doctor No
2001	Scaremonger
2002	Dong laam yan bin shing lui yan, Women from Mars
2002	No Problems 2
2003	City of SARS
2004	Love Is a Many Stupid Thing
2005	Kung Fu Mahjong
2006	Feel It... Say It...
2012	I Love Hong Kong 2012
2015	Jian Bing Man
2015	Lost in Hong Kong
2016	Kidnap Ding Ding Don
2016	Special Female Force
2018	Golden Job
2018	Legends of the Three Kingdoms
2019	A Journey of Happiness
2019	Bodies at Rest
2020	Hell Bank Presents: Running Ghost
2020	Enter the Fat Dragon
2021	Man on the Edge
2022	Tales from the Occult
2025	The Dumpling Queen

== Preside over ==
=== TV host ===
Year	Show	TV Station
1995	Movie Buff Championship	Television Broadcasts Limited (TVB)
1996	K-100	Television Broadcasts Limited (TVB)
1997	Movie Buff Championship (Sr. 2)	Television Broadcasts Limited (TVB)
1997	K-100	Television Broadcasts Limited (TVB)
1998	The Super Trio Show	Television Broadcasts Limited (TVB)
1999	The Super Trio Mega Show	Television Broadcasts Limited (TVB)
2000	Super Trio Show (Sr. 2)	Television Broadcasts Limited (TVB)
2000	Jade Solid Gold	Television Broadcasts Limited (TVB)
2001	Jade Solid Gold	Television Broadcasts Limited (TVB)
2002	A Trio Delights	Television Broadcasts Limited (TVB)
2002	Jade Solid Gold	Television Broadcasts Limited (TVB)
2004	The Super Trio Continues	Television Broadcasts Limited (TVB)
2004	TVB Children Day 2004	Television Broadcasts Limited (TVB)
2005	Scoop	Television Broadcasts Limited (TVB)
2005	TVB Children Day 2005	Television Broadcasts Limited (TVB)
2006	15/16	Television Broadcasts Limited (TVB)
2008	2008 Summer Olympics closing ceremony	Asia Television Limited
2008	Miss Asia	Asia Television Limited
2008	Jetso@Tv	Asia Television Limited
2009	Asian Million Star (Season 1)	Asia Television Limited
2010	Asian Million Star (Season 2)	Asia Television Limited
2010	Asian Million Star (Season 3)	Asia Television Limited
2010	Twinkle Stars Guest host	Asia Television Limited
2011	Food Court	Wharf Cable Television
2012	TV Funny	Television Broadcasts Limited (TVB)
2013	Super Trio Maximus	Television Broadcasts Limited (TVB)
2014	Summer Splash	Television Broadcasts Limited (TVB)
2015	Sunday Songbird	Television Broadcasts Limited (TVB)
2016	We Are Not Family Man	Television Broadcasts Limited (TVB)
2016	I Heart HK	Television Broadcasts Limited (TVB)
2017	Amazing Summer Splash	Television Broadcasts Limited (TVB)
2018	New Year Is A Game	Television Broadcasts Limited (TVB)
2018	Voice Out！街口有乐!	YouTube Channel
2018	Good Night Show Football Fans Party	ViuTV
2018	Good Night Show - The Wreak Station	ViuTV
2018	Outside In	ViuTV
2018	Hong Kong New Year Countdown Celebrations	ViuTV
2019	Nothing Can Break Us Apart	ViuTV
2019	Mastermind	ViuTV
2021	Gender Survey	ViuTV
2021	Tell Me Wine	ViuTV
2022	Infinity and Beyond/Endless Melody (EP 5 Guest Host)	Hunan Broadcasting System
2023	Super Trio Returns	Television Broadcasts Limited (TVB)
