= BoB and Partners Co. Ltd. =

BoB and Partners Co. Ltd
- Type: Production company
- Industry: Film production
- Founded: 1996; 30 years ago
- Defunct: 2003; 23 years ago
- Headquarters: Hong Kong
- Key people: Andrew Lau; Wong Jing; Manfred Wong
- Products: Films

BoB and Partners Co. Ltd. (simplified Chinese: 最佳拍档有限公司; traditional Chinese: 最佳拍檔有限公司) was a Hong Kong production company. It was established by famed filmmakers Wong Jing, Manfred Wong and Andrew Lau during the success of the Young and Dangerous series. The "BoB" of the title stands for 'Best of the Best.'

== Company ==
Currently affiliated with Fortune Star, the company is best known for their opening credit flourish set to the "Best Partners" tune of Aces Go Places fame.

The first film from BoB was Young and Dangerous 2. It went on to produce the rest of the Young and Dangerous films, as well as its spin-offs, including other films such as The Storm Riders, and God of Gamblers 3: The Early Stage.
