= Andrew Lau =

Hong Kong filmmaker (born 1960)

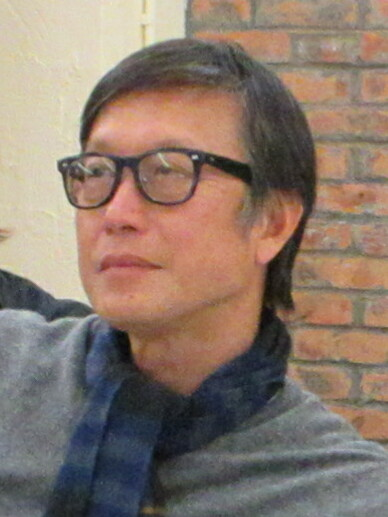
- Lau in 2017
- Born: 4 April 1960 (age 66); British Hong Kong
- Occupations: Film director; film producer; cinematographer
- Awards: Hong Kong Film Awards – Best Director; 2002 Infernal Affairs; Golden Bauhinia Awards – Best Director; 2002 Infernal Affairs; Golden Horse Awards – Best Director; 2002 Infernal Affairs

Chinese name
- Traditional Chinese: 劉偉強
- Simplified Chinese: 刘伟强
Transcriptions
Standard Mandarin
- Hanyu Pinyin: Liú Wěiqiáng

Andrew Lau Wai-keung (Chinese: 劉偉強, born 4 April 1960) is a Hong Kong filmmaker. Lau began his career in the 1980s and 1990s, serving as a cinematographer to filmmakers such as Ringo Lam, Wong Jing and Wong Kar-wai. In the 1990s, Lau decided to have more creative freedom as a cinematographer by becoming a film director and producer. Apart from making films in his native Hong Kong, Lau has also made films in mainland China, South Korea and the United States.

Lau has made films in a variety of genres and is known for his action and crime films, which include the Young and Dangerous film series and the Infernal Affairs trilogy (co-directed with Alan Mak).

== Early life ==
Andrew Lau was born 4 April 1960, and is one of six siblings. As a child, he was raised in the New Territories of Hong Kong. His father worked as a construction worker on Hong Kong Island. Since his parents did not have time to concentrate on all of their children, Lau had developed an interest in photography. Lau was also a Catholic, and would go to church every week, learning how to play a guitar. As a child and high school student, Lau admits to not liking Hong Kong, since it was a British colony.

He currently has four children, three sons and a daughter.

== Career ==
Lau joined Shaw Brothers Studios after graduating from secondary school. He made his film debut as a semi-skilled cinematographer for Lau Kar-leung's 1982 film Legendary Weapons of China. He later served as a cinematographer for Sammo Hung's 1986 martial arts film Millionaire's Express and Ringo Lam's 1987 crime thriller City on Fire, where he became known for his use of lighting and hand-held cinematography. His work on As Tears Go By (1988), the directorial debut of Wong Kar-wai, earned him his first Hong Kong Film Award nomination for Best Cinematography. He also shot the beginning portion of Wong Kar-wai's Chungking Express in 1994 (Christopher Doyle was cinematographer for the film's second half).

=== Filmmaking ===
Lau become a film director and producer on top of still being a cinematographer. He made his directorial debut with the 1990 action film Against All. Lau went on to make films for prolific filmmaker Wong Jing, including the 1993 Category III film Raped by an Angel and the 1994 film To Live and Die in Tsimshatsui. In 1996, Lau directed and photographed the 1996 film Young and Dangerous, a film centered on Hong Kong's Triad society. The film was a huge success in Hong Kong, but also gained controversy for its glorification of Triads. The film spawned a several sequels and spin-offs, in which Lau directed seven sequels and one prequel. While filming the franchise, Lau teamed up with screenwriter Manfred Wong and film producer Wong Jing to establish BoB and Partners Co. Ltd., a company responsible for films made by the trio of filmmakers. The trio's collaborations proved to be successful with films such as The Storm Riders, The Legend of Speed, and The Duel.

In 2002, Lau established Basic Pictures, a company responsible for the films in which he served as a producer and director. That year saw the success of Infernal Affairs a crime thriller that the largest ensemble cast of any Hong Kong film that year. Infernal Affairs became a huge box-office success in Hong Kong, even being deemed as a "box-office miracle" at a time when Hong Kong cinema was said to have been lacking in creativity. Infernal Affairs also marked the first of several collaborations with co-director Alan Mak, and screenwriter Felix Chong. Other films made by the directors and screenwriter include the sequels to Infernal Affairs (Infernal Affairs II and Infernal Affairs III), Initial D and Confession of Pain.

In 2014, Lau directed an American action crime drama film Revenge of the Green Dragons, which was co-directed by Andrew Loo and executive produced by Martin Scorsese. The film has been screened at a number of international film festivals, and had also received a day-and-date theatrical and VOD release in the United States. In December 2014, Lau said that the film was able to make profit.

=== Other works ===
In 2007, Lau directed a five-minute short film for Vision Beijing, a project of the Beijing Foreign Cultural Exchanges Association and the Information Office of the Beijing Municipal Government. Lau's short film was centered on Beijing cuisine, and consisted of actors from mainland China, Hong Kong and Taiwan serving as "ambassadors". The cast included Tony Leung Chiu-Wai, Shu Qi, and Jay Chou, actors who had appeared in several of Lau's films.

In 2009, Lau directed an eight-minute commercial promoting the Acura TL luxury car. The commercial is divided into three stories and features Andy Lau as a wine manor and Gwei Lun-mei as an artist. Filming took place in San Francisco, California with an American production team.

== Filmography ==
=== Director ===
Directed features
Year	Title	Distribution
1990	Against All	Golden Princess Amusement
1991	The Ultimate Vampire	Newport Entertainment
1992	Rhythm of Destiny	Golden Princess Amusement
1993	Raped by an Angel	Newport Entertainment
1993	Ghost Lantern	Newport Entertainment
1994	Modern Romance	Wong Jing's Workshop Ltd.
1994	To Live and Die in Tsimshatsui	Wong Jing's Workshop Ltd.
1995	Lover of the Last Empress	China Star Entertainment Group
1995	Mean Street Story	Newport Entertainment
1996	Young and Dangerous	Golden Harvest Company
1996	Young and Dangerous 2	Golden Harvest Company
1996	Young & Dangerous III	Golden Harvest Company
1996	Best of the Best	Golden Harvest Company
1997	Young and Dangerous 4	Golden Harvest Company
1998	Young and Dangerous V	Golden Harvest Company
1998	Young & Dangerous: The Prequel	Golden Harvest Company
1998	The Storm Riders	Golden Harvest Company
1999	A Man Called Hero	Golden Harvest Company
1999	The Legend of Speed	China Star Entertainment Group
2000	The Duel	China Star Entertainment Group
2000	Sausalito	BoB and Partners Co. Ltd.
2000	Born to Be King	Golden Harvest Company
2001	Bullets of Love	Deltamac Films
2001	The Avenging Fist	BoB and Partners Co. Ltd.
2001	Dance of a Dream	Media Asia Entertainment Group
2002	The Wesley's Mysterious File	China Star Entertainment Group
2002	Women from Mars	Universe Films Distribution Co. Ltd.
2002	Infernal Affairs	Media Asia Entertainment Group
2003	Infernal Affairs II	Media Asia Entertainment Group
2003	The Park	Universe Laser & Video Co., Ltd
2003	Infernal Affairs III	Media Asia Entertainment Group
2005	Initial D	Media Asia Entertainment Group
2006	Daisy	Showbox
2006	Confession of Pain	Media Asia Entertainment Group
2007	The Flock	The Weinstein Company
2009	Look for a Star	Media Asia Entertainment Group
2010	Legend of the Fist: The Return of Chen Zhen	Media Asia Entertainment Group
2011	A Beautiful Life	Media Asia Entertainment Group
2012	The Guillotines	Media Asia Entertainment Group
2014	Revenge of the Green Dragons	Golden Scene
2016	From Vegas to Macau III	Golden Harvest Company
2017	The Founding of an Army	China Film Group Corporation
2018	Kung Fu Monster	Media Asia Entertainment Group
2019	The Captain	Bona Film Group
2021	Chinese Doctors	Huaxia Film Distribution
2025	The Dumpling Queen	China Media Capital

Television

- Fox Volant of the Snowy Mountain (2006)

=== Actor ===
- Little Cop (1989)
- Curry and Pepper (1990)
- Inspiration Nightmare (1992)
- Twin Dragons (1992)
- Growing Up (1996)
- Young and Dangerous 4 (1997)
- As the Light Goes Out (2014)
- Kung Fu Jungle (2014)
