= Jordan Chan =

Hong Kong actor and singer

Jordan Chan 陳小春
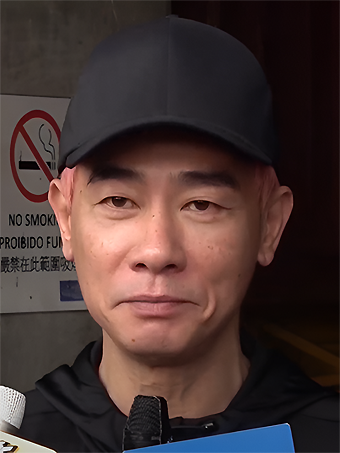
- Chan in 2019
- Born: Chan Siu-tsun (陳小臻); 8 July 1967 (age 59); Huizhou, Guangdong, China
- Other names: Chan Siu-chun, Chan Tai-chuen (陳泰銓)
- Occupations: Actor; singer; dancer
- Years active: 1985–present
- Spouse: Cherrie Ying (m. 2010)
- Children: 2
- Awards: Hong Kong Film Awards – Best Supporting Actor; 1995 Twenty Something
- Musical career
- Origin: Hong Kong, China
- Genres: Mandopop, Cantopop, hip hop

Chinese name
- Traditional Chinese: 陳小春
- Simplified Chinese: 陈小春
- Hanyu Pinyin: Chén Xiǎochūn
- Jyutping: Can^{4} Siu^{2}-ceon^{1}

Birth name
- Traditional Chinese: 陳小臻
- Simplified Chinese: 陈小臻
- Hanyu Pinyin: Chén Xiǎozhēn
- Jyutping: Can^{4} Siu^{2}-zeon^{1}

Signature
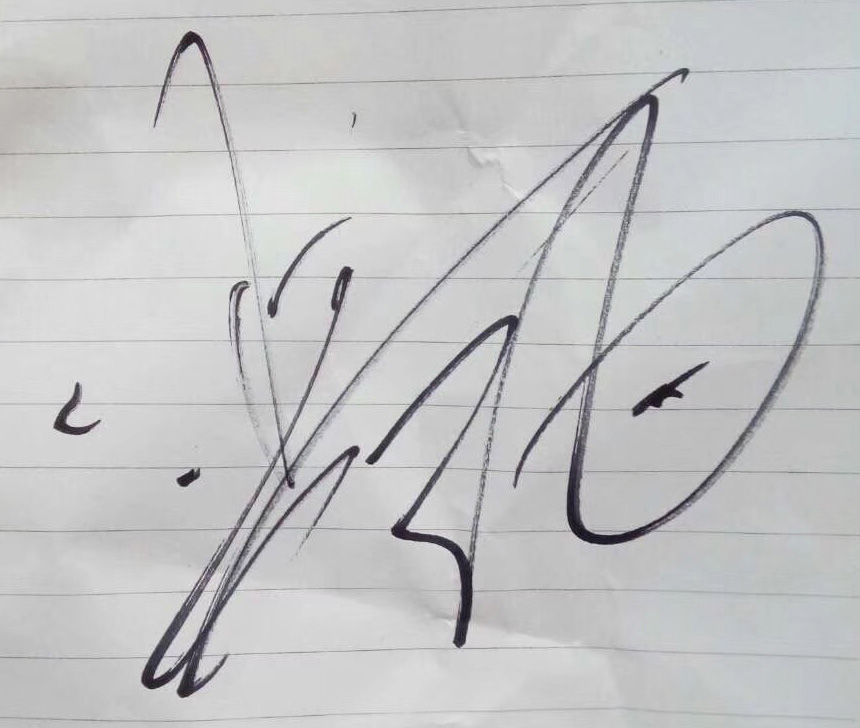

Jordan Chan Siu-chun (Chinese: 陳小春, born 8 July 1967) is a Hong Kong actor, singer and dancer, known for starring in the Young and Dangerous film series and for his role in the 1998 TV adaptation of Louis Cha's novel, The Duke of Mount Deer. In recent years, he received renewed attention for his appearances in the Chinese reality shows Where Are We Going, Dad? in 2017 and Call Me By Fire (2021 and 2022).

== Early life ==
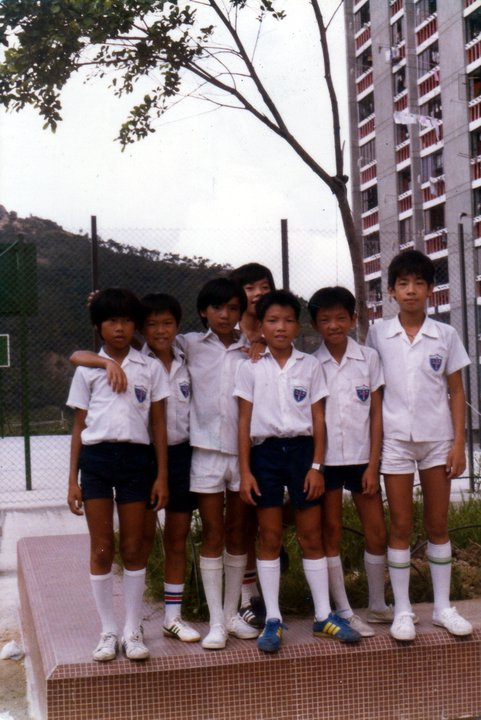
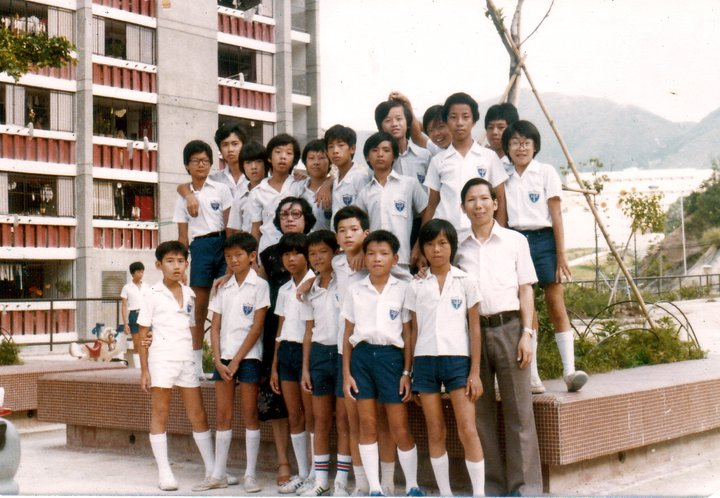
Photos of the 15th elementary school graduates (Class 6B) in 1981. The one on the right in the left picture and the six on the left in the top row on the right is Chan.

Chan was born to a Hakka family in a rural village in Huizhou, Guangdong province, southern China. In 2018, Chan revealed in an interview that when he was young, his family was so poor that they didn't have enough to eat, and he once suggested to give his younger brother away to a rich family and for the suggestion, he received a beating from his parents. However his parents eventually did give away his young brother for HKD3,000. Chan also revealed that his father used to chain him up at home, afraid that he would run out of the house to play instead of taking care of his younger siblings. Chan also had to work the field, cut grass, and tend to cows. He left school in his teens when his family moved to Hong Kong. He and his family lived in cramped quarters within a slum, and Chan worked odd jobs at construction sites, as a cook at a dim sum restaurant, served at roadside hawker stalls, and apprenticed at a hair salon.

Chan was charged and convicted of the molestation of an underaged girl when he was 14.

== Career ==
Chan got his start by enrolling in the TVB Dancers' Training Class in 1985. Soon after graduation, he joined a few of the studio's troupes that would accompany popular singers during their live performances. He worked with artists such as Alan Tam, Leslie Cheung, and Anita Mui before being invited by a producer to make a record of his own.

In 1994, he made his film debut with Twenty Something. Chan has since received several Hong Kong Film Award nominations: two for his role in He's a Woman, She's a Man (1994), and one each for Heaven Can't Wait (1995) and Big Bullet (1996). With 1996's Young and Dangerous, Chan established himself as a mainstay of the triad genre. The film was a huge success, and led to nine sequels and spinoffs before the series concluded in 2000. In 2005, Chan starred alongside Jay Chou as Kyoichi Sudo in Initial D.

Musically, Chan is known for bringing a hip hop flavour to Cantopop. With his recent releases beginning around 2002, he has rapped and added hip hop beats to his music. His hip hop style has brought him new fans, although some Hong Kong fans have accused him of acting "black." He continues to incorporate R&B and hip hop sounds into his music today.

Chan has spoken several lines of Hakka in some of his movies. He is the first singer to include Hakka verse in a Mandarin song, in "Heartless You", (算你恨) 2003.

== Political positions and stances ==
Chan was a member of the Huizhou Committee of the Chinese People's Political Consultative Conference in 2014.

Chan endorsed pro-Beijing candidate Junius Ho in the 2016 Hong Kong legislative election.

During the 2019 Hong Kong protests, Chan signed a joint letter supporting the Fugitive Offenders amendment bill, saying that he had the right to support a side "as a Hongkonger".

In March 2021, Chan expressed his support for cotton from Xinjiang, after several companies stopped purchasing the cotton due to concerns about human rights violations.

== Personal life ==
Chan married actress Cherrie Ying on 14 February 2010, at Little White Wedding Chapel in Las Vegas.

Their first child, a son, was born on 1 July 2013. On 29 May 2020, they welcomed their second child, another boy.

== Filmography ==
=== Film and television ===
Year	Title	Role	Notes	Ref.
1994	Whatever You Want			
1994	Twenty Something		Hong Kong Film Award for Best Supporting Actor; Nominated – Hong Kong Film Award for Best New Performer	
1994	In the Heat of Summer			
1994	He's a Woman, She's a Man	Yu Lo	Nominated – Hong Kong Film Award for Best Supporting Actor; Nominated – Hong Kong Film Award for Best New Performer	
1995	Heaven Can't Wait		Nominated – Hong Kong Film Award for Best Supporting Actor	
1995	01:00 A.M.	Officer #36257		
1995	The Age of Miracles			
1995	Happy Hour			
1995	Fox Hunter			
1995	Doctor Mack			
1996	Tonight Nobody Goes Home			
1996	Those Were The Days			
1996	Young and Dangerous			
1996	War of the Underworld			
1996	Young and Dangerous 2			
1996	02:00 A.M.			
1996	God of Gamblers 3: The Early Stage			
1996	Lost and Found			
1996	Queer Story			
1996	Young and Dangerous 3			
1996	Growing Up			
1996	Big Bullet		Nominated – Hong Kong Film Award for Best Supporting Actor	
1996	Who's the Woman, Who's the Man			
1997	03:00 A.M.			
1997	Kitchen			
1997	We're No Bad Guys			
1997	Alexander			
1997	A Chinese Ghost Story: The Tsui Hark Animation			
1997	The Legend of God of Gamblers			
1997	The Wedding Days			
1997	Downtown Torpedoes			
1997	Young and Dangerous 4			
1998	Hot War			
1998	Enter the Eagles			
1998	Bio Zombie			
1998	The Duke of Mount Deer			
2000	Flyin' Dance			
2000	Comeuppance			
2000	Vampire Hunter D			
2000	Born to Be King			
2000	Those Were The Days			
2000	Dial D for Demons			
2000	Killer			
2000	Help!!			
2000	Skyline Cruisers			
2002	The Wall			
2002	The Irresistible Piggies			
2002	Brotherhood			
2002	Sleeping With the Dead			
2002	The Haunted Office			
2002	The Cheaters			
2003	The Spy Dad			
2003	Men Suddenly in Black			
2003	Colour of the Truth			
2003	Diva - Ah Hey			
2004	Escape from Hong Kong Island			
2004	Throw Down			
2004	Herbal Tea			
2004	Fantasia			
2005	Initial D	Kyoichi Sudo		
2006	Wo Hu			
2006	Men Suddenly in Black 2			
2006	Lethal Angels			
2006	Bet to Basic			
2006	The Shopaholics			
2007	Lethal Angels			
2007	Who's Next			
2007	Huo Yuanjia			
2007	Word Twisters' Adventures			
2008	Kung Fu Hip Hop			
2008	Hong Kong Bronx			
2008	Legend of the Fist: Chen Zhen			
2009	Midnight Taxi			
2010	Once a Gangster			
2010	ПОСЛЕДНИЙ СЕКРЕТ МАСТЕРА			
2011	Mysterious Island			
2011	The Dragon Pearl			
2011	White Vengeance			
2012	Rhapsody of BMW			
2013	Ip Man: The Final Fight			
2014	Mr. Lucky			
2015	The Right Mistake			
2015	Jian Bing Man			
2016	Trivisa	Cheuk Tze-keung		
2016	Buddy Cops			
2016	Fooling Around Jiang Hu			
2016	Foolish Plan			
2017	Colour of the Game			
2017	OCTB			
2018	Golden Job			
2019	Someone in the Clouds			
2019	Where All Roads End			
2022	Only Fools Rush In			
2023	Extras for Chasing the Dragon	Wu Guohao		

Sources: IMDb, chinesemov.com

=== Variety show ===
- 1995–1996: Super Trio series: Movie Buff Championship
- 2015: Wanna Bros
- 2016: I Love HK
- 2017: Where Are We Going, Dad? 5
- 2021: Call Me by Fire
- 2022: Call Me by Fire (season 2)

== Discography ==
- Big Event (1997)
- Love Wife (1998)
- Everyone Loves Jordan Chan (1998)
- Picture Book (1999)
- Mega Star Jordan Chan (1999)
- Top Boyfriend (2000)
- Amazing Ending Complication (2000)
- Embrace (2001)
- Heartbroken King EP (2002)
- That's Mine (2002)
- Heartless You (2003)
- Night Life New Songs +Compilation (2003)
- Black Hole (2004)
- Compete (2006)
- Sing Jordan 10 Years New Songs + Compilation (2006)
- Exclusive Memory (2008)
