= Young and Dangerous (1996 film) =

1996 Hong Kong film by Andrew Lau

- Film poster
- Directed by: Andrew Lau
- Written by: Manfred Wong; Based on the Comic Strip by Cowman and Dickey Yau
- Produced by: Wong Jing; Manfred Wong
- Starring: Ekin Cheng; Jordan Chan; Gigi Lai; Jason Chu; Jerry Lamb; Michael Tse; Francis Ng; Simon Yam
- Cinematography: Andrew Lau
- Edited by: Marco Mak
- Music by: Clarence Hui
- Production company: Jing's Production Limited
- Distributed by: Golden Harvest Company; Warner Bros. Pictures
- Release date: 26 January 1996
- Running time: 97 minutes
- Country: Hong Kong
- Language: Cantonese/English

Young and Dangerous (Chinese: 古惑仔之人在江湖) is a 1996 Hong Kong crime film about a group of triad members, detailing their adventures and dangers in a Hong Kong Triad society. Directed by the film's cinematographer Andrew Lau, the film features a large ensemble cast, which includes Ekin Cheng, Jordan Chan, Gigi Lai, Jason Chu, Jerry Lamb, Michael Tse, Francis Ng and Simon Yam.

Based on a popular comic book series named "Guwak Tsai" or "Teddy Boy" in English. This film contributed a lot to the public image of triads and was condemned by certain quarters as glorifying secret triad societies. However, it was immensely popular in Hong Kong and spun a long list of sequels and spin-offs. Its main actors and actresses have also become major stars in their own right.

== Plot ==
Beginning in 1985, teenagers Chan Ho Nam (Ekin Cheng), his best friends "Chicken" Chiu (Jordan Chan), Dai Tin-Yee (Michael Tse), Pou Pan (Jerry Lam) and older brother Chow Pan (Jason Chu) idolise the local "Hung Hing" Society and one of its leaders, "Uncle Bee" (Ng Chi Hung). When Ho Nam and his friends are beaten by Hung Hing's "Ugly Kwan" (Francis Ng) and his men following a misunderstanding, they decide to join the society, following Bee.

Ten years later, in 1995, Ho Nam and his buddies have established themselves as Bee's enforcers, performing their first successful hit on Kwan's associate "Ba Bai" (Joe Chen). At the same time, Brother Fai Hung has the stuttering Smartie (Gigi Lai) carjack Ho Nam's Toyota MR2 and demand payment, but unfortunately she gets caught by Ho Nam and his friends and is punished by eating dozens of Chinese barbecue pork buns.

Seeing Ho Nam is making a name for himself in the society, Kwan attempts to buy him out and have Ho Nam work for him instead of Bee, but the gangster refuses. When he finds Smartie about to be forced into an adult film produced by Kwan's studio, Ho Nam takes her aside, claiming she is his woman. The indebted Smartie follows him, even beginning to fall for him. One day, Bee is tasked with an assignment by Hung Hing chairman Chiang Tin Sung (Simon Yam) to head to Macau and perform another hit. Bee orders Ho Nam and his men to execute the plan. Sadly, this was all a ploy on Kwan's doing: by using Chicken's fidelity to separate him from Ho Nam and falsifying information to chairman Chiang, Ho Nam and his remaining friends are ambushed by other triad members under Kwan. Chow Pan is brutally killed and Ho Nam is blamed for the failed hit. Friendships begin to tear apart when Chicken's girlfriend and Ho Nam are kidnapped and drugged by Kwan's men into sex, videotaping their actions as proof of violating secret society rules. With nearly all of Hung Hing looking for them, Chicken heads to Taiwan in exile.

At a Hung Hing summit, Kwan accuses Bee of failing the hit and Ho Nam for breaking the society "code" of sleeping with his best friend's woman, with the videotape as evidence. Kwan also takes the opportunity to blame chairman Chiang for not maintaining order within the society and nominates himself as the new chairman. Other branch leaders are in agreement, thus Chiang steps down and Kwan takes the head position, with only Bee opposing him. To settle things, Ho Nam is punished and banned from rejoining Hung Hing. Ten months later, Kwan orders Bee killed alongside his entire family. With most of Hung Hing siding with Kwan, and no evidence to support Kwan killing Bee, Ho Nam can do next to nothing, until Chicken returns from Taiwan, now a branch leader in a local triad and re-establishes relations with his friends. Deciding to get rid of Kwan and bring back the morally inclined Chiang, Ho Nam and Chicken bribe other branch leaders into assassinating Kwan. Working indirectly with local law enforcement, who have discovered Kwan has been smuggling cocaine using his film studio, Ho Nam and his allies manage to corner Kwan, who admits to everything. When Kwan tries to escape using Pou Pan as a hostage, he is shot and killed by a police officer for wielding a firearm and pointing at him.

Chiang returns and reclaims the position of Hung Hing chairman, congratulating Ho Nam for his efforts, ensuring his name will be well known throughout the society.

== Cast ==
- Ekin Cheng - Chan Ho Nam
- Jordan Chan - Chicken
- Gigi Lai - Smartie
- Jason Chu - Chow Pan
- Jerry Lamb - Pou Pan
- Michael Tse - Dai Tin-Yee
- Francis Ng - Ugly Kwan
- Simon Yam - Chiang Tin-Sung
- Suki Chan - Ho Yan
- Ng Chi Hung - Uncle Bee
- Joe Chen - Ba-Bai
- Ha Ping - Mrs. Lee
- Dion Lam - Silly Keung
- Spencer Lam - Father Lam
- Lee Siu-kei - Kei
- Shing Fui-On - Brother Sau
- Wang Lung-wei - Master Wai
- Wai-Man Chan - Camel Head

== See also ==
- Young and Dangerous (series)
