= Ekin Cheng =

Hong Kong actor and singer (born 1967)

- 鄭伊健
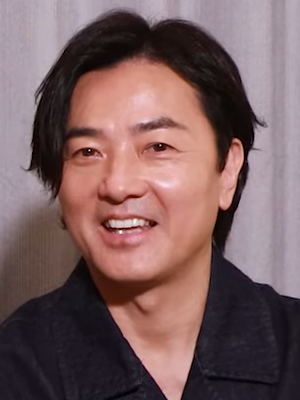
- Cheng in 2024
- Born: Cheng Yee-kin; 4 October 1967 (age 58); Hong Kong
- Other names: Dior Cheng; Noodle Cheng (鄭伊麵)
- Occupations: Singer; actor
- Years active: 1986–present
- Agents: TVB (1986–1994, 1999, 2000–2005, 2010); Lamb Production (1995–2012); Lam & Lamb Entertainment Limited (2013–present)
- Spouse: Yoyo Mung (m. 2013)
- Musical career
- Origin: Hong Kong
- Genres: Cantopop, Mandopop
- Labels: BMG (1991–2002, 2004–2006); EEG (2002–2004); BMA Records (2006–2008); Sony BMG (2009–present)

Chinese name
- Traditional Chinese: 鄭伊健
- Simplified Chinese: 郑伊健
Transcriptions
Standard Mandarin
- Hanyu Pinyin: Zhèng yījiàn
Yue: Cantonese
- Jyutping: Zeng6 Ji1-gin6
- Website: hk.myblog.yahoo.com/bmaekincheng

Ekin Cheng Yee Kin (born 4 October 1967) is a Hong Kong actor and singer. Early in his career, he used the name Dior as a first name (because that was what it sounded like when his younger sister tried to call him Second Brother (二哥)). He has also been referred to his stage name Noodle (伊麵), after a popular noodle dish with a similar name and his wavy long hair. Currently Ekin is the name used.

== Career ==
=== Television ===
Cheng began acting in commercials when he was in high school, the most well-known being for Hi-C Lemon Tea. After high school, he enrolled in TVB's Martial Arts school, but did not like it and switched to their acting school. After that he began to get a number of TV roles. The latest TVB series he participated in was Always Ready, working with Charmaine Sheh, Bowie Lam and Linda Chung. He was starred as the main character in the 2026 crime thriller TV series Million-Follower Detective on Netflix.

=== Film ===
His first film was Girls Without Tomorrow 1992 (1992) and at the time he was still called by the name Dior Cheng. He changed his name to "Ekin" before his break-out role in the Young and Dangerous series as Chan Ho-nam. The film was first meant to glorify the triad life, but after about the third film, the story focused more on the characters and explored the truth about the Hong Kong triads. It became so popular that it launched Cheng and co-star Jordan Chan to superstar status. And because of its success, it is said to have made a number of youngsters at that time fond of the triad life, thus making teens throughout Asia join the triads. It also started a trend for triad films around that time and is considered to be a classic. The film led to six sequels, all starring Cheng, and a lucrative working partnership with director Andrew Lau. Together they went on to make The Storm Riders, which was the highest-grossing Hong Kong movie at the time and the first film to use a truly large number of special effects. They also worked together on The Legend of Speed, a film about a street racer who would follow his father's footsteps of becoming a racing god, A Man Called Hero a movie adaption of the famous comic, about a martial arts master in America The Duel starring Cheng, Andy Lau, and a few other famous stars, and the comedy Women from Mars. In 2000, he acted in a movie titled Born to Be King. This is the last instalment of a triad movie series Young & Dangerous.

Cheng has branched out in the roles he has taken, including more comedy like earlier in his career with My Wife is 18 with Charlene Choi and Six Strong Guys with singers Hacken Lee, Andy Hui and George Lam. But he still does action-oriented films like The Twins Effect where he acts with rising pop superstars Twins and Tokyo Raiders where he is cast with Tony Leung and Kelly Chen. My Wife is 18 tells the story of an arranged marriage between 30-year-old Cheng and 18-year-old Charlene Choi. The significant age difference between the two is the source of the comedy. Six strong guys tells the story of Cheng and his other five friends who tell funny stories of the modern Hong Kong man. The Twins Effect is an action film about the feuds between vampires and humans who share the same world. Tokyo Raiders is about international thievery in Tokyo. He also play as Ming in the legend of zu mountain the movie.

Recently, Cheng returned to the movie scene (having taken a break in 2005 to work on the Ultraman TV series in Thailand). He had a brief appearance in My Name is Fame as himself. Soon after that he starred in Heavenly Mission, a triad/cop thriller starring alongside Stephen Fung and Alex Fong (this is not the swimmer Alex Fong.). He has completed a Pang Brothers film called The Forest of Death, which was released in March 2007. His serial filmed in mainland China based on the life of martial arts master Huo Yuanjia with former Young & Dangerous co-star Jordan Chan is currently in syndication. Current projects include a sequel to The Storm Riders, also directed by Pang Brothers and Kamui Gaiden being filmed in Japan. Cheng's latest film with Shawn Yue, Rule No. 1 directed by Kelvin Tong, won Best Actor Awards for both Cheng and Yue.

=== Music ===
Cheng had a successful music career with BMG. But in the 2000s, he signed with EEG, a juggernaut company owned by Albert Yeung. Under this company he was 'frozen' and not allowed to put out any records. But as is a custom with EEG, he made several movies with other EEG stars. As of 2004, his contract with EEG ended and he returned to BMG briefly where he released a new record before signing with BMA. As of 2009, Cheng has once again returned as an artist of Sony BMG. Through the course of his career, he has made several hits. Though some criticise Cheng for not having a voice capable of singing harder or higher-noted songs. And though his music career has been going smoothly, his most-acclaimed music came during the Young and Dangerous age. The theme song for Young and Dangerous 1 "Age of Friendship" is considered his best. Though he and Jordan Chan both sing a separate version, it was Cheng who sang it first.

In 2007, Cheng made a guest appearance at a Leo Ku concert and received popular applause from the audience. He also represented Hong Kong in the 2009 Asia Song Festival, performing two songs. Since his last concert held 11 years before, E-kin planned to hold his coming back concert during 18–19 December 2009 in Hong Kong.

=== Radio ===
In the 1990s, Cheng also starred in a number of radio dramas.

=== Others ===
In 2002 Cheng was asked to be the official Ocean Environment Ambassador. The Chief Secretary of HKSAR, Anthony Tsang presented the appointment letter. At the same press conference WWF also asked Cheng to be their Ambassador with a special interest in the marine environment. In this capacity he travelled to WWF's Whale Shark conservation site in 2007. TVB's Jade Channel aired the documentary.

2006 saw the publication of Cheng's first book, Looking into Ekin's Eyes. This book was successful and is now in its third edition. In 2007 a Japanese version of the book was published.

=== Endorsements ===
Cheng has been asked by a number of companies to endorse their products. The most notable are Canon IXUS, Seiko, Shiseido JS and HTC. In 2008, Kingsoft featured Cheng in their popular online game The First Myth 2 (封神榜II) as "Er Lang Shen" (二郎神) a character in the game.

Throughout his career Cheng has been featured in a number of magazines, and photo books, including an autobiography in Yes Idol Magazine (1997).

== Personal life ==
On 28 May 2013, Ekin Cheng married Hong Kong actress Yoyo Mung in Tokyo, Japan. Their wedding banquet was arranged in low-profile with some relatives and close friends only.
