= 2007 Astro Wah Lai Toi Drama Awards =

Hong Kong–Malaysian television awards

- Date: 26 January 2008
- Location: Sunway Pyramid

Television/radio coverage
- Network: Astro Wah Lai Toi
- Produced by: Astro, TVB

The 2007 Astro Wah Lai Toi Drama Awards (simplified Chinese: Astro华丽台电视剧大奖2007; traditional Chinese: Astro華麗臺電視劇大獎2007), presented by Astro in Malaysia, was an awards ceremony that recognised the best Hong Kong television programmes that had aired on Malaysia's Astro Wah Lai Toi in 2007. The ceremony was televised live on Astro's Cantonese channel, Astro Wah Lai Toi.

The ceremony took place on 26 January 2008 at the Sunway Pyramid in Kuala Lumpur, Malaysia. Winners were 100% based on results through popular voting, which commenced on 17 December 2007.

== Winners and nominees ==
Top five nominees are in bold.

My Favourite Actor in a Leading Role	My Favourite Actress in a Leading Role
**Roger Kwok as Ding Sheung-wong in Life Made Simple**; **Raymond Lam as Chai Foon in La Femme Desperado**; **Michael Tse as Man King-leung in La Femme Desperado**; **Steven Ma as Sheung Chi in Safe Guards**; **Moses Chan as Chai Pak-chuen / Fan Chi-chai in Land of Wealth**; Adam Cheng as Tony Chiang in Bar Bender; Bobby Au-yeung as Ko Yin-bok in Forensic Heroes; Bowie Lam as Yim Man-hei in The Dance of Passion; Kevin Cheng as Alan Shum in Under the Canopy of Love; Bosco Wong as Nick Kuen in Under the Canopy of Love	**Gigi Lai as Kai Ming-fung in The Dance of Passion**; **Jessica Hsuan as Catherine Wong in Life Made Simple**; **Sheren Tang as Hilda Hoi in La Femme Desperado**; **Charmaine Sheh as Ka Chun-fun in The Dance of Passion**; **Myolie Wu as Ku Ping-on in War and Destiny**; Ada Choi as Chiu Yuk in The Dance of Passion; Niki Chow as Ko Yat-sze in Under the Canopy of Love; Christine Ng as Emily Ching in CIB Files; Maggie Shiu as Samantha Hui in CIB Files; Sonija Kwok as Babahayi Ko-wah in Land of Wealth
My Favourite Drama	My Top 12 Favourite Characters
**Forensic Heroes**; Life Made Simple; La Femme Desperado; Safe Guards; Land of Wealth	Moses Chan as Chai Pak-chuen / Fan Chi-chai in Land of Wealth; Sonija Kwok as Babahayi Ko-wah in Land of Wealth; Gigi Lai as Kai Ming-fung in The Dance of Passion; Charmaine Sheh as Ka Chun-fun in The Dance of Passion; Roger Kwok as Ding Sheung-wong in Life Made Simple; Michael Tse as Man King-leung in La Femme Desperado; Raymond Lam as Chai Foon in La Femme Desperado; Sheren Tang as Hilda Hoi in La Femme Desperado; Myolie Wu as Ku Ping-on in War and Destiny; Steven Ma as Sheung Chi in Safe Guards; Bosco Wong as Nick Kuen in Under the Canopy of Love; Kevin Cheng as Nick Kuen in Under the Canopy of Love
My Favourite Drama Theme Song	My Favourite On-Screen Couple
**"Please Say It" (请讲) by Niki Chow and Kevin Cheng — Under the Canopy of Love**; "Always Ready" (随时候命) by Ekin Cheng — Always Ready; "Home of Friends" (会友之乡) by Steven Ma — Safe Guards; "Fortunately" (幸而) by Myolie Wu — War and Destiny; "Land of Wealth" (汇通天下) by Eason Chan — Land of Wealth	**Niki Chow and Kevin Cheng in Under the Canopy of Love**; Jessica Hsuan and Roger Kwok in Life Made Simple; Linda Chung and Ekin Cheng in Always Ready; Sheren Tang and Michael Tse in La Femme Desperado; Charmaine Sheh and Moses Chan in The Dance of Passion
My Favourite Supporting Character	My Favourite Extreme Appearance
**Wayne Lai as Sheung Chung in Safe Guards**; Benz Hui as Tong Fuk-shui in Life Made Simple; Kiki Sheung as Lee Nga-sin in The Charm Beneath; Jacky Wong as Jacky Yip in Always Ready; Ram Chiang as Sheung Ching-man in Safe Guards	**Angela Tong as Lee Siu-ho in Life Made Simple**; Roger Kwok as Ding Sheung-wong in Life Made Simple; Damian Lau as Hong Tin-yum in Men in Pain; Catherine Chau as Mau Siu-kam in The Dance of Passion; Damon Law as Flying Five in Ten Brothers
My Most Unforgettable Scene	
**Chung announces Chi as his successor after becoming leader — Wayne Lai in Safe Guards**; Ah Wong confesses that his biggest wish is to marry Catherine — Life Made Simple; Hilda finds out about Ling's betrayal — La Femme Desperado; Hei admits that he misses Fung in front of Yuk — The Dance of Passion; Chuen helplessly watches the execution of the Chai family — Land of Wealth	
