= List of Hong Kong films of 1998 =

This article lists feature-length Hong Kong films released in 1998.

== Box office ==
The highest-grossing Hong Kong films released in 1998, by domestic box office gross revenue, are as follows:

Highest-grossing films released in 1998
Rank	Title	Domestic gross
1	The Storm Riders	HK$41,556,835
2	Who Am I?	HK$38,865,415
3	The Lucky Guy	HK$27,730,525
4	The Conman	HK$17,369,190
5	A True Mob Story	HK$16,931,285
6	Young and Dangerous 5	HK$12,875,420
7	Casino	HK$10,302,710
8	Hitman	HK$10,296,825
9	Raped by an Angel 2: The Uniform Fan	HK$10,239,865
10	Ninth Happiness	HK$10,032,470

== Releases ==
Title	Director	Cast	Genre	Notes
9413	Francis Ng	Francis Ng, Christine Ng, Amanda Lee		
The Accident	Katie Kwan			
Anna Magdalena	Yee Chung-Man			
B For Boy	Mihiel Wong, Andrew Wu			
Ballistic Kiss	Donnie Yen	Donnie Yen, Annie Wu, Yu Rongguang		
Beast Cops	Gordon Chan			
Beauty of the Haunted House	Ka Ka			
The Big Hit	Kirk Wong			
Bio Zombie	Wilson Yip			
Bishōnen	Yonfan			
Blackjack	John Woo			
Blacksheep Affair	Lam Wai Lun			
Fatal Desire	Barry Jue	Michael Tse, Teresa Mak, Billy Chow, Tsukamoto Yuki, Anna Capri		
F***/Off	Abe Kwong	Dayo Wong, Cheung Tat-ming, Angela Tong, Wayne Lai, Law Lan	Comedy	
Haunted Mansion	To Lai-chi	Anthony Wong, Gigi Lai, Law Lan	Horror	
Hitman	Tung Wai	Jet Li, Eric Tsang, Simon Yam, Gigi Leung	Action / comedy	
Hold You Tight	Stanley Kwan	Sunny Chan, Chingmy Yau, Eric Tsang, Ke Yu Lun, Sandra Ng		Entered into the 48th Berlin International Film Festival
Jackie Chan: My Story	Jackie Chan	Jackie Chan	Documentary	
Knock Off	Tsui Hark	Jean-Claude Van Damme, Lela Rochon, Rob Schneider, Michael Wong, Carmen Lee, Paul Sorvino, Moses Chan, Glen Chin, Jeff Wolfe, Leslie Cheung, Mark Houghton, Wyman Wong	Action	
A Long and Forgotten Ghost Story	Cheung Siu Kin	Wayne Lai, Timmy Hung, Raymond Cho, Law Kar-ying, Law Lan	Ghost	
The Longest Nite			Drama	Copyright notice: 1997.
Magnificent Team	David Lam	Francis Ng, Christine Ng, Amanda Lee, Simon Lui, Benz Hui		
Portland Street Blues	Yip Wai Man	Sandra Ng, Kristy Yang		
PR Girls	Matt Chow	Liz Kong, Grace Lam, Wayne Lai, Angela Tong, Moses Chan		
Shanghai Affairs	Donnie Yen	Donnie Yen, Athena Chu, Yu Rongguang	Action / martial arts / frama	
The Storm Riders	Andrew Lau	Aaron Kwok, Ekin Cheng, Sonny Chiba, Kristy Yang, Michael Tse, Wayne Lai, Lawrence Cheng	Action / fantasy	
The Suspect	Ringo Lam	Louis Koo, Simon Yam, Julian Cheung, Ray Lui, Ada Choi, Eric Moo	Action, Crime, Thriller	
Troublesome Night 3	Herman Yau	Louis Koo, Vincent Kok, Lee Kin-Yan, Lee Lik-Chi, Simon Lui, Chin Kar-lok, Michael Tse, Wallis Pang, Christine Ng, Law Lan, Natalie Wong	Horror / romance / comedy	
Troublesome Night 4	Herman Yau	Louis Koo, Pauline Suen, Simon Lui, Cheung Tat-Ming, Wayne Lai, Timmy Hung, Raymond Wong	Horror / romance / comedy	
Who Am I?	Jackie Chan	Jackie Chan	Martial arts	
Young and Dangerous 5	Andrew Lau	Ekin Cheng, Shu Qi, Mark Cheng		
Young and Dangerous: The Prequel	Andrew Lau	Nicholas Tse, Francis Ng, Same Lee, Shu Qi		

== See also ==
- 1998 in Hong Kong
