= Fighting for Love (2001 film) =

2001 Hong Kong film by Joe Ma

- Film poster
- Traditional Chinese: 同居蜜友
- Simplified Chinese: 同居蜜友
- Hanyu Pinyin: Tóng Jū Mì Yǒu
- Jyutping: Tung4 Geoi1 Mat6 Jau2
- Directed by: Joe Ma
- Screenplay by: Taures Chow; Joe Ma; Aubrey Lam
- Story by: Theresa Tang; Cheung Shing-sheung; Joe Ma; Ivy Kong
- Produced by: Cheung Shing-sheung
- Starring: Tony Leung; Sammi Cheng
- Cinematography: Cheung Man-po
- Edited by: Cheung Ka-fai
- Music by: Lincoln Lo
- Production companies: Film Power Company; Singing Horse Production; Fresh Air Team
- Release date: June 9, 2001
- Running time: 102 minutes
- Country: Hong Kong
- Language: Cantonese
- Box office: HK$18.2 million

Fighting for Love is a 2001 Hong Kong romantic comedy film written and directed by Joe Ma and starring Tony Leung and Sammi Cheng.

== Plot ==
Deborah (Sammi Cheng) is a tough modern businesswoman whose primary traits seem to be chain smoking and bullying her colleagues. While going to the hospital one day to visit her sister, she manages to sideswipe Veg Cheung's (Tony Leung Chiu-wai) car; seeing this she immediately drives off.

Veg, owner of a beef noodle stall, Gat Lee, wants to pursue her but changes his mind when his sick mother demands to be brought to the hospital immediately. It so happens that he sees her car again at the hospital; when she denies breaking his mirror, he kicks her door in and they have a childish quarrel in which the police end up being called.

Advising them to settle the matter privately, Deborah agrees to meet Veg at a karaoke lounge and after they get drunk, they have what they think at the time will be a one-night stand.

Unbeknownst to Deborah, Veg actually has a girlfriend, Mindy (Niki Chow), who is also a popular television talk show host. In a series of events that go from bad to worse, Deborah then gets fired from her job for her boss, Hing Chan's wife, Bobo's mishandling of a contract, and then gets kicked out of her parents house where she has been staying, after her losing of the family dog triggers off an argument.

With nowhere to go, Deborah ends up sleeping in the hospital next to her sister, where she meets Veg, who is visiting his mother. After hearing about her predicament, Veg invites her to his home to shower, and she meets his dysfunctional family; two sisters who are always arguing, and a brother, Gary, who is continually in fear of them. His family makes a big deal out of Deborah, continually praising Mindy, and unable to take it, Veg and Deborah leave and go for a walk.

At the beef noodle shop, Deborah starts working for Veg, but she also manages to spoil the secret recipe of 30 years of work. They have to go to a rival restaurant instead to buy the bull organs.

While accompanying Veg's mother on a morning jog, she is advised against competing against Mindy for Veg. She also manages to accidentally cut Veg's mother.

Veg goes to Deborah's old office acting as a gangster to demand her pay cheque. He gives the company $50000 and asks them to issue a cheque to her for that amount. Upon hearing that Deborah has been paid, Veg's mother insists she give them a treat. While they are deciding where to go, the whole family excitedly tells Veg that Mindy is coming back from her overseas shoot the next day.

After their dinner, Deborah sees her ex colleagues and apologises for her previous behaviour.

Mindy announces to Veg that she wants to marry him and that she will change everything she is to be with him. Unable to break up with her in the face of this information, he lets himself be swayed to purchase engagement rings instead. He calls Deborah and tells her that their relationship is the one that has to end instead.

A former colleague invites Deborah to a staff party and Veg shows up holding flowers; Deborah thinks these are for her, but the truth is Mindy happens to be the MC for the staff party. Both Veg and Deborah hide from her but in an ultimate showdown, Mindy and Deborah have a big fight, and Veg realises that his true love is in fact Deborah.

== Cast ==
- Tony Leung Chiu-wai as Veg Cheung
- Sammi Cheng as Deborah Fok
- Niki Chow as Mindy
- Teresa Ha as Veg's mother
- Sammy Leung as Kelvin
- Joe Lee as Camel
- Alan Mak as Officer Mak
- Juanita Cheng as Veg's sister
- Lee Fung as Veg's mother
- Winston Yip as Deborah's father
- Chan Man-lei as Uncle Lui
- Ben Yuen as Hing Chan

== Accolades ==
Accolades
Ceremony	Category	Recipient	Outcome
21st Hong Kong Film Awards	Best Actress	Sammi Cheng	Nominated
