= Horror Hotline... Big Head Monster =

2001 Hong Kong film by Soi Cheang

- DVD cover
- Traditional Chinese: 恐怖熱線之大頭怪嬰
- Hanyu Pinyin: Kǒngbù rèxiàn zhī dàtóu guài yīng
- Directed by: Cheang Pou-soi
- Written by: Sunny Chan; Cheang Pou-soi
- Produced by: Joe Ma; Ivy Kong
- Cinematography: Ko Chiu-Lam
- Edited by: Angie Lam
- Music by: Koo Lai-Yip (古勵業)
- Production companies: Mei Ah Film Production Co., Ltd. Brilliant Idea Group (BIG) Ltd; Metroshowbiz FM99.7
- Release date: 13 September 2001
- Running time: 93 minutes
- Country: Hong Kong
- Language: Cantonese
- Box office: HK$4,592,910

Horror Hotline... Big Head Monster (Chinese: 恐怖熱線之大頭怪嬰; pinyin: Kǒngbù rèxiàn zhī dàtóu guài yīng; lit. 'Horror Hotline: Big Head Monster Baby'), also known as Horror Hotline...Big Head Monster, is a 2001 Hong Kong horror film directed by Cheang Pou-soi.

== Plot ==
While playing paintball at Mount Davis, a man named Sam encounters a ghost of a faceless woman in a red dress and her baby and becomes catatonic.

Mavis, a reporter from American TV Net, is shown around Metrobroadcast FM99.7 by Brian, who takes them to see the office of Horror Hotline, a radio talk show about the supernatural that is hosted by Ruth and Edmond and produced by Ben. Ben takes the video crew to an interview the radio show is doing with the medium Auntie Ying, who tells Mavis not to get too nosy. Mavis films the hosts talking to Chris, who tells them a story of how he and his six friends saw a "big head baby" in a cage near his boarding school in the Western District in September 1963. The next day, the crew finds eight pages of online bulletin board messages and 27 phone messages from listeners with their own stories about "Big Head". One caller says that the big head baby was a real baby born in the early 1960s who could stand up and talk like an adult just after it was born and that it fell from its bed and died. Mavis finds the address of the school Chris attended, and the two crews head to the school to investigate. They meet Connie, the adoptive daughter of the Iranian former principal of the school. She says that seven students including Chris previously visited her father.

Ben's girlfriend Helen has dreams and visions of the boy she aborted without telling Ben. Sam is admitted to the hospital where she is a nurse. That night, he sees the ghost of the woman in the red dress again. The next day, it is steamy hot in the studio, though the technician says that the air conditioning is functioning normally. Chris calls in, but they only hear laughter on the phone. The hosts go silent and motionless, and Ben kicks out the reporters. Ruth says that they felt like there was another person in the room with them. Later, boom operator Mike watches the video of that moment and is shocked.

The next day, Mike's wife Liza calls Mavis and says that Mike has gone missing. Ben, Mavis and the cameraman Dave watch the video again and see that a man with glasses can be seen next to Edmond in the video. Connie identifies the man as Chris and says that she saw him going to her father's room in the hospital that morning before she witnessed her father die. At her own hospital, Helen talks to her new patient as if he were her son and helps him draw a picture that looks like a baby with a big head, though nothing is actually visible on the paper. Connie, Ben, Mavis and Dave visit Chris's old school and find a newspaper article about a woman giving birth to a big head baby at a Western District hospital. They also find an article stating that six of the seven former students whom Connie saw visiting her father committed suicide at a factory in the Western District, but then a ghost sets fire to the newspapers.

Mavis gets a call from Mike, who says he is in a storage unit in the Western District. She keeps talking to him on the phone until they find his dead body with his blood creating a picture of a six-headed baby on the wall behind him. The police tell Mavis that Mike had already been dead for 12 hours when she found him. Ben proposes marriage to Helen. Helen sees a vision of her aborted child as she tries to go to sleep.

Mavis interviews Karen, a nurse who heard the big head baby's adult-sounding voice after its birth in 1961 when it was taken away in a cage by the police. When they enter the room where the baby was born, Dave's camera mysteriously dies. Mavis hears the voices of the nurses during the delivery, but cannot see anyone. At the other hospital, Helen calls Sam "Big Head", then calls Ben and says she is leaving, confessing that she aborted their baby.

Mavis takes Auntie Ying to the storage unit, and Auntie Ying summons the spirits of the six dead children. Ben touches the ghost of the big head baby, and Auntie Ying dies. The police tell Mavis that they found a fingerprint on Mike's glasses from Chris Kwan, who died three years earlier.

The theatrical ending shows Mavis interviewing Sam, who tells her about his encounter with the faceless woman and the caged baby at Mount Davis. The rest of the ending is shown as a video recording from the point of view of Dave's camera as Ben, Mavis and Dave go to Mount Davis and find the baby's cage as well as Helen. They are then attacked by the faceless woman.

== Alternative ending ==
The Hong Kong DVD contains the theatrical ending as well as an optional alternative ending called the "Day of the Dead" ending. This ending is shown entirely as a video recording from the point of view of Dave's camera. Mavis goes to interview Connie and asks her to talk about seeing the Big Head Monster. Chris's voice comes out of Connie's mouth, telling the same story he told on the radio show. When blood begins dripping on Mavis, she looks up and sees Helen suspended from the ceiling. Mavis tries to flee, but encounters the faceless woman in the red dress. Dave's camera drops to the floor.

On the DVD viewers are given the option to select between the two endings near the end of the film as they are watching.

== Cast ==
- Francis Ng as Ben
- Josie Ho as Mavis Ho
- Sam Lee as Sam the catatonic patient
- Niki Chow as Helen
- Michelle Zhang as Connie
- Chi Mo-Chun as Friend of Chris
- Chiu Yue-Ming as Karen
- Alan Mak as Officer Mak
- Ernest Mauser as Iranian principal
- Edmond Poon (as Poon Siu-Chung) as Edmond
- Ruth Tsang Kit-Fong (as Lo Fu) as Ruth
- Szeto Kam-Yuen
- Roy Szeto as Helen's Psychiatrist
- Wong Man-Wai as Auntie Ying
- Wilson Yip as Mavis's lawyer
- Yu Sai-Tang as Brian
- Michael Clements as Mike the boom operator (uncredited)
- Unknown actor as Dave the cameraman (uncredited)
- Unknown actress as Young Karen (uncredited)

== Reception ==
Reviewer Derek Elley of Variety wrote, "Beneath its cheesy title, there lurks one of the most inventive Hong Kong psycho-thrillers of recent years in 'Horror Hotline … Big Head Monster,' one of the very few to come close to replicating the clammy chills of late '90s Japanese pics like 'The Ring.' Stirring in a finale straight from 'Blair Witch Project,' a David Lynch-like interest in the grotesque and a dose of H.K. exaggeration, this has ready-made cult appeal across fests and ancillary outlets worldwide. Local B.O. was mild last fall, maybe because pic works more by suggestion than by delivery. [...] Performances are fine, with Ng in nicely restrained form and Ho handling her bilingual role with poise. Ko Chiu-lam’s lensing is sharp, squeezing maximum dread from minimal lighting effects. Pic is still pulp — but quality pulp."

Reviewer Kenneth Brorsson of sogoodreviews.com wrote, "Any apparent cheesiness in the story is fully ignored and Soi goes for a 100% serious horror entry. That's something you have to admire and while flawed in places, Horror Hotline...Big Head Monster turns out to be a fairly creepy and atmospheric tale. Despite the concept of the film Soi manages to create a good aura of unease, sometimes through good old fashioned horror movie trickery (a good thing in the movie). A few characters goes into dark corners of rooms and there's the always creepy things appearing in the shadows, this time in combination with a very shrill sound design."

Reviewer James of heroic-cinema.com gave the film a rating of 6 out of 10, writing, "In terms of its potential as a scary movie, I found Horror Hotline fairly successful in its eerie moments. The sound effect and music tracks offer excellent atmospheric contributions (Josie Ho’s spooked breathing is convincing … and all importantly she does have a decent scream), and a few set-pieces in obscure locations prolong and release tension effectively (especially the first warehouse scene). [...] I wonder if either of Horror Hotline’s endings will totally satisfy any viewer. Neither attempts to resolve the complex questions the narrative seems to evoke, and both are certainly light on explanation in any contextual sense imaginable (consider that a challenge). "

Reviewer Grady Hendrix of sensesofcinema.com wrote, "Horror Hotline…Big Head Monster is, on the other hand, the movie that firmly entrenched Cheang Pou-soi as a true horror auteur. HH…BHM centres around a radio call-in show about ghosts. Francis Ng plays the producer who slowly gets sucked into an annihilating mess as an urban legend about a big-headed baby keeps surfacing. Cheang’s cluttered compositions, drab office interiors, and lifeless exterior locations give us a Hong Kong drained completely of its vital force. His characters are all relentlessly absorbed with themselves, and it’s only as the movie runs them through the mill that they learn to feel some empathy for those around them. Like a sadistic emotional experiment, everything seems to be designed to get these characters to move beyond their overwhelming self-absorption. Unfortunately, once they do so they get their livers handed to them on a plate. Although the rip-off ending (it is actually a shot-for-shot steal from The Blair Witch Project [Daniel Myrick & Eduardo Sánchez, 1999]) leaves a bitter taste in the viewer’s mouth, Cheang proves that the good 2/3 of his low-budget feature is worth all of Wilson Yip’s big-budget knuckle-dragger."

Reviewer Oli of darksidereviews.com gave the film a rating of 6 out of 10, writing, "Cheang Pou-Soi's skill is undeniable. While the film may not be particularly captivating, it demonstrates a genuine desire to stand out from the crowd. Thus, Cheang Pou-Soi avoids the pitfall of over-explaining his ghosts or monsters: lacking substantial resources, it's better to rely on suggestion (the benchmark in this regard remaining Jacques Tourneur's iconic CAT PEOPLE). HORROR HOTLINE emerges as an engaging, macabre treasure hunt that remains sparing with grandiose effects, seemingly prioritizing atmosphere and character development. The result, however, remains too uneven to hold the viewer's attention in the long run: a bit more terror certainly wouldn't have hurt. Fortunately, the actors are convincing, and the story of the baby with the enormous head, told here as an urban legend (which seems to have some basis in reality, like all urban legends), is rather well done. Finally, the ending has the merit of being very immersive but leans far too heavily on THE BLAIRWITCH PROJECT…"

Reviewer John Charles of Hong Kong Digital wrote, "It was not enough to simply have the year's silliest title, this Mei Ah production also had to boast the year's silliest premise: several people join together to learn the truth about a terrifying, near-mythical creature called...The Big Head Baby (uh-huh). On top of that, the movie actually has the nerve to present its absurd storyline with the utmost seriousness, offering no comedy relief of any kind. In spite of these seemingly major debits, HORROR HOTLINE turns out to be surprisingly creepy and involving, thanks to careful direction by talented newcomer Bob Cheang Pou-soi (DIAMOND HILL), and commendable performances. In fact, the movie is so much better than expected, one ends up doubly disappointed when it resorts to an oblique and unsatisfying conclusion copied from a recent American horror hit."

A review on reellifereview.com reads, " Apart from the hilarious title, the idea of a "big headed baby" monster as a premise for a horror film seems rather silly. However, by keeping the tone serious Horror Hotline avoid the pratfalls that would make it devolve into camp and gets quite involving. The beginning is rather slow, but by mid-way point the elements merge and provide some good creepy fun. Though it's all rather formulaic using the template of Ringu in style (we even get a glimpse of a Sadako-like presence that seems thrown in) there are a couple of good spine-tingling sequences. Most of the thrills come from the tension-filled atmosphere created by the camera work, cinematography and soundtrack, all of which are proficiently handled. If there's a problem it's that the film is a bit uneven, and the story doesn't mesh with plot threads left hanging, and characters disappearing from the story. The climax, taking a cue from The Blair Witch Project, is quite effective but completely out of left field, as if it was cobbled together from another film. This ending is also pretty abrupt, leaving many questions unresolved. Mind you, these films are really made just to provide a good scare, and this one isn't very cohesive and more is left unexplained than we would prefer, it does deliver the goods. The cast is appropriate, especially Ng, and manage to round out their personas with the limitations of the material. Despite its faults, it's obvious that HK filmmaking has taken a cue from the new Asian horror trend, and Horror Hotline is a step in the right direction."

The website onderhond.com gave the film a rating of 3 out of 5 stars.
