= Dry Wood Fierce Fire =

2002 Hong Kong film by Wilson Yip

- Film poster
- Traditional Chinese: 乾柴烈火
- Simplified Chinese: 干柴烈火
- Hanyu Pinyin: Gān Chái Liè Huǒ
- Jyutping: Gon1 Cai4 Lit6 Fo2
- Directed by: Wilson Yip
- Screenplay by: Wilson Yip; Derek Kwok; Keith Ho; Eileen Yeung
- Produced by: Cheung Shing-sheung
- Starring: Louis Koo; Miriam Yeung
- Cinematography: Poon Hang-sang
- Edited by: Cheung Ka-fai
- Music by: Dennie Wong; Shu Man
- Production companies: Mandarin Films; Fresh Air Team Limited
- Distributed by: Mandarin Films Distribution
- Release date: 19 April 2002
- Running time: 97 minutes
- Country: Hong Kong
- Language: Cantonese
- Box office: HK$13,111,873

Dry Wood Fierce Fire is a 2002 Hong Kong romantic comedy film written and directed by Wilson Yip, and starring Louis Koo and Miriam Yeung. The film was released on 19 April 2002.

== Plot ==
Women's magazine, "Ladies", and Men's magazine, "Gents" were acquired by renowned writer Michelle Chan (Flora Chan), who merges them into a new magazine, "Boku". Alice (Miriam Yeung) is a journalist for "Ladies" while Ryan Li (Louis Koo) is the vice chief editor for "Gents". Alice falls in love with Ryan at first sight, but Ryan has a crush on Michelle. One time during an assignment where she travels up a mountain to interview an extraordinary person, Alice loses her glasses and calls the "Boku" office for help, where Ryan answers her call and proceeds to help her but he gets hurt from a fall. From that day on, Alice makes double-stewed soup for Ryan to heal his wound and later also helps him set up his new home. When Ryan finds out Alice's feelings for him, he purposely avoids her and Alice sadly resigns her position. However, one day while looking at the designs in his new home, Ryan misses Alice.

== Cast ==
- Louis Koo as Ryan Li, the vice chief editor of "Gents" magazine known for his good looks which attracts his female subordinates.
- Miriam Yeung as Alice Tsui (徐愛嬅), a journalist for "Gents" magazine's health column who comes from family of Chinese herbalists and martial artists.
  - Tang Suet-wah plays Alice as a teenager.
- Flora Chan as Michelle Chan (陳狄珊), a renowned writer who acquires "Ladies" and "Gents" magazine, merging them into "Boku" magazine and becomes Ryan and Alice's new boss.
- Wyman Wong as an eight-time sanda champion from Shenzhen.
- Sharon Chan as Phoebe
- Monica Lo as Ryan's ex-girlfriend.
- Lo Mang as Tsui Ying-biu (徐英彪), Alice's father who is a Chinese herbalist.
- Kingdom Yuen as Alice's mother.
- Cheung Tat-ming as Fly Chan (陳飛揚), Alice's martial uncle.
- Chapman To as Autumn Sze-to (司徒秋生)
- Matt Chow as Autumn Au-yeung (歐陽秋生)
- Nelson Cheung as Nel Nel
- Johnny Lee
- Joe Lee as Joe Li
- Wong Yat-fei as Mr. Bau (包生)
- Lee Fung as Dr. Yan
- Keith Ho as Pal Pal
- Wong So-pik as Yuko
- Chim Wai-leung as a doorman.

== Music ==
Song	Composer	Lyricist	Singer	Notes
Miss Friendship (友誼小姐)	Jason Choi	Lin Xi	Miriam Yeung	Theme song
Miriam Yeung (楊千嬅)	Eric Kwok	Lin Xi	Miriam Yeung	Insert theme

== Reception ==
=== Box office ===
The film grossed HK$13,111,873 at the Hong Kong box office during its theatrical run from 19 April to 24 May 2002.

=== Critical reception ===
Derek Elley of Variety praises the performances of Louis Koo and Miriam Yeung and calls the film "an unexpected delight among this year's Hong Kong romantic comedies." Andrew Saroch of Far East Films have the film a score of 3.5/5 stars, praising Koo and Yeung's chemistry and notes how the film used familiar approaches that does not stand out in the romantic comedy genre. Kenneth Brorsson of So Good Reviews praised Wilson Yip's direction and the performances and chemistry of Koo and Yeung, as well as Poon Hang-sang's photography and the film's natural lighting.
