= The White Dragon (film) =

2004 Hong Kong film by Wilson Yip

- Film poster
- 小白龍情海翻波 / 飛俠小白龍
- Directed by: Wilson Yip
- Written by: Wilson Yip; Law Yiu-fai
- Produced by: Joe Ma; Y.Y. Kong; Cao Biao
- Starring: Cecilia Cheung; Francis Ng; Andy On; Benz Hui; Patrick Tang; Liu Lei
- Cinematography: Cheung Man-po; Tony Miu
- Edited by: Cheung Ka-fai
- Music by: Tommy Wai
- Production companies: China Star Entertainment Group; One Hundred Years of Film Company; China Film Co-Production Corporation; Singing Horse Production; China Film Group Corporation
- Distributed by: China Star Entertainment Group; China Film Group Corporation
- Release date: 28 October 2004
- Running time: 93 minutes
- Country: Hong Kong
- Language: Cantonese

The White Dragon (小白龍情海翻波 / 飛俠小白龍) is a 2004 Hong Kong wuxia romantic comedy film starring Cecilia Cheung, Francis Ng, Andy On, Benz Hui, Patrick Tang, and Liu Lei. Directed by Wilson Yip, the film follows the story of a vigilante swordswoman attempting to win the heart of a prince.

== Synopsis ==
Black Phoenix, who is born with a beautiful appearance and comes from a privileged background, attends a school for children of elite families. After winning a beauty contest in school, she attracts the attention of the Second Prince Tianyang, who presents the award to her.

One day, a blind assassin called Chicken Feathers comes to kill the principal and gets into a fight with the janitor, who is secretly a famous martial artist known as White Dragon. During their fight, White Dragon is wounded but saved by Black Phoenix. Realising that she is about to die, White Dragon transfers all her neigong to Black Phoenix. Black Phoenix, who has no martial arts background, experiences an acne outbreak due to the overload of neigong in her body. The only way for her to prevent an acne outbreak is to perform good deeds. Since she wants to marry Tianyang, she needs to maintain her appearance so she starts robbing the rich to help the poor under the alter ego "Little White Dragon".

When Black Phoenix learns that Chicken Feathers' next target is Tianyang, she challenges him to a duel but loses to him and breaks her leg. To her surprise, Chicken Feathers spares her life and nurses her back to health. While recovering under his care, she tries to find out what his weakness is and use it to destroy him. Yet, she finds herself gradually falling in love with him, and he also has feelings for her.

Chicken Feathers discovers a letter that Black Phoenix wrote to Tianyang and realises she has affections for the prince. When he confronts her, they end up fighting and she inadvertently restores his sense of sight when she stabs her flute into his back. Black Phoenix, shocked that Chicken Feathers has seen her appearance for the first time, flees and returns home, where she hears that Tianyang has announced his decision to marry her.

Meanwhile, Chicken Feathers, who was originally hired by the First Prince Tiansheng (Tianyang's brother) to assassinate Tianyang, has given up being an assassin and returned the money to Tiansheng. In anger, Tiansheng orders the killing of all blind men in the city, forcing Chicken Feathers to step up to stop him. Under attack by Tiansheng's henchmen, Chicken Feathers is overwhelmed and captured.

When the Emperor dies, Tianyang takes the throne, causing Tiansheng to worry that Tianyang will find out that he had hired Chicken Feathers to kill him. Tiansheng then orders Chicken Feathers' execution, but Black Phoenix, dressed as "Little White Dragon", shows up and storms the execution ground to save Chicken Feathers. The film ends inconclusively without showing who Black Phoenix eventually chooses as her partner, and whether Tiansheng is ultimately brought to justice.

== Cast ==
- Cecilia Cheung as Black Phoenix ("Little White Dragon")
- Francis Ng as Chicken Feathers
- Andy On as Second Prince Tianyang
- Patrick Tang as Gene
- Kitty Yuen as Tweetie
- Benz Hui as Deer Tail
- Suet Nei as White Dragon
- Liu Lei as First Prince Tiansheng
- Huang Xiaoyu as Linda
- Dang Chi-fung as Principal Wang
- Shi Zhangjin as Eagle
- Xia Taili as the Emperor
- Meng Kai as Third Prince Tianfeng
- Liu Jingcheng as Uncle Black
- Wen Wen as Mandy
- Hu Danfeng as Daisy
- Bi Yuanbiao as Eunuch Chen
