= PR Girls =

1998 Hong Kong film by Matt Chow

- Film poster
- Directed by: Matt Chow
- Written by: Matt Chow; Joe Ma; Cheng Man-Fai
- Produced by: Joe Ma; Qian Rongwei
- Starring: Liz Kong; Grace Lam; Wayne Lai; Angela Tong; Moses Chan
- Cinematography: Chan Chi-Ying
- Edited by: Cheung Ka-Fai
- Production company: Brilliant Idea Group
- Release date: 17 October 1998
- Running time: 87 minutes
- Country: Hong Kong
- Language: Cantonese

PR Girls (Chinese: PR Girls青春援助交際; lit. 'PR Girls: Youth Assistant Relationship') is a 1998 Hong Kong drama film co-written and directed by Matt Chow.
