= The Seventh Day (TV series) =

- Official poster
- 最美麗的第七天
- Genre: Modern Romance
- Starring: Kevin Cheng; Niki Chow; Bosco Wong; Natalie Tong
- Opening theme: "最美麗的第七天" by Kevin Cheng
- Ending theme: "抱著空氣" by Kevin Cheng & Niki Chow
- Country of origin: Hong Kong
- Original language: Cantonese
- No. of episodes: 20

Production
- Producer: Amy Wong
- Running time: 25 minutes (approx.)

Original release
- Network: TVB
- Release: February 18 – March 16, 2008

Related
- Under The Canopy Of Love (2006)

The Seventh Day (Traditional Chinese: 最美麗的第七天) is a TVB modern romance series broadcast in February 2008.

Following the success of 2006's Under the Canopy of Love (天幕下的戀人), Kevin Cheng and Niki Chow collaborate again with the same cast from Under the Canopy of Love. This is Kevin Cheng and Niki Chow's third successive collaboration following 2004's Hard Fate, and 2006's Under the Canopy of Love. All three series were produced by Amy Wong. This series was filmed in Hong Kong and Japan between November 2006 to February 2007.

It is worth mentioning that with the suspension of Hong Kong analog TV broadcasting at 11:59:59 pm on November 30, 2020, the 14th episode of this series is also the analog version of TVB Jade Channel which ended on the 11th of 53 years and 11th. On the eve of the broadcast, the last show to air.

== Synopsis ==
Different people have different attitudes to love – even those born on the same day in the same year do not necessarily share the same views. Yau Chi-Wing (Kevin Cheng) and Hui Wai-Yan or Don Dum (Bosco Wong) were both born on the seventh day of August, but one takes relationships seriously while the other is very materialistic and sees love as a tool to get higher up the social ladder.

The tale begins on the seventh of August, when Wing and Don first encounter their dream girl on the same island. Wing works as a lifeguard on the outlying island. He gets to know pet shop assistant Ling Ka-Yan (Niki Chow) by chance and is soon mesmerized by her endearing personality. Don, who works at a coffee shop, meets a romance comic artist called Wong Chi-Kwan or Sasa (Natalie Tong). Being misled into believing that the girl is from a rich family, Don decides to chase her. He would never have thought that someone as calculative as himself would end up falling into a love trap.

Yan at first mistook Wing to be one of those bad guys until one night Yan saw Wing getting beat up by some gangsters. Yan helped Wing, and they became friends, and Yan secretly liked Wing. After a while, Wing introduced Yan to his grandmother and they became great friends. Yan soon finds out that Wing's birthday is almost here, so she wants to celebrate it with him; then he forgets his own birthday and Yan got mad. Wing, after a while, saw how kind and sweet Yan was, and he started liking her too. Yan's parents didn't like Wing; they wanted Yan to get together with a doctor friend, Dr. Ching Yat Long. Yan didn't listen to them and still went out with Wing.

Don saw that Sasa's parents were rich in the newspaper so he pretended to like her. On the other hand, Sasa also pretended to go out with him so that she could get ideas about relationships for her romance comic. They were both oblivious about the other pretending. Sasa did many things to make Don upset because she couldn't think of an ending for her comic. Jessie, Sasa's friend, liked Don a lot and didn't think what Sasa was doing was right. Sasa finally made Don so angry that he thought about breaking up and losing the money that he thought Sasa had. Meanwhile, Sasa couldn't think of an ending to her comic so she needed to break up with Don to know what it was like. They eventually found out they were using each other and split. However, they both realized that during the time they were pretending to go out, they had slowly developed feelings for each other. Don finally found out that Sasa wasn't rich and that it was Jessie that was.

Wing had to go to Japan to look after Yuen Ching (Selena Li) since people thought she was dead. She had AIDS and wanted Wing to take care of her because she had liked him for a very long time. Yan was sad when Wing had to leave so she decided to go to Japan a few days later to surprise him. When she got there, she found Ching's diary and inside, Ching wrote that she still had feelings for Wing and it looked like Wing liked her back. Wing was very worried about Ching and Yan started to think that Wing didn't like her anymore. Meanwhile, Yan's parents found out that she was in Japan, which made her dad extremely mad and he went to Japan to get her back. She left without letting Wing know. She needed to leave because she has Li-Fraumeni syndrome, which she got from her mother.

Don decided to date Jessie because she was rich. They started going out and Don got a new job because of her dad. All this time, Don felt sad because he missed Sasa and vice versa. Eventually Sasa got into school in Japan and left Hong Kong. Don also quit his job and restarted a company with his friends, Dino, Martin and KK. The company was called DDMK. They hired Jessie as an accountant. DDMK soon got a business opportunity from Japan. Coincidentally, the meeting place was in the same city as where Sasa was staying. Jessie became very suspicious, so Don and his friends lied to Jessie and said he was only going there to discuss business. At the last moment, Jessie also came along, because she found Don's phone which proved Don was going to meet Sasa.

Wing finally found out that Yan left because of her father and decided to leave too. But Ching's sickness kept getting worse which made him keep staying in Japan. He finally called Ching's dad to take over so that he can go back to Hong Kong. Yan went to the doctors and found out that she had a cancer tumor in her brain. She found out a while later she has multiple cancers. When Wing came back, she broke up with him because she didn't want him to feel that he had to take care of her, but Wing wouldn't stop asking why. To hide the fact that she has cancer, Yan said that she was angry that Wing spent so much time with Ching and that she now has feelings for Dr. Long. This made Wing leave her alone temporarily.

In Japan, Don tried to spend time with Sasa as much he could when Jessie wasn't around. One night Don and Sasa got drunk and they woke up in Sasa's bed together. Sasa thought that he was in Japan alone so when someone knocked Don and Sasa opened the door together and saw Jessie in the doorway. Jessie was furious and kept on asking why he was with Sasa and Sasa kept on asking Don why he didn't tell her that Jessie was here or why they hadn't broken up yet. Sasa kicked both Jessie and Don out and Don didn't know what to do. He decided try to make things better with Sasa, but she ignored him. He left Japan to find Jessie and explain everything to her. He promised to come back and see Sasa.

Yan had to do an operation to get rid of the tumor in her brain. She refused to do it because she felt that her life no longer had meaning without Wing. In desperation, Yan's father, who disliked Wing from the beginning, begged him to try to convince Yan to do the operation. Wing then persuaded Yan to do the surgery, but only if he promised to never see her again. After the successful operation, Yan went to Wing's apartment to clear things up. She told Wing why she had to break up with him which finally made him understand. They got back together and decided to get married.

Yan knew that she had an incurable disease and that she might die because of it. She wanted Wing to have someone to live for even if she left him, so they decided to have a baby together. The only problem was if they did it would get Li-Fraumeni syndrome from Yan. They consulted Long and he said they could try artificial insemination. A while later, Wing gets promoted to the senior position in his job as an interior designer, and the same day Yan visits his office and announces to everyone that she is pregnant. The couple is overjoyed.

Meanwhile, Don flew back to Hong Kong and broke up with Jessie. He then rushed back to Japan where he confronts Sasa about her being pregnant. Sasa then insisted that she had a new boyfriend, and that the baby was his. Because Don couldn't speak Japanese, and Sasa's 'boyfriend' couldn't speak Chinese, Don couldn't understand when he protested the baby was Don's. Sasa took advantage of this and said that her 'boyfriend' was defending her. Don got really angry at him and they got into a fight. When he saw Sasa acting very concerned about her 'boyfriend', he left angrily. Back at his hotel, he called Martin (who could understand Japanese) and explained the whole story. Martin translated what he said and told him that Sasa's child was Don's.

After Yan was pregnant she suddenly suffered an epilepsy. Long discovered that her brain tumor was back and suggested Yan get an abortion. Yan refused, even though her family begged her to. Wing was deeply touched but also heartbroken. When Yan was seven months pregnant, her brain tumor caused her to not be able to speak. Her family and Wing decided they couldn't wait any longer and Yan had to get a Caesarian operation to get the baby out and remove the tumor.

Meanwhile, Sasa reluctantly admitted the baby was Don's, but she didn't want him to have anything to do with the baby. Don finally persuaded her, just before Sasa wants to give birth on the street. With both Yan and Sasa about to give birth, Wing and Don coincidentally meet each other in the hospital. When the doctors come out one at a time, they announce that both couples now have a daughter. Everyone is ecstatic.

After Yan gave birth and removed her tumor, Wing fulfilled a promise which was that when Yan gave birth to a healthy baby and removed her tumor they would all go as a family to a beautiful place in Japan. The family continues the tradition faithfully, but after five and a half years, Yan dies from cancer. Wing keeps the tradition going. Meanwhile, Don and Sasa get married.

The series ends on the two little girls' birthday, which is on the same day, like their fathers. Wing and Don once again meet each other on the street and the fathers return to their families.

== Main cast ==
Cast	Role	Description
Kevin Cheng	Yau Chi-Wing (Wayne) 游志穎	Lifeguard; Interior Designer; Ling Ka-Yan's boyfriend/husband.
Niki Chow	Ling Ka-Yan (Niki) 凌加恩	Pet Shop Owner; Yau Chi-Wing's girlfriend/wife.
Bosco Wong	Hui Wai-Yan (Don/Don Dum) 許懷仁	Entrepreneur; Wong Chi-Kwan's boyfriend/husband
Natalie Tong	Wong Chi-Kwan (Sasa) 王芷君	Writer/Artist; Hui Wai-Yan's girlfriend/wife

== Recurring cast ==
Cast	Role	Description
Elaine Yiu	Yeung Hau-Yi (Jade) 楊巧兒	Ling Ka-Yan's younger cousin. Wong Chi-Kwan's co-worker.
Joel Chan (陳山聰)	Ma Tin-Fuk (Martin) 馬天福	Tour Guide; Hui Wai-Yan's friend/business partner.
Lau Dan	Ling Siu-Gaai 凌兆佳	Mall Security Consultant; Ling Ka-Yan's father. Ling Bo-Tse's older brother.
Kiki Sheung	Ling Bo-Tze 凌寶芝	Ling Ka-Yan's aunt. Ling Siu-Gaai's younger sister.
Selena Li	Yuen Ching (Miko) 阮靜	AIDS Patient; Ling Ka-Yan friend Yau Chi-Wing's ex-girlfriend.
Charmaine Li	Wong Wai (Jessie) 王慧	Wong Chi-Kwan's friend.Hui Wai Yan's ex-girlfriend.
Eddie Li	Li Kin-Kwok (KK) 李建國	Hui Wai-Yan's friend/business partner.Julie's boyfriend.
Sam Chan	Shek Ka-Wing (Dino) 石家榮	Hui Wai-Yan's friend/business partner.
Suki Chui	Hui Mei-Na (Ella) 許美娜	Hui Wai-Yan's younger sister.

== Viewership ratings ==
Week		Episode	Average points	Peaking points	References
1	February 18, February 20–22, 2008	1 — 4	27	30	
2	February 25–29, 2008	5 — 9	27	28	
3	March 3–7, 2008	10 — 14	27	29	
4	March 10–14, 2008	15 — 19	28	31	
5	March 16, 2008	20	34	35	

== Awards and nominations ==
41st TVB Anniversary Awards (2008)

- "Best Drama" (Nominated)
- "Best Actress" Natalie Tong (Nominated)
