= Cheung Ka-fai =

Cheung Ka-Fai may refer to:

- Nick Cheung (born 1964), Hong Kong actor
- Cheung Ka-fai (film editor), Hong Kong film editor and director
