= The Lion Roars =

2002 Hong Kong film by Joe Ma

- Film poster
- Traditional Chinese: 我家有一隻河東獅
- Simplified Chinese: 我家有一只河东狮
- Hanyu Pinyin: Wǒ Jiā Yǒu Yī Zhǐ Hé Dōng Shī
- Jyutping: Ngo2 Gaa1 Jau2 Jat1 Zek3 Ho4 Dung1 Si1
- Directed by: Joe Ma
- Written by: Joe Ma; Sunny Chan; Felix Chong; Ivy Kong; Frankie Chung; Suen Ho-ho
- Produced by: Joe Ma; Ivy Kong; Thomas Leong
- Starring: Louis Koo; Cecilia Cheung
- Cinematography: Cheung Man-po
- Edited by: Angie Lam
- Music by: Lincoln Lo
- Production companies: China Star Entertainment Group; One Hundred Years of Film; China Film Co-Production Corporation; Youth Film Studio; Singing Horse Production
- Distributed by: China Star Entertainment Group
- Release date: 28 September 2002 (Hong Kong)
- Running time: 98 minutes
- Country: Hong Kong
- Language: Cantonese
- Box office: HK$11.9 million

The Lion Roars is a 2002 Hong Kong comedy film produced and directed by Joe Ma. The film starred Louis Koo and Cecilia Cheung

== Plot ==
During the Soong Dynasty, a beautiful woman named Moth Liu is searching for a husband, but is unable to find one until she hears the avant-garde poetry of Seasonal Chan. Soon the two are married and Chan discovers that his new bride is violently temperamental and insanely jealous, who limits his activities and lifestyle. When a princess falls in love with the poet and the Emperor decrees that Chan must take the princess in as a second-wife. The love between Liu and Chan is put to the test.

== Cast ==
- Louis Koo as Seasonal Chan
- Cecilia Cheung as Moth Liu
- Benz Hui as So Tung-po
- Wyman Wong as Super Double Baldes Liu
- Fan Bingbing as Princess Ping'an
- Raymond Wong Ho-yin as Long
- Mou Jian as Emperor
- Emotion Cheung as Wong Choy
- Joe Lee as Yau
