= Matt Chow =

Hong Kong actor, screenwriter, and director

- Born: August 4, 1968 (age 58); Hong Kong
- Occupations: screenwriter; film producer; actor; film director
- Awards: Hong Kong Film Critics Society Awards – Best Screenplay; 2004 Bullets Over Summer (shared with Wilson Yip and Ben Cheung)

Chinese name
- Traditional Chinese: 鄒凱光
- Simplified Chinese: 邹凯光
Transcriptions
Standard Mandarin
- Hanyu Pinyin: Zōu1 Kǎi3 Guāng1
Yue: Cantonese
- Jyutping: Jau1 Hoi2 Gwong1
- Musical career
- Also known as: Matthew Chow

Matthew Chow Hoi-Kwong (Chinese: 鄒凱光, born 4 August 1968) is a Hong Kong screenwriter, director, actor and producer. He is best known for his romantic comedy films, and has served as a screenwriter for filmmakers Peter Chan, Johnnie To, Wai Ka-Fai, and Joe Ma.

== Career ==
Matt Chow started his career at TVB in 1989 when he was hired by Joe Ma, who Chow considers to be his friend, teacher and boss.

== Filmography ==
=== Producer ===
- Ghost Office (2001)
- Let's Sing Along (2001)

=== Story ===
- Let's Sing Along (2001)

=== Director ===
- L - O - V - E ..... LOVE (1997)
- PR Girls (1998)
- United We Stand, And Swim (2001)
- Let's Sing Along (2001)
- The Attractive One (2004)
- Itchy Heart (2004)
- Golden Chicken 3 (2014)
- 12 Golden Ducks (2015)
- Triumph in the Skies (2015)

=== Actor ===
- Feel 100%, Once More (1996)
- Feel 100% (1996)
- July 13th (1996)
- Till Death Do Us Laugh (1996)
- They Don't Care About Us (1996)
- First Love Unlimited (1997)
- He Comes from Planet K (1997)
- Haunted Karaoke (1997)
- L - O - V - E ..... LOVE (1997)
- Too Many Ways To Be No. 1 (1997)
- F***/Off (1998)
- Portland Street Blues (1998)
- Love Generation Hong Kong (1998)
- Nude Fear (1998)
- Bio Zombie (1998)
- PR Girls (1998)
- Afraid of Nothing, the Jobless King (1999)
- Bullets Over Summer (1999)
- Ghost Office (2001)
- La Brassiere (2001)
- Everyday Is Valentine (2001)
- You Shoot, I Shoot (2001)
- Shadow (2001)
- Feel 100% II (2001)
- Women From Mars (2002)
- The Irresistible Piggies (2002)
- Dry Wood Fierce Fire (2002)
- Beauty and the Breast (2002)
- Fighting to Survive (2002)
- Summer Breeze of Love (2002)
- Fat Choi Spirit (2002)
- Happy Family (2002)
- Love Undercover (2002)
- Loving Him (2002)
- The Mummy, Aged 19 (2002)
- U-Man (2002)
- Star Runner (2003)
- Sound of Colors (2003)
- The Twins Effect (2003)
- Naked Ambition (2003)
- Love Is a Many Stupid Thing (2004)
- Hidden Heroes (2004)
- Three of a Kind (2004)
- Kung Fu Mahjong 2 (2005)
- Home Sweet Home (2005)
- A.V. (2005)
- Love Undercover 3 (2006)
- Dating a Vampire (2006)
- Wife From Hell (2006)
- House of Mahjong (2007)
- Overheard 2 (2011)
- All's Well, Ends Well 2012 (2012)
- Mr. and Mrs. Gambler (2012)
- Vulgaria (2012)
- Diva (2012)
- SDU: Sex Duties Unit (2013)
- Full Strike (2015)
- Love off the Cuff (2017)
- First Night Nerves (2018)
- Missbehavior (2019)
- Raging Fire (2021)

=== Writer ===
- Hero from Beyond the Boundary of Time (1993)
- The Avenging Quartet (1993)
- Idol (1993)
- A Deadly Way (1994)
- The Day that Doesn't Exist (1995)
- Lying Hero (1995)
- The Little Drunken Masters (1995)
- Till Death Do Us Laugh (1996)
- Feel 100% (1996)
- Shanghai Grand (1996)
- July 13th (1996)
- He Comes from Planet K (1997)
- Too Many Ways To Be No. 1 (1997)
- Love, Amoeba Style (1997)
- L - O - V - E ..... LOVE (1997)
- First Love Unlimited (1997)
- Bio Zombie (1998)
- PR Girls (1998)
- Bullets Over Summer (1999)
- Juliet in Love (2000)
- Ghost Office (2001)
- United We Stand, And Swim (2001)
- Let's Sing Along (2001)
- Three: Going Home (2002)
- Golden Chicken (2002)
- Three (2002)
- Women From Mars (2002)
- Diva . Ah Hey (2003)
- The Attractive One (2004)
- Three of a Kind (2004)
- Itchy Heart (2004)
- Love Undercover 3 (2006)
- Dog Bite Dog (2006)
- Golden Chicken 3 (2014)
- Chilli Laugh Story (2022)
