= Three of a Kind (2004 film) =

2004 Hong Kong film by Joe Ma

- Film poster
- Traditional Chinese: 煎釀叄寶
- Simplified Chinese: 煎酿叁宝
- Hanyu Pinyin: Jiān Niàng Sān Bǎo
- Jyutping: Zin1 Jeong4 Saam1 Bou2
- Directed by: Joe Ma
- Screenplay by: Joe Ma; Matt Chow; Sunny Chan; Lung Man-hong; Lee Chun-fai
- Produced by: Joe Ma; Ivy Kong; Cao Biao
- Starring: Michael Hui; Miriam Yeung; Lau Ching-wan
- Cinematography: Ko Chiu-lam
- Edited by: Angie Lam
- Music by: Lincoln Lo
- Production companies: China Star Entertainment Group; One Hundred Years of Film; China Film group Singing Horse Productions; China Film Co-Production
- Distributed by: China Star Entertainment Group
- Release date: July 27, 2004 (Hong Kong)
- Running time: 102 minutes
- Country: Hong Kong
- Language: Cantonese
- Box office: HK$14,790,180

Three of a Kind (Chinese: 煎釀叄寶) is a 2004 Hong Kong comedy film written, produced and directed by Joe Ma and starring Michael Hui, Miriam Yeung and Lau Ching-wan.

== Cast and roles ==
- Michael Hui as Dragon Lone
- Miriam Yeung as Sophia
- Lau Ching-wan as Frankie
- Elaine Jin as Barbara
- Benz Hui as P Leung
- Lo Mang as Lone's dad
- Hiro Hayama as Alex
- Monica Lo as Isabel
- Yuan Yuan as Mr. Tang
- Jin Song as Jet
- Kristal Tin as Victoria
- Tiffany Lee as Loretta
- Courtney Wu as Advertising agency owner
- Matt Chow as Slipper game attendant
- Chin Wing-wai as Tony Qua
- Wong Chui-yee as Lone's mother
- Chan Pak-lei as HK Gifted Writer (20 years old)
- Harriet Yeung as HK Gifted Writer (20 years old)
- Chiu Yue-ming as HK Gifted Writer (20 years old)
- Cheung Nam as Lone's one-eyed monk character
- Shao Xiao-shan as Lone's heroine character
- Kong Foo-keung as Rascal
