= Bio Zombie =

1998 Hong Kong film by Wilson Yip

- Film poster
- Directed by: Wilson Yip
- Written by: Matt Chow; So Man-Sing; Wilson Yip
- Produced by: Joe Ma
- Starring: Jordan Chan; Sam Lee; Angela Tong; Wayne Lai
- Cinematography: Keung Kwok-Man
- Edited by: Cheung Ka-Fai
- Music by: Peter Kam
- Distributed by: Media Blasters (U.S. DVD)
- Release date: 6 November 1998
- Running time: 94 minutes
- Country: Hong Kong
- Language: Cantonese
- Box office: HK$6,207,050 (Hong Kong)

Bio Zombie (simplified Chinese: 生化寿尸; traditional Chinese: 生化壽屍; pinyin: Shēng Huà Shòu Shī; Jyutping: Sang1 Faa3 Sau6 Si1) is a 1998 Hong Kong zombie comedy film, starring Jordan Chan. It spoofs George A. Romero's Dawn of the Dead and shows many similarities to Peter Jackson's Braindead.

== Plot ==
Woody Invincible and Crazy Bee are two young men selling bootlegged VCDs at a small stall in the New Trend Plaza Mall, and spend time gambling and thieving from other shops. They meet Rolls, an employee at the beauty parlor, then have a run-in with Mr. Kui, the cellphone store owner. Rolls frequents a sushi bar in the mall, and flirts with the waiter Loi, who is smitten with her.

Elsewhere, black market dealers sell to three government agents a bioweapon which turns people into zombies. They brought a zombie to demonstrate the substance's effect, but it breaks out and kills two agents. On the way back after picking up their boss's fixed car, Woody hits the surviving agent, who is carrying a sample of a bioweapon contained in a soft drink bottle. Thinking he needs a drink, Woody pours the sample into his mouth. The two bring him back to the mall, and Woody damages the car again. The reanimated agent slips out of the car, dropping his cellphone.

Woody sells the cellphone to Kui, but still does not have enough money to fix the car. Woody and Bee then steal Rolls' money and ring. A suspicious Rolls asks Woody to find the robbers in return for a free meal. She intends to get him drunk, so he would admit to the robbery. At the sushi bar, they get drunk, and Woody and Rolls head to the bathroom to have sex. Loi follows them, but is attacked by the zombified agent, and interrupts Woody and Rolls in an attempt to warn them about the zombie.

Loi becomes a zombie himself and takes Rolls captive. The agent retrieves his cellphone from Kui's shop. Kui accuses Woody and Bee of theft, and Ox, a security guard, calls the police. Two policemen, badge numbers #3001 and #9466, question the Kui's, Woody and Bee. Woody and Bee's behaviors makes the officers suspicious, and #9466 eventually handcuffs them in the security guard's office. While #3001 searches the mall for witnesses to the theft, he is killed by Loi.

The agent bursts into the security office, kills Ox and attacks #9466. The policeman kills the zombie, but dies from his injuries. Bee gets the handcuff key from #9466, and frees himself and Woody. The two heads to the mall entrance, and sees Jelly, Rolls' co-worker, who just got back after a walk. The reanimated Ox remotely closes the mall's shutter, trapping everyone inside. The three then meets the Kui's, and the group hides in the beauty parlor.

Woody heads out alone to call the police. He rescues Rolls while Loi is distracted fighting off other zombies who want to attack her, and they return to the beauty parlor. The group decide to board an elevator and escape, but it cannot move due to the weight limit. As a zombie approaches, Kui pushes Jelly out. The rest of the group leaves Kui behind to rescue Jelly, but find her dead. On the way to the security office, both Mrs. and Mr. Kui are killed by zombies. Bee, distracted by Mrs. Kui's death, is bitten.

At the security office, Woody, Rolls and Bee cannot find the security key to open the entrance door. After saying his last words, Bee is killed by Ox. Enraged, Woody beheads Ox, then cuts off Bee's head before he reanimates. Woody and Rolls head down the parking garage, now crawling with zombies. Fighting their way through the shambling undead, they reach Woody's boss's car. Loi appears, lifts up the garage shutter, then pushes the car out so that the two can escape.

At a gas station, Woody is unable to find a working phone. He sees an emergency broadcast which warns people against drinking soft drinks, as they may contain a biochemical substance. Looking outside, Woody sees Rolls drinking from the bottle which he earlier took from the agent. He re-enters the car, and Rolls asks him if he was able to contact any authorities. Woody looks at her and drinks the remainder of the soft drink.

== Cast ==
- Jordan Chan as Woody Invincible
- Sam Lee as Crazy Bee
- Angela Tong as Rolls
- Chow Hoi-san as Jelly
- Wayne Lai as Kui
- Emotion Cheung as Loi
- Tam Tak-chi as Policeman #3001
- Chan Chi-chuen as Policeman #9466
- Yeung Wing Cheung as Chinki Zombie
- Frankie Chan as Ox
- Ronny Ching as Chan Kam-Shing
- Matt Chow as Shing's Assistant
- Ken Lok

Voice cast (English version):

- Sparky Thornton as Woody Invincible
- David Umansky as Crazy Bee
- Matt K. Miller as Kui
- Bob Bobson as VCD Nerd
- Francis Cherry as Man A
- Richard Epcar as Ox
- Tara Jayne as Jelly
- Steve Kramer as Yung/Zombies
- Wendee Lee as Rolls
- Dave Mallow as Loi
- Dorothy Melendrez as Mrs. Kui / TV announcer / Cindy
- Anthony Mozdy as Boss / Sushi Chef / Movie Actor 1 / Zombies

== Production ==
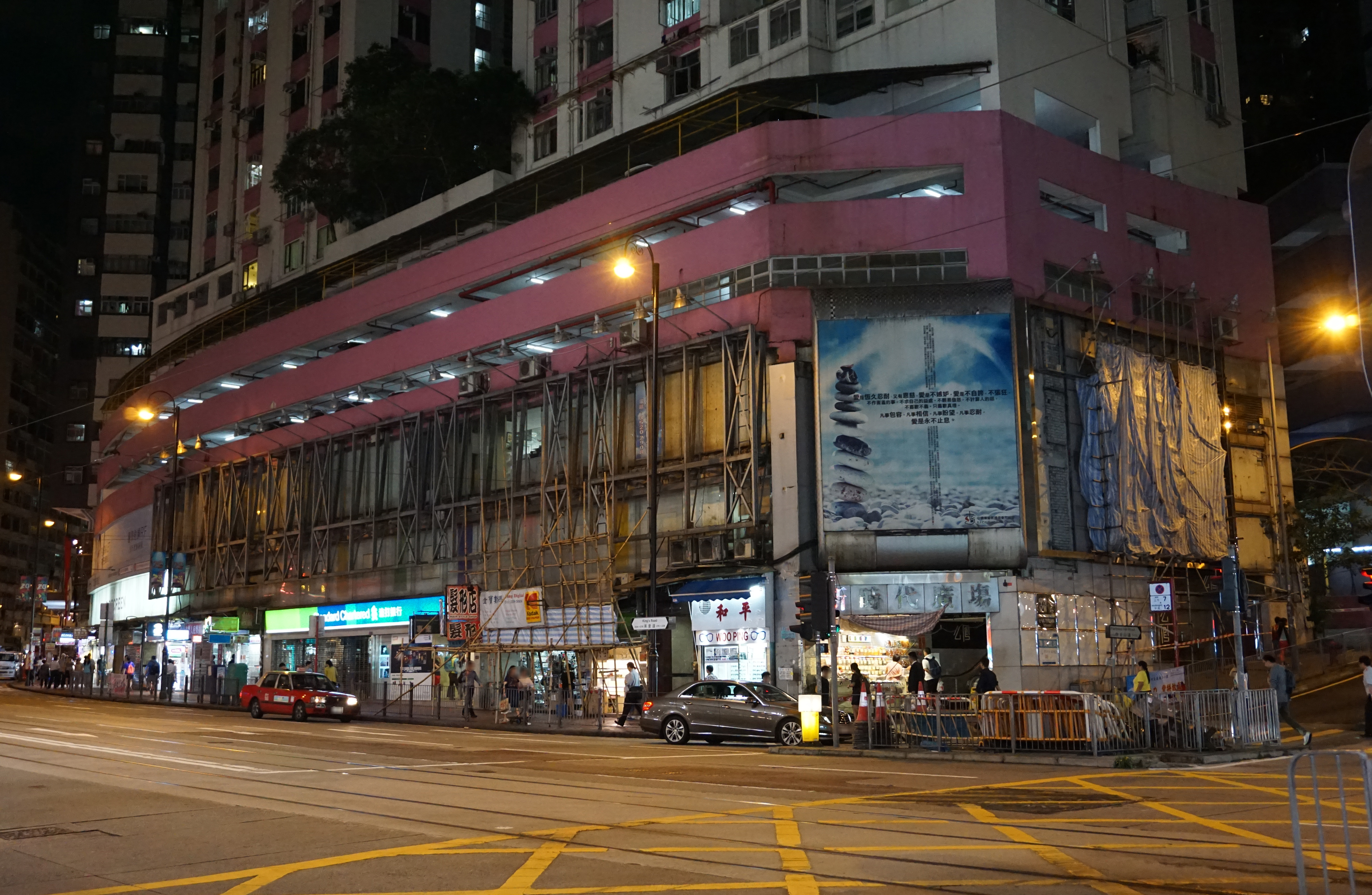
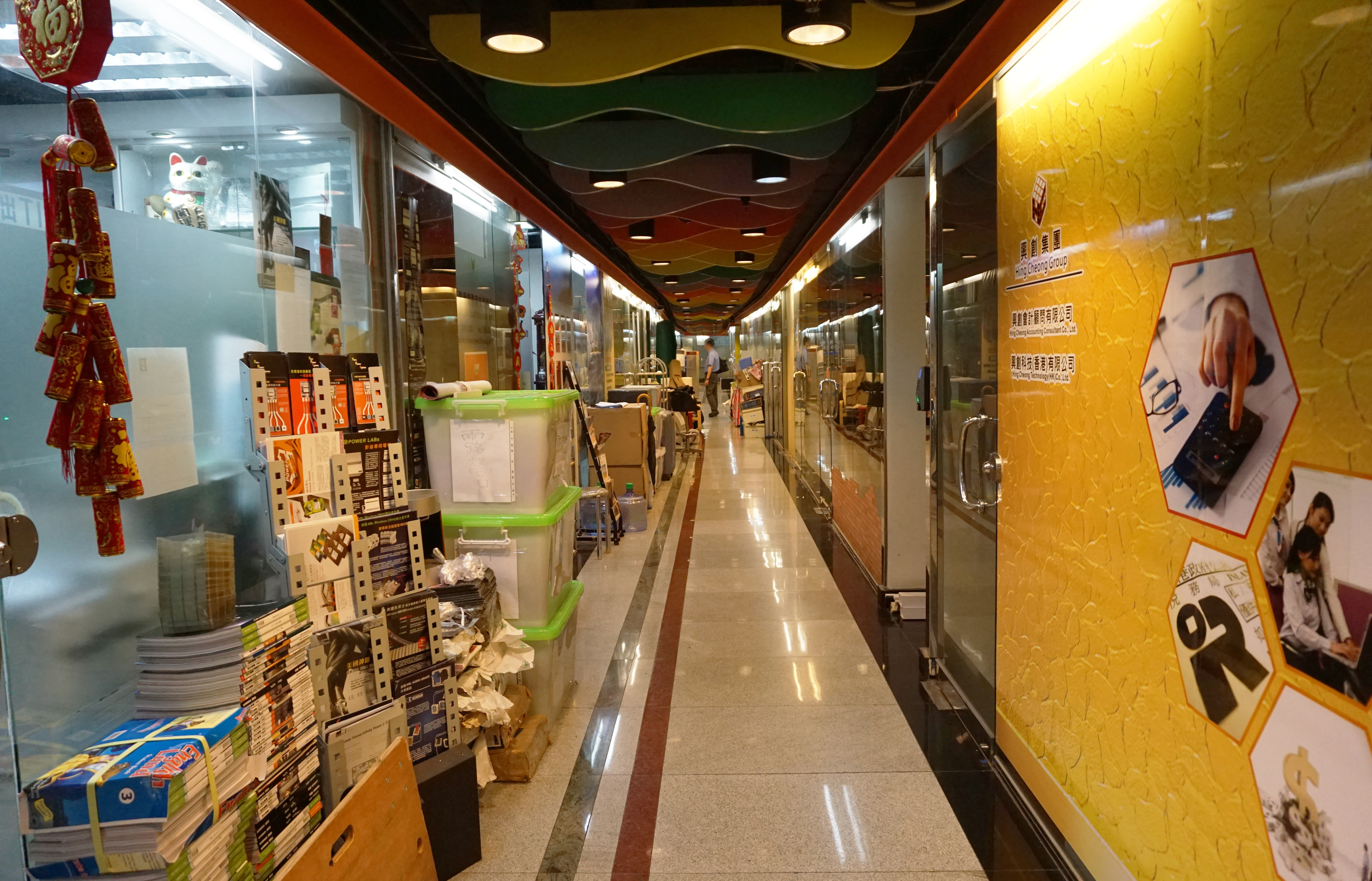
The exterior and the first floor interior of the New Trend Plaza in 2017

Bio Zombie was filmed at the New Trend Plaza shopping mall in North Point.

== Box office ==
The film grossed HK$6,207,050 at the Hong Kong box office during its theatrical run from 11 June to 30 June 1998 in Hong Kong.

== Release ==
The film was also released as Hong Kong Zombie.
