= Ghetto Justice =

Hong Kong television series

- Official poster
- 怒火街頭
- Genre: Legal drama Comedy
- Created by: Terry Tong Kei-ming
- Written by: Nota Manh
- Starring: Kevin Cheng; Myolie Wu; Sharon Chan; Sam Lee; Alex Lam; Joyce Tang; Shek Sau; Eddie Kwan; Mandy Wong
- Theme music composer: Hanjin Tan
- Opening theme: No Time to Regret by Hanjin Tan and M.C. Jin
- Country of origin: Hong Kong
- Original language: Cantonese
- No. of episodes: 20

Production
- Production location: Hong Kong
- Camera setup: Multi-camera
- Running time: 45 minutes (approx.)
- Production company: TVB

Original release
- Network: TVB Jade
- Release: 30 May – 24 June 2011

Related
- Ghetto Justice II (2012)

Ghetto Justice
- intertitle
- Traditional Chinese: 怒火街頭
- Simplified Chinese: 怒火街头
- Literal meaning: "Fury Street Corner"
Transcriptions
Standard Mandarin
- Hanyu Pinyin: Nù Huǒ Jiē Tōu
Yue: Cantonese
- Jyutping: Nou6 Fo2 Gaai1 Tau4

Ghetto Justice (Traditional Chinese: 怒火街頭) is a TVB modern drama series about a former talented lawyer who fights injustice for the people of the Sham Shui Po district in Hong Kong, starring Kevin Cheng, Myolie Wu, Sharon Chan and Sam Lee as the main cast. The series became a success and was followed by a sequel, Ghetto Justice II.

== Plot ==
Growing up in Sham Shui Po Kris Wong Si-fu (Myolie Wu) is an aspiring barrister who wishes to leave behind her grass root beginnings; her greatest desire being to share chambers with renowned barrister Spencer Cheung Pak-kei (Shek Sau). A resident of Sham Shui Po, Law Lik-ah (Kevin Cheng) runs a legal clinic at a social centre with his cousin George Mike, Jr (Alex Lam) and social worker Tin Ka-fu (Sam Lee). After several run-ins and misunderstandings with Kris, Law begins to have feelings for Kris, however Kris holds the unkept and uncouth Law in utter disdain.

Although he has limited himself to just giving advice when a friend falls foul of the law, Law Lik-ah decides to act in court once more. To her amazement Kris discovers that Law Lik-ah used to be known by the nickname LA Law, a barrister almost as famous as Spencer Cheung, and who disappeared from the legal profession after being in contempt of court.

As they co-operate on different cases Kris learns the reason for Law's premature retirement. In order to defend a client on a murder case, Law accused the brother of the victim of the crime, which although unprovable, cast so much doubt as to the guilt of his client that his client was acquitted. However the innocent man was unable to live with the accusation and killed himself. Kris initially holds that a barrister should defend her client with whatever means available and that it is up to the judge and jury to decide guilt. However, as they encounter wealthy individuals who attempt to use the law to escape justice she comes to accept that in addition to possible fame and remuneration a barrister should have a conscience. As they come to understand each other they become lovers, and Law decides to open chambers again in order to be able to provide for Kris.

When Kris's friend Ho Lee-ching (Sharon Chan) stumbles on Spencer's illegal machinations she is murdered. In order to gain justice for Lee-ching, Kris feigns indifference to her death and joining Spencer's legal team creates a scenario in which he incriminates himself. Calculating what Kris intends, Law acts to protect Kris and her ability to continue to be a barrister, he arranges evidence about the plot to point towards himself, and is disbarred and sentenced for two years in her stead.

== Cast ==
=== Sham Shui Po Civic Legal Advice Centre ===
Cast	Role	Description
Kevin Cheng	Law Lik-ah 羅力亞	A barrister Mai Bo's nephew Mai George's cousin Wong Si-fu's boyfriend Tai-Ng Ting's supervisor Took blame for perverting the course of justice, sentenced to 2-year jail and revoked barrister license in Episode 20
Sam Lee	Ting Ka-fu 丁家富	A social worker and a legal advice centre owner Ting Fuk-yuen and Tam Wing-chau's son Law Lik-ah and But Chik's friend Ho Lee-ching's boyfriend
Alex Lam	George Mike Jr. 米佐治	MJ; A solicitor Mai Bo's son Law Lik-a's cousin
Joyce Tang	Tai-Ng Ting 第五婷	A restaurant waitress, later legal executive Law Lik-ah's assistant Tsui Kiu's daughter-in-law Leung Fung's separated wife

=== Wong's family ===
Cast	Role	Description
Ching Hor-wai	Poon Siu-king 潘小琼	A noodle restaurant owner Wong Si-fu, Wong Yik-tim and Wong Si-yuen's mother
Myolie Wu	Wong Si-fu, Kris 王思苦	A barrister Poon Siu-king's daughter Wong Yik-tim and Wong Si-yuen's sister Law Lik-ah's girlfriend
Destiny Cheng	Wong Yik-tim 王憶甜	Poon Siu-king's daughter Wong Si-fu and Wong Si-yuen's sister
Choi Yiu-lik	Wong Si-yuen 王思源	Poon Siu-king's son Wong Si-fu and Wong Yik-tim's brother

=== Ting's family ===
Cast	Role	Description
Chun Wong	Ting Fuk-yuen 丁福元	A restaurant group owner Tam Wing-chau's husband Ting Ka-fu's father
Ting Chu-wai	Tam Wing-chau 譚詠秋	Ting Fuk-yuen's wife Ting Ka-fu's mother
Sam Lee	Ting Ka-fu 丁家富	Ting Fuk-yuen and Tam Wing-chau's son

=== Mai's family ===
Cast	Role	Description
Kwok Fung	Mai Bo 米布	George Mike; A retired justice Mik George's father Law Lik-ah's uncle
Alex Lam	Mai Cho-chi, George 米佐治	MJ; A solicitor Mai Bo's son Law Lik-ah's cousin Loved Tai-Ng Ting

=== Leung's family ===
Cast	Role	Description
Lily Leung	Tsui Kiu 徐嬌	Leung Fung's mother Tai-Ng Ting's mother-in-law Leung Yau-shun and Leung Yau-yee's grandmother
Ngai Wai Man	Leung Fung 梁風	Tsui Fung's son Tai-Ng Ting's separated husband Leung Yau-shun and Leung Yau-yee's father Threatened Tai-Ng Ting and Mai George (Villain)
Joyce Tang	Tai-Ng Ting 第五婷	Tsui Fung's daughter-in-law Leung Fung's separated wife Leung Yau-shun and Leung Yau-yee's mother
Chan Wing-lam	Leung Yau-shun 梁有信	Tsui Kiu's granddaughter Leung Fung and Tai-Ng Ting's daughter Leung Yau Yee's sister
Cadmus Chan	Leung Yau-yee 梁有義	Tsui Kiu's grandson Leung Fung and Tai-Ng Ting's son Leung Yau-shun's brother

=== Legal cases ===
==== Sheung Chau-ping murder (Episode 2 - 4) ====
Cast	Role	Description
Claire Yiu	Ma Cheuk Yee-tak 馬卓爾德	Ma Ching's wife Lai Muk-kan's boss Threatened Lai Muk-kan; Sentenced to life in Episode 4 (Villain)
Chan Wing-chun	Lai Muk-kan 黎木根	Ma Cheuk Yee-tak's driver Threatened by Ma Cheuk Yee-tak; Killed Sheung Chau-ping; Sentenced to 7-years in jail in Episode 4
Geoffrey Wong	Ma Ching 馬澄	Ma Cheuk Yee-tak's husband Sheung Chau-ping's boss and lover
Jeanette Leung	Sheung Chau-ping 常秋萍	Sheung Chun-shang's sister Ma Ching's subordinate and mistress Killed by Lai Muk-kan in Episode 2
Cheng Ka-chun	Sheung Chun-shang 常春生	Sheung Chau-ping's brother

==== Fuk Yuen Restaurant theft (Episode 5 - 6) ====
Cast	Role	Description
Chun Wong	Ting Fuk-yuen 丁福元	Fuk Yuen Restaurant owner Tai-Ng Ting's ex-employer Ting Ka-fu's father Sued Tai-Ng Ting for stealing money
Joyce Tang	Tai-Ng Ting 第五婷	Ting Fuk-yuen's ex-employee Refuted Ting Fuk-yuen forcing her to buy and promote mooncake coupons Acquittal and released in Episode 6
Sam Lee	Ting Ka-fu 丁家富	Ting Fuk-yuen's son Accused Ting Fuk-yuen of exploiting employees

==== Yam Yuen-yuen murder (Episode 8 - 11) ====
Cast	Role	Description
Savio Tsang	Yam Ho-tin 任灝天	Wong Mei-fun's husband Yam Yuen-yuen's father Ko Wing-leung's stepfather
Poon Fong-fong	Wong Mei-fun 黃美芬	Yam Ho-tin's wife Ko Wing-leung's mother Yam Yuen-yuen's stepmother
Stephen Wong	Ko Wing-leung 高永良	A car repair technician Wong Mei-fun's son Yam Ho-tin's stepson Yam Yuen-yuen's stepbrother Law Lik-a's friend Yam Yuen-yuen's love interest Acquittal and released in Episode 11
Katy Kung	Yam Yuen-yuen 任圓圓	Yam Ho-tin's daughter Wong Mei-fun's stepdaughter Ko Wing-leung's stepsister Chow Ka-ho's girlfriend Loved Ko Wing-leung; Killed by accident in Episode 8
Yeung Ching-wah	Chow Ka-ho, Howard 周家豪	Yam Yuen-yuen's boyfriend

==== Miu Yeuk Lai murder (Episode 12 - 15) ====
Cast	Role	Description
Jess Shum	Miu Yeuk Lai, Coco 苗若麗	Aunt Yim's granddaughter Yeung Kwok Kui's wife Wai Chai's mother Mike Bo's tenant and mistress Killed by Yeung Kwok Kui in Episode 12
Samuel Kwok	Mai Bo 米布	Mai George's father Law Lik-ah's uncle Miu Yeuk Lai's landlord and lover
Lee Fung	Aunt Yim 嚴婆婆	Miu Yeuk Lai's grandmother
Dexter Young	Yeung Kwok Kui 楊國駒	Miu Yeuk Lai's husband Wai Chai's father Guilty of manslaughter in Episode 15 (Villain)
Agassi Cheng	Wai Chai 偉仔	Yeung Kwok Kui and Miu Yeuk Lai's son

==== Tai-Ng Ting wounding assault (Episode 17) ====
Cast	Role	Description
Ngai Wai-man	Leung Fung 梁風	Tai-Ng Ting's husband Claimed to be wounded by Tai-Ng Ting; Threatened Tai-Ng Ting and Mai George; Charged by police for intentional injury and perverting the course of justice in Episode 17 (Villain)
Joyce Tang	Tai-Ng Ting 第五婷	Leung Fung's wife Acquittal and released in Episode 17

==== Wong Tsz-kin murder (Episode 18 - 19) ====
Cast	Role	Description
Brian Wong	Wong Tsz-kin 黃子健	A triad member Beaten to death by in Episode 18
Otto Chan	Ho Tai-keung 何大強	Ho Yau-fuk's son the first defendant With criminal record Plead guilty in Episode 19
Lau Tin-lung	Yau Man-lai 邱文禮	the second defendant University student
Ho Kwan-shing	Law Bing-hei 羅秉晞	the third defendant University student
Cheng Tsz-yeung	Yan Chau 殷宙	the fourth defendant University student
Cheng Wing-him	Yan Yu 殷宇	the fifth defendant University student
Cheng Ka-sang	Ho Yau-fuk 何有福	A drug trafficker Ho Tai-keung's father Bribed by Cheung Pak-kei to force Ho Tai-keung to plead guilty

==== Ho Lee-ching murder (Episode 19 - 20) ====
Cast	Role	Description
Shek Sau	Cheung Pak-kei, Spencer 蔣柏奇	A barrister Ching Pok-him's supervisor Killed Ho Lee-ching in Episode 19; Guilty of manslaughter and sentenced to 20-year jail in Episode 20 (Main Villain)
Sharon Chan	Ho Lee-ching 何利貞	A prostitute Wong Si-fu's friend Ting Ka-fu's girlfriend But Chik's love interest Killed by Cheung Pak-kei in Episode 19

=== Others ===
Cast	Role	Description
Eddie Kwan	But Chik 畢直	A policeman So Shan's boyfriend Ting Ka-fu's friend Loved Ho Lee-ching
Stephen Huynh	Ching Pok-him, Victor 程博謙	A barrister Cheung Pak-kei's subordinate
Mandy Wong	Cheung Chi-sum, Silvia 張芷芯	A solicitor Wong Si-fu's assistant
Joe Junior	Ma Tik-lun 馬迪倫	A barrister Wong Si-fu's supervisor
Catherine Chau	So Shan 蘇珊	But Chik's girlfriend

== Awards and nominations ==
=== 43rd Ming Pao Anniversary Awards 2011 ===
- Nominated: Outstanding Programme
- Nominated: Outstanding Actor in Television (Kevin Cheng)
- Nominated: Outstanding Actress in Television (Myolie Wu)
- Nominated: Outstanding Crew in Television (Tong Kei Ming)

=== 45th TVB Anniversary Awards 2011 ===
- Won: Best Actor (Kevin Cheng)
- Won: Best Supporting Actress (Sharon Chan)
- Won: My Favourite Male Character (Kevin Cheng)
- Won: My Favourite Female Character (Myolie Wu)
- Nominated: Best Drama - Top 5
- Nominated: Best Supporting Actor (Sam Lee)
- Nominated: Best Supporting Actor (Alex Lam) - Top 5
- Nominated: Best Supporting Actress (Joyce Tang)
- Nominated: My Favourite Female Character (Sharon Chan)
- Nominated: Most Improved Male Artiste (Alex Lam) - Top 5
- Nominated: Most Improved Female Artiste (Mandy Wong) - Top 5
- Nominated: Most Improved Female Artiste (Katy Kung) - Top 5

=== My Astro on Demand Favourites Awards 2011 ===
- Won: My Favourite Drama
- Won: My Favourite Actor (Kevin Cheng)
- Won: My Favourite Supporting Actress (Sharon Chan)
- Won: My Favourite Television Character (Kevin Cheng)
- Nominated: My Favourite Supporting Actor (Alex Lam) - Top 5
- Nominated: My Favourite On-screen Couple (Kevin Cheng & Myolie Wu) - Top 5
- Nominated: My Favourite Potential Actor (Alex Lam) - Top 5
- Nominated: My Favourite Potential Actress (Sharon Chan) - Top 5
- Nominated: My Favourite Theme Song (Hanjin Tan & Jin Au-yeung) - Top 5

== Viewership ratings ==
	Week	Episodes	Average Points	Peaking Points	References
1	May 30 - June 3, 2011	1 — 5	28	—	
2	June 6–10, 2011	6 — 10	30	33	
3	June 13–17, 2011	11 — 15	29	31	
4	June 20–24, 2011	16 — 20	31	35	
