= Love Undercover (film) =

2002 Hong Kong film by Joe Ma

- Film poster
- 新紮師妹
- Directed by: Joe Ma
- Written by: Joe Ma; Sunny Chan
- Produced by: Ivy Kong
- Starring: Miriam Yeung; Daniel Wu
- Cinematography: Cheung Man Po
- Edited by: Cheung Ka-fai
- Music by: Lincoln Lo Kin
- Release date: 7 March 2002
- Running time: 103 minutes
- Country: Hong Kong
- Language: Cantonese
- Box office: HK$11.8 million

Love Undercover (新紮師妹) is a 2002 Hong Kong film directed by Joe Ma Wai-Ho.

The film was followed by two sequels, also directed by Joe Ma: Love Undercover 2: Love Mission (2003) and Love Undercover 3 (2006).

== Cast ==
- Miriam Yeung - Fong Lai Kuen
- Daniel Wu - Au Hoi Man
- Benz Hui - Officer Chung
- Wyman Wong - Roger
- Sammy Leung - Over
- Cha Siu-Yan - Madame Cha
- Chow Chung - Au Yiu San
- Matt Chow
- Joe Lee Yiu-ming - Chuen
- Lee Siu-kei - FBI officer
- Alan Mak
- Ng Chi Hung - FBI officer
- Wong Ho-Yin - Hung Chow
- Wong Yat Tung
- Wilson Yip
