= Mongkok Story =

1996 Hong Kong film by Wilson Yip

- DVD cover
- 旺角風雲; Wong Gok fung wan
- Directed by: Wilson Yip
- Written by: Kwok Wai Chung
- Produced by: Wong Siu-Ming
- Starring: Edmond Leung; Anthony Wong; Roy Cheung
- Cinematography: Patrick Jim; Thomas Yeung; Chiu Foo-Keung
- Edited by: Yiu Tin-Hung
- Music by: Tommy Wai Kai Leung
- Production companies: Hang Ngai Films Co., Ltd.
- Release date: 7 September 1996 (Hong Kong)
- Running time: 96 minutes
- Country: Hong Kong
- Language: Cantonese

Mongkok Story (Chinese: 旺角風雲; pinyin: Wong Gok fung wan) is a 1996 Hong Kong action crime film directed by Wilson Yip.

== Plot ==
Members of the Fook Sung gang go out to drink together with the waiter Leung from their regular restaurant who likes to listen to their stories about triad life. They accidentally offend members of the Lo Fung gang by talking to their girlfriends and end up in a fight in which Leung-ping's hand is injured. At a meeting to resolve the matter, the Fook Sung gang's leader Long Ching attends and calmly resolves the situation without violence. Leung-ping is welcomed into the gang and discovers that Ching's pregnant wife is Chu May-yee, his childhood crush.

Bisexual actor and rival gang leader Lui Lone learns that Fook Sung gang member Peter has been spreading rumors that he has herpes, but when they jump the gang in revenge they kidnap Leung-ping instead of Peter. Lui Lone forces Leung-ping to perform oral sex on him to prove that he is free of disease. Leung-ping asks Ching for help but Ching attempts to resolve it peacefully, angering Leung-ping. Peter leads him and the others to desecrate Lui Lone's father's grave, angering the peace-loving Ching, who gives Lui Lone money to improve his father's grave site. Lui Lone calls off a planned attack on Ching, but Ching overhears and angrily breaks Lui Lone's father's urn, causing a furious fight between the gangs. During the fight Lui Lone shoots Ching and the other gang members chop him up.

Ching's funeral is sparsely attended, but Lui Lone attends in disguise. He is recognized and a fight almost breaks out but May-yee tells them that she is sick of the fighting. Lui Lone offers to take care of her and her child, but she refuses. The Fook Sung gang later attacks Lui Lone while he is filming a movie scene on a public street and Leung-ping chases Lui Lone into an alley, where the two are jumped by robbers who take their money and phones and tie them together. Lui Lone gets free and attempts to force Leung-ping to give him oral sex again, but when Leung-ping spits on him Lui Lone is angered and threatens to cut Leung-ping's mouth open. At that moment Lui Lone is stabbed in the back by one of the robbers who is angry that Lui Lone gave him the wrong code for his stolen phone. Lui Lone begs Leung-ping to call the police but dies before Leung-ping can dial for help.

== Cast ==
- Chan Man-Fai
- Chan San-Pang
- Michael Chan - Fook
- Cheng Bo-Sui
- Roy Cheung - Long Ching
- Chin Wing-Wai
- Choi Hiu-Yee
- Kwok Wai Chung
- Edmond Leung - Leung-ping
- Leung Kam-Sam
- Leung Wing-Lam
- Lok Tat-Wah
- Man Sing
- Anthony Wong - Lui Lone
- Wong Woh-Hing

== Awards ==
- 1996 Hong Kong Film Critics Society Award: Best Screenplay and Film of Merit

== See also ==
- Mong Kok
