= Ghetto Justice II =

Hong Kong television series

- Promotional poster
- 怒火街頭2
- Genre: Legal drama Comedy
- Created by: Terry Tong
- Starring: Kevin Cheng; Myolie Wu; Sam Lee; JJ Jia; Alex Lam; Raymond Cho; Christine Kuo; Crystal Li; Elena Kong
- Country of origin: Hong Kong
- Original language: Cantonese
- No. of episodes: 21

Production
- Producers: Tommy Leung; Joe Chan
- Camera setup: Multi-camera
- Production company: TVB

Original release
- Network: TVB Jade
- Release: 31 July – 25 August 2012

Related
- Ghetto Justice (2011)

Ghetto Justice II
- Traditional Chinese: 怒火街頭2
- Simplified Chinese: 怒火街头2
- Literal meaning: "Fury Street Corner 2"
Transcriptions
Standard Mandarin
- Hanyu Pinyin: Nù Huǒ Jiē Tōu Èr
- Wade–Giles: Nu^{4} Huo^{3} Chieh^{1} T'ou^{1} Erh^{4}
Yue: Cantonese
- Jyutping: Nou6 Fo2 Gaai1 Tau4 Ji6

Ghetto Justice II is a Hong Kong modern drama series produced by TVB. It is a sequel to the 2011 hit series Ghetto Justice. This sequel features original cast members Kevin Cheng, Myolie Wu, Sam Lee and Alex Lam with the addition of new cast members JJ Jia, Raymond Cho, Christine Kuo, Crystal Li and Elena Kong. Joyce Tang (who played as Tai-Ng Ting) and Eddie Kwan (played as But Chik) didn't reprise their roles in the sequel and was excused off in the series.

== Plot ==
A year and half has passed since the events of Ghetto Justice; Law Lik-ah (a.k.a. LA Law) is released from jail and restarts life back in Sham Shui Po. Certain friends have come and left, but the people of the district still suffer from injustice and both LA and Kris (Myolie Wu) find means to seek justice for the locals.

== Cast ==
=== Main cast ===
| Cast | Role | Description |
|---|---|---|
| Kevin Cheng | Law Lik Ah (L.A) 羅力亞 | Barrister; Kris Wong's boyfriend George Mike's older cousin Ting Ka Fu's good friend |
| Sam Lee | Ting Ka Fu 丁家富 | A social worker and legal advice centre owner LA and George Mike's good friend |
| Alex Lam (林子善) | George Mike, Jr. (MJ) 米佐治 | Solicitor; LA's younger cousin Ting Ka Fu's good friend Pursues Grace Ko |
| JJ Jia | Chin Sum Sum 錢心心 | Foot masseuse Immigrant from Sichuan, China; Loves Ting Ka Fu |
| Raymond Cho | Leung Pau Shing 梁包升 | Police sergeant Pursues Grace Ko |

=== The Wong family ===
| Cast | Role | Description |
|---|---|---|
| Rainbow Ching (程可為) | Poon Siu King 潘小瓊 | "King Tin Cart Noodle" noodle restaurant owner Wong Sze Fu, Wong Yik Tim and Wong Sze Yuen's mother |
| Myolie Wu | Wong Sze Fu (Kris) 王思苦 | Barrister; LA's girlfriend Poon Siu King's elder daughter Wong Yik Tim and Wong Sze Yuen's older sister |
| Destiny Cheng (鄭瑩瑩) | Wong Yik Tim 王憶甜 | Poon Siu King's younger daughter Wong Sze Fu's younger sister Wong Sze Yuen's older sister |
| Choi Lik Yiu (蔡曜力) | Wong Sze Yuen 王思源 | Poon Siu King's younger son Wong Sze Fu and Wong Yik Tim's younger brother |

=== The Ting family ===
| Cast | Role | Description |
|---|---|---|
| Chun Wong (秦煌) | Ting Fuk Yuen 丁福元 | "Fuk Yuen Restaurant" owner Tam Wing Chau's husband Ting Ka Fu's father |
| Ting Chu Wai (丁主惠) | Tam Wing Chau 譚詠秋 | Ting Fuk Yuen's wife Ting Ka Fu's mother Deceased in ep. 18 |
| Sam Lee | Ting Ka Fu 丁家富 | A social worker and legal advice centre owner Ho Lei Ching's ex-boyfriend Chin Sam Sam's boyfriend Wai Chun Nei's love interest |

=== Other cast ===
| Cast | Role | Description |
|---|---|---|
| Christine Kuo | King Ling Lei (Lynette) 景伶俐 | Doctor; LA's ex-wife King Sing Wong's daughter |
| Crystal Li | Ko Nga (Grace) 高雅 | George Mike and Leung Pau Shing's love interest |
| Elena Kong (江美儀) | Wai Tsan-nei | Barrister |
| Stephen Huynh | Ching Pok Him (Victor) 程博謙 | Barrister; Kris Wong's admirer King Sing Wong's subordinate |
| Cheung Kwok Keung (張國強) | King Sing Wong 景成皇 | Barrister; Chan Yik Fan's lover Lynette's father |
| Whitney Hui (許亦妮) | Chan Yik Fan 陳亦芬 | Tse Lung's lover |
| Mak Cheung-ching | Tai Chiu Lung 戴超龍 | A ruthless property developer Main Villain; Smacked and killed by LA, with a golf club in episode 21. |
| Celine Ma (馬蹄露) | Beauty | Lynette's good friend |
| Eliza Sam (岑麗香) | Bo Bo | |
| Paisley Hu | Nancy | |
| King Kong (金剛) | Chok Man | Lynette's admirer |
| Alice Fung So-bor | | |
| Patrick Dunn (鄧梓峰) | | |
| Ho Chun Hin (何俊軒) | Fai 輝 | Uniformed officer |
| Daniel Kwok (郭卓樺) | | Uniformed officer |
| Tong Chun Ming (湯俊明) | | Uniformed officer |
| Henry Lee | | |
| Timothy Cheng (鄭子誠) | | |
| Gogo Cheung (張韋怡) | Mei 美 | Legal advice centre worker |
| Dia Yiu Ming (戴耀明) | | Landlord Cheung 業主張 |
| Daniel Chau (周志康) | Tai Chi-Chin 戴子千 | Son of Tai Chiu Lung. He ran business in order to satisfy his father's desire. After realizing his own desires, he decided to pursue his own dreams and disowns his father since episode 14. |

== Production ==
Filming began on 6 October where a costume fitting and blessing ceremony was held at Studio One Parking Lot of the TVB City in Tseung Kwan O, Hong Kong at 12:30PM.

== Viewership ratings ==
The following is a table that includes a list of the total ratings points based on television viewership.

| Week | Originally Aired | Episodes | Average Points | Peaking Points | References |
|---|---|---|---|---|---|
| 1 | 30 July - 3 August 2012 | 1 — 5 | 28 | — | |
| 2 | 6–10 August 2012 | 6 — 10 | 28 | — | |
| 3 | 13–17 August 2012 | 11 — 15 | 32 | | |
| 4 | 20–24 August 2012 | 16 — 19 | 31 | 34 | |
| 4 | 25 August 2012 | 20 — 21 | 29 | 32 | |
