= Kevin Cheng =

- 鄭嘉穎
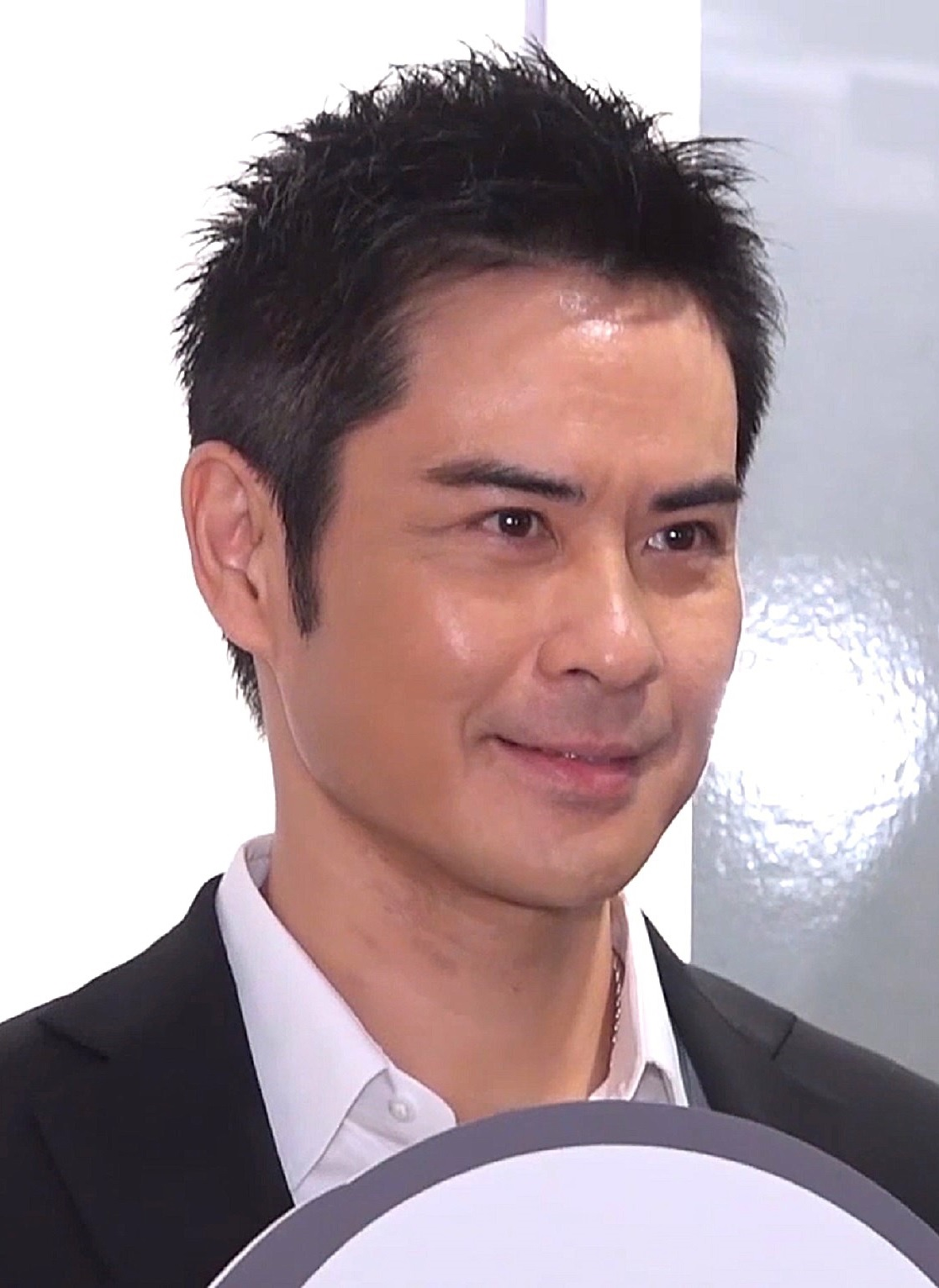
- Cheng in 2019
- Born: 15 August 1969 (age 57); San Francisco, California, United States
- Occupations: Actor, singer
- Years active: 1993–present
- Spouse: Grace Chan (m. 2018)
- Children: 3
- Awards: My Astro On Demands Awards; Best Actor; 2011 Ghetto Justice; My Top 15 Favourite Characters; 2011 Ghetto JusticeTVB Anniversary Awards –; Best Lead Actor; 2006 Under the Canopy of Love; 2011 Ghetto Justice; My Favorite Male Character; 2011 Ghetto Justice; tvb.com Microblog's Popularity Award; 2011 Asian Television Awards –; Best Actor in a Leading Role; 2011 Ghetto Justice
- Musical career
- Origin: Hong Kong
- Genres: Cantopop
- Instrument: Vocals
- Labels: PolyGram; UMG

Chinese name
- Traditional Chinese: 鄭嘉穎
- Simplified Chinese: 郑嘉颖
Transcriptions
Standard Mandarin
- Hanyu Pinyin: Zhèng Jiāyǐng
Yue: Cantonese
- Jyutping: zeng6 gaa1 wing6
- Website: www.kevincheng.com.hk; Official TVB Blog

Kevin Cheng (Chinese: 鄭嘉穎, born 15 August 1969) is a Hong Kong American actor and singer. Cheng rose to fame for his first lead role in the TVB drama Hard Fate (2004). His other notable works include Ghetto Justice (2011) and Scarlet Heart (2011).

== Early life ==
Cheng was born in San Francisco, California, but spent most of his childhood in Hong Kong. He attended Pun U Association Wah Yah Primary School, Wah Yan College, the Hong Kong International School, and Alhambra High School in the United States. During his school days, his mother sent him back to China, where he lived with his uncle for two years before returning to Hong Kong after his mother changed her mind about migrating to the United States. He completed his high school education in Canada. He pursued a civil engineering degree at the California State University in Los Angeles, but did not finish his studies because his father died and he wanted to move back to Hong Kong to be with his mother.

== Career ==
=== 1993–2005 ===
When Cheng was 16 years old, he participated in a singing contest organised by the Hong Kong television network TVB but dropped out halfway because he felt that he was not ready to be a singer at that time. Later, after he moved back to Hong Kong in his early 20s, he decided to continue his pursuit of a singing career. He signed a contract with the record label PolyGram in 1993 and released his first album in the same year to mixed reviews. He was seen as a newcomer with good potential and managed to win several Best New Artist awards in 1994. Cheng's manager later helped him launch his career in the Taiwanese entertainment industry.

Cheng was noticed by Mediacorp after he portrayed the villain "Jiang Yulang" in the 1999 Taiwanese television series The Legendary Siblings. He returned to Hong Kong and signed a management contract with TVB in the following year and started playing minor roles in some television series produced by the network. In 2004, he played a leading role for the first time in the TVB drama Hard Fate.

=== 2006–2010 ===
Cheng soared to popularity after portraying "Alan Shum" in the 2006 romantic drama Under the Canopy of Love, for which he also won the TVB Anniversary Award for Best Actor that year. His singing career also gradually improved after the Taiwanese musician Liu Chia-chang composed a single, "Helpless" (無可奈何), for him. In the same year, he also released a Cantonese compilations album and held his very first mini concert.

Cheng had another critical breakthrough role in the 2007 crime drama The Ultimate Crime Fighter, in which he played the villain "Aaren Chong" and earned glowing reviews for his performance. In the 2008 thriller-suspense drama Last One Standing, his portrayal of the ex-convict "Sing Hei" earned him further critical acclaim and widespread praise from viewers. He was also one of the top five nominees for the TVB Anniversary Award for Best Actor in 2008, but the award went to the veteran TVB actor Ha Yu.

=== 2011-present ===
In 2011, Cheng clinched the "Best Actor" award for his role in the legal drama Ghetto Justice at the 16th Asian Television Awards (ATA) as well as winning the Best Actor award at the 2011 TVB Anniversary Award.

In 2016, Cheng starred in the drama Blue Veins, in which he played the role of undead human and vampire hunter, Ying Wut-zoek, who had been given super powered immortals during 500 years ago.

In 2021, Cheng starred in the medical drama Kid's Lives Matter, for which he is placed among the top 5 nominees for the Best Actor at the 2021 TVB Anniversary Award.

== Personal life ==
On 12 August 2018, Cheng married his girlfriend of three years, actress and Miss Hong Kong 2013 Grace Chan, in Bali, Indonesia. The couple have three sons born in 2019, 2020 and 2023.

== Filmography ==
=== Films ===
Year	Title	Role	Notes
1993	The Tigers – The Legend of Canton 廣東五虎之鐵拳無敵孫中山	Rickshaw Puller	
1995	Hong Kong Graffiti 香江花月夜	Kelvin Cheung	
1996	Boy's? 假男假女	Jaffee	
2001	Fing's Raver; Fing頭K王之王		
2003	Twilight Tubes Part III 不可思議星期二(第三輯)		
2004	Instant Marriage 新婚告急		
2007	Super Fans 甜心粉絲王	Yee-cheng	
2007	Wonder Women 女人．本色	Dr Yim Hok-fung	
2010	72 Tenants of Prosperity 七十二家房客	Firefighter	guest star
2011	The Woman Knight of Mirror Lake 競雄女俠秋瑾	Wang Tingjun	
2013	Ip Man: The Final Fight 葉問-終極一戰	Ip Man (young)	
2013	Badges of Fury 不二神探	Lee Tin-chi	cameo
2016	Poor Rich Dad		
2018	Super App		
2018	Lucid Dreams		
2018	L Storm	Ching Tak-ming	
2018	Master Z: The Ip Man Legacy 叶问外传：张天志	Tso Sai Kit	
2019	P Storm	Ching Tak-ming	
2019	The Invincible Dragon	Tso	
2021	G Storm; G風暴	Ching Tak-ming	
2022	Burning 焚身		

=== Television dramas ===
Year	Title	Role	Network	Awards / nominations	Notes
1994	Mind Your Own Business 開心華之里	Lee Sheung-Jun	TVB		cameo
1999	The Legendary Siblings 絕代雙驕	Jiang Yulang	TTV		
2000	Legend of Heaven and Earth: Mermaid				
2001	Shaolin Seven Sets				
2002	Network Love Story 一網情深	Luk Nai-shing	TVB / CCTV		
2002	Burning Flame II 烈火雄心II	Mark Kei Hing-tin	TVB		
2002	Slim Chances 我要Fit一Fit	Sean Sze	TVB		
2003	The Threat of Love 2 LovingYou我愛你2	Shek Man-kit, Yeung Chi-kwong, Ho Jai, Chung Jai, Cheung Ho-chu, Sam, Lui Bong, Ho Kam-tim	TVB		
2003	Better Halves 金牌冰人	Yip Chi-chau	TVB		
2003	Not Just A Pretty Face 美麗在望	Wilson Fok	TVB		
2003	Point of No Return 西關大少	Chan Kai-tong	TVB		
2003	Life Begins at Forty 花樣中年	Ken Ying	TVB		
2004	Hard Fate 翡翠戀曲	Ken Leung Ka-ming	TVB	Astro Drama Awards for My Favourite Character; Nominated – TVB Anniversary Awards for My Favourite Male Character	
2004	Split Second 爭分奪秒	Vincent Wong Ka-fai	TVB		
2005	Yummy Yummy	Chan Kar-lok	TVB	Astro Drama Awards for My Favourite Character	
2006	Under the Canopy of Love 天幕下的戀人	Alan Shum Long	TVB	TVB Anniversary Award for Best Actor; Astro Drama Awards for My Favourite Character; Astro Drama Awards for My Favourite Couple (shared with Niki Chow); Nominated – TVB Anniversary Award for My Favourite Male Character (Top 5); Nominated – TVB Anniversary Award for Most Improved Male Artiste (Top 5)	
2006	Trimming Success 飛短留長父子兵	Jason Fan Tin-long	TVB	Nominated – TVB Anniversary Award for Most Improved Male Artiste (Top 5)	
2006	Placebo Cure 心理心裏有個謎	Joe Cheung	TVB		2004 warehoused drama
2007	Life Art 寫意人生	Ryan Fong	TVB		
2007	Devil's Disciples 強劍	King Lui	TVB	Nominated – TVB Anniversary Awards for Best Actor (Top 20)	2006 Warehoused drama
2007	The Ultimate Crime Fighter 通天幹探	Aaron Chong Man-hei	TVB	Nominated – TVB Anniversary Awards for My Favourite Male Character (Top 24)	
2008	The Seventh Day 最美麗的第七天	Wayne Yau Chi-wing	TVB		
2008	Forensic Heroes II 法證先鋒II	Ivan Yeung Yat-sing	TVB		
2008	Last One Standing 與敵同行	Cheung Sing-hei	TVB	Nominated – TVB Anniversary Award for Best Actor (Top 5); Nominated – TVB Anniversary Award for My Favourite Male Character (Top 10)	
2009	Burning Flame III 烈火雄心3	Rex Cheuk Pak-yu	TVB	Nominated – TVB Anniversary Award for Best Actor (Top 15)	
2009	Beyond the Realm of Conscience 宮心計	Ko Hin-yeung	TVB	Nominated – TVB Anniversary Award for My Favourite Male Character (Top 5)	
2010	A Fistful of Stances 鐵馬尋橋	Ku Kin-shing / Ku Yu-cheung	TVB	Nominated – TVB Anniversary Award for Best Actor (Top 15)	
2010-2011	Home Troopers 居家兵團	Joseph Chukot Ching	TVB		
2011	Only You 只有您	Summer Ha Tin-sang	TVB		
2011	Ghetto Justice 怒火街頭	LA Law Lik-ah (Law Ba)	TVB	Asian Television Award for Best Actor in a Leading Role; TVB Anniversary Award for Best Actor; TVB Anniversary Award for My Favourite Male Character; My Astro on Demand Awards for Best Actor; My Astro on Demand Awards for My Top 15 Favourite Characters	
2011	Scarlet Heart 步步驚心	Yinsi, the Eighth Imperial Prince	HBS		
2012	Mystery in the Palace 深宮諜影	Getai			
2012	Gloves Come Off 拳王	Tong Sap Yat	TVB	Nominated – TVB Anniversary Award for Best Actor (Top 10)	
2012	Ghetto Justice II 怒火街頭2	LA Law Lik-ah (Law Ba)	TVB	Nominated – TVB Anniversary Award for My Favourite Male Character (Top 10)	
2012	Hero 英雄	King Fuchai of Wu	CTS		
2013	Ip Man 葉問	Ye Wen	Suzhou Funa Films and Television		
2015	Eye in the Sky 天眼	Szeto Shun	TVB		
2016	Blue Veins 殭	Ying Wuet Tseuk	TVB		
2017	Destination Nowhere 迷	Man Kiu-Pak	TVB		
2017	Taichi 太极宗师之太极门		PPTV		
2021	Kids' Lives Matter 星空下的仁醫	Dr. Hui Kam-fung	TVB	Nominated – TVB Anniversary Award for Best Actor (Top 5); Nominated – TVB Anniversary Award for Most Popular Male Character (Top 10); Nominated – TVB Anniversary Award for Most Popular Onscreen Partnership (Top 5, with Linda Chung); Nominated – TVB Anniversary Award for Favourite TVB Actor in Malaysia (Top 5); Nominated – People's Choice Television Award for Best Actor (Top 10); Nominated – People's Choice Television Award for Best TV Drama Partnership (Top 10, with Kenneth Ma and Linda Chung); Nominated – People's Choice Television Award for Best TV Drama Partnership (Top 10, with Linda Chung)	

== Discography ==
=== Albums ===
Year	Album title	Notes
1993	Kevin 鄭嘉穎	Self-titled Debut Album
1994	全因身邊有	
2006	Kevin 鄭嘉穎新曲加精選	Compilation + New Songs
2013	說來話長	Mandarin Album

=== TVB drama songs ===
Year	Song title	Drama	Notes
2005	與朋友共 (With Friends)	Yummy Yummy	duet with Raymond Lam
2005	三角兩面 (Three Corners With Two Sides)	Yummy Yummy	
2006	愛平凡 (Love Ordinary)	Trimming Success	
2006	請講 (Please Say)	Under the Canopy of Love	duet with Niki Chow
2007	活得寫意 (Live an Enjoyable Life)	Life Art	
2007	強劍 (Sacred Sword)	Devil's Disciples	duet with Bosco Wong
2008	最美麗的第七天 (The Most Beautiful Seventh Day)	The Seventh Day	
2008	抱著空氣 (Embracing the Air)	The Seventh Day	duet with Niki Chow
2009	有意 (Intentions)	Burning Flame III	duet with Myolie Wu
2010	雪下思 (Thinking Under Snow)	A Fistful of Stances	
2012	一擊即中 (One-Shot Hit)	Gloves Come Off	

=== Others ===
Year	Song title	Notes
2006	Put Your Hands Up	2006 World Cup Theme, performed with Raymond Lam, Ron Ng and Bosco Wong

== Awards ==
=== TVB Anniversary Awards ===
Won

Year	Award	Performance	Notes
2006	Best Actor in a Leading Role	"Alan Shum Long" in Under the Canopy of Love	
2011	Best Actor in a Leading Role	"Law Lik-ah" in Ghetto Justice	
2011	My Favourite Male Character	"Law Lik-ah" in Ghetto Justice	
2011	TVB.COM Popularity Award		

Nominated

Year	Nomination	Performance	Notes
2004	My Favourite Male Character	"Kent Leung Ka-Ming" in Hard Fate	
2006	Best Actor in a Leading Role	"Alan Shum Long" in Under the Canopy of Love	
2006	My Favourite Male Character	"Alan Shum Long" in Under the Canopy of Love	
2006	Most Improved Actor Nomination		
2007	Best Actor in a Leading Role	"Ging Lui" in Devil's Disciples	
2007	My Favourite Male Character	"Aaren Ching Man-Hei" in The Ultimate Crime Fighter	
2008	Best Actor in a Leading Role	"Cheung Sing-Hei" in Last One Standing	
2008	My Favourite Male Character	"Cheung Sing-Hei" in Last One Standing	
2008	Most Fashionable Charming Artist		
2009	Best Actor in a Leading Role	"Rex Cheuk Pak-Yu" in Burning Flames III	
2009	My Favourite Male Character	"Ko Hing-Yeung" in Beyond the Realm of Conscience	
2011	My Favourite Male Character	"Law Lik-ah" in Ghetto Justice	
2011	Best Actor in a Leading Role	"Law Lik-ah" in Ghetto Justice	
2011	TVB.COM Popularity Award		

=== Others ===
Year	Award	Notes
1994	Metro Radio Golden Song Awards – Best New Artist	
1994	TVB Jade Solid Gold Music Awards – Most Popular Newcomer (silver)	
1994	RTHK Top 10 Chinese Song Awards – Most Promising Newcomer (bronze)	
1994	Commercial Radio Music Awards – Best New Artist (gold)	
2003	Men's Uno – Stylish Actor	
2004	Hong Kong Designer Awards – Top 10 Best Dressed People	
2005	Malaysia Astro Wah Lai Toi Awards – Favourite Character (Leung Ka-ming in Hard Fate)	
2006	TVB Magazine Popularity Awards – Top 10 Most Popular TV Character (Alan in Under the Canopy of Love)	
2006	TVB Magazine Popularity Awards – Most Popular Magazine Cover (with Niki Chow)	
2006	Jessica Magazine – Extraordinary Charm	
2006	TVB Children Song Awards – Top 10 Children Songs & Children Songs Gold Award for Keroro (军曹)	
2006	TVB Jade Solid Gold Best Songs Round 2 – Most Popular Mandarin Song for Helpless (無可奈何)	
2006	TVB8 Gold Songs 2006 4th Quarter Selections – Gold Song for Helpless (無可奈何)	
2006	TVB 39th Anniversary Awards – Best Actor in a Leading Role (Alan in Under the Canopy of Love)	
2007	Malaysia Astro Wah Lai Toi Awards – Favourite Character (Chan Ka-lok in Yummy Yummy)	
2007	Hong Kong Media Top 10 Artist Awards – 4th Place	
2007	Hong Kong Media Top 10 TV Program Awards – 9th Place (Under the Canopy of Love)	
2008	Malaysia Astro Wah Lai Toi Awards – Favourite Character (Alan in Under the Canopy of Love)	
2008	Malaysia Astro Wah Lai Toi Awards – Favourite Theme Song (請講 from Under the Canopy of Love)	
2008	Malaysia Astro Wah Lai Toi Awards – Favourite On-Screen Couple (Kevin Cheng and Niki Chow)	
2011	My Astro on Demand Awards – Best Actor (Ghetto Justice)	
2011	My Astro on Demand Awards – My Top 15 Favourite Characters (Law Lik-ah in Ghetto Justice)	
2011	Asian Television Awards 2011 – Best Actor in a Leading Role (Law Lik-ah in Ghetto Justice)	
2011	Beijing's TV Drama Awards Made in China 2011 – Most Popular Network Actor of the Year Award (Ghetto Justice)	

Awards and achievements
TVB Anniversary Awards
Preceded by Roger Kwok for Life Made Simple	Best Actor; 2006 for Under the Canopy of Love	Succeeded by Moses Chan for Heart of Greed
Preceded by Wayne Lai for No Regrets	Best Actor; 2011 for Ghetto Justice	Succeeded by Wayne Lai for The Confidant
Preceded by Raymond Lam for The Mysteries of Love	My Favourite Male Character; 2011 for Ghetto Justice	Succeeded by Kenneth Ma for The Hippocratic Crush
Preceded by Raymond Lam	TVB.com Popular Artist; 2011	Succeeded by Incumbent
Asian Television Awards
Preceded by Bowie Lam for Sister of Pearl	Best Actor in a Leading Role; 2011 for Ghetto Justice	Succeeded by Moses Chan for When Heaven Burns
My AOD Favourites Awards
Preceded by Moses Chan for Can't Buy Me Love	My Favourite TV Actor; 2011 for Ghetto Justice	Succeeded by Kenneth Ma for The Hippocratic Crush
