= Joe Lee (actor) =

Hong Kong actor

Joe Lee Yiu-ming (李耀明) (1956–2003) was a Hong Kong actor. He was sometimes credited as Joe Li.

== Filmography ==
- The Mummy, Aged 19 (2002)
- Devil Face, Angel Heart (2002)
- Love Undercover (2002)
- The Lion Roars (2002)
- Tung gui mat yau (2001)
- Runaway (2001)
- Lao fu zi (2001)
- Chung chong ging chaat (2001) (as Joe Li)
- Sui jeuk fun ji (2001) (as Joe Li)
- Faat gwong sek tau (2000)
- Gau geung ying ging (2000)
- Jue lai yip yue leung saan ang
- Victim (1999)
- Baau lit ying ging (1999)
- Ban siu haai (1999)
- Dut gwat lung yue chin nin chung (1999)
