= Hard Fate =

Chinese television series

- Official poster
- 翡翠戀曲
- Genre: Modern Drama
- Starring: Flora Chan; Damian Lau; Kevin Cheng; Niki Chow
- Country of origin: Hong Kong
- Original language: Cantonese
- No. of episodes: 30

Production
- Producer: Amy Wong
- Running time: 45 minutes (approx.)

Original release
- Network: TVB
- Release: April 12 – May 21, 2004

Related
- Armed Reaction IV; Angels of Mission

Hard Fate (Traditional Chinese - 翡翠戀曲) is a 30-episode melodrama series which aired on TVB in 2004. It stars Flora Chan 陳慧珊, Damian Lau 劉松仁, Kevin Cheng 鄭嘉穎 and Niki Chow 周麗淇.

== Synopsis ==
Early in the story, Leung Pak-yeen (Damian Lau) was in a dispute with his wife (Mary Hon) and they argued on a building rooftop. The wife fell from the building top and the murder was witnessed by one of the construction workers. The worker turned out to be an illegal immigrant in Hong Kong. He spent a great deal of time escaping Leung Pak-yeen and just about anyone who questioned his identity.

Soon the daughter of Leung Pak-yeen, Ceci (Niki Chow), spotted a newspaper with the construction worker. She attempted to track him down and failed numerous times. Upon cleaning up her dead mother's house, she discovered a diary written before her death. The book content was told as part of a flashback, which spoke about Leung Pak-yeen's true past. Apparently he went to mainland China to do illegal trafficking a long time ago for his business. He set up and sold out one of his partners to gain a bigger share of the trafficking profit. His partner was killed under the custody of the mainland police, and never made it out alive.

Ken (Kevin Cheng), the son of the partner, grew up thinking his father was just neglecting him. His girlfriend, Ceci, warned him about her findings in the diary, including her father's murder acts and motives. Ken soon realized his father did not neglect him when he was a child. Instead his father was set up by Leung Pak-yeen during the trafficking and killed. Both of them were motivated to track down the construction worker who witnessed at least one of the crimes.

Ken, Ceci, the construction worker would all end up in Hong Kong's High court in an attempt to put Leung Pak-yeen behind bars. Under oath, the construction worker would testify. Because of his poor credibility as an illegal immigrant and weak testimony going up against a top-notch lawyer, the case was lost. The father who was essentially responsible for the murder of two people earlier was now set free.

The story then shifted to the young couple with Ken and Ceci trying to put the event behind them and restart their life. Niki went from this immature girl to a more mature woman who was consumed with worries, especially with her murderous father set free. Tiffany (Flora Chan) was married to the murderous father, Leung Pak-yeen, and had a baby. To continue the feud, the father, Leung Pak-yeen would compete with Ken in their jade business. Eventually Ken would gain the upper hand, and the father was forced once again to do trafficking to sustain his business. His wife, Tiffany, urged him not to take this dangerous route again. He claimed it was necessary for the survival of his business and ventured off to Shanghai. He got lucky and escaped Shanghai police. Returning to Hong Kong, his wife now mistrusts him. He has basically been hiding too many secrets about murders, trafficking, and many side stories involving sacrificing friendships for money.

To force her trust, Leung Pak-yeen kidnapped the baby to forcefully reconnect the relationship. Tiffany would become miserable as she tried to play games to get her baby back. In an effort to chase the baby down, CeCi was violently hit by an SUV. After numerous twists, turns, lies and deceptions Leung Pak-yeen would give up, committing suicide. With the exception of his wife, everyone in his whole family died. Including Ceci who was unconscious from the accident, but then died after the second operation. Throughout the story, Tiffany was carrying a cursed jade necklace, which shared a similar fate with its previous owner. In the end, Ken, (Kevin Cheng) still manages to continue on with life, and has the same dream every night of marrying Ceci, (Niki Chow)

== Cast ==
- Flora Chan as Mok Hei-yee /Tiffany (莫希兒)
- Damian Lau as Leung Pak-yin (梁柏言)
- Kevin Cheng as Leung Ka-ming /Ken (梁家明)
- Niki Chow as Leung Wing-Sze /Ceci (梁詠思)
- Mary Hon
- Maggie Shiu as Yip Suk-gwun /Ivy (葉淑君)
- Ha Ping as Suen Yeen-chou (孫燕秋)
- Ha Yu as Mok Sai-long (莫世龍)
- Michelle Yip as Suen Yeen-chou (Younger Years)
- Michael Tong as Mok Sai-long (Younger Years)
- Stephen Au as Leung Pak-git (梁柏傑)
- Chan Hoi Yee as Oi Siu-kei (區小琪)
- Yee Zhi Yuen as Lau Tzi-kerng (劉志強)
- Hawick Lau as Mok Hei Man (莫希文)
- Akina Hong
- Rebecca Chan
- Hui Siu Hung
