= Under the Canopy of Love =

- 天幕下的戀人
- Genre: Modern Drama
- Starring: Kevin Cheng; Niki Chow; Bosco Wong
- Opening theme: "請講" by Kevin Cheng & Niki Chow
- Country of origin: Hong Kong
- Original language: Cantonese
- No. of episodes: 20

Production
- Producer: Amy Wong
- Running time: 45 minutes (approx.)

Original release
- Network: TVB
- Release: February 20 – March 17, 2006

Related
- The Seventh Day (2008)

Under The Canopy of Love (Traditional Chinese: 天幕下的戀人) is a TVB modern drama series broadcast in February 2006.

Due to the success of the series, a related series retaining the original cast was created, known as The Seventh Day (最美麗的第七天), which was broadcast in 2008.

== Synopsis ==
Because of a lost PDA, the lovely and childlike Fiona Ko Yat-Sze (Niki Chow) is brought together with her Prince Charming, a boy whom she had had a crush on since school days. Alan Shum Long (Kevin Cheng) is the Prince Charming, who, after graduation from school, lost touch with Sze. Their encounter takes place in a shopping mall, which is designed like a canopy.

Alan meets Nick Kuen Lik (Bosco Wong), a Taekwondo black belt who starts working as a security guard at the mall Alan works at. Nick develops deep respect for Alan and takes the initiative to acknowledge him as "big brother". The simple and honest Nick initially likes Sze's sister, who is a bit of a gold digger, but later falls for Sze. Meanwhile, another woman (Claire Yiu) falls for Long...

Later on, Nick is discovered to be the long lost son of the rich owner of the mall.

== Cast ==
Cast	Role	Description
Kevin Cheng	Shum Long (Alan) 沈朗	Langham Place Operation Director; Ko Yat-Sze's lover.
Niki Chow	Ko Yat-Sze (C) 高逸詩	Jewellery Store Owner; Sum Lorng's lover. Ko Yat-Ching and Ko Yat-Nam's sister.
Bosco Wong	Kuen Lik (Nick) 權力	Langham Place Security Guard
Claire Yiu	Yip ga-Wan (Karen) 葉嘉雲	Langham Corporation CEO; Yip Ji-Hong's older sister.
Charles Szeto (司徒瑞祈)	Yip Ji-Hong (Jason) 葉志航	Magazine Photographer; Yip Ka-Wan's younger brother. Ko Yat-Ching's husband.
Natalie Tong	Ko Yat-Ching (CoCo) 高逸晴	Student; Ko Yat-Sze and Ko Yat-Nam's younger sister. Yip Ji-Hong's wife.
Ha Yu	Ko Pak-Fai (David) 高柏輝	Magazine Photographer; Ko Yat-Sze, Ko Yat-Ching, and Ko Yat-Nam's father.
Yvonne Ho (何綺雲)	Ko Yat-Nam (Chris) 高逸嵐	Langham Place Marketing Director; Ko Yat-Sze and Ko Yat-Ching's older sister.
Benz Hui	Sum Sau-Ching 沈守正	Postman; Sum Lorng's father.
Angela Tong	Ma Siu-Mui (Suki) 馬小梅	
Karen Lee (李焯寧)	Noel 黃玉娟	Langham Place employee.

== Viewership ratings ==
	Week	Episode	Average Points	Peaking Points	References
1	February 20–24, 2006	1 — 5	30	—	
2	February 27 - March 3, 2006	6 — 10	31	—	
3	March 6–10, 2006	11 — 15	31	35	
4	March 13–17, 2006	16 — 20	33	37	

== Awards and nominations ==
=== Awards ===
39th TVB Anniversary Awards (2006)

- "Best Actor in a Leading Role" (Kevin Cheng - Alan Shum Long)

=== Nominations ===
39th TVB Anniversary Awards (2006)

- Nominated - "Best Drama"
- Nominated - "Best Actor in a Leading Role" (Kevin Cheng - Alan Shum Long)
- Nominated - "Best Actor in a Leading Role" (Bosco Wong - Nick Kuen Lik)
- Nominated - "Best Actress in a Leading Role" (Niki Chow - Fiona Ko Yat-Sze)
- Nominated - "Best Actor in a Supporting Role" (Ha Yu - David Ko Pak-Fai)
- Nominated - "Best Actress in a Supporting Role" (Natalie Tong - CoCo Ko Yat-Ching)
- Nominated - "Best Actress in a Supporting Role" (Yvonne Ho - Chris Ko Yat-Nam)
- Nominated - "My Favourite Male Character Role" (Kevin Cheng - Alan Shum Long)
- Nominated - "My Favourite Male Character Role" (Bosco Wong - Nick Kuen Lik)
- Nominated - "My Favourite Female Character Role" (Niki Chow - Fiona Ko Yat-Sze)

== Trivia ==
- The opening theme of the drama can be seen in episode 7 of 2013's Reality Check, another TVB production.
