= Niki Chow =

Hong Kong actress and singer

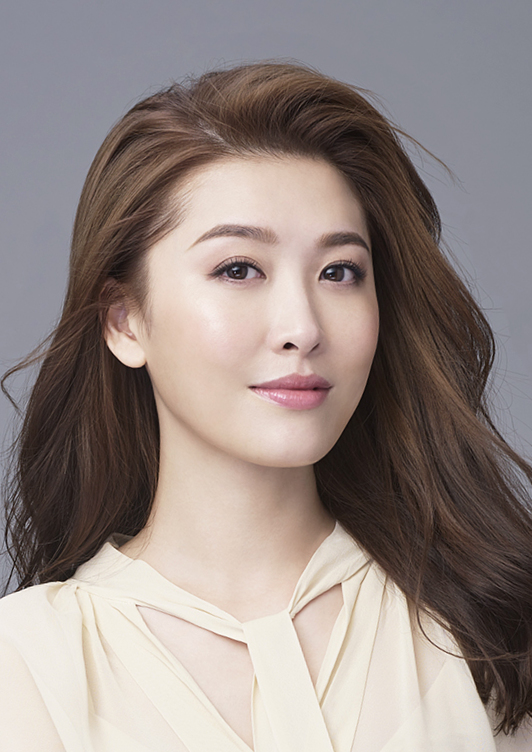
- Chow in 2018
- Born: August 30, 1979 (age 47); British Hong Kong
- Occupations: Actress; singer
- Years active: 1999–present
- Awards: TVB Anniversary Awards Most Improved Female Artiste; 2005 The Gentle Crackdown

Chinese name
- Traditional Chinese: 周勵淇
- Simplified Chinese: 周励淇
Transcriptions
Standard Mandarin
- Hanyu Pinyin: Zhōu Lì Qí
Yue: Cantonese
- Jyutping: chow1 lai6 kei4
- Musical career
- Genre: Cantopop
- Label: BMA Records (2005–2011)
- Website: chowlaiki.net

Niki Chow Lai-ki (周勵淇, previously 周麗淇; born August 30, 1979) is a Hong Kong actress and singer.

== Early life ==
Chow was born and raised in Hong Kong. She is the younger sister of the Hong Kong model Kathy Chow.

She is fluent in Mandarin. However, netizens have pointed that her Cantonese pronunciation is less than perfect. This is because she grew up speaking Shanghainese in her family.

== Acting career ==
At seventeen years old, Chow was offered a modeling job.

Several years later, she began her acting career in movies and television series, working mostly with TVB. Cast by Amy Wong, her first TVB series was Hard Fate. She is well known for her role and performance in Producer Lau Ka Ho's 2005 series The Gentle Crackdown, which stars Moses Chan and her. She won the Most Improved Actress award at the TVB Anniversary Awards (2005) for her performance in The Gentle Crackdown. Amy Wong's Under the Canopy of Love, starring Kevin Cheng, Bosco Wong and her, in the February of the following year also helped establish her popularity. An indirect sequel with the same cast and crew, The Seventh Day, came out February 2008. Her on-screen partnership with Kevin Cheng was well received by the audience in the years 2004–2008, along with rumours of the two dating in real life (until 2008). Her other series include The King of Snooker in 2009, with Adam Cheng and Patrick Tang. She filmed Sakura Memories (櫻紅醉), a travel documentary programme on Japan, in the spring of 2009 which aired on TVB in August 2009.

== Music career ==
Chow signed with BMA Records in 2005 and released her debut EP Pure Niki in the August of that year. In 2006, she released Child-Woman and a single Nikikaka. In January 2009, she released Redefine. In August 2010, she released a charity single Make a Wish with proceeds donated to an organization called Make-A-Wish Hong Kong. As well, in November 2010, she released her last EP under BMA Records: F.L.Y. (which stands for Freedom, Love, and Youth).

== Writing career ==
She is also the author of several books, including Girlfriend Diary (周麗淇·女朋友手記; 2005), a book of the same title as her 2006 album The Child Woman (2006), Detailed Little Things (細味心事; 2007), Happiness (幸福; 2009), and Cherish (珍惜; 2010). Her books are published under BMA Publications.

== Discography ==
=== Studio albums ===
Order	Album Information
1st	Pure Niki (EP + DVD): Released: 25 August 2005; Label: BMA Records
2nd	Child-Woman (EP + VCD): Release Date: 11 April 2006; Label:BMA Records
3rd	Nikikaka (Single – AVCD): Release Date: 18 August 2006; Label: BMA Records
4th	Redefine (EP + DVD): Release Date: 20 January 2009; Label: BMA Records
5th	Redefine Second Edition (EP + DVD): Release Date: 13 February 2009; Label: BMA Records
6th	Make a Wish (Single): Release Date: 27 August 2010; Label: BMA Records
7th	F.L.Y. (EP): Release Date: 11 November 2010; Label: BMA Records

=== Soundtrack appearances ===
- 明知不知傻痴痴 (theme song for The Gentle Crackdown (2005), a duet with co-star Moses Chan)
- 請講 (theme song for Under the Canopy of Love (2006), a duet with co-star Kevin Cheng)
- 抱著空氣 (sub theme for The Seventh Day (2008), a duet with co-star Kevin Cheng)
- 相信童話 (sub theme for The King of Snooker (2009), a duet with co-star Patrick Tang)
- 身在福中 (theme song for her TVB travel programme Sakura Memories (2009))
- 心變 (theme song for A Change of Heart 2013)

== Filmography ==
=== Television series ===
Year	English title	Original title	Role	Notes
2004	Hard Fate	翡翠戀曲	Leung Wing-Sze (Ceci)	Main Role
2005	The Gentle Crackdown	秀才遇著兵	Luk Sap-Yee (Sap Yee Mui)	Main Role TVB Anniversary Award for Most Improved Female Artiste
2006	Under the Canopy of Love	天幕下的戀人	Ko Yat-Sze	Main Role
2007	Colours of Love	森之愛情	Ah Yi	Guest star in Episode 8
2008	The Seventh Day	最美麗的第七天	Ling Ka-Yan	Main Role
2009	The King of Snooker	桌球天王	Yau Ka-Kan	Main Role
2009	The Book and the Sword	書劍恩仇錄	Huoqingtong	CCTV Series
2011–2012	Bottled Passion	我的如意狼君	Tsui Sum	Main Role
2013	Sergeant Tabloid	女警愛作戰	Lui Fei Hap	
2013	A Change of Heart	好心作怪	Yuen Siu Gat	
2014	The Virtuous Queen of Han	大汉贤后卫子夫	Princess Pingyang	
2016	Rogue Emperor	流氓皇帝	Yik Yung Yung	
2017	Nothing Gold Can Stay	那年花開月正圓	Qian Hong	
2018	Another Era	再創世紀	卓定垚	TVB-iQIYI co-production
2020	Blooming Days	岁岁青莲	Fang Huairui	
2024	See Her Again	太阳星辰	Chow Man Yi	

=== Film ===
Year	English title	Original title	Role	Notes
2001	Feel 100% II	百分百感覺2	Cherry	
2001	Fighting for Love	同居蜜友	Mindy	
2001	Horror Hotline...Big Head Monster	恐怖熱線之大頭怪嬰	Helen	
2001	Dummy Mommy Without a Baby	玉女添丁	Dina	
2002	New Blood	熱血青年		
2003	Diva - Ah Hey	下一站天后	Shadow	
2003	My Dream Girl	炮製女朋友		
2003	Good Times, Bed Times	戀上你的床	Peggy	
2003	Naked Ambition	豪情	Kiki	
2003	1:99			
2004	Love Battlefield	愛‧作戰	Ching	
2006	My Name Is Fame	我要成名		
2006	Heavenly Mission	天行者	Fion	
2011	Summer Love			Guest Star
2011	Old Master Q and Little Ocean Tiger			
2012	Lan Kwai Fong 2	喜愛夜蒲2		Cameo
2012	I Love Hong Kong 2012	2012我愛HK 喜上加囍		Cameo
2015	ATM			
2017	Chasing the Dragon	追龍	Mei	
2020	Enter the Fat Dragon	肥龍過江		

== Awards and nominations ==
Year	Nominated work	Award	Category	Result	Ref.
2005	The Gentle Crackdown	TVB Anniversary Awards	Most Improved Female Artiste	Won	
2018	Another Era	24th Huading Awards	Best Actress (Modern Drama)	Won	
