= Wilson Yip =

Hong Kong filmmaker and acter

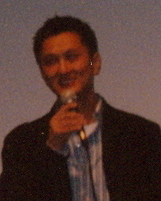
- Yip in 2006
- Born: 23 October 1964 (age 62); British Hong Kong
- Occupations: Filmmaker; actor
- Years active: 1992–present
- Awards: Hong Kong Film Critics Society Awards – Best Screenplay; 2000 Bullets Over Summer

Chinese name
- Traditional Chinese: 葉偉信
- Simplified Chinese: 叶伟信
Transcriptions
Standard Mandarin
- Hanyu Pinyin: Yé Wěixìn
Yue: Cantonese
- Jyutping: Jip6 Wai5seon3

Wilson Yip Wai-shun (simplified Chinese: 叶伟信; traditional Chinese: 葉偉信; born 23 October 1964) is a Hong Kong filmmaker and actor. His directing credits include Bio Zombie, The White Dragon, SPL: Sha Po Lang, Dragon Tiger Gate, Flash Point and the Ip Man series.

== Career ==
=== Early career ===
A film buff at an early age, Yip went to the cinema whenever he could and often wrote reviews on the backs of ticket stubs. He entered the movie business in the 1980s, starting out as a "gofer" and working his way up to assistant director.

His directorial debut was 01.00 AM, a three-segment horror compendium. He directed two of three parts, one with Veronica Yip as a nurse who sees dead pop stars, and Anita Yuen interviewing a demon.

His next effort, Daze Reaper, was a Category III exploitation film, based on a true-crime story about a prison guard who turns to crime. Next was Mongkok Story, an exploitive story in the vein of Young and Dangerous, and another horror trilogy, Midnight Zone, about urban myths. He also turned to comedy with Teaching Sucks, about two Hong Kong teachers played by Anthony Wong and Jan Lam.

In 1998 Wilson co-wrote and directed his biggest cult hit at the time, Bio Zombie, which was influenced by Dawn of the Dead and takes place in a shopping mall, where a small group of misfits bands together in order to survive.

=== Turning point ===
Yip next directed the 1999 crime-drama Bullets Over Summer, starring Francis Ng and Louis Koo as two detectives hunting a gang of deadly criminals who have to use a demented elderly woman's (Helena Law Lan) apartment for surveillance. The biggest-budget film of his career up to then, he considers Bullets Over Summer his "turning point". He shared a best-screenplay award at the 2000 Hong Kong Film Critics Society Awards for the film.

In 2000 he was picked by Golden Harvest to direct Skyline Cruisers, a big-budget action film. Yip did not get along with the cast and clashed with the studio's management over creative differences.

Other films include the science-fiction-action story 2002, and the romantic comedies, Dry Wood Fierce Fire (with Miriam Yeung and Louis Koo) and Leaving Me, Loving You (with Leon Lai and Faye Wong). In 2004, Yip also directed his first wuxia style film, The White Dragon, starring Cecilia Cheung and Francis Ng.

Yip also acts, mostly doing small roles. They include a pimp in The Runaway Pistol and a Taoist exorcist in the Pang Brothers' The Eye.

=== Films with Donnie Yen ===
In 2005, Yip directed his most critically acclaimed film, SPL: Sha Po Lang. A gritty return to the 1980s style of Hong Kong action cinema, SPL starred Simon Yam and Donnie Yen as Hong Kong police officers trying to pin a crime on an unstoppable gangster, portrayed by Sammo Hung.

In 2006, Yip re-teamed with Yen for an adaptation of a Hong Kong manga, Dragon Tiger Gate. In 2007 Yip released Flash Point, another martial-arts crime drama in the same vein as SPL. The film starred Donnie Yen, Louis Koo, and Collin Chou.

Yen and Yip's collaboration as actor and director, Ip Man, is a semi-biographical account of Ip Man, the first martial arts master (Chinese: Sifu) to teach the Chinese martial art of Wing Chun openly. It also featured fight choreography by Sammo Hung. The film was released in December 2008 and immediately shot to number one on its opening week in Hong Kong, earning over HK$2.8 million in three weeks.

Ip Man 2, which is produced by Raymond Wong, picks up on Ip Man's life after his migration to Hong Kong where he took on his most famous disciple, Bruce Lee. The film was released 29 April 2010.

In 2014, it was announced that Yip and Yen would reunite for a third Ip Man film, to start filming in early 2015 for release later in the year. The film was presented in theatres in 3D format for the first time in the franchise.

In 2016, Donnie Yen announced that he and Yip would collaborate once again on a fourth Ip Man film.

== Filmography ==
This is a list of films in which Wilson Yip was involved.

=== As filmmaker ===
Year	Film	Credit			Notes
Year	Film	Director	Screenwriter	Producer	Notes
1994	Victory	No	No	Executive	—N/a
1995	01:00 A.M.	Yes	No	No	—N/a
1995	Daze Raper	Yes	No	No	—N/a
1996	Hong Kong Showgirls	No	Yes	Executive	—N/a
1996	Mongkok Story	Yes	No	No	—N/a
1997	Midnight Zone	Yes	Yes	No	—N/a
1997	Teaching Sucks	Yes	Yes	No	—N/a
1998	Bio Zombie	Yes	Yes	No	—N/a
1999	Bullets Over Summer	Yes	Yes	No	—N/a
2000	Skyline Cruisers	Yes	No	No	—N/a
2000	Juliet in Love	Yes	Yes	No	Nominated – Hong Kong Film Award for Best Director
2001	2002	Yes	Yes	No	—N/a
2002	Dry Wood Fierce Fire	Yes	Yes	No	—N/a
2002	The Mummy, Aged 19	Yes	Yes	No	—N/a
2004	Leaving Me, Loving You	Yes	Story	No	—N/a
2004	The White Dragon	Yes	Yes	No	—N/a
2005	SPL: Sha Po Lang	Yes	Yes	No	—N/a
2006	Dragon Tiger Gate	Yes	No	No	—N/a
2007	Flash Point	Yes	No	No	—N/a
2008	Ip Man	Yes	No	No	Nominated – Hong Kong Film Award for Best Director
2010	All's Well, Ends Well 2010	No	No	Yes	—N/a
2010	Ip Man 2	Yes	No	No	Nominated – Hong Kong Film Award for Best Director
2011	A Chinese Ghost Story	Yes	No	No	—N/a
2011	Magic to Win	Yes	No	No	—N/a
2015	Triumph in the Skies	Yes	No	No	—N/a
2015	SPL II: A Time for Consequences	No	No	Yes	Won – Hong Kong Film Critics Society Award for Films of Merit
2015	Ip Man 3	Yes	No	No	Nominated – Hong Kong Film Award for Best Director
2016	League of Gods	No	No	Yes	Won – Golden Broom Award for Worst Film
2016	Heartfall Arises	No	No	Yes	—N/a
2017	Paradox	Yes	No	No	Nominated – Hong Kong Film Award for Best Director
2019	Ip Man 4: The Finale	Yes	No	Yes	Nominated – Hong Kong Film Award for Best Director
2021	Limbo	No	No	Yes	Nominated – Hong Kong Film Award for Best Film
2024	Last Song for You	No	No	Yes	—N/a
2024	Twilight of the Warriors: Walled In	No	No	Yes	Won – Hong Kong Film Award for Best Film
TBA	The Dream, the Bubble and the Shadow	Yes	Yes	Executive	—N/a

=== As actor ===
- United We Stand (1986)
- The Beloved Son of God (1988)
- Mr. Smart (1989)
- Little Cop (1989)
- The Fun, the Luck & the Tycoon (1990)
- Skinny Tiger, Fatty Dragon (1990)
- Gangs '92 (1992)
- Second to None (1992)
- Why Wild Girls (1994)
- Forbidden City Cop (1996)
- Mongkok Story (1996)
- Midnight Zone (1997)
- PR Girls (1998)
- Afraid of Nothing, the Jobless King (1999)
- Among the Stars (2000)
- United We Stand and Swim (2001)
- Final Romance (2001)
- You Shoot, I Shoot (2001)
- Horror Hotline... Big Head Monster (2001)
- The Runaway Pistol (2002)
- Happy Family (2002)
- Love Undercover (2002)
- The Eye (2002)
- Mighty Baby (2002)
- And Also the Eclipse (2004)
- Simply Actors (2007)
- All's Well, Ends Well 2011 (2011)
- 12 Golden Ducks (2015)
