= Cheung Ka-fai (film editor) =

Hong Kong film editor and actor

Cheung Ka-fai (Chinese: 張嘉輝) is a Hong Kong film editor and actor.

== Life and career ==
For his work on Benny Chan's Big Bullet (1996), which he co-edited with Peter Cheung, Cheung received both a Hong Kong Film Award and a Golden Horse Award. At the 39th Hong Kong Film Awards, Cheung won Best Editing for Ip Man 4: The Finale (2019). Cheung worked on Twilight of the Warriors: Walled In (2024), which won him Best Editing at the 43rd Hong Kong Film Awards.

== Filmography ==
=== Film editor ===
- A Better Tomorrow 2 (1987)
- Thunder Cops II (1989)
- The First Time Is the Last Time (1989)
- Mortuary Blues (1990)
- Center Stage (1991)
- Super Lady Cop (1992)
- Police Story 3 (a.k.a. Supercop) (1992)
- The Black Panther Warriors (1993)
- Once a Cop (1993)
- City Hunter (1993)
- In the Heat of Summer (1994)
- Twenty Something (1994)
- The Third Full Moon (1994)
- Touch of Evil (1995)
- Happy Hour (1995)
- Lost Boys in Wonderland (1995)
- Power Connection (1995)
- Thunderbolt (1995)
- The Christ of Nanjing (1995)
- Trilogy of Lust (1995)
- Yes Madam 5 (1996)
- What a Wonderful World (1996)
- Big Bullet (1996)
- The God of Cookery (1996)
- Black Mask (1996)
- On Fire (1996)
- Thunder Cop (1996)
- Downtown Torpedoes (1997)
- Lawyer Lawyer (1997)
- Task Force (1997)
- Killing Me Tenderly (1997)
- L - O - V - E ..... LOVE (1997)
- Techno Warriors (1997)
- God.com (1998)
- The Lucky Guy (1998)
- Tricky King (1998)
- Raped by An Angel 3: Sexual Fantasy of the Chief Executive (1998)
- Extreme Crisis (1998)
- Nude Fear (1998)
- Sex and Zen III (1998)
- Hitman (1998)
- Raped by an Angel 2: The Uniform Fan (1998)
- Bio Zombie (1998)
- The Love and Sex of the Eastern Hollywood (1998)
- PR Girls (1998)
- Hong Kong Spice Gals (1999)
- Sunshine Cops (1999)
- X Imp (1999)
- Afraid of Nothing, the Jobless King (1999)
- The Lord of Amusement (1999)
- The King of Debt Collecting Agent (1999)
- Gorgeous (1999)
- Bullets Over Summer (1999)
- The Mistress (1999)
- Wan Chai Empress (1999)
- Gen-X Cops (1999)
- Rave Fever (1999)
- The Kingdom of Mob (1999)
- Eternal Love (2000)
- Skyline Cruisers (2000)
- A War Named Desire (2000)
- Gen-Y Cops (2000)
- True Love (2000)
- Twilight Garden (2000)
- Roaring Wheels (2000)
- Juliet in Love (2000)
- When I Fall in Love... with Both (2000)
- Wishful Milenio (2000)
- Bruce Law Stunts (2000)
- Life (2000)
- The Legend of the Flying Swordsman (2000)
- Chinese Heroes (2001
- Fighting for Love (2001)
- Dead End (2001)
- Bakery Amour (2001)
- 2002 (2001)
- Stolen Love (2001)
- Funeral March (2001)
- Midnight Fly (2001)
- Final Romance (2001)
- Feel 100% II (2001)
- Extreme Challenge (2001)
- Thou Shall Not Commit (2001)
- Visible Secret II (2002)
- Dry Wood Fierce Fire (2002)
- Demi-Haunted (2002)
- Golden Chicken (2002)
- So Close (2002)
- Summer Breeze of Love (2002)
- Love Undercover (2002)
- The Mummy, Aged 19 (2002)
- Anna in Kungfuland (2003)
- Naked Ambition (2003)
- Love Undercover 2: Love Mission (2003)
- Lost in Time (2003)
- Golden Chicken 2 (2003)
- Heroic Duo (2003)
- Good Times, Bed Times (2003)
- The Miracle Box (2004)
- The Twins Effect II (2004)
- Heat Team (2004)
- Explosive City (2004)
- The White Dragon (2004)
- A-1 (2004)
- Leaving Me, Loving You (2004)
- One Nite in Mongkok (2004)
- Love On the Rocks (2004)
- SPL: Sha Po Lang (2005)
- House of Fury (2005)
- We Are Family (2006)
- Dragon Tiger Gate (2006)
- Men Suddenly in Black 2 (2006)
- Silk (2006)
- Mr. 3 Minutes (2006)
- Ming Ming (2007)
- Simply Actors (2007)
- Flash Point (2007)
- Anna & Anna (2007)
- Three Kingdoms: Resurrection of the Dragon (2008)
- Ip Man (2008)
- Shinjuku Incident (2009)
- Murderer (2009)
- La Comédie humaine (2010)
- Wu Dang (2012)
- A Moment of Love (2013)
- The Monkey King (2014)
- Europe Raiders (2018) - supervising editor
- The Wandering Earth (2019)
- Ip Man 4: The Finale (2019)
- Twilight of the Warriors: Walled In (2024)

=== Actor ===
- The Inspector Wears Skirts IV (1992)
- PR Girls (1998)
