= Joe Ma (filmmaker) =

Hong Kong filmmaker (born 1964)

Joe Ma Wai-ho
- Born: 21 February 1964 (age 62); Hong Kong
- Occupations: Director; screenwriter; producer

Chinese name
- Traditional Chinese: 馬偉豪
Transcriptions
Yue: Cantonese
- Yale Romanization: Máh Wáih Hòuh
- Jyutping: Maa⁵ Wai⁵ Hou⁴

Joseph Ma Wai-ho is a Hong Kong film director, scriptwriter and producer. Among the films he has directed, Feel 100% (1996), The Lion Roars (2002) and Love Undercover (2002) were popular films at the Hong Kong box office. Love Undercover won the Audience Award at the 2002 Far East Film Festival. In 1997, Ma founded the film company Brilliant Idea Group Limited (BIG). Its first film, Full Alert (1997), received five nominations at the 17th Hong Kong Film Awards.

Ma's career in film started before completing secondary school, where he wrote a play that would later be adapted into the film Happy Ghost (1984). Ma first worked as a writer and made his debut as a film director with Rich Man (1992). As a writer, he primarily made romantic comedy films. By 2007, he had written all films he has directed and also wrote films for other directors such as Daniel Lee's Black Mask (1996) and Ringo Lam's Victim (1999).

== Biography ==
Joe Ma was born on February 21, 1964. He was a writer during his tenure of Secondary 6 level in secondary school in Hong Kong. He wrote a play that would later be adapted into Happy Ghost (1984). Ma graduated in 1987 from the University of Hong Kong with a major in Contemporary Chinese History.

Ma first worked as a writer and made his debut as a film director with Rich Man (1992) as well as writing Over the Rainbow, Under the Skirt (1994). The 1994 film was drawn from Ma's own memories of growing up. Feel 100% (1996) starring Ekin Cheng and Gigi Lai was a box office success in Hong Kong.

In 1997, Ma founded the film company Brilliant Idea Group Limited (BIG). Its first film was Ringo Lam's Full Alert (1997) which received five nominations at the 17th Hong Kong Film Awards. As a producer, Ma worked with several new directors such as Wilson Yip with Bullets Over Summer (1999), Alan Mak's A War Named Desire (2001) and Cheang Pou-soi's Love Battlefield (2004).

Ma directed two other films popular in the Hong Kong box office in the early 2000s with The Lion Roars (2002) and Love Undercover (2002).

== Style ==
Ma specializes in romantic comedy films and stories about youth romance. By 2007, Ma had written all of the 23 films he directed. Outside his own films, Ma would write for other directors, such as Daniel Lee's Black Mask (1996), Benny Chan's Big Bullet (1996), and Ringo Lam's Victim (1999).

== Reception ==
Love Undercover won the Audience Award at the 2002 Far East Film Festival in Undine, Italy.

== Filmography as director ==
Year	Title	Ref(s)
1992	Rich Man	
1994	Over the Rainbow, Under the Skirt	
1995	The Golden Girls	
1996	Till Death Do Us Laugh	
1996	Feel 100%	
1996	Feel 100%... Once More	
1997	He Comes from Planet K	
1997	First Love Unlimited	
1997	Lawyer Lawyer	
1999	Afraid of Nothing: The Jobless King	
2001	Feel 100% II	
2001	Fighting for Love	
2001	Funeral March	
2001	Dummy Mommy, Without a Baby	
2002	The Lion Roars	
2002	Love Undercover	
2002	Summer Breeze of Love	
2003	Next Station... Tin Hau	
2003	Feel 100% 2003	
2003	Love Undercover 2: Love Mission	
2003	Sound of Colors	
2004	Three of a Kind	
2004	Hidden Heroes	
2005	Embrace Your Shadow	
2006	Love Undercover 3	
2008	Sasori	
2010	My Sassy Girl 2	
2011	Stand by Me	
2012	The Lion Roars 2	
2016	Days of Our Own	
2017	On Fallen Wings	
