= List of Hong Kong films of 2004 =

This article lists feature-length Hong Kong films released in 2004.

== Box office ==
The highest-grossing Hong Kong films released in 2004 by domestic box office gross revenue, are as follows:

Highest-grossing films released in 2004
Rank	Title	Domestic gross
1	Kung Fu Hustle	HK$61,278,697
2	Fantasia	HK$25,244,771
3	New Police Story	HK$21,109,502
4	Magic Kitchen	HK$20,228,159
5	Elixir of Love	HK$15,809,152
6	Yesterday Once More	HK$15,477,157
7	The Twins Effect II	HK$14,961,970
8	Three of a Kind	HK$14,790,180
9	Super Model	HK$13,176,478
10	Jiang Hu	HK$12,917,067

== Releases ==
Title	Director	Cast	Genre	Notes
20:30:40	Sylvia Chang	Sylvia Chang, Rene Lau		
2046	Wong Kar-wai	Tony Leung Chiu Wai, Zhang Ziyi, Faye Wong	Sci-fi Romance	Entered into the 2004 Cannes Film Festival
6 Strong Guys	Barbara Wong	George Lam, Ekin Cheng		
6 A.M.	Adrian Kwan			
A Wedding or a Funeral	Ho Chi-hang	Sam Lee, Pauline Suen		
A World Without Thieves	Feng Xiaogang	Andy Lau, Rene Liu		
A-1	Gordon Chan Kar Shan			
Ab-Normal Beauty	Oxide Pang Shun			
And Also The Eclipse	Bryan Chang	Chan Shan-shan, Josie Ho		
Astonishing	Herman Yau	Christy Chung, Alex Fong		
Beyond Our Ken	Pang Ho-Cheung			
Boxer's Story	Ivan Lai	Yuen Biao, Gloria Yip	Drama	
Breaking News	Johnnie To	Richie Ren, Kelly Chen	Crime, Action	Screened at the 2004 Cannes Film Festival
Butterfly	Yan Yan Mak		Drama	
Colour Blossoms	Yonfan	Teresa Cheung, Ha Ri-soo		
Dating Death	Herman Yau	Stephy Tang, Edwin Siu		
Driving Miss Wealthy	James Yuen	Lau Ching-Wan, Gigi Leung		
Elixir of Love	Riley Ip	Miriam Yeung, Richie Ren		
Enter the Phoenix	Stephen Fung	Eason Chan, Daniel Wu		
Escape from Hong Kong Island	Simon Lui	Jordan Chan, Chapman To		
Explosive City	Sam Leong	Simon Yam, Alex Fong		
Fantasia	Wai Ka-Fai	Cecilia Cheung, Louis Koo		
Forever Yours	Clifton Ko	Amanda Lee, Chow Man-kin		
Heat Team	Dante Lam	Aaron Kwok, Eason Chan		
Herbal Tea	Herman Yau	Jordan Chan, Candy Lo		
Hidden Heroes	Joe Ma, Cheang Pou-Soi	Ronald Cheng, Charlene Choi	Science fiction comedy	
In-Laws, Out-Laws	Clifton Ko	Eric Tsang, Linda Shum		
Itchy Heart	Matt Chow	Lau Ching-Wan, Carina Lau		
Jade Goddess of Mercy	Ann Hui	Nicholas Tse, Zhao Wei		Entered into the 26th Moscow International Film Festival
Jiang Hu	Ching-Po Wong	Andy Lau, Jacky Cheung, Shawn Yue, Edison Chen	Triad	
Koma	Law Chi-Leung	Karena Lam	Lee Sin-je	
Kung Fu Hustle	Stephen Chow	Stephen Chow, Huang Shengyi, Yuen Wah, Yuen Qiu, Danny Chan Kwok Kwan	Action comedy	
Leave Me Alone	Danny Pang	Charlene Choi, Ekin Cheng		
Leaving Me, Loving You	Wilson Yip	Leon Lai, Faye Wong		
Life Express	Blacky Ko	Richie Ren	Ruby Lin	
Love Battlefield	Soi Cheang	Eason Chan, Niki Chow		
Love is a Many Stupid Thing	Wong Jing, Ko Sin-ming	Eric Tsang, Chapman To		
Love on the Rocks	Dante Lam, Chan Hing-Kai	Louis Koo, Gigi Leung, Donnie Yen, Charlene Choi		
Love Trilogy	Derek Chiu	Francis Ng, Anita Yuen		
Magic Kitchen	Lee Chi-ngai	Sammi Cheng, Andy Lau, Jerry Yan		
McDull de la Bun	Yuen Kin-to	Andy Lau, Sandra Ng		
Moving Targets	Wong Jing	Nicholas Tse, Edison Chan		
My Sweetie	Yip Nim-sum	Sammy, Stephy Tang		
New Police Story	Benny Chan	Jackie Chan	Crime, Action	
One Nite in Mong Kok	Derek Yee	Cecilia Cheung, Daniel Wu		
Osaka Wrestling Restaurant	Lo Wai-tak	Timmy Hung, Sammo Hung	Comedy	
Papa Loves You	Herman Yau	Tony Leung Ka-Fai, Charlene Choi		
Protege de la Rose Noire	Donnie Yen, Barbara Wong	Charlene Choi, Gillian Chung		
Rice Rhapsody	Kenneth Bi	Sylvia Chang, Martin Yan	Comedy	
Sex and the Beauties	Wong Jing	Carina Lau, Cecilia Cheung		
Silver Hawk	Jingle Ma	Michelle Yeoh	Action	
Super Model	Vincent Kuk	Ronald Cheng, Karena Lam		
The Attractive One	Matt Chow	Lau Ching-Wan, Joey Yung		
The Cat of Hollywood	Pierre Lam	Plato Lai, Phoebe Chu, Yo Yo Chen, Jason Yip	Suspense	In Competition at the 9th Busan International Film Festival "New Current Award", "Closing Film" at the Taiwan Phantom Film Festival 2004, Selected at the 1st Hong Kong Asia Film Festival
The Eye 2	Danny Pang, Oxide Pang	Shu Qi	Yuen Lai-kei	
House of Flying Daggers	Zhang Yimou	Andy Lau, Takeshi Kaneshiro, Zhang Ziyi		
The Miracle Box	Adrian Kwan	Tse Kwan-ho	Ada Choi	
The Twins Effect II	Yuen Kwai, Patrick Leung	Jaycee Chan, Charlene Choi, Donnie Yen		
The White Dragon	Wilson Yip	Cecilia Cheung, Francis Ng, Andy On, Hui Shiu Hung	Comedy	
Three Extreme: Dumplings	Fruit Chan	Miriam Yeung, Tony Leung		
Three of a Kind	Joe Ma	Michael Hui, Miriam Yeung, Lau Ching Wan		
Throw Down	Johnnie To	Aaron Kwok, Louis Koo, Cherrie In		
Ultimate Fight	Leung Siu-hung	Wong Ka-ming, Lee Wai-shing		
Unbearable Heights	Jonathan Chik	Bowie Lam, Maggie Siu, Sonija Kwok, Michael Tong		TV movie
Unplugging Nightmare	Elfa Lee	Yoyo Mung, Edmond Leung		
When Beckham Meets Owen	Wong Sau-ping	Leung Hiu-fung, Lau Chun-wo		
Who is the Next Boss	Chan Shu-Kai	Michael Tse, Gregory Lee, Frankie Ng, Michael Chan		
Why Me, Sweetie?!	Jingle Ma	Louis Koo, Cherrie Ying, Tats Lau		
Xanda	Marco Mak	Sang Weilin, Zhao Zilong		
Yesterday Once More	Johnnie To	Andy Lau, Sammi Cheng		
