= Ekin Cheng filmography =

This is the filmography of Hong Kong actor and singer Ekin Cheng

== Films ==
=== Feature film ===
Year	Title	English Title	Role	Notes
1992	應召女郎1988之二現代應召女郎	Girls Without Tomorrow 1992	Onn	
1993	追男仔	Boys Are Easy	Lee Chi Ko	
1993	超級學校霸王	Future Cops	Ken	
1994	神龍賭聖之旗開得勝	Always Be the Winners	Yam Tin Sau	
1994	人魚傳說	Mermaid Got Married	Chi	
1994	男兒當入樽	Let's Go Slam Dunk	Kao Chiu	
1994	風塵三女俠	Why Wild Girls	Mike	
1994	新英雄本色	Return to a Better Tomorrow	Tong Chun	
1995	不道德的禮物	I'm Your Birthday Cake	Water	
1995	廟街故事	Mean Street Story	Melvin	
1996	百分百感覺	Feel 100%	Jerry	
1996	百分百啱Feel	Feel 100% Once More	Marco	
1996	古惑仔之人在江湖	Young & Dangerous	Chan Ho Nam	
1996	古惑仔2之猛龍過江	Young & Dangerous 2	Chan Ho Nam	
1996	古惑仔3之隻手遮天	Young & Dangerous 3	Chan Ho Nam	
1997	97古惑仔之戰無不勝	Young & Dangerous 4	Chan Ho Nam	
1997	愛上百份百英雄	We're No Bad Guys	Plane	
1998	風雲之雄霸天下	The Storm Riders	Whispering Wind	
1998	幻影特攻	Hot War	Tango One	
1998	古惑仔情義篇之洪興十三妹	Portland Street Blues	Chan Ho Nam	Cameo
1998	98古惑仔之龍爭虎鬥	Young & Dangerous 5	Chan Ho Nam	
1999	中華英雄	A Man Called Hero	Hero Hua	
2000	龍火	Dragon Heat	Bath House Person	Cameo
2000	Bad Boy特攻	For Bad Boys Only	King Chan	
2000	友情歲月之山雞故事	Those Were the Days...	Chan Ho Nam	Cameo
2000	辣手回春	Help!!!	Joe	
2000	烈火戰車2極速傳說	The Legend of Speed	Sky	
2000	勝者為王	Born to Be King (aka Young and Dangerous 6)	Chan Ho Nam	
2000	東京攻略	Tokyo Raiders	Pat Tai Yung	
2000	決戰紫禁之巔	The Duel	Simon the Snow Blower	
2001	九龍冰室	Goodbye Mr. Cool	Cool Nine Dragon	
2001	蜀山傳	The Legend of Zu	King Sky	
2001	拳神	The Avenging Fist	Young Dark	Cameo
2002	暗戰2	Running Out of Time 2	Thief	
2002	無限復活	Second Time Around	Ren	
2002	當男人變成女人	Women From Mars	Tom Kan	
2002	我老婆唔夠秤	My Wife Is 18	Cheung	
2003	雙雄	Heroic Duo	Senior Inspector Ken Li	
2003	千機變	The Twins Effect	Reeve	
2003	炮製女朋友	My Dream Girl	Joe Lam	
2003	戀之風景	The Floating Landscape	Sam	
2003	安娜與武林	Anna in Kungfuland	Ken Kei	
2004	六壯士	Six Strong Guys	Long	
2004	見習黑玫瑰	Protégé de la Rose Noire	Jim Lo	
2004	死亡寫真	Abnormal Beauty	Yiu Chun-Kit	Cameo
2004	阿孖有難	Leave Me Alone	Yiu Chun-Man/Yiu Chun-Kit	
2005	後備甜心	It Had to Be You!	Jack	
2005	三岔口	Divergence	To Hou-Sun	
2006	我要成名	My Name Is Fame	Himself	Cameo
2006	天行者	Heavenly Mission	Autumn Yip	
2007	森冤	Forest of Death	Shum Shu Hai	
2008	第一誡	Rule No. 1		
2008	親密	Claustrophobia	Tom	
2009	風雲II	The Storm Warriors (aka The Storm Riders 2)	Whispering Wind	
2009	KAMUI外傳	Kamui Gaiden	Dumok	Japanese film; Cameo
2010	飛砂風中轉	Once a Gangster	Swallow	
2010	月滿軒尼詩	Crossing Hennessy	Dentist	Cameo
2011	戀夏戀夏戀戀下	Summer Love	Mysophobia	Cameo
2011	無價之寶	Treasure Hunt	路志明 Andy Lu	Cameo
2011	東成西就2011	East Meets West 2011	Daxiong	
2011		Legend of a Rabbit		
2012	春嬌與志明	Love in the Buff	Himself	Cameo
2012	我老公唔生性	My Sassy Hubby	Cheung	
2013	忠烈楊家將	Saving General Yang	Yang Yan Ping	
2014	盜馬記	Horseplay	Cheung Ho	
2014	大话天仙	Just Another Margin	Mao Song	
2014	分手100次	Break Up 100	Sam	
2015	全力扣殺	Full Strike	Lau Dan	
2015	恋する ヴァンパイア	Vampire in Love	Derek	Japanese film
2015	煎饼侠	Jian Bing Man	Himself	Cameo
2016	iGirl 夢情人	iGirl	Lin Xiaofeng	
2017	小男人週記3之吾家有喜	The Yuppie Fantasia 3	Bobo's friends	Cameo
2017	指甲刀人魔	A Nail Clipper Romance	Master	
2018	黄金兄弟	Golden Job	狮王	
2018	三國殺·幻	Legends of the Three Kingdoms	Luo Wen	
2022	深宵閃避球	Life Must Go On	Jones	
2024	久別重逢	Last Song for You	So Sing-wah	

=== Television film ===
Year	Title	English Title	Role	Notes
1995	殺手風雷	Killer's Codes	Lei Jing-hua	

=== Voice acting ===
Year	Title	English Title	Role	Director	Production company	Notes
2000	人妖打排球	The Iron Ladies	Captain Ekin	Youngyooth & Thongkonthun	Tai Entertainment	A Thai movie that was shown in Hong Kong and several Hong Kong stars dubbed the voices of the main cast in Cantonese.
2003	人妖打排球 2	The Iron Ladies 2	Captain Ekin	Youngyooth & Thongkonthun	Tai Entertainment	A Thai movie that was shown in Hong Kong and several Hong Kong stars dubbed the voices of the main cast in Cantonese.

== Television ==
=== TVB series ===
This is the list of television dramas and variety shows of Hong Kong actor and singer Ekin Cheng.

Note: English title in italic indicates the name is simply a translation of the Chinese title as no official English title exists.

Year	Title	English Title	Genre	No. of episodes	Released	Role	Notes
1986	人海綠皮書		Modern drama				
1987	鐳射青春	Young Beat	Modern drama	12		Zhou Ming	
1987	成吉思汗	Genghis Khan	Historical drama	10		Jochi	
1990	天若有情	The Witness of Time	Modern drama	20		Lo Tak-pui (Julian)	
1990	燃燒歲月	A Time of Taste	Costume drama	20		Mai Ka-fung	The first TV drama with Maggie Siu, who played his stepmother in the drama.
1990	命運快車	Beyond Trust	Modern drama	20		Keung Sai-kit	
1990	閉門一家千	The Confidence Men	Modern drama	20		Yau Nai-kau	
1990	亞二一族	Let It Be Me	Modern drama	20			
1991	我愛玫瑰園	Be My Guest	Modern sitcom	133		Pau Siu-fan	Cameo
1991	蜀山奇俠之仙侶奇緣	The Zu Mountain Saga	Wuxia	20	VCD	Shek Sang	First time as the leading male.
1991	月兒彎彎照九州	Beside the Seaside Beside the Sea	Costume drama	15		To Sun-fung	
1991	血璽金刀	Thief of Honour	Wuxia	20		Ling On-fung	
1992	金蛇郎君	Golden Snake Sword	Wuxia	20	DVD	Kai Lin-wan	
1992	92鍾無艷	The Mark of Triumph	Modern drama	20		Chun Kit	
1992	男人勿近	A Tale of One City	Modern drama	20		Tuet Sing-chun	
1992	九反威龍	Crime Fighters	Modern drama	20		Lau King-shing	A series that was made after Ekin and Maggie Siu's relationship went public.
1992	極度空靈之入夢	Tales from Beyond	Modern/Costume drama (Mystery, Horror, Fantasy, Supernatural)	13		Chen Yang	A 13 episodes TV series consisted of 13 short stories. Ekin portray the main character of the tenth story ( episode 10 ).
1993	射鵰英雄傳之南帝北丐	The Condor Heroes Return	Wuxia	20	VCD	Duen Chi-hing	
1993	孤星劍	The Lone Star Swordsman	Wuxia	15		Duen Long	
1993	中神通王重陽	Rage and Passion	Wuxia	20	VCD	Wong Chung-yeung	
1994	笑看風雲	Instinct	Modern drama	40	VCD/DVD	Pau Man-lung	Last TV series with Nadia Chan after making seven TV series together and known as one of the greatest on-screen couples of all time.
1994	婚姻物語	Knot to Treasure	Modern romance	20		Ching Fong-chung (Alex)	
1999	雙面伊人	Face to Face	Modern drama	20		Yiu Lok-tin	
2004	赤沙印記@四葉草.2	Sunshine Heartbeat	Modern romance	13			Cameo
2005	隨時候命	Always Ready	Modern drama	30	VCD/DVD (Chinese and English subtitles)	Ko Hor-fung (Matt Sir)	

=== TVB Variety Shows ===
Year	Title	English Title	Released	Notes
1989 - 1990	430太空梭	430 Rocket		Host of the children afternoon program.
2005	奇幻潮	Bizarre Files		Host
2006	向世界出發 1	On the Road (Season 1, Part 4)	DVD	Host
2006	美女廚房	Beautiful Cooking Season 1	DVD	Guest with Jordan Chan in episode 10
2006	志雲飯局	Be My Guest (TV series) (Part 3)	DVD	Guest in episode 20
2007	世界自然基金會:愛海洋．愛鯨鯊	WWF Special: Ekin and Whale Sharks		Host
2008	好友移城	Two On the Road		Host with guests Karena Lam and Eric Kot in episodes 10 & 11
2009	美女廚房	Beautiful Cooking Season 2	DVD	Guest with Eric Kot, Kenny Bee, Kit Mak in episode 21
2011	鄭伊健BEAUTIFUL LIFE	Ekin Cheng 2011		Host with guests Karena Lam, Eric Kot, Sandy Lam, Leo Ku, Andy Lau, Charlene Choi, Wilson Chin, Andrew Lau, Carlo Chin, Chan Kwong-wing
2011	華麗明星賽	All Star Glam Exam		Guest with Fala Chen, Charmaine Sheh and Eric Kot in episode 8

=== Others ===
Year	Title	English Title	Genre	No. of episodes	Released	Role	Notes
2000	小寶與康熙 (aka鹿鼎記)	The Duke of Mount Deer	Period action	40	VCD/DVD	Chen Jinnan	Cameo. Featured in the first three episodes.
2001	新楚留香	The New Adventures of Chor Lau-heung	Period action	35	VCD/DVD	Li Xunhuan	Cameo. Featured in the first three episodes.
2002	香港明星迷	Hong Kong Idol Fan	Modern Japanese drama			As himself	Cameo. Acting as himself.
2006		Project Ultraman	Action drama	52		Ultraman Elite	Release is postponed indefinitely due to copyright issues.
2008	霍元甲	Huo Yuanjia	Period action	42	VCD/DVD (Chinese & English Subs)	Huo Yuanjia	The first Chinese TV drama Ekin had made with him as the lead.
2023	百萬人推理	Million-follower Detective	Mystery		Streaming; Netflix		Main role.
