= Whispers and Moans =

Whispers and Moans may refer to:

- Whispers and Moans (film), a 2007 film by Herman Yau
- "Whispers and Moans", a song by Crowded House from Woodface
