= Conman in Tokyo =

2000 Hong Kong film by Ching Siu-tung

- DVD cover
- Traditional Chinese: 中華賭俠
- Simplified Chinese: 中华赌侠
- Hanyu Pinyin: Zhōng Huá Dǔ Xiá
- Jyutping: Zung1 Waa4 Dou2 Hap6
- Directed by: Ching Siu-tung
- Screenplay by: Law Yiu-fai
- Produced by: Wong Jing
- Starring: Louis Koo; Nick Cheung; Athena Chu; Christy Chung
- Cinematography: Ko Chiu-lam
- Edited by: Poon Hung
- Music by: Cheung Shung-kei; Cheung Shung-tak
- Production companies: Star East; BoB and Partners Co. Ltd.
- Release date: 31 August 2000
- Running time: 103 minutes
- Country: Hong Kong
- Languages: Cantonese; Japanese
- Box office: HK$7,300,184

Conman in Tokyo is a 2000 Hong Kong action comedy film directed by Ching Siu-tung and starring Louis Koo, Nick Cheung, Athena Chu and Christy Chung. The film is a sequel to the 1999 film The Conmen in Vegas in title only.

== Plot ==
Hong Kong's gambling champion Cool (Louis Koo) was once boundlessly glorious, specializing in a card-flying stunt that reputed the gambling world. In Asia, only Japan's Tetsuo (Yasuaki Kurata) is considered a worthy opponent to Cool. Cool is bent on defeating Tetsuo to become Asia's number one. To gain this title, Cool works hard to improve his gambling skills, but was framed by his god-brother Yeung Kwong (Ben Lam), who tricks Cool's girlfriend, Karen (Athena Chu), and marries her. Cool rushes into the wedding hall and falls into Yeung's trap. Karen sees through Yeung's scheme and while protecting Cool, she gets shot and becomes a vegetable as a result. However, since Karen is legally married to Yeung, Cool is unable take her away back to Hong Kong and Cool retires from the gambling world and opens a Chinese restaurant in Japan and everyday, Cool will secretly take a look at the unconscious Karen.

Several years later, an agile triad punk named Jersy (Nick Cheung) appears in Mongkok. Jersy idolizes Cool and always wanted to become the latter's disciple. His wish is never able to come true until one day, after he won a gambling match during a tour in Japan with his girlfriend, Banana (Christy Chung). When in Japan, Jersy happens to walk into Cool's restaurant where gangsters were causing trouble. Cool and Jersy work together to get rid of the gangsters and Jersy discovers Cool's identity and they become friends.

At the same time, Tetsuo is bent on battling Cool to prove that he is Asia's number one. However, Cool, who has no intention of re-entering the gambling world, rejects Tetsuo. Desperate for Tetsuo to battle Cool to execute his scheme, Yeung hires Karen's younger twin sister (Athena Chu) from America to lure Cool, and plans to kill them during their battle. Desperate, Cool breaks his vow and engages in a century battle against Tetsuo.

== Cast ==
- Louis Koo as Cool
- Nick Cheung as Jersy
- Athena Chu as Karen/ Karen's twin sister
- Christy Chung as Jersy's girlfriend, Banana
- Ben Lam as Yeung Kwong
- Bryan Leung as Turkey
- Yasuaki Kurata as Tetsuo
- Joe Cheng as Joe from Causeway Bay
- Wong Tin-lam as Fatty
- Zuki Lee as Turkey's girlfriend
- Ray Pang
- Four Tse
- Lee Diy-yue
- Chan Siu-wah as Turkey's thug
- Ho Chung-wai as Tetsuo's thug
- Kam Loi-kwan as Tetsuo's thug
- Lam Kwok-kit as Tetsuo's thug
- So Wai-nam as Tetsuo's thug
- Lee Kim-wing as Turkey's thug
- Chow Mei-shing as Turkey's thug
- Lui Siu-ming as Turkey's thug
- Hon Ping as Thug
- Tsim Siu-ling as Thug
- Keung Hak-shing as Thug
- Choi Hin-cheung as Thug
- Chow Pok-foo as Card dealer
- Ankee Leung
- Prudence Kao
- Ho Chi-moon
- Mak Wai-cheung as Swordsman
- Yu Man-kei

== Reception ==
=== Critical ===
Andrew Saroch of Far East Films rated the film a score of 3 stars out of 5 and commented on the film's comedy as "sometimes amusing" and sometimes "crude" and calls the film "mostly entertaining." LoveHKFilm gave the film a negative review criticizing the last of originality, citing " there isn’t much here that hasn’t been done before." HKFilm.net rated the film with a score of 6.5 out of 10 and criticizes Nick Cheung's performance, the editing, but praises its production values and action sequences.

=== Box office ===
The film grossed HK$7,300,184 at the Hong Kong box office during its theatrical run from 31 August to 27 September 2000.
