= Tanjong Katong Secondary School =

Singapore secondary school

- 130 Haig Road, Singapore 438796

Information
- Type: Autonomous; Government
- Motto: Diligentia, Ingenium, Dexteritas (Diligence, Ingenuity, Dexterity)
- Established: 1956; 70 years ago
- School code: 3512
- Principal: Ruby Khoo
- Gender: Mixed
- Enrolment: ~1000
- Colour: Green White
- Team name: Team TK
- Website: Official website

Tanjong Katong Secondary School (TKSS) is a co-educational government autonomous school in Singapore.

== History ==
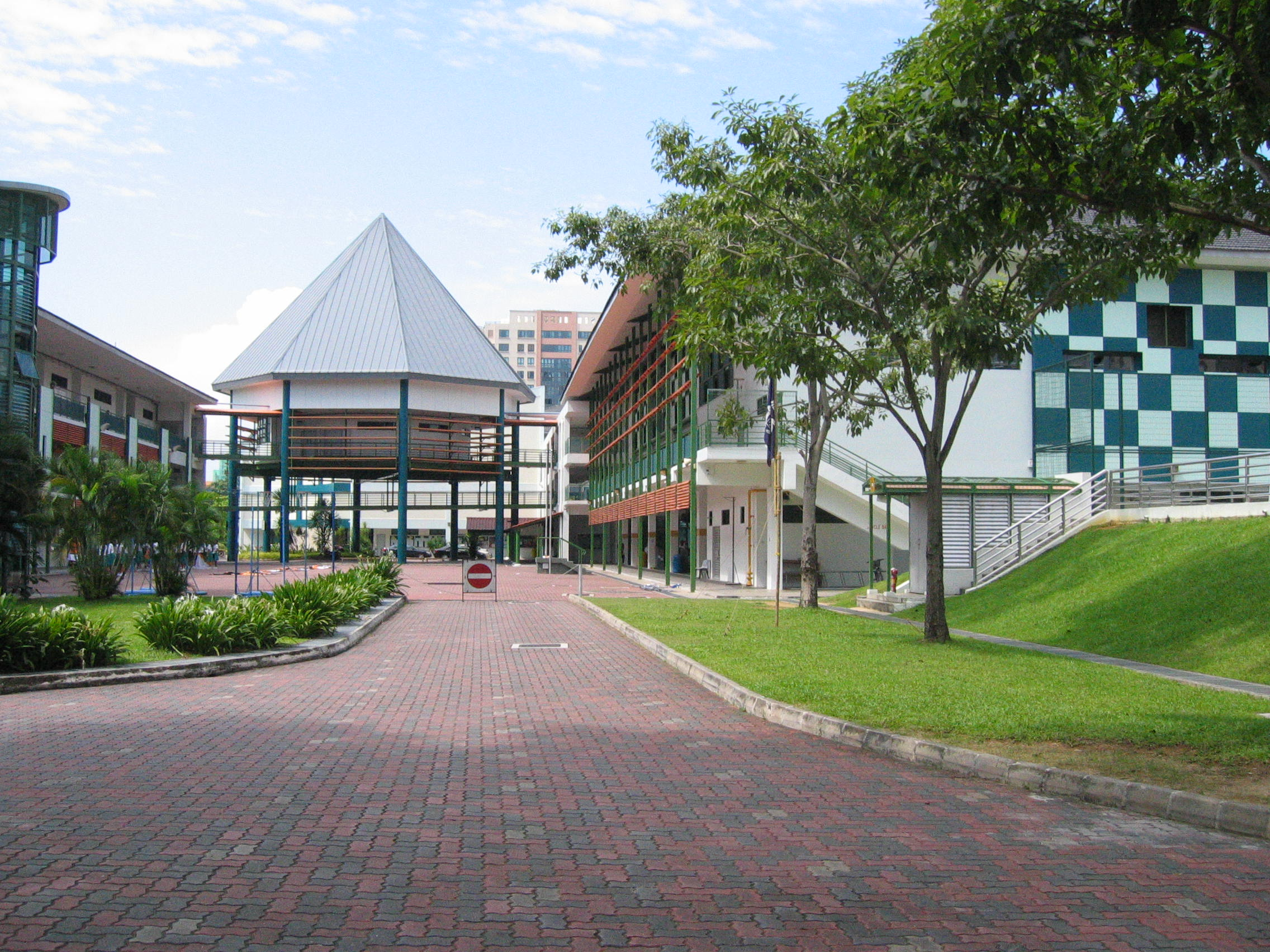
The school's Assembly Plaza

The school was first opened in 1956 as Tanjong Katong Secondary Technical School, accepting boys only. In 1969, the school began to take in female students, and in 1970, new centralised workshops, science laboratories and classrooms were constructed. By 1979, the number of students had risen to 5,000.

The school was renamed Tanjong Katong Secondary School in 1993, and in 1996 the school acquired the premises of the neighbouring Tanjong Katong Girls' School. Two years later, the school moved to its new premises at 130 Haig Road, which is about 550 metres away from its old location.

In 2004, the school was accorded Autonomous status, and Best Practice Award for Teaching and Learning

TKSS was presented the School Excellence Award in 2007 and 2011.

== Culture ==
=== Crest ===
Scientist and artist Leonardo da Vinci is featured on the school crest depicting an 'all-round' education. The bird and the flying machine on the crest represent a desire to go beyond the realms of ordinary education.

=== Houses ===
The four houses, named after Albert Einstein, Leonardo da Vinci, Rabindranath Tagore, and Ernest Rutherford, are represented by the colours red, purple, blue and yellow respectively.

Year 1 students are sorted into houses by class. The results from inter-house sports and academic competitions are summed up in a yearly points system. House allocations used to be student-based, instead of class-based. However, since 2020, there are no longer houses in TK.

=== Uniform ===
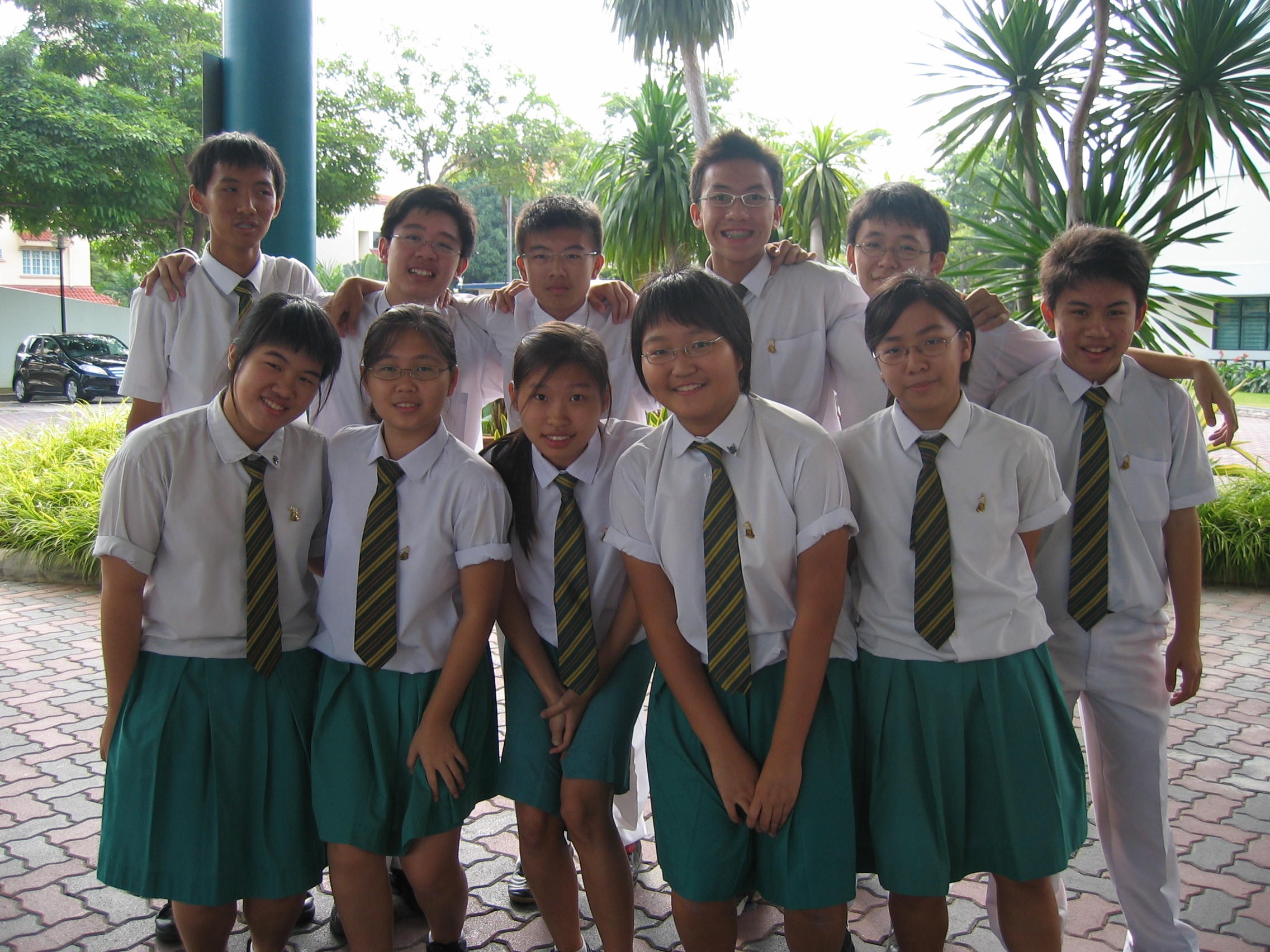
TK uniform (2005)

Boys wear white short-sleeved shirts with a school badge on the breast pocket. Lower Secondary boys wear white short trousers. Upper Secondary boys wear long white trousers. Girls wear a short-sleeved blouse with the school badge on the left. The skirt is jade-green with box pleats. A green and yellow striped tie is worn on some occasions.

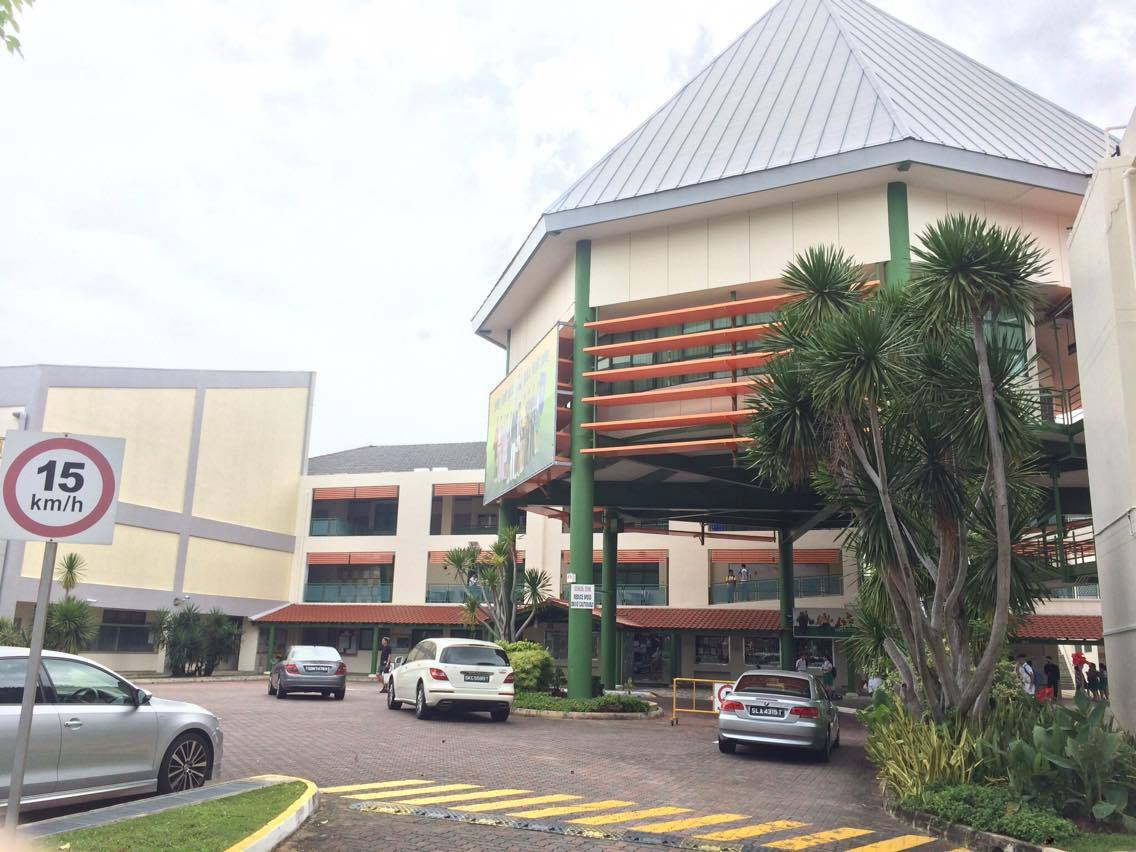
The current building of Tanjong Katong Secondary School (year 2017)

== Student life ==
=== Leadership Development Opportunities ===
A select 15 PHL students will form the panel of the CCM Grant, a programme by the National Youth Council. As the CCM Panelists, they will be assessing community service project grant applications supported by their peers. Year 4 PHL students will attend an annual mass training on Effective Communication and Presentation Skills.

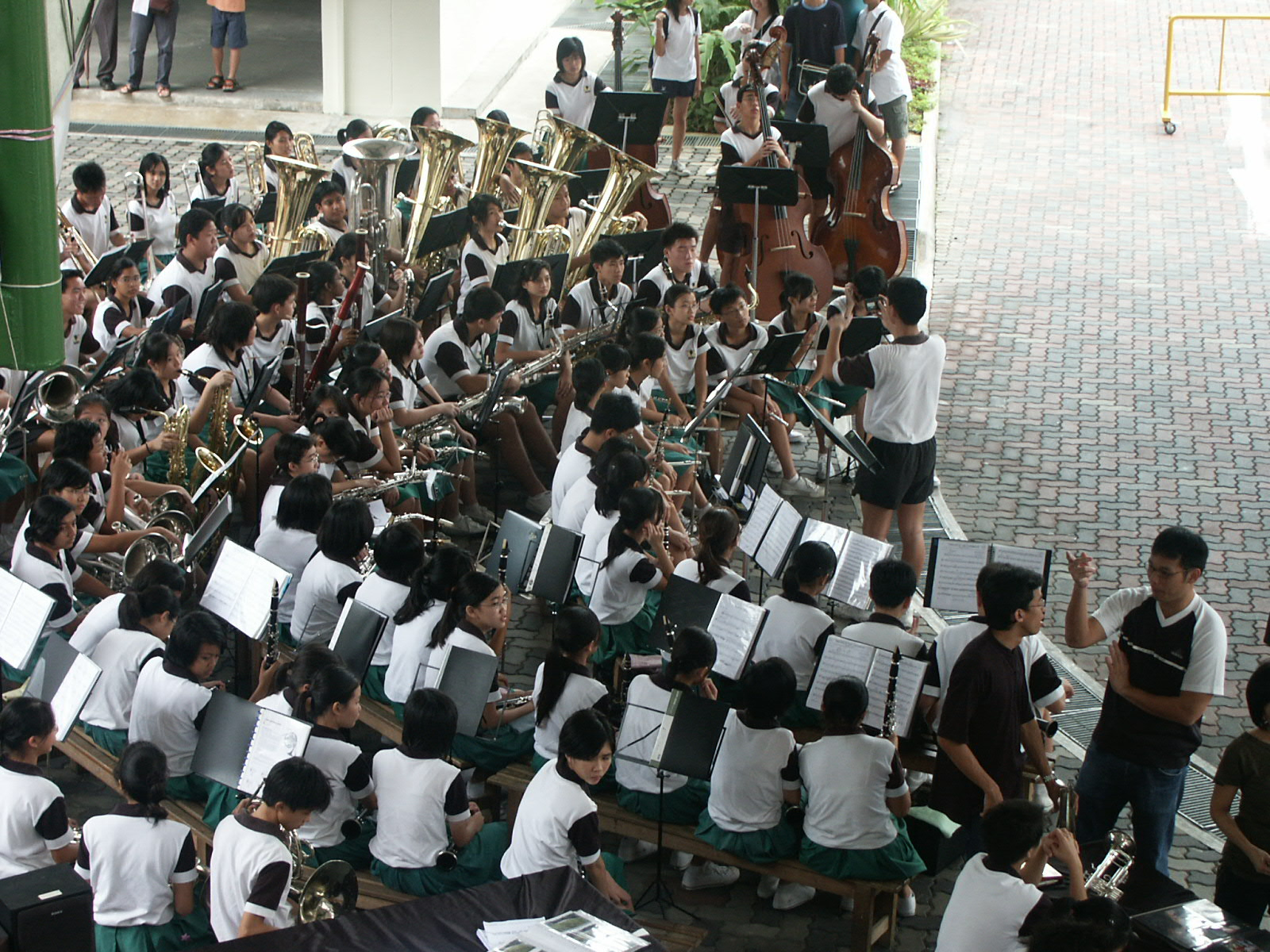
Band practice

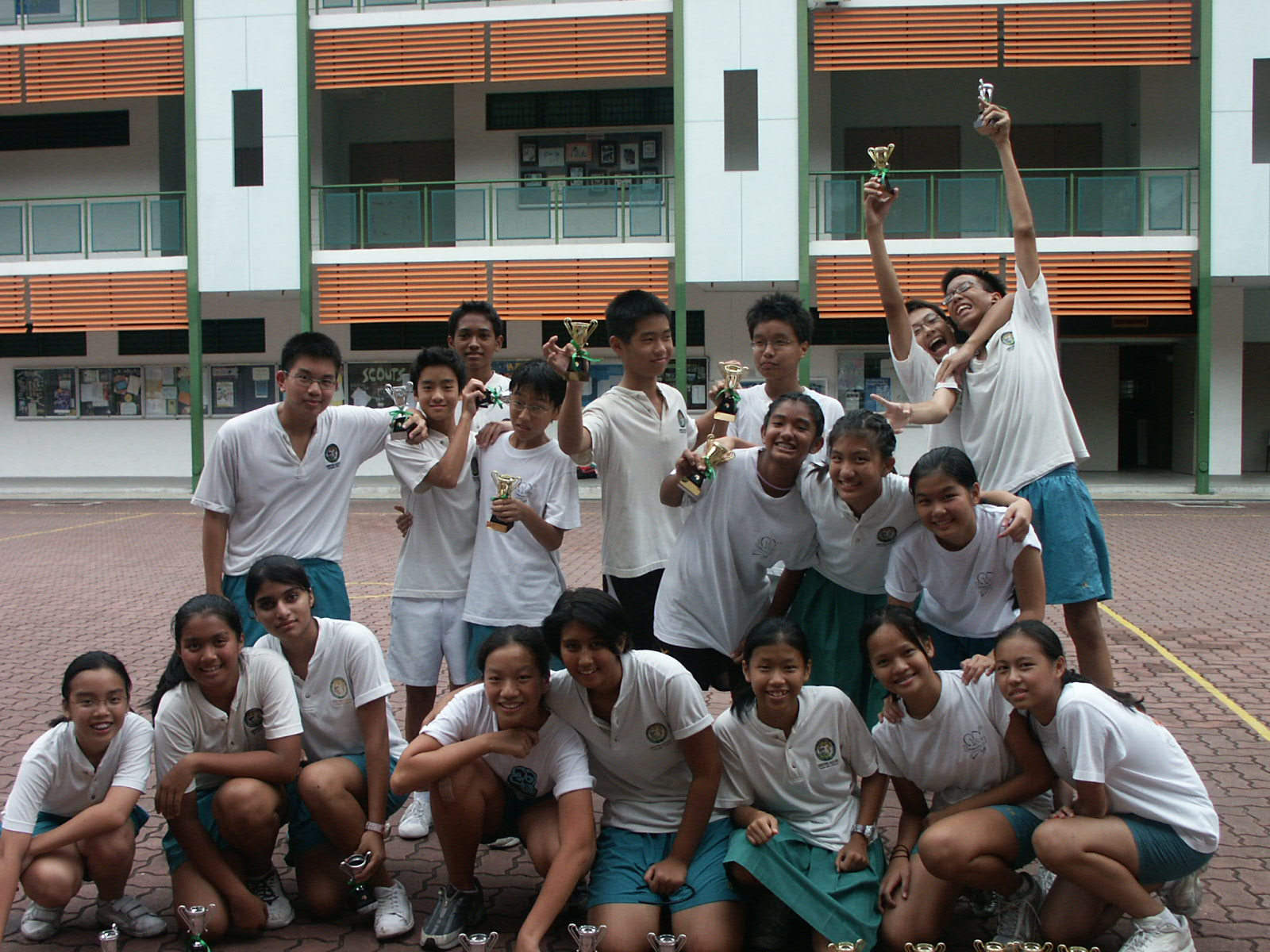
An inter-class sports event

==== Tanjong Katong Band ====
The TK Band has its roots in the school bands of the former Tanjong Katong Technical School and Tanjong Katong Girls' School. The bands started separately in 1965 with only 26 members. In 1967, the two bands came together for a combined performance that marked their long relationship. The band split again in 1989, with TKGS going its own way. Since established, it has represented the republic in several overseas events and International Bands' festivals. In 1998, the band was invited to put up a solo performance in the National Day Parade (NDP), the first ever for any school band. It also appeared on National Day Parades 2002, 2004 (during the pre-parade segments in both years), NDP 2012, Chingay Parades, etc., in solo performances. In 2014, TK Band was invited to play at the Taoyuan Band Festival in Taiwan (Republic of China). TK Band was also invited to play at the Singapore Youth Festival Opening Ceremony 2014 held at Gardens by the Bay. After 2 years of no school performers TK Band was invited to perform at NDP 2022 as an opening act titled "GO LIVE"

==== Other ====
The school also has a choir that in 2011, as part of the annual Jubilate Festival of Choirs, participated in a choral exam by the London College of Music. In 2014, TK Choir took part in Asia Cantate in Hong Kong.

== Notable alumni ==
=== Politics and government ===
- Lawrence Wong – Prime Minister of Singapore, Minister of Finance, and Member of Parliament for Marsiling–Yew Tee GRC
- Yaacob Ibrahim – former Cabinet Minister and former Member of Parliament
- Ng Shi Xuan, Member of Parliament for Sembawang GRC
- David Ong – former Member of Parliament
- Nicole Seah – Singaporean politician
- Cheong Quee Wah - former Permanent Secretary
- Kishore Mahbubani – former Singaporean diplomat
- Abdul Muhaimin: Workers' Party MP for Sengkang GRC

=== Academia ===
- Chua Beng Huat – Singaporean sociologist
- Subaraj Rajathurai - Singaporean wildlife specialist

=== Arts ===
- Jack Neo – Singaporean film director
- Nora Samosir - Singaporean theatre practitioner
- Kym Ng – Singaporean actress
- Haresh Sharma – Singaporean playwright
- Bryan Wong – Singaporean actor
- Race Wong – Singaporean singer, 2R
- Rosanne Wong – Singaporean singer, 2R
- Tommy Wong – Singaporean actor

=== Sports ===
- Lim Tong Hai – Singaporean professional footballer
- Amanda Mak – Singaporean Shooter, Youth Olympian (2018), SEA Games Gold Medallist in Hanoi 2021
