= Dancing Lion =

2007 Hong Kong film by Francis Ng

- DVD cover
- Traditional Chinese: 醒獅
- Simplified Chinese: 醒狮
- Hanyu Pinyin: Xǐng Shī
- Jyutping: Sing2 Si1
- Directed by: Francis Ng; Marco Mak
- Written by: Lam Chiu-wing; Lau Ka-ming
- Produced by: Ng Kin-hung
- Starring: Francis Ng; Anthony Wong; Teresa Mo; Lam Chi-chung; Lin Yuan; Hins Cheung
- Cinematography: Herman Yau; Dick Tung
- Edited by: Azrael Chung
- Music by: Marco Wan
- Production companies: Big Picture Ltd. Mandarin Films Distribution Co. Ltd. Local Production Ltd.
- Distributed by: Mei Ah Entertainment
- Release date: 26 April 2007
- Running time: 95 minutes
- Country: Hong Kong
- Language: Cantonese

Dancing Lion (Chinese: 醒獅) is a 2007 Hong Kong comedy film directed by and starring Francis Ng. It was co-directed by Marco Mak and co-stars Anthony Wong, Teresa Mo, Lam Chi-chung, Lin Yuan and Hins Cheung.

== Cast ==
Cast	Role
Francis Ng	Fai
Anthony Wong	Uncle Keung
Teresa Mo	Sam Mui/Chan
Lam Chi-chung	Nine
Lin Yuan	Pik
Hins Cheung	Cheung
Lam Suet	shopkeeper
Ronald Cheng	lion dancer
Kristal Tin	
Sammy Leung	lion dancer
Chin Kar-lok	TV producer
Lam Chiu-wing	
Wang Dongfang	
Wilfred Lau	
Yan Ng	
Oscar Siu	
Don Li	
Deep Ng	
Monie Tung
Race Wong	
Rosanne Wong	
Oscar Leung	
Hui Sze-man	cleaning lady
Raymond Wong	party guest

== Reception ==
A reviewer for LoveHKFilms wrote: "Ng has always been a bit of an oddball, in both his acting and filmmaking choices, and popular appeal has never seemed to be a factor in his previous directorial efforts. Ng and co-director Mak manage to make Dancing Lion fun and even smart, and neatly sidestep any issues of narrative deficiency by simply ignoring them. In the end, this is one for the local cinema fans - and by that, we mean the people who like the actors, love the city, and can actually speak the language." The film was called a "funny but chaotic comedy" on Criticker.
