= Bobo Chan =

Hong Kong former singer, actress and model

- 陳文媛
- Born: 18 September 1979 (age 46); British Hong Kong
- Occupations: Singer; actress; model; entrepreneur
- Years active: 1999–2008
- Spouse: Unknown (m. 2016)
- Children: 1
- Musical career
- Genres: Pop
- Instrument: Vocals

Chinese name
- Traditional Chinese: 陳文媛
- Simplified Chinese: 陈文媛
Transcriptions
Standard Mandarin
- Hanyu Pinyin: chen2 wen2 yuan2
Yue: Cantonese
- Jyutping: can4 man4 jyun6

Bobo Chan Man-woon (Chinese: 陳文媛, born 18 September 1979) is a former Hong Kong singer, actress, and model. She was active in both film and television and is known for her Cantopop releases.

== Life and career ==
=== 1999–2002: Early acting and singing debut ===
Bobo Chan made her first film appearance in 1999 with the movie Tempting Heart. In 2001, she debuted as a singer with her first album Shine. Between 2002 and 2003, she continued acting in films while building her Cantopop career with albums including Bounce (2002) and Graceful (2002).

=== 2003–2005: Limited TVB career ===
In 2003, Bobo Chan joined TVB on a limited project basis, appearing in several youth and romance-oriented television dramas, such as Hearts Of Fencing (2002) and Aqua Heroes (2003). Her TVB tenure lasted until 2005, during which she appeared in four major series. She did not sign a long-term management contract, instead working on a per-project basis.

=== 2006–2008: Photo scandal and end of career ===
After TVB, Bobo gradually reduced her acting engagements. In 2008, explicit photos involving Chan and Edison Chen were leaked online as part of the Edison Chen photo scandal. The scandal severely affected her public image, ended product endorsements, and caused her to withdraw from the entertainment industry. She temporarily relocated to the United States to avoid media scrutiny. Unlike other celebrities involved in the scandal, Bobo chose not to repair her career, permanently retiring from entertainment.

=== 2009–present: Retirement and entrepreneurship ===
In 2009, Bobo officially retired and focused on business ventures, opening a crystal gem boutique, Crystal Jamming, in North Point, Hong Kong.

Bobo married a fellow member of her church on 26 November 2016 in To Kwa Wan and gave birth to a daughter in 2019. She maintains a private, low-profile family life.

== Discography ==
- Shine (2001)
- Bounce (2002)
- Graceful (2002)
- BoBo Chan – Phase 1 The Retrospect (2003)
- Fantasia (2005)

== Filmography ==
=== Films ===
Year	Title	Role
1999	Tempting Heart	
2000	I Do	
2001	Shadow	
2002	Women from Mars	Cameo
2003	The Park	
2005	It Had to Be You!	
2006	Cocktail	

=== Television dramas ===
Year	Title	Role	Network
2002	Hearts Of Fencing	Chan Siu Man	TVB
2003	Aqua Heroes	Siu Man	TVB
2004	Sunshine Heartbeat	Yeung Siu Lam	TVB
2005	The Gâteau Affairs	BoBo	TVB
