= TKSS =

TKSS is an initialism which may refer to:

- The Kapil Sharma Show, a Hindi stand up comedy and talk show
- Tanjong Katong Secondary School, a school in Katong, Singapore
