= Don Li =

- Born: Don Li (李威樂); 25 January 1982 (age 44); Hong Kong
- Occupations: Singer; actor
- Years active: 2005–present

Chinese name
Transcriptions
Standard Mandarin
- Hanyu Pinyin: li3 yi4 lang3
Yue: Cantonese
- Jyutping: lei5 jat6 long5
- Musical career
- Also known as: Don Li Yat-Long (李逸朗)
- Origin: Hong Kong
- Genre: Cantopop
- Label: Emperor Entertainment Group
- Website: eegmusic.com/artists/details

Don Li Yat-long (Chinese: 李日朗; born 25 January 1982) is a Hong Kong singer and actor of the Emperor Entertainment Group, Music Icon Records. Don Li was a finalist in Talent Show 2002 in Hong Kong. In 2003, he began his career in the entertainment industry by acting in television series. In 2005, Li and Mandy Chiang began their music careers as a duet couple. In January 2007, Chiang announced that she and Li will both continue their music careers as solo artists.

Since 2009, the Hong Kong singer/actor has been actively pursuing an acting career in the Mainland, with a recent television idol drama hit Zhang Xiao Wu De Chun Tian (张小五的春天). On 14 July 2010, Don released his much anticipated new Mandarin EP titled For My Dearest, in which Don has personally involved in much of the production of this new album, from selection of songs and style, to cover design and music video direction. This EP features five songs of single-word titles elucidating the different stages of a romantic relationship, infatuation, separation, reunion, and finally enlightenment. The EP also includes a bonus DVD containing three music videos, one of which features Vincy Chan and Yumiko Cheng.

== Filmography ==
=== Television series ===
- Hearts Of Fencing (2003)
- A Handful Of Love (2004)
- Sunshine Heartbeat (2004)
- Ten Brothers (2005)
- Da Tang Nü Xun An (2011)
- Elite Brigade III (2015)

=== Film ===
- Dating Death (失驚無神) (2004)
- Moments of Love (擁抱每一刻花火) (2005)
- Yarudora (心跳季節) (2005)
- Rob-B-Hood (寶貝計劃) (2006)
- The Haunted School (校墓處) (2007)
- Dancing Lion (醒狮) (2007)
- Whispers and Moans (性工作者十日談) (2007)
- Bloody Doll (2014)
- Little Big Master (五個小孩的校長) (2015)
- Port of Call (踏血尋梅) (2015)
- We Are Legends (2019)
- Iron Wall Fist (2019)

== Discography ==
- Don Li – The Single (2003)
- Don & Mandy (2005)
- Don & Mandy – Rainy Lover (2006)
- Don & Mandy – Winter Lover (2006)
- Don Li – 李威樂 (2007)
- Don Li – For My Dearest (2010)

CD
01. 倆
02. 零
03. 誰
04. 悟
05. 快
06. 誰 (粵語)
DVD
01. 零
02. 誰
03. 倆

=== Soundtrack appearances ===
The Winter Melon Tale (TVB)-Chris Lai and Don Li (2009)
