= Always Be the Winners =

1994 Hong Kong film by Jacky Pang

- VCD cover
- Traditional Chinese: 神龍賭聖之旗開得勝
- Simplified Chinese: 神龙赌圣之旗开得胜
- Hanyu Pinyin: Shénlóng Dǔshèng Zhī Qíkāi Déshèng
- Jyutping: San4 Lung4 Dou2 Sing3 Zi1 Kei4 Hoi1 Dak1 Sing3
- Directed by: Jacky Pang
- Written by: John Chan
- Produced by: Stephen Lo
- Starring: Tony Leung Chiu-Wai; Tony Leung Ka-fai; Eric Tsang; Sandra Ng; Ekin Cheng; Charine Chan
- Cinematography: Chan Yuen-kai
- Edited by: Hai Kit-wai
- Music by: Lowell Lo
- Production companies: Ying Ji Wai; Regal Films
- Distributed by: Regal Film Distributions
- Release date: 9 February 1994
- Running time: 97 minutes
- Country: Hong Kong
- Language: Cantonese
- Box office: HK$14,094,286

Always Be the Winners is a 1994 Hong Kong comedy film directed by Jacky Pang and starring Tony Leung Chiu-Wai, Tony Leung Ka-fai, Eric Tsang, Sandra Ng, Ekin Cheng and Charine Chan. The film was released during the Chinese New Year period of 1994 to celebrate the holidays.

== Plot ==
Third Master Sha (Tony Leung Chiu-Wai) is a descendant of a powerful gambling family who must battle Yam Tin-sau (Ekin Cheng), the descendant of the rival gambling family to save his family's name. In order to win, Hui hires the China King of Gamblers Hui Man-lung (Tony Leung Ka-fai) for help.

== Cast ==
- Tony Leung Chiu-Wai as Third Master Sha
- Tony Leung Ka-fai as Hui Man-lung, the China King of Gamblers
- Eric Tsang as Nanny
- Sandra Ng as Mrs. Lulu Sha
- Ekin Cheng as Yam Tin-sau
- Charine Chan as Sha's third sister
- Au Gan as Sha's second sister
- Teresa Mak as Scarlet Pimpernel
- Lo Hung as Nightclub patron
- Keni Tanigaki as Photographer

== See also ==
- Ekin Cheng filmography
