= The Conman =

1998 Hong Kong film by Wong Jing

- Film poster

Chinese name
- Traditional Chinese: 賭俠1999
- Simplified Chinese: 赌侠1999
Transcriptions
Standard Mandarin
- Hanyu Pinyin: Dǔ Xiá Yī Jiǔ Jiǔ Jiǔ
Yue: Cantonese
- Jyutping: Dou2 Hap6 Jat1 Gau2 Gau2 Gau2
- Directed by: Wong Jing
- Written by: Wong Jing
- Produced by: Wong Jing
- Starring: Andy Lau; Athena Chu; Nick Cheung; Waise Lee; Jack Kao; Angie Cheung; Emotion Cheung; Bonnie Law
- Cinematography: Ko Chiu-lam
- Edited by: Marco Mak
- Music by: Lincoln Lo
- Production companies: Win's Entertainment; BoB and Partners
- Distributed by: China Star
- Release date: 18 December 1998
- Running time: 112 minutes
- Country: Hong Kong
- Language: Cantonese
- Box office: HK$17,369,190

The Conman is a 1998 Hong Kong action comedy film directed by Wong Jing and starring Andy Lau, Athena Chu and Nick Cheung. Despite the Chinese title, which translates as Knight of Gamblers 1999, Andy Lau does not reprise his role as the "Knight of Gamblers" from the God of Gamblers series, which was also directed by Wong Jing. The film was followed by a sequel, The Conmen in Vegas, in which Lau and Cheung return with new cast members Natalis Chan, Kelly Lin, Meggie Yu and Alex Man.

== Plot ==
When King stays overnight at his mistress' place, his pregnant wife Fanny discovers them and Fanny sadly leaves King. One time King and his assistant, Chung, were gambling cards with Chimney and Chimney finds out that they were secretly videotaping him, they start to fight. King kills Chimney with a knife in self-defense, and himself is left colorblind. While in prison for the manslaughter, King learns horse racing skills.

Five years later King is released from prison, and a small-time gambler, Dragon, who always worshipped King, greets him when King's friend Uncle Leng tells Dragon to pick him up. King and Dragon become partners and make money together from horse racing. King also meets Dragon's younger sister, Ching. King discovers that Ching's fiancé, Raymond, is a swindler who lies about going to college in the United States, and cheats women out of their money. With help from Dragon and Rocky (whom King beat in billiards, and is later mentored by King), King stages a plan where they make Raymond think that he killed King forcing him to flee to Cambodia. After King helps Ching, he wins her love.

At the same time, King is also looking for Fanny and his son. One day Rocky brings King to Macau Mon's gambling cruise boat and King is recognized by Handsome, who is Chimney's younger brother. On the boat, King also sees Chung, who lied to him by saying that after he went to prison, Fanny committed suicide by jumping off a building. When King finds Chung's residence, he finds out that after he went to prison, Fanny was taken care by Chung and his son Little King now lives with Chung.

Later, when King is playing with his son, they encounter Handsome, who is seeking revenge and causes Little King to be injured and hospitalized. Handsome also kidnaps Fanny and Chung and blackmails King to help him get rid of his own boss Macau Mon. Macau Mon has invested a large number of stakes bet on the 1998 FIFA World Cup for the French team to win, and as long as they can create an image of the Brazilian Team winning during the time when several experts are gambling with cards, it will give Macau Mon a heart attack and allow Handsome to replace his medicine with poisoned water.

After suffering from a big blow, King becomes depressed but is consoled by Ching. In order to save Fanny and Chung, King and Dragon hire an adult film director, Squirrel, to film some fake footage of the World Cup. After completing this, King decides to fulfill Ching's wish of traveling to Europe together and meets her at the bus station the next day.

On the night of the World Cup final, King, Handsome, Winning Gary and Macau Mon are gambling cards while watching the live broadcast of the World Cup in which they bet on (King bets on Brazil while Macau Mon bets on France). At the same time on the other side, in order to create a false game screen performance of the horse cross to stimulate Macau Mon, they take the footage filmed by Squirrel which features anchor Lam Seung-wai and Dragon pretending as Ronaldo and other players to intersperse with the real broadcast. In the end, Brazil wins three to two against France, but in reality, France wins 3–0 against Brazil. After seeing this, Macau Mon suffers from a heart attack and dies.

Just when Handsome thinks Macau Mon's casino belongs to him and is ready to get rid of King, Macau Mon unexpectedly stands behind him and points a gun at him. It turns out that during the card game, King gave a two of spades card to Macau Mon telling him the water is poisoned in order to help him. Macau Mon shoots and kills Handsome.

In the end, King goes to the bus station the next morning to wait for Ching but King was unexpectedly run over by Dragon who was in a hurry.

== Cast ==
- Andy Lau as King
- Athena Chu as Ching
- Nick Cheung as Dragon
- Waise Lee as Handsome
- Jack Kao as Macau Mon
- Angie Cheung as Fanny
- Emotion Cheung as Chung
- Bonnie Law as King's mistress
- Lee Siu-kei as Winner Gary
- Frankie Ng as Rocky
- Karel Wong as Eastwood
- Ben Ng as Bad Temper / Chimney
- Wong Jing as Squirrel
- Lam Sheung Yee as Lam Seung-wai
- Alan Man as Raymond Chou
- Yeung Kin-wai as Angela
- Wong Kam-tong as Uncle Leng
- Aman Chang as man in toilet
- John Cheung as cop
- Gary Mak as cruise gambler
- Johnny Cheung as Bad Temper's gangster
- So Wai-nam as Bad Temper's gangster
- Eddie Che as Handsome's gangster
- Vincent Chik as Handsome's gangster
- Chow Man-sing as Handsome's gangster
- Tam Tin-po as woman in advertisement
- Yu Ka-ho

== Box office ==
The film grossed HK$17,369,190 at the Hong Kong box office during its theatrical run from 18 December 1998 to 19 January 1999 in Hong Kong.

== Award nominations ==
- 18th Hong Kong Film Awards
  - Nominated: Best Supporting Actor (Nick Cheung)

== See also ==
- Andy Lau filmography
- Wong Jing filmography
