= Tommy Wong =

Singaporean actor (born 1986)

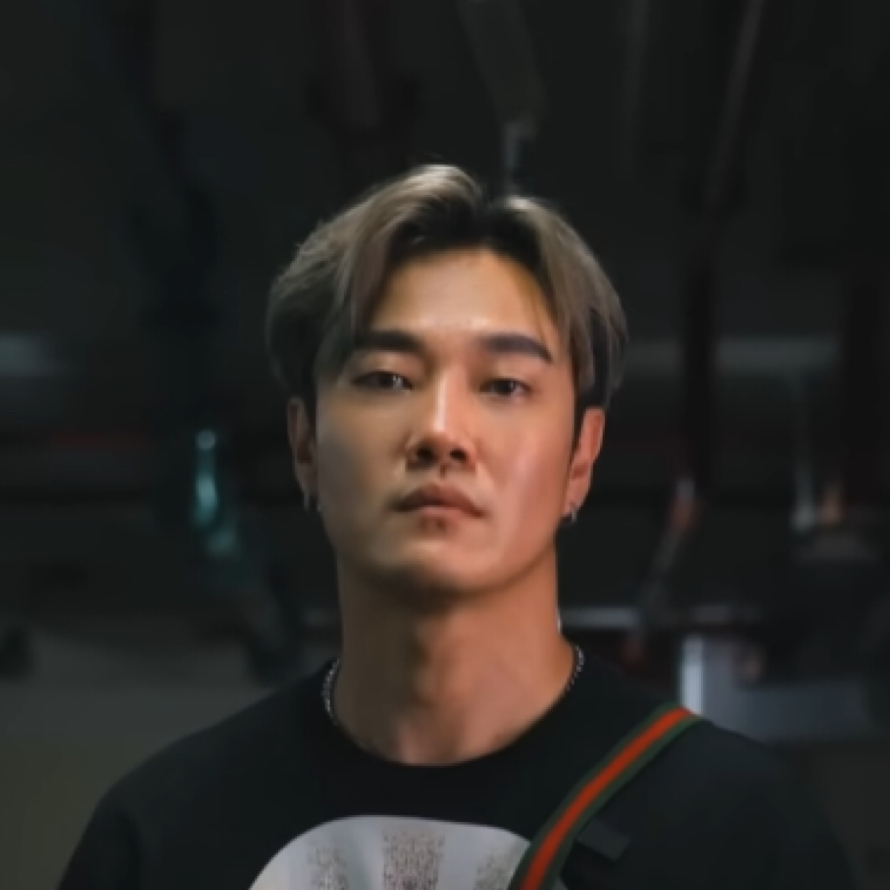
- Born: 3 May 1986 (age 40); Singapore
- Education: Tanjong Katong Secondary School
- Alma mater: University of Queensland
- Occupations: Actor; Content Creator; Businessman
- Years active: 2021–present
- Spouse: Unknown (m. 2018)
- Children: 2

Chinese name
- Simplified Chinese: 黄立晖
- Hanyu Pinyin: Huáng Lì Huī

Tommy Wong (born 3 May 1986), also commonly known as tommynbcb, is a Singaporean actor. He is also recognized as the founder of a Singaporean burger chain Nothing But Cheeseburger (NBCB), and an influencer. He starred in the 2026 Chinese New Year Movie "3 Good Guys" which topped its opening weekend.

== Education ==
Wong attended Red Swastika School, Tanjong Katong Secondary School and pursued a Bachelor of Business in Accounting at the University of Queensland after National Service. He completed his degree in 2012.

== Career ==
After completing his studies, Wong returned to Singapore and started his career in banking and insurance.

In 2021, Wong started his home based business Nothing But Cheese Burgers (NBCB) during the COVID-19 pandemic in Singapore. In 2022, he turned his homebased business into a restaurant at Orchard Central. He started using TikTok as a way to market his restaurant and soon explored different content such as skits and POV videos. He gained more popularity from his viral "Asian Daddy" skit series and was soon cast in projects such as Mediacorp's Mediacorp 5 long form drama Provocative where he played the character Tiger Sam.

Wong made his film debut with Money No Enough 3. He made a guest appearance in Hi Noel. In June 2025, it was announced that Wong was cast for a leading role in the 2026 Chinese New Year film 3 Good Guys, which went on to hit top spot on its opening day and weekend.

On 14 August 2026, it was reveal that Wong stars in his second Channel 5 long form drama Yes Captain! as Inmate Chan where he delved deep into the character by speaking to ex inmates to prepare himself for the role who is incarcerated for gang related activities.

== Personal life ==
Wong is the only child. In 2024, Wong has revealed that his mother is suffering from dementia and the effect it has on elderly caretakers.

Wong is married with 2 sons.

Wong is involved in social causes such as Singapore Kindness Movement, Central Narcotics Bureau's Drug Victims Remembrance Day and championing progressive wages.

On 8 June 2024, Wong appeared in a "Refresh PAP" event, resulting in some chatter online about his involvement in politics.

== Filmography ==
=== Television series ===
Year	Title	Role	Notes	Ref.
2025	Provocative	Tiger Sam		
2026	Yes Captain!	Chan		

=== Film ===
Year	Title	Role	Notes	Ref.
2024	Money No Enough 3	-	Supporting	
2024	Hi Noel	Loanshark	Guest Appearance	
2025	Follow Aunty La	Police Officer		
2026	3 Good Guys	Mike		
