= Cocktail (2006 film) =

2006 Hong Kong film by Herman Yau

- Film poster

Chinese name
- Traditional Chinese: 半醉人間
- Simplified Chinese: 半醉人间
Transcriptions
Standard Mandarin
- Hanyu Pinyin: Bànzuì rénjiān
Yue: Cantonese
- Jyutping: Bun3zeoi3 jan4gaan1
- Directed by: Long Ching; Herman Yau
- Written by: Cheung Fan
- Produced by: Ng Kin-Hung
- Starring: Race Wong; Candy Lo
- Cinematography: Lam Wah-Chuen; Mak Hoi-Man
- Edited by: Chung Wai-Chiu
- Music by: Mak Chun Hung
- Production company: Century Creator Co. Ltd.
- Release date: 19 January 2006
- Running time: 90 minutes
- Country: Hong Kong
- Language: Cantonese

Cocktail is a 2006 Hong Kong film produced and directed by Herman Yau and Long Ching. The film stars Candy Lo, Endy Chow, and Race Wong.

== Plot ==
Candy, a thoughtful and introspective character, owns the trendy Hong Kong bar Half Mortal. She hires Paul as a bartender, and her part-time employee Stella, a psychology student, begins to train him. Paul has a unique talent for mixing drinks that match his customers' emotional states.

He comes from a troubled background and is grieving the recent death of his alcoholic father. Having dropped out of school, Paul is also inexperienced with women. He has fallen in love with Stella but struggles to express himself around her.

He ponders whether alcohol can bring happiness or, as Stella believes, simply alters how people act.

== Cast ==
- Candy Lo as Candy
- Endy Chow as Paul
- Race Wong as Stella
- Bobo Chan as Macy
- Lawrence Cheng as Yip Chi-feng
- Chiu Suet-Fei as Yuki (credited as Suet-fei)
- Eric Kot as Tong
- Amanda Lee
- Johnson Lee as John
- Anson Leung as Yat (credited as Chun-yat Leung)
- Peng Wai-On (credited as Eddie Peng)
- Ellis Tang as Hong (credited as Siu-yan Tang)
- Patrick Tang
- Kwok Cheung Tsang as Kuen
- Monie Tung as Fei
- Otto Wang as guest

== Analysis ==
According to a Hong Kong Film Critics Society review, the film's message whether made deliberately or not is "the drunken world is good, but the sober real world is not necessarily bad". The South China Morning Post called the film "a mild melodrama about the romances of urban twentysomethings" and a "dramatic comed[y] aimed at teens".

== Reception ==
In a Hong Kong Film Critics Society review, the film critic wrote, "As for Cocktail, although the content is relatively cliché and some scenes are a bit sensational, regarding the part of it dealing with the relationship between father and son, I personally think it is better than After This Our Exile."
