= Yan Ng =

Hong Kong actress and singer

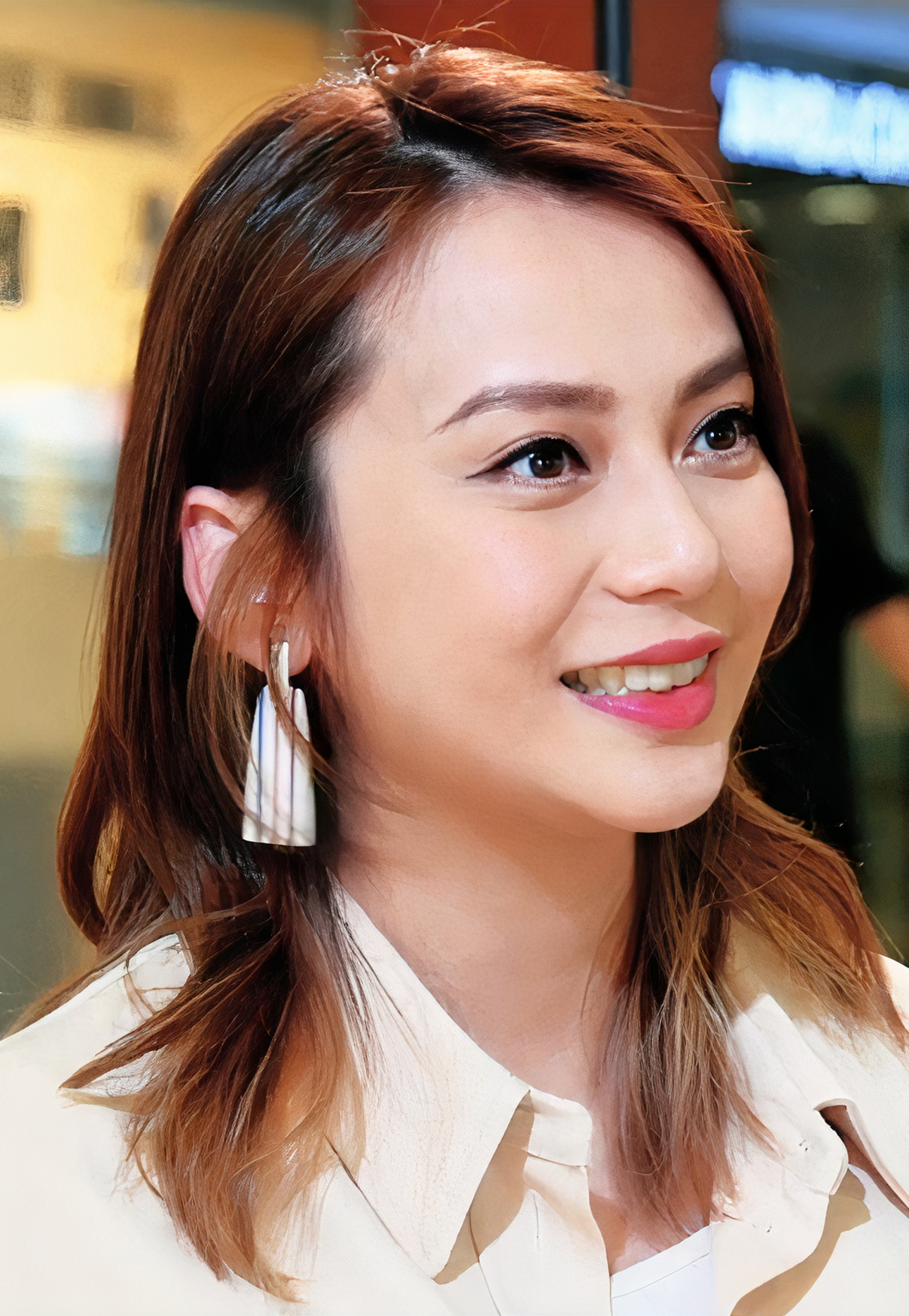
Yan Ng

Yan Ng Yat-Yin (Chinese: 吳日言) (born 25 November 1983) is a Hong Kong Cantopop singer and actress.

== Filmography ==
- My Sweetie (2004)
- Moments of Love (2005)
- The Unusual Youth (2005)
- It Had to Be You! (2005)
- AV (2005)
- Crazy n' the City (2005)
- Whispers and Moans (2007)
- Dancing Lion (2007)
- Naraka 19 (2007)
- Love Is Elsewhere (2008)
- Hidden Faces (2015)
- Happiness (2016)
