= Athena Chu =

Hong Kong actress (born 1971)

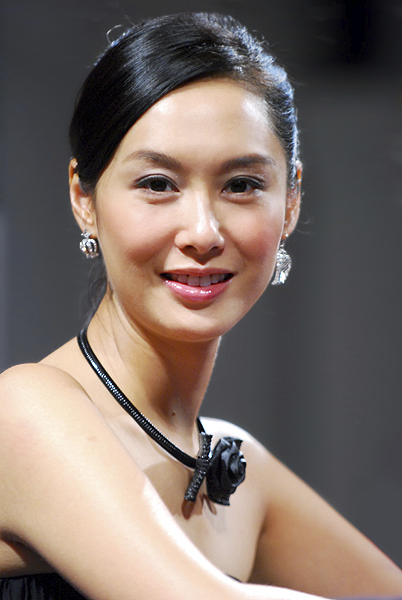
- Chu in 2008
- Born: Chu Yan; 25 October 1971 (age 54); British Hong Kong
- Occupations: Actress; singer
- Years active: 1992–present
- Spouse: Paul Wong (m. 2012)
- Children: 1

Chinese name
- Chinese: 朱茵
- Hanyu Pinyin: Zhū Yīn
- Jyutping: Zyu1 Jan1

Athena Chu (born Chu Yan; 25 October 1971) is a Hong Kong actress and singer. She is best known for her role as Zixia Fairy in A Chinese Odyssey (1995).

== Early life and education ==
Chu was born in Kowloon on 25 October 1971. Her father was a mathematics teacher who later started a business with her mother.

Chu attended The Hong Kong Academy for Performing Arts from 1990 to 1992, during which she hosted children's shows on the television station TVB.

== Career ==
After graduating in 1992, Chu made her film debut in Fight Back to School II (1992), which earned her a nomination at the Hong Kong Film Award for Best New Performer. Chu started to attract public attention with her interpretation of Huang Rong in the remake of Wuxia drama The Legend of the Condor Heroes (1994).

Chu worked again with Stephen Chow in A Chinese Odyssey (1995). The role of Zi Xia (also known as Daisy Fairy) shot Chu to widespread fame in Hong Kong and parts of Asia. Another one of Chu's most notable films is The Boss Up There (1999). Her portrayal of a drug addict who finds God earned her a nomination for Best Actress at the Golden Horse Film Awards.

Regarded by many as a sex symbol, Chu has generally been cast in flower vase roles. She even made two appearances in Wong Jing’s Raped by an Angel series. However, her role in Whispers and Moans (2007) won her recognition, despite not being nominated for any award.

Chu was the first Hong Kong actress to be nominated at the International Emmy Award for Best Actress, for her role as a disabled but inspirational women who overcomes all odds in the television series Wall-less World (2010).

After a five years hiatus from the entertainment industry since 2011, Chu announced her comeback in 2016 with three upcoming films.

== Personal life ==
Chu began dating singer and actor Paul Wong of Beyond in 1998, and married him in 2012. Chu and Wong have a daughter, Debbie (b. 2012).

== Filmography ==
Film
Year	Title	Chinese title	Role	Notes
1992	To Miss with Love	逃學外傳	Lai Man-si	
1992	Super Lady Cop	超级女警	Yoki	
1992	Fight Back to School II	逃學威龍2	Sandy	Nominated-12th Hong Kong Film Award for Best New Performer
1993	Once a Cop	超級計劃	Annie Lee	
1993	Taxi Hunter	的士判官	Yan	
1993	Tom, Dick and Hairy	風塵三俠	Pearl Chan	
1993	Vampire Family	一屋哨牙鬼	Chu Lee-mei	
1994	Lantern	燈籠	Fong	
1994	Easy Money	先洗未來錢	Sisi Li	
1995	Shaolin Kung Fu Kids	笑林老祖	Sister Lam	
1995	Trouble Maker	蠟筆小小生		
1995	Remember M, Remember E	那有一天不想你	Chui Ching	
1995	Cupid Love	七月俏佳人	Ching-ching	
1995	A Chinese Odyssey Part One: Pandora's Box	西遊記第壹佰零壹回之月光寶盒	Purple / Lin Zixia	
1995	A Chinese Odyssey Part Two: Cinderella	西遊記大結局之仙履奇緣	Lin Zixia	
1996	The Feeling of Love	重慶愛情感覺	Ah Yin	
1996	Hero of Swallow	神偷燕子李三	Chinny	
1997	Ah Fai the Dumb	天才與白痴	Man-man	
1998	Temptress of a Thousand Face	千面嬌娃	Sherry Wong	
1998	Tricky King	超級整蠱霸王	DKNY / Yandy	
1998	Step into the Dark	夜半無人屍語時	Faith Ching	
1998	Shanghai Affairs	新唐山大兄	Sin	
1998	The Love and Sex of the Eastern Hollywood	愛在娛樂圈的日子	Yue	
1998	Take Five	對不起，幹掉你		
1998	Raped by an Angel 2: The Uniform Fan	強姦2 制服誘惑	Po-man	
1998	The Conman	賭俠1999	Ching	
1999	The H.K. Triad	O記三合會檔案		
1999	The Boss Up There	生命楂Fit人	Fong Hei-tung	Nominated- 36th Golden Horse Award for Best Leading Actress
1999	Raped by an Angel 4: The Raper's Union	強姦終極篇之最後羔羊	Po-man	
1999	Horoscope 1: The Voice from Hell	生人勿近之問米	Jojo	
2000	Love Correction	緣份有Take 2	Emma Lau	
2000	Conman in Tokyo	中華賭俠	Karen	
2001	Stowaway	驚天大逃亡	Kam Lan	
2001	Never Say Goodbye	有人說愛我	Jean	
2002	Chinese Odyssey 2002	天下無雙	Amour Amour	guest star
2002	Time 4 Hope	二人三足	Cindy	
2003	Shiver	心寒	Sammi Mok Sum-yi	
2004	Sex and the Beauties	性感都市	Kwan Tak-han	
2004	Love Is a Many Stupid Thing	精裝追女仔2004	Chu Yan	guest star
2007	Whispers and Moans	性工作者十日談	Coco	
2010	Just Another Pandora's Box	越光寶盒	Purple Cloud	guest star
2010	The Aroma City	芳香之城傳奇	So Ling-fong	
2010	Let Love Come Back	讓愛回家	Ng Fan	
2011	Scary Market	嘿店	Hui Zi	
2017	Once Again	二次初恋	Ye Lan	
2018	The Lingering	古宅		
TBA	Ambans	驻藏大臣	Dawa Yingzong	

Television
Year	Title	Chinese title	Role	Network	Notes
1993	Romance Beyond	都市的童話	Ding Dang	TVB	
1993	The Chord to Victory	少年五虎	Yeung Suet-lai	TVB	
1993	The Legendary Ranger	原振俠	Wan-choi	TVB	
1993	The Edge of Righteousness	龍兄鼠弟 / 追日者	Suen Ho-ho	TVB	
1994	The Legend of the Condor Heroes	射鵰英雄傳	Wong Yung	TVB	
1997	Wars of Bribery	廉政行動組	Chiu Wing-yee	TVB	
1997	Tears in Heaven	蒼天有淚	Xiao Yujuan		
2000	The New Shaolin Temple	新少林寺	Princess Haotai		
2000	Kaixin Jiuhao	開心就好	Susie		
2000	The Duke of Mount Deer	小寶與康熙	A'ke / Chen Yuanyuan	TVB	
2002	Xiao Shiyilang	蕭十一郎	Shen Bijun	CTV	
2002	Palm of Ru Lai	如來神掌	Tu Xuehua / Sun Biyun / Sun Jinling	ATV	
2003	Nannü Zidian	男女字典	Kelly	PCCW	Network drama
2005	Eonian Hero	逐日英雄	Xiang Wanting		
2006	Fox Volant of the Snowy Mountain	雪山飛狐	Yuan Ziyi	ATV	
2007	Baoxue Lihua	暴雨梨花	Lu Huanong		
2008	Gorgeous Adventure	華麗冒險	Amy		
2008	Yiqian Di Yanlei	一千滴眼淚	Shen Xinyi		
2010	A World Without Walls	沒有牆的世界	Tai Mung	RTHK	television film, Nominated International Emmy Award for Best Actress
2011	Twin of Brothers	大唐雙龍傳之長生訣	Fu Junzhuo / Fu Junyu		

== Discography ==
Year	Title	Chinese Title
1996	Earthquake	地震
1997	Glass	玻璃
1998	Ti Ti Ta	踢踢踏
2002	Let's Jump	跳起来
2003	Possession	迷恋
2004	Attitude	
