= Monie Tung =

Hong Kong entertainer and actress

- Chinese: 董敏莉
- Born: 26 November 1980 (age 45); British Hong Kong
- Occupations: Actress; singer
- Years active: 2004–present
- Spouse: Zhuang Yaojin

Monie Tung (Chinese: 董敏莉; pinyin: Dǒng Mǐnlì; born 26 November 1980) is a Hong Kong film and television entertainer, programme host and stage actress.

== Early life ==
Tung started in the industry when she was 6 years old, appearing in the children's television show 430 Space Shuttle. She attended the Sheng Kung Hui Lam Woo Memorial Secondary School, and later graduated from the University of Hong Kong College of Arts (majoring in French literature).

== Career ==
In 2004 she began her entertainment career. Beginning as a singer, she released her debut album Monie Monie. She later became a film and television actress starring in many films of which her most significant works are My Mother Is a Belly Dancer and Whispers and Moans.

From 2013 onwards she hosted the entertainment programme Entertainment Flagship Store for the Metro Info, until the last episode on 8 January 2016.

== Personal life ==
Tung's husband is Zhuang Yaojin, a lawyer.

== Discography ==
=== Album ===
Album #	Album name	Album type	Publisher	Issue date	Tracks
1st	Monie Monie	AVCD	Go East Entertainment	23 Nov 2004	Computer Data; Diet Men and Women MV; Pool Party MV; Tourists MV; Wo Jiao Monie; Diet Men and Women; Pool Party; Tourists; I Asked Me; Jiu Ni; Non-no; Network Phase

=== Singles ===
Year	Title	Notes
2006	"Thank You"	

=== Send songs ===
Send highest list of four songs on the list
Record	Song	903	RTHK	997	TVB	Remarks
2004
Monie Monie	Diet Men and Women	10	-	-	-	
Monie Monie	Tourists	15	-	5	-	
Monie Monie	Pool Party	19	-	-	-	
Monie Monie	Jiù nǐ	16	-	-	-	

Total number of championship songs
903	RTHK	997	TVB	Remarks
0	0	0	0	Total number of four championship songs: 0

== Filmography ==
=== Films ===
Year	Title	Role	Notes	Ref.
2003	New Tie Sister			
2004	My Sweetie	Luo Sixi		
2005	Cocktail			
2005	A.V.			
2006	PG Parents' Guidance			
2006	Don'T Open Your Eyes			
2006	My Mother Is a Belly Dancer	Cherry		
2006	Confession of Pain			
2007	Whispers and Moans			
2007	Single Tribe	Meihua		
2007	Danger Counter			
2007	Love Is Not All Around	Mary		
2007	Good Morning in July		Independent film	
2008	City Without Baseball			
2008	True Women For Sale			
2009	You Long Play Phoenix			
2010	Hong Kong Confidential			
2015	Are You Here	Dong Zuer		
2015	Super Models			
2018	Mysterious Fighter Project A			
2018	Adieu			

=== Television dramas ===
Year	Title	Role	Notes
2004	Sunshine Heartbeat	Fang Min (Mon-mon)	
2005	When Dolphin Met Cat		
2006	Sogeum		
2006	Full House		Patrol
2006	Neighborhood III Ziyi Song		
2007	Tutor Queen	Lu Xiaoyu	
2008	Flaming Butterfly	Huoxin Si	
2010	F.S.D.		
2012	Extraordinary Engineering Dream		Decorated Liang Ying's mother (1967–72), high school and adult poet Liang Ying

=== Microfilms ===
Year	Title	Notes
2012	GoYeah.com Female Woman	Miss Highlighter; as Nai Zhen

== Advertising ==
=== Before entering the line ===
Product	Notes
Nokia cell phone	Print advert
Bank of China Why Not credit card	Print advert
Nestlé sweet tube	Print advert
Reebok product catalog	Print advert
Sony product catalog	Print advert
Genki Sushi	Print advert
Lavenus hair dye	Print advert
Day fountain distilled water	TV advert
Wan Chai dumplings queen	TV advert
Bank of China Why Not credit card	TV advert
KFC home chicken turntable	TV advert

=== After entering the line ===
Year	Product	Notes
2004	Lipton Chinese tea bag	Print and TV commercials
2006	Pizza Hut N found	TV advert
2012	Mask House Celebrity Gel Mask Series	Print advert

== Stage shows ==
Year	Title	Notes
2004	Senmei Small Opera Troupe Good Morning!	
2005	Triangular Relationship Troupe Happy Innocence	
2009	Triangular Relationship Troupe Twenty O'clock	
2010	Triangular Relationship Troupe Dear, Victoria	
2012	A2 Theater Boeing Valentine	Re-run

== Participating programmes ==
Year	Title
1986	430 Space Shuttle

== Television series ==
=== Metro Broadcast Corporation ===
Title	Notes
Entertainment Flagship Store	New City Information Desk every weekday, 16:00–17:00
Wo Zui Enjoy Bajiushi	Metro digital music station every Wednesday; 20:00–21:00
France, How Are You?	Metro digital music station every Sunday; 21:00–20:00

=== RTHK Teen Power ===
Year	Title	Notes
2004	Peninsula Ice Room I	Co-presented with Angela Au and Liu Haolong
2009	Taste Science	
2010	Taste Science II	

=== Hong Kong and Taiwan TV ===
Year	Title	Notes
2017	RTHK Talk Show: Speak Female Time	Guest host; co-presented with Skye Chan

=== Asian TV ===
Year	Title
2012	eCIA

=== Hong Kong Cable TV ===
Years	Title	Co-presenter
2008	Feng Shui Lecture of Master So Series Palm Piece	Peter So Man Fung
2008–09	High Master of Food and Food	Gao Rongxin
2009	High Master Food Legend	Gao Rongxin

=== ViuTV ===
Year	Title	Co-presenter
2016	Jiri Shangying	Chen Bingquan

== Programmes that participated as a guest ==
Year	Title	Notes
2009	Cooking Mother	
2012	Big Dragon Phoenix	Commercial Radio Hong Kong late night programme

== Music video appearances ==
Year	Artist	Song
2004	Wilfred Lau	"Old Man"
2005	Alex Lau	"North Wind"

== As a concert guest/performer ==
Year	Title
2004	Sam Hui Continued to Smile Concert guest
2005	10th Anniversary of the World Overtime Music Classic Concert
