= Love Kickoff =

- 南華夢飛翔
- Genre: Romantic drama, Teen
- Created by: Chin Kwok Wai
- Starring: Lee Ho; Dominic Ho; Ronald Law; Dada Lo; Liddy Li; Joey Law; Hsu Pei-yu; Benz Hui; Phoebe Chan; Coson Leung
- Opening theme: "Shining Friends" by Chan Kwong Wing
- Country of origin: Hong Kong
- Original language: Cantonese

Production
- Editor: Tsui Ka Cheung
- Running time: 120 minutes

Original release
- Network: TVB
- Release: 8 August 2009

Love Kickoff (南華夢飛翔) is a Hong Kong television film created by TVB in 2009. The movie revolves around several teenagers playing soccer, hoping for a chance to compete with the South China team. Love Kickoff is the fourth installment of the Four-Leaf Clover series, though the plot is unrelated to Hearts of Fencing, Sunshine Heartbeat, and Dressage To Win.

The series premiered on TVB Jade on 8 August 2009.

== Cast ==
- Dominic Ho as Goal
- Lee Ho as Jay
- Ronald Law as Wood
- Dada Lo as Monique (Big Mon)
- Liddy Li as Small Mon
- Joey Law as Alexander
- Hsu Pei-yu as Fiona
- Benz Hui as Ying Kwok-hung (Uncle Hung)
- Phoebe Chan as Ah So
- Phoebe Chan as Phoebe
- Coson Leung as Dick
- Robbie Keane as himself
- Kwok Wing Kiu as Cheerleader
- Yuri Chan as Cheerleader
- Kibby Lau as Cheerleader
- Rosella Lau as Cheerleader
- Janice Ting as Cheerleader
- Lukian Wang as Cheerleader

=== Guests ===
- Cecilia Fong as Jay's mother
- Yoyo Chen
- Charmaine Li
- Elaine Yiu
- Chris Lai
- Chan Chi Hong as himself, one of the South China players
- Lee Wai Lim as himself, one of the South China players
- Man Pei Tak as himself, one of the South China players
- Chan Siu Ki as himself, one of the South China players
- Au Yeung Yiu Chung as himself, one of the South China players
