= The Park (2003 film) =

2003 Hong Kong film by Andrew Lau

- Film poster
- Traditional Chinese: 咒樂園
- Simplified Chinese: 咒乐园
- Hanyu Pinyin: Zhòu Lè Yuán
- Jyutping: Zau3 Lok6 Jyun4
- Directed by: Andrew Lau
- Written by: Yiu Fai-lo; Wah-Shum-lung
- Produced by: Andrew Lau; John Chong; Lee Man-fai
- Starring: Laila Boonyasak; Bobo Chan
- Cinematography: Andrew Lau; Ng Man-ching
- Edited by: Danny Pang; Curran Pang
- Music by: Comfort Chan; Ken Chan
- Production companies: Base Production Ltd.; Mega Star Production Ltd.; Hype Films Co. Ltd.
- Release date: 23 October 2003
- Running time: 91 minutes
- Country: Hong Kong
- Language: Cantonese

The Park is a 2003 Hong Kong horror film originally released in 3-D. The film was directed and produced by Andrew Lau. The film was shown at the 2004 Sundance Film Festival as part of the midnight screenings.

== Plot ==
14 years ago, a girl fell to her death from the Ferris wheel in an amusement park and the park's owner hanged himself from the wheel in guilt. The park, which was allegedly built over a former cemetery, has since been closed. Alan, a reporter, explores the deserted park and mysteriously disappears. His sister, Yen, wants to enter the park to find him. Their mother, a ghostbuster who captures spirits with a magic camera, says she knows that Alan is dead and warns Yen not to search for him. However, Yen insists that Alan is still alive and goes to the park against her mother's will, bringing along six friends – Ka-ho, Dan, YY, Ken, Pinky, and Shan.

They meet the park's caretaker, a weird-looking old man, who warns them to leave, saying that the park is haunted. They ignore him and sneak into the park at night. Paranormal activities happen when they split up to find Alan. Ka-ho sees something on his camera recorder and follows it into the Haunted House.

One hour later, when everyone returns to the meeting point, they notice that Ka-ho is missing, so they split up to find him. Ken and Pinky take a ride on the carousel but it starts spinning at high speed on its own. Ken manages to jump off the carousel but accidentally knocks Pinky out. Shan is left behind with Pinky, while Ken runs away and almost dies from being drowned. His crucifix saves him but does not prevent him from being decapitated on a wire later. Pinky is possessed and dies after slitting her wrist. Shan is apparently killed after being strangled by the possessed Pinky but his lucky charm saves him. Yen, YY and Dan enter the Haunted House and the wax figures inside come to life and attack them. YY is killed by the figurines while Dan dies after being set on fire.

Only Yen is left alive and she weeps over YY's body, while the possessed caretaker approaches her from behind with an axe. Before he can kill her, Yen's mother arrives and starts to fight the demon controlling the park. She sacrifices herself by allowing the demon to possess her, so that Yen can use the magic camera to capture the demon. Before dying, she asks Yen to snap pictures of the spirits of her deceased brother, friends, and other victims, and burn the photos to put them to rest. At the last moment, Shan appears and reveals that he was saved by his lucky charm.

In the epilogue, Yen is seen taking over her mother's duties as a ghostbuster while Shan works as a car mechanic. When Yen calls Shan, he does not answer as he has been crushed by a car. It turns out that the demon has survived in their group photo.

== Cast ==
- Bobo Chan as Yen
- Kara Hui as Mrs Yu
- Tiffany Lee as YY
- Derek Tsang as Dan
- Johnathan Cheung as Alan
- Pubate Maganit as Ken
- Laila Boonyasak as Pinky
- Matthew Paul Dean as Shan
- Chalerm Taweebot as Park caretaker
