= Rosella Lau =

Hong Kong model and actress

- 劉莉
- Born: 17 September 1989 (age 37); Wuping County, Fujian, China
- Other names: Lili (莉莉); Lanmei; Kibby
- Citizenship: China (Hong Kong)
- Education: Tsung Tsin Middle School
- Occupations: Model; actress
- Years active: 2008–present
- Agent: TVB (2008–14)

Rosella Lau (Chinese: 劉俐; pinyin: Liú Lì, born 17 September 1989) is a Hong Kong model and actress who has appeared in a number of television series and feature films. In 2008 she signed to the TVB as its artist after which her first performance was in the television show Boom Boom Ba. At the end of 2014, after leaving TVB, she became a freelancer.

== Biography ==
At the age of twelve, Rosella Lau and her family immigrated to Hong Kong from Wuping, Fujian, China. She attended New Asia Middle School and then Tsung Tsin Middle School. She started as a part-time model at junior high school, then turned full-time after graduation because of her success in the television programme Boom Boom Ba which was her entry to the entertainment industry.

== Filmography ==
=== Television (TVB) ===
2009

- Love Kickoff as a cheerleader
- Off Pedder as an angel

2010

- Don Juan DeMercado as a beautiful woman
- The Mysteries of Love as Rachel
- Beauty Knows No Pain as Fion
- Some Day as a pole dancer
- Show Me the Happy as Lanmei

2011

- Dropping By Cloud Nine as Sandy
- Only You as a bride
- Relic of an Emissary as Ru Yan
- Be Home for Dinner as Abby
- My Sister of Eternal Flower as Luo Shiyun
- Super Snoops as Apple
- Til Love Do Us Lie as a female guest
- Bottled Passion as Lulu

2012

- Wish and Switch as Ruby
- Til Love Do Us Lie as Jenny
- Let It Be Love as MiMi
- Gloves Come Off as KaKa
- House of Harmony and Vengeance as Zhen
- Come Home Love as Mei Mei (Episodes 2 and 202) and Victoria (Episode 148)
- Master of Play as a drinker
- Witness Insecurity as Lily
- Three Kingdoms RPG as a beautiful woman (Episode 1)
- Ghetto Justice II as a courtroom secretary
- King Maker as Wen Zijun
- Divas in Distress as a beautiful woman
- Missing You as Bin's girlfriend (Episode 20)

2013

- Friendly Fire as Ouyang Mei (Phoebe)
- Bullet Brain as a young girl (Episode 7)
- Beauty at War as Ge Jiyan
- Slow Boat Home as Ada
- Triumph in the Skies II as Liang Yidi (Edith)
- Always and Ever as Xuanmei Jiali
- The Hippocratic Crush II as Crystal

2014

- Ruse of Engagement as a beer girl (Episode 3)
- Swipe Tap Love as Jenny
- ICAC Investigators 2014 as Sisi (Unit Three)
- Ghost Dragon of Cold Mountain as Xia Lian
- Rear Mirror as Jo Jo
- All That is Bitter is Sweet as Xiao Lu (Rose)
- Tomorrow Is Another Day as CoCo

2015

- Raising the Bar as Lan Jingjing
- Young Charioteers as Tina Fong
- Romantic Repertoire as Lily

2017

- Rogue Emperor as Wedebao Fei

=== TV programmes (TVB) ===
2009

- Boom Boom Ba Ear of the singers of Sing - "Lanmei"
- Beautiful Cooking Delicious Angel - "Lanmei"

2010

- King of Catering Awards 2010
- Big Fun Hong Kong appeared in the big prize
- Fun with Liza and Gods Episode 7

2011

- Neighborhood Gourmet assistant
- Fu Lu Shou Da Jia Guanglin Christmas girl

==== Films ====
- 2010 72 Tenants of Prosperity as VIP telephone saleswoman (Caihong)
- 2011 I Love Hong Kong as Miss Dance 1987
- 2011 The Fortune Buddies as Jing Mo
- 2014 Don't Go Breaking My Heart 2 as (Zhang Shenan) financial girlfriend
- 2016 Three as nurse

=== Music video appearances ===
- Terry Chui music videos (Ban Fenzhong, Bad Girl)
- Alex Fong - Yue Quan Shi music video

=== Photo albums ===
- Tastes of Angels
- Heart beat recording Kibby Rosella
