= Aqua Heroes =

- Promo poster
- 戀愛自由式
- Genre: Modern Drama (Friendship, Sports)
- Starring: Bobo Chan; Edwin Siu; Leila Tong; Bosco Wong; Sheren Tang
- Opening theme: "可疑密友" by Edwin Siu & Bobo Chan
- Country of origin: Hong Kong
- Original language: Cantonese
- No. of episodes: 20

Production
- Running time: 45 minutes (approx.)

Original release
- Network: TVB
- Release: July 28 – August 22, 2003

Aqua Heroes (戀愛自由式) is a twenty episode modern series by Television Broadcasts Limited in Hong Kong.

== Synopsis ==
Yau Han (Bobo Chan) and her sister, Yau Wing (Leila Tong) have been separated for many years and they happen to fall in love with the same guy, Edwin (Edwin Siu). This story is basically about a group of teenagers who love swimming. Along the way they meet hardship and friendship. A Love Triangle that heats up the story.

== Summary ==
The Angels Swimming Club was open a long time ago by Yau Dak when he was a famous swimmer. He even had a nickname called fey yu wong ji. There used to be a lot of students who joined the club, but recently the number of students decreased due to Yau Dak's loss of interest in swimming and hence putting less time and effort into the Angels Swimming Club.

Due to a misunderstanding, Yau Dak and Sandy (Sheren Tang) have been separated for eighteen years, but they did not divorce as both of them still love each other secretly. Sandy took the younger daughter, Rain (Leila Tong), to the United States and left the older daughter, Han (Bobo Chan), with Dak in Hong Kong. Yau Han, aka Busy, is an optimistic and caring girl . However, one of her leg is shorter than the other one and she feels inferior. Because of her leg, she rarely swims but have a deep understanding of swimming. She helps her dad teach kids how to swim.

One day, the community swimming pool that the Angels Swimming Club usually use was taken over by the Devils Swimming Club. At the same time, Rain came back to Hong Kong from the United States to join the Devils Swimming Club and to find her online husband. Another reason that Rain decided to come back is to find her father, Yau Dak. The coincidence is that her online husband happens to be Louis (Bosco Wong). Louis showed Rain a picture of his college friend, Edwin (Edwin Siu), and said that it was him. When Rain found out that she had been played, she was furious at Louis. Meanwhile, she started liking Edwin.

Rain saw her father at the swimming tournament and she was disappointed. Yau Dak had not been swimming for a long time and lost his touch. He was no longer the famous swimmer, therefore Rain was embarrassed by this. She couldn't accept a father like that and was rude to him. Busy, being the respectful daughter, she stood up to Rain for her father. The sisters met at a bad timing, making Rain dislike her father and sister.

-Pairs At The End-

== Cast ==
- Edwin Siu 蕭正楠 as Edwin
- Bobo Chan 陳文媛 as Yau Han 游嫻 (Busy)
- Leila Tong 唐寧 as Yau Wing 游穎 (Rain)
- Bosco Wong 黃宗澤 as Louis
- Sheren Tang 鄧萃雯 as Sandy
- Wilson Tsui 艾威 as Yau Dak
- Matt Yeung 揚明 as Sam
- Stephy Tang 鄧麗欣 as Stephy
- Theresa Fu 傅穎 as Theresa
- Cha Cha Chan 陳文靜 as Grace
- Lai Lok-yi 黎諾懿 as Joe
