= The Gâteau Affairs =

- Promo poster
- 情迷黑森林
- Genre: Modern Drama
- Written by: Chan Kam Ling
- Starring: Joe Ma; Myolie Wu; Bobo Chan; Jack Wu; Annie Man
- Opening theme: Flavour of Life "調味人生" by Bobo Chan
- Country of origin: Hong Kong
- Original language: Cantonese
- No. of episodes: 20

Production
- Producer: Lam Chi Wah
- Running time: 45 minutes (approx.)

Original release
- Network: TVB
- Release: June 6 – July 1, 2005

The Gâteau Affairs (Chinese: 情迷黑森林) is a 20 episode TVB series in late 2004 and early 2005. It stars Joe Ma (馬德鐘), Myolie Wu (胡杏兒), Bobo Chan (陳文媛), Jack Wu (胡諾言) and Annie Man (文頌嫻). Bobo Chan provides the voice for the theme song. Gâteaux is misspelt as "Gâteux" for all scenes and captions within the series.

== Plotline ==
Go Gan is baking a surprise cake for his son, Ban in his work kitchen. It is late in the night and Ban and his mother, Ni wait longingly for father and husband to return. However, they have been living a life of waiting and longing for many years and they are sick of it. They decide to leave for USA. Go Gan then rushes to the airport with his cake to stop them. However, on the way his car crashes into a taxi carrying an old lady. He is spotted by the traffic police who then stop him. Being in a rush, he holds out the cake box and shouts that it is a bomb. However, his plan flops and he is charged with false threat and sentenced to 2 years in jail.

Tong Seung sets up a cake shop to spite her ex-boyfriend, who has always despised her. However, she does not know anything about baking cakes and only has the passion for it. Her brother Jimmy, cousin Keke and colleague Mu Si are trying to coax her out of it but to no avail. They do not say anything about the bad taste of Tong Seung's cakes so as not to hurt her feelings.

Gateau puts up a notice to hire trainees. Yu Le, Tang Shuang and Bu Lang joins the trial and are selected. Training starts and only Bu Lang does well. Uncle Fa, Gateau's cake kitchen supervisor has a fear of ovens because of an accident a few years ago. He needs the other chefs to help him to put the cake into the oven. Gao Gen gets him to overcome his fear.

Tang Shuang and Gao Gen: Tang Shuang eventually recovers and she and Gao Gen bakes cakes under the name of Mr and Mrs Cake Robin Hood.

Sarah and Yu Jiao: They joined Gateau as trainees. (In another version of the story, she falls for Yu Jiao but as she has no confidence in him she does not accept him and instead wants to marry Yu Le and causes a breakup between Keke ad Yu Le)

Goldmine: It was eventually found by one of the chefs of Gateau. Yu Le and Yu Jiao stole the money from the chef. While Yu Le was on the way to the police to surrender the money, he receives the call from Bu Lang and the money is burned in the fire.

Tang Sen and Qu Qi: They reunited and Tang Sen forgives her for abandoning them 22 years ago for her contests.

== Characters ==
- Go Gan (Joe Ma) – Dubbed as the "Cake God" for his innovative cake masterpieces. He has a passion for cake-making and rightly possesses a gift known as "The Freezing Hands", which refers to his hand temperature being much lower than that of the average man. This enables him to touch and shape chocolate with his bare hands without the chocolate melting. He may look cool and cold on the outside but deep down he is a warm-hearted person. A few years before, he married Ni and fathered his son, Ban. But he was NOT the marrying kind; he just put all his energy and time in his cake-making career and in trying to win cake contests. His wife felt neglected, took Ban with her and walked out on him. He then made a bomb threat at the airport, for which he was jailed for 2 years. After his release from prison, he was hired by Mr Sa, boss of Gateau cake shop, to become the Chief Cake Chef. Mr Sa had promised to find his wife and son if he worked for Gateau. Life in prison has NEVER dulled his passion and skill for baking cakes. He decides to assume a secret identity -"Cake Robin Hood"- to bake cakes for the less fortunate children. He goes through difficult phases of his life to win back custody of his son and become the best cake chef in the world. He falls in love with Tong Seung but will their relationship ever work out?
- Tong Seung (Myolie Wu) – A cheerful, nerdy girl who has a passion for baking cakes but not the skills. In the beginning of the show, she sets up a cake shop to prove to her ex-boyfriend that she could bake cakes. However, she didn't even have the skill to build a proper cake and thus business was poor. The shop was eventually burned down. Tong Seung suspected it was Go Gan who had burned down her shop and thus she joined Gateau as a trainee cake chef for revenge. She posts a message on "Cake Robin Hood"'s website asking him for a birthday cake for her 25th birthday. She admires "Cake Robin Hood" as he sends her another cake telling her not to give up. She eventually becomes the disciple of Go Gan after finding out that he was not the one who set fire to her shop. However, a misunderstanding causes her to hate her Master so much that she challenges him to a duel where they would pit their skills against each other for the title of "Chief Cake Chef". She finds it hard to compete against Go Gan as she realises that she had fallen in love with him. Towards the end of the show, she realises that she too had a special skill in making cakes. Her skill was " Mother's Hand". A skill that enables her hands to heat up fast enough for her to pull sugar- a technique used by bakers to create objects from sugar. She contracted brain cancer after being struck by lightning,.
- Sarah (Annie Man) – Only child of Mr Sa and Young Mistress of Gateau cake enterprises. A strict and spoilt girl who tries her best to prove to her father that she is capable of handling the business. She doesn't know a single thing about cakes and thinks that baking cakes is just an object for earning money. However, when Go Gan arrives and becomes Chief Cake Chef, she feels that her position as a boss would be affected. She hates Go Gan and finds opportunities to fault him for anything wrong. She conspires with Tang Shuang initially to get rid of Go Gan. However, when Tong Seung backs out of their plans, she is forced to work with the previous Chief Cake Chef of Gateau, Jean Paul. Eventually, she realises the importance of cakes to the business and becomes a trainee at Gateau. Is always seen in the show wearing boots and mini skirts. She is less fortunate than other rich girls as she has to work for her money while the other girls just shop and shop. She does not have bodyguards until later when she employed Yu Jiao unlike the other girls.
- Sun Yu Le (Jack Wu) – A gangster who had once protected Go Gan from a stab in prison. Hence, Go Gan feels guilty towards him and treats him better than any of his staff. Has 3 criminal records. Reckless and hot headed, he once set Tong Seung's cake shop on fire. Yu Le becomes a trainee at Gateau but he does not have a passion for cakes not to mention the skills. However, Go Gan always chooses him to be his assistant. He falls in love with Keke but a rival in love enters their relationship and the straining relationship between Tong Seung and Go Gan affects them.
- Keke aka Coco (Bobo Chan) – Tong Seung's younger cousin. Her parents divorced and both remarried. Both parents didn't want her even though she had tried her best to fit into 2 new families. As a result, she does not have any confidence in relationships as she fears that it would end up like her parents. Pretty and kind hearted, she has a long line of suitors but she only has eyes for Yu Le. Supervisor of Gateau, she manages the business well and treats her colleagues very well. Her favourite childhood things are 3 treasure rice, 2 flavoured popsicles and woolen objects..
- Yu Jiao (Ai Wei) – Good friend of Yu Le and bodyguard of Sarah. He is an ex prison inmate who would do anything to protect Sarah. He was told that there was a goldmine in Gateau and thus he uses his relationship with Yu Le and Sarah to find the treasure. He eventually becomes a trainee at Gateau along with Sarah. Loyal but a bit of a showoff and money lover.
- Tong Sam (Gordan Liu) – Father of Tong Seung and owner of Sam Gei Laundry. A caring father who is bald but wears a wig. His wife left him early and thus he was responsible to raise his 2 children. He has always opposes to Tang Shuang being a cake chef and tries his best to make her quit her job to help out at the laundry shop.
- Qu Qi (Li Feng) – Mother of Tong Seung. Once the Cake Queen of France but a suicide attempt causes her to lose her memory. She is the original skill master of "Mother's Hand". An accident caused by Go Gan causes her sister to be admitted to a hospital leaving her to spend her days at Go Gan's home. She has a sleepwalking problem and while she was sleepwalking in Gao Gen's home, she baked very delicious cakes but when she woke up the next day she couldn't remember anything about baking cakes. It was until her adoptive sister told her about her real identity that she started teaching her daughter about the "Mother's Hand".
- Bo Long (Deng Yi Jun) – Trainee at Gateau. He is a 3 doctorate holder who likes to experiment with different types of food so that he can one day write a book on food formulas. A brilliant scientist who views everything including relationships from a scientific viewpoint. He falls in love with Keke and an accident at his home almost caused Keke to be burned to death. Even though he is a scientist he is the most highly skilled trainee at Gateau . Nerdy but hardworking.
- Jimmy (Charles Szeto) – Brother of Tong Seung. An undergraduate who teaches yoga. Cheerful and caring.
- Mu Si (Ma Tai Lo) – Sam Gei Laundry's only employee. She has always liked Tong Sam but has never made a move even though his wife is no longer with him. Lazy and demanding, she always pushes her job to Tong Seung and Jimmy.
- Jean Paul (Gregory Charles Rivers) – Gateau 's ex- Chief Cake Chef. Hates Go Gan for replacing him and makes use of Sarah to get back at Go Gan and Mr Sa for firing him. Arrogant and allows his cake chefs to mess around in the kitchen.
