= Cupid Love =

1995 Singaporean television film

- Promotional poster
- Chinese: 七月俏佳人
- Literal meaning: "Belle of the Seventh Month"
- Hanyu Pinyin: Qī yuè qiào jiā rén
- Genre: Romance; Supernatural
- Screenplay by: Tin Kam-leng
- Story by: Ching Git-yan; Tin Kam-leng
- Directed by: Sampson Yuen
- Starring: Athena Chu; Chen Hanwei
- Music by: Deng Lianyu
- Opening theme: "Guan Huai Fang Shi" ("The Way of Caring") by Chua Lee Lian and Chen Hanwei
- Ending theme: "Ai Ya Ya La La La" by Ziozio Lim and Chua Lee Lian; "Die Ao" by Ziozio Lim and Chua Lee Lian; "Yi Sheng Chi Lian" by Chua Lee Lian
- Country of origin: Singapore
- Original language: Mandarin

Production
- Executive producer: Sampson Yuen
- Cinematography: Dong Siguang
- Editor: Lai Zhenjiang
- Running time: 88 minutes
- Production company: Television Corporation of Singapore

Original release
- Network: Channel 8
- Release: 4 November 1995

Cupid Love (Chinese: 七月俏佳人) is a 1995 Singaporean television film which spawned the popular duet "Guan Huai Fang Shi" performed by Chua Lee Lian and Chen Hanwei. Directed by Sampson Yuen, the feature-length telemovie stars Athena Chu and Chen Hanwei. It also features 1995 Star Search contestants Ziozio Lim, Robin Goh and Aric Ho.

== Synopsis ==
The plot follows a getai singer who falls in love with her American pen pal, and finds out that he is the son of a wealthy man and is suffering from a terminal illness.

== Cast ==
- Chen Hanwei as Xu Wenqiang
  - Koay Jing Li as young Xu Wenqiang
- Athena Chu as Deng Qingqing
  - Fan Wenqing as young Deng Qingqing
- Koh Chieng Mun as Deng Xiaoling
- Ziozio Lim as Deng Meimei
- Robin Goh as Paul
- Aric Ho as Ah Jian (Coffee King)
- Wang Changli as Cousin Sen
- Zhou Quanxi as Uncle Chen
- Wu Weiqiang as Sen's father
- Chen Xuefen as Judy
- Huang Benxin as Judy's boyfriend
