= Race Wong =

- Born: Wong Yuen Pui (simplified Chinese: 黄婉佩; traditional Chinese: 黃婉佩; pinyin: Huáng wǎn pèi); 7 September 1982 (age 44); Kuala Lumpur, Malaysia
- Education: University of Newcastle
- Occupations: Singer; actress
- Years active: 2002–2009
- Known for: CEO of DreamR
- Spouses: Chan Ching Kai (m. 2004; div. 2009) David Loh (m. 2016)
- Children: 2
- Family: Rosanne Wong (sister); Rhonda Wong (sister)
- Musical career
- Origin: Malaysia
- Genres: Cantopop
- Formerly of: 2R

Chinese name
- Traditional Chinese: 黃婉伶
- Simplified Chinese: 黄婉伶
Transcriptions
Standard Mandarin
- Hanyu Pinyin: Huáng wǎn líng
Yue: Cantonese
- Jyutping: wong4 jyun2 ling4

Race Wong is a Singaporean actress, singer and businesswoman. She was one of the former Hong Kong cantopop duo singer group 2R alongside her elder sister Rosanne Wong.

== Career ==
Born in Malaysia and raised in Singapore, she pursued her career in the entertainment industry in Hong Kong with her sister Rosanne Wong which won her various awards for her singing career as the cantopop group 2R, including Most Promising Newcomer and Most Popular Group Award in the Annual Top 10 Song of the Year Awards (2003), Metro Broadcasting Music awards (2004), TVB Top 10 Songs of the Year (2004) and Hong Kong Commercial Radio Music Awards (2003).

Wong became a spotlight when she was chosen to star alongside Stephen Chow in his famous annual San Miguel TV advertisement. Following that, she rose to fame for her leading role in a TVB youth series Hearts of Fencing. Which jumpstarted both her singing and acting career.

Wong hoped to focus her acting on roles beyond her youthful and sweet appearance. Her outstanding performance in her first leading role in the movie Abnormal Beauty won her a nomination for Best New Actor in the 24th Annual Hong Kong Film Awards (2005) and the 42nd Golden Horse Film Awards' (2005) in Taiwan. Wong continued to experiment with different roles both on-screen and off-screen. In 2006, together with her sister Rosanne Wong, they took on groundbreaking leading roles in a musical adaption of The Smiling Proud Wanderer stage performance by the Hong Kong Dance Company (2006) where Rosanne famously shaved bald for the role. The musical enjoyed a success which brought them to perform in Shanghai the following year.

Later in 2008, Wong's starring role as a pregnant new immigrant from China was a break away from her usual youthful image in the movie True Women for Sale which earned her a nomination for Best Supporting Actress in the 28th Hong Kong Film Awards in 2009.

Over the years as 2R, Wong has been a product spokesperson for various products such as Modern Beauty, Microworks Technology, Citicall, Biotherm, SAFA Mp3, 2R Online, 花花瘦身茶 (Fruity Flower Tea) and Polaroid & Cool-iCam.

In 2010, Wong took a Masters of Business course and graduated with a Masters of Business, majoring in marketing, from the University of Newcastle (Australia) in 2013. Concurrently in 2011, she made an unexpected career change into finance, taking on the role of marketing manager at Maybank Kim Eng Securities (Hong Kong). She was licensed with the Securities and Futures Commission to conduct equities trading.

The year she turned 30, Wong relocated back to Singapore where her family is based. Together with her younger sister, Rhonda, she set up Anthill Realtors Pte. Ltd in 2013. She then co-founded Ohmyhome Pte Ltd in 2016, a tech company focused on connecting buyers to sellers, and landlords to tenants in real estate. When asked about her career move, Wong said that she wanted to focus her attention on something that would provide more value to people, something on the opposite spectrum of her celebrity lifestyle.

== Personal life ==
Wong has a daughter, Cara Loh, born in 2017. She gave birth to her second child, Damon, in 2021.

== Videography ==
=== Music videos ===
- 2007 張棟樑 – "錯了再錯"
- 2003 Joakim – "Come into My Kitchen" MV (法國)/
- Joakim – "Come into My Kitchen" MV (France)
- 2003 黃凱芹 – 《易愛難收》/ Chris Wong – 《易愛難收》
- 2003/3 郭富城 – "愛的動力"/"原動力" MV (中國) /
- Aaron Kwok – "愛的動力" / "原動力" MV (China)
- 2002 余文樂 -《還你門匙》/ Shawn Yue -《還你門匙》

== Awards ==
=== 2003 ===
- Most Promising Newcomer (Group) – 26th Annual Top 10 Song of the Year Awards
- Most Explosive Newcomer (Group) – 2003 Metro Broadcasting Music Awards
- Best New Group Bronze Award – 2003 Hong Kong Commercial Radio Music Awards

=== 2004 ===
- Most Popular Group Gold Award – 2003 TVB Top 10 Songs of the Year Awards
- Most Popular Group – 2004 Metro Broadcasting Music Awards

=== 2005 ===
- Best New Actor (Race Wong – nominated) – 24th Annual Hong Kong Film Awards
- Best New Actor (Race Wong – nominated) – 42nd Golden Horse Film Awards
- 新城勁爆跳舞歌曲 新世界 – 2005 Metro Broadcasting Music Awards

=== 2006 ===
- 新城勁爆創意表現大獎 – 2006 Metro Broadcasting Music Awards

=== 2009 ===
- Best Supporting Actress (Race Wong – nominated) – 28th Hong Kong Film Awards

== Filmography ==
Year	Title	Role	Awards
2003	Hearts of Fencing	Lam Lam	
2003	Sound of Colors		
2004	Love is a Many Stupid Thing		
2004	Ab-normal Beauty	Jiney	Nominated – Hong Kong Film Award for Best New Performer
2004	Sunshine Heartbeat	Lam Lam	
2005	The Unusual Youth	Suki	
2005	Moments of Love	Strawberry	
2005	China's Next Top Princess	Pearl	
2006	Cocktail	Stella	
2006	Black Night	Hosie	
2006	The Third Eye		
2007	Dancing Lion		
2008	A Decade of Love		
2008	True Women For Sale	Wong Lin-fa	Nominated – Hong Kong Film Award for Best Supporting Actress
2008	See You in YouTube		
2009	Short of Love	Christy	
2010	Shanghai		
2011	Lan Kwai Fong		
