= The Conmen in Vegas =

1999 Hong Kong film by Wong Jing

- Film poster

Chinese name
- Traditional Chinese: 賭俠大戰拉斯維加斯
- Simplified Chinese: 赌侠大战拉斯维加斯
Transcriptions
Standard Mandarin
- Hanyu Pinyin: Dǔ Xiá Dà Zhàn Lā Sī Wéi Jiā Sī
Yue: Cantonese
- Jyutping: Dou2 Hap6 Daai6 Zin3 Laai1 Si1 Wai4 Gaa1 Si1
- Directed by: Wong Jing
- Written by: Wong Jing
- Produced by: Wong Jing
- Starring: Andy Lau; Natalis Chan; Nick Cheung; Kelly Lin; Meggie Yu; Jewel Lee; Alex Man
- Cinematography: Horace Wong
- Edited by: Marco Mak; Angie Lam
- Music by: Ronald Ng
- Production companies: Win's Entertainment; Jing's Production
- Distributed by: China Star Entertainment Group
- Release date: 25 June 1999
- Running time: 93 minutes
- Country: Hong Kong
- Language: Cantonese
- Box office: HK$17,761,670

The Conmen in Vegas is a 1999 Hong Kong action comedy film produced, written and directed by Wong Jing and is a sequel to the 1998 film The Conman. The film stars original returning cast members Andy Lau and Nick Cheung with new cast members Natalis Chan, Kelly Lin, Meggie Yu, Alex Man and Jewel Lee in her debut film role. The film was partially filmed in the Caesars Palace Resort, Las Vegas.

== Plot ==
The story directly follows The Conman, where Dragon's sister, Ching, has left to study in Canada. After King and Dragon defeat Macau Mon, they become swindling partners. Along with Dragons' older cousin Luk Chard, the trio try swindling a large amount of money from Big Eyed Man at his underground casino. While the trio are enjoying themselves, unexpectedly, Man sends people to kill them and kidnap Dragon.

King and Luk Chard are brought to the Senior Chinese Front. It turns out that they want to hire them to go to Las Vegas to complete a task: to catch Peter Chu, a man who was in charge of multiple Tofu-dreg projects in the past few years in China, and then stole a large amount of money and fled to the United States. Because Chu is backed by many American politicians and organised gangs, they could not use diplomatic and legal channels to extradite him, they could only send a few gambling experts to catch him in the Caesars Palace casino where he visits daily. King and Luk would receive $120,000,000 as a reward. Since King needs to give $30,000,000 to Big Eyed Man to rescue Dragon, he accepts the task and goes to Las Vegas with Luk Chard.

Upon arriving in Las Vegas, King and Luk Chard encounters two gorgeous ladies Betty and Sammi, whom they previously met in Hong Kong. The four of them set a trap where Sammi seduces Chu and successfully capture him, but Chu has secretly notified his henchmen and girlfriend, Fei-fei, who are waiting for the arrival of the four at the airport, so King decides to escort Chu via a road trip to Los Angeles and board a flight there. However, Chu tries to break free on the way, which startles the bus driver and passengers, causing the four and Chu to travel on foot in the desert, where both Chu and Luk Chard suffer from rattlesnake bites. Luckily, King encounters his friend, adult film director Handsome Wu, who was filming in the desert. Wu helps King stage a rescue attack using cinematic effects to fool Chu and successfully escorts the latter back to China to be taken by mainland authorities (“Senior Chinese Front”) who have rescued Dragon from Big Eyed Man The FBI was able to retrieve the stolen money after King and Handsome trick Chu into revealing the password of his safe. In the end, King and Betty also become lovers.

== Cast ==
- Andy Lau as King, a master gambler and con artist who helps mainland law enforcement (“Senior Chinese Front (SCF)”) in capturing swindler Peter Chu in order to save his abducted apprentice, Dragon.
- Natalis Chan as Luk Chard, (阿叻), Dragon's older cousin who serves as King's side kick.
- Nick Cheung as Dragon (化骨龍), King's apprentice who was abducted by Big Eyed Man after swindling the latter.
- Kelly Lin as Betty (阿扁), a Taiwanese girl sent by the SCF to assist King and Luk Chard and develops a romance with the former.
- Meggie Yu as Sammi (小心), Betty's friend who was also sent by the SCF to assist King and Luk Chard in capturing Peter Chu.
- Jewel Lee as Fei-fei (菲菲), Peter Chu's girlfriend and bodyguard.
- Alex Man as Peter Chu (朱培琨), a swindler wanted by the Chinese government after getting rich in Tofu-dreg project schemes.
- Nam Yin as Big Eyed Man 大眼文), a triad leader who abducts Dragon, who schemed with King and Luk Chard to swindle him.
- Wong Jing as Handsome Wu, King's friend who is an adult film director working in Hollywood.
- Leung Kei-hei as Big Eyed Man's thug.
- So Wai-nam as Big Eyed Man's thug.

== Theme song ==
- Only You in My Heart (心只有你)
  - Composer: Duck Lau
  - Lyricist: Andy Lau
  - Singer: Andy Lau

== Box office ==
The film grossed HK$17,761,670 during its theatrical run from 25 June to 21 July 1999 in Hong Kong.

== See also ==
- List of films set in Las Vegas
