= Love Is a Many Stupid Thing =

2004 Hong Kong film by Wong Jing

- DVD cover

Chinese name
- Traditional Chinese: 精裝追女仔2004
- Simplified Chinese: 精装追女仔2004
Transcriptions
Standard Mandarin
- Hanyu Pinyin: Jīng Zhuāng Zhuì Nǚ Zái Ér Líng Líng Sì
Yue: Cantonese
- Jyutping: Zing1 Zong1 Zeoi1 Neoi2 Zai2 Ji6 Ling4 Ling4 Sei3
- Directed by: Wong Jing
- Written by: Wong Jing
- Produced by: Wong Jing; Clarence Yip
- Starring: Eric Tsang; Chapman To; Natalis Chan; Shawn Yue; Lam Chi-chung; Raymond Wong Ho-yin
- Cinematography: Edmund Fung; Dick Tung
- Edited by: Azrael Chung
- Music by: Ken Chan
- Production company: Film Dynasty Ltd.
- Distributed by: Jing's Production
- Release date: 21 May 2004
- Running time: 95 minutes
- Country: Hong Kong
- Language: Cantonese
- Box office: HK$4,011,134

Love Is a Many Stupid Thing is a 2004 Hong Kong comedy film written, produced and directed by Wong Jing and starring Eric Tsang, Chapman To, Natalis Chan, Shawn Yue, Lam Chi-chung and Raymond Wong Ho-yin. The film is a parody of the 2002 hit film Infernal Affairs, which featured Tsang, To and Yue. The film depicts a bizarre and nonsense war between police and the triads.

== Plot ==
Inspector Nat (Natalis Chan) send three undercover cops Ray (Chapman To), Tom (Shawn Yue) and Chubbie (Lam Chi-chung) to infiltrate triad boss Sam (Eric Tsang). Sam also sent Watson (Raymond Wong Ho-yin) as a mole to the police force. During their mission, Ray, Tom and Chubbie fall for three beautiful policewoman Angel (Belinda Hamnett), Leila (Race Wong) and Sharon (Iris Wong).

== Cast ==
Cast	Role
Eric Tsang	Sam
Chapman To	Ray
Natalis Chan	Inspector Nat
Shawn Yue	Crazy Tom
Lam Chi-chung	Chubbie
Raymond Wong Ho-yin	Watson
Candice Yu	Mandy
Race Wong	Leila
Rosanne Wong	Cop
Belinda Hamnett	Angel
Teresa Mak	Cool Lady
Iris Wong	Sharon
Max Mok	Ghost
Michael Miu	Temper
Kent Tong	Tom
Cheung Kwok Keung	Lies
Stanley Fung	Police sergeant
Jerry Lamb	Kelvin
Matt Chow	Jimmy
Tony Ho	arrested sex offender
Angie Cheung	Doris
Zuki Lee	wife of one of the 4 Kings
Gobby Wong	wife of one of the 4 Kings
Shirley Hung	wife of one of the 4 Kings
Eddie Pang	
Carmen Yeung	Sean's wife
Wong Jing	Ray's uncle
Lee Fung	Ray's mom
Athena Chu	herself
Wong Tin-lam	Lobster
Yeung Man Chun	Lobster's bodyguard
Ankee Leung	Sam's mechanic
Ray Pang	Sam's mechanic
Poon An Ying	Rosamund Kwan
Dick Tung	Police Sergeant questioning Ray
Lee Luk Yu	Debbie
Hui Kam Fung	Office Yip
Tam Kon Chung	Ray's gangster
Chow Mei Sing	Kelvin's gangster
Terry Lee	Kelvin's gangster
So Wai Nam	Kelvin's gangster
Ho Wai Yip	Kelvin's gangster
