= Rosanne Wong =

- Born: 30 June 1979 (age 47); Malaysia
- Occupations: Singer; actress
- Family: Race Wong (sister); Rhonda Wong (sister)
- Musical career
- Origin: Malaysia
- Genres: Cantopop
- Formerly of: 2R
- Website: alivenotdead.com/rosannewong

Rosanne Wong (黃婉君, Wong Yuen-Guan) is a Malaysian-born singer and actress. She is best known as one half of the Hong Kong cantopop music duo group 2R alongside younger sister Race Wong. In 2004, she appeared alongside her sister in the Asian horror film Ab-normal Beauty.

In 2024, Wong released a new song, "Get Handsome" (帥起來), her first release since 2006.

== Background ==
She was born in Malaysia and moved to Singapore with her family at a very young age. Her younger sisters are Race Wong and Rhonda Wong. She was discovered by an agent while performing in a singing contest.

Wong married a dentist and had two sons. As of 2024, she was running their dental clinic business and writing a book about children.

== Filmography ==
- Hearts of Fencing (2003) (TVB)
- Sound of Colors (2003)
- Love is a Many Stupid Thing (2004)
- Ab-normal Beauty (2004)
- China's Next Top Princess (2005)
