= Hearts of Fencing =

- Official poster
- 當四葉草碰上劍尖時
- Genre: Modern Drama
- Starring: Lai Lok-yi; Don Li; Race Wong; Natalie Tong; Eddie Li; Sam Chan; Elaine Yiu; Edmond Leung; Kelly Fu
- Opening theme: "Shining Friends" by 2R
- Country of origin: Hong Kong
- Original language: Cantonese
- No. of episodes: 11

Production
- Running time: 45 minutes (approx.)

Original release
- Network: TVB
- Release: 12 February – 25 June 2003

Related
- Sunshine Heartbeat (2004), Dressage to Win (2008), Love Kickoff (2009)

Hearts of Fencing (當四葉草碰上劍尖時) is a 2003 television drama on Hong Kong station Television Broadcasts Limited. The series, targeted at an audience of teenagers and young adults, focused on the lives of students from an international school, with a heavy theme of fencing.

== Description ==
A group of high school students, bonded by dreams, interests, and friendship, encounter a series of events. Through laughter and tears, they're brought closer together, helping each other through the best and worst moments.

Years ago, Song Ngai High School was the alma mater of the Four Legendary Fencers. They won every fencing challenge and was supposed to bring fame to the seemingly unremarkable private school. However, the day before the fencing finals, the Four disappeared.

With the new school year, Lam Lam, Ching Ching, Man Man, Miu Miu, and 13 Mui are joining to restore the long-forgotten school magazine, and the Fencing Club is the talk of the town once again with its new promising members: Ah Lok, Don, Ah Yat, and Ah Lung. With the collision of both groups and various personalities, love interests and relationships burst forth.

== Characters ==
Cheng Ga Lam / "Lam Lam" (Race Wong): Lam Lam is the main female protagonist - optimistic, loyal, and personable. Since she was a child, she has always believed that four-leaf clovers bring hope, faith, love, and luck. Lam Lam lives with her aunt and volunteers to help revive the school's magazine. Throughout the series, she becomes the love interest of Ah Lok, Don, and Ah Yat.

Go Ching / "Ching Ching" (Natalie Tong): Ching Ching dreams of becoming a professional artist and loves bringing her camera everywhere to take pictures of people and celebrities. Though she's best friends with Lam Lam and remains loyal, she has a secret crush on Don, making Lam Lam her love rival.

Lam Suet Man / "Man Man" (Elaine Yiu): Man Man is a bookworm and hopeless romantic. She starts out wearing glasses and outdated clothing but changes her appearance for Ah Lung (and herself).

Wong Miu Yee / "Miu Miu" (Renne Dai): Miu Miu is a foodie and loves to eat, bake, and critique food, hoping to become a true food critic. She shares this common interest with Fei Cheung.

Tsui Kam Mui / "13 Mui" (Kelly Fu): 13 Mui is the school's campus belle with a long line of suitors, and her nickname even comes from the number of relationships she's had until this point. Since she was twelve, she's dreamed of being Miss Hong Kong one day and getting married by 25.

Au-Yeung Yat / "Ah Yat" (Lai Lok-yi): Ah Yat is Ah Lok's older brother. The two are very different but have a close relationship. Though initially a lazy underachiever on the outside, Ah Yat eventually shows how responsible, trustworthy, and caring he can really be. Like his brother, he grows to become a promising fencer with one advantage: left-handedness.

Au-Yeung Lok / "Ah Lok" (Don Li): Ah Lok is Ah Yat's younger brother. The two are very different but have a close relationship. Ah Lok is an A+ student, excellent fencer, and one of the most popular boys in school. Immediately, he takes a liking to Lam Lam.

Chu Moon Tong / Don (Eddie Lee): Don is a stereotypical rich kid and constantly flaunts his wealth, thinking that money can solve everything. While he never has bad intentions, his actions cause a rift between him and his classmates, and he ends up treating Ah Lung like his personal attendant. He likes Lam Lam but his affection is, confusingly and annoyingly to him, unrequited. Eventually, he changes for the better for Ching Ching.

Gwan Yu Lung / "Ah Lung" (Sam Chan): Ah Lung is Don's best friend. While everyone mostly dislikes Don, Ah Lung willingly trails after him due to Don's unconditional generosity throughout their friendship.

Leung Guang Cheung / "Fei Cheung" (Markus Ng): Fei Cheung is one of the many classmates of the gang. Though he doesn't join the school magazine or Fencing Club, he takes an interest in Ah Miu due to her eating habits.

Lau Hak Fung / "Dai Hak" (Zac Kao): Dai Hak is a very gifted fencer in a rival school, and beating him becomes Ah Lok's goal. In the end, he becomes 13 Mui's fourteenth relationship, effectively changing her nickname to "14 Mui".

== Reception ==
This series has been heavily criticized for its inaccurate portrayal of fencing techniques and scoring methods. For example, one does not slash repeatedly with a foil, and hits should register immediately without delay.
