= 2R (group) =

Hong Kong Cantopop duo

- Born: Malaysia
- Years active: 2001–2007
- Musical career
- Origin: Hong Kong
- Genres: Cantopop, Hong Kong English pop
- Instruments: Singing
- Label: Universal Music Group
- Past members: Rosanne Wong; Race Wong
- Website: www.alivenotdead.com/rosannewong; www.alivenotdead.com/racewong

2R is a former cantopop duo group in Hong Kong. The duo group consisted of two sisters, Rosanne Wong and Race Wong, who were born in Malaysia and raised in Singapore.

They have a dedicated fan base and their recent albums, "2R Revolution" and "2R New + Best Selection", have been reasonably successful. The motion picture "Ab-Normal Beauty" (死亡寫真) starring the two sisters also earned Race Wong a "Best New Actor nomination" at the Hong Kong Film Award and Golden Horse Award.

== Biography ==
Both of them were born in Malaysia but moved to Singapore with their family at very early ages. Rosanne was born on 30 June 1979, while Race was born on 7 September 1982. Before entering show business, they studied together at Fowlie Primary School before attending Tanjong Katong Secondary School. They attended the Curtin University of Technology in Perth, Western Australia. The pair were discovered by an agent during a singing contest in 1998 and were brought to Hong Kong. They were eventually signed by Universal Music.

== Beginning ==
Although 2R has yet to achieve the level of success that others have in the beginning, they arguably went through a much harder time. The agent who initially signed the sisters had arranged an apartment for them in Hong Kong and was able to get them a few modelling jobs but nothing substantial materialised. Meanwhile, the sisters were working on improving their Cantonese while recording their first album in the hopes of attracting more fans. However, their agent suddenly disappeared and the sisters were burdened with several months of unpaid rent and were eventually evicted. Without an agent and money, the sisters turned to their parents who helped them pay off their debt and found them a new home. Soon afterwards they were signed by Universal Music.

== Separate success ==
Although 2R usually perform together, the sisters exhibit two different styles. Rosanne the elder sister is more mature, naive and elegant, while Race is more youthful and energetic. However it is Race who has experienced the greater success with appearances in various commercials, magazine covers, and movies. In the movie Sound of Colours (地下鐵), both Rosanne and Race made cameo appearances but only Race's scene made it to the big screen. They also starred in the Wong Jing's movie Love Is A Many Stupid Thing (精裝追女仔2004) where Race played a major role while Rosanne's character was limited to just a few on-screen appearances. It was not until Ab-normal Beauty (死亡寫真) in 2004 that both sisters played significant parts. It was followed by China's Next Top Princess (妃子笑) in 2005, and The Smiling Proud Wanderer stage performance by the Hong Kong Dance Company in 2006.

== Discography ==
- Two of Us AVEP (October 2003)
- Two of Us (2nd Version)
- Two of Us (3rd Version)
- United R (March 2004)
- United R (2nd Version)
- Revolution (March 2005)
- 2R New + Best Selection (31 May 2006)

== Filmography ==
- November 2003 Sound of Colours (地下鐵) (Race & Rosanne)
- December 2003 Love is a Many Stupid Thing (精裝追女仔 2004) (Race & Rosanne)
- November 2004 Ab-normal Beauty (死亡寫真) (Race & Rosanne)
- May 2005 The Unusual Youth (非常青春期) (Race)
- August 2005 Moments of Love (擁抱每一刻花火) (Race)
- November 2005 China's Next Top Princess (妃子笑) (Race & Rosanne)
- January 2006 Cocktail (半醉人間) (Race)
- April 2006 The Third Eye (小心眼) (Race)
- April 2006 Black Night (黑夜) – The Next Door (Race)
- September 2008 A Decade of Love (十分鍾情) (Race)
- December 2008 True Women For Sale (性工作者2 我不賣身‧我賣子宮) (Race)

== Concerts ==
- 15 July 2006 2R Mini concert (2R 迷你音樂聚會)

== TV appearances ==
- 2002
  - Feel 100% (百分百感觉)
- 2003
  - Heart of Fencing (當四葉草碰上劍尖時)
- 2004
  - Sunshine Heartbeat (赤沙印記@四葉草.2)
- 2005
  - If The Moon Has Eyes (如果月亮有眼睛) – Rosanne only
  - Bizarre Files (奇幻潮)
  - The Rainbow Connection (舞出彩虹) – Rosanne only

== Awards ==
- 2003
  - Most Promising Newcomer (Group) – 26th Annual Top 10 Song of the Year Awards'
  - Most Explosive Newcomer (Group) – 2003 Metro Broadcasting Music Awards'
  - Best New Group Bronze Award – 2003 Hong Kong Commercial Radio Music Awards'
- 2004
  - Most Popular Group Gold Award – 2003 TVB Top 10 Songs of the Year Awards'
  - Most Popular Group – 2004 Metro Broadcasting Music Awards'
- 2005
  - Best New Actor (Race Wong – nominated) – 24th Annual Hong Kong Film Awards'
  - Best New Actor (Race Wong – nominated) – 42nd Golden Horse Film Awards'
  - 新城勁爆跳舞歌曲 新世界 – 2005 Metro Broadcasting Music Awards'
- 2006
  - 新城勁爆創意表現大獎 – 2006 Metro Broadcasting Music Awards'
- 2009
  - Best Supporting Actress (Race Wong – nominated) – 28th Hong Kong Film Awards'
