= It Had to Be You! =

2005 Hong Kong film by Maurice Li and Andrew Loo

- Directed by: Maurice Li; Andrew Loo
- Screenplay by: Theresa Tang
- Produced by: Eric Tsang; Claudie Chung
- Starring: Karena Lam; Ekin Cheng
- Cinematography: Chan Chi-ying; Thomas Yeung
- Edited by: Azrael Chung
- Music by: Eugene Pao; Clement Fung; Eddie Chung; Drum Music
- Production companies: United Filmmakers Organisation (UFO); SMI Corporation
- Distributed by: Mei Ah Entertainment
- Release date: 4 March 2005
- Running time: 93 minutes
- Country: Hong Kong
- Language: Cantonese

It Had to Be You! (後備甜心) is a 2005 Hong Kong romantic comedy film featuring the directorial debuts of Maurice Li and Andrew Loo, starring Ekin Cheng and Karena Lam.

== Plot ==
Restaurant supervisor Jill (Karena Lam) has a handsome boyfriend, Chi-on (Hu Bing), but she is just his backup girlfriend. She knows she is the other girl, but her hope for being his one and only has never ceased until he changes his formal girlfriend once again. All her anger goes to her co-worker, Jack (Ekin Cheng), who appears to be a womanizer but indeed shares a similar unfortunate romantic situation of being the backup boyfriend of an airhostess. Knowing that both are victims in romantic relationships, Jack and Jill no longer spar with each other and a liking between them start to develop.

== Cast ==
- Karena Lam as Jill so
- Ekin Cheng as Jack
- Eric Tsang as Jason
- Hu Bing as Wai Chi-on
- Bobo Chan as Grace
- Nicola Cheung as Moon
- Yan Ng as Apple
- Derek Tsang as Pie
- Fire Lee as Fatty
- Kristal Tin as Lisa
- Chin Ka-lok as Big guy
- Hiro Hayama as Sung Tsing-yeung
- Benz Hui as Jacob
- Kiki Sheung as Jill's mother
- Siu Keung as Fluffy
- Lo Mang as Fireman
- Kwok Wing-nam as Chi-on's friend
- Eric Li as Chi-on's friend
- Lau Sam-yi as Chi-on's friend
- Ng Wang-hung as Chi-on's friend
- Chan Man-chung as Violin teacher
- Yan Man-yee as Office lady A
- Lo Sau-wai as Office lady B
- Choi Jing-man as Office lady C
- Stephen Tsui as Jason's friend
- Chiu Chiu-wai as Jason's friend
- Guthrie Yip as Jill's friend
- Kitty Ho as Jill's friend
- Benjamin Yuen as Jill's friend
- Yau Wing-yan as Jill's friend
- Leung Ho-ming as Taxi driver
- Chan Hung as Kissing couple
- Woo Hiu-sam as Kissing couple
- Hui Siu-to as Jill's old security
- Ding Chu-wai as Antique shop manager
- Pauline Yeung as Supermarket staff
- Poon King-lam as Bridesmaid
- Chan Wing-kei as Bridesmaid
- Cheung Chan-kit as Best man
- Wong Kwok-man as Best Man
- Chan Chun-shan as Hip-Hop guy
- Chan Chun-chung as Hip-Hop guy
- Lam Kam-yuen as Hip-Hop guy
- Ting Ling-ling as Jason's wife

== See also ==
- List of Hong Kong films
