= Whispers and Moans (film) =

2007 film by Herman Yau

- Film poster
- Directed by: Herman Yau
- Written by: Yang Yeeshan; Herman Yau
- Based on: Whispers and Moans by Yeeshan Yang
- Produced by: Ng Kin Hung
- Starring: Athena Chu; Candice Yu; Mandy Chiang; Monie Tung; Yan Ng; Don Li; Patrick Tang
- Cinematography: Yu Guobing
- Edited by: Yau Chi Wai
- Music by: Mak Chun Hung
- Production company: Cameron Entertainment Ltd.
- Distributed by: Mei Ah Entertainment
- Release date: 17 May 2007
- Running time: 99 minutes
- Country: Hong Kong
- Language: Cantonese
- Box office: HK$ 0.086 M. (Hong Kong)

Whispers and Moans (Chinese: 性工作者十日談) is a 2007 Hong Kong film directed by Herman Yau. It is based on the 2006 book Whispers and Moans by Yeeshan Yang, investigating the Hong Kong sex trade. It has a Category III rating in Hong Kong.

== Plot summary ==
Elsie (Yan Ng) is a social worker with an interest in the rights of sex workers, despite this she is naive as to the lives of prostitutes, and finds it impossible to be accepted into their milieu. This changes when she comes to the aid of nightclub hostess Happy (Chan Mei-hei). Happy introduces Elsie to her colleagues and Elsie is able to observe first hand the business of prostitution in Hong Kong.

At the top of the scale are those who become the long term mistresses of the wealthy, receiving a retainer and having their living expenses paid for, a step towards this being to be kept for a shorter term, for months or weeks. Nana (Mandy Chiang) and her sister Aida (Monie Tung) began their careers as underage prostitutes in an underground brothel, before graduating to become legal hostesses on turning 18. However Aida has become a drug addict and over a matter of days makes a descent that would normally occur over years. Those unable to leave the prostitute trade, as they grow older, work at small one woman brothels, with a much reduced rate for sex and a higher turnover of customers than that found at nightclubs. A very small number, such as Coco (Athena Chu), become mama-sans. However Aida's addiction is so great that she cannot work even as a brothel prostitute and instead becomes a street prostitute, normally the fate of much older women.

Also working the streets is the transgender Jo (Don Li) whose goal is to save up enough money for sex reassignment surgery, her boyfriend is Tony (Patrick Tang) who works as a male prostitute. One of Tony's customers is the mistress of a triad boss and the film ends with Tony's slaying.

== Cast and roles ==
- Athena Chu – Coco
- Candice Yu – Jenny
- Mandy Chiang – Nana
- Monie Tung – Aida
- Yan Ng – Elsie, the social worker
- Don Li – Jo
- Patrick Tang – Tony
- Chan Mei-hei
- Karen Tong
- Chik King-Man
- Ken Lo
- Cheung Chi-Kwong
- Emotion Cheung
- Cheung Wing-Hong
- Wong Tak-bun
- Wong Man-Wai
- Sherming Yiu

== Awards ==
Whispers and Moans received a "Film of Merit" award at the 2007 Hong Kong Film Critics Society Awards.

== See also ==
- True Women for Sale, a 2008 Hong Kong film directed by Herman Yau
