= Leave Me Alone (film) =

2004 Hong Kong film by Danny Pang

- The Hong Kong DVD cover.
- Directed by: Danny Pang
- Written by: Lung Wah-Shum; Curran Pang; Danny Pang
- Produced by: The Pang Brothers; Cub Chin Kong-Hon
- Starring: Ekin Cheng; Charlene Choi
- Cinematography: Wichien Reungwichayakul
- Edited by: Curran Pang
- Music by: Jadet Chawang; Payont Permsith
- Distributed by: Universe Laser (DVD)
- Release date: 18 November 2004
- Running time: 93 minutes
- Country: Hong Kong
- Language: Cantonese

Leave Me Alone (Chinese: 阿孖有難, "Ah, double in trouble" also, known as Ah ma yau nan) is a 2004 Hong Kong thriller film directed and co-written by Danny Pang. It stars Ekin Cheng in a dual role.

== Plot ==
Gay fashion designer Yiu Chun Man (Ekin Cheng) is visited in Hong Kong by his straight twin brother, Yiu Chun Kit (also Ekin Cheng). Kit borrows his brother's driver's license, and is then involved in a car crash in which a woman dies, and Kit falls into a coma.

With no ID card, Man is unable to prove his identity, so he assumes the identity of his brother, and takes up with Kit's girlfriend, Jane, (Charlene Choi), and goes with her to Thailand. Jane, however, is having some money problems, and is deeply indebted to a loan shark (Dayo Wong), who pursues Man and Jane.

Kit comes out of his coma and finds himself struggling to fend off the amorous advances of Man's boyfriend (Jan Lamb), who is a high-ranking Hong Kong police officer.

== Production and release ==
After the Pang brothers released The Eye 2 in 2024, the two brothers decided to work next on companion films. Linked by the same car accident, Leave Me Alone is a companion piece to Ab-normal Beauty, directed by Oxide Pang, which was also released in Hong Kong cinemas in November 2004. Cheng has an overlapping role in both films, and stated that this was his first film in which he played a dual role.

Leave Me Alone stars one half of the Hong Kong pop duo Twins.

Leave Me Alone was screened at the Deauville Asian Film Festival and the Tokyo International Film Festival.

It was released on DVD in Hong Kong (all region) by Universe Laser on 8 January 2005.

The film, as well as its companion film, have been subject of queer theory analysis on the topic of contemporary Thai cinema, as the film was partially produced and filmed in Thailand .

== See also ==
- Ab-normal Beauty
- Pang brothers
