= Ab-normal Beauty =

2004 Hong Kong film by Oxide Pang

- The Hong Kong theatrical poster.
- Directed by: Oxide Pang
- Written by: Oxide Pang; Thomas Pang
- Produced by: The Pang Brothers
- Starring: Race Wong; Rosanne Wong
- Cinematography: Decha Srimantra
- Edited by: Curran Pang
- Music by: Payont Permsith
- Distributed by: Tartan Films
- Release date: 4 November 2004
- Running time: 88 minutes
- Country: Hong Kong
- Language: Cantonese

Ab-normal Beauty (死亡寫真, "Photos of Death") (also Sei mong se jun) is a 2004 Hong Kong horror film directed and co-written by Oxide Pang. It stars Race Wong and Rosanne Wong of the Cantopop group 2R.

== Plot ==
Jiney, an art and photography student, wins an award for her work. Her male friend and co-student, Anson, congratulates her but she tells him that although she won an award, she is unhappy with the work. Her friend Jas, who she lives with, takes her from school on a 'date'. They go out to take photographs.

Jiney's mother tells her that she is going away on business for a month. Later, she witnesses a fatal car accident and takes photographs of it. She finds herself obsessed with death and begins to take photographs of more explicit death subjects - chickens being killed, fish being scaled, dead birds and others. She talks about suicide, and there are flashbacks to an apparent incident from her youth when she was sexually abused by some young boys.

== Cast ==
- Race Wong as Jiney
- Rosanne Wong as Jas
- Anson Leung as Anson
- Michelle Yim as Jiney's mother
- Cub Chin as Professor
- Ekin Cheng as Man in car crash

== See also ==
- Leave Me Alone (2004 thriller film)
