= 34th Hong Kong Film Awards =

2015 Hong Kong Film Awards

- Final revision poster modified by Hong Kong Film Awards Association
- Date: 19 April 2015
- Site: Hong Kong Cultural Centre
- Hosted by: Jordan Chan; Gordon Lam; Miriam Yeung
- Organized by: Hong Kong Film Awards Association Ltd

Highlights
- Most nominations: Overheard 3 (11)

The 34th Hong Kong Film Awards ceremony, honored the best films of 2014 and took place on 19 April 2015 at the Hong Kong Cultural Centre, Kowloon, Hong Kong. The ceremony was hosted by Jordan Chan, Gordon Lam, and Miriam Yeung, during the ceremony awards are presented in 19 categories and 1 Lifetime Achievement Award.

== Awards ==
Winners are listed first, highlighted in boldface, and indicated with a double dagger (‡).

**Best Film**: **Qin Hong — The Golden Era**‡; Amy Chin — The Midnight After; Pang Ho-cheung, Subi Liang, Chen Kuo-fu and Wang Zhonglei — Aberdeen; Jojo Hui — Dearest; Derek Yee and Ronald Wong — Overheard 3	**Best Director**: **Ann Hui — The Golden Era**‡; Fruit Chan — The Midnight After; Peter Chan — Dearest; Dante Lam — That Demon Within; Alan Mak and Felix Chong — Overheard 3
**Best Screenplay**: **Alan Mak and Felix Chong — Overheard 3**‡; Chan Fai-Hung, Kong Ho-Yan and Fruit Chan — The Midnight After; Pang Ho-cheung — Aberdeen; Li Qiang — The Golden Era; Zhang Ji — Dearest	**Best Actor**: **Sean Lau — Overheard 3**‡; Eddie Peng — Rise of the Legend; Sean Lau — Insanity; Huang Bo — Dearest; Daniel Wu — That Demon Within
**Best Actress**: **Zhao Wei — Dearest**‡; Sandra Ng — Golden Chicken SSS; Tang Wei — The Golden Era; Zhou Xun — Women Who Flirt; Charlene Choi — Sara	**Best Supporting Actor**: **Kenneth Tsang — Overheard 3**‡; Wang Baoqiang — Kung Fu Jungle; Lam Suet — The Midnight After; Ng Man-tat — Aberdeen; Alex Fong — Overheard 3
**Best Supporting Actress**: **Ivana Wong — Golden Chicken SSS**‡; Kara Wai — The Midnight After; Hao Lei — The Golden Era; Fiona Sit — Girls; Nina Paw — Insanity	**Best New Performer**: **Ivana Wong — Golden Chicken SSS**‡; Ivana Wong — Delete My Love; Ivana Wong — Break Up 100; Jacky Cai — Aberdeen; Candy Cheung — Dot 2 Dot
**Best Cinematography**: **Wang Yu — The Golden Era**‡; Zhao Fei — The Crossing; Lam Wah-Tsuen — The Midnight After; Ng Kai-Ming — Rise of the Legend; Anthony Pun — Overheard 3	**Best Film Editing**: **David Wu — The Crossing**‡; Manda Wai — The Golden Era; Cheung Ka-fai and Tang Man-To — Rise of the Legend; Patrick Tam and Curran Pang — That Demon Within; Curran Pang — Overheard 3
**Best Art Direction**: **Zhao Hai — The Golden Era**‡; Horace Ma — The Crossing; Man Lim-Chung — Aberdeen; Pater Wong — Rise of the Legend; Man Lim-Chung — Overheard 3	**Best Costume Make Up Design**: **Man Lim-Chung — The Golden Era**‡; Chen Tongxun — The Crossing; William Chang, Kenneth Yee, Guo Pei and Lee Pik-Kwan — The Monkey King; Boey Wong — Rise of the Legend; Man Lim-Chung — Overheard 3
**Best Action Choreography**: **Donnie Yen, Stephen Tung, Yuen Bun and Yan Hua** **— Kung Fu Jungle**‡; Ku Huen-Chiu — The Four 3; Stephen Tung — The White Haired Witch of Lunar Kingdom; Yuen Wo Ping — Once Upon a Time in Shanghai; Corey Yuen — Rise of the Legend	**Best Original Film Score**: **Ellen Loo and Veronica Lee — The Midnight After**‡; Taro Iwashiro — The Crossing; Peter Kam — Aberdeen; Eli Marshall — The Golden Era; Shigeru Umebayashi — Rise of the Legend
**Best Original Film Song**: **Destination — Aberdeen**‡; Composer: Anthony Wong and Jason Choi; Lyrics/Singer Wyman Wong Wai-Man; Never Say Breakup Again — Break Up 100; Composer: Comfort Chan; Lyrics Xiao Guang; Singer:Ivana Wong; Brand New Hong Kong — Golden Chicken SSS; Composer/Lyrics: My Little Airport; Singer: Nicole Au; Your Legend — Rise of the Legend; Composer/Lyrics: Ashin; Singer: Mayday; The Quiet Storm — Insanity; Composer: Leon Ko; Lyrics Chris Shum; Singer: Eason Chan	**Best Sound Design**: **Tu Duu-Chih — The Crossing**‡; Kinson Tsang and George Lee — Kung Fu Jungle; Kinson Tsang, George Lee, Yiu Chun-Hin and Steve Chan — Rise of the Legend; Phyllis Cheng and Ip Siu-Kei — That Demon Within; Kinson Tsang — Overheard 3
**Best Visual Effects**: **Victor Wong and Bryan Cheung — Rise of the Legend**‡; Enoch Chan — Kung Fu Jungle; David Ebner, Kevin Rafferty and Ding Li Bo — The Monkey King; Eric Tong, Ken Law, Lucky Tracy Hannah — The Midnight After; Alex Lim, Lin Chun-Yue and Yu Kwok-Leung — That Demon Within	**Best New Director**: **David Lee — Insanity**‡; Ruby Yang — My Voice, My Life; Amos Wong — Dot 2 Dot
**Best Film from Mainland and Taiwan**: **Coming Home (mainland China)** ‡; Black Coal, Thin Ice (mainland China); Paradise In Service (Taiwan); No Man’s Land (mainland China); Café. Waiting. Love (Taiwan)	**Professional Achievement**: **Lee Kwan-Lung**‡
