= Wu Dang (film) =

2012 Hong Kong-Chinese martial arts-fantasy film

- Film poster
- 大武当之天地密码
- Directed by: Patrick Leung
- Written by: Chan Khan
- Produced by: Chan Khan; David Wang
- Starring: Vincent Zhao; Yang Mi; Louis Fan; Dennis To; Xu Jiao
- Cinematography: Cheung Tung-leung
- Edited by: Cheung Ka-fai
- Music by: Lincoln Lo
- Production companies: Mei Ah Great Wall Media; Mei Ah Film Production
- Distributed by: Hua Tianxia Film Distribution Company; Mei Ah Entertainment
- Release dates: 6 July 2012 (China); 17 July 2012 (Hong Kong)
- Running time: 100 minutes
- Countries: Hong Kong; China
- Language: Mandarin

Wu Dang is a 2012 martial arts-fantasy film directed by Patrick Leung, starring Vincent Zhao, Yang Mi, Louis Fan, Dennis To and Xu Jiao. A Hong Kong-Chinese co-production, the film was first released in mainland China on 6 July 2012.

== Synopsis ==
The film is set in early Republican China. Tang Yunlong, an archaeology professor, returns from the United States to China, taking along his daughter, Tang Ning, with him.

Tang meets Paul Chen, an antique seller who deals in stolen artifacts. A fight breaks out when Tang seizes a treasure map from Chen. Tang defeats Chen's men and escapes with the map. The Tangs then make their way to the Wudang Mountains to attend a martial arts contest.

Elsewhere, on an aeroplane, Tianxin fights with other martial artists on board and steals an invitation card to attend the event at Wudang.

At Wudang, it is revealed that Tang and Tianxin are there for the same objective — to hunt for seven treasures hidden all over the Wudang Mountains. Tianxin wants only one of the seven, a sword, which she insists belonged to her family. Tang, on the other hand, is searching for a magic pill which can cure his daughter of a rare illness.

While hunting for the treasures, Tang Yunlong and Tianxin have several encounters and confrontations with the Wudang guardians keeping watch over the treasures, as well as with Chen and his men, who are also there for the treasures.

== Cast ==
- Vincent Zhao as Tang Yunlong
- Yang Mi as Tianxin
- Louis Fan as Shui Heyi
- Dennis To as Bailong
- Xu Jiao as Tang Ning
- Paw Hee-ching as Shui Heyi's mother
- Tam Chun-yin as Paul Chen

== Production ==
Wu Dang was directed by Patrick Leung, who previously directed films such as La Brassiere (2001) and The Twins Effect II (2004). The action scenes were choreographed by Corey Yuen, who also worked on The Twins Effect II with Leung.

The costumes in the film were designed by Emi Wada, who won the Academy Award for Best Costume Design in 1985.

Wu Dang marked the first time Yang Mi played a "fighter girl" in a martial arts film.

Louis Fan fractured his toe while performing a difficult stunt in one scene, but, despite his injury, he insisted on continuing until the shooting ended.

== Release ==
Vincent Zhao and Yang Mi attended a press event in Beijing on 30 May 2012 to promote the film. Wu Dang was released in mainland China on 6 July 2012 and in Hong Kong on 17 July 2012.

== Reception ==
Wan Xuming of Yangtze River Daily wrote, "Based on the immense response at the auditions held in Hengdian World Studios, the audience probably regard this film as one that showcases the grandeur of the Wudang Mountains."

On 16 July 2012, NetEase pointed out that the plot of Wu Dang not only closely resembles that of Tiandao Mima (天道密码), a novel by Sima Changxiao published in August 2011, but its Chinese title is also very similar to the novel's. This led to suspicions of plagiarism.
