= Arthur Wong =

Hong Kong cinematographer (born 1956)

- Born: July 2, 1956 (age 70); Hong Kong
- Years active: 1977–2022

Chinese name
- Traditional Chinese: 黃岳泰
- Simplified Chinese: 黃岳泰
Transcriptions

Arthur Wong Ngok-tai (Chinese: 黃岳泰, born 2 July 1956) is a Hong Kong cinematographer, filmmaker, and actor.

== Career ==
As a cinematographer, Wong was inspired by his father, who was himself a cinematographer in the 1950s and 1960s.

Wong is on the board of directors for the Hong Kong Film Awards Association, the vice-chairman of the Federation of Hong Kong Filmmakers, founder and Honorary Chairman of the Hong Kong Society of Cinematographers (HKSC) and Honorary Advisor (Film And Television) to the Vocational Training Council of Hong Kong.

Wong is known for using multi-camera setups, and being the first to film in high definition in Asia.

He holds the record of being the only person to win three consecutive years at the Hong Kong Film Awards, twice.

== Filmography ==
=== Cinematography ===
Year	Title	Director	Notes
1977	The Criminals 3: Arson	Shan Hua; Kuei Chih-Hung	Part 1
1977	The Criminals 5: The Teenager's Nightmare	Kuei Chih-Hung; Mou Tun-fei	With Chin-Chiang Ma
1978	The 36th Chamber of Shaolin	Lau Kar-leung	With Yueh-Tai Huang
1978	Wu long Ji Gong	Fung Wong	
1978	The Deadly Mantis	Lau Kar-leung	
1978	Lao Fu Zi ji cu lu	Fung Wong	
1978	Heroes of the East	Lau Kar-leung	
1979	The Spiritual Boxer Part II	Lau Kar-leung	
1979	Dirty Ho	Lau Kar-leung	With Chih Chun Ao
1979	Mad Monkey Kung Fu	Lau Kar-leung	
1979	Fists and Guts	Lau Kar-wing	Also writer
1980	Shaolin Warrior	Lau Kar-wing	
1981	Man on the Brink	Kwok-Ming Cheung	Shared credit with Kwok-Ming Cheung
1981	He fang shen sheng	Eric Tsang	
1981	Life After Life	Wai-Chuen Yung	
1982	Aces Go Places	Eric Tsang	With Chun-kit Chan, Ming Hoh and Pak-ying Yip
1982	Sha yu shao mai	James Yi Lui; David Wu	With Yuen Chi Siu and Pak-Ying Yip
1982	He Lives by Night	Po-Chih Leong	
1982	Crimson Street	David Lai	
1983	Aces Go Places 2	Eric Tsang	With Kevan Lind
1983	Meng	Chuk-Chiu Chan; Angela Mak; Yueming Shen	With Paul Chan and Bing-Tong Yeung
1983	Esprit d'amour	Ringo Lam	
1983	The Lost Generation	Liu Chia-chang	
1984	Crazy Kung Fu Master	Dennis Yu	
1984	Wheels on Meals	Sammo Hung	With Yiu-Tsou Cheung and Francisco Riba
1984	The Owl vs. Bumbo	Sammo Hung	
1985	My Lucky Stars	Sammo Hung	
1985	Twinkle Twinkle Lucky Stars	Sammo Hung	
1985	Heart of Dragon	Sammo Hung	
1985	Kong woo liu duen	Taylor Wong	
1985	Wo yuan yi	Ga-Ho Lau	With Bing-Tong Yeung
1986	18 Golden Destroyers	Gordon Chan	
1986	The Strange Bedfellow	Alfred Cheung; Kin Lo; Eric Tsang	With Sing Tung Cheung
1986	The Millionaire's Express	Sammo Hung	
1986	Where's Officer Tuba?	Philip Chan; Ricky Lau	
1986	Mr. Vampire II	Ricky Lau	
1986	Armour of God	Jackie Chan; Eric Tsang (Uncredited)	With Bob Thompson, Cheung Yiu Jo and Peter Ngor
1986	Evil Cat	Dennis Yu	
1987	Vampire's Breakfast	Chung Wang	
1987	Eastern Condors	Sammo Hung	
1987	Miracles	Jackie Chan	
1989	Spiritually a Cop	Wai Shum	
1990	A Chinese Ghost Story 2	Ching Siu-tung	
1991	Armour of God II: Operation Condor	Jackie Chan	
1991	The Raid	Ching Siu-tung; Tsui Hark	
1991	Once Upon a Time in China	Tsui Hark	
1991	A Kid From Tibet	Yuen Biao	With Tung-Chuen Chan
1992	Twin Dragons	Ringo Lam; Tsui Hark	With Wing-Hang Wong
1992	Once Upon a Time in China II	Tsui Hark	
1992	New Dragon Gate Inn	Raymond Lee; Ching Siu-tung (Uncredited); Tsui Hark (Uncredited)	With Moon-Tong Lau
1992	Moon Warriors	Sammo Hung	
1993	Once Upon a Time in China IV	Bun Yuen	
1993	Crime Story	Kirk Wong; Jackie Chan (Uncredited)	
1993	Days of Tomorrow	Jeffrey Lau	
1993	Iron Monkey	Yuen Woo-ping	With Chi-Wai Tam
1993	Temptation of a Monk	Clara Law	With Andrew Lesnie
1993	The Black Panther Warriors	Clarence Fok	
1994	Erotique	Clara Law	Segment "Wonton Soup"
1994	A Confucian Confusion	Edward Yang	With Chan Chang, Wu-Hsiu Hung and Lung-Yu Li
1994	Love and the City	Jeffrey Lau	
1994	The Returning	Jacob Cheung	
1995	A Touch of Evil	Tony Au	
1995	The Adventurers	Ringo Lam	With Ardy Lam
1996	Somebody Up There Likes Me	Patrick Leung	
1996	The Age of Miracles	Peter Chan	
1996	Tristar	Tsui Hark	With Christopher Doyle
1996	Big Bullet	Benny Chan	
1996	Beyond Hypothermia	Jeong-il Choi; Ki-bong Du; Patrick Leung; Baek-gyeon Yang	With Yat-Man Cheung and Il-man Jeong
1996	God of Gamblers 3: The Early Stage	Wong Jing	
1996	Back for Your Life	Chris Kin-Sang Li	With Peter Ngor Chi-Kwan and Chi-Wai Tam
1997	The Soong Sisters	Mabel Cheung	
1998	Hitman	Stephen Tung	
1998	Knock Off	Tsui Hark	
1998	Sleepless Town	Chi-Ngai Lee	
1998	City of Glass	Mabel Cheung	With Jingle Ma
1999	Gen-X Cops	Benny Chan	
1999	Purple Storm	Teddy Chan	
2000	2000 AD	Gordon Chan	
2001	The Gua Sha Treatment	Zheng Xiaolong	
2001	Visible Secret	Ann Hui	
2002	Double Vision	Chen Kuo-fu	
2003	Traces of a Dragon	Mabel Cheung	Documentary film
2003	Truth or Dare: 6th Floor Rear Flat	Wong Chun-chun	Also producer
2003	The Medallion	Gordon Chan	
2003	The Floating Landscape	Miu-Suet Lai	Also producer
2004	Magic Kitchen	Chi-Ngai Lee	
2004	Bamboo Shoot	Xin Lee	
2006	Ultraviolet	Kurt Wimmer	
2006	Chingaso the Clown	Elias Matar	Short film
2006	Silk	Chao-Bin Su	
2007	The Warlords	Peter Chan	
2008	Painted Skin	Gordon Chan	
2009	Bodyguards and Assassins	Teddy Chan	
2009	The King of Fighters	Gordon Chan	
2010	Here Comes Fortune	James Yuen	With Andy Kwong; Also producer
2010	East Wind Rain	Yunlong Liu	
2011	A Chinese Fairy Tale	Wilson Yip	
2012	Painted Skin: The Resurrection	Wuershan	
2013	Crimes of Passion	Gao Qunshu	
2013	Pay Back	Fu Xi	Also producer
2014	One Step Away	Baogang Zhao	
2016	League of Gods	Koan Hui	
2017	Legend of the Naga Pearls	Lei Yang	

=== Director ===
- The Fool Escape (1980) (Also writer)
- In the Line of Duty III (1988)
- Ulterior Motive (2015)
- Beating Heart (2022)

=== Acting credits ===
Year	Title	Role
1996	Viva Erotica	
1998	Beast Cops	Tai Ge
1999	The Final Night of the Royal Hong Kong Police	
2001	Born Wild	Ng
2002	Demi-Haunted	Gangster
2003	Infernal Affairs II	Wah
2006	Silk	Sheriff
2014	Gangster Payday	

== Awards and nominations ==
Hong Kong Film Awards

Year	Category	Title	Result
1981	Best Cinematography	Life After Life	Won
1982	Best Cinematography	He Lives by Night	Won
1989	Best Cinematography	Miracles	Nominated
1991	Best Cinematography	Once Upon a Time in China	Nominated
1992	Best Cinematography	Once Upon a Time in China II	Nominated
1992	Best Cinematography	New Dragon Gate Inn	Nominated
1993	Best Cinematography	Temptation of a Monk	Nominated
1993	Best Cinematography	Days of Tomorrow	Nominated
1994	Best Cinematography	The Returning	Nominated
1995	Best Cinematography	A Touch of Evil	Nominated
1996	Best Cinematography	Somebody Up There Likes Me	Nominated
1996	Best Cinematography	Big Bullet	Nominated
1997	Best Cinematography	The Soong Sisters	Won
1998	Best Cinematography	Sleepless Town	Won
1999	Best Cinematography	Gen-X Cops	Nominated
1999	Best Cinematography	Purple Storm	Won
2001	Best Cinematography	Visible Secret	Won
2002	Best Cinematography	Double Vision	Nominated
2003	Best Cinematography	The Floating Landscape	Won
2007	Best Cinematography	The Warlords	Won
2009	Best Cinematography	Painted Skin	Won
2009	Best Cinematography	Bodyguards and Assassins	Won

Golden Horse Film Festival and Awards

Year	Category	Title	Result
1981	Best Cinematography	Life After Life	Nominated
1992	Best Cinematography	New Dragon Gate Inn	Nominated
1993	Best Cinematography	Temptation of a Monk	Nominated
1997	Best Cinematography	The Soong Sisters	Nominated
1998	Best Cinematography	Sleepless Town	Won
2009	Best Cinematography	Painted Skin	Nominated
2009	Best Cinematography	Bodyguards and Assassins	Nominated
