= Good Times, Bed Times =

2003 Hong Kong film by Chan Hing-ka and Patrick Leung

- Film poster
- Traditional Chinese: 戀上你的床
- Simplified Chinese: 恋上你的床
- Hanyu Pinyin: Liàn Shàng Nǐ De Chuáng
- Jyutping: Lyun2 Seong5 Nei2 Dik1 Cong4
- Directed by: Chan Hing-Ka; Patrick Leung
- Written by: Chan Hing-Ka; Debbie Lam
- Produced by: Chan Hing-Ka; Tiffany Chen; Amy Chin; Janet Chun
- Starring: Sammi Cheng; Louis Koo; Sean Lau; Charlene Choi; Tony Leung; Sandra Ng
- Cinematography: Cheung Man Po
- Edited by: Cheung Ka-fai
- Music by: Anthony Chue
- Distributed by: China Star Entertainment Group
- Release date: 25 July 2003
- Running time: 105 minutes
- Country: Hong Kong
- Language: Cantonese
- Box office: HK$20 million

Good Times, Bed Times (戀上你的床, Luen seung ngei dik chong) is a 2003 Hong Kong romantic comedy film starring Sammi Cheng, Louis Koo, Sean Lau, Charlene Choi, with guest appearances by Tony Leung and Sandra Ng.

== Cast ==
- Sammi Cheng as Carrie Wat
- Louis Koo as Inspector Paul Ko Chi-keung
- Sean Lau as Magistrate Raymond
- Charlene Choi as Tabby
- Tony Leung Ka-fai as Boss Ike Hung
- Sandra Ng as BoBo Au
- Jim Chim as Uncle Lam
- Tats Lau as Tabby's father
- Lee Lik-chi as Paul's superior
- Lam Suet as Judge Chow
- Pinky Cheung as P
- Raymond Wong Yuk-man as Magazine chief
- Philip Chan as Superintendent
- Chui Tien-you as Basketball interviewee
- Wong You-nam as Basketball interviewee
- Maggie Lau as Policewoman in TV commercial
- Zhuge Boli as Japanese AV muscle man
- Niki Chow as Peggy
- Helen Ma as Female PTU
- Gloria Chan as Female CID
- Angela Au as Female SDU
- Elaine Ho as Female traffic police
- Serena Po as Policewoman
- Six Luk as Tuition teacher
- Yeung Wong-fook as Yakuza's representative
- Leung Kin-chuen as Shooter
- Poon Hang-sang as District Judge
- Vincent Chik as SDU

== Reception ==
Comparing the film to La Brassiere, an earlier creative collaboration by the creative team Hing-Ka Chan, Patrick Leung, and Amy Chin, Derek Elley of Variety wrote that Good Times, Bed Times was "less vaudevillian in its humor, but with a stronger pair of distaff thesps this time round", as "the joke comes from casting matinee idol Koo as a sexual non-achiever and Lau, not a prototype romantic lead, as an incurable lothario".

Variety reported that the film "grossed a sturdy HK$20 million ($2.5 million)" from its summer 2003 Hong Kong theatrical release.

The film was initially banned in Malaysia, then reworked and released there under the title In Love With You.
