= Mighty Baby (film) =

2002 Hong Kong film by Chan Hing-ka and Patrick Leung

- Film poster
- Traditional Chinese: 絕世好B
- Simplified Chinese: 绝世好B
- Hanyu Pinyin: Jué Shì Hǎo B
- Jyutping: Zyut6 Sai3 Ho2 B
- Directed by: Chan Hing-ka; Patrick Leung
- Written by: Chan Hing-ka; Amy Chin
- Produced by: Chan Hing-ka; Amy Chin
- Starring: Lau Ching-wan; Louis Koo; Cecilia Cheung; Gigi Leung; Rosamund Kwan; Carina Lau
- Cinematography: Fletcher Poon
- Edited by: Chan Kei-hop
- Music by: Chiu Tsang-hei; Anthony Chue
- Production companies: One Hundred Years of Film; Icon Film Company
- Distributed by: China Star Entertainment
- Release date: 9 August 2002
- Language: Cantonese
- Box office: HK$19,021,894

Mighty Baby (Chinese: 絕世好B) is a 2002 Hong Kong comedy film directed by Chan Hing-ka and Patrick Leung. A sequel to the 2001 film, La Brassiere, the film stars returning cast members Lau Ching-wan, Louis Koo, Carina Lau and Gigi Leung alongside new cast members Cecilia Cheung and Rosamund Kwan

== Synopsis ==
In this sequel to the La Brassiere, Lena (Gigi Leung), Johnny (Lau Ching-wan) and Wayne (Louis Koo) are tasked with developing the "Mighty B" line of baby products. Since the last successful development of the "Mighty Bra", Johnny is now head of the department, he hires a neurotic secretary Sabrina (Rosamund Kwan). Lena and Wayne are planning their wedding, however, Wayne has "Baby-Phobia" which throws a wrench into their task of developing the premier "Mighty B" line of baby products. Lena hires child behavior expert Boey (Cecilia Cheung), to work with Wayne to overcome his phobia but things start to go awry when Wayne starts developing feelings for Boey.

== Cast and roles ==
- Lau Ching-wan as Johnny Hung
- Louis Koo as Wayne Koo
- Gigi Leung as Lena Li
- Rosamund Kwan as Sabrina
- Cecilia Cheung as Boey
- Carina Lau as Samantha (special appearance)
- Chikako Aoyama as Nanako
- Rosemary Vandenbroucke as Eileen
- GC Goo-Bi as Gigi
- Chapman To as Kassey
- Jim Chim as Dr. Raymond Kim
- Tats Lau as Romeo
- Lam Tsz-sin as pickpocket in mall
- Cherrie Ying as Ginger
- Vincent Kok as Dr. Ringo Li
- Wilson Yip as Officer Yip
- Rachel Ngan as Emma
- Kate Yeung as Lin Lin
- Ng Choi-yuk as Yuko
- Ann Ho as Amy
- Yip Chi-ting as Mannie
- Chun Lam as Leo's mother
- Kong Sze-sze as Mrs. Lee
- Marco Lok as Ken
- Jin Hui as Eric
- Priscilla Wong as Lily
- Wong Hoi-chi as Connie
- Leung hoi-ling as Lisa
- Barbara Wong as job applicant in red
- Julie as job applicant in peach
- Karen Yip as receptionist
- Ito Koyo as Lena's secretary
- Takahashi Ayumi as Nanako's secretary
- Touta Tarumi as Chairman
- Kamiyama Norihisa as chairman's secretary
- Nakayama as Failed Japanese businessman
- Cheung Hoi-yee as Baby Siu-wai's mother
- Winnie Lam as Co. hired mother
- Cheung Ying-yan as Co. hired mother
- Merrick Holmes as Co. hired baby
- Kwok Ho-hei as Co. hired baby
- So Wing-yan as Baby in purple worm
- Yu Kwan-shui as hospital secretary
- Asuka Higuchi as Suki
