= Patrick Leung =

Hong Kong filmmaker (born 1959)

- 梁栢堅
- Born: Leung Pak-kin; 1959 (age 66–67); Hong Kong
- Education: Hong Kong Baptist College (Hon Dip)
- Occupation: Filmmaker
- Years active: 1984–present
- Children: 1

Patrick Leung Pak-kin (Chinese: 梁栢堅; born 1959) is a Hong Kong filmmaker. After graduating from university in 1982, he joined Cinema City Enterprises and began working as John Woo's assistant director, on films including A Better Tomorrow (1986), The Killer (1989), and Hard Boiled (1992). He also co-wrote Bullet in the Head (1990) with Woo.

Leung made his directorial debut in 1996 with Somebody Up There Likes Me, and went on to direct films including La Brassiere, Born Wild (both 2001), The Twins Effect II (2004), and Wu Dang (2012). He also continued collaborating with Woo as second unit director on the two-part epics Red Cliff (2008–2009) and The Crossing (2014–2015). In 2026, his film Ciao UFO won Best Film and earned him Best Director in the 44th Hong Kong Film Awards.

== Early life and education ==
Leung was born in 1959 in Hong Kong. He studied film at the School of Communication of Hong Kong Baptist College, where he was classmates with film producer Amy Chin. During his studies, he worked as a script supervision intern for John Woo's 1982 film To Hell with the Devil. He graduated in 1982, and he briefly worked at an advertising company for three months after graduation before joining the film studio Cinema City Enterprises.

== Career ==
=== Early ventures (1984–2007) ===
After joining Cinema City Enterprises, Leung was sent to Taiwan for a year as Woo's assistant director, where they made Run, Tiger, Run and The Time You Need a Friend. Leung continued to collaborate closely with Woo as his assistant director, and they went on to make A Better Tomorrow, A Better Tomorrow II, and The Killer. Leung said that, since Woo was taciturn, he usually learned from him by "standing behind him and observing how he staged scenes and directed actors". He later worked on the screenplay for the 1990 film Bullet in the Head with Woo and Janet Chun, and he and Woo decided to cast Jacky Cheung in the lead role despite his background as a singer. Leung then worked on another of Woo's films, Once a Thief, serving as both assistant director and second unit director for the location shooting in France, where they collaborated with the French stunt driving team led by Rémy Julienne. He also co-wrote the screenplay for the action film Tiger Cage 3, and collaborated with Woo once again on Hard Boiled.

In 1996, Leung made his directorial debut with Somebody Up There Likes Me, starring Aaron Kwok and Carmen Lee. Film critic Li Cheuk-to found the film to possess "a rarely high level of overall production quality in Hong Kong cinema", writing that Leung "already displayed the bearing of a seasoned director in his debut, accurately and pleasingly integrating the professionalism of each technical department", although he noted that it lacked "a personal style". The film also received one Golden Horse Awards nomination and two Hong Kong Film Awards nominations. He released his second feature, Beyond Hypothermia, the same year, with Derek Elley of Variety praising his "striking ability to conjure up a rarefied emotional atmosphere through music, visuals and editing". In 1997, Leung directed the action film Task Force, which Elley again praised for "weav[ing] his trademark dreamlike quality into the emotional fabric". Film scholar David Bordwell also found that Leung had "paid his tribute to tradition by assigning a different style to each action scene", citing influences from Woo's gun fu, traditional wuxia films, and kung fu comedies.

Leung went on to co-direct the 2001 film La Brassiere with Chan Hing-kai. The film became a commercial success for China Star Entertainment Group. He also released Born Wild that same year, although Ted Shen of the Chicago Reader reviewed it negatively, writing that Leung "spends more time posing his actors than directing them, and the film's visual energy and stylized soft-core sex fail to mask its trite plot and Neanderthal misogyny". In 2002, he released two more features, Mighty Baby and Demi-Haunted, with the former also performing well at the summer box office. He collaborated with Chan Hing-kai again on the 2003 film Good Times, Bed Times and with Corey Yuen on The Twins Effect II in 2004. In 2006, he released the Japanese-Hong Kong-Thai co-produced anthology film Black Night, with Russell Edwards of Variety praising him as "in top form". He directed the comedy film Simply Actors in 2007, before transitioning his career to mainland China.

=== Cross-border careers (2008–present) ===
Leung later collaborated with John Woo again on the Chinese-Hong Kong co-production Red Cliff, serving as second unit director for the naval battle scenes while Zhang Jinzhan handled the army battle scenes. (Note: Oriental Morning Post reported him as an action choreographer.) During a reshoot at Xiaotangshan, Beijing, for Red Cliff: Part 2, which Leung supervised, two ships collided and caught fire, causing one death and six injuries. In 2010, Leung, on behalf of Woo's company, was commissioned to make a film for the 2010 Asian Games around April, with the film scheduled for release before the Games opened in August. Leung recruited Rico Chung to write a screenplay about dragon boat racing and completed the film Breaking The Waves within four months. He later directed the co-production film Wu Dang in 2012, and again served as second unit director for Woo on the two-part historical epic The Crossing and the 2017 action film Manhunt.

Leung was brought on board the Hong Kong film Ciao UFO in 2017 by Amy Chin, who served as the film's screenwriter and producer. The film premiered at the Hong Kong Asian Film Festival in 2019, but due to disputes with the distributor, it was unable to secure a theatrical release until the contract expired in 2025. During the COVID-19 pandemic, Leung went without work for three years, leading his family to suggest that he change careers. In 2024, he became a part-time lecturer at the Academy of Film of Hong Kong Baptist University, where he taught in its MFA programs. Ciao UFO began limited screenings in December 2025. The film won Best Film, while Leung received Best Director in the 44th Hong Kong Film Awards in 2026.

== Personal life ==
During Leung's filmmaking career in Taiwan, he lived on Dunhua South Road. Leung is married and has a daughter.

== Filmography ==
=== As director ===
Year	Title	Notes/Ref.
1996	Somebody Up There Likes Me	
1996	Beyond Hypothermia	
1997	Task Force	
2001	La Brassiere	
2001	Born Wild	
2002	Mighty Baby	
2002	Demi-Haunted	
2003	Good Times, Bed Times	
2004	The Twins Effect II	
2006	Black Night	
2007	Simply Actors	
2010	Breaking The Waves	
2012	Wu Dang	
2019	Ciao UFO	

=== Other credits ===
Year	Title	Assistant director	Second unit director	Notes/Ref.
1982	To Hell with the Devil	No	No	As intern
1984	Run, Tiger, Run	Yes	No	
1984	Happy Ghost	No	No	As executive producer
1985	The Time You Need a Friend	Yes	No	
1985	Happy Ghost II	No	No	As executive producer
1986	A Better Tomorrow	Yes	No	
1987	A Better Tomorrow II	Yes	No	
1989	The Killer	Yes	No	
1990	Bullet in the Head	No	No	As screenwriter
1991	Once a Thief	Yes	Yes	
1991	Tiger Cage 3	No	No	As screenwriter
1992	Hard Boiled	Yes	No	
2008	Red Cliff: Part 1	No	Yes	Second unit for naval battles
2009	Red Cliff: Part 2	No	Yes	Second unit for naval battles
2014	The Crossing: Part 1	No	Yes	
2015	The Crossing: Part 2	No	Yes	
2017	Manhunt	No	Yes	

== Awards and nominations ==
Year	Award	Category	Work	Result	Ref.
2026	32nd Hong Kong Film Critics Society Awards	Best Director	Ciao UFO	Nominated	
2026	21st Hong Kong Film Directors' Guild Awards	Best Director	Ciao UFO	Won	
2026	44th Hong Kong Film Awards	Best Director	Ciao UFO	Won	
