= Crimes of Passion (2013 film) =

2013 film

- Film poster
- Directed by: Gao Qunshu
- Written by: Gao Qunshu; Xin Huo; Haicheng Zhao
- Produced by: Zheng Xin
- Starring: Angelababy; Huang Xiaoming; Wei Zi; Su Qing; Jae Hee; Cao Wei-Yu
- Cinematography: Arthur Wong
- Edited by: Fei Chen; Dong Yu
- Music by: Nan Shu
- Production company: China Film Group Corporation
- Distributed by: China Film Group Corporation
- Release date: August 8, 2013
- Running time: 114 minutes
- Country: China
- Language: Mandarin

Crimes of Passion (Chinese: 一場風花雪月的事) is a 2013 Chinese romance film directed by Gao Qunshu. It is a remake of the 1997 smash-hit TV series A Sentimental Story.

== Plot ==
In the summer of 2008, a long-missing golden Buddha statue, regarded as a Chinese national treasure, resurfaces in the possession of the Kim family, a Korean criminal organization. Jeong-hee, the family's younger son, flees to Shenzhen, China, to escape a conflict involving his family. Police officer Lu Yueyue (Angelababy) is assigned to protect Jeong-hee while secretly investigating the whereabouts of the statue. As the two face threats from rival gangsters, they develop romantic feelings for each other, complicating Yueyue's relationship with her boyfriend and fellow police officer Xue Yu (Huang Xiaoming). Jeong-hee initially agrees to cooperate with the police but subsequently disappears with the statue under arrangements made by his older brother. During his absence, Yueyue and Xue Yu begin to reconcile. Jeong-hee later returns and hands the statue over to the authorities, leaving Yueyue conflicted over her feelings for the two men.

== Cast ==
- Angelababy as Yueyue
- Jae Hee as Jeong-hee
- Huang Xiaoming as Xue Yu
- Wei Zi
- Su Qing
- Cao Wei-Yu
- Meng Tingyi as 小马
