= Sean Lau =

Hong Kong actor (born 1964)

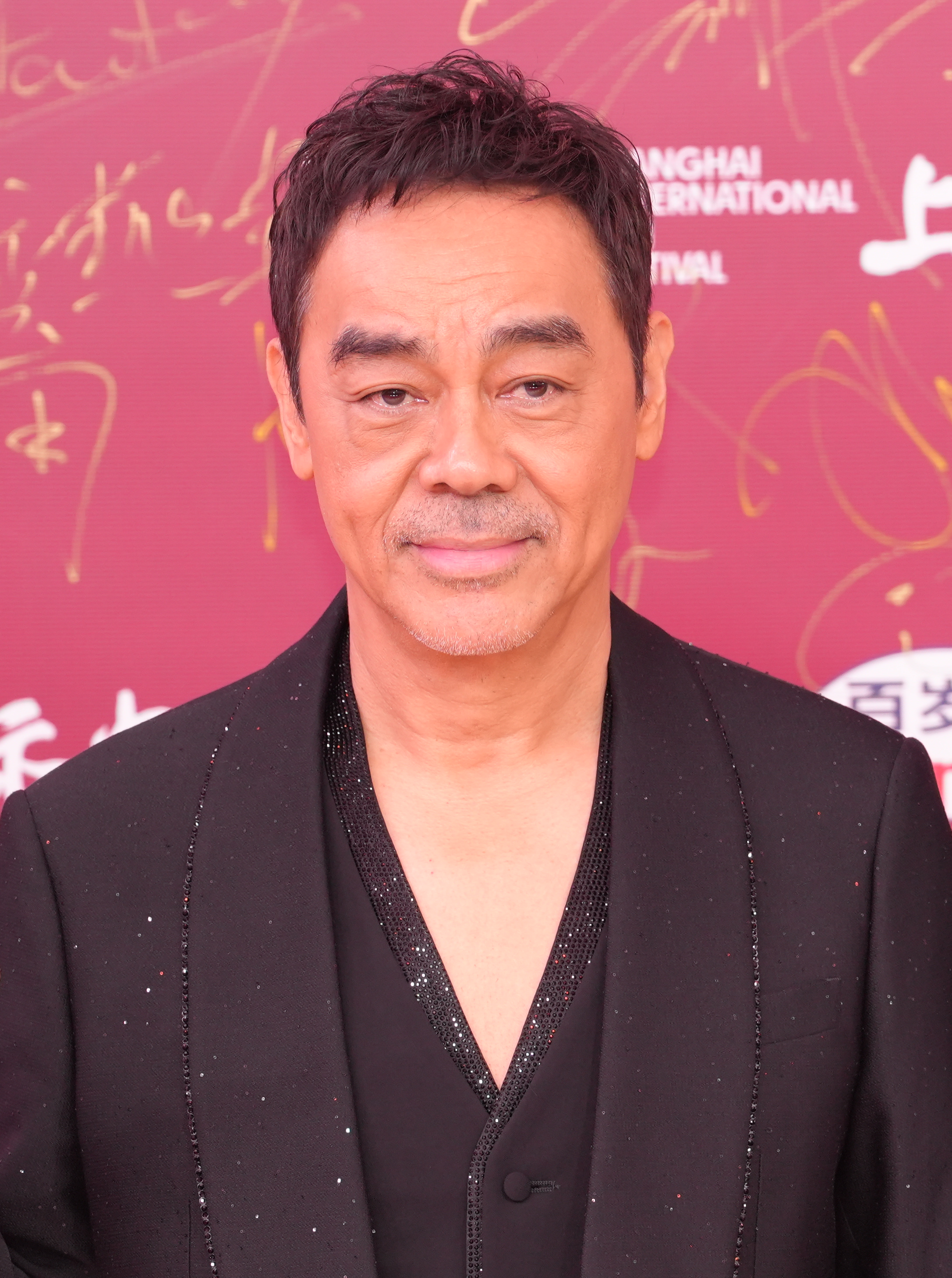
- Lau in 2026
- Born: 16 February 1964 (age 62); British Hong Kong
- Spouse: Amy Kwok
- Awards: Hong Kong Film Awards – Best Actor; 2007 My Name Is Fame; 2015 Overheard 3; 2023 Detective vs Sleuths; 2025 Papa Golden Bauhinia Awards – Best Actor; 2000 Where a Good Man Goes; 2007 My Name Is Fame Hong Kong Film Critics Society Awards – Best Actor; 1997 Full Alert; 2001 La Brassiere; 2011 Life Without Principle; 2014 Overheard 3; 2024 Papa Golden Horse Awards – Best Actor; 2012 Life Without Principle

Chinese name
- Traditional Chinese: 劉青雲
- Simplified Chinese: 刘青云
Transcriptions
Standard Mandarin
- Hanyu Pinyin: Liu Qing Yun
Yue: Cantonese
- Jyutping: Lau Ching Wan

Sean Lau Ching-wan (born 16 February 1964) is a Hong Kong actor. He is best known for starring in the films C'est la vie, mon chéri (1993), My Name Is Fame (2006), Mad Detective (2007), Overheard film series (2009–2014), and Life Without Principle (2011), for which he won the Golden Horse Award for Best Leading Actor. For his performance in Detective vs Sleuths (2022), he won the Hong Kong Film Award for Best Actor. In 2025, he won a Hong Kong Film Award, a Hong Kong Film Critics Society Award, an Asian Film Award and an Asia Pacific Screen Award for his performance in Papa (2024).

== Career ==
Lau was born in Hong Kong in 1964. He joined the TVB acting classes in 1983 and made his first appearance on television in the following year in the drama Draw Out the Rainbow. Dark-skinned with no matinee-idol look, he struggled with minor roles until the immensely popular stock market drama The Greed of Man (1992), where he first achieved his leading man status, and acted opposite Adam Cheng. His wife, Amy Kwok, who won the Miss Hong Kong Pageant in 1991, is also a well-known former television actress and co-starred with him on The Greed of Man. Lau starred in two series with ATV in 1991 and again in 2000.

Lau made his film debut in 1986 and since then has been cast in numerous roles. His critically acclaimed roles include acting opposite Anita Yuen as a down-and-out musician in C'est la vie, mon chéri (1993) and in a number of cop thrillers such as Big Bullet (1996), Full Alert (1997), The Longest Nite (1998), Running out of Time (1999), Running Out of Time 2 (2001) and Mad Detective (2007).

Lau is known for his versatility as an actor, having acted in a variety of genres.

Lau joined Milkyway Image production house in the mid-1990s.

== Personal life ==
Lau is married to Miss Hong Kong 1991 Amy Kwok Oi Ming.

== Filmography ==
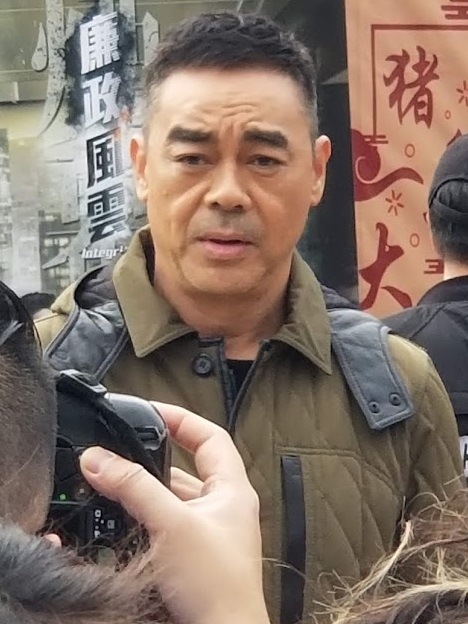
Lau in 2019

=== Film ===
Year	English title	Original title	Role	Notes
1986	Silent Love	聽不到的說話	Kelly Mak	
1988	Set Me Free!	我要逃亡		
1988	Police Story 2	警察故事續集	CID in restaurant	
1989	Live Hard	鐵膽雄風	Fai / Chief	
1989	My Dear Son	我要富貴	Maddy	
1991	The Roar of the Vietnamese	越青	Fan Wan-tin	
1992	Angel Hunter	女校風雲之邪教入侵	Jack Chow Man-kit	
1992	The Happy Massage Girls	快樂按摩女郎		
1992	Tulips in August	八月鬱金香		
1992	The Shootout	危險情人	Liu	
1993	Thou Shalt Not Swear	七月十四	Chow's sidekick	
1993	C'est la vie, mon chéri	新不了情	Kit	
1993	Executioners	現代豪俠傳	Tak	
1993	The Gods Must Be Crazy IV	香港也瘋狂 / 非洲先生	John	alternative title: Crazy Hong Kong
1993	All Men Are Brothers: Blood of the Leopard	水滸傳之英雄本色	Tso Wu	
1993	Pink Bomb	人生得意衰盡歡	Daniel	
1994	Bomb Disposal Officer: Baby Bomb	拆彈專家寶貝炸彈	Peter Chan	
1994	I Wanna Be Your Man!!!	神探磨轆 / 聰明笨探	Liu Che-mo	
1994	The Most Wanted	龍虎新風雲	Black Cat / Ho Chi-yung	
1994	Don't Shoot Me, I'm Just a Violinist!	山雞變鳳凰	Mozart	
1994	Oh! My Three Guys	三個相愛的少年	Ching Yu-hoi	
1994	Beginner's Luck	運財童子 / 狂賭一族出頭天	Mark	
1994	Tears and Triumph	昨夜長風	Xie Shi-wen	
1994	The Tragic Fantasy - Tiger of Wanchai	醉生夢死的灣仔之虎	Dee	alternative title: The Tragic Fantasy - Tiger of Waichai
1994	Return to a Better Tomorrow	新英雄本色	Lobster Tsui	
1994	Shanghai Fever	股瘋	Alan Tam	
1994	The Third Full Moon	正月十五之一生一世	Inspector Lau	
1994	Hello! Who Is It?	喂，搵邊位？	Officer Ma Fai	
1994	I've Got You, Babe!!!	播種情人	Charcoal Lau	
1994	It's a Wonderful Life	大富之家	Hou Chung	
1995	Sea Root	海根 / 後現代男女	Sea Root	
1995	The Golden Girls	山水有相逢	Chun Wai	
1995	Romantic Dream	追女仔95之綺夢	Hung Chi-lung	
1995	Loving You	無味神探	Lau Chun-hoi	
1995	Once in a Lifetime	終身大事	Kei-on	
1995	Happy Hour	歡樂時光	Chong Tsang	
1995	Tricky Business	整蠱王	Ko Hing	
1995	Mother of a Different Kind	不一樣的媽媽	Cheung Hung	
1995	Mack the Knife	流氓醫生	Chiu	alternative title: Dr. Mack
1995	Only Fools Fall in Love	呆佬拜壽 / 新威龍闖天關—傻瓜與野丫頭	Chiu Ford	
1995	New Tenant	新房客	Joe	Cameo
1995	The World of Treasure	富貴人間	Lion Dancer	alternative title: Land of Treasure; Cameo
1996	Viva Erotica	色情男女 / 聲色男女	Yee Tung-sing	
1996	Black Mask	黑俠	Shek Wai-ho	
1996	Muto Bontie	摩登菩呢提 / 錯體陽謀	Lam Chak-chi	
1996	Big Bullet	衝鋒隊─怒火街頭 / EU衝鋒隊	Sergeant Bill Chu	alternative title: EU Strike Force
1996	Tristar	大三元	Lau Ching-fatt	
1996	Beyond Hypothermia	攝氏32度	Long	
1997	Full Alert	高度戒備	Inspector Pao	
1997	Too Many Ways to Be No. 1	一個字頭的誕生	Kau	
1997	Final Justice	最後判決	Father Li Chi-ho	
1997	Lifeline	十萬火急 / 烈火雄心119	Chief Yau Sui	
1997	My Dad Is a Jerk!	對不起，多謝你	Li Lap-cheong	
1998	A Hero Never Dies	真心英雄	Martin	
1998	Expect the Unexpected	非常突然	Sam	
1998	Step Into the Dark	夜半無人屍語時	Dr. Care Kwan	
1998	The Longest Nite	暗花 / 暗花之殺人條件	Tony	alternative title: The Longest Night
1999	The Victim	目露凶光	Manson Ma	
1999	The H.K. Triad	O記三合會檔案	Ho	alternative title: The Hong Kong Triad
1999	Where a Good Man Goes	再見阿郎	Michael Cheung	
1999	Running Out of Time	暗戰	Inspector Ho Sheung-sang	
2001	Lunch with Charles	與查理斯午餐	Tong	
2001	Running Out of Time 2	暗戰2	Inspector Ho Sheung-sang	
2001	La Brassiere	絕世好Bra	Johnny	
2002	Fat Choi Spirit	嚦咕嚦咕新年財	Ching Wan	
2002	Mighty Baby	絕世好B	Johnny Hung	
2002	My Left Eye Sees Ghosts	我左眼見到鬼	Ken Wong / Sam Wong	
2003	1:99 Shorts	1:99 電影行動 / 一比九十九電影行動		alternative title: 1:99 Short Film Series
2003	Lost in Time	忘不了	Hale	
2003	Good Times, Bed Times	戀上你的床	Magistrate Raymond	
2003	Colour of the Truth	黑白森林	7 Up	
2004	Three of a Kind	煎釀三寶	Frankie	
2004	The Attractive One	身驕肉貴	Hugo	
2004	Driving Miss Wealthy	絕世好賓 / 窈窕淑女	Mario	
2004	Itchy Heart	七年很癢 / 7年很癢	Poon Chi-man	
2004	Fantasia	鬼馬狂想曲	Director Man	
2005	Himalaya Singh	喜馬拉亞星	Panic	
2006	The Shopaholics	最愛女人購物狂 / 購物狂	Choosey Lee Kan-yan	
2006	My Name Is Fame	我要成名	Poon Kar-fai	
2007	Mad Detective	神探	Chan Kwai-bun	
2009	Overheard	竊聽風雲	Johnny Leung	alternative title: Wiretap
2009	Written By	再生號	Tony Tong	
2009	Poker King	撲克王	Uno	
2011	Life Without Principle	奪命金	Panther	alternative title: Death of a Hostage
2011	Overheard 2	竊聽風雲2	Manson Lo Man-sang	
2012	The Fairy Tale Killer	追凶 / 完美童話 / 索命童話	Inspector Wong Wai-han	alternative title: Perfect Fairy Tale
2012	The Great Magician	大魔術師	General Lei	
2012	The Bullet Vanishes	消失的子彈	Inspector Song Donglu	alternative title: Ghost Bullets / Disappeared Bullets / Lost Bullets
2013	Out of Inferno	逃出生天 / 逃出生天3D	Mak Tai-kwan	alternative title: Inferno 3D
2013	The White Storm	掃毒 / 變役	Ma Ho-tin	alternative title: Metamorphosis / The Cartel War
2014	Overheard 3	竊聽風雲3	Luk Kam-keung	
2015	Insanity	暴瘋語	Fan Kwok-sang	
2015	Tale of Three Cities	三城記	Fang Daolong	
2015	The Vanished Murderer	消失的兇手	Song Donglu	alternative title: The Bullet Vanishes 2 / The Murderer Vanishes
2016	Call of Heroes	危城 / 危城殲霸	Yang Kenan	alternative title: The Deadly Reclaim
2016	Heartfall Arises	驚心破 / 驚天破	Calvin Che	
2017	Dealer/Healer	毒。誡	Chan Wah	
2019	My Pet is an Elephant	我的寵物是大象	Qi Wei	Post-production
2019	Integrity	廉政風雲 煙幕	Chan King-Chi	
2020	Shock Wave 2	拆彈專家2	Tung Cheuk-man	
2022	Detective vs Sleuths	神探大戰	Lee Jun	
2022	Warriors of Future	明日戰記	Johnson Cheng	
2023	The White Storm 3: Heaven or Hell	掃毒3	Hong So-chai	
2024	Crisis Negotiators	談判專家	Cheuk Man Wai	
2024	Papa	爸爸	Nin Yuen	
2025	Sons of the Neon Night	風林火山	Police officer	

=== Television series ===
Year	English title	Original title	Role	Network	Notes
1983	Woman on the Beat	警花出更		TVB Jade	Bit part
1983	Hong Kong '83	香港八三		TVB Jade	Bit part
1983	The Man in the Middle	夾心人		TVB Jade	Alternative title: Sandwiches; Bit part
1984	The Fearless Duo	天師執位		TVB Jade	Bit part
1984	The New Adventures of Chor Lau Heung	楚留香之蝙蝠傳奇		TVB Jade	Bit part
1984	Rainbow Round My Shoulder	畫出彩虹	Law Ka-kan	TVB Jade	
1984	Police Cadet '84	新紮師兄	Ngai-fung / Fit Lo	TVB Jade	
1984	Qiu Jin: A Woman to Remember	秋瑾	Yeung Hok-ling	TVB Jade	
1984	It's a Long Way Home	家有嬌妻	Dang Hin-coeng	TVB Jade	
1984	The Smiling, Proud Wanderer	笑傲江湖	Mai Wai-ji	TVB Jade	
1984	The Duke of Mount Deer	鹿鼎記	Wan Yau-fong	TVB Jade	
1985	Take Care, Your Highness!	皇上保重	Chiu Nam-sing	TVB Jade	
1985	The Fallen Family	武林世家		TVB Jade	
1985	The Pit Fall	種計		TVB Jade	
1985	Police Cadet '85	新紮師兄續集	Ngai-fung / Fit Lo	TVB Jade	
1985	The Battle Among the Clans	大香港	Lam Cho	TVB Jade	
1986	Movie Maze	銀色旅途		TVB Jade	
1986	Destined to Rebel	薛剛反唐		TVB Jade	
1986	The Superlative Affections	赤腳紳士		TVB Jade	
1987	Genghis Khan	成吉思汗	Chilaun	TVB Jade	
1987	When Silken Hands Get Rough	靜待黎明		TVB Jade	
1987	The Grand Canal	大運河		TVB Jade	
1987	Born to Be a King	大明群英		TVB Jade	
1987	The Dragon Sword	天龍神劍		TVB Jade	
1987	The Runaway	血網迷情		TVB Jade	
1988	Twilight of a Nation	太平天國	Siu Chiu-kwai	TVB Jade	
1988	The Story of Two Women	藍色時份		TVB Jade	
1988	And Yet We Live	當代男兒		TVB Jade	
1989	The Shanghai Conspiracy	上海大風暴		TVB Jade	
1989	The Fatal Game	遊戲邊緣	Mike	TVB Jade	
1989	My Son-In-Law	婆媽女婿		TVB Jade	
1990	It Runs in the Family	孖仔孖心肝		TVB Jade	
1990	A Time of Taste	燃燒歲月		TVB Jade	
1990	A World Apart	水鄉危情		TVB Jade	
1990	The Challenge of Life	人在邊緣		TVB Jade	
1991	Heartbreak Blues	與郎共舞		TVB Jade	
1991	Generation Empress	一代皇后大玉兒		Asia Television	
1992	The Greed of Man	大時代	Fong Chin-bok	TVB Jade	
2000	Divine Retribution	世紀之戰	Fong San-hap	Asia Television	

=== Dubbing ===
Lau has also done voiceover work for films:

Year	English title	Original title	Role	Notes
1994	Over the Rainbow, Under the Skirt	記得香蕉成熟時II初戀情人	Narrator	alternative title: Yesterday You, Yesterday Me II
1997	Yesterday You, Yesterday Me	記得…香蕉成熟時3為妳鍾情	Yeung Shing-bo at 32	Voice
1999	Toy Story 2	—N/a	Buzz Lightyear	Hong Kong version
2002	Black Mask 2: City of Masks	黑俠 II	Wolf	alternative title: Black Mask II; Cantonese voice
2003	Finding Nemo	—N/a	Marlin	Hong Kong version
2004	Garfield: The Movie	—N/a	Garfield	Hong Kong version
2006	Garfield: A Tail of Two Kitties	—N/a	Garfield	Hong Kong version
2007	The Secret of the Magic Gourd	寶葫蘆的秘密 / 魔法小葫蘆	Magic Gourd	alternative title: The Magic Gourd
2009	Garfield's Pet Force	—N/a	Garfield	Hong Kong version
2010	Toy Story 3	—N/a	Buzz Lightyear	Hong Kong version
2011	The Lost Bladesman	關雲長	Cao Cao	Hong Kong version
2016	Finding Dory	—N/a	Marlin	Hong Kong version
2017	The Lego Batman Movie	—N/a	Bruce Wayne / Batman	Hong Kong version
2019	Toy Story 4	—N/a	Buzz Lightyear	Hong Kong version

=== Host ===
Year	Event	Notes
2016	35th Hong Kong Film Awards	Master of ceremonies

== Awards and nominations ==
Lau has won Best Actor Awards at the Hong Kong Film Critics Society Awards in 1997, 2001, 2011, 2014 and the Golden Bauhinia Awards in 1999 and 2007. He also won his first Best Actor award at the Hong Kong Film Awards in 2007 for his performance in the film My Name Is Fame. He won his first Golden Horse Award in 2012 for his performance in Life Without Principle.

Year	Award	Category	Nominated work	Result
1994	14th Hong Kong Film Awards	Best Actor	Thou Shalt Not Swear	Nominated
1994	14th Hong Kong Film Awards	Best Actor	C'est la vie, mon chéri	Nominated
1996	16th Hong Kong Film Awards	Best Actor	Big Bullet	Nominated
1997	17th Hong Kong Film Awards	Best Actor	Full Alert	Nominated
1997	Hong Kong Film Critics Society Awards	Best Actor	Full Alert	Won
1998	18th Hong Kong Film Awards	Best Actor	The Longest Nite	Nominated
1999	19th Hong Kong Film Awards	Best Actor	The Victim	Nominated
1999	36th Golden Horse Awards	Best Leading Actor	The Victim	Nominated
1999	Golden Bauhinia Awards	Best Actor	The Victim	Nominated
1999	Golden Bauhinia Awards	Best Actor	Where a Good Man Goes	Won
2001	Hong Kong Film Critics Society Awards	Best Actor	La Brassiere	Won
2003	23rd Hong Kong Film Awards	Best Actor	Lost in Time	Nominated
2006	26th Hong Kong Film Awards	Best Actor	My Name Is Fame	Won
2006	Golden Bauhinia Awards	Best Actor	My Name Is Fame	Won
2007	27th Hong Kong Film Awards	Best Actor	Mad Detective	Nominated
2009	29th Hong Kong Film Awards	Best Actor	Overheard	Nominated
2011	31st Hong Kong Film Awards	Best Actor	Life Without Principle	Nominated
2011	31st Hong Kong Film Awards	Best Actor	Overheard 2	Nominated
2012	49th Golden Horse Awards	Best Leading Actor	Life Without Principle	Won
2012	55th Asia Pacific Film Festival	Best Actor	Life Without Principle	Nominated
2014	51st Golden Horse Awards	Best Leading Actor	The White Storm	Nominated
2015	21st Hong Kong Film Critics Society Awards	Best Actor	Overheard 3	Won
2015	10th Hong Kong Film Directors' Guild Awards	Best Actor	Overheard 3	Won
2015	34th Hong Kong Film Awards	Best Actor	Overheard 3	Won
2015	34th Hong Kong Film Awards	Best Actor	Insanity	Nominated
2023	29th Hong Kong Film Critics Society Awards	Best Actor	Detective vs Sleuths	Nominated
2023	18th Hong Kong Film Directors' Guild Awards	Best Actor	Detective vs Sleuths	Won
2023	41st Hong Kong Film Awards	Best Actor	Detective vs Sleuths	Won
2025	31st Hong Kong Film Critics Society Awards	Best Actor	Papa	Won
2025	18th Asian Film Awards	Best Actor	Papa	Won
2025	43rd Hong Kong Film Awards	Best Actor	Papa	Won
2025	18th Asia Pacific Screen Awards	Best Performance	Papa	Won
