= Born Wild (film) =

2001 Hong Kong film by Patrick Leung

- Film poster
- Traditional Chinese: 野獸之瞳
- Simplified Chinese: 野兽之瞳
- Hanyu Pinyin: Yě Shòu Zhī Tóng
- Jyutping: Je2 Sau3 Zi1 Tung4
- Directed by: Patrick Leung
- Screenplay by: Chan Hing-ka; Amy Chin
- Produced by: Chan Hing-ka; Amy Chin
- Starring: Louis Koo; Daniel Wu; Patrick Tam; Jo Kuk
- Cinematography: Joe Chan; Fletcher Poon
- Edited by: Chan Kei-hop; Yau Chi-wai; Jeff Cheung
- Music by: Chiu Tsang-hei; Anthony Chue
- Production companies: China Star Entertainment Group; One Hundred Years of Film; Icon Film Company
- Distributed by: China Star Entertainment Group
- Release date: 31 May 2001
- Running time: 109 minutes
- Country: Hong Kong
- Language: Cantonese
- Box office: HK$1,294,585

Born Wild is a 2001 Hong Kong action drama film directed by Patrick Leung and starring Louis Koo, Daniel Wu, Patrick Tam and Jo Kuk.

== Plot ==
Tan (Louis Koo) and Tide Ho (Daniel Wu) are estranged twin brothers who have fought ever since they were born. Tan was a bright child who was active and outgoing while Tide is the complete opposite, whom was shy and introverted. But in reality, Tide was actually just as bright as Tan but kept it to himself. On his twenty-sixth birthday, Tide receives the news of his brother's death. He then proceeds to investigate Tan's mysterious death. In Tan's house, Tide meets his brother's lover Sandy (Jo Kuk) and best friend Mann (Patrick Tam). Tide eventually discovers that his brother was framed in a boxing fight and was killed during a fight. At the same time, Tide finds himself attracted to Sandy's warmth and fixes himself as the opponent of Tan's murderer and avenge his brother's death.

== Cast ==
- Louis Koo as Tan Ho / Jonas
  - Yeung Chin-fung as Teenage Tan
  - Chang Ka-cheun as Child Tan
- Daniel Wu as Tide Ho
  - Yeung Yat-fung as Teenage Tide
  - Man Ching-fung as Child Tide
- Patrick Tam as Mann
- Jo Kuk as Sandy
- Felix Lok as Chu
- Arthur Wong as Lao Wu
- Chang Kuo-chu as Ho Chuen
- Phyllis Quek as Tan's mom in her teens
- Wrath White as Arion
- Pai Ying as Mr. Ying
- Park Ju-chun as Mr Ying's Korean Boxer
- Ron Smoorenburg as Mr Ying's 6 ft 5 White Boxer
- Lawrence Cheng as Sandy's eye doctor
- Cheung Shui-chit as Marco
- Chan Sang as gambler who always bets on Tan
- Maria Chan as Tide's girlfriend
- Wong Wai-fai as underground boxer # 1
- Dave Lam as underground boxer # 2
- Jay Lau as underground boxer # 3
- Guo Jian-yong as underground boxer # 4
- Roderick Lam as underground boxer # 5
- Man Yeung as Wah
- Chris Chan as Tan's daughter
- Sze-to Yuk-ying as Policeman
- Man Yip as Policeman
- Bat Chin-lung as Thai boxer
- Siu Mou-yan as Marco's receptionist
- Tan Kon-chung as Chu's thug
- So Wai-nam as Chu's thug
- Ho Wai-yip as Chu's thug
- Philip Ng as Chu's thug

== Award nomination ==
- 21st Hong Kong Film Awards
  - Nominated: Best Supporting Actor (Patrick Tam)

== Reception ==
=== Critical ===
John Charles, associate editor and film reviewer for Video Watchdog magazine, gave the film four stars out of ten on the website Hong Kong Digital and a negative review citing its tediously overstylized combat sequences, hanging plot threads, and its ludicrous climax.

Love HK Film gave a mixed review writing it as "Well made with some fine performances (Patrick Tam and Jo Kuk), the film also suffers from mind-numbing existentialism and an emotionally-bereft payoff. Smaller parts of Born Wild make it worth seeing, but the whole is questionably above average."

=== Box office ===
The film grossed HK$1,294,585 at the Hong Kong box office during its run from 31 May to 27 June 2001 in Hong Kong.
