= The Time You Need a Friend =

1984 Hong Kong-Taiwanese film by John Woo

- Traditional Chinese: 笑匠
- Hanyu Pinyin: Xiao jiang
- Directed by: John Woo
- Written by: John Woo
- Produced by: Raymond Chow
- Starring: Sun Yueh; Tao Da-wei; Liu Shui-chi
- Cinematography: Cheung Yiu-Cho; Jimmy Yu Chun
- Edited by: Peter Cheung
- Music by: Frankie Chan
- Production company: Cinema City Company Limited
- Release date: 10 January 1985 (Hong Kong)
- Running time: 106 minutes
- Countries: Hong Kong; Taiwan
- Language: Cantonese
- Box office: HK$859,456

The Time You Need a Friend (Chinese: 笑匠; pinyin: Xiao jiang) is a 1985 Cantonese-language comedy-drama film directed by John Woo. The film is co-produced by Hong Kong and Taiwan.

== Plot ==
Ku Ren and Shen Bien are two vaudeville comedians who worked together successfully from 1941 to 1963 but then broke up over a woman. When Ku Ren is scheduled to appear on a benefit show, the show's organizers also attempt to hire Shen Bien for a reunion of the popular duo. Miss Yia Nan, who works for the show, faces difficulties as the two comedians are resistant to working together on the show due to their past problems. The two agree to perform, but Shen Bien dies on stage at the end of their performance.

== Cast ==
- Sun Yueh as Mr. Ku Ren
- Tao Da-wei as Shen Bien
- Liu Shui-Chi as Miss Yia Nan
- Chiang Hsia as Miss Liang
- Liu Meng-Yan as Nancy Huang
- Wu Hsiao-Kang as Peter
- Kau Yuk-Kei
- Hsu Kang-Tai
- Lam Lap-Wan
- Kuan Kuan as Doctor
- Hsiao Hou-Tou as Patient
- Chu Feng-Kang
- Tin Hei-Yan

== Production ==
The plot was inspired by Neil Simon's play The Sunshine Boys.

The film was shot in Taiwan.

Jeremy Carr of Senses of Cinema wrote that around this time "Woo felt he and his potential were languishing. He had begun working for Cinema City in the early 1980s and was tasked with menial studio duties or was beholden to the formulaic requirements of lacklustre films like the disappointing The Time You Need a Friend (1984) and Run Tiger Run (1984), two features shot in Taiwan."

In an interview with Robert K. Elder contained in the book John Woo: The Interviews, Woo recalled, "At that time, the reason I wanted to leave Golden Harvest and move to Cinema City was, they promised me, if I moved to their company, they would let me shoot what I really wanted to shoot. [...] But they didn't keep their promise. [...] They just wanted me to continue making comedies. I was pretty upset, but I had to survive. I had to make a living. All I could do was make another comedy for them."

== Release ==
The film was released theatrically in Hong Kong from 10 to 16 January 1985, earning HK$859,456.

== Reception ==
Reviewer Kenneth Brorsson of sogoodreviews.com wrote, "The Time You Need A Friend gives us a mix of Woo's comedy roots but with a touch of warmth and character that would make its into his action work subsequently. [...] The film certainly largely is a loud comedy with drama inserted at appropriate moments and initiated viewers of Hong Kong cinema will know that these can very much be contrasting moods and frankly not workable because of it. [...] Woo from the opening frame showcases his love for silent comedy and he celebrates great triumphs with actors Suen Yet and David Tao during several of their "bouts" as he plays out all manner of happenings with timing akin to any of the great silent comedy classics. It's not only endearing in execution and genuinely an insane part of the characters but it's more funny than any comedy I've seen Woo direct. [...] So despite going on a lot of assumptions here regarding the originality and validity of John Woo's work on The Time You Need A Friend, you can't possibly neglect what he brings, which is a genuinely funny, endearing and suitably low-key heartfelt story about two grumpy old men coming to terms with their own past and facing the immediate future with a humanistic outlook. Despite praise above, the film is never outstanding or a masterpiece but then again, it's hard to find any flaws, especially with the terrific and hilarious double act in actors Sun Yuet and David Tao at hand."

In the book John Woo: The Films, author Kenneth E. Hall wrote of Woo that The Time You Need a Friend was one of "two films of which he is rather ashamed."

The review on serp.media reads, "The Time You Need a Friend, also known as Xiao jiang, is a heartwarming drama set in 1985. Two vaudeville comedians, who had previously split apart due to a woman, are unexpectedly reunited for a benefit show. The show aims to raise money for the sick children, bringing the comedians' lives back into each other's orbit."

The website onderhond.com gave the film a rating of 3 out of 5.

In an interview with Robert K. Elder contained in the book John Woo: The Interviews, director John Woo recalled, "the movie didn't work, because maybe people weren't ready for that kind of story. People didn't buy it."
