= Somebody Up There Likes Me (1996 film) =

1996 Hong Kong film by Patrick Leung

- DVD cover
- Traditional Chinese: 浪漫風暴
- Simplified Chinese: 浪漫风暴
- Hanyu Pinyin: Làng Màn Fēng Bào
- Jyutping: Long6 Maan6 Fung1 Bou6
- Directed by: Patrick Leung
- Screenplay by: Chan Hing-ka
- Produced by: John Woo
- Starring: Aaron Kwok; Carmen Lee; Sammo Hung
- Cinematography: Arthur Wong; Cheung Man-po
- Edited by: David Wu
- Music by: Dennie Wong
- Production companies: Long Shong Pictures; Milestone Films
- Distributed by: Newport Entertainment
- Release date: 12 January 1996
- Running time: 114 minutes
- Country: Hong Kong
- Language: Cantonese
- Box office: HK$11,611,563

Somebody Up There Likes Me (Chinese: 浪漫風暴) is a 1996 Hong Kong action romance film directed by Patrick Leung and starring Aaron Kwok, Carmen Lee and a special appearance by Sammo Hung.

== Plot ==
With encouragement from his girlfriend, Gloria (Carmen Lee), Ken Wong (Aaron Kwok), a rebellious and stubborn youth, decides to focus on kickboxing. During a match, Ken accidentally kills Gloria's older brother, Rocky (Michael Tong), and the two break up. Ken is unwilling to give up his kickboxing career and seeks tuition from kickboxing master, Black Jack Hung (Sammo Hung). He also manages to reconcile with Gloria, who supports Ken returning to the ring to complete her brother's wish to challenge Yamada Motokazu (Sawada Kenya), the kickboxing champion of Asia. Due to constantly suffering blows to his head, Ken's is physically traumatized and once able to defeat Yamada, he also collapses.

== Cast ==
- Aaron Kwok as Ken Wong
- Carmen Lee as Gloria Chan
- Sammo Hung as Black Jack Hung (special appearance)
- Michael Tong as Rocky Chan
- Hilary Tsui as Pam
- May Law as Ken's mother
- Sawada Kenya as Yamamda Moyokazu
- Jun Kunimura as Yamada's manager
- Vincent Kok as Loud Boxing Spectator
- Clifton Ko as Pau
- Ann Hui as Teacher
- Lawrence Ah Mon as Doctor
- Bonnie Wong as Gloria and Rocky's mother
- Perry Chiu as Ken's sister
- Chan Tak-hing as Big B / Den
- Ken Lok as Pang
- Fruit Chan as Policeman
- Alan Mak as Policeman
- Benny Lam as Po
- Lee Man-piu as Ken's Former Master
- Winston Yeh as Keith Wong (Ken's father)
- Chang Yuk-chuen as Chuen

== Box office ==
The film grossed HK$11,611,563 at the Hong Kong box office during its theatrical run from 12 January to 14 February 1996 in Hong Kong.

== Accolades ==
Accolades
| Ceremony | Category | Recipient | Outcome |
|---|---|---|---|
| 16th Hong Kong Film Awards | Best Cinematography | Arthur Wong | Nominated |
| 16th Hong Kong Film Awards | Best Film Editing | David Wu | Nominated |

== See also ==
- List of films about boxing
- Somebody Up There Likes Me (1956 film)
