= Bomb Disposal Officer: Baby Bomb =

1994 Hong Kong film by Jamie Luk

- Film poster
- Traditional Chinese: 拆彈專家寶貝炸彈
- Simplified Chinese: 拆弹专家宝贝炸弹
- Hanyu Pinyin: Chāi Dàn Zhuān Jiā Bǎo Bèi Zhà Dàn
- Jyutping: Caak3 Daan2 Zyun1 Gaa1 Bou2 Bui3 Za3 Daan2
- Directed by: Jamie Luk
- Screenplay by: Tony Leung; Law Kam-fai
- Produced by: Tony Leung
- Starring: Anthony Wong; Lau Ching-wan; Esther Kwan
- Cinematography: Jimmy Wong
- Edited by: Wong Wing-ming; Mui Tung-lit
- Music by: Healthy Poon; Cacine Wong
- Production companies: Galaxy Films; Universe Film Production
- Distributed by: Newport Entertainment
- Release date: 3 September 1994
- Running time: 94 minutes
- Country: Hong Kong
- Language: Cantonese
- Box office: HK$3,488,953

Bomb Disposal Officer: Baby Bomb is a 1994 Hong Kong buddy cop comedy thriller film directed by Jamie Luk and starring Anthony Wong and Lau Ching-wan as bomb disposal officers of the Royal Hong Kong Police Force and roommates who accidentally impregnate a young woman (Esther Kwan) and not knowing who the father is, all while a psychopathic bomber is on the loose setting off bombs around the city.

== Plot ==
On Easter, a bomb goes off in a department store while a cheating married woman and her lover were strapped with bombs inside an abandoned godown in East Kowloon and bomb disposal officers John Wu and Peter Chan, who are best friends and roommates, were called to scene where they successfully disposal the explosives. At night, John and Peter drink at a bar where the former loses in a game of Jenga against another patron and afterwards, encounter a young woman, Mary, being dumped and thrown out by her boyfriend. John and Peter let her stay in their place for one night while unsuccessfully trying to make advances towards her and eventually rents her their storage room. The next day at the briefing at the police station, Peter reports the bombs found in recent bombing cases were made using the same model brand while he and John deduce the mad bomber is a dangerous suspect who is not actually very knowledgeable in making explosives and is psychologically very self-abased and makes bombs to attract attention. Peter and John I were assigned to write a report about the suspected mad bomber recent bombing case to the Regional Crime Unit who will set up a special team to handle the case. Mary, while working at her job passing out flyers at the Galaxy Restaurant, gets her wallet stolen by a thief and meets a group of Christians who she befriends and brings them to John and Peter's house at night and forcing the two to join in their Christian activities including praying for an injured fellow all night in the hospital.

John and Peter arrive to work the next day despite being sleep deprived, were called to a restaurant in Tsim Sha Tsui where again successfully dispose another bomb, which was reported in the news and was notices by the culprit, who is a school staff. That night, Mary planned on treating John and Peter dinner at the Galaxy Restaurant as it was her payday, but was fired by her boss who accused her of stealing and the two get back at her boss by trashing the restaurant before going to a bar where John, Peter and Mary win a bet against another patron is game of squeezing orange juice and then get drunk and end up sleeping on the same bed at home. Peter and John are worried about getting Mary pregnant, while Mary decides to return to Canada to avoid the two men falling for her at the same time.

After a while, the chief of the Regional Crime Unit decides to disband the special time as the mad bomber has not committed a crime for the time being despite objections from Peter and John, and right after, the chief opens a mail which explodes and seriously injures him. At this time, Mary returns from Canada and announces she is pregnant but John and Peter are reluctant to father her child, so Mary moves in with their neighbor, Ken, but eventually persuades her to move back with them after a change of heart with the influence of a colleague who is a father to a newborn. Meanwhile, the mad bomber leaves a bomb in sla minibus which startles everyone, causing the bus to flip. Everyone is able to escape except a mother and her infant child and John and Peter were called to the scene where they were able to rescue the baby but not the mother before the bomb went off. John then curses the mad bomber directly at a reporter's camera which enrages the bomber who was watching the news.

Peter and John bring Mary to check her baby at the hospital before arriving to work and seeing their department office blown up by the bomber who encased the bomb in a mail. The two then rushes to stop Mary from opening a mail in their home but luckily, there was no bomb and it was just a letter from her mother. However, Mary suddenly was about to give birth and the two send her to the hospital where she was captured by the bomber disguised as a nurse to the X-ray room and attached her to a bomb in which the trigger is connected to her labor pains. Peter and John chase down the bomber, who takes a nurse hostage with an injection shot before John grabs hold of him and the bomber is killed by the shot. Peter then works on disposing the bomb while John helps Mary deliver her baby. After Mary successfully gives birth to her baby boy, Peter detaches her from the bomb and John takes her place using him pulse to keep the bomb steady and successfully disposes the bomb by cutting the red wire.

== Cast ==
- Anthony Wong as John Wu
- Lau Ching-wan as Peter Chan
- Esther Kwan as May Kwan
- Alexander Chan as Mad bomber
- Joe Cheung as Police chief
- Stephen Chang as Gambler
- Parkman Wong as Proud father policeman
- Lung Tin-sang as Ken
- Jamie Luk as Officer Chow
- King Kong Lam as Policeman
- Wong Chi-keung
- Lee Wai-si as Policeman
- Lee To-yue
- Foo Jing-wai
- Nelson Ngai
- Jimmy Wong as Ng San-kwai
- Ho Lin as Police chief's wife
- Chang Kin-yung as Policeman

== Reception ==
=== Critical reception ===
JJ Bona of City on Fire gave the film a score of 7/10 and praises Anthony Wong and Lau Ching-wan's abilities of being aloof and goofy whenever required. Chen of Love HK Film gives credit to the film's creative describes it as an "amusing time-waster".

=== Box office ===
The film grossed HK$3,488,953 at the Hong Kong box office during its theatrical run from 3 to 14 October 1994.
