= Cheuk Wan-chi =

Hong Kong actor and broadcaster

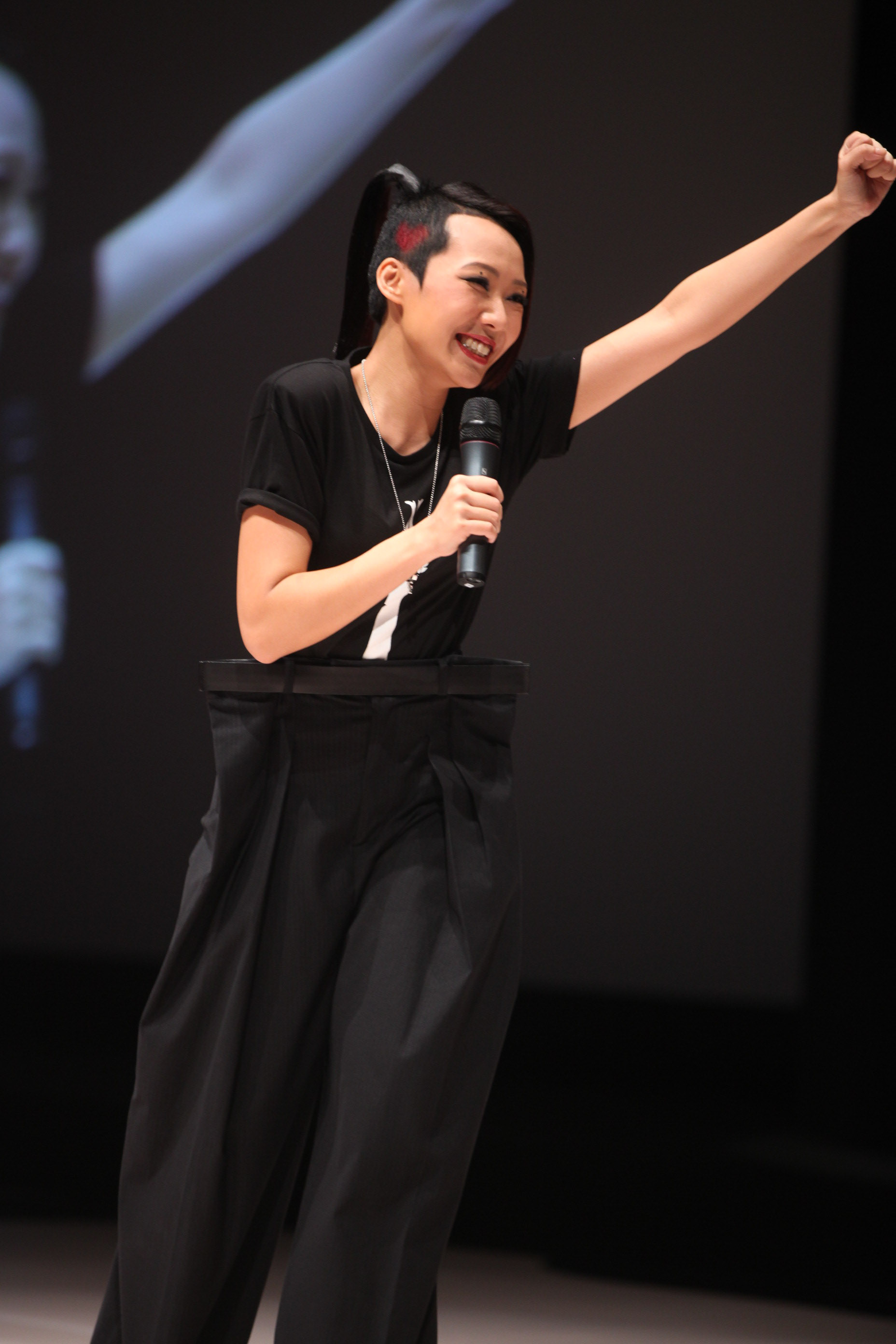
- Cheuk at One Night Stand
- Born: 28 March 1979 (age 47); Hong Kong
- Occupations: DJ; actress; artist; writer; movie director

Chinese name
Transcriptions
Standard Mandarin
- Hanyu Pinyin: Zhuó Yùnzhī
Yue: Cantonese
- Jyutping: Coek3 Wan5 Zi1
- Musical career
- Also known as: GC Goo-Bi, Vincci, G
- Origin: Hong Kong

Cheuk Wan-chi (Chinese: 卓韻芝; born 28 March 1979), also known as Vincci, G and GC Goo-Bi, is a Hong Kong media personality, stand-up comedian, screenwriter and director, and master of ceremonies. She first came to prominence as a disk jockey and radio personality working for Hong Kong's Commercial Radio (CRHK).

== Early life ==
Cheuk Wan-chi, popularly known as G, is a creative and media personality from Hong Kong. In 2008, Cheuk enrolled at Goldsmiths, University of London to study Fine Art but left without receiving her degree. Working in a variety of mediums, her work is well received in Hong Kong.

== Career ==
Cheuk started her career at Commercial Radio Hong Kong (CRHK) when she was 13 years old, as the youngest ever radio DJ in Hong Kong history. While still a 14-year-old and Secondary 4 student at St. Francis' Canossian College, Cheuk worked as a part-time DJ at Commercial Radio; her first show being a collaboration with Softhard. After graduating from Secondary 5, she became a full-time DJ at Commercial Radio's FM 90.3. Aged 17, she presented Gee See Goo Bi – I am Underaged; this programme was aired during off-peak hours and, for its time slot, attracted an unprecedented audience. Cheuk also created the radio serial, Gee See Goo Bi Family, of which the characters "Fu-Wing" and "Little Fu Sister" became break-out characters. It remains unknown as to who voiced "Fu-Wing" and "Little Fu Sister" in the Gee See Goo Bi Family, with some claims that Cheuk voiced all five characters (in addition to "Fu-Wing" and "Little Fu Sister", the characters "Miss Jing", "Neither-Male-Nor-Female", and the "Man with the Hoarse Voice"). Cheuk has never publicly clarified this. Cheuk later created other programmes, including Merry-Go-Round, Five-Star Family, Big Villager and 36 Strategems. In addition to being a long-serving prime time radio presenter, Cheuk also became a columnist for various newspapers and magazines; anthologies from these publications make her one of Hong Kong's best-selling authors, with a top-3 best-seller benchmark. Cheuk has also released prose books and comic books.

In 2007, Cheuk directed two short films called Lost & Found and Homo Sapiens. In the same year, she released two prose books called Enemy of Kong Qiu and Dodgy.

On 19 April 2008, which was incidentally the day of Famine 30, Cheuk released a book of her selected prose, What is Apple in Chinese?. She later held a book-reading club function at Miramar Hotel on 25 April 2008.

Cheuk finished her contemporary art project Born to Be A Witness, and a solo exhibition was held in Madhouse Contemporary in 2009.

In 2011, she held the first stand-up comedy solo show such as Anti-Indian racism and economic jokes by a female comedian in Hong Kong. Her stand-up special You Look Single and Come Rain or Come Shine were released through the streaming service Netflix.

In the field of celebrity endorsement, she often collaborates with internationally acclaimed brands; her public persona being one associated with creativity, social networking, and fashion.

==== Fu-Wing and Little Fu Sister in other media ====
In February 2008, Cheuk collaborated with Taiwan-based FunTown and South Korean developer RHAON to launch the online game RUNonline, known as HiYo Run Towards the Sky in Taiwan, it featured "Fu-Wing" and "Little Fu Sister".

The Gee See Goo Bi Family comic was created by Wu-Shang-Hao.

Cheuk has written a column in the persona of and using the pen name Fu-Wing, titled Fu-Wing's Writings: the column featured in Hong Kong lifestyle magazine Milk.

Cheuk is often credited as "GC Goo-Bi", a transliteration of "芝See菇Bi" (Gee See Goo Bi).

==== Resignation from CRHK ====
On 19 June 2008, Cheuk announced that she would leave CRHK two weeks later, that it would only be for a short break and that she would continue her art projects. She said she probably would return to school, but that she was still undecided about her specific direction.

On 30 June 2008, during the Radio Television Hong Kong (RTHK) programme Gimme 5, radio hosts Leung Tak-Fai and Wong Tin-Yee spoke emotionally of Cheuk's departure.

On 4 July 2008, Cheuk hosted the last episode of Torture University. The following day, before her official departure from the CRHK, she hosted the final episode of "Alabama".

On 3 July 2009, Cheuk announced, on the programme Talk of the town, that she would be heading to London to study an art-related course.

On 5 July 2009, Cheuk flew to London, where she took up an art course at Goldsmiths College, University of London; at the time it was believed that Chi would be emigrating to the United Kingdom. However, in September 2010, Cheuk returned to, and announced that she would be settling in, Hong Kong.

=== Charity ===
In February 2008, Cheuk was selected to be a World Vision Famine Star and, together with Sammi Cheng and Gigi Leung, participated in a charity trip to Laos.

=== Film and video work ===
Cheuk's screenplays have garnered several award nominations from both Hong Kong and overseas organisations. As a director, Cheuk's work has included a diverse range of music videos, commercials, internet shorts and 35mm feature films. As a producer, she produced the 20-episode series 20/30 Dictionary, which had fashion photographer Wing Shya as director.

As a screenwriter, two of the films she contributed to, 20 30 40 and Cross Harbour Tunnel, were official selections in the Berlin International Film Festival. Her screenplay for Merry-Go-Round won her the Hong Kong Film Critics Society (HKFCS) Award for Best Screenplay in 2002, and was also nominated in the screenplay category in the Golden Horse Awards.

Cheuk has participated in many movie and video production projects. Together with the cyberWorks-owned Now.com.hk of PCCW, Chi has also written and produced an Internet drama series, 20 30 Dictionary.

In 2011, Cheuk participated in the acting and directing of the short film, Love More; a short video project, Love More gained over one million hits with solely offline promotion.

In 2013, Cheuk released her debut feature film as a director with the action comedy Kick Ass Girls, which was financed by Lion Rock Pictures. Starring Chrissie Chau, Dada Lo and Hidy Yu, Cheuk was also part of the script-writing team and had an acting role in the film as a goth personal assistant.

In 2014, Cheuk released her second feature film Temporary Family, which was financed by Edko Film, starring Nick Cheung, Sammi Cheng and Angelababy. It has grossed HK$16,535,069 in Hong Kong and ¥100,436,001 in China.

== Awards and nominations ==
=== Movie awards ===
- Heroes in Love (2001)
  - Stockholm International Film Festival Bronze horse: Best film (Competition)
- Merry-Go-Round (2002)
  - HKFCS Award Best Screenplay (Won),
  - Golden Horse Awards Best Adopted Screen Screenplay (Nominated)
  - Hong Kong Film Awards Best Screen Screenplay (Nominated)
- Exodus (2007)
  - Golden Bauhinia Best Screenplay (Nominated)
- Wrong Dial (2011)
  - IFVA Open Category Silver Awards (Won).

=== Book awards ===
- What's apple in English?: HKPTU Best Ten Books 2009
- Your Heart is not a Public Toilet: HKPTU Best Ten Books 2011
- Granny's Quotes: HKPTU Best Ten Books 2013
- The Necessity of Travel: Hong Kong Golden Book Awards 2016
- The Necessity of Travel: The 29th Hong Kong Print Awards 2017

== Bibliography ==
| Year | Title | Genre | Press | ISBN |
|---|---|---|---|---|
| July 2000 | Live As A Whole Package (生活全套) | Prose | SCMP | 962-17-8169-8 |
| July 2001 | Well Well (生活好好過) | Prose | SCMP | 962-17-8358-5 |
| Dec 2001 | Infinite Future (勁有前途, Fu Wing series) | Comic | Commercial Radio Productions (CMP) | 962-8473-24-7 |
| Dec 2001 | Rarely Flushed (難得面紅) | Prose | CMP | 962-8473-23-9 |
| June 2002 | Lovable, Still (還可愛) | Biography | CMP | 962-8473-27-1 |
| July 2003 | The Missionary Position (男上女下) (Co-author: Jan Lamb) | Transcript | CMP | 962-8473-50-6 |
| July 2007 | Enemy of Kong Qiu (孔子的敵人) | Prose | Ming Pao | 978-962-8959-32-7 |
| Dec 2007 | Dodgy (是有點狡猾) | Prose | Ming Pao | 978-962-8959-63-1 |
| May 2008 | What's Apple in English? (蘋果的中文是甚麼？) (Book Prize: HKPTU Best 10 Books Election 2009) | Prose | Ming Pao | 978-962-8993-11-6 |
| Aug 2008 | War of Low Cut Dresses (低胸裙戰爭) | Prose | Ming Pao | 978-962-8993-56-7 |
| Dec 2008 | Exposed (走光再走光) | Prose | Ming Pao | 978-962-8994-03-8 |
| July 2009 | Push (推推推推推推推) | Prose | Ming Pao | 978-988-8026-75-3 |
| Feb 2010 | I can't live (if living is without YOU?!?) (愛是永恆(當所愛是你?!?)) | Prose | Ming Pao | 978-988-8027-36-1 |
| July 2010 | Your Heart Is Not Public Toilet (你的心不是公廁) | Prose | Ming Pao | 978-988-8027-73-6 |
| Oct 2010 | Adventures of Cheuk Wan Chi Journey in London: Coldest winter (卓韻芝奇遇記 — 最冷的冬天) | Travel literature | Ming Pao | 978-988-8081-69-1 |
| Dec 2010 | Adventures of Cheuk Wan Chi Journey in London: Hottest summer (卓韻芝奇遇記 — 最熱的夏天) | Travel literature | Ming Pao | 978-988-8081-75-2 |
| April 2011 | Who has next who did not? (誰有下次 誰沒有下次?) | Prose | Ming Pao | 978-988-8082-16-2 |
| July 2011 | Adventures of Cheuk Wan Chi Journey in Europe: In Betweenness (卓韻芝奇遇記 ─ 忽冷忽熱) | Travel literature | Ming Pao | 978-988-8082-61-2 |
| July 2011 | Adventures of Cheuk Wan Chi: 'Coldest winter', 'Hottest summer' & 'In Betweenness', with small booklet 'g'. | Travel literature | Ming Pao | 978-988-8134-03-8 |
| Feb 2012 | Life as couples (活得像戀人) | Prose | Ming Pao | 978-988-8134-66-3 |
| July 2012 | Today Gramma's Epigram (今日阿婆金句) | Prose | Ming Pao | 978-988-8135-37-0 |
| Feb 2013 | Admit Your Love (承認你的愛) | Prose | Ming Pao | 978-988-8206-27-8 |
| July 2013 | Commercial Smile (商業笑容) | Prose | Ming Pao | 978-988-8207-13-8 |
| July 2014 | Director's 13 Fables (導演的13個預言) | Prose | Ming Pao | 978-988-8287-64-2 |
| Dec 2014 | Today Gramma's Epigram 2 (今日阿婆金句 II) | Prose | Ming Pao | 978-988-8288-18-2 |
| July 2015 | N-Girl's guide (N-girl 養成術) | Self-guided | Ming Pao | 978-988-8337-00-2 |
| Nov 2015 | Overnight Ink (宿墨傷筆) | Prose | Ming Pao | 978-988-8337-45-3 |
| July 2016 | What We Talk About When We Talk About Love (當我們談論愛情時) | Prose | Ming Pao | 978-988-83-3829-0 |
| July 2016 | The Necessity of Travel (旅行之必要) | Travel literature | Joint Publishing | 978-962-04-3967-4 |
| July 2016 | Maybe This Road (峰迴路轉) | Travel literature | Joint Publishing | 978-962-04-4300-8 |

== Stage work ==
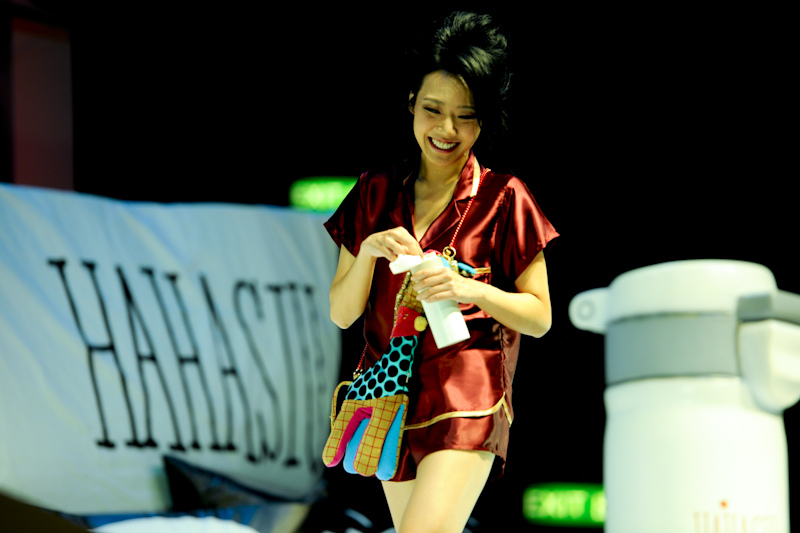
One Night Stand 2013

=== Stand-up comedy ===
- "One Night Stand", 13–17 July 2011. Venue: Hong Kong Academy for Performing Arts.
- "One Night Stand (Again)", 17–19 March 2012. Venue: Hong Kong Convention and Exhibition Centre.
- "I Dislike You" One Night Stand, 11–12 October 2012. Venue: Queen Elizabeth Stadium, Hong Kong.
- "I Dislike You" One Night Stand, Macau, 9 March 2013. Venue: Forum de Macau, Macau.
- "HAHASEX", 19–21 December 2013. Venue: Queen Elizabeth Stadium, Hong Kong.
- "Call For A Drink" One Night Stand, 32 shows between January and April 2015. Venue: various.
- "You Look Single" One Night Stand, 5–6 December 2015. Venue: Queen Elizabeth Stadium, Hong Kong. 28–29 March 2016. Venue: PMQ, Hong Kong.
- "Come Rain Or Come Shine" One Night Stand, 26–28 August 2016. Venue: Macpherson Stadium, Hong Kong.
- "Love and Lie" One Night Stand, 27–28 October 2018. Venue: Macpherson Stadium, Hong Kong.
- "Love and Lie (Honeymoon Aftermath)" One Night Stand, 10 January 2019. Venue: Queen Elizabeth Stadium, Hong Kong.

=== Plays ===
- "Unidentified Human Remains and the True Nature of Love", 21–26 April 2015. Venue: Kwai Tsing Theatre Auditorium, Hong Kong.
- "No News is True News", 27 November – 8 December 2020. Venue: Kwai Tsing Theatre Auditorium, Hong Kong.
- "Sound Of Silence", 24 August – 4 September 2021. Venue: Hong Kong Arts Centre Shouson Theatre, Hong Kong. (Cast, Playwright and Director)
- "Rent A Human", 25 November – 4 December 2022. Venue: Kwai Tsing Theatre Auditorium, Hong Kong. (Cast and Playwright)

== Filmography ==
=== Director ===
- Heroes in Love (feature film) (2001)
- After (featurette: Nike women)
- 花灑 (MV: Leo Koo) (2006)
- 招摇 (MV: Grace Ip) (2006)
- Lost & Found (featurette) (2007)
- Homo Sapiens (featurette) (2007)
- One Minute (featurette) (2011)
- Wrong Dial (featurette) (2011) IFVA Open Category Silver Awards
- Kick Ass Girls (feature film) (2013)
- Temporary Family (2014)
- Vital Sign (feature film) (2023）

=== Actress ===
- Perfect Crime (愛你愛到殺死你) (1997)
- Twelve Nights (十二夜) (2000)
- La Brassiere (絕世好Bra) (2001)
- Let's Sing Along (男歌女唱) (2001)
- Feel 100% (百分百感覺) (2002)
- If You Care (賤精先生) (2002)
- Mighty Baby (絕世好B) (2002)
- Heat Team (重案黐孖GUN) (2004)
- Protégé de la Rose Noire (見習黑玫瑰) (2004)
- Super Model (我要做Model) (2004)
- A Chinese Tall Story (情癲大聖) (2005)
- All's Well, Ends Well 2012 (八星抱喜) (2012)
- Kick Ass Girls (爆3俏嬌娃) (2013)
- The Midnight After (那夜凌晨，我坐上了旺角開往大埔的紅VAN) (2014)

=== Screenwriter ===
- Cross Harbour Tunnel (1999)
  - Official selected at Berlin International Film Festival,
  - Rotterdam International Film Festival,
  - Vancouver International Film festival,
  - Hong Kong International Film Festival.
- Heroes in Love (2001)
- Merry-Go-Round (2002)
  - Golden Horse Awards Best Adopted Screen Screenplay nominated,
  - HKFCS Award Best Screenplay,
  - Hong Kong Film Awards Best Screen Screenplay nominated.
- 20,30,40 (2004)
  - Berlin Golden Bear for Best Film Nomination.
- Exodus (Hong Kong Golden Bauhinia Best Screenplay nomination, 2007)
  - Official selected at Toronto International Film Festival,
  - Official selection at Pusan International Film Festival,
  - San Sebastian International Film Festival Competition,
  - Golden Bauhinia Best Screenplay nominated.
- Temporary Family (2014)
- Vital Sign (Hong Kong International Film Festival closing film, 2023)

=== Producer ===
- Web drama series 20/30 Dictionary for PCCW Now.com.hk (2004)
- 12-featurette campaign "Love More" funded by The Li Ka Shing Foundation. Directed and performed in "Wrong Dial" and "1 Minute" (2001)

== Other work ==
=== Radio programmes ===
- Open-minded Public Relation Practitioner (豁達公關) (1994)
- Softhard Morning Everyday (朝朝軟硬今朝) (1995)
- Girls do not worship (不崇拜的女孩) (1995–1996)
- Gee See Goo Bi–I Am Underaged (芝see菇bi我未成年) (1996–1997)
- Gee See Goo Bi–I Have A Head (芝see菇bi我有個頭) (1997–1998)
- Gee See Goo Bi Family (1998–2000)
- Gee See Goo Bi Family Day
- Herbal Tea (男上女下) (1999)
- Through life (過生活) (2000–2003)
- Torture University (五天精華遊) (2004–2008)
- Give me a call (給我電話) (2006)
- 903 HKCEE Here with you (903 傍住你放榜) (2006)
- 903 Top 20 (903專業推介) (2006)
- Alabama (2008)
- Talk of the town (一八七二遊花園) (3 July 2009)
- Talk of the town (一八七二遊花園) (3 Feb 2011)
- Talk of the town (一八七二遊花園) (6–17 Feb 2012)

=== Television ===
TVB

- The Green Hope (2000) Drama
- Charlene's Reality Show (2007)
- I Know Men (2012) Chat show
- Lipstick Circle (2012) Chat show

ViuTV

- Study With Chief Executive of Hong Kong 2047 (2016)
- Good Night Show - King Maker (2018) – Acting coach
- King Maker III (2020) – Judge (EP1-13)
- King Maker IV (2021) – Judge (EP21-27)

=== Voice artist ===
- In the 2008 online game "Run Online", Chi plays the role of KiKi.

=== Advertisements ===
- Converse 100th Anniversary (2009)
- Dermes (moult company) (2008)
- Converse (2011)

=== Art ===
On 31 May 2008, G announced on her blog that she was producing an art project called Born to Be a Witness. On 11 September 2008, she decided on the Chinese name for Born to Be a Witness, settling on characters translating to "Meet the big scene" for the Milk Magazine No. 373. The Born to Be a Witness exhibition went from 10 to 24 January 2009 in Central and was extended, continuing from 29 to 31 January.

==== Milk Magazine Record ====
Between 2008 and 2009, Cheuk contributed a series of art-related columns to Milk Magazine, documenting her project 'Born to Be a Witness' and exploring themes of urban aesthetics.

=== Newspaper columns ===
- From 1999 to 2002, Cheuk was a columnist at the Oriental Daily, Sun Daily, Sing Tao Daily and Sing Pao. Her columns have been compiled into book form as "Live As A Whole Package", "Well Well" and others.
- 6 December 2008 saw her last Apple Daily column, "Do not let me die at the weekend".
- 3 March 2009 saw a new column in Ming Pao, titled "Cheuk Wan-chi is now writing". Later that year, it was followed by two new columns "Romance and Prejudice" at New Monday Magazine, from 3 June, and "Cheuk Wan-chi Journey", for Ming Pao Weekly from 6 June.
- Cheuk's current column is "Big asking for too much" in Weekend Weekly.

== Controversies ==
=== Attempted suicide ===
On 18 October 2006, Cheuk attempted suicide using medication at her home in Kowloon City. The given reason for this was grief from the loss of her mother, who had died of cancer. Her boyfriend discovered her and contacted the police. After being certified as being out of danger of any life-threatening complications, Cheuk stayed in the intensive care unit. The police subsequently found two suicide notes, which revealed her unhappiness. Two weeks later, Cheuk returned to work and continued to host her radio programmes, and also became involved in film production work again.

=== Backlash to wearing fur ===
On 27 February 2012, Cheuk uploaded a photo to her personal Weibo which showed her wearing real fox fur. This caused an angry response from internet users, who denounced her through Facebook, Weibo and Discuss forums; some internet users on Weibo questioned "How can one talk about animal rights, if one can wear a corpse because of vanity?".

On 1 March 2012, Cheuk issued a video response to the incident on YouTube. She referred to the fur in the photo as one no longer wanted by a friend, and said she accepted it for reuse since it was real fur and she did not want to waste it. She emphasised her respect for animal rights and apologised for any distress caused by the incident. Some internet users held the perspective that her statement of respect for animal rights was at odds with her decision to wear fur; they refused to accept the explanation or apology because she did not openly urge the public to refuse fur and due to the lack of an apology for the acts of cruelty to animals that were needed to harvest the fur.

On 4 March 2012, internet users noticed that Cheuk had removed comments about the incident on Facebook, including comments in support of and against her decision to wear fur. The internet users called this into question and said she should not delete comments indiscriminately, since she had set her Facebook as open to the public and usually allowed public comments.
