= Tristar (film) =

1996 Hong Kong film by Tsui Hark

- Film poster

Chinese name
- Traditional Chinese: 大三元
- Simplified Chinese: 大三元
Transcriptions
Standard Mandarin
- Hanyu Pinyin: Dà Sān Yuán
Yue: Cantonese
- Jyutping: Daai6 Saam1 Jyun4
- Directed by: Tsui Hark
- Written by: Tsui Hark; Phillip Cheng; Tiu Wan
- Produced by: Raymond Wong; Tsui Hark
- Starring: Leslie Cheung; Anita Yuen; Lau Ching-wan
- Cinematography: Arthur Wong; Christopher Doyle
- Edited by: Chan Kei-hop; Tony Chow; David Wu
- Music by: Lowell Lo
- Production companies: Mandarin Films; Cinema City & Films; Film Workshop
- Distributed by: Mandarin Films Distribution
- Release date: 15 February 1996
- Running time: 107 minutes
- Country: Hong Kong
- Language: Cantonese
- Box office: HK$25,218,130

Tristar (Chinese: 大三元) is a 1996 Hong Kong comedy film directed by Tsui Hark and starring Leslie Cheung, Anita Yuen and Lau Ching-wan.

== Cast and roles ==
- Leslie Cheung as Chung Kwok-keung
- Anita Yuen as Pak Suet-fa
- Lau Ching-wan as Lau Ching-fat
- Sunny Chan as Hung
- Elvina Kong as Tung Tung
- Catherine Hung as Mary
- Chung King-fai as Dinosaur
- Moses Chan as Chan Chun-nam
- Hung Yan-yan as Loanshark Tai
- Pau Hon-lam as Father John
- Shing Fui-On as Father Robin
- Lee Heung-kam
- Paul Fonoroff as Mormon preacher
- Raymond Wong Pak-ming as Supt. Wong
- Michael Tse as Pedestrian
- Jason Chu as Pedestrian
