= Beyond Hypothermia (film) =

1996 Hong Kong-South Korean film by Patrick Leung

- Film poster
- Directed by: Patrick Leung
- Written by: Roy Szeto
- Produced by: Jung-il Choi; Johnnie To
- Starring: Jacklyn Wu; Sean Lau; Sang Woo Han; Jae-seok Han; Shirley Wong
- Cinematography: Arthur Wong; Cheung Yat-Man; Jeong Il-man
- Edited by: Wong Wing-ming; Hwang Yeong-myeong
- Music by: Chung Siu-hung
- Production companies: Jeong Myeong Films; Milky Way Image Company; Sanqueen Limited
- Distributed by: Newport Entertainment (Hong Kong)
- Release dates: 18 October 1996 (Hong Kong); 21 September 1996 (South Korea)
- Running time: 90 minutes
- Countries: Hong Kong; South Korea
- Languages: Cantonese; Korean
- Box office: HK$2,621,660

Beyond Hypothermia (Chinese: 攝氏32度) is a 1996 action film directed by Patrick Leung, co-produced by Johnnie To, and starring Jacklyn Wu and Sean Lau. The film is co-produced by Hong Kong and South Korea.

== Plot ==
Woo Chin Lin plays a brilliantly skilled hitwoman, Shu Li Fan, who for most of the movie has no name. She also has no family or friends, and for reasons not entirely clear, has a lower than average body temperature. She was rescued as a child from war-ravaged Cambodia, and raised by Mei (Shirley Wong), who is the widow of an assassin. Mei teaches the child the only thing she knows that connects her to the world: contract killing. Shu Li Fan's victims are as mysterious to her as she is to herself. However, during one of her hits she makes a sworn enemy of a Korean killer (Han Sang Woo.) There is one small ray of hope in her grim life, and that is the beginnings of a love affair with a simple and sweet-natured noodle vendor Long Shek (Hong Kong actor Lau Ching Wan.)

== Cast ==
- Jacklyn Wu – Shu Li Han
- Sean Lau – Long Shek
- Sang Woo Han – Yichin

== See also ==
- List of Hong Kong films
- Girls with guns
