= Meng Tingyi =

Chinese actress

Meng Tingyi (Chinese 蒙亭宜) is a Chinese film actress.

== Awards ==
In 2010 Meng won an award for her performance in a short film August 15th, based on a true story about a bus hijacking.

== Filmography ==
- Crimes of Passion (2013)
- Dot 2 Dot (2014)
- Who Is Undercover (2014)
- Royalty in Blood (2015)
