= Tiger Cage 3 =

1991 Hong Kong film by Yuen Woo-ping

- Film poster
- Traditional Chinese: 冷面狙擊手
- Directed by: Yuen Woo-ping
- Written by: Anthony Wong; Patrick Leung
- Produced by: Stephen Shin; Anthony Wong
- Starring: Man Cheung; Kwok Leung Cheung; Michael Wong; Wong Kam-kong; John Cheung
- Cinematography: Ko Chiu-lam
- Music by: Wong Si-yuen
- Production company: D & B Films Co. Ltd.
- Distributed by: D & B Film Distribution
- Release date: 14 November 1991
- Running time: 93 minutes
- Country: Hong Kong
- Language: Cantonese
- Box office: HK $3,410,007.00

Tiger Cage 3 (Cantonese: 冷面狙擊手, literally "Cold-Faced Shooter") is a 1991 Hong Kong action film directed by Yuen Woo-ping. Its English title positions it as a sequel to the 1988 film Tiger Cage and its 1990 sequel Tiger Cage 2, which were also directed by Yuen, though this film features a new storyline with none of the main cast members returning.

== Plot ==
Suki Cheung is a rising financial advisor who often accompanies her boss Mr. Wong to dinner meetings. Her boyfriend James and his best friend John, a CCB officer, place a wire in her purse to find out if she is having an affair. Through the wire the two friends hear Mr. Wong and Mr. Lee bargaining over kickbacks for her boss creating fake accounts to enable Mr. Lee to obtain large loans as well as discussing plans to commit insider trading by purchasing stock in United Corporation before it is purchased by their associate Mr. Cheng. After he takes her home, Mr. Lee attempts to convince Suki to leave her job with Mr. Wong and join him instead but she tells him she will talk it over with Mr. Wong first.

Suki finds the wire and agrees to help James and John investigate Mr. Wong. Meanwhile, Mr. Cheng is thrown into traffic and killed while John buys 100,000 shares of United Corporation stock. The next day in his office Mr. Wong asks Suki to flee with him to escape Mr. Lee. Just then James and John arrest him and seize his files as evidence but Mr. Lee's thugs surprise them, killing Mr. Wong and taking the evidence. John chases them and kills them to retrieve the evidence, including evidence that Mr. Lee was being blackmailed. The value of John's stock falls due to misinformation leaked by Mr. Cheng.

Thugs kidnap Suki and take her to Mr. Lee's boat. Mr. Lee tells James that he has transferred 10 million dollars to his account to make it seem as though James and John were the ones blackmailing him. James chases after them on a small motorboat that they shoot until it explodes, badly burning his face. James is found floating in the water and rescued by fishermen, remaining with them rather than letting anyone know that he is still alive. Mr. Lee's thugs attack the CCB, shooting John and taking the evidence. John awakens in the hospital and is immediately fired by Inspector Chan under suspicion of using information from Mr. Wong's diary to blackmail Mr. Lee.

Suki becomes Mr. Lee's lover and helps him with his schemes. John confronts her, blaming her for James's disappearance. Mr. Lee's thugs arrive and beat John while Suki escapes. Mr. Lee attempts to sign a contract with Sir Liu, who is reluctant due to concerns about Mr. Lee's activities. Mr. Lee tells Suki to seduce Sir Liu and convince him to sign the contract. Suki seduces Sir Liu but double-crosses Mr. Lee and devises a plan with Sir Liu to earn them both money instead. James overhears but Mr. Lee's thugs attack him before John helps him escape.

James is angered by John's claim that Suki is assisting Mr. Lee in his crimes, causing the friends to fall out and John to leave. Mr. Lee's thugs attack and kill White Head the fisherman and Inspector Chan and harpoon James, leaving him for dead. Suki finds James and rescues him. Meanwhile, Mr. Lee becomes tired of being without Suki and instead forces her young secretary to sleep with him. Suki moves ahead with her plan with Sir Liu as John listens in on them using a wire. Suki convinces Mr. Lee that his plan is moving ahead, then lures one of his thugs into a trap where he is killed by James with the help of White Head's surviving fisherman friend.

John confronts Suki and threatens to give Mr. Lee the tape he made of her conspiring with Sir Liu against Mr. Lee. Suki admits that she framed James for the blackmail plot before destroying the tape and kicking John out a window, claiming to James that John had tried to rape her. Sir Liu and Mr. Lee sign the contract just before Mr. Lee is sent the tape by John. Sir Liu runs off with the contract and abandons Suki, who is chased by Mr. Lee and his thugs. Mr. Lee shoots at Suki but James jumps in front of her and is fatally wounded as he also shoots and kills Mr. Lee. Suki tearfully tells James that she loved him too.

== Cast ==
- Man Cheung as Suki Cheung
- Kwok Leung Cheung as James
- Michael Wong as John
- Wong Kam-kong as Lee Siu-pong
- John Cheung as Roy
- Fung Woo as Sir Liu
- Shun Lau as Fisherman
- Michael Dingo as Alex
- Ridley Tsui as Billy
- Suk-mui Tam as Suki's Secretary
- Fai Lau
- Mei-yee Sze as Insp. Chan Tak-shun
- Chi-keung Szeto as Lee Siu-pong's thug
- Wai-lap Fong as William Wong
- Tak-lap Wong
- Tak-kam Wong as Chan
- Siu-ming Lui as Stephen
- Kwok-kit Lam as CCB officer
- Jim James as Joe

== Reception ==
Reviewer Tony Ryan of fareastfilms.com gave the film 4 out of 5 stars, writing, "the action sequences are all above average, and particularly brutal, as is to be expected from a Tiger Cage film. Ultimately, this is equal to – or better – than part 1 for the action, but not the drama, yet is certainly not the equal of part 2 for fight scenes".

In a positive review, reviewer Kozo of lovehkfilm.com wrote: "Your usual Yuen Woo-Ping action is the selling point for this entertaining action flick. The characters aren't very interesting, but it's doubtful that anybody who checks this out will care. And besides, it has Michael Wong".

The website darksidereviews.com gave the film 6.5 out of 10 stars, writing: "Tiger Cage 3 is a bit too many sequels. Not unpleasant, but well below the others, both in terms of action and thrillers".

In the book A Different Brilliance: The D&B Story, author Po Fung called Tiger Cage 3 "a reflection of a downturn in Yuen's creativity, failing to achieve any artistic breakthrough".
