= Who Is Undercover =

2014 film

Who is Undercover
- Directed by: Fan Jianhui
- Release date: December 31, 2014 (China)
- Running time: 90 minutes
- Country: China
- Language: Mandarin
- Box office: ¥30.72 million (China)

Who is Undercover (Chinese: 王牌) is a 2014 Chinese suspense drama film directed by Fan Jianhui. It was released on December 31.

== Cast ==
- Lin Chi-ling
- Tony Leung Ka-fai
- Gillian Chung
- Meng Tingyi
- Vivian Wu
- Christopher Lee
- Kent Cheng
- Kaiser Chuang
- Su Jin
- Liu Lujia
- Lu Yulai

== Reception ==
By January 7, 2015, the film had earned ¥30.72 million at the Chinese box office.
