= Overheard 3 =

2014 Hong Kong-Chinese film by Alan Mak and Felix Chong

- Overheard 3 poster
- Traditional Chinese: 竊聽風雲3
- Simplified Chinese: 窃听风云3
- Directed by: Alan Mak; Felix Chong
- Written by: Alan Mak; Felix Chong
- Produced by: Derek Yee; Ronald Wong
- Starring: Sean Lau; Louis Koo; Daniel Wu; Zhou Xun
- Cinematography: Anthony Pun
- Edited by: Curran Pang
- Music by: Chan Kwong-wing
- Production companies: Sil-Metropole Organisation; Bona Film Group; Pop Movies
- Distributed by: Distribution Workshop (Hong Kong); Bona Film Group (China)
- Release dates: 29 May 2014 (China); 5 June 2014 (Hong Kong)
- Running time: 131 minutes (Hong Kong); 130 minutes (China)
- Countries: Hong Kong; China
- Languages: Cantonese; Mandarin
- Box office: US$53.5 million

Overheard 3 (Chinese: 竊聽風雲3) is a 2014 crime-thriller film written and directed by Alan Mak and Felix Chong and starring Sean Lau, Louis Koo, Daniel Wu, and Zhou Xun. A Hong Kong-Chinese co-production, the film is a sequel to the 2011 film Overheard 2 in which Lau, Koo and Wu play different roles with a different storyline (abolishing the Small House Policy), but the key elements of the previous two films are kept. It was released in China on 29 May 2014 and in Hong Kong on 5 June 2014.

Overheard 3 won three awards at the 34th Hong Kong Film Awards including Best Actor for Lau, Best Supporting Actor for Kenneth Tsang and Best Screenplay, while also nominated for eight other awards.

== Plot ==
In Hong Kong's New Territories, the indigenous Luk clan has dominated rural land for over a century. Under the long-standing Small House Policy, every indigenous male villager can apply to the government to build a three-story detached house exempt from land premium, which has long been controversial. The HKSAR government decides to stop accepting applications for small houses. Property developers plan to consolidate the remaining small house rights and build multi-story "Small House Towers".

Uncle To, New Territories rural tycoon and head of the Luk family, plans to monopolize the entire development project, but other tycoons all want a share. The key swing vote belongs to landowner Yuen, whose decision would determine control of hundreds of acres of ancestral farmland. To eliminate this obstacle, To's chauffeur Law Wing-jau kills Yuen in a staged car crash. Yuen's death enables To to secure the massive development deal. Yuen's widow, Moon, is left devastated and harbors deep hatred toward Wing-jau and the Luk family.

Five years later, Wing-jau is released from prison. By then, the Luk family has transformed into New Territories' largest property empire. Fellow villagers working under To, including Luk Kam-keung, do not want to share the spoils with him despite having taken the fall for the murder. Under the direction of To's daughter Luk Wing-yu, Wing-jau drugs everyone's drinks to knock them out. He also recruits a computer whiz he met in prison, Joe, to implant spyware into Kam-keung and the others' mobile phones, secretly monitoring their every move.

During the wiretapping operation, Joe unexpectedly meets Moon and gradually becomes emotionally involved with her, despite her materialism and initial mistrust. Through continuous surveillance, Wing-jau uncovers a massive conspiracy by Kam-keung and his associates. After a violent power struggle between the various forces, Kam-keung has a change of heart, turning against the family's corruption. In the aftermath, the Luk empire is shattered. Joe is imprisoned for his role in the surveillance operation but is eventually released and reunites with Moon.

== Cast ==
- Sean Lau as Luk Kam-keung
- Louis Koo as Law Wing-jau
- Daniel Wu as Joe
- Zhou Xun as Moon
- Michelle Ye as Luk Wing-yu
- Alex Fong as Fu
- Kenneth Tsang as Uncle To
- Ng Man-tat as Szeto
- Huang Lei as Wan
- Gordon Lam as Paul
- Dominic Lam as Chuck
- Huang Yi as Fu's wife
- Chin Ka-lok as Yuen
- Wilfred Lau as Dragon boy
- Vincent Kok as Computer expert
- Law Lan as Aunt Gil
- Yeung Ying-wai as Villagers A
- Kwok Fung as Uncle Nine
- Vincent Lo as Sunny
- Ben Yuen as Worker B
- Felix Lok as Mark
- Tony Ho as Head of trucker
- Lung Tin-sang as Hung
- Candy Yuen as a prostitute (uncredited)

== Reception ==
Boon Chan of The Straits Times states "The complicated web of relationships and land dealings plus the high-tech electronic monitoring make Overheard 3 feel overstuffed and underwhelming."

Gabriel Chong of Moviexclusive.com gave the film a 2.5 out of 5 stars, and states "Compared to its predecessors too, the storytelling goes bogged down in way too much exposition particularly in the middle segment."

The film grossed ¥27.7 million (US$4.43 million) on the opening day in China.

== Awards and nominations ==
Ceremony	Category	Recipient	Results
34th Hong Kong Film Awards	Best Film	Overheard 3	Nominated
34th Hong Kong Film Awards	Best Director	Alan Mak, Felix Chong	Nominated
34th Hong Kong Film Awards	Best Screenplay	Alan Mak, Felix Chong	Won
34th Hong Kong Film Awards	Best Actor	Sean Lau	Won
34th Hong Kong Film Awards	Best Supporting Actor	Kenneth Tsang	Won
34th Hong Kong Film Awards	Best Supporting Actor	Alex Fong	Nominated
34th Hong Kong Film Awards	Best Cinematography	Anthony Pun	Nominated
34th Hong Kong Film Awards	Best Film Editing	Curran Pang	Nominated
34th Hong Kong Film Awards	Best Art Direction	Man Lim-chung	Nominated
34th Hong Kong Film Awards	Best Costume Make up Design	Man Lim-chung	Nominated
34th Hong Kong Film Awards	Best Sound Design	Kinson Tsang	Nominated
21st Hong Kong Film Critics Society Awards	Best Film	Overheard 3	Won
21st Hong Kong Film Critics Society Awards	Best Director	Alan Mak, Felix Chong	Nominated
21st Hong Kong Film Critics Society Awards	Best Screenplay	Alan Mak, Felix Chong	Won
21st Hong Kong Film Critics Society Awards	Best Actor	Sean Lau	Won
21st Hong Kong Film Critics Society Awards	Best Actress	Zhou Xun	Nominated
21st Hong Kong Film Critics Society Awards	Best Actress	Michelle Ye	Nominated
21st Hong Kong Film Critics Society Awards	Film of Merit	Overheard 3	Won
9th Hong Kong Film Directors' Guild Awards	Best Actor	Sean Lau	Won
9th Asian Film Awards	Best Actor	Sean Lau	Nominated
15th Chinese Film Media Awards	Most Watched Film	Overheard 3	Nominated
