= Golden Chicken 3 =

2014 Hong Kong film by Matt Chow

- Hong Kong poster
- Directed by: Matt Chow
- Screenplay by: Matt Chow
- Produced by: Sandra Ng
- Starring: Sandra Ng
- Cinematography: Edmond Fung
- Edited by: Azrael Chung
- Music by: Alan Wong; Janet Yung
- Production companies: Edko Films Ltd. One Cool Group Limited; Joseph Kaufman Productions
- Release date: 30 January 2014
- Running time: 100 minutes
- Country: Hong Kong
- Language: Cantonese
- Box office: HK$40,852,011 (US$5,264,026) (as of 2 March 2014)

Golden Chicken 3, also known as Golden Chickensss (Chinese: 金雞SSS), is a 2014 Hong Kong comedy film directed by Matt Chow and starring Sandra Ng.

== Cast ==
- Sandra Ng as Kam, a prostitute
- Andy Lau as himself (billed as "Suddenly Starring")
- Donnie Yen as Master Yip
- Louis Koo as Jiangmen Louis Koo
- Tony Leung Ka-fai as Professor Chan
- Nick Cheung as Gordon
- Dayo Wong as Master Thirteen
- Shawn Yue as a brothel frequenter and Hikikomori
- Eason Chan as Jackie
- Ronald Cheng as Stone Age caveman / Mak Kei, the king of gigolos
- Chapman To as Tin Chung, the plastic surgeon and brothel frequenter
- Anthony Wong as the Tang Dynasty brothel frequenter
- Wyman Wong as Takuya, a Japanese gigolo
- Edison Chen as Nemoto Kishihisashii, a Japanese brothel owner
- Alex To as Joey Ma, a pimp
- Lo Hoi-pang as Mr. Au Yeung
- Chin Kar-lok as Mr. Chan, the company owner and brothel frequenter
- Hins Cheung as King Hin, a gigolo
- Cheung Siu-fai as Brother Siu Fai
- William So as Kung
- Jim Chim as Brother Chai Nga, a Chinese herbalist and Kam's old client
- Fiona Sit as La Ma, a prostitute
- Elena Kong as saleswoman
- Ivana Wong as Ng Lo, a prostitute under Kam
- Michelle Wai as Fa, a prostitute under Kam

== Awards and nominations ==
- Annual 34th Hong Kong Film Awards
  - Nomination – Best Actress (Sandra Ng Kwun-Yu)
  - WON – Best Supporting Actress (Ivana Wong)
  - WON – Best New Performer (Ivana Wong)
  - Nomination – Best Original Film Song- "Brand New Hong Kong"- Composer/Lyrics: My Little Airport -Singer: Nicole Au Kin-ying

== Reception ==
The film has grossed HK$40.8 million (US$5.26 million).
