= The Twins Effect II =

2004 Hong Kong film by Corey Yuen and Patrick Leung

- Film poster

Chinese name
- Traditional Chinese: 千機變II花都大戰
- Simplified Chinese: 千机变II花都大战
Transcriptions
Standard Mandarin
- Hanyu Pinyin: Qiān Jī Biàn Èr Huādū Dàzhàn
Yue: Cantonese
- Jyutping: Cin1 Gei1 Bin3 Ji6 Fa1 Dou1 Daai6 Zin3
- Directed by: Corey Yuen; Patrick Leung
- Written by: Chan Kin-chung; Roy Szeto; Chit Ka-kei; Lam Suet; Michelle Tsui
- Produced by: Albert Lee; Zhao Jianguo
- Starring: Donnie Yen; Jaycee Chan; Charlene Choi; Gillian Chung; Bolin Chen; Tony Leung Ka-fai; Qu Ying; Fan Bingbing; Jackie Chan; Daniel Wu; Edison Chen; Jim Chim
- Cinematography: Chan Chi-ying; Chan Kwok-hung
- Edited by: Cheung Ka-fai
- Music by: Tommy Wai
- Production companies: Emperor Motion Pictures; Emperor Classic Films; Shenzhen Film Studio
- Distributed by: Emperor Motion Pictures
- Release date: 6 August 2004
- Running time: 104 minutes
- Country: Hong Kong
- Language: Cantonese

The Twins Effect II is a 2004 Hong Kong action fantasy adventure film directed by Corey Yuen and Patrick Leung. The film is a sequel to The Twins Effect (2003) but has a completely different story from the first film. It starred Charlene Choi and Gillian Chung of Cantopop duo Twins in the leading roles. Co-stars include Donnie Yen, Daniel Wu, Edison Chen, Wilson Chen, Tony Leung Ka-fai, Qu Ying, Fan Bingbing and Jim Chim. Jackie Chan also makes a cameo appearance, along with his son Jaycee Chan in his acting debut. The film's original English working title was The Huadu Chronicles: Blade of the Rose and its American DVD release title is Blade of Kings.

== Plot ==
The film is set in Flower Capital, a land ruled by an evil queen (Qu Ying) who started hating men after her lover, High Priest Wei Liao (Daniel Wu), betrayed her. All men in the kingdom are slaves to women. However, a prophecy foretells that one day, the Star of Rex will find and wield a mythic sword, rise to power, overthrow the queen, and restore the balance of the two sexes.

At the start of the movie, Crouching Tiger Hidden Dragon (Donnie Yen), a master swordsman who has made it his quest to overthrow the queen's regime, has commissioned Peachy (Edison Chen) to steal for him a certain engraved stone from the queen's palace. Peachy is successful, but the queen's soldiers and spies pursue him. Before the stone can be recaptured, it comes into the possession of Peachy's two friends Charcoal Head (Jaycee Chan) and Blockhead (Bolin Chen), who like Peachy earn a humble living by street-performing in a troupe led by their adoptive father, Blackwood.

The two set out to deliver the stone to Crouching Tiger Hidden Dragon, along the way discovering the stone is actually a map, which they assume will lead them to riches. Before they can meet Crouching Tiger Hidden Dragon, they are intercepted by two lovely, but lethal, female warriors, Spring (Charlene Choi) and Blue Bird (Gillian Chung), each of whom is pursuing the pair for different reasons. The four agree to follow the map together, eventually learning that the map leads to the mythic sword and that either Charcoal Head or Blockhead is the Star of Rex. The journey takes them through dangerous terrain, culminating in an encounter with the Lord of Armour (Jackie Chan), who guards the way to the sword.

Even as the four make their way toward the sword, the queen is preparing for their destruction, using her army and her powerful magic. A final battle will decide the fate of the land.

== Cast ==
- Donnie Yen as General Lone
- Jaycee Chan as Charcoal Head/Star of Rex
- Charlene Choi as Spring/13th Master
- Gillian Chung as Blue Bird
- Bolin Chen as Blockhead
- Tony Leung Ka-fai as Master Blackwood
- Qu Ying as the Evil Queen
- Fan Bingbing as Red Vulture
- Jackie Chan as General Wai Shing/Lord of Armour (cameo appearance)
- Daniel Wu as High Priest Wei Liao (special appearance)
- Edison Chen as Peachy (guest appearance)
- Jim Chim as Palupa
- Xie Jingjing as Marshall Edo Bowman
- Steven Cheung as a slave
- Kenny Kwan as a slave
- Sam Chan as a slave
- Kam Siu-wai as a slave
- Mou Kit as a slave
- Leung Yuet-wan as a slave buyer
- Lee Nga as the palace guard commander
