= Brand New Hong Kong =

Song by My Little Airport

from the album The Right Age For Marriage
- Language: Cantonese
- Released: 11 February 2014
- Length: 1:57
- Songwriter(s): Lam Ah P
- Producer(s): My Little Airport

Brand New Hong Kong (Chinese: 美麗新香港) is a song released by the Hong Kong–based indie pop band My Little Airport in 2014. Originally the title for a movie's theme song, it subsequently evolved into a political term describing the contemporary social situation following the introduction of the national security law in 2020.

== Song ==
Brand New Hong Kong is the theme song of Golden Chicken 3, a 2014 Hong Kong comedy film. It was released on 11 February 2014, and is included in the studio album "The Right Age For Marriage" published in October 2014.

The Chinese name of the song is believed to be named after Brave New World, the dystopian science fiction. It is translated into various English names, including "Brave New Hong Kong" and "New Brave Hong Kong".

The single was nominated for the Best Original Film Song in the next year's Hong Kong Film Award (HKFA).

== Political implication ==
Politics, a consistent theme after the 2014 Umbrella Movement, were implicated in the song by the band, which has supported local democracy movements. In the song the narrator subtly expresses the frustrations about the Chinese control over the city, complaining "this Hong Kong no longer belongs to me".

During the awards ceremony of HKFA, My Little Airport performed the song with the out-of-tune British anthem God Save the Queen at the end. It became the subject of controversy as the television live was cut short, while Global Times, the Chinese state media, criticised the music group for infiltrating pro-coloniser political sentiments. The song was banned in China by September 2019 as My Little Airport was labelled as "heavily pro-democracy".

In 2020, the Chinese Government imposed the national security law on Hong Kong in the aftermath of the anti-extradition bill protest. Since then, the opposition was suppressed as leading democrats were jailed, while the civil society faces tremendous challenges.

A day after Apple Daily, the largest pro-democracy newspaper, was forced to close following two raids by the national security police, then-Chief Executive Carrie Lam elaborated on her desired Hong Kong, in response to a question asking if the city is now "Brand New Hong Kong".

Reporter: [...] On Tuesday at this place an Apple Daily reporter asked you whether the national security law is still impacting only a handful of people after 800 would lose their jobs, you did not give an answer. Is it true that a Hong Kong without “4 June”, “1 July”, and Apple Daily is the Brand New Hong Kong in your vision? Is this event an exchange by you for the Central Government’s support for your re-election?

Chief Executive: […] The Hong Kong in my vision is that it utilises the “Two Systems” granted by the state based on “One Country”, provided that “One Country, Two Systems” is accurately and comprehensively implemented; that it has high economic openness; that it protects the rights and freedom which shall be enjoyed by the citizens in accordance with the law. However, lawbreakers should, of course, be brought to justice under the spirit of rule of law, and therefore the SAR Government took this view in regards to the Hong Kong National Security Law that has been implemented for a year.

The situation in Hong Kong where "absurdity became the norm" after the crackdown on the 2019 protests and the national security law's promulgation was said to be what "brand new" means. While some said the song predicted the future of Hong Kong, others pointed to the lyrics which resonate through the democracy camp, including the mass migration or fleeing as in "This Hong Kong is no longer my turf. Just try to think I'm drifting elsewhere".
