= Break Up 100 =

2014 Hong Kong film by Lawrence Cheng

- Film poster
- Directed by: Lawrence Cheng
- Written by: Skipper Cheng; Hau Wing-Hang; Lawrence Cheng
- Produced by: Connie Wong
- Starring: Ekin Cheng; Chrissie Chau; Ivana Wong
- Cinematography: Kenny Tse
- Edited by: Wong Hoi
- Music by: Chan Kwong-wing
- Production companies: Sun Entertainment Culture; Media Asia Films
- Release date: 1 August 2014
- Running time: 105 minutes
- Country: Hong Kong
- Language: Cantonese
- Box office: HK$7.03 million (Hong Kong)

Break Up 100 (分手100次) is a 2014 Hong Kong romantic comedy film directed by Lawrence Cheng.

== Plot ==
Sam (Cheng) and his girlfriend Barbara (Chau) open up a joint cafe - the "LA Cafe Pillowcase". It later becomes a hotspot for recently separated couples to share their stories and memorabilia from past relationships.

== Cast ==
- Ekin Cheng
- Chrissie Chau
- Ivana Wong
- C AllStar
- Miriam Yeung
- Eric Kot
- Chin Kar-Lok
- Angela Tong

== Reception ==
The film has earned HK$7.03 million in Hong Kong.

In South China Morning Post's 48 Hours magazine, Yvonne Teh gave the film 3 out of 5 stars.
