= Dot 2 Dot =

2014 Hong Kong film by Amos Why

- Dot 2 Dot 2014 film poster
- Directed by: Amos Why
- Written by: Amos Why
- Produced by: Amos Why. Teresa Kwong. Heidi Ng
- Starring: Moses Chan; Meng Tingyi; Lam Tze-chung; Susan Yam Yam Shaw; David Siu
- Cinematography: Zachary Au; Angus Tai
- Edited by: Stanley Tam; Mary Stephen
- Music by: Henry Lau
- Distributed by: Golden Scene Company
- Release date: 30 October 2014
- Running time: 90 minutes
- Country: Hong Kong
- Languages: Cantonese; Putonghua; Northeastern Mandarin; Hong Kong Sign Language

Dot 2 Dot
- Traditional Chinese: 點對點
- Simplified Chinese: 点对点
Transcriptions

Dot 2 Dot (Cantonese 點對點 Dim dui dim) is a 2014 Hong Kong drama film directed by Amos Why, starring Moses Chan, Meng Tingyi, Lam Tze-chung, Susan Shaw Yin-yin and David Siu, first screened at the Hong Kong International Film Festival 2014. It went on general release on 30 October 2014.

== Plot ==
Xiao Xue (Meng Tingyi), a mainland Chinese teacher who has moved to Hong Kong, becomes fascinated by dot patterned graffiti near MTR stations. Convinced that the dots form a pattern, she sets out to crack the code. Along the way she discovers various facets of Hong Kong's distinct history and identity.

== Cast ==
- Moses Chan - Suet-chung Wong
- Candy Cheung - Sin-yi
- Meng Tingyi
- Lam Tze-chung - Fat man
- Susan Yam Yam Shaw - Headmaster
- David Siu - Daniel Wong
- Amos Why - Policeman
