= Rosemary Vandenbroucke =

French-born model, musician, and actress

- Chinese: 虹萱
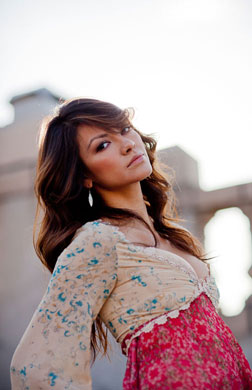
- Vandenbroucke in 2012
- Born: September 18, 1981 (age 44); France
- Other names: Rose Vandenbroucke
- Occupations: Singer, model, actress, yoga instructor
- Spouse: Jason Swamy

Rosemary Vandenbroucke (Chinese: 虹萱; pinyin: Hóng Xuān; Jyutping: hung4 hyun1; born September 18, 1981) is a French-born model, singer, songwriter, actress, and certified yoga instructor.

== Early life ==
In 1981, Vandenbroucke was born in Hong Kong. Vandenbroucke's father is French-Russian and her mother Julie is Chinese. Vandenbroucke grew up in France. At age 13, Vandenbroucke returned to Hong Kong.

== Career ==
At age 14, Vandenbroucke won the second Elite Model Look contest, and in 1998 became model for the Yves Saint Laurent brand. In 2006, Vandenbroucke's debut album is in English, but includes Mandarin versions of two singles, "In my dreams" and "I didn't know", and a Cantonese version of a third, "Tonight."

In acting, Vandenbroucke starred in the Singaporean musical drama television series The Kitchen Musical. The series premiered on 21 October 2011 and has been broadcast in 19 countries across Southeast Asia and Europe. Vandenbroucke was nominated for the best actress in a drama series at the 52nd Monte Carlo Film and Television Awards 2012.

In 2010, Vandenbroucke was arrested while attending the Burning Man festival near Reno, Nevada, facing misdemeanor and felony charges. Vandenbroucke pled guilty to obstructing a police officer in a plea where she served no jail time and was fined $1,000.

In 2016, Vandenbroucke produced a Daybreaker dance-party in Hong Kong. Vandenbroucke has been a certified yoga instructor.

== Filmography ==
- 2001 La Brassiere - Eileen.
- 2003 Spy Dad - Rosemary.
- 2010 Hot Summer Days - Beach girl.
- 2016 Lady Bloodfight - Yara.

== Personal life ==
Vandenbroucke is fluent in English, French, Cantonese and Mandarin. In 2013 at the end of the Great Wall Marathon, Jason Swamy proposed to Vandenbroucke. On December 6, 2015, Vandenbroucke married Jason Swamy in India. Jason Swamy is a creator and director of festivals in United States.

== Discography ==
- Dreams come true Rogers Music 2006, single
- The Kitchen Musical Soundtrack Universal Music 2012, Album
