= La Brassiere =

2001 Hong Kong film by Chan Hing-ka

- DVD cover
- Traditional Chinese: 絕世好Bra
- Simplified Chinese: 绝世好Bra
- Hanyu Pinyin: Jué Shì Hǎo Bra
- Jyutping: Zyut6 Sai3 Ho2 Bra
- Directed by: Chan Hing-ka; Patrick Leung
- Written by: Chan Hing-ka; Amy Chin
- Produced by: Amy Chin
- Starring: Lau Ching-wan; Louis Koo; Carina Lau; Gigi Leung
- Cinematography: Anthony Pun
- Edited by: Chan Kei-hop
- Music by: Anthony Chue; Chiu Tsang-hei
- Distributed by: China Star Entertainment Group
- Release date: 27 September 2001 (Hong Kong)
- Running time: 105 minutes
- Country: Hong Kong
- Languages: Cantonese; Japanese
- Box office: HK$18,500,484

La Brassiere (simplified Chinese: 绝世好Bra; traditional Chinese: 絕世好Bra) is a 2001 Hong Kong romantic comedy film starring Lau Ching-wan, Louis Koo, Carina Lau and Gigi Leung. The film was followed by a sequel, titled Mighty Baby, which was released in 2002.

== Plot ==
The film's underlying plot is to create the "ultimate brassiere" for a Japanese company specialising in this undergarment. Samantha (Carina Lau), who is managing the Hong Kong subsidiary of the company, is the project leader of this assignment and she appoints two zany but highly creative designers to aid her in that project, Wayne (Louis Koo) and Johnny (Lau Ching-wan). Johnny flirts with Samantha soon enough, being engaged in such a work, which he claims would assist in his creative powers although the story was more engaged in the humorous efforts in creating the bra. However, Samantha snubbed his overtures and their love affair remained in balance.

Meanwhile, during the project various prototypes were tried and tested, but with appalling results. Apparently, Wayne and Johnny being both male were unable to realise the finer points of creating the undergarment. Lena (Gigi Leung), a lover of Wayne and also working on the project then got the inspiration that the "ultimate bra" is the one which incorporates the feeling a woman has when her male lover lovingly supports her breasts. Accordingly, the two designers created just such an undergarment and was approved by their Japanese employers.

== Cast ==
- Lau Ching-wan as Johnny
- Louis Koo as Wayne
- Carina Lau as Samantha
- Gigi Leung as Lena
- Lee San-san as Candy
- Chikako Aoyama as Nanako
- GC Goo-Bi as Gigi
- Rosemary Vandenbroucke as Eileen, the "in-house model"
- Kristal Tin as Ballroom manager
- Asuka Higuchi as Suki
- Maria Chan as Jolene
- John Chan as 1st designer job applicant
- Michael Wai as 2nd designer job applicant (photographer)
- Matt Chow as 3rd designer job applicant
- Wing Shya as 4th designer job applicant (director)
- Dante Lam as 5th designer job applicant (bartender)
- Chan Wan-wan as Sharon
- Lau Siu-mui as Siu-mui
- Ng Choi-yuk as Yoko
- Liz Li as ET
- Renee Wong as Renee
- Yeung Man-kei as Maggie
- Chung Kiu-chi as Gigi
- Wong Aou-bik as Julibee
- Lau Yee-san as Phyllisia
- Patrick Tam as Ali Bra Bra
- Caroline Caron as Model
- Scotea as Louis
- Vindy Chan as Louis's wife
- Karen Mok as Shirley
- Jo Kuk as Alex
- Stephen Fung as Fung
- Ji-gang Mei-sui as Miko
- Steve Mullins as Hotel manager
- Sai Samone as Bra material analyst
- Tam Tin-po as Bra shop customer
- Michael Clements as Samantha's client
- Otto Chan as Young molester

== Theme song ==
- Intimate (貼心)
  - Composer: Chiu Tseng-hei
  - Lyricist: Keith Chan Siu-kei
  - Singer: Gigi Leung
