= Run, Tiger, Run =

1984 Hong Kong film by John Woo

- Film poster
- Traditional Chinese: 兩隻老虎
- Hanyu Pinyin: liǎng zhī lǎohǔ
- Jyutping: loeng5 zek3 lou5 fu2
- Directed by: John Woo
- Written by: Raymond Wong
- Produced by: John Woo; Raymond Wong
- Starring: Teddy Robin; Bin Bin; Hsiao Hui Ting; Hark Tsui
- Cinematography: Lin Tsan-ting
- Edited by: Huang Chiu-Kuei
- Music by: Chang Hung-Yi; Peter Chang
- Production company: Cinema City Company Limited
- Release date: 1984
- Running time: 87 minutes
- Country: Hong Kong
- Language: Cantonese

Run, Tiger, Run is a 1984 Hong Kong comedy film written by Raymond Wong and directed by John Woo. The film marks the first collaboration between John Woo and Tsui Hark.

== Plot ==
Living on the streets homeless boys Teddy and Benny befriend a rich boy who is heir to his grandpa's great fortune. His uncle mistakes all them for his nephews and wanting to steal the inheritance for himself abducts Benny. To save him Teddy teams up with his friends and assassin Mortal Lips to pull off a rescue mission.

== Cast ==
- Teddy Robin as Teddy Shit
- Bin Bin as Little Benny
- Hsiao Hui Ting as Mortal Lips
- Hark Tsui as Grandpa Steak

== Production ==
The film was shot in Taiwan.
