= Vengeance (2009 film) =

2009 Hong Kong-French film by Johnnie To

- Theatrical release poster
- Directed by: Johnnie To
- Screenplay by: Wai Ka-Fai
- Produced by: Michèle Pétin; Laurent Pétin; Johnnie To; Wai Ka-Fai; John Chong; Peter Lam
- Starring: Johnny Hallyday; Anthony Wong; Gordon Lam; Lam Suet; Simon Yam; Michelle Ye; Sylvie Testud
- Cinematography: Cheng Siu-Keung
- Edited by: David Richardson
- Music by: Lo Tayu
- Production company: Milkyway Image
- Distributed by: ARP Sélection; Media Asia Films
- Release dates: 20 May 2009 (France); 20 August 2009 (Hong Kong)
- Running time: 109 minutes
- Countries: Hong Kong; France
- Languages: English; French; Cantonese
- Budget: $11.5 million (€9 million)
- Box office: $1,346,952

Vengeance (Chinese: 復仇) is a 2009 action thriller film co-produced and directed by Johnnie To, and written by Wai Ka-Fai. It stars Johnny Hallyday, Anthony Wong, Gordon Lam, Lam Suet, Simon Yam, Michelle Ye and Sylvie Testud. The film tells the story of Francis Costello, a French chef and former assassin whose daughter, son-in-law and grandchildren are attacked by a gang of Triads. Costello travels to Macau to embark on a quest for revenge, enlisting the aid of three hitmen. The film explores the themes of assassination, violence and the influence of Triads in modern society. Produced by Milkyway Image, the film was released by ARP Sélection in France, and Media Asia Films in Hong Kong.

The idea of To directing an English-language film originated with ARP co-founders Michèle and Laurent Pétin, who had Alain Delon in mind for the lead role. In 2006, after Delon turned down the role, the Pétins recommended Hallyday, who was cast in the lead role after meeting with To in early 2008. Principal photography began in November 2008, and concluded in January 2009; filming took place on locations in Hong Kong and Macau, with a crew mainly based in Hong Kong.

Vengeance competed for the Palme d'Or at the 62nd Cannes Film Festival, and was released theatrically in France on 20 May 2009. The film was later released in Hong Kong on 20 August 2009. It premiered in North America at the 2009 Toronto International Film Festival. Vengeance was met with positive reviews, with several critics praising To's direction, Hallyday's performance, the cinematography and editing. During its theatrical run, the film grossed over US$1.3 million worldwide, having been released in Asia and parts of Europe. In the United States, the film was distributed by IFC Films, which made it available as a video-on-demand selection on pay television formats. The film was nominated for Best Original Film Score at the 29th Hong Kong Film Awards.

== Plot ==
In Macau, three men break into a house, shoot Irene Costello (Sylvie Testud) and kill her husband and two children. Irene's father, Francis Costello (Johnny Hallyday), arrives to visit his daughter who is now suffering from serious injuries. She is nevertheless able to tell her father that there were three shooters and that she shot one of the killers in the ear. At a hotel, Costello meets Kwai (Anthony Wong), Chu (Lam Ka-Tung) and Fat Lok (Lam Suet), a trio of hitmen who are hired to murder the unfaithful wife of Triad crime boss George Fung (Simon Yam). After overhearing the murder in a hotel room, Costello reaches an unspoken agreement to walk away. Costello later tracks down Kwai's syndicate and asks them to help him avenge his daughter's family's deaths in exchange for huge payment and even the ownership of his own restaurant. Before doing so though, he takes a Polaroid picture of each of the hitmen, and writes their names on the pictures so that he will not forget who they are due to his memory problem. The four go to the apartment where the shooting occurred and work out what happened, the number of shooters and the weapons used.

The four visit a landfill to meet Kwai's cousin Tony, who supplies illegal arms. Tony tells them that he "sawed off" a matching weapon for a Hong Kong hitman who works on Seafood Street. As the four men reach the street, they see a man with a bandage over his ear. However, they see only two men. Kwai's syndicate decide to wait until the men lead them to the third attacker. The two suspects head towards the countryside as Kwai's syndicate follows.

The two men later reach a nature reserve as the third killer shows up. The trio meet their wives, their kids and Kwai's syndicate during a barbecue. After a tense standoff, they explain that they killed Costello's grandchildren because the children had seen their faces. Not wanting to start a shootout in front of the three attackers' wives and children, everyone waits until they have left. A moonlit gun battle ensues, with both sides suffering injuries. The three attackers flee, while Costello and Kwai's syndicate take refuge at a run-down apartment in Hong Kong to treat their wounds. Costello reveals that he is a former assassin and has had a bullet in his head for twenty years, which is affecting his memory.

Shortly after they have tended to their wounds, Kwai receives a phone call from triad boss Fung, who informs him that three of his men need help, and are with an underground non-registered doctor known as "Old Five". Fung tells Kwai that his men were attacked by three Chinese men and one white man. The four men realize that Fung ordered the hit on Costello's daughter and her family. They head to the dwelling and kill the three attackers but leave Old Five alive, who telephones Fung reporting what had happened. Fung then contacts Kwai, explaining that Thompson Cheung Chi-shun, Costello's son-in-law, was handing over Fung's financial reports to the police, and that he only ordered his men to kill the parents. Kwai replies that his syndicate has switched their loyalty from Fung to Costello as a matter of honor.

Later that night, Fung sends more killers to Kwai's refuge in order to eliminate Kwai's syndicate. A gunfight ensues, with the four men emerging victorious. As they escape, Kwai's syndicate lose track of Costello, who is walking through a crowded street, seemingly lost in the night rain. He pulls out the Polaroid pictures that he took of the hitmen earlier, and tries to find them in the crowd. They meet again, but it becomes evident that Costello has a problem with his memory, and has rapidly forgotten who his friends are, but also what he is doing. The hitmen try to explain to Costello that he is seeking revenge for his daughter, but Costello does not recognize her, nor does he understand the concept of revenge. The three men give up in despair, and take him to a beach where they meet Kwai's friend, Big Mama (Michelle Ye), a pregnant woman with a group of children. Kwai gives her a stack of money and ask her to take care of Costello. Kwai's syndicate return to Macau because they lost contact with Kwai's cousin Tony who supplies their ammunition. When they reach the landfill where Tony is living, they find him and his partner dying as they were tortured by Fung and his gang. Soon, a large group of assassins sent by Fung show up and a gunfight ensues. Kwai, Chu and Fat Lok are killed. Costello and Big Mama learn of the shootout during a news report. Later that night Costello has a vision of the 3 Hitman and Irene in the afterlife, implying his daughter died of her injures and also reminding him of his mission for revenge against Fung.

The next day, Fung is having tea in a public square surrounded by his subordinates. He sees a beautiful woman (actually is Big Mama) having tea in the same square. As he tries to get her attention, a large group of children come asking him to buy charity stickers. The children place stickers on Fung and his men. Big Mama leaves the square and meets up with Costello, then tells him that the man back in the square with the most number of stickers is Fung. Costello thanks her, makes his way to the square and begins to shoot a great many of the guards as well as Fung as chaos ensues. However, Fung turns out to be wearing a bulletproof vest. His subordinates help him run away from Costello, who gives chase on foot. As Costello walks, he checks the bystanders for stickers, which tips Fung off to the fact that Costello does not actually recognize him, apart from the stickers he is wearing. Fung removes the stickers from his coat, and puts them on the jacket of a subordinate instead. This causes Costello to shoot Fung's subordinate. Fung then removes his coat with all the stickers and runs off.

Costello picks up the trenchcoat and shoots more subordinates who get in his way. Fung is finally the last surviving member, so he attempts to walk nonchalantly by Costello, relying on the Frenchman's inability to recognize him without the coat, but as he is walking by, Costello sees a sticker on Fung's tie. Both men shoot at each other. Fung is hit and Costello demands that he put the coat on, which Fung refuses, so Costello shoots him in the leg. Fung puts the coat on, Costello checks the bullet holes in the coat and sees that they align with the bullets stuck in the bullet-proof vest he was wearing. Costello then stands up and fires a round into Fung's head, killing him. Costello is last seen eating and laughing with Big Mama and her children.

== Cast ==
- Johnny Hallyday plays Francis Costello, a retired assassin turned chef. The character is named after Jef Costello, the lead character played by Alain Delon in Jean-Pierre Melville's 1967 film Le Samouraï.
- Anthony Wong plays Kwai, a Hong Kong hitman who agrees to assist Costello during his visit to Macau.
- Lam Suet plays Fay Lok, Kwai's partner in crime. Lam's voice is dubbed by Conroy Chan.
- Gordon Lam plays Chu, another one of Kwai's partners in crime. Lam's voice is dubbed by Terence Yin.
- Simon Yam plays George Fung, the film's antagonist. He is a crime boss of Lok, Chu and Kwai.

Other cast members include Sylvie Testud as Irene Costello-Thompson, Costello's daughter; Michelle Ye as Big Mama, a pregnant woman who aids Costello in his fight for revenge; and Vincent Sze as Mr. Thompson Cheung Chi-shun, Irene's husband and the father of her two children. Eddie Cheung, Berg Ng, Felix Wong appear as Python, Wolf and Crow, a trio of hitmen hired to kill Irene and her family. Maggie Shiu plays Inspector Wong, a Hong Kong police inspector, and Alan Chui Chung-San as George Fung's bodyguard.

== Production ==
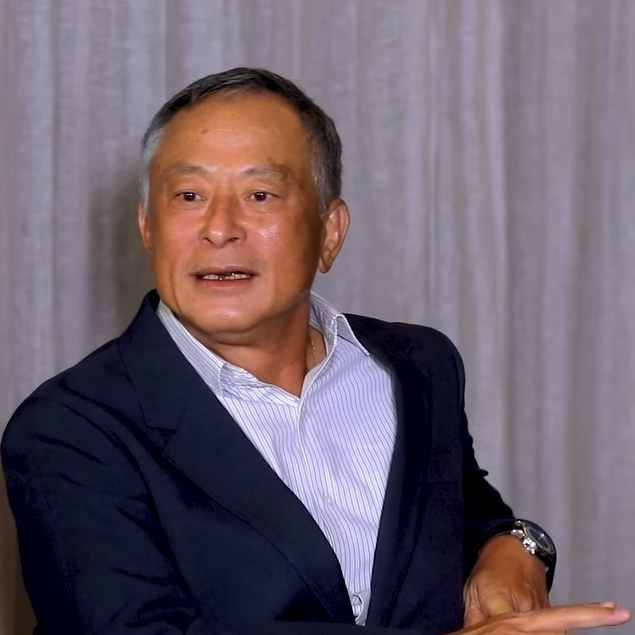
Co-producer and director Johnnie To

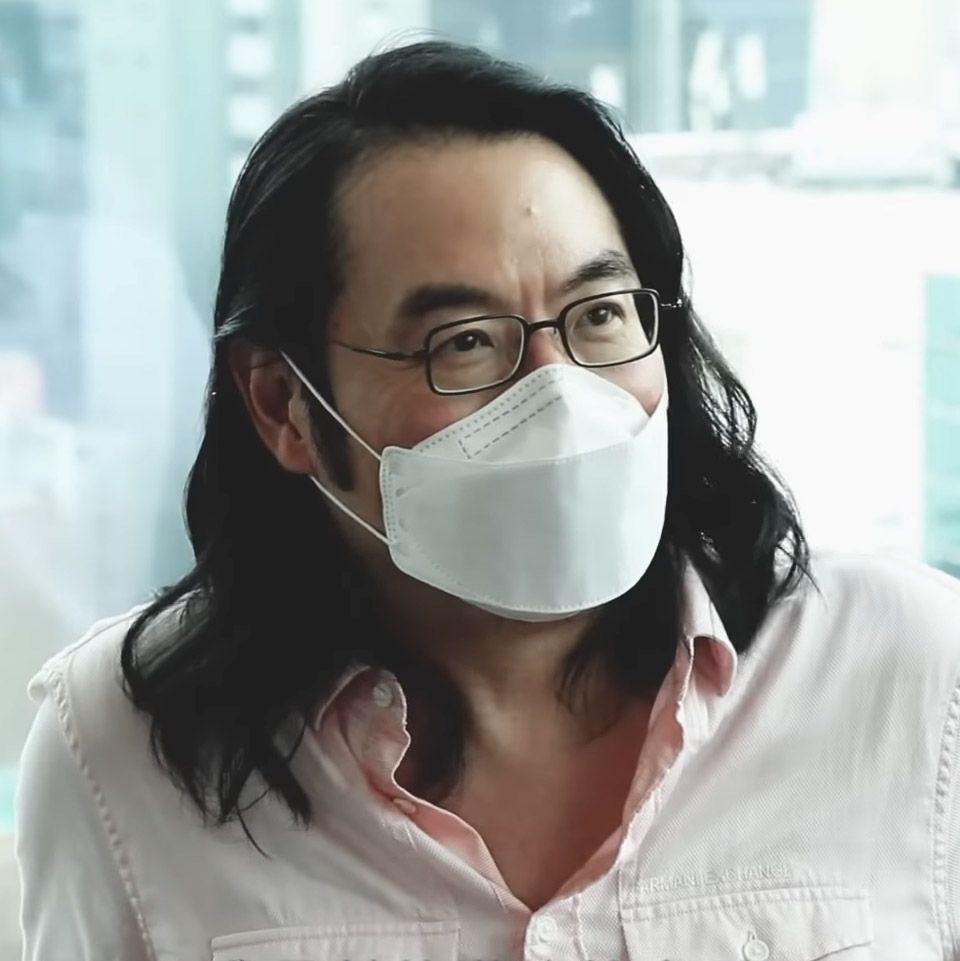
Co-producer and screenwriter Wai Ka-fai

=== Crew ===
Vengeance is a French–Hong Kong co-production between Hong Kong company Media Asia and French distributor ARP Sélection. The film was produced by Milkyway Image, the Hong Kong independent production company founded by Johnnie To and Wai Ka-fai. The film reunites To and Wai, following their collaboration on the 2007 Hong Kong film Mad Detective. The crew for Vengeance were based mainly in Hong Kong, and were previous contributors of To's previous films: Cheng Siu-Keung served as a cinematographer; Stanley Cheung served as a costume designer; during post-production Martin Chappell served as a sound editor, while David Richardson served as the film's editor; Lo Tayu composed the film's score, having done the same for To's previous films, Election, All About Ah-Long and The Big Heat; Nicky Li, a member of the Jackie Chan Stunt Team served as an action choreographer.

=== Development ===
"Since a few years ago, I’ve had this hope to do movies with people outside of Hong Kong, because I feel this exchange is good for me. Also, I wanted to bring more people to Hong Kong to make movies. I think that’s very interesting. This project is from France so it gave me the opportunity to do what I wanted to do."
—Director Johnnie To on making Vengeance.

Having distributed several of To's films in France, Michèle Pétin and her husband Laurent discussed the idea of having To direct an English-language feature film. In March 2006, the Pétins met To in Sai Kung Town, Hong Kong, where they expressed their idea to him. The couple mentioned Alain Delon as a possibility for the lead role.

To returned to France in May 2006, while his film, Election 2, premiered "Out of Competition" at the 60th Cannes Film Festival. He met with Delon, who had expressed his interest in working with To, and To promised to meet with Delon once a film treatment was written. To returned to France in March 2007, where he handed the Pétins a step outline of what he and screenwriter Wai Ka-Fai had envisioned. Delon, however, was no longer interested in the project. In July 2007, the Pétins met with French musician and actor Johnny Hallyday, who was interested in making a new film. After meeting with Hallyday, who had expressed his love for world cinema, the Pétins decided that he would be perfect in the lead role.

"He's alone and lost in Hong Kong. I was just like him...It's impossible on your own because people in the street don't speak any English. I really felt out of the loop, like Costello in the film...For this movie, I made use of the present. Everything I was experiencing and feeling in Hong Kong went into my role."
—Johnny Hallyday comparing his first visit to Asia to that of his lead character Costello.

In February 2008, while promoting his previous film, Sparrow, at the Berlin International Film Festival, To was approached by the Pétins, who had promised him that they would set up a meeting with Hallyday. While Hallyday was a fan of his films, To had never heard of Hallyday. The producers gave To footage from Hallyday's concert performances along with a copy of the 2002 French film The Man on the Train, in which Hallyday co-starred. After viewing the given footage, To had expressed that he had enjoyed the film, but was more impressed with Hallyday's concert performances. In March 2008, To finally met with Hallyday over a dinner, expressing their love for music. Upon their first meeting, To decided that Hallyday would be perfect in the lead role.

Production plans were nearly put to a halt when To was hired to remake the 1970 French crime film Le Cercle rouge, meaning that Vengeance would not be made until 2010. However, in June and July 2008, Ding Yuin-Shan, a long-time production assistant and English translator for To, contacted Hallyday and the Pétins, and told them that production plans for the remake were falling behind schedule and that To would be ready to film Vengeance by the end of October 2008. Hallyday was ecstatic about meeting with the director once again, and prepared for his role by viewing several of To's previous films, before making his first visit to Hong Kong, where he would get the chance to meet with his co-stars. Before principal photography began, Hallyday met his co-stars, Anthony Wong, Lam Ka-Tung, Simon Yam, and Lam Suet, during a dinner on 7 November 2008.

=== Filming ===
With a budget of $11.5 million, principal photography for Vengeance took place in Hong Kong and Macau from 15 November 2008 to 31 January 2009. The cast and crew of the film began with a celebration on the rooftop of the Milkyway Image studio in Kwun Tong, Hong Kong. While the story is set in Macau, several scenes were shot in Hong Kong.

For To, filming Vengeance differed from his usual style of filmmaking. While he is used to improvising his scenes as a director, Vengeance marked the first time that To had to work with a complete shooting script since the producers demanded that the story and dialogue already be written. Hallyday was the only actor to have read the script, while Anthony Wong had knowledge of the story. To explained that his purpose was to "keep the actors natural and spontaneous. They don't have time to create something. They're given a situation and they act it right away." After filming was complete, the cast and crew celebrated by having a final dinner at a restaurant located near the Milkyway Image studio, hoping to meet again at the forthcoming Cannes Film Festival.

== Release ==
=== Theatrical run ===
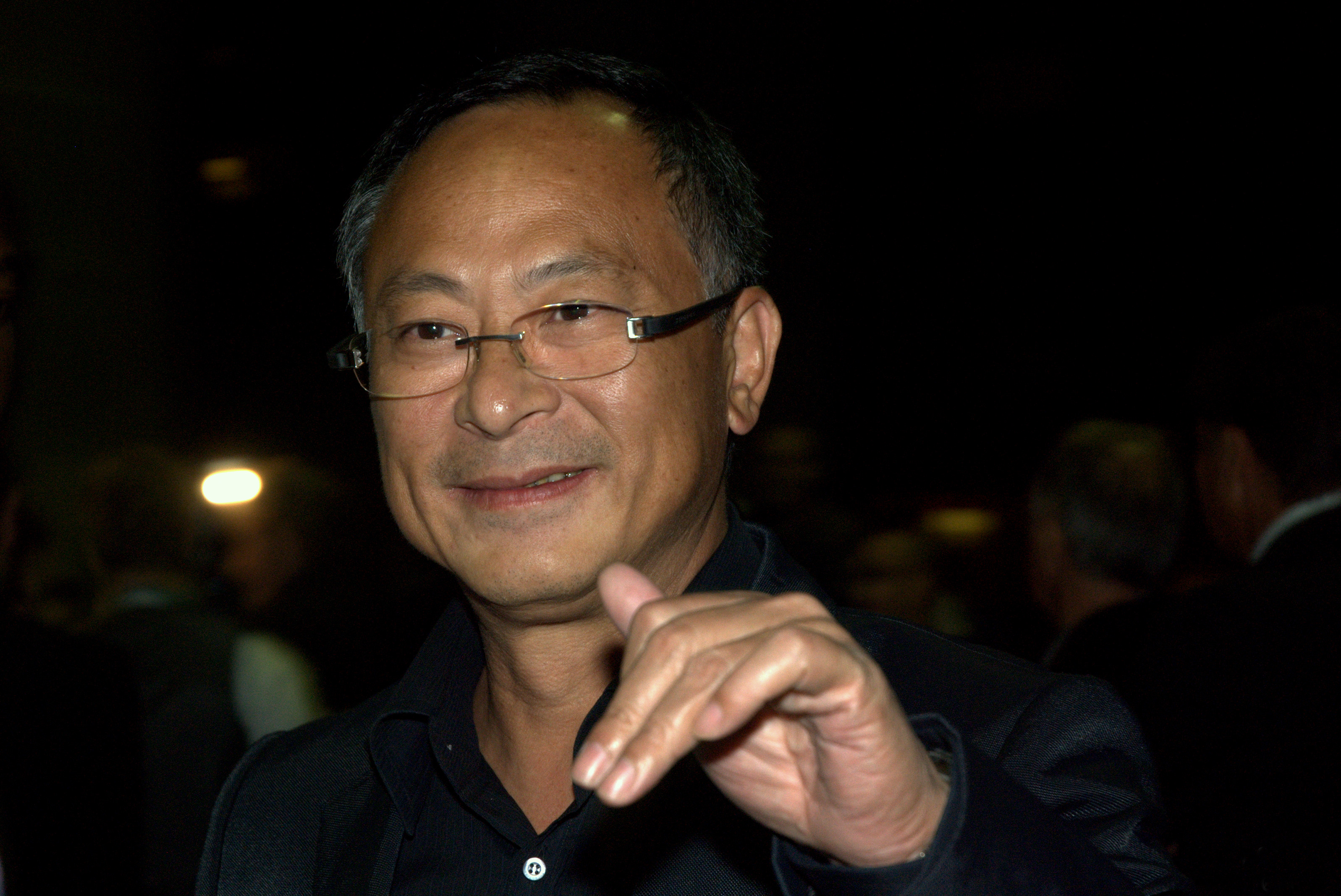
Director Johnnie To attending the premiere of Vengeance at the Ryerson Theatre during the 2009 Toronto International Film Festival.

Vengeance was first released in France on 20 May 2009. It was later released in Belgium on 27 May 2009. On 5 August 2009, the film premiered in Asia at the 2009 Hong Kong Summer International Film Festival. It was released theatrically in Hong Kong on 20 August 2009. Vengeance was also released in other Asian countries, including Malaysia on 27 August 2009; Taiwan on 31 October 2009; and Singapore on 5 November 2009.

=== Home media ===
Vengeance was released on DVD and Blu-ray Disc formats in France and Hong Kong on 11 December 2009. It is also available in VCD format in Hong Kong. Releases for the French version include a single-disc edition DVD; a two-disc special edition DVD; and a special edition Blu-ray Disc. In France, the home video formats, along with its special features, do not include English subtitles.

IFC Films currently serves as a North American distributor. In the United States, the film was released as a video on demand option on pay television formats, beginning on 4 August 2010.

== Reception ==
=== Critical response ===
Vengeance has received generally positive reviews from film critics. Based on 22 reviews, review aggregator Rotten Tomatoes reports that the film holds a 91% rating, with a rating average of 7.2 out of 10. On Metacritic, the film has a weighted average score of 76 out of 100 based on 5 reviews.

"The film's plot serves the fabled Hong Kong director Johnnie To as an excuse to devise uncanny and beautiful visual action set pieces. He's not much concerned with how we got into them and how we get out of him. Since his hero is losing his memory, he doesn't much care, either."
—Roger Ebert, writing for the Chicago Sun-Times

Vengeance first received praise from several critics who attended the screening at the 2009 Cannes Film Festival. Chicago Sun-Times film critic Roger Ebert wrote that the film had "certain parallels" with Clint Eastwood's 1992 film Unforgiven. In his initial review, Ebert awarded Vengeance 3½ stars out of four, describing it as "a formula thriller done as an elegant genre exercise." Justin Chang of Variety wrote that the film was "a smoothly executed revenge thriller." David Phelps, a film critic for The Auters concluded his review by writing, "If not one of To's worst films, Vengeance is one of his best." Manohla Dargis of The New York Times wrote that was film a "highlight" of Cannes, writing, "With his ruined face and pale snake eyes Mr. Hallyday holds the screen while Mr. To shakes it up." Kirk Honeycutt of The Hollywood Reporter praised the film's cinematography and editing: "Cheng Siu-Keung's moody cinematography gives Vengeance a noir-ish sensibility while David Richardson's smooth editing pulls the action sequences together in a most satisfying way." Mike Hale of The New York Times wrote, "Vengeance is not top-flight Johnnie To...But the To poetry keeps breaking through: a gun battle in a city park stops and starts as clouds pass before the moon."

Negative reviews had critics comparing Vengeance to To's previous films. Lee Marshall of Screen International wrote, "What's really lacking in Vengeance is the narrative inventiveness which lifted films like Breaking News or PTU out of the Hong Kong crime genre box and turned them into arthouse crossover items." Perry Lam of Muse Magazine wrote, "Overall, the movie lacks the flashes of life and brilliance that mark the best works in the genre."

=== Box office ===
In France, Vengeance was released to 280 theatres and in its first week, opened at eleventh place in the box office, grossing only US$539,809, and selling 63,240 tickets. The film's revenues decreased by 66.9% in its second weekend, moving down to fourteenth place and earning $178,459 at the box office. After only two weeks of release, Vengeance grossed a total of $744,881 in France alone.

Vengeance was released in Belgium seven days after its release in France. On the weekend of 27 May 2009 to 31 May, the film opened at 22nd place in the box office, earning $10,397 on the opening weekend, with a total gross of $11,439. The film dropped down to the 29th spot in the box office, grossing only $6,886 in its second week. At the end of its three weeks of theatrical release in Belgium, Vengeance grossed a total $27,377.

Vengeance was later released in Hong Kong, where it opened at sixth place, grossing $121,837 on its opening weekend. The film dropped down to tenth place in its second week, grossing $37,629 for a total gross of $208,976. During the next three weeks of its release, Vengeance continued a decrease in revenue as well as the number of theatres screening the film. The film dropped down to 21st spot on 3 to 6 September 2009 weekend, grossing only $1,951. By the end of its theatrical run in Hong Kong, the film grossed $236,027. In total, Vengeance has grossed $1,346,952 worldwide, despite not being released in other parts of Europe.

=== Accolades ===
Vengeance first competed for the prestigious Palme d'Or at the 62nd Cannes Film Festival. In North America, the film premiered as a "Special Presentations" feature at the Ryerson Theatre during the 2009 Toronto International Film Festival.

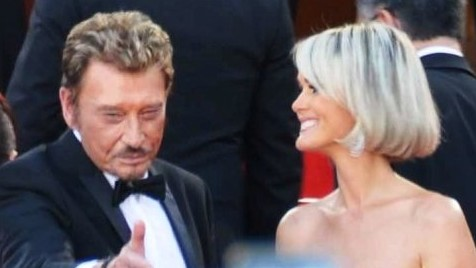
Johnny Hallyday with his wife Laeticia, promoting the film at the 2009 Cannes Film Festival.

Awards
Award	Category	Name	Result
29th Hong Kong Film Awards	Best Original Film Score	Lo Tayu	Nominated
4th Asian Film Awards	Best Composer	Lo Tayu	Won
4th Asian Film Awards	Best Cinematography	Cheng Siu-Keung	Nominated

== Remake ==
Israeli directors Nevot Papushdo and Aaron Kashels were hired by Sony Pictures to direct an American version of the film. The 2011 Telugu film Oosaravelli is unofficially based on this movie.

== See also ==
- Triad
