= Yau Nai-hoi =

Hong Kong screenwriter and director

- Born: 14 April 1968 (age 57); Hong Kong
- Years active: 1993 – present

Chinese name
Transcriptions
Standard Mandarin
- Hanyu Pinyin: Yóu Nǎi Hǎi
Yue: Cantonese
- Jyutping: Yau4 Naai5 Hoi2

Yau Nai-hoi (Chinese: 游乃海; Jyutping: jau4 naai5 hoi2) is a Hong Kong filmmaker. He is best known as a frequent screenwriter for films produced by the independent Hong Kong production company Milkyway Image, notably films directed by Johnnie To and Wai Ka-Fai. Yau often collaborates with fellow Milkyway Image writers Wai Ka-Fai, Szeto Kam-Yuen, Au Kin-Yee and Yip Tin-Shing. His directorial debut arrived with the 2007 film Eye in the Sky.

== Filmography ==
- Mad Fate (2023) (writer)
- Septet: The Story of Hong Kong (2020) (writer)
- Three (2016) (writer)
- Blind Detective (2013) (writer)
- Drug War (2012) (writer)
- Romancing in Thin Air (2012) (writer)
- Life Without Principle (2011) (writer)
- Don't Go Breaking My Heart (2011) (writer)
- Tactical Unit – Comrades in Arms (2009) (writer)
- Triangle (2007) (writer)
- Eye in the Sky (2007) (director) (writer)
- Election 2 (a.k.a. Triad Election) (2006) (writer)
- Election (2005) (writer)
- Throw Down (2004) (writer)
- Running on Karma (2003) (writer)
- Turn Left, Turn Right (2003) (writer)
- PTU (2003) (writer)
- Love for All Seasons (2003) (writer)
- My Left Eye Sees Ghosts (2002) (writer)
- Fat Choi Spirit (2002) (writer)
- Running Out of Time 2 (2001) (writer)
- Love on a Diet (2001) (writer)
- Wu yen (2001) (writer)
- Needing You... (2000) (writer)
- Help!!! (2000) (writer)
- The Mission (1999) (writer)
- Running Out of Time (1999) (writer)
- Where a Good Man Goes (1999) (writer)
- A Hero Never Dies (1998) (writer)
- Expect the Unexpected (1998) (writer)
- The Longest Nite (1998) (writer)
- Lifeline (1997) (writer)
- A Moment of Romance III (1996) (writer)
- Loving You (1995) (writer)
- The Bare-Footed Kid (1993) (writer)

== Awards ==
Year	Film	Awards and Nominations	Occasion
1999	The Longest Nite	Nominated: Best Screenplay Shared with Szeto Kam-Yuen	Hong Kong Film Awards
1999	Expect the Unexpected	Won: Best Screenplay Shared with Szeto Kam-Yuen and Chow Hin-Yan	Hong Kong Film Critics Society Awards
1999	Expect the Unexpected	Nominated: Best Screenplay Shared with Szeto Kam-Yuen and Chow Hin-Yan	Hong Kong Film Awards
2000	Running Out of Time	Won: Best Screenplay Shared with Laurent Courtiaud and Julien Carbon	Golden Bauhinia Awards
2000	Running Out of Time	Nominated: Best Screenplay Shared with Laurent Courtiaud and Julien Carbon	Hong Kong Film Awards
2000	Needing You...	Nominated: Best Screenplay Shared with Wai Ka-Fai	Hong Kong Film Awards
2003	PTU	Won: Best Screenplay Shared with Au Kin-Yee	Golden Horse Film Festival
2003	Turn Left, Turn Right	Nominated: Best Screenplay Shared with Wai Ka-Fai, Au Kin-Yee and Yip Tin-Shing	Golden Horse Film Festival
2004	PTU	Won: Best Screenplay Shared with Au Kin-Yee	Golden Bauhinia Awards
2004	Throw Down	Won: Best Screenplay Shared with Au Kin-Yee and Yip Tin-Shing	Golden Horse Film Festival
2004	Running on Karma	Won: Best Screenplay Shared with Wai Ka-Fai, Au Kin-Yee and Yip Tin-Shing	Hong Kong Film Awards
2004	Running on Karma	Won: Best Screenplay Shared with Wai Ka-Fai, Au Kin-Yee and Yip Tin-Shing	Hong Kong Film Critics Society Awards
2005	Election	Won: Best Screenplay Shared with Yip Tin-Shing	Golden Horse Film Festival
2006	Election	Won: Best Screenplay Shared with Yip Tin-Shing	Hong Kong Film Awards
2007	Election 2	Nominated: Best Screenplay Shared with Yip Tin-Shing	Hong Kong Film Awards
2008	Eye in the Sky	Nominated: Best Screenplay Shared with Au Kin-Yee	Hong Kong Film Awards
2008	Eye in the Sky	Won: Best New Director	Hong Kong Film Awards
2008	Eye in the Sky	Nominated: Best Director	Hong Kong Film Awards
2008	Eye in the Sky	Nominated: Best Screenplay Shared with Au Kin-Yee	Asian Film Awards
2025	Mad Fate	Won: Best Screenplay shared with Melvin Li	Hong Kong Film Awards
