= Yip Tin-shing =

Hong Kong screenwriter

- 葉天成
- Born: October 20, 1965 (age 60); Hong Kong
- Occupation: Screen writer

Yip Tin-shing
- Traditional Chinese: 葉天成
- Simplified Chinese: 叶天成
Transcriptions
Standard Mandarin
- Hanyu Pinyin: Yè Tiānchéng

Yip Tin-shing (Chinese: 葉天成; Jyutping: jip6 tin1 sing4; born 20 October 1965) is a Hong Kong screenwriter.

== Career ==
Yip is a long-time screenwriter for films directed by Johnnie To and/or Wai Ka-fai of Milkyway Image and frequently works alongside screenwriters Szeto Kam-yuen, Wai Ka-Fai, Yau Nai-hoi and Au Kin-yee.

== Filmography ==
=== Writer ===
- Bachelor Party (2012)
- Turning Point 2 (2011)
- Life Without Principle (2011)
- 72 Tenants of Prosperity (2010)
- Turning Point (2009)
- Newsmakers (2009)
- Tactical Unit - The Code (2008) (TV movie)
- Triangle (2007)
- Exiled (2006)
- Election 2 (a.k.a. Triad Election) (2006)
- Election (2005)
- Throw Down (2004)
- Breaking News (2004)
- Running on Karma (2003)
- Turn Left, Turn Right (2003)
- Love for All Seasons (2003)

== Awards and nominations ==
Year	Film	Award	Occasion
2004	Throw Down (2004)	Best Screenplay Shared with Au Kin-Yee and Yip Tin-Shing	Golden Horse Film Festival
2004	Running on Karma (2003)	Best Screenplay Shared with Wai Ka-Fai, Yau Nai-Hoi and Au Kin-Yee	Hong Kong Film Awards
2004	Running on Karma (2003)	Best Screenplay Shared with Wai Ka-Fai, Yau Nai-Hoi and Au Kin-Yee	Hong Kong Film Critics Society Awards
2005	Election (2005)	Best Screenplay Shared with Yau Nai-Hoi	Golden Horse Film Festival
2006	Election (2005)	Best Screenplay Shared with Yau Nai-Hoi	Hong Kong Film Awards
2007	Election 2 (2005)	Nominated: Best Screenplay Shared with Yau Nai-Hoi	Hong Kong Film Awards
