= Cheng Siu-keung =

Hong Kong cinematographer and screenwriter

- Born: July 21, 1952 (age 74); Hong Kong
- Other names: Milo Cheng; Alan Cheng
- Occupations: Cinematographer; Filmmaker

Chinese name
- Traditional Chinese: 鄭兆強
- Simplified Chinese: 郑兆强
- Hanyu Pinyin: Zhèng Zhàoqiáng

Cheng Siu-keung (simplified Chinese: 郑兆强; traditional Chinese: 鄭兆強, born July 21, 1952), also credited as Alan Cheng or Milo Cheng, is a Hong Kong cinematographer, screenwriter, and director. He is known for frequently collaborating with directors Johnnie To and Wai Ka-Fai as a cinematographer for their independent film production company, Milkyway Image.

== Filmography ==
=== As cinematographer ===
- Unfaithfully Yours (1989)
- Happy Together (1989)
- Middle Man (1990)
- The Figures from Earth (1990)
- A Bite of Love (1990)
- Fight Back to School (1991)
- Inspector Pink Dragon (1991)
- Hidden Desire (1991)
- What a Hero! (1992)
- Black Cat II (1992)
- Fight Back to School II (1992)
- Zen of Sword (1992)
- White Lotus Cult (1993)
- Murder (1993)
- Sam the Iron Bridge -- Champion of Martial Arts (1993)
- One Arm Hero (1994)
- Return to a Better Tomorrow (1994)
- Whatever You Want (1994)
- The Great Conqueror's Concubine (1994)
- Thunderbolt (1995)
- Loving You (1995)
- The Meaning of Life (1995)
- Teenage Master (1995)
- Beyond Hypothermia (1996)
- Satan Returns (1996)
- Intruder (1997)
- Lifeline (1997)
- The Odd One Dies (1997)
- A Hero Never Dies (1998)
- The Lucky Guy (1998)
- A True Mob Story (1998)
- The Longest Nite (1998)
- Tales in the Wind (1998)
- Where A Good Man Goes (1999)
- Running Out of Time (1999)
- The Mission (1999)
- Okinawa: Rendez-vous (2000)
- Twelve Nights (2000)
- Needing You... (2000)
- Help!!! (2000)
- Fulltime Killer (2001)
- Wu yen (2001)
- The Loser's Club (2001)
- Running Out of Time 2 (2001)
- Love On a Diet (2001)
- My Left Eye Sees Ghosts (2002)
- Fat Choi Spirit (2002)
- Love for All Seasons (2003)
- Running on Karma (2003)
- PTU (2003)
- Turn Left, Turn Right (2003)
- Breaking News (2004)
- Yesterday Once More (2004)
- Throw Down (2004)
- Dumplings (2004)
- Election (2005)
- Exiled (2006)
- Election 2 (2006)
- Mad Detective (2007)
- Triangle (2007)
- Linger (2008)
- Sparrow (2008)
- Vengeance (2009)
- Death of a Hostage (2010)
- Life Without Principle (2011)
- Don't Go Breaking My Heart (2011)
- Romancing in Thin Air (2012)
- Drug War (2012)
- Blind Detective (2013)
- The Way We Dance (2013)
- Doomsday Party (2013)
- Twilight Online (2014)
- Imprisoned: Survival Guide for Rich and Prodigal (2015)
- Office (2015)
- Get Outta Here (2015)
- Blood of Youth (2016)
- Three (2016)
- Keep Calm and Be a Superstar (2018)
- Monster Hunt 2 (2018)
- The Invincible Dragon (2019)
- Ip Man 4: The Finale (2019)
- Limbo (2021)
- A Murder Erased (2022)
- Detective vs Sleuths (2022)
- Cyber Heist (2023)
- Mad Fate (2023)

== Nominations ==
| Year | Film | Nominations | Occasion |
|---|---|---|---|
| 2009 | Sparrow (2008) | Achievement in Cinematography | Asia Pacific Screen Awards |
| 2008 | Mad Detective (2007) | Best Cinematography | Hong Kong Film Awards |
| 2007 | Exiled (2006) | Best Cinematography | Hong Kong Film Awards |
| 2006 | Election (2005) | Best Cinematography | Hong Kong Film Awards |
| 2005 | Election (2005) | Best Cinematography | Golden Horse Film Festival |
| 2004 | PTU (2003) | Best Cinematography | Hong Kong Film Awards |
| 2003 | PTU | Best Cinematography | Golden Horse Film Festival |
| 2002 | Running Out of Time 2 (2001) | Best Cinematography | Golden Horse Film Festival |
