= Martin Chappell =

- Born: unknown Nottingham, England
- Occupations: musician, sound editor

Chinese name
- Traditional Chinese: 卓保怡
- Simplified Chinese: 卓保怡
Transcriptions
Standard Mandarin
- Hanyu Pinyin: Zhuō1 Bǎo3 Yí2
Yue: Cantonese
- Jyutping: Cheuk1 Bou2 Yi4
- Musical career
- Also known as: Cheuk Biu-Yi
- Genres: Cinema of Hong Kong

Martin Richard Chappell (Chinese: 卓保怡), born in Nottingham, England is a musician-turned-Hong Kong sound editor. He is most notable for serving as a sound editor on Hong Kong films made by Johnnie To and his production company, Milkyway Image.

== Biography ==
Martin Chappell was born in Nottingham, England. Under the influence of his pianist grandfather, Martin Chappell decided to follow his interest in sound at early age - inspired by the works of Stockhaussen and Peter Murphy's Bauhaus.

Growing up in England, Chappell started as a bass guitarist and audio fan. After graduating from Manchester University with a degree in sound engineering, he moved to Australia and later moved to Hong Kong, where he got a job working in a radio station. After being hired briefly by major film studio MGM, Chappell found a job at Milkyway Image, where he made he first effort as a sound mixer for the 1996 film The Intruder.

Chappell has worked on over 60 Hong Kong films, collaborating with the likes of Ringo Lam, Johnnie To and Tsui Hark. Known to be fluent in Cantonese, his film credits include The Longest Nite, The Mission, Mad Detective, Running on Karma and Blood Brothers.

He made appearances on screen in a Hero Never Dies, where he is a customer of Fiona's and takes a boat rde with her. In the subtitles Lau Ching Wan's character is translated as 'Martin'. He also appeared in 'Running Out of Time'

Now appears to be working regularly with 'the Asylum' the LA based company started by David Rimawi and David Latt, with recent titles 'Titanic 666' 'Dracula the original living Vampire' amongst others.
