= Law Wing-cheung =

Hong Kong film editor

Law Wing-Cheong
- Born: June 26, 1966 (age 60); Hong Kong
- Occupations: Film director; actor; film editor; assistant director
- Awards: Golden Horse Awards – Best Film Editing; 2002 Running Out of Time 2 (shared with Yau Chi-Wai)

Chinese name
- Traditional Chinese: 羅永昌
- Simplified Chinese: 罗永昌
Transcriptions
Standard Mandarin
- Hanyu Pinyin: Luó2 Yǒng3 Chāng1
Yue: Cantonese
- Jyutping: Lo4 Wing5 Coeng1

Law Wing-Cheong (born 26 June 1966), also known as Vincent Lo, is a Hong Kong film editor, an assistant director, film director, and actor. He is best known for collaborating as an associate director for films made by Johnnie To and Wai Ka-Fai of Milkyway Image.

== Biography ==
Law began working for Johnnie To as an assistant director at TVB Studios in 1990. Later, when To left the TV studio, Law continued to work as a director there for three years. In 1997, Law was recruited by To to join his company, Milkyway Image, where he began to work as an assistant director for To. Gradually, Law was promoted to become his associate director.

Law describes being an associate director as having to think faster than the director, as well as handling some of the less complicated scenes for the director and making all kinds of job distributions on the set.

Law made his directorial debut with a segment in the horror omnibus Ghost Office, followed by the cat-and-mouse thriller Running Out of Time 2 which won him an award for Best Film Editing at The 39th Golden Horse Awards.

== Filmography ==
Year	Film	Chinese title	Role	Notes
1995	Fatal Assignment	共闖天涯	Assistant director	
1998	A Hero Never Dies	真心英雄	Assistant director	
1998	The Longest Nite	暗花	Assistant director	
1999	Where a Good Man Goes	再見阿郎	Assistant director Actor	
1999	Running Out of Time	暗戰	Assistant director	
1999	The Mission	鎗火	Assistant director Actor: "Curtis' Henchman"	
2000	Help!!!	辣手回春	Associate director Film editor	
2000	Needing You...	孤男寡女	Associate director Film editor	
2001	Fulltime Killer	全職殺手	Associate director	
2001	Love on a Diet	瘦身男女	Associate director	
2001	Running Out of Time 2	暗戰2	Director with Johnnie To; Film editor	
2001	Wu yen	鍾無艷	Associate director	
2002	Ghost Office	每天嚇你8小時	Director: "The Queen of Gossip"	Collaborating director
2002	My Left Eye Sees Ghosts	我左眼見到鬼	Associate director Film editor	
2002	Fat Choi Spirit	嚦咕嚦咕新年財	Associate director Film editor	
2003	PTU	PTU	Associate director Film editor	Also known as PTU: Police Tactical Unit
2003	Turn Left, Turn Right	向左走．向右走	Second unit director Film editor	
2003	Running on Karma	大隻佬	Associate director Film editor	Also known as An Intelligent Muscle Man (大只佬/大块头有大智慧)
2003	Love for All Seasons	百年好合	Associate director Film editor	Taxi Driver (uncredited)
2004	Throw Down	柔道龍虎榜	Associate director	
2004	Breaking News	大事件	Associate director	
2004	Yesterday Once More	龍鳳鬥	Associate director Film editor	
2004	Fantasia	鬼馬狂想曲	Executive director	
2005	Election	黑社會	Associate director	Four-Eyes (uncredited)
2005	The Unusual Youth	非常青春期	"Inspector Lam"	Cameo appearance
2006	2 Become 1	天生一對	Director; Film editor	
2006	Election 2	黑社會以和為貴	Associate director Film editor	Also known as Triad Election
2006	Exiled	放‧逐	Associate director	
2007	Hooked on You	每當變幻時	Director; Film editor	
2008	Sparrow	文雀	"Sak"	Actor
2008	Tactical Unit – The Code	機動部隊─警例	Director; Film editor	
2009	Tactical Unit – Comrades in Arms	機動部隊─衕袍	Director; Film editor	
2011	Punished	報應	Director	
2013	The Wrath of Vajra	金剛王：死亡救贖	Director	
2014	Iceman	冰封：重生之門	Director	
2014	Gangster Payday	大茶飯		Actor
2015	Two Thumbs Up	衝鋒車	Bowling Alley's Owner	Actor
TBA	King of Drug Dealers	跛豪	Director	

== Awards and nominations ==
Year	Film	Awards and Nominations	Occasion
2002	Running Out of Time 2 (2001)	Won: Best Editing Shared with Yau Chi-Wai	Golden Horse Film Festival
2003	PTU (2003)	Nominated: Best Editing	Golden Horse Film Festival
2004	Running on Karma (2003)	Nominated: Best Film Editing	23rd Hong Kong Film Awards
2004	PTU (2003)	Nominated: Best Film Editing	23rd Hong Kong Film Awards
2007	2 Become 1 (2006)	Nominated: Best New Director	26th Hong Kong Film Awards
