= David Richardson (editor) =

Hong Kong film editor

- Born: David M. Richardson; United Kingdom
- Occupation: Film editor
- Years active: 2000–present

David M. Richardson is a Hong Kong film editor. Known for his frequent collaborations with director Johnnie To and as a co-founder of To's Milkyway Image, Richardson has received 14 Hong Kong Film Award nominations, and won Best Editing twice for the Milkyway-produced Trivisa (2016) and Mad Fate (2023) in the 36th and 42nd Hong Kong Film Awards.

== Biography ==
Richardson was born in the United Kingdom. His father was also a film editor who began his apprenticeship in London in the 1940s. Richardson described film editing as his "family business" and often visited his father's studio to watch him work when he was a child. Richardson later moved to Vancouver, Canada, where he worked as a film editor in North America. He sent a demo reel to Hong Kong director Ringo Lam's production team for the film Replicant. Richardson said that he "wasn't that great a fan of Hong Kong cinema" and chose to join the project mainly because the film was being shot in Vancouver. Lam subsequently brought him on board, marking the beginning of Richardson's film-editing career in Hong Kong cinema.

Richardson worked with Johnnie To on the 2001 film Fulltime Killer. During production, To and his partner Wai Ka-fai were simultaneously shooting Love on a Diet, and because Richardson completed the editing without requiring To's intervention, To was "happy" with his work, beginning a long-term collaboration between the two. Richardson later co-founded Milkyway Image with To and Wai, and became the company's chief editor. He collaborated with To on films including Breaking News, Throw Down, Yesterday Once More, Exiled, Linger, and Sparrow and also worked on the Milkyway productions Eye in the Sky and Triangle. He won the Golden Horse Award for Best Film Editing for Breaking News and the Asian Film Award for Best Editor for Eye in the Sky. He later worked on the Disney-produced film Trail of the Panda, about pandas in Sichuan. The production was affected by the 2008 Sichuan earthquake and Richardson was brought on board to provide "a different way to edit". He also served as a co-producer on Paul McGuigan's American film Push, which was shot in Hong Kong.

Richardson continued collaborating with To on Vengeance, Don't Go Breaking My Heart, Life Without Principle, Romancing in Thin Air, Drug War, and Blind Detective, as well as on the Milkyway productions Accident and Motorway. In 2013, he worked on Juno Mak's horror film Rigor Mortis, followed by editing and sound design work on To's 2015 film Office, for which he received nominations for the Golden Horse Award for Best Sound Effects and the Hong Kong Film Award for Best Sound Design. He later won both the Golden Horse Award and the Hong Kong Film Award for the Milkyway-produced film Trivisa. He continued to work on Milkyway productions including Three, Septet: The Story of Hong Kong, Limbo, and Mad Fate, winning another Hong Kong Film Award for Best Editing for Mad Fate.

== Filmography ==
=== As editor ===
| Year | Title | Notes |
|---|---|---|
| 2000 | Sanctimony | |
| 2001 | Replicant | |
| 2001 | Fulltime Killer | |
| 2001 | Blackwoods | |
| 2002 | Heart of America | |
| 2002 | Try Seventeen | |
| 2003 | House of the Dead | |
| 2004 | Breaking News | |
| 2004 | Throw Down | |
| 2004 | Yesterday Once More | |
| 2005 | BloodRayne | |
| 2006 | Exiled | |
| 2007 | Eye in the Sky | |
| 2007 | In the Name of the King | |
| 2007 | Triangle | |
| 2008 | Linger | |
| 2008 | Sparrow | |
| 2008 | Trail of the Panda | |
| 2009 | Vengeance | |
| 2009 | Accident | |
| 2010 | Frankie & Alice | |
| 2010 | Battle of the Bulbs | |
| 2011 | Don't Go Breaking My Heart | |
| 2011 | Life Without Principle | |
| 2012 | Romancing in Thin Air | |
| 2012 | Motorway | |
| 2012 | Drug War | |
| 2013 | Blind Detective | |
| 2013 | Rigor Mortis | |
| 2014 | Iceman | |
| 2014 | Don't Go Breaking My Heart 2 | |
| 2015 | SPL II: A Time for Consequences | |
| 2015 | Wild City | |
| 2015 | Office | |
| 2016 | Trivisa | |
| 2016 | Three | |
| 2016 | Operation Mekong | |
| 2016 | Sky on Fire | |
| 2019 | Little Q | |
| 2019 | Wings Over Everest | |
| 2020 | Septet: The Story of Hong Kong | |
| 2021 | Limbo | |
| 2021 | Anita | |
| 2022 | Detective vs Sleuths | |
| 2023 | Mad Fate | |
| 2026 | Cold War 1994 | |

=== As co-producer ===
| Year | Title | Notes |
|---|---|---|
| 2009 | Push | |

== Awards and nominations ==
| Year | Award | Category | Work | Result | Ref. |
|---|---|---|---|---|---|
| 2002 | 21st Hong Kong Film Awards | Best Editing | Fulltime Killer | Nominated | |
| 2004 | 41st Golden Horse Awards | Best Film Editing | Breaking News | Won | |
| 2005 | 24th Hong Kong Film Awards | Best Editing | Breaking News | Nominated | |
| 2006 | 43rd Golden Horse Awards | Best Film Editing | Exiled | Nominated | |
| 2007 | 26th Hong Kong Film Awards | Best Editing | Exiled | Nominated | |
| 2007 | 44th Golden Horse Awards | Best Film Editing | Eye in the Sky | Nominated | |
| 2008 | 2nd Asian Film Awards | Best Editor | Eye in the Sky | Won | |
| 2008 | 27th Hong Kong Film Awards | Best Editing | Eye in the Sky | Nominated | |
| 2009 | 28th Hong Kong Film Awards | Best Editing | Sparrow | Nominated | |
| 2010 | 29th Hong Kong Film Awards | Best Editing | Accident | Nominated | |
| 2012 | 31st Hong Kong Film Awards | Best Editing | Life Without Principle | Nominated | |
| 2012 | 49th Golden Horse Awards | Best Film Editing | Life Without Principle | Nominated | |
| 2013 | 32nd Hong Kong Film Awards | Best Editing | Motorway | Nominated | |
| 2013 | 50th Golden Horse Awards | Best Film Editing | Drug War | Nominated | |
| 2013 | 7th Asian Film Awards | Best Editor | Drug War | Nominated | |
| 2014 | 8th Asian Film Awards | Best Editor | Rigor Mortis | Nominated | |
| 2015 | 52nd Golden Horse Awards | Best Sound Effects | Office | Nominated | |
| 2016 | 35th Hong Kong Film Awards | Best Sound Design | Office | Nominated | |
| 2016 | 35th Hong Kong Film Awards | Best Editing | SPL II: A Time for Consequences | Nominated | |
| 2016 | 53rd Golden Horse Awards | Best Film Editing | Trivisa | Won | |
| 2017 | 36th Hong Kong Film Awards | Best Editing | Trivisa | Won | |
| 2017 | 36th Hong Kong Film Awards | Best Editing | Operation Mekong | Nominated | |
| 2022 | 40th Hong Kong Film Awards | Best Editing | Limbo | Nominated | |
| 2022 | 59th Golden Horse Awards | Best Film Editing | Limbo | Nominated | |
| 2023 | 41st Hong Kong Film Awards | Best Editing | Detective vs Sleuths | Nominated | |
| 2024 | 42nd Hong Kong Film Awards | Best Editing | Mad Fate | Won | |
