= Kelly Lin =

Taiwanese actress and model

- 林熙蕾
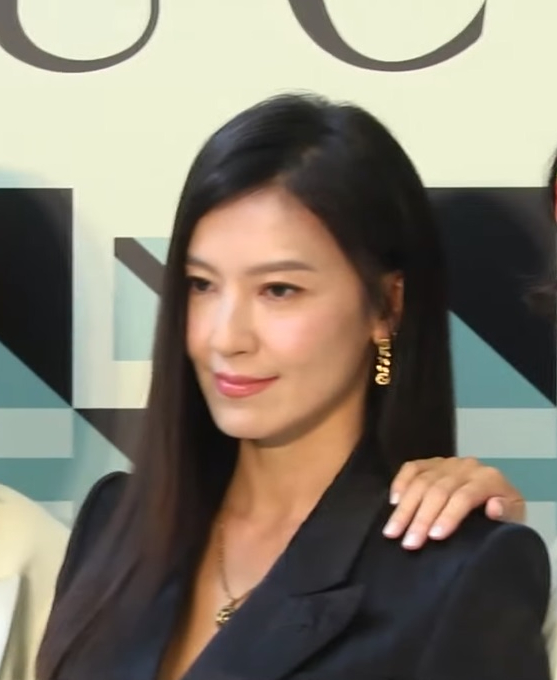
- Lin in 2022
- Born: 29 October 1973 (age 53); Taipei, Taiwan
- Education: University of California, Irvine (BA)
- Occupations: Actress; model

Chinese name
Transcriptions
Standard Mandarin
- Hanyu Pinyin: Lín Xīlěi
Yue: Cantonese
- Jyutping: Lam Hei-lui
- Musical career
- Also known as: Lam Hei-Lui; Lin Xilei; Kelly Lam
- Genre: Cinema of Hong Kong

Kelly Lin or Lin Hsi-Lei (born October 29, 1973) (Chinese: 林熙蕾; pinyin: Lín Xīlěi) is a Taiwanese actress and model who has appeared mainly in Hong Kong films.

== Biography ==
Lin was born in Taiwan in 1973. She moved to Santa Barbara, California, with her family at the age of 12. She graduated from the University of California, Irvine, with a degree in economics. Not knowing what to do after college, Lin decided to pursue a career in show business in Taiwan.

=== Career ===
Lin initially wanted to be a singer and recorded demo tapes for a record company, but she was given numerous offers for modeling on television and print ads. Hailed by FHM as "Asia's Sexiest Woman" in 2002, she modelled for the covers of numerous fashion magazines in Hong Kong, Taiwan, and China. She has also appeared on copies of Marie Claire – French Edition (2005) and VOGUE Italia (2007).

Lin has been seen in various Hong Kong films and has worked with film directors such as Tsui Hark, Patrick Tam and, most frequently, Johnnie To. Lin has co-starred alongside Asian superstars, including Andy Lau, Stephen Chow and Ekin Cheng. With her success as an actress, she decided to drop her hopes of becoming a singer.

After a two-year hiatus from the film industry, Lin returned to acting with films such as Tokyo Trial and After This Our Exile for which she was nominated for Best Supporting Actress at the 2006 Hong Kong Film Awards.

In 2006, she worked with award-winning French director, Olivier Assayas, and shared film credits with Italian-born Hollywood actress, Asia Argento, in the film, Boarding Gate, which aired at the Midnight Screening of the 2007 Cannes Film Festival. She also co-starred in the three-part-segment film, Triangle, which was also shown at the festival, and in Mad Detective, which was a runner-up and a "surprise film" at the 64th Venice International Film Festival 2007.

Sparrow, directed by Johnnie To, which took three years to make, was nominated for the "Golden Bear" at the Berlin International Film Festival 2008. Lin seems to have wisely chosen her movie projects, making herself be involved in art films, and giving her opportunities to travel around the world attending various film festivals. She gained the reputation of "Film Festival Queen" in Chinese entertainment.

In 2008, Lin became the first artist to be signed with Stellar Entertainment Ltd., owned and managed by Michelle Yeoh and international film producer Terence Chang. The new company aims to launch Asian artists to international stardom. She is one of the celebrity prime movers of BVLGARI "Rewrite The Future-Save The Children" campaign, alongside global celebrities like Isabella Rosellini, Lena Headey, Mischa Barton, Willem Dafoe and many others. Lin is also a staunch supporter of adopting stray puppies / dogs in Taiwan.

Lin later starred in Wai Ka Fai's "Written By", alongside award-winning actor Sean Lau once again. The film opened the 2009 New York Asian Film Festival and was released in Hong Kong on 10 July 2009. Lin entered the dark comedy genre by starring in tKing Ge You's film called "Gasp", which also stars Hollywood actor John Savage. It was released in Mainland cinemas in August 2009; Dirt Rich in Shanghai was released in October 2009. In this romantic comedy film involving Peter Lee, John Woo, Michelle Yeoh, and Terence Chang, her screen partner is Sun Honglei.

After making two comedy movies in a row, Kelly Lin appeared in the Wuxia movie Reign of Assassins with Michelle Yeoh and acclaimed Korean actor Jung Woo Sung. Production began in 2009, with the film released in 2010.

=== Personal life ===
On 28 March 2011, Lin married Chinese-American businessman Chris Young in a low-key beach wedding in the Maldives. On 31 August, she gave birth to their daughter Kaitlin. On 26 February 2014, Lin gave birth to her second daughter Mila.

== Filmography ==
- The Conmen in Vegas (1999)
- The Tricky Master (1999)
- The Legend of Speed (1999)
- Raped by an Angel 5 (2000)
- For Bad Boys Only (2000)
- Martial Angels (2001)
- Fulltime Killer (2001)
- The Legend of Zu (2001)
- Running Out of Time 2 (2001)
- Devil Face, Angel Heart (2002)
- The Irresistible Piggies (2002)
- Sleeping with the Dead (2002)
- My Left Eye Sees Ghosts (2002)
- The Tokyo Trial (2006)
- After This Our Exile (2006)
- Triangle (2007)
- Boarding Gate (2007)
- Mad Detective (2007)
- Sparrow (2008)
- Written By (2009) (Opening Film To New York Asian Film Festival 2009)
- Gasp (2009)
- My Fair Gentleman (2009)
- Reign of Assassins (2010)
- Just Call Me Nobody (2010)

== Television ==
- Astrology Stories: A Documentary On Kelly Lin(1999)
- Xin Shao Lin Wu Zu (2000)
- Shuangfei MV (2000)
- Xiang Shuai Chuan Qi (2001)
- Hong Yan Hua (2001)
- Huan Xi Ren Jia (2001)
- Existence of Love MV (2001)
- The New Adventures of Chor Lau-heung (2001)
- Honour and Unforgiven (2002)
- The Seventh Grade (2003)
- Asian Charlie's Angels (2004)
- Beautiful Girls (2005)
- Atheism MV (2006)

== Bibliography ==
- Offbeat (1999)

== Awards ==
- Best Actress Nominee- 2008 Berlin Film Festival (Germany) Sparrow
- Best Actress Nominee – 2007 Venice Film Festival (Italy) Mad Detective
- Best Actress Nominee – The 29th Hundred Flowers Film Awards (2008) The Tokyo Trial
- Best Supporting Actress Nominee- 26TH Hong Kong Film Awards After This Our Exile
- Best Supporting Actress Nominee −2006 HongKong Bauhulian Awards After This Our Exile
- ELLE Magazine's Most Fashionable Chinese Actress (2006)
- FHM's Sexiest Asian Woman (2002)

== Endorsements ==
- CHINFEI skin care products (2010)
- Rado watches (2010)
- Chanel Handbags (2009)
- Loewe (2009)
- Parfums Christian Dior (2009)
- Bvlgari-Rewrite The Future, "Save The Children" Campaign (2009)
- Bvlgari (2008)
- Chaumet Jewelries (2008)
- Burberry-Taiwan (2008)
- Gucci (2008)
- Chanel No5 (Taiwan) (2008)
- Paul & Shark '08 (2008)
- Estee Lauder (2008)
- agnes b. (2008)
- PC Ladies Brassiere & Lingerie (2008)
- Celine (2008)
- Louis Vuitton (2004–2008)
- Adidas (2007–present)
- Motorola (2006–present)
- Cindy Chao Jewelries (2004–present)
- Jaeger-LeCoultre (2007–2008)
- Emporio Armani (2007)
- Versace (2007)
- Laneige Cosmetics (2007)
- Cartidea (2007)
- ESPRIT (2007)
- Omega Jewelries (2006)
- Raymond Weil Geneve Watch (2006)
- Cartier (2005)
- Lancôme (2005)
- Pantene Shampoo (2003)
- Ponpon (2002)
- Neutrogena Facial Cleanser (2002)
- LAUREL Foods – Cairu Wanton (2000)
- Taiwan Mobile TV Ad (1999)
