= Eye in the Sky (2007 film) =

2007 Hong Kong film by Yau Nai-hoi

- Film poster
- Directed by: Yau Nai-hoi
- Written by: Yau Nai-hoi; Au Kin-yee
- Produced by: Johnnie To; Tsui Siu-Ming
- Starring: Simon Yam; Tony Leung Ka-fai; Kate Tsui
- Cinematography: Tony Cheung
- Edited by: David Richardson
- Music by: Guy Zerafa; Dave Klotz
- Production companies: Sundream Motion Pictures; Milkyway Image
- Distributed by: Edko Films
- Release date: 21 June 2007 (Hong Kong)
- Running time: 90 minutes
- Country: Hong Kong
- Languages: Cantonese; English
- Box office: US$1,792,872

Eye in the Sky (traditional Chinese: 跟蹤; simplified Chinese: 跟踪; lit. 'Tracing') is a 2007 Hong Kong action thriller film starring Simon Yam, Tony Leung Ka-fai and Miss Hong Kong pageant winner Kate Tsui in her film debut. Yam and Tsui play surveillance operatives on the trail of a gang of professional robbers led by Chan Chong-Shan (Leung). The title is derived from the casino surveillance tech "eye in the sky". It marks the directorial debut of Yau Nai-hoi, a long-time screenwriter for films directed by Johnnie To, who co-produced the film with his production company Milkyway Image. Eye in the Sky premiered as an Official Selection at the 2007 Berlin International Film Festival, and as an Opening Film at the Hong Kong International Film Festival. It was released by Edko Films in Hong Kong on 21 June 2007.

== Plot ==
Eye in the Sky begins with a group of organised burglars successfully robbing a jewelry store. Wet-behind-the-ears new recruit Piggy (Kate Tsui) is plunged at the deep end in her first surveillance assignment working alongside her mentor, Sergeant Wong (Simon Yam). They work for the Hong Kong Police Force's Criminal Intelligence Bureau. After reviewing the jewelry store surveillance videos recordings, the force attempts to track down one of the robbers by staking out the neighborhood they think he lives in.

Fatman (Lam Suet) is identified and tracked without his knowledge through a combination of tails, surveillance footage, and data-mining, including accessing his Octopus card. The force ambush is established at the scene of the next robbery, but the elusive Hollow Man (Tony Leung Ka-fai) notices the police. As the robbers flee, some are killed by a Police Tactical Unit, but the rest escape. Chan kills a uniformed police officer as he flees, and Piggy stops to give first aid rather than continue the pursuit.

The surveillance unit is then called to another case; a kidnapping. Piggy is staking out a phone booth where the kidnapper may make a call, when she sees Hollow Man go by. She recognises the kidnapper from Fatman's apartment building and allows the police to rescue the kidnap victim, while she pursues Hollow Man. After a tense confrontation in a cafe, where Hollow Man confronts her, she escapes suspicion, but Hollow Man notices Sergeant Wong and stabs him in the neck with a pair of scissors. Wong convinces Piggy to continue to follow Hollow Man as he slowly bleeds to death.

Piggy follows Hollow Man to his hideout and calls for the Police Tactical Unit again. Meanwhile, Wong survives his injury and gets medical attention. In the raid on the hideout, Hollow Man flees down a dock and wounds himself mortally in the neck running past a hanging hook, and the other robbers are captured.

== Cast ==
- Simon Yam as Sergeant Wong Man-chin ('Dog Head')
- Tony Leung Ka-fai as Chan Chong-shan ('Hollow Man')
- Kate Tsui as Constable Ho Ka-po ('Piggy'/'Bobo')
- Lam Suet as Ng Tung ('Fatman')
- Maggie Shiu as Madam
- Cheung Siu-fai as Chief Inspector Chan
- Berg Ng as burglar
- Wayne Lai as burglar

== Reception ==
The film received generally favourable reception and was hailed for the plot's authentic and dark atmosphere, and realistic use of surveillance tech to make the story believable. One criticism was that the film was too short and therefore not enough for those looking for something more.

Perry Lam of Muse magazine writes, 'If the ending of the movie is more than a little contrived and predictable, there are enough surprises along the way for us to savor before we get there.'

=== Festivals and awards ===
Eye in the Sky premiered as an Official Selection at The 2007 Berlin Film Festival and as an Opening Film at The Hong Kong International Film Festival.

== Awards and nominations ==
Awards and nominations
Ceremony	Category	Recipient	Outcome
27th Hong Kong Film Awards	Best Film	Eye in the Sky	Nominated
27th Hong Kong Film Awards	Best Director	Yau Nai-hoi	Nominated
27th Hong Kong Film Awards	Best Screenplay	Yau Nai-hoi, Au Kin-yee	Nominated
27th Hong Kong Film Awards	Best Actor	Simon Yam	Nominated
27th Hong Kong Film Awards	Best Supporting Actress	Maggie Shiu	Nominated
27th Hong Kong Film Awards	Best New Performer	Kate Tsui	Won
27th Hong Kong Film Awards	Best New Director	Yau Nai-hoi	Won
27th Hong Kong Film Awards	Best Film Editing	David M. Richardson	Nominated
2nd Asian Film Awards	Best Film Editing	David M. Richardson	Nominated
Golden Horse Film Awards	Best Director	Yau Nai-hoi	Nominated
Golden Horse Film Awards	Best Supporting Actress	Maggie Shiu	Nominated
Golden Horse Film Awards	Best Original Film Score	Guy Zerafa	Nominated
Golden Horse Film Awards	Best Film Editing	David M. Richardson	Nominated
14th Hong Kong Film Critics Society Awards	Best Actor	Tony Leung Ka-fai	Won
14th Hong Kong Film Critics Society Awards	Film of Merit	Eye in the Sky	Won

== Remake ==
A South Korean remake titled Cold Eyes starring Sul Kyung-gu, Jung Woo-sung and Han Hyo-joo was released in 2013.

Another remake, The Shadow's Edge, featuring Jackie Chan and Tony Leung Ka-fai (who was also the original), was released in 2025.

== See also ==
- List of films featuring surveillance
- Johnnie To filmography
