= Written By =

2009 Hong Kong film by Wai Ka-fai

- Film poster
- Directed by: Wai Ka-Fai
- Written by: Wai Ka-Fai; Au Kin-Yee
- Produced by: Wai Ka-Fai
- Starring: Lau Ching-Wan; Kelly Lin; Mia Yam
- Cinematography: Wong Wing-Hung
- Edited by: Tina Baz
- Music by: Xavier Jamaux
- Production company: Creative Formula Ltd.
- Distributed by: China Star Entertainment Group
- Release date: 10 July 2009
- Running time: 85 minutes
- Country: Hong Kong
- Language: Cantonese

Written By (traditional Chinese: 再生號; simplified Chinese: 再生号) is a 2009 Hong Kong fantasy drama film co-written, produced, and directed by Wai Ka-Fai, and starring Lau Ching-Wan and Kelly Lin. Lau plays a lawyer who is killed in an accident, leaving behind his wife, daughter, and son. He is resurrected as a character in his daughter's novel, where he finds himself a grieving husband who lost his family and his sight during a car accident, living in an alternate reality. The film premiered at the New York Asian Film Festival in June 2009, and was released theatrically in Hong Kong on 10 July 2009.

== Plot ==
"Lau Ching-Wan plays a lawyer who dies in a car wreck just before answering his daughters question about ghosts, leaving behind his wife, daughter and son. To console herself, his daughter (blind from the crash) writes a novel where she, her mother and brother have died in a car wreck but her father(but blind) has survived. To her surprise, the character of her father in her book decides that HE needs to write a novel to console himself and in his novel he has died but his wife and daughter have lived...and on and on in an endlessly recursive loop, as wounded characters desperately apply fiction to try and dull the sharp edges of their grief."

== Cast ==
- Lau Ching-Wan as Tony
- Kelly Lin as Mandy
- Mia Yam as Melody
- Yeung Shuk Man as Maid
- Bonnie Wong as a Ghost Whisperer
- Jo Kuk as Meng Por

== Production ==
To prepare for his role as a blind man, Lau Ching-Wan studied braille, a method that is widely used by blind people to read and write. He joked that now with his eyes open he did not understand a single word in braille, but when he closed his eyes to touch it he could read it smoothly. Even after filming, Lau still felt attached to his character, and often engaged in mood swings.

== Release ==
Written By made its world premiere as an "Opening film" at the New York Asian Film Festival in June 2009. The film was later released theatrically in Hong Kong on 10 July 2009. Director Wai Ka-Fai attended the premiere. Lau Ching-Wan was originally set appear at the festival, but decided to stay in Hong Kong due to the 2009 flu pandemic.

== Awards and nominations ==
16th Hong Kong Film Critics Society Award

- Won: Best Screenplay (Wai Ka Fai and Au Kin Yee)
- Film of Merit

4th Asian Film Awards

- Nominated: Best Screenwriter (Wai Ka Fai and Au Kin Yee)

29th Hong Kong Film Awards

- Nominated: Best Screenplay (Wai Ka Fai and Au Kin Yee)
- Nominated: Best Visual Effects (Teddy Mak Tak Man, Ken Law Wai Ho and Mary Ng Sze Sze)
