= My Left Eye Sees Ghosts =

2002 Hong Kong film by Johnnie To and Wai Ka-Fai

- DVD cover

Chinese name
- Traditional Chinese: 我左眼見到鬼
- Simplified Chinese: 我左眼见到鬼
Transcriptions
- Directed by: Johnnie To; Wai Ka-Fai
- Written by: Wai Ka-Fai; Yau Nai-Hoi; Au Kin-Yee
- Produced by: Johnnie To; Wai Ka-Fai
- Starring: Sammi Cheng; Sean Lau
- Cinematography: Cheng Siu-Keung
- Edited by: Law Wing-Cheong; Yau Chi-Wai
- Music by: Cacine Wong
- Production companies: One Hundred Years of Film; Milkyway Image
- Distributed by: China Star Entertainment Group
- Release date: 13 July 2002
- Running time: 97 minutes
- Country: Hong Kong
- Language: Cantonese

My Left Eye Sees Ghosts (traditional Chinese: 我左眼見到鬼; simplified Chinese: 我左眼见到鬼) is a 2002 Hong Kong film produced and directed by Johnnie To and Wai Ka-Fai, and starring Sammi Cheng, Lau Ching-Wan, Lee San-San, and Cherrie Ying. The film includes elements of tongue-in-cheek horror, comedy, romance and drama, and does not fit neatly into any one genre.

== Plot ==
May Ho (Sammi Cheng) is a woman who inherits a vast fortune when her rich husband drowns in a scuba diving accident in the Caribbean. May told several joking lies to win her Stanford-educated, extremely successful husband, and his mother and sister are less than pleased when they find out, especially since they still harbor suspicions about her motives in marrying her husband after knowing him for only seven days. Nonetheless, the house, fortune, and a portion of the family fashion company are hers. Depressed, alone, and deeply missing her husband (feelings further exacerbated when her husband's dog, Whisky, dies), May goes on a binge of eating, drinking, smoking, watching television, and stealing from her own company's stores, culminating in a drunken car ride and near-fatal car accident.

May finds herself lying on the ground outside her car and thinks she is unscathed, until she approaches her vehicle and sees her bloody body in the driver's seat. Ken Wong (Lau Ching Wan) appears to her and scares her into returning to her body, reviving herself.

Although she just barely evaded death, the left side of May's face is heavily injured. Later in the hospital, when she removes the gauze covering her left eye, she suddenly realizes she can see ghosts with that eye. She soon finds herself in the constant company and care of the ghost Ken, who claims that he is her former classmate who died when he was 13 in a typhoon out at sea. Throughout their escapades in the realm of the supernatural, May slowly develops a connection with him. However, despite all the ghosts she has encountered, her husband has never appeared to her and she deeply wants to see him, even for just an instant. Ken attempts to help her fulfill this wish before he crosses the Twilight Junction to be reincarnated though it initially appears she did not succeed. Only the spirit of her husband's late dog, Whisky, appears - seemingly close to Ken as if the canine knows him. Ken ask May for a final wish to hug her before he moves on, and in doing so she had to pretend that he was her husband.

Later, she goes to check on the restoration of her husband's vintage car and discovers the restorer resembles Ken, who turned to be the real Ken who did not really die when he was 13. She finally realize that the ghost who had been at her side all the while was actually her dead husband in disguise to prevent her from becoming too attached to him and to urge her to move on. She tries several ways to contact him after he had moved on, but all attempts were useless. Her ability to see ghosts had also disappeared. The film ends with a hint of a future romance between May and Ken.

== Cast ==
- Sammi Cheng - May Ho
- Lau Ching Wan - Ken Wong/Sam Wong
- Lam Tsz-sin - May's brother
- Lam Suet - May's dad
- Lee San-san- Susan
- Li Fung - Exorcist
- Kelly Lin - Phantom of Sam's girlfriend
- Szema Wah Lung - Ghost
- Wong Tin-lam - Sam's dad
- Bonnie Wong - Mrs. Tsui
- Simon Yam - Ben
- Cherrie Ying - Tina
