= A Hero Never Dies =

1998 Hong Kong film by Johnnie To

- Film poster
- Directed by: Johnnie To
- Written by: Szeto Kam-yuen; Yau Nai-hoi; Milkyway Creative Team
- Produced by: Johnnie To; Wai Ka-fai
- Starring: Leon Lai; Lau Ching-wan
- Cinematography: Cheng Siu-Keung
- Edited by: Chan Chi-wai
- Music by: Raymond Wong
- Production companies: Milkyway Image; Film City Co. Ltd.
- Release date: 30 September 1998
- Running time: 98 minutes
- Country: Hong Kong
- Language: Cantonese
- Box office: HK$6,360,165

A Hero Never Dies (Chinese: 真心英雄; pinyin: Zhen xin ying xiong; Cantonese Yale: Chan sam ying hung; literal title: True Heart Hero) is a 1998 Hong Kong action crime drama, and the first Milkyway Image film to be directed by Johnnie To.

Starring Leon Lai and Lau Ching-wan, A Hero Never Dies is a heroic bloodshed tale centering on the friendship and rivalry of two men in competing Triads in the midst of a gang war. The film has often been compared to the 1986 Hong Kong film A Better Tomorrow as both films involve characters who wind up being betrayed by their bosses.

== Cast and roles ==
- Leon Lai as Jack
- Lau Ching-wan as Martin
- Fiona Leung as Fiona, Martin's girlfriend
- Yoyo Mung as Yoyo, Jack's girlfriend
- Henry Fong as Mr. Fong
- Yen Shi-Kwan as Boss Yam
- Keiji Sato as Killer
- Michael Lam as Bodyguard
- Yuen Bun
- Cheung Chi-ping
- Lam Suet
- Chiu Chi-shing
- Law Ching-ting
- Wong Tin-lam as Wong
- Law Wing-cheung
- Philip Keung
