= Au Kin-yee =

Hong Kong screenwriter

- Occupations: Screenwriter, script supervisor
- Awards: Hong Kong Film Awards – Best Screenplay; 2003 Running on Karma (Shared with Wai Ka-Fai, Yau Nai-Hoi and Yip Tin-Shing); Best Screenplay; 2008 Mad Detective (Shared with Wai Ka-Fai) Golden Bauhinia Awards – Best Screenplay; 2003 PTU (Shared with Yau Nai-Hoi) Hong Kong Film Critics Society Awards – Best Screenplay; 2004 Running on Karma (Shared with Wai Ka-Fai, Yau Nai-Hoi and Yip Tin-Shing) Golden Horse Awards – Best Screenplay; 2003 PTU (Shared with Yau Nai-Hoi); Best Screenplay; 2003 Turn Left, Turn Right (Shared with Wai Ka-Fai, Yau Nai-Hoi and Yip Tin-Shing); Best Screenplay; 2004 Throw Down (Shared with Yau Nai-Hoi and Yip Tin-Shing)

Chinese name
- Traditional Chinese: 歐健兒
- Simplified Chinese: 欧健儿
- Hanyu Pinyin: Ōu Jiàn Ér
- Jyutping: Au1 Gin6 Ji4

Au Kin-yee (simplified Chinese: 欧健儿; traditional Chinese: 歐健兒) is a Hong Kong screenwriter.

She is a long-time screenwriter for films directed by Johnnie To and Wai Ka-Fai of Milkyway Image and frequently works alongside writers Wai Ka-Fai, Yau Nai-Hoi and Yip Tin-Shing.

== Filmography ==
Year	Films	Role
2021	Limbo	writer
2016	Sisterhood	writer
2013	Cold Eyes	writer
2011	Life Without Principle	writer
2016	Sisterhood	writer
2009	Written By	writer
2009	Tactical Unit - Comrades in Arms	writer
2007	Mad Detective	writer
2007	Triangle	writer
2007	Eye in the Sky	writer
2006	The Shopaholics	writer
2004	Yesterday Once More	writer
2004	Throw Down	writer
2004	Fantasia	writer
2003	Running on Karma	writer
2003	Turn Left, Turn Right	writer
2003	PTU	writer
2003	Love for All Seasons	writer
2002	My Left Eye Sees Ghosts	writer
2002	Fat Choi Spirit	writer
2001	Running Out of Time 2	writer
2001	Love on a Diet	script supervisor
1995	Fatal Assignment	writer

== Awards and nominations ==
Year	Nominated work	Category	Award
2003	PTU (2003)	Won: Best Screenplay (shared with Yau Nai-Hoi)	Golden Horse Film Festival
2003	Turn Left, Turn Right (2003)	Nominated: Best Screenplay Shared with Wai Ka-Fai, Au Kin-Yee and Yip Tin-Shing	Golden Horse Film Festival
2004	PTU (2003)	Won: Best Screenplay (shared with Yau Nai-Hoi)	Golden Bauhinia Awards
2004	Throw Down (2004)	Won: Best Screenplay (shared with Yau Nai-Hoi and Yip Tin-Shing)	Golden Horse Film Festival
2004	Running on Karma (2003)	Won: Best Screenplay (shared with Wai Ka-Fai, Yau Nai-Hoi and Yip Tin-Shing)	Hong Kong Film Awards
2004	Running on Karma (2003)	Won: Best Screenplay (shared with Wai Ka-Fai, Yau Nai-Hoi and Yip Tin-Shing)	Hong Kong Film Critics Society Awards
2008	Mad Detective (2007)	Won: Best Screenplay (shared with Wai Ka-Fai)	Hong Kong Film Awards
2008	Mad Detective (2007)	Nominated: Best Screenplay (shared with Wai Ka-Fai)	Asian Film Awards
2008	Eye in the Sky (2007)	Nominated: Best Screenplay (shared with Yau Nai-Hoi)	Hong Kong Film Awards
2008	Eye in the Sky (2007)	Won: Best Screenplay (shared with Yau Nai-Hoi)	Asian Film Awards
2010	Written By (2009)	Nominated: Best Screenplay (shared with Wai Ka-Fai)	29th Hong Kong Film Awards
2022	Limbo (2021)	Won: Best Adapted Screenplay (shared with Shum Kwan-sin)	59th Golden Horse Awards
