= Running on Karma =

2003 Hong Kong film by Johnnie To and Wai Ka-fai

- Film poster

Chinese name
- Traditional Chinese: 大隻佬
- Simplified Chinese: 大只佬
Transcriptions
- Directed by: Johnnie To; Wai Ka-fai
- Written by: Wai Ka-fai; Yau Nai-hoi; Au Kin-yee; Yip Tin-shing
- Produced by: Johnnie To; Wai Ka-fai
- Starring: Andy Lau; Cecilia Cheung
- Cinematography: Cheng Siu-Keung
- Edited by: Law Wing-cheung
- Music by: Cacine Wong
- Production companies: One Hundred Years of Film; Milkyway Image
- Distributed by: China Star Entertainment Group
- Release date: 27 September 2003
- Running time: 93 minutes
- Country: Hong Kong
- Language: Cantonese
- Box office: HK$26,339,848

Running on Karma (traditional Chinese: 大隻佬; simplified Chinese: 大只佬/大块头有大智慧; Literal Title: Big Guy/Big Guy Has Big Wisdom), also known as An Intelligent Muscle Man, is a 2003 Hong Kong action thriller film produced and directed by Johnnie To and Wai Ka-fai. The film is ultimately a Buddhist parable about the nature of karma. There were some cuts in the mainland China edition to meet the requirements for release there.

This is the second film starring Andy Lau in which he wears a prosthetic suit. In his previous film, Love on a Diet, he wore a fat suit, while in this film, he wears a muscle suit. Principal photography began from March to July 2003, though filming was interrupted in April due to the SARS pandemic.

Running on Karma was a critical and commercial success, grossing HK$26,339,848 at the Hong Kong box office, making it the third-highest-grossing film of the year in the territory, and received 13 nominations at the 23rd Hong Kong Film Awards, winning Best Film, Best Screenplay and Best Actor for Lau, who wins the award for the second time after being awarded for his performance in Running Out of Time in 2000. In addition, Lau's performance in the film also won him the Hong Kong Film Critics Society Award for Best Actor and the Chinese Film Media Awards for Best Actor of the Hong Kong/Taiwan region.

== Plot ==
Big (Andy Lau) was a Buddhist Monk, but he gave up this occupation when he realized he could see a person's past life, which would mean he would be able to predict what would happen to that person because of Karma. Big then became a bodybuilder and worked in a strip bar when he ran into Lee Fung-yee (Cecilia Cheung). Lee was working as an undercover cop in the CID which busted Big in his strip show, but Big became entangled in another police case to catch a murderer when he tried to escape.

While Big was running away from Lee's pursuit, he saw a police dog and has visions of the dog's previous life. The dog was previously a child who beat up dogs, and the dog was shot by a stray bullet meant for the criminal. This was the first time that Big showed his ability to see the past, and later saw the past life of Lee, a Japanese soldier killing civilians.

Big (after realizing that Lee was kind-hearted), decided to help her in the investigation of a homicide, but also swore to leave her after they solved the case. After Big had inspected the corpse, he saw the deceased's previous life. The deceased had betrayed the murderer in his previous life and hence killed by him in this life. Big also saw that in the previous life of the murderer, before the murderer died, he cut off a one-horn beetle's left arm and hence deduced that in the current life, there would be someone without a left arm who would help to find the present murderer. Big successfully helped the police to arrest the murderer and saved Lee's life in the process as well. Her karma gets broken as well but subsequently returned, as seen through Big's vision. He also stopped an angry police sergeant who was beating the murderer by saying to him, "One thought Heaven, One thought Hell" (一念天堂，一念地獄).

Lee, now realizing that she was, in her previous life, a Japanese soldier, made efforts to compensate for the atrocities she committed in her previous life. Deciding to repay Big before she dies, Lee decided to find Big's childhood friend's killer, and she thinks the killer is hiding in the mountains somewhere. She went to the mountains and on the sixth day of her journey, she encounters the killer at a part of the mountains where Big never went to find his friend's killer. The killer runs away from her while she tries to help him. Then, the killer comes behind her, and drags her to a rocky place where she was hit by a rock in the head, and beheaded by the murderer. The whole incident was recorded by her video camera. The video camera was retrieved after a search party to look for her. Big saw the video after a police officer showed it to him and he gets angry and goes to the mountains. When he was on the mountains, he heard Lee's watch. He followed the sound to her buried body in the ground and her head in a tree. He became enraged and pursued a man, presuming he is Lee's killer into an underground temple. Big, expecting to find the killer in the temple but found his future self, a killer, bloodthirsty and vengeful. They argued and fought and came to terms peacefully in meditation.

Big becomes a monk again and lives on the mountain. After five years, he meets his childhood friend's killer again, and in forgiveness, escorts him kindly to the police. In the end, at the "place where Big couldn't jump over", it is shown that the positive karma that Lee cultivated and radiated ultimately saved Big.

== Cast ==
- Andy Lau as Big
- Cecilia Cheung as Inspector Lee Fung-yee
- Cheung Siu-fai as Inspector Chung
- Karen Tong as Woman whose left arm got shot off
- Chun Wong as Lee's superior officer
- Wong Wa-wo as Lee's colleague
- Hon Kwok-choi as Slippery thief
- Yuen Bun as Chef
- Yu Wenzhong as Master Wu
- Hou Liansheng as Master Wen
- He Shengwei
- Zhang Meng as Jade
- Wong Chi-wai as Big's drinking friend
- So Wai-nam as CID
- Eddie Che as CID
- Frank Liu as CID
- Ho Chung-wai as CID
- Vincent Chik as CID
- Lam Kwok-kit as CID
- Hon Ping as Four Eyes
- Wong Chun-fai as Boxing commentator
- Tam Tin-po
- Wong Man-chun as Policeman
- Cash Lee

== Production ==
Hilary Hongjin He, a doctoral student at the University of Western Sydney, wrote that the version of the film released in mainland China required "substantial" editing by mainland authorities to the point that it "fundamentally degraded the philosophical, thought-provoking movie to a senseless commercial film selling stars and special effects make-up".

== Awards and nominations ==
Awards and nominations
| Ceremony | Category | Recipient | Outcome |
|---|---|---|---|
23rd Hong Kong Film Awards
| 23rd Hong Kong Film Awards | Best Film | Running on Karma | Won |
| 23rd Hong Kong Film Awards | Best Director | Johnnie To, Wai Ka-fai | Nominated |
| 23rd Hong Kong Film Awards | Best Actor | Andy Lau | Won |
| 23rd Hong Kong Film Awards | Best Actress | Cecilia Cheung | Nominated |
| 23rd Hong Kong Film Awards | Best Screenplay | Wai Ka-fai, Yau Nai-hoi, Au Kin-yee, Yip Tin-shing | Won |
| 23rd Hong Kong Film Awards | Best Supporting Actor | Cheung Siu-fai | Nominated |
| 23rd Hong Kong Film Awards | Best Film Editing | Law Wing-cheung | Nominated |
| 23rd Hong Kong Film Awards | Best Art Direction | Bruce Yu | Nominated |
| 23rd Hong Kong Film Awards | Best Costume Make Up Design | Bruce Yu, Stephanie Wong | Nominated |
| 23rd Hong Kong Film Awards | Best Action Choreography | Yuen Bun | Nominated |
| 23rd Hong Kong Film Awards | Best Original Film Song | Song: Affairs Beyond a Human Being (身外情) Composer: Gaybird; Lyrics: Albert Leung; Sung by: Anthony Wong | Nominated |
| 23rd Hong Kong Film Awards | Best Sound Design | Martin Chappell, May Mok, Charlie Lo | Nominated |
| 23rd Hong Kong Film Awards | Best Visual Effects | Stephen Ma | Nominated |
10th Hong Kong Film Critics Society Awards
| 10th Hong Kong Film Critics Society Awards | Best Actor | Andy Lau | Won |
| 10th Hong Kong Film Critics Society Awards | Best Actress | Cecilia Cheung | Won |
| 10th Hong Kong Film Critics Society Awards | Best Screenplay | Wai Ka-fai, Yau Nai-hoi, Au Kin-yee, Yip Tin-shing | Won |
| 10th Hong Kong Film Critics Society Awards | Film of Merit | Running on Karma | Won |
| 9th Golden Bauhinia Awards | Best Film | Running on Karma | Nominated |
| 9th Golden Bauhinia Awards | Best Director | Johnnie To, Wai Ka-fai | Nominated |
| 9th Golden Bauhinia Awards | Best Actor | Andy Lau | Nominated |
| 9th Golden Bauhinia Awards | Best Screenplay | Wai Ka-fai, Yau Nai-hoi, Au Kin-yee, Yip Tin-shing | Nominated |
| 9th Golden Bauhinia Awards | Top 10 Chinese-language film | Running on Karma | Won |
| HKSAR 10th Anniversary Film Awards | Best Actor | Andy Lau | Nominated |
| HKSAR 10th Anniversary Film Awards | Best Screenplay | Wai Ka-fai, Yau Nai-hoi, Au Kin-yee, Yip Tin-shing | Nominated |
| HKSAR 10th Anniversary Film Awards | Most Creative Film | Running on Karma | Nominated |
41st Golden Horse Awards
| 41st Golden Horse Awards | Best Costume Make Up Design | Bruce Yu, Stephanie Wong | Nominated |
| 41st Golden Horse Awards | Best Original Film Song | Song: Affairs Beyond a Human Being (身外情) Composer: Gaybird; Lyrics: Albert Leung; Sung by: Anthony Wong | Nominated |
| 41st Golden Horse Awards | Best Action Choreography | Yuen Bun | Nominated |
| 41st Golden Horse Awards | Best Visual Effects | Stephen Ma | Nominated |
| 4th Chinese Film Media Awards | Best Film (Hong Kong/Taiwan) | Running on Karma | Nominated |
| 4th Chinese Film Media Awards | Best Director (Hong Kong/Taiwan) | Johnnie To, Wai Ka-fai | Nominated |
| 4th Chinese Film Media Awards | Best Actor (Hong Kong/Taiwan) | Andy Lau | Nominated |
| 4th Chinese Film Media Awards | Best Actress (Hong Kong/Taiwan) | Cecilia Cheung | Nominated |
| 4th Chinese Film Media Awards | Best Screenplay (Hong Kong/Taiwan) | Wai Ka-fai, Yau Nai-hoi, Au Kin-yee, Yip Tin-shing | Won |
| 4th Chinese Film Media Awards | Most Popular Film from Hong Kong/Taiwan | Running on Karma | Nominated |
| 4th Chinese Film Media Awards | Most Popular Actor from Hong Kong/Taiwan | Andy Lau | Silver |
| 4th Chinese Film Media Awards | Most Popular Actress from Hong Kong/Taiwan | Cecilia Cheung | Gold |

== See also ==
- Andy Lau filmography
- Johnnie To filmography
- List of films set in Hong Kong
- List of Hong Kong films
