= Exiled (2006 film) =

2006 Hong Kong film by Johnnie To

- American promotional poster

Chinese name
- Traditional Chinese: 放‧逐
- Simplified Chinese: 放‧逐
Transcriptions
- Directed by: Johnnie To
- Written by: Szeto Kam-Yuen; Yip Tin-shing
- Produced by: Johnnie To
- Starring: Anthony Wong; Francis Ng; Nick Cheung; Josie Ho; Roy Cheung; Lam Suet; Richie Jen; Simon Yam
- Cinematography: Cheng Siu-Keung
- Edited by: David Richardson
- Music by: Dave Klotz; Guy Zerafa
- Production companies: Media Asia Films; Milkyway Image
- Distributed by: Media Asia Distribution
- Release dates: 6 September 2006 (Venice Film Festival); 19 October 2006 (Hong Kong)
- Running time: 110 minutes
- Country: Hong Kong
- Languages: Cantonese; Mandarin

Exiled (Chinese: 放‧逐; Cantonese Yale: Fong3‧zuk6) is a 2006 Hong Kong action drama film produced and directed by Johnnie To, and starring Anthony Wong, Francis Ng, Nick Cheung, Josie Ho, Roy Cheung and Lam Suet, with special appearances by Richie Jen and Simon Yam. The action takes place in contemporary Macau. The film made its premiere at the 63rd Venice International Film Festival, and was in competition for the Golden Lion.

== Plot ==
In 1998 Macau, former mobster Wo (Nick Cheung) lives quietly with his wife, Jin (Josie Ho), and his newborn child in an undistinguished apartment, having turned over a new leaf. However, vengeful mobster Boss Fay (Simon Yam)—whom Wo once tried to assassinate—has dispatched a pair of ageing hitmen to cut that peaceful existence short. Once arrived, Wo's childhood friends and hitmen Blaze (Anthony Wong), Fat (Lam Suet), Tai (Francis Ng) and Cat (Roy Cheung), discuss if they are going to protect Wo or carry on with the boss' orders. Following a brief showdown, the whole group comes to an uneasy truce, lay their weapons down and bond over dinner— after all, these men grew up together in the same gang. Reunited and hungry for another score, they visit a fixer named Jeff (Cheung Siu-fai), who gives the gang the job of killing a rival boss, Boss Keung (Gordon Lam), as well as telling them about the location of a large quantity of gold being transported for a corrupt official. Wo makes the gang promise that if anything happens to him, his wife and son will be looked after.

Later that night, the friends find Boss Keung in a restaurant. However, Boss Fay, wanting to take over the other boss's territory, interrupts the meeting. Boss Fay recognising Blaze sitting in the restaurant, openly chastises and humiliates him for not killing Wo, culminating in Fay shooting Blaze. However, unbeknownst to Fay, Blaze is wearing a bulletproof vest and survives. Wo, seeing this, opens fire before Fay can finish Blaze off. A gunfight erupts in the restaurant with Fay being shot in the leg and Keung in the arm. The two bosses come to an agreement to share territory and profits, and to kill the gang of friends.

Having narrowly escaped the restaurant shootout, the friends decide to take a severely wounded Wo to an underground clinic for medical assistance. After negotiating a price, the doctor operates and removes the bullets from Wo. However, as he is sewing up Wo's wound, there is a loud banging at the door, leading the waiting friends to hide in the doctor's flat. The door is answered and both Fay and Keung burst in seeking help for their injuries sustained in the restaurant shootout. Fay pushes a still unconscious Wo out of the way and orders the doctor to tend to his wound first. Meanwhile, Keung takes a look around the flat and comes across a hiding Fat. Realizing that they have been found, the gang begin to dispatch the henchmen. Meanwhile, Wo wakes up and slowly gets to his feet to escape before collapsing. The rest of the friends not knowing where Wo ended up, make an exit down the back of the apartment. However, whilst escaping across the back courtyard, Boss Fay throws Wo from a high window and pins down Wo's friends preventing any rescue attempt. The gang desperately try to retrieve their critically injured friend, but Fay still fires at them and even manages to shoot Wo. Quick thinking Fat seeing that his friend has come to rest on some tarpaulin pulls Wo to safety and the gang escape. Now in the car, Wo, knowing he is near death, asks to be taken back to his wife and son. Wo dies shortly after.

Handing Wo's body over to his wife, Jin, she demands to know what has happened and in her grief opens fire on Blaze and Tai who run away. Jin contemplates killing herself and her son, but thinks better of it. She instead smashes up the furniture in the house and makes a funeral pyre for Wo. She then sets fire to Wo and the flat and leaves with her son. The reduced gang leave the city in search of the gold. After coming across the heavily guarded convoy carrying the gold, they flip a coin to decide whether to hijack it or not. The coin comes up tails meaning they will not proceed with the robbery. After carrying on down the road however, they come across the convoy being ambushed by another gang. They witness all the police officers bar one crack-shot being killed. The friends decide to help the officer (Richie Jen) by dispatching the rest of the gang. The friends appreciating the policeman's sharp shooting decide to split the gold with him and drive off to a hidden dock to transport it to the mainland and a new life. Meanwhile, back in the city, Jin still furious about the death of her husband goes looking for the friends, asking many people until she is recognised by the fixer Jeff who in turn contacts his boss, Boss Fay.

Fay with a captured Jin calls a gloating Blaze, who is then informed of the situation. He is told to meet Fay at midnight otherwise Jin and her son will be killed. Determined to protect Jin after Wo's death, the friends agree and leave the officer at the dock with the gold telling him they will return by dawn. Once at the meeting place, the four friends are confronted by Jin, whom Fay allows to shoot Blaze in revenge. However, Blaze is again hit in the chest, surviving due to his bullet proof vest. Tai steps in, throwing a bag of gold at Fay's feet and telling him that he can have it all if Fay lets them go. Fay agrees, but tells them Blaze must stay to face the consequences of not following orders. Blaze agrees to this deal and the remainder of the friends leave with Jin. However, as they leave, Tai informs Jin of the boat and the policeman and tells her to drive there. With Jin safe, the greatly outnumbered friends open fire. In the resulting gunfight, everyone is killed, including Boss Fay and Boss Keung. As the friends lie dying, they all smile knowing they have kept their promise to Wo.

== Cast ==
- Anthony Wong as Blaze
- Francis Ng as Tai
- Nick Cheung as Wo
- Josie Ho as Jin, Wo's wife
- Roy Cheung as Cat
- Lam Suet as Fat
- Richie Jen as Sergeant Chen (special appearance)
- Simon Yam as Boss Fay (special appearance)
- Gordon Lam as Boss Keung
- Cheung Siu-fai as Jeff
- Tam Ping-man as Uncle Fortune
- Benz Hui as Sergeant Shan
- Ellen Chan as Hooker
- Wong Chi-wai as Darkie

== Reception ==
=== Festivals ===
Exiled was shown in Competition at the 63rd Venice International Film Festival. It was also shown at the 2006 Toronto International Film Festival, the 2007 Bangkok International Film Festival, 2007 8th Jeonju International Film Festival, 2008 Midnight Sun Film Festival and the 2007 Seattle International Film Festival.

=== Category III Rating ===
The film was awarded a Category III rating (18+ restriction), particularly for one scene showing Simon Yam's character shaking hands with another gangster with their left hands turned around, making a triads agreement handshake. The scene is present on the Mega-Star uncut Limited Edition DVD. However, only the Category IIB cut version was released in Hong Kong theatrically.

=== Box office ===
On its opening weekend, the film grossed a total of US$47,533 in Hong Kong. Its total HK box-office take was US$687,434.

It was later released in the United States with an R-rating by the MPAA "for strong violence and some sexual content." Following its limited released in the United States, Exiled grossed US$20,351 on opening weekend, and US$49,413 in total.

=== Distribution ===
Magnolia Pictures acquired the North American rights of Exiled and gave it a limited release on 31 August 2007. The North American DVD was released on 11 January 2008.

=== Critical reception ===
Exiled received fairly good reviews in the United States. The film is currently one of the highest-rated limited-release films of 2007 on Rotten Tomatoes at 82%. Critics often made comparisons to the early Spaghetti Western pictures of Sergio Leone and Sam Peckinpah, hailing the film for its action sequences and dark humour. Newsweek ranked the film 4th in 2007's "Best Action Movie Scenes"

"It's the Milkyway Film fan's dream – and Johnnie To seems to know it. For the director, Exiled is a lateral move, delivering a predictable and even pandering experience. However, the film also delivers what every longtime Milkyway fan is probably looking for, and it does so with a gusto that's exciting and exhilarating. Frankly, this movie may be review-proof."

— Love HK Film's review.

Other critics were less enthused by the film; Roger Ebert of the Chicago Sun-Times, awarded it a 2.5/5 star rating, writing:

Johnnie To, the director, is highly respected in this genre, and I suppose he does it about as well as you'd want it to be done, unless you wanted acting and more coherence.

== Accolades ==
Awards
Award	Category	Recipient(s)	Outcome
26th Hong Kong Film Awards
26th Hong Kong Film Awards	Best Film	Exiled	Nominated
26th Hong Kong Film Awards	Best Director	Johnnie To	Nominated
26th Hong Kong Film Awards	Best Film Editing	David M. Richardson	Nominated
26th Hong Kong Film Awards	Best Cinematography	Cheng Siu-Keung	Nominated
63rd Venice International Film Festival
63rd Venice International Film Festival	Golden Lion	Johnnie To	Nominated
12th Golden Bauhinia Awards
12th Golden Bauhinia Awards	Best Film	Exiled	Won
12th Golden Bauhinia Awards	Best Director	Johnnie To	Won
43rd Golden Horse Film Festival
43rd Golden Horse Film Festival	Best Feature Film	Exiled	Nominated
43rd Golden Horse Film Festival	Best Director	Johnnie To	Nominated
43rd Golden Horse Film Festival	Best Film Editing	David M. Richardson	Nominated
43rd Golden Horse Film Festival	Best Action Choreography	Ling Chun-pong, Wong Chi-wai	Won
43rd Golden Horse Film Festival	Audience Poll Award	Exiled	Won
13th Hong Kong Film Critics Society Awards
13th Hong Kong Film Critics Society Awards	Best Director	Johnnie To	Won
13th Hong Kong Film Critics Society Awards	Film of Merit	Exiled	Won
37th Sitges Film Festival	Best Director	Johnnie To	Won

=== Remake ===
Hong Kong film distributor Media Asia Group has announced a remake of Exiled. The company brokered a deal with film producer Samuel Hadida, who is attached as a producer.

The Indian Malayalam film Bachelor Party, released on 15 June 2012, is an uncredited remake of the film Exiled.

== See also ==
- List of Hong Kong films
- List of films set in Macau
