= Election 2 =

2006 Hong Kong film by Johnnie To

- Original Hong Kong theatrical poster

Chinese name
- Traditional Chinese: 黑社會:以和爲貴
- Simplified Chinese: 黑社会:以和为贵
Transcriptions
Standard Mandarin
- Hanyu Pinyin: Hēi Shè Huì Yǐ Hé Wéi Guì
Yue: Cantonese
- Jyutping: Hak1 Se5 Wui2 Ji5 Wo4 Wai4 Gwai3
- Directed by: Johnnie To
- Written by: Yau Nai-Hoi; Yip Tin-Shing
- Produced by: Dennis Law; Johnnie To
- Starring: Louis Koo; Simon Yam; Nick Cheung; Cheung Siu-fai; Lam Suet; Gordon Lam
- Cinematography: Cheng Siu-Keung
- Edited by: Law Wing-Cheong; Jeff Cheung
- Music by: Robert Ellis-Geiger
- Production companies: Milkyway Image; One Hundred Years of Film
- Distributed by: China Star Entertainment Group
- Release date: 27 April 2006
- Running time: 92 minutes
- Country: Hong Kong
- Languages: Cantonese; Mandarin
- Box office: US$1.8 million

Election 2 (literal title: Black Society: Harmony is a Virtue), also known as Triad Election in the United States, is a 2006 Category III Hong Kong crime film directed by Johnnie To with a large ensemble cast including Louis Koo, Simon Yam and Nick Cheung. A sequel to the 2005 film Election, the film concludes the events of the first film centring on triad boss Lok, who struggles to get re-elected as his two-year term approaches its end. He faces competition from Jimmy, who wants to retire from the triad to be a legitimate businessman but gets drawn into the conflict surrounding the election.

Election 2 was a critical and commercial success, and was shown as an "Official Selection" at the 2006 Cannes Film Festival. Afterwards, it became a popular hit on the international festival circuit.

The film has been described by multiple academics as the most directly political film made in the post-1997 era. Director Johnnie To has spoken repeatedly of his intention to make a third Election film, however he has referred to media censorship and the 2020 Hong Kong national security law as obstacles to the production of the film.

== Plot ==
Lok, who was elected chairman of the Hong Kong triad Wo Lin Shing for two years during the first film, contemplates breaking tradition by seeking re-election for an unprecedented second term. Lok meets his triad godsons, Big-Head, Jet, Jimmy, Kun, and Mr. So. Kun, who has been released from jail after the events of the first film, declares his candidacy for triad chairman. Kun asks for Lok's support, but Lok declines. Lok privately offers support to Jet for chairmanship if Jet will kill for him, despite Jet being disfavored by triad elders.

The triad elders view Jimmy as a good potential chairman as he has become a successful businessman, but Jimmy refuses to run because he is trying to change his business activity in Mainland China from illegitimate to legitimate and he is wary of letting triad activities affect his business. Jimmy promotes his boxing partner and junior triad member Lik to work more closely with him. During a trip to Mainland China to bribe a local official, Jimmy and Lik are arrested by the Mainland Chinese police. Guangdong Public Security head Xi personally releases Jimmy, while indicating that Jimmy cannot do business in Mainland China unless he becomes Wo Lin Shing's next chairman, works with the Mainland police, and acts patriotically.

After Jimmy enters the election as a strong candidate, Lok urges Kun during a fishing trip to withdraw from the election, asking for Kun's support for Lok's second term, and promising to support Kun in the next election. Kun counter-offers of becoming co-chairmen with Lok. With neither backing down, physical conflict nearly arises, but witnesses arrive at the scene, and the two agree to take down Jimmy first. Jimmy hires professional hitman Bo, and then has Lik murdered after triad elders inform Jimmy that Lik is a police informant.

Kun kidnaps Jimmy's financial backer Mr. Kwok and hides him in a coffin together with Big-Head. Lok threatens to kill Mr. Kwok if Jimmy does not withdraw from the race, but Jimmy refuses. Lok hides the Dragonhead Baton, the symbol of the chairman's authority, in Mainland China. When triad elder Uncle Teng tells Lok not to run for a second term and predicts Jimmy's ascension, Lok murders Uncle Teng and sends Jet to assassinate Jimmy. Jet takes Jimmy and Jimmy's wife hostage. Jimmy indicates that Lok is deceitfully using Jet, while Jimmy's wife hits Jet and escapes. Jet releases Jimmy unharmed, and Jimmy refuses to let Bo kill Jet.

Jimmy and Bo orchestrate the kidnapping of Lok's lieutenants to persuade them to kill Lok without revealing Jimmy's involvement. They agree after Jimmy personally murders one of Lok's lieutenants, dismembers him, and feeds his remains to dogs. Kun attempts to assassinate Jimmy, but fails. Bo rescues the coffin containing Mr. Kwok and Big-Head, passing it to Jimmy. Kun kills Bo in retaliation. Jimmy passes the coffin to the police, exposing Kun's kidnapping and causing Kun to flee Hong Kong. Meanwhile, Lok's young son has grown distant from him, performing badly in school and associating with gangs. Lok finds gangsters exhorting his son, who runs away as Lok chases after him. Shortly after, Lok is assassinated by his lieutenants. After Jimmy denies ordering Lok's death under oath, the triad elders elect Jimmy as chairman, and he vows to step down in two years. Later, Jimmy rescues Jet from an attack by armed men, but Jet rebuffs Jimmy's offer to work together.

When Jimmy visits Mainland China again, his legitimate business is proceeding with approval by the Mainland police. Xi passes Jimmy the Dragonhead Baton, which the Mainland police seized from Lok's underling. Xi indicates that the good relationship between the triad and the Mainland police is contingent on Jimmy serving as chairman until he can pass on leadership to his future children, as the Mainland police do not want an uncontrollable and unstable triad leader like Lok, whereas Jimmy would help maintain peace in the country. This devastates Jimmy, because he wanted himself and his children to find success outside the triad. Jimmy repeatedly punches Xi, who does not retaliate, instead thanking Jimmy for his future cooperation. Jimmy buries the Dragonhead Baton with Uncle Teng. The film ends with Jimmy's wife revealing her pregnancy to him, leaving Jimmy to reflect on his family's future.

== Cast ==
- Louis Koo as Jimmy Lee, a triad member and businessman
- Simon Yam as Lok, the previous triad chairman
- Nick Cheung as Jet, a triad assassin
- Gordon Lam as Kun, a triad member
- Cheung Siu-fai as Mr. So, a triad lawyer
- Lam Suet as Big-Head, a triad member
- Wong Tin-lam as Uncle Teng, a triad elder
- Mark Cheng as Bo, a professional hitman
- Andy On as Lik, a junior triad member
- You Yong as Assistant Police Chief Xi
- Alan Chui Chung-San as Uncle Tank, a triad elder

== Release ==
The film did not get a Mainland Chinese release, unlike the first film.

== Reception ==
US poster of Election 2.

=== Festivals ===
The film first appeared at the 2006 Hong Kong International Film Festival. Election 2 was also shown in "Out of Competition" (midnight screenings) section at the 2006 Cannes Film Festival, where the movie was very well received by international critics. Afterward, Election 2 became a popular hit on the international film festival circuit.

- Official Selection of 2006 Cannes Film Festival (Out-of-Competition midnight screening)
- Official Selection of Toronto International Film Festival, New York Film Festival, Pusan International Film Festival, Festival de Cine de Sitges, Chicago International Film Festival, Melbourne International Film Festival, Stockholm International Film Festival, Torino Film Festival, AFI Fest, Tokyo Filmex, Palm Springs International Film Festival, Santa Barbara International Film Festival, Rotterdam Film Festival, Mar del Plata Film Festival, Philadelphia Film Festival, Indianapolis International Film Festival, Moscow International Film Festival, Locarno International Film Festival.

=== Hong Kong distribution ===
- Election 2 opened in Hong Kong on 27 April 2006 and grossed about HK$13.57 million domestically; it was less than the first film's earnings of HK$15.89 million, but HK$13.57 million was still quite high for a movie which received a Category III rating (18+ restriction) in Hong Kong.
- The film was named best film of 2006 in the Hong Kong Film Critics Society Awards.
- In 2007, the film was nominated for the following Hong Kong Film Awards: Best Film, Best Director, Best Screenplay, Best Supporting Actor (Simon Yam) and Best Supporting Actor (Nick Cheung).

=== Worldwide distribution ===
Election 2 was sold to more than 21 territories, including Tartan Films for the United States, Optimum Releasing for the United Kingdom, ARP Selection for France, A-Film Distribution for Netherlands, Ripley's Film for Italy, Avalon Productions for Spain, NonStop Entertainment for Scandinavia, Maywin Media for Russia, Fine Films for Japan, Hopscotch Films for Australia, California Filmes in Brazil and 791cine for Argentina.

In May 2006, Tartan Films acquired all United States distribution rights of Election 2. Tartan Films released this movie in the US theatrically under the new title Triad Election on 25 April 2007. Despite receiving very little promotion, in the United States, the film still had the highest per-screen average box office on the weekend it opened.

=== Critical reception ===
Election 2 received generally positive reviews, with a 96% "Fresh" rating on Rotten Tomatoes. In addition, it was ranked one of the top films of 2007 on Metacritic with a score of 83 out of 100. Manohla Dargis of The New York Times wrote that the movie is an "exemplary gangster thriller."

== Bibliography ==
=== Journals ===
- Bettinson, Gary (1 April 2024). "Milkyway meditations: An interview with Johnnie To". Asian Cinema. 35 (1): 159–176. doi:10.1386/ac_00080_7. ISSN 1059-440X.
