= Life Without Principle (film) =

2011 Hong Kong film by Johnnie To

- Film poster

Chinese name
- Traditional Chinese: 奪命金
- Simplified Chinese: 夺命金
Transcriptions
Standard Mandarin
- Hanyu Pinyin: Duó Mìng Jīn
Yue: Cantonese
- Jyutping: Dyut6 Ming1 Gam1
- Directed by: Johnnie To
- Screenplay by: Au Kin-yee; Ben Wong; Milkyway Creative Team
- Produced by: Johnnie To
- Starring: Lau Ching-wan; Richie Jen; Denise Ho
- Cinematography: Cheng Siu-Keung; To Hung-mo
- Edited by: David Richardson; Allen Leung
- Music by: Yue Wei
- Production companies: Media Asia Films; Milkyway Image
- Distributed by: Media Asia Distributions
- Release dates: 9 September 2011 (Venice Film Festival); 20 October 2011 (Hong Kong)
- Running time: 106 minutes
- Country: Hong Kong
- Language: Cantonese
- Box office: HK$8.43 million CNY25 million

Life Without Principle is a 2011 Hong Kong crime drama film produced and directed by Johnnie To and starring Lau Ching-wan, Richie Jen and Denise Ho. This film was screened in competition at the 68th Venice Film Festival on 9 September 2011. The North America distribution rights was purchased by Indomina Group shortly after the Festival. The deal was made between Indomina and the film's sales agent Media Asia Group.

The film was selected as the Hong Kong entry for the Best Foreign Language Oscar at the 85th Academy Awards, but it did not make the final shortlist.

== Plot ==
Teresa works in mutual fund sales at a bank and is anxious about not making her sales quotas. Her failure to sell some mutual funds to loan shark Chung Yuen leaves her frustrated and fearful about getting fired for poor sales performance. Teresa eventually sells some mutual funds to Siu-kuen, an old senior who is unfit for the risk profile of the funds.

Connie feels frustrated by her husband Ching-fong's reluctance to buy a condo. Connie approaches Teresa to inquire about criteria to qualify for a mortgage. On an impulse Connie commits to a mortgage for a condo purchase, but the condo price drops due to market volatility. She tries to back out of the purchase but is unable to do so. Eventually the property agent was able to find a buyer who offers her more than her purchase price.

Panther is overseeing the birthday banquet for his triad boss Lai Kwan. During the banquet, Ching-fong arrives to arrest Yiu-wah. Panther raises funds for bailing out Yiu-wah. Dragon helps Panther to bail out Yiu-wah, and in the process, invites Panther setup an account to trade the Hang Seng Futures market. Dragon loses a lot of money in a Futures trade from an account that he borrowed from mob boss Mr. Sung. Dragon calls upon Panther to help him arrange for a loan from Chung Yuen. While going to pick up the $5 Million loan, Dragon is stabbed by Mr. Sung and eventually dies from the stab wound.

Teresa meets with Chung Yuen to hand over $10 Million in cash withdrawal as per his instructions. However, Dragon negotiates with Chung Yuen to borrow just $5 Million. In a rush to meet with Dragon to deliver the cash, Chung Yuen instructs to Teresa to deposit the remaining $5 Million back into his account but does not sign any deposit slip. On his way to meet with Dragon, Chung Yuen is attacked before Panther has a chance to rob him. Chung Yuen fights off the attacker but dies from his wounds. Panther collects the $5Million and uses it to place a bet on the Futures market in an attempt to recuperate Dragon's losses. The bet makes a lot of profit, but since Dragon has died, Panther keeps the winnings.

Teresa, upon seeing that Chung Yuen has died from his wounds, keeps the remaining $5Million and resigns from the bank.

== Cast ==
- Lau Ching-wan as Panther (三腳豹)
- Richie Jen as Senior Inspector Cheung Ching-fong (張正方)
- Denise Ho as Teresa Chan
- Myolie Wu as Connie
- Lo Hoi-pang as Chung Yuen (鍾原)
- So Hang-suen as Cheng Siu-kuen (鄭小娟)
- Philip Keung as Dragon (凸眼龍)
- Cheung Siu-fai as Ng Yiu-wah (吳耀華)
- Felix Wong as Sam (火爆森)
- Wong Chi-yin as Sergeant Lee Chi-man (李致文)
- Stephanie Che as Jackie
- JJ Jia as Ms. Ho (何小姐)
- Yoyo Chen as T.T. Chau
- Terence Yin as Mr. Sung (宋先生)
- Tam Ping-man as Lai Kwan (黎坤)
- Lee Siu-kei as Brother Sai (西哥)
- Frankie Ng as Brother B (B哥)
- Alan Chui Chung-San as Sung's Thug
- Law Wing-cheung as Master Wing (榮師傅)
- Vincent Sze as East Kowloon Anti-Crime Unit officer
- Anson Leung as Kwan Tat-man (關達文)
- Ellesmere Choi as Short film narrator

== Awards and nominations ==
31st Hong Kong Film Awards

Won

- Best Supporting Actor (Lo Hoi-pang)
- Best Supporting Actress (So Hang-suen)

Nominated

- Best Film
- Best Director (Johnnie To)
- Best Screenplay (Yau Nai-hoi, Yip Tin-shing, Ben Wong, Jeff Cheung)
- Best Actor (Lau Ching-wan)
- Best Editing (David M. Richardson)
- Best Original Song

48th Golden Horse Awards

Won

- Best Actor (Sean Lau)
- Best Director (Johnnie To)
- Best Original Screenplay (Yau Nai-hoi, Yip Tin-shing, Ben Wong, Jeff Cheung)

Nominated

- Best Film
- Best Actress (Denise Ho)
- Best Film Editing (David M. Richardson)

== See also ==
- List of submissions to the 85th Academy Awards for Best Foreign Language Film
- List of Hong Kong submissions for the Academy Award for Best Foreign Language Film
