= Throw Down (film) =

2004 Hong Kong film by Johnnie To

- Film poster
- Directed by: Johnnie To
- Written by: Yau Nai-hoi; Au Kin-yee; Yip Tin-shing
- Produced by: Stephen Lam; Johnnie To
- Starring: Louis Koo; Aaron Kwok; Cherrie Ying; Tony Leung
- Cinematography: Cheng Siu-Keung; To Hung-mo
- Edited by: David Richardson
- Music by: Peter Kam
- Production companies: Sil-Metropole Organisation; Milkyway Image; China Star Entertainment Group; One Hundred Years of Film
- Distributed by: China Star Entertainment Group
- Release date: 8 July 2004
- Running time: 95 minutes
- Country: Hong Kong
- Language: Cantonese
- Box office: HK$8,231,079

Throw Down (traditional Chinese: 柔道龍虎榜; simplified Chinese: 柔道龙虎榜) (Judo Dragon and the Tiger List) is a 2004 Hong Kong martial arts film directed by Johnnie To and starring Louis Koo, Aaron Kwok, Cherrie Ying, and Tony Leung Ka-fai. To dedicated the film to the late Japanese filmmaker Akira Kurosawa and, in making it, had drawn upon elements of Kurosawa's debut feature, Sanshiro Sugata. Throw Down had its premiere at the 61st Venice International Film Festival.

== Plot ==
Karaoke manager and band leader Sze-to Bo is a judo expert and former champion who gave up judo a few years ago for unknown reasons, becoming depressed and an alcoholic. Current judo champion Tony, a competitive fighter, admires Bo and challenges him to a duel. Bo's longtime rival, Lee Ah-kong, also arrives to challenge Bo because of an old unfinished competition.

Mona is a woman from Taiwan who dreams of becoming a singer, but who was nearly forced into prostitution by her evil manager. She seeks refuge in Bo's karaoke and joins Bo in finding his mentor, Cheng, an old, frail man with a son, Ching, who has a mental disability. Cheng asks his disciple to help him to restore the reputation of his dojo, which has fallen into ruins.

Bo eventually can no longer keep his secret and reveals the true reason he gave up judo: he had developed an incurable retinal disease and his vision is gradually declining; he only has one tenth of his vision left. When Master Cheng dies for his ideals battling on the judo stage, Bo's fighting spirit reignites. Bo is determined to defeat all his opponents before losing his vision altogether.

Bo finally accepts Lee's challenge for a one-on-one fight, which takes place in a field outside the ruins of an industrial complex. Tony helps guide Bo to the fight, which is given the stipulation that both fighters cover their eyes. The fight is relatively even until Bo gets the upper hand and scores a dramatic throw on Lee, whose wrap over his eyes falls off. Enraged at getting thrown, Lee prepares to attack Bo when he sees that Bo isn't covering his eyes at all. He's now completely blind. Conceding defeat, Lee ends the fight and Tony and Bo triumphantly walk away.

In the final scene, Bo and Ching stand on a street corner passing out flyers for their dojo.

== Cast ==
- Louis Koo as Sze-to Bo
- Aaron Kwok as Tony
- Cherrie Ying as Mona
- Tony Leung Ka-fai as Lee Kong
- Eddie Cheung Siu-fai as Boss Savage
- Lo Hoi-pang as Cheng
- Calvin Choi as Jing
- Jordan Chan as Mona's agent
- Jack Kao as Mona's father
- Albert Au
- Yeung Fan
- Wing Chung

== Release ==
Throw Down was released in Hong Kong on 8 July 2004 and in the U.S. on 22 July 2004.

== Reception ==
On Metacritic, it has a score of 53 out of 100 based on reviews from four critics (The New York Times, Variety, Village Voice and TV Guide).

== Home media ==
Throw Down was released on both DVD and VCD in Hong Kong on September 3, 2004. In the United States, the film was released on DVD by Tai Seng on July 26, 2005. The film was later released on Blu-ray in Hong Kong by Kam & Ronson Enterprises on August 9, 2011.

On May 18, 2020, British home media company Eureka Entertainment released Throw Down on Blu-ray for its Masters of Cinema collection; this release features a new 4K resolution master of the film and a new audio commentary from Frank Djeng. The film was released on Blu-ray by the Criterion Collection in North America on September 21, 2021, and features new interviews with screenwriter Yau Nai-hoi, composer Peter Kam, and film scholars David Bordwell and Caroline Guo, along with an essay by critic Sean Gilman.
