= Szeto Kam-Yuen =

- Born: 11 July 1964; British Hong Kong
- Died: 13 October 2012 (aged 48); Kowloon, Hong Kong
- Occupation: Screenwriter
- Years active: 1983 - 2012

Chinese name
- Traditional Chinese: 司徒錦源
- Simplified Chinese: 司徒锦源
Transcriptions
Standard Mandarin
- Hanyu Pinyin: Sītú Jǐnyuán
Yue: Cantonese
- Jyutping: si1 tou4 gam2 jyun4
- Musical career
- Also known as: Sze To Kam Yuen; Szeto Kam Yuen

Szeto Kam-Yuen (11 July 1964 – 13 October 2012), sometimes credited as Sze To Kam Yuen or Szeto Kam Yuen, was a Hong Kong screenwriter.

== Career ==
Szeto began his career with TVB and later with Milkyway Image.

He is best known for his action-thrillers including SPL: Sha Po Lang (2005), Exiled (2006) and Flash Point (2007).

Szeto died of lung cancer in Hong Kong at age 48.

=== Partial screenwriter filmography ===
Year	Film	Source
1997	Too Many Ways to Be No. 1	
1998	A Hero Never Dies	
1998	Expect the Unexpected	
1998	The Longest Nite	
2001	Skyline Cruisers	
2003	The Death Curse	
2005	Home Sweet Home	
2005	Mob Sister	
2005	SPL: Sha Po Lang	
2006	Dog Bite Dog	
2006	Exiled	
2007	Flash Point	
2008	Shamo	
2009	Accident	
2012	The Fairy Tale Killer	
2012	Motorway	
2013	Out of Inferno	
2013	Special ID	
2014	The Monkey King	
