= Mad Detective =

2007 Hong Kong film by Johnnie To and Wai Ka-fai

- Theatrical release poster
- Directed by: Johnnie To; Wai Ka-Fai
- Written by: Wai Ka-Fai; Au Kin-Yee
- Produced by: Johnnie To; Wai Ka-Fai
- Starring: Sean Lau; Lam Ka-Tung; Andy On; Kelly Lin
- Cinematography: Cheng Siu-Keung
- Edited by: Tina Baz
- Music by: Xavier Jamaux
- Production companies: One Hundred Years of Film; Milkyway Image
- Distributed by: China Star Entertainment Group (HK); IFC Films (US)
- Release dates: 6 September 2007 (Venice Film Festival); 29 November 2007 (Hong Kong); 18 July 2007 (VOD-US)
- Running time: 89 minutes
- Country: Hong Kong
- Language: Cantonese
- Box office: $2,160,790

Mad Detective (Chinese: 神探) is a 2007 Hong Kong action film produced and directed by Johnnie To and Wai Ka-Fai. Mad Detective was first screened at the 64th Venice International Film Festival, and later premiered at the 2007 Toronto International Film Festival, before being released in Hong Kong on 29 November 2007. The film's screenplay won "Best Screenplay" awards at various Asian film ceremonies.

== Plot ==
Chan Kwai-Bun (Sean Lau) is a brilliant detective with a supernatural gift: seeing a person's "inner personalities" or hidden ghosts, appearing as otherwise unseen people that speak to their creator or host. However, he is forced into retirement after severing his ear and presenting it to his retiring boss. (The gift he later explains was because his boss had no inner personalities, and was entirely honest with himself.)

Later, Inspector Ho Ka-On (Andy On) is investigating the case of Wong Kwok-Chu (Lee Kwok-Lun), a colleague who went missing when he and his partner, Ko Chi-Wai (Lam Ka-Tung), were in pursuit of a suspect. Though Wong has been AWOL for 18 months, his gun has been used in a series of armed robberies. Ho turns to Bun—who now lives in seclusion with his imaginary wife, May Cheung (Kelly Lin)—for assistance in the case.

Bun discovers that rather than being one man, Chi-Wai is a seven-spirit collective—with each spirit perhaps representing an aspect of the seven deadly sins and with the head spirit, or brain, being a business-like woman. Bun suspects that Chi-Wai's gun was stolen by the pursued suspect—an Indian named Naresh Sherma. And he suspects that Chi-Wai killed his partner Wong to use Wong's gun to cover up the loss of his own gun.

During the investigation, at the site of Wong's murder, Bun takes Ho's gun, police ID, and car and continues the investigation on his own. Ho while unarmed encounters an armed and masked Naresh, who leaves him alive but the experience traumatizes Ho. Bun meets Ho again later, and he sees Ho's newly-formed inner personality—a scared, bewildered boy. Bun informs Ho of his suspicions regarding Chi-Wai's murder of Wong and set-up of Naresh Sherma.

Ho attempts to arrest Chi-Wai by proving Chi-Wai is carrying his murdered partner's gun but fails, since Chi-Wai has altered the police database. Additionally, Ho begins to trust Chi-Wai.

Chi-Wai and Ho go to a warehouse to find Naresh Sherma. Bun, secretly tracking them, tries to warn Ho that he is in danger—that he is being set up by Chi-Wai—but Ho no longer trusts Bun. At the warehouse, a shootout occurs, and Sharma, Chi-Wai, and Bun are killed. Ho survives.

As Bun dies, he sees Ho's inner personality, the scared boy, being advised by another personality, the same lead female personality or spirit that was advising Chi-Wai, to come up with an alibi. Ho—as Chi-Wai had done—is seen endlessly rearranging guns to fabricate his own cover story.

== Cast ==
- Sean Lau as Inspector Chan Kwai-Bun, a former police detective.
- Lam Ka-Tung as Officer Ko Chi-Wai, a policeman who is considered a suspect in the disappearance of another officer, Wong Kwok-Chu.
- Andy On as Inspector Ho Ka-On, a detective trying to solve the disappearance of Police Officer Wong Kwok-Chu.
- Flora Chan as Bun's wife May Cheung's inner personality as seen/imagined by Bun.
- Kelly Lin as May Cheung, Bun's wife.
- Lee Kwok-Lun as Officer Wong Kwok-Chu, the missing police officer.
- Jo Kuk as a cunning woman, who appears as Ho Ka-On's inner personality
- Jay Lau as a calculating woman, who appears as one of Ko Chi-Wai's seven inner personalities.
- Lam Suet as Fatso, one of Ko's seven inner personalities.
- Cheung Siu-fai as a violent man who is one of Ko's seven inner personalities.
- Eddy Ko as a retiring police chief.
- Singh Harithan Bitto as Naresh Sherma, the Indian suspect.

== Reception ==
The film was awarded a Category III rating, an 18+ restriction rating in Hong Kong. Prior to the film's release, Wai Ka-Fai discussed the film's rating, saying that the rating was based on one exceptionally violent scene in the movie and, since he felt the scene was crucial to the story, he and his partner, Johnnie To, refused to delete it to get a Category IIB rating.

Mad Detective was screened at the 2007 Toronto International Film Festival's Special Presentations, a showcase for daring and artistic films with high-profile stars or directors. It also premiered at the 64th Venice International Film Festival where it was nominated for a Golden Lion Award.

=== Critical response ===
The film holds an 84% rating at Rotten Tomatoes based on 20 reviews, with an average rating of 6.6/10. Metacritic, gave the film a score of 68 out of 100 based on 7 reviews following under the "generally favorable reviews" category.

Manohla Dargis of The New York Times wrote that the film is "insanely inventive and entertaining." Ty Burr of The Boston Globe wrote that Mad Detective "is equal parts gonzo inspiration and overwrought indecision", and nicknamed the film "'The Lunatic From Kowloon.'"

=== Box office ===
Upon its release in Hong Kong, Mad Detective faced stiff competition with American films 30 Days of Night and The Heartbreak Kid. The film was released on 29 November 2007, making first place and grossing over HK$3.84 million. The film was considered a great success by its Hong Kong distributor China Star, which took it out on a midsized 30 prints. Finally, it grossed over HK$10.67 million, which is considered to be a good result for a film that received a Category III rating in Hong Kong.

=== Accolades ===
Award	Category	Winner/Nominee	Result
27th Hong Kong Film Awards	Best Screenplay	Wai Ka-Fai, Au Kin-Yee	Won
27th Hong Kong Film Awards	Best Actor	Sean Lau	Nominated
27th Hong Kong Film Awards	Best Directors	Johnnie To, Wai Ka-Fai	Nominated
27th Hong Kong Film Awards	Best Cinematography	Cheng Siu-Keung	Nominated
27th Hong Kong Film Awards	Best Film Editing	Tina Baz	Nominated
27th Hong Kong Film Awards	Best Costume and Makeup Design	Stanley Cheung	Nominated
27th Hong Kong Film Awards	Best Visual Effects	Raymond Man	Nominated
2nd Asian Film Awards	Best Screenplay	Wai Ka-Fai, Au Kin-Yee	Won
Hong Kong Film Critics Society Awards	Best Screenplay	Wai Ka-Fai, Au Kin-Yee	Won
8th Chinese Film Media Awards	Best Screenplay	Wai Ka-Fai, Au Kin-Yee	Won
64th Venice International Film Festival	Golden Lion	Johnnie To, Wai Ka-Fai	Nominated

== Distribution ==
Independent film distributor IFC Films picked up the distribution rights to Mad Detective. The studio distributed the film in theatres and through VOD on 18 July 2008, the same day as part of its First Take program.

Eureka Entertainment acquired the distribution rights for the United Kingdom, opening theatrically on 18 July 2008 at the Institute of Contemporary Arts (ICA) London and nationwide after that, with DVD and Blu-ray Disc editions released on 20 October 2008 as part of their Masters of Cinema series.

== See also ==
- Johnnie To filmography
- Tsui Po-ko
