= Milkyway Image =

Hong Kong film production company

Milkyway Image (Hong Kong) Ltd.
- Company type: Production Company
- Industry: Film
- Founded: 1996
- Founder: Johnnie To; Wai Ka-Fai
- Headquarters: Milkyway Building, 77 Hung To Road, Kwun Tong, Kowloon, Hong Kong
- Key people: Johnnie To; Wai Ka-Fai; Dennis Law; Ding Yuin-Shan; Yau Nai-Hoi; Au Kin-Yee; Yip Tin-Shing; Catherine Chan; Elaine Chu
- Website: http://www.milkywayimage.com

Milkyway Image (Hong Kong) Ltd. (Chinese: 銀河映像(香港) 有限公司) is a film production company based in Kwun Tong, Kowloon, Hong Kong. The company was established in 1996 by director Johnnie To in partnership with frequent collaborator Wai Ka-Fai. The company is known best for producing dark crime films inspired by the works of French director Jean-Pierre Melville and the film noir genre. Milkyway Image's productions have been repeatedly praised as a bold move against the commercialism found in post-handover Hong Kong cinema, and have also attracted a significant international fan base.

== Company ==
Milkyway Image is principally engaged in providing comprehensive film production services, such as pre-production, shooting, and post-production services. Milkyway Image's films are not only box office hits, but they are also produced with cost-effectiveness and efficiency, bringing film investors promising revenue.

== History ==
Johnnie To founded Milkyway Image (HK) Ltd. in 1996, together with his longtime partner Wai Ka-Fai. The early years proved to be difficult for the company, as its first productions were unsuccessful at the Hong Kong box office. Hong Kong audiences did not appreciate the bleak and intellectual tone of the films - later to become the company's signature style - which was very different from the highly commercialized productions usually present in cinemas at the time.

After more works in the same style and Johnnie To's first official directorial outing with A Hero Never Dies, neither of which managed to make a significant impact at the box office, the company shifted its focus to producing lighter films for the first time in 1999. This year saw the release of Running Out of Time, followed up by Needing You... in 2000. Both films became box-office hits and likely saved Milkyway Image from bankruptcy. Recognizing the surprising success, the company continued to produce films in a similar vein during the most critical years of the Hong Kong film industry, which - while already in decline by that time - was further wounded by the SARS crisis in 2003.

After putting out a string of successful mainstream comedies from 2000 to 2003, critics and fans who had previously been enticed by Milkyway's fresh take on the trodden triad film genre were starting to express concerns over the company's new direction. However, these concerns were quickly put to rest with the release of PTU in 2003, a film that To had worked on for 3 years and which was greatly praised by critics worldwide, eventually becoming a poster child for To's company.

In 2007, Milkyway Image split from parent company Brilliant Arts and chairman, executive director and investor Dennis Law.

== Films ==
Milkyway Image employs a unique business strategy among Hong Kong film production companies, as its output can mostly be divided into two categories: inventive and gritty action dramas which sit somewhere between genre film and arthouse cinema and often go on to achieve significant critical recognition; as well as light-hearted romantic comedies and Lunar New Year films, geared for box-office success by using popular singer-actors such as Andy Lau and Sammi Cheng. This clear distinction has sometimes been blurred thanks to productions such as Running Out of Time and Sparrow, which possess elements of both approaches and became local box-office hits as well.

The company has made a number of famous and successful films, which include Needing You..., The Mission, Exiled, My Left Eye Sees Ghosts, Election, as well as its sequel Election 2 (a.k.a. Triad Election), and Running on Karma. These films and more have been produced and/or directed by both To and/or Wai.

== Filmmakers ==
Johnnie To is the principal director and filmmaker at Milkyway Image, as the majority of Milkyway Image films have been directed by him, sometimes in collaboration with Wai Ka-Fai. However, the company also works with other established Hong Kong directors such as Lawrence Lau and nurtures young directing talent, for example To's longtime assistant director Law Wing-Cheong, writer Yau Nai-Hoi and Cheang Pou-Soi.

Writers of Milkyway Image films include Wai Ka-Fai, Szeto Kam-Yuen, Yau Nai-Hoi, Au Kin-Yee and Yip Tin-Shing. The company's writers are sometimes collectively referred to as the Milkyway Creative Team (Chinese: 銀河創作組).

== Patrick Yau controversy ==
In 1997, Johnnie To hired his former assistant director Patrick Yau to direct a number of low-budget crime films for To's then-young company: The Odd One Dies, Expect the Unexpected and The Longest Nite. However, due to a difference in opinions and To questioning Yau's ability to put his creative vision into place, he took over, directing The Odd One Dies and The Longest Nite himself. The same happened again with Expect the Unexpected. To eventually stopped working together with Yau.

While Yau is formally credited as the director of all three films, To has since gone on to confirm that he is in fact the director of the films. When asked why he still let Yau be credited as the director, he responded, "I had wanted him to succeed and be recognized as a director...Both he and Patrick Leung were my former assistant directors, and perhaps they both felt that I was supervising them. Therefore, if they left the company, it might be better for them."

== Festivals and awards ==
Milkyway Image's films have circulated around the international festival circuit. Throw Down was screened Out-of-Competition at the Venice Film Festival in 2004; Exiled was shown in Competition at the festival in 2006; Mad Detective was shown in Competition in 2007; Life Without Principle was shown in Competition in 2011.

Six of Milkyway Image's films were featured at Cannes Film Festival: Breaking News in the Out-of-Competition midnight screening in 2004; Election in Competition in 2005; Election 2 (a.k.a. Triad Election) was shown as an Out-of-Competition midnight screening in 2006; Triangle was screened as an Out-of-Competition midnight screening in 2007; Vengeance competed for the prestigious Palme D'Or in 2009; Blind Detective was screened in Out-of-Competition midnight screenings in 2013.

Sparrow was also shown in Competition at the Berlin International Film Festival in 2008.

Johnnie To was also honoured as a "Filmmaker in Focus" of the 2007 Rotterdam Film Festival.

In North America, Milkyway Image's films have been consistently screened at the Toronto International Film Festival. The Mission, Fulltime Killer, PTU, Breaking News, and Throw Down all screened between 1999 and 2005. In 2006, Election, Election 2, and Exiled were screened .

Election isn't one of the "Quentin Tarantino presents...", but Tarantino loved this film so much that he still helped the DVD release of this film in some way: his quote "The Best Film Of The Year" is on this film's United States DVD cover.

In 2007, Election 2 (a.k.a. Triad Election) and Exiled were released in the United States theatrically. In 2008, Mad Detective was given a limited release.

== Filmography ==
Year	Film	Chinese title	Director(s)	Notes
1996	Beyond Hypothermia	攝氏32度	Patrick Leung	Special example, the film lists itself as being shot by Milkyway Image, but the Milkyway Image logo does not appear.
1997	Too Many Ways to Be No. 1	一個字頭的誕生	Wai Ka-Fai	Official first film.
1997	The Odd One Dies	兩個只能活一個	Patrick Yau	Ghost-directed by Johnnie To.
1997	Final Justice	最後判決	Derek Chiu	
1997	Intruder	恐怖雞	Tsang Kan-Cheung	
1998	A Hero Never Dies	真心英雄	Johnnie To	
1998	Expect the Unexpected	非常突然	Patrick Yau	Ghost-directed by Johnnie To.
1998	The Longest Nite	暗花	Patrick Yau	Ghost-directed by Johnnie To.
1999	Where a Good Man Goes	再見阿郎	Johnnie To	
1999	Running Out of Time	暗戰	Johnnie To	
1999	The Mission	鎗火	Johnnie To	
1999	Sealed with a Kiss	甜言蜜語	Derek Chiu	
2000	Help!!!	辣手回春	Johnnie To; Wai Ka-Fai	
2000	Needing You...	孤男寡女	Johnnie To; Wai Ka-Fai	
2000	Comeuppance	天有眼	Derek Chiu	
2000	Spacked Out	無人駕駛	Lawrence Ah Mon	
2001	Fulltime Killer	全職殺手	Johnnie To; Wai Ka-Fai	
2001	Love on a Diet	瘦身男女	Johnnie To; Wai Ka-Fai	
2001	Running Out of Time 2	暗戰2	Johnnie To; Law Wing-Cheong	
2001	Gimme Gimme	愛上我吧	Lawrence Ah Mon	
2001	Wu yen	鍾無艷	Johnnie To; Wai Ka-Fai	
2001	Let's Sing Along	男歌女唱	Matt Chow	
2002	My Left Eye Sees Ghosts	我左眼見到鬼	Johnnie To; Wai Ka-Fai	
2002	Fat Choi Spirit	嚦咕嚦咕新年財	Johnnie To; Wai Ka-Fai	
2002	Second Time Around	無限復活	Jeffrey Lau	
2003	PTU	PTU	Johnnie To	Also known as PTU: Police Tactical Unit; start of the Tactical Unit series.
2003	Looking for Mister Perfect	奇逢敵手	Ringo Lam	
2003	Turn Left, Turn Right	向左走．向右走	Johnnie To; Wai Ka-Fai	
2003	Running on Karma	大隻佬	Johnnie To; Wai Ka-Fai	Also known as An Intelligent Muscle Man (大只佬/大块头有大智慧)
2003	Love for All Seasons	百年好合	Johnnie To; Wai Ka-Fai	
2004	Throw Down	柔道龍虎榜	Johnnie To	
2004	Breaking News	大事件	Johnnie To	
2004	Yesterday Once More	龍鳳鬥	Johnnie To	
2005	Election	黑社會	Johnnie To	
2006	2 Become 1	天生一對	Law Wing-Cheong	
2006	Election 2	黑社會以和為貴	Johnnie To	Also known as Triad Election
2006	Exiled	放‧逐	Johnnie To	
2007	Triangle	鐵三角	Johnnie To; Tsui Hark; Ringo Lam	
2007	Hooked on You	每當變幻時	Law Wing-Cheong	
2007	Eye in the Sky	跟蹤	Yau Nai-Hoi	
2007	Mad Detective	神探	Johnnie To; Wai Ka-Fai	
2008	Linger	蝴蝶飛	Johnnie To	
2008	Sparrow	文雀	Johnnie To	
2008	Tactical Unit – The Code	機動部隊─警例	Law Wing-Cheong	Part of the Tactical Unit series.
2008	Tactical Unit – No Way Out	機動部隊─絕路	Lawrence Ah Mon	Part of the Tactical Unit series.
2008	Tactical Unit – Human Nature	機動部隊─人性	Andy Ng	Part of the Tactical Unit series.
2009	Tactical Unit – Comrades in Arms	機動部隊─衕袍	Law Wing-Cheong	Part of the Tactical Unit series.
2009	Tactical Unit – Partners	機動部隊─伙伴	Lawrence Ah Mon	Part of the Tactical Unit series.
2009	Accident	意外	Soi Cheang	Originally titled Assassins (暗殺)
2009	Vengeance	復仇	Johnnie To	French-Hong Kong co-production
2011	Don't Go Breaking My Heart	單身男女	Johnnie To; Wai Ka-Fai	
2011	Punished	報應	Law Wing-cheong	
2011	Life Without Principle	奪命金	Johnnie To	
2012	Romancing in Thin Air	高海拔之戀II	Johnnie To	
2012	Motorway	車手	Soi Cheang	
2012	Drug War	毒戰	Johnnie To	
2013	Blind Detective	盲探	Johnnie To	
2013	A Complicated Story	一個複雜故事	Kiwi Chow	
2014	Don't Go Breaking My Heart 2	單身男女2	Johnnie To	
2015	Office	華麗上班族	Johnnie To	
2016	Trivisa	樹大招風	Frank Hui; Jevons Au; Vicky Wong	
2016	Three	三人行	Johnnie To	
2019	Chasing Dream	我的拳王男友	Johnnie To	
2022	Septet: The Story of Hong Kong	七人樂隊	Johnnie To, Yuen Wo-ping, Sammo Hung, Patrick Tam, Ann Hui, Ringo Lam, Tsui Hark	
2023	Mad Fate	命案	Soi Cheang	

=== TV Series ===
- What If (2025)
