= Andy Lau filmography =

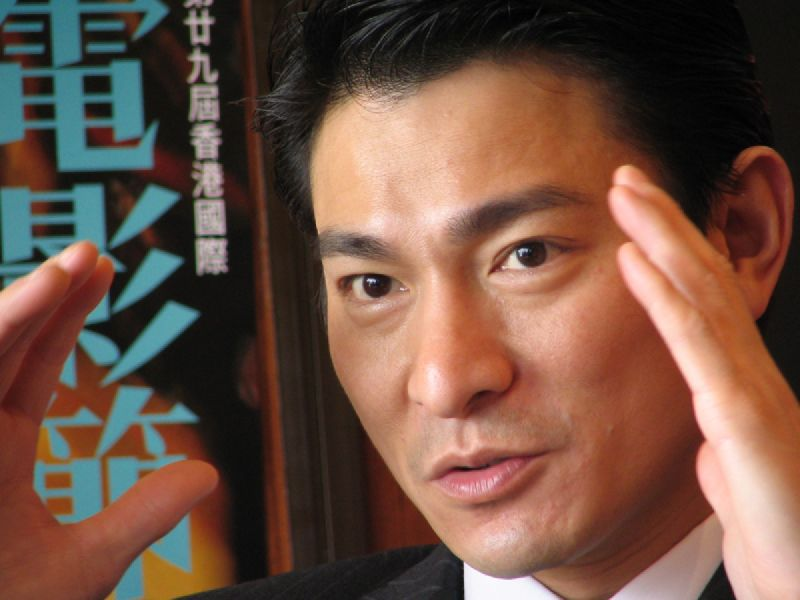
- Lau being interviewed at the 29th Hong Kong International Film Festival (2005)
- Film: 188
- Television series: 28

This is the filmography of Hong Kong singer, actor and film producer Andy Lau.

== Career summary ==
Lau made his film acting debut in a supporting role the 1981 film, Once Upon a Rainbow and his television acting debut in an episode of the 1981 RTHK series, Til We Meet Again, in the leading role of "Dragon". The following year, Lau played a major role in director Ann Hui's Boat People, which earned him a Hong Kong Film Award for Best New Performer nomination, as well as starring in the TVB series, The Emissary, which shot him to stardom. In 1983, Lau starred as "Yeung Kuo" in The Return of the Condor Heroes, which was the top rated TV series of the year in Hong Kong, further boosting his popularity throughout Asia, and landed him the opportunity to star in his first leading film role in the action drama film, On the Wrong Track in the same year. Lau left TVB in 1985 to fully concentrate in his film career and starring in multiple box office hits before earning his first Hong Kong Film Award for Best Actor nomination for his role in the 1988 film, As Tears Go By, directed by Wong Kar-wai. In 1989 alone, Lau appeared in 16 films, including the top-grossing blockbuster of the year, God of Gamblers, as "Michael "Dagger" Chan", a role he would reprise in the sequel the following year.

In 1991, Lau established his own production company, Teamwork Motion Pictures, with its first production being the martial arts film, Saviour of the Soul, which Lau starred as a mercenary in the same year, being a critical and commercial success. Throughout the 1990s, Lau starred in over 50 films which include his signature role as "Wah Dee" in 1990's A Moment of Romance, the Lee Rock film series (1991) as real life corrupt officer Lui Lok, the 1992 wuxia film, Moon Warriors, the 1995 biker film, Full Throttle and the 1999 Johnnie To-directed action thriller film, Running Out of Time, which won him his first Hong Kong Film Award for Best Actor. In 1997, Lau also produced the Fruit Chan-directed drama film, Made in Hong Kong, which won the Hong Kong Film Award for Best Film.

In 2000, Lau starred as a Muay thai fighter in his 100th film, A Fighter's Blues, in which he also produced, and netted him the Golden Bauhinia Awards for Best Actor. In 2002, he starred as triad mole Lau Kin-ming in the highly acclaimed crime thriller, Infernal Affairs, a film considered to have "single-handedly revived the moribund Hong Kong film industry." Infernal Affairs grossed HK$55,057,176 at the Hong Kong box office, making it Lau's highest-grossing film in Hong Kong to date, and also earned Lau a Best Actor nomination both at the Hong Kong Film Awards and at the Golden Horse Awards. The following year, Lau starred in the sequel, Infernal Affairs III, which won him the Golden Horse Award for Best Leading Actor, and in the Buddhism-themed action thriller, Running on Karma, winning him his second Hong Kong Film Award for Best Actor. The same year, Lau directed and starred in his only directorial feature to date, the musical short Love Under the Sun to raise awareness about AIDS and dispel common misconceptions regarding its contagiousness. In 2004, Lau renamed his company, Teamwork Motion Pictures, to Focus Group Holdings Limited, with its first film production being the crime film, Jiang Hu, which he also produced and starred as a triad leader who is a target of an assassination hit. The same year, Lau also made his first venture in the Mainland Chinese film market, starring in the wuxia film, House of Flying Daggers, which premiered at the 2004 Cannes Film Festival, and the action drama A World without Thieves, with the two films being the second and third-highest-grossing films of the year at the Chinese box office respectively. In 2007, he played a drug lord in the crime drama film, Protégé, which won him the Hong Kong Film Award for Best Supporting Actor.

In 2010, Lau played Di Renjie in Tsui Hark's Detective Dee and the Mystery of the Phantom Flame, which was nominated for the Golden Lion at the 2010 Venice Film Festival. The following year, he starred in Ann Hui 's A Simple Life, which won four awards at the 68th Venice Film Festival, as well as earning his third Hong Kong Film Award for Best Actor and second Golden Horse Award for Best Leading Actor. In 2013, Lau produced and starred as morally-conflicted cop in the high-octane action film, Firestorm, which was also the first 3D film production he worked on. In 2016, Lau starred in his first Hollywood film, The Great Wall. In 2017, Lau produced and starred as a righteous bomb disposal officer in Shock Wave, which earned him another Best Actor nomination for at the 27th Hong Kong Film Awards. He returned in 2020 in the thematic sequel, Shock Wave 2, playing a different character greatly contrasting his role from its predecessor, and the film has grossed US$226.4 million worldwide, making it Lau's highest-grossing film at the global box office to date and was also the tenth-highest-grossing film of 2020.

Lau has received the "No.1 Box office Actor 1985–2005" award of Hong Kong in 2005, yielding a box office total of HK$1.7 billion for shooting 108 films in that period and was also awarded the "Nielsen Box Office Star of Asia" award by the Nielsen Company (ACNielsen) in 2007. Lau has been honored at different international film festivals for his achievements and contributions to the film industry, such as winning the "Asian Filmmaker of the Year" award at the 2006 Busan International Film Festival and receiving a Special Tribute award at 2023 Toronto International Film Festival where his satirical comedy film, The Movie Emperor, made its world premiere.

== Film ==
Year	Title	Credited as		Role	Notes	Ref.
Year	Title	Actor	Producer	Role	Notes	Ref.
1982	Once Upon a Rainbow	Yes	No	Trainee	Cameo	
1982	Boat People	Yes	No	To Minh		
1983	On the Wrong Track	Yes	No	Paul Chan		
1983	The Home at Hong Kong	Yes	No	Alan Wong		
1984	Everlasting Love	Yes	No	Eric		
1984	Shanghai 13	Yes	No	Guan Wei	Cameo	
1985	The Unwritten Law	Yes	No	Raymond Lau		
1985	Twinkle, Twinkle Lucky Stars	Yes	No	Associate of Muscles	Cameo	
1986	The Magic Crystal	Yes	No	Andy Lo		
1986	Lucky Stars Go Places	Yes	No	Lambo		
1987	Rich and Famous	Yes	No	Lam Ting-kwok		
1987	Sworn Brothers	Yes	No	Lam Ting-yat		
1987	Tragic Hero	Yes	No	Lam Ting-kwok		
1988	As Tears Go By	Yes	No	Wah		
1988	The Crazy Companies	Yes	No	Tsui Ting-kwai		
1988	The Crazy Companies II	Yes	No	Tsui Ting-kwai		
1988	The Dragon Family	Yes	No	Lung Ka-wah		
1988	In the Blood	Yes	No	Wah		
1988	Lai Shi, China's Last Eunuch	Yes	No	Han Ming	Cameo	
1988	The Romancing Star II	Yes	No	Lau Pei		
1988	Three Against the World	Yes	No	Charlie Chan		
1988	The Truth	Yes	No	Raymond Lau		
1988	Walk on Fire	Yes	No	Lam Kwok-wah		
1989	Bloody Brotherhood	Yes	No	Cheung Ka-wah		
1989	Casino Raiders	Yes	No	Crab Chan		
1989	China White	Yes	No	Roast Chicken		
1989	City Kids 1989	Yes	No	Sas		
1989	Crocodile Hunter	Yes	No	Happy Chiu		
1989	The First Time Is the Last Time	Yes	No	Yung		
1989	God of Gamblers	Yes	No	Michael "Dagger" Chan / Little Knife		
1989	Little Cop	Yes	No	Himself	Cameo	
1989	Long Arm of the Law Part 3	Yes	No	Lee Cheung-kong		
1989	News Attack	Yes	No	Turbo		
1989	Perfect Match	Yes	No	Lok Ka-sing		
1989	Proud and Confident	Yes	No	Lee Kin-wah		
1989	The Romancing Star III	Yes	No	Lau Pei		
1989	Runaway Blues	Yes	No	Lam Kong		
1989	Stars and Roses	Yes	No	Lau Kai-cho		
1989	The Truth - Final Episode	Yes	No	Raymond Lau		
1990	Days of Being Wild	Yes	No	Tide		
1990	Dragon in Jail	Yes	No	Henry Lau		
1990	The Fortune Code	Yes	No	Wah Ying-hung		
1990	Gangland Odyssey	Yes	No	Kit		
1990	God of Gamblers II	Yes	No	Michael "Dagger" Chan / Little Knife		
1990	A Home Too Far	Yes	No	Little Tu / Hua Chung-hsing		
1990	Island of Fire	Yes	No	Iron Ball		
1990	Kawashima Yoshiko	Yes	No	Fook / Cloud		
1990	Kung Fu VS Acrobatic	Yes	No	Mo Tak-fai		
1990	A Moment of Romance	Yes	No	Wah Dee		
1990	No Risk, No Gain	Yes	No	Big Dee		
1990	Return Engagement	Yes	No	Wah		
1991	The Banquet	Yes	No	Himself	Cameo	
1991	Casino Raiders II	Yes	No	Chicken Feet		
1991	Dances with Dragon	Yes	No	Lung Ka-chun		
1991	Don't Fool Me	Yes	No	Hero Wah		
1991	Hong Kong Godfather	Yes	No	York Koo		
1991	The Last Blood	Yes	No	Big B		
1991	Lee Rock	Yes	No	Lee Rock		
1991	Lee Rock II	Yes	No	Lee Rock		
1991	Saviour of the Soul	Yes	Executive	Ching		
1991	The Tigers	Yes	No	Lau Chi-ming		
1991	Tricky Brains	Yes	No	Che Man-kit		
1991	Zodiac Killers	Yes	No	Ben Lee		
1992	Casino Tycoon	Yes	No	Benny Ho		
1992	Casino Tycoon 2	Yes	No	Benny Ho		
1992	Gameboy Kids	Yes	Executive	Yip Sin-man / Wong Kau-tai		
1992	Gun n' Rose	Yes	No	Andy		
1992	Handsome Siblings	Yes	No	Fishy		
1992	Moon Warriors	Yes	Executive	Fei		
1992	The Prince of Temple Street	Yes	No	Prince Twelve / Lee Rock		
1992	Saviour of the Soul II	Yes	Executive	Ching Yan		
1992	The Sting	Yes	No	Simon Tam		
1992	What a Hero!	Yes	No	Yuen Tak-wah		
1993	Days of Tomorrow	Yes	Executive	Fong Tak-sing		
1993	Future Cops	Yes	No	Ti Man		
1993	Come Fly the Dragon	Yes	No	Chow Chun-kit		
1993	Perfect Exchange	Yes	No	Mandy Chin		
1994	Drunken Master II	Yes	No	Chang Hsueh-liang	Cameo	
1994	Drunken Master III	Yes	No	Yeung Kwan		
1994	A Taste of Killing and Romance	Yes	No	Ko Sau		
1994	The Three Swordsmen	Yes	No	Siu Sam-siu		
1994	Tian Di	Yes	Yes	Cheung Yat-pang		
1995	The Adventurers	Yes	No	Wai Lok-yan		
1995	Full Throttle	Yes	No	Joe		
1995	Pocahontas	Yes	No	John Smith (voice)		
1996	What a Wonderful World	Yes	No	San Chung-wah		
1996	A Moment of Romance III	Yes	No	Lau Tin-wai		
1996	Shanghai Grand	Yes	No	Ting Lik		
1996	Thanks for Your Love	Yes	Yes	Wah		
1997	Armageddon	Yes	No	Dr. Tak Ken		
1997	Cause We Are So Young	Yes	No	Man at outdoor cafe	Cameo	
1997	Made in Hong Kong	No	Yes	—		
1997	Island of Greed	Yes	No	Fong Kwok-fai		
1998	A True Mob Story	Yes	No	Wai Kat-cheung / Cheung Dee		
1998	The Conman	Yes	No	King		
1998	The Longest Summer	No	Yes	—		
1999	Fascination Amour	Yes	No	Albert Lai		
1999	Prince Charming	Yes	No	Wah Dee		
1999	The Conmen in Vegas	Yes	No	King		
1999	Century of the Dragon	Yes	No	Lung Yat-fei / Fei-lung		
1999	Running Out of Time	Yes	No	Cheung Wah		
2000	The Duel	Yes	No	Yeh Cool Son		
2000	Needing You...	Yes	No	Andy Cheung		
2000	A Fighter's Blues	Yes	Yes	Mang Fu		
2001	Love on a Diet	Yes	No	Fatso		
2001	Fulltime Killer	Yes	Yes	Lok Tok-wah		
2001	Dance of a Dream	Yes	Yes	Namson Lau		
2002	Fat Choi Spirit	Yes	No	Andy		
2002	The Wesley's Mysterious File	Yes	No	Wesley		
2002	Infernal Affairs	Yes	No	Lau Kin-ming		
2002	Golden Chicken	Yes	No	Himself	Cameo	
2002	Black Mask 2: City of Masks	Yes	No	Prophet (voice)	Narrator	
2003	Love Under the Sun	Yes	No	Bellhop captain	Short film; also director	
2003	Cat and Mouse	Yes	No	Zhan Zhao		
2003	Give Them a Chance	Yes	No	Himself	Cameo	
2003	Running on Karma	Yes	No	Big		
2003	Infernal Affairs III	Yes	No	Lau Kin-ming		
2003	Golden Chicken 2	Yes	No	Himself	Cameo	
2004	Magic Kitchen	Yes	No	Chuen Yao	Guest appearance	
2004	Jiang Hu	Yes	Yes	Hung Yan-chau		
2004	McDull, Prince de la Bun	Yes	No	McBing (voice)		
2004	House of Flying Daggers	Yes	No	Captain Leo		
2004	Yesterday Once More	Yes	No	Mr. Thief		
2004	A World Without Thieves	Yes	No	Wang Bo		
2005	Wait 'Til You're Older	Yes	No	Chan Chi-kwong		
2005	The Shoe Fairy	Yes	Yes	Narrator (voice)		
2005	All About Love	Yes	Executive	Dr. Ko / Derek Hui		
2006	I'll Call You	Yes	Yes	Muscle Guy / Warden 333	Cameo	
2006	My Mother is a Belly Dancer	Yes	Yes	Adili	Cameo	
2006	A Battle of Wits	Yes	No	Ge Li		
2006	Rain Dogs	No	Executive	—		
2006	Crazy Stone	No	Executive	—		
2007	Protégé	Yes	No	Lam Kwan		
2007	Brothers	Yes	Yes	Chief Inspector Lau		
2007	The Warlords	Yes	No	Zhao Erhu		
2008	Three Kingdoms: Resurrection of the Dragon	Yes	No	Zhao Zilong		
2009	Look for a Star	Yes	No	Sam Ching		
2009	The Founding of a Republic	Yes	No	Yu Jishi	Cameo	
2010	Future X-Cops	Yes	No	Kidd Zhou		
2010	Detective Dee and the Mystery of the Phantom Flame	Yes	No	Di Renjie		
2010	Gallants	No	Executive	—		
2011	Shaolin	Yes	No	Hou Jie		
2011	What Women Want	Yes	Executive	Sun Zigang		
2011	The Founding of a Party	Yes	No	Cai E	Cameo	
2011	A Simple Life	Yes	Executive	Roger Leung		
2012	Cold War	Yes	No	Philip Luk	Cameo	
2013	Switch	Yes	No	Xiao Jinhan		
2013	Blind Detective	Yes	No	Johnston Chong		
2013	Singing When We're Young	No	Yes	—		
2013	Firestorm	Yes	Yes	Lui Ming-chit		
2014	Golden Chicken 3	Yes	No	Himself	Cameo	
2015	From Vegas to Macau II	Yes	No	Michael "Dagger" Chan / Little Knife	Mid-credits cameo	
2015	Lost and Love	Yes	No	Lei Zekuan		
2015	Saving Mr. Wu	Yes	No	Mr. Wu		
2015	Our Times	Yes	No	Himself	Cameo	
2016	The Bodyguard	Yes	Yes	Li Zheng-jiu		
2016	From Vegas to Macau III	Yes	No	Michael "Dagger" Chan / Little Knife		
2016	Mission Milano	Yes	Yes	Sampan Hung		
2016	The Great Wall	Yes	No	Strategist Wang		
2016	Railroad Tigers	Yes	No	Little boy's father	Cameo	
2017	Shock Wave	Yes	Yes	Cheung Choi-san		
2017	The Adventurers	Yes	Yes	Dan Cheung		
2017	Chasing the Dragon	Yes	Yes	Lee Rock		
2019	The White Storm 2: Drug Lords	Yes	Yes	Yu Shun-tin		
2019	Fagara	Yes	No	Kwok Tin-yan	Cameo	
2020	Find Your Voice	Yes	Yes	Joseph Yim		
2020	Shock Wave 2	Yes	Yes	Poon Sing-fung		
2021	Detective Chinatown 3	Yes	No	Q	Cameo	
2021	Endgame	Yes	Yes	Zhou Quan		
2023	The Wandering Earth 2	Yes	No	Tu Hengyu		
2023	Red Line	Yes	No	Hell's Cat owner	Cameo	
2023	The Movie Emperor	Yes	Executive	Dany Lau		
2023	Moscow Mission	Yes	Yes	Vasily		
2023	I Did It My Way	Yes	Yes	George Lam		
2023	The Goldfinger	Yes	No	Lau Kai-yuen		
2024	Peg O' My Heart	Yes	No	Dr. Vincent Ching	Cameo	
2024	Crisis Negotiators	Yes	Yes	Chan Tai-loi	Cameo	
2024	High Forces	Yes	Yes	Gao Haojun		
2024	Cesium Fallout	Yes	Yes	Simon Fan		
2025	A Gilded Game	Yes	Yes	Todd Cheung		
2025	The Lychee Road	Yes	No	Yang Guozhong	Cameo	
TBA	Made In Yiwu	Yes	No	Zhu Aliang		
TBA	Hong Kong Land	Yes	Yes	Liu Kin		
TBA	Angels of the Pandemic	Yes	Yes	Doctor		
TBA	Raging Havoc	Yes	Yes	Fong Wing-chau		
TBA	Sacred Seven	Yes	Yes	Sun Wukong		
TBA	Shock Wave 3	Yes	Yes			

== Television series ==
Year	English title	Chinese title	Role	Notes	Ref.
1981	Till' We Meet Again	江湖再見	Lung		
1981	Hong Kong'81	香港八一	Ngai Kim-sing		
1981	The Lonely Hunter	過客	Student		
1981	Double Fantasies	無雙譜			
1981	Two People Three Feet	二人三足	Waiter		
1981	The Young Heroes of Shaolin	英雄出少年	Shaolin disciple		
1981	The Shell Game	千王群英會	Lung's bodyguard		
1982	Kid Troupe	戲班小子	Wan Hoi		
1982	The Restless Trio	花艇小英雄	Chin Yat-tim		
1982	The Legend of Master So	蘇乞兒	Man Tit-ho		
1982	The Emissary	獵鷹	Kong Tai-wai		
1983	My Way	奔向太陽	Lee Chi-ho		
1983	The Old Miao Myth	老洞	Tse Seung-cho		
1983	Crossroads: A Decision	臨歧：決	Ma Yat-ning		
1983	The Return of The Condor Heroes	神鵰俠侶	Yeung Kuo		
1984	The Duke of Mount Deer	鹿鼎記	Emperor Hong-hei		
1984	The Other Side of the Horizon	魔域桃源	Fu Ching-wan		
1984	The Return of Wong Fei Hung	寶芝林	Lam Sai-wing		
1985	Hong Kong '85	香港八五	Ngai Kim-sing		
1985	The Last Performance	鼓舞	Yip Chin-lung		
1985	Take Care, Your Highness!	皇上保重	Emperor Kin-lung		
1985	The Yang's Saga	楊家將	Yeung Yin-chiu		
1986	The Heavenly Swordsman and the Spoiled	聖劍天驕	Kei Chun		
1986	Heir to the Throne Is...	真命天子	Koon Chung-yuen		
1988	Sky Wolf's Calmity	天狼劫	Pak Lung		
1992	Modern Love Story	現代愛情戀曲	Wai / Cheung (2 roles)		
1992	The Thief of Time	羣星會	Yeung Kuo	Cameo appearance	
2018	The Trading Floor	東方華爾街		Producer only	
