= Focus Group Holdings Limited =

- Type: Holding company
- Industry: Entertainment
- Predecessor: Teamwork Corporation Limited
- Founded: 2004 in Hong Kong
- Founder: Andy Lau
- Headquarters: Unit A, 9/F, Billion Cebtre, 1 Wang Kwong Road, Kowloon Bay, Kowloon, Hong Kong
- Area served: Asia
- Key people: Andy Lau
- Products: Film; Music
- Services: Film production and distribution Sound recording production Artiste management
- Divisions: see list
- Website: www.focusgroup.cc

Focus Group Holdings Limited
- Traditional Chinese: 映藝集團控股有限公司
- Simplified Chinese: 映艺集团控股有限公司
Transcriptions
Yue: Cantonese
- Jyutping: Jing2 Ngai6 Zaap3 Tyun4 Hung3 Gu2 Jau2 Haan6 Gung1 Si1

Focus Group Holdings Limited ("Focus Group"; Chinese: 映藝集團控股有限公司), is a company formed by Andy Lau Tak-wah, a popular Hong Kong actor and singer. It is engaged in the film and artist management business.

The company was originally named Teamwork Motion Pictures (天幕製作有限公司). However, disagreements and subsequent legal proceedings arose between Andy Lau and another joint owner of the company. After the settlement of the disputes, Andy renamed the company to its current name in 2004 in order to give it a fresh start.

The notable films produced by the company when it was named Team Work were the critically acclaimed features Made in Hong Kong in 1997 and The Longest Summer in 1998, both films directed by Fruit Chan.

Focus Films will be producing a remake of the classic 1967 action film Story of a Discharged Prisoner, (the film which was later remade into John Woo's A Better Tomorrow) at an estimated cost of US$5 million. Lau will star in the film which will be directed by Stephen Fung.

In December 2006, executives Daniel Yu and Lorna Tee left their positions at Focus Films.

== Scope of operations ==
Focus Group acts as a holding company for a number of companies specializing in different areas. The major companies under the control and ownership of Focus Group are:

- Focus Films Limited - It deals with the production and distribution of films.
- Topman Global Limited - It is involved with artiste management.
- Topman Holdings Limited - It is formed to hold the intellectual property rights of Focus Group and is also involved with the management various of the group's companies websites.
- Andy World Club Limited - It is involved with the organization of functions and activities for the fans of Andy Lau.
- Focus Music Limited - The company, formerly known as Ever Song Limited, is involved with the production of song and music albums.
- Andox Limited - It is the owner of and in control of the intellectual property rights, trademarks, and of all interests in using the characters of "Andox" & "Box".
- Focus Theatre Limited - It offers diverse performing arts activities to the public.
- Focus Entertainment Limited - a live entertainment organizer and producer which offers a diverse range of live performance programmes spanning from live concerts from all music genres, family shows and global cultural events for all ages.
- Focus Television Production Limited - It is responsible for TV programme production, a wide choice of programmes ranging from drama, documentaries, travelogue, and infotainment.
- Infinitus Entertainment Limited - It engages in film production, film project management and film and television project investment.
- Focus Licensing Limited - an operating arm that devotes in Brand Management and Licensing.

== Films ==
The films produced and distributed by the company under the previous name, Teamwork Motion Pictures are:

- Give Them a Chance (給他們一個機會) (2003)
- The Runaway Pistol (走火槍) (2002)
- Fulltime Killer (全職殺手) (2001)
- Dance of a Dream (愛君如夢) (2001)
- A Fighter's Blues (阿虎) (2000)
- The Longest Summer (去年煙花特別多) (1998)
- Made in Hong Kong (香港製造) (1997)
- Thanks for Your Love (1/2次同床) (1996)
- Tian Di (天與地) (1994)
- Women on the Run (赤裸狂奔) (1993)
- Days of Tomorrow (天長地久) (1993)
- Moon Warriors (戰神傳說) (1992)
- Saviour of the Soul II (92神雕俠侶之痴心情長劍) (1992)
- Never-Ending Summer (吳三桂與陳圓圓) (1992)
- Gameboy Kids (機Boy小子之真假威龍) (1992)
- Saviour of the Soul (91神雕俠侶) (1991)

The films produced and distributed by the company under Focus Films are:

- A Gilded Game (獵金•遊戲) (2025)
- High Forces (危機航綫) (2024)
- I Did It My Way (潛行) (2023)
- Shock Wave 2 (拆彈專家2) (2020)
- The White Storm 2: Drug Lords (掃毒2天地對決) (2019)
- The Bodyguard (特工爺爺) (2016)
- Our Times (我的少女時代) (2015)
- Lost and Love (失孤) (2015)
- My Voice, My Life (爭氣) (2014)
- Firestorm (風暴) (2013)
- A Simple Life (桃姐) (2012)
- What Women Want (我知女人心) (2011)
- Gallants (打擂台) (2010)
- Brothers (兄弟) (2007)
- Invisible Waves (2006) co-production
- I'll Call You (得閒飲茶) (2006)
- Love Story (愛情故事) (2006)
- Rain Dogs (太陽雨) (2006)
- Crazy Stone (瘋狂的石頭) (2006)
- My Mother is a Belly Dancer (師奶唔易做) (2006)
- After This Our Exile (父子) (2006)
- The Shoe Fairy (人魚朵朵) (2005)
- A Side, B side, Seaside (17歲的夏天) (2005)
- All About Love (再説一次我愛你) (2005)
- A World Without Thieves (天下無賊) (2004)
- Jiang Hu (江湖) (2004)

The films produced and distributed by the company under Infinitus Entertainment are:

- I Did It My Way (潛行) (2023)
- Shock Wave 2 (拆彈專家2) (2020)
- Find Your Voice (熱血合唱團) (2020)
- Sangkar (2019)
- Hantu Kak Limah (2018)
- Chasing the Dragon (追龍) (2017)
- The Adventurers (俠盜聯盟) (2017)
- J Revolusi (2017), co-produced with Malaysian studio Grand Brilliance Sdn Bhd.
- Shock Wave (拆彈專家) (2017)
- Mission Milano (偷天特務) (2016)
- From Vegas to Macau III (賭城風雲III) (2016)

== Television series ==
The television series produced by the company under Focus Television Production are

- The Trading Floor (東方華爾街) (2018)

== Music albums ==
The music album released under the label, Ever Music are

- 2004 Coffee or Tea of Andy Lau
- 2004 Andy Lau Vision Tour 2004 of Andy Lau

The music album released under the label, Focus Music are

- 2006 Voice CD+DVD Limited Birthday Celebration Version 27/09/06 of Andy Lau
- 2006 Voice of Andy Lau
- 2005 All About Love of Andy Lau
- 2005 Best of My Love of Andy Lau

== See also ==
- List of record labels
