= Gordon Lam =

Hong Kong actor and screenwriter (born 1967)

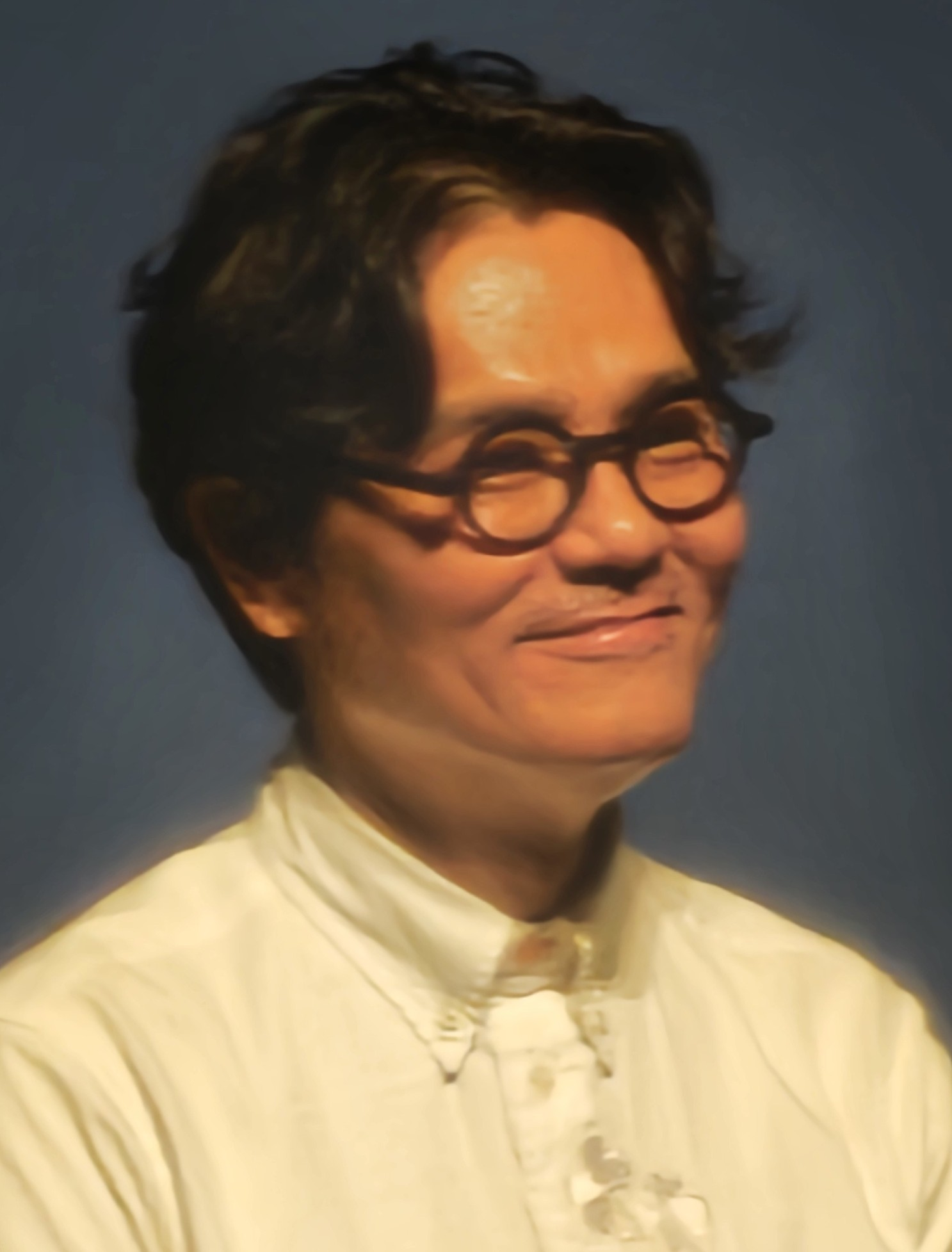
- Lam in 2026
- Born: 21 September 1967 (age 58); Kowloon City, Kowloon, British Hong Kong
- Occupations: Actor, film producer, screenwriter
- Years active: 1988–present
- Relatives: Teresa Ha (adoptive mother)
- Awards: Hong Kong Film Awards – Best Film; 2011 Gallants; Best Actor; 2017 Trivisa New York Asian Film Festival – Variety Star Asia Award; 2021 Hong Kong Film Critics Society Awards – Best Film; 2010 Gallants; Best Actor; 2016 Trivisa TVB Anniversary Awards – Best On-Screen Couple; 1997 Time Before Time; My Favourite Television Character; 2000 Plain Love II

Chinese name
- Traditional Chinese: 林家棟
- Simplified Chinese: 林家栋
- Hanyu Pinyin: Lín Jiādòng
- Jyutping: lam4 gaa1 dung6

Signature
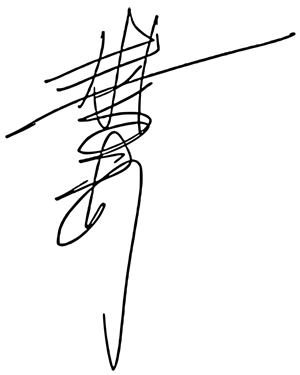

Gordon Lam Ka-tung (林家棟; born 21 September 1967) is a Hong Kong actor, film producer and screenwriter. Initially known for his supporting roles in films directed by Andrew Lau and Johnnie To, Lam eventually became a lead actor in the Hong Kong film industry, appearing in the 2013 box-office hit Firestorm and the Hong Kong Film Award-winning 2016 film Trivisa, which also netted him the Hong Kong Film Award for Best Actor.

== Early life ==
Lam was born at South Wall Road in Kowloon City, He graduated from TVB's 15th Artist Training Class in 1988. For the next seven to eight years, he was no more than an extra in most television productions. It wasn't until Lam's impersonation of Jacky Cheung that he began to catch the attention of Hong Kong audiences.

Lam was soon offered more supporting roles and the first TV series he starred in, Time Before Time, was one of the most popular serials of 1997. At that time, he has had the opportunity to appear in films as well, with small roles in Gen-X Cops (1999) and The Kid (1999). After leaving TVB in 2001, Lam became a contracted artiste under Andy Lau's Topman Global, and began to fully concentrate on his film career. Lam appeared in supporting roles in a number of Lau's films such as Dance of a Dream (2001), Infernal Affairs (2002), Jiang Hu (2004), Yesterday Once More (2004) and Wait 'til You're Older (2005). Some of his other known film appearances include Johnnie To's Election film series (2005-2006), Exiled (2006) and Mad Detective (2007).

In 2009, Lam made his debut as a producer for Gallants, which won the Hong Kong Film Award for Best Film as well as the Hong Kong Film Critics Society Awards for Best Film. Lam went on to producer the 2015 film, Get Outta Here, which he also wrote the story for.

In 2013, Lam played a subsidiary role in Lau's 2013 film, Firestorm, which was a box office success, and subsequently led him to many leading film role offers.

In 2017, Lam won the Hong Kong Film Award for Best Actor for his performance in as Kwai Ching-hung Trivisa (2016), based on real life notorious Hong Kong mobster Kwai Ping-hung. His performance also won him the Hong Kong Film Critics Society Awards for Best Actor and the Hong Kong Film Directors' Guild Award for Best Actor.

On 6 August 2021, Lam received the Variety Star Asia Award at the 20th New York Asian Film Festival.

== Filmography ==
=== Film ===
==== Actor ====
Year	Title	Role	Notes
1992	Hero of the Beggars		
1994	The Modern Love		
1995	Daze Raper		
1995	Fatal Assignment		
1996	Hong Kong Showgirls		
1996	The Eighth		
1997	Up for the Rising Sun	Yee Gwan Shu	
1999	The Kid		
1999	Gen-X Cops	Dinosaur	
2000	Deathnet.com	Inspector Yip	
2001	Love Me, Love My Money	Tom	
2001	Dance of a Dream	Faye Wong Yat-fei	Nominated – Hong Kong Film Award for Best Supporting Actor
2002	Infernal Affairs	Inspector B	
2003	Infernal Affairs III	Inspector B	
2003	Transfiguration of Life		
2003	Twilight Tubes Part III		
2004	A World Without Thieves	Four-Eyes	
2004	Yesterday Once More	Insurance surveyor	
2004	Jiang Hu	Shing	
2004	A-1	Tong	
2005	Election	Kun	
2005	Wait 'Til You're Older		
2005	Bar Paradise		
2006	Super Kid		
2006	I'll Call You		
2006	Election 2	Kun	
2006	Rob-B-Hood	Paramedic (Cameo Appearance)	
2006	2 Become 1		
2006	My Mother is a Belly Dancer		
2006	Exiled	Boss Keung	
2007	Brothers	Sergeant Lam Sun	
2007	Triangle	Corrupt Cop Wen	
2007	Exodus		
2007	Hooked on You		
2007	Mad Detective	Ko Chi-Wai	
2007	Who's Next		
2007	Beauty and the 7 Beasts		
2007	Two Stupid Eggs		
2008	Sparrow		
2008	Chaos	Mickey Szeto	
2008	Ip Man	Inspector Li Chiu	Nominated – Hong Kong Film Award for Best Supporting Actor
2008	Ballistic		
2008	Tactical Unit: Human Nature	Loan Shark Chan Yiu-hung	
2009	The First 7th Night	Map King	
2009	Vengeance	Yiu Ka-chu	
2010	72 Tenants of Prosperity	Prince Bing	Cameo
2010	The Child's Eye		
2011	Let's Go!		
2012	Motorway	HKPD Commander Chong	
2012	Cold War	HKPD Senior Assistant Commissioner Albert C.L Kwong	Nominated – Hong Kong Film Award for Best Supporting Actor
2013	Paper Moon		
2013	Drug War	East Lee	
2013	Blind Detective		
2013	Tales from the Dark 2		
2013	Firestorm	Tao Shing-bong	
2014	Overheard 3	Paul	
2014	Z Storm	Wong Man-ban	
2015	Crazy New Year’s Eve		
2015	An Inspector Calls	Tim Kau	
2015	Midnight Garage		
2015	Ulterior Motive	Yao Jie	
2015	The Vanished Murderer	Professor Hua	
2016	Trivisa	Kwai Ching-hung	Won – Hong Kong Film Award for Best Actor; Won – Hong Kong Film Critics Society Awards for Best Actor; Won – Hong Kong Film Directors' Guild Award for Best Actor
2016	Nessun Dorma	Vincent Lee	
2016	The Moment	Chan Ka-fai	
2016	Buddy Cops		
2016	Cherry Returns		
2017	Paradox	Cheng Hon-sau	Nominated – Hong Kong Film Award for Best Supporting Actor
2017	The Brink	Chan	
2017	The Sleep Curse	Chow Fuk	
2017	Dealer/Healer	La Ba	
2017	Always Be With You	Chi-keung	
2017	Love Forever	Lung Ho	
2019	P Storm	Wong Man-ban	
2019	Chasing the Dragon II: Wild Wild Bunch	Doc	
2019	The White Storm 2: Drug Lords	Secretary for Justice of Hong Kong	
2019	Nobody Nose		
2020	Hand Rolled Cigarette	Kwan Chiu	Nominated – Hong Kong Film Award for Best Actor; Nominated – Golden Horse Award for Best Leading Actor
2021	Once Upon a Time in Hong Kong	Nash Pak	
2021	Limbo	Cham Lau	Nominated – Hong Kong Film Award for Best Actor; Nominated – Golden Horse Award for Best Leading Actor
2021	All U Need Is Love		
2021	Anita	Alfredo So	
2022	Cyber Heist	Chan Ming-chi	
2023	Mad Fate	Fortune telling master	
2023	I Did It My Way	Sau Ho	
2024	Rob N Roll		
TBD	Beyond the Sin		
TBD	The Strangled Truth		
TBD	Where All Roads End		
TBD	When It All Begins		
TBD	An Officer and a Panderer		
TBD	Un Coevr D'Artichaut		

==== Producer ====
Year	Title	Notes
2010	Gallants	Won – Hong Kong Film Award for Best Film; Won – Hong Kong Film Critics Society Awards for Best Film
2015	Get Outta Here	
TBD	The Strangled Truth	
TBD	When All Roads End	
TBD	When It All Begins	
TBD	Un Coevr D'Artichaut	

==== Writer ====
Year	Title	Notes
2015	Get Outta Here	Story writer
TBD	The Strangled Truth	Screenwriter
TBD	When All Roads Ends	Screenwriter
TBD	Un Coevr D'Artichaut	Screenwriter

=== TV series ===
Year	Title	Role	Notes
1988	The Saga of the Lost Kingdom	Soldier	
1988	Twilight of a Nation	Soldier	
1989	Greed		
1989	Two of a Kind		
1989	The Black Sabre	Jewellery Seller (Episode 19)	
1989	The Justice of Life		
1989	Song Bird		
1989	The Final Combat	Guard	
1990	Blood of Good and Evil		
1990	Beyond Trust		
1990	Where I Belong		
1990	The Challenge of Life		
1990	Cherished Moments		
1991	The Confidence Men		
1991	Beside the Seaside, Beside the Sea		
1991	Yuppies on the Move		
1991	Live for Life		
1991	A Life of His Trust		
1991	Thief of Honor		
1991	The Big Family		
1992	Tales from Beyond		
1992	The Greed of Man		
1992	The Key Man		
1992	Source of Evil		
1992	The Change of Time		
1992	File of Justice		
1993	The Legendary Ranger		
1993	The Yang's Women Warriors		
1993	The Hero from Shanghai		
1993	The Edge of Righteousness		
1993	Man of Wisdom	A Suspect	
1993	The Mystery of the Condor Hero	Chu Tsi-lau	
1994	Gentle Reflections		
1994	Shades of Darkness		
1994	The Ching Emperor		
1994	The Intangible Truth		
1994	Love is Blind		
1994	ICAC Investigators 1994		
1994	The Master of Martial Arts		
1994	Filthy Rich		
1994	The Condor Heroes Return		
1994	The Legend of the Condor Heroes	Wan Chi-ping	
1994	Files of Justice III		
1994	Good Morning Sir		
1994	Instinct	Ivan	
1995	Debts of a Lifetime		
1995	Down Memory Lane		
1995	A Good Match From Heaven		
1995	Detective Investigation Files Series II	Tong Ka-chai	
1995	From Act to Act		
1996	Ambition		
1996	Once Upon a Time in Shanghai	Ting Lik	
1996	Mutual Affection		
1997	A Recipe for the Heart	Ho Kai	Guest star
1997	Show Time Blues	Keung Tak-pui	
1997	Time Before Time	Luk Wan-kwong / Hui Dai-kwong	Won – TVB Anniversary Award for Best On-screen Couple; Nominated – TVB Anniversary Award for Best Actor
1997	The Disappearance	Au Chi-lap	
1998	A Measure of Love	Kwan Ka-yan	
1998	Simply Ordinary	Lam Sai-wing	
1998	Old Time Buddy - To Catch a Thief	Tse Sei	
1999	Road to Eternity	Hui Tak	
1999	Plain Love II	Fong Yau-wai	Won – TVB Anniversary Award for My Favourite Television Character
2000	The Legendary Four Aces	Man Jing-ming	
2000	Crimson Sabre	Yuen Sing-chi	
2001	Reaching Out	Tai Fuk-sang	
2001	Country Spirit	Ko Shun	
2005	The Fugitive	Sima Duxing	
2006	Dragon Gate Post	Lu Dingtian	
2018	The Great Adventurer Wesley Fragment Man	Deng Shi	

== Awards and nominations ==
Year	Award	Category	Nominated work	Result	Ref.
2002	21st Hong Kong Film Awards	Best Supporting Actor	Dance of a Dream	Nominated	
2009	28th Hong Kong Film Awards	Best Supporting Actor	IP Man	Nominated	
2011	30th Hong Kong Film Awards	Best Film	Gallants	Won	
2013	32nd Hong Kong Film Awards	Best Supporting Actor	Cold War	Nominated	
2017	36th Hong Kong Film Awards	Best Actor	Trivisa	Won	
2018	37th Hong Kong Film Awards	Best Supporting Actor	Paradox	Nominated	
2020	57th Golden Horse Awards	Best Leading Actor	Hand Rolled Cigarette	Nominated	
2021	20th New York Asian Film Festival	Variety Star Asia Award	Hand Rolled Cigarette	Won	
2022	59th Golden Horse Awards	Best Leading Actor	Limbo	Nominated	
2022	40th Hong Kong Film Awards	Best Actor	Limbo	Nominated	
2022	40th Hong Kong Film Awards	Best Actor	Hand Rolled Cigarette	Nominated	
2022	40th Hong Kong Film Awards	Best Screenplay	Time	Nominated	
