= Da Nao Guangchanglong =

大鬧廣昌隆 may refer to:

- Finale in Blood, 1991 Hong Kong film starring Lawrence Cheng and David Wu
- Time Before Time, TVB series released in Hong Kong in 1997
