= Aaron Kwok filmography =

This is the filmography of Hong Kong singer and actor Aaron Kwok.

== Film ==
Year	Title	Role	Notes/Ref.
1989	Close Escape	Ben Kwok	
1990	Story of Kennedy Town	Lee Siu-wai	
1991	Lee Rock II	Lui Yong-yin	
1991	The Queen of Gamble	Ah Po	
1991	The Banquet	Younger Brother of Small B Head	
1991	Saviour of the Soul	Silver Fox	Nominated—Hong Kong Film Award for Best Supporting Actor
1992	Truant Heroes	Ace	
1992	Gangs '92	Sam Lam	
1992	Rhythm of Destiny	Lee Ka-wah	
1992	Gameboy Kids	Chung	
1992	The Shootout	Wong Ka-fai	
1993	Millionaire Cop	Ball/Jessy Li	
1993	Legend of the Liquid Sword	Chu Liuxiang	
1993	The Bare-Footed Kid	Guan Fung-yao	
1993	A Moment of Romance II	Ah Fu	
1993	Future Cops	Ryu	
1993	Love is a Fairy Tale	Hung	
1994	The Kung Fu Scholar	Lau Sin-hoi	
1995	Whatever Will Be, Will Be	Mr. Lam	
1996	Somebody Up There Likes Me	Ken Wong	
1998	Anna Magdalena	Yau Muk-yan (Yau Wing-fu)	
1998	The Storm Riders	Striding Cloud	Nominated—Hong Kong Film Award for Best Original Film Song
2000	2000 A.D.	Peter Li	
2000	And I Hate You So	Zhang Yong	
2000	China Strike Force	Darren Tong	
2001	Para Para Sakura	Wong Kam-shing (Sexy King)	Nominated—Hong Kong Film Award for Best Original Film Song
2003	1:99	—N/a	Short film
2003	Love Under the Sun	—N/a	Short film
2004	Heat Team	YT Lee	
2004	Throw Down	Tony	
2005	Divergence	Suen Siu-yan	Golden Horse Award for Best Actor; Nominated—Hong Kong Film Award for Best Actor
2006	After This Our Exile	Chow Cheung-sheng	Golden Horse Award for Best Actor; Nominated—Hong Kong Film Award for Best Actor
2007	The Detective	Chan Tam	Nominated—Golden Horse Award for Best Actor; Nominated—Hong Kong Film Award for Best Actor
2008	One 2008th	—N/a	Short film
2009	Murderer	Ling Kwong	Nominated—Hong Kong Film Award for Best Actor
2009	Empire of Silver	Third Master	
2009	The Storm Warriors	Striding Cloud	
2010	City Under Siege	Sunny	
2011	Love for Life	Zhao Deyi	Nominated—Golden Rooster Award for Best Actor
2011	The Detective 2	Tam	
2011	Love in Space	Michael Chan	
2012	Floating City	Bo Wah-chuen	
2012	Cold War	Sean K.F. Lau	
2013	Better and Better	Xie Defa	
2013	Conspirators	Chan Tam	
2013	Christmas Rose	Chan Chi-tin	
2013	Silent Witness	Tong Tao	
2014	The Monkey King	Bull Demon King	
2015	Port of Call	Detective Chong	Nominated—Golden Horse Award for Best Actor; Hong Kong Film Award for Best Actor
2015	Monk Comes Down the Mountain	Zhou Xiyu	
2016	The Monkey King 2	Sun Wukong	
2016	MBA Partners	Meng Xiaojun	Special appearance
2016	Cold War 2	Sean K. F. Lau	
2016	One Night Only	Gao Ye	
2017	Peace Breaker	Gao Jianxiang	
2017	Eternal Wave	Lin Xiang	
2018	The Monkey King 3	Sun Wukong	
2018	Project Gutenberg	Lee Man	Nominated—Hong Kong Film Award for Best Actor
2019	I'm Livin' It	Bowen Tung	Nominated—Hong Kong Film Award for Best Actor
2021	Home Sweet Home	Mr. Wang	
2022	Where the Wind Blows	Lui Lok	
2023	Cyber Heist	Kelvin Cheuk Ka-chun	
2023	The White Storm 3: Heaven or Hell	Cheung Kin-hang	
2024	Rob N Roll	Mui Lam-tin	
2024	Twilight of the Warriors: Walled In	Jim	Special appearance
2025	My First of May	Tang Suk-yin	
2025	Under Current	Ma Ying-fung	
2026	Cold War 1994	Sean Lau	
TBD	June		

== Television series ==
Year	Title	Role	Notes
1987	Young Beat		
1987	Shang Hai Dai Fung Bo	Japanese general	
1987	Genghis Khan	Nok-yin	
1988	Everybody's Somebody's Favourite	Sung Kai-yuen	
1988	Twilight of a Nation	Chun Yat-kong	
1988	The Final Verdict	Rascal	
1989	Song Bird	Wong Chun-chun	
1989	Two of a Kind	Tsui Yu	
1990	When Things Get Tough	Ng Yu	
1990	The Gods and Demons of Zu Mountain	Yim Kam-sim	
1991	Yuppie on the Move	Patrick Lam	
1991	Man from Guangdong	Leung Kan	
1992	Modern Love Story	On	Episode 3
1992	Revelation of the Last Hero	Lok Fung / Nip Wan	
1994	Heartstrings	Lam Chun-fai	
1996	Wars of Bribery	Yeung Tai-chi	
2003	Romancing Hong Kong	Ku Ho-man	
2003	Regalia Bay	Aaron	Episodes 5-6
2004	Sunshine Heartbeat	Aaron	Cameo
