= Cherrie Ying =

Taiwanese-born Hong Kong actress

- 應采兒
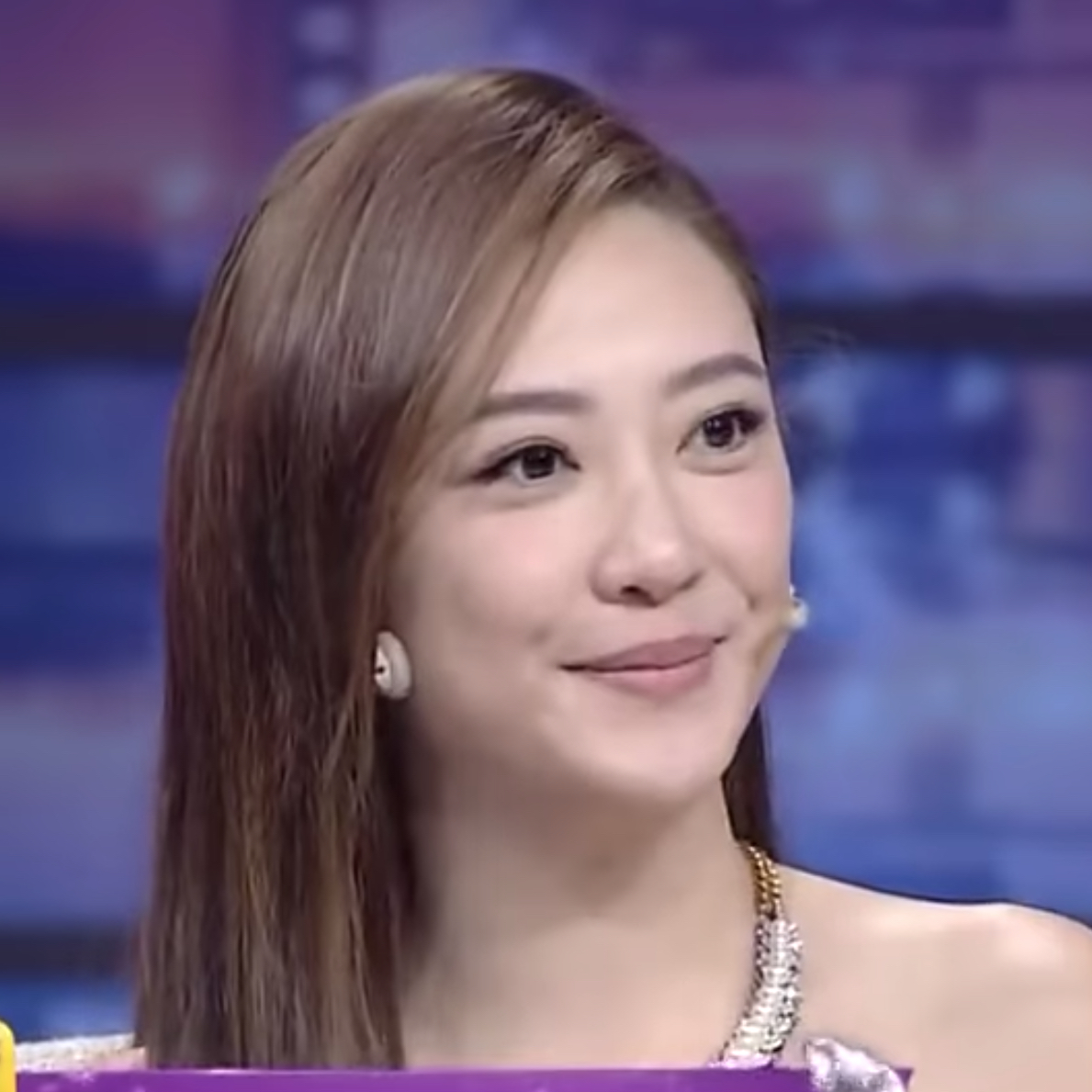
- Ying in 2016
- Born: Ting Man (丁文); 20 June 1983 (age 43); Taiwan
- Occupation: Actress
- Years active: 2001–present
- Spouse: Jordan Chan (m. 2010)
- Children: Two sons
Ying Choi-yi
- Traditional Chinese: 應采兒
- Simplified Chinese: 应采儿
Transcriptions
Standard Mandarin
- Hanyu Pinyin: Yìng Cǎiér
Yue: Cantonese
- Jyutping: Jing1 Coi2 Ji4
Ting Man
- Chinese: 丁文
Transcriptions
Standard Mandarin
- Hanyu Pinyin: Dīng Wén
Yue: Cantonese
- Jyutping: Ding1 Man2
Ting Yim-yi
- Traditional Chinese: 丁冉兒
- Simplified Chinese: 丁冉儿
Transcriptions
Standard Mandarin
- Hanyu Pinyin: Dīng Rǎnér
Yue: Cantonese
- Jyutping: Ding1 Jim5 Ji4
- Musical career
- Also known as: Ying Choi-yi

Cherrie Ying Choi-yi (Chinese: 應采兒 born Ting Man, later Ting Yim-yi, 20 June 1983), also known as Cherrie In, is an actress. Born in Taipei and grew up in New York, she began her career in Hong Kong before moving to Mainland China.

== Career ==
After making her film debut in Fulltime Killer, Ying caught the attention of Charles Heung's wife, Tiffany Chen, and was signed to a contract with China Star Entertainment Group. Since then, Ying has been working consistently as an actress and continues to gain popularity in the Hong Kong cinema.

Ying married actor and singer Jordan Chan on 14 February 2010 at The Little White Wedding Chapel in Las Vegas, Nevada, U.S. They have two sons, born in 2013 and 2020.

== Filmography ==
=== Film ===
Year	English title	Chinese title	Role	Notes
2001	Dance of a Dream	愛君如夢	June	
2001	Fulltime Killer	全職殺手	Gigi	
2002	The Wall	黑道風雲	San	
2002	Visible Secret 2	幽靈人間II鬼味人間	September	
2002	My Left Eye Sees Ghosts	我左眼見到鬼	Tina	
2002	Fat Choi Spirit	嚦咕嚦咕新年財	Cherrie	
2002	Mighty Baby	絕世好B	Ginger	
2003	Naked Ambition	豪情	Pamela	
2003	Why Me, Sweetie?!	失憶界女王	Ding Ding	
2004	Throw Down	柔道龍虎榜	Mona	
2004	Itchy Heart	七年很癢	Cherry	
2005	Kung Fu Mahjong 2	雀聖2之自摸天后	Fanny	
2005	Himalaya Singh	喜馬拉亞星	Tally	
2005	Wait 'til You're Older	童夢奇緣	Miss Lee	
2005	Slim till Dead	瘦身	Cherry	
2006	Karmic Mahjong	血戰到底	Jiajia	
2006	Rob-B-Hood	寶貝計劃	Li Man-yee	
2006	Lethal Angels	魔鬼天使	Emma	
2006	Nothing Is Impossible	情意拳拳	Vivian Siu	
2006	Mr. 3 Minutes	3分鐘先生	Lam Choi-yuk	
2009	Kung Fu Chefs	功夫廚神	Sam Ching	
2009	Poker King	撲克王	Season	
2010	Wulin Xiaozhuan	武林笑传		alternative title Xiyou Ji
2010	Virtual Recall	異空危情		
2011	No Liar, No Cry	不怕賊惦記		
2011	Great Wall, My Love	神州电影		
2012	All's Well, Ends Well 2012	八星抱喜	Carl's girlfriend	
2012	Marry a Perfect Man	嫁個100分男人		
2012	The Mask of Love			
2013	A Complicated Story	一個複雜故事	Tracy T.	
2016	Three Bad Guys	戀愛教父之三個壞傢伙	Ning Dai	
2016	Good Take!			
2018	Super App			
2019	The White Storm 2 - Drug Lords	掃毒2之天地對決		

=== Television ===
Year	English title	Chinese title	Role	Notes
2004	Love Bird	候鳥e人	Shen Yunqing	
2005	Legend - A Dream Named Desire	美麗傳說之星願		
2005	Legend - A Dream Named Desire 2	美丽傳說2 星願		
2007	Hong Kong Sisters	香港姊妹	Lin Yuhong	
2008	Royal Tramp	鹿鼎記	A'ke	
2008	Xialü Tan'an	侠侣探案	Shen Xiaoyu	alternative title Situ Kong Tan'an (司徒空探案)
2008	Fengchuan Mudan	凤穿牡丹	Yu Zhilan	
2008	Wo De Sanshi Nian	我的三十年	Ou Jing	
2009	Bing Shi Shuizhao De Shui	冰是睡着的水		
2010	Big Whaling Room	大捕房	Guan Qingyue / Guan Qingshan	alternative title Hou Shanghai Tan (后上海滩)
2015	Alpha Beta	天才在左, 疯子在右	Li Shi Hui 李诗慧 (精神科医生)	she was the producer for this drama
2017	Midnight Diner			
