= Jiang Hu (2004 film) =

2004 Hong Kong film by Wong Ching-po

- Film poster

Chinese name
- Traditional Chinese: 江湖
- Simplified Chinese: 江湖
Transcriptions
Standard Mandarin
- Hanyu Pinyin: Jiāng Hú
Yue: Cantonese
- Jyutping: Gong1 Wu4
- Directed by: Wong Ching-po
- Screenplay by: To Chi-long
- Story by: To Chi-long; Wong Ching-po
- Produced by: Eric Tsang; Andy Lau; Alan Tam
- Starring: Andy Lau; Jacky Cheung; Shawn Yue; Edison Chen
- Cinematography: Charlie Lam; Kenny Lam
- Edited by: Pang Ching Hei
- Music by: Mark Lui
- Production companies: Focus Films; Anytime Pictures; Go Film Distribution; Media Asia Films; SMI; See Corporation
- Distributed by: Focus Films
- Release date: 26 May 2004
- Running time: 85 minutes
- Country: Hong Kong
- Language: Cantonese
- Budget: HK$30,000,000 (estimated)
- Box office: HK$12,911,837

Jiang Hu is a 2004 Hong Kong crime drama film revolving around Hong Kong gangs. It was directed by Wong Ching-po and stars Andy Lau and Jacky Cheung, in their second collaboration after As Tears Go By, which is regarded as a thematic sequel to the latter. The film is also known as Blood Brothers in Singapore, and Triad Underworld in the United States.

== Plot ==
Jiang Hu tells two stories simultaneously. The first is about a gang leader, Mr. Hung (played by Andy Lau), and the tensions that arise between him and his old friend and second-in-command, Lefty (played by Jacky Cheung), due to Mr. Hung's wife's recent childbirth. Now that Hung is with a child, Lefty feels that Hung should leave the gang business as he is now burdened with family and that will appear weak in character to their own under-bosses. Lefty also believes that it is his own turn to run the business in his own direction. However, Hung is unhappy with Lefty's leadership style of fear and brutality to keep his underlings in line, and is hesitant to cede power to Lefty. To further complicate matters, news of Hung becoming a father has spread unrest amongst his under-bosses, and there are rumours that someone has placed a hit on Mr. Hung. Suspicion as to who is plotting against Mr. Hung has been placed on three leading underbosses, resulting in Lefty sending loyal henchmen going on a hunt to locate and kill the bosses; one is killed and Mr Hung's henchmen save the other two on Mr Hung's orders. In the end, it is alluded that the guilty party attempts to call off the hit under the guise of checking on his family, however he was unable to follow through with the action after he was assured by Hung's henchman that his family is safe and untouched.

The second story is about two teenage low ranking gang members named Yik and Turbo, who are hoping to gain respect and rank in the gangs by performing a hit on a gang leader. The gang leader is not displayed in the movie, and the audience is led to believe that Yik and Turbo are planning to murder Mr. Hung. Yik frequents a brothel whom he has a crush on one of the prostitutes that work there while Turbo starts trouble with other gang members which results in him losing the function of his right hand. He was about to be forced into an act of bestiality with a dog but before this can occur Yik rescues Turbo. However the traumatic experience leads Turbo to begin to act in a merciless fashion. Finally, Yik and Turbo proceed to perform the hit on the unnamed gang leader. This story-line details their journey together up until the assassination, and displays the friendship between the two.

The film ends with Mr. Hung confronting Lefty in a restaurant and revealing that it was Lefty that leaked the news of Hung being a father. It is now revealed that Yik and Turbo are in fact Hung and Lefty during their youth. After they reconcile their differences, they realize they have been surrounded by assassins. In a final act of friendship, Hung and Lefty proceed to fend off hordes of assassins before eventually collapsing to their wounds and finished off by a group of grunts. It then shows the killing of the gang leader by Yik and Turbo. The final scene show Yik explaining how he managed to gain power and respect by completing the assassination of the gang leader and then showing the complete transition of Yik into Hung; suggesting that the cycle will continue with the pair of assassins that had successfully killed Hung and Lefty and is on their way to power and respect.

== Cast ==
- Andy Lau as Hung Yan-jau
- Jacky Cheung as Lefty
- Shawn Yue as Wing
- Edison Chen as Turbo
- Jacklyn Wu as Mrs. Hung
- Eric Tsang as Tall Man
- Norman Chui as Big Lungs
- Lin Yuen as Yoyo
- Michael Miu as Figo
- Kara Hui as Wing's Mother
- Gordon Lam as Shing
- Lam Suet as Officer
- Donna Chu as Figo's Wife
- Ha Ping as Lefty's Mum
- Tony Ho as Brother Lin
- Hugo Ng as Target Brother
- Chapman To as Brother To
- Wong Ching as Old Hui
- Wong Shu-tong as Ming
- Iris Wong as Gorgeous
- Courtney Wu as Party Guest

== Accolades ==
Awards and nominations
Ceremony	Category	Recipient	Result
24th Hong Kong Film Awards	Best New Director	Wong Ching-po	Won
24th Hong Kong Film Awards	Best Art Direction	Yank Wong, Lam Ching	Nominated
24th Hong Kong Film Awards	Best Costume Make Up Design	Yank Wong, Petra Kwok	Nominated

== See also ==
- List of Hong Kong films
- Andy Lau filmography
- Jacky Cheung filmography
