= Visible Secret 2 =

2002 Hong Kong film by Abe Kwong

- Film poster
- Directed by: Abe Kwong
- Written by: Lau Ho-leung; Abe Kwong
- Produced by: Ann Hui
- Starring: Eason Chan; Cherrie Ying; Roger Kwok
- Cinematography: Mark Lee Ping-bing
- Music by: Tommy Wai; Eason Chan
- Production company: Media Asia Films
- Release date: 20 June 2002
- Running time: 93 minutes
- Country: Hong Kong
- Language: Cantonese

Visible Secret 2 (Chinese: 幽靈人間II之鬼味人間) is a 2002 Hong Kong horror comedy film directed by Abe Kwong and stars Eason Chan and Cherrie Ying.

== Plot ==
A man with the ability to see ghosts begins to suspect that his wife may be possessed.

== Cast ==
- Eason Chan
- Cherrie Ying
- Roger Kwok
- Jo Kuk
- Joe Cheung
- Law Lan
- Sheila Chan
- Sum Sum

== Release ==
Visible Secret 2 was released in Hong Kong in 2002. In the Philippines, the film was released by Media Asia Films on October 15, 2003.

== See also ==
- Visible Secret (2001)
