= Rob N Roll =

2024 Hong Kong film by Albert Mak

- Official film poster
- Traditional Chinese: 臨時劫案
- Simplified Chinese: 临时劫案
- Literal meaning: Provisional Robbery
- Hanyu Pinyin: Lín Shí Jié Àn
- Jyutping: Lam4 Si4 Kip3 Ngon3
- Directed by: Albert Mak
- Screenplay by: Albert Mak; Ryker Chan; Man Uen-Ching
- Produced by: Derek Yee
- Starring: Aaron Kwok; Gordon Lam; Richie Jen
- Cinematography: Davy Chou
- Edited by: Jeff Cheung
- Music by: Hanz Au; Iris Liu
- Production companies: Entertaining Power; Film Unlimited
- Distributed by: Gala Film Distribution
- Release dates: 19 January 2024 (China); 9 February 2024 (Hong Kong)
- Running time: 98 mins
- Country: Hong Kong
- Language: Cantonese
- Box office: $33 million

Rob N Roll is a 2024 Hong Kong action comedy film produced by Derek Yee directed by Albert Mak. The film stars Aaron Kwok as a robber who forces two dispirited, middle-aged men played by Gordon Lam and Richie Jen, to participate in a heist.

Production for Rob N Roll officially began in November 2021.

The film was released in Hong Kong on 9 February 2024 (New Year's Eve) as a Chinese New Year film for the Year of the Dragon.

== Plot ==
A fierce robber has plotted a major heist. But unfortunately, his plan was unintentionally foiled by two dispirited middle-aged best friends, and the stolen cash disappears. As a result, the trio has to run from the pursue of a policewoman, as well as engaging in a firearm in order to reclaim the stolen cash, putting their life on the line.

== Cast ==
- Aaron Kwok as Mui Lam-tin (梅藍天), a bucktoothed, former professional wrestler turned robber who is vicious but principled.
- Gordon Lam as Robby (笠水), a taxi driver struggling to make ends meet as his wife is about to give birth soon.
- Richie Jen as Mo Yung-fai (慕容輝), Robby's best friend, a kind nursing home owner who is in debt due to his generous personality.
- Maggie Cheung Ho-yee as Ginger (姜姐), a veteran policewoman who wishes to crack a major case before she retires.
- Lam Suet as Fatty
- Lo Hoi-pang as Cha Siu-bao, Robby's father
- Leung Chung-hang as Fisher (魚佬), a young police officer and Ginger's partner.
- Paw Hee-ching as Robby's mother who often quarrels with her daughter-in-law, Elaine.
- Michael Wong as Charcoal
- Paulyn Sun as Chong
- Mike Tsang as Big Head
- Calvert Fu as Kuk, a bandit for Mui Lam-tin
- Deon Cheung as Lan, a bandit for Mui Lam-tin
- John Chiang, Jr as Nam
- Ansonbean as Lee Ka-wai
- Kathy Wong as Bingo
- David Chiang as Mr. Shrimp (guest appearance)
- Nancy Wu as Eileen Choi (蔡依林), Robby's sassy pregnant wife. (special appearance)

== Production ==
News of the project first appeared in April 2021 when the Film Production Financing Scheme of the Hong Kong Film Development Fund approved HK$8.4 million for the film, with Albert Mak attached as director and Gordon Lam and Stephy Tang set to star. On 27 October 2021, Aaron Kwok revealed to the press that he will starring in the film as a robber and will be co-starring with Lam and Richie Jen.

Principal photography for Rob N Roll began in November 2021. On 12 November, filming of a robbery and vehicular crash scene took place in Temple Street, Hong Kong with actors Kwok, Maggie Cheung Ho-yee and Calvert Fu. There, Kwok revealed a bucktoothed look for his character in the film.

On 20 December 2021, filming a firearm shootout scene took place at the Kwai Tsing Container Terminals. That day, Kwok revealed to the media that his bucktooth look was his own idea he suggested after reading the film's script and noticing black comedy elements being present, while he will also be wearing a cauliflower ear made from special effects as his character is also a professional wrestler. Lam also unveiled his long-haired look as a taxi driver while Jen unveiled his grizzled look wearing a gray wig. Cheung reveals that she will be firing a gun on screen for the first time in this film while Nancy Wu also give details about his role as Lam's wife who will be quarreling with her mother-in-law played by Paw Hee-ching. David Chiang, who appears in the film alongside his real-life son, John Chiang, Jr stated he had no clue his half-brother Derek Yee was serving as the film's producer before his son was cast.

== Awards and nominations ==
Year	Award	Category	Nominee	Result	Ref.
2025	31st Hong Kong Film Critics Society Awards	Best Screenplay	Albert Mak, Ryker Chan, Man Uen-ching	Won	
2025	31st Hong Kong Film Critics Society Awards	Film of Merit	—N/a	Won	
2025	43rd Hong Kong Film Awards	Best Screenplay	Albert Mak, Ryker Chan, Man Uen-ching	Nominated	
2025	43rd Hong Kong Film Awards	Best Actor	Aaron Kwok	Nominated	
2025	43rd Hong Kong Film Awards	Best Costume Make Up Design	Man Lim-chung, Kwok In-wai	Nominated	

== See also ==
- Aaron Kwok filmography
