= 30th Hong Kong Film Awards =

2011 Hong Kong Film Awards

- Date: 17 April 2011
- Site: Hong Kong Cultural Centre
- Hosted by: Teresa Mo, Lawrence Cheng, Vincent Kok

The 30th Hong Kong Film Awards ceremony took place on 17 April 2011.

The film Detective Dee and the Mystery of the Phantom Flame, received the most nominations (13) and won most awards (6). The Best Film went to Gallants. The highlights of the year were some clips of past Hong Kong Film Awards played during the ceremony, and in the presentation of giving the Best Director Award by Chow Yun-fat.

== Awards ==
Winners are listed first, highlighted in boldface, and indicated with a double dagger (‡).

**Best Film**: **Gallants**‡; Detective Dee and the Mystery of the Phantom Flame; Ip Man 2; Reign of Assassins; The Stool Pigeon	**Best Director**: **Tsui Hark** **— Detective Dee and the Mystery of the Phantom Flame**‡; Derek Kwok and Clement Cheng — Gallants; Wilson Yip — Ip Man 2; Su Chao-pin — Reign of Assassins; Dante Lam — The Stool Pigeon
**Best Screenplay**: **Pang Ho-cheung and Heiward Mak — Love in a Puff (film)**‡; Lawrence Cheng and Barbara Wong — Break Up Club; Ivy Ho — Crossing Hennessy; Derek Kwok, Clement Cheng and Frankie Tam — Gallants; Jack Ng — The Stool Pigeon	**Best Actor**: **Nicholas Tse — The Stool Pigeon**‡; Chow Yun-fat — Confucius; Jacky Cheung — Crossing Hennessy; Tony Leung Ka-fai — Bruce Lee, My Brother; Nick Cheung — The Stool Pigeon
**Best Actress**: **Carina Lau** **— Detective Dee and the Mystery of the Phantom Flame**‡; Fiona Sit — Break Up Club; Tang Wei — Crossing Hennessy; Miriam Yeung — Love in a Puff; Josie Ho — Dream Home	**Best Supporting Actor**: **Teddy Robin — Gallants**‡; Tony Leung Ka-fai — Detective Dee and the Mystery of the Phantom Flame; Deng Chao — Detective Dee and the Mystery of the Phantom Flame; Wang Xueqi — Reign of Assassins; Liu Kai-chi — The Stool Pigeon
**Best Supporting Actress**: **Susan Shaw — Gallants**‡; Mimi Chu — Crossing Hennessy; Ninna Paw — Crossing Hennessy; Zhang Jingchu — City Under Siege; Candice Yu — Once a Gangster	**Best New Performer**: **Hanjin Tan — Bruce Lee, My Brother**‡; Jing Boran — Hot Summer Days; Byron Pang — Amphetamine; Dennis To — Ip Man 2; Dennis To — The Legend Is Born - Ip Man
**Best Cinematography**: **Peter Pau — Confucius**‡; Chan Chi-ying and Chan Chor-keung — Detective Dee and the Mystery of the Phantom Flame; Jason Kwan — Merry-Go-Round; Poon Hang-sang — Ip Man 2; Horace Wong — Reign of Assassins	**Best Film Editing**: **Cheung Ka-fai — Ip Man 2**‡; Yau Chi-wai — Detective Dee and the Mystery of the Phantom Flame; Cheung Ka-fai — Reign of Assassins; Kwong Chi-leung — Triple Tap; Chan Ki Hop and Matthew Hui — The Stool Pigeon
**Best Art Direction**: **James Choo** **— Detective Dee and the Mystery of the Phantom Flame**‡; Lin Chaoxiang and Mao Huaiqing — Confucius; Silver Cheung — Bruce Lee, My Brother; Kenneth Mak — Ip Man 2; Yang Baigu and Simon So — Reign of Assassins	**Best Costume Make Up Design**: **Bruce Yu** **— Detective Dee and the Mystery of the Phantom Flame**‡; Kenneth Yee — Confucius; Stanley Cheung — Bruce Lee, My Brother; Dora Ng Li-lo — Legend of the Fist: The Return of Chen Zhen; Emi Wada — Reign of Assassins
**Best Action Choreography**: **Sammo Hung — Ip Man 2**‡; Yuen Tak — Gallants; Sammo Hung — Detective Dee and the Mystery of the Phantom Flame; Donnie Yen — Legend of the Fist: The Return of Chen Zhen; Stephen Tung — Reign of Assassins	**Best Original Film Score**: **Teddy Robin and Tommy Wai — Gallants**‡; Mak Chun-hung — Break Up Club; Peter Kam — Detective Dee and the Mystery of the Phantom Flame; Kenji Kawai — Ip Man 2; Peter Kam — Reign of Assassins
**Best Original Film Song**: **Here to Stay — Merry-Go-Round**‡; Composer: Jun Kung; Lyricist: Jun Kung; Singer: Jun Kung; Orchid Parade — Confucius; Composer: Ou Ge; Lyricist: Foreland Cultural Salon; Singer: Faye Wong; Long Hot Summer Night — Hot Summer Days; Composer: Kubert Leung; Lyricist: Lyricist; Singer: Jacky Cheung; Hua — Reign of Assassins; Composer: Sa Dingding and Peng Bo; Lyricist: Salad Li Peng Bo and Sa Dingding; Singer: Stefanie Sun; Have a Good Life — Lover’s Discourse; Composer: Mavis Fan; Lyricist: Mavis Fan; Singers: D.D	**Best Sound Design**: **Wang Danrong and Zhao Nan** **— Detective Dee and the Mystery of the Phantom Flame**‡; Kinson Tsang and George Lee — Ip Man 2; Kinson Tsang — Legend of the Fist: The Return of Chen Zhen; Tu Duu-chih — Dream Home; Kinson Tsang — The Stool Pigeon
**Best Visual Effects**: **Lee Yong-gi and Nam Sang-woo** **— Detective Dee and the Mystery of the Phantom Flame**‡; Henri Wong — Ip Man 2; Victor Wong — Legend of the Fist: The Return of Chen Zhen; Andrew Lin, Bart Wong, Ng Yuen-fai and Ho Pui-kin — Dream Home; Foo Sing-choong — Reign of Assassins	**Best New Director**: **Felix Chong — Once a Gangster**‡; Ivy Ho — Crossing Hennessy; Freddie Wong — The Drunkard
**Best Asian Film**: **Confessions (Japan)**‡; Under the Hawthorn Tree (Japan); Seven Days In Heaven (Taiwan); Aftershock (China); Monga (Taiwan)	**Lifetime Achievement**: **Terry Lai**‡
**Professional Achievement**: **Willie Chan**‡
