= Gameboy Kids =

1992 Hong Kong film by Gordon Chan

- DVD cover
- Traditional Chinese: 機Boy小子之真假威龍
- Simplified Chinese: 机Boy小子之真假威龙
- Hanyu Pinyin: Jī Boy Xiǎo Zǐ Zhī Zhēn Jiǎ Wēi Lóng
- Jyutping: Gei1 Boy Siu2 Zi2 Zi1 Zan1 Gaa2 Wai1 Lung4
- Directed by: Gordon Chan
- Written by: Gordon Chan; John Chan; Jason Lam
- Produced by: David Lai; Jessica Chan
- Starring: Andy Lau; Aaron Kwok; Ng Man-tat; Danny Poon; Rosamund Kwan; Sandra Ng; Vindy Chan; Yuen Woo-ping; Lawrence Cheng
- Cinematography: Jimmy Leung
- Edited by: Hai Kit-wai
- Music by: Lowell Lo
- Production company: Teamwork Motion Pictures
- Distributed by: Newport Entertainment
- Release date: 12 June 1992
- Running time: 103 minutes
- Country: Hong Kong
- Language: Cantonese
- Box office: HK$15,001,734

Gameboy Kids is a 1992 Hong Kong action comedy film written and directed by Gordon Chan and starring Andy Lau in dual roles as an idiot savant and triad leader respectively. The plot revolves around the former being mistaken for the latter. The film was produced by Lau's own film company, Teamwork Motion Pictures.

== Plot ==
In Hong Kong, triad leader Uncle Eight Taels (Jeffrey Lau) is terminally ill and calls his son Wong Kau-tai (Andy Lau) back to take over his position before he dies. Eight Tael's brother, 7.5 Taels (Ng Man-tat) and his bodyguard Chung (Aaron Kwok) awaits for Wong's appearance.

Yip Sin-man (Andy Lau) is a grown man with a mentality of a five-year-old who is taken by two members of the Ministry of Foreign Affairs from China to India to study. Despite his mental condition, Yip is a quick learner. Wong Kau-tau, revealed to be three-foot tall man, is also at the Indian airport before being arrested by the airport police for breaking a telephone. In the process, Wong drops his passport and an Indian kid picks it up. Mistaking Wong for Yip, the kid hands the passport to Yip and he leaves for Hong Kong with the two ministers left behind.

In Hong Kong, Chung picks Yip up from the airport and calls him "Big Brother" while Yip does not know what is going on. Later, triad member Hau-tin (Danny Poon), who planning to kill Yip and take over the gang, comes to his house, Yip asks him to tie his shoes and obliviously humiliating Hau-tin. Worrying about Yip's safety, Chung teaches Yip how to use guns which he has no interest in and closely follows him with the other bodyguards although Yip feels annoyed by it. All Yip wants to do is buy toys and play.

The next day, Yip and his underlings go to the toy store and Yip sees a motorcycle. The manager refuses to sell it and later 7.5 Taels sends his henchmen to beat him up and force him to sell the bike. Yip goes to the police station and meets Superintendent Lam (Lam Sheung Yee). Yip agrees to help Lam by making his underlings participate in an "anti-Violence Movement". Later at home, Yip punishes his underlings for being cruel by clipping, sticking with super glue and spanking. Chung humorous says that these punishments do not make them look like triads. Then Hau-tin arrives and Yip forbids him to trafficking drugs and makes him sell cigarettes instead.

During this time, Chi-lam (Rosamund Kwan), the daughter of rival gang leader Master Dragon (Yuen Woo-ping), plots to kill Yip in order to help her father. Yip and Chi-lam meet at the same night in which Yip falls in love with her in first sight and they go out to dinner together.

The next day, Yip and Chi-lam get married and Chi-lam plots to kill him at night. When they were about to go to bed, Yip spots the assassins and Chi-lam is later reluctant to kill him when she sees a big portrait of her in his bedroom wall. Not wanting hurt Yip anymore, Chi-lam leaves. Later Yip comes to her house and somehow knows that she wants to kill him. However, he still loves her. Chi-lam has also fallen in love with Yip. Master Dragon forbids Chi-lam to leave with him unless Yip can beat his top henchmen. Chi-lam demonstrates Yip how to fight and Yip quickly learns it and beats the henchmen. In that scene, one of Dragon's thug, who is actually Hau-tin's thug, takes Dragon's younger daughter (Vindy Chan) hostage and Yip manages to kill him. After this, Dragon approves of Yip and Chi-lam together and accepts Yip as his son in-law.

Some time later, Chi-lam's sister informs her that Yip is not Wong Kau-tai and gives her a picture of an Italian mob boss who knows Wong Kau-tau and is at Hong Kong. In order to cover up Yip's identity, Chi-lam kills the mob boss at a bar. Hau-tin informs the police about this and the police come to Yip's mansion to arrest Chi-tam. During this time, it is revealed to everyone knew that Yip is not Wong. Yip leaves with 7.5 Taels and his daughter (Sandra Ng).

In the middle of the road, their car dies and Chung arrives to kill Yip under the command Kau-man Lung. Chung gives Yip a gun for a Mexican standoff, but Yip empties the bullets. At the count of 1, 2 and 3, 7.5 Taels shoots Chung with his gun. Later, it is revealed that Chung is carrying an empty gun because Yip needs to kill Hau-tin. Chi-lam's sister arrives and picks them up to the mansion.

Back at the mansion, Hau-tin tries to rape Chi-lam right before Yip arrives. 7.5 Taels also arrives to the scene armed with three guns attempting to shoot at Hau-tin and his henchmen coolly but did not manage to even make a single hit. A gun battle ensues in the mansion and after all of Hau-tin's henchmen are killed, Hau-tin overpowers Yip, Chi-lam and 7.5 Taels when they run out of bullets. Later, an injured Chung comes in and shoots Hau-tin's gun and later Yip finally overpowers Hau-tin. When Yip has the chance to kill Hau-tin, he hesitated at first because he did not want to kill anyone. When Hau-tin tries to fight back, Yip finally kills him.

== Cast ==
- Andy Lau as Yip Sin-man / Wong Kau-tai
- Aaron Kwok as Chung
- Ng Man-tat as Uncle 7.5 Taels
- Danny Poon as Hau-tin
- Rosamund Kwan as Chi-lam
- Sandra Ng as 7.5 Taels's daughter
- Vindy Chan as Chi-lam's sister
- Yuen Woo-ping as Master Dragon
- Lawrence Cheng as Gay Shop Manager
- Lam Sheung Yee as Superintendent Lam
- Teddy Chan
- Jeffrey Lau as Uncle Eight Taels
- Mark King as Italian mob boss
- Dion Lam as Assassin at roadblock ambush
- Lee Diy-yue as bodyguard
- Sam Wong as dancer
- Leung Kai-chi as triad in meeting
- Kong Miu-ting as Master Dragon's fighter
- Chan Sek as Master Dragon's fighter
- Kwan Yung as thug
- Adam Chan as thug
- Ho Wing-cheung as thug
- Simon Cheung as policeman
- Wong Man-chun as policeman

== Box office ==
The film grossed HK$15,001,734 at the Hong Kong box office during its theatrical run from 12 June to 1 July 1992 in Hong Kong.

== See also ==
- Andy Lau filmography
- Aaron Kwok filmography
