= Gallants (film) =

2010 Hong Kong film by Derek Kwok and Clement Cheng

- Film poster
- Directed by: Derek Kwok; Clement Cheng
- Written by: Derek Kwok; Clement Cheng; Frankie Tam
- Produced by: Gordon Lam
- Starring: Leung Siu-lung; Chen Kuan-tai; Teddy Robin; Wong You-nam; JJ Jia; MC Jin; Lo Mang
- Cinematography: O Sing-pui
- Edited by: Hui Wai-kit
- Music by: Teddy Robin; Tommy Wai
- Production company: Focus Films
- Distributed by: Focus Films
- Release date: 4 June 2010 (Hong Kong)
- Running time: 100 minutes
- Country: Hong Kong
- Language: Cantonese

Gallants (Chinese: 打擂台; Jyutping: daa2 leoi4 toi4) is a 2010 Hong Kong action comedy film directed by Derek Kwok and Clement Cheng, starring Leung Siu-lung, Chen Kuan-tai and Teddy Robin. The film is set in modern times, but is in the style of Hong Kong action comedy films from the 1960s and 1970s. The film premiered at the Hong Kong Film Festival on 26 March 2010. The film has received favourable reviews on its festival shows in North America.

== Plot ==
In modern-day Hong Kong, Leung King-cheung (Wong You-nam) received a job from his real estate company to handle a dispute in a village in the New Territories. Leung arrives and meets with two old martial artists, Tiger (Leung Siu-lung) and Dragon (Chen Kuan-tai), who are being bullied by the young Chung Sang-mang (MC Jin) and his crew. Chung wants Dragon and Tiger to sell their lease on a tea house which was used as a training dojo by their comatose master Law San (Teddy Robin). When Law suddenly wakes up from his 30-year coma, he is determined to restart his school by taking on Chung and his master Pong Ching (Michael Chan).

== Production ==
Gallants is the directoral debut of Clement Cheng and the third film for his friend director Derek Kwok, as well as a production debut of actor Gordon Lam. The film is produced by Andy Lau's Focus Films, with Lau also serving as executive producer.

Gallants was originally conceived as being about a musical group in the 1960s and 1970s. One member suffers a stroke and begins to realise he has not done anything of importance in his life. Feeling that he may die soon, his last wish is to go back to his youth, find all his friends, and do one final show. Finding it difficult to sell the story about musicians, the writers changed the theme of the plot to being about kung fu masters instead. For the cast, Cheng and Kwok felt that if they could not get the actors Chen Kuan-tai and Bruce Leung, they would not make the film.

Gallants was shot in 18 days.

== Release ==
Gallants had its premiere at the Hong Kong International Film Festival on 26 March 2010. It was released in China and Hong Kong on 4 June 2010. Gallants had its North American premiere at the New York Asian Film Festival on 6 July 2010. In Hong Kong, Gallants was the third highest-grossing film on its opening weekend. It grossed a total of $585,848 on its theatrical run.

== Reception ==
Variety praised the actors in Gallants, noting the charisma of Bruce Leung and Chen Kuan-tai while saying that Teddy Robin "steals the show". Derek Elley of Film Business Asia gave the film a 6 out of 10 rating, calling it a "likable but over-loose tribute to Hong Kong martial arts films of the '60s and '70s." The Independent Film Channel gave the movie a positive review, noting, "This could have been an exercise in cheap nostalgia, and it's not. Taken entirely on its own, it's a wholly entertaining and touching movie about friendship and growing old." The Montreal Gazette gave the film three and a half stars, praising the comedic skills of Leung and Chen, stating that Gallant "has plenty of successful gags, if a few that seem a bit too suited for Nickelodeon at prime-time." Now magazine gave the film a four out of five rating, calling it a "very entertaining salute to old legends" comparing the film to Kung Fu Hustle. Gallants won the award for Best Film and Best Actor (Teddy Robin) at the 17th Hong Kong Film Critics Society Awards. At the 30th Hong Kong Film Awards, Gallants was nominated for Best Film.
