= Thanks for Your Love =

1996 Hong Kong film by Daniel Yu and Norman Law

- US film poster
- Traditional Chinese: 1/2次同床
- Simplified Chinese: 1/2次同床
- Hanyu Pinyin: Èr Fēn Zhī Yī Cì Tóng Chuáng
- Jyutping: Ji6 Fan6 Zi1 Jat1 Ci3 Tung4 Cong4
- Directed by: Daniel Yu; Norman Law
- Screenplay by: Jeffrey Lau; Lee Chi-yin
- Produced by: Norman Law; David Lai
- Starring: Andy Lau; Rosamund Kwan
- Cinematography: William Yim; Lau Hung-chuen
- Edited by: Hai Kit-wai; Poon Hung
- Music by: Henry Lai Wan-man
- Production company: Teamwork Motion Pictures
- Distributed by: Teamwork Motion Pictures
- Release date: 26 September 1996
- Running time: 94 minutes
- Country: Hong Kong
- Language: Cantonese
- Box office: HK$3,591,840

Thanks for Your Love is a 1996 Hong Kong romantic comedy film produced and directed by Daniel Yu and Norman Law and starring Andy Lau and Rosamund Kwan.

== Plot ==
Wah (Andy Lau) has an uninhibited romantic nature and is very optimistic. He also loves motorcycles, but he gets into a traffic accident which damages a business of the company he works for and Wah is fired as a result. Lam-lam (Rosamund Kwan) is old-fashioned and conservative. She wants to get married with his boyfriend Michael (Michael Tao), but she overreacts and gets violent when she gets intimate with a man. Because of this, Michael broke up with her. One day, Wah met Lam-lam at a reception of her company. Having lost her love, Lam-lam was determined to make a breakthrough. Using alcohol to boost her courage, Lam-lam uses her tipsiness to seduce Wah. Wah sees his love fortune coming and the two of them hook up creating a seemingly imaginary and real bewildered night.

== Cast ==
- Andy Lau as Wah
- Rosamund Kwan as Lam-lam
- Deanie Ip as Lam-lam's mother
- Michael Tao as Michael
- Anita Lee as Michael's new girlfriend
- Kong Ngai as Lam-lam's father
- Kung Suet-fa as Ben's girlfriend
- Maria Cordero (cameo)
- Sheila Chan as Nancy
- Kingdom Yuen as Lam-lam's Manager
- Michael Lam as Gay man on the street (cameo)
- Kwan Hoi-san as Uncle Shrimp
- Lee Heung-kam as Sister Kam
- Power Chan
- Radium Cheung
- Wong Po-mei
- Cha Chuen-yee as Wah's boss
- Nelson Cheung as Therapist
- Wong Chi-keung
- Daniel Yu
- Hau Woon-ling
- Lee Wai-wah
- Leung San
- Ching Wan
- Ma Wai-ling

== Theme song ==
- Tide (潮水)
  - Composer: Takashi Tsushini
  - Lyricist/Singer: Andy Lau

== Box office ==
The film grossed HK$3,591,840 at the Hong Kong box office during its theatrical run from 26 September to 9 October 1996 in Hong Kong.

== See also ==
- Andy Lau filmography
