= Teamwork Motion Pictures =

Teamwork Motion Pictures Ltd.
- Company type: Film distributor, production company
- Industry: Hong Kong cinema
- Key people: Andy Lau; Clement Mak
- Products: film

Teamwork Motion Pictures Ltd. (Traditional Chinese: 天幕製作有限公司) is a former Hong Kong film production company. The company was established by Cantopop star, actor and film producer Andy Lau, serving as a producer for films in which Lau appeared as an actor. Following an intense lawsuit in 2002 with producing partner Clement Mak, Lau renamed the company to Focus Group Holdings Limited.

== Establishment ==
Teamwork was established in 1991 by actor/producer Andy Lau as a company involved in film distribution and production. In 2000, Lau invested and collaborated with Clement Mak of CCT Telecoms to form to Teamwork Group, which consisted of the following company and four major subsidiaries:

- Teamwork Corporation Limited, a holding company
- Topman Global Limited, which deals with artist management
- Topman Holdings Limited, which is responsible for ownership and management of all Artist's Intellectual Property Rights in the Content and Films assigned
- Andy World Club Limited, which engages in the organisation of functions and activities.

== Films ==
Teamwork made a total of sixteen films, which include Saviour of the Soul, Moon Warriors, Dance of a Dream, A Fighter's Blues, and Fulltime Killer, all of which featured Lau as an actor and producer with Clement Mak as the films' presenter.

== Lawsuit ==
Lau's collaboration with CCT Telecoms and his partner, Clement Mak turned sour in June 2002 when his artist management contract expired and was not renewed. CCT Telecoms then sent out restriction letters to several production companies from hiring Lau in any sort of performance. Lau then retaliated by sending a lawyer's letter seeking HK$15 million worth of salary that Teamwork owned him.

Then CCT's subsidiary company, Noble Trend International, filed a lawsuit seeking HK$150 million compensation and an injunction order on Lau for violating shareholders' agreement contract. CCT Telecoms further applied another injunction order on Lau for his involvement in the movie Infernal Affairs. Lau lashed back by exclaiming in reports:

This matter makes me see clearly that I'm not made to be a boss. Now I just want to be an artist.

The career-threatening lawsuit spanned for months and the hearing was scheduled for 31 October 2002. Allegations and news of an out-of-court settlement with all kinds of conditions started to spread in the newspapers. Indeed, the lawsuit had reach an out-of-court settlement on the day of the hearing as Lau got full control of Teamwork Group without paying a cent. Lau was quoted for saying:

I'm so happy as all my troubles have been rightfully settled. Currently, all matters are being passed to my lawyers, and the other parties request that I not reveal the details of the settlement, therefore it is inconvienient to reveal anything, what I can say is I've gotten back what I deserved.

Later, Lau renamed the company to Focus Group Holdings Limited in order give the company a fresh start.

== Filmography ==
- Give Them a Chance (給他們一個機會) (2003)
- The Runaway Pistol (走火槍) (2002)
- Fulltime Killer (全職殺手) (2001)
- Dance of a Dream (愛君如夢) (2001)
- A Fighter's Blues (阿虎) (2000)
- The Longest Summer (去年煙花特別多) (1998)
- Made in Hong Kong (香港製造) (1997)
- Thanks for Your Love (1/2次同床) (1996)
- Tian Di (天與地) (1994)
- Women on the Run (赤裸狂奔) (1993)
- Days of Tomorrow (天長地久) (1993)
- Moon Warriors (戰神傳說) (1992)
- Saviour of the Soul II (92神雕俠侶之痴心情長劍) (1992)
- Never-Ending Summer (吳三桂與陳圓圓) (1992)
- Gameboy Kids (機Boy小子之真假威龍) (1992)
- Saviour of the Soul (91神雕俠侶) (1991)
