= Firestorm (2013 film) =

2013 Hong Kong film by Alan Yuen

- Film poster

Chinese name
- Traditional Chinese: 風暴
- Simplified Chinese: 风暴
Transcriptions
Standard Mandarin
- Hanyu Pinyin: Fēng Bào
Yue: Cantonese
- Jyutping: Fung1 Bou6
- Directed by: Alan Yuen
- Written by: Alan Yuen
- Produced by: Andy Lau; William Kong
- Starring: Andy Lau; Yao Chen; Gordon Lam; Hu Jun; Ray Lui
- Cinematography: Chan Chi-ying
- Edited by: Kwong Chi-leung; Ron Chan
- Music by: Peter Kam
- Production companies: Edko Films; Sil-Metropole Organisation; Focus Films; Good Friends Entertainment; China Dream Film Culture Productions; Ample Ideas (Hong Kong) International; He Xin Zhongshan Jin Investment Management; Elegance Media Guangdong Company; Youku Tudou Inc
- Distributed by: Edko Films
- Release dates: 12 December 2013 (China); 19 December 2013 (Hong Kong)
- Running time: 109 minutes
- Country: Hong Kong
- Languages: Cantonese; Mandarin
- Budget: US$20 million
- Box office: US$55.8 million

Firestorm is a 2013 Hong Kong action film written and directed by Alan Yuen, produced by and starring Andy Lau. Lau plays a hard-boiled police inspector who takes the law to his own hands in order to take down a group of violent criminals who have taken multiple innocent lives while repeatedly evading justice. The film was converted to 3D during post-production, making it the first 3D Hong Kong police action film.

Firestorm was chosen to be the opening film at Screen Singapore held on 4 December 2013 where Lau and co-star Gordon Lam walked the red carpet for the film's premiere. The film also opened the 56th Asia Pacific Film Festival on 13 December 2013 in Macau before it was theatrically released on 19 December 2013 in Hong Kong. In addition, Firestorm also had its North American premier at the 57th San Francisco International Film Festival on 3 May 2014.

== Plot ==
Chief Inspector Lui Ming-chit and ex-con To Shing-bong are secondary school classmates who competitively practiced judo together. Right after To was released from prison for robbery, he immediately re-joins Cao Nam and his gang to highjack an armoured car transporting cash. Lui leads his squad to arrest Cao's gang and engages in a gunfight where Cao kills a female hostage. Cao and his gang escape the scene after To suddenly rams Lui's car. To is arrested and he claims the crash was an accident and denies being Cao's accomplice. To is released after his girlfriend, Yin-bing arrives with a lawyer to bail him, but Lui orders his subordinates to tail him. To promises Yin-bing to give up his criminal life and she finds him a job in a restaurant.

The Regional Crime Unit later discovers the corpse of one of Cao's underlings and the burnt remains of the getaway vehicle. Lui leads his squad to raid Cao's hideout after they discover their whereabouts by recognising one of Cao's underlings, Chow, in surveillance camera footage. A firefight breaks out, and Lui manages to arrest Chow while To and Cao manage their escape. At Cao's residence, the police tries to arrest him on account of Chow being able to make a witness implicating Cao. This fails after Chow destroys evidence and throws himself off a building.

Lui enlists the help of his long-time informant Tong Keung who goes undercover at Cao's gang. Tong joins in the next heist but the gang upon discovering the police tailing them become suspicious and attacked Tong. Upon finding a phone provided by Liu, the gang chases Tong to his house. Lui arrives to save Tong but was too late. Cao's gang had shot Tong and threw his 10-year old autistic daughter off the building who eventually succumbs to her injuries. Enraged, Lui confronts Cao, who was driving to the airport, and after a struggle arrests Cao who is officially charged with the murder of Tong and Yuen-yiu after blood and fabric particles of the latter were found on Cao's hand.

Lui later receives a clip from Yin-bing's drug-addicted younger brother, Kit. The clip which was taken from the camera from Cao's car reveals that Liu had framed Cao by wiping the blood of Tong's daughter on him. Liu meets Kit who tries to blackmail Liu for HK$500,000 every month. However, Kit suddenly suffers from an asthma attack and dies after Lui refuses him his inhaler. Liu then removes all evidence from Kit's apartment.

Meanwhile, Yin-bing tearfully breaks up with To after encountering him in the previous armoured car heist. She lies that she is two months pregnant with another man's child. To tries to salvage their relationship by claiming to be an undercover cop. To then meets with Lui and informs him the mastermind behind the previous armoured car heist and the murderer of Tong and Yuen-yiu is actually Cao's sworn brother, Paco, who was recently released from prison.

To offers to be Lui's informant in arresting Paco under the condition that Lui tell Yin-bing about To's identity as undercover cop. Lui agrees but Lui does not plan to leave Paco and the gang (including To) alive. Paco leads the gang in another armoured car heist armed with heavy weaponry, which turns out to be a trap set by the police to arrest them when several Special Duties Unit officers turn up inside the armoured car. A firefight breaks out, which spreads towards the Central District.

To, having seen the video of Lui framing Cao, takes a mobile phone from a hostage and calls Lui to allow him to flee in a car, which Lui agrees and tells him not to surrender so that the criminals can be killed by the police. After an intense shootout, the gang is killed, and To flees the scene. Lui initially considers shooting him but ultimately decides not to, but To was unexpectedly run over by an oncoming truck and dies. Yin-bing, who was watching the live broadcast, sees this and cries.

Afterwards, Lui writes a letter to Yin-bing, stating that To was an undercover officer and turns himself in for his illegal actions. After giving his testimony, Lui asks the officer whether the storm is over and shows a sign of gratefulness after being given yes as an answer.

== Cast ==
- Andy Lau as Lui Ming-chit (呂明哲), Chief Inspector of the Regional Crime Unit of Hong Kong Island who holds a strong sense of justice and utterly detests criminals. He is a judo expert and was the interschool champion when he was in secondary school, where he studied with To.
- Gordon Lam as To Shing-bong (陶成邦), a criminal who have been imprisoned multiple times for robbery and is the driver for Cao Nam, and later Paco's crew. He was classmates with Lui during secondary school and also skilled in judo like Lui.
- Yao Chen as Law Yin-bing (羅燕冰), To's girlfriend from mainland China who has mixed feelings for her boyfriend due to his criminal life.
- Hu Jun as Cao Nam (曹南), leader of a robbery gang who was a former soldier from China and Lui's archnemesis. He was later arrested by Lui when the former frames him for the murder of Tong Keung and his daughter.
- Ray Lui as Paco (啪哥), Cao's sworn brother who was recently released from prison and takes over Cao's gang after the latter's arrest.
- Philip Keung as Tong Keung (唐強), an ex-con who was To's cellmate in prison and has worked as Lui's informant for many years.
- Kenny Wong as Chiu Kin-kwok (趙建國), Inspector of the Regional Crime Unit of Hong Kong Island and Lui's second in command.
- Oscar Leung as Kit (阿傑), Yin-bing's asthmatic younger brother who is a small-time criminal and drug addict.
- Michael Tong as Jackal (傻豹), Cao and Paco's underling.
- Vincent Sze as Szeto Yat-ming (司徒一鳴), Probationary Inspector of the Regional Crime Unit of Hong Kong Island and Lui's subordinate.
- Terence Yin as Goofy (高飛), Cao and Paco's underling who is a firearm expert.
- Sammy Hung as Dicky (狄偉), Cao and Paco's underling.
- Michael Wong as Chief Superintendent Choi (蔡警司), deputy commander of the Hong Kong Island Regional Headquarters and Lui's superior officer.
- Wong Cho-lam as a correctional service superintendent.
- Alex Tsui as Chu Yin-ming (朱彥銘), a police negotiator who persuades Paco to surrender.
- Eddie Cheung as a truck driver.
- Ben Wong as the Special Duties Unit team leader.
- Bob Lam as Yin-bing's attorney.
- Mandy Wong as Yin-bing's colleague.
- Lo Hoi-pang as Uncle Chi (智叔), a restaurant owner who Yin-bing pleads to give To a job.
- Grace Wong as a female victim.
- Bonnie Sin as a hostage killed by Cao.
- Lavinia Smith as Nipple, Cao's girlfriend who has a sexual relationship with Kit.
- Cheung Kwok-keung as Sergeant Chow (周Sir), sergeant of the Criminal Intelligence Bureau (CIB).
- Hayama Go as Daffy (大飛), Cao's underling who was executed by the former for revealing himself during the opening heist.
- Brian Siswojo as Au-yeung Ping (歐陽平), Lui's subordinate.
- Phat Chan as Phat (阿肥), Lui's subordinate.
- Jacqueline Chan as Tong Yuen-yiu (唐婉姚), Tong Keung's ten-year-old autistic daughter who Lui regards as his goddaughter and took care of while Tong served in prison.
- Ricky Chan as Chow Lung (周龍), nicknamed Blind Dragon (盲龍), Cao's underling who was taken down and arrested by Lui, who was raiding his hideout, and kills himself after being instructed by Cao to swallow a piece of evidence.

== Production ==
Filming for Firestorm began in November 2012 and was wrapped up on 1 February 2013. Filming locations included North Point, Government House and Hong Kong Zoological and Botanical Gardens in the Central and Sheung Wan areas.

== Reception ==
=== Critical response ===
Firestorm received mixed to positive reviews from critics. Derek Elley of Film Business Asia gave a positive review praising the acting, especially by Andy Lau and Gordon Lam, strong characters and action sequences, referring it as "one of the best Hong Kong shoot-'em-ups in recent memory, with top playing and action. Asian and genre events, plus ancillary." Gabriel Chong of MovieXclusive also gave a positive review while rated the film with a score of 4.5/5, praising the action choreography, twisty and compelling narrative and the tight engaging script and referring it as "the must-see Hong Kong action thriller of the year that's packed with exhilarating action, a compelling plot, and a commanding lead performance from Andy Lau." Time Out Hong Kong gave the film three stars out of five praising the action sequences, strong performances and visual effects that were never seen in Hong Kong cinema.

On the other hand, James Marsh of Twitch Film gave the film a mixed review, praising it for having "a vibrant, kinetic aesthetic that attempts to keep its audience in a state of breathless anticipation throughout" and also criticising "the over-reliance on computer-generated effects and the almost total absence of plot or characterisation make Firestorm an incredibly loud, yet hollow experience." Clarence Tsui of The Hollywood Reporter also gave a mixed review praising Lam's performance and action choreography by Chin Ka-lok, but criticising how the film "could not read as anything more than just an action thriller."

=== Box office ===
Firestorm premiered in China on 12 December 2013 and grossed ¥165,308,501 during its first three days and opening at No.1 during its debut weekend. During its second week, the film grossed ¥100,045,163 and was the second highest-grossing film of the week. The film remained at top 10 for the rest of its theatrical run in China and eventually grossed ¥309,878,757.

In Hong Kong, Firestorm premiered on 19 December and grossed HK$8,024,961 during its first three days and was also No. 1 during its opening weekend grossing a total HK$11,056,920 including its preview-screening gross. During its second weekend, the remained at No. 1 spot and grossed HK$11,186,358 The film grossed a total of HK$24,336,182 at the Hong Kong box office.

As of April 2014, Firestorm grossed a total of US$56,382,533 (HK$437,172,118.47) worldwide, combining its box office gross from Hong Kong, China, Malaysia, Singapore, Thailand, Australia and New Zealand.

== Awards and nominations ==
Awards and nominations
| Ceremony | Category | Recipient | Outcome |
|---|---|---|---|
| 33rd Hong Kong Film Awards | Best Action Choreography | Chin Ka-lok | Nominated |
| 33rd Hong Kong Film Awards | Best Film Editing | Kwong Chi-leung, Ron Chan | Nominated |
| 33rd Hong Kong Film Awards | Best Visual Effects | Yu Kwok-leung, Lai Man-chun, Ho Kwan-cheung, Lam Ka-lok | Nominated |
| 33rd Hong Kong Film Awards | Best New Director | Alan Yuen | Nominated |
| 12th Huading Awards | Top Ten Chinese Films | Firestorm | Won |
| 14th Chinese Film Media Awards | Outstanding Film | Firestorm | Nominated |
| 14th Chinese Film Media Awards | Outstanding Actress | Yao Chen | Won |
