= Time Before Time =

Hong Kong drama television series

- Promo poster
- 大鬧廣昌隆
- Genre: Romance / Suspense
- Created by: Yeung Kam Tsuen
- Starring: Kathy Chow; Gordon Lam
- Opening theme: Holding Your Beloved (抱緊眼前人) by Anita Mui
- No. of episodes: 20

Production
- Producer: Yeung Kam Tsuen
- Production location: Hong Kong
- Running time: 45 mins

Original release
- Network: TVB
- Release: 4 August – 29 August 1997

Time Before Time
- Title screen shot
- Traditional Chinese: 大鬧廣昌隆
- Simplified Chinese: 大闹广昌隆
Transcriptions
Standard Mandarin
- Hanyu Pinyin: dà nào guǎng chāng lóng
Yue: Cantonese
- Jyutping: daai6 naau6 gwong2 coeng1 lung4

Time Before Time (Chinese title: 大鬧廣昌隆) was the most successful TVB series released in Hong Kong in 1997, the year that Hong Kong was transferred back to China. The series stars Gordon Lam and Kathy Chow with the storyline dealing greatly with the themes of fate, love and traditional Chinese supernatural beliefs.

== Synopsis ==
=== 1920s ===
In 1922 a young couple, Luk Wan-kwong (Gordon Lam) and Siu Fu-yung (Kathy Chow) were murdered in Guangzhou, China. From the time of their death, the warehouse store "Guang chang lung" passes to Luk's surviving brothers. The mystery of their deaths is never solved, though rumours begin that the store has become inhabited by a female ghost.

=== 1940s ===
In 1947 Hong Kong a lazy 25-year-old coolie named Dai-kwong finds work in the same warehouse store. One night in the allegedly haunted store, he accidentally releases the ghost of Siu Fu-yung from an old oil-paper umbrella. She mistakes Dai-kwong for her lover since he looks exactly the same as her husband Wan-kwong who died 20 years ago. Frightened half to death, Dai-kwong explains that he is not the one she’s looking for and reluctantly promises to help her find her lost lover.

Through a radio station, the ghost of Siu Fu-yung retells her tragic life by possessing the body of the radio host. As time goes on Dai-kwong falls in love with the female ghost and jeopardizes his relationship with his real wife. Later during a stormy night, memories of Dai-kwong’s previous life return and he realises that he is the reincarnation of Luk Wan-kwong. Both in his present and past life he has coincidentally been given the same name, "Kwong". The mystery of who killed Luk Wan-kwong and Siu Fu-yung begins to unravel.

=== 1990s ===
In the 1990s, Fu-yung and Kwong are again reincarnated and it is again their fate to meet again. Fortunately, unlike their previous two lifetimes, it is hinted that this time the two lovers will live happily ever after.

== Cast ==
Gordan Lam and Kathy Chow as Luk Wan Kwong and Siu Fu Yung

Cast	Role	Description
Kathy Chow	Siu Fu-yung (小芙蓉)	1920s wife of Luk Wan-kwong
Kathy Chow	Siu Fu-yung ghost	1940s ghost
Kathy Chow	-	1990s
Gordon Lam	Luk Wan-kwong (陸運廣)	1920s warehouse store owner
Gordon Lam	Hui Dai-kwong (許大廣)	1940s coolie
Gordon Lam	-	1990s
Florence Kwok	Ku Mei-ying (古美英)	1940s wife of Dai-kwong
Kenneth Chan	Che Tat Fu (車達夫)	
Carol Yeung (楊羚)	Hui Suk Jing (許淑貞)	
Sum Wai (沈威)	Ku Yan Gui (古仁貴)	
Johnny Tang (鄧兆尊)	Luk Gai Wah (陸繼華)	
Kan Pui Kuan (簡佩筠)	Luk Hiu Tung (陸曉彤)	
Ho Yuen Hang (何遠恆)	Che Tat Kuan (車達君)	
Jojo Cho (曹眾)	Dan Fung (丹鳳)	
Law Lok Lam (羅樂林)	Che Yu Ting	

== Music ==
The opening theme song "Holding Your Beloved" (抱緊眼前人) was written by Anthony Lun, Terry Chan and composed by George Lam with lyricist Pun Yun-loeng (潘源良). The song was performed by Anita Mui.

The insert song (我愛風光好) was composed by Joseph Koo with lyrics by Albert Leung. It was also performed by Mui, together with Anthony Lun. The song "Waiting For You to Return" (等著你回來) was originally by performed by Bai Guang, a 1930-1940s singer from the shidaiqu era. Throughout the series the song played a role in the story.

== Legacy ==
In 1997, the year when Hong Kong's sovereignty returned to China, the average prime time rating was only about 32. Time before Time was the surprise success of the year as a second-line TVB series. The show began with a rating of 34 points and finished with an average rating for 40 points by the end. This was quite high when compared to other averages of the period.

Kathy Chow's wearing of qipao also left a good impression with the audience and continued to play future roles in other series in similar attire. Her partnership with Gordon Lam also won the series the "most touching romantic award for the year". The main theme song "Holding Your Beloved" (抱緊眼前人) was one of the few TV series songs performed by Anita Mui in her "Anita Classic Moment Live" final concert. just weeks before her death in 2003.

The television series has led to a wider knowledge of the Guang Chang Lung story, especially amongst younger generations, with some searching out the real store and ghost, some have even posted pictures possibly of the real store in the Hong Kong Discuss Forum.

== Cultural Background ==
The warehouse store Guang chang lung (廣昌隆) and the ghost story is based on the Guangzhou folk legend of the same name, a staple of the naamyam style of sung narrative story telling, the original story has also been adapted into Cantonese opera form both in the past and present.

The story has appeared in film multiple times, in a black and white 1949 Hong Kong film with the English title "Ruckus at Kwong Cheong lung", Other versions include the "Musical ghost that causes an uproar in Kwong Cheong Lung" a 1952 film. Part of the story is similarly used for the 1993 movie "Finale in Blood" by Fruit Chan, which uses the same Chinese name for the film title.

The TVB series has elements found in the different versions.

=== Folk beliefs ===
- Throughout the series, paper models of things such as clothes, bicycles and letters burnt. As a traditional belief, the Chinese see this as the only way to send things to persons who exist in the afterlife. See hell money.
- The Chinese philosophy of Yin and Yang is frequently referred to throughout the series. It is used to describe the human and ghost world. Yin energy is associated with passiveness, femininity and yielding therefore, the spirit world whilst on the other hand, Yang is associated with strength, masculinity and brightness – the human world.
- According to Chinese superstition, it is inauspicious to carry an open umbrella inside the home from the outside. The Chinese believe that ghosts find shelter from the sun under umbrellas, and may enter one's home if 'carried' inside.

Before: Drunken Angels: August 1	TVB Jade Second line series 1997; Time Before Time; August 4 - August 29	Next: Detective Investigation Files III; September 1 -
