= Fulltime Killer =

2001 Hong Kong film by Johnnie To and Wai Ka-fai

- Film poster

Chinese name
- Traditional Chinese: 全職殺手
- Simplified Chinese: 全职杀手
- Literal meaning: full-time assassin
Transcriptions
Standard Mandarin
- Hanyu Pinyin: quánzhí shāshǒu
Yue: Cantonese
- Jyutping: cyun4 zik1 saat3 sau2
- Directed by: Johnnie To; Wai Ka-fai
- Written by: Joey O'Bryan; Wai Ka-fai
- Based on: Fulltime Killer by Edmond Pang
- Produced by: Johnnie To; Wai Ka-fai; Andy Lau
- Starring: Andy Lau; Takashi Sorimachi; Simon Yam; Kelly Lin
- Cinematography: Cheng Siu-Keung
- Edited by: David Richardson
- Music by: Alex Khaskin; Guy Zerafa
- Production companies: Teamwork Motion Pictures; Milkyway Image
- Distributed by: Teamwork Motion Pictures
- Release date: 3 August 2001
- Running time: 102 minutes
- Country: Hong Kong
- Languages: Cantonese; Mandarin; English; Japanese
- Box office: HK$28,682,414 (Hong Kong); US$23,124 (USA)

Fulltime Killer (Chinese: 全職殺手) is a 2001 Hong Kong action film directed and produced by Johnnie To and Wai Ka-fai, with the latter being also involved in the screenwriting. It is also produced by and starring Andy Lau. The film was released on 3 August 2001.

The film is based on Pang Ho-cheung's novel of the same name.

== Plot ==
Based on a book by Hong Kong filmmaker Pang Ho-cheung, Fulltime Killer protagonist O is a hitman being challenged by new hotshot Lok Tok-wah. O has lived a life of seclusion as the number one hitman in Asia. The woman living at his contact address is captured after O foils a set-up by his boss. He then goes on the run while trying to fend off his adversary. The last part of the movie focuses on an Interpol detective's attempt to write the story of Tok and O.

== Alternate ending ==
The film has two endings. The normal one that appeared in theaters and the special ending for Malaysia where O and Chin end up being caught by police. This was supposedly done as per special request to show that "Crime doesn't pay".

== Cast ==
- Andy Lau as Lok Tok-wah
- Takashi Sorimachi as O
- Simon Yam as Albert Lee
- Kelly Lin as Ms. Chin
- Cherrie Ying as Gigi
- Lam Suet as Fat Ice
- Rocky Lai as Bald thug
- Liu Chun-hung as Man in Bangkok Jail
- Teddy Li as C7
- Ernest Mauser as Priest
- Wong Chi-wai as Policeman in Singapore
- Lam Chung-kei as Cop

== Home media ==
On 29 March 2004, DVD was released by Tartan Asia Extreme at the United Kingdom in Region 2.

== Reception ==
Fulltime Killer has a rating of 56% on Rotten Tomatoes.

== See also ==
- Andy Lau filmography
- Johnnie To filmography
- List of Hong Kong films of 2001
- List of Hong Kong films
