= Moon Warriors =

1992 Hong Kong film by Sammo Hung

- Theatrical release poster
- 戰神傳說
- Directed by: Sammo Hung
- Written by: Alex Law
- Produced by: Jessica Chan
- Starring: Andy Lau; Kenny Bee; Anita Mui; Maggie Cheung
- Cinematography: Arthur Wong; Cheung Man-po; Tam Chi-wai
- Edited by: Kam Ma
- Music by: Mark Lui; James Wong; Sherman Chow
- Production company: Teamwork Production House
- Distributed by: Newport Entertainment
- Release date: 19 December 1992
- Running time: 83 minutes
- Country: Hong Kong
- Language: Cantonese
- Box office: HK$38,159,986

Moon Warriors (戰神傳說) is a 1992 Hong Kong wuxia film directed by Sammo Hung, written by Alex Law, and produced by Jessica Chan. The film starred Andy Lau, Kenny Bee, Anita Mui and Maggie Cheung. The film was released theatrically in Hong Kong on 19 December 1992.

== Synopsis ==
Fei, a fisherman who is secretly a highly skilled swordsman, saves Yan Shisan, the 13th prince of the Yan kingdom, and befriends him. While Yan Shisan is recovering from his injuries, the fishing village comes under attack by assassins sent by Yan Shisi, Yan Shisan's 14th brother who has usurped the throne. Fei leads Yan Shisan to hide in a remote tomb, where the prince expresses his wish to work with his ally, the Lord of Lanling, to seize back the throne. Fei then goes to find the Lord of Lanling's daughter Yueya'er.

While escorting Yueya'er back to the tomb to meet Yan Shisan, they are attacked by an assassin and Fei is wounded. While Fei is recuperating under Yueya'er's care, they fall in love with each other. However, Yueya'er feels torn as she has already been betrothed to Yan Shisan. The assassin who attacked Fei earlier turns out to be Moxian'er, a guardian originally sent by Yan Shisi to find an opportunity to kill Yan Shisan. Moxian'er has been delaying her mission because she has gradually fallen in love with the prince over time.

After Yueya'er meets Yan Shisan at the tomb, the prince decides to hold their wedding in the autumn and offers to make Fei a general. Fei, who is used to a carefree lifestyle, turns down the offer. One night, after Yan Shisan's men are mysteriously killed, Moxian'er accuses Yueya'er of having a secret affair with Fei, and tries to kill Yueya'er. However, Yueya'er also accuses Moxian'er of being a spy working for Yan Shisi.

Eventually, Yan Shisi leads his soldiers to the village and kills the villagers. Yan Shisan is forced to face Yan Shisi in a fight, during which Moxian'er sacrifices herself to save Yan Shisan. Fei, despite being seriously wounded, manages to defeat and kill Yan Shisi. Yueya'er also dies of her injuries in Fei's arms.

== Cast ==
- Andy Lau as Fei
- Kenny Bee as Yan Shisan
- Anita Mui as Yueya'er
- Maggie Cheung as Moxian'er
- Kelvin Wong as Yan Shisi
- Chang Yi as the Lord of Lanling

== Music ==
Song	Composer	Lyricist	Singer	Notes
You and I Are the Most Freedom (最自由是我和你)	James Wong		Andy Lau	Theme song
Let Spring Show My Smile (趁春濃為我展歡顏)	James Wong		Sally Yeh	Insert theme

== Critical reception ==
Empire gave the film a score of 4/5 stars, praising its balance in character development and jaw-breaking action. Andrew Saroch of Far East Films gave the film a similar score of 4/5 stars and praises the quality of the action choreography and the emotional nature of the characters' dilemmas, J. Doyle Wallis of DVD Talk gave the film a score of 3.5/5 stars, praising Andy Lau and Anita Mui's performances, the action choreography and the set locations. Time Out describes the film as "a visually splendid, dramatically rich, but somewhat rarefied martial arts yarn."
