= Dance of a Dream =

2001 Hong Kong film by Andrew Lau

- Film poster

Chinese name
- Traditional Chinese: 愛君如夢
- Simplified Chinese: 爱君如梦
Transcriptions
Standard Mandarin
- Hanyu Pinyin: Ài Jūn Rú Mèng
Yue: Cantonese
- Jyutping: Ngoi3 Gwan1 Jyu4 Mung6
- Directed by: Andrew Lau
- Written by: Felix Chong
- Produced by: Andy Lau; Andrew Lau
- Starring: Andy Lau; Anita Mui; Sandra Ng
- Cinematography: Andrew Lau; Ko Chiu-Lam
- Edited by: Danny Pang; Curran Pang
- Music by: Jacky Chan; Marco Wan
- Production companies: Teamwork Motion Pictures; Media Asia Films
- Distributed by: Media Asia Distribution
- Release date: 21 December 2001
- Running time: 94 minutes
- Country: Hong Kong
- Language: Cantonese
- Box office: HK$17,794,076

Dance of a Dream (Chinese: 愛君如夢) is a 2001 Hong Kong romantic comedy film co-produced and directed by the film's cinematographer, Andrew Lau and starring Andy Lau, Anita Mui and Sandra Ng.

The opening and final dancing scenes were filmed at The China Club Hong Kong and Hong Kong Park View, respectively.

== Plot ==
Namson Lau (Andy Lau) is a ballroom dancing instructor. On stage, he is a refined and suave gentleman, but in reality, he is cunning and greedy, and dancing has become a mean to strike fortune for him, without any other levels of significance. Kam (Sandra Ng) possesses mediocre qualifications and have been living a dull life in toil, but is optimistic in nature. One time in a ball held by aristocrat Tina Cheung (Anita Mui), Namson performs a dance with Tina which Kam witnesses, who is enchanted by Namson's elegant dance movements, and decides to enroll in Namson's dance courses, hoping to fulfill of dream of dancing elegantly with him. Meanwhile, Namson was also entrusted by Tina's younger brother, Jimmy (Edison Chen), to instruct his sister in tango. On one hand, Kam works hard in part-time jobs to pay her dance tuition, while on the other hand, Namson works to fulfill his dream of buying his dream dance studio in Central and participate in the Blackpool Dance Festival in England. Because of this, Namson have been neglecting the influence that dance brings to his students, and only cares about making money from his students, like the time where he met Tina at the ball, where his cool was to lure Tina into taking dance lessons from him and earning high tuition fees.

While teaching Tina and Kam, Namson gradually realizes how he has been lost about the art of dance. Seeing him in this condition, Kam organizes a party with her fellow dance students for Namson to be happy. The joy of the students dancing in the party gave a positive influence to Namson and the unsociable Tina, who becomes more outgoing. Afterwards, Tina also teaches Kam tango that she learned from Namson, and also purchases Namson's dream studio as a gift to him. At this time, Namson realizes he had fallen in love with Kam. Namson also gets into a moral dilemma of whether to be with Tina in order to fulfill his dream, or Kam, whom he truly loves and who has been highly supportive of him.

== Cast and roles ==
- Andy Lau as Namson Lau
- Sandra Ng as Kam
- Anita Mui as Tina Cheung
- Edison Chen as Jimmy Cheung
- Gordon Lam as Faye Wong Yat-fei
- Cherrie Ying as June
- Ronald Cheng as Yip Wai-shun
- Suzanne Chung as Mrs. Yip
- Lam Chi-chung as Fatty
- Halina Tam as Kam's housemate
- Belinda Hamnett as Kam's housemate
- Shirley Huang as Shirley
- Stephanie Chan
- Esther Koo
- Maggie Leung

== Music ==
Song	Singer	Language
Dance of a Dream (愛君如夢)	Andy Lau, Sandra Ng	Cantonese
Play Some Instruments, Dance a Little (彈彈琴，跳跳舞)	Andy Lau, Anita Mui	Cantonese
Wish You a Happy Birthday (祝你生辰快樂)	Andy Lau	Cantonese
Father and Son (兩仔爺)	Andy Lau, Anita Mui, Sandra Ng, Ronald Cheng, Gordon Lam, Cherrie Ying, Lam Chi-chung, Suzanne Chung	Cantonese
Big Reunion (大團圓)	Andy Lau	Cantonese
Do You Still Remember Me (還記得我嗎)	Andy Lau	Mandarin
Let's Dance (舞吧)	Andy Lau, Suzanne Chung	Mandarin
Whole (整體)	Andy Lau, Suzanne Chung	Mandarin
You Are the Best (你是最好的)	Andy Lau	Mandarin

== Accolades ==
Organisation	Year	Category	Nominee(s)	Result	Ref
21st Hong Kong Film Awards	2002	Best Supporting Actor	Gordon Lam	Nominated	
