= Saviour of the Soul II =

1992 Hong Kong film by Corey Yuen and David Lai

Saviour of the Soul
- Film poster
- Traditional Chinese: 九二神鵰之癡心情長劍
- Simplified Chinese: 九二神雕之痴心情长剑
- Directed by: Corey Yuen; David Lai
- Written by: John Chan; Kim Yip
- Produced by: Jessica Chan
- Starring: Andy Lau; Rosamund Kwan
- Cinematography: Lee Tak-wai; Jimmy Leung; Tom Lau; Bill Wong
- Edited by: Chun Yu
- Music by: Andrew Tuason
- Production company: Teamwork Production House Limited
- Distributed by: Newport Entertainment Ltd
- Release date: 3 September 1992
- Running time: 92 minutes
- Country: Hong Kong
- Language: Cantonese
- Box office: HK$13,972,114

Saviour of the Soul II (alternative Chinese title: 九二神鵰俠侶) is a 1992 Hong Kong martial arts action romance film directed by Corey Yuen and David Lai and starring Andy Lau and Rosamund Kwan. Although the film shares the same Chinese title as Louis Cha's The Return of the Condor Heroes, it is unrelated to the novel. It is also unrelated to the 1991 film, Saviour of the Soul.

== Plot ==
Ching Yan is a swordsman who has been dreaming of a beautiful woman every night for 28 years and he vows to find his dream girl. Ching Yan, along with his scientist godfather, Doctor, and godson, Tim, notice a HK$10 million bounty placed by the Devil King to find the Ice Maiden's Iceberg in order to obtain the Ice Maiden's qi, which grants immortality. Many people have ventured to the mountain in search of the legendary Ice Maiden, but none have returned. Ching Yan, Doctor and Tim set off a journey to the Snowy Mountain and stop at the Last-Stop-in-Life Hotel located at the base of the mountain. The innkeeper Ruby, develops a crush on Ching-yan as he resembles her dream lover. At the hotel, Ching Yan and Tim emerges victorious in games of snooker and slapjack respectively against Ruby and her employees using Doctor's various inventions before going up the mountain to look for the Ice Maiden.

On the way up the mountain, the trio enter a frozen cave where Ching Yan falls through a crack but he manages to find his way out and find the legendary iceberg not before witnessing a far view of his dream girl. While pulling the iceberg down the mountain, Ching Yan passes out due to fatigue and his dream girl, who turns out to be the Ice Maiden, saves him entering his dream where she is in dangers and triggers him to get up. The next morning, Doctor and Tim finds and reunites with Ching Yan and leave the mountain with the iceberg. On the way, they were ambushed by various seekers of the bounty but Ching Yan and Tim manages to fight them off while Doctor takes the iceberg away. Back at the Last-Stop-in-Life Hotel, Ruby unsuccessfully tries to entice Ching Yan and upset, she calls the Devil King and reveals the whereabouts of the iceberg.

The Devil King arrives at the hotel and Ching Yan fights off his minions but he is later sucked by the Devil King into his stomach but is stopped after the iceberg, which Ching Yan has carves into a sculpture of the Ice Maiden, comes to life. Ching Yan is mortally wounded and Doctor blames himself for wanting the bounty but Ching Yan claims he has no regrets as he finally saw his dream girl and dies after taking a photo with Tim. The Ice Maiden, who witnesses Ching Yan dying, revives him transferring her chi her, which grants him immortality puts her life on the line. Doctor and Tim, who is told by the Ice Maiden about her fate, hides her from Ching Yan when he awakes until he refuses to them eat. When he sees the Ice Maiden, she ages 200 years overnight, but Ching Yan love for her still remains decides to marry her.

On the night of their wedding, the Devil King kidnaps the Ice Maiden and Ching Yan raids the Devil King's palace. After defeating the Devil King's minions before engaging the Devil King in one final battle. During the battle, Doctor and Tim temporarily holds off the Devil King while Ching Yan revives the Ice Maiden the same way she revived him where she regains her youth. The Devil King then attempts to take the Ice Maiden's qi until Ching Yan finally kills the Devil King by impaling him with his sword. Ching Yan is heavily injured afterwards but the Ice Maiden brings him to the south pole where the cold temperature can prolong his life and they live happily together there.

== Cast ==
- Andy Lau as Ching Yan (程仁), an expert swordsman who has been dreaming of a beautiful woman since childhood and encounters her in real life on his journey to find the Ice Maiden's iceberg.
- Rosamund Kwan as Dream Girl (姑姑) / Ice Maiden (玉女), an immortal who has been entering Ching Yan's dreams.
- Corey Yuen as Doctor (博士), Ching Yan's godfather, an eccentric scientist whose latest inventions are invisible potion and a magnifying glass which can literally enlarge objects.
- Shirley Kwan as Ruby (露比), innkeeper of the Last-Stop-in-Life Hotel who has a crush on Ching Yan once seeing his resemblance to her dream lover.
- Lai Chi-lam as Tim Ching (程添), Ching Yan's godson and apprentice.
- Richard Ng as Devil King (魔王波旬), a devil who wants to obtain the Ice Maiden's qi and achieve immortality.
- Kim Won-jin
- Asuka Tamami as a gambling girl working for Ruby who plays slapjack with Tim.
- Jack Wong
- Choi Hin-cheung
- Fan Chin-hung
- Tsim Siu-ling
- Kong Miu-deng
- Chan Sek
- Adam Chan
- Hon Ping

== Music ==
Song	Composer	Lyricist	Singer	Notes
Love Is this Stupid (情是那麼笨)	Andrew Tuason	Andy Lau	Andy Lau	Theme song
Thank You for Your Love (謝謝你的愛)	Hsiung Me-ling	Andy Lau (Cantonese); Eric Lin (Mandarin)	Andy Lau	Insert theme
