= Tian Di =

1994 Hong Kong film by David Lai

- Film poster
- Traditional Chinese: 天與地
- Simplified Chinese: 天与地
- Hanyu Pinyin: Tián Yú Dì
- Jyutping: Tin1 Jyu2 Dei6
- Directed by: David Lai
- Written by: David Chan
- Produced by: Andy Lau; Daniel Yu; David Lai
- Starring: Andy Lau; Damian Lau; Cherie Chan
- Cinematography: Mark Lee Ping Bin
- Edited by: Fan Kung-ming
- Music by: Violet Lam
- Production company: Teamwork Motion Pictures
- Distributed by: Win's Entertainment
- Release date: 21 July 1994
- Running time: 106 minutes
- Country: Hong Kong
- Language: Cantonese
- Box office: HK$10,017,864

Tian Di, also known in United Kingdom as Chinese Untouchables, is a 1994 Hong Kong action crime drama film directed by David Lai. Set in the 1920s, the film stars Andy Lau as a Cantonese-born, Nanjing government investigator who has been appointed by the first Commissioner of the opium trade ban. The film was produced by Lau's film company Teamwork Motion Pictures.

== Plot ==
Cheung Yat-pang (Andy Lau), a Cantonese native who recently returned from France to Nanjing after further studies, has been appointed by the Chinese government to be the first Commissioner of the opium trade ban. He accompanies his wife, So-so, to Shanghai to outlaw illegal opium trade, but upon his arrival, a young boy tells him about the city's corrupt police force colluding with drug lords. Shanghai police commissioner Ngai Kwan organizes a welcome banquet for Cheung, where Ngai subtly threatens and bribes Cheung, who angrily walks out of the party after seeing many officials smoking opium and declares he will mercilessly crack down any drug user or dealer.

Cheung receives intel about a drug trade taking place at Zhabei brick mine and leads a raid there, only to realize it was a scheme planned by Ngai to trick him. Later, Cheung discovers one of his subordinates, Shantung Cat is addicted to opium and dismisses him, but Shantung Cat convinces Cheung he is his only loyal and only non-corrupt subordinate, and the two work together to confiscate and burn illegal opium, which angers drug lord Paul Tai, who retaliates by instructing Ngai to attack the pregnant So-so, causing a miscarriage. Furious, Cheung publicly punches Tai and accuses him of killing his unborn child.

Since many opium shop owners have had their goods confiscated by Cheung, Tai suggests that they start selling packaged cocaine. This is overheard by Cheung's newly assigned assistant, Jean Wu, who is working undercover in Tai's cinema. Jean informs Cheung about Tai's drug base in the Jiugong Mountains and Cheung raids the base with Jean and Shantung Cat, successfully killing Tai's henchmen and confiscating the drugs after engaging in a major gunfight. However, Cheung is later ambushed by Ngai's killers one night, where So-so is killed, while Jean is abducted by Tai and Ngai and interrogated regarding the whereabouts of the cocaine, driving her to suicide. Ngai abducts Cheung and injects him with drugs, forcibly taking a photo of Cheung smoking opium, which makes newspaper headlines, before imprisoning him at the police station. Shantung Cat, armed with a machine gun, shoots up the police station and holds Ngai hostage while rescuing Cheung, but Shantung Cat is captured while Cheung flees and defeats a few of the crooked cops. Before being killed, Shantung Cat manages to manipulate Ngai into suspecting Tai.

Cheung puts the confiscated cocaine in Tai's cinema, then lures Ngai there during the premiere of a new film. There, Cheung shows edited footage of Tai taking a shipment of cocaine for himself, which angers Ngai, who finds the cocaine behind the cinema screen and attempts to shoot Tai, but is instead killed by him. Tai orders his henchmen kill the cinema audience to silence any witnesses. Cheung, who is hiding in the projection booth and recording the incident on film, is caught by one of Tai's henchmen, whom he fights and defeats before trying to flee with the footage, and killing several more of Tai's henchmen. The main henchman Cheung has just fought gets up and attempts to strangle him, but Cheung throws him off the balcony, jumps down, and tackles Tai through a wall and a cinema screen. Tai survives, but plays dead in front of Cheung. Afterwards, Cheung hands the incriminating footage he's filmed to his superior, General Lee, and boards a train back to Guangzhou, where Lee bids farewell to him before shooting Cheung dead, saying he was born at the wrong time. In the end, it is reported to the public that Cheung committed suicide for fear of his crimes, while Tai is set free without any charges.

== Cast ==
- Andy Lau as Cheung Yat-pang (張一鵬), the main protagonist, a Nanjing government investigator from Canton who studied abroad in France and previously worked for the Republic of China Military Academy.
- Damian Lau as Paul Tai (戴濟民), the main antagonist, a Shanghai drug lord who poses as a philanthropist on the surface.
- Cherie Chan as So-so (素素), Cheung Yat-pang's wife.
- Ku Pao-ming as Ngai Kwan (倪昆), the corrupt police commissioner of the Shanghai police force who colludes with Tai.
- Chin Shih-chieh as Shantung Cat (山東貓), Cheung Yat-pang's assistant who is addicted to opium but is very loyal to Cheung.
- Faye Yu as Jean Wu (鄔君), Cheung Yat-pang's assistant who was a formerly a doctor.
- Hon San as Paul Tai's henchman.

== Music ==
=== Theme song ===
- The Love-Forgetting Potion (忘情水)
  - Composer: Chen Yao-chuan
  - Lyricist: Preston Lee
  - Singer: Andy Lau

=== Insert theme ===
- Melodious (纏綿)
  - Composer: Hsiung Mei-ling
  - Lyricist: Eric Lin
  - Singer: Andy Lau

== Box office ==
The film grossed HK$10,017,864 at the Hong Kong box office during its theatrical run from 21 July to 3 August 1994 in Hong Kong.

== Accolades ==
Accolades
Ceremony	Category	Recipient	Outcome
14th Hong Kong Film Awards	Best Original Film Song	Song: The Love-Forgetting Potion (忘情水) Composer: Chen Yao-chuan; Lyricist: Preston Lee; Singer: Andy Lau	Nominated
