= My Mother Is a Belly Dancer =

2006 Hong Kong film by Lee Kung-lok

- Traditional Chinese: 師奶唔易做
- Simplified Chinese: 师奶唔易做
- Directed by: Lee Kung-lok
- Screenplay by: Erica Lee; Hai Yan
- Story by: Lee Kun-lok; Susan Chan
- Produced by: Andy Lau; Lorna Tee; Wong Ching-po; Chen On Chu
- Starring: Kristal Tin; Gordon Lam; Moni Tung; Suet Lei; Amy Chum; Andy Lau
- Cinematography: Jason Kwan
- Edited by: Cheung Kin-hung; Daniel Yu
- Music by: Paul Wong
- Distributed by: Focus Films
- Release date: 9 November 2006
- Country: Hong Kong
- Language: Cantonese
- Box office: HK $233,918

My Mother Is a Belly Dancer (師奶唔易做, lit: "It's not easy to be a see lai") is a 2006 Hong Kong film directed by Lee Kung-Lok. It is part of Andy Lau's "Focus: First Cut" series, focusing on promising young directors from Asia. Andy Lau makes a cameo in the film.

== Plot ==
The film is a portrait of three "see lai", a colloquial term used in Hong Kong to describe wives, especially housewives, who are approaching or in their middle ages. Mrs. Chan (Amy Shum), who has a grown daughter, is a housewife who tends to be domineering of her husband. Mrs. Lee (Sydney Suet Lei), on the other hand, is meek, with a chauvinistic husband (Ken Tong) and a young son who is troubling her with his poor grades. Mrs. Wong (Crystal Tin) is a garbage lady who has to support a family of four daughters. Her doting tailor husband (Gordon Lam) is out of a job, and the family has to make ends meet nonetheless. Her life is thrown out of order when she is laid off her job.

Mrs. Chan and Mrs. Lee originally join the belly dancing classes held by foreign teacher Pasha (Pasha Umer Hood) out of curiosity. Pasha replaces their traditional dance teacher and many in the neighborhood are unwilling to learn the dance as they think it indecent. Before long, Mrs. Wong and single mother Cherry (Monie Tung), join them. Cherry is a twenty-something gold digger who nonetheless wants to find a father for her baby boy.

The belly dancing classes become the highlight of the lives of these women, as they try to cope with upheavals and stresses in their private lives. Mrs. Chan's husband has an affair with a younger girl and she is thinking of divorce, yet unable to take the definitive step to break with her husband. Mrs. Lee's husband objects to her classes and bars her from attending them, especially after her understanding mother-in-law faints after dancing too vigorously during a belly dance gathering. Mrs. Wong has to deal with the stress of having no income, even though her husband voices his support for her belly dancing. Cherry intends to end her gold digging ways and settle down with someone who can accept her baby son.

The film ends with each finding solution to her problem: Mrs. Chan accepts divorce after support from her grown-up daughter; Mrs. Lee reunites with her husband after moving out briefly; Mrs. Wong finds a new job; and Cherry discovers someone who cares enough for her and her baby son.

== Cast and roles ==
- Cheung Wing-Hong
- Amy Chum - Mrs. Chan (credited as Yan-mei Tam)
- Pasha Umer Hood - Pasha
- Lam Chi-chung - Cameo
- Gordon Lam - Mr. Wong
- Andy Lau - Adili (Cameo)
- Suet Lei - Mrs. Lee (as Sydney)
- Kristal Tin - Mrs. Wong
- Kent Tong - Mr. Lee
- Monie Tung - Cherry
