= A Fighter's Blues =

2000 Hong Kong film by Daniel Lee

- Film poster
- Traditional Chinese: 阿虎
- Simplified Chinese: 阿虎
- Hanyu Pinyin: Ā Hǔ
- Jyutping: A3 Fu2
- Directed by: Daniel Lee
- Screenplay by: Cheung Chi-sing; Daniel Lee; Lee Hau-shek
- Story by: Daniel Lee
- Produced by: Andy Lau; Derek Yee; Catherine Hun
- Starring: Andy Lau
- Cinematography: Venus Keung; Sunny Tsang; Thomas Yeung
- Edited by: Azrael Chung
- Music by: Henry Lai Wan-man
- Production company: Teamwork Motion Pictures
- Distributed by: China Star Entertainment Group
- Release date: 21 December 2000
- Running time: 105 minutes
- Country: Hong Kong
- Languages: Cantonese; English; Thai; Japanese
- Box office: HK$22,002,055

A Fighter's Blues (Chinese: 阿虎) is a 2000 Hong Kong drama film written and directed by Daniel Lee, produced by and starring Andy Lau. Lau, who displays profound emotions as a kickboxer who persistently pursues dignity and honorary value in the film, was awarded the Golden Bauhinia Awards for Best Actor for his performance. Released on 21 December 2000, A Fighter's Blues is Lau's 100th film role.

== Plot ==
After spending 13 years in jail for killing one of his opponents Chat Chai in the dressing room after breaking up the fight because of a quarrel with his girlfriend Pim, Mong Fu (Andy Lau), a washed up Muay Thai kickboxer returns to Thailand to look for his old love. Upon arrival in Bangkok, he finds out that she died and that he has a 14-year-old daughter. He finds the orphanage and meets his daughter and starts a relationship with sister Mioko who runs the orphanage. To clean his past, he challenges the current and more than 15 years younger champion, who wants to avenge Chai. In the end, Mong Fu passes away from his injuries during the fight, but not without gaining back the acceptance and the respect of his daughter and rest of the world, including the very fighter who fights him.

== Cast ==
- Andy Lau as Mong Fu
- Takako Tokiwa as Sister Mioko
- Intira Jaroenpura as Pim Nathasiri
- Dickens Chan as Mong Fu's coach
- Chan Man-yee
- Venus Keung
- Kam Loi-kwan as Mong Fu's cornerman
- Kowit Wattanakui as Sombat
- Samart Payakaroon as Chart-Chai Payakaroon (mistakenly credited as "Samart Tayakaroon")
- Apichaya Thanatthanapong as Ploy
- Niruj Soasudchart as Tawon
- Ekachai Waritchaaporn as Ray
- Peemachai Pengphol as Popeye
- Sagat Porntavee as Sagat
- Manunya Limsatain as Moon
- Chaleampan Junthong as Ann
- Bismillah Nana as May
- Thapakorn Maungkrang as Little boxer
- Juthaimas Changthong as Prae
- Gunyarat Maunboon as Jane
- Nutvara Hongsuwan as Alice
- Sirinthorn Kittisrisawai as White
- Natalie Stybert as Natalie
- Suchai Tigitnalerd as Thai commentator
- Philip Wilson as Ray's coach
- Visapas Puemsuotavee as Eagle
- Suwat Sfechompoo as Somar
- Nizondh Chaisirikul as Somar's coach
- Stephen Fox as Commentator
- Suchao Pongvilai as General
- Kowit Butrachart as Carlos
- Aroon Lam as Master Lui
- Kwok Siu-hang as Mong Fu's cornerman
- Reila Aphrodite
- Kowit Butrachart as General 2 (Uncredits cast)
- Visapas Puemsuovatee as General 3 (Uncredits cast)

== Reception ==
A Fighter's Blues was a box office success in Hong Kong, grossing HK$22,002,055 during its theatrical run from 21 December 2000 to 31 January 2001, making it the third-highest-grossing film of 2000 in the territory.

The film received mixed reviews and has a score of 56 out of 100 on Rotten Tomatoes, but was praised for the beautiful locations in Thailand, use of flashbacks, the acting of the main cast, and the editing of the fight scenes.

Andy Lau trained extensively in Muay Thai for his role as Mong Fu.

== Soundtrack ==
=== Theme song ===
- When I Met You (當我遇上你)
  - Composer: Jacky Chan
  - Lyricist/Singer: Andy Lau

=== Sub theme ===
- Smile (微笑)
  - Composer: Henry Lai Wan-man
  - Lyricist/Singer: Andy Lau

== Accolades ==
Awards and nominations
Ceremony	Category	Recipient	Result
6th Golden Bauhinia Awards
6th Golden Bauhinia Awards	Best Actor	Andy Lau	Won
6th Golden Bauhinia Awards	Top 10 Chinese-language Films	A Fighter's Blues	Won
20th Hong Kong Film Awards
20th Hong Kong Film Awards	Best Actor	Andy Lau	Nominated
20th Hong Kong Film Awards	Best Cinematography	Venus Keung	Nominated
20th Hong Kong Film Awards	Best Film Editing	Azrael Chung	Nominated
7th Hong Kong Film Critics Society Awards	Best Actor	Andy Lau	Nominated

== See also ==
- List of boxing films
