= Saviour of the Soul =

1991 Hong Kong film by Corey Yuen

- Film poster

Chinese name
- Traditional Chinese: 九一神鵰俠侶
- Simplified Chinese: 九一神雕侠侣
Transcriptions
Standard Mandarin
- Hanyu Pinyin: Jiǔ Yī Shén Diāo Xiá Lǚ
Yue: Cantonese
- Jyutping: Gau2 Jat1 San4 Diu1 Hap6 Leoi2
- Directed by: Corey Yuen; David Lai; Jeffrey Lau
- Screenplay by: Jeffrey Lau; Wong Kar-wai
- Produced by: David Lai; Jessica Chan
- Starring: Andy Lau; Anita Mui; Aaron Kwok
- Cinematography: Peter Pau
- Edited by: Poon Hung; Hai Kit-wai
- Music by: Anthony Lun; Tang Siu-lam
- Production company: Teamwork Motion Pictures
- Distributed by: Newport Entertainment
- Release date: 19 December 1991
- Running time: 98 minutes
- Country: Hong Kong
- Language: Cantonese
- Box office: HK$20,476,495

Saviour of the Soul (Chinese: 魔宮奇俠; released in the Philippines as The Good and the Bad) is a 1991 Hong Kong martial arts action film, directed by Corey Yuen, David Lai and Jeffrey Lau, and starring Andy Lau, Anita Mui and Aaron Kwok.

The film adapts elements from the Japanese manga series City Hunter, including its characters, but with a mostly different plot; the manga later received an official adaptation with Jackie Chan's City Hunter in 1993. Saviour of the Soul II was released in 1992, but both films are not related to each other. Saviour of the Soul is the first film produced by lead actor Lau's film company, Teamwork Motion Pictures.

== Plot ==
Ching (Andy Lau), May-kwan (Anita Mui) and Siu-chuen (Kenny Bee) are famous mercenaries who capture wanted criminals for a living. However, they are involved in a love triangle, as Siu-chuen is in love with May-kwan and has proposed to her, but May-kwan is in love with Ching and has been expressing her feelings for him all the time. May-kwan had blinded Old Eagle (Henry Fong), a member of the Green Dragon Society, earlier and he entrust his disciple, Silver Fox (Aaron Kwok) to seek vengeance on her by paying his disciple with his life. While picking up Siu-chuen's younger sister, Wai-heung (Gloria Yip), at a train station, Ching finally decides to propose marriage to May-kwan, but Siu-chuen is killed by the Fox while trying to save May-kwan, who then blinds Fox's right eye. Under the suggestion of her older sister May-wai (Mui in a dual role), May-kwan leaves Ching claiming she needs time to forget Siu-chuen, but to really keep him from Fox's wrath. However, Ching thinks of May-kwan everyday constantly seeks her by bugging her sister. During May-kwan's absence, Ching trains Wai-heung to be his assistant while also sharpening his swordplay skills.

On the night of Wai-heung's sixteenth birthday, the Madam of Pets (Carina Lau) is holding a martial arts contest to choose her husband and May-wai tricks Ching into believing the Madam of Pets is May-kwan. Ching enters the competition without an invitation card by knocking out the Madam of Pets' guards and proceeds to defeat the top competitor, Mr. Ford (Danny Poon), but the other competitors attempt to grab the Madam of Pets for themselves. During the chaos, Ching manages to remove the veil that the Madam of Pets covers her face with and realizes she is not May-kwan and leaves which upsets the Madam of Pets. Ching then confronts May-wai for tricking him but gets knocked unconscious when she shoots him with a Suffocate Bullet. She then unsuccessfully attempts to lure Ching to New York City before Silver Fox sneaks into her house and finds out where May-kwan is as he tapped her phone line before attacking her with his Thunder Bomb. Ching, who was hiding in May-wai's house to overhear her phone call with May-kwan, comes out and May-wai finally reveals to him that his sister has been living in the flat across from his.

Ching rushes to May-kwan and also calls Wai-heung over, but is a step behind Silver Fox. During their fight, Silver Fox inhales some Horrible Angel drugs and attacks May-kwan with by going through her body, which will turn her into Fox's slave in 24 hours. Ching arrives at this moment and engages in a swordfight with Fox and brings May-kwan to the hospital after fending him off. Wai-heung, who has a crush on Ching, hears May-kwan constantly murmuring Ching's name when the latter gains conscious and tells Ching the truth that May-kwan never loved her brother and was in love with him the whole time, and is heartbroken. Ching hugs May-kwan and finally expresses his for her love while the latter also expresses how much she missed him and knowing that her time is almost up, she tells him to destroy her when she becomes a Horrible Angel before falling unconscious again. Ching then bumps into May-wai who is treating her injuries inflicted by Fox's Thunder Bomb the hospital and forces her to reveal to him that the Madam of Pets is the only person that can save May-kwan.

Ching then brings May-kwan into the palace of the Madam of Pets and begs her to save his lover. However, the Madam of Pets is still upset at Ching and forces him to kneel through a trail of shattered glass which cut his knees. Despite fulfilling her request, the Madam of Pets still refuses to save May-kwan and Ching brings May-kwan home where he had turned on the gas pipes for it to explode when she becomes a Horrible Angel so they will die together and they embrace their moments together. However, Silver Fox arrives at May-kwan's flat capturing May-wai and Wai-heung and engages in a battle with Ching where is attacks Ching with Horrible Angel a couple of times before Ching snatches the drugs from Fox and inhales it himself. As Ching gains the upper hand, the Horrible Angel in May-kwan starts to take effect and Fox commands her to attack Ching. However, Ching is able to stop this by going through May-kwan's body with his Horrible Angel then lures Fox to his flat where the gas pipes he turned on explode. While Ching is struggling with Fox, the Madam of Pets and her followers arrive and save May-kwan from the explosion and also giving her the antidote to the Horrible Angel and claims to have save her so she will never be Ching, while in actuality she gave her an extra antidote for Ching, who survives the explosion as he took cover under a bathtub. Ching and May-kwan leaves and they roam the world together as a couple.

== Cast ==
- Andy Lau as Ching (逞哥), a mercenary who is a skilled martial artist and ace marksman, wielding a retractable sword, along with a magnum revolver as his sidearm. Although deeply in love with May-kwan, he has always been embarrassed to express his love for her.
- Anita Mui as Yiu May-kwan (姚美君), Ching's love interest who is a fellow mercenary specializing in throwing and uses explosive Super Daggers (砲彈飛刀), and Magnetic Tailing (金屬追蹤器), which attracts the daggers to the target.
  - also portrays Yiu May-wai (姚美惠), May-kwan's unfortunate older twin sister who considers Ching a jinx as she always gets hurt everytime she sees him. May-wai is also the inventor of Suffocate Bullets (窒息子彈), which shoots out fumes that can knock out the victim who inhales it.
- Aaron Kwok as Silver Fox (銀狐), the disciple of Old Eagle who was entrusted by his mentor to seek revenge on May-kwan and wages a personal vendetta against her when she blinds his right eye with a dagger. His most powerful weapon are Horrible Angel (恐怖天使) drugs which he inhales and allows him to go through his victims and transform them into his slaves in 24 hours.
- Gloria Yip as Wai-heung (惠香), Siu-chuen's younger sister who studied in Macau and a talented baseball player. After her brother dies, Ching trains her to be his assistant and she falls in love with him.
- Kenny Bee as Siu-chuen (小村), a mercenary who is Ching and May-kwan's associate and also an ace marksman, wielding a Desert Eagle as his weapon. He is in love with the latter and had proposed to her, but his feelings are not reciprocated as she loves Ching.
- Carina Lau as Madam of Pets (寵物夫人), a doctor who possess remarkable medical skills. She hides her face in a veil and would only reveal her face to a man that would marry her and is bitter towards Ching as he is the first man to see her face but refuses to marry her.
- Corey Yuen as Invisible Doctor (隱形博士) / Horrible Doctor (恐怖博士), a scientist who invented invisible chemicals, which gave him the former name, and the Horrible Angel drugs, which gave him the latter name. He only appears in the extended Taiwanese version where he hired Ching and Siu-chuen to transport and invisible guard snake of the Egyptian pyramids back home.
- Danny Poon as Mr. Ford (霍都), one of the competitors fighting to marry the Madam of Pets who was almost the champion until he was defeated and humiliated by Ching.
- Henry Fong as Old Eagle (老鷹), Silver Fox's mentor who blinded by May-kwan's and imprisoned after failing his mission to assassinate Princess Yuki for the Green Dragon Society. After Silver Fox breaks out of a maximum security prison, he entrusts his disciple to avenge him and repays the favor by taking his own life.
- Poon Fong-fong
- Maggie Chan as Elder Sister (婆婆), the Madam of Pets' second in command.
- Yip San
- Joanna Chan
- Matthew Wong

== Release ==
Saviour of the Soul was released in Hong Kong on 19 December 1991. In the Philippines, the film was released by First Films as The Good and the Bad on 23 September 1993; Andy Lau is credited in local posters as "Ricky Chan."

== Accolades ==
Awards and nominations
Ceremony	Category	Recipient	Outcome
11th Hong Kong Film Awards
11th Hong Kong Film Awards	Best Supporting Actor	Aaron Kwok	Nominated
11th Hong Kong Film Awards	Best Cinematography	Peter Pau	Won
11th Hong Kong Film Awards	Best Film Editing	Poon Hung, Hai Kit-wai	Nominated
11th Hong Kong Film Awards	Best Art Direction	Yee Chung-man	Won
11th Hong Kong Film Awards	Best Action Choreography	Yuen Tak	Nominated
29th Golden Horse Awards	Best Cinematography	Peter Pau	Nominated
29th Golden Horse Awards	Best Art Direction	Yee Chung-man	Nominated
29th Golden Horse Awards	Best Makeup & Costume Design	Shirley Chan	Nominated
29th Golden Horse Awards	Best Action Choreography	Yuen Tak	Nominated
