= Hong Kong Film Award for Best New Performer =

Annual Hong Kong industry award

- Awarded for: Performance by a new actor or actress
- Country: Hong Kong
- Presented by: Hong Kong Film Awards
- First award: 1983
- Currently held by: Yoyo Tse — Fly Me to the Moon (2024)

The Hong Kong Film Award for Best New Performer is an annual Hong Kong industry award presented to an actor or actress for the best performance by a new artist. The performance is often, but not obligatory, the debut role of the artist.

== History ==
The award was established at the 2nd Hong Kong Film Awards (1983) and the first winner in this category was Ma Si-San for her role in the film Boat People. There are 5, sometimes 6, nominations for the category of Best New Performer from which one actor or actress is chosen the winner of the Hong Kong Film Award for Best New Performer.

The HKFA for Best New Performer was sometimes awarded for a very young actor or actress such as Xu Jiao, who was only nine years old at the time of the award, or Ian Gouw, a nine-year-old Malaysian actor who won in both supporting actor and best new artist categories for his performance in After This Our Exile, and Sahal Zaman, a ten-year-old Pakistani-born Hong Kong actor who won this award for his performance in The Sunny Side of the Street. Many recipients of this award become famous figures of the Hong Kong film industry like Anita Yuen, Shu Qi or Cecilia Cheung.

== Records ==
Items	Name	Age	Film
Oldest winner	Alex Tsui Ka-Kit	66	Cold War
Youngest winner	Gouw Ian Iskandar and Sahal Zaman	10	
Oldest nominee	Patra Au	67	Suk Suk
Youngest nominees	Matthew Medvedev	1	Rob-B-Hood

== Winners and nominees ==
Year	Actor	Film	Ref.
1983 (2nd)	Ma Si-San	Boat People	
1983 (2nd)	Andy Lau	Boat People	
1983 (2nd)	Chow Sau-Lan	Teenage Dreamers	
1983 (2nd)	Cecilia Yip	Nomad	
1983 (2nd)	Pat Ha	Nomad	
1983 (2nd)	Irene Wan	Lonely Fifteen	
1983 (2nd)	Irene Wan	Happy Sixteen	
1984 (3rd)	Carol Cheng	The Last Affair	
1984 (3rd)	Hui So-Ying	Ah Ying	
1984 (3rd)	Tony Leung Ka-Fai	Burning of the Imperial Palace	
1984 (3rd)	Max Mok	Holy Flame of the Martial World	
1984 (3rd)	Yu Ka-Hei	I Do!	
1985 (4th)	Josephine Koo	Homecoming	
1985 (4th)	Loletta Lee	Shanghai Blues	
1985 (4th)	Lin Wei	Long Arm of the Law	
1985 (4th)	Cheng Lai-Ping	Pale Passion	
1985 (4th)	Maggie Cheung	Behind the Yellow Line	
1986 (5th)	Chan Yuen-Lai	Hong Kong Graffiti	
1986 (5th)	Michelle Yeoh	Yes, Madam	
1986 (5th)	Mark Cheng	Cupid One	
1986 (5th)	Billy Lau	Mr. Vampire	
1987 (6th)	Christine Lee	Just Like Weather	
1987 (6th)	Ng Chong-Chau	Just Like Weather	
1987 (6th)	Waise Lee	A Better Tomorrow	
1987 (6th)	Brandon Lee	Legacy of Rage	
1987 (6th)	Anthony Wong	Kiss Me Goodbye	
1987 (6th)	Ho Kai-Nam	Conduct Zero	
1988 (7th)	Law Kwok-Bun	Long Arm of the Law 2	
1988 (7th)	Ha Chi-Chun	Eastern Condors	
1988 (7th)	Tommy Wong	Prison on Fire	
1988 (7th)	Nadia Chan	Porky's Meatballs	
1988 (7th)	Yeung Ling	No Regret	
1989 (8th)	David Wu	Starry Is the Night	
1989 (8th)	Stephen Chow	Final Justice	
1989 (8th)	Vivian Chow	Heart to Hearts	
1989 (8th)	Sandra Ng	The Inspector Wears Skirts	
1989 (8th)	Ho Pui-Tung	Gangs	
1990 (9th)	Kwong Wa	Life Goes On	
1990 (9th)	Law Chi-Wai	Beyond the Sunset	
1990 (9th)	Lung Fong	Casino Raiders	
1990 (9th)	Pal Sinn	The Reincarnation of Golden Lotus	
1990 (9th)	Wong Kwan-Yuen	All About Ah-Long	
1991 (10th)	Rain Lau	Queen of Temple Street	
1991 (10th)	Hayley Man	Farewell China	
1991 (10th)	Jacklyn Wu	A Moment of Romance	
1992 (11th)	Jade Leung	Black Cat	
1992 (11th)	Song Nei	Fruit Punch	
1992 (11th)	Jackie Lui	A Boxer's Story	
1992 (11th)	Chan Tak-Hing	A Boxer's Story	
1993 (12th)	Anita Yuen	The Days of Being Dumb	
1993 (12th)	Sammi Cheng	Best of the Best	
1993 (12th)	Athena Chu	Fight Back to School II	
1993 (12th)	Koo Ming-Wah	Sex Racecourse	
1993 (12th)	Hung Yan-Yan	Once Upon a Time in China II	
1994 (13th)	Wu Xing-Guo	Temptation of a Monk	
1994 (13th)	Jay Lau	Days of Tomorrow	
1994 (13th)	Cherie Chan	Three Summers	
1994 (13th)	Jennifer Chan	Thou Shalt Not Swear	
1994 (13th)	John Tang	Yesteryou, Yesterme, Yesterday	
1995 (14th)	Alice Lau Nga Lai	I Have a Date with Spring	
1995 (14th)	Jordan Chan	Twenty Something	
1995 (14th)	Jordan Chan	He's a Woman, She's a Man	
1995 (14th)	Mavis Fan	The Private Eye Blues	
1995 (14th)	Peter Yung	The Final Option	
1996 (15th)	Eric Moo	Those Were the Days...	
1996 (15th)	Kelly Chen	Whatever Will Be, Will Be	
1996 (15th)	Chan Man-Lai	Fallen Angels	
1996 (15th)	Allen Ting	Summer Snow	
1996 (15th)	Gigi Leung	Full Throttle	
1996 (15th)	Françoise Yip	Rumble in the Bronx	
1997 (16th)	Shu Qi	Viva Erotica	
1997 (16th)	Daniel Chan	Hu Du Men	
1997 (16th)	Theresa Lee	Who's the Woman, Who's the Man?	
1997 (16th)	Kristy Yang	Comrades: Almost a Love Story	
1997 (16th)	Annie Wu	Police Story 4: First Strike	
1998 (17th)	Sam Lee	Made in Hong Kong	
1998 (17th)	Nicola Cheung	Cause We Are So Young	
1998 (17th)	Lam Bo-Lun	My Dad is a Jerk	
1998 (17th)	Ken Wong	Downtown Torpedoes	
1998 (17th)	Ruby Wong	Lifeline	
1999 (18th)	Nicholas Tse	Young and Dangerous: The Prequel	
1999 (18th)	Tony Ho	The Longest Summer	
1999 (18th)	Jo Koo	The Longest Summer	
1999 (18th)	Daniel Wu	City of Glass	
1999 (18th)	Yoyo Mung	Expect the Unexpected	
2000 (19th)	Cecilia Cheung	Fly Me to Polaris	
2000 (19th)	Cecilia Cheung	King of Comedy	
2000 (19th)	Richie Jen	Fly Me to Polaris	
2000 (19th)	Fann Wong	The Truth About Jane and Sam	
2000 (19th)	Yiu Yuet-Ming	Little Cheung	
2001 (20th)	Qin Hailu	Durian, Durian	
2001 (20th)	Edison Chen	Gen-Y Cops	
2001 (20th)	Candy Lo	Time and Tide	
2001 (20th)	Candy Lo	Twelve Nights	
2001 (20th)	Siu Ping-Lam	In the Mood for Love	
2001 (20th)	Leehom Wang	China Strike Force	
2002 (21st)	Karena Lam	July Rhapsody	
2002 (21st)	Charlene Choi	Funeral March	
2002 (21st)	Lawrence Chou	Merry Go Round	
2002 (21st)	Niki Chow	Dummy Mommy Without a Baby	
2002 (21st)	Zeny Kwok	Glass Tears	
2003 (22nd)	Eugenia Yuan	Three: Going Home	
2003 (22nd)	Wong Chun-chun	The Runaway Pistol	
2003 (22nd)	Wong Yau-Nam	Just One Look	
2003 (22nd)	Wong Yau-Nam	Hollywood Hong Kong	
2003 (22nd)	Kate Yeung	Demi-Haunted	
2004 (23rd)	Andy On	Star Runner	
2004 (23rd)	Kenneth Cheung	PTU	
2004 (23rd)	Po Luk-Tung	Hidden Track	
2004 (23rd)	Edwin Siu	Truth or Dare: 6th Floor Rear Flat	
2004 (23rd)	Vanness Wu	Star Runner	
2005 (24th)	Tian Yuan	Butterfly	
2005 (24th)	Teresa Chiang	Colour Blossoms	
2005 (24th)	Jaycee Chan	The Twins Effect II	
2005 (24th)	Eva Huang	Kung Fu Hustle	
2005 (24th)	Race Wong	Ab-normal Beauty	
2006 (25th)	Jay Chou	Initial D	
2006 (25th)	Fiona Sit	2 Young	
2006 (25th)	Annie Liu	Ah Sou	
2006 (25th)	Isabella Leong	Bug Me Not!	
2006 (25th)	Michelle Ye	Moonlight in Tokyo	
2007 (26th)	Ian Gouw	After This Our Exile	
2007 (26th)	Pei Pei	Dog Bite Dog	
2007 (26th)	Sun Li	Fearless	
2007 (26th)	Huo Siyan	My Name Is Fame	
2007 (26th)	Matthew Medvedev	Rob-B-Hood	
2008 (27th)	Kate Tsui	Eye in the Sky	
2008 (27th)	Wong Hau-Yan	Besieged City	
2008 (27th)	Linda Chung	Love Is Not All Around	
2008 (27th)	Wen Jun-Hui	The Pye-Dog	
2008 (27th)	Tsei Tsz-Tung	Protégé	
2009 (28th)	Xu Jiao	CJ7	
2009 (28th)	Juno Leung	The Way We Are	
2009 (28th)	Lin Chi-ling	Red Cliff	
2009 (28th)	Monica Mok	Ocean Flame	
2009 (28th)	Zhang Yuqi	All About Women	
2010 (29th)	Aarif Rahman	Echoes of the Rainbow	
2010 (29th)	Li Yuchun	Bodyguards and Assassins	
2010 (29th)	Buzz Chung Shiu-To	Echoes of the Rainbow	
2010 (29th)	Océane Zhu	Prince of Tears	
2010 (29th)	Fala Chen	Turning Point	
2011 (30th)	Hanjin Tan	Bruce Lee, My Brother	
2011 (30th)	Byron Pang	Amphetamine	
2011 (30th)	Jing Boran	Hot Summer Days	
2011 (30th)	Dennis To	Ip Man 2	
2011 (30th)	Dennis To	The Legend is Born - Ip Man	
2012 (31st)	Jam Hsiao	The Killer Who Never Kills	
2012 (31st)	Sheng Chien	Flying Swords of Dragon Gate	
2012 (31st)	Shiga Lin	Lan Kwai Fong	
2012 (31st)	Karena Ng	Magic to Win	
2012 (31st)	Zheng Shuang	Mural	
2013 (32nd)	Alex Tsui Ka-Kit	Cold War	
2013 (32nd)	Zhang Lanxin	CZ12	
2013 (32nd)	Sammy Sum	Lan Kwai Fong 2	
2013 (32nd)	Feng Wenjuan	The Last Tycoon	
2013 (32nd)	Jayden Yuan	Tai Chi 0	
2014 (33rd)	Babyjohn Choi	The Way We Dance	
2014 (33rd)	Du Juan	American Dreams in China	
2014 (33rd)	Fish Liew	Doomsday Party	
2014 (33rd)	Angel Chiang	A Secret Between Us	
2014 (33rd)	Kenny Lin	Young Detective Dee: Rise Of The Sea Dragon	
2015 (34th)	Ivana Wong	Golden Chickensss	
2015 (34th)	Jacky Cai	Aberdeen	
2015 (34th)	Ivana Wong	Break Up 100	
2015 (34th)	Ivana Wong	Delete My Love	
2015 (34th)	Candy Cheung	Dot 2 Dot	
2016 (35th)	Michael Ning	Port of Call	
2016 (35th)	J. Arie	Get Outta Here	
2016 (35th)	Sisley Choi	Keeper of Darkness	
2016 (35th)	Jessie Li	Port of Call	
2016 (35th)	Cecilia So	She Remembers, He Forgets	
2017 (36th)	Tony Wu	Weeds on Fire	
2017 (36th)	James Ng	Happiness	
2017 (36th)	Jelly Lin	The Mermaid	
2017 (36th)	Jennifer Yu	Sisterhood	
2017 (36th)	Hedwig Tam	Weeds On Fire	
2018 (37th)	Ling Man-lung	Tomorrow Is Another Day	
2018 (37th)	Larine Tang	The Yuppie Fantasia 3	
2018 (37th)	Stephanie Au	Love Off the Cuff	
2018 (37th)	Hanna Chan	Paradox	
2018 (37th)	Rachel Leung	Somewhere Beyond The Mist	
2019 (38th)	Crisel Consunji	Still Human	
2019 (38th)	Lam Sen	G Affairs	
2019 (38th)	Peter Chan	Three Husbands	
2019 (38th)	Nancy Wu	Men On The Dragon	
2019 (38th)	Adam Pak	L Storm	
2020 (39th)	Jackson Yee	Better Days	
2020 (39th)	E Jingwen	The New King of Comedy	
2020 (39th)	Vanda Margraf	Ip Man 4: The Finale	
2020 (39th)	Patra Au	Suk Suk	
2020 (39th)	Terrance Lau	Beyond The Dream	
2022 (40th)	Louise Wong	Anita	
2022 (40th)	Chung Suet Ying	Time	
2022 (40th)	Leung Chung-hang	Zero to Hero	
2022 (40th)	Mason Fung	Zero to Hero	
2022 (40th)	Will Or	Drifting	
2023 (41st)	Sahal Zaman	The Sunny Side of the Street	
2023 (41st)	Jer Lau	Mama's Affair	
2023 (41st)	Edan Lui	Hong Kong Family	
2023 (41st)	Edan Lui	Chilli Laugh Story	
2023 (41st)	Henick Chou	A Light Never Goes Out	
2024 (42nd)	Yoyo Tse	Fly Me to the Moon	
2024 (42nd)	Sabrina Ng	Say I Do To Me	
2024 (42nd)	Rondi Chan	Band Four	
2024 (42nd)	Hui Yuet-sheung	In Broad Daylight	
2024 (42nd)	Curtis Ho	Time Still Turns the Pages	

== See also ==
- Hong Kong Film Award
- Hong Kong Film Award for Best Actor
- Hong Kong Film Award for Best Actress
- Hong Kong Film Award for Best Supporting Actor
- Hong Kong Film Award for Best Supporting Actress
- Hong Kong Film Award for Best Action Choreography
- Hong Kong Film Award for Best Cinematography
- Hong Kong Film Award for Best Director
- Hong Kong Film Award for Best Film
