= 27th Golden Horse Awards =

Award ceremony for Chinese-language films of 1989 and 1990

- Date: 15 December 1990
- Site: National Theater, Taipei, Taiwan
- Hosted by: Chang Hsiao-yen and James Wong
- Preshow hosts: Timothy Chao and Tsao Lan
- Organized by: Taipei Golden Horse Film Festival Executive Committee

Highlights
- Best Feature Film: Red Dust
- Best Director: Yim Ho; Red Dust
- Best Actor: Tony Leung Ka-fai; Farewell China
- Best Actress: Brigitte Lin; Red Dust
- Most awards: Red Dust (8)
- Most nominations: Red Dust (12)

Television in Taiwan
- Channel: CTS

The 27th Golden Horse Awards (Mandarin:第27屆金馬獎) took place on 15 December 1990 at the National Theater in Taipei, Taiwan.

== Winners and nominees ==
Winners are listed first and highlighted in boldface.

**Best Feature Film**: **Red Dust**; Farewell China; Song of the Exile; The Swordsman; The Man from Island West; The Story of a Gangster	**Best Documentary Film**: **The Homeland of the Mangroves**; Formosan Macaque - Mao Mao Lien and Her Friends
**Best Animation** **No award given this year.** -	**Best Director**: **Yim Ho — Red Dust**; Yeh Hung-wei — The Story of a Gangster; Clara Law — Farewell China
**Best Leading Actor**: **Tony Leung Ka-fai — Farewell China**; Cho Sheng-li — The Story of a Gangster; Alex Man — Fraternity	**Best Leading Actress**: **Brigitte Lin — Red Dust**; Cecilia Yip — This Funny Thing; Carol Cheng — Her Fatal Ways
**Best Supporting Actor**: **Jacky Cheung — The Swordsman**; John Woo — Bullet in the Head; Yang Ching-huang — Fraternity; Chen Yi-da — Two Painters	**Best Supporting Actress**: **Maggie Cheung — Red Dust**; Didi Hsiao — The Man from Island West; Lau Yuk-chui — Queen of Temple Street; Siqin Gaowa — A Woman and Seven Husbands
**Special Jury Award**: **Hayley Man — Farewell China**	
