= 10th Hong Kong Film Awards =

1991 Hong Kong Film Awards

- Date: 21 April 1991
- Hosted by: Anita Mui and Philip Chan

The 10th Hong Kong Film Awards ceremony, honored the best films of 1990 and took place on 21 April 1991 at Hong Kong Academy for Performing Arts, Wan Chai, Hong Kong. The ceremony was hosted by Anita Mui and Philip Chan, during the ceremony awards are presented in 15 categories.

== Awards ==
Winners are listed first, highlighted in boldface, and indicated with a double dagger (‡).

**Best Film**: **Days of Being Wild**‡; Song of the Exile; A Terra-Cotta Warrior; Farewell China; Red Dust	**Best Director**: **Wong Kar-wai — Days of Being Wild**‡; John Woo — Bullet in the Head; Ann Hui — Song of the Exile; Clara Law — Farewell China; Yim Ho — Red Dust
**Best Screenplay**: **Chan Man Keung — Queen of Temple Street**‡; Sanmao, Yim Ho — Red Dust; Eddie Fong — Farewell China; Wong Kar-wai — Days of Being Wild; Wu Nien-jen — Song of the Exile	**Best Actor**: **Leslie Cheung — Days of Being Wild**‡; Stephen Chow — All for the Winner; Michael Hui — Front Page; Tony Leung Ka Fai — Farewell China; Jacky Cheung — Bullet in the Head
**Best Actress**: **Carol Cheng — Her Fatal Ways**‡; Sylvia Chang — Queen of Temple Street; Maggie Cheung — Farewell China; Gong Li — A Terra-Cotta Warrior; Carina Lau — Days of Being Wild	**Best Supporting Actor**: **Ng Man Tat — A Moment of Romance**‡; Ng Man Tat — All for the Winner; Jacky Cheung — A Chinese Ghost Story II; Jacky Cheung — Swordsman; Derek Yee — Kawashima Yoshiko; Liu Xun — Swordsman
**Best Supporting Actress**: **Rain Lau — Queen of Temple Street**‡; Hayley Man — Farewell China; Maggie Cheung — Red Dust; Carol Cheng — Queen's Bench 2; Rebecca Pan — Days of Being Wild	**Best New Performer**: **Rain Lau — Queen of Temple Street**‡; Hayley Man — Farewell China; Jacklyn Wu — A Moment of Romance
**Best Film Editing**: **John Woo — Bullet in the Head**‡; David Wu Dai Wai, Marco Mak — Swordsman; Marco Mak — A Chinese Ghost Story II; Marco Mak — A Terra-Cotta Warrior; Sammy Chow — Red Dust; Patrick Tam — Days of Being Wild	**Best Cinematography**: **Christopher Doyle — Days of Being Wild**‡; Ardy Lam, Wilson Chan, Wong Wing Hung and Som Chai Kittikun — Bullet in the Head; Jingle Ma — Kawashima Yoshiko; Jingle Ma — Farewell China; Peter Pau and Li Sun Yip — A Terra-Cotta Warrior; Poon Hang Sang — Red Dust
**Best Art Direction**: **William Chang Suk Ping — Days of Being Wild**‡; Yee Chung-Man — A Terra-Cotta Warrior; Jason Mok and Fong Ying — Kawashima Yoshiko; James Leung — Swordsman	**Best Action Direction**: **Tony Ching — Swordsman**‡; Yuen Tak — The Dragon from Russia; Tony Ching — A Terra-Cotta Warrior; Tony Ching, Lau Chi Ho and Wu Chi Lung — A Chinese Ghost Story II
**Best Original Film Score**: **Joseph Koo, Wong Jim** **and Romeo Díaz — A Terra-Cotta Warrior**‡; Shih Chieh-yung — Red Dust; Jim Shum — Farewell China; Wong Jim and Romeo Díaz — Swordsman; Tats Lau — Queen of Temple Street; Lo Ta-yu and Fabio Carli — A Moment of Romance	**Best Original Film Song**: **Composer/Lyrics: James Wong Jim • Singer: Sam Hui Koon-Kit** **— Swordsman**‡; Composer: Lo Ta-yu • Lyrics: Lee Kin Tat • Singer: Shirley Yuen — A Moment of Romance; Composer: Joseph Koo and Wong Jim • Lyrics: Wong Jim • Singer: Sally Yeh — A Terra-Cotta Warrior; Composer/Lyrics: Lo Ta-yu • Singer: Sarah Chen — Red Dust
**Professional Achievement**: **Peng Yen-Lien**‡
