= As Tears Go By =

As Tears Go By may refer to:

- As Tears Go By (film), a 1988 Hong Kong film
- "As Tears Go By" (song), a mid-1960s popular song written by Mick Jagger, Keith Richards and Andrew Loog Oldham that was a hit recording for the Rolling Stones and Marianne Faithfull
