= Kenneth Cheung =

Hong Kong actor

- 張滿源
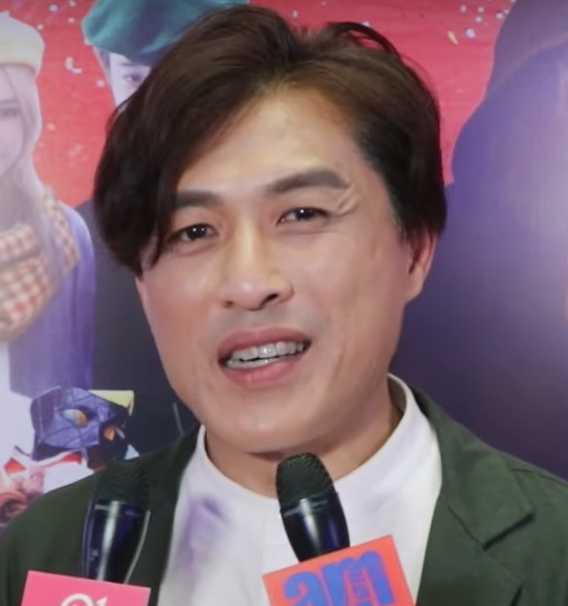
- Cheung in April 2023
- Born: Cheung Moon-yuen; Hong Kong
- Education: University of Sunderland (BEng); Hong Kong Academy for Performing Arts (BFA); China Graduate School of Theology (MCS)
- Occupation: Actor
- Years active: 2002–present

Kenneth Cheung Moon-yuen (Chinese: 張滿源) is a Hong Kong actor and Christian hymn lyricist. He is a cast veteran of Milkyway Image best known for his roles as Orderly in PTU (2003) and Mac in Sparrow (2008), and he earned a nomination for Best New Performer in the 23rd Hong Kong Film Awards with the former role.

== Early life and education ==
Cheung was born in a middle-class family with an elder brother. He developed a passion for acting at a young age after winning a championship in an acting competition. He initially planned to study acting at the Hong Kong Academy for Performing Arts, but his application was rejected. Cheung then moved to the United Kingdom and attended the University of Sunderland, where he obtained a Bachelor of Engineering in electronic system engineering. Upon returning to Hong Kong after graduation, he worked for a few years. However, his interest in acting persisted, prompting him to quit his job and reapply to the Hong Kong Academy for Performing Arts. During his university years, he received several minor roles in films and advertisements, including a governmental Anti-drink Driving Campaign advertisement in 2002, which later became an internet meme.

== Career ==
In 2002, Cheung landed a minor role in Johnnie To's romantic comedy film My Left Eye Sees Ghosts. To was impressed by his performance and invited him to join his next project, the 2003 action thriller film PTU. Cheung portrayed an orderly officer to Simon Yam's character and was nominated for Best New Performer in the 23rd Hong Kong Film Awards. After graduating from HKAPA with a Bachelor of Fine Arts in 2004, Cheung began starring in various films produced by Milkyway Image over the following years, most notably in the 2008 caper film Sparrow, where he shared the screen with Simon Yam, Gordon Lam, and Law Wing-cheung as one of the four leading co-stars. Cheung also took on film technician roles due to his expertise in digital systems.

In 2018, Cheung signed with ViuTV as an actor and appeared in the 2019 horror thriller series Psycho Detective 2 as the father of Neo Yau's character. In 2020, he left ViuTV to pursue studies in Hebrew at the China Graduate School of Theology, from which he graduated with a Master of Christian Studies in 2022. Prior to his theological studies, he had also worked as a Christian hymn lyricist and preacher. After completing his studies, he returned to the film industry and took part in several television series. In 2023, Cheung secured the role of Mr. Si in the black comedy film Over My Dead Body, where he delivered noteworthy performances, including several nude scenes that garnered positive acclaim from the public.

== Filmography ==
=== Film ===
Year	Title	Role	Notes/Ref.
2002	My Left Eye Sees Ghosts	Man in pub	
2003	PTU	Orderly	
2004	Breaking News	News anchor	
2008	Besieged City	Negotiator	
2008	Sparrow	Mac (小馬)	
2009	Night and Fog	Councilor Hung (洪議員)	
2011	Life Without Principle	Police officer	
2011	A Simple Life	Doctor	
2013	The White Storm	Plain-clothes officer	
2019	I Love You, You're Perfect, Now Change!	Wife-waiting man	
2020	Beyond the Dream	Joe	
2021	Elisa's Day	Wong Ming (黃明)	
2021	Drifting	Luk Man (陸萬)	
2022	Table for Six	Chen Hong's father	
2023	Over My Dead Body	Mr. Si (施先生)	
2023	Tales from the Occult：Body and Soul	Sam Yiu's father	
2023	The Goldfinger	Chung's lawyer	

=== Television ===
Year	Title	Role	Notes/Ref.
2019	Psycho Detective 2	Sima Sai Leung (司馬細良)	Recurring role
2019	Limited Education	School chancellor	Guest role
2019	MeToo	Si Tou Chak (司徒澤)	Recurring role
2022	In Geek We Trust	Smiley Lock salesman	Guest role
2022	940920	Yu Ka-chung's father	Guest role
2022	Inevitable	Mok Sing (莫成)	Guest role
2023	Beyond the Common Ground	Ma Chi Keung (馬志強)	Recurring role

== Awards and nominations ==
Year	Award	Category	Work	Result	Ref.
2004	23rd Hong Kong Film Awards	Best New Performer	PTU	Nominated	
