= 8th Hong Kong Film Awards =

1989 Hong Kong Film Awards

- Date: 9 April 1989
- Site: Hong Kong Convention and Exhibition Centre

The 8th Hong Kong Film Awards ceremony, honored the best films of 1988 and took place on 9 April 1989 at Hong Kong Academy for Performing Arts, Wan Chai, Hong Kong. The ceremony was hosted by Lydia Shum, Eric Tsang and Philip Chan, during the ceremony awards are presented in 14 categories. The ceremony was sponsored by City Entertainment Magazine.

== Awards ==
Winners are listed first, highlighted in boldface, and indicated with a double dagger (‡).

| **Best Film**: **Rouge**‡; Painted Faces; As Tears Go By; Gangs; Chicken and Duck Talk | **Best Director**: **Stanley Kwan — Rouge**‡; Wong Kar-wai — As Tears Go By; Jacob Cheung — Last Eunuch in China; Lawrence Ah Mon — Gangs; Alex Law — Painted Faces |
| **Best Screenplay**: **Lip Wang Fung, Siu Kwok Wah, Gordon Chan** **and Yip Kwong Kim — Heart to Hearts**‡; Alex Law and Mabel Cheung — Painted Faces; Eddie Fong — Last Eunuch in China; Eddie Fong — The Other Half and the Other Half; Chiu-Tai An-ping and Lilian Lee — Rouge | **Best Actor**: **Sammo Hung — Painted Faces**‡; Max Mok — Last Eunuch in China; Michael Hui — Chicken and Duck Talk; Leslie Cheung — Rouge; Andy Lau — As Tears Go By |
| **Best Actress**: **Anita Mui — Rouge**‡; Tien Niu — The Other Half and the Other Half; Maggie Cheung — As Tears Go By; Carol Cheng — Heart to Hearts; Cora Miao — Keep on Dancing | **Best Supporting Actor**: **Jacky Cheung — As Tears Go By**‡; Wu Ma — Last Eunuch in China; Stephen Chow — Final Justice; Eric Tsang — The Other Half and the Other Half; Alex Man — As Tears Go By |
| **Best Supporting Actress**: **Sara Lee — School on Fire**‡; Elaine Jin — Set Me Free; Prudence Liew — Law or Justice; Cora Miao — The Other Half and the Other Half | **Best New Performer**: **David Wu — Starry Is the Night**‡; Sandra Ng — The Inspector Wears Skirts; Ho Pui Tung — Gangs; Stephen Chow — Final Justice; Vivian Chow — Heart to Hearts |
| **Best Film Editing**: **Peter Cheung — Rouge**‡; Yu Sun and Kwong Chi Leung — Painted Faces; Peter Cheong — As Tears Go By; Fo San, Kwok Keung and Lau Kwok Cheung — Gangs | **Best Cinematography**: **David Chung — Painted Faces**‡; Andrew Lau — As Tears Go By; Bill Wong — Rouge; Peter Pau and Poon Hang Sang — The Story of Hay Bo; Bill Wong — Profiles of Pleasure |
| **Best Art Direction**: **William Chang — As Tears Go By**‡; Wong Yan-Kwai — Painted Faces; Pok Yeuk-Muk and Ma Kwong-Wing — Rouge; Lee Yan-Kong — Starry is the Night | **Best Action Direction**: **Jackie Chan's Stuntman Association — Police Story 2**‡; The Liu Clan — Tiger on Beat; Sammo Hung's/Jackie Chan's Stuntman Association — Dragons Forever |
| **Best Original Film Score**: **Lai Siu-Tin — Rouge**‡; Chung Ting-Yat — As Tears Go By; Chung Ting-Yat — Heart to Hearts; Lowell Lo Koon-Ting — Painted Faces; Law Wing-Fai — Profiles of Pleasure | **Best Original Film Song**: **Composer: Lai Siu-Tin • Lyrics: Edward Tang King-Sang** **• Singer: Anita Mui Yim-Fong — Rouge**‡; Composer/Lyrics/Singer: Chow Yun-Fat — Diary of a Big Man; Composer: George Lam • Lyrics: Keith Chan Siu-kei • Singer: George Lam — Starry is the Night; Composer: Law Wing-Fai • Lyrics: Richard Lam • Singer: Ho Ka-Lai — Profiles of Pleasure |
