= Tactical unit =

Tactical unit may refer to:

- Police tactical unit, a specialist police unit that manages and resolves high risk incidents including terrorism.
- Tactical Unit (film series), a series of Hong Kong films
