= List of Hong Kong Asia Pacific Screen Award winners and nominees =

This is a list of Hong Kong Asia Pacific Screen Awards winners and nominees. This list details the performances of Hong Kong actors, actresses, and films that have either been submitted or nominated for, or have won, an Asia Pacific Screen Award.

== Awards and nominations ==
| Year (Ceremony) | Award | Recipient | Result | Note | Ref. |
|---|---|---|---|---|---|
| 2008 (2nd) | Best Feature Film | Sparrow | Nominated | | |
| 2008 (2nd) | Best Director | Johnnie To; Sparrow | Nominated | | |
| 2008 (2nd) | Best Actor | Simon Yam; Sparrow | Nominated | | |
| 2008 (2nd) | Best Cinematography | Cheng Siu-Keung; Sparrow | Nominated | | |
| 2010 (4th) | Best Feature Film | Aftershock | Nominated | Chinese-Hong Kong co-production | |
| 2010 (4th) | Best Children's Feature Film | Echoes of the Rainbow | Nominated | | |
| 2011 (5th) | Best Feature Film | Let the Bullets Fly | Nominated | Chinese-Hong Kong co-production | |
| 2014 (8th) | APSA Jury Grand Prize | Blind Massage | Won | Chinese-French-Hong Kong co-production | |

- Nominations – 8
- Win – 1

== See also ==
- List of Hong Kong submissions for the Academy Award for Best International Feature Film
