= Tactical Unit (film series) =

Cantonese police procedural film series

Tactical Unit (機動部隊, kei tung bou deui) is a series of films produced by Johnnie To with studio Milkyway Image, featuring the adventures of two columns of PTU officers, the Kowloon West Police Station and its CID officers, of Hong Kong. The films are in Cantonese.

The film series spun off from the feature film PTU: Police Tactical Unit directed by Johnnie To. There are five sequels. Work on PTU had already begun before 2002.

== Series ==
Films in the series include:

International title	Traditional Chinese title	Cantonese title	English translation	Year	Director	Notes	References
PTU: Police Tactical Unit	PTU	PTU	PTU	2003	Johnnie To	Also called Tactical Unit: Into the Perilous Night Also called Police Tactical Unit	
Tactical Unit: The Code	機動部隊─警例	Kei Tung Bou Deui: Ging Lai	Mobile Tactical Unit – Police Cases	2008	Law Wing-cheong	This film is sometimes called PTU 2	
Tactical Unit: No Way Out	機動部隊─絕路	Kei Tung Bou Deui: Juet Lou	Mobile Tactical Unit – Road to Ruin	2008	Lawrence Ah Mon		
Tactical Unit: Human Nature	機動部隊─人性	Kei Tung Bou Deui: Yan Sing	Mobile Tactical Unit – Humanity	2008	Andy Ng		
Tactical Unit: Comrades in Arms	機動部隊─同袍	Kei Tung Bou Deui: Tung Pou	Mobile Tactical Unit – Colleagues	2009	Law Wing-cheong	This film is also called PTU 2 This film is also called Tactical Unit	
Tactical Unit: Partners	機動部隊─伙伴	Kei Tung Bou Deui: Fo Pun	Mobile Tactical Unit – Partners	2009	Lawrence Ah Mon		

The film series stars Simon Yam, Maggie Shiu and Lam Suet.

== Films ==
=== PTU ===
PTU has won many awards. In 2004, it won five awards at the ninth annual Golden Bauhinia Awards. It also gave Johnnie To a Best Director award at the 2004 Hong Kong Film Awards. The film has also been featured in many film festivals. It was shown at the 2003 St. Louis International Film Festival; It has a score of 57% at RottenTomatoes.com

The film focuses on the aftermath of CID Lo losing his service revolver, and the night that follows, with PTU patrols and rival criminal gangs seeing action on the street in the climax of the film.

=== The Code ===
The Code was featured at the 2008 Far East Film Festival in Udine; it is the first film spun off from PTU. The script for the film was written by Yip Tin Shing.

The film focuses on the aftermath of an unreported beating meted out by a PTU column on a person in a back alley that was caught on a camera placed by the Leisure and Cultural Services Department. The West Kowloon Police Station comes under investigation by an investigative committee of the police, as the film follows various members of the police with different motivations try to find the person who was beaten, to settle different goals, with a subplot of another member of the PTU having gotten into administrative trouble before the investigation began and having difficulty dealing with it.

=== No Way Out ===
No Way Out is the second sequel to the original PTU.

The film focuses on the mentally disabled Fai and his girlfriend, rather than the members of the PTU, and life in the Temple Street district. It follows Fai, as he is physically coerced to do things by the PTU, and two rival triads, and the resultant consequences and violence that is paid in return for those actions.

=== Human Nature ===
Human Nature focuses on the always-in-debt CID officer Tong, and his travails to try to repay the debt he owes a loanshark. With his feeble attempts to repay the debt, he gets himself entangled with a gang of killers from mainland China, who are out killing criminals to rob them of their money, and using an ideological basis to justify the killings as protecting mainland China from the criminal scum of Hong Kong.

=== Comrades in Arms ===
Comrades in Arm was featured at the 2009 Hong Kong Film Panorama in Brussels, the 2009 New York Asian Film Festival in New York City, the 2009 Zero em Comportamento festival in Lisbon, and the 2009 Fantasia Festival in Montreal.

The film deals with the rivalry of the two PTU columns commanded by May and Sam, as May has been offered a promotion, and Sam has been in the field much longer, and the actions of their commander, Ho in preferring May's column over Sam's in their PTU platoon. Their rivalry leads to disrupted interaction and communication when many PTU units are used in a search for a gang of criminals holed up on a forested mountain.

=== Partners ===
Partners is the final film in the series.

The film revolves around the criminal underworld of dark skinned non-Chinese, and discrimination by Chinese against the darker skinned non-Chinese, with the PTU and CID investigating a criminal plot by an Indian criminal kingpin.

== Knock-offs ==
In addition to the official entries in the series, as in Hong Kong tradition, other completely unrelated films have been given similar titles in order to take advantage of the fame and popularity surrounding PTU.

One of these is PTU女警之偶然陷阱 (PTU File – Death Trap) from 2005, written, produced and directed by Tony Leung Hung-Wah.

== See also ==
- Breaking News, a similar film by Johnnie To
