= 1992 RTHK Top 10 Gold Songs Awards =

Hong Kong music awards

The 1992 RTHK Top 10 Gold Songs Awards (Chinese: 第十五屆十大中文金曲頒獎音樂會) was held in 1993 for the 1992 music season.

== Top 10 song awards ==
The top 10 songs (十大中文金曲) of 1992 are as follows.

Song name in Chinese	Artist	Composer	Lyricist
暗戀你	Jacky Cheung	Shōgo Hamada	Gene Lau (劉卓輝)
但顧不只是朋友	Leon Lai	Masao Urino Kisaburō Suzuki	Richard Lam
長夜多浪漫	Andy Lau	Kyohei Tsutsumi Masao Urino	Thomas Chow (周禮茂)
我為何讓你走	Aaron Kwok	Anthony Lun	Calvin Poon Yuen Leung (潘源良)
瀟洒走一回	Sally Yeh	Chan Dai-lik (陳大力) Chan Sau-nam (陳秀男)	Lo-Jung Chen Wang Hui-ling
紅茶館	Priscilla Chan	M.Aoi K.Senke	Thomas Chow (周禮茂)
還是覺得你最好	Jacky Cheung	Kome Kome Club	Gene Lau (劉卓輝)
我的親愛	Leon Lai	Noriyuki Makihara	Gene Lau (劉卓輝)
容易受傷的女人	Faye Wong	Miyuki Nakajima	Calvin Poon Yuen Leung (潘源良)
真我的風采	Andy Lau	Zaam Teat-zoeng (斬鐵章)	Calvin Poon Yuen Leung (潘源良)

== Other awards ==
Award	Song or album (if available)	Recipient
Best C-pop song award (最佳中文流行歌曲獎)	我說過要你快樂	Anthony Lun
Best C-pop lyrics award (最佳中文流行歌詞獎)	真真假假	Poon Wai Yuen (潘偉源)
Sales award (全年銷量冠軍大獎)	真情流露	Jacky Cheung
Outstanding mandarin song award (優秀國語歌曲獎)	瀟洒走一回	Sally Yeh
Outstanding mandarin song award (優秀國語歌曲獎)	明明白白我的心	Jackie Chan, Sarah Chen
RTHK Golden needle award (金針獎)	–	Cheng Kwok Kong (鄭國江)
