= Besieged City =

2008 Hong Kong film by Lawrence Ah Mon

- Film poster
- Chinese: 圍城
- Directed by: Lawrence Ah Mon
- Written by: Leung Tak-shun; Frankie Tam; Ham Jan-yu
- Produced by: Dennis Chan
- Starring: Tang Tak Po; Wong Yat Ho; Wong Hau Yan; Joman Chiang; Jonathan Cheung
- Cinematography: Gavin Liew
- Edited by: Li Ka-Wing
- Production company: Big Pictures Ltd.
- Distributed by: Mei Ah Entertainment
- Release date: 22 March 2008 (Hong Kong)
- Running time: 96 minutes
- Country: Hong Kong
- Language: Cantonese

Besieged City (Chinese: 圍城) is a 2008 Hong Kong film directed by Lawrence Ah Mon. It has a Category III rating in Hong Kong.

Elizabeth Kerr wrote in The Hollywood Reporter, "[Besieged City] is a quasi-realist Hong Kong urban drama", and film critic Paul Fonoroff wrote that Besieged City was the "21st-century sequel" of Lawrence Ah Mon's 1988 debut feature film Gangs. The title refers to Tin Shui Wai, a satellite town in the northwestern New Territories of Hong Kong.

== Cast ==
Cast and roles include:

- Tang Tak Po as Ho Ling-kit
- Wong Yat Ho as Ho Chun-kit
- Wong Hau Yan as Panadoll
- Joman Chiang
- Jonathan Cheung as Chu Hin
- Dada Chan Ching as Ceci
- Joman Chiang as Yee-wah
- Sunny Luk

== Reception ==
Film critic Paul Fonoroff wrote, "The mixture of the realistic and theatric attains a consistency due in large part to the naturalism of its cast of screen neophytes, a quality that has always been a hallmark of Lau's youth films, most recently in Spacked Out (2000) and Gimme Gimme (2001)."

== Awards and nominations ==
Besieged City was nominated twice at the 27th Hong Kong Film Awards in 2008:

- Best New Performer - Wong Hau-Yan
- Best Art Direction - Yank Wong

== See also ==
- The Way We Are, a 2008 film directed by Ann Hui, set in Tin Shui Wai.
