= Final Justice (1988 film) =

1988 Hong Kong film by Parkman Wong

- Film poster
- Traditional Chinese: 霹靂先鋒
- Simplified Chinese: 霹雳先锋
- Hanyu Pinyin: Pī Lì Xiān Fēng
- Jyutping: Pik1 Lik1 Sin1 Fung1
- Directed by: Parkman Wong
- Screenplay by: James Fung
- Story by: Chung Hon-chiu
- Produced by: Danny Lee
- Starring: Danny Lee; Stephen Chow
- Cinematography: Choi Wai-kei
- Edited by: Robert Choi
- Music by: The Melody Bank
- Production company: Magnum Films
- Release date: 23 June 1988
- Running time: 95 minutes
- Country: Hong Kong
- Language: Cantonese
- Box office: HK$8,916,612

Final Justice is a 1988 Hong Kong action crime film directed by Parkman Wong. The film stars Danny Lee, who also served as the film's producer, and Stephen Chow in his film debut.

Chow won the Taiwan Golden Horse Awards for Best Supporting Actor. He would later go on to be the top superstar of Hong Kong.

== Plot ==
District Crime Squad Sergeant Cheung Tit-chu (Danny Lee) of the Wan Chai District has been a pioneer in the area, often establishing outstanding services. However, Cheung's tough handling style, has attracted many complaints towards him. Cheung's new superior, Chief Inspector Lo Tai-wai (Ricky Wong) is dissatisfied with him, accusing him of disobeying superior orders, while also frequently clamped by Cheung.

One day, criminal Judge (Shing Fui-On) is released from prison, and leads his former associates Bull (Tommy Wong), Chicken (William Ho) and Smut (Victor Hon) to prepare a major crime spree plan. Meanwhile, car thief Boy (Stephen Chow) regards Judge as his idol and willingly serves him, but in the course of a car theft incident, he is arrested by Cheung.

Unexpectedly, Judge and his associates use the stolen car to rob an illegal underground casino, killing some customers in the process. Boy is innocently involved in the robbery case. Moreover, Lo regards Boy as an accomplice to the robbery and charges him for robbery and murder. However, Cheung believes that Boy is innocent and is determined to find new evidence to overturn the false allegations.

== Cast ==
List of cast members
Actor	Role
Danny Lee	District Sergeant Cheung Tit-chu
Stephen Chow (credited as Stephen Chiau)	Boy
Shing Fui-On	Judge
William Ho	Chicken
Ken Lo	Kong
Tommy Wong (credited as Wong Kwong Leung)	Bull
Victor Hon	Smut
Ricky Yi Fan-Wai	Insp Lo
Chiu Jun-Chiu	Sgt Chiu
Wong Aau	pickpocket
Debbie Chui Yuen-Mei	Boy's girlfriend
Stephen Chang Gwong-Chin	Mr Cheng
Ng Yuen-Sam	lift passenger
Ernest Mauser	hostage
Ho Chi-Moon	gambling joint customer
Cheung Kwok-Leung	Dummy's thug
Fei Pak	policeman
Lee Wah-Kon	gambling joint customer
Wong Wai-Fai	gambling joint staff
Lam Ngai	gambling joint staff
Hung Tung-Kim (uncredited)	Kim
Shing Fu-On (uncredited)	Dummy
Chan Ging (uncredited)	truck driver
Law Shu-Kei (uncredited)	Schoolmaster
James Ha Chim-Si (uncredited)	Boli
Parkman Wong Pak-Man (uncredited)	ambulance attendant
Strawberry Yeung Yuk-Mui (uncredited)	Nancy
Chan Chi-Hung (uncredited)	hostage
Yee Tin-Hung (uncredited)	Dummy's thug
Lam Chi-Tai (uncredited)	Dummy's thug
Kenneth Smyth (credited as Kenneth Smy)	hostage (extra)
Lam Foo-Wai	Dummy's thug (extra)
Tong Pau-Chung	(extra)

== Awards nominations ==
Years	Awards	Categories	Recipients	Results
1988	25th Golden Horse Awards	Best Supporting Actor	Stephen Chow	Won
1989	8th Hong Kong Film Awards	Best Supporting Actor	Stephen Chow	Nominated
1989	8th Hong Kong Film Awards	Best New Performer	Stephen Chow	Nominated
