= Sarah Chen =

Taiwanese singer (born 1958)

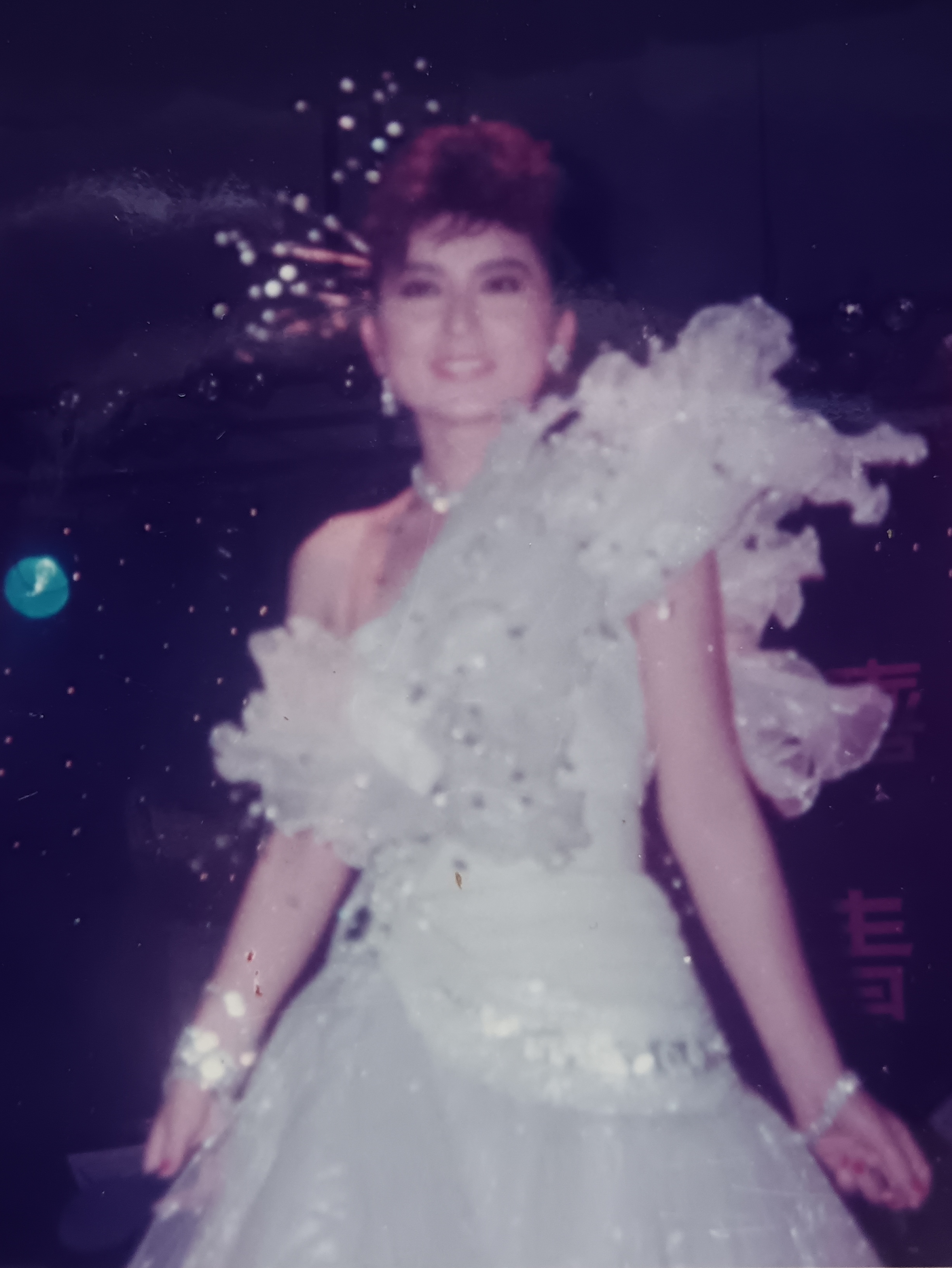
- Chen performing at the 1986 Malaysia Concert
- Born: 14 May 1958 (age 68); Taipei, Taiwan
- Occupation: Singer
- Years active: 1967–1998
- Awards: 2018 Singapore Press Holdings Chinese Radio 96.3好FM 80–90年代10大巨星; Top 10 Artists of 80-90s 2007 Singapore Television 25th Anniversary; Top 5 Most Favourite Songs "Samsui Woman" 新加坡戏剧情牵25 最受欢迎5大主题曲《红头巾》 Golden Bell Awards – Best Female Artist; 1985 Golden Melody Awards – Best Female Mandarin Artist; 1991, 1996

Chinese name
- Traditional Chinese: 陳淑樺
- Simplified Chinese: 陈淑桦
Transcriptions
Standard Mandarin
- Hanyu Pinyin: Chén Shúhuà
Southern Min
- Hokkien POJ: Tân Siok-hoâ
- Musical career
- Origin: Taiwanese (Taiwan)
- Genres: Mandopop; Ballad; Pop; Cantopop
- Labels: Seven Stars Records 七星唱片; Big Ocean Records 大三洋唱片; Haishan Records; EMI; Rock Records

Sarah Chen or Chen Shu-hua (traditional Chinese: 陳淑樺; simplified Chinese: 陈淑桦; pinyin: Chén Shúhuà; born 14 May 1958) is a Taiwanese singer who was active from the 1970s to the late 1990s. The recipient of the "Best Female Artist" award at the 1985 Golden Bell Awards and the 1992 and 1996 Golden Melody Awards, Sarah Chen was known for hit songs such as "Dream to Awakening" (夢醒時分), "Red Dust" (滾滾紅塵), and "The Mundane World" (笑紅塵). Chen released over 30 albums in her career, which included Mandopop, Cantopop, Taiwan MinYao, and English songs.

== Music career ==
Sarah Chen released her first single at the age of nine in 1967 with Seven-Star Records (七星唱片). She entered the professional music scene in the late 1970s with several record labels, including Big Ocean Records (大三洋唱片; 1976–1978) and Haishan Records (海山唱片公司; 1979–1982). Subsequently, she signed with EMI Studios Singapore (1982–1989) and later with Rock Records (1990–1998). Chen retired from public life following her final album release in 1998.

Chen explored various music genres such as Taiwan MinYao (民謠), Mandopop, Pop Music, and R&B. She is considered a critical link in Taiwan's music history, bridging the traditional Taiwan folk songs of the 1970s with the emerging Mandopop scene of the 1990s. Chen won Taiwan's Best Female Singer awards three times at the Golden Bell Awards in 1985, and at the Golden Melody Awards in 1991 and 1996. Her 1989 album Talk to You, Listen to You (跟你說聽你說) was the first to achieve one million sales in Taiwan. During the late 1980s and 1990s, Chen was known as the "voice of urban women" through her music. She was multilingual, recording tracks in Mandarin, English, Taiwanese, Cantonese, and Japanese.

Chen contributed to theme songs for various movies and TV series, including the award-winning "Red Dust" (滾滾紅塵; 27th Golden Horse Award) and "Samsui Women" (紅頭巾; 2007 Singapore Television Top 5 Original Theme Songs). Her collaborations included duets with Jackie Chan ("So Transparent is My Heart", 明明白白我的心), Jonathan Lee ("Walk Your Own Way", 你走你的路), Leslie Cheung ("Take for Granted", 當真就好), and Wakin Chau ("A Whole New World"，萍水相逢). Chen's contribution to songs performed by multiple artists include "Tomorrow Will Be Better" (明天會更好, 1985), "Happy Paradise" (快樂天堂, 1986), and "The Pearl of the Orient" (東方之珠, 1991).

Chen's voice was known by its clarity, power, and accent-free articulation. Colleagues described her voice as a rare combination of being clean yet surprisingly powerful. Songwriters like James Wong Jim (黃霑) sought Chen out for her ability to convey emotions accurately. Wong noted that Sarah Chen's rendition of the theme song for the film Green Snake made this song one of his finest works, its enduring popularity surpassing the film itself.

== Career timeline ==
Sarah Chen's music career spanned four decades, from the 1960s to the 1990s. Her collaboration with composers of various styles and her openness to exploring new musical directions resulted in a diverse discography.

=== Young Adult Years and First Breakthrough (late 1970s to 1982) ===
Chen's career took off in the late 1970s as her voice matured. Her early albums were produced under various labels, including Big Ocean Records (大三洋唱片公司), featuring Taiwan MinYao and ballads with tracks such as "I Am Quietly Waiting For You" (我在靜靜等你), "Mother, Where Are You" (母親你在何方), and "Night Jasmine" (夜来香). Transitioning to Haishan Records in 1979, Chen released a mix of Mandopop and MinYao and contributed to theme songs for various movies, including Road Home (歸程, 1980), Beauty and Sorrow (美麗與哀愁, 1980), and Spring Comes Again (又見春天, 1981). She also released an English album in 1978.

A notable album from this period was Sunset Follows Me Home (夕陽伴我歸) in 1982. The title track was a career breakthrough. This album also included several ballad and MinYao tracks, notably "Red Chamber Dream" (紅樓夢), which Chen re-recorded twice in the 1990s.

=== EMI Studios Singapore (1983–1986) ===
In 1983, Sarah Chen began a productive collaboration with EMI Studios Singapore, working with the composer duo Xiao Xuan (小軒) and Tan Jian Chang (譚健常). This partnership led to Chen winning her first major music award at the 20th Golden Bell Awards in 1985 for Best Female Singer, making her the 5th female singer to receive this award. EMI's global market brought Chen lasting international influences in Singapore, Malaysia, and Hong Kong.

During this period, Chen performed in both Mandarin and English and explored different genres. Her English album The Right to Sing (1983) introduced English classics like "Diamonds and Rust" to her fan base. Her Mandarin albums in 1983, including Starry Sky (星光滿天, 1983) and Song of the Ocean (海洋之歌, 1983), featured both Mandopops and Western and Mandarin renditions of English songs. The next year, Endless Love (無盡的愛, 1984) led to Chen's first Best Female Singer Award at the 20th Golden Bell Awards in 1985. This was followed by Wandering the World (浪跡天涯, 1985), which broke sales records at EMI, outselling Michael Jackson's Thriller in Malaysia. Her other work with EMI included a special New Year's Celebration album in 1985 and Black Hair Turns White (黑髮變白髮, also known as Love 情, 1986).

Chen also performed theme songs for popular TV series, such as "Samsui Women" (紅頭巾; 1986), which won the 2007 Singapore Television Top 5 Original Theme Songs Award.

=== Early Years with Rock Records (1986–1989) ===
In 1986, due to structural changes at EMI Studios, Chen's music production shifted to Rock Records while still under contract with EMI. This period marked her ultimate breakthrough in Taiwan's music scene. Considered the standard-bearer of Rock Records, Chen collaborated with producers like Jonathan Lee and Bobby Chen under the Artists and Repertoire (A&R) approach. Chen released several Mandarin albums: Waiting for the Storm (等待風起, 1987), Heart of a Woman (女人心, 1988), Tomorrow, Will You Still Love Me (明天，還愛我嗎, 1988), and Talk to You, Listen to You (跟你說 聽你說, 1989). She also released two English albums: Miracle of Love (1987) and Hold Me Now (1988). Chen's music during this period frequently reflected the independent mindset of women moving to urban areas of Taiwan. To support the image of a modern woman, Chen changed her public appearance, adopting new clothing styles and gender-neutral hairstyles.

Two albums were notable during this period. The 1988 album Tomorrow, Will You Still Love Me (明天，還愛我嗎) aimed to incorporate Sarah's personal life experiences, emotions, and personality into the songs. This was followed by the 1989 album, which was the first album in Taiwan to break the 1 million sales record. Although all tracks in the 1989 album were well-received, the first track, "Dream to Awakening" (夢醒時分), was pivotal for its success. The message of letting go of heartbreaks resonated with audiences of all ages and genders. Chen received a nomination for the Golden Melody Award Best Female Singer award for this work, though she did not win. Reflecting on this period during a TV interview in the mid-1990s, Sarah Chen recounted an encounter with a fan on the street, who tearfully embraced her, telling her, "You sang the words of my heart!"

=== Award-Winning Years with Rock Records (1990–1992) ===
From 1990 to 1992, Chen continued her success with individual music awards and new albums. However, health concerns slowed her down and the extensive effort invested in producing her first R&B album consumed three years.

In the early 1990s, Sarah Chen fell ill after taking a harmful weight-loss drug that was then popular in Taiwan. Despite health concerns, she released A Lifetime of Waiting (一生守候, 1990), which won her the Golden Melody Best Female Artist Award, and Be Wise, Be Easy (聰明糊塗心, 1991). In her 1992 appearance on Voice of Han, Chen discussed the origin of the title track for Be Wise, Be Easy, composed by her friend, the singer and composer Cheng Hwa-jiuan (鄭華娟). The song served as a gentle admonition and reminder for Chen to prioritize her well-being.

Chen also produced popular duets and theme songs for films and TV series. Her duet with Jackie Chan, "So Transparent is My Heart" (明明白白我的心), won the duo the Best Mandarin Song Award at the 1992 RTHK Top 10 Gold Songs Awards. Chen also sang the theme song for Red Dust (1990), a film starring actress Brigitte Lin, which tells a tale of lovers torn apart amidst the political upheavals of 1940s China. Chen and the songwriter Lo Ta-yu gave a live performance at the 27th Golden Horse Awards, where Red Dust won the Best Cinematic Music Award. Chen also produced popular theme songs in martial arts films, such as "The Mundane World" (笑紅塵), "Gate of Love" (情關), and "Questions about Love" (問). "The Mundane World", sung by the Kung Fu character Invincible East in The Swordsman series (portrayed by Brigitte Lin), starts with the declaration that "the mundane world is laughable, infatuation is most absurd, and seeing through everything is fine," capturing the universal wish to be carefree.

=== Career Wrap-Up (1992–1998) ===
Between 1992 and 1998, Chen released five albums. Sarah Chen's Taiwanese Album (淑樺的台灣歌, 1992) featured Chen's rendition of traditional Taiwanese songs. Chen described this album as her endeavor to preserve the cultural significance of traditional Taiwanese songs through her own interpretations.

The Dearest of Sarah (愛的進行式, 1994) was a compilation of songs that were dearest to Chen, featuring both new songs and her major hits such as "Dream to Awakening", "Red Dust", and "The Mundane World".

Forever (淑樺盛開, 1995), Taiwan's first R&B album, took three-years to produce, and Paradise Lost (失落園, 1998) also incorporated elements of R&B. These two albums opened up new musical directions for Taiwan's music scene.

Forever Sarah (生生世世, 1995) contained three new tracks alongside re-recordings of nine songs centered on themes of love, farewell, and passage of time. The title track won Chen her second Golden Melody Best Female Artist Award in 1996. After the release of Forever Sarah, Chen rarely made public appearances. One of her last public appearances was in 1997, when she co-hosted the Golden Melody Awards.

After her final album and her mother's unexpected passing in 1998, Chen withdrew from public life.

== Legacy ==
=== A Letter to Sarah and Peer Evaluation ===
In an attempt to bring Sarah Chen back into the entertainment industry, her former colleagues at Rock Records appeared in a documentary titled A Letter to Sarah (給淑樺的一封信), complementing Rock Records' 2003 collection of Chen's songs Herstory. The documentary highlighted Chen's naturally beautiful voice, which required minimal modification, a sentiment echoed by renowned musician Lo Ta-yu. Rock Records released some of Chen's live concert recordings as official versions, such as the 1992 Rock Records China concert featuring the song "Questions about Love" (問), to rival the quality of studio recordings.

Singer Wakin Chau noted Chen's critical role in Taiwan's music history, bridging the gap between the traditional Taiwan MinYao of the 1970s and the emerging pop music scene of the 1990s. MinYao composer Joseph Yeh regarded Chen as the female singer with the deepest understanding of Taiwan MinYao's cultural significance. Chen's musical repertoire was not confined to a single genre; she also performed English pop and folk songs and recorded Taiwan's first R&B album.

The 2003 documentary emphasized that Chen's contributions and achievements were unique and unlikely to be replicated. Unlike some singers who found success with one type of songs or during a particular period, Chen's success spanned multiple musical genres and different eras of the music scene. Chen Mei, manager at Rock Records, attributed Sarah Chen's success to her ability to transform Mandopop, English songs, Taiwanese songs, and R&B into distinctively Sarah Chen style renditions.

Singer Tarcy Su noted the difficulty other singers faced in performing Chen's songs. Chen Mei remarked that while some could imitate singers like Teresa Teng or Fong Fei-fei with some success, Sarah Chen's style remained inimitable. Sarah Chen's colleagues identified several factors contributing to her distinctive style: exceptional vocals, skillful articulation of the lyrics, deep cultural understanding, and a purity of heart untouched by societal complexities. This purity, according to her colleagues, radiated through Chen's music, making it uniquely enjoyable, modern and high-class. Efforts to safeguard Sarah Chen's image and legacy continue to this day.

=== Role as the "Voice of Urban Women" ===
Sarah Chen gained widespread recognition as the "voice of urban women" (都市女子代言人) following the release of three albums in the late 1980s: Heart of a Woman (女人心, 1988), Tomorrow, Will You Still Love Me (明天，還愛我嗎？, 1988), and Talk to You, Listen to You (跟你說，聽你說, 1989). These albums deviated from conventional love songs that depicted women as emotionally dependent on men, instead capturing the independent mindset of modern women. Several tracks portrayed women as self-reliant, equalizing the genders in their perceived emotional needs.

Broadcaster Ma Shihfang noted that Chen's rise in the late 1980s coincided with a period when more women were relocating to urban areas in Taiwan to pursue white-collar careers. Despite being just as capable as men, they often had to work harder and make personal sacrifices. Sarah Chen embodied this demographic, and her songs such as "Dream to Awakening" offered solace to her audience as they navigated personal challenges. In a 2003 interview, Tarcy Su credited Sarah Chen with sparking a new era for independently minded female artists in Taiwan's music scene.

Colleagues offered varying degrees of credit to Sarah Chen for her success in this role. Singer Wakin Chau compared the collaboration between Sarah Chen and Rock Records to a "chicken and egg" scenario, indicating that the collaboration would not have succeeded without her. Bobby Chen echoed this sentiment, stating "We were very lucky to have worked with Sarah Chen. The truth is, she had walked a long way by herself before coming to us. She was much more established than any of us, yet she still preserved that level of purity in her temperament."

While recognizing Sarah Chen's importance, Jonathan Lee emphasized the contributions of the producers, stating that Sarah "fulfilled my dream," and although not always willing, she "tried hard to fit the role." Lee said that the two preceding albums in 1988 succeeded in "completely washing away Sarah's past," making her portrayal as an urban woman acceptable to her 1980s-1990s audience for "Dream to Awakening" (夢醒時分). However, "Dream to Awakening" is not necessarily tied to the societal needs of 1980s-1990s Taiwan or Chen's personal transformation, as its popularity persists into the 21st century.

=== Awards Since Retirement ===
During an interview with Shanghai Television in 1993, Sarah Chen expressed her aspiration to create timeless songs, akin to certain English classics. Decades after her retirement, Chen's songs have continued to receive awards, including:

- In 2007, "Samsui Women" (紅頭巾, 1986) was awarded Top 5 Theme Songs for the past 25 years at the inaugural Singapore Mediacorp 8 Chinese Drama 25 Years.
- From 2014 to 2019, Chen's songs were voted into "The Top 1000 Mandarin Hits of All Time" list by listeners of UFM100.3 .
- In 2018, Sarah Chen was voted one of the "Top 10 Mandarin Hits Female Artists of All Time" (十大巨星) by listeners of 96.3 Hao FM.
- In 2019, listeners of FM96.3 in Singapore voted Chen's songs into top four in four categories:
  - "So Transparent is My Heart 明明白白我的心" won 2nd place in "Classic Duets 情歌對唱";
  - "Sunset Follows me Home 夕陽伴我歸" won 3rd place in "Taiwan Ballad/MinYao 臺灣民謠"
  - "Dream Awakening 夢醒時分" won 4th place in "Best of 80s 熱門80"
  - "Is it Right to Love You? 這樣愛你對不對" won 4th place in "Top 90s 輝煌90".

=== Retirement and Final Interview ===
Sarah Chen was among the few Taiwanese singers who quietly exited the entertainment industry. In her final public radio interview in 2003 with Matilda Tao, Chen expressed interest in a potential return but acknowledged complications in her life needing attention first. Her continued interest in music echoed her earlier interviews before retirement. During a 1992 radio interview with ICN Chinese American Voice, Chen, who had faced immense pressure and health issues, affirmed she would choose a music career again. She elaborated on her passion for music since a very young age and her belief that music permeated every corner of people's lives. Chen hoped that her songs could offer a few minutes of solace amidst life's challenges.

Despite efforts by Lo Ta-yu, Jonathen Lee, and others to attract Chen's return, she did not make a comeback. She declined Lee's emotional plea to reemerge at a 2006 concert in her hometown and was notably absent from Rock Records' 30-year anniversary celebration in 2010. Similarly, she did not participate in the re-recording of "Happy Paradise" in 2021, despite the return of many original singers.

== Personal life ==
Born in Taipei, Sarah Chen was the fourth child in a family of four sisters and one brother. Her parents, educated in Japan, adhered to traditional and strict family rules. Since entering the music scene at age nine, Sarah Chen received steadfast support from her mother, who acted as her manager and business partner.

As she grew older, Sarah Chen faced significant pressure from workplace and society to marry. She maintained strictly professional relationships with her male colleagues and sometimes sought her mother's help in rebuffing unwanted attention. This led to backlash against both of them. During a 1990 radio interview with Liu Jie, Chen expressed her wish for gender equality and personal space in marriage, acknowledging that in the male-dominated Taiwanese culture, finding a "Mr. Right" who would respect her wishes was unlikely. In her final phone interview in 2003, Chen indicated that she remained single.

== Discography ==
Sarah Chen recorded approximately 420 songs in her career, including 4 English albums featuring primarily cover songs and about 30 Mandarin albums and several singles. Her original solo albums include the following.

- Chinese: 愛的太陽 (Haishan Records); lit. 'Love's Sun' (1973)
- Chinese: 再會吧！心上人 (Big Ocean Records); lit. 'See You Again My Love' (1976)
- Chinese: 寒雨曲 (Big Ocean Records); lit. 'Chilly Rain Songs' (1977)
- Chinese: 悄悄地說再見 (Big Ocean Records); lit. 'Quietly Saying Good-Bye' (1977)
- Chinese: 飄雲。落花。愛 (Polydor Records); lit. 'Flying Snow - Falling Flowers - Love' (1978)
- 陳淑樺 西洋歌曲; 'Sarah Chen's English Songs' (1978; English)
- Chinese: 自由女神哭泣了 (Haishan Records); lit. 'The Statue of Liberty Is Crying' (1979)
- Chinese: 寧靜海 (Haishan Records); lit. 'Calm Ocean' (1979)
- Chinese: 歸程 (Haishan Records); lit. 'Road Home' (1980)
- Chinese: 美麗與哀愁 (Haishan Records); lit. 'Beauty And Sorrow' (1980)
- Chinese: 又見春天 (Haishan Records); lit. 'Spring Comes Again' (1981)
- Chinese: 夕陽伴我歸 (Haishan Records); lit. 'Sunset Follows Me Home' (1982)
- Chinese: 她的名字是愛 (Haishan Records) Love is Her Name (1982)
- Chinese: 星光滿天/口琴的故事 (EMI); lit. 'Starry Sky / Story of the Harmonica' (1983)
- Chinese: 海洋之歌 (EMI); lit. 'Song of the Ocean' (1983)
- The Right to Sing (EMI; 1983; English)
- Chinese: 無盡的愛 (EMI); lit. 'Endless Love' (1984)
- Chinese: 浪跡天涯 (EMI); lit. 'Wandering the World' (1984/1985)
- 陳淑樺賀年專輯; 'Sarah Chen's Lunar New Year Celebration Special' (1985)
- Chinese: 情/黑髮變白髮 (EMI); lit. 'Love / Black Hair Turns White' (1986)
- Chinese: 紅頭巾 (EMI) Samsui Women 《新廣連續劇主題曲及片尾曲》; 'Theme Songs for "Samsui Women' (1986)
- Chinese: 等待風起 (EMI/Rock Records); lit. 'Waiting for the Storm' (1987)
- Miracle of Love (EMI/Rock Records; 1987; English)
- Chinese: 女人心 (EMI/Rock Records); lit. 'Heart of a Woman' (1988)
- Chinese: 明天，還愛我嗎？(EMI/Rock Records); lit. 'Tomorrow', 'Will You Still Love Me?' (1988)
- Hold Me Now (EMI/Rock Records; 1988; English)
- Chinese: 跟你說，聽你說 (Rock Records); lit. 'Talk to You', 'Listen to You' (1989)
- Chinese: 一生守候 (Rock Records); lit. 'A Lifetime of Waiting' (1990)
- Chinese: 聰明糊塗心 (Rock Records); lit. 'Be Wise', 'Be Easy' (1991)
- Chinese: 淑樺的台灣歌 (Rock Records); lit. 'Sarah Chen's Taiwanese Songs' (1992; Taiwanese)
- Chinese: 愛的進行式 (Rock Records) The Dearest of Sarah (1994)
- Chinese: 淑樺盛開 (Rock Records) Forever (1995)
- Chinese: 生生世世 (Rock Records) Forever, Sarah (1995)
- Chinese: 失樂園 (Rock Records) Paradise Lost (1998)
