= Gangs (film) =

1988 Hong Kong film by Lawrence Ah Mon

- Film poster
- Chinese: 童黨
- Directed by: Lawrence Ah Mon
- Written by: Chan Man-Keung
- Produced by: Fu Qi
- Starring: Ricky Ho Pui Tung; Eleven Leung Sap Yat; Ma Hin Ting; Tse Wai Kit; Karel Wong Chi Yeung
- Cinematography: Chan Kwan-Kin
- Edited by: Lawrence Ah Mon; Fo San; Kwok Keung
- Music by: Joseph Kung Shing Chow
- Production company: Sil-Metropole Organisation
- Release date: April 7, 1988 (Hong Kong)
- Running time: 98 minutes
- Country: Hong Kong
- Language: Cantonese

Gangs is a 1988 Hong Kong film directed by Lawrence Ah Mon. It was Lawrence Ah Mon's debut feature film.

== Cast and roles ==
- Ricky Ho Pui Tung
- Eleven Leung Sap Yat
- Ma Hin Ting
- Tse Wai Kit
- Karel Wong Chi Yeung
- Lee Ho Ban
- Chan Tsung

== Reception ==
Film critic Paul Fonoroff wrote, "Gangs [was] a milestone in Hong Kong cinematic neorealism and one of the more affecting probes into the city's adolescent gang culture" and that the 2008 film Besieged City by Lawrence Ah Mon was its "21st-century sequel".

=== Awards and nominations ===
Gangs was nominated four times at the 8th Hong Kong Film Awards in 1989:

- Best Film
- Best Director - Lawrence Ah Mon
- Best New Performer - Ho Pui Tung
- Best Editing - Fo San, Kwok Keung and Lau Kwok Cheung
