= Christine Lee (actress) =

Film actress from Hong Kong, won award in 1987 for role in "Just Like Weather"

Christine Lee Yuk-guen (Chinese: 利玉娟) is a Hong Kong actress. She won the Hong Kong Film Award for Best New Performer in 1987 for her role in Just Like Weather, starring opposite Chan Hung-nin (陳鴻年) as a wife on the verge of divorce with her husband over her opposition to his desire to emigrate to the United States.
