= Tactical Unit – Comrades in Arms =

2009 Hong Kong film by Law Wing-cheong

Tactical Unit: Comrades in Arms
- Film poster
- Directed by: Law Wing-Cheong
- Written by: Yau Nai-Hoi; Au Kin-Yee
- Produced by: Johnnie To
- Starring: Simon Yam; Maggie Shiu; Lam Suet
- Cinematography: Cheng Siu-Keung; To Hung Mo
- Edited by: Law Wing-Cheong; Allen Leung
- Production companies: Universe Entertainment; Milkyway Image
- Distributed by: Universe Films Distribution Company
- Release date: 8 January 2009
- Running time: 91 minutes
- Country: Hong Kong
- Language: Cantonese
- Box office: $506,367

Tactical Unit: Comrades in Arms (simplified Chinese: 机动部队 - 同袍; traditional Chinese: 機動部隊 - 同袍) is a 2009 Hong Kong neo-noir action thriller film directed by Law Wing-Cheong. This film is also called "PTU 2", in reference to the first film in the series, PTU, though it is not the second entry in the Tactical Unit series.

Comrades in Arms has been featured in the 2009 Hong Kong Film Panorama in Brussels, the 2009 New York Asian Film Festival of New York City, the 2009 Zero em Comportamento festival of Lisbon, and the 2009 Fantasia Festival of Montreal.

== Plot ==
As a front-line police officer, you never leave a brother behind or bite a brother's behind... Tactical Unit Column Sergeant Sam (Simon Yam) and May (Maggie Siu) have been working together for some time but have never got along well. May is promoted recently as she always wins praise from her supervisor, whereas Sam is shut out from any chance of promotion. As a result, their column's morale drops to all-time low. A daring bank heist takes the tactical unit to Hong Kong's remote mountains searching for armed bandits. As Sam and May lead their team to conduct sweeps amidst treacherous terrain and deadly ambushes, they understand the only way to survive the mission is if they stick together as one.

== Cast ==
- Simon Yam - Sergeant Sam
- Maggie Shiu - Station Sergeant May
- Lam Suet - Senior Police Officer Fat Lo
- Samuel Pang - Roy
- Vincent Sze (Cow)
- Ben Wong - Senior Inspector Ho
- Teddy Lin
- Tommy Yuen
- Lam King Kong
- Lam Diy Kuen
- Wong Chi Wai
- Cheung Wing Cheung
- Hon Chun
- Lee Gin Hing
- Luk Man Wai
- Ma Chao
- Wong Gwan Hong
- Jack Wong Wai Leung
- Wong Wa Wo

== Production ==
Several scenes of the film were shot at St. Joseph's Church in Ma On Shan Village.

== Release ==
Comrades in Arms was released in theaters on 8 January 2009. The film was released on DVD and VCD on 17 April 2009.

== Awards and nominations ==
16th Hong Kong Film Critics Society Award

- Film of Merit

== See also ==
- Tactical Unit (film series)

Preceded by Tactical Unit - Human Nature	Tactical Unit (film series) sequels to PTU (film)	Succeeded by Tactical Unit - Partners
