= Fly Me to the Moon (2023 film) =

2023 Hong Kong film by Sasha Chuk

- Theatrical release poster
- Traditional Chinese: 但願人長久
- Literal meaning: Wishing The Man with Longevity
- Jyutping: Daan^{6} Jyun^{6} Jan^{4} Coeng^{4} Gau^{2}
- Directed by: Sasha Chuk
- Screenplay by: Sasha Chuk
- Produced by: Stanley Kwan; Jun Li
- Starring: Sasha Chuk; Angela Yuen; Wu Kang-ren
- Cinematography: Allan Chan; Ho Yuk-fai
- Edited by: William Chang; Yeung King-lun; Lai Kwun-tung
- Music by: Dominique Charpentier
- Production companies: Create Hong Kong; Flow of Words
- Distributed by: Golden Scene
- Release dates: 23 October 2023 (Tokyo); 11 April 2024 (Hong Kong)
- Running time: 113 minutes
- Country: Hong Kong
- Languages: Cantonese; Mandarin; Hunanese
- Budget: HK$5 million

Fly Me to the Moon (Chinese: 但願人長久) is a 2023 Hong Kong family drama film directed and written by Sasha Chuk, and produced by Stanley Kwan and Jun Li. Chuk also stars in a lead role, alongside Angela Yuen and Wu Kang-ren, as a Hunanese girl who immigrated to Hong Kong at a young age and faces poverty, discrimination and family issues.

The film had its world premiere at the 36th Tokyo International Film Festival on 23 October 2023, and was theatrically released on 11 April 2024 in Hong Kong. It received six nominations in the 30th Hong Kong Film Critics Society Award, with Sasha Chuk winning Best Screenplay and Wu Kang-ren winning Best Actor.

== Plot ==
In 1997, Lam Tsz-yuen, a seven-year-old Hunanese girl, migrates to Hong Kong with her mother to reunite with her father, Kok-man, who had previously smuggled himself into Hong Kong and became a thief. However, due to her status as a mainland immigrant, she faces bullying at school and has a difficult childhood. One day, Yuen's father notices her eyeing a pack of candy and steals it from a store for her. Influenced by her father, Yuen steals a watch from a classmate but is discovered by her mother. Enraged, Yuen's mother blames Kok-man for his bad influence on Yuen due to his stealing and continuous drug use. The tension between Kok-man and his wife eases when Yuen's younger sister, Lam Tsz-kuet, also migrates to Hong Kong and reunites with the family. However, their happiness is short-lived as Kok-man is arrested for drug trafficking, leaving his wife to raise their two daughters alone for the next ten years while he is in jail.

In 2007, Kok-man is released from prison. Yuen and Kuet have already learned Cantonese and integrated well at school. Yuen has to work part-time to earn money and enters into a relationship with a boy named Sky who steals candy for her from a convenience store. Meanwhile, Kuet witnesses her classmates discriminating against and bullying a mainland immigrant classmate. Fearing being looked down upon by her peers, Kuet steals money from her sister to buy new trousers for a school trip. When Yuen discovers her money was stolen, she immediately accuses her father of taking it. This leads to a heated argument between Kok-man and Yuen. Although Kuet later reveals the truth and apologizes to her sister, the relationship between Yuen and Kok-man deteriorates. Yuen also has a falling out with Sky and breaks up with him due to her insecurities. Kok-man visits his long-time drug addict friend, Fai, only to find him dead. With his drug supply cut off, Kok-man resorts to attempting to steal his family's valuables in front of Kuet to fund his purchase of drugs. Kuet tries to call her sister but is forcefully stopped by Kok-man. However, when Kok-man sees the fear on Kuet's face, he backs down, feels remorse, and breaks down in tears. Yuen returns home but ignores her father. Caught between the two, Kuet asks Yuen to lend her money, which she gives to Kok-man to help him fulfill his addiction. Kok-man leaves a note for Yuen, promising to return the money soon.

In 2017, Kok-man is incarcerated once again, and Kuet visits him in jail. Yuen becomes a tour guide and enters into a friends-with-benefits relationship with a Taiwanese man named Xiao Yu in Japan. While at an izakaya, she is flirted with by a Japanese man, which is discovered by Xiao Yu. Yuen clarifies to Xiao Yu that their relationship is casual and eventually breaks up with him. Upon returning to Hong Kong from her trip, Yuen receives an invitation from Kuet to have dinner with their father. Initially hesitant, Yuen still shows up but remains taciturn during the gathering. Later, when Yuen goes to visit Kuet, she encounters Kok-man near their house. After all these years, the duo finally starts breaking the ice and chatting. Kok-man informs Yuen of his decision to return to Hunan and invites her to visit their homeland during the blooming season of lilies. Soon after, Yuen receives the news of Kok-man's death, prompting her to return to Hunan to visit her relatives on behalf of her father. Finally, Yuen receives a voice recording of Kok-man from Kuet, where he expresses his desire to have another meal with her.

== Cast ==
- Sasha Chuk as Lam Tsz-yuen: a Hunan native who migrated to Hong Kong to reunite with her father and encounters challenges such as poverty, discrimination, and family issues.
  - Chloe Hui and Yoyo Tse portrayed younger versions of Yuen in 1997 and 2007
- Angela Yuen as Lam Tsz-kuet: Yuen's younger sister who also migrated to Hong Kong and works hard to adapt to the city.
  - Skylar Pang and Natalie Hsu portrayed younger versions of Kuet in 1997 and 2007
- Wu Kang-ren as Lam Kok-man: the father of Yuen and Kuet, who smuggled himself into Hong Kong to escape poverty but ends up becoming a drug addict and thief.

Also appearing in the film are Carmen Chou as Yuen and Kuet's mother; Chu Pak Hong as Fai, a drug-addict friend and fellow thief with Kok-man; Wu Chien-ho as Xiao Yu, a friend with benefits of Yuen; and Wong Tsz-ho as Sky, Yuen's first love.

== Production ==
=== Development ===
In 2017, Chinese literature graduate Sasha Chuk published a semi-autobiographical novella Farewell of Summer, based on her personal experience as a mainland native who immigrated to Hong Kong when she was six years old. She began adapting her book into a screenplay while filming the short film Plain Sailing, and was encouraged by producer Jun Li to take on the lead acting role simultaneously. In 2020, Chuk applied for the Hong Kong Film Development Council's First Feature Film Initiative and received funding of HK$5 million. The film then underwent approximately three years of pre-production. Chuk also directed the film, marking her directorial, scriptwriting, and acting debut in a feature. Taiwanese actor Wu Kang-ren was attached to the project in the early stages of casting, on the recommendation of Li to Chuk when Chuk was looking for a non-Cantonese native-speaking actor. Wu accepted the role right after finishing the shooting of Abang Adik (2023) and spent four months residing in Hong Kong to familiarize himself with the traits of Hong Kongers. The film was enlisted at the Asia Film Financing Forum in March 2023, and was selected on the Golden Horse Film Project Promotion in September 2023.

=== Filming ===
Principal photography began in July 2022. Filming was intended to take place in Hong Kong and Tokyo, but due to budget constraints, Chuk was only able to afford a four-member production crew while filming in Japan, and some scenes had to be rewritten to film in Taiwan. Chuk also served as the Hunanese tutor on set. Filming ultimately wrapped in December 2022.

== Release ==
Fly Me to the Moon had its world premiere at the Asian Future section of the 36th Tokyo International Film Festival on 24 October 2023. The film was also selected as the closing film of the 20th Hong Kong Asian Film Festival on 12 November 2023, and was theatrically released in Hong Kong on 11 April 2024. The film was also presented at the 23rd New York Asian Film Festival on 19 July 2024.

== Reception ==
Edmund Lee of the South China Morning Post gave Fly Me to the Moon 4/5 stars and praised Sasha Chuk for "[captivating] her audience with a fragmented yet extremely grounded narrative" and that "it does not feel like an issues movie, even if it touches upon a litany of them – from Hong Kong-China tensions to the prevalence of toxic masculinity", but has reservations that this "serene feature debut may not readily endear her to [Hong Kong]'s mainstream crowd". Lee also ranked the film third out of the 36 Hong Kong films theatrically released in 2024. Wendy Ide of Screen International described the film as an "affecting, unexpectedly hard-edged domestic saga" and an "accomplished first feature from Chuk" which "evocatively taps into the child’s perspective on an unfamiliar world", although noting the music as "one slightly jarring element" that is "overly sentimental" for "this brooding, satisfyingly complex study of the many ways in which the bonds of family can be tested".

Keith Ho, writing for HK01, commended Wu Kang-ren's "award-winning acting" and "a cast of young actors all with bright performances", while the film differed from "ordinary family-themed art films" through its exploration of Electra Complex and Chinese family values through "poverty and self-identity", finding it benefited from Sasha Chuk's own background as a new immigrant and that she has "witnessed the tumultuous yet glamorous era". Siu Wan, reviewing for United Daily News, also described the film as beyond "connotative art film" that it is "more daring than Fruit Chan['s work]", commending Chuk's exploration of identity, social structure, and the experiences of new immigrants in Hong Kong through the characters. Fu Chi-kang, writing for The News Lens, offered a rather negative review and described the film as "poorly directed" and one of the worst in recent years, finding it to have the "worst screenplay for a family soap drama" and that Chuk's filmmaking skills are "clumsy", with "camera angles are poorly handled despite many scenes clearly aim for symbolic and lighting contrast" and "the actors' directions are out of sync with the visuals".

== Awards and nominations ==
Year	Award	Category	Nominee	Result	Ref.
2023	60th Golden Horse Awards	Best New Performer	Yoyo Tse	Won	
2023	60th Golden Horse Awards	Best Adapted Screenplay	Sasha Chuk	Nominated	
2023	60th Golden Horse Awards	Prix FIPRESCI	—N/a	Won	
2023	60th Golden Horse Awards	NETPAC Award	—N/a	Won	
2024	30th Hong Kong Film Critics Society Award	Best Film	—N/a	Nominated	
2024	30th Hong Kong Film Critics Society Award	Best Director	Sasha Chuk	Nominated	
2024	30th Hong Kong Film Critics Society Award	Best Screenplay	Sasha Chuk	Won	
2024	30th Hong Kong Film Critics Society Award	Best Actor	Wu Kang-ren	Won	
2024	30th Hong Kong Film Critics Society Award	Best Actress	Yoyo Tse	Nominated	
2024	30th Hong Kong Film Critics Society Award	Films of Merit	—N/a	Won	
2024	17th Asian Film Awards	Best Newcomer	Yoyo Tse	Nominated	
2024	19th Hong Kong Film Directors' Guild Awards	Best New Actor	Yoyo Tse	Won	
2024	42nd Hong Kong Film Awards	Best Supporting Actor	Wu Kang-ren	Nominated	
2024	42nd Hong Kong Film Awards	Best New Performer	Yoyo Tse	Won	
2024	42nd Hong Kong Film Awards	Best Costume Make Up Design	William Chang, Seven Dos Santos	Nominated	
2024	42nd Hong Kong Film Awards	Best New Director	Sasha Chuk	Nominated	
