= Yoyo Tse =

Hong Kong actress (born 2002)

- 謝咏欣
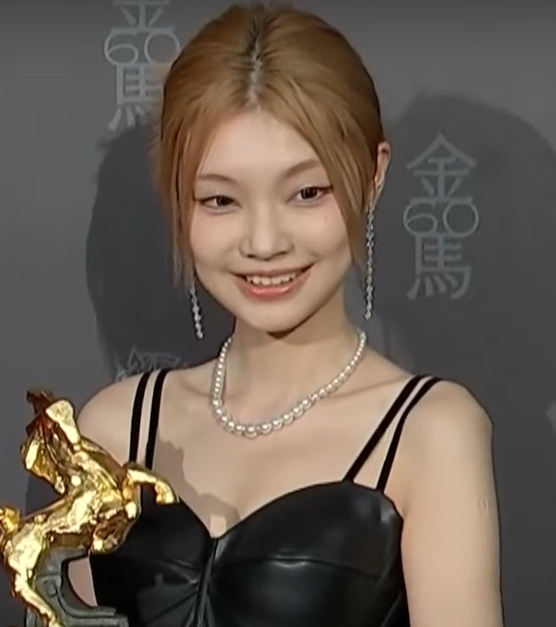
- Tse in November 2023
- Born: Tse Wing-yan; 4 March 2002 (age 24); Hong Kong
- Education: Hong Kong Baptist University (HD)
- Occupation: Actress
- Years active: 2024–present

Yoyo Tse Wing-yan (Chinese: 謝咏欣; born 4 March 2002) is a Hong Kong actress best known for her debut role in the drama film Fly Me to the Moon (2024), which earned her Best New Performer in the 60th Golden Horse Awards and Best New Performer in the 42nd Hong Kong Film Awards.

== Biography ==
Tse was born on 4 March 2002. She had aspirations of becoming a painter or singer from a young age and had never considered pursuing a career as an actress. In 2018, at the age of sixteen, she was approached by director Sasha Chuk while shopping at Argyle Centre and was invited to star as the protagonist in Chuk's short film The Dropout Of Her. Tse later attended the Academy of Film of Hong Kong Baptist University and graduated with a higher diploma in creative film production. In 2020, Chuk invited Tse to audition for her feature film Fly Me to the Moon, and Tse successfully secured the role after multiple rounds of auditions. In the film, Tse portrays Lam Tsz Yuen, a young Hunanese girl who has migrated to Hong Kong, alongside Wu Kang-ren, who plays her drug-addict father. The film marked Tse's feature film debut, and her performance was well received. She won Best New Performer in the 60th Golden Horse Awards and Best New Performer in the 42nd Hong Kong Film Awards, and received a nomination for Best Newcomer in the 17th Asian Film Awards. In an interview with Public Television Service, Tse expressed her desire to continue pursuing acting, and winning the Golden Horse Award further solidified her determination to do so.

== Filmography ==
=== Film ===
Year	Title	Role	Notes/Ref.
2024	Fly Me to the Moon	Lam Tsz Yuen (林子圓)	

== Awards and nominations ==
Year	Award	Category	Work	Result	Ref.
2023	60th Golden Horse Awards	Best New Performer	Fly Me to the Moon	Won	
2024	30th Hong Kong Film Critics Society Award	Best Actress	Fly Me to the Moon	Nominated	
2024	17th Asian Film Awards	Best Newcomer	Fly Me to the Moon	Nominated	
2024	19th Hong Kong Film Directors' Guild Awards	Best New Actor	Fly Me to the Moon	Won	
2024	42nd Hong Kong Film Awards	Best New Performer	Fly Me to the Moon	Won	
