= E Jingwen =

Chinese actress

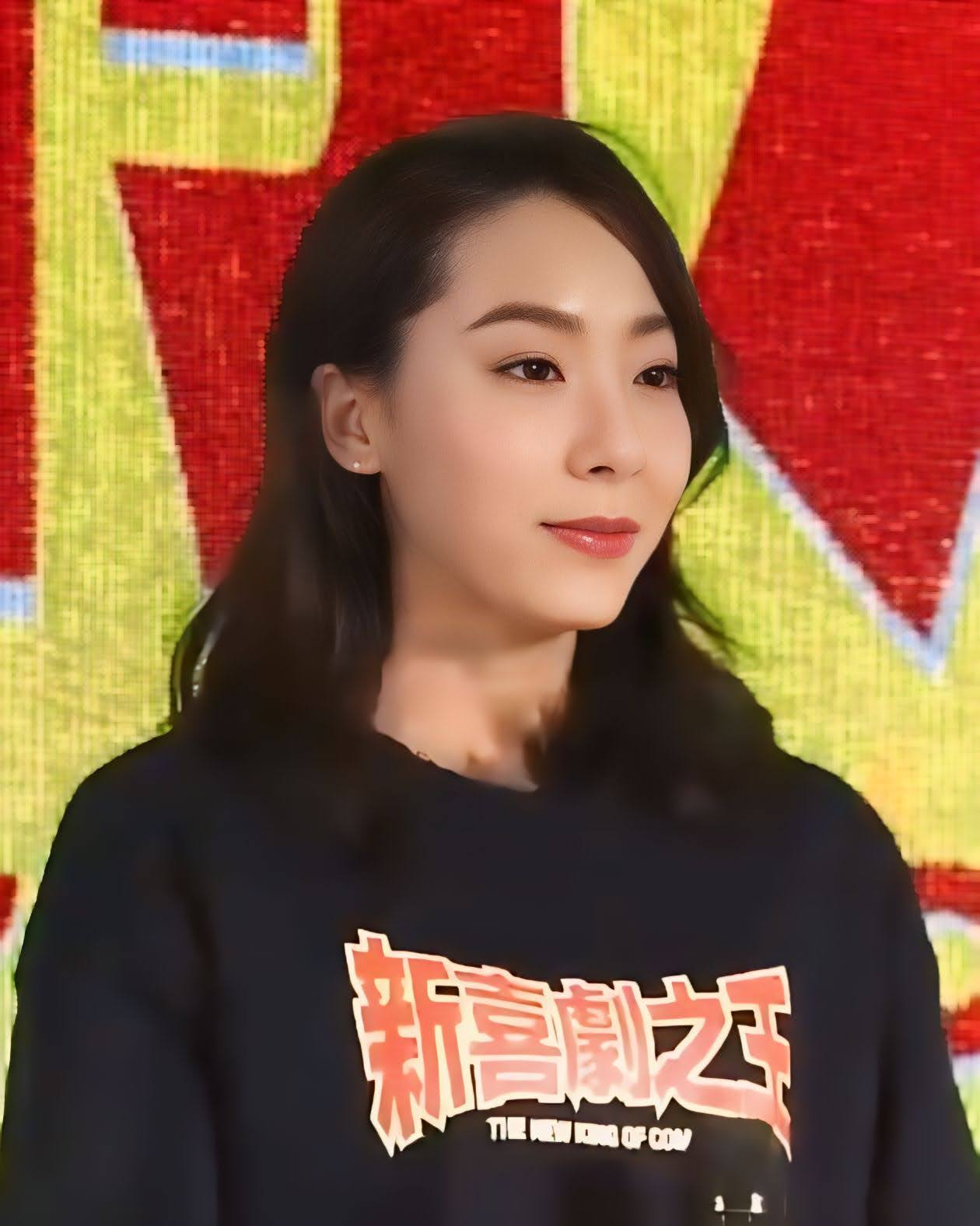
- E Jingwen in January 2019
- Born: February 15, 1989 (age 37); Harbin, Heilongjiang, China
- Other names: Vin E, E Bo
- Education: Central Academy of Drama
- Occupation: Actress
- Years active: 2014—present

Chinese name
- Chinese: 鄂靖文
- Hanyu Pinyin: È Jìngwén

E Jingwen (Chinese: 鄂靖文; born February 15, 1989), also known as Vin E or E Bo (Chinese: 鄂博), is a Chinese actress. E is considered a "Sing girl"—an actress who first received media attention through starring in the movie directed by Stephen Chow, after she has known for her role as "Ru Meng" in The New King of Comedy (2019).

== Early life ==
E graduated from the Central Academy of Drama. E has participated in Hubei Satellite TV 's comedy show, such as comedy madness, Oriental TV 's Swordsman, Laughter Legend, and so on, and have achieved good results. In 2019, she received media attention through starring in the movie which directed by Stephen Chow - The New King of Comedy. On October 11, 2019, she joined China's first director's selection of the reality show "The actor please be in place ."

== Filmography ==
=== Film ===
| Year | English title | Original title | Role | Notes |
|---|---|---|---|---|
| 2016 | Kung Fu Boys | 龙拳小子 | Niu Yueliang | |
| 2017 | Wake Up Master | 醒醒吧之大师 | | |
| 2017 | Wake Up Master 2 | 醒醒吧之跟风者 XX | | |
| 2017 | Wake Up Master 3 | 醒醒吧之跟风者 XXX | | |
| 2017 | City of Rock | 缝纫机乐队 | Journalist | |
| 2018 | Date with an Angel | 马路与天使 | | |
| 2019 | The New King of Comedy | 新喜剧之王 | Ru Meng | directed by Stephen Chow |
| 2026 | Kung Fu Soccer | 幸福魔咒 | Jinglong team soccer player | |

=== TV shows ===
| Year | English title | Original title | Role | Notes |
|---|---|---|---|---|
| 2014 | Comedy Show | 我为喜剧狂 第一季 | Herself | 1st Place |
| 2016 | | 笑傲江湖 第三季 | | |

== Awards and nominations ==
| Year | Award | Category | Nominated work | Result | Notes |
|---|---|---|---|---|---|
| 2019 | 19th Chinese Film Media Awards | Best New Performer | The New King of Comedy | Won | |
| 2019 | 19th Chinese Film Media Awards | Best Actress | The New King of Comedy | Nominated | |
| 2020 | 25th Huading Awards | Best New Performer | The New King of Comedy | Nominated | |
| 2020 | 39th Hong Kong Film Awards | Best New Performer | The New King of Comedy | Nominated | |
