= Bullet in the Head =

1990 Hong Kong film by John Woo

- Directed by: John Woo
- Written by: John Woo; Patrick Leung; Janet Chun
- Produced by: John Woo
- Starring: Tony Leung; Jacky Cheung; Waise Lee; Simon Yam
- Cinematography: Wilson Chan; Horace Wong; Ardy Lam; Somchai Kittikun
- Edited by: John Woo; David Wu
- Music by: James Wong; Romeo Díaz
- Distributed by: Golden Princess Film Production Co. Ltd.
- Release date: 17 August 1990
- Running time: 136 minutes
- Country: Hong Kong
- Languages: Cantonese; English; French; Vietnamese
- Box office: HK$8,545,123

Bullet in the Head (traditional Chinese: 喋血街頭; simplified Chinese: 喋血街头) is a 1990 Hong Kong action film written, produced, edited and directed by John Woo, and starring Tony Leung, Jacky Cheung, Waise Lee and Simon Yam. The film incorporates elements of the action, war, melodrama and crime film genres.

== Plot ==
In 1967 Hong Kong, Ben, Paul, and Frank are childhood friends and members of a gang. They regularly brawl with members of other gangs. Ben becomes engaged to his girlfriend Jane and Frank takes out a loan to pay for the reception. He is attacked by the leader of another gang, Ringo, and they fight over the money. After the wedding Ben and Frank attack Ringo in retaliation and Frank gets carried away and kills him. They meet with Paul and decide to flee Hong Kong to escape the police. They decide to go to Vietnam, as they have heard that there is money to be made as smugglers due to the war.

Ben, Paul, and Frank get a load of contraband goods from a Hong Kong smuggler and agree to take them to a Vietnamese gangster named Leong. The three friends leave and reach Saigon by boat, only to have a Vietcong suicide bomber destroy all of their goods in an attempt on an officer of the Army of the Republic of Vietnam. They are arrested as suspects in the bombing and beaten, until the real bomber is discovered and executed in front of them. They meet Luke, a hitman working for Leong, who dreams of escaping Vietnam with Sally, a nightclub singer Leong has kidnapped and forced into prostitution. The four men attempt to save her, a plan which goes wrong and culminates in a shootout in the nightclub. During the altercation Paul discovers a box of gold in Leong's office and steals it. They escape the nightclub, but Sally is shot in the back and injured.

The next morning, the five of them wait by the river for a boat that is supposed to pick them up. Ben and Frank are concerned with Sally and Paul guards the gold. They are attacked by gangsters and the ARVN as the boat arrives, and Sally dies just as they board it. Luke lets her body drift down the river. As they escape, the boat breaks down, and Paul becomes distressed over losing the gold. The three friends fight over Paul's preoccupation with the gold, and Ben and Frank tell him that the friendship is over. The boat is attacked by gangsters and sinks. Luke, Ben, and Frank escape, but Paul goes back for the gold, almost drowning before Ben and Frank save him and the gold.

Ben, Paul, and Frank are captured by the Vietcong and taken to a prisoner-of-war camp. The Vietcong take the gold, and find intelligence documents in the box that Leong was going to sell to the North Vietnamese. The three friends are brutally interrogated, and Paul claims to work for the CIA to save the others. Frank is forced to kill other prisoners, which distresses him, but Ben asks to join in. When he is told to kill Frank he turns on their captors and they escape, aided by the arrival of a squad of Americans led by Luke. Paul escapes from the Vietcong as well and takes the gold into a field. Frank, who is wounded, follows him and begs for help. They hide from the Vietcong and Paul urges Frank to be quiet, but he continues to scream in pain and fear, and Paul finally shoots him in the back of the head to silence him. Luke rushes to Frank's side, finding him still alive, and loads him into a helicopter.

Ben chases Paul, who finds his way to a peaceful river village and steals a boat, massacring the villagers in the process. Ben witnesses this, and when he tries to save a child Paul shoots them both and escapes. Ben is saved by some monks, and eventually makes his way back to Saigon, where a badly disfigured Luke tells him that Frank is still alive, but that his head injury has changed him; he is now addicted to heroin and works as a contract killer. Luke takes Ben to see him, and after a brief altercation, Ben shoots Frank to put him out of his misery.

Three years later, Ben travels back to Hong Kong and is reunited with Jane, who has given birth to a child. Meanwhile, Paul has become a successful businessman. Ben confronts him over his actions, showing him Frank's skull and blaming him for what happened to him. Paul is indifferent and kicks Ben out. Later, Ben attacks Paul on the street and they engage in a car chase. They find themselves on the pier where they played together as children. They crash their cars, and continue to fight. Paul finds Frank's skull in the wreckage and goes insane, hallucinating that Frank is talking to him. A tearful Ben puts Paul out of his misery, and limps away from the scene.

== Cast ==
- Tony Leung – Ben (Ah Bee)
- Jacky Cheung – Frank (Fai Jai)
- Waise Lee – Paul (Little Wing/Sau Ming)
- Simon Yam – Luke (Ah Lok)
- Fennie Yuen – Jane (Siu Jan)
- Yolinda Yam – Sally Yen (Yan Sau Ching)
- Shek Yin Lau – Fatso
- Chung Lin – Y.S. Leong (Mr. Leung)
- Paw Hee-ching – Ben's Mother
- Soh Hang-suen – Jane's Mother
- Kan-wing Tsang – Jane's Father
- Chang Tseng – Paul's Father
- Kwong Lam Tsui – Frank's Father
- John Woo – Police Inspector

== Production ==
=== Writing ===
Bullet in the Head was originally planned to be a prequel to A Better Tomorrow but a falling out between Woo and producer Tsui Hark prevented this from happening. Woo reworked the script into what it is today, and Tsui made his own prequel, A Better Tomorrow III: Love & Death in Saigon. After the breakup with his partnership with Tsui, Woo was having trouble finding backing for his films; stories have circulated that Tsui (one of the most powerful men in Hong Kong cinema) said Woo was hard to work with, and this led to his virtual blacklisting. At any rate, Woo financed almost all of the cost of the movie out of his own pocket.

Woo rewrote much of the script to incorporate his reaction to the 1989 incident in Tiananmen Square in Beijing. Woo has described this project as his equivalent of Apocalypse Now, as it had the same exhausting and draining effect on him as that film had on Francis Ford Coppola. The cost of the film was around US$3.5 million, the highest budget for a Hong Kong film at the time. Like Woo's previous film, The Killer, this film did not do well in Hong Kong because audiences didn't like the allusions to the Tiananmen Square protests during the riot scenes. Woo was deeply affected by the shootings and felt bad that he touched such a raw nerve in people, but at the same time he felt the Chinese people should react and not hide from it.

=== Filming ===
The Vietnam exteriors were shot in Thailand, and the interiors were shot in Hong Kong at the Cinema City Studio. It was deemed too expensive to shoot the nightclub shootout in Thailand. The helicopter footage used in the camp raid was a mixture of stock footage from the Vietnam War, as well as scenes from another Vietnam film.

During the filming of some of the riot sequences, things got so chaotic on the set that John Woo panicked and ran into several shots. Once, he actually ran into an explosion, which caused large cuts on his head. Simon Yam actually burnt his face during the POW camp sequence.

=== Editing ===
Woo's original cut of the film ran over three hours long. Golden Princess demanded that Woo cut the film down to a commercially viable length, resulting in the original theatrical version being massively edited from Woo's final cut. Consequently, the film exists in many different cuts. The longest version available is the 2 disc-set edition by Joy Sales with a runtime of 135 minutes. A longer 136-minute version was screened at a festival and was released on a bootleg VHS.

== Reception ==
=== Box office ===
In Hong Kong, the film grossed HK$8,545,123 – a disaster when considering its large budget. John Woo is quoted in Jeff Yang's book Once Upon a Time in China as saying that Tsui Hark's A Better Tomorrow III: Love & Death in Saigon was rushed into theatres to beat Bullet in the Head at the box office.

== Critical reception ==
On the review aggregator website Rotten Tomatoes, 90% of 10 critics' reviews are positive, with an average rating of 8.4/10. The film was nominated for 6 awards at the 10th Hong Kong Film Awards, winning Best Film Editing for John Woo. Li Leshi was nominated for Best Art Design at the Golden Horse Film Festival, while Woo was nominated for Best Clip for the film.

In his book The Hong Kong Filmography: 1977–1999, John Charles gave the film a nine out of ten rating, declaring it as John Woo's "most emotionally powerful film" that "comes close to being a masterpiece" The review compared the film to The Deer Hunter, stating that its influence was "obvious" but that one could miss the first half an hour of the aforementioned film and not miss any important information. The review praised Romeo Diaz and James Wong's score as "superb".

In 2014, Time Out polled several film critics, directors, actors and stunt actors to list their top action films. Bullet in the Head was listed at 93rd place on this list.

== Home Media ==
On 5 July 2004, a DVD was released on a two-disc platinum edition by Hong Kong Legends in the United Kingdom in Region 2. One year later, The John Woo Collection DVD was released on 5 September 2005, as a four-disc set including two Chow Yun-fat films: The Killer and Once a Thief. All three films were directed by John Woo.

A director's cut lasting 136 minutes screened at some festivals. It has been illegally released on a bootleg VHS. Another 135-minute version released on DVD has been sold to the public legally. It is distributed by Joy Sales; this disc has seamless branching which can be shown in its Theatrical Version, Alternate Ending version and the Festival Print version but the deleted scenes maintain a blue tint (possibly from the chemicals of the film reacting badly) and also frame jumping (film preservation done too late by the director himself).

On January 6, 2026, the film was released on 4K Blu-Ray restored from the original camera negatives by Shout Studios.

== See also ==
- Jacky Cheung filmography
- Simon Yam filmography
- List of Hong Kong Legends releases
