= Jim Shum =

New Zealand goldminer (1853–1914)

Jim Shum (1853–1914) was a New Zealand goldminer. He was born in Guangdong Province, China in 1853.
