= PTU (film) =

2003 Hong Kong film by Johnnie To

- Film poster
- Directed by: Johnnie To
- Written by: Yau Nai-Hoi; Au Kin-Yee
- Produced by: Johnnie To
- Starring: Simon Yam; Maggie Shiu; Lam Suet; Ruby Wong
- Cinematography: Cheng Siu-Keung
- Edited by: Law Wing-cheung
- Music by: Chung Chi-wing
- Production company: Milkyway Image
- Distributed by: Mei Ah Film Production Co. Ltd.
- Release dates: 17 April 2003; 6 September 2025(4K Restoration)
- Running time: 88 minutes
- Country: Hong Kong
- Language: Cantonese
- Budget: HK$4,000,000

PTU, also known as PTU: Police Tactical Unit, is a 2003 Hong Kong neo-noir action thriller film produced and directed by Johnnie To, starring Simon Yam, Maggie Shiu, Lam Suet and Ruby Wong.

== Plot ==
The film follows a series of encounters of a group of patrolling Police Tactical Unit troopers during one night, which starts off when the patrol-team tries to help a sergeant of the District Anti-Triad Squad of the Hong Kong Police Force, Lo Sa, to retrieve his lost service-issue revolver after he was assaulted by a group of triad members. The films portrays the police officers' use of extra-legal means to achieve the results of investigations and reveals the complex relationships between criminals and police officers, the hostility amongst criminals themselves and even the rivalry among different bureaux within the Hong Kong Police Force.

== Cast ==
- Simon Yam as Police Tactical Unit Sergeant Mike Ho
- Maggie Shiu as Police Tactical Unit Sergeant Kat
- Lam Suet as District Anti-Triad Squad Sergeant Lo Sa
- Ruby Wong as District Crime Squad Inspector Leigh Cheng
- Raymond Wong Ho-yin as Constable Wong
- Eddy Ko as Eye Ball
- Lo Hoi-pang as Bald Head
- Wong Tin-lam as Uncle Fat
- Kenneth Cheung as Orderly

== Production ==
According to To, the budget for the film was approximately HK$4,000,000 or about US$500,000. It was shot entirely at night.

While the final shootout sequence of the film takes place in Canton Road, To reportedly said that "if there was a single location where he would have wanted to stage a gunfight battle, it was Cameron Road, but he could not get permission from the police to do it". The sequence was actually shot in Ap Lei Chau.

== Reception ==
=== Awards and nominations ===
Cognac Festival du Film Policier

- Special Jury Prize (Johnnie To)

Golden Bauhinia Awards

- Won: Best Actor (Simon Yam)
- Won: Best Director (Johnnie To)
- Won: Best Picture (Johnnie To)
- Won: Best Screenplay (Yau Nai-Hoi and Au Kin-Yee)
- Won: Best Supporting Actor (Lam Suet)

Golden Horse Film Festival

- Won: Best Screenplay (Yau Nai-Hoi and Au Kin-Yee)
- Nominated: Best Actor (Simon Yam)
- Nominated: Best Cinematography (Cheng Siu-Keung)
- Nominated: Best Director (Johnnie To)
- Nominated: Best Editing (Law Wing-cheung)
- Nominated: Best Costume Design (Sukie Yip)
- Nominated: Best Original Film Score (Chung Chi Wing)
- Nominated: Best Picture (Johnnie To)
- Nominated: Best Sound Effects (Martin Chappell)
- Nominated: Best Supporting Actor (Lam Suet)
- Nominated: Best Visual Effects (Stephen Ma)

Hong Kong Film Awards

- Won: Best Director
- Nominated: Best Actor (Simon Yam)
- Nominated: Best Cinematography (Cheng Siu-Keung)
- Nominated: Best Film Editing (Law Wing-Cheong)
- Nominated: Best Original Film Score (Chung Chi Wing)
- Nominated: Best Picture (Johnnie To)
- Nominated: Best Screenplay (Yau Nai-Hoi and Au Kin-Yee)
- Nominated: Best Sound Effects (Martin Chappell)
- Nominated: Best Supporting Actress (Maggie Shiu)
- Nominated: Best New Performer (Kenneth Cheung)
- Nominated: Best Visual Effects (Stephen Ma)

Hong Kong Film Critics Society Awards

- Won: HKFSC Award (Johnnie To)
- Won: Film of Merit

Seattle International Film Festival

- Won: Asian Trade Winds Award (Johnnie To)

== Sequels ==
- Tactical Unit: The Code (2008), directed by Wing-cheong Law
- Tactical Unit: No Way Out (2009), directed by Lawrence Ah Mon
- Tactical Unit: Human Nature (2008), directed by Andy Ng
- Tactical Unit: Partners (2009), directed by Lawrence Ah Mon
- Tactical Unit: Comrades in Arms (2009) directed by Wing-cheong Law
