= The New King of Comedy =

2019 Chinese-Hong Kong film by Stephen Chow

- Theatrical release poster
- Traditional Chinese: 新喜劇之王
- Simplified Chinese: 新喜剧之王
- Hanyu Pinyin: Xīn Xǐjù Zhī Wáng
- Directed by: Stephen Chow
- Written by: Stephen Chow; Ivy Kong; Kelvin Lee; Zhao Bojun
- Story by: Stephen Chow
- Based on: King of Comedy by Stephen Chow and Lee Lik-chi
- Produced by: Stephen Chow; Ivy Kong
- Starring: E Jingwen; Wang Baoqiang
- Cinematography: Mazloum Saba
- Edited by: Yeung Kai-wing
- Music by: Raymond Wong; Wendy Zheng
- Production company: Star Overseas
- Distributed by: Lian Rui (Shanghai) Film Industry Co., Ltd.
- Release date: 5 February 2019
- Running time: 91 minutes
- Countries: China; Hong Kong
- Language: Mandarin
- Budget: $8 million
- Box office: $106.6 million

The New King of Comedy (Chinese: 新喜剧之王) is a 2019 comedy-drama film directed, written, and produced by Stephen Chow. A Chinese-Hong Kong co-production, it is a spiritual sequel to Chow's 1999 film King of Comedy, featuring a new setting in China with different characters.

The film tells the story of a young woman who is dreaming and striving to pursue the actors' dream despite being an extra and stand-in. It was released in China on 5 February 2019 during the Lunar New Year 2019. With a budget of US$8 million along with few months of filming and post-production, it is believed to be the smallest project of Chow's career as a filmmaker.

== Plot ==
Ru Meng is an aspiring actress in her thirties whose plain appearance and ordinary figure make it difficult for her to stand out. For more than a decade, she has worked as an extra and stunt double on film sets, dreaming of becoming a leading lady, but her career shows no sign of taking off. Every day she faces rejection and ridicule, and neither her father nor her relatives and friends believe in her dream.

Although her father seems harsh and dismissive of her ambitions, he secretly cares for her and often visits film sets to quietly negotiate better treatment for her. The only person who openly supports her dream is her boyfriend, Charlie, to whom she entrusts the little money she earns to save in a "wedding fund".

One day, while shopping with her close friend Xiao Mi, the two encounter a talent scout. However, only the attractive Xiao Mi catches the scout's attention. Later, Ru Meng lands a small role in the international blockbuster Snow White, starring her childhood idol, Ma Ke, as the prince. Once a major star, Ma Ke has long since fallen from fame. Having lost both his acting ability and the audience's admiration, he is consumed by a mixture of arrogance, insecurity, and frustration, making Ru Meng's experience acting opposite him both humiliating and emotionally exhausting.

Around the same time, Ru Meng discovers that Charlie is actually a male escort (who calls himself a "contract boyfriend") and a serial con artist who has been deceiving her for both her love and her money. Devastated by the betrayal and other setbacks, she nearly dies in a traffic accident during a rainstorm.

Afterward, Ru Meng gives up her dream of becoming a leading actress, returns to live with her parents, and takes a job as a waitress. One day, Ma Ke, whose career has unexpectedly enjoyed a dramatic comeback, visits her to tell her that she has been shortlisted for an audition for a new film directed by Stephen Chow.

With her parents' support, Ru Meng attends the audition. Drawing on the raw emotions from the moment she discovered Charlie's betrayal, she delivers a powerful performance and wins the role.

One year later, at a film awards ceremony, Ru Meng is honored with the Best Actress award.

== Cast ==
- E Jingwen as Ru Meng
- Wang Baoqiang as Ma Ke
- Zhang Quandan as Charlie
- Jing Ruyang as Xiao Mi
- Zhang Qi as Ru Meng's father
- Yuan Xingzhe as Ru Meng's mother

== Production ==
Stephen Chow began writing the film in 2015. Filming began in October 2018 and lasted only a few weeks.

For the movie, Chow cast people who could relate to the life of a struggling actor. He intentionally sought out Wang to play the male lead role, due to the latter's experience in working as an extra early in his career. Actress E Jingwen also worked as an extra prior to The New King of Comedy, similar to the character she played in the film.

Chow recruited the Chinese girl group Ji Feng Shao Nu (Chinese: 疾风少女; lit. 'Storm Girls'), whose members were eliminated in the Chinese version of Produce 101, to sing the film's theme song.

== Release ==
The New King of Comedy was released in China on 5 February 2019.
