= As Tears Go By (film) =

1988 Hong Kong film by Wong Kar-wai

- Film poster

Chinese name
- Traditional Chinese: 旺角卡門
- Simplified Chinese: 旺角卡门
- Literal meaning: Mong Kok Carmen
Transcriptions
Standard Mandarin
- Hanyu Pinyin: Wàngjiǎo Kǎmén
Yue: Cantonese
- Jyutping: Wong6gok3 Kaa1mun4
- Directed by: Wong Kar-wai
- Written by: Jeffrey Lau; Wong Kar-wai
- Produced by: Alan Tang
- Starring: Andy Lau; Maggie Cheung; Jacky Cheung; Alex Man
- Cinematography: Andrew Lau
- Edited by: Cheung Pei-tak; Hai Kit-wai; William Chang (uncredited)
- Music by: Danny Chung; Teddy Robin
- Production company: In-Gear Films
- Distributed by: Kino International
- Release date: 9 June 1988
- Running time: 102 minutes
- Country: Hong Kong
- Language: Cantonese
- Box office: HK$11,532,283 (Hong Kong) $9,436 (United States)

As Tears Go By is a 1988 Hong Kong action crime drama film starring Andy Lau, Maggie Cheung and Jacky Cheung. The film was the directorial debut of Wong Kar-wai, and was inspired by Martin Scorsese's Mean Streets. The central plot revolves around a small-time triad member trying to keep his friend out of trouble. The film was screened at the 1989 Cannes Film Festival, during International Critics' Week.

== Plot ==
Wah is a mob enforcer in Mong Kok who primarily deals with debt collection. His hotheaded and overambitious friend and protégé, Fly, is less successful, often disrespected and frequently causes trouble. One day, Wah receives a call from his aunt, informing him that his younger cousin Ngor, who works at her family's restaurant on Lantau Island, is visiting Mong Kok for a doctor's appointment and will be staying with him briefly.

Soon after Ngor arrives, Wah leaves to help Fly collect a debt. After the job, Wah goes to see his girlfriend, Mabel, who dumps him as he had become increasingly uncaring, and informs him that she had aborted his baby. Wah stumbles home angry and drunk, and when Ngor tries to console him, he becomes aggressive and threatens to throw her out. The next morning, Wah apologizes to Ngor and offers to take her out to a movie to make up for his behaviour.

In order to pay off a loan from a fellow gangster, Tony, Fly makes an unreasonably high bet in a game of snooker. Realising there is no chance he can win, he makes a run for it with his younger brother Site. After being chased through the streets, the two are severely beaten by Tony's gang. As Wah and Ngor are about to leave for the movie, Fly and Site arrive. Wah and Ngor treat their wounds, and Ngor starts to question Wah's line of work. The next day, she returns to Lantau, leaving Wah a note asking him to come to visit someday.

Wah meets with Tony to settle Fly's debt. Unable to pay the interest on the debt, Wah robs the establishment Tony is hired to protect. Insulted by the gambit, Tony takes his grievance to Uncle Kwan, the mob boss, who forces Tony and Wah to reach a compromise. Afterwards, Kwan tells Wah to get Fly under control before he gets himself killed. Conceding that Fly is not cut out for mob work, Wah gets him a job selling fishballs from a food cart.

Wah runs into Mabel and finds out she is now married. He decides to visit Ngor in Lantau, waiting a whole day before meeting her at the ferry pier. Over the next few days, Wah helps out at the restaurant and grows closer to Ngor. Meanwhile, Tony insults Fly at his new job. Fly wrecks Tony's car in retaliation, but Tony's gang promptly catches him and beats him near to death. Wah cuts his visit with Ngor short after receiving a call from Uncle Kwan to make peace with Tony.

Arriving at Tony's place, Wah surprises Tony and holds him at gunpoint, forcing Tony to release Fly. Wah urges Fly to return to his family in the countryside, but Fly refuses. Leaving a bar, they are attacked by Tony and his gang and severely beaten. Fly asks Wah to leave him behind, as he has been a failure and a terrible friend. Wah manages to return to Lantau where Ngor and her doctor treat his wounds. He recovers, and the two rekindle their relationship.

Back in Mong Kok, Fly decides to assassinate a police informant for Uncle Kwan. While waiting for the fateful day, Fly is a "protected" person. He humiliates Tony at a mahjong parlour, prompting Tony's thugs to abandon him in disgust. Hearing the news, Wah tracks Fly down and attempts in vain to talk him out of the hit. At the police station, Fly shoots but fails to kill the informant, and is gunned down by the police. Having witnessed everything from the street, Wah enters the police compound and finishes the job before being gunned down himself. As he lies dying, he remembers his first kiss with Ngor.

== Cast ==
- Andy Lau as Wah
- Maggie Cheung as Ngor
- Jacky Cheung as Fly (烏蠅 Wu Ying)
- William Chang as Ngor's doctor
- Lam Kau as Kung
- Alex Man as Tony
- Ronald Wong as Site

== Release ==
=== Box office ===
During its initial Hong Kong theatrical run, As Tears Go By grossed HK$11,532,283. In Taiwan, it grossed NT$ 4,107,755.00. Until the release of The Grandmaster in January 2013, it was Wong Kar-wai's highest-grossing film in Hong Kong.

=== Home media ===
The film debuted on the Blu-ray format in the United States on January 20, 2009. The disc, released by MegaStar, has since gone out of print.

The film was released on Blu-ray by the Criterion Collection on March 23, 2021 in a collection of 7 Wong Kar-wai films.

== Reception ==
A retrospective review from The New York Times finds that "As Tears Go By heralds a new vision not yet in perfect focus."

On the review aggregator website Rotten Tomatoes, 85% of 13 critics' reviews are positive, with an average rating of 6.8/10. On Metacritic the film has a score of 67% based on 12 reviews indicating “generally favourable reviews.”

== Awards and nominations ==
Awards and nominations
| Ceremony | Category | Recipient | Outcome |
|---|---|---|---|
| 8th Hong Kong Film Awards | Best Film | As Tears Go By | Nominated |
| 8th Hong Kong Film Awards | Best Director | Wong Kar-wai | Nominated |
| 8th Hong Kong Film Awards | Best Actor | Andy Lau | Nominated |
| 8th Hong Kong Film Awards | Best Actress | Maggie Cheung | Nominated |
| 8th Hong Kong Film Awards | Best Supporting Actor | Jacky Cheung | Won |
| 8th Hong Kong Film Awards | Best Supporting Actor | Alex Man | Nominated |
| 8th Hong Kong Film Awards | Best Cinematography | Andrew Lau | Nominated |
| 8th Hong Kong Film Awards | Best Film Editing | Cheung Pei-tak | Nominated |
| 8th Hong Kong Film Awards | Best Art Direction | William Chang | Won |
| 8th Hong Kong Film Awards | Best Original Film Score | Danny Chung | Nominated |
| 25th Golden Horse Awards | Best Director | Wong Kar-wai | Nominated |

== See also ==
- Andy Lau filmography
- Jacky Cheung filmography
- List of Hong Kong films
