= Song of the Exile =

1990 Hong Kong-Taiwanese film by Ann Hui

- Film poster
- Directed by: Ann Hui
- Written by: Wu Nien-jen
- Produced by: Chou Nai-chung; Lin Teng-fei; King Hu; Jimmy Wang Yu
- Starring: Maggie Cheung
- Cinematography: Zhong Zhiwen; David Chung
- Edited by: Wong Yee-shun
- Music by: Chen Yang
- Production company: Cos Group
- Release date: 27 April 1990
- Running time: 100 minutes
- Countries: Hong Kong; Taiwan
- Languages: Cantonese; Japanese; Mandarin; English

Song of the Exile (客途秋恨, translit. Kè tú qiū hèn) is a 1990 film, a semi-fictionalised autobiography directed by Ann Hui. A Hong Kong-Taiwanese co-production, it was screened in the Un Certain Regard section at the 1990 Cannes Film Festival. The film was selected as the Taiwan entry for the Best Foreign Language Film at the 63rd Academy Awards, but was not accepted as a nominee.

== Plot ==
In 1973, 26-year-old Cheung Hueyin is abroad in London studying media. Upon her graduation, she learns that she, unlike her white roommates, has been rejected the chance for a job interview by the BBC. Receiving a letter from her mother, she returns to Hong Kong to attend her younger sister's wedding. The relationship between Hueyin and mother Aiko, who is Japanese, has been strained since childhood, partly a result of Aiko's nationality and the cultural problems she encountered living in Hong Kong. From many flashbacks, we see it was Hueyin's paternal grandparents who did much of the early child-rearing, however, they would often overstep boundaries, resulting in family dysfunction.

Before the end of World War II and before eventually becoming Mrs. Cheung and Hueyin's mother, Aiko spent time living in Manchukuo. There, she and other Japanese faced serious dilemmas after Japan's defeat and the subsequent uncertainties of imprisonment and punishment. The most intense of these dilemmas came with the serious illness of Aiko's infant nephew. His illness was eventually cured by Mr. Cheung after a chance encounter and desperate roadside plea for help by Aiko. Mr. Cheung was an army translator from Guangdong, China with a background in traditional Chinese medicine. Aiko developed a sense of fondness for him upon seeing his actions and character. Aiko's brother concurred, mentioning that kindness toward children usually indicates a man of integrity. After Mr. Cheung escorted Aiko's family to the Japanese repatriation site, he revealed to Aiko a strong desire to be a romantic couple.

In 1973, Hueyin reluctantly agrees to accompany Aiko on a visit to her birthplace in Beppu, Japan. Hueyin initially feels very out of place, not being able to speak the language and having no understanding of Japanese culture. Eventually, though, she bonds with an uncle, learns to accept her Japanese heritage, and finally reaches an understanding with her mother. The experience encourages Hueyin to move beyond the BBC's rejection and become a successful television journalist in Hong Kong. Some time later, Aiko encourages Hueyin to visit her paternal grandparents in Guangdong, where Hueyin finds out one of her very youngest relatives has a mental disability. The film ends with Hueyin praying before a dimly lit, incense-choked ancestral altar, contrasting the open-air shrine she visited in Japan and the outdoor political rallies she now reports on.

== Cast and roles ==
- Maggie Cheung - Cheung Hueyin
- Tan Lang Jachi Tian
- Waise Lee - Mr. Cheung
- Li Zi Xiong
- Lu Hsiao-Fen - Aiko (credited as Xiao Feng Lu)
- Tien Feng - Hueyin's Grandfather (credited as Feng Tian)
- Xiao Xiany
- Yang Tinlan
- Yinjian Quinzi

== Awards ==
- 10th Hong Kong Film Awards (1991)
  - Nominated: Best Film
  - Nominated: Best Director
  - Nominated: Best Screenplay

== See also ==
- List of submissions to the 63rd Academy Awards for Best Foreign Language Film
- List of Taiwanese submissions for the Academy Award for Best Foreign Language Film
