= Red Dust (1990 film) =

1990 Hong Kong-Taiwanese film directed by Yim Ho

- Film poster

Chinese name
- Traditional Chinese: 滾滾紅塵
- Simplified Chinese: 滚滚红尘
Transcriptions
Standard Mandarin
- Hanyu Pinyin: Gǔngǔn hóngchén
- Directed by: Ho Yim
- Written by: Sanmao; Ho Yim
- Produced by: Hsu Feng
- Starring: Brigitte Lin; Chin Han; Maggie Cheung
- Cinematography: Hang Sang Poon
- Edited by: Cheung-Kan Chow
- Music by: Shih Jei-yong; Lo Ta-yu
- Production companies: Tomson Films Co. Pineast Pictures
- Distributed by: Golden Harvest Productions (Hong Kong)
- Release dates: November 23, 1990 (Hong Kong); December 8, 1990 (Taiwan)
- Running time: 94 minutes
- Countries: Hong Kong; Taiwan
- Languages: Cantonese; Mandarin
- Box office: HK$6,656,716

Red Dust is a 1990 drama film directed by Ho Yim. A Hong Kong-Taiwanese co-production, the film follows the life of an independent-minded woman writer during the Japanese occupation who falls in love with a man collaborating with the Japanese.

== Plot ==
During the turbulent 1940s in Japanese-occupied Northeast China, Shen Shao-Hua is punished by her father for falling in love with a classmate. Locked away in the attic and surviving a suicide attempt, she channels her emotions into writing. Following her father's death, Shao-Hua grows into a modestly famous novelist, continuously working on her semi-autobiographical novel.

One day, she receives a letter from an admiring reader, Chang Neng-Tsai, a cultural official working for the Japanese. Despite learning of his background, Shao-Hua falls for him. Although Chang bears no blood debt, he often has to evade assassination attempts by nationalists, whom he secretly assists by helping them relocate. Meanwhile, Shao-Hua's childhood friend Yueh-Feng, distressed after fighting with her revolutionary boyfriend, comes to stay. The three spend a brief period of time together. On a day trip, they witness the brutality of Japanese soldiers against Chinese civilians at a checkpoint. Though Chang's travel papers spare them, his identity is exposed. Yueh-Feng, disgusted, sees him as a traitor. The outing ends in a bitter falling-out.

After Japan's surrender, the Nationalist government begins rounding up traitors. Neng-Tsai flees to a rural village and hides, posing as the partner of a local widow. Shao-Hua eventually finds him, but the sight of him living with another woman to survive devastates her. Heartbroken, she returns to live with Yueh-Feng, only for the past to catch up. Neighbors inform on them, and thugs raid the home. Yueh-Feng protects Shao-Hua and is injured in the process.

Their next-door neighbor, Yu, a quiet businessman who has long harbored unspoken feelings for Shao-Hua, steps in to care for her. Not long after, Yueh-Feng and her boyfriend are killed during an anti-government protest. Shao-Hua survives with Yu's support and later runs into a now impoverished Neng-Tsai. On the eve of the Communist victory, Yu trades his gold for two tickets on the last boat to Taiwan, hoping to flee the mainland with Shao-Hua. Instead, Shao-Hua gives her ticket to Neng-Tsai and watches him sail away. Yu, unwilling to abandon her, gives up his chance to escape and remains by her side.

Shao-Hua lives out her days in quiet obscurity. Forty years later, Neng-Tsai returns to the mainland in search of his lost love, only to find a copy of Shao-Hua's completed novel.

== Cast ==
- Brigitte Lin as Shen Shao-Hua
- Chin Han as Chang Neng-Tsai
- Maggie Cheung as Yueh-Feng
- Josephine Koo as Shao-Hua's editor
- Richard Ng as Yu
- Ho Yim as Yueh-Feng's boyfriend

== Release ==
The film grossed HK$6,656,716 in Hong Kong, and NT$ 14,399,360 in Taiwan.

== Awards ==
- 27th Golden Horse Awards, 1990
  - Best Picture
  - Best Director (Yim Ho)
  - Best Actress (Brigitte Lin)
  - Best Supporting Actress (Maggie Cheung)
  - Best Cinematography (Poon Hang-sang)
  - Best Costume & Make-up Design (Edith Cheung)
  - Best Art Direction (Edith Cheung & Jessinta Liu)
  - Best Original Film Score (Shut Git-Wing)
- 27th Golden Horse Awards nominations, 1990
  - Best Film
  - Best Director (Yim Ho)
  - Best Screenwriter (Sanmao, Yim Ho)
  - Best Supporting Actress (Maggie Cheung)
  - Best Photography (Hang Sang Poon)
  - Best Editing (Cheung-Kan Chow)
  - Best Movie Soundtrack (Shi Jei-yong)
  - Best Movie Song: "Rolling Red Dust" (Sarah Chen, Luo Ta-yu)
