= Spacked Out =

2000 Hong Kong film by Lawrence Ah Mon

- Official poster
- 無人駕駛
- Directed by: Lawrence Ah Mon
- Screenplay by: Yeung Sin Ling; Au Shiu Lin; Law Chi-leung; Lawrence Ah Mon
- Story by: Andy Tse (as Four Tse Liu-Shut)
- Produced by: Johnnie To
- Starring: Debbie Tam Kit Man; Christy Cheung Wing-Yin; Angela Au Man Sze; Maggie Poon MeiKei; Vanessa Chu Man Wah; Lam Hoi-Man
- Cinematography: Lai Yiu-fai
- Edited by: Andy Chan Chi Wai
- Music by: Arion; Keith Leung; Yu Yat-Yiu
- Production company: Milkyway Image
- Distributed by: Mei Ah Entertainment (Hong Kong)
- Release date: 5 April 2000 (Hong Kong)
- Running time: 93 minutes
- Country: Hong Kong
- Language: Cantonese
- Box office: HK$1,358,000

Spacked Out (Chinese: 無人駕駛) is a 2000 Hong Kong social realist film directed by Lawrence Ah Mon and produced by Johnnie To. It has a Category III rating in Hong Kong.

== Plot ==
The story follows four adolescent girls, Cookie, Sissy, Banana and Bean Curd, around Tuen Mun in the New Territories of Hong Kong as the youngest of the group, 13-year-old Cookie, finds out that she may be pregnant, but her boyfriend has left for Mong Kok to sell bootlegged VCDs.

== Cast ==
- Debbie Tam (Kit Man Tam) as Cookie
- Christy Cheung (Wing Yin Cheung) as Sissy
- Angela Au (Man Sze Au) as Banana
- Maggie Poon as Bean Curd
- Chu Man-Wah (Vanesia Chu) as Leung Lai-Yee
- Hoi-man Lam as Mosquito

== Awards ==
The film opened the 2000 Hong Kong International Film Festival for its world premiere. It received a "Films of Merit" award at the 7th Hong Kong Film Critics Society Awards in 2000.
