= Sparrow (2008 film) =

2008 Hong Kong film by Johnnie To

- Promotional poster
- Directed by: Johnnie To
- Written by: Chan Kin-Chung; Fung Chih-chiang; Milkyway Creative Team
- Produced by: Johnnie To
- Starring: Simon Yam; Kelly Lin; Gordon Lam; Law Wing-cheung; Kenneth Cheung
- Cinematography: Cheng Siu-Keung
- Edited by: David Richardson
- Music by: Xavier Jamaux; Fred Avril
- Production companies: Universe Entertainment; Milkyway Image
- Distributed by: Universe Films Distribution Co. Ltd. China Film Group
- Release dates: 11 February 2008 (Berlinale); 19 June 2008 (Hong Kong)
- Running time: 87 minutes
- Country: Hong Kong
- Language: Cantonese
- Budget: $800,000
- Box office: $3.5 million

Sparrow (Chinese: 文雀; pinyin: Wen que; Cantonese Yale: Man^{4} jeuk^{3}) is a 2008 Hong Kong caper film produced and directed by Johnnie To. The film stars veteran Milkyway Image cast and crew alumni Simon Yam, Gordon Lam, Law Wing-cheung and Kenneth Cheung as a small gang of pickpockets, with each member being mysteriously approached by a beautiful Taiwanese woman (Kelly Lin) with a hidden agenda.

Sparrow remained in pre-production for three years from 2005 to 2008, with To shooting the film in between other projects. The film was selected in competition at the 58th Berlin International Film Festival, premiering during the festival in February 2008. It was released in Hong Kong on 19 June 2008.

== Plot ==
In Hong Kong, Kei leads Bo, Sak, and Mac as a team of professional pickpockets who execute coordinated thefts in broad daylight. One day, a sparrow flies into Kei’s apartment; he tells his team about it, but they are unsure whether this is a sign of things to come. Outside of work, Kei enjoys street photography, during which he comes across Chun-Lei, a mysterious woman appearing to be on the run. He becomes fascinated by and photographs her. Unbeknownst to him, Chun-Lei later pays individual visits to Bo, Sak, and Mac, bewitching them all while stealing Bo’s watch, giving her number to Sak, and getting Mac’s number from him.

After parting ways with Mac, she gets into a car with Mr. Fu, a wealthy old man. Fu is ill and, to force Chun-Lei to remain at his side and care for him, locks her passport away in a safe. Managing to excuse herself from Fu, Chun-Lei tracks down Kei and the two go to his apartment. Looking at the photographs of her that he is developing, Chun-Lei burns one, requests that he never reveals them to anyone, and escapes into an apartment in the same building, which she reveals to be hers.

During another photography outing, Kei believes he spots Chun-Lei again and tracks her down to an alley. Seeing Chun-Lei fall and gangsters appear, he tells her to run. However, she turns around, reveals herself to be a male impersonator, and smashes a wooden plank with nails into Kei’s hand. Returning to his team’s usual gathering spot, he is surprised to see that his colleagues are injured as well. Piecing together their stories, they break into Chun-Lei’s apartment. Not only is Chun-Lei not there, but it is bereft of furniture and instead filled with cages of sparrows. The quartet later corner Chun-Lei, chasing her to a rooftop. She reveals that while she is tempted to remain by Fu’s side and continue enjoying a materially wealthy life while caring for him as a sign of gratitude, she yearns to escape him for her true love and begs the gang to help her.

Vowing vengeance against Fu, the gang track down the Traditional Chinese Medicine clinic where Chun-Lei is taking Fu to cupping therapy. While Mac delivers laxative-laced pizzas to the nurses, Bo and Sak pretend to be patients. Shortly after Chun-Lei leaves while the therapy takes place, the nurses rush for the bathroom, allowing Bo and Sak to enter Fu’s room and steal his precious jewelry. Rushing to the rooftop, they attach it to a balloon and float it down to a waiting Mac. However, just as he is about to grab the jewelry, a young man runs into him. Moments later, Mac finds the balloon, but the jewelry is gone. Down the street, Chun-Lei sees the young man carrying the jewelry. Following him, she sees him walk towards Fu’s car and hand it to him, revealing that he had seen through the pickpockets’ ruse.

Some time later, Kei is biking down the street when he sees walls lined with pictures of him and his compatriots and labeled as pickpockets. He immediately calls his brothers, but none of the 3 picks up. Returning to his apartment, he first sees his mailbox stuffed with the same pictures before being cornered by 2 of Fu’s men. They bring him to Fu’s, where Kei sees the other pickpockets captured, along with Chun-Lei. There, Chun-Lei is compelled to claim that though she had problems with Fu, they have been resolved and that she will remain by his side. Fu releases the quartet, but not before stealing Kei’s watch and claiming that Kei’s pickpocketing skills are not up to snuff.

As the gang leaves, Kei suddenly decides to return individually to Fu’s to prove his abilities and make a last bid for Chun-Lei. Stealing a henchman’s tobacco pipe, he then sits down and argues to Fu that since Chun-Lei does not truly love him, he should let her go. Angered, Fu gives Chun-Lei’s passport to Kei and tells him that if he manages to prevent the passport from being stolen until the end of the day, then he can leave with Chun-Lei. If he fails, however, Fu will cut Kei’s hands off and Chun-Lei must remain by his side until he dies. Kei and Chun-Lei agree to the deal.

That night is a rainy one. While Chun-Lei waits alone in Fu’s car, Kei walks along the street. At an intersection, he brushes past 3 of Fu’s men, ultimately using his razor to slit a pants leg on one of them, embarrassing all of them into leaving. At another busy intersection, Kei faces 2 of Fu’s men, so he spins his umbrella to flick water into their eyes, thereby squeezing past them. However, 2 more of Fu’s men follow suit. Using their umbrellas as shields and hands to restrict Kei’s, one of them quickly retrieves Chun-Lei’s passport and tosses it into the hands of a waiting Fu. To his surprise, Kei’s friends are right behind him. Extricating himself from the men’s grasp, Kei walks towards his friends and Fu. Though they manage to steal Chun-Lei’s passport back, Fu surprises them by almost immediately and subtly stealing it back. However, he cuts Kei with his razor in the process, prompting him to comment on how his skills have become rusty.

While Fu walks back to his car, the gang watches helplessly from a distance. Yet, he breaks the deal by personally handing Chun-Lei’s passport to her and freeing her. Leaving in his car, Fu cries hysterically. The next morning, the gang bids Chun-Lei farewell. Riding in the back of a taxi, she excitedly calls her lover. Meanwhile, Kei spots a sparrow in the trees, which he is certain is the one that flew into his apartment. He tries to grab it with his hands but the sparrow poops on his face, prompting teasing from his friends. After horsing around, the quartet ride Kei’s bike as they prepare to begin a new day of thieving.

== Cast ==
Role	Actor
Kei/The Sparrow	Simon Yam
Chung Chun-lei	Kelly Lin
Bo	Gordon Lam
Sak	Law Wing-cheung
Mac	Kenneth Cheung
Fu Kim-tong	Lo Hoi-pang
Lung	Lam Suet

== Production ==
Director Johnnie To shot the film in Hong Kong over a three-year period. In an interview, To said he and his crew would shoot every three or four months between projects.

== Awards and nominations ==
Awards
Award	Category	Name	Outcome
45th Golden Horse Film Awards	Best Original Film Score	Xavier Jamaux, Fred Avril	Nominated
45th Golden Horse Film Awards	Best Cinematography	Cheng Siu-Keung	Won
28th Hong Kong Film Awards	Best Director	Johnnie To	Nominated
28th Hong Kong Film Awards	Best Actor	Simon Yam	Nominated
28th Hong Kong Film Awards	Best Cinematography	Cheng Siu-Keung	Nominated
28th Hong Kong Film Awards	Best Film Editing	David M. Richardson	Nominated
28th Hong Kong Film Awards	Best Original Film Score	Xavier Jamaux, Fred Avril	Nominated
3rd Asian Film Awards	Best Cinematography	Cheng Siu-Keung	Nominated
2008 Asia Pacific Screen Awards	Best Feature Film		Nominated
2008 Asia Pacific Screen Awards	Best Achievement in Directing	Johnnie To	Nominated
2008 Asia Pacific Screen Awards	Best Performance by an Actor	Simon Yam	Nominated
2008 Asia Pacific Screen Awards	Best Achievement in Cinematography	Cheng Siu-Keung	Nominated

Berlin International Film Festival
Year	Award	Result
2008	Golden Bear	In Competition

== See also ==
- Johnnie To filmography
