= Queen of Temple Street =

1990 Hong Kong film by Lawrence Ah Mon

Queen of Temple Street 廟街皇后
- Film poster
- Directed by: Lawrence Ah Mon
- Written by: Chan Man-Keung
- Starring: Sylvia Chang; Ha Ping; Josephine Koo; Kwan Hoi-Shan; Alice Lau
- Cinematography: Chan Ying Git
- Edited by: Kwong Chi-Leung
- Music by: Tats Lau
- Production company: Filmways Production
- Distributed by: Sil-Metropole Organisation
- Release date: 21 April 1990
- Running time: 110 minutes
- Country: Hong Kong
- Language: Cantonese
- Box office: HK$11,828,000

Queen of Temple Street (Chinese: 廟街皇后) is a 1990 Hong Kong film directed by Lawrence Ah Mon. It has a Category III rating in Hong Kong.

== Cast and roles ==
- Sylvia Chang – Big Sis Wah
- Ha Ping – Older Woman
- Josephine Koo – Venus
- Kwan Hoi-Shan – Luke
- Alice Lau – Swallow
- Rain Lau – Yan
- Law Koon-Lan – Streetwalker
- Lo Lieh – Elvis
- Yuen King-Tan – Candy

== Reception ==
The film was described by Paul Fonoroff in 1990 as "the best Cantonese movie to be produced in a long time".

10th Hong Kong Film Awards (1991)

- Best Screenplay: Chan Man Keung – won
- Best Actress: Sylvia Chang – nominated
- Best Supporting Actress: Rain Lau – won
- Best New Performer: Rain Lau – won
- Best Original Film Score: Tats Lau – nominated

== See also ==
- Temple Street, Hong Kong
