= Farewell China =

1990 Hong Kong film by Clara Law

- Traditional Chinese: 愛在別鄉的季節
- Simplified Chinese: 爱在别乡的季节
- Literal meaning: The Season of Love in Another Land
- Hanyu Pinyin: Ài Zài Biéxiāng De Jìjié
- Directed by: Clara Law
- Written by: Clara Law
- Produced by: Teddy Robin
- Starring: Maggie Cheung; Tony Leung Ka-fai
- Release date: 1990
- Country: Hong Kong
- Language: Mandarin

Farewell China is a 1990 Hong Kong drama adventure film written and directed by Clara Law and produced by Teddy Robin. Maggie Cheung and Tony Leung Ka-fai star as Chinese immigrants in New York City.

== Plot ==
In 1988, Li Hong travels from Shawan Village in Panyu, Guangzhou to New York City on a student visa, leaving her infant son in the care of her schoolteacher husband, Zhao Nansheng, and his elderly parents. Li writes back home to complain of homesickness, but Zhao urges her to persevere. A few months later, Li tells Zhao that she will soon be eligible for permanent residence in the United States; she also requests a divorce and ceases further communication with him. A distraught Zhao decides to travel to Panama, from which he is smuggled into New York via Mexico.

Unable to speak much English, Zhao seeks assistance from a local artist friend who had coincidentally met Li (now going by "Elaine") at his gallery. However, Zhao's friend is unwilling to house an illegal alien, leaving Zhao to fend for himself. Out in the street, Zhao spots a prostitute who apparently resembles his wife. He follows her into a brothel, whereupon he is accosted by the woman's pimp. A struggle ensues and Zhao inadvertently shoots the pimp dead; Zhao and the woman he had been following both flee to a nearby club, and Zhao learns that she is in fact a fifteen-year-old runaway from Detroit named Jane.

Jane agrees to help Zhao find Li. Before long, they discover that Li had diligently attended English classes and had also briefly worked at a Taiwanese restaurant in Harlem. The restaurant owners inform Zhao that Li had once been raped at work by two African Americans and that they had last seen Li with a Chinese businessman. Zhao and Jane confront him at his laundry shop; he tells them that he had agreed to a sham marriage with Li, who then absconded with his money.

Zhao begins to pursue an increasingly debauched lifestyle and eventually becomes Jane's pimp. One night, he makes out with Jane but immediately feels repulsed by his own actions. Jane decides to turn her life around by going to school again and the two part ways. Some months later, Zhao bumps into Li while working as a deliveryman. Li brings Zhao into her apartment, while insisting that she had always intended for Zhao and their son to join her in New York. Recalling their life during the Cultural Revolution, Li fears that they are being spied on. The couple embrace and spend the night together.

The next day, however, Li—now speaking in English instead of Cantonese—treats Zhao as though he were a stranger and calls him a "chink". She rushes off to a park in Chinatown, where she attempts to defraud several elderly retirees. Zhao intervenes and urges her to follow him to a psychologist. While trying to escape from him, Li fatally stabs Zhao with a screwdriver, who collapses at the foot of a Statue of Liberty replica while clutching a photograph of the couple with their son. Moments later, Li recognises the people in the blood-stained photograph but is oblivious to Zhao's body.

In a mid-credits scene, back in Guangzhou, Li and Zhao's son still enjoys his life residing with his grandparents, but he will eventually grow up not knowing where his parents are.

== Cast ==
- Maggie Cheung as Li Hong
- Tony Leung Ka-fai as Zhao Nansheng
- Hayley Man Hei-lin as Jane

== Production ==
The film was written and directed by Clara Law and produced by Teddy Robin. Production began on the heels of the 1989 Tiananmen Square protests and massacre, which prompted Law to make the film an "allegory of national suffering". The Statue of Liberty replica in the film's denouement, for instance, evokes the Tiananmen protests' Goddess of Democracy. Law herself described Farewell China as "part naturalistic and part fantasy".

== Release and reception ==
The film was originally released in 1990 under the "innocuous" Chinese title of "Ai zai bie xiang de ji jie" (愛在別鄉的季節) or The Season of Love in Another Land.

The film received several nominations at the 1991 Hong Kong Film Awards, including for Best Film. Sheldon Lu wrote that Farewell China "describes perhaps the lowest point in the self-esteem of the Chinese people, whether they are in China or in the diaspora", while Hong Zeng called the film "a devastating depiction of the schizophrenia of expatriation".
