= Lawrence Ah Mon =

Hong Kong film director (born 1949)

- 劉國昌
- Born: 1949 (age 76–77); Pretoria, Union of South Africa
- Occupation: Director

Chinese name
- Traditional Chinese: 劉國昌
- Simplified Chinese: 刘国昌
Transcriptions
Standard Mandarin
- Hanyu Pinyin: Liú Guóchāng
Yue: Cantonese
- Jyutping: lau4 gwok3 coeng1

Lawrence Ah Mon or Lawrence Lau Kwok Cheong (Chinese: 劉國昌; born 1949 in Pretoria, Union of South Africa) is a Hong Kong film director. His films are notable for their exploration of people on the fringes of society, such as Gangs (1988), Spacked Out (2000), Gimme Gimme (2001) and City Without Baseball (2008). He has also made several films about colonial and postcolonial subaltern history in Hong Kong, such as the Lee Rock series (starring Andy Lau) and Queen of Temple Street (1990).

He has been nominated for Best Director in the Hong Kong Film Awards twice.

== Filmography as director ==
- Gangs (1988)
- Queen of Temple Street (1990)
- Lee Rock (1991)
- Lee Rock II (1991)
- Dreams of Glory: A Boxer's Story (1991)
- Lee Rock III (1992)
- Gangs '92 (1992)
- Arrest the Restless (1992)
- Three Summers (1992)
- Even Mountains Meet (1993)
- One and a Half (1995)
- Spacked Out (2000)
- Gimme Gimme (2001)
- My Name Is Fame (2006)
- City Without Baseball (2008)
- Besieged City (2008)
- Tactical Unit: No Way Out (2008)
- Tactical Unit: Partners (2009)
- Day of Redemption (2013)
- Tales from the Dark 2 (2013)
- Dealer/Healer (2017)
