= Johnnie To filmography =

Filmography

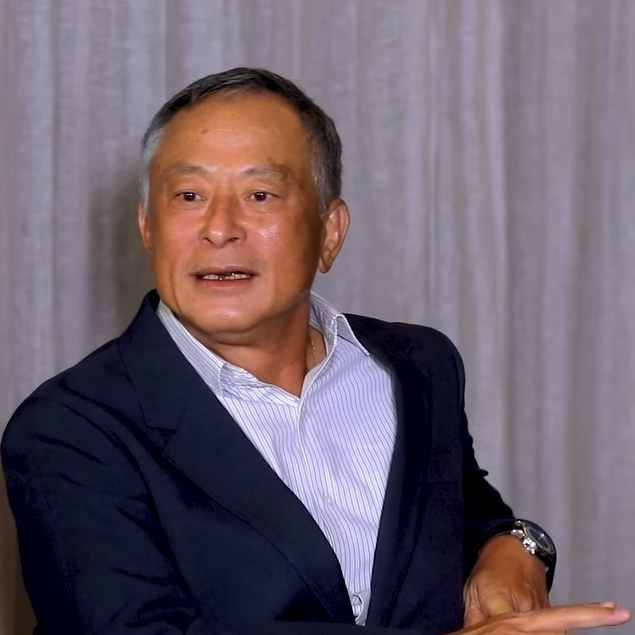
Johnnie To in 2022.

Johnnie To is a Hong Kong filmmaker. He has contributed to many projects, as a producer, director or a combination of the two. He made his directorial debut in 1980, when he directed The Enigmatic Case, a film starring Damian Lau.

In 1996, To began producing and directing films under his independent production company Milkyway Image, a company that he co-founded with frequent collaborator Wai Ka-fai. Commercially successful in his native Hong Kong, To's films have regularly appeared at international film festivals, most notably in Europe and North America.

To's biggest international successes include Breaking News, Election, Election 2 (a.k.a. Triad Election), Exiled, Mad Detective and Drug War; these films have been distributed theatrically in France and the United States and widely sold to foreign countries.

== Filmography ==
This is a list of films which was participated by Johnnie To.

=== Films ===
Year	Film	Credit		Notes
Year	Film	Director	Producer	Notes
1978	The Good, the Bad and the Beauties	No	No	As assistant director
1980	The Enigmatic Case	Yes	No	Feature directorial debut
1985	It's a Drink! It's a Bomb!	No	No	As second unit director
1986	Happy Ghost III	Yes	Executive	—N/a
1986	Royal Warriors	No	No	As second unit director
1987	Seven Years Itch	Yes	No	—N/a
1987	Magneficent Warriors	No	No	As second unit director
1988	It's No Heaven	Yes	No	TVB television film
1988	The Betrayal	Yes	No	TVB television film
1988	The Eighth Happiness	Yes	No	—N/a
1988	The Big Heat	Yes	No	Co-directed with Andrew Kam
1989	The Iron Butterfly	Yes	Yes	Television film
1989	Story of Nam	Yes	Yes	Television film Also as screenwriter
1989	All About Ah-Long	Yes	No	Nominated – Hong Kong Film Award for Best Director
1990	Behind Bars	Yes	Yes	Television film
1990	The Iron Butterfly 2	Yes	Yes	Television film
1990	The Fun, the Luck & the Tycoon	Yes	No	—N/a
1990	A Moment of Romance	No	Yes	—N/a
1990	The Story of My Son	Yes	No	Also as screenwriter
1990	Tomorrow	Yes	Yes	Television film
1991	The Royal Scoundrel	Yes	No	Co-directed with Jonathan Chik
1991	Casino Raiders II	Yes	No	—N/a
1992	Lucky Encounter	Yes	No	—N/a
1992	Justice, My Foot!	Yes	No	—N/a
1993	The Heroic Trio	Yes	No	—N/a
1993	The Bare-Footed Kid	Yes	No	—N/a
1993	A Moment of Romance II	No	Yes	—N/a
1993	The Mad Monk	Yes	No	—N/a
1993	Executioners	Yes	Yes	Co-directed and produced with Tony Ching
1994	Dead End	Yes	Yes	—N/a
1995	Tomorrow	Yes	Yes	Also as screenwriter and story writer
1995	Fatal Assignment	No	Yes	—N/a
1995	Only Fools Fall in Love	No	Yes	—N/a
1995	Loving You...	Yes	No	—N/a
1996	A Moment of Romance III	Yes	Yes	—N/a
1996	Beyond Hypothermia	No	Yes	Hong Kong – Korean co-production
1997	Lifeline	Yes	No	—N/a
1997	Final Justice	No	Yes	—N/a
1997	Too Many Ways to Be No. 1	No	Yes	—N/a
1997	The Odd One Dies	No	Yes	—N/a
1997	Intruder	No	Yes	—N/a
1998	The Longest Nite	Yes	Yes	—N/a
1998	Expect the Unexpected	No	Yes	—N/a
1998	A Hero Never Dies	Yes	Yes	—N/a
1999	Where a Good Man Goes	Yes	Yes	—N/a
1999	Running Out of Time	Yes	Yes	Nominated – Hong Kong Film Award for Best Director; Nominated – Hong Kong Film Award for Best Film
1999	Sealed With a Kiss	No	Yes	—N/a
1999	The Mission	Yes	Yes	Won – Hong Kong Film Award for Best Director; Won – Golden Horse Award for Best Director; Won – Golden Bauhinia Award for Best Director; Won – Golden Bauhinia Award for Best Film; Won – Hong Kong Film Critics Society Award for Best Director; Won – Hong Kong Film Critics Society Award for Best Film; Nominated – Hong Kong Film Award for Best Film; Nominated – Golden Horse Award for Best Feature Film
2000	Spacked Out	No	Yes	Won – Hong Kong Film Critics Society Award for Film of Merit
2000	Needing You...	Yes	Yes	Co-directed and produced with Wai Ka-fai; Nominated – Hong Kong Film Award for Best Director; Nominated – Hong Kong Film Award for Best Film
2000	Help!!!	Yes	Yes	Co-directed and produced with Wai Ka-fai
2000	Comeuppance	No	Yes	—N/a
2001	Wu yen	Yes	Yes	Co-directed and produced with Wai Ka-fai
2001	Gimme Gimme	No	Yes	—N/a
2001	Love on a Diet	Yes	Yes	Co-directed and produced with Wai Ka-fai; Nominated – Hong Kong Film Award for Best Director; Nominated – Hong Kong Film Award for Best Film
2001	Fulltime Killer	Yes	Yes	Co-directed and produced with Wai Ka-fai
2001	Running Out of Time 2	Yes	Yes	Co-directed with Law Wing-cheong
2002	Second Time Around	No	Yes	—N/a
2002	Fat Choi Spirit	Yes	Yes	Co-directed and produced with Wai Ka-fai
2002	My Left Eye Sees Ghosts	Yes	Yes	Co-directed and produced with Wai Ka-fai
2003	Love Under the Sun	No	Yes	—N/a
2003	Love for All Seasons	Yes	Yes	Co-directed and produced with Wai Ka-fai
2003	Looking for Mr. Perfect	No	Yes	—N/a
2003	PTU	Yes	Yes	Won – Golden Bauhinia Award for Best Director; Won – Golden Bauhinia Award for Best Film; Won – Hong Kong Film Award for Best Director; Won – Hong Kong Film Critics Society Award for Film of Merit; Nominated – Golden Horse Award for Best Director; Nominated – Golden Horse Award for Best Feature Film; Nominated – Hong Kong Film Award for Best Film
2003	Turn Left, Turn Right	Yes	Yes	Co-directed and produced with Wai Ka-fai
2003	Running on Karma	Yes	Yes	Co-directed and produced with Wai Ka-fai; Won – Hong Kong Film Award for Best Film; Won – Hong Kong Film Critics Society Award for Film of Merit; Nominated – Hong Kong Film Award for Best Director; Nominated – Golden Bauhinia Award for Best Director; Nominated – Golden Bauhinia Award for Best Film; Nominated – Chinese Film Media Award for Best Director (Hong Kong/Taiwan region); Nominated – Chinese Film Media Award for Best Film (Hong Kong/Taiwan region)
2003	Memory of the Youth	No	Yes	—N/a
2004	Breaking News	Yes	Yes	Won – Golden Horse Award for Best Director; Won – Hong Kong Film Critics Society Award for Film of Merit; Won – Gorilla Award for Best Director; Nominated – Hong Kong Film Award for Best Director; Nominated – Hong Kong Film Award for Best Film; Nominated – Golden Horse Award for Best Feature Film
2004	Throw Down	Yes	Yes	Won – Hong Kong Film Critics Society Award for Film of Merit; Nominated – Hong Kong Film Critics Society Award for Best Director
2004	Yesterday Once More	Yes	Yes	—N/a
2005	Election	Yes	Yes	Won – Hong Kong Film Award for Best Director; Won – Hong Kong Film Award for Best Film; Won – Hong Kong Film Critics Society Award for Best Director; Won – Hong Kong Film Critics Society Award for Best Film; Won – Gorilla Award for Best Director; Nominated – Golden Horse Award for Best Feature Film; Nominated – Golden Horse Award for Best Director
2006	2 Become 1	No	Yes	—N/a
2006	Election 2	Yes	Yes	Won – Hong Kong Film Critics Society Award for Best Film; Nominated – Hong Kong Film Award for Best Director; Nominated – Hong Kong Film Award for Best Film; Nominated – Hong Kong Film Critics Society Award for Best Director; Nominated – Chinese Film Media Award for Best Director (Hong Kong/Taiwan region); Nominated – Chinese Film Media Award for Best Film (Hong Kong/Taiwan region)
2006	Exiled	Yes	Yes	Won – Hong Kong Film Critics Society Award for Film of Merit; Won – Hong Kong Film Critics Society Award for Best Director; Won – Golden Bauhinia Award for Best Director; Won – Golden Bauhinia Award for Best Film; Won – Gorilla Award for Best Director; Nominated – Hong Kong Film Award for Best Director; Nominated – Hong Kong Film Award for Best Film; Nominated – Golden Horse Award for Best Feature Film; Nominated – Golden Horse Award for Best Director; Nominated – Golden Lion
2007	Hooked on You	No	Yes	Won – Hong Kong Film Critics Society Award for Film of Merit
2007	Eye in the Sky	No	Yes	Won – Hong Kong Film Critics Society Award for Film of Merit; Nominated – Hong Kong Film Award for Best Film
2007	Triangle	Yes	Yes	Co-directed and produced with Tsui Hark and Ringo Lam; Won – Hong Kong Film Critics Society Award for Film of Merit
2007	Mad Detective	Yes	Yes	Co-directed and produced with Wai Ka-fai; Nominated – Hong Kong Film Critics Society Award for Best Director; Nominated – Hong Kong Film Critics Society Award for Best Film; Nominated – Hong Kong Film Award for Best Director; Nominated – Hong Kong Film Award for Best Film; Nominated – Golden Lion
2008	Linger	Yes	Yes	—N/a
2008	Sparrow	Yes	Yes	Nominated – Hong Kong Film Award for Best Director; Nominated – Asia Pacific Screen Award for Best Feature Film; Nominated – Asia Pacific Screen Award for Achievement in Directing
2008	Tactical Unit – The Code	No	Yes	—N/a
2008	Tactical Unit – No Way Out	No	Yes	—N/a
2008	Tactical Unit – Human Nature	No	Yes	—N/a
2009	Tactical Unit – Comrades in Arms	No	Yes	Won – Hong Kong Film Critics Society Award for Film of Merit
2009	Tactical Unit – Partners	No	Yes	—N/a
2009	Vengeance	Yes	Yes	Nominated – Palme d'Or
2009	Accident	No	Yes	—N/a
2011	Don't Go Breaking My Heart	Yes	Yes	—N/a
2011	Punished	No	Yes	—N/a
2011	Life Without Principle	Yes	Yes	Won – Golden Horse Award for Best Director; Nominated – Hong Kong Film Award for Best Director; Nominated – Hong Kong Film Award for Best Film; Nominated – Golden Horse Award for Best Feature Film
2012	In Manchurian Dynasty	No	Yes	—N/a
2012	Romancing in Thin Air	Yes	Yes	Won – Hong Kong Film Critics Society Award for Film of Merit
2012	Motorway	No	Yes	Nominated – Hong Kong Film Award for Best Film
2012	Drug War	Yes	Yes	Won – San Diego Film Critics Society Award for Best Foreign Language Film; Won – Hong Kong Film Critics Society Award for Film of Merit; Won – Hong Kong Film Critics Society Award for Best Director; Won – Hong Kong Film Critics Society Award for Best Film; Won – Chinese Film Media Award for Best Director (China region); Won – Chinese Film Media Award for Best Film (China region); Nominated – Asian Film Award for Best Director; Nominated – Hong Kong Film Award for Best Director; Nominated – Golden Horse Award for Best Feature Film; Nominated – Golden Horse Award for Best Director
2013	Blind Detective	Yes	Yes	—N/a
2014	A Complicated Story	No	Executive	—N/a
2014	Don't Go Breaking My Heart 2	Yes	Yes	—N/a
2015	Office	Yes	Yes	Won – Hong Kong Film Critics Society Award for Film of Merit; Nominated – Hong Kong Film Critics Society Award for Best Director; Nominated – Hong Kong Film Critics Society Award for Best Film
2016	Trivisa	No	Yes	Won – Hong Kong Film Critics Society Award for Best Film; Won – Hong Kong Film Award for Best Film; Nominated – Golden Horse Award for Best Feature Film
2016	Three	Yes	Yes	Nominated – Hong Kong Film Award for Best Director; Nominated – Golden Horse Award for Best Director
2019	Chasing Dream	Yes	Yes	—N/a
2020	Septet: The Story of Hong Kong	Yes	Yes	Directed and co-wrote the screenplay for the segment "Bonanza"; Won – Hong Kong Film Critics Society Award for Film of Merit
2023	Mad Fate	No	Yes	Nominated – Hong Kong Film Award for Best Film
TBA	Election 3	Yes	Yes	—N/a

=== Television ===
- No One Is Innocent (1981 TV miniseries) – Director (with Clarence Fok)
- What If (2025) – producer, executive producer

To also served as one of the production services supervisor for the American film Push.
