= Huang Lu =

Chinese actress

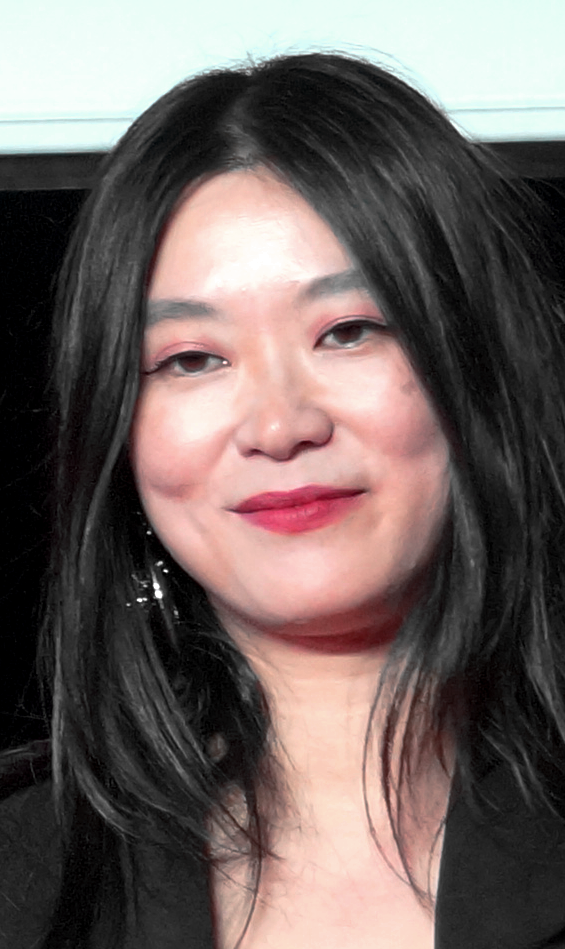
- Born: Huang Lu; July 10, 1983 (age 43); Chengdu, Sichuan, China
- Education: Beijing Film Academy
- Occupations: Actress, producer
- Years active: 2003–present

Huang Lu (simplified Chinese: 黄璐; traditional Chinese: 黃璐; pinyin: Huáng Lù) (born July 10, 1983) is a Chinese actress. A graduate of the Beijing Film Academy, Huang debuted in the film Love for All Seasons (2003) directed by Johnnie To and Wai Ka-fai.

== Filmography ==
=== Film ===
Year	Title	Role	Notes
2003	Love for All Seasons		
2006	The Other Half	Young Sister	
2006	The Road	Xiao Ying	
2006	Before Born		
2007	Blind Mountain	Bai Xuemei	
2007	The Game Sports	Xiao Xiao	
2007	The Red Awn	Xiao Juan	
2008	Seven Intellectuals in Bamboo Forest Part 4		
2008	Seven Intellectuals in Bamboo Forest, Part 5		
2008	start form heart	Luo Yingzhen	
2009	Hu Du	Qin Qianqian	
2009	She, a Chinese	Li Mei	
2009	Distance Runners	Wen Yi	
2009	Between Two Worlds	The Young Chinese Girl	
2010	The Fallible Girl	Chloe	Short film
2011	Yi xiang qing meng	A Yi	
2011	Here, There	Xiao Xia	
2011	Ten Years from Now	Wang Zi	Short film
2012	Vulgaria	Cameo appearance	
2012	Lucky Dog	Bian Xiaocha	
2013	A Fallible Girl	Yaya	
2013	Unpolitical Romance	Chin Lang	also executive producer
2013	How to Describe a Cloud	Li Ling	
2013	Letters from the South	Li Mumu	
2014	Blind Massage	Miss Xiao Man	
2014	3 Pictures	Wen	Short film
2014	Design 7 Love	Emma	
2014	Sway	Vivian	
2014	In Sunshine	Carolyn	Short film
2016	Dog Days	Lu Lu	
2016	A Yellow Bird	Chen Chen	
2016	A Horse with Hope	Teacher Ai	
2017	Zhai	Zhai	
2017	The Conformist		
2017	Forgiven	Li Meihua	
2017	Home Away	Nanny Yun	
2018	Blood 13	Xing Min	
2018	Suburban Birds	Swallow	
2018	Cities of Last Things	Young Yu Fang	
2018	G Affairs	Li Xiaomei	
2019	Suburban Birds	Swallow	
2019	Summer of Changsha	Li Xue	
2019	The Pregnant Ground	Xiao An	Short film
2019	Bloody Daisy	Guo Jing	
2019	Summer Knight	Ms. Chen	
2019	Gone with the Light	He Xiaofen	
2020	Victim(s)	Liu Mei	
2020	Three Oldboys		
2021	Chinese Doctors	Sick woman	
2022	The Fallen Bridge	Zhou Feng	
2022	In Our Prime	Li Yitian	
2023	The Departure	Ye Liya	
2023	Like Wave Like Cloud	Fang Luxi	Short film
2023	The Woman in the Storm	Liu Nan	
2023	Endless Journey	Cheng Bing's wife	
2023	Seven Killings	Liu Xiao Ying	
2024	It's All Here	Li Fang	
2024	Three Old Boys	Hua Jie	
2024	The Caller	Meng Jia's best friend	
2024	The Wig	Huang Fen	
2025	LUZ	Hong	
2026	The Highway	Boss Li	Short film

=== Television ===
Year	Title	Role	Notes
2020	Little Fires Everywhere	Bebe Chow	Recurring role; 6 episodes
2020	Unbending Will	Lan Chu Yun	
2024	Tender Light	Chen Ling	
2024	Ming Ri You Qing Tian	Chang Juan	
2024	Later, I Laughed	He Xiao Li	
2025	Wei Lie	Mai Jia Min	
2026	Wo de shan yu hai	He Xiao Qin	
2026	Hold a Court Now	Shu Jing	
2026	Xuan Aan	Huang Xiao Lan	

=== Producer ===
Year	Title	Notes
2017	A Gentle Night	Short film; also associate producer
