= A Moment of Romance =

1990 Hong Kong film by Benny Chan

- Poster of A Moment of Romance

Chinese name
- Traditional Chinese: 天若有情
- Simplified Chinese: 天若有情
Transcriptions
Standard Mandarin
- Hanyu Pinyin: Tiān Ruò Yǒu Qíng
Yue: Cantonese
- Jyutping: Tin1 Jeok6 Jau5 Cing4
- Directed by: Benny Chan
- Written by: James Yuen
- Produced by: Johnnie To
- Starring: Andy Lau; Jacklyn Wu; Ng Man-tat
- Cinematography: Joe Chan; Horace Wong; Patrick Jim
- Edited by: Wong Ming-kong
- Music by: Lo Tayu; Fabio Carli
- Production companies: Movie Impact; Paka Hill Film Production
- Distributed by: Media Asia Entertainment Group
- Release date: 14 June 1990
- Running time: 91 minutes
- Country: Hong Kong
- Language: Cantonese
- Box office: HK$12,899,353 (2-week) HK$20,000,000 (4-week) Total over HK$32,899,353 (6-week)

A Moment of Romance (Chinese: 天若有情) is a 1990 Hong Kong action romance film directed by Benny Chan, produced by Johnnie To, and starring Andy Lau, Jacklyn Wu and Ng Man-tat. For his performance in the film, Ng was awarded Best Supporting Actor at the 10th Hong Kong Film Awards.

A Moment of Romance tells an action-packed love story between an underworld rag and a rich heiress and is considered a major classic of Hong Kong cinema.

Because of the film, Andy Lau was nicknamed "Wah Dee" (華Dee), the character he portrays in the film, while the film is also one of Lau's signature works.

== Plot ==
Wah Dee, a young triad gangster in Hong Kong, is the getaway driver in a jewelry store robbery. When the raid goes wrong, he takes a young woman named Jo-Jo hostage. A senior member of Wah Dee's gang, Trumpet, demands that she be killed, but Wah Dee resists and saves her. After Wah Dee is arrested, Jo-Jo refuses to identify him to the police. While Wah Dee tries to act coldly towards Jo-Jo, she expresses gratitude and affection towards him, who, on the other hand, also starts to fall in love with her. Wah Dee hides in his grandfather's home in Macau to protect Jo-Jo from the triads, but she finds him and they spend time together there.

After returning to Hong Kong, Jo-Jo is forced to move to Canada with her parents, threatening to prosecute Wah Dee for abducting her. Promising to come with them, she insists on meeting Wah Dee for the last time. A letter expressing her no-regret love for him is left in his apartment after she has taken care of a drunk Wah Dee and his flat as well. Trumpet organizes a meeting to announce his dominance over the gang after the death of their leader. A fight broke out, where brother Seven, Wah Dee's boss, is killed by Trumpet and his partners. Wah Dee escapes with the help of his friend Rambo, yet is hit from behind by Trumpet with a metal gas tank.

Nosebleeded and shocked, Wah Dee then decides to come to Jo-Jo's house and picks her up while she is on the verge of leaving. They arrive at a church to organize their own wedding with outfits stolen from a boutique. While Jo-Jo is praying, Wah Dee secretly leaves. He then follows Trumpet as well as two others out of a sauna with a knife, attempting to kill him. With the help of Rambo, Trumpet and one of his mates is killed yet Wah Dee also dies on the street. Meanwhile, Jo-Jo is seen running on the highway in the wedding dress looking for Wah Dee.

== Cast ==
- Andy Lau as Wah Dee (華Dee), an impulsive, abrasive, but honorable triad member and biker. He grew up as an orphan when his mother threw herself off a building when he was a child and was raised by his mother's three prostitute friends.
- Jacklyn Wu as Jo-Jo Huen, an innocent, pure-hearted rich heiress.
- Ng Man-tat as Rambo (太保), Wah Dee's loyal friend and fellow triad member who works as a car washer.
- Wong Kwong-leung as Trumpet (喇叭), a rival triad in Wah Dee's gang who is power-hungry to be the head of the gang.
- Chu Tit-wo as Brother Seven (七哥), Wah Dee's boss and Trumpet's main rival.
- Lau Kong as Inspector Kong (江Sir), a CID inspector who is bent on prosecuting Wah Dee.
- Lam Chung as Superintendent John Chan (陳Sir), Inspector Kong's superior officer who is an old classmate of Jo Jo's mother, Shirley.
- Sandra Lang as one of Wah Dee's foster mothers who often hums.
- Anna Ng as one of Wah Dee's foster mothers.
- Bonnie Wong as Lin (阿蓮), one of Wah Dee's foster mothers.
- Yuen Bun as Sing (阿成), Brother Seven's underling.
- Leung San as Shirley, Jo Jo's mother.
- Andi Setyawan as Bob, Inspector.
- Ng Wui as Wah Dee's grandfather who lives in Macau.

== Crew ==
- Presenter: Wallace Chung
- Planning: Ringo Lam, Wong Jing, Ise Cheng
- Action Director: Yuen Bun
- Car Stunts: Bruce Law, Joe Chu
- Art Director: Ringo Chueng
- Costume Designer: Lee Yuk-shing, Yam Kam-jan
- Assistant Director: Chu Yat-hung, Law Sai-kuen, Bosco Lam
- Makeup: Wong Lai-kuen
- Hair Stylist: Chan Tat-ming

== Songs ==
=== Theme song ===
- If the World Had Romance (天若有情) (Cantonese) / No Regrets of Youth (青春無悔) (Mandarin)
  - Composer: Lo Tayu
  - Lyricist: Lee Kin-tat (Cantonese), Lo Tayu (Mandarin)
  - Singer: Shirley Yuen (袁鳳瑛)

The theme song was later used as the ending theme for the 1991 television series, The Flying Fox of Snowy Mountains, sung by Fong Fei Fei; And later after Sanmao's death in Jan 1991, Lo added another 4 lines dedicated to her memory.

=== Insert theme ===
- Gray Track (灰色軌跡) (Cantonese) / Dark Space (漆黑的空間) (Mandarin)
  - Composer: Wong Ka Kui
  - Lyricist: Gene Lau
  - Singer: Wong Ka Kui
- Never Regretted (未曾後悔) (Cantonese) / Short Term Gentleness (短暫的溫柔) (Mandarin)
  - Composer: Wong Ka Kui
  - Lyricist: Wong Ka Keung (Cantonese), Gene Lau (Mandarin)
  - Singer: Paul Wong
- Regardless If It's Wrong (是錯也再不分)(Cantonese) / No Need to Understand So Much (不需要太懂) (Mandarin)
  - Composer: Wong Ka Kui
  - Lyricist: Paul Wong (Cantonese), Mike Lau (Mandarin)
  - Singer: Wong Ka Keung

== Awards and nominations ==
Awards and nominations
Ceremony	Category	Recipient	Outcome
10th Hong Kong Film Awards	Best Supporting Actor	Ng Man-tat	Won
10th Hong Kong Film Awards	Best New Performer	Jacklyn Wu	Nominated
10th Hong Kong Film Awards	Best Original Film Score	Lo Tayu, Fabio Carli	Nominated
10th Hong Kong Film Awards	Best Original Film Song	Song: If the World Had Romance (天若有情) Composer: Lo Tayu; Lyricist: Lee Kin-tat; Singer: Shirley Yuen	Nominated

== Sequels ==
A second installment, A Moment of Romance II, was released in 1993 featuring a new storyline but similar themes. Benny Chan and Jacklyn Wu return as director and lead actress respectively, while Andy Lau does not return as the lead actor, with Aaron Kwok leading the film instead. A third and final installment, A Moment of Romance III, was released in 1996 with Johnnie To, producer of the first two films, taking the helm as director and Lau returning as lead actor alongside lead actress Wu.

== See also ==
- Andy Lau filmography
- Johnnie To filmography
- Wong Jing filmography
- List of Hong Kong films
- List of biker films
