= Disciples of Shaolin =

1975 Hong Kong film by Chang Cheh

- Film poster

Chinese name
- Traditional Chinese: 洪拳小子
- Simplified Chinese: 洪拳小子
Transcriptions
Standard Mandarin
- Hanyu Pinyin: Hóng quán xiǎo zǐ
Yue: Cantonese
- Jyutping: Hong2 quan2 xiao3 zi3
- Directed by: Chang Cheh
- Screenplay by: Cheh Chang; Kuang Ni
- Cinematography: Kung Mu-to; Hsu Te-li
- Edited by: Kwok Ting-hung
- Music by: Frankie Chan Fan-kei
- Production company: Chang's Film Co.
- Distributed by: Shaw Brothers
- Release date: 28 June 1975
- Running time: 106 minutes
- Country: Hong Kong
- Language: Mandarin

Disciples of Shaolin (洪拳小子), also known as The Hung Boxing Kid and released internationally as The Invincible One, is a 1975 Mandarin-language Hong Kong martial arts film directed by Chang Cheh. It was remade in 1993 as the Cantonese-language film The Bare-Footed Kid, which was directed by Johnnie To.

== Plot ==
Barefooted martial artist Guan Feng Yi visits his friend Wang Hon, a fellow disciple from Shaolin Temple, at the Xing Fao Long textile mill and begins working there as well. The bosses of the Guilin Tong, a Manchurian Clan, are tempting away workers from Xing Fao Long to work at their competing textile mill. Xing Fao Long Foreman Li Kai refuses, but Foreman Chen Cheng agrees and joins the Guilin Tong, receiving a musical pocket watch as one of his gifts for joining. Guan Feng Yi is promoted to replace Chen Cheng, and requests a new pair of shoes to replace the oversized pair he was borrowing from Wang Hon. Wang Hon is upset that Guan Fen Ying accepted the promotion, because he too was offered such a position in the past and learned that it only means becoming a tool of the bosses to fight their battles.

The Guilin Tong repeatedly attack the Xing Fao Long textile mill, taking its workers by force and even killing Foreman Li Kai. Guan Feng Yi, who has been promoted to replace Chen Cheng, stands up to the Guilin Tong. When Boss He of the Xing Fao Long textile mill is attacked by Lun Ying Tu and his gang of Guilin Tong thugs, Guan Feng Yi saves the boss and breaks Lun Ying Tu's leg, taking the musical pocket watch as a prize. Guan Feng Yi is promoted to head of the textile mill, and Boss He asks Chu Hong to seduce Guan Feng Yi in order to have control over him. She does so, but develops feelings for him as well.

Lun Ying Tu invites Guan Feng Yi to talk, but pulls a blade out of his cane and stabs Guan Feng Yi in the stomach. Guan Feng Yi nevertheless defeats Lun Ying Tu and his men, killing Lun Ying Tu in the end. Guan Feng Yi then confronts Boss Ha He Bu, leader of the Guilin Tong, but his stab wound allows Ha He Bu to kill him. The Guilin Tong dump Guan Feng Yi's body in the hills. Wang Hon, his sister Xiao Ying, and Chu Hong burn Guan Feng Yi's possessions, including the new shoes of which he was so proud.

Wang Hon confronts Boss He but allows him to live, acknowledging that it was Guan Feng Yi's own fault for choosing to become Boss He's tool. Instead, he breaks the porcelain pots in which Boss He keeps his prized fighting crickets. Wang Hon then finds Boss Ha He Bu and kills him.

== Cast ==
- Alexander Fu Sheng as Guan Feng Yi
- Chi Kuan-chun as Wang Hon
- Chen Ming-li as Xiao Ying
- Wang Ching-ping as Chu Hong
- Lu Ti as Boss He
- Chiang Tao as Boss Ha He Bu
- Fung Hak-on as Lun Ying Tu
- Han Chiang as Supervisor Tan Da Bao
- Fan Shou-yi as Foreman Chen Cheng
- Hsu Li as Old Yang
- Stephan Yip as Ah Hong
- Lam Fai-wong as Boss He's Door Guard
- Jamie Luk as Boss He's Door Guard
- Chang Shao-chun as Foreman Li Kai
- Clement Yeh Chao-hsu as Factory worker
- Ko Chang-sheng as Factory worker
- Chin Wan-che as Factory worker
- Hsiao Huang-long as Factory worker
- Chang Yi-kuai as Factory worker
- Tsui Li as Factory worker
- Liu You-pin as Factory worker
- Yeh Fei-yang as Factory worker
- Ma Chin-ku as Factory worker
- Lui Wan-biu as Factory worker
- Wang Ruo-ping as Servant
- Chu Ben-ke as Servant
- Ying Kei as Servant
- Wang Yung-sheng as Thug
- Huang Ha as Thug
- Chan Dik-hak as Thug
- Kwan Hung as Thug
- Brandy Yuen Jan-yeung as Thug
- Wong Shu-tong as Thug
- Chui Fat as Thug
- Chen Shen-lin as Thug
- Law Keung as Thug
- Tang Tak-cheung as Thug
- Ho Bo-sing as Thug
- Chik Ngai-hung as Thug
- Chu Kai as Thug
- Han Ching-hsiang as Servant
- Cheung Chi-ping as Thug
- Chang Chung-yu as Thug
- Chan Siu-kai as Thug
- Ng Yuen-fan as Thug
- Wong Mei as Thug
- Eric Tsang Chi-wai as Thug
- Yu Sung-chao as Thug
- Tung Choi-bo as Thug
- Yuen Shun-yi as Thug

== Production ==
The action choreographer was Lau Kar-leung.

== Reception ==
The film has obtained generally highly positive reviews.

Reviewer Corey Danna of horrorgeeklife.com praised the film, calling it "a great addition to any martial arts collection" and remarking that "of note is the abundance of exciting fight scenes. Each one is distinct, showcasing various styles, but there's something that jumped out at me right away."

Reviewer JJ Hatfield of cityonfire.com gave the film a rating of 9 out of 10, writing, "Lau does a fantastic job with the fights that take place in various locations with different numbers of opponents." The review concludes, "This film was truly ground-breaking territory, not only for Fu Sheng, but for martial arts movies into the future."

Reviewer Andrew Saroch of Far East Films gave the film a rating of 4.5 out of 5 stars, writing that it is better than its remake The Bare-Footed Kid. He writes, "In the truest sense of the often misapplied term 'auteur', Chang Cheh blends recurring themes into everyone of his films. His masterpieces, of which this is one, feature cutting edge choreography and the ideas of brotherhood and morality which signify his work. [...] 'Disciples of Shaolin' is a beautifully crafted masterpiece that requires a global audience."

Reviewer Will of siveremulsion.com gave the film a rating of 3 and a half out of 4 stars, writing, "Disciples of Shaolin is a fantastic piece of work from Chang Cheh, boasting a wonderfully rich script and one of Fu Sheng's best and most affecting performances. An excellent and subtly brilliant addition to the Shaolin Cycle, Disciples of Shaolin is a must-see Shaw Brothers film."

Reviewer Gabe Powers of genregrinder.com wrote that the film has a "narratively bulky first act", but that "once the action picks up, it rarely lags again. Additionally, while the ideals of heroic bloodshed and brotherhood take center stage (especially after the stage is set for the violent rivalry between mills), Disciples of Shaolin's moral outlook is also built around anti-Capitalist sentiment, which isn't unusual [...], but still interesting [...]."

Reviewer Ed Travis of cinapse.co wrote, "Disciples of Shaolin has all the bells and whistles that have long captivated fans of kung fu cinema in general, and Shaw Brothers pictures specifically. So the uninitiated would find much to love here. [...] Disciples of Shaolin is a great example of what the Shaw Brothers studio could do."

Reviewer A.W. Kautzer of The Movie Isle wrote, "There's a cold and calculating heart at the center of this film that cares nothing about your feelings about these characters and what happens to them. [...] That detail and intelligence that's brought to the story are equally brought to the fight scenes. The choreography by Chia-Liang Liu is stylized but there's a sense of wickedness to everyone's movements and attacks. Much of the fun comes from the fighters, both good and bad, fighting as dirty as possible to ensure winning. Not as bloody as many others of the genre but the impact and grace of the choreography is elevated making Disciples of Shaolin something truly special."

Reviewer David J. Moore of The Action Elite wrote, "Thanks to a fun, energetic and lighthearted performance by Fu Sheng (who was a precursor to the style that Jackie Chan would make even more popular), Disciples of Shaolin is a solid martial arts film, though a dour, downbeat ending might sour your opinion of it."

Reviewer Mat Brewster of Cinema Sentries wrote, "Disciples of Shaolin is not the best of the films that I've seen, but it is an interesting film that tries to develop a finer social commentary than most of these sorts of films usually do, while still providing some nicely done fights."

Reviewer Frank Showalter wrote, "Provided viewers can get past the bloated credits and early attempts at semi-slapstick comedy, Disciples of Shaolin should prove rewarding to kung fu fans."

In a positive review of the film, reviewer Joe Corey of insidepulse.com called the film "a top-level Shaw Brothers production."

Reviewer Matt Paprocki of DoBlu gave a more critical review, writing, "Notable in its storytelling, the construction fails. [...] Nothing feels resolved. [...] That, in addition to the strangled pacing, turn Disciples of Shaolin against itself."

== Remake ==
Disciples of Shaolin was remade as the 1993 Mandarin-language film The Bare-Footed Kid, which was directed by Johnnie To.
