= List of awards and nominations received by Johnnie To =

The following is a list of awards and nominations for Johnnie To, a critically acclaimed Hong Kong filmmaker.

== Major associations ==
Hong Kong Film Awards
Year	Film	Result	Category
1990	All About Ah-Long	Nominated	Best Director
1996	Loving You	Nominated	Best Director
1998	Lifeline	Nominated	Best Director
2000	Running Out of Time	Nominated	Best Director
2000	The Mission	Won	Best Director
2001	Needing You... (with Wai Ka-Fai)	Nominated	Best Director
2002	Love on a Diet (with Wai Ka-Fai)	Nominated	Best Director
2004	Running on Karma (with Wai Ka-Fai)	Nominated	Best Director
2004	PTU	Won	Best Director
2005	Breaking News	Nominated	Best Director
2006	Election	Won	Best Director
2007	Election 2	Nominated	Best Director
2007	Exiled	Nominated	Best Director
2008	Mad Detective (with Wai Ka-Fai)	Nominated	Best Director
2009	Sparrow	Nominated	Best Director
2012	Life Without Principle	Nominated	Best Director
2017	Three	Nominated	Best Director

Golden Horse Awards
Year	Film	Result	Category
2000	The Mission	Won	Best Director
2003	PTU	Nominated	Best Director
2004	Breaking News	Won	Best Director
2005	Election	Nominated	Best Director
2006	Exiled	Nominated	Best Director

Golden Bauhinia Awards
Year	Film	Result	Category
2000	Where a Good Man Goes	Nominated	Best Director
2000	Running Out of Time	Nominated	Best Director
2000	The Mission	Won	Best Director
2004	PTU	Won	Best Director
2007	Exiled	Won	Best Director

Hong Kong Film Critics Society Awards
Year	Film	Result	Category
1999	A Hero Never Dies	Won	Best Director
2000	The Mission	Won	Best Director
2004	PTU	Won	Best Director
2006	Election	Won	Best Director
2007	Exiled	Won	Best Director

Asia Pacific Screen Awards
Year	Film	Result	Category
2008	Sparrow	Nominated	Achievement in Directing

Asian Film Awards
Year	Film	Result	Category
2007	Exiled	Nominated	Best Director

== Festival awards ==
Venice Film Festival
Year	Film	Award	Result
2004	Throw Down	Golden Lion	In Competition
2006	Exiled	Golden Lion	In Competition
2007	Mad Detective (with Wai Ka-Fai)	Golden Lion	In Competition
2011	Life Without Principle	Golden Lion	In Competition

Cannes Film Festival
Year	Film	Award	Result
2004	Breaking News	Palme d'Or	Out of Competition
2005	Election	Palme d'Or	In Competition
2006	Election 2	Palme d'Or	Out of Competition
2007	Triangle (with Tsui Hark and Ringo Lam)	Palme d'Or	Out of Competition
2009	Vengeance	Palme d'Or	In Competition

Berlin International Film Festival
Year	Film	Award	Result
2008	Sparrow	Golden Bear	In Competition

Festival du Film Policier de Cognac
Year	Film	Award	Result
2003	PTU	Special Jury Prize	Won; Tied with The Cooler

Changchun Film Festival
Year	Film	Award	Result
2003	Breaking News	Golden Deer	Won

Fant-Asia Film Festival
Year	Film	Award	Result
2000	Running Out of Time	Best Asian Film	Won
2000	The Mission	Best Asian Film	Won

Fantasporto
Year	Film	Award	Result
2008	Triangle (with Tsui Hark and Ringo Lam)	Orient Express Section; Grand Prize	Won
