= Jacklyn Wu =

Taiwanese actress and singer

- Born: 3 July 1968 (age 58); Yuanchang, Yunlin County, Taiwan
- Education: Taipei National University of Arts (BA, Theatre Arts)
- Occupations: Actress; singer
- Years active: 1990–2007
- Spouse: Tsao Sherman Mung (m. 2007)
- Partner: Tuo Tsung-hua (1987–1999)
- Children: 1

Chinese name
- Traditional Chinese: 吳倩蓮
- Simplified Chinese: 吴倩莲
Transcriptions
Standard Mandarin
- Hanyu Pinyin: Wú Qiànlián
Yue: Cantonese
- Jyutping: Ng4 Sin3-lin4
- Musical career
- Also known as: Jacqueline Wu, Ng Sin-lin

Jacklyn Wu Chien-lien (born 3 July 1968) is a Taiwanese actress and singer. She retired after marriage in 2007.

== Career ==
Wu's acting career began as Johnnie To cast her to star opposite Andy Lau in A Moment of Romance (1990). Wu received acclaim for her role in Ang Lee's film Eat Drink Man Woman (1994), in which she plays the second of three sisters. She starred in Ann Hui's Eighteen Springs (1997), for which she received a Hong Kong Film Award Best Actress nomination and won the Hong Kong Film Critics Society Best Actress Award.

Since the turn of the millennium, she shifted her career focus to mainland China. In 2007, Wu married her Tsao Sherman Mung, who worked in pharmaceutical business, in Las Vegas. She has since retired from show business, except a cameo in a Chinese TV series in 2011.

== Discography ==
- Love is Simple (1994)
- Inner Drama (1995)
- Terribly Upset (1995)
- Waiting Because of Love (1995)
- Come Back Home (1996)
- Hope (1997)

== Filmography ==
Film
Year	Title	Role	Notes
1990	A Moment of Romance	Jo Jo Huen	Nominated - Hong Kong Film Award for Best New Performer
1991	The Royal Scoundrel	Yuk	
1991	Casino Raiders II	Lin	
1992	Three Summers		
1993	A Moment of Romance II	Celia	
1993	The Bare-Footed Kid	Lien	
1994	Beginner's Luck	May	
1994	Eat Drink Man Woman	Jia-chien	
1994	The Returning	Elaine / Siu-lau	Nominated - Hong Kong Film Award for Best Actress
1994	God of Gamblers Returns	Siu Yiu-yiu	
1994	Love and the City	Jo Jo	
1994	Treasure Hunt	Mei	
1994	How Deep Is Your Love	Siu-fu	
1994	Oh! My Three Guys	Fok May	
1994	In Between	Icy	
1994	To Live and Die in Tsimshatsui	Ah-bo	
1995	The Adventurers	Crystal Lui 'Chan'	
1995	The Phantom Lover	Yunyan	Changchun Film Festival for Best Actress
1995	Peace Hotel		cameo
1995	Only Fools Fall in Love	Mong Dee	
1995	Mean Street Story	Sue	
1995	Dream Lover	Kitty	
1996	Beyond Hypothermia	Shu Lihan	
1996	A Moment of Romance III	Ting Siu-wo	
1997	Eighteen Springs	Gu Manzhen	Hong Kong Film Critics Society Award for Best Actress; Nominated - Hong Kong Film Award for Best Actress
1997	Walk In	Li Yi-wah	
1997	All's Well, Ends Well 1997	Shenny	
1997	Intruder	Yan	
1997	Dragon Town Story		
1998	Ninth Happiness		
1999	Sorry Baby	Liu Xiaoyun	
2002	Venus		
2004	Jiang Hu	Mrs Hung	

Television
Year	Title	Role	Notes
1997	Beijing-Hong Kong Love Line	Fang Ming	
1998	The Return of the Condor Heroes	Xiaolongnü	
1999	Love the sun, moon and stars	Tsai Jo-lan	
2000	Gold Tax Month	Ellen	
2000	The Essence of Money	Hsiao Chien	
2001	Jigong legend	Ling Hsiao-tsui	
2002	Millennium Love	Hung Wei	
2003	Long Autumn Sky	Fang Lin	
2004	Flower in Dream	Shen I-ting	
2004	The Game of Killing		
2005	The Story of Han Dynasty	Lü Zhi	
2005	Ruan Lingyu	Ruan Lingyu	
2006	Empress Dowager Feng of the Northern Wei Dynasty	Empress Feng	
2006	Beautiful Dream Catcher	Tsui Hsiu	
2006	I Wish I Knew	Yu-lien	
2011	Tang Dynasty Romantic Hero	Yeh Tang-lien	cameo
