= Blind Detective =

2013 Hong Kong-Chinese film by Johnnie To

- Film poster
- Traditional Chinese: 盲探
- Simplified Chinese: 盲探
- Hanyu Pinyin: Máng Tàn
- Jyutping: Mang4 Taam3
- Directed by: Johnnie To
- Screenplay by: Wai Ka-fai; Yau Nai-hoi; Ryker Chan; Yu Xi
- Produced by: Johnnie To; Wai Ka-fai
- Starring: Andy Lau; Sammi Cheng; Guo Tao; Gao Yuanyuan
- Cinematography: Cheng Siu-Keung
- Edited by: David Richardson; Allen Leung
- Music by: Hal Foxton Beckett
- Production companies: Media Asia Film Production; Emperor Film Production; Sil-Metropole Organization; Milkyway Image; Beijing Rosat Film and TV Production; Media Asia Film Distribution (Beijing)
- Distributed by: Media Asia Distributions
- Release dates: 19 May 2013 (Cannes Film Festival); 4 July 2013 (Hong Kong and China)
- Running time: 129 minutes
- Countries: Hong Kong; China
- Language: Cantonese
- Budget: HK$85,000,000 (US$10.9 Million)
- Box office: US$36,417,038

Blind Detective is a 2013 Cantonese-language action crime romantic comedy film directed by Johnnie To and starring Andy Lau and Sammi Cheng.

The film was shown as part of the Shanghai International Film Festival.

== Plot ==
Forced to leave service after turning blind, former detective Johnston Chong See-tun ekes out his living by solving cold cases for police rewards. During a case involving the search for the culprit who throws acid off roofs, he meets an attractive hit team inspector Goldie Ho Ka-tung. When Ho notices Johnston's impressive investigative mind despite lack of vision, she enlists his help in a personal case she is unable to solve on her own. The two work together to solve the case as well as other cold cases.

== Cast ==
- Andy Lau as Johnston Chong See-tun (莊士敦), blind detective, a former inspector of the Regional Crime Unit known as "The God of Cracking Cases"
- Sammi Cheng as Goldie Ho Ka-tung (何家彤), a police inspector
- Guo Tao as Szeto Fat-bo (司徒法寶), chief inspector of the Organised Crime & Triad Bureau (OCTB)
- Gao Yuanyuan as Tingting (丁丁), a dance instructor who is Johnston's dream lover.
- Zi Yi as Joe (祖), Goldie's old neighbor
- Lang Yueting as Minnie Lee (李小敏), Goldie's childhood friend that have gone missing during their teenage years
  - Cheng Ho-lam as Teenage Minnie
- Lam Suet as Lee Tak-shing (李得勝)
- Philip Keung as Chan Kwong (陳廣)
- Chung Wong as Fat Guy (肥漢)
- Lo Hoi-pang as Pang (鵬)
- Bonnie Wong as Minnie's grandmother
- Stephanie Che as Pang's daughter
- Mimi Chu as Pang's wife
- Eileen Yeow as Pang's daughter-in-law
- Li Shing-cheong as Pang's son
- Raymond Tsang as Pang's son-in-law
- Hedi He as Joe's partner
- Yan Ni as Joe's partner's wife

== Production ==
Filming of Blind Detective began in the second half of 2011 in Hong Kong. In June 2012, filming halted after Sammi Cheng was diagnosed with Ménière's disease before resuming filming in August 2012. The film held a worship ceremony on 3 September 2012. The music in the film was provided by Canadian television music composer Hal Foxton Beckett.

== Release ==
The film was selected to play as part of the Midnight selection at the 2013 Cannes Film Festival, while it was theatrically released on 4 July 2013 in Hong Kong and China.

== Reception ==
Derek Elley of Film Business Asia gave the film a score of two out of ten, noting a poor script and describing it as "A rare example of a Johnnie To movie in which nothing seems to work, and even at a basic craft level is below the prolific Hong Kong director's usual standards." Neil Young The Hollywood Reporter also gave the film a negative review, calling it a "punishingly overlong, overcooked confection. Stir in frequent helpings of larkish blind-man slapstick and what results is a misshapen and unsatisfying stew of different genres." Lee Marshall of Screen Daily also gave the film a negative review, stating that "Blind Detective is a decidedly minor offering from the director of The Mission and last year’s impressive mainland-set Drug Wars."

Andrew Chan of the Film Critics Circle of Australia wrote, "As a love story, it works, but the film falls flat on the ground with a padded up detective story that will take more than a gallon of gold to convince."

== Awards and nominations ==
Awards and nominations
Ceremony	Category	Recipient	Outcome
43rd Sitges Film Festival	Best Actor	Andy Lau	Won
50th Golden Horse Film Awards	Best Actress	Sammi Cheng	Nominated
33rd Hong Kong Film Awards	Best Screenplay	Wai Ka-fai, Yau Nai-hoi, Ryker Chan, Yu Xi	Nominated
33rd Hong Kong Film Awards	Best Actress	Sammi Cheng	Nominated
33rd Hong Kong Film Awards	Best Original Film Song	Song: Blind Romance (盲愛) Composer: Hal Foxton Beckett, Marc Baril; Lyricist: Lin Xi; Singer: Andy Lau, Sammi Cheng	Nominated
21st Hong Kong Film Critics Society Awards	Best Actress	Sammi Cheng	Nominated

== See also ==
- Andy Lau filmography
- Johnnie To filmography
- Scene, a 2026 Tamil film with a similar concept
