= Fat Choi Spirit =

2002 Hong Kong film by Johnnie To and Wai Ka-fai

- Film poster

Chinese name
- Traditional Chinese: 嚦咕嚦咕新年財
- Simplified Chinese: 呖咕呖咕新年财
Transcriptions
Standard Mandarin
- Hanyu Pinyin: Lì Gū Lì Gū Xīn Nián Cái
Yue: Cantonese
- Jyutping: Li1 Gu1 Li1 Gu4 San1 Nin4 Coi4
- Directed by: Johnnie To; Wai Ka-fai
- Written by: Wai Ka-fai; Yau Nai-hoi; Au Kin-yee
- Produced by: Johnnie To; Wai Ka-fai
- Starring: Andy Lau; Sean Lau; Louis Koo; Gigi Leung; Cherrie In
- Cinematography: Cheng Siu-Keung; To Hung-mo
- Edited by: Law Wing-cheung; Yau Chi-wai
- Music by: Raymond Wong
- Production companies: Milkyway Image; One Hundred Years of Film
- Distributed by: China Star Entertainment Group
- Release date: 8 February 2002
- Running time: 96 minutes
- Country: Hong Kong
- Language: Cantonese
- Box office: HK$19,218,759

Fat Choi Spirit (traditional Chinese: 嚦咕嚦咕新年財; simplified Chinese: 呖咕呖咕新年财) is a 2002 Hong Kong comedy film produced and directed by Johnnie To and Wai Ka-fai, and starring Andy Lau, Lau Ching-wan, Louis Koo, Gigi Leung and Cherrie In.

The film is a comedy, falling into the peculiar Hong Kong genre of mahjong films, and was released during the Lunar New Year of 2002.

== Plot ==
Andy is an extremely compulsive mahjong player and lost a lot. His house was seized, forcing his mother and younger brother, Louis, onto the streets. As a result, Louis hated Andy and mahjong.

Andy becomes very lucky in playing mahjong, making a livelihood from playing it while Louis, who is academically gifted, formed his own company.

After being beaten up by the debt collectors, Andy meets Gigi who takes care of him. In love with him, Gigi takes care of him, giving him everything he wanted, including asking for blessings from gods. Andy discovered Gigi has character flaws such as bullying others and throwing tantrums whenever she loses. Due to her many obtained blessings, Andy's luck increases and in the process refines his attitude, increasing his luck even more.

Andy however refuses to marry Gigi because even though she is a nice and caring woman but is a sore loser who throws temper tantrums when on the verge of losing mahjong games. Andy says that her true behaviour is revealed from playing a game of mahjong as when she loses, she would throw her temper. Andy gives her a chance on a final game of mahjong where if she wins a mahjong game against him, he will marry her. Despite the other two players conspiring to let Gigi win, Andy ultimately wins the game and Gigi throws a temper saying he does not love her or want to marry her.

In the meantime, Andy finds his mother, who is now suffering from Alzheimer's disease. His brother's company collapsed and their house was seized. They moves in with Andy, who lives in a bungalow. Louis continues to find a job and joins a new company. The company claims to be developing a mahjong software and sends him to seek guidance and tutelage from a mahjong master. Despite having excellent luck in mahjong, Louis has zero skills and was eventually conned out of all his money and his clothes by the supposed mahjong master, Sean. It was revealed that the company is a scam company, sending hapless new employees to be conned out of their money. Cherrie, who is part of the scamming scheme, falls for his innocence and honesty, decides to mend her ways. Andy goes to the conmen and win his brother's money back but is then robbed by them after leaving.

The conman, Sean, finds Andy, seeking to become his student. Andy sets up a mahjong session between his mother, Sean, Gigi and him with the promise that if they win, they get their wishes of Sean becoming his student and Gigi as his wife. In the final game, Andy wins with his opening hand and the session. In anger, Gigi cursed Andy to have bad luck, starting his losing streak and also joins Sean and his conmen. Andy challenges the conmen to get Gigi to leave them but eventually loses. Touched by his attempt, Gigi leaves the conmen.

Andy's house was then seized but the family moved into public housing which they applied for in the past. Andy works as a taxi driver and continues to play, despite his losing streak. Gigi locates them and cleans up their house but make messes elsewhere to clean up the house. Andy takes Gigi to play mahjong and guides her on losing the least despite having poor luck. Enlightened by the session, Gigi decides to improve herself and will come back to Andy once she is ready, giving Andy a blessing before she leaves.

Louis created a mahjong computer game Cherrie, who is now his girlfriend, which is subsequently acquired by a major Japanese company. Launching the game, the company sponsors a mahjong tournament. Andy enters the contest and competes against Sean. Gigi, returned to her old job as a flight attendant, arrives before the tournament and gifts him lucky items from around the world. Andy reveals he has been keeping the last blessing she had given him. Grinding small wins, Andy reaches the final match against Sean, Sean's father and Sean's henchman. With his luck returning, Andy wins the match.

Throwing a tantrum, Sean wants a private rematch which Andy agrees. After Sean makes his first discard, Andy gives up the tournament title and prizes to Sean and walk away with his family. Sean opened Andy's tiles and reveal a major win. Sean's father acknowledges Andy's magnanimity and Sean decides to become his student again.

== Cast ==
- Andy Lau as Andy
- Gigi Leung as Gigi
- Sean Lau as Ching-wan (Sean)
- Louis Koo as Louis
- Cherrie Ying as Cherrie
- Wong Tin-lam as Ching-wan's Father
- Bonnie Wong Man-wai as Andy and Louis's Mother
- Angela Tong as Mahjong Player
- Wong Wah-wo as Mahjong Player
- Lung Tin-sang as Fat Uncle's Man
- Hung Wai-leung as Fat Uncle's Man
- Yuen Ling-to as Fat Uncle's Man
- Four Tse Liu-shut
- Matt Chow

== Release ==
The film had special screening in the NYAFF 25th Anniversary Rediscoveries section of the 25th New York Asian Film Festival on 22 July 2026 as part of the 25th anniversary of the festival.

== See also ==
- Andy Lau filmography
- Johnnie To filmography
- Cinema of Hong Kong
