= The Bare-Footed Kid =

1993 Hong Kong film by Johnnie To

- DVD cover

Chinese name
- Traditional Chinese: 赤腳小子
- Simplified Chinese: 赤脚小子
Transcriptions
Standard Mandarin
- Hanyu Pinyin: Chì Jiǎo Xiǎo Zi
Yue: Cantonese
- Jyutping: Cek3 Geok3 Siu2 Zi2
- Directed by: Johnnie To
- Screenplay by: Yau Nai-hoi
- Story by: Sandy Shaw
- Produced by: Mona Fong
- Starring: Aaron Kwok; Maggie Cheung; Ti Lung; Jacklyn Wu
- Cinematography: Horace Wong
- Edited by: Wong Wing-ming
- Music by: William Wu
- Production company: Cosmopolitan Film
- Distributed by: Newport Entertainment
- Release date: 3 April 1993
- Running time: 86 minutes
- Country: Hong Kong
- Language: Cantonese
- Box office: HK$3,973,198

The Bare-Footed Kid (released in the Philippines as Professional Fighter) is a 1993 Hong Kong martial arts film directed by Johnnie To and starring Aaron Kwok, Maggie Cheung, Ti Lung and Jacklyn Wu. The film is a remake of the 1975 film Disciples of Shaolin, which was directed by Chang Cheh.

== Plot ==
After the death of his father, the poor and illiterate Kwan Fung-yiu (Aaron Kwok) goes out to the provincial capital to seek refuge from Tuen Ching-wan (Ti Lung), a friend of his deceased father, and works in a dye factory, the "Four Seasons Weaver". The political situation in the capital is tense. With his superior identity as a Manchurian, Hak Wo-po (Kenneth Tsang), owner of the "Tin Lung Spinner", dominates the city and set up a gambling den where he sends his workers to fight with workers of "Four Seasons Weave". The newly appointed magistrate Yuen Tin-yau (Cheung Siu-fai) and his instructor Mr. Wah (Paul Chun) want to eradicate Hak, but they do not have enough evidence to bring him to justice. Later, Tin-yau meets Pak Siu-kwan (Maggie Cheung), the owner of "Four Seasons Weaver" and Wah's daughter Lin (Jacklyn Wu). Then it is revealed that Tuen is a fugitive who changed his name and hid in the dye factory to avoid arrest and developed an affection for Pak. Fung-yiu and Lin also develop a mutual bond after an incident.

"Tin Lung Spinners" had always been inferior to "Four Seasons Weaver". Feeling vengeful, Hak sets "Four Seasons Weave" on fire to vent his anger. Fung-yiu, who is witless, dazed and confused, is lured by Hak to the fighting arena, where Hak kills his friend's father. Fung-yiu falls further and further into a quagmire of confusion. He also reveals Tuen's past identity as a killer who is wanted by officials. Yuen Tin-yau's discerning eyes can tell greatness from Fung-yiu, and they work together to defeat the "Dragon Place". However, Tuen is ambushed by Hak, swallows poison, and is shot to death by millions of arrows. Fung-yiu hurries to save Tuen, but it is too late.

== Cast ==
- Aaron Kwok as Kwan Fung-yiu
- Ti Lung as Tuen Ching-wan
- Maggie Cheung as Pak Siu-kwan
- Jacklyn Wu as Wah Wong-lin
- Paul Chun as Mr. Wah
- Kenneth Tsang as Hak Wo-po
- Cheung Siu-fai as Magistrate Yuen Tin-yau
- Wong Yat-fei as Kuei
- Tin Ching as Pak's worker
- Wong San as Pak's indebted worker
- Chu Tit-wo as Hung Chun-tin
- Benny Lai as City guard
- Johnny Cheng as City guard
- Yuen Ling-to as Pui
- Cheng Ka-sang as Hak's bodyguard
- Leung Kai-chi as Weaver at Tin Lung Spinners
- Hau Woon-ling as Sam Ku, woman leading bridal march
- Jacky Cheung Chun-hung as Magistrate Yuen's aide
- So Wai-nam as Magistrate Yuen's aide
- Kent Chow as Magistrate Yuen's aide
- Kong Miu-deng as Hak's thug
- Mak Wai-cheung as Hak's thug
- Huang Kai-sen as Hak's thug
- Chan Min-leung as Chan
- Chan Man-hiu as Shoes vendor
- Ng Wui as Cow owner
- Kam Lau as Shop owner
- San Tak-kan as Boat passenger
- Kai Cheung-lung as Boatman
- Adam Chan
- Kwan Yung
- Jameson Lam

== Music ==
=== Theme song ===
- "The Expression After Speaking" (留下句號的面容)
  - Composer: William Wu
  - Lyricist: Siu Mei
  - Singer: Aaron Kwok

=== Insert theme ===
- "Wait for Your Return" (等你回來)
  - Composer: William Wu
  - Lyricist: Siu Mei
  - Singer: Cass Phang

== Release ==
The Bare-Footed Kid was released in Hong Kong on 3 April 1993. In the Philippines, the film was released as Professional Fighter by South Cinema Films on 21 April 1994, with actor Aaron Kwok credited as "Alexander Fu Sheng Jr."

=== Critical response ===
The Bare-Footed Kid received generally positive reviews. Ard Vijn of Twitch Film writes "it's not a classic by any means but it's a fun movie that definitely has its moments. Fans of either Aaron Kwok, Ti Lung or Maggie Cheung won't be disappointed." Mark Polland of Kung Fu Cinema rated it 4 out of 5 stars and writes The Bare-Footed Kid is a thoughtful kung fu film with an unusually strong story that winningly delivers a message that strength and fighting ability are useless without morality and sound judgment. Andrew Saroch of Far East Films also rated film 4 out of 5 stars and writes "while not as good as Disciples of Shaolin, Bare-Footed Kid is an excellent film and like its inspiration, operates of a number of levels."

=== Box office ===
The film grossed HK$3,973,198 at the Hong Kong box office during its theatrical run from 3 to 14 April 1993.

== See also ==
- Aaron Kwok filmography
- Johnnie To filmography
