= Sundream Motion Pictures =

Sundream Motion Pictures Ltd.
- Type: Subsidiary
- Industry: film
- Founded: 23 March 2005; 21 years ago
- Founder: Tsui Siu-Ming
- Headquarters: Tsuen Wan, Hong Kong
- Key people: William Kwan; Tom Cheung; Stephen Ng
- Products: film
- Parent: i-Cable Communications
- Website: www.sundream-pictures.com

Sundream Motion Pictures Ltd. (Chinese: 驕陽電影), also known as Sundream Pictures, is a Hong Kong production company and distributor. It is a subsidiary of pay TV provider i-Cable Communications Ltd.

== Company ==
The company commenced business as of 23 March 2005.

== Films ==
Sundream Motion Pictures' first feature film was the 2006 film 49 Days, which starred Cantopop idols Stephen Fung and Gillian Chung. Sundream released another film that same year, such as A Battle of Wits starring Andy Lau, and Twins Mission featuring the teen-icon band Twins (Gillian Chung and Charlene Choi).

Yau Nai-Hoi's first directorial effort Eye in the Sky, released in 2007, enjoyed success in Hong Kong, winning several awards at film festivals throughout Asia and North America.

Sundream continues to produce and distribute feature films. Its next films include Howling Arrow which is being directed by martial artist Sammo Hung and Linger a love story directed by Johnnie To and starring Vic Zhou and Li Bingbing.

== Filmography ==
- 49 Days (2006)
- Twins Mission (2006)
- A Battle of Wits (2006)
- Nothing is Impossible (2006)
- Eye in the Sky (2007)
- Howling Arrow (2008)
- Linger (2008)
- Lost‧Indulgence (2008)
- Ticket (2008)
- Champions (2008)
- The Equation of Love and Death (2009)
- Plastic City (2009)
- The Unbelievable (2009)
- S for Sex, S for Secret (2015)
- Guilty (2015)
- Love Detective (2015)
- Daughter (2015)
