= Linger (film) =

2008 Hong Kong film by Johnnie To

- Promotional poster
- Directed by: Johnnie To
- Written by: Ivy Ho
- Produced by: Johnnie To; Tsui Siu-Ming; Cheung Hong-Tat
- Starring: Li Bingbing; Vic Chou; Maggie Shiu; Lam Suet
- Cinematography: Cheng Siu-Keung
- Edited by: David Richardson
- Music by: Guy Zerafa; Dave Klotz
- Production companies: Sil-Metropole Organisation; Milkyway Image
- Distributed by: Sundream Motion Pictures
- Release date: 11 January 2008
- Running time: 88 minutes
- Country: Hong Kong
- Languages: Mandarin; Cantonese

Linger (traditional Chinese: 蝴蝶飛; simplified Chinese: 蝴蝶飞; pinyin: Hu die fei; Cantonese Yale: Woo dip fei) is a 2008 Hong Kong romantic drama film directed by Johnnie To and starring Li Bingbing and Vic Chou.

== Plot ==
Dong (Vic Chou) was dating Fan, but was infatuated with Yan (Li Bing Bing). Dong suddenly dies in a fatal car accident, and Yan is badly affected. She relies on medication to escape from the reality and her true feelings toward Dong. Three years pass, and Yan takes advice from Dr. Yuen (Roy Cheung) to finally relinquish the medication. She starts seeing Dong repeatedly in her dreams and begins to suspect that her encounter with Dong is real. At the same time, she realizes that she is slowly falling in love with Dong. At last, Yan frees her true self to Dong and he fades away gradually as they both defeat the affliction within their hearts.

== Cast ==
- Li Bingbing as Foo Yan-Kai
- Vic Chou as Zeng Jing-Dong
- Maggie Shiu as Miss Chan
- Lam Suet as Yan's Father
- Roy Cheung as Dr. Yuen
- Wong You-Nam as Hui Luk-Wo
- You Yong as Dong's Father

== Production ==
Linger pairs Taiwanese F4 pop star Vic Chou, with Mainland Chinese actress Li Bingbing. The film was shot mostly in Mandarin, to suit the language abilities of the two leads.

== Reception ==
=== Box office ===
Linger was released in Hong Kong on 10 January 2008. On opening weekend, it grossed HK$82,209. At the end of its box office run, it made a total gross of $156,915.

=== Critical reception ===
Linger was met with mostly negative reviews from critics who felt that the film was targeted for younger female audiences and fans of the two leads. Some blamed Ivy Ho's screenplay for being poorly developed.

== See also ==
- Johnnie To filmography
