= Before Born =

2006 film

- Directed by: Zhang Ming
- Written by: Qin Haiyan
- Produced by: Yi Changhuan
- Starring: Liao Zhong; Huang Guangliang; Xu Baihui; Huang Lu; Huang Xiaxi
- Cinematography: Xu Wei
- Edited by: Bao Xiaowei
- Music by: Wen Zi
- Release date: January 5, 2006
- Running time: 104 minutes
- Language: Mandarin

Before Born (simplified Chinese: 结果; traditional Chinese: 結; pinyin: jiégǔo) is a 2006 Chinese film directed by Zhang Ming. Only Zhang's third film in a decade, Before Born is a surreal mystery about modern Chinese life that has garnered comparisons to L'avventura, Michelangelo Antonioni's classic 1960 film. The film tells the story of a private detective, Huang Guangliang, hired to gather evidence of an affair by a man named Li Chonggao. When he arrives in the coastal city of Beihai in search of his target, he discovers that he has disappeared and instead meets an enigmatic young woman who is also looking for Li.

Before Born screened at the 2006 Berlin International Film Festival as part of its Forum program.
