= Intruder (1997 film) =

1997 Hong Kong film by Tsang Kan-cheung

- DVD cover

Chinese name
- Traditional Chinese: 恐怖雞
- Simplified Chinese: 恐怖鸡
Transcriptions
Standard Mandarin
- Hanyu Pinyin: Kǒng Bù Jī
Yue: Cantonese
- Jyutping: Hung2 Bou4 Gai1
- Directed by: Tsang Kan-cheung
- Screenplay by: Tsang Kan-cheung
- Produced by: Johnnie To; Wai Ka-fai
- Starring: Jacklyn Wu; Wayne Lai; Moses Chan
- Cinematography: Cheng Siu-Keung
- Edited by: Wong Wing Ming
- Music by: Cacine Wong
- Production companies: Win's Entertainment; Milkyway Image
- Distributed by: China Star Entertainment Group
- Release date: 29 November 1997
- Running time: 87 minutes
- Country: Hong Kong
- Language: Cantonese
- Box office: HK$446,790

Intruder is a 1997 Hong Kong horror film written and directed by Tsang Kan-cheung and starring Jacklyn Wu, Wayne Lai and Moses Chan. The film was rated Category III by the Hong Kong motion picture rating system.

== Plot ==
On a rainy night in Shenzhen, a female prostitute named Sze-kam Oi-yee was strangled to death by female wanted criminal Yip Siu-ngan in order to assume her identity. Ngan poses as Yee and passes the customs and successfully arrives in Hong Kong. After reporting the loss of her ID card, she successfully obtains Yee's identity. Yee has a Hong Kong ID because her husband is a Hong Kong resident, who at the time was waiting for his wife's arrival.

Siu-ngan meets a brothel frequenter Chan Kai-ming, a taxi driver who is divorced and left his daughter Yin-yin to be cared by his mother, whom he also rarely interferes with. Ngan chooses Ming as her victim and first runs him over with a car, crippling him, and later sneaks into his house and holds him hostage and asks about him in detail. One night, Ming's mother comes to visit her son and the vicious Ngan kills her so she will not ruin her plan, and defrauds Yin.

On the day that Ngan receives her ID card, Yee's husband finds Ngan suspicious and follows her to Ming's house. While he fights with Ngan, her husband, Kwan Fai, arrives and kills him. The couple are both wanted criminals. Fai, who is crippled in both hands, intends to take Ming's identity and his arms. Fai chops off Ming's arms, causing him to die from blood loss, and Fai attaches Ming's arms to himself and successfully obtains Ming's identity.

Just as their plan seems successful, Yin escapes from the two and is found by construction workers. The truth is revealed, and Ngan and Fai are once again wanted by the Hong Kong police. Setting foot on the road to escape again, Ngan quotes to Fai, "blame the moment that I was softhearted, I was not cruel enough before, but it does not matter, I will do better next time."

== Cast ==
- Jacklyn Wu as Yip Siu-ngan
- Wayne Lai as Chan Kai-ming
- Moses Chan as Kwan Fai
- Bonnie Wong as Chan Kai-ming's mother
- Yuen Bun as Sze-kam Oi-yee's husband
- Yuki Lai as Yin-yin
- Lam Suet as Cleaning river entrance
- Hung Wai-leung as Cleaning river entrance
- Choi Kwok-leung
- Wong Man-chun as Policeman

== Box office ==
The film grossed HK$446,790 at the Hong Kong box office during its theatrical run from 29 November to 4 December 1997 in Hong Kong.
