= Casino Raiders II =

1991 Hong Kong film by Johnnie To

- Film poster

Chinese name
- Traditional Chinese: 至尊無上II之永霸天下
- Simplified Chinese: 至尊无上II之永霸天下
Transcriptions
Standard Mandarin
- Hanyu Pinyin: Zhì Zūn Wú Shàng Èr Zhī Yǒng Bà Tiān Xià
Yue: Cantonese
- Jyutping: Zi3 Zyun1 Mou4 Seong6 Zi1 Wing2 Baa3 Tin1 Haa6
- Directed by: Johnnie To
- Screenplay by: Tsang Kan-cheung
- Produced by: Jimmy Heung
- Starring: Andy Lau; Dave Wong; Jacklyn Wu; Monica Chan
- Cinematography: Horace Wong
- Edited by: Ng Kam-wa
- Music by: William Hu
- Production companies: Win's Entertainment; Paka Hill Film Production
- Distributed by: Orange Sky Golden Harvest
- Release date: 13 June 1991
- Running time: 91 minutes
- Country: Hong Kong
- Language: Cantonese
- Box office: HK$16,889,659

Casino Raiders II is a 1991 Hong Kong action drama film directed by Johnnie To and starring Andy Lau, Dave Wong, Jacklyn Wu and Monica Chan. Despite the title, the film is the third installment in the Casino Raiders film series, following Casino Raiders (1989) and No Risk, No Gain (1990). The films in the series are unrelated in plot and merely share the same principal actor Andy Lau.

== Plot ==
Chicken Feet, Kit and James were Uncle Fan's apprentices in the past. When Uncle Fan brought them to Osaka to compete with Taro Yamamoto, James colluded Yamamoto and betrayed Fan, but still lost to Kit. James kills Yamamoto after the latter berates him. Chicken Feet arrives to rescue Fan, who is crippled after leaping off a high platform to escape from James while Kit was beaten by James's henchmen and framed for murdering Yamamoto, leading him imprisoned. Afterwards, James overtook Fan's casino ship so he and Chicken Feet operate small gambling boat. Chicken Feet works hard to prepare for the upcoming Asia Gambling Tournament but his skills are not yet up to par.

James needs a jade tablet belonging to the God of Gamblers to win in the Asia Gambling Tournament harasses Fan, who possesses the jade. Fan tricks Chicken Feet into delivering a briefcase to an old friend in order to steer him from danger and meets with James. When Fan refuses to hand out the jade tablet, James pulls out his gun and Fan's underling, Kei attempts to protect him but was killed by James's top henchman, Pau. Amidst the chaos, Fan throws himself into the ocean and commits suicide. Chicken Feet's girlfriend, Mui realizes the briefcase contains two chunks of wood so they rush back to their boat and finds Fan's dead body.

Kit is released from prison and finds out Fan's death from the newspaper on his flight back to Hong Kong. Kit arrives at Fan's funeral informing Chicken Feet he intends to quit gambling for good. Kit's girlfriend also arrives to inform him that Fan sent her a telegraph with something to hand him. As Kit leaves the funeral home, he is approached by Mr. Yeung, who is betting on James to win the Asia Gambling Tournament, and offers Kit US$10 million to lose on purpose, but he assures Yeung he will not be participating. Kit then picks up his daughter, Yan-yan, from his cousin, who is traumatized by the abuse from his cousin's wife, but Kit manages to heal his daughter from the trauma as he cares for her.

Kit later works as a cocktail bartender at his friend, King Kong's bar but James orders Pau to trash the bar and beat up King Kong as well as kidnapping Yan-yan. Chicken Feet barges into James's office and beats up his henchmen in an attempt to rescue Yan-yan. James challenges Chicken Feet to a blackjack match and would allow him to leave with Yan-yan if he wins but he must strip down to his underwear if he loses. Chicken Feet loses and Kit arrives, so James demands Kit to cut off his own hand if he wants his daughter back to which Kit complies.

Later, Chicken Feet, Kit and Mui close their gambling boat and open a fast food restaurant but Chicken Feet is not contempt and becomes agitated when he encounters entitled customers, which upsets Mui. Mui confides with Kit's girlfriend to find the item Fan sent her through telegraphs in order to help Chicken Feet. Chicken Feet notices James's henchmen tailing Mui and Kit's girlfriend so he follows them as well, where they arrive at a cemetery and discovers 873154 is the number of a tombstone where Fan hid the jade tablet along with a letter inside a case. Chicken Feet tells Mui and Kit's girlfriend to leave with the jade tablet while he takes the case and part ways in order to fool James. However, Mui tells Kit's girlfriend to leave with the jade as she wants to help Chicken Feet. When Chicken Feet is stopped by Pau and his henchmen, Mui arrives with Kit's girlfriend's car and runs over Pau, killing him while Chicken Feet snatched one of the henchmen's gun and kills several of the henchmen before Mui crashes into the water, injuring her leg. As James and more henchmen arrives, Mui knocks Chicken Feet unconscious with a boat paddle when he turns around and puts him on a boat to sail away. However, Mui is captured and tortured by James. Chicken Feet wakes up and sees this so he crashes into James's henchman. While Chicken Feet fights off the henchmen, James hits his eyes with fluorescent lamp, which blinds him, while Mui dies from her injuries.

Kit reads a letter Fan wrote to him stating he has left US$20 million for him to participate in the Asia Gambling Tournament to seek revenge and use the jade tablet if necessary, but Kit throws it into the water. Chicken Feet and Kit both enter the Asia Gambling Tournament and end up in the finals along with James and a fourth competitor. Kit feigns his previous agreement with Yeung and loses, leaving Chicken Feet and James in the final battle. Chicken Feet hand has an A spades, 3 spades, 4 spades, 5 spades and a 2 spades covered, while James has a J clubs, J diamonds, Q diamond, Q hearts and a Q spades covered. Chicken Feet calls show hand, as well as putting the jade tablet and his own life at stake to bet with James's life. Feeling intimidated, James quits the round and Chicken Feet wins the tournament before revealing to James he used a fake jade to fool him. Kit then feigns reconciling with James in front of Yeung while Yeung's rival, Mr. Chung, reveals to him that James bet US$5 million for himself to lose and Yeung's henchmen kill James as he exits the tournament. Chicken Feet temporary leaves Hong Kong to avoid danger from those who lost money from his win and right after sending him off, Kit was shot by Yeung's assassins.

== Cast ==
- Andy Lau as Chicken Feet (雞翼), a skilled gambler who has not quite reached an advanced level of expertise. He is hot-headed and determined, putting effort to improve his gambling skills to compete in the Asia Gambling Tournament as well as avenging his mentor, Uncle Fan.
- Dave Wong as Sau Kit (仇傑), dubbed the Fastest Hand of Asia (亞洲第一快手), Uncle Fan's disciple who is an expert gambler. After being framed by James, who is jealous of his superior gambling skills, for the murder of Toro Yamoto, he was imprisoned in Osaka and gives up gambling after his release.
- Jacklyn Wu as Mui (妹釘), Chicken Feet's girlfriend who has a sassy attitude, but willing to make any sacrifices for her boyfriend. She is pregnant with Chicken Feet's child but is afraid to tell him due to his frustration being unable to avenge Uncle Fan.
- Monica Chan as Kit's ex-girlfriend who broke up with him in the past when he chose gambling over her, but they reconcile after his release from prison and she helps him take care of his daughter Yan-yan.
- Kelvin Wong as James (詹永飛), Uncle Fan's former disciple who betrays him due to greed and drives him to suicide after attempting to force him to hand out the God of Gamblers's jade tablet.
- Anthony Wong as Pau (阿炮), James's top henchman who is violent and cruel.
- Chan Cheuk-yan as Yan-yan (欣欣), Kit's daughter from his ex-wife who was taken care by Kit's cousin while he was in prison and was abused by his cousin's wife.
- Lau Siu-ming as Uncle Fan (范叔 ), Chicken Feet, Kit and James's mentor who possess the God of Gamblers's jade tablet.
- Lee Siu-kei as Kei (阿基), Fan's loyal underling.
- Peter Yang as Mr. Yeung (老楊), a casino owner who bets on James to win the Asia Gambling Tournament while paying Kit to lose.
- Tien Feng as Mr. Chung, Mr. Yeung's rival who bets on Chicken Feet and Kit winning the Asia Gambling Tournament.
- Wong San as the judge of the Asia Gambling Tournament.
- Lau Kong as King Kong, Kit's old friend who is a bar owner and hires Kit as a cocktail bartender after his release from prison.
- Lam Chung as the funeral director at Uncle Fan's funeral. (cameo)
- Lau Shun as Toro Yamamoto (山本太郎), a Japanese gambler who colludes with James. (cameo)
- Wong Yat-fei as Kit's older cousin who took care of Yan-yan while Kit was in prison. (cameo)
- Anna Ng as the wife Kit's cousin who abused Yan-yan when Kit was in prison. (cameo)
- Wong Wai-kei as Kit's ex-wife and Yan-yan's mother who is now married to Pay.
- Au-yeung Yiu-yam as a poker cheat on Fan's casino boat who was exposed by Chicken Feet.
- Shing Wan-on as Mr. Shing (成先生).
- Lui Siu-ming as Shing's underling.
- Choi Kwok-kuen as Pau's henchman.
- James Ha as Pau's henchman.
- Chang Sing-kwong as Pau's henchman.
- Lau Shung Fung as Pau's henchman.
- Fung Man-kwong as Yeung's bodyguard.
- Hui Sze-man as a mahjong friend of cousin's wife
- Jameson Lam as James's henchman.
- Fan Chin-hung as James's henchman.
- Lam Foo-wai as James's henchman.
- Chan Sek as James's henchman.
- Tang Cheung as the funeral MC at Fan's funeral.
- Ma Yuk-sing as Yeung's assassin with a newspaper.
- Ho Chi-moon as gambling competition spectator in Oksaka.

== Music ==
=== Theme song ===
- The Days We Went Through Together (一起走過的日子) (Cantonese) / The Fate of Next Life (來生緣) (Mandarin)
  - Composer: William Hu
  - Lyricist: Siu Mei
  - Singer: Andy Lau

=== Insert themes ===
- The Dream that Never Dies (不死的夢)
  - Composer: William Hu
  - Lyricist: Siu Mei
  - Singer: Andy Lau
- Heartache (心痛)
  - Composer: Dave Wong
  - Lyricist: Dave Wong
  - Singer: Dave Wong

=== Ending theme ===
- Cold Long Street (冰冷長街) (Cantonese) / Forget You Why Not Forget Myself (忘記你不如忘記自己) (Mandarin)
  - Composer: Johann Ziller, Claus Lessmann
  - Lyricist: Dave Wong (Cantonese), Cheung Fong-lo (Mandarin)
  - Singer: Dave Wong

== Box office ==
The film grossed HK$16,889,659 at the Hong Kong box office during its theatrical run from 13 June to 11 July 1991 in Hong Kong.

== Award nomination ==
- 11th Hong Kong Film Awards
  - Nominated: Best Original Film Song (The Days We Went Through Together (一起走過的日子) - Composer: William Hu, Lyricist: Siu Mei, Singer: Andy Lau)

== See also ==
- Andy Lau filmography
- Johnnie To filmography
