= Love for All Seasons (film) =

2003 Hong Kong film by Johnnie To and Wai Ka-fai

- Film poster
- Traditional Chinese: 百年好合
- Hanyu Pinyin: Baak nin ho hap
- Directed by: Johnnie To; Wai Ka-Fai
- Written by: Wai Ka-Fai; Yau Nai-hoi; Au Kin-yee; Yip Tin-shing; Tai Tak-Kwong
- Produced by: Johnnie To; Wai Ka-Fai
- Starring: Sammi Cheng; Louis Koo; Li Bingbing
- Cinematography: Cheng Siu-keung
- Edited by: Law Wing-cheung
- Music by: Cacine Wong
- Production companies: Milkyway Image (HK) Ltd. One Hundred Years of Film Company Limited
- Distributed by: China Star Entertainment (Hong Kong)
- Release date: 23 January 2003 (Hong Kong)
- Running time: 93 minutes
- Country: Hong Kong
- Language: Cantonese

Love for All Seasons (百年好合) is a 2003 Cantonese-language Hong Kong romantic comedy film co-directed by Johnnie To and Wai Ka-Fai.

== Plot ==
Hong Kong businessman Tiger Hung experiences difficulty urinating due to an ailment received from his playboy ways. He is advised by a coworker to travel to Mount Omei in Sichuan Province to seek a medical cure. There Tiger finds a temple housing a clan of female martial artists and obtains help for his condition from the headmistress May.

Misery, the true leader of the clan who has been away from the temple while suffering from heartbreak, returns and threatens to kill all of the martial artists of Mount Omei and then herself unless May can defeat her in a duel, revealing that only the "Heartbreak Sword" technique can defeat her. Experiencing heartbreak is a requirement for learning the "Heartbreak Sword" technique, but May has never experienced it. The martial artists reveal to May that Tiger seduced them all one by one and left them heartbroken before he returned to Hong Kong. May travels to Hong Kong to seek out Tiger Hung in order to experience heartbreak in preparation for learning the "Heartbreak Sword" technique.

After experiencing heartbreak in her relationship with Tiger, May returns to Mount Omei but is unable to defeat Misery. Tiger discovers an inscription left on a statue by the old Grand Master revealing the secrets of the "Eternal Harmony" technique, though May is still unable to defeat Misery. When Misery attempts a killing blow on May, Tiger blocks her sword with his body. This satisfies Misery, who says that Tiger has proven his affection for May. Misery recovers from her heartbreak, realizing that relationships can bring pain but also happiness. Misery is reappointed as leader of the clan, and Tiger takes May to the mountaintop to teach her the "Sons & Daughters" technique.

== Cast ==
- Sammi Cheng as May
- Louis Koo as Tiger Hung
- Li Bingbing as Li Mo Shau
- Belinda Hamnett as Cat
- Lam Suet as Fatty
- Emotion Cheung (張錦程) as Hung's Aide
- Ha Yu as Tiger's Father
- Wai Wah (衛華) as Omei's 4th sister disciple
- You Hang (游航) as Tiger's PRC employee
- Zhou Nan (周楠) as Tiger's PRC employee
- Rachel Ngan as Susan (Policewoman)
- Zuki Lee as Susan (Air Stewardess)
- Winston Yep King-Man (葉景文) as Doctor
- Law Wing-cheung as Taxi Driver (uncredited)
- Soi Cheang as Policeman
- Huang Lu

== Production ==
The film was shot in Hong Kong and Sichuan, China.

== Release ==
The film was released theatrically in Hong Kong on 23 January 2003. The film was given a II A rating.

== Reception ==
Reviewer Andrew Saroch of fareastfilms.com gave the film a rating of 4 out of 5 stars, writing, "With a bolshy heart beating within its frame that is resolutely Asian, ‘Love For All Seasons’ is a rom-com that refuses to be conventional. [...] ‘Love For All Seasons’ is a refreshing change from a cinematic staple and a reminder of the fact that To can impress no matter what genre he works within." The review concludes, "The concept may take a little getting used to, but ‘Love For All Seasons’ is a superior vehicle for Sammi Cheng and an enjoyable mixture of zany plot twists, comedy and romance. Difficult to describe and infectious throughout, this is an example of Hong Kong cinema playing to its localised strengths."

Reviewer Kozo of lovehkfilm.com wrote, "Johnnie To and Sammi Cheng usually equals a light, fun and surprisingly good time at the movies. Love For All Seasons is most definitely light, and it's even occasionally fun. But really, it's not that good."

Reviewer Derek Elley of Variety wrote, "Pic lacks the emotional undertow of its B.O. opponent, 'My Lucky Star,' but is overall better made and more accessible for Sinophile fest auds."

Reviewer Eugene of heroic-cinema.com wrote, "I really can’t say I didn’t enjoy Love for All Seasons – despite it being formualic [sic] and overly sentimental." The review concludes, "After all Love for All Seasons is an enjoyable film in its own right and another very cool film to join the ranks of some pretty decent films that seem to come out for Chinese New Year. Yes it is predictable. Yes it is overly sentimental. Still does not mean you cannot enjoy the film and put you in the right mood for the new year."

A review on rowereviews.com reads, "Conceptually and stylistically, Love For All Seasons has got to be one of the most manic film [sic] in all of Johnnie To's prolific oeuvre. Incorporating wuxia into the romantic comedy narrative structure, Love For All Seasons a high-concept comedy with a moderately perverse premise in which Playboy Louis Koo agrees to help a virginal martial arts guru master a technique that can only be learned by having one's heart broken. Injected with an energy that rivals even To's most dynamic action film, Love For All Seasons is in nearly in constant motion, matching its conceit with an infectious dynamism. Funny and charming, the conceptual absurdity is employed to reinforce the film's thematic intentions, exhibiting the elusivity of attempting to deconstruct affect. In Love For All Seasons, Love is portrayed as cognitively indiscernible, emotionally irrational, yet essential despite it remaining largely an emotion that exists outside of strict quantification or classification. A wild movie that moves with such vitality that it's hard not to appreciate its fervor".

Reviewer Ted Shen of chicagoreader.com wrote, "If Hong Kong comedy’s infinite capacity for outlandish plot turns, lowbrow humor, and shameless consumerism doesn’t wear you out, then you might be fitfully amused by this goofball item from the prolific team of Wai Ka-fai and Johnnie To."

A review on 2 Things @ Once called the film "Really fun." The review concludes, "Part quest for knowledge, part Pretty Woman, part Crouching Tiger Hidden Dragon, and all entertaining."

The review website the14amazons.com gave the film 2.5 out of 5 stars, calling it "forgettable". The review concludes, "Basically, LOVE FOR ALL SEASONS is a reasonably well made but ultimately disposable piece of fluff, made to satisfy conservative investors and a certain section of the audience that can still be made to go to see a local production if the right stars are in it. It's not a bad film, but it adds little to the world of cinema that hasn't been seen too many times before. Not recommended, not un-recommended. See it if you feel like it!"
