= Running Out of Time 2 =

2001 Hong Kong film by Johnnie To and Law Wing-cheung

- DVD cover
- Directed by: Johnnie To; Law Wing-cheung
- Written by: Yau Nai-Hoi; Au Kin-yee; Milkyway Creative Team
- Produced by: Johnnie To
- Starring: Lau Ching-wan; Ekin Cheng
- Cinematography: Cheng Siu-Keung
- Edited by: Law Wing-cheung; Yau Chi-wai
- Music by: Raymond Wong
- Production companies: One Hundred Years of Film; Milkyway Image
- Distributed by: China Star Entertainment Group
- Release date: 27 December 2001
- Country: Hong Kong
- Languages: Cantonese; English
- Box office: HK$5,937,545

Running Out of Time 2 (Chinese: 暗戰2, literal title:Hidden War 2) is a 2001 Hong Kong crime caper film co-directed by Johnnie To and Law Wing-cheung. It is a sequel to To's 1999 film Running Out of Time, with Lau Ching-wan returning as Inspector Ho Sheung-sang, who this time has to go after an elusive thief played by Ekin Cheng.

== Synopsis ==
The film brings back Inspector Ho Sheung-sang (Lau Ching-wan), this time to contend with another clever thief (Ekin Cheng, whose character is nameless). This time around, the thief is determined to extort money from a high-strung businesswoman (Kelly Lin) and play a few rounds of clever games with Ho in the process.

== Cast ==
- Lau Ching-wan - Inspector Ho Sheung Sang
- Ekin Cheng - The thief
- Kelly Lin - Teresa
- Hui Shiu-hung - Superintendent/Assistant Commander Wong Kai-fat
- Lam Suet - Ken
- Ruby Wong - Madam

== Awards ==
Golden Horse Film Festival

- Won: Best Action Choreography (Bruce Mang)
- Won: Best Film Editing (Law Wing-cheung and Yau Chi-wai)
- Nominated: Best Visual Effects (Stephen Ma)
- Nominated: Best Sound Effects
- Nominated: Best Cinematography (Cheng Siu-Keung)

Hong Kong Film Critics Society Awards

- Won: Film of Merit Award
