= The Big Heat (1988 film) =

1988 Hong Kong film by Johnnie To and Andrew Kam

- Film poster

Chinese name
- Traditional Chinese: 城市特警
- Simplified Chinese: 城市特警
Transcriptions
Standard Mandarin
- Hanyu Pinyin: Chéng Shì Tè Jǐng
Yue: Cantonese
- Jyutping: Sing4 Si2 Dak6 Ging2
- Directed by: Johnnie To; Andrew Kam
- Screenplay by: Gordon Chan
- Produced by: Tsui Hark
- Starring: Waise Lee; Joey Wong
- Cinematography: Wong Wing-hang
- Edited by: David Wu
- Music by: David Wu
- Production companies: Cinema City; Film Workshop
- Distributed by: Cinema City
- Release date: 22 September 1988
- Running time: 96 minutes
- Country: Hong Kong
- Language: Cantonese
- Box office: HK $4.076 million

The Big Heat (城市特警) is a 1988 Hong Kong action film starring Waise Lee and Joey Wong.

== Cast ==
- Waise Lee as Chief Inspector John Wai-Pong Wong
- Joey Wong as Ada
- Matthew Wong as Inspector Kwok-Keung Lun
- Philip Kwok as Detective Ah Kam

== Production ==
Johnnie To stated that "Tsui had lots of ideas [for The Big Heat], changing the script all the time, but three days later he would come up with something totally different." To went on to describe that the violence in the film originated from Hark's suggestions, and that it was "a very difficult project". To noted that he was brought in after another director was unable to satisfy Tsui Hark. To also stated that he did not complete the film, but that Tsui Hark completed it with Ching Siu-tung shooting some scenes.

== Release ==
The Big Heat was released in Hong Kong on 22 September 1988. It was described by Lisa Morton as a "minor box office disappointment", grossing HK$4.076 million and being the 94th-highest-grossing film in Hong Kong in 1988.

== Reception ==
Johnnie To reflected on the film in the late 1990s, stating that "it's good at places, but it was chaotic".

== Bibliography ==
- Morton, Lisa (2001). The Cinema of Tsui Hark. McFarland. ISBN 0786444606.
- Teo, Stephen (2007). Director in Action: Johnnie To and the Hong Kong Action Film. Hong Kong University Press. ISBN 9789622098398.
