= The Royal Scoundrel =

1991 Hong Kong film by Johnnie To

- Film poster

Chinese name
- Traditional Chinese: 沙灘仔與周師奶
- Simplified Chinese: 沙滩仔与周师奶
Transcriptions
Standard Mandarin
- Hanyu Pinyin: Shā Tān Zāi Yǔ Zhōu Shī Nǎi
Yue: Cantonese
- Jyutping: Saa1 Taan1 Zai2 Jyu2 Zau1 Si1 Naai1
- Directed by: Johnnie To; Jonathan Chik
- Screenplay by: Tsang Kan-cheung
- Produced by: Raymond Wong
- Starring: Tony Leung; Ng Man-tat; Jacklyn Wu; Waise Lee
- Cinematography: Horace Wong
- Edited by: OH Film Post Production Workshop
- Music by: William Wu
- Production companies: Cinema City; Paka Film Production
- Distributed by: Golden Princess Amusement
- Release date: 10 January 1991
- Running time: 89 minutes
- Country: Hong Kong
- Language: Cantonese
- Box office: HK$6,363,006

The Royal Scoundrel (沙灘仔與周師奶) is a 1991 Hong Kong comedy film directed by Johnnie To and Jonathan Chik. The film stars Tony Leung Chiu-wai, Ng Man-tat, Jacklyn Wu, and Waise Lee. It was released on 10 January 1991.

== Plot ==
A fiery-tempered cop, "beach boy", and his deeply bonded yet timid and cowardly partner, Chow, investigate a case together. During the process, beach boy encounters Yuk, an orphaned young girl. However, their relationship is soon disrupted by their newly appointed superior, Lee Nam, who wins Yuk's affection. Lee Nam further plots an illegal gold trade and attempts to frame beach boy while reaping the benefits for himself. In the end, with Yuk's help, beach boy orchestrates a plan that leads the gangsters to eliminate Lee Nam.

== Cast ==
- Tony Leung Chiu-Wai as Beach Boy
- Ng Man-tat as Chow
- Jacklyn Wu as Yuk
- Waise Lee as Lee Nam
- Wong Tin-lam
- Alan Chui Chung-San as Lo To Keung
- Wong Yat Fei as Rusty
- Lam Chung
