= Chasing Dream =

2019 Hong Kong-Chinese film by Johnnie To

- Theatrical release poster
- 我的拳王男友
- Directed by: Johnnie To
- Screenplay by: Wai Ka-fai; Mak Tin-shu; Ray Chan; Angus Chan
- Story by: Wai Ka-fai
- Produced by: Johnnie To; Wai Ka-fai; Elaine Chu
- Starring: Jacky Heung; Wang Keru
- Cinematography: Alan Cheng
- Edited by: Allen Leung
- Music by: Peter Kam
- Production companies: Hero Star Movie Cultural (Beijing) iQIYI Motion Pictures; China Film Co-Production Corporation; China Star Movie; Milkyway Image
- Distributed by: China Star Entertainment Group; Universe Entertainment
- Release date: 8 November 2019 (China)
- Running time: 118 minutes
- Countries: Hong Kong; China
- Language: Mandarin
- Box office: $3.4 million

Chasing Dream (Chinese: 我的拳王男友) is a 2019 romantic comedy drama film directed by Johnnie To and co-produced with Wai Ka-fai, who also co-wrote the screenplay. A Hong Kong-Chinese co-production, the film stars Jacky Heung and Wang Keru, and tells the story of a boxing champion and a dream-chasing singer who met and became friends together by chance while chasing their dreams.

The film was released in China on 8 November 2019.

== Plot ==
Tiger, an aspiring MMA fighter, meets Cuckoo, whose dream is to become a singer. Together they go from audition to audition as they try to get Cuckoo into the talent show Perfect Diva. And at the same time, Tiger tries to quit the ring, but leaving turns out to be harder than expected. Both Tiger and Cuckoo have the same state of mind and fight for their dream, and even if the two burn their lives, they will have no regrets in this life.

== Cast ==
- Jacky Heung as Tiger
- Wang Keru as Cuckoo
- Shao Bing as Ma Qing
- Bin Zi as Gao Qiang
- Wu Yitong as Zhao Ying
- Ma Xiaohui as Qu Fengfeng
- Kelly Yu as Hai Zhu
- Emotion Cheung as Lu Di
- Candy Zhang as Dr. Li

== Reception ==
Reviewer Richard Kuipers of Variety wrote, "Poking fun at blind ambition and celebrity culture while propelling viewers on a dizzy ride of heightened realism and unabashed melodrama, 'Chasing Dream' has some clunky plot contrivances and lacks emotional depth, but for sheer entertainment value, it delivers handsomely."

Reviewer Diego Aparico of EasternKicks gave the film a rating of 2.5 out of 5 stars, writing, "When you sign up to watch a film that combines martial arts with musical elements, you know what you’re getting yourself into. Chasing Dream is not an arthouse film or an experimental indie production. It is a bonafide B movie, with strong elements from the world of sports and pop music entertainment. You won't watch it looking for inspiration, or expecting to see performances that justify the title. If, on the other hand, you’re looking for something flashy and upbeat that doesn't require too much thinking for some nighttime viewing, then look no further."

Reviewer Adriana Rosati of Asian Movie Pulse wrote, "'Chasing Dream' is a distinctly Chinese-flavoured hot pot, composed of a mixture of many boxing drama tropes (especially that well-known American long saga, but let's just don't mention it for a change), many To's plotlines from previous films, the popular realm of X Factor-style music competition franchises and a sprinkle of Bollywood. In fact, if director To could get one penny every time the audience spots a reference, he wouldn't need to charge for the entrance ticket. This is not all bad, as we love repetitions; it is sweet being enveloped by familiar waters and drown happily in them, but this hot pot, despite being very colourful, lacks a bit in hot spices."

Reviewer Andrew Crump of theplaylist.net wrote, "To's application of old formulas reemphasizes why these formulas stay in use to this day: They work. But To is an exceptional filmmaker, capable of drawing every last atom of glee out of each scene".

Reviewer Darren Murray of maactioncinema.com gave the film a rating of 3.8/5, writing, "Initially I was disappointed that Johnnie To’s first film in three years wouldn’t be a return to the crime genre but I have to say that Chasing Dream is more than I could have asked for, with its mixture of drama, comedy, action and musical numbers unlike anything else that is playing at Fantasia 2020."

Reviewer Lawrence Garcia of InReview wrote, "what the film lacks in sophistication it makes up for with sheer exuberance, nonetheless tempered by a certain respect for those that have come before."

Reviewer Rob Aldam of backseatmafia.com wrote, "Chasing Dream is a slick and vibrant portrait of two ambitious characters weighed down by their pasts. It’s an editing masterclass, beautifully cut and shot to leave you wanting more. The fight scenes are expertly done whilst there’s a wonderful chemistry between the two leads. Wang particularly impresses, she’s a star in the making. It’s a rich and colourful film, brimming with energy and youthful vibrancy. Chasing Dream will take your breath away."

Reviewer Lee B. Gordon III of Film Combat Syndicate wrote that the film "guaranteeably delivers a sprightly, picaresque underdog romance tale with surprising moments, a timbre that never lets up, and an ending that would have Rocky fans standing up and cheering."

Reviewer J. Hurtado of ScreenAnarchy wrote that the film "is entertaining, there's really no denying that, it's just kind of a mess at the same time."

Reviewer Jared Mobarek of The Film Stage gave the film a B rating, calling it "a hilarious genre mash-up" and writing, "I think its success is largely due to the fact it doesn’t solely rely on one genre. By complementing its rom-com infrastructure with sports and musical tropes, no single aspect is allowed to become stale. That’s not to say it’s perfect or that some sub-plots don’t take too long to circle back to for closure, but joining so many disparate parts together at all is a feat deserving notice."
