= Yesterday Once More (2004 film) =

2004 Hong Kong film by Johnnie To

- DVD cover
- Directed by: Johnnie To
- Written by: The Hermit; Au Kin-yee
- Produced by: Johnnie To
- Starring: Andy Lau; Sammi Cheng
- Cinematography: Cheng Siu-Keung
- Edited by: Law Wing-cheung; David Richardson
- Music by: Ben Cheung; Chung Chi-wing
- Production companies: Media Asia Films; Sil-Metropole Organisation; Milkyway Image
- Distributed by: Media Asia Distributions
- Release date: 14 October 2004
- Running time: 98 minutes
- Country: Hong Kong
- Language: Cantonese
- Box office: HK$15,477,157

Yesterday Once More (traditional Chinese: 龍鳳鬥; simplified Chinese: 龙凤斗; Jyutping: lung4 fung6 dau3) is a 2004 Hong Kong romantic comedy caper film produced and directed by Johnnie To and starring Andy Lau and Sammi Cheng.

== Plot ==
Andy Lau and Sammi Cheng star as Mr. and Mrs. Thief, a husband and wife team of super-thieves. After a successful diamond robbery, the two get into an argument about how the loot should be split up and the husband leaves.

Two years later, Mrs Thief is on the verge of remarrying although her affections lie more with the expensive necklace belonging to her fiancé's mother-in-law than with the husband to be. When a plot to steal the necklace ends up falling into the hands of Mr. Thief, the couple are forced together again.

== Cast ==
- Andy Lau as Mr. Thief
- Sammi Cheng as Mrs. Thief
- Jenny Hu as Mrs. Allen
- Carl Ng as Steve
- Gordon Lam as Insurance surveyor
- Chun Wong as Private investigator
- Benz Hui as Private investigator
- Teddy Lin as Police detective
- Courtney Wu as Wine cellar owner
- Yu Ngai-ho as Lawyer
- Hon Ping as Hired thief/Runner
- Kam Loi-kwan as Hired thief
- Ronald Yan as Police detective
- Li Shing-cheong as Doctor
- Leung Pok-yan as Hired thief
- Chiu Chi-sing
