= Drug War (film) =

2012 Chinese-Hong Kong film by Johnnie To

- Film poster
- Directed by: Johnnie To
- Written by: Wai Ka-Fai; Yau Nai-hoi; Ryker Chan; Yu Xi
- Produced by: Johnnie To; Wai Ka-Fai
- Starring: Sun Honglei; Louis Koo; Huang Yi; Wallace Chung
- Cinematography: Cheng Siu-Keung; To Hung-Mo
- Edited by: David Richardson; Allen Leung
- Music by: Xavier Jamaux
- Production companies: Beijing Hairun Pictures; Milkyway Image
- Distributed by: Media Asia Distribution (Hong Kong); Variance Films (North America); Huaxia Film Distribution; Golden Network Asia (International Sales)
- Release dates: November 15, 2012 (Rome Film Festival); April 2, 2013 (Mainland China); April 18, 2013 (Hong Kong); July 26, 2013 (North America)
- Running time: 105 minutes
- Countries: China; Hong Kong
- Languages: Mandarin; Cantonese
- Box office: US$24.7 million

Drug War
- Simplified Chinese: 毒战
- Traditional Chinese: 毒戰
Transcriptions
Standard Mandarin
- Hanyu Pinyin: Dú zhàn
Yue: Cantonese
- Jyutping: duk6 zin3

Drug War (simplified Chinese: 毒战; traditional Chinese: 毒戰) is a 2012 action thriller film directed and produced by Johnnie To. A Chinese-Hong Kong co-production, the film stars Sun Honglei as Police Captain Zhang, who partners with a drug lord named Timmy Choi (Louis Koo) after Choi is arrested. To avoid the death penalty, Choi agrees to reveal information about his partners' methamphetamine ring. Zhang starts to harbor doubts about Choi's honesty as the police begin to take on the drug ring.

The film premiered at the Rome Film Festival on November 15, 2012. It has received positive reviews.

== Plot ==
Fleeing from an explosion at his drug manufacturing facility, Timmy Choi crashes his car into a restaurant and as he revives he is captured by Captain Zhang Lei. Realizing that he will receive the death penalty for his crimes, he bargains information on his colleagues to survive and introduces Captain Zhang Lei as "Uncle Bill", to become a supplier to Haha, who owns a port and can distribute drugs to other countries. Captain Zhang Lei poses as Haha to the real "Uncle Bill". Choi goes to his factory where he meets with his two mute employee brothers. Choi plants recording devices in his factory, setting up everyone in it. Then they set up the real Haha with the real Uncle Bill. However, an attempt to capture the mute brothers at the factory fails, and they escape through a hidden tunnel. Captain Zhang is livid at Choi for withholding information about the secret exit, which has cost the lives of several police team members.

Choi pleads for a second chance as "Uncle Bill" is really just a front for 7 influential Hong Kong gangsters whom he did not wish to rat out because 2 of them are his relatives as they are his brother and godfather. The next day, Captain Zhang poses as Haha again and meets with "Uncle Bill". They negotiate a deal to distribute drugs using Haha's port, while Choi identifies the 7 gangsters's bosses. Later they discuss terms of the deal at a nightclub, where Captain Zhang, posing as Haha, accuses "Uncle Bill" of being a cop, pretending to be infuriated. The big 7 confront him in the parking garage, revealing their identities and confirming their business relationship. On the day after that, Choi leads the big 7 and their entourage to the port, but instead pulls the entourage in front of a primary school as parents and children are arriving for the day.

Choi removes his wires and reveals to the big 7 that he has ratted them out and they are surrounded by cops. Realizing that something has gone wrong, Captain Zhang and his officers close in. A shootout ensues, and nearly all of the gangsters, along with several officers, are killed. Choi escapes in a school bus. However, he crashes into the escaping mute brothers as they are fleeing, believing that Choi has ratted them out. Another shootout takes place. Captain Zhang, wounded, arrives with several other wounded comrades to stop the mute brothers. Though the mute brothers are killed, the cops are all severely wounded from the shootout. Choi who was handcuffed earlier by Zhang escapes and uses the opportunity to fatally gun down Zhang and the other officers, but Zhang is able to handcuff himself to Choi's leg before he dies. Choi is then captured by SWAT reinforcements before he can escape. Choi begs them for another chance to live by trading more information on other gangsters, but is executed by lethal injection.

== Cast ==
- Louis Koo as Choi Tin-ming/Timmy Choi (Chinese: 蔡添明; Jyutping: coi3 tim1 ming4; pinyin: Cài Tiānmíng)
- Sun Honglei as Captain Zhang Lei (simplified Chinese: 张雷; traditional Chinese: 張雷; pinyin: Zhāng Léi)
- Huang Yi as Yang Xiaobei (小贝; 小貝; Xiǎobèi)
- Wallace Chung as Guo Weijun (郭伟军; 郭偉軍; Guō Wěijūn)
- Gao Yunxiang as Xu Guoxiang
- Li Guangjie as Chen Shixiong (陈世雄; 陳世雄; Chén Shìxióng)
- Guo Tao as Senior Dumb
- Li Jing as Junior Dumb
- Lo Hoi-pang as Birdie
- Eddie Cheung as Su
- Gordon Lam as East Lee (李阿东; 李阿東; Lǐ Ā-dōng)
- Michelle Ye as Sal (萨婆; 薩婆; Sàpó)
- Lam Suet as Fatso

== Production ==
The film was billed as To's first action film to be entirely shot and set in mainland China. To had previously shot the romance film Romancing in Thin Air in China.

== Style ==
Variety wrote that the film does not have the same feeling as To's similar Hong Kong films such as Election or Sparrow and that the film was also "actually quite light on action." Film Business Asia noted that "To has modified his style to take account of the Mainland's different look and more spacious geography, as well as appearing to be newly energised by the challenge of what he can get away with."

== Awards and nominations ==
Organization	Award category	Recipients and nominees	Result
Online Film Critics Society Awards 2013	Best Film		Nominated
Online Film Critics Society Awards 2013	Best Foreign Language Film		Nominated
Online Film Critics Society Awards 2013	Best Editing	Allen Leung	Nominated
San Diego Film Critics Society	Best Foreign Language Film		Won
14th Chinese Film Media Awards	Best Film		Won
14th Chinese Film Media Awards	Best Director	Johnnie To	Won

== Release ==
Drug War premiered at the Rome Film Festival on November 15, 2012. The film was the second "surprise film" from Asia at the festival, with the first being Back to 1942. The film was released on April 2, 2013, in China and earned US$13,070,000 for its opening week, coming in third place at the Chinese box office behind The Chef, the Actor, the Scoundrel and Finding Mr. Right. The film grossed a total of $23,180,000 in China. The film opened in Hong Kong on April 18, 2013, and grossed US$376,577 in its opening weekend, making it the second highest-grossing film at the Hong Kong box office, beaten only by Oblivion. The film grossed a total of US$639,155 in Hong Kong.

The film continues to maintain popularity and was highlighted in the Masters section of the 2013 San Diego Asian Film Festival.

Drug War was released on October 15, 2013, on DVD and Blu-ray Disc.

In the United Kingdom, the film's television airing was watched by 142,400 viewers on Channel 4 in 2016, making it the year's most-watched foreign language film on Channel 4 and seventh most-watched foreign language film on UK television.

== Reception ==
Review aggregator Rotten Tomatoes gives the film a score of 94% based on 47 reviews, with an average rating of 8/10. The critical consensus states: "A taut, solidly constructed action thriller with uncommon intelligence, Drug War delivers exhilarating set pieces without skimping on sophisticated filmmaking." At Metacritic, which assigns a rating out of 100 to reviews from mainstream critics, the film has received a score of 86, based on 19 reviews. IndieWire gave the film a B rating, stating that the film confirms director Johnnie To's status as "a first-rate genre filmmaker. That said, the film does not innovate or break any new ground". Variety praised the film, stating that it was "light on action but so well-scripted and shot, it's nonetheless edge-of-your-seat material."

At the 7th Asian Film Awards, Drug War was nominated for Best Film, Best Screenwriter (Wai Ka-fai, Yau Nai-hoi, Ryker Chan, Yu Xi), and Best Editing (David Richardson, Allen Leung).

== Remake ==
In 2014, it was announced that there would be a South Korean remake of the film. In July 2017, the film was confirmed to be directed by Lee Hae-young, starring Cho Jin-woong in the lead role and Ryu Jun-yeol as the drug dealer. The theatrical release was planned for the following year.
