= Wai Ka-fai =

Hong Kong filmmaker

- 韋家輝
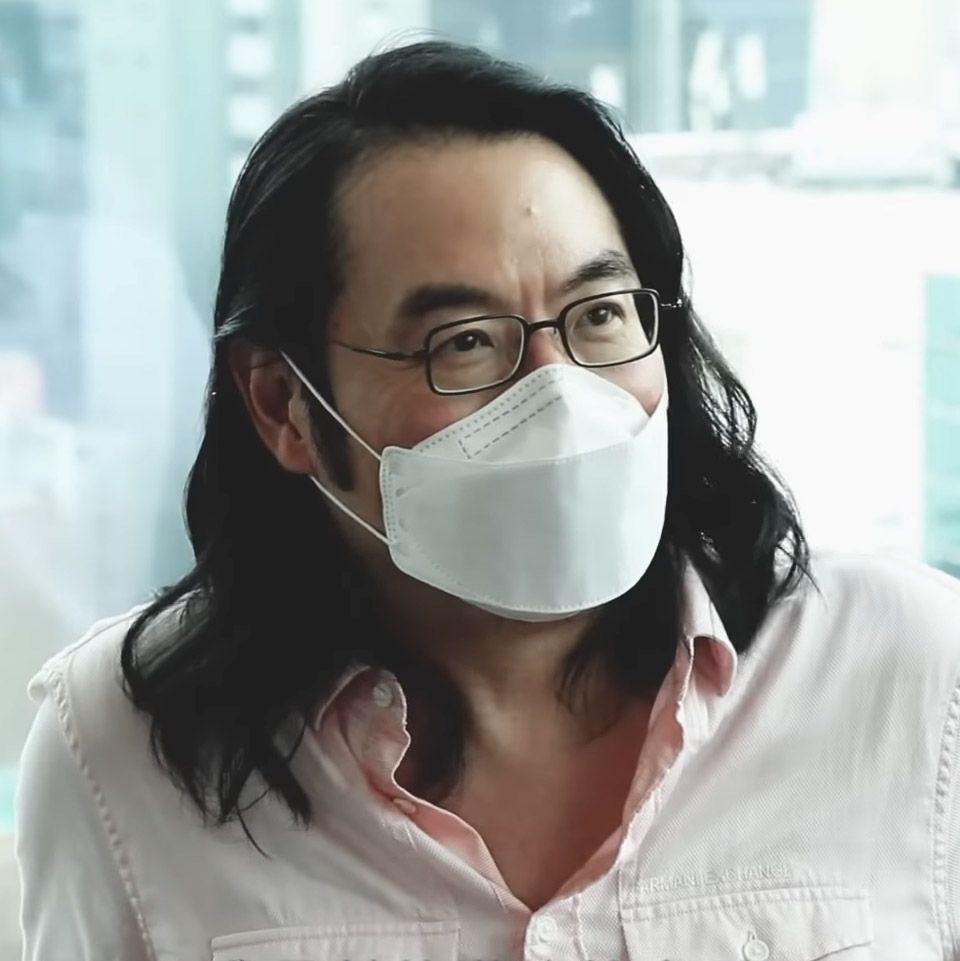
- Wai in 2022
- Born: 21 September 1962 (age 63) (Note: According to Wai in a March 8, 2011 interview, his birthday on the lunar calendar is Wong Tai Sin's birthday. Because Wong's birthday is celebrated on the 23rd of the eighth lunar month, while Wai was born in 1962, and after comparing with the perpetual calendar, it was found that his full New Calendar birth date is September 21, 1962.); British Hong Kong
- Occupations: Film director; screenwriter; film producer
- Years active: 1985 – present
- Relatives: Willie Wai (brother)

Chinese name
- Traditional Chinese: 韋家輝
- Simplified Chinese: 韦家辉
Transcriptions
Standard Mandarin
- Hanyu Pinyin: wei2 jiā1 huī4
Yue: Cantonese
- Jyutping: wai4 ga1 fai1

Wai Ka-fai (born 21 September 1962) is a Hong Kong filmmaker. Best known for his frequent collaborations with Johnnie To, he co-formed Milkyway Image in 1996, which is now one of the most successful independent film studios in Hong Kong.

The films that Wai and To have made together as directors and producers include Needing You..., Fat Choi Spirit, Love on a Diet, Fulltime Killer, Turn Left, Turn Right, Running on Karma, and Mad Detective. His solo directorial efforts include Too Many Ways to Be No. 1, Written By and Detective vs Sleuths, which the latter helped him won the Hong Kong Film Award for Best Director.

Two of his films were released in the US theatrically: Fulltime Killer and Mad Detective.

== Filmography ==
=== Television series ===
Year	Title	Role
1982	Demi-Gods and Semi-Devils	Writer
1982	Soldier of Fortune	Writer
1983	The Old Miao Myth	Writer
1983	The Return of the Condor Heroes	Writer
1984	The Duke of Mount Deer	Writer
1984	Police Cadet '84	Writer
1985	Police Cadet '85	Writer
1985	The Young Wanderer	Writer
1986	The Feud of Two Brothers	Writer
1988	The Final Verdict	Writer
1989	Looking Back in Anger	Producer
1989	War of the Dragon	Producer
1990	Heaven's Retribution	Producer
1992	The Greed of Man	Producer
1993	Racing Peak	Producer
1997	Intruder	Producer
2000	Divine Retribution	Producer

=== Feature film ===
Year	Film	Credit(s)			Notes
Year	Film	Director	Screenwriter	Producer	Notes
1985	Young Cops	No	Yes	No	—N/a
1987	Easy Money	No	Yes	No	—N/a
1988	It's No Heaven	No	Yes	No	—N/a
1990	The Story of My Son	No	Yes	No	—N/a
1992	Gun n' Rose	No	Yes	No	—N/a
1995	Peace Hotel	Yes	Yes	No	Feature directorial debut Also co-wrote the story with Donald Chow
1997	Too Many Ways to Be No. 1	Yes	Yes	No	Won – Golden Bauhinia Awards for Best Screenplay; Won – Hong Kong Film Critics Society Award for Film of Merit
1997	The Odd One Dies	No	Yes	Yes	—N/a
1997	Intruder	No	No	Yes	—N/a
1998	The Longest Nite	No	No	Yes	—N/a
1998	Expect the Unexpected	No	No	Yes	—N/a
1998	A Hero Never Dies	No	No	Yes	—N/a
1999	Where a Good Man Goes	No	No	Yes	Also as the story writer
2000	Needing You...	Yes	Yes	Yes	Co-directed and produced with Johnnie To; Nominated – Hong Kong Film Award for Best Director; Nominated – Hong Kong Film Award for Best Film
2000	Help!!!	Yes	Yes	Yes	Co-directed and produced with Johnnie To
2001	Wu yen	Yes	Yes	Yes	Co-directed and produced with Johnnie To
2001	Love on a Diet	Yes	Yes	Yes	Co-directed and produced with Johnnie To; Nominated – Hong Kong Film Award for Best Director; Nominated – Hong Kong Film Award for Best Film
2001	Fulltime Killer	Yes	Yes	Yes	Co-directed and produced with Johnnie To
2002	Fat Choi Spirit	Yes	Yes	Yes	Co-directed and produced with Johnnie To; Won – Hong Kong Film Critics Society Award for Film of Merit
2002	My Left Eye Sees Ghosts	Yes	Yes	Yes	Co-directed and produced with Johnnie To
2003	Love for All Seasons	Yes	Yes	Yes	Co-directed and produced with Johnnie To
2003	Turn Left, Turn Right	Yes	Yes	Yes	Co-directed and produced with Johnnie To
2003	Running on Karma	Yes	Yes	Yes	Co-directed and produced with Johnnie To; Won – Hong Kong Film Award for Best Film; Won – Hong Kong Film Critics Society Award for Film of Merit; Nominated – Hong Kong Film Award for Best Director; Nominated – Golden Bauhinia Award for Best Director; Nominated – Golden Bauhinia Award for Best Film; Nominated – Chinese Film Media Award for Best Director (Hong Kong/Taiwan region); Nominated – Chinese Film Media Award for Best Film (Hong Kong/Taiwan region)
2004	Fantasia	Yes	Yes	Yes	—N/a
2005	Himalaya Singh	Yes	Yes	Yes	—N/a
2006	The Shopaholics	Yes	Yes	Yes	—N/a
2007	Mad Detective	Yes	Yes	Yes	Co-directed and produced with Johnnie To; Won – Hong Kong Film Critics Society Award for Film of Merit; Won – Hong Kong Film Critics Society Award for Screenplay; Won – Hong Kong Film Award for Best Screenplay; Nominated – Hong Kong Film Critics Society Award for Best Director; Nominated – Hong Kong Film Critics Society Award for Best Film; Nominated – Hong Kong Film Award for Best Director; Nominated – Hong Kong Film Award for Best Film; Nominated – Golden Lion
2009	Vengeance	No	Yes	Yes	Nominated – Palme d'Or
2009	Written By	Yes	Yes	Yes	Won – Hong Kong Film Critics Society Award for Film of Merit; Won – Hong Kong Film Critics Society Award for Best Screenplay; Nominated – Asian Film Award for Best Screenplay; Nominated – Hong Kong Film Award for Best Screenplay
2011	Don't Go Breaking My Heart	Yes	Yes	Yes	—N/a
2012	Romancing in Thin Air	No	Yes	Yes	Won – Hong Kong Film Critics Society Award for Film of Merit
2012	Drug War	No	Yes	Yes	Won – San Diego Film Critics Society Award for Best Foreign Language Film; Won – Hong Kong Film Critics Society Award for Film of Merit; Won – Hong Kong Film Critics Society Award for Best Film; Won – Chinese Film Media Award for Best Film (China region); Nominated – Golden Horse Award for Best Feature Film
2013	Blind Detective	No	Yes	Yes	—N/a
2019	Chasing Dream	No	Yes	Yes	—N/a
2022	Detective vs Sleuths	Yes	Yes	Yes	Won – Hong Kong Film Critics Society Award for Film of Merit; Won – Hong Kong Film Critics Society Award for Best Screenplay; Won – Hong Kong Film Critics Society Award for Best Director; Won – Hong Kong Film Award for Best Screenplay; Won – Hong Kong Film Award for Best Director; Nominated – Hong Kong Film Critics Society Award for Best Film; Nominated – Hong Kong Film Award for Best Film

== Awards and nominations ==
Year	Award	Category	Film	Result
2001	20th Hong Kong Film Awards	Best Director	Needing You...	Nominated
2001	20th Hong Kong Film Awards	Best Film	Needing You...	Nominated
2002	21st Hong Kong Film Awards	Best Director	Love on a Diet	Nominated
2002	21st Hong Kong Film Awards	Best Film	Love on a Diet	Nominated
2004	23rd Hong Kong Film Awards	Best Director	Running on Karma	Nominated
2004	23rd Hong Kong Film Awards	Best Film	Running on Karma	Won
2004	23rd Hong Kong Film Awards	Best Screenplay	Running on Karma	Won
2008	27th Hong Kong Film Awards	Best Director	Mad Detective	Nominated
2008	27th Hong Kong Film Awards	Best Film	Mad Detective	Nominated
2008	27th Hong Kong Film Awards	Best Screenplay	Mad Detective	Won
2010	29th Hong Kong Film Awards	Best Screenplay	Written By	Nominated
2023	41st Hong Kong Film Awards	Best Director	Detective vs Sleuths	Won
2023	41st Hong Kong Film Awards	Best Film	Detective vs Sleuths	Nominated
2023	41st Hong Kong Film Awards	Best Screenplay	Detective vs Sleuths	Won
