= A Moment of Romance III =

1996 Hong Kong film by Johnnie To

A Moment of Romance III 天若有情III烽火佳人
- Film poster
- Directed by: Johnnie To
- Written by: Yau Nai-Hoi; Sandy Shaw
- Produced by: Johnnie To
- Starring: Andy Lau; Jacklyn Wu; Alex Fong
- Cinematography: Hang Sang Poon
- Edited by: Wong Wing Ming
- Music by: William Hu; Raymond Wong
- Production company: Win's Entertainment
- Distributed by: Sam Bo; Fortune Star Media Ltd.
- Release date: 28 March 1996
- Running time: 95 minutes
- Country: Hong Kong
- Language: Cantonese
- Box office: HK$14,461,192

A Moment of Romance III is a 1996 Hong Kong romance film directed by Johnnie To starring Andy Lau. Although the third in the series of "A Moment of Romance" films, it shares nothing in terms of characters, plot and setting with the first two films.

== Summary ==
Set during World War II, Lau Tin-Wai (Andy Lau) is a fighter pilot in the Chinese airforce who is forced to ditch in a field; he is taken in by the remote community of farmers who nurse him back to health, and here he meets Ting Siu-Wo, a young woman who falls in love with him.

== Statistics ==
Circuit: Newport

Rating: II A (Hong Kong)

Theatrical run: 28 March 1996 – 24 April 1996

Box Office: HK$14,461,192.00

== Cast ==
- Andy Lau
- Jacklyn Wu
- Alex Fong
