= Johnnie To =

Hong Kong filmmaker (born 1955)

Johnnie To MH
- 杜琪峯
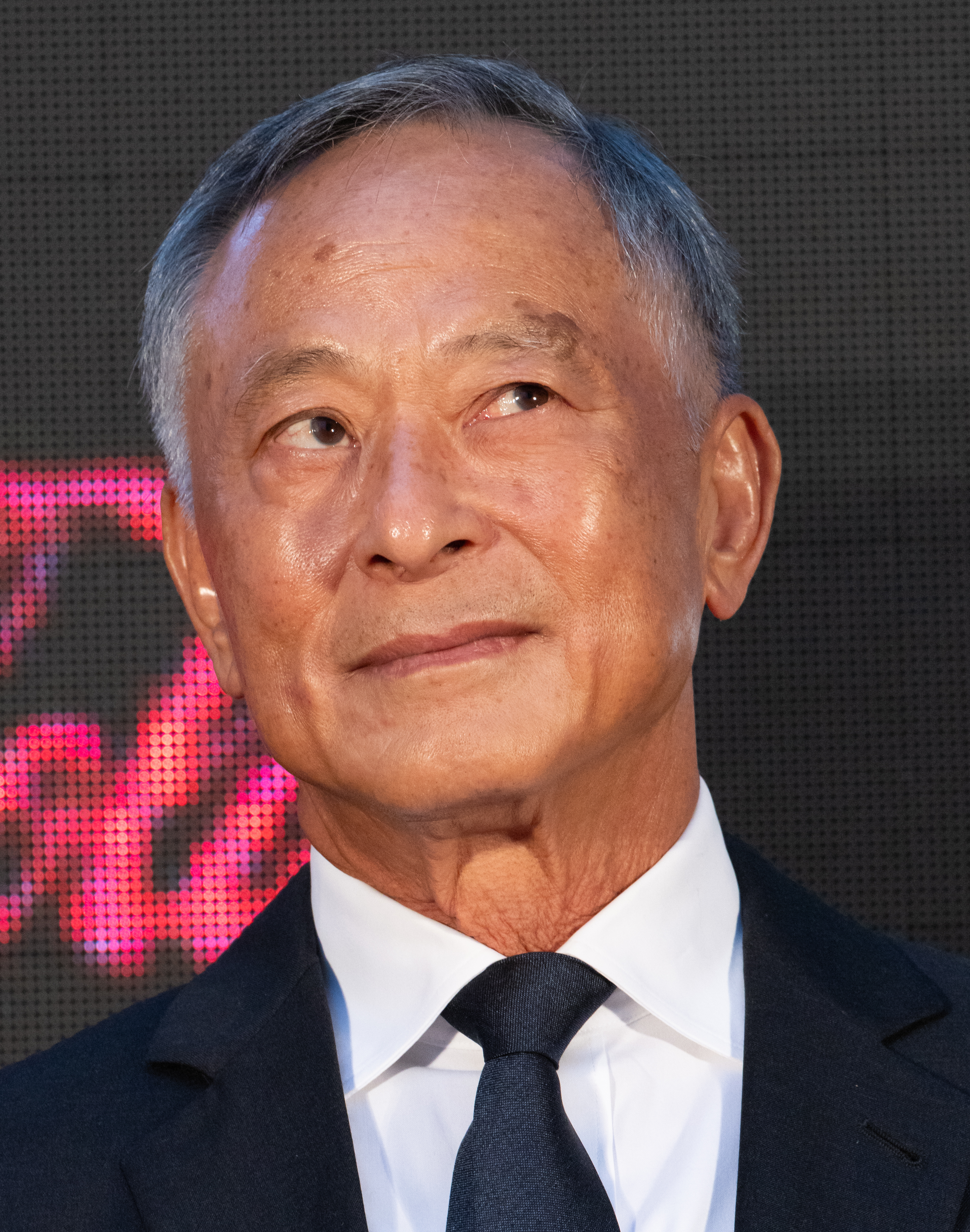
- To at the 2024 Tokyo International Film Festival
- Born: Johnnie To Kei-fung; 22 April 1955 (age 71); Sham Shui Po, Kowloon, British Hong Kong
- Occupations: Film director; film producer; screenwriter
- Years active: 1972–present
- Notable work: Full list
- Spouse: Wong Po-ling (m. 1978)
- Awards: Full list

Chinese name
- Traditional Chinese: 杜琪峯
- Simplified Chinese: 杜琪峰
Transcriptions
Standard Mandarin
- Hanyu Pinyin: Dù Qífēng
Yue: Cantonese
- Jyutping: dou6 kei4 fung1

Johnnie To Kei-fung (Note: simplified Chinese: 杜琪峰; traditional Chinese: 杜琪峯; pinyin: Dù Qífēng; Jyutping: dou6 kei4 fung1) (born 22 April 1955) is a Hong Kong filmmaker. Widely regarded as a pivotal figure of the Hong Kong New Wave and in contemporary Hong Kong cinema, he is best known internationally for his highly stylized action, crime, and triad films. His work, often brought to life through a recurring ensemble of cast and crew members, is characterized by its exploration of themes, including friendship, fate, ironies of life, and the rapidly changing face of Hong Kong society.

Born in Kowloon, To started his career as a messenger for TVB in 1972. After rising through the ranks to become a television producer and director, he made his feature film debut with The Enigmatic Case (1980). In 1996, he and his frequent collaborator Wai Ka-fai founded the production company Milkyway Image, through which he helped redefine the post-1997 landscape of Hong Kong filmmaking with critically acclaimed thrillers, including The Mission (1999), PTU (2003), Breaking News (2004), the Election duology (2005–2006), Exiled (2006), Vengeance (2009), and Drug War (2012). Beyond crime films, he also achieved significant commercial success with romantic comedies and dramas, including Needing You... (2000), Life Without Principle (2011), the Don't Go Breaking My Heart duology (2011 and 2014), Blind Detective (2013), and Office (2015).

Throughout his career, To has won both the Hong Kong Film Award for Best Director and the Golden Horse Award for Best Director three times each, among his various accolades. His films remain regular fixtures at major international film festivals, frequently screening in competition at the Cannes, Venice, and Berlinale. Driven by a commitment to the local film industry, To also founded the Fresh Wave International Short Film Festival in 2005 to nurture and support emerging young filmmakers, which he also served as chairman.

== Career ==
=== 1972-1986: TVB and The Enigmatic Case ===
In 1972, after graduating from high school, To began his career as a messenger for the Hong Kong television station TVB, when he was 17. From there To moved up the ladder, working as an executive producer and director for TV shows starting in 1973. To was 25 when he released his first film in 1980, The Enigmatic Case, which was produced by a Chinese left-wing studio. The wuxia film was a box-office failure, and To returned to working in television. In 1983, he directed and screen-wrote the critically acclaimed The Legend of the Condor Heroes, a dramatised TV series based on the martial art novel of the same name by Jin Yong. In 1984, he directed the series The Duke of Mount Deer, also based on Jin Yong's novel The Deer and the Cauldron. As To was absent from Hong Kong feature filmmaking between 1980 to 1986, he did not contribute to the first wave of the Hong Kong New Wave cinematic renaissance.

=== 1986-1997: Comedies and commercial success ===
To returned to feature films in 1986, joining Cinema City Enterprises to release the comedy Happy Ghost III. In 1988, he co-directed The Big Heat, his first action movie. The end of the 1980s saw some of To's biggest commercial successes, the vast majority of which were comedies. His 1988 film The Eighth Happiness was that year's highest-grossing movie. While working as an assistant TV director during the Shaw Studios era, he directed the comedy All About Ah-Long (1989), which starred Chow Yun-fat and became one of the biggest box office hits that year. During this period, To also directed the films Casino Raiders II (1991), The Heroic Trio (1993), Executioners (1993), and Loving You (1995), establishing himself as a commercially successful filmmaker.

To also directed Stephen Chow's early comedies including Justice, My Foot! (1992) and The Mad Monk (1993), however his experience working with Chow on the latter film soured his view on filmmaking, and To considered leaving the business altogether.

In 1996, To and frequent collaborator Wai Ka-fai formed Milkyway Image, a production house specialising in cost-efficient independent films made by To and Wai, as well as their frequent collaborators from Law Wing-cheung to scriptwriter Yau Nai-hoi.

=== 1997-present: Critical acclaim and awards success ===
From 1999 to 2001, To was the chief operational officer of China Star Entertainment Group. To was appointed to the Hong Kong Arts Development Council in 2004 and soon after chaired its Film and Media Arts Group.

To served as a jury member at the 2011 Cannes Film Festival.

His film Life Without Principle (2011) was selected as the Hong Kong's entry for Best Foreign Language Film at the 85th Academy Awards, but did not make the shortlist.

In 2016, To served as the Jury President for the 10th Asian Film Awards.

In June 2017, To was invited to become a member of the Academy of Motion Picture Arts and Sciences.

In June 2019, To was announced as the Jury President for the 56th Golden Horse Awards, but resigned his position in September.

In February 2023, To served as a jury member at the 73rd Berlin International Film Festival.

=== Unrealised film projects ===
To has spoken repeatedly of his intention to make a third Election film, which would explore how the triads became "integrated into the 'good' side of society." However, he has referred to media censorship and the National Security Law as major obstacles to the production of the film, as well as his unwillingness to "bring too much trouble" to the Milkyway team.

== Festivals and recognition ==
Commercially successful in his native Hong Kong, To's films have regularly appeared at international festivals, most notably in Europe and North America. Six of To's films have been featured at the Cannes Film Festival: Breaking News (2004), Election was shown in Competition in 2005; its sequel, Election 2 (a.k.a. Triad Election, 2006), Triangle (2007), and Blind Detective (2013) were screened out-of-competition, while Vengeance (2009) competed for the Palme d'Or. At the Berlin International Film Festival, Sparrow was shown in competition in 2008. At the Venice International Film Festival, Throw Down was screened out-of-competition in 2004; Exiled (2006), Mad Detective (2007) and Life Without Principle (2011) were shown in competition.

In North America, To's films have been consistently screened at the Toronto International Film Festival. The Mission, Fulltime Killer, PTU, Breaking News, Throw Down and Mad Detective all screened between 1999 and 2007. In 2006, Election, Election 2, and Exiled were screened.

In 2005, To received the "Time Machine Career Achievement Award" at the Festival de Cine de Sitges, Europe's most prestigious film festival specializing in genre films. To was also honoured as a "Filmmaker in Focus" of the 2007 International Film Festival Rotterdam. In 2009, while Vengeance competed at Cannes, To was made an officer of the French Order of Arts and Letters by the French Minister of Culture in recognition of his films.

The annual Hong Kong International Film Festival held its 45th edition in April 2021 and To directed a segment of the 2020 anthology film Septet: The Story of Hong Kong along with Sammo Hung, Ann Hui, Patrick Tam, Tsui Hark, Yuen Woo-ping and Ringo Lam. The short films were shot entirely on 35mm film, each of them touching on a nostalgic and moving story set across different time periods, with every one being an ode to the city.

In 2024, To was appointed jury member at the 2024 Tokyo International Film Festival for its section 'International competition'.

== Political views ==
When asked if he was willing to work in mainland China as a filmmaker, To emphasised that he was willing to work in China as long as he was free to do what he wished, but that he would not make a film that he did not himself believe in. To added that he did not accept communism, citing a lack of freedom of speech, freedom of the press, and freedom of religion, and said that he could not accept China's claim of being a democratic country. He stated "Many Chinese producers came to talk with me and asked me to make a movie in China. I said, ‘Only if I can do everything my way and make the decisions – will you allow me to do this?’ No – they don’t want this."

== Personal life ==
To decided to emigrate to Canada in 1990 after the 1989 Tiananmen Square protests and massacre. He is a Canadian citizen and holds a Canadian passport, however he has stated that he does not want to leave Hong Kong until he "cannot accept the political situation here any longer". To stated that he does not identify as Chinese, but as a Canadian and a Hong Konger.

== Filmography ==
Directed features
Year	Title	Distribution
1980	The Enigmatic Case	—N/a
1986	Happy Ghost III	Golden Princess Amusement / D & B Films Co., Ltd.
1987	Seven Years Itch	Cinema City and Films Co.
1988	The Eighth Happiness	Cinema City and Films Co.
1988	The Big Heat	Cinema City and Films Co.
1989	All About Ah-Long	Cinema City and Films Co.
1990	The Fun, the Luck & the Tycoon	Golden Princess Amusement
1990	The Story of My Son	D & B Films Co., Ltd.
1991	The Royal Scoundrel	Golden Princess Amusement
1991	Casino Raiders II	Orange Sky Golden Harvest
1992	Lucky Encounter	Universe Films Distribution Co. Ltd.
1992	Justice, My Foot!	Shaw Brothers Studio
1993	The Heroic Trio	Newport Entertainment
1993	The Bare-Footed Kid	Newport Entertainment
1993	The Mad Monk	Shaw Brothers Studio
1993	Executioners	Newport Entertainment
1995	Loving You...	Intercontinental Film Distributors Ltd.
1996	A Moment of Romance III	Fortune Star Media Ltd.
1997	Lifeline	Shaw Brothers Studio
1998	The Longest Nite	Film City Limited
1998	A Hero Never Dies	Film City Limited
1999	Where a Good Man Goes	International Films Enterprise Ltd.
1999	Running Out of Time	China Star Entertainment Group
1999	The Mission	International Films Enterprise Ltd.
2000	Needing You...	China Star Entertainment Group
2000	Help!!!	Mei Ah Entertainment
2001	Wu Yen	China Star Entertainment Group
2001	Love on a Diet	China Star Entertainment Group
2001	Fulltime Killer	Teamwork Motion Pictures
2001	Running Out of Time 2	China Star Entertainment Group
2002	Fat Choi Spirit	China Star Entertainment Group
2002	My Left Eye Sees Ghosts	China Star Entertainment Group
2003	Love for All Seasons	China Star Entertainment Group
2003	PTU	Mei Ah Entertainment
2003	Turn Left, Turn Right	Warner Bros. Pictures
2003	Running on Karma	China Star Entertainment Group
2004	Breaking News	Media Asia Entertainment Group
2004	Throw Down	China Star Entertainment Group
2004	Yesterday Once More	Media Asia Entertainment Group
2005	Election	China Star Entertainment Group
2006	Election 2	China Star Entertainment Group
2006	Exiled	Media Asia Entertainment Group
2007	Triangle	Media Asia Entertainment Group
2007	Mad Detective	China Star Entertainment Group
2008	Linger	Sundream Motion Pictures
2008	Sparrow	Universe Films Distribution Co. Ltd.
2009	Vengeance	ARP Sélection / Media Asia Entertainment Group
2011	Don't Go Breaking My Heart	Media Asia Entertainment Group
2011	Life Without Principle	Media Asia Entertainment Group
2012	Romancing in Thin Air	Media Asia Entertainment Group
2012	Drug War	Media Asia Entertainment Group / Huaxia Film Distribution
2013	Blind Detective	Media Asia Entertainment Group
2014	Don't Go Breaking My Heart 2	Media Asia Entertainment Group
2015	Office	Edko Films
2016	Three	Media Asia Entertainment Group / iQIYI Motion Pictures
2019	Chasing Dream	China Star Entertainment Group

== Monographs ==
- Ingham, Michael (2009). Johnnie To Kei-Fung's PTU. Hong Kong: Hong Kong University Press. ISBN 9789622099197.
- Jost, Marie (February 2011). "The Rise of Johnnie To" (PDF). Hong Kong Cinemagic. Archived from the original (PDF) on 12 August 2011.
- Teo, Stephen (2007). Director in Action: Johnnie To and the Hong Kong Action Film. Hong Kong: Hong Kong University Press. ISBN 9789622098398. JSTOR j.ctt1xwdvq. OCLC 779899451. Archived from the original on 21 December 2012.
