= List of Hong Kong films of 2008 =

This article lists feature-length Hong Kong films released in 2008.

== Box office ==
The highest-grossing Hong Kong films released in 2008 by domestic box office gross revenue, are as follows:

Highest-grossing films released in 2008
Rank	Title	Domestic gross
1	CJ7	HK$51,440,832
2	Ip Man	HK$25,582,227
3	Red Cliff	HK$24,258,591
4	Three Kingdoms: Resurrection of the Dragon	HK$16,952,020
5	Connected	HK$13,646,886
6	L for Love, L for Lies	HK$12,521,745
7	Painted Skin	HK$10,382,972
8	Kung Fu Dunk	HK$10,382,972
9	La Lingerie	HK$8,543,149
10	The Beast Stalker	HK$7,986,256

== Releases ==
Title	Director	Cast	Genre	Notes
6th Floor Rear Flat II				
A Decade of Love				
All About Women	Tsui Hark	Kitty Zhang, Gwei Lun-mei, Zhou Xun, Alex Fong		
An Empress and the Warriors	Ching Siu-tung	Donnie Yen, Kelly Chen, Leon Lai	Action	
Ashes of Time Redux	Wong Kar-wai	Leslie Cheung, Tony Leung Ka-fai, Tony Leung Chiu-Wai, Jacky Cheung, Brigitte Lin, Maggie Cheung, Carina Lau, Charlie Yeung	Wuxia	
Ballistic				
Beast Stalker	Dante Lam	Nicholas Tse, Nick Cheung	Action/Adventure	
Besieged City	Lawrence Lau Kwok-Cheung	Tang Tak-Po, Wong Yat-Ho, Wong Hau-Yan, Joman Chiang Cho-Man, Jonathan Lee Yat-Sing		
Blood: The Last Vampire	Chris Nahon			
Bruce				
The Butterfly Lovers	Jingle Ma	Wu Chun, Charlene Choi, Hu Ge	Romance, Wuxia	
Champions		Dickie Cheung		Opening film at the 2008 Chinese American Film Festival
Chaos	Herman Yau	Gordon Lam, Kristal Tin, Andrew Lin, Charmaine Fong		
City Without Baseball	Lawrence Ah Mon	Ron Heung, Tze Chin, Leury Yu-Chung, Yuan Lin, John Tao Ji-Ching	Drama	Produced by Scud (stage name of Danny Cheng Wan-Cheung)
CJ7	Stephen Chow	Stephen Chow	Sci-fi/Comedy	
Coffee or Tea				
Concubine				
Connected	Benny Chan	Ye Liu, Louis Koo, Nick Cheung		
Crossed Lines 2				
Fatal Move	Dennis S.Y. Law	Sammo Hung, Simon Yam	Action/Crime drama	
The Forbidden Kingdom	Rob Minkoff	Jackie Chan, Jet Li, Collin Chou, Liu Yifei, Li Bingbing, Michael Angarano	Adventure / Martial arts	
Forgive and Forget				
Forever Enthralled	Chen Kaige	Leon Lai, Zhang Ziyi	Drama	
Green Mansion				
High Noon	Heiward Mak			
Hong Kong Bronx	Billy Chung	Jordan Chan	Crime drama	
I Come With the Rain				
Ip Man	Wilson Yip	Donnie Yen	Kung fu	
Jump				
Knitting	Yin Lichuan			
Kung Fu Dunk	Kevin Chu	Jay Chou, Eric Tsang, Charlene Choi, Wilson Chen, Bryan Leung	Action / Adventure / Martial arts	
Kung Fu Hip-Hop				
L For Love, L For Lies				
La Lingerie	Chan Hing-Kai; Janet Chun	Stephy Tang, Janice Man, Ronald Cheng	Comedy	
Legendary Assassin	Wu Jing; Nicky Li	Wu Jing, Celina Jade	Action	
Linger	Johnnie To	Vic Zhou, Li Bingbing		
Love Is Elsewhere				
The Luckiest Man	Lam Chi Chung	Natalis Chan, Yuen Qiu, Bosco Wong, Monica Chan, Danny Chan Kwok Kwan, Timmy Hung, Lam Chi Chung	Comedy	
Marriage Trap	Zhang Chen	Guo Tao		
Miao Miao				
Missing	Tsui Hark	Chang Chen, Isabella Leong, Angelica Lee, Tony Leung Ka-Fai		
The Moss	Derek Kwok	Shawn Yue, Bonnie Sin, Louis Fan, Eric Tsang, Liu Kai-chi, Siu Yam-yam		
My Wife is a Gambling Maestro	Wong Jing	Nick Cheung, Natalie Meng Yao	Comedy	
Nobody's Perfect		Kary Ng, Stephy Tang		
Ocean Flame		Simon Yam		
Painted Skin	Gordon Chan	Donnie Yen, Chen Kun, Zhou Xun, Zhao Wei, Betty Sun	Action / Martial arts	
Perfect Life				
Plastic City				
Playboy Cops	Jingle Ma	Shawn Yue, Chen Kun, Linda Chung		
Rule No. 1	Kelvin Tong	Shawn Yue, Ekin Cheng, Stephanie Che, Fiona Xie	Horror	
Run Papa Run	Sylvia Chang	Louis Koo, Rene Liu	Comedy/Drama	
Scare 2 Die!				
See You in You Tube	Oxide Pang	Elanne Kwong, Janice Man	Comedy	
Shamo	Soi Cheang	Shawn Yue, Francis Ng		
Sparrow	Johnnie To	Simon Yam, Kelly Lin	Drama	
Tactical Unit - The Code	Law Wing-Cheong	Simon Yam, Maggie Shiu, Lam Suet	Action	Television-movie; Part of the Tactical Unit series.
Tactical Unit - Human Nature	Andy Ng	Simon Yam, Maggie Shiu, Lam Suet, Gordon Lam, Berg Ng	Action	
Tactical Unit - No Way Out	Lawrence Lau	Simon Yam, Maggie Shiu, Lam Suet	Action	
Tactical Unit - Partners	Lawrence Lau	Simon Yam, Maggie Shiu, Lam Suet	Action	
Three Kingdoms: Resurrection of the Dragon	Daniel Lee	Andy Lau, Sammo Hung, Maggie Q	Historical drama / martial arts	
True Women For Sale	Herman Yau	Prudence Liew, Anthony Wong Chau Sang, Sammy Leung, Race Wong	Drama	
The Seserted Inn				
The Vampire Who Admires Me	Wong Jing	Samuel Pang, Roger Kwok, JJ Jia, Maggie Li, Natalie Meng Yao, Ankie Beilke, Winnie Leung, Tanya Ng	Horror	
Wushu	Antony Szeto	Sammo Hung	Martial arts	
Yes, I Can See Dead People	David Lee	Steven Cheung		
