= Hong Kong Film Award for Best Supporting Actor =

Annual Chinese film award

- Awarded for: Performance by an actor in a supporting role
- Country: Hong Kong
- Presented by: Hong Kong Film Awards
- First award: 1985
- Currently held by: Chu Pak Hong — The Last Dance (2025)

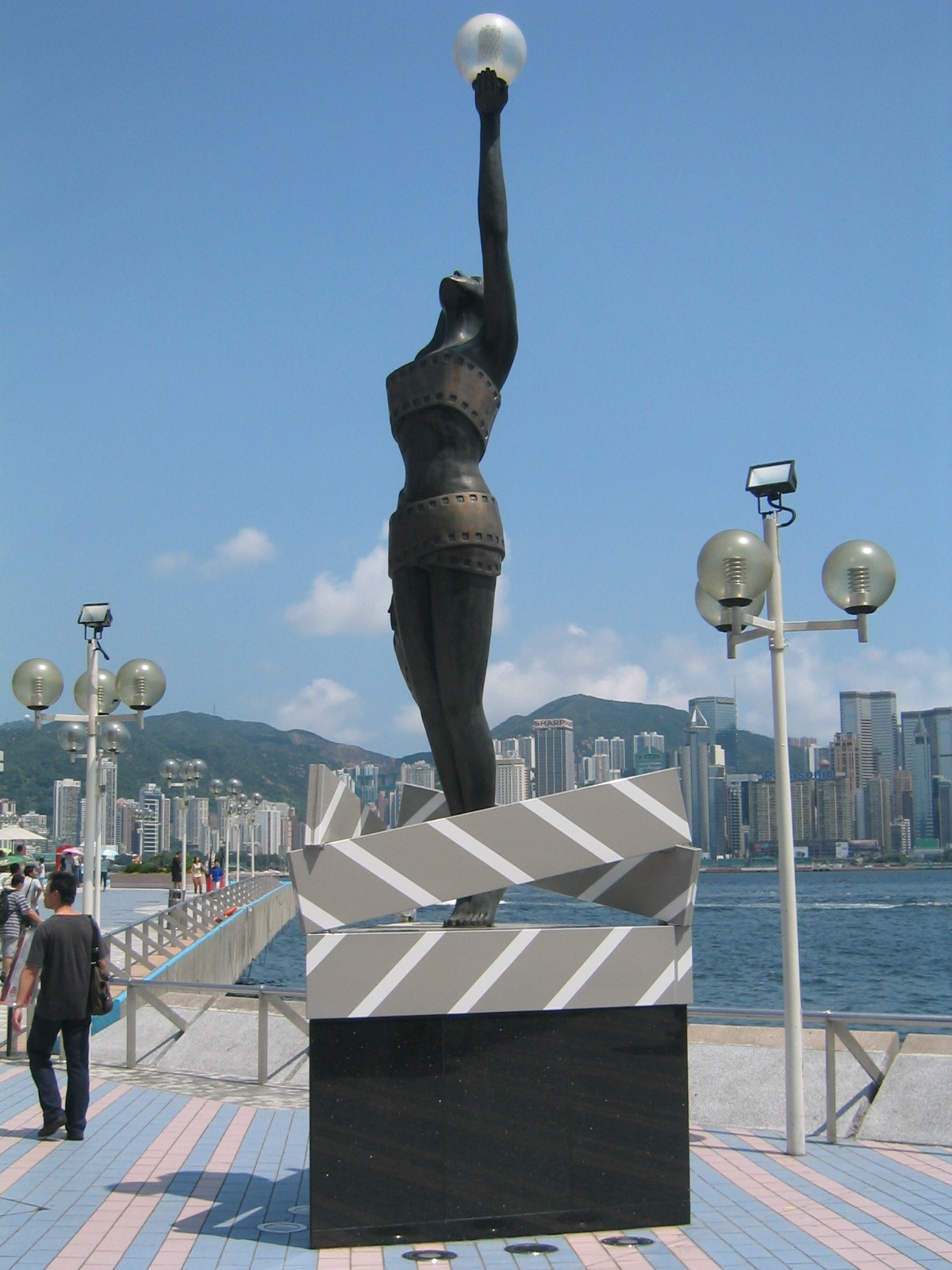
An upscale statue of the Award on The Avenue of Stars at Tsim Sha Tsui, Hong Kong

The Hong Kong Film Award for Best Supporting Actor is an annual Hong Kong industry award presented to an actor for the best performance by an actor in a supporting role.

== History ==
The award was established at the 4th Hong Kong Film Awards (1985) and the first winner was Shum Wai for his role in the film Long Arm of the Law. There are typically 5 or 6 nominations for the category of Best Supporting Actor from which one actor is chosen the winner of the Hong Kong Film Award for Best Supporting Actor.

The actors with most awards in this category are Tony Leung Chiu-wai, Paul Chun, Anthony Wong, Liu Kai-chi, and Eric Tsang with 2 times each. Tony Leung Chiu-wai also holds the record for the actor with the most awards in the Best Actor category.

== Winners and nominees ==
Year	Actor	Film	Character name	Note
1985 (4th)	Shum Wai	Long Arm of the Law		
1985 (4th)	Chor Yuen	Cherie		
1985 (4th)	Tai Bo	Law with Two Phases		
1985 (4th)	Chang Kuo-chu	An Amorous Woman of Tang Dynasty		
1985 (4th)	Anthony Chan	Behind the Yellow Line		
1986 (5th)	Mang Hoi	Yes, Madam		
1986 (5th)	Clarence Fok	Let's Make Laugh 2		
1986 (5th)	Lam Ching-ying	Mr. Vampire		
1986 (5th)	Billy Lau	Mr. Vampire		
1987 (6th)	Paul Chun	The Lunatics		
1987 (6th)	Waise Lee	A Better Tomorrow		
1987 (6th)	Wu Ma	Righting Wrongs		
1987 (6th)	Paul Chun	Peking Opera Blues		
1987 (6th)	Chow Yun-fat	Love Unto Waste		
1987 (6th)	Shing Fui-On	The Law Enforcer		
1988 (7th)	Tony Leung Chiu-wai	People's Hero		
1988 (7th)	Wu Ma	A Chinese Ghost Story		
1988 (7th)	Roy Cheung	Prison on Fire		
1988 (7th)	Ho Ka-kui	Prison on Fire		
1988 (7th)	Tsui Hark	Final Victory		
1988 (7th)	Ronald Wong	People's Hero		
1989 (8th)	Jacky Cheung	As Tears Go By		
1989 (8th)	Stephen Chow	Final Justice		
1989 (8th)	Alex Man	As Tears Go By		
1989 (8th)	Eric Tsang	The Other Half and the Other Half		
1989 (8th)	Wu Ma	Last Eunuch in China		
1990 (9th)	Tony Leung Chiu-wai	My Heart Is That Eternal Rose		
1990 (9th)	Paul Chu	The Killer		
1990 (9th)	Shing Fui-On	Stars & Roses		
1990 (9th)	Wong Kwan-Yuen	All About Ah-Long		
1991 (10th)	Ng Man-tat	A Moment of Romance		
1991 (10th)	Jacky Cheung	A Chinese Ghost Story II		
1991 (10th)	Jacky Cheung	The Swordsman		
1991 (10th)	Lau Shun	The Swordsman		
1991 (10th)	Ng Man-tat	All for the Winner		
1991 (10th)	Derek Yee	Kawashima Yoshiko		
1992 (11th)	Kwan Hoi-San	Lee Rock		
1992 (11th)	Jacky Cheung	Once Upon a Time in China		
1992 (11th)	Aaron Kwok	Saviour of the Soul		
1992 (11th)	Ng Man-tat	Fight Back to School		
1992 (11th)	Kent Tong	The Tigers		
1993 (12th)	Liu Kai-chi	Cageman		
1993 (12th)	Tony Leung Chiu-wai	Hard Boiled		
1993 (12th)	Francis Ng	Handsome Siblings		
1993 (12th)	Anthony Wong	Now You See Love, Now You Don't		
1993 (12th)	Donnie Yen	Once Upon a Time in China II		
1994 (13th)	Paul Chun	C'est la vie, mon chéri		
1994 (13th)	Kent Cheng	Crime Story		
1994 (13th)	Lawrence Cheng	Tom, Dick and Hairy		
1994 (13th)	Tsui Kam-Kong	All Men Are Brothers: Blood of the Leopard		
1994 (13th)	Michael Lee	Temptation of a Monk		
1994 (13th)	Anthony Wong	Legal Innocence		
1995 (14th)	Jordan Chan	Twenty Something		
1995 (14th)	Power Chan	The Final Option		
1995 (14th)	Jordan Chan	He's a Woman, She's a Man		
1995 (14th)	Eric Kot	In Between		
1995 (14th)	Law Kar-ying	From Beijing with Love		
1996 (15th)	Law Kar-ying	Summer Snow		
1996 (15th)	Chin Kar-lok	Full Throttle		
1996 (15th)	Jordan Chan	Heaven Can't Wait		
1996 (15th)	Eric Kot	Love in the Time of Twilight		
1996 (15th)	Dayo Wong	The Day that Doesn't Exist		
1997 (16th)	Eric Tsang	Comrades: Almost a Love Story		
1997 (16th)	Jordan Chan	Big Bullet		
1997 (16th)	Jerry Lamb	The Log		
1997 (16th)	Tsui Kam-Kong	Viva Erotica		
1997 (16th)	Anthony Wong	Young and Dangerous 3		
1997 (16th)	Simon Yam	To Be No. 1		
1998 (17th)	Jiang Wen	The Soong Sisters		
1998 (17th)	Chang Chen	Happy Together		
1998 (17th)	Law Kar-ying	Kitchen		
1998 (17th)	Eric Tsang	Task Force		
1998 (17th)	Poon Chang-Leung	The Mad Phoenix		
1999 (18th)	Patrick Tam	Beast Cops		
1999 (18th)	Nick Cheung	The Conman		
1999 (18th)	Alex Fong	Your Place or Mine!		
1999 (18th)	Sam Lee	The Longest Summer		
1999 (18th)	Eric Tsang	Hold You Tight		
2000 (19th)	Ti Lung	The Kid		
2000 (19th)	Hui Siu-Hung	Running Out of Time		
2000 (19th)	Lam Suet	The Mission		
2000 (19th)	Lo Bei	Little Cheung		
2000 (19th)	Tse Kwan-Ho	Ordinary Heroes		
2001 (20th)	Francis Ng	2000 A.D.		
2001 (20th)	Eason Chan	Lavender		
2001 (20th)	Chang Chen	Crouching Tiger, Hidden Dragon		
2001 (20th)	Roy Cheung	Jiang hu: The Triad Zone		
2001 (20th)	Simon Yam	Juliet in Love		
2002 (21st)	Wong Yat-fei	Shaolin Soccer		
2002 (21st)	Gordon Lam	Dance of a Dream		
2002 (21st)	David Lee	From the Queen to the Chief Executive		
2002 (21st)	Patrick Tam Kar-Ming	Born Wild		
2002 (21st)	Simon Yam	Midnight Fly		
2003 (22nd)	Anthony Wong	Infernal Affairs		
2003 (22nd)	Anthony Wong	Just One Look		
2003 (22nd)	Anthony Wong	Princess D		
2003 (22nd)	Chapman To	Infernal Affairs		
2003 (22nd)	Eric Tsang	Infernal Affairs		
2004 (23rd)	Tony Leung Ka-fai	Men Suddenly in Black		
2004 (23rd)	Eddie Cheung	Running on Karma		
2004 (23rd)	Ronald Cheng	My Lucky Star		
2004 (23rd)	Liu Kai-chi	Infernal Affairs II		
2004 (23rd)	Chapman To	Infernal Affairs II		
2005 (24th)	Yuen Wah	Kung Fu Hustle		
2005 (24th)	Daniel Wu	New Police Story		
2005 (24th)	Danny Chan Kwok Kwan	Kung Fu Hustle		
2005 (24th)	Jim Chim	Driving Miss Wealthy		
2005 (24th)	Tony Leung Ka-fai	Dumplings: Three...Extremes		
2006 (25th)	Anthony Wong	Initial D		
2006 (25th)	Alex Fong	Drink-Drank-Drunk		
2006 (25th)	Wong Tin-lam	Election		
2006 (25th)	Hu Jun	Everlasting Regret		
2006 (25th)	Liu Kai-chi	SPL: Sha Po Lang		
2007 (26th)	Ian Gouw	After This Our Exile		
2007 (26th)	Nick Cheung	Election 2		
2007 (26th)	Simon Yam	Election 2		
2007 (26th)	Jay Chou	Curse of the Golden Flower		
2007 (26th)	Liu Ye	Curse of the Golden Flower		
2008 (27th)	Andy Lau	Protégé		
2008 (27th)	Nick Cheung	Exodus		
2008 (27th)	Ronald Cheng	Mr. Cinema		
2008 (27th)	Chow Yun-fat	The Postmodern Life of My Aunt		
2008 (27th)	Louis Koo	Protégé		
2009 (28th)	Liu Kai-chi	Beast Stalker		
2009 (28th)	Stephen Chow	CJ7		
2009 (28th)	Zhang Fengyi	Red Cliff		
2009 (28th)	Gordon Lam	Ip Man		
2009 (28th)	Louis Fan	Ip Man		
2010 (29th)	Nicholas Tse	Bodyguards and Assassins		
2010 (29th)	Tony Leung Ka-fai	Bodyguards and Assassins		
2010 (29th)	Chang Chen	Red Cliff II		
2010 (29th)	Feng Tsui Fan	Accident		
2010 (29th)	Alex Fong	Overheard		
2011 (30th)	Teddy Robin	Gallants		
2011 (30th)	Tony Leung Ka-fai	Detective Dee and the Mystery of the Phantom Flame		
2011 (30th)	Deng Chao	Detective Dee and the Mystery of the Phantom Flame		
2011 (30th)	Wang Xueqi	Reign Of Assassins		
2011 (30th)	Liu Kai-chi	The Stool Pigeon		
2012 (31st)	Lo Hoi Pang	Life Without Principle		
2012 (31st)	Jimmy Wang	Wu Xia		
2012 (31st)	Paul Chun	A Simple Life		
2012 (31st)	Nicholas Tse	Shaolin		
2012 (31st)	Kenneth Tsang	Overheard 2		
2013 (32nd)	Ronald Cheng	Vulgaria		
2013 (32nd)	Liu Kai-chi	The Bullet Vanishes		
2013 (32nd)	Lam Ka Tung	Cold War		
2013 (32nd)	Chapman To	Diva		
2013 (32nd)	Alex Man	The Bounty		
2014 (33rd)	Zhang Jin	The Grandmaster		
2014 (33rd)	Tong Dawei	American Dreams In China		
2014 (33rd)	Huang Bo	Journey to the West: Conquering the Demons		
2014 (33rd)	Eddie Peng	Unbeatable		
2014 (33rd)	Anthony Chan	Rigor Mortis		
2015 (34th)	Kenneth Tsang	Overheard 3		
2015 (34th)	Alex Fong	Overheard 3		
2015 (34th)	Ng Man-tat	Aberdeen		
2015 (34th)	Lam Suet	The Midnight After		
2015 (34th)	Wang Baoqiang	Kung Fu Jungle		
2016 (35th)	Michael Ning	Port of Call		
2016 (35th)	Andrew Lam	Full Strike		
2016 (35th)	Louis Cheung	Keeper Of Darkness		
2016 (35th)	Zhang Jin	SPL II: A Time For Consequences		
2016 (35th)	Zhang Jin	Ip Man 3		
2017 (36th)	Eric Tsang	Mad World		
2017 (36th)	Paul Chun	Book of Love		
2017 (36th)	Ng Man-tat	The Menu		
2017 (36th)	Philip Keung	Trivisa		
2017 (36th)	Liu Kai-chi	Weeds on Fire		
2018 (37th)	Philip Keung	Shock Wave		
2018 (37th)	Philip Keung	Concerto Of The Bully		
2018 (37th)	Yasuaki Kurata	The Empty Hands		
2018 (37th)	Paul Chun	Love Off the Cuff		
2018 (37th)	Lam Ka Tung	Paradox		
2018 (37th)	Yasuaki Kurata	God of War		
2019 (38th)	Ben Yuen	Tracey		
2019 (38th)	Kenny Wong	Men On The Dragon		
2019 (38th)	Poon Chan Leung	Men On The Dragon		
2019 (38th)	Sam Lee	Still Human		
2019 (38th)	Liu Kai-chi	Project Gutenberg		
2020 (39th)	Cheung Tat-ming	I'm Livin' It		
2020 (39th)	Philip Keung	A Witness Out of the Blue		
2020 (39th)	Siuyea Lo	Suk Suk		
2020 (39th)	Alex Man	I'm Livin' It		
2020 (39th)	Zhang Qi	The New King of Comedy		
2022 (40th)	Mason Fung	Zero to Hero		
2022 (40th)	Louis Koo	Anita		
2022 (40th)	Lam Suet	Time		
2022 (40th)	Will Or	Drifting		
2022 (40th)	Tse Kwan-ho	Drifting		
2023 (41st)	Michael Hui	Where the Wind Blows		
2023 (41st)	Jan Lamb	The Sparring Partner		
2023 (41st)	Law Wing-cheung	Mama's Affair		
2023 (41st)	Louis Cheung	Table for Six		
2023 (41st)	Peter Chan	Table for Six		
2024 (42nd)	David Chiang	In Broad Daylight		
2024 (42nd)	Sean Wong	Time Still Turns the Pages		
2024 (42nd)	Jiro Lee	Over My Dead Body		
2024 (42nd)	Wu Kang-ren	Fly Me to the Moon		
2024 (42nd)	Tse Kwan-ho	A Guilty Conscience		
2025 (43rd)	Chu Pak Hong	The Last Dance		
2025 (43rd)	Louis Koo	Twilight of the Warriors: Walled In		
2025 (43rd)	Philip Ng	Twilight of the Warriors: Walled In		
2025 (43rd)	Siuyea Lo	Montages of a Modern Motherhood		
2025 (43rd)	Paul Chun	The Last Dance		

== Multiple wins and nominations ==
=== Multiple wins ===
Wins	Actor
2
2	Tony Leung Chiu-wai
2	Paul Chun
2	Anthony Wong
2	Liu Kai-chi
2	Eric Tsang

=== Multiple nominations ===
Nominations	Actor
8	Liu Kai-chi
7	Anthony Wong
7	Paul Chun
6	Eric Tsang
5	Ng Man-tat
4	Jacky Cheung
4	Jordan Chan
4	Alex Fong
4	Simon Yam
4	Tony Leung Ka-fai
4	Philip Keung
4	Lam Ka Tung
3	Wu Ma
3	Tony Leung Chiu-wai
3	Alex Man
3	Law Kar-ying
3	Chang Chen
3	Nick Cheung
3	Lam Suet
3	Louis Koo
3	Chapman To
3	Ronald Cheng
3	Zhang Jin
3	Tse Kwan-ho

== Records ==
Items	Name	Statistics	Notes
Most wins	Tony Leung Chiu-wai, Paul Chun, Anthony Wong, Liu Kai-chi, and Eric Tsang	2 wins	
Most nominations	Liu Kai-chi	8 nominations	2 wins
Oldest winner	Michael Hui	Age 80 years, 225 days	For Where the Wind Blows
Oldest nominee	Michael Hui	Age 80 years, 159 days	For Where the Wind Blows
Youngest winner	Ian Gouw	Age 10 years, 6 days	For After This Our Exile
Youngest nominee	Ian Gouw	Age 9 years, 298 days	For After This Our Exile
Most nominations without a win	Simon Yam, Alex Fong and Lam Ka Tung	4 nominations	

== See also ==
- Hong Kong Film Award
- Hong Kong Film Award for Best Actor
- Hong Kong Film Award for Best Actress
- Hong Kong Film Award for Best Supporting Actress
- Hong Kong Film Award for Best Action Choreography
- Hong Kong Film Award for Best Cinematography
- Hong Kong Film Award for Best Director
- Hong Kong Film Award for Best Film
- Hong Kong Film Award for Best New Performer
