= The Trier of Fact =

Upcoming Hong Kong film by Tong Wai-hon

- Teaser film poster
- Traditional Chinese: 守闕者
- Simplified Chinese: 守阙者
- Hanyu Pinyin: Shǒu Quē Zhě
- Jyutping: Sau2 Kyut3 Ze2
- Directed by: Tong Wai-hon
- Produced by: Benny Chan
- Starring: Louis Koo; Eddie Peng; Philip Keung
- Production companies: One Cool Film Production; Alibaba Pictures
- Distributed by: One Cool Pictures
- Country: Hong Kong
- Language: Cantonese

The Trier of Fact is an upcoming Hong Kong action film directed by Tong Wai-hon and starring Louis Koo, Eddie Peng and Philip Keung. The film tells the story of two police officers who bond together despite their opposing methods, but their different approaches to law enforcement eventually leads to a showdown between the two.

The film went into pre-production in 2019. After several years of delay, production for the film began on 9 August 2023.

== Plot ==
Police inspector Ben Kwok is assigned to investigate and collect evidence against the Narcotics Bureau inspector Car Che, who's suspected of working with the triads. However, during his task, Ben bonds with Car while working together and sharing the same beliefs in justice. On the surface, it appears that Car used criminals to bring down a drug kingpin, but Ben discovers that Car actually used the drug sweep operation to save his mentor from being blackmailed. Even though Car's actions were done to protect the entire Hong Kong Police Force, Ben must also stay true upholding the law and justice. This leads to a showdown between these two men and their different methods of justice.

== Cast ==
- Louis Koo as Car Che (車正光), an inspector of the Narcotics Bureau who uses unconventional methods.
- Eddie Peng as Ben Kwok (郭偉霆), a by-the-books police inspector.
- Philip Keung as Che's informant.
- Bowie Lam
- Amy Lo
- Ken Law
- Raymond Lam
- Kent Cheng
- Chrissie Chau
- Michael Wong
- Raymond Wong
- Sammo Hung
- Tony Wu
- Ansonbean

== Production ==
The film was first announced at the 2019 Hong Kong Film & TV Market (FILMART) in March 2019, where it was reported that film was in pre-production and was set to star Louis Koo and Nick Cheung, with Benny Chan producing and Tong Wai-hon making his directorial debut, while it is backed by Koo's production company, One Cool Pictures. However, production for the film was postponed due to the COVID-19 pandemic and Chan's death in 2020, and Tong would later go on to be make his directorial debut in 2022 in the film Bursting Point, in which he co-directed with Dante Lam.

Principal photography for The Trier of Fact began on 9 August 2023, where a production commencement ceremony was held attended by director Tong and cast members Koo, Eddie Peng, Philip Keung, Bowie Lam, Amy Lo and Ken Law. Additional cast members who will also be appearing in the film include Raymond Lam, Kent Cheng, Chrissie Chau, Michael Wong, Raymond Wong, Sammo Hung, Tony Wu and Ansonbean. Koo revealed he will be playing a policeman who is constantly on the border of morality while Peng's character who will in many scenes involving science. Keung reveals he will be playing an informant to Koo's character while Lo states this is her time portraying a police officer and underwent physical training to build muscle and endurance required for the role Because the late Chan played a heavy role in supervising the film during its development stage, he will still be credited as producer for the film.
