= Philip Keung =

Hong Kong actor and film producer

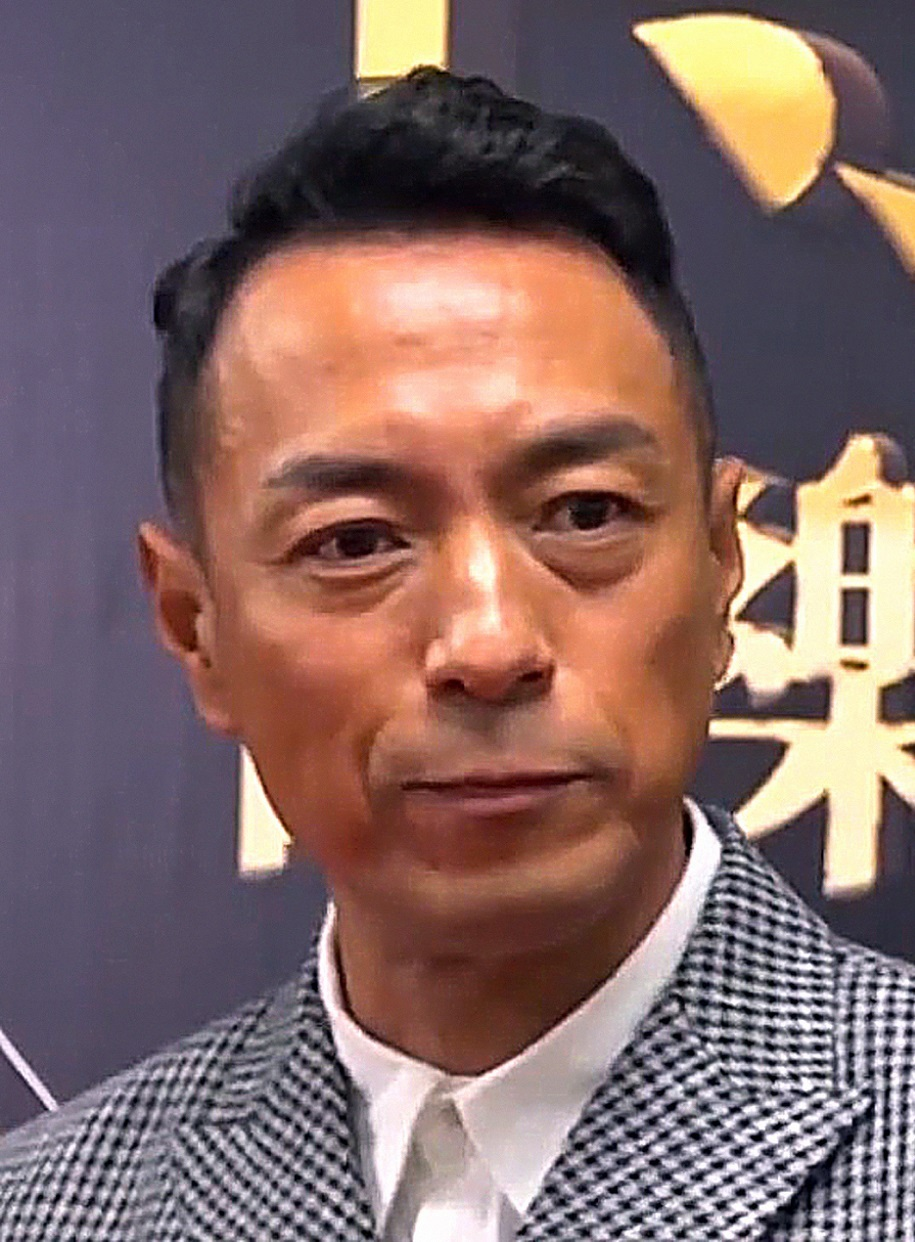
- Keung in 2020
- Born: 26 October 1966 (age 59); Hong Kong
- Occupations: Actor; film producer
- Years active: 1985—present
- Agent: One Cool Artist Management
- Spouse: Anna Kam (m. 1999)
- Awards: Profima International Film Fest & Awards – Best Supporting Actor; 2017 Shock Wave Hong Kong Film Awards – Best Supporting Actor; 2018 Shock Wave

Chinese name
- Traditional Chinese: 姜皓文
- Simplified Chinese: 姜皓文
Transcriptions
Standard Mandarin
- Hanyu Pinyin: Jiāng Hào Wén
Yue: Cantonese
- Jyutping: Geong1 Hou6 Man4

Philip Keung Ho-man (Chinese: 姜皓文; born 26 October 1966) is a Hong Kong actor and film producer. Keung began his acting career as a television actor in 1985 for Asia Television (ATV), and also began appearing in films from 1988. He eventually left ATV in 2010 and became a full-time film actor while occasionally acting in television series from time to time. In 2017, Keung was nominated for the Hong Kong Film Award for Best Supporting Actor for his performance in the 2016 film Trivisa, and in the following year, Keung won the award for his performance in the 2017 film Shock Wave.

== Early life ==
Keung is the oldest son in his family, being the elder brother of two younger sisters and a younger brother. His father was already separated from his mother before he was born and thus, he has never met his father. Keung's mother was later remarried to a Chung (鍾) surnamed decorator contractor. Because his mother suffered from illness and his adopted father was busy with work at the same time, his younger siblings were sent to a children's home. When Keung was 14 years old, his mother died from her illness and he was sent to the Holland Hostel operated by the Hong Kong Student Aid Society in Kwun Tong. Keung had previously attended many primary schools, ranging from North Point to Kwun Tong. Later, he was enrolled in the Delia Memorial School (Yuet Wah).

== Career ==
While attending secondary school, Keung starting working in a number of odd jobs such as a dim sum waiter at the China Restaurant, a decorator and an acrobat performer. He later became an extra actor since his girlfriend at that time worked in an extra actors' agency. In 1986, Keung signed up for Asia Television's (ATV) first Mr. Television Competition (電視先生選舉), where he won second place as well as the title of "Mr. Talent" (才華先生) and subsequently became a contracted artiste for ATV.

Keung received praises for his satirical portrayal of LegCo member Leung Kwok-hung in ATV's political parody program, Hong Kong Gossip. However, since the audience viewership for ATV has been low, most local audiences only began noticing him after he left ATV in 2010 and began appearing in high-profile films such as Beast Stalker (2008), The Stool Pigeon (2010) and Life Without Principle (2011), for which he was nominated for the Chinese Film Media Awards for Best Supporting Actor.

In recent years, Keung has become one of Hong Kong's most prolific film actors, appearing in over 40 films between 2013 and 2018, playing major supporting roles in many high-profile films such as Firestorm, Unbeatable, Little Big Master, Two Thumbs Up and Trivisa, for which he was nominated for the Hong Kong Film Award for Best Supporting Actor and Hong Kong Film Critics Society Award for Best Actor.

In 2017, Keung won the Best Supporting Actor Award at the 1st Profima International Film Fest & Awards in Malaysia for his performance in the action film Shock Wave, which was his first acting award in his career. At the 37th Hong Kong Film Awards, Keung was once again awarded Best Supporting Actor for his role in Shock Wave, while being nominated in the same category for his performance in the film Concerto of the Bully.

Keung landed the leading role in two films, Tracey and Remember What I Forgot, which were promoted at the 2018 Hong Kong International Film & TV Market (FILMART), which ran from 19 to 22 March 2018. In the former, Keung played a 51-year-old married man and father whose craving for feminization increases, while he played a Hong Kong film fanatic who suffers from brain degeneration in the latter.

In 2019, Keung starred in the TVB drama The Defected as "Bingo", for which he was placed in top five nominations for Best Actor at the 2019 TVB Anniversary Awards. In 2021, he starred in the TVB drama Murder Diary as the Superintendent of Police "Nip Shan", who suffered from Bipolar Disorder after his wife's disappearance. Being invited by Hana Kuk, Keung filmed his first MV for "Trust Nobody", the ending theme of Murder Diary.

== Personal life ==
In 1999, Keung married former ATV actress, Anna Kam (殷寧). His wife is known as Kappy King. She competed in the Miss ATV Pageant and was voted as Miss Congeniality.

== Filmography ==
=== Films ===
Year	Title	Chinese title	Role	Notes/Ref.
1988	The Good, the Bad & the Beauty	鬼馬保鏢賊美人	"Doctor"	
1990	Sunshine Friends	笑星撞地球	Actor	
1991	The Plot	佈局	Actor	
1991	Pretty Woman	卿本佳人	"Hwang Shun-chin"	
1992	Angel Terminators		"Drug dealer"	
1992	Inspector Wears Skirts IV	'92霸王花與霸王花	"Judy's husband"	
1993	Two of a Kind	情人知己	"Darkie"	
1993	Flirting Scholar		"One of 4 Pervert Heroes"	
1993	The Formula	黃鶯大戰阿拉丁	Actor	
1993	The Heroic Trio		"Baby Killer"	
1993	Malevolent Male	人肉天婦羅	"Detective Blackie"	
1993	My Pale Lover	情難自制	"Kam Sing"	
1993	China Girls	中港儷人	Actor	
1993	Obsession	妒火焚情	Actor	
1993	Even Mountains Meet	情天霹靂之下集大結局	Actor	
1994	Best of Best	摩登龍爭虎鬥	"Pub waiter"	
1995	The Day that Doesn't Exist	二月三十	"Mr. Chan"	
1995	Once in a Life-Time	終身大事	"Stentor"	
1996	Muto Bontie	摩登菩呢提	"Killer with smiling face"	
1996	The King of Robbery	悍匪	"Ke"	
1998	Best of Friend	難姐難妹	Actor	
1998	Second Honeymoon	第二次蜜月旅行	Actor	
1998	A Hero Never Dies		Actor	
1998	Beauty of the Haunted House	凶宅胭脂	"Mr. Taro"	
1999	Made About You	千禧金瓶梅之我為嫂狂	"Dude Ying"	
1999	Garden of Lust	千禧金瓶梅之片片淫花開	"Dude Ying"	
1999	Double Exposure	千禧金瓶梅之天地淫絕豔雙娃	"Dude Ying"	
1999	Dick's Dicks Dicks	千禧金瓶梅之迷姦武二郎	"Dude Ying"	
1999	A Touch of Desire	千禧金瓶梅之淫奴李瓶兒	"Dude Ying"	
1999	Knock Out, Simon	千禧金瓶梅之西門慶慾火焚身	"Dude Ying"	
1999	Mythical Peach Blossoms	香帥傳奇之桃花傳奇	Actor	
1999	Sexual Harmony	香帥傳奇之美艷殺手一點紅	Actor	
1999	Lunge Party	香帥傳奇之我和疆屍有個約會	Actor	
1999	Honey Moon	蜜月殺機	Actor	
1999	Devil Flesh	千禧金瓶梅之風騷孽后趙春梅	"Dude Ying"	
1999	Mayflower Sweetheart	千禧金瓶梅之性娃伍月娘	"Dude Ying"	
1999	Rookie Baby	千禧金瓶梅之情逗李師師	"Dude Ying"	
1999	Filthy, Filthy Bandits	千禧金瓶梅之淫聲浪語蕩梁山	"Dude Ying"	
1999	Tsimshatsui Floating Corpse	驚幻奇案：尖東浮屍	Actor	
1999	Hyu Seng Fung Wong	驚幻奇案之血腥鳳凰	Actor	
1999	Afraid of Nothing, the Jobless King		"Darkie"	
1999	Battle of Love	玉蒲團四之雲雨山莊	Actor	
1999	Empress Wu	唐朝禁宮秘史	"Monk Huaiyi (Feng Xiaobao)"	
1999	Son of Flirtation	玉蒲團之淫行無道	"Holy Spirit"	
1999	The Karma of Sex	玉蒲團之極樂寶鑑	"Holy Spirit"	
1999	Secret Dalliance	玉蒲團之淫行天下	"Holy Spirit"	
1999	Jade Stalk	玉蒲團之陽物性教	"Holy Spirit"	
2000	Tale of Two Dragons	轟天雙龍會	Actor	
2000	Guys and a Cop	賤男特警	"Balls"	
2000	The Blood Rules	行規	"Fat Chiu"	
2000	An Eye of an Eye	以眼還眼	"Carmen's ex-husband"	
2000	The Temptation of Office Ladies	OL誘惑之各自各精彩	"Michael Wong"	
2000	It's a Mad, Mad, Mad, Mad Kung Fu World!!!	大踢爆	Himself	
2000	Those Were the Days...		"Fook"	
2001	Jyut Kei	絕機	Actor	
2001	Crime of a Beast	終極強姦獸性誘惑	"Mandy"	
2001	Crazy for Pig-Bone in Pot	情迷豬骨煲	"Mr. Ma"	
2001	City of Desire	慾望之城	"Brother Kong"	
2001	A Gambler's Story	一個爛賭的傳說	"Brother Face"	
2002	Fatal Comic	一本未完的漫畫	"Ying Chi-kin"; Producer	
2002	Hot & Spicy	麻辣神探	"Mochito"; Producer	
2002	Conman 2002	賭俠2002	"Brother 9"	
2002	Fox Ghost	聊齋誌異之孽慾孤鬼	"Falun the Monk"	
2002	Snake Charmer	焚獸之都	"Di"	
2002	The Peeping	偷窺無罪	Actor	
2002	Devil Face, Angel Heart		"Dragon"	
2002	A Wicked Ghost III: The Possession		"Wong Chou-shui"	
2003	The Undercover Madams	人間鍊獄之淫間道	Actor	
2003	Tortured Sex Goddess of Ming Dynasty	極樂酷刑	Actor	
2003	Mansion Murder	甘田一豪宅謀殺案	Actor	
2003	Sexual Exchange	向左搞向右搞	Actor	
2003	Enjokosai Angel	援交天使	Actor	
2003	My Secret Private Virgin	私家秘密處女	Actor	
2003	To Seduce an Enemy	誘人犯罪	"Private Detective Wu"	
2003	The Professional	全職妓女	"Man"	
2003	Zero	一切由零開始	"Director"	
2003	The Invincible	拳王	"Wong Siu-fu"; Producer	
2003	Raped by an Angel 5	強姦5之廣告誘惑	Actor	
2004	Dragon in Fury	霍元甲之精武真英雄	Actor	
2004	Five Tigers	新東成西就	"Ouyang Feng"	
2004	Fairy Legend	仙魔遊蹤之百懂仙	Actor	
2004	The Kingdom of Darkness	仙魔遊蹤	Actor	
2004	Sex and the Beauties	性感都市	"Wing" / "Vincent Savage"	
2005	Flame of Desire	禁室軀殼	Actor	
2005	Kung Fu Mahjong 2		"Demon"	
2005	The Impotent King	新傾國傾城	"Wah On-an"	
2006	My Wife Can Fight	絕世好妻	Actor	
2008	Beast Stalker		"Cheung Yat-tung"	
2009	Kung Fu Chefs		"M.C."	
2010	Fire of Conscience		"Captain Chung"	
2010	The Stool Pigeon		"Tai Ping"	
2010	The Haunting Lover	等著你回來	Dr. Tony Lam	
2011	Life Without Principle		"Law Siu-lung" / "Pop-Eyed Dragon"	Nominated: Chinese Film Media Awards for Best Supporting Actor
2011	Mysterious Island		"Jordan Chen"	
2012	The Viral Factor		"Russell"	
2012	Natural Born Lovers	天生愛情狂	"Robber"	
2013	Firestorm		"Tong Keung"	
2013	Blind Detective		"Chan Kwong"	
2013	Unbeatable		"Tai-sui"	
2013	Drug War		"Darkie"	
2013	The Twins' Code	孿生密碼	Actor	
2013	SDU: Sex Duties Unit		"A-Team leader Joe"	
2014	From Vegas to Macau		Ma Sheung-fat	
2014	Delete My Love		"Blackie"	
2014	Z Storm		"Ho Tak-wing"	
2014	That Demon Within		"Station sergeant"	
2014	Gangster Payday		"Bill"	
2014	Golden Brother		"Thief"	
2014	The Seventh Lie	第7謊言	"Officer Lau"	
2014	Sifu Vs. Vampire	天師鬥殭屍	"Keung Senior"	
2014	Fight for Glory (榮譽至上)		Actor	
2014	Just Another Margin		"Chef"	
2015	S for Sex, S for Secret		"Ben"	
2015	From Vegas to Macau II		"Ma Tai-fat"	
2015	12 Golden Ducks		"Hak"	
2015	Little Big Master		"Lo Keung"	
2015	Two Thumbs Up		"Chief of robbers"	
2015	Full Strike		"Brother Crazy Dog"	
2015	Wild City		"Kuen"	
2015	Imprisoned: Survival Guide for Rich and Prodigal		"Wolfy"	
2015	Keeper of Darkness		"Kwan"	
2015	SPL II: A Time for Consequences		"Fan King-hung"	
2015	Helios		"Wong Kin-chung"	
2016	Trivisa		"Fai"	Nominated: Hong Kong Film Award for Best Supporting Actor; Nominated: Hong Kong Film Critics Society Award for Best Actor
2016	Call of Heroes		"Lee Tit-ngau"	
2016	The Mobfathers		"Luke"	
2016	Robbery (老笠)		"Yan"	
2016	From Vegas to Macau III		"Ma Tai-fat"	
2016	S Storm		"Bill Tang"	
2016	Time Raiders		"Tai-fui"	
2016	Heartfall Arises		"Cheuk Na-lung"	
2016	Sky on Fire		"Wai-wai"	
2017	Shock Wave		"Kong Yiu-wai"	Won: Profima International Film Fest & Awards for Best Supporting Actor; Won: Hong Kong Film Award for Best Supporting Actor
2017	Chasing the Dragon		"Wil"	
2017	Adieu (告別之前)		Actor	
2018	A Beautiful Moment (我的情敵女婿)		"Lau Hak-keung"	
2018	Concerto of the Bully (大樂師:為愛配樂)		"Triad"	Nominated: Hong Kong Film Award for Best Supporting Actor
2018	Shun Pong O		Actor	
2018	Master Z: Ip Man Legacy		Officer Fai	
2018	Tracey		"Travis Tung" / "Tracey"	Nominated: Hong Kong Film Award for Best Actor
2019	A Witness Out of the Blue		"Yip Sau-ching"	
2019	Sheep Without a Shepherd		"Dutpon"	
2020	Shock Wave 2		"Lee Yiu-sing"	
2020	The Calling of a Bus Driver (阿索的故事)		"Manfred Lee"	
2020	Knockout		"Kinson"	
2021	Dynasty Warriors		"Zhang Jue"	
2021	All U Need Is Love		"Guest at Grande Hotel"	
2021	Warriors of Future		Actor	
2021	Once Upon a Time in Hong Kong		Actor	
2021	The Case Death Drugs (重案行動之搗毒任務)		Actor	
2023	Bursting Point		"Lin Jiu"	
2023	The Goldfinger		Actor	
2023	Death Notice			
2024	Crisis Negotiators		Lee Chi Bun	
2026	Kong Tao (蠱降)			
TBA	Remember What I Forgot (電影痴漢)		"Film Fanatic"	
TBA	Shadows (殘影空間)		Actor	

=== Television dramas ===
Year	Title	Chinese title	Role	Notes	Ref.
1985	Ji Gong	濟公	Actor		
1985	The S.I.B. Files	大班密令	Actor		
1986	The Boy Fighter from Heaven	哪吒	"Horse Face"		
1987	Genghis Khan		"Bo'orchu"		
1987	The Rise and Fall of Qing Dynasty		"Kam Fung-chi"		
1988	Tai Wan Kwun	大宦官	Actor		
1988	Li Qingzhao	李清照	Actor		
1988	Hung Ling	凶靈	Actor		
1988	Hak Yeh	黑夜	"Lam Yat-ming"		
1989	The Legend of Fu Hung-suet	傅紅雪傳奇	Actor		
1989	Ye Lau Lei	夜琉璃	Actor		
1989	City Swordsman	城市劍客	"Cho Sing"		
1989	Police Archives	皇家檔案	"Kwok Wai-hing"		
1989	Police Archives III	皇家檔案III	"Danny"		
1989	Happy Together	代代平安	Actor		
1990	The Real Pals	難兄難弟	Lee Lin-kit		
1990	Heaven's Retribution	還看今朝	Actor		
1990	I Am Tuna Fi	我係Tuna Fi	"Ho Koon-chau"		
1991	Central Sandwichman	中環英雄	Actor		
1992	Hoi Sam Kwai Fuk Sing	開心鬼福星	Actor		
1993	Police Story	皇家警察實錄	Actor		
1994	Heroic Legend of the Yang's Family		"Mang Ting-kwok"		
1994	The Great General		"Mang Ting-kwok"		
1995	Fist of Fury		"Chung"		
1995	Vampire Expert		"Lee Sei-wai"		
1995	Secret Battle of the Majesty	王奪位	"Yuntang"		
1995	Justice Pao	包青天	"Luen Tung" / "Tsu Heung-tung" / "Tit Ngau"		
1996	King of Gambler	千王之王重出江湖	"Chan Sing-hak"		
1996	Who Is the Killer	誰是兇手	"Lam Wing-fai"		
1996	Vampire Expert II	殭屍道長II	"Chow Sam-yuen"		
1996	The Truth	真相	"Yuen Kwok-wai"		
1996	The Folk Tales	坊間傳奇	Actor		
1997	Fated Love	天長地久	"Fu Sau-ying"		
1997	The Years of Chameleon	97變色龍	"Brother Tse"		
1997	The Pride of Chaozhou		Actor		
1997	My Brother, My Mum	屋企有個肥大佬	"Chu Man-on"		
1998	My Date with a Vampire		"Ko Po"		
1999	Ten Tigers of Guangdong		"Tam Chai-kwan"		
2000	My Date with a Vampire II		"Chu Wing-fuk"		
2000	Showbiz Tycoon		"Master Lau"		
2000	A Dream Named Desire	美麗傳說	"Lo Yam-chung"		
2001	The Poet Su Dong Po	騷東坡	"Sap Fong"		
2001	To Where He Belongs	縱橫天下	"Boss Hung"		
2005	Danger Counter	危險人物	"Mad B"		
2005	The Great Adventure	大冒險家	"Cheung Hung"		
2005	Happy Family	喜有此理	Actor		
2006	Hong Kong Criminal Files	香港奇案實錄	"Man Nang"		
2006	Relentless Justice	義無反顧	Actor		
2006	Tales of Walled Village	大城小故事	"Seung Po"		
2007	Hong Kong Ghostbusters	靈舍不同	"Blackie"		
2007	Ma Jong Gathering (十六不搭喜趣來)		"Chan Fat-yeung"		
2008	Flaming Butterfly		"Seung Yeung"		
2010	Hong Kong Go Go Go (香港GoGoGo)		"HO Hak-tan"		
2010	The Men of Justice		"Ng Hing-lung"		
2012	Strangers 6		"Yau Yan"		
2014	The Borderline		"Tse Tai-hak"		
2015	Beyond the Rainbow		"Luk Ho-cheung"		
2015	Doom+5		"Law Tai-wai"		
2015	Hidden Faces		"Ma Sai-kwong"		
2015	Nigh Shift		"Ho Sai-ming"		
2016	Infernal Affairs (無間道)		"Prince"		
2018	Guardian Angel 2018 Web Drama		"Thin Ribs" (排骨細)	Guest appearance in ep. 3-5	
2019	The Defected		"Bingo Yau Bing-ko"	Nominated - TVB Anniversary Award for Best Actor (Top 5)	
2020	Line Walker: Bull Fight		"Bingo Yau Bing-ko"	Guest appearance in ep. 37	
2021	Murder Diary		"Nip Shan"	Nominated - TVB Anniversary Award for Best Actor; Nominated – TVB Anniversary Award for Most Popular Male Character (Top 10); Nominated - TVB Anniversary Award for Most Popular Onscreen Partnership (shared with Kara Wai); Nominated — TVB Anniversary Award for Favourite TVB Actor in Malaysia	
2021	Forever Young At Heart (青春本我)		"Gigi's father"	Guest appearance	
2023	A Perfect Gentleman (極度俏郎君)		"Yi Scar" (一疤)	ViuTV series, main role	

=== Music video appearances ===
Year	Title
2016	Ken Hung - "Pain"
2021	Jason Chan - "對得起自己"
2022	Jason Chan - "One Day"
