= 28th Hong Kong Film Awards =

2009 Hong Kong Film Awards

- Date: 19 April 2009
- Site: Hong Kong Cultural Centre
- Hosted by: Eric Tsang, Teresa Mo, Sandra Ng, Vincent Kok, Kay Tse, Denise Ho, Lam Chi Chung, Chin Kar-lok, Louis Fan, Tin Kai Man, Michelle Lo, Wong Cho Lam

The 28th Hong Kong Film Awards ceremony was held on 19 April 2009 in the Hong Kong Cultural Centre and hosted by Eric Tsang, Teresa Mo, Sandra Ng, Vincent Kok, Kay Tse, Denise Ho, Lam Chi Chung, Chin Kar-lok, Louis Fan, Tin Kai Man, Michelle Lo and Wong Cho Lam.

== Awards ==
Winners are listed first, highlighted in boldface, and indicated with a double dagger (‡).

**Best Film**: **Ip Man**‡; The Way We Are; Red Cliff; CJ7; Painted Skin	**Best Director**: **Ann Hui — The Way We Are**‡; Johnnie To — Sparrow; John Woo — Red Cliff; Benny Chan — Connected; Wilson Yip — Ip Man
**Best Screenplay**: **Lou Shiu-Wa — The Way We Are**‡; Susan Chan, Sylvia Chang and Mathias Woo — Run Papa Run; Gordon Chan, Lau Ho-Leung and Abe Kwong — Painted Skin; Jack Ng & Dante Lam — The Beast Stalker; Ivy Ho — Claustrophobia	**Best Actor**: **Nick Cheung — The Beast Stalker**‡; Louis Koo — Run Papa Run; Simon Yam — Sparrow; Tony Leung — Red Cliff; Donnie Yen — Ip Man
**Best Actress**: **Nina Paw — The Way We Are**‡; Prudence Liew — True Women For Sale; Barbie Shu — Connected; Zhou Xun — Painted Skin; Karena Lam — Claustrophobia	**Best Supporting Actor**: **Liu Kai-Chi — The Beast Stalker**‡; Zhang Fengyi — Red Cliff; Stephen Chow — CJ7; Gordon Lam — Ip Man; Louis Fan — Ip Man
**Best Supporting Actress**: **Chan Lai-Wun — The Way We Are**‡; Nora Miao — Run Papa Run; Zhao Wei — Red Cliff; Race Wong — True Women For Sale; Sun Li — Painted Skin	**Best New Performer**: **Xu Jiao — CJ7**‡; Monica Mok — Ocean Flame; Kitty Zhang — All About Women; Jun Leung — The Way We Are; Lin Chi-ling — Red Cliff
**Best Cinematography**: **Arthur Wong — Painted Skin**‡; Tony Cheung — Three Kingdoms: Resurrection of the Dragon; Cheng Siu-Keung — Sparrow; Lü Yue and Zhang Li — Red Cliff; O Sing Pui — Ip Man	**Best Film Editing**: **Yau Chi-Wai — Connected**‡; David Richardson — Sparrow; Angie Lam, Robert A. Ferretti and Yang Hong-Yu — Red Cliff; Chan Ki-Hop — The Beast Stalker; Cheung Ka-Fai — Ip Man
**Best Art Direction**: **Tim Yip — Red Cliff**‡; Daniel Lee and Horace Ma — Three Kingdoms: Resurrection of the Dragon; Kenneth Yee and Ben Lau — An Empress and the Warriors; Bill Lui and Liu Jingping — Painted Skin; Kenneth Mak — Ip Man	**Best Costume Make Up Design**: **Tim Yip — Red Cliff**‡; Thomas Chong and Wong Ming-Na — Three Kingdoms: Resurrection of the Dragon; William Chang — All About Women; Kenneth Yee and Dora Ng — An Empress and the Warriors; Ng Po-Ling — Painted Skin
**Best Action Choreography**: **Sammo Hung and Tony Leung Siu-Hung — Ip Man**‡; Sammo Hung and Yuen Tak — Three Kingdoms: Resurrection of the Dragon; Corey Yuen — Red Cliff; Nicky Li — Connected; Stephen Tung — Painted Skin	**Best Original Film Score**: **Taro Iwashiro — Red Cliff**‡; Henry Lai Wan-man — Three Kingdoms: Resurrection of the Dragon; Xavier Jamaux and Fred Avril — Sparrow; Ikurō Fujiwara — Painted Skin; Kenji Kawai — Ip Man
**Best Original Film Song**: **Painted Heart — Painted Skin**‡; Composer: Ikurō Fujiwara; Lyricist: Keith Chan; Singer: Jane Zhang; Flying with Dreams — An Empress and the Warriors; Composer: Mark Lui; Lyricist: Lin Xi; Singers: Kelly Chen and Leon Lai; Breaking Up is Ruthless — L For Love, L For Lies; Composer: Andrew Chu; Lyricist: Fang Jie; Singer: Kary Ng; Xin·Zhan ~RED CLIFF~ — Red Cliff; Composer: Taro Iwashiro; Lyricist: Francis Lee; Singer: alan; Eternal Love — Missing; Composer: Kerman; Lyricist: Ant Rice Factory; Singers: Angelica Lee and Dilnur	**Best Sound Design**: **Wu Jiang and Roger Savage — Red Cliff**‡; Chris Goodes and Sam Wong — Connected; Kinson Tsang and Lai Chi-Hung — Painted Skin; Phyllis Cheng, Nip Kei-Wing and David Wong — The Beast Stalker; Kinson Tsang — Ip Man
**Best Visual Effects**: **Craig Hayes — Red Cliff**‡; Eddy Wong, Victor Wong and Ken Law — CJ7; Ho Siu-Lun — Missing; Ng Yuen-Fai, Chas Chau and Tam Kai-Kwan — Painted Skin; Henri Wong — Ip Man	**Best New Director**: **Derek Kwok — The Moss**‡; Heiward Mak — High Noon; Ivy Ho — Claustrophobia
**Best Asian Film**: **Assembly (China)**‡; If You Are the One (China); Cape No. 7 (Taiwan); Suspect X (Japan); Forever Enthralled (China)	**Professional Achievement**: **Ding Yue**‡
**Lifetime Achievement**: **Josephine Siao**‡
