= Jack Ng =

Hong Kong filmmaker (born 1975/1976)

- 吳煒倫
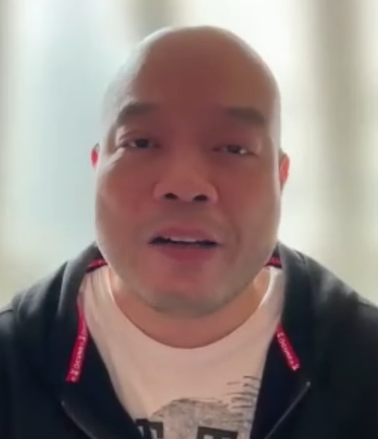
- Ng in March 2026
- Born: Ng Wai-lun; 1975 or 1976 (age 50–51); Hong Kong
- Education: Hong Kong Academy for Performing Arts (BFA)
- Occupations: Director; Screenwriter
- Years active: 2001–present

Jack Ng Wai-lun (Chinese: 吳煒倫; born 1975/1976) is a Hong Kong film director and screenwriter. Starting his career as a screenwriter, Ng is best known for collaborating with Dante Lam in action thriller films. He received four nominations for Best Screenplay in the 28th, 30th, 33rd, and 36th Hong Kong Film Awards for his contributions to Beast Stalker (2008), The Stool Pigeon (2010), Unbeatable (2013), and Cold War 2 (2016) respectively.

Ng made his directorial debut with the crime comedy film A Guilty Conscience (2023). The film earned him nominations for Best Director in the 42nd Hong Kong Film Awards and Best Directorial Debut in the 36th Golden Rooster Awards, and made him the first director to produce a Hong Kong domestic film with over HK$100 million of box office.

== Early life and education ==
Ng was born in 1975 or 1976. He attended St Joseph's College, and graduated from the Hong Kong Academy of Performing Arts in 2000 with a Bachelor of Fine Arts in Film and Television, majoring in directing.

== Career ==
After completing his studies, he entered the film industry as a script supervisor, which included working on Dante Lam's 2000 crime comedy film Jiang hu: The Triad Zone. Ng befriended Lam and went on to collaborate as a screenwriter in his subsequent projects Hit Team and Runaway in 2001. Ng continued to write for Lam in the 2003 comedy horror film The Twins Effect and served as the writer for the 2005 action thriller film SPL: Sha Po Lang. In 2008, Ng once again collaborated with Lam, writing the screenplay for the action thriller film Beast Stalker, which garnered him a nomination for Best Screenplay in the 28th Hong Kong Film Awards. He earned another nomination for Best Screenplay in the 30th Hong Kong Film Awards for the 2010 action thriller film The Stool Pigeon, also directed by Lam.

Ng continued to collaborate with Lam as a screenwriter in several films. In 2012, he worked on Lam's action film The Viral Factor and the 2013 sports film Unbeatable. His screenplay for The Viral Factor earned him a nomination for Best Screenplay at the 19th Hong Kong Film Critics Society Award, while he received nominations for Best Screenplay in both the 20th Hong Kong Film Critics Society Award and the 33rd Hong Kong Film Awards for his work on Unbeatable. In 2015, Ng wrote the screenplay for the action thriller film That Demon Within, for which Ng was nominated for Best Screenplay in the 21st Hong Kong Film Critics Society Award. In 2017, he collaborated with directors Longman Leung and Sunny Luk on the action thriller film Cold War 2, earning another nomination for Best Screenplay in the 36th Hong Kong Film Awards. He then co-wrote Monster Hunt 2 with his fellow APA classmate Sunny Chan in 2018, and contributed as a screenwriter for the biographical film Anita in 2021.

In 2023, Ng made his directorial debut with the film A Guilty Conscience. The film received critical acclaim and became the highest-grossing domestic film in Hong Kong, making Ng the first director to achieve a box office record of over HK$100 million for a local film. His directorial debut also earned him a nomination for Best Director in the 42nd Hong Kong Film Awards and Best Directorial Debut in the 36th Golden Rooster Awards.

== Filmography ==
=== Film ===
Year	Title	Writer	Director	Ref.
2001	Hit Team	Yes	No	
2001	Runaway	Yes	No	
2003	The Twins Effect	Yes	No	
2004	Love Battlefield	Yes	No	
2005	SPL: Sha Po Lang	Yes	No	
2008	Beast Stalker	Yes	No	
2009	The Sniper	Yes	No	
2010	The Stool Pigeon	Yes	No	
2010	Fire of Conscience	Yes	No	
2012	The Viral Factor	Yes	No	
2013	Unbeatable	Yes	No	
2014	That Demon Within	Yes	No	
2016	Cold War 2	Yes	No	
2018	Monster Hunt 2	Yes	No	
2021	Anita	Yes	No	
2023	A Guilty Conscience	Yes	Yes	
2026	Night King	Yes	Yes	

== Awards and nominations ==
Year	Award	Category	Work	Result	Ref.
2009	28th Hong Kong Film Awards	Best Screenplay	Beast Stalker	Nominated	
2011	30th Hong Kong Film Awards	Best Screenplay	The Stool Pigeon	Nominated	
2013	19th Hong Kong Film Critics Society Award	Best Screenplay	The Viral Factor	Nominated	
2014	20th Hong Kong Film Critics Society Award	Best Screenplay	Unbeatable	Nominated	
2014	33rd Hong Kong Film Awards	Best Screenplay	Unbeatable	Nominated	
2015	21st Hong Kong Film Critics Society Award	Best Screenplay	That Demon Within	Nominated	
2017	36th Hong Kong Film Awards	Best Screenplay	Cold War 2	Nominated	
2023	36th Golden Rooster Awards	Best Directorial Debut	A Guilty Conscience	Nominated	
2023	36th Golden Rooster Awards	Best Writing	A Guilty Conscience	Nominated	
2024	42nd Hong Kong Film Awards	Best Director	A Guilty Conscience	Nominated	
2024	42nd Hong Kong Film Awards	Best Screenplay	A Guilty Conscience	Nominated	
2024	42nd Hong Kong Film Awards	Best New Director	A Guilty Conscience	Nominated	
