= Henry Lai Wan-man =

Chinese film composer

Henry Lai Wan-man 黎允文
- Origin: Hong Kong
- Genres: New-age
- Occupations: Composer, musician
- Instrument: Guitar
- Formerly of: Island
- Awards: Best Music – Changchun Film Festival; 2016 To the Fore

Henry Lai Wan-man (Chinese: 黎允文) is a Chinese film composer based in Hong Kong who created the original score for more than 50 films.

== Education ==
Henry Lai finished his high school in Pui Ching Middle School (Hong Kong) and Repton School (Derbyshire, UK). He acquired his degree in architecture at the University of Hong Kong.

== Career ==
Lai started his music career in a band, but it was disbanded. Lai also joined "Island", a band which he wrote original songs. Lai plays a classical guitar. In 1994, Lai started scoring music for films. Lai has composed music for film directors such as Daniel Lee, Mabel Cheung, and Dante Lam.

== Filmography ==
- The Kung Fu Scholar (1993)
- Thanks for Your Love (1996)
- Moonlight Express (1999)
- A Fighter's Blues (2000)
- Beijing Rocks (2001)
- Just One Look (2002)
- Traces of a Dragon (2003)
- Star Runner (2003)
- Tom Clancy's Ghost Recon 2 (2004) Video Game PS2/GameCube
- Dragon Squad (2005)
- B420 (2005)
- My Name Is Fame (2006)
- Beast Stalker (2008)
- The Sniper (2009)
- Three Kingdoms: Resurrection of the Dragon (2009)
- Black Ransom (2010)
- 14 Blades (2010)
- Echoes of the Rainbow (2010)
- Fire of Conscience (2010)
- The Stool Pigeon (2010)
- The Lost Bladesman (2011)
- White Vengeance (2011)
- The Four (2012)
- The Stolen Years (2013)
- Unbeatable (2013)
- Balala the Fairies: The Magic Trial (2014)
- Old Boys: The Way of the Dragon (2014)
- A Tale of Three Cities (2015)
- To the Fore (2015)
- Dragon Blade (2015)
- Yesterday Once More (2016)
- Kill Time (2016)
- Time Raiders (2016)
- Operation Mekong (2016)
- The Climbers (2019)
- Matteo Ricci The Musical (2019)- music composer.

== Awards and nominations ==
Year	#	Award	Category	Work	Result
2002	21st	Hong Kong Film Awards	Best Original Film Song	Beijing Rocks	Nominated
2002	21st	Hong Kong Film Awards	Best Original Film Score	Beijing Rocks	Nominated
2009	28th	Hong Kong Film Awards	Best Original Film Score	Three Kingdoms: Resurrection of the Dragon	Nominated
2009	3rd	Asian Film Awards	Best Composer	Three Kingdoms: Resurrection of the Dragon	Nominated
2012	11th	Changchun Film Festival	Best Music	White Vengeance	Nominated
2012	31st	Hong Kong Film Awards	Best Original Film Score	White Vengeance	Nominated
2014	33rd	Hong Kong Film Awards	Best Original Film Score	Unbeatable	Nominated
2016	15th	Changchun Film Festival	Best Music	To the Fore	Won
