= Samuel Pang =

Hong Kong actor and dancer (born 1976)

- 彭敬慈
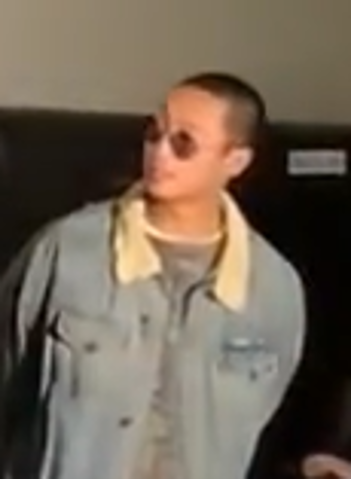
- Pang in November 2017
- Born: Pang King-chi; 30 December 1976 (age 49); Hong Kong
- Occupations: Actor; dancer
- Years active: 1996–present

Samuel Pang King-chi (Chinese: 彭敬慈; born 30 December 1976) is a Hong Kong actor and dancer. He began his career as a dancer in 1996 and was recruited as an apprentice of Anita Mui. He started acting in 2000, making his debut in Jiang hu: The Triad Zone (2000), and later starring in the films My School Mate, the Barbarian, Runaway (both 2001), Tactical Unit – Comrades in Arms, The Vampire Who Admires Me (both 2008), A Very Short Life (2009), and Justice in Northwest (2018), as well as the Netflix series OCTB (2017). He received his breakout role as Tiger Fong in the 2026 film Cold War 1994.

== Biography ==
Pang was born on 30 December 1976 in Hong Kong. (Note: Pang stated that his birthday coincides with the death anniversary of Anita Mui, who died on 30 December 2003, while according to Sing Tao Daily, Pang would turn 50 in 2026.) He has a younger sister. He began learning jazz and hip hop at age 16 while in secondary school, spending most of his time after school and on weekends practicing. He said that dancing was not considered a respectable profession at the time, though his parents were supportive of his passion. He began working as a professional dancer in 1996, performing as a backup dancer in concerts. While performing as a backup dancer for Andy Hui, an apprentice of Anita Mui, Pang performed a solo segment with Hui that impressed Mui, who felt he suited a segment she was conceptualizing for one of her concerts and invited him to dance in her show. Following the performance, Mui recruited Pang as her apprentice and encouraged him to pursue careers as both a singer and actor. Although Pang was interested in singing, he was initially skeptical about acting due to his lack of experience. Mui later recommended him to director Dante Lam, who cast him in his acting debut in the film Jiang hu: The Triad Zone as Tiger, a young gangster wannabe.

In 2001, Pang appeared in Wong Jing's school-themed comedy film My School Mate, the Barbarian, playing Mantis, the rival student of the character portrayed by Nicholas Tse, where film critic Sek Kei described him as "the film's most stylish performer". He also portrayed a gangster who flees to Phuket alongside the character played by Nick Cheung in Runaway, and appeared as a police officer in the action film Hit Team, where film critic Lau Man-gau praised his slight comedic touch. Pang later appeared in supporting roles in Heroic Duo, Explosive City, New Police Story, and Bet to Basic, before landing leading roles in another Wong Jing film My Wife Is a Gambling Maestro, the crime film Tactical Unit – Comrades in Arms, and the comedy film The Vampire Who Admires Me. On 2 January 2007, Pang was involved in a car crash on Kwai Chung Road and fled the scene before later reporting to a police station to assist with the investigation 18 hours later.

In 2009, Pang appeared in A Very Short Life as the boyfriend of the character played by Leila Tong, with James Mudge of EasternKicks describing his performance as "particularly loathsome". He also appeared in Black Ransom and The Assassins, before shifting part of his career to mainland China, where he played a main role in the Zhejiang Television series Fall in Love. He later starred in the Chinese films Justice in Northwest as a silent assassin, and Summer of Fire – Dragon & Tiger as an orphaned gangster. Pang also took on a main role as Pang, a police officer, in the Netflix series OCTB. In 2019, he starred in A City Called Macau, explaining that he accepted the role because he had frequently portrayed villains in the past and wanted to challenge himself with a more realistic film.

In 2024, Pang and Timmy Hung became embroiled in controversy after a video of them smoking inside a banquet hall was leaked online, drawing criticism from netizens for smoking indoors. In 2026, Pang appeared in the crime thriller film Cold War 1994 as Tiger Fong, an ex-gangster-turned-kidnapper, which gained public attention. Ho Tak of Harper's Bazaar wrote that "the most pleasantly surprising performance came from Samuel Pang, who has rarely appeared in Hong Kong films in recent years", describing him as "perfectly suited to the role"; while film critic Calvin Choi described him as "the person who left the deepest impression on [him]" in the film.

== Filmography ==
=== Film ===
Year	Title	Role	Notes/Ref.
2000	Jiang hu: The Triad Zone	Tiger (羅金虎)	
2001	My School Mate, the Barbarian	Mantis (螳螂)	
2001	Runaway	King (阿勁)	
2001	Hit Team	Sam	
2003	Heroic Duo	Chi (池)	
2004	Explosive City	Glen	
2004	New Police Story	Sam (杜偉民)	
2005	Divergence	So Fu-on (蘇富安)	
2005	Embrace Your Shadow	Fu (傅)	
2006	Bet to Basic	Morpheus (滅羅)	
2007	Eye in the Sky	Burglar	
2007	Invisible Target	O.D.	Cameo
2008	My Wife Is a Gambling Maestro	Henry	
2008	Tactical Unit: No Way Out	Roy (狗Roy)	
2008	Tactical Unit – Comrades in Arms	Roy (狗Roy)	
2008	The Vampire Who Admires Me	King (King少)	
2009	A Very Short Life	Jo (曹永強)	
2010	Black Ransom	Bill (標)	
2011	The Assassins	Cao Xiu	
2016	Fight in Causeway Bay 2	Sheng Fan (生番)	
2017	Trouble Makers	Scarface (刀疤臉)	
2018	Justice in Northwest	You Xiong (游雄)	
2018	Summer of Fire – Dragon & Tiger	Yau Yiu (丘耀)	
2019	A City Called Macau	Brother Wah (華仔)	
2026	Cold War 1994	Tiger Fong (方展強)	

=== Television ===
Year	Title	Role	Notes/Ref.
2013	Fall in Love	Pung Yingju (朴英俊)	Main role
2017	OCTB	Lau Chin-pang (劉振鵬)	Main role
