= Unbeatable (film) =

2013 Hong Kong-Chinese film by Dante Lam

- Film poster
- Directed by: Dante Lam
- Written by: Dante Lam; Jack Ng; Fung Chi-fung
- Produced by: Candy Leung
- Starring: Nick Cheung; Eddie Peng
- Cinematography: Kenny Tse
- Edited by: Azrael Chung
- Music by: Henry Lai Wan-man
- Production companies: Bona Film Group; Bona Entertainment; Film Fireworks
- Distributed by: Distribution Workshop (Hong Kong); Tianjin Bona Cultural Media (China)
- Release dates: June 18, 2013 (Shanghai International Film Festival); August 15, 2013 (Hong Kong); August 16, 2013 (China)
- Running time: 116 minutes (Hong Kong); 122 minutes (China)
- Countries: Hong Kong; China
- Languages: Cantonese; Mandarin
- Box office: US$25,816,154

Unbeatable (Chinese: 激戰) is a 2013 sports drama film directed by Dante Lam. A Hong Kong-Chinese co-production, the film had its premiere at the Shanghai International Film Festival on June 18, 2013.

== Plot ==
Ching Fai (Nick Cheung) is a former boxing champion who has struggled since his glory days, having gone to prison over involvement with the Triads due to financial problems and now working as a taxi driver. When Triad loan sharks torch his taxi and chase him down for money he owed, Fai decides to flee to Macau to avoid them.

In Macau, Fai accepts a job offer from an old friend to work as an assistant in a gym, while renting a room with a feisty young girl Peidan (Crystal Lee), who has been taking care of her psychologically unstable mother (Mei Ting) since her four-year-old son drowned and her husband left her for another woman. At the gym, Fai meets a young man, Lin Siqi (Eddie Peng) who wishes to learn Mixed Martial Arts in order to join an upcoming MMA tournament, the "Golden Rumble", which offers the winner millions of dollars - his motivation for doing so is to help out his father, a businessman who had recently lost a fortune due to a failed "flipping" deal, which has turned him into a depressed drunkard. Fai agrees.

Several months before the tournament, Fai has Lin follow a strict training regimen, and at the same time he develops a bond with Peidan and her mother. After the tournament begins, Lin struggles but is able to beat several opponents, making it into the semi-finals, impressing both Fai and Lin's father, but also gets the attention of the Triads. Later, while celebrating the Mid-Autumn Festival, loan sharks unexpectedly show up to attack Fai and Peidan's family. Fai fends them off, but Peidan is hurt in the process. As she is hospitalized, social services are also alerted to the fact that her mother is psychologically unfit to take care of a child. When she is told that Peidan's father is returning to take custody of Peidan, she violently assaults a social worker, immediately causing her to be placed into a mental hospital. At the same time, Lin faces his toughest opponent yet, and loses badly after his arm and neck are broken.

Believing that he has "done nothing" for twenty years, Fai decides to join the tournament himself and trains vigorously for it, and is selected to enter the finals. Peidan's father also comes to meet Fai, and although Fai feels indifferent towards him at first, the father tells him that Peidan has agreed to live with him, but only if Fai wins in the tournament. After a brutal fight watched by many, including Lin in the hospital, Fai ultimately emerges victorious (by taking advantage of his easily dislocated right shoulder), and Lin is so excited over the victory that he leaps out of his wheelchair, cured.

With his newly earned fortune, Fai pays off his loans and meets Peidan one last time, while also continuing to visit Peidan's mother. He later meets a now recovered Lin, and the two joke about the injuries that they have each endured in the ring.

== Cast ==
- Nick Cheung as Ching Fai
- Eddie Peng as Lin Siqi
- Crystal Lee as Liang Peidan
- Mei Ting as Wang Mingjun
- Philip Keung as Yeung Hin-sun
- Li Feier as Coco (only appears in China Mainland version)
- Jack Kao as Lin Yuanxiang
- Andy On as Li Zitian
- Will Liu as Rock Kong
- Liu Chunwei as young Ching Fai
- Michelle Lo as Sandy Lo
- Stephen Au as Master Kwan, Ching Fai's master
- Noel Leung as psychiatrist
- Wang Baoqiang as Boss Chan

== Production ==
An early candidate for the English-language title for the film was MMA. The film was written by Jack Ng, Dante Lam and Fung Chi-fung. Ng and Lam had previously worked together on The Viral Factor, The Stool Pigeon, and Fire of Conscience.

== Release ==
The film had premiered at the Shanghai International Film Festival on June 18, 2013. It was released in China on August 16, 2013.

== Reception ==
=== Critical response ===
Clarence Tsui of The Hollywood Reporter writes, "It’s this mix of tears and laughter amidst the blood, sweat and broken necks that makes Unbeatable an enjoyable vehicle."

Andrew Chan of the Film Critics Circle of Australia writes, "Unbeatable is one of those films that never stops to excite, entertain, inspire and finally understand. It is an accomplished effort from a director very much in his prime and also bringing a veteran actor to even greater heights."

Kevin Ma of LoveHKFilm states that "with a career-best performance by Nick Cheung, a script infused with great humor and MMA scenes that will please action fanboys, this sports drama is Dante Lam’s best film since The Beast Stalker and easily his most purely enjoyable to date. Unbeatable offers nothing new, but it’s solid genre entertainment." He informs audiences that "Unbeatable’s selling point is mixed martial arts, but it’s really a character-driven drama about three troubled souls in Macau," using the words "uplifting" and "inspiring" to describe the film.

=== Box office ===
By 1 September 2013, Unbeatable had earned over HK$32.5 million in the box office of Hong Kong. It was the highest-grossing film of the summer and also the highest grossing locally produced film of 2013. Lead actor Cheung Ka-Fai said he would appear in eight cinemas to thank the cinemagoers' support and drive the box office results further up. By the end of September 2013, the film had earned over HK$43 million.

=== Awards ===
33rd Hong Kong Film Awards
Nominee	Awards	Results
-	Best Film	Nominated
Dante Lam	Best Director	Nominated
Nick Cheung	Best Actor	Won
Eddie Peng	Best Supporting Actor	Nominated
Crystal Lee	Best Supporting Actress	Nominated
Dante Lam, Chi Fung Fung, Wai Lun Ng	Best Screenplay	Nominated
Kenny Tse	Best Cinematography	Nominated
Phyllis Cheng	Best Sound Design	Nominated
Wai Chiu Chung	Best Film Editing	Nominated
Henry Lai Wan-man	Best Original Film Score	Nominated
Chi Wah Ling	Best Action Choreography	Nominated
2014 Hong Kong Film Critics Society Awards
Nominee	Awards	Results
-	Film of Merit	Won
Nick Cheung	Best Actor	Won
16th Shanghai International Film Festival
Nominee	Awards	Results
Nick Cheung	Best Actor	Won
Crystal Lee	Best Actress	Won
50th Golden Horse Film Festival and Awards
Nominee	Awards	Results
Nick Cheung	Best Actor	Nominated
Eddie Peng	Best Supporting Actor	Nominated
Crystal Lee	Best Supporting Actress	Nominated
Phyllis Cheng	Best Sound Effects	Nominated
Azrael Chung	Best Editing	Nominated
Ling Chi-Wah	Best Action Choreography	Nominated
10th Huading Awards
Nominee	Awards	Results
Dante Lam	Best Chinese Director	Won
Nick Cheung	Best Chinese Film Actor	Won
