= Justice in Northwest =

- Traditional Chinese: 西北風雲
- Simplified Chinese: 西北风云
- Hanyu Pinyin: Xīběi Fēngyún
- Directed by: Huang Huang
- Written by: Huang Huang
- Produced by: Chen Jinhong; Xie Xin
- Starring: Yu Nan; Simon Yam
- Cinematography: Li Yaohui; Zheng Minqiang
- Edited by: Li Jun
- Music by: Huang Xiaoqiu
- Production companies: Huashi Youbang Film and Television Media Co,.LTD.
- Distributed by: Beijing Huanyang Media Co,.LTD. Beijing Xingmei Film and Television Distribution Co,.LTD. Chengdu Yingduoduo Culture Media Co,.LTD.
- Release date: 13 April 2018 (China)
- Running time: 96 minutes
- Country: China
- Language: Mandarin

Justice in Northwest (Chinese: 西北风云) is a 2018 Chinese crime film written and directed by Huang Huang and stars Yu Nan and Simon Yam. The film premiered in China on 13 April 2018. It follows the story of a female policewoman named Gao Qiao in the detection of a cross border smuggling case.

== Cast ==
- Yu Nan as Gao Qiao, a policewoman
- Simon Yam as Lu Hong, a former university chemistry professor
- Jack Kao as Lao Jiang
- Samuel Pang as You Xiong
- Xie Xintong as Xiao Bai
- Li Zhuoyuan as Huotou
- Yang Shuming as Zhou Xiang
- Yang Shao'ang as Da Chun
- Zhang Shaoxuan as Xiao Chun
- Wang Yanhui as You Yong
- Wang Xiaolong as Lai Ji
- Liu Wenhao as Waiter
- Chen Guanyu as Feng
- Lin Xiaofan as Sun Xiaohu
- Du Yuming as Drug dealer boss
- Lu Ling as Drug dealer OL

== Production ==
This film was shot in both cities of Lanzhou and Baiyin in northwest China's Gansu province.

== Release ==
The film premiered in China on April 13, 2018.

The film received mainly negative reviews.
