= Tiramisu (2002 film) =

2002 Hong Kong film by Dante Lam

- DVD cover
- Traditional Chinese: 戀愛行星
- Simplified Chinese: 恋爱行星
- Hanyu Pinyin: Liàn Ài Xíng Xīng
- Jyutping: Lyun2 Ngoi3 Hang4 Sing1
- Directed by: Dante Lam
- Screenplay by: Chan Man-yau; Ross Lee
- Story by: Dante Lam
- Produced by: Daniel Lam; Dante Lam
- Starring: Nicholas Tse; Karena Lam; Eason Chan; Candy Lo; Vincent Kok
- Cinematography: Chan Chi-ying
- Edited by: Chan Kei-hop
- Music by: Tommy Wai
- Production companies: Universe Entertainment; Films Station Production
- Distributed by: Universe Films Distribution
- Release date: 28 March 2002
- Running time: 111 minutes
- Country: Hong Kong
- Language: Cantonese
- Box office: HK$2,331,483

Tiramisu is a 2002 Hong Kong romantic fantasy film directed by Dante Lam. It stars Nicholas Tse and Karena Lam in their first film collaboration.

== Plot ==
A mail man (Nicholas Tse) delivers a package to Jane Chan (Karena Lam), a dancer. Jane dies. He meets Jane's ghost on a subway train and begins a romantic relationship.

== Cast ==
- Nicholas Tse as Ko Fung
- Karena Lam as Jane Chan (aka Chan Jing)
- Eason Chan as Buddy
- Candy Lo as Tina
- Vincent Kok as Lawrence
- Chan Kit-ling as Sue
- Kitty Yuen as Monica
- Lawrence Chou as Doctor
- Helen Ma as Ko Fung's mother
- Ng Siu-kong as Jane's father
- Ting Chu-wai as Jane's mother
- Lam Nag-man as Chan Wing
- Bobby as Bobby
- Lam Ching as Doctor's girlfriend
- Lung Yuen-lam as Dancing teacher
- Chiu Ho-yin as Jerry
- Lo Ka-yu as Lydia
- Dancers
  - Karen Chan
  - Ng Lai-hing
  - Chan Yuk-chu
  - Tam Kit-yu
  - Linda Choi
  - Tse Pui-kei
  - Chow Kam-yin
  - Wong Lai-hung
  - Lam San
  - Yip Wing-yan
  - Ma Cheung-ching
  - Yiu Wing-chi
  - Mai To
- Lee Kong as Old ghost husband
- Wei Wei as Old ghost wife
- Chow Yu-kei as Monica's boyfriend
- Jazz band members
  - Wong Wing-kei
  - Yuen Chan-ting
  - Chan Man-tin
  - Doddy P. Marcelo
  - Lee Tok-fai
  - Ha Sek-hang
- Siu Ping-lam as Newspaper editor
- Jackie Lam as Accident victim
- Ho Yung-mui as Minibus driver
- Benny Tse as Truck driver
- Wong Chui-yee as Convenience store clerk
- Preliminary's judges
  - Chan Chuen-mo
  - Leung Man-wai
  - Yau Kwok-hung
  - Chun Lam
  - Ng Yu-lit also as Final judge
- Howard G. Harris as Final judge
- Adelaide Chung as Final judge
- Lisa Marie Bell-Jones as Final judge
- John Nash as Final judge
- Poon Long-fong as Kid in convenience store
- Chan Chun-shan as Arrowed kid in convenience store
- Shek Cheuk-kan as Kid playing piano
- Lee Kin-shing as Pastor
- Wong Yu-mei as Waitress
- Man Kwai-pui as Waiter
- Woo Chi-ming as Waiter
- Sin Yan-kau as Waiter
- Wong Ming-yan as Cleaner
- Altan Au as Cleaner
- Chan Wing-yin as Cleaner
- Plato Lai as Cleaner
- Sam Ho-lin as Cleaner
- Couriers
  - Poon Yuk-sung
  - Chan Wing-hei
  - Chan Chi-san
  - Chik Chi-fung
  - Chan Wing-cheung
  - Tsang Hing-cheung
  - Chung Yung
