= Too Many Ways to Be No. 1 =

1997 Hong Kong film by Wai Ka-fai

- Theatrical poster
- Directed by: Wai Ka-Fai
- Written by: Wai Ka-fai; Szeto Kam-Yuen; Matt Chow
- Produced by: Johnnie To
- Starring: Lau Ching Wan; Carman Lee; Francis Ng; Cheung Tat-ming; Matt Chow; Elvis Tsui; Cheng Cho; Ruby Wong; Soong Pounh Chong
- Cinematography: Wong Wing Hang
- Edited by: Wong Wing Ming
- Music by: Wong Ka Sin
- Production company: Milkyway Image
- Distributed by: Golden Harvest
- Release date: 14 March 1997
- Running time: 90 minutes
- Country: Hong Kong
- Language: Cantonese

Too Many Ways to Be No. 1 (Chinese: 一個字頭的誕生) is a 1997 gangster drama directed by Wai Ka Fai, starring Lau Ching Wan, Carman Lee, Francis Ng, Cheung Tat Ming, Matt Chow, Elvis Tsui, Cheng Cho and Ruby Wong. Made in 1997, this is the first formal film produced by Milkyway Image.

== Synopsis ==
Bo invites Gau, a poor gangster living in Hong Kong, to join him in smuggling valuable cars back to China. What Gau doesn't know is that accepting the offer will lead him on a journey of endless misfortune and death in China. However, leaving the gang before they start their job will take him on another journey of fighting for dignity and honour in Taiwan.

== Cast ==
- Lau Ching Wan as A Gau (阿狗)
- Carman Lee
- Francis Ng as Matt (阿貓)
- Cheung Tat-ming as Bo (大寶)
- Matt Chow as Kei (喪基)
- Elvis Tsui
- Cheng Cho as Big Chun (大春)
- Ruby Wong as Bo's wife (大嫂)
- Soong Pounh Chong as Small Chun (小春)

== Awards ==
Too Many Ways to Be No. 1 was nominated for the Hong Kong Film Award for Best Screenplay award in the 17th Hong Kong Film Awards. It is also included in the Films of Merit list made by the Hong Kong Film Critics Society Award.

== See also ==
- Tarantinoesque film
