= Runaway (2001 film) =

2001 Hong Kong film by Dante Lam

- Film poster
- Traditional Chinese: 走投有路
- Simplified Chinese: 走投有路
- Hanyu Pinyin: Zǒu Tóu Yǒu Lù
- Jyutping: Zau2 Tau4 Yau5 Lou6
- Directed by: Dante Lam
- Written by: Jack Ng; Lau Ho-leung
- Produced by: Joseph Cheung; Dante Lam
- Starring: Nick Cheung; Anthony Wong; Samuel Pang; Ruby Wong; Ken Lo; Joe Lee; Anya Wu
- Cinematography: Chiu Foo-sam; Tony Cheung
- Edited by: Chan Kei-hop
- Music by: Tommy Wai
- Production companies: Universe Entertainment; Dream Work Production
- Distributed by: Universe Films Distribution
- Release date: 17 May 2001
- Running time: 99 minutes
- Country: Hong Kong
- Language: Cantonese
- Box office: HK$860,485

Runaway (Chinese: 走投有路) is a 2001 Hong Kong crime comedy film directed by Dante Lam and starring Nick Cheung, Anthony Wong, Samuel Pang, and Ruby Wong. It follows the antics of two inept triad bosses on the run following a series of mishaps.

== Plot ==
Dan (Nick Cheung) is a clever minded triad punk. One time on a run for fun, he plays a trick on a rival triad leader Ray (Anthony Wong), causing him to lose the opportunity of winning millions of dollars. Dan also embezzled cash from his gang and his boss, Kwan (Joe Lee) sends his henchmen to capture him. Dan escapes to Phuket Island, Thailand with his sworn brother, King (Samuel Pang), where they meet two attractive ladies. King falls in love with an innocent tattoo artist (Anya Wu), while Dan becomes entangled with the mysterious and unique Ching (Ruby Wong). At this time, Ray also arrives in Phuket in order to pursue his ideal girlfriend, Ching. Dan discovers Ching's ulterior to stay with Ray and comes in an agreement with Ching to seek benefits from Ray. At this point, Kwan's assassins also arrive in Phuket, ready to silence Dan and Ray.

== Cast ==
- Nick Cheung as Dan
- Anthony Wong as Ray
- Ruby Wong as Ching
- Samuel Pang as King
- Ken Lo as Tai
- Joe Lee as Boss Kwan
- Anya Wu as Tattoo girl / Assassin
- Sunny Luk as Dan's gangster
- Chan Kei-hop as Mr. Chan
- Chan Tsui-ting as Mao-mao
- Gary Mak as Brother Jiu
- Lau Ho-leung as Tour guide
- Vivian Wong as Reporter
- Tony Cheung as Chef
- Annie Wong as Tai's mother
