= Ruby Wong =

Hong Kong actress and model (born 1971)

- Born: 7 September 1971 (age 55); Hong Kong
- Occupations: Actress; model
- Years active: 1990s–2005

Chinese name
- Traditional Chinese: 黃卓玲
- Simplified Chinese: 黄卓玲
Transcriptions
Standard Mandarin
- Hanyu Pinyin: Huáng Zhuólíng
Yue: Cantonese
- Jyutping: Wong4 Zoek3-ling4

Ruby Wong Cheuk-ling (born 7 September 1971) is a Hong Kong actress and former model.

== Filmography ==
- Infernal Mission (2004)
- Looking for Mr. Perfect (2003)
- PTU (2003)
- Sai Kung Story (2003)
- U-Man (2002)
- Women from Mars (2002)
- Hit Team (2001)
- Loser's Club (2001)
- Runaway (2001)
- Running Out of Time 2 (2001)
- Double Tap (2000)
- Needing You... (2000)
- Play With Strangers (2000)
- Anna and the King (1999)
- Night Club (1999)
- Running Out of Time (1999)
- Where A Good Man Goes (1999)
- Expect the Unexpected (1998)
- Killing Me Tenderly (1997)
- Lifeline (1997)
- Tamagotchi (1997)
- Too Many Ways to Be No. 1 (1997)
- Loving You (1995)
- Thunder Cops II (1989)
