= The Stool Pigeon (2010 film) =

2010 Hong Kong-Chinese film by Dante Lam

- Chinese film poster for The Stool Pigeon
- Directed by: Dante Lam
- Written by: Jack Ng
- Story by: Dante Lam
- Produced by: Albert Lee; Wang Zhonglei; Cheung Hong-tat
- Starring: Nicholas Tse; Nick Cheung; Gwei Lun-mei; Liu Kai-chi; Miao Pu; Lu Yi
- Cinematography: Kenny Tse
- Edited by: Chan Ki-hop; Matthew Hui
- Music by: Henry Lai Wan-man
- Production companies: Emperor Motion Pictures; Huayi Brothers; Sil-Metropole Organisation
- Distributed by: Emperor Motion Pictures
- Release dates: August 24, 2010 (China); August 26, 2010 (Hong Kong)
- Running time: 112 minutes
- Countries: Hong Kong; China
- Language: Cantonese
- Box office: US$10 million

The Stool Pigeon (simplified Chinese: 线人; traditional Chinese: 綫人; pinyin: Xiàn Rén; Jyutping: Sin3 Jan4) is a 2010 action thriller film directed by Dante Lam and starring Nicholas Tse, Nick Cheung and Gwei Lun-mei. A Hong Kong-Chinese co-production, the film is about police detective, Don Lee (Cheung), who uses informants to gain information about gangsters. Lee begins to feel guilty when his informants are caught, but sends out a street racer named Ghost (Tse) as an informant to gain information about a gangster name Barbarian (Lu Yi).

The film was released in China on August 24 and two days later in Hong Kong. The film performed well in the Hong Kong box office, though it has received mixed reviews.

== Plot ==
Don Lee (Nick Cheung), a police detective in Kowloon whose reliance on informants leaves him struggling with a guilty conscience. Lee's previous stool pigeon's cover was blown and was attacked, leading him paranoid and driven from his wife and home. Lee begins to doubt his own methods. Lee recruits a street racer named Ghost (Nicholas Tse) as his latest stool pigeon who is assigned to infiltrate a gang led by the notorious armed robber Barbarian (Lu Yi). Ghost accepts Lee's offer so he can rescue his sister from a life of prostitution as well as help his father's one-million dollar debt. Ghost joins an illegal street race to gain acceptance into Barbarian's gang. Lee also has personal problems of his own, as wife Cher (Miao Pu) who he is separated with tried to commit suicide a few months previously and has since had amnesia. Lee begins to realize how wrong he is by exploiting his informants and desperately tries to right his wrongs before Ghost is in serious trouble.

== Cast ==
- Nicholas Tse as Ghost Jr.
- Gwei Lun-mei as Ah Di
- Nick Cheung as Inspector Don Lee
- Liu Kai-chi as Jabber
- Miao Pu as Cher, Don Lee's wife
- Lu Yi as Barbarian
- Philip Keung as Tai Ping, Barbarian's right-hand man
- Sherman Chung as Ghost's younger sister
- Lawrence Cheng as Cher's friend
- Deep Ng as Fairing
- Derek Kwok as Officer Ku, a detective in Don Lee's CIB team.
- Rob Lok as an Undercover CID Agent

== Production ==
Production on The Stool Pigeon began on November 2, 2009. Early during the production of the film, the Chinese film conglomerate Huayi Brothers signed on to take an equity stake and a production credit for the film. Despite having much of the same cast of his previous hit film Beast Stalker, Dante Lam said The Stool Pigeon is not a sequel. Dante stated that he "felt the pressure when I was working on the new movie because The Beast Stalker did so well and received a lot of positive feedback. I did not want the new film to live in its shadow because it is an entirely different movie, except with the same cast." Dante Lam chose the theme of an informant in the film, stating that there is "Hong Kong shoot-out film on this theme yet. It's a good subject for exploring human nature and I have done research with involved people in real life".

Actor Nick Cheung stated that he felt much more relaxed working on Stool Pigeon than he did previously on The Beast Stalker as he had worked with the cast before. Some reports noted that Cheung was unhappy that his screen time is shorter, Cheung denied this saying he was misquoted off his Twitter by the Hong Kong media and paparazzi.

== Release ==
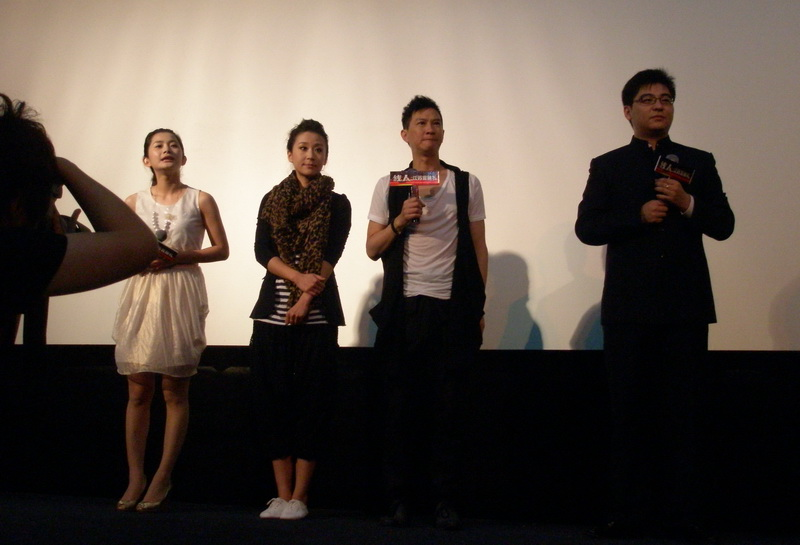
The Stool Pigeon premiere in Jiangsu.

The Stool Pigeon was released in China on August 24, 2010, and in Hong Kong on August 26. The film was shown in Japan at the Tokyo Filmex festival. The film premiered at number two in the Hong Kong box office where on its opening week. It was beaten by The Expendables. The next week it placed at number one on the chart. It has grossed a total of US$1,598,123.

== Reception ==
The China Post gave the film three stars out of five stating praising a car race scenes set to the song "White Christmas" while stating that the action scenes are thin. The China Post also noted that there were "a few unnecessary subplots" and that overall "the story is gripping and entertaining throughout." Film Business Asia gave the film a rating of eight out of ten also praised the "White Christmas" race scene. They compared the film to Beast Stalker, stating it was "less dark and claustrophobic than Stalker...But it's more deeply characterised from top to bottom, with much better chemistry between Tse and Cheung than between Leon Lai and Richie Ren in [Fire of Conscience]. Only the subplot of the detective's private life seems pasted into the overall drama." The Hollywood Reporter compared the film negatively to The Beast Stalker, stating that The Stool Pigeon "falls short in tension and stylistic brio if judged as a sister film...The narrative could benefit from more tautness. As if worried about the audience's attention span for drama, action scenes are intermittently inserted throughout but they don't build to one big momentum." Time Out Hong Kong gave the film three stars out of six, finding the film far too similar to Dante Lam's other works.

=== Accolades ===
Awards
Ceremony	Category	Name	Outcome
5th Asian Film Awards
5th Asian Film Awards	Best Cinematography	Kenny Tse	Nominated
30th Hong Kong Film Awards
30th Hong Kong Film Awards	Best Film	The Stool Pigeon	Nominated
30th Hong Kong Film Awards	Best Director	Dante Lam	Nominated
30th Hong Kong Film Awards	Best Screenplay	Jack Ng	Nominated
30th Hong Kong Film Awards	Best Actor	Nicholas Tse	Won
30th Hong Kong Film Awards	Best Actor	Nick Cheung	Nominated
30th Hong Kong Film Awards	Best Supporting Actor	Liu Kai-chi	Nominated
30th Hong Kong Film Awards	Best Film Editing	Matthew Hui, Chan Ki-hop	Nominated
30th Hong Kong Film Awards	Best Sound	Kinson Tsang	Nominated
17th Hong Kong Film Critics Society Awards
17th Hong Kong Film Critics Society Awards	Film of Merit	The Stool Pigeon	Won
