= Black Ransom =

2010 Hong Kong film by Wong Jing

- Film poster

Chinese name
- Traditional Chinese: 撕票風雲
- Simplified Chinese: 撕票风云
Transcriptions
Standard Mandarin
- Hanyu Pinyin: Sī Piào Fēng Yún
Yue: Cantonese
- Jyutping: Si1 Piu3 Fung1 Wan4
- Directed by: Wong Jing; Venus Keung
- Screenplay by: Wong Jing
- Produced by: Wong Jing
- Starring: Simon Yam; Michael Miu; Fala Chen
- Cinematography: Venus Keung; Ng King-man
- Edited by: Lee Ka-wing
- Music by: Henry Lai Wan-man
- Production company: Mega-Vision Pictures
- Distributed by: Mega-Vision Pictures
- Release date: 7 January 2010
- Running time: 93 minutes
- Country: Hong Kong
- Language: Cantonese
- Box office: US$339,557 (HK$1.89 million)

Black Ransom is a 2010 Hong Kong action thriller film directed by Wong Jing and Venus Keung and starring Simon Yam, Michael Miu and Fala Chen.

== Plot ==
Before his wife was murdered, Inspector Mann Cheung (Simon Yam) was a model to young detectives. However, with his wife's death, he was indulged in deep sorrow and became downhearted and dispirited. Not only was his detective image affected, his relationship with his daughter Yan (Wada Hiromi) also went downhill. The new superintendent Koo Kwok-keung (Fala Chen) assigned him to take charge of a series of kidnapping cases. Several triad leaders were kidnapped, held to ransom and murdered. The modus operandi was violent, brutal, professional and efficient. Mann soon discovers that the gang of kidnappers were former members of the Special Duties Unit, led by Sam Ho (Michael Miu) and his girlfriend, Can (Qu Ying), a former member of the VIP Protection Unit, who were familiar with the police modus operandi and were able to escape from apprehension. Sam also discovers that Mann is after him. A duel to the death between the two elites of the police force is ensued.

== Cast ==
- Simon Yam as Inspector Mann Cheung
- Michael Miu as Sam Ho
- Fala Chen as Superintendent Koo Kwok-keung
- Liu Yang as Eva
- Qu Ying as Can
- Kenny Wong as Ice King
- Wada Hiromi as Yan
- Vincent Wong as Spring
- Xing Yu as Rocky
- Andy On as Gundam Ko
- Jiang Yang as Eagle
- Samuel Pang as Bill
- Adam Chan as Hui
- Ricky Chan as Inspector Tiger Chan
- Parkman Wong as Tang Qing
- Zuki Lee as Tang Qing's wife
- Richard Cheung as Uncle Dragon
- Mark Cheung as Bull
- Wong Ching as Wide Mouth
- Winnie Leung as Mady
- Ben Cheung as David Ho
- Ada Wong as Ada
- Gloria Wong as Bobo
- Chan Pak-lei as Fifi
- Frankie Ng as Triad boss
- Lee Kim-wing as Triad boss
- Chan Kam-pui as Triad boss
- Siu Hung as Triad boss
- Luk Man-wai as SDU member
- Law Wai-kai as Thug
- Tam Kon-chung as Tang Qing's thug
- Lai Chi-wai as Ice's thug
- Benny Lai as Ice's thug
- Johnny Cheung as Thug

== Box office ==
The film grossed US$339,557 (HK$1.89 million) at the Hong Kong box office.

== See also ==
- Wong Jing filmography
