= Bursting Point =

2023 Hong Kong-Chinese film by Dante Lam and Calvin Tong

- Film poster
- 爆裂點
- Directed by: Dante Lam; Calvin Tong
- Screenplay by: Tong Yiu-leung; Wang Shengbo
- Story by: Dante Lam
- Produced by: Dante Lam; Candy Leung
- Starring: Nick Cheung; William Chan; Isabella Leong; Shaun Tam; Tony Yang; Chrissie Chau; Philip Keung
- Cinematography: Choi Man-lung
- Edited by: Fan Wai-shan
- Music by: Elliot Leung (as LH1)
- Production companies: Bona Film Group; Emperor Motion Pictures; Film Fireworks
- Distributed by: Huaxia Film Distribution
- Release dates: December 8, 2023 (Hong Kong, Macau, China, Malaysia); December 14, 2023 (Singapore); January 12, 2024 (Taiwan)
- Running time: 139 minutes
- Countries: Hong Kong; China
- Languages: Cantonese; Mandarin
- Budget: HK$200 million
- Box office: $14 million

Bursting Point (simplified Chinese: 爆裂点; traditional Chinese: 爆裂點) is a 2023 crime action film directed by Dante Lam and Calvin Tong. The film features an ensemble cast include Nick Cheung, William Chan, Isabella Leong, Shaun Tam, Tony Yang, Chrissie Chau, and Philip Keung.

A Hong Kong-Chinese co-production, it is rated Category III in Hong Kong (only for viewers above 18 years old) due to its depiction of violence.

== Plot ==
Anti-narcotics chief inspector Bond Sir (played by Nick Cheung) and undercover police officer Jiang Ming (played by William Chan) secretly implemented a plan to hunt down drug traffickers. As Jiang Ming was forced to tread on the path between right and wrong, he gradually lose his identity.

== Cast ==
- Nick Cheung as Bond Sir, anti-narcotics chief inspector
- William Chan as Jiang Ming, undercover police officer
- Isabella Leong as Ying Xiu, drug manufacturer
- Shaun Tam as Han Yang, drug trafficking organization head
- Philip Keung as Lin Jiu, drug trafficking organization member
- Chrissie Chau as Situ Wei, Han Yang's girlfriend
- Tony Yang as Zheng Wen Lou, Ying Xiu's husband
- Tai Yiu Ming as Sha, anti-narcotics police
- Wong You Nam as Lil' Chi, anti-narcotics police
- Julius Brian Siswojo as Joe, drug trafficking organization member
- Jonathan Cheung as Roy, Han Yang's brother
- Kevin Chu as Suave, anti-narcotics police
- Angus Yeung as Kui, anti-narcotics police
- German Cheung as Tiger, drug trafficking organization member
- Adrien Yau Tsz Him as Howard, Bond's son
- Natalie Hsu as Ling, Ying Xiu's daughter
- Bryant Mak as Han, Ying Xiu's brother
- Bill Lee Man Piu as Uncle Bill, anti-narcotics veteran
- Kumer So as Yong, drug trafficking organization head
- Henick Chou as Fishball
- Vincent Sze as Mr Kawai's agent
- Aki Lee as Mr Kawai, Japanese drug dealer
- Jordon Voon as Nguyen, drug dealer
- Keith Ng as Uncle Fire
- Ken Lo as Uncle Chi
- Natalie Tong as Liu Qing, Zheng Wen Lou's current wife

== Production ==
The film began production in Hong Kong on July 21, 2022, with parts of it being filmed in Malaysia. On October 26, 2022, it was reported that some of the crew and cast were trapped in a Malaysia cave for 3 hours after filming due to floods caused by heavy rain.

== Soundtrack ==
No.	Title	Lyrics	Music	Performer	Length
1.	"Real Men 大丈夫"	James Wong Jim	Liu Chia-chang	Nick Cheung, William Chan

== Release ==
The film held its first gala premiere in Hong Kong on November 28, 2023, and a second one in Beijing, China on December 6, 2023. It was released in Hong Kong, Macau, China and Malaysia on December 8, 2023.
