= Exodus (2007 Hong Kong film) =

2007 Hong Kong film by Pang Ho-cheung

- Film poster
- Traditional Chinese: 出埃及記
- Simplified Chinese: 出埃及记
- Hanyu Pinyin: Chū Āi Jí Jì
- Jyutping: Ceot1 Ngaai1 Kap6 Gei3
- Directed by: Pang Ho-cheung
- Screenplay by: Pang Ho-cheung; Cheuk Wan-chi; Jimmy Wan
- Story by: Pang Ho-cheung
- Produced by: Pang Ho-cheung
- Starring: Simon Yam; Annie Liu; Nick Cheung; Maggie Shiu; Irene Wan
- Cinematography: Charlie Lam
- Edited by: Stanley Tam
- Music by: Gabriele Roberto
- Production companies: Filmko Entertainment; Making Film Productions
- Release date: 13 September 2007
- Running time: 94 minutes
- Country: Hong Kong
- Language: Cantonese

Exodus (出埃及記) is a 2007 Hong Kong black comedy thriller film written, produced and directed by Pang Ho-cheung and starring Simon Yam.

== Cast ==
- Simon Yam as Sergeant Tsim Kin-yip
- Annie Liu as Ann
- Nick Cheung as Kwan Ping-man
- Maggie Shiu as Fong
- Irene Wan as Pun Siu-yuen
- Candice Yu as Ann's mother
- Pal Sinn as Ann's father
- Gordon Lam as Renovation contractor Fai
- Jim Chim as Man in wheelchair
- Gregory Charles Rivers as Duty officer
- Sire Ma as Bridesmaid
- Siu Yam-yam as Professor teaching poison
- Cheuk Wan-chi as Professor teaching electronic

== Critical reception ==
The film opened to generally very positive reviews with the Hong Kong press. Perry Lam, in Muse, praised Simon Yam's performance, claiming the film featured 'the best acting that the prolific and still under-recognised Yam has done.'
