= My Wife Is a Gambling Maestro =

2008 Hong Kong film by Wong Jing

- Film poster
- Directed by: Wong Jing
- Written by: Wong Jing; Anselm Chan
- Produced by: Wong Jing
- Starring: Nick Cheung; Natalie Meng Yao
- Cinematography: Ng King Man
- Edited by: Li Kar Wing
- Music by: Lincoln Lo
- Production companies: Mega-Vision Pictures (MVP); See Movie
- Distributed by: Mega-Vision Pictures (MVP)
- Release date: 1 May 2008
- Running time: 98 minutes
- Country: Hong Kong
- Language: Cantonese

My Wife Is a Gambling Maestro (simplified Chinese: 我老婆系赌圣; traditional Chinese: 我老婆係賭聖 is a 2008 Hong Kong film directed by Wong Jing, it is a parody to his early God of Gamblers, featuring a female lead (played by Natalie Meng) as a master gambler and a romantic comedy storyline.

== Cast ==
- Nick Cheung
- Natalie Meng Yao
- Cheung Tat Ming
- Ben Cheung Ka Lun
- Danny Chan Kwok Kwan
- Wong Jing
- Samuel Pang
- Winnie Leung Man Yee
- Jacqueline Chong
- Yedda Chiu Tong
- Lee Lik Chi
