= The Borderline (Hong Kong TV series) =

- Genre: Police procedural
- Starring: Liu Kai-chi; Dominic Lam; Leila Tong; Lawrence Chou; Joman Chiang; Annie Liew; Philip Keung; Crystal Leung; Calvin Lui
- Country of origin: Hong Kong
- Original language: Cantonese
- No. of episodes: 17

Production
- Production location: Hong Kong
- Camera setup: Multi-camera
- Running time: 41–60 minutes
- Production company: Hong Kong Television Network

Original release
- Release: November 19 – December 11, 2014

The Borderline (Chinese: 警界線) is a police procedural television series produced by Hong Kong Television Network. Each episode costs HK$1 million to produce. The first episode premiered on November 19, 2014.

== Cast ==
- Liu Kai-chi as To Yat-fei
- Dominic Lam as Cheung Gwan
- Leila Tong as Ting Siu-hoi
- Lawrence Chou as Choi Ying-yeung
- Joman Chiang as Fong Jou-man
- Annie Liew as Yip Mei-gyun
- Philip Keung as Tse Dai-hak
- Crystal Leung as Hui Lok-sa
- Calvin Lui as Chan Jeun-tai
- Deon Cheung as Ho Yi
- Lam Lei as Wong Chi-gin, guest star
- Yu Mo-lin as Yu Chat-hei
- Felix Lok as Cheuk Bak-san
- Wong Ching as Cheng Chiu
- Kathy Yuen as Rachel, guest star episode 11, 14, 16
- Luvin Ho as Pepper
- Wu Kwing-lung as Mok Siu-lung
- Oscar Li as Shek Bak-chung
- Dexter Young as Fung Wai-hung
- Karen Lee as Sum Yeuk-tung
