= Fire of Conscience =

2010 Hong Kong-Chinese film by Dante Lam

- Theatrical release poster
- Directed by: Dante Lam
- Screenplay by: Jack Ng
- Story by: Dante Lam
- Produced by: Dante Lam; Candy Leung
- Starring: Leon Lai; Richie Jen; Wang Baoqiang; Vivian Hsu; Liu Kai-chi; Michelle Ye; Wilfred Lau
- Cinematography: Charlie Lam; Tse Chung-to
- Edited by: Chan Kei-hop
- Music by: Henry Lai Wan-man
- Production companies: Media Asia Films; China Film Media Asia Audio Video Distribution
- Distributed by: Media Asia Distribution
- Release date: 1 April 2010
- Running time: 105 minutes
- Countries: Hong Kong; China
- Languages: Cantonese; Mandarin

Fire of Conscience (Chinese: 火龍; lit. 'Fire Dragon') is a 2010 action film directed by Dante Lam and starring Leon Lai and Richie Jen. A Hong Kong-Chinese co-production, the film was released in Hong Kong on 1 April 2010.

== Cast ==
- Leon Lai as Detective Manfred
- Richie Jen as Inspector Kee
- Wang Baoqiang as Xiao Yong
- Vivian Hsu as Ellen
- Liu Kai-chi as Cheung On
- Michelle Ye as May
- Charles Ying as Sam
- Wilfred Lau as Hoi

== Production ==
Director Dante Lam explained that the title of the film originates from the traditional fire dragon dance that Hong Kong residents used to practice to drive off pestilence and that he believes that there is pestilence in every human's soul that must be beaten out. Leon Lai prepared for his action scenes by exercising, jogging and swimming. Richie Jen stated that Lam wanted him to "lose weight to add more shadiness to my character. But before making any extra effort, I found myself thinner thanks to the hot weather and so many fighting scenes to shoot." Lai suggested that both Jen and he should sing as a duet for the theme song for the film. Jen stated that he "felt strange. But I liked the song instantly when Mark Lui finished it. We hope the song can lead the audience into a deeper understanding about the movie."

== Release ==
Fire of Conscience premiered at the Hong Kong Film Festival on March 23, 2010. It received wide release in China and Hong Kong on April 1, 2010. Fire of Conscience's debuted at fourth place at the Hong Kong box office and charted in Singapore, Malaysia, and New Zealand. The film stayed in the charts for four weeks in Hong Kong. The film grossed a total of US$526,017 in Hong Kong and US$806,708 world-wide.

== Reception ==
Perry Lam of Muse magazine writes, 'in designing and executing the action scenes, [Lam] focuses too much on firepower and body count, and too little on their potential transgressive and transformational power.' Time Out Hong Kong gave the film a rating of three out of six stars noting that it was slightly less memorable than Dante Lam's previous film Beast Stalker.

The Montreal Gazette gave a mixed review, saying that the film is "exciting, visually stunning movie, full of action and the bright punchy colours of a Sharp Quattron commercial. Unfortunately, it’s not much more than that." IFC gave a mixed review stating that "Lam's action is innovative and clever, but his approach to the characters is the exact opposite: predictable and obvious. We know these cops from so many previous movies. Not a single thing they do surprises us." The Hollywood Reporter described the film as "the loudest of the year" and "Any real thought about the nature of duty and the law is swept aside for action, action, and more action – which is average for Lam but still superior to most."

The Montreal Mirror called the film a disappointment of the Toronto Film Festival, noting "incoherent plotting" and that "Lam obviously has some action chops, but he doesn’t exploit them nearly enough here."
