= The Vampire Who Admires Me =

2008 Hong Kong film by Cub Chin

- Film poster
- Directed by: Cub Chin
- Written by: Wong Jing
- Produced by: Wong Jing
- Starring: Samuel Pang; Roger Kwok; JJ Jia; Natalie Meng Yao; Ankie Beilke; Maggie Li; Winnie Leung; Tanya Ng
- Cinematography: Ng King-Man
- Edited by: Li Kar Wing
- Music by: Lincoln Lo
- Production companies: Mega-Vision Pictures (MVP); See Movie; Wong Jing's Workshop Ltd.
- Distributed by: Mega-Vision Pictures (MVP)
- Release date: 16 October 2008
- Running time: 93 minutes
- Country: Hong Kong
- Language: Cantonese

The Vampire Who Admires Me (Chinese: 有隻僵屍暗戀你; Cantonese Yale: Yau chat guen see um leun nei) is a 2008 Hong Kong mystery comedy film directed by Cub Chin starring Samuel Pang and Roger Kwok and actresses JJ Jia Maggie Li, Natalie Meng, model Ankie Beilke, Winnie Leung, and model Tanya Ng.

== Plot ==
On Tung Lung Island, far from the city, the police station only has Uncle Sha Zhanfa, police officers Sha Danwei and Wenzai. They are very lazy because nothing happens on weekdays, but the headquarters sends Madam Xu to rectify it. She is vigorous and resolute, which makes the three people very uncomfortable.

King, the head of a youth clothing brand, accompanied by director Roman, model manager Sister Kimchi, and models Macy, Chelsea, BiBi, Apple, and Susie, traveled to Tung Lung Island to take swimsuit photographs and hold a gathering.

They didn't know that there was King's ancestral tomb on Tung Lung Island. His great-grandfather Situ Ke was cursed and turned into a zombie to resurrect and harm people. Later, the master used magic power to trap him back in the tomb and suppressed him with a talisman tablet. But King's servant Ah Sheng and the island girl Lingling had an affair next to the ancient tomb one night, desecrated the talisman tablet, and lost his magic power. The old zombie dragged the two into the ground and bit them. Lingling was killed and turned into a zombie. Ah Sheng escaped by chance, but was poisoned by the corpse and slowly turned into a zombie. Unfortunately, the beautiful models were unaware of the danger. Sister Kimchi and Chelsea fought for King, the diamond bachelor. At first, they had a quarrel, and then they fought. During the fight, they didn't know that King had been bitten to death by Lingling, who had turned into a zombie. Ah Sheng was about to turn into a zombie, but he still had a trace of conscience. He knew that Macy was psychic, so he informed Macy in a spirit that the old zombie would be unearthed... But Madam Xu insisted that she didn't believe that there were zombies in the world. At this time, the No. 8 typhoon signal was hoisted and traffic on the island was cut off. Three days later, the old zombie was unearthed and bit the residents on the island crazily, turning them all into zombies. The police officers and beautiful girls were in danger and were isolated on the island. They were all going to become the prey of the old zombie...

== Cast ==
- Samuel Pang as King
- Roger Kwok as Wayne Sa
- JJ Jia as Macy
- Natalie Meng Yao as Chelsea
- Ankie Beilke as BiBi
- Maggie Li as Apple
- Winnie Leung as Kimchi
- Tanya Ng as Susie
- Jo Kuk as Madam Sarah Chui
- Sam Lee as Roman
- Ben Cheung as Victor
- Angel Ho as Jill
- Siu Fei as Mann
- Ha Yu as Uncle Faye
- Wong Tin-Lam as Uncle Pine
- Lee Fung as Macy's grandmother
- Si Ming as Jill's mother
- Wong Wai-Tong as Vampire King #1
- Cheung Wing-Cheung as Vampire King #2
- Wong Chun-Sing

== Reception ==
A 2009 review states that "This is an odd one in that it uses the traditional kyonsi and yet throws in a Western horror sensibility (most notably, I thought, borrowing from the zombie genre in tone) as well as throwing in a more traditionally Hong Kong cinema sense of humour." This comment is confirmed by a retrospective review: "It was like a ride back into the horror comedy films that proliferated in the late 1990s in fare like Bio-Zombie, the Troublesome Night films and the anthologies with times in the title like Midnight Zone and 1 a.m. The only thing it was missing was an appearance from Helen Law Lan who was in nearly all the horror films of that period." This statement is confirmed again by yet another review but in a more negative approach: "Wong Jing should perhaps turn away from echoing the olden days while Cub Chien might blossom under someone else."

Another review gives a mildly positive assessment: "The Vampire Who Admires Me is hard to rate as good, but it still amuses and is certainly better than other recent Wong Jing efforts."
