= Jiang hu: The Triad Zone =

2000 Hong Kong film by Dante Lam

- Film poster
- Directed by: Dante Lam
- Written by: Chan Hing-ka; Amy Chin
- Produced by: Chan Hing-ka; Amy Chin
- Starring: Tony Leung Ka-fai; Sandra Ng; Anthony Wong; Eason Chan; Law Lan
- Cinematography: Cheung Man-po
- Edited by: Chan Ki-hop
- Music by: Tommy Wai
- Production company: One Hundred Years of Film
- Distributed by: China Star Entertainment Group
- Release date: 21 September 2000 (Hong Kong)
- Running time: 107 minutes
- Country: Hong Kong
- Language: Cantonese
- Box office: HK$1,626,690

Jiang hu: The Triad Zone (江湖告急) is a 2000 Hong Kong crime comedy film directed by Dante Lam and starring Tony Leung Ka-fai, Sandra Ng, Anthony Wong and Eason Chan.

== Plot ==
News has spread that triad leader Jimmy Yam (Tony Leung Ka-fai) will be assassinated within 24 hours. Yam, who has an exaggerated personality, would like to use this opportunity to expand his power and influence and sees the true side of people around him, including his wife Sophie (Sandra Ng), counselor Wai (Chan Fai-hung), bodyguard Yue (Roy Cheung), rival Luk See (Robert Siu), triad newcomer Tiger (Samuel Pang), and his sworn brother Jeff (Eric Tsang), a voluntary scapegoat who served in person for Yam, all of whom have another side which Yam had never known.

== Cast and roles ==
- Tony Leung Ka-fai as Jimmy Yam
- Sandra Ng as Sophie Yam
- Anthony Wong Chau-sang as Master Kwan Wan-cheung
- Eason Chan as Chan Chin-wah
- Jo Kuk as Tiger's girlfriend
- Roy Cheung as Ho Kwun-yue
- Lee Siu-kei as Kei
- Chan Fai-hung as Counselor Wai
- Law Lan as Kei's widow
- Lee San-san as Jo Jo Cheung
- Samuel Pang as Tiger
- Eric Tsang as Jeff
- Chapman To as Tung Tung
- Lee Lik-Chi as Ox Dung
- Richard Ng as London street vendor
- Ann Hui as Sister 13
- Maria Chung sd Ping
- Lam Chi-Sing as Jo Jo's Brother
- Carl Ng as Carl
- Hugo Ng as Big Mouth
- Robert Siu as Luk See
