= Liu Kai-chi =

Hong Kong actor (1953–2021)

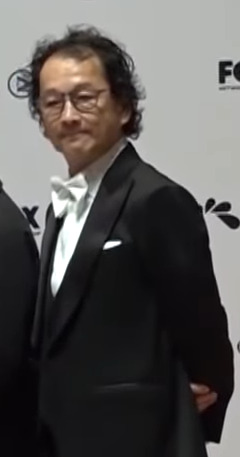
- Liu with the crew of the film Project Gutenberg on 14 April 2019, after the 38th Hong Kong Film Awards
- Born: 30 September 1953; British Hong Kong
- Died: 28 March 2021 (aged 67); Sha Tin, Hong Kong
- Years active: 1979–2021
- Spouse: Barbara Chan Man-yee (m. 1987)
- Children: 3 sons
- Awards: Hong Kong Film Awards – Best Supporting Actor; 1993 Cageman; 2009 Beast Stalker

Chinese name
- Traditional Chinese: 廖啟智
- Simplified Chinese: 廖启智
Transcriptions
Standard Mandarin
- Hanyu Pinyin: Liào Qǐzhì
Yue: Cantonese
- Jyutping: Liu^{6} Kai^{2} Zi^{3}

Dick Liu Kai-chi (Chinese: 廖啟智, 30 September 1953 – 28 March 2021) was a Hong Kong actor, best known for his everyman supporting roles. His career spanned over 40 years, with appearances in over 90 television series and 70 films. He earned eight nominations at the Hong Kong Film Awards for Best Supporting Actor, two of which he won; one for his role in the 1992 comedy Cageman, and the other for the action thriller Beast Stalker in 2009.

== Career ==
Liu had been interested in acting at an early age, and decided to enter the film industry after graduating high school. He took on various film crew positions to accumulate industry experience, and was initially rejected from acting school because of his height and "ordinary" appearance. He was eventually accepted into the TVB artist training programme in 1979. Liu was first known for his appearance in the hit 1980 TV series The Bund.

Liu won his first Hong Kong Film Award for Best Supporting Actor in 1993 for his role as Prince Sam in the comedy Cageman. He was subsequently nominated for the award in 2004 and 2006 for his performance in Infernal Affairs II and SPL: Sha Po Lang respectively, before winning the award a second time in 2009 for the Dante Lam film Beast Stalker, in which Liu plays the role of a policeman. Liu continued to work with Lam on a number of films including The Sniper and The Stool Pigeon, the latter of which earned him another nomination for Best Supporting Actor in 2011.

In 2014, Liu was cast in a leading role for two Hong Kong Television Network drama productions, The Election and The Borderline. The two dramas were selected in a public poll for their online launch on 19 November 2014.

== Personal life and death ==
On 11 November 1987, Liu married actress Barbara Chan Man-yee, also known as Money Chan, after meeting her in the TVB artist training programme. Together, they had 3 sons. On 5 April 2006, Liu lost his youngest son, six-year-old Liu Man-lok to leukemia, after a three-year struggle with the terminal illness. Both Liu and Chan were known for being committed Christians, which Chan credits for helping her overcome the death of her son.

In March 2021, it was reported that Liu was suffering from gastric cancer; Chan replied to a media interview to confirm the diagnosis. Liu had discovered the condition in December 2020, and had to suspend work for treatment. Liu died of gastric cancer on 28 March 2021 at 8:32 pm in Prince of Wales Hospital, surrounded by his family. His funeral service was held in April 2021 at St Andrew's Church, Kowloon

In honour of Liu, a special tribute featuring his final TVB performance on Law dis-Order was broadcast on TVB Jade.

== Filmography ==
Liu was involved in 74 films, and over 90 television shows throughout his acting career. Five of his films were released posthumously.
