= Nick Cheung =

Hong Kong actor (born 1964)

- 張家輝
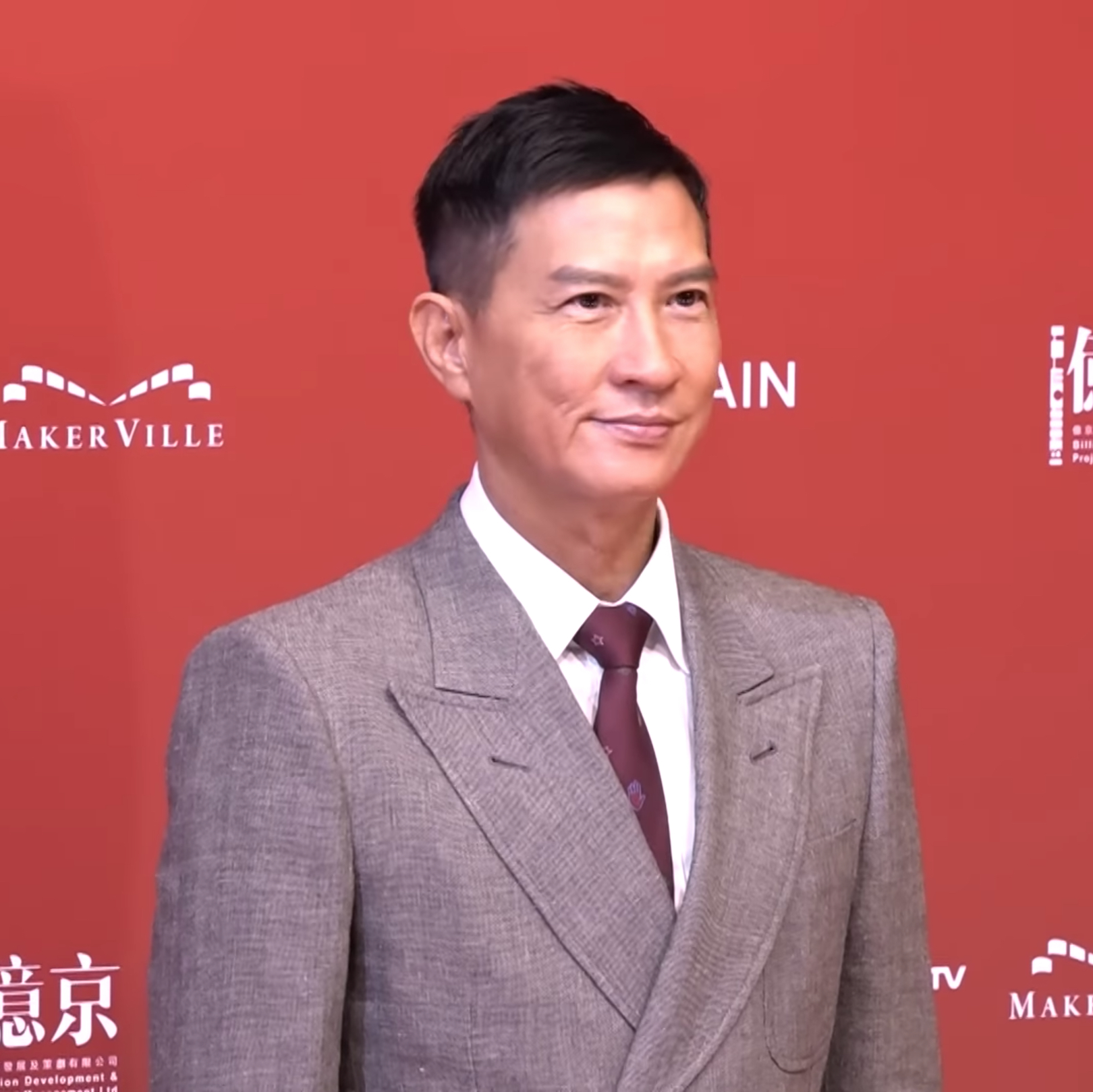
- Cheung in 2022
- Born: 2 December 1964 (age 61); Hong Kong
- Education: Royal Hong Kong Police Cadet School
- Occupations: Actor; director; singer
- Years active: 1989–present
- Spouse: Esther Kwan (m. 2003)
- Children: Brittany Cheung (daughter)
- Awards: Hong Kong Film Awards – Best Actor; 2009 Beast Stalker; 2014 Unbeatable Hong Kong Film Critics Society Awards – Best Actor; 2008 Beast Stalker; 2013 Unbeatable Golden Horse Awards – Best Actor; 2009 Beast Stalker TVB Anniversary Awards – Most Improving Actor; 1998 Secret of the Heart

Chinese name
- Traditional Chinese: 張家輝
- Simplified Chinese: 张家辉
Transcriptions
Standard Mandarin
- Hanyu Pinyin: Zhāng Jiāhuī
Yue: Cantonese
- Jyutping: Zoeng1 Gaa1fai1

Nicholas Cheung Ka-fai (Chinese: 張家輝; Jyutping: zoeng1 gaa1 fai1; born 2 December 1964) is a Hong Kong actor, singer and director. He first gained recognition for his roles in The Conman (1998) and The Tricky Master (1999). He went on to star in the films Beast Stalker (2008), The Stool Pigeon (2010), Nightfall (2012), Unbeatable (2013), The White Storm (2013), Helios (2015), Keeper of Darkness (2015), Line Walker (2016), Bodies at Rest (2019), and Peg O' My Heart (2024). For his performances in Beast Stalker and Unbeatable, Cheung was awarded the Hong Kong Film Award for Best Actor.

== Background ==
He was formerly a Royal Hong Kong Police officer for four years, but he left the job after his request to be transferred to the criminal investigation department was turned down. He then worked for Danny Lee's film production company. His film debut is "Thank you, Sir!", as a student at the Royal Hong Kong Cadet School. From 1989 to 1994, he worked at the television station ATV World. Later, he left ATV and joined another station, TVB. He left TVB in 2004, and worked mainly on films. His fame was built on Wong Jing's comedy at first, but he has changed his acting style for more sombre roles since 2003. He was nominated for his first Hong Kong film award in 1999, and won his first award in 2009 for his role in Beast Stalker. He has been nominated many times at the Hong Kong Film Awards and other Chinese film awards since.

Cheung has won seven awards for his role in Beast Stalker (2008), including Hong Kong Film Critics Society Award for Best Actor, Hong Kong Film Award for Best Actor, and Golden Horse Film Award for Best Actor.

In 2013, he also won praise and Best Actor awards for his role as an aging MMA fighter in Unbeatable.

== Personal life ==
Cheung met Hong Kong actress Esther Kwan while he was still working at ATV. They married on 8 December 2003 in Australia. Their daughter, Brittany Cheung (張童; Cheung Tung), was born on 24 January 2006.

Cheung earned 75 million HKD in 2014.

== Filmography ==
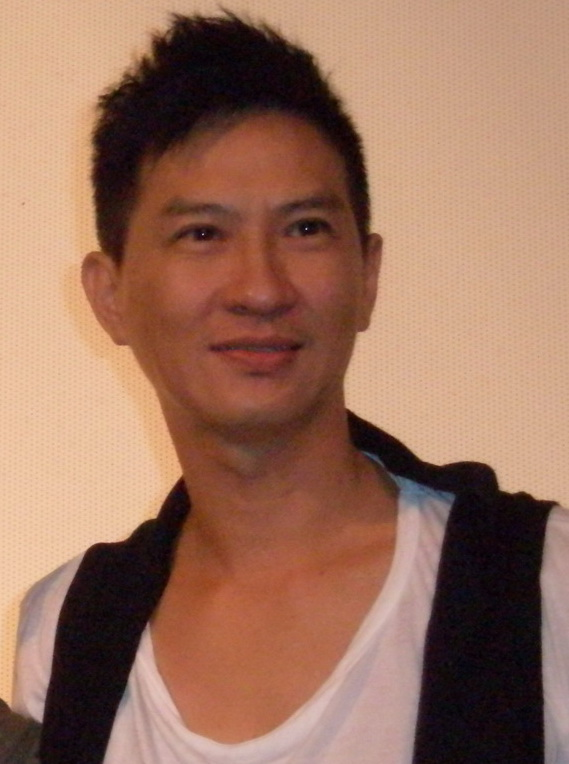
Cheung in 2010

=== Film ===
Year	Title	Role	Notes/Ref.
1989	Thank You, Sir	Cheung Ka-fai	
1989	News Attack	Policeman at station	
1990	It Takes Two to Mingle	Policeman	a.k.a. Takes Two to Mingle
1990	Unmatchable Match	Policeman	
1990	Against All	Cheung Ka-fai (Steve)	a.k.a. Again All
1991	Red Shield	Hui	
1992	Slice of Life		
1992	The Lucky Family	Jiu-choi	
1992	Laser Drama - To Be a Gamble King	Grasshopper	
1992	What a Hero!	Cop	
1992	The Unleaded Love	Chung	
1993	Raped by an Angel	Dick	a.k.a. Naked Killer 2
1994	Born Innocent		
1994	Shoot to Kill	Loo Sek-on	
1994	Wounded Tracks	Ma Tian	
1995	Informer		
1995	Asian Connection	Rocky Sly / Casper	
1996	Moonlight Sonata	Keung	TV movie
1996	Ah Kam	Whacko	a.k.a. The Stuntwoman a.k.a. Ah Kam: Story of a Stuntwoman
1998	The Conman	Dragon	Nominated – Hong Kong Film Award for Best Supporting Actor
1999	Raped By An Angel 4: The Rapist's Union	Smart Fai	
1999	Prince Charming	Tart	
1999	The King of Debt Collecting Agent		
1999	The Conmen in Vegas	Dragon	
1999	The Tricky Master	Leung Foon	
1999	He is My Enemy, Partner and Father-in-law	Stallone	
1999	The Lord of Amusement	Yeung Chin-wah	
2000	My Name is Nobody	No-Name	
2000	The Duel	Dragon 9	
2000	Conman in Tokyo	Jersey	
2000	The Teacher Without Chalk	Cheung Ying	
2000	Love Correction	Anson Cheung	
2000	Clean My Name, Mr. Coroner!	Fred Cheung	
2001	Day Off	Lok	
2001	Runaway	Dan	
2001	Every Dog Has His Date	King Fai	
2002	Time 4 Hope	Yuen Kai-chi	
2002	Happy Family	Small Han Sang	
2002	The Conman 2002	Lee Ka-sing / Dommer	a.k.a. Conman 2002
2003	Fate Fighter	Leung	
2003	Shiver	Dr. Ko Chuen	
2004	Love is Love	Jia Jia-ming	
2004	Breaking News	Insp. Cheung Chi-hang	
2005	Election	Jet	
2006	Election 2	Jet	Nominated – Hong Kong Film Award for Best Supporting Actor
2006	On the Edge	Harry Sin	
2006	Exiled	Wo	
2006	Wise Guys Never Die	Nick Wong	
2007	Sweet Revenge	Cheung Siu-chun	
2007	Exodus	Kwan Ping-man	Nominated – Hong Kong Film Award for Best Supporting Actor
2008	My Wife is a Gambling Maestro	Jay Chou	
2008	Connected	Detective Fai	
2008	Beast Stalker	Hung King	Hong Kong Film Critics Society Award for Best Actor; Hong Kong Film Award for Best Actor; Golden Horse Film Award for Best Actor; Nominated – Asian Film Award for Best Supporting Actor
2009	Red River	A Xia	
2009	To Live and Die in Mongkok	Fai	
2010	The Stool Pigeon	Inspector Don Lee	Nominated – Hong Kong Film Award for Best Actor; Nominated – Hong Kong Film Critics Society Award for Best Actor
2011	The Founding of a Party	Liang Qichao	
2011	Treasure Inn	Lo Pa	
2012	Nightfall	Wong Yuen-yeung	Nominated – Hong Kong Film Award for Best Actor; Nominated – 49th Golden Horse Film Awards for Best Actor
2012	Cross	Wong Mei-bo	
2013	Conspirators	Tseng Fung-hei	
2013	Unbeatable	Cheng Fai	Hong Kong Film Critics Society Award for Best Actor; Hong Kong Film Awards for Best Actor; Shanghai International Film Festival for Best Actor; Nominated – 50th Golden Horse Film Awards for Best Actor
2013	The White Storm	Cheung Tsz-wai	
2014	Golden Chicken 3	Gordon	
2014	That Demon Within	Hon Kong / Riot police officer	
2014	Hungry Ghost Ritual	Zong Hua	Also director
2014	Temporary Family	Hong Siu-long	
2015	From Vegas to Macau II	Mark	
2015	Helios	Chief Inspector Eric Lee Yan-ming	
2015	Keeper of Darkness		Also director
2016	From Vegas to Macau III	Mark	
2016	Line Walker	Blue	
2018	The Trough	Yu Chau	Also director
2019	Line Walker 2: Invisible Spy	Inspector Ching	
2019	Bodies at Rest		
2019	Hypnotize the Jury		
2019	Integrity	Hui Chik-yiu	
2022	Warriors of Future	Sean Li	
2023	Bursting Point	Bond Sir	
2023	Wolf Hiding		
2024	Peg O' My Heart	Choi San-keung	Also as director and writer
TBD	The Trier of Fact		

=== Television ===
Year	Title	Role	Notes
1990	No Way Out	Chung Kin	
1991	Who is the Winner	Seeto Siu-ming	
1992	Pride Knows No Love	Ng Tim-fuk	
1992	Spirit of the Dragon	Tong Fat	a.k.a. Story of Bruce Lee
1993	War of the Couple		
1993	Silver Tycoon	Yeu Kuk-yen	
1993	Gambler's Dream	Ho Sing-long	
1993	Race-Course Fever	Champion Ma	
1993	Who is the Winner II	Lau Ka-tsoi	
1993	The Brutal Trial	Leung Tin-loi	
1994	The Kung Fu Master	Fong Sai-yuk	
1994	Beauty Pageant		
1995	House of Horror: Siren Song		
1997	Mystery Files	Siu Cheuk-nam	
1997	A Recipe for the Heart	Ah Fai	Guest star
1997	Triumph Over Evil	Cheung Chun-tin	
1998	Secret of the Heart	Kelvin Kam Leung-wang	TVB Award for Most Improved Actor
1998	Healing Hands	Peter Cheung Chong-yip	
1998	Moments of Endearment	Chan Yau-chung	
1999	Game of Deceit	Yu Jung-jing	
1999	A Smiling Ghost Story	Fong Ji-lung	
2000	The Legendary Four Aces	Tong Bak-fu	TVB Award for My Favourite Television Character
2001	Law Enforcers	Chou Ka-wing	
2003	Ups and Downs in the Sea of Love	Jason Tin Wai-san	
2003	Drunken Kungfu		
2004	The Last Breakthrough	Albert Wong Po-fun	
2005	Xin Zui Da Jin Zhi	Guo Ai	a.k.a. Taming of the Shrew a.k.a. Princess Sheng Ping
2007	Best Selling Secrets	customer	Episode 137: "Despicable Big Brother"
2025	Justice is Mine	Chun Yu	

=== Dubbing roles ===
Cheung has also provided Cantonese voice dubs for foreign films and television programmes.

Year	Title	Role	Original actor	Notes
2009	Avatar	Jake Sully	Sam Worthington	Lead role

Awards and achievements
Preceded by Tony Leung Ka-Fai for Eye in the Sky Tony Leung Ka-Fai for Cold War	Hong Kong Film Critics Society Awards for Best Actor; 2008 for Beast Stalker 2013 for Unbeatable	Succeeded by Wang Xueqi for Bodyguards and Assassins Sean Lau for Overheard 3
Preceded by Jet Li for The Warlords Chapman To for Diva	Hong Kong Film Awards for Best Actor; 2009 for Beast Stalker 2014 for Unbeatable	Succeeded by Simon Yam for Echoes of the Rainbow Sean Lau for Overheard 3
