= Beast Stalker =

2008 Hong Kong film by Dante Lam

- Film poster
- Directed by: Dante Lam
- Written by: Dante Lam; Jack Ng
- Produced by: Dante Lam; Candy Leung; Cheung Hong-tat
- Starring: Nicholas Tse; Zhang Jingchu; Nick Cheung
- Cinematography: Cheung Man-po; Tse Chung-to
- Edited by: Chan Ki-hop
- Music by: Henry Lai Wan-man
- Distributed by: Emperor Motion Pictures
- Release date: 27 November 2008 (Hong Kong)
- Running time: 109 minutes
- Country: Hong Kong
- Languages: Cantonese; Mandarin
- Box office: HK$8 million

Beast Stalker (Chinese: 証人) is a 2008 Hong Kong action thriller film directed by Dante Lam (who also wrote the screenplay with Jack Ng, and produced with Candy Leung and Cheung Hong-tat). The film stars Nicholas Tse, Nick Cheung, and Zhang Jingchu. The film is about a traffic car accident that changes multiple people's lives forever.

== Plot ==
Sergeant Tong Fei (Nicholas Tse) is a no-nonsense Hong Kong cop. One day during a police bust with his team who include Sun (Liu Kai Chi), Christy (Sherman Chung) and Michael (Derek Kok). During a raid, Sun is shot by a fleeing suspect due to an unreliable snitch and Michael failing to act during a door breach. Sun's bulletproof vest saves him from harm. Tong berates Michael and vows to have him transferred off the team. On the same day, Tong and Sun are called to investigate a car stolen by a crew of criminals who just finished committing a series of robberies. When Tong and Sun pursue them, they get into a serious car accident involving a passing Jeep who seriously cripples Sun. Tong shoots at the fleeing criminals, killing 2 of them and causing them to crash the hijacked car. The lead criminal falls into a coma. To Tong's horror, he discovers he also accidentally shot dead Yee, the elder daughter of public prosecutor and single mother Gao Min (Zhang Jingchu), who was placed in the trunk of their car when the criminals hijacked Gao's vehicle. Unable to handle the guilt, Tong succumbs to a fog of pain. Gao, meanwhile, pours all her love and attention to her younger daughter Ling.

Three months later, the lead criminal Cheung Yat-tung (Philip Keung) awakens from his coma. Gao Min, who had been working hard on bringing him to justice, insists he stand trial immediately. However complications arise as Ling is suddenly kidnapped by a man seriously damaged in one eye known as Hung King (Nick Cheung) who does shady jobs for hire and has his own agenda. Gao is threatened by the kidnapper to change evidence for Cheung's trial to get him acquitted. Tong is once again thrust into a cat and mouse game to not only save Gao's other daughter but also as redemption from his past mistakes.

Tong tries at first to enlist Gao's assistance but Gao outright refuses claiming she would rather have any other cop save Ling but not Tong as his appearance constantly reminds her of Yee. Tong's investigation goes off the books and leads him to a garbage centre where is discovers the kidnappers SIM card. Tong is forced to turn to help from Christy and then Michael, who at first refuses to cooperate because of Tong constantly writing bad reports about him in the past and also revealing that Michael is also Tong's cousin. After Tongg apologizes for his actions in the past, Michael eventually relents and assists Tong track the sim card and also Gao's MMS and contact with the kidnapper revealing Ling is being held in an apartment with Neon Lights nearby.

As Tong and Sun try to pinpoint Ling's location. Sun goes for a lunch break in a restaurant but coincidentally spots Hung in the same restaurant Sun tries to discreetly alert Tong but Hung catches on and flees. A lengthy chase ensures where Tong attempts to Hung, but Hung's fighting skills overpower Tong and disarm him of his weapon. Gunshots from Tong's sidearm attract the attention of multiple Hong Kong PTU officers who gave chase, however Hung is able to evade all the officers in his way. Tong catches up with Hung, but Hung runs into a nearby armored car and knocks out a security guard commandeering his shotgun and pinning down Tong and the pursuing PTU officers. Haunted briefly by Yee's death, Tong eventually leaves cover and attempt to apprehend Hung but finds that Hung has disappeared and vanished from the scene.

Soon after, Tong is forced to surrender his sidearm, pending an officer involved investigation. Gao hears the news and arrives on scene. Tong reveals to Gao about the location where Ling was held. As Tong and Sun enters Hung's apartment, they discover a hidden room where they found Hung's wife whose in a deteriorative state. When Hung has taken back his wife from the police, Tong tracks him down through GPS where he finds Hung and beats him in the head with a rock. As Ling was recovered, Hung who is now fully blind, surrenders himself to the police. It was revealed that Hung was the driver of the Jeep from the earlier car accident, which results him critical injuries along with his wife. The film ends with Tong walks away with Ling as she reunites with her mother.

== Cast ==
- Nicholas Tse as Sergeant Tong Fei
- Nick Cheung as Hung King
- Zhang Jingchu as Ann Gao
- Miao Pu as Li
- Liu Kai-chi as Sun
- Sherman Chung as Christy
- Zhang He as Thomas
- Lau Kong as Chuen
- Derek Kok as Michael
- Joe Cheung as Judge Lee
- Philip Keung as Cheung Yat-tung
- Wong Suet-yin as Ling
- Wong Sum-yin as Yee
- Cheung Kwok-wai as Fai
- Chan Shu-chi as Chi
- Tse Kai-cheong as Tommy
- Cho King-man as King Man
- Ho Mei-yin as Teacher
- Lam Siu-ha as Baking Instructor
- Esther Kwan as Li (voice)

== Reception ==
Derek Elley of Variety wrote, "Crying out for a Stateside remake from its opening reel, stygian crimer Beast Stalker grips like a vise, and is unquestionably the finest Asian action-psychodrama since South Korea's The Chaser last year." Neil Young of The Hollywood Reporter wrote, "This glossy, flashily directed plausibility-stretcher picks up whenever the bad guy's unusual character and history are being explored, but flattens out when the focus shifts back from pursued to pursuer." G. Allen Johnson of the San Francisco Chronicle called it a new addition to "Hong Kong's great cycle of kinetic action films".

=== Awards and nominations ===
Awards
| Ceremony | Category | Name | Outcome |
|---|---|---|---|
| 15th Hong Kong Film Critics Society Awards | Best Actor | Nick Cheung | Won |
| 15th Hong Kong Film Critics Society Awards | Film of Merit | Beast Stalker | Won |
| 28th Hong Kong Film Awards | Best Screenplay | Jack Ng, Dante Lam | Nominated |
| 28th Hong Kong Film Awards | Best Actor | Nick Cheung | Won |
| 28th Hong Kong Film Awards | Best Supporting Actor | Liu Kai-chi | Won |
| 28th Hong Kong Film Awards | Best Film Editing | Chan Ki-hop | Nominated |
| 28th Hong Kong Film Awards | Best Sound Design | Phyllis Cheng, Nip Kei-wing, David Wong | Nominated |
| 46th Golden Horse Awards | Best Actor | Nick Cheung | Won |
| 46th Golden Horse Awards | Best Action Choreography | Stephen Tung | Nominated |
| 3rd Asian Film Awards | Best Supporting Actor | Nick Cheung | Nominated |
| 3rd Asian Film Awards | Best Editor | Chan Ki-hop | Nominated |
| 53rd Asia Pacific Film Festival | Best Actor | Nick Cheung | Won |
| 10th Changchun Film Festival | Best Actor | Nick Cheung | Won |
