= Dante Lam =

Hong Kong filmmaker

- 林超賢
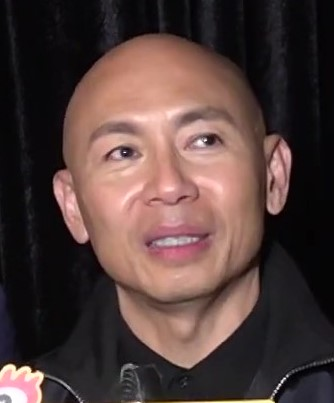
- Lam in 2023
- Born: Lam Chiu-Yin; 1 July 1965 (age 61); British Hong Kong
- Occupations: Film director; screenwriter; film producer; actor; action choreographer

Chinese name
- Traditional Chinese: 林超賢
- Simplified Chinese: 林超贤
Transcriptions
Standard Mandarin
- Hanyu Pinyin: Lín Chāoxián
Yue: Cantonese
- Jyutping: lam4 ciu1 jin4

Dante Lam Chiu-yin (traditional Chinese: 林超賢; simplified Chinese: 林超贤, born 1 July 1965) is a Hong Kong filmmaker, actor and action choreographer.

== Background ==
He was trained in the tradition of John Woo as an assistant director and worked as an actor and producer. He often writes and supervises his own choreography. In 2008 he won the Hong Kong Film Award for Best Director for his work on Beast Stalker.

His 2018 film Operation Red Sea is the second-highest-grossing Chinese film of all time and 9th in the international box office list of 2018. It won him the Hundred Flowers Award for Best Director and the award for Best Action Choreography at the 38th Hong Kong Film Awards.

In the aftermath of the 2019–20 Hong Kong protests, Lam was contracted by the Hong Kong Police Force (HKPF) to produce a video, Guarding Our City, intended to help rehabilitate the police force's public image. The 15-minute video was released on 23 January 2021.

== Filmography ==
=== Director ===
- Option Zero (1997)
- Beast Cops (1998)
- When I Look Upon the Stars (1999)
- Jiang hu: The Triad Zone (2000)
- Runaway (2001)
- Hit Team (2001)
- Tiramisu (2002)
- The Twins Effect (2003)
- Naked Ambition (2003)
- Love on the Rocks (2004)
- Heat Team (2004)
- Undercover Hidden Dragon (2006)
- Sparkling Red Star (2007)
- The Sniper (2008)
- Beast Stalker (2008)
- Storm Rider Clash of the Evils (2008)
- Fire of Conscience (2010)
- The Stool Pigeon (2010)
- The Viral Factor (2011)
- Unbeatable (2013)
- That Demon Within (2014)
- To the Fore (2015)
- Operation Mekong (2016)
- Operation Red Sea (2018)
- The Rescue (2020)
- Guarding Our City (2021, short film)
- The Battle at Lake Changjin (2021)
- The Battle at Lake Changjin II (2022)
- Guarding Our City with Faith: The Prequel (2023, short film)
- Bursting Point (2023)
- Operation Hadal (2025)

=== Producer ===
- Runaway (2001)
- Hit Team (2001)
- U-Man (2002)
- Tiramisu (2002)
- Fire of Conscience (2010)
- The Battle at Lake Changjin (2021)
- The Battle at Lake Changjin II (2022)
- Bursting Point (2023)
