= List of Chinese films of 2025 =

The following is a list of mainland Chinese films first released in year 2025.

== Box office ==
The highest-grossing Chinese films released in 2025, by domestic box office gross revenue, are as follows:

Rank	Title	Domestic gross
1	Ne Zha 2	CN¥15.45 billion ($2.31 billion)
2	Detective Chinatown 1900	CN¥3.61 billion ($539.18 million)
3	Dead to Rights	CN¥3.02 billion ($450.37 million)
4	Evil Unbound	CN¥1.94 billion ($290.04 million)
5	Nobody	CN¥1.72 billion ($256.61 million)
6	The Shadow's Edge	CN¥1.27 billion ($188.98 million)
7	Creation of the Gods II: Demon Force	CN¥1.24 billion ($184.95 million)
8	Boonie Bears: Future Reborn	CN¥822 million ($122.7 million)
9	The Lychee Road	CN¥691 million ($103.15 million)
10	Legends of the Condor Heroes: The Gallants	CN¥690 million ($103 million)

== Released ==
=== January–March ===
Opening		Title	Director(s)	Cast	Genre	Ref.
J A N U A R Y	10	Big Red Envelope 2: Get Rich	Li Kelong		Comedy	
J A N U A R Y	29	Boonie Bears: Future Reborn	Lin Yongchang	Tan Xiao, Zhang Bingjun, Zhang Wei	Animated	
J A N U A R Y	29	Creation of the Gods II: Demon Force	Wuershan	Yu Shi, Fei Xiang	Epic fantasy film	
J A N U A R Y	29	Detective Chinatown 1900	Chen Sicheng	Wang Baoqiang, Liu Haoran and John Cusack	Period buddy comedy mystery	
J A N U A R Y	29	Legends of the Condor Heroes: The Gallants	Tsui Hark	Xiao Zhan, Zhuang Dafei	Wuxia	
J A N U A R Y	29	Ne Zha 2	Jiaozi	Lü Yanting, Han Mo, Lü Qi, Zhang Jiaming	Animated	
J A N U A R Y	29	Operation Hadal	Dante Lam	Huang Xuan, Yu Shi, Zhang Hanyu, and Du Jiang	War	
M A R C H	8	Fire on the Plain	Zhang Ji	Zhou Dongyu, Liu Haoran	Romantic mystery	
M A R C H	8	Girls on Wire	Vivian Qu	Liu Haocun, Wen Qi	Drama	

=== April–June ===
Opening		Title	Director(s)	Cast	Genre	Ref.
A P R I L	3	MuMu	Sha Mo	Lay Zhang, Li Luoan	Drama	
A P R I L	4	Fox Hunt	Leo Zhang	Tony Leung, Duan Yihong	Action crime	
A P R I L	4	We Girls	Feng Xiaogang	Zhao Liying, Lan Xiya, Chuai Ni, Naomi Wang, Cheng Xiao	Crime drama	
A P R I L	30	The Dumpling Queen	Andrew Lau	Ma Li, Kara Wai, Zhu Yawen, Wong Cho-lam, Fiona Sit	Biographical drama	
M A Y	1	A Gilded Game	Herman Yau	Andy Lau, Ou Hao, Ni Ni, Huang Yi, Jiang Mengjie	Action thriller	
M A Y	10	Returning Home	Yang Zhengnong		Documentary	
M A Y	30	Endless Journey of Love	Yu Ao, Zhou Tienan	Karry Wang, Liu Xiaoyu, Zhou Shen, Huang Bo, Jia Bing	Animated	
J U N E	21	Tom and Jerry: Forbidden Compass	Zhang Gang		Animated	
J U N E	21	She's Got No Name	Peter Chan	Zhang Ziyi, Eric Wang, Jackson Yee, Mei Ting, Zhao Liying	Period crime drama	

=== July–September ===
Opening		Title	Director(s)	Cast	Genre	Ref.
J U L Y	5	Malice	Lai Mukuan, Yao Wenyi	Zhang Xiaofei	Drama	
J U L Y	18	You are the Best	Jiang Wen	Jiang Wen, Ma Li, Yu Hewei, He Saifei, Xin Zhilei, Lei Jiayin, Ge You, Eric Wang, Hu Ge, Donnie Yen	Musical drama	
J U L Y	18	The Lychee Road	Dong Chengpeng	Dong Chengpeng, Bai Ke, Zhuang Dafei, Terrance Lau	Historical comedy drama	
J U L Y	18	The Legend of Hei 2	MTJJ	Shan Xin, Liu Mingyue, Zhu Jing, Luan Lisheng, Fu Chenyang, Yan Ling	Animated	
J U L Y	25	The Stage	Chen Peisi	Chen Peisi, Huang Bo, Jiang Wu, Yin Zheng	Comedy drama	
J U L Y	25	Dead to Rights	Shen Ao	Liu Haoran, Eric Wang, Gao Ye, Wang Xiao, Wang Zhen'er	Historical drama	
A U G U S T	2	Nobody	Shui Yu	Chen Ziping, Lu Yang, Dong Wenliang, Liu Cong	Animated	
A U G U S T	8	Dongji Rescue	Guan Hu, Fei Zhenxiang	Zhu Yilong, Leo Wu, Ni Ni	War drama	
A U G U S T	16	The Shadow's Edge	Larry Yang	Jackie Chan, Zhang Zifeng, Tony Leung, Ci Sha	Action crime drama	
S E P T E M B E R	3	Against All Odds	Lau Ho-leung	Han Geng, Mitchell Hoog, Chen Yongsheng, Louise Wong, Philip Ng	War	
S E P T E M B E R	18	731	Zhao Linshan	Jiang Wu, Wang Zhiwen, Li Naiwen, Sun Qian, Feng Wenjuan, Lin Ziye, Irene Wan	Historical drama	
S E P T E M B E R	31	The Volunteers: Peace at Last	Chen Kaige	Zhang Zifeng, Song Jia, Zhu Yawen, Arthur Chen, Peng Yuchang, Xiao Yang	War drama	
S E P T E M B E R	31	Row to Win	Ma Lin	Huang Bo, Fan Chengcheng, Yin Tao	Drama	

=== October–December ===
Opening		Title	Director(s)	Cast	Genre	Ref.
O C T O B E R	1	A Writer's Odyssey 2	Lu Yang	Deng Chao, Dong Zijian, Lei Jiayin, Wang Shengdi, Ding Chengxin, Wang Yanlin	Action fantasy	
O C T O B E R	1	The Return of The Lame Hero	Tong Zhijian	Wang Anyu, Zhang Tian'ai, Wang Yanlin, Nie Yuan	Crime drama	
O C T O B E R	4	Sound of Silence	Wan Li	Tan Jianci, Lan Xiya, Wang Ge, Wang Yanhui	Crime drama	
O C T O B E R	25	After Typhoon	Li Yu	Zhang Zifeng, Zhang Weili, Angelica Lee, Yao Chen	Drama	
N O V E M B E R	1	Girl	Shu Qi	Roy Chiu, 9m88, Bai Xiao-Ying, Audrey Lin	Drama	
N O V E M B E R	7	The Sun Rises on Us All	Cai Shangjun	Xin Zhilei, Zhang Songwen, Feng Shaofeng	Drama	
N O V E M B E R	15	Family At Large	Bo Kang	Hu Ge, Wen Qi, Gao Ziqi, Yan Ni, Song Jia, Gao Ye, Ou Hao	Crime drama	
N O V E M B E R	22	Resurrection	Bi Gan	Jackson Yee, Shu Qi	Science fiction	
D E C E M B E R	6	Gezhi Town	Kong Sheng	Xiao Zhan, Peng Yuchang, Zhou Yiran	War drama	
D E C E M B E R	31	Escape From The Outland	Shen Ao	Xiao Yang, Qi Xi, Simon Yam, Zheng Kai	War drama	
D E C E M B E R	31	The Fire Raven	Sam Quah	Peng Yuchang, Ning Chang, Huang Xiaoming	Crime thriller	
