= List of Chinese films of 2019 =

The following is a list of mainland Chinese films first released in year 2019.

== Box office ==
These are the top 10 grossing Chinese films that were released in China in 2019:

Highest-grossing domestic films of 2019 in China
Rank	Title	Domestic gross
1	Ne Zha	$710,400,000
2	The Wandering Earth	$663,400,000
3	My People, My Country	$452,600,000
4	The Captain	$407,800,000
5	Crazy Alien	$313,100,000
6	Pegasus	$243,700,000
7	The Bravest	$240,800,000
8	Better Days	$220,400,000
9	Sheep Without a Shepherd	$191,602,146
10	The White Storm 2 - Drug Lords	$184,800,000

== Films released ==
=== January–March ===
Opening		Title	Director	Cast	Notes	Ref.
J A N U A R Y	4	Four Springs	Lu Qingyi	Lu Yunkun, Li Guixian	Entered into the 2018 FIRST Youth Film Festival	
J A N U A R Y	4	Kung Fu Rescue				
J A N U A R Y	4	Manipulated				
J A N U A R Y	8	Feng Kuang De Qi Yue				
J A N U A R Y	8	Lucky to Meet You				
J A N U A R Y	8	Silence Snow				
J A N U A R Y	9	Business on WeChat				
J A N U A R Y	9	Grace of Porridge				
J A N U A R Y	11	The Big Shot	Guo Shubo	Wang Qianyuan, Bao Bei'er, Wang Xun		
J A N U A R Y	11	The Business Strom of Ruhai				
J A N U A R Y	11	I'll Complete For the Top				
J A N U A R Y	11	The Forest Monster				
J A N U A R Y	11	Only Love Can Do This to Me				
J A N U A R Y	11	Reverse the Life				
J A N U A R Y	11	Rural Summer Vacation				
J A N U A R Y	11	Save Your Soul				
J A N U A R Y	11	Starups	Guan Xiu, Xiao Qinan	Luo Yonghao, Dai Wei, Zhang Ying		
J A N U A R Y	11	White Snake	Huang Jiakang; Zhao Ji	Zhang Zhe, Yang Tianxiang, Tang Xiaoxi	Mainland-United States co-production	
J A N U A R Y	16	Parkour Courier	Wang Hu	Wan Guopeng, Gong Mi, Lü Liping		
J A N U A R Y	18	Champa Flower			Mainland-Laos co-production	
J A N U A R Y	18	Dragon Force-Rise of Ultraman				
J A N U A R Y	18	A Home with a View	Herman Yau	Francis Ng, Louis Koo, Anita Yuen	Mainland-Hong Kong co-production	
J A N U A R Y	20	Inferior Student Qiao Xi				
J A N U A R Y	24	How I Became Russian			Mainland-Russia co-production	
J A N U A R Y	25	Dead Pigs			Mainland-United States-Hong Kong co-production	
J A N U A R Y	25	The Great Detective	Roy Chow	Han Geng, Yin Zheng, Zhang Huiwen		
J A N U A R Y	25	Reverse the Life				
J A N U A R Y	25	Young Female Warrior				
J A N U A R Y	29	The Fatal Love				
J A N U A R Y	30	Let's Go Home				
J A N U A R Y	31	Dating Times				
J A N U A R Y	31	Jane Eyre				
F E B R U A R Y	5	Boonie Bears: Blast Into The Past	Ding Liang; Lin Huida	Zhang Wei, Zhang Bingjun, Tan Xiao		
F E B R U A R Y	5	Crazy Alien	Ning Hao	Huang Bo, Shen Teng, Matthew Morrison		
F E B R U A R Y	5	Integrity	Alan Mak	Sean Lau, Nick Cheung, Karena Lam	Mainland-Hong Kong co-production	
F E B R U A R Y	5	The Knight of Shadows: Between Yin and Yang	Yan Jia	Jackie Chan, Ethan Juan, Elane Zhong		
F E B R U A R Y	5	The New King of Comedy	Stephen Chow	Wang Baoqiang, E Jingwen, Zhang Quandan		
F E B R U A R Y	5	Pegasus	Han Han	Shen Teng, Huang Jingyu, Yin Zheng		
F E B R U A R Y	5	Peppa Celebrates Chinese New Year	Zhang Dapeng; Neville Astley; Mark Baker; Joris van Hulzen; Sarah Roper	Zhu Yawen, Liu Yun, Gua Ah-leh	Mainland-United Kingdom co-production	
F E B R U A R Y	5	The Wandering Earth	Frant Gwo	Qu Chuxiao, Wu Jing, Li Guangjie		
F E B R U A R Y	14	Autumn Fairy Tale				
F E B R U A R Y	14	Fall in Love at First Kiss	Chen Yu-shan	Darren Wang, Lin Yun, Kenji Chen		
F E B R U A R Y	14	Love in 50 Meters				
F E B R U A R Y	16	Snow Indicates Harvest				
F E B R U A R Y	22	The Ghost in Well				
F E B R U A R Y	26	Three Changes, Mountain Changes				
M A R C H	1	Unforgivable Sin				
M A R C H	8	At Two Thirty				
M A R C H	8	The Awakening Calling from Love				
M A R C H	8	Battle of Ao Lun Prague				
M A R C H	8	Chasing News				
M A R C H	8	Dai Wo Hui Jia				
M A R C H	8	Love You				
M A R C H	8	Once Upon a Time in China				
M A R C H	15	The Crossing	Bai Xue	Huang Yao, Sun Yang, Carmen Tong	Entered into the 2018 Toronto International Film Festival	
M A R C H	15	On the Balcony	Zhang Meng	Zhou Dongyu, Wang Qiang, Cao Rui		
M A R C H	22	Song of Youth	Zhang Luan	Yu Qian, Melody Tang, Wang Guangyuan		
M A R C H	29	Doomed				
M A R C H	29	The Human Comedy	Sun Zhou	Allen, Wang Zhi, Lu Nuo		
M A R C H	29	Those Years We Have Traveled Together				

=== April–June ===
Opening		Title	Director	Cast	Notes	Ref.
A P R I L	4	A Test of Love Adventure			Entered into the 2017 Pingyao International Film Festival	
A P R I L	4	Funeral Vigil			Entered into the 2017 Shanghai International Film Festival	
A P R I L	4	P Storm	David Lam	Louis Koo, Kevin Cheng, Raymond Lam	Mainland-Hong Kong co-production	
A P R I L	4	The Shadow Play	Lou Ye	Jing Boran, Song Jia, Ma Sichun, Qin Hao, Michelle Chen	Entered into the 55th Golden Horse Awards	
A P R I L	5	The Chief Legend				
A P R I L	5	Four Warriors:The Underworld				
A P R I L	5	Frog Prince Adventures				
A P R I L	5	Into the Rainbow			Entered into the 2017 TIFF Kids	
A P R I L	11	Beyond Belief			Entered into the 8th Beijing International Film Festival	
A P R I L	12	Breeze on the Lingding Ocean				
A P R I L	12	Exceptionally Gifted Girl				
A P R I L	12	The Game of Desire				
A P R I L	12	Kill My Brother			Entered into the 2018 Hundred Flowers Awards	
A P R I L	12	Love is the Sunshine			Entered into the 2018 Pingyao International Film Festival	
A P R I L	12	My Dear Elephant				
A P R I L	12	Wish You Were Here	Kenneth Bi	Faye Yu, Takao Osawa, Ayane Kinoshita	Mainland-Japan co-production	
A P R I L	16	Shi Shen Ba Jie	Zheng Ruohang			
A P R I L	18	Change of Gangster	Francis Ng	Francis Ng, Qiao Shan, Wen Song	Mainland-Hong Kong co-production	
A P R I L	18	Lost in Love	Huo Jianqi	Chen Xiao, Du Juan, Jevon Wang		
A P R I L	18	My Name is Wei He				
A P R I L	19	The Big Dipper				
A P R I L	19	Hello, Beijing				
A P R I L	19	The Road to Hippie				
A P R I L	20	Push and Shove				
A P R I L	26	Jinpa			Entered into the 75th Venice International Film Festival	
A P R I L	26	Out of Crimes			Entered into the Warsaw International Film Festival	
A P R I L	27	Haimen Depths				
M A Y	1	Always Miss You	Chen Hung-i	Amber Kuo, Zheng Kai, Ethan Li	Mainland-Taiwan co-production	
M A Y	10	Enter the Forbidden City	Hu Mei	Ma Yili, Fu Dalong, Ma Jinghan	Entered into the 2018 Shanghai International Film Festival	
M A Y	14	Girls Always Happy	Yang Mingming	Nai An, Zhang Xianmin, Yang Mingming	Entered into the 68th Berlin International Film Festival	
M A Y	18	Twins	Jin Zhencheng	Liu Haoran, Chen Duling, Zhao Rui		
J U N E	6	Chasing the Dragon II: Wild Wild Bunch	Wong Jing; Jason Kwan	Tony Leung Ka-fai, Louis Koo, Gordon Lam	Mainland-Hong Kong co-production	
J U N E	6	My Best Summer	Zhang Disha	Chen Feiyu, He Lan, Kara Wai		
J U N E	6	Our Infinite Further	Chen Jing; Lou Yi	Liu Qiushi, Liu Yichang, He Zhuoyan		

=== July–September ===
Opening		Title	Director	Cast	Notes	Ref.
J U L Y	5	The White Storm 2 - Drug Lords	Herman Yau	Andy Lau, Louis Koo, Michael Miu, Karena Lam, Chrissie Chau	Mainland-Hong Kong co-production	
J U L Y	12	The Rookies	Alan Yuen	Darren Wang, Sandrine Pinna, Milla Jovovich, Xu Weizhou, Liu Meitong		
J U L Y	18	Looking Up	Deng Chao; Yu Baimei	Deng Chao, Bai Yu, Ren Suxi		
J U L Y	26	Ne Zha	Yu Yang	Lu Yanting		
A U G U S T	1	The Bravest	Tony Chan	Huang Xiaoming, Du Jiang, Tan Zhuo		
A U G U S T	7	Line Walker 2: Invisible Spy	Jazz Boon	Nick Cheung, Louis Koo, Francis Ng, Jiang Peiyao, Zhang Yichi	Mainland-Hong Kong co-production	
A U G U S T	16	Bodies at Rest	Renny Harlin	Nick Cheung, Yang Zi, Richie Jen	Mainland-Hong Kong co-production	
A U G U S T	16	The King's Avatar: For the Glory				
A U G U S T	16	Send Me to the Clouds	Teng Congcong	Yao Chen, Yuan Hong, Li Jiuxiao		
A U G U S T	16	Viy 2: Journey to China	Oleg Stepchenko	Jackie Chan, Arnold Schwarzenegger, Jason Flemyng, Yao Xingtong, Ma Li	Mainland-Russia co-production	
S E P T E M B E R	7	The Legend of Hei	MTJJ	Shan Xin, Hao Xianghai, Liu Mingyue		
S E P T E M B E R	12	The Last Wish	Tian Yusheng	Peng Yuchang, Wang Talu, Wei Daxun		
S E P T E M B E R	13	Jade Dynasty	Ching Siu-tung	Xiao Zhan, Li Qin, Meng Meiqi, Tang Yixin		
S E P T E M B E R	30	The Captain	Andrew Lau	Zhang Hanyu, Oho Ou, Du Jiang		
S E P T E M B E R	30	The Climbers	Daniel Lee	Wu Jing, Zhang Ziyi, Zhang Yi		
S E P T E M B E R	30	My People, My Country		Huang Bo, Zhang Yi, Han Haolin		

=== October–December ===
Opening		Title	Director	Cast	Notes	Ref.
O C T O B E R	18	Father and Hero	Shao Yafeng	Jiang Wu, Shao Bing, Yao Rao	Entered into the 2018 Shanghai International Film Festival	
O C T O B E R	25	Better Days	Derek Tsang	Zhou Dongyu, Jackson Yee, Zhou Ye		
D E C E M B E R	6	The Wild Goose Lake	Diao Yinan	Hu Ge, Gwei Lun-mei, Liao Fan		
D E C E M B E R	12	Skyfire	Simon West	Wang Xueqi, Hannah Quinlivan, Shawn Dou, Jason Isaacs		
D E C E M B E R	13	Sheep Without a Shepherd	Sam Quah	Xiao Yang, Tan Zhuo, Joan Chen		
D E C E M B E R	20	Only Cloud Knows	Feng Xiaogang	Huang Xuan, Yang Caiyu, Xu Fan		

== See also ==
- List of Chinese films of 2018
- List of Chinese films of 2020
