= Wang Ju =

Wang Ju may refer to:

- Gyeongjong of Goryeo (955–981), king of Goryeo
- Naomi Wang (born 1992), Chinese singer
