= Caught in Time =

2020 Hong Kong-Chinese film by Lau Ho-leung

- Original promotional poster
- Simplified Chinese: 除暴
- Literal meaning: eliminate the violent criminals
- Hanyu Pinyin: chúbào
- Directed by: Lau Ho-Leung (劉浩良)
- Screenplay by: Lau Ho-Leung; Liang Hong (洪亮)
- Produced by: Han Sanping
- Starring: Wang Qianyuan; Daniel Wu; Jessie Li; Michelle Wai
- Cinematography: Pakie Chan
- Edited by: J. Him Lee; James Cheung Kwan-Wah; Lau Ho-Leung
- Music by: Lam Kwan-Fai; Julian Chan
- Production companies: Emperor Motion Pictures; Lian Ray Pictures 正夫影业
- Distributed by: Emperor Motion Pictures
- Release date: 20 November 2020
- Running time: 95 minutes
- Countries: Hong Kong; China
- Language: Mandarin
- Box office: RMB 538 million, US$80,620,075

Caught in Time (Chinese: 除暴) is a 2020 crime action film based on the robber and serial killer Zhang Jun. It is the second film from director Lau Ho-Leung, after Two Thumbs Up. It stars Wang Qianyuan, Daniel Wu, Jessie Li, and Michelle Wai.

== Plot ==
Set in southern China in the 1990s, the film follows detective Zhong Cheng as he tracks the "Eagle Gang", a sophisticated, well-trained, and ruthless group of robbers led by gangster Zhang Sun (codename "Falcon"), over the course of years. The gang members commit a series of horrendous crimes, and Zhang Sun taunts the detective by pulling down his mask to show his face. A cat-and-mouse game ensues as Zhong Cheng works to find the gang. The chase ends with a shirtless battle between Zhong Cheng and Zhang Sun in a bathhouse.

The film is based on a real string of robberies and murders committed by Zhang Jun, who was dubbed "China's number one outlaw" when he was active in the 1990s. Zhang Jun killed or injured around 50 people before being apprehended in September 2000 and executed the next year.

== Cast ==
- Wang Qianyuan as Zhong Cheng
- Daniel Wu as Zhang Sun
- Jessie Li as Wen Juan
- Michelle Wai as Chen Qian
- Nina Paw as Zhang Sun's mother

== Production ==
Production officially started on 13 November 2018 in Jiangmen, Guangdong, and principal photography was finished in January 2019. Filming locations included Heshan, Jiangmen, and Zhongshan, Guangdong. Reportedly, Wang Qianyuan and Daniel Wu nearly injured themselves trying to make the action as realistic as possible. Wang also said in an interview that in preparation for the shirtless fight scene at the end of the film, he and Wu spent 40 days on a diet and exercise regimen to tone their muscles. Michelle Wai started getting tanned and gaining weight about six months before shooting began in preparation for her role as a 1990s police officer. The production used a total of 48 guns, 6,243 blank cartridges, and 4,312 explosive cartridges.

The film's working title was 限期破案; Xiànqī Pò'àn, literally "Solving the case in time", but in September 2020 the title was changed to 除暴; Chúbào, literally "Getting rid of outlaws", in support of the ongoing law enforcement campaign to crack down on underworld crimes.

== Release and reception ==
Though originally planned for a 2019 release, the film was released in China on 20 November 2020, after screenings on 14 and 15 November. Screening audiences rated it 8.8 out of 10 on Taopiaopiao and Maoyan. Among their reactions were sentiments like "Now I understand why China is one of the safest countries in the world nowadays" and "Being a police officer back then was really tough". It was also released in Australia on 10 December 2020.

The weekend of its release, Caught in Time was the top-grossing film internationally. It was the box office number-one film in China for weeks 47–48 of 2020.

It received mixed reviews. Jiemian News wrote that the film was bold and innovative for adapting the style of classic Hong Kong crime films to the context of mainland China, but noted that not all viewers were pleased with this choice. Critic Dong Jing said that after an exciting first half, the second half of the film was disappointing and Zhong Cheng's character was not developed enough, but she still felt the film was worth watching. The film was praised for its detailed recreation of 1990s China.

Viewers enjoyed the final fight scene in the bathhouse. While commentators praised the realistic punches, they also joked that the men kept their towels on improbably well. "Daniel Wu's towel never falls off even when he fights" became one of the top searches on Weibo.

== Sequel ==
On 3 December 2020, a sequel was announced. Caught in Time 2 will feature the same cast, and director Lau Ho-Leung is writing the screenplay.
