= Dead to Rights (film) =

2025 film directed by Shen Ao

- Theatrical release poster
- Traditional Chinese: 南京照相舘
- Simplified Chinese: 南京照相馆
- Literal meaning: Nanjing Photo Studio
- Hanyu Pinyin: Nánjīng zhàoxiàng guǎn
- Directed by: Shen Ao
- Written by: Xu Luyang; Zhang Ke; Shen Ao
- Produced by: Fu Ruoqing
- Starring: Liu Haoran; Wang Chuanjun; Gao Ye; Wang Xiao; Zhou You; Yang Enyou; Daichi Harashima
- Cinematography: Cao Yu
- Edited by: Zhang Yifan
- Music by: Peng Fei
- Production companies: China Film Group; Omnijoi Media Corporation
- Distributed by: China Film Group
- Release date: 25 July 2025
- Running time: 137 minutes
- Country: China
- Languages: Mandarin; Japanese; English
- Budget: US$20 million
- Box office: US$381 million

Dead to Rights (simplified Chinese: 南京照相馆; traditional Chinese: 南京照相舘; lit. 'Nanjing Photographic Studio') is a 2025 Chinese historical drama film directed by Shen Ao. It stars Liu Haoran, Wang Chuanjun, Gao Ye, Wang Xiao, Zhou You, Yang Enyou, and Daichi Harashima. Set during the Nanjing Massacre, the film follows a group of civilians who seek refuge in a photographic studio amidst widespread brutality, who manage to expose the atrocities committed by the Imperial Japanese Army.

Dead to Rights was released on 25 July 2025. It went on to make US$381 million at the box office, making it the third-highest-grossing Chinese film of 2025. It was selected as the Chinese entry for Best International Feature Film at the 98th Academy Awards, but it was not selected for nomination.

== Plot ==
During the occupation of Nanjing in the Second Sino-Japanese War, the Japanese army commits widespread atrocities including massacres, rapes, and looting. They make quisling interpreter Wang Guanghai help them control the city in exchange for passes to leave Nanjing for his family. Though married, he has an affair with opera actress Lin Yuxiu, who performs for the Japanese military to survive. Wang works to get Lin an extra pass. Japanese military photographer Hideo Itō is assigned to document the occupation for propaganda. When Major Kuroshima orders him to execute a man to prove that he is a real soldier, Itō discovers postman Ah Chang and asks if he is a photo developer. Chang lies to save himself, leading Itō to a nearby photographic studio. Itō gives Chang one day to develop his film rolls, with Wang interpreting.

Chang finds the studio's owner, Jin Chengzong and his family hiding inside. He convinces Chang to help develop the photos to avoid suspicion. Chang initially runs to the city exits but returns after witnessing soldiers killing escapees. The next day, after Jin and Chang develop the photos, Itō challenges Chang to develop negatives in front of him. He opens the darkroom door midway, ruining the photos to Chang's dismay. Itō dismisses Chang by saying that the photos of Chinese "don't matter".

As Chang wins Itō's trust, Wang claims Lin as Chang's wife in order to secure another pass. Itō agrees, and Wang brings Lin to the studio to live together with Chang, strengthening the ruse. Lin was saved from the Japanese, who threatened to strip her naked during a performance, by a hiding soldier, Song Cunyi. She secretly smuggles Song to the photo studio with her. The group decides to cooperate, with Chang and Jin developing negatives to maintain Chang's facade in exchange for food and relative safety. The developed films reveal staged propaganda of Japanese-Chinese cooperation, but images of brutal atrocities are also developed. Song learns from one of the photos that his brother was executed. The atrocity images are hidden by the group. Colonel Inoue, Itō's commander, tells him to collect the photos as a tool to terrorize the Chinese should the war continue.

As Inoue questions why images of their atrocities are allowed to be developed by a Chinese person, Lieutenant Ikeda is sent with Japanese equipment to help develop Itō's negatives, replacing Chang. Song martyrs himself by killing Ikeda during an outing. Itō figures out how to develop photos himself and is tasked with killing Chang. Unwilling to face Chang personally, Itō instead gives him the promised passes. Chang's group agrees to let Jin's wife Zhao Yifang and young daughter Wanyi obtain the passes. At the gate, the two are bayoneted by guards ordered by Itō to kill whoever carried those passes.

Wang pleads with Lin to leave the studio as Itō and Kuroshima arrive, furious about Chang's ruse. Itō shoots a resisting Wang as Kuroshima attempts to rape Lin. Jin kills Kuroshima and splashes acid over Itō's face. On Wang's body the group finds the passes of Wang's family, who were killed in a previous massacre. They assign them to Jin and Lin, who hide Jin's infant son in a bag. Chang burns what is purportedly Itō's negatives as a distraction, allowing the others to flee, though Itō saves them and kills Chang as soldiers surround the building and fire burns down the studio.

At the city gates, Jin’s son starts crying, forcing Jin to sacrifice himself to distract the guards with his camera as Lin and his son reach the Nanjing Safety Zone, allowing Lin and the baby to survive with Itō's original atrocity negatives sewn into their clothes, while Itō's rolls were replaced with negatives of Nanjing residents, photos he disregarded. A montage shows the gruesome fates of those residents, including Song and Chang, with Chang defying Itō as he dies. The photos are disseminated globally, sparking international outrage. Humiliated, Itō is forced to commit seppuku, and his death is framed heroically by Inoue.

Post-war, the massacre's perpetrators, including Inoue and Hisao Tani, are tried in Nanjing for war crimes, with the smuggled images as irrefutable evidence. Lin, raising Jin's son, photographs the public executions of the war criminals as their fellow Chinese and the spirits of massacre victims observe, which include Jin, his family, Song and Chang.

During the end credits, a hand holds out pictures taken during the massacre in front of their locations in modern-day Nanjing.

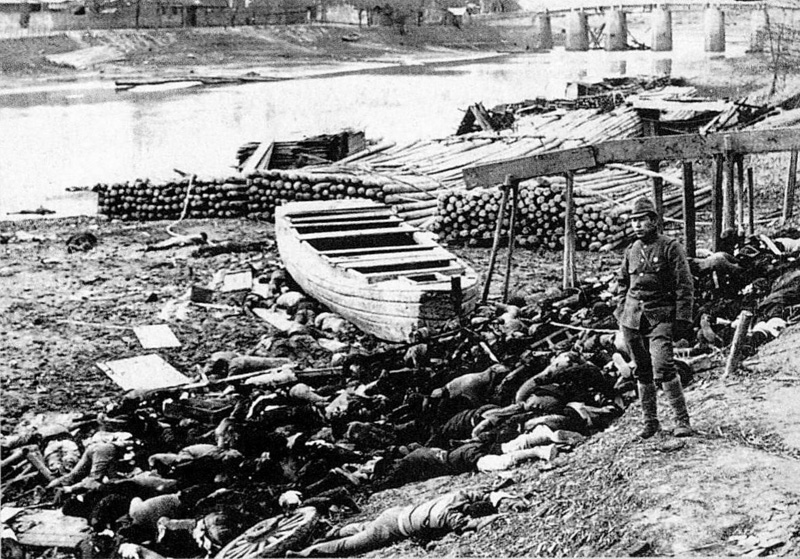
Civilian massacres are shown in the film.

== Cast ==
- Liu Haoran as Su Liuchang ("Ah Chang"), a postman taking refuge in a photography studio during the Nanjing Massacre.
- Wang Chuanjun as Wang Guanghai, a collaborating interpreter trying to secure passes out of Nanjing for him, his family and his lover Lin Yuxiu.
- Daichi Harashima (原島 大地) as Hideo Itō (伊藤秀夫), an Imperial Japanese Army photographer and soldier sent to obtain images for propaganda.
- Gao Ye as Lin Yuxiu, a singer and actress with whom Wang Guanghai has an affair.
- Wang Xiao as Jin Chengzong, the owner of the photography studio in which Ah Chang and Lin take refuge.
- Zhou You as Song Cunyi, a Nanjing police officer pressed into military service.
- Yang Enyou as Jin Wanyi, Chengzong's young daughter with Zhao Yifang.
- Wang Zhen'er as Zhao Yifang, Chengzong's wife.

== Background ==
The photography studio depicted in the film is based on the Huadong Photo Studio, historically located near today's Guyilang area in Nanjing. Luo Jin, an apprentice at the studio, discovered negatives containing images of atrocities committed by Japanese soldiers when developing film sent by Japanese officers in early 1938. Risking his life, Luo developed these negatives and compiled them into an album. Due to hardship, Luo later joined a communications training team affiliated with Wang Jingwei's collaborationist government's guard brigade stationed at Pilu Temple, where he hid the album in a restroom. In 1941, the album was discovered and secretly preserved by Wu Liankai, who was undergoing training at the same temple.

In 1946, after Japan's surrender, Wu Liankai, who by then had changed his name to Wu Xuan, learned that the Nanjing Provisional Senate was gathering evidence for the Nanjing War Crimes Tribunal to prosecute war criminals. He submitted the hidden photo album, which became crucial evidence for the conviction of General Hisao Tani, one of the principal perpetrators of the Nanjing Massacre. The album is currently preserved at the Second Historical Archives of China.

== Production ==
A documentary about the film by China News Service in Chinese.

In 2023, director Shen Ao, inspired by a discussion with Zhang Ke (screenwriter of the film The Volunteers: To the War) and revisiting Nanjing Film Studio's 1987 production Massacre in Nanjing, decided it was essential to "retell this story in our times". Shen then contacted Nanjing Film Studio, the rights holder of Massacre in Nanjing, and acquired the adaptation rights, initiating extensive research into the historical event of "smuggling photographic evidence out of Nanjing" to form the foundation of the new film. While his previous film, No More Bets (2023), was still fresh in public memory, Shen immediately assembled his creative team to start production on Dead to Rights.

== Release ==
Dead to Rights was jointly produced by China Film Group and several other studios. Initially scheduled for release on August 2, 2025, the date was later moved up to July 25, with nationwide previews conducted on July 19–20. By July 20, earnings from previews and advance ticket sales exceeded ¥30 million. After its official release, the film's single-day box office surpassed ¥100 million on July 26. By 8 p.m. on July 28, four days into its official release, the film's total box office had surpassed ¥500 million.

The film was released in the US and Canada on August 15.

The film was rated 100% on Rotten Tomatoes based on 11 reviews.

== See also ==
- List of submissions to the 98th Academy Awards for Best International Feature Film
- List of Chinese submissions for the Academy Award for Best International Feature Film
