= Old Boys (2010 film) =

- Short film poster
- Directed by: Xiao Yang
- Written by: Xiao Yang
- Produced by: Han Sanping
- Starring: Xiao Yang; Wang Taili
- Production company: Youku Original
- Distributed by: Youku
- Release date: 28 October 2010
- Running time: 42 minutes
- Country: China
- Language: Mandarin

Old Boys (Chinese: 11度青春之《老男孩》) is a Chinese short comedy film directed by Xiao Yang. It became popular via the Internet. A drama adaption of the film has been announced recently.

== Plot ==
Xiao Dabao and Wang Xiaoshuai, two boys, used to be good friends in their childhood, because they were both crazy about Michael Jackson and have both been rejected by the most beautiful girl in school. Once they had grown up, neither of them was rich or living a very comfortable life. After learning about the death of Michael Jackson, they decided to take part in a singing competition. They performed a song called "Old Boys," which contained their old memories. Unfortunately, they failed the competition once they reached the top 50. However, their performance touched the judges and a lot of the audience. Taking part in the competition ended up being an important new experience in their lives.

== Cast ==
- Xiao Yang as Xiao Dabao
- Wang taili as Wang Xiaoshuai
- Yu Peipei as school beauty
- Han Qiuchi as Bao Xiaobai

== Music ==
Old Boys The song which is performed by the two boys in the singing competition. This is also the theme song of this film. Author: Wang Taili Composer: Takuya Ohashi Singer: Chopsticks Brothers

- "Old Boys" (Chopsticks brothers)
- "Billie Jean" (Michael Jackson)
- "Thriller" (Michael Jackson)
- "Earth Song" (Michael Jackson)
- "Childhood" (Michael Jackson)
- "sixteen-year-old" (Yang Peiguo)
- "Xiao Fang" (Li Chunbo)
- "pink memory" (Han Baoyi)
- "sailor" (Zheng Zhihua)
- "happy birthday" (Xie Na)
- "Hana no Ko Lunlun" (Mitsuko Horie)
