= List of 2019 box office number-one films in China =

The following is a list of 2019 box office number-one films in China.

== Number-one films ==
†	This implies the highest-grossing movie of the year.

#	Date	Film	Gross	Notes
1	6 January 2019	Bumblebee	US$57,917,589	
2	13 January 2019	Bumblebee	US$26,325,802	
3	20 January 2019	Bumblebee	US$16,278,902	
4	27 January 2019	Once Upon a Deadpool	US$22,118,682	
5	3 February 2019	White Snake	US$8,619,664	
6	10 February 2019	The Wandering Earth	US$179,892,945	
7	17 February 2019	The Wandering Earth	US$89,425,123	
8	24 February 2019	Alita: Battle Angel	US$63,793,482	
9	3 March 2019	How to Train Your Dragon: The Hidden World	US$32,283,938	
10	10 March 2019	Captain Marvel	US$86,376,752	
11	17 March 2019	More than Blue	US$46,390,917	
12	24 March 2019	More than Blue	US$27,026,525	
13	31 March 2019	Song of Youth	US$11,754,458	
14	7 April 2019	P Storm	US$39,798,089	
15	14 April 2019	P Storm	US$18,525,867	
16	21 April 2019	P Storm	US$11,365,010	
17	28 April 2019	Avengers: Endgame	US$175,961,330	
18	5 May 2019	Avengers: Endgame	US$64,428,735	
19	12 May 2019	Detective Pikachu	US$39,879,448	
20	19 May 2019	Detective Pikachu	US$17,652,626	
21	26 May 2019	Aladdin	US$18,598,690	
22	2 June 2019	Godzilla: King of the Monsters	US$66,156,539	
23	9 June 2019	Dark Phoenix	US$31,855,249	
24	16 June 2019	Men in Black: International	US$25,274,565	
25	23 June 2019	Spirited Away	US$27,842,673	
26	30 June 2019	Spider-Man: Far From Home	US$95,044,125	
27	7 July 2019	The White Storm 2 - Drug Lords	US$60,429,427	
28	14 July 2019	The Lion King	US$54,182,944	
29	21 July 2019	Looking Up	US$38,882,507	
30	28 July 2019	Ne Zha †	US$94,948,797	
31	4 August 2019	Ne Zha †	US$126,835,170	
32	11 August 2019	Ne Zha †	US$66,832,675	
33	18 August 2019	Ne Zha †	US$40,971,815	
34	25 August 2019	Hobbs & Shaw	US$94,938,990	
35	1 September 2019	Hobbs & Shaw	US$26,227,779	
36	8 September 2019	The Legend of Hei	US$11,665,322	
37	15 September 2019	Jade Dynasty	US$38,281,436	
38	22 September 2019	Friend Zone	US$3,194,108	
39	29 September 2019	The Captain	US$7,920,030	
40	6 October 2019	The Captain	US$102,353,091	
41	13 October 2019	The Captain	US$34,934,097	
42	20 October 2019	Maleficent: Mistress of Evil	US$22,504,215	
43	27 October 2019	Better Days	US$82,199,097	
44	3 November 2019	Better Days	US$42,493,247	
45	10 November 2019	Better Days	US$18,620,481	
46	17 November 2019	Da Yue Zai Dong Ji	US$12,999,558	
47	24 November 2019	Frozen 2	US$52,878,479	
48	1 December 2019	Frozen 2	US$26,766,399	
49	8 December 2019	Jumanji: The Next Level	US$24,947,049	
50	15 December 2019	Sheep Without a Shepherd	US$29,070,549	
51	22 December 2019	Ip Man 4: The Finale	US$46,092,871	
52	29 December 2019	Ip Man 4: The Finale	US$24,103,063	

== See also ==
- List of Chinese films of 2019
