= List of 2020 box office number-one films in China =

This is a list of films which placed number-one at the weekend box office in China during 2020.

== Number-one films ==
†	This implies the highest-grossing movie of the year.

#	Date	Film	Gross
1	5 January 2020	Adoring	US$16,947,763
2	12 January 2020	Adoring	US$8,899,107
3	19 January 2020	Sheep Without a Shepherd	US$7,987,492
4	26 January 2020	Spies in Disguise	US$36,617
5	2 February 2020	Knives Out	US$21,601
6	9 February 2020	Fighting with My Family	US$3,956
7	16 February 2020	Box office closed due to the COVID-19 pandemic.	
8	23 February 2020	Box office closed due to the COVID-19 pandemic.	
9	1 March 2020	Box office closed due to the COVID-19 pandemic.	
10	8 March 2020	Box office closed due to the COVID-19 pandemic.	
11	15 March 2020	Box office closed due to the COVID-19 pandemic.	
12	22 March 2020	Box office closed due to the COVID-19 pandemic.	
13	29 March 2020	Box office closed due to the COVID-19 pandemic.	
14	5 April 2020	Box office closed due to the COVID-19 pandemic.	
15	12 April 2020	Box office closed due to the COVID-19 pandemic.	
16	19 April 2020	Box office closed due to the COVID-19 pandemic.	
17	26 April 2020	Box office closed due to the COVID-19 pandemic.	
18	3 May 2020	Box office closed due to the COVID-19 pandemic.	
19	10 May 2020	Box office closed due to the COVID-19 pandemic.	
20	17 May 2020	Box office closed due to the COVID-19 pandemic.	
21	24 May 2020	Box office closed due to the COVID-19 pandemic.	
22	31 May 2020	Box office closed due to the COVID-19 pandemic.	
23	7 June 2020	Box office closed due to the COVID-19 pandemic.	
24	14 June 2020	Box office closed due to the COVID-19 pandemic.	
25	21 June 2020	Box office closed due to the COVID-19 pandemic.	
26	28 June 2020	Box office closed due to the COVID-19 pandemic.	
27	5 July 2020	Box office closed due to the COVID-19 pandemic.	
28	12 July 2020	Box office closed due to the COVID-19 pandemic.	
29	19 July 2020	Box office closed due to the COVID-19 pandemic.	
30	26 July 2020	Dolittle	US$5,141,737
31	2 August 2020	Dolittle	US$3,320,748
32	9 August 2020	1917	US$5,260,684
33	16 August 2020	Harry Potter and the Philosopher's Stone	US$13,650,000
34	23 August 2020	The Eight Hundred †	US$8,260,000
35	30 August 2020	The Eight Hundred †	US$161,000,000
36	6 September 2020	The Eight Hundred †	US$34,000,000
37	13 September 2020	Mulan	US$23,040,492
38	20 September 2020	The Eight Hundred †	US$17,700,000
39	27 September 2020	Leap	US$24,600,000
40	4 October 2020	My People, My Homeland	US$157,500,000
41	11 October 2020	My People, My Homeland	US$42,000,000
42	18 October 2020	My People, My Homeland	US$19,100,000
43	25 October 2020	The Sacrifice	US$53,000,000
44	1 November 2020	The Sacrifice	US$28,600,000
45	8 November 2020	The Sacrifice	US$14,400,000
46	15 November 2020	The Sacrifice	US$9,200,000
47	22 November 2020	Caught in Time	US$31,000,000
48	29 November 2020	Caught in Time	US$13,700,000
49	6 December 2020	The End of Endless Love	US$22,600,000
50	13 December 2020	Bath Buddy	US$28,700,000
51	20 December 2020	The Rescue	US$35,000,000
52	27 December 2020	Shock Wave 2	US$63,800,000

== See also ==
- List of Chinese films of 2020
