= Shen Ao =

Chinese film director

- 申奥
- Born: 11 September 1986 (age 40); Yanbian, Jilin, China
- Education: Beijing Film Academy
- Occupations: Film director and screenwriter
- Notable work: No More Bets; Dead to Rights

Chinese name
- Simplified Chinese: 申奥
Transcriptions
Standard Mandarin
- Hanyu Pinyin: Shēn Ào

Chinese Korean name
- Chosŏn'gŭl: 신오
Transcriptions
- Revised Romanization: Sin O

Shen Ao (Chinese: 申奥; pinyin: Shēn Ào, Korean: 신오; 11 September 1986) is a Chinese filmmaker, known for directing No More Bets (2023) and Dead to Rights (2025).

== Early life ==
Of Korean ethnicity, Shen was born on 11 September 1986 in the Yanbian Korean Autonomous Prefecture, in Jilin, China. During his childhood, he moved with his parents to Beijing, where he was raised. His mother worked at the Institute of Mathematics at the Chinese Academy of Sciences, and through her, Shen was exposed to many mathematicians from an early age. He also studied Olympiad mathematics as a child. In the 1990s, his father worked in advertising for a period, introducing Shen to the film and television advertising industry.

In 2009, Shen graduated from the Directing Department of the Beijing Film Academy. His graduation project was the short film The Opposite Shore (2009). After graduation, he worked as a commercial director for nearly a decade. During this period, he met director Ning Hao on the set of a television commercial, where Shen was serving as the commercial's executive director. In 2016, when Ning's Dirty Monkey Pictures launched the "72 Transformations Film Project" to support emerging filmmakers, Shen became one of the new directors signed under the initiative.

== Career ==
In 2019, his first film, My Dear Liar, produced by Ning Hao, focused on insurance fraud. It won the Best First Feature award at the 33rd Golden Rooster Awards. In 2023, the anti-fraud film No More Bets, also produced by Ning Hao, grossed a record 3.849 billion yuan.

In 2025, he directed and wrote the film Dead to Rights, which was based on the Nanjing Massacre during the Second Sino-Japanese War. It was released during the summer of 2025 and received positive reviews, and grossed 3.017 billion yuan in box office. Shen was selected as the cover figure of 2025 China Newsweek. He directed and wrote Escape from the Outland, which was released at the end of 2025 and focuses on overseas hostage taking.

== Filmography ==
=== Director ===
Year	English title	Chinese title	Notes
2009	The Opposite Shore	河龙川岗	
2019	My Dear Liar	受益人	
2023	No More Bets	孤注一掷	
2024	Regeneration	新生	TV series
2025	Dead to Rights	南京照相馆	
2025	Escape from the Outland	用武之地	

== Awards ==
Year	Title	Awards
2020	My Dear Liar	Golden Rooster Award for Best Directorial Debut; Golden Deer Award for Best Directorial Debut
2023	No More Bets	Golden Angel Award for Top Ten Golden Angel Films; China Film Association Cup for Top Ten Film Scripts
2024	No More Bets	Golden Rooster Award for Best Editing
2024	Regeneration	Chinese American Film Festival for Best Web Series; Chinese American Film Festival for Outstanding Young Director
2025	Dead to Rights	Golden Deer Award for Best Picture; Golden Deer Award for Best Director; Golden Deer Award for Best Screenplay; China Newsweek Cover Person — Director of Influence
