= Endgame (2021 film) =

2021 Chinese-Hong Kong film by Rao Xiaozhi

- Official film poster
- Traditional Chinese: 人潮洶湧
- Simplified Chinese: 人潮汹涌
- Hanyu Pinyin: Rén Cháo Xiōng Yǒng
- Jyutping: Jan4 Ciu4 Hung2 Hung2
- Directed by: Rao Xiaozhi
- Screenplay by: Rao Xiaozhi; Fan Xiang; Li Xiang
- Based on: Key of Life by Kenji Uchida
- Produced by: Andy Lau
- Starring: Andy Lau; Xiao Yang; Wan Qian
- Cinematography: Cao Ying
- Edited by: Yu Ruchang
- Music by: Deng Ouge
- Production companies: Artown Film; Emperor Motion Picture; Rao Xiaozhi Film Studio; Enlight Pictures; Beijing Free Whale Pictures; Shaonianpai Pictures; Aisen Productions; Excuse Me Pictures
- Distributed by: Emperor Motion Pictures
- Release dates: 12 February 2021 (China); 18 March 2021 (Hong Kong)
- Running time: 119 minutes
- Countries: China; Hong Kong
- Language: Mandarin
- Box office: US$117.75 million (Note: See Box office)

Endgame is a 2021 action black comedy film co-written and directed by Rao Xiaozhi, produced by and starring Andy Lau. Lau stars as a world-class hitman who swaps identity with an unfortunate actor (Xiao Yang). A Chinese-Hong Kong co-production, the film is a remake of the 2012 Japanese film Key of Life. Production for the film began on 24 October 2019 and ended on 7 January 2020. The film was released on 12 February 2021, the first day of the Chinese New Year holidays.

== Plot ==
One night in a parking lot in Shanghai, a man named Wu Yanzhen was killed by hitman Zhou Quan, known as Mr. Z, after Wu made a call to his lover Zeng Jiurong, which was filmed by a civilian. On the other hand, a down-to-luck extra actor Chen Xiaomeng, who is broke and massively indebt gets almost hangs himself but halts when his phone rings. Xiaomeng then finds a coupon for a bathhouse and proceeds there while Quan also enters the same bathhouse while driving away from a police road block which turns out to be a filming set. When Xiaomeng is denied entry due to the coupon expiring by midnight, Quan helps him and the latter thanks him, but Quan ignores him. When Xiaomeng was showering, his soap bar slips out of his hand which Quan steps on and falls unconscious on the back of his head. Xiaomeng then takes Quan's locker key while placing his own next to Quan and leaves with Quan's belongings and car, where Xiaomeng finds an abundance of cash and uses it to pay off his debts as well as his ex-girlfriend who is about to get married.

Xiaomeng then visits Quan in the hospital to return his belongings but he discovers Quan has become amnesiac and Quan thinks he is Xiaomeng, so Xiaomeng decides to take on Quan's identity to enjoy a luxurious life, but he pays for Quan's hospital bills. On the other hand, author and media company CEO Li Xiang, who is a single mother, arrives to the hospital as her 12-year-old son, You, collapsed on physical education class. You tells his mother he is stressed preparing a speech about his father, whom he tells everyone that he is an astronaut.

While leaving the hospital, Xiang drives on a pudding which splashes on Quan so she offers him a ride to Xiaomeng's apartment address, which he thinks is his home. As Xiaomeng owes rent to his landlord, the landlord tries to kick Quan out but Xiang helps him pay rent. Seeing the rope that Xiaomeng used to hang himself, Quan deduces that he had suicidal thoughts and Xiang encourages him to scrap those thoughts. While cleaning up Xiaomeng's apartment, Quan finds items which define Xiaomeng's characteristics and thinks that they are his own, which he marks down on a notebook. Quan also takes up Xiaomeng's career as an extra actor and shows up to work on film sets.

Meanwhile, Xiaomeng accesses Quan's luxurious apartment and lives the time of his life. He then finds different identities and outfits of different professions, bad well as a pistol in his closet before receiving a phone call meant for Quan to receive CN¥200,000 payment for a previous killing job. Xiaomeng later bumps into Quan, who invites him and Xiang to his apartment, where Xiaomeng is surprised at how Quan has cleaned it up. When Quan talks about how failed he is in life, Xiaomeng feels ashamed and tries to encourage him but leaves when he awkwardly lashes out at a loud neighbor.

Xiaomeng later meets with Quan's employer, Wang Yanhui and Yan Sheng, both of whom never met Quan in person. Xiaomeng is shown a video of Quan killing Wu Yanzhen which was actually filmed by Sheng and this is when Xiaomeng learns Quan's true identity as a hitman. Xiaomeng manages to hide his fear and Wang gives him another job to kill Zeng Jiurong for CN¥100,000. When Xiaomeng leaves, he finds a bloodied raincoat and knife in the trunk of Quan's car and becomes terrified and flees for his life but calms down when he realizes he survived suicide once. He later finds Jiurong and gets close to her. As he gets to know her, he backs off from killing her so Wang threatens him.

Xiang meets up with Quan for dinner and secretly records their conversation as she is working on a new project on an amnesiac man. Xiang leaves some words of encouragement on Quan's notepad while also telling him about her own life as a single mother. Quan works hard to practice his acting techniques from watching different films and his serious work ethics wins the praise of directors. Xiang then asks Quan to help her steal an astronaut costume from the film set of The Wandering Earth to pose as You's astronaut father when he performs his speech at school and Quan agrees to help her and her son's speech wins the appauld from the entire school. At night, Quan and Xiang celebrate while pouring out their hearts to each other and after drinking red wine, Xiang expresses her love for Quan and kisses him. Later, Xiang drives Quan to a film shoot and while she watches him in action, a sudden flash during the filming of a killing scene brings Quan's memory back and he leaves the set without Xiang.

Meanwhile, Xiaomeng finds more cash in Quan's apartment which he gives to Jiurong and warns her about being an assassination target and tells her to flee with the cash. Xiaomeng then goes to return Quan's identity to him but is stopped by You who was returning Quan's notebook. At this time, Wang also notices Xiaomeng as an extra in a television series she was watching so she sends her underlings to find him. When Xiaomeng leaves driving Quan's car, Quan suddenly pops out from the back seat and holds a knife to Xiaomeng, demanding him to drive back to his apartment, while unbeknownst to them, Wang's underlings are tailing. Seeing how Xiaomeng has messed up his apartment, Quan slaps him and Xiaomeng attempts to shoot Quan with the latter's pistol which turns out to be an airsoft. Quan berates Xiaomeng and tells him he got cheated by Jiurong, who was pretending to be pregnant. Quan then reveals that he is not a real hitman, but he actually collaborates with his victims to fake their deaths when he receives a hit so he can receive pay from both his employer and his victims. At this time, Wang's underlings arrive at Quan's apartment, so Quan and Xiaomeng escape through a bathtub. Quan then rehearses with Xiaomeng to fake the latter's killing to keep Xiaomeng safe from Wang.

Xiang later calls Quan telling You has gone missing so Quan and Xiaomeng set out to find him and Xiaomeng sees You abducted by Wang's underling. Quan then arrives at Wang's hotpot restaurant posing as an interpol officer to scare Wang into handing out You, but it is foiled when fellow extra actor Ma Ming suddenly barges in their VIP room while drunk. Wang's underlings then beat up Quan and puts him in a bag. Xiaomeng then calls Wang to meet at an abandoned theatre stage and acts pysco and presents her with Jiurong's body and scares her into releasing Quan from the bag. Wang inspects the dead body and realizes the lack of smell of blood and it turns out Xiang disguising as Jiurong. Xiang then suddenly receives a call from You that he is home safe (since Wang's underling was a coward) and Quan reveals to Wang that he is the true Mr. Z and holds Yan hostage with a knife. Quan tells Xiaomeng and Xiang to drive away while he stays behind and is beaten by Wang's underlings. Xiaomeng later runs back to help Quan and the two fight off Wang's underlings before Xiang also comes back when she realizes You has called the police for her. Wang then picks up Quan's knife and stabs him multiple times, but the knife turns out to be fake and the police arrive to the scene.

While both are recovering at the hospital, Quan gifts Xiaomeng his watch as a souvenir. Some time later, Xiaomeng shows up at her ex-girlfriend's wedding begging her to give him back the cash he gave her earlier. Quan is later sentenced to probation for fraud and identification forgery while Wang is sentenced to ten years imprisonment for assault and Wu Yanzhen and Zeng Jiurong are wanted for fraud. When Quan was released from the detention center, Xiang picks him up and hugs him.

== Cast ==
- Andy Lau as Zhou Quan (周全), a cold-blooded, world-class hitman on the surface who actually stages fake murders for his target victims so he can earn money from both his employer and his victims.
- Xiao Yang as Chen Xiaomeng (陳小萌), a down-to-luck extra actor.
- Wan Qian as Li Xiang (李想), CEO of a media company and single mother.
- Huang Xiaolei as Wang Yanhui (王艷暉), Zhou's employer.
- Cheng Yi as Zeng Jiurong (曾九蓉), Wang Yanhui's former sworn sister.
- Liu Tianzuo as Ma Ming (麻明), convenor of the extra actors.
- Wally Wei as Chen's ex-girlfriend who is getting married.
- Ti Chih-chieh as Yan Sheng (殷勝), Wang's right-hand-man.
- Wei Zhihao as Li You (李由), Li's sixth-grader son.
- Jeffrey Guo as Chen's landlord.
- Lu Yang as himself.
- Frant Gwo as himself.
- Lei Jiayin as himself.
- Wang Xuebing as Wu Yanzhen (吳言真), Zhou's assassination target who is Wang's ex-boyfriend and Zeng's lover.

== Production ==
Filming for Endgame commenced on 24 October 2019 in Shanghai. On 21 November 2019, there were reports that star Andy Lau got into a dispute with co-star Xiao Yang, when the former had become frustrated waiting for the latter to have his makeup reapplied multiple times. As the incident was widely shared on the internet with footage leaked from the set, Xiao posted on his Sina Weibo and denied acting like a diva on set and expressed his gratefulness for the opportunity to work with Lau. Production company Emperor Entertainment also issued a statement denying such incident and claiming the footage is a scripted scene in the film. Production for Endgame officially wrapped up on 7 January 2020.

== Reception ==
=== Box office ===
As of 26 April 2021, Endgame has grossed a total of US$117.75 million worldwide combining its gross from China (US$117.56 million), Australia (US$140,006), New Zealand (US$24,307) and North America (US$23,149).

In China, the film grossed US$13.1 million during its first three days of release, debuting at No. 8 on its opening weekend. On its second weekend, the film grossed US$32.7 million, moving up to No. 5, and has grossed a total of US$45.8 million by then. During its third weekend, the film grossed US$30.5 million, moving up to No. 3, and have accumulated a total gross of US$76.4 million by then. On it fourth weekend, the film grossed US$20.6 million, moving up to No. 2, and have accumulated a total gross of US$97.2 million by then. During its fifth weekend, the film grossed US$15.5 million, coming in at No. 3, and gave grossed a total of US$112.6 million so far.

=== Critical response ===
Kim Lian-yue of Yahoo! gave the film a score of 3/5 stars and praises Andy Lau's nuanced performance alternating from a cool and helpless character but criticizes a romantic conflict which slows the film. Screen Daily praises Lau's performance "in a role that requires alternating between suave precision and humble charm" as well as the technical elements but notes the uneveness in the middle part of the film.
