= Old Boys: The Way of the Dragon =

- Film poster
- Directed by: Chopstick Brothers
- Written by: Xiao Yang
- Produced by: Dennis Chang; Ke Liming; Daniel Lee; Ian Powers; Cary Woodworth; Peter Xi
- Starring: Chopstick Brothers; Qu Jingjing; Wanting Qu
- Cinematography: Tony Cheung Tung-Leung
- Production companies: LeVision Pictures; Youku Tudou; Ruyi Films
- Release date: 10 July 2014 (China)
- Running time: 114 minutes
- Country: China
- Language: Mandarin
- Box office: US$32,800,000

Old Boys: The Way of the Dragon (Chinese: 老男孩猛龙过江) is a farcical 2014 Chinese musical-comedy film directed and written by the Chopstick Brothers (Xiao Yang and Wang Taili) and also starring Jingjing Qu. It was released on 10 July 2014.

== Plot ==
The film follows the story of the former old boys, Chopsticks Brothers (Xiao Dabao and Wang Xiaoshuai), who, despite experiencing many ups and downs in life, still hold on to their musical dreams. By chance, they receive a mysterious invitation to New York to participate in a global music competition.

In New York, they not only face fierce competition and cultural differences but also various challenges and difficulties in life. During this journey, the old boys make new friends and rekindle the passion and friendship of their youth. They interpret the meaning of dreams and perseverance in their own way, bringing laughter and moving moments to the audience.

Through this journey, the film showcases the persistence and relentless effort in pursuing dreams, while also incorporating humorous reflections on real life. Ultimately, with a positive and uplifting ending, it conveys an optimistic and positive attitude towards life.

== Cast ==
- Xiao Yang, as one of the two Chopstick brothers.
- Wang Taili, as the other of two Chopstick brothers.
- Qu Jingjing, as the girlfriend and current judge on the panel.
- Wanting Qu

== Soundtrack ==
The soundtrack for the film featured the viral Chinese hit song 'Little Apple'. This song has also attained high positions in main online charts in China. It peaked at number one in the CCTV Global Chinese Music Chart (Chinese: 全球中文音乐榜) released every Saturday. This song, referred to by one commentator as a "brainwashing song", also brings up the psychological factors that contribute to its success—its simple rhythm and lyrics cause the "earworm effect", forcing people to listen to it over and over again, and another reason that lied underneath is the "snowball effect", which means that people tend to follow others in a trend, suggesting that some people may not actually like the song, but just blindly following others.

== Reception ==
The film has grossed US$32.80 million in China.
