= Warriors of Future =

2022 Hong Kong film by Ng Yuen-fai

- Theatrical release poster
- Traditional Chinese: 明日戰記
- Simplified Chinese: 明日战记
- Hanyu Pinyin: Míng Rì Zhàn Jì
- Jyutping: Ming4 Jat6 Zin3 Gei3
- Directed by: Ng Yuen-fai
- Screenplay by: Lau Ho-leung; Mak Tin-shu
- Produced by: Tang Wai-but
- Starring: Louis Koo; Sean Lau; Carina Lau
- Cinematography: Ng Man-ching
- Edited by: Wong Hoi; Luk Chi-ho
- Music by: Chan Kwong-wing
- Production companies: One Cool Film Production; Media Asia Film Production; World Universe Culture; iQiyi Motion Pictures (Beijing); Beijing Unimedia Television Culture; Tianjin Maoyan Weying Media; Shenzhen Film Studio; Shanghai CMC Pictures; Beijing Gutian Film and Television Production Shenzhen Film & Television Co.; Beijing Le Art Media & Culture Co.; Lok Tin Films Production
- Distributed by: One Cool Pictures (Hong Kong, Worldwide); Intercontinental Film Distributors (HK); Netflix (Worldwide)
- Release dates: 15 August 2022 (HKIFF); 25 August 2022 (Hong Kong)
- Running time: 99 minutes
- Country: Hong Kong
- Language: Cantonese
- Budget: $56 million
- Box office: $111.2 million (Note: See Box office)

Warriors of Future (Chinese: 明日戰記; lit. 'Tomorrow's War'), previously known as Virtus (Chinese: 矛盾戰爭), is a 2022 Hong Kong military science fiction action film directed by visual effects artist Ng Yuen-fai in his directorial debut and starring Louis Koo, Sean Lau, and Carina Lau. Koo also serves as the film's executive producer, with the film being funded and distributed by his production company, One Cool Group Limited.

Having been in development for three years, the film began production on 12 February 2017 and was originally set for release in 2019. After a long delay, the film opened the 46th Hong Kong International Film Festival on 15 August 2022 and released theatrically on 25 August 2022 in Hong Kong.

The film became the highest-grossing domestic film in Hong Kong at that time. The box office record was then broken by A Guilty Conscience in February 2023.

== Plot ==
In 2055, war has ravaged the Earth due to the prevalent use of advanced military robots, and global warming and pollution have destroyed the environment and ruined the atmosphere. As a result, many people are born with birth defects and die. Large domes known as Skynets are built to protect the surviving cities on Earth. During the construction of the Skynet over Sector B-16 (a futuristic Hong Kong), a meteor lands in the city and brings a giant alien plant, later named Pandora, which emerges and causes devastation to the area as it takes root. Pandora grows rapidly when it rains, taking over more of the city every time; however, it is discovered that the plant can also purify the polluted air. Some time later, a military scientist, Dr. Chan, finds a way to alter the plant's genome to stop Pandora from growing further while also letting it continue to repair the atmosphere.

Tyler and his friend Captain Johnson Cheng, soldiers working for the local Air Combat Unit (ACU), are tasked with locating Pandora's pistil and delivering a "gene bullet" virus built with Dr. Chan's technology that will neutralize its growth. Colonel Tam is sent to oversee the operation, but she has a secret backup plan to bomb Pandora from the air should the operation fail, which would destroy the plant but could potentially kill a hundred and sixty thousand people in the surrounding area. Cheng heavily opposes the idea of sacrificing civilians and destroying their best chance to fix the atmosphere in Pandora. They agree to launch the mission as two rainstorms begin to hit Pandora, using the first rainstorm to locate Pandora's pistil and deliver the virus before the second rainstorm.

Privates Connor and Lincoln join Tyler on the mission to locate Pandora's pistil, then deploy military robots from an Orca transport aircraft to carry the gene bullet virus to the pistil. Sean Li, the commanding general of Sector B-16 and the architect of the Skynet project, realizes that neutralizing Pandora's growth to repair the atmosphere would lead to his Skynet dome being torn down. He resolves to sabotage the mission to preserve his life's work. During the mission he remotely takes control of the military robots when the first storm hits, crashing the Orca transport aircraft and jamming electronic communications between the team and headquarters. At the same time, Pandora awakens and attacks the aircraft trying to locate the pistil, crashing the other aircraft. As headquarters loses contact with all the aircraft, Tam plans to launch her backup plan but is stopped by Captain Cheng, who volunteers to drive in to save the mission. He recruits former teammate Skunk and they drive into Sector B-16.

Right before Tyler's aircraft crashes from Pandora's attacks, it locates the pistil. The crew survives though Lincoln is critically injured in the crash. Connor and Tyler take him to an abandoned hospital to look for medical supplies; however, they are attacked by mantis-like creatures from Pandora, who kill Lincoln. Connor hides in the mortuary while Tyler retreats to an emergency room where he rescues an orphaned girl, Pansy, who reminds Tyler of his deceased daughter Sissy. They are about to be overwhelmed when Cheng arrives in an armored suit and kills some of the mantis-like creatures, and the team escapes the hospital. The team reconnects with headquarters, gets the location of the Orca's crash and drives there to retrieve the gene bullet capsules. They successfully retrieve the last intact gene bullet capsule from the crash site, and also discover evidence that General Li had sabotaged the mission. The team contacts Li, saying that they have evidence of his sabotage. Li dismisses them and says they will have to first defeat his military robots before they can bring him to justice. He orders the robots to jam electronic communications again and sends them against the team. Colonel Tam, losing contact with the team again, begins her backup plan and deploys a bomber to Pandora.

Tyler, Connor, Cheng and Skunk race towards the location of the pistil, pursued by a tank-like military robot and several humanoid robots. As Skunk drives their armored car, Tyler, Connor and Cheng fight off the robots. Cheng jumps out of the car in an apparent act of sacrifice to destroy the tank-like robot and save the rest of the group. The others arrive at the location above the underground pistil is and encounter a large crab-like military robot and a final humanoid robot. Tyler, Connor and Cheng battle the robots and are at the edge of defeat when their armored car is destroyed, apparently with Pansy in it. Galvanized by the loss, they destroy the robots and their jamming device. Cheng suddenly re-emerges with Pansy, who left the car before it was destroyed. They reconnect with headquarters, and Tam calls off the bombing. Cheng brings the gene bullet into Pandora's pistil chamber just as the second rainstorm hits and Pandora begins to grow uncontrollably. Cheng unleashes the virus, which successfully freezes Pandora and stops it from growing further. Both the team and headquarters are elated to see the mission succeed. Seeing this, General Li knows he's been caught and commits suicide.

One week later, Pandora continued to be placated while gradually removing pollution from the atmosphere. Tyler washes Skunk's new armored car while Skunk lounges in a new military haircut and uniform, having rejoined the military; they gossip about Cheng who they surmise must be meeting with senior military leadership. In a mid-credits scene, Tyler is seen piloting a spaceship heading towards the moon.

Cast

- Louis Koo as Tyler (泰來), principal force of B-16's Air Force who possesses extraordinary skills in operating fighter jets. His daughter died due to environmental pollution spiraling out of control, resulting him becoming very hot-tempered.
- Sean Lau as Johnson Cheng (鄭重生), commander of B-16's Air Force and Tyler's brother-in-arms who is always determined to never give up and believes soldiers are more reliable than robots.
- Carina Lau as Colonel Tam Bing (譚冰), sent to District B-16 to execute the genetics alteration project.
- Philip Keung as Yau Tai-long (游大郎), nicknamed Skunk (臭鼬), a former member of B-16's Air Force who was dismissed after committing a major mistake and became at odds with Tyler. He was later recruited by Johnson to rejoin the force to participate in the plan to alter the genetics of "Pandora".
- Tse Kwan-ho as Dr. Chan Chong-Chung (陳蒼松博士), a scientist who successfully examines the genetic map of "Pandora".
- Janice Wu as Xiao Lü (小綠), a correspondent.
- Wan Guopeng as Connor Kwong (光仔), a junior member of B-16's Air Force and Tyler's subordinate.
- Nick Cheung as Sean Li (李昇), commander in chief of District B-16 and the main driving force of Project Skynet city dome. He sabotages the mission as a threat to his project as the city dome would no longer be needed. (guest appearance)
- Eddy Ko

== Production ==
The film was first announced in May 2015 under the title Virtus to be directed by Benny Chan and starring Louis Koo. Koo's film production company, One Cool Film Production worked on the film's visual effects, under a budget of HK$300 million. Although filming was set to begin in the end of 2015, a teaser trailer was released which featured Koo in a robot suit.

Production began on 12 February 2017 on a set in Shenzhen which took two months to build. The film is directed by visual effects artist Ng Yuen-fai, who worked on the special effects for The Warlords, Bodyguards and Assassins and The White Storm. Aside from Koo, the cast also includes Sean Lau and Philip Keung, alongside newcomer actors Kevin Chu, Ng Siu-hin and Tony Wu. In March 2017, One Cool Film Production released a making of featurette teaser displaying its new title, Warriors of Future, and revealing the film's 36 month pre-production and its new budget of US$45 million. According to the teaser, production for the film is slated to take 4 months to complete while post-production will take 18 months. The film's four month shoot in Shenzhen completed in June 2017 and resumed its shoot in Hong Kong in August 2017. In March 2018, a new teaser trailer for the film was released. Aside from previous announced cast members, the trailer also featured new cast members such as Carina Lau, Nick Cheung and Tse Kwan-ho. On the same day, it was also reported that the film's production has increased to US$56 million. In March 2019, One Cool Film Production released a new trailer for the film.

== Release ==
Warriors of Future opened the 46th Hong Kong International Film Festival along with the film, Where the Wind Blows, on 15 August 2022 before its theatrical release on 25 August 2022 in Hong Kong in IMAX, 4DX and CFGS formats. The film was originally set for theatrical release in 2019, but its release was delayed for three years in order to allow time for post-production. On 10 December 2021, One Cool Pictures released a promotional clip featuring former TVB News anchor Vince Ng in a mock news clip reporting a meteorite is approaching the Earth and is projected to hit the Hong Kong at 8 PM on 17 December 2021, which was when a new trailer for the film premiered on billboard screens throughout Hong Kong before being available on the internet, displaying a slated release year of 2022.

Netflix acquired the global distribution rights for the film and released it for streaming on 2 December 2022.

== Reception ==
=== Box office ===
Warriors of Future has grossed a total of US$111.2 million worldwide combining its box office gross from Hong Kong (US$10.5 million), and mainland China (US$100.73 million).

Warriors of Future has grossed 310 million CNY (HK$356 million, US$45 million) in mainland China as of 14 August 2022, and HK$6.2 million in Hong Kong preview screenings between 19 and 21 August 2022. The film earned a three-day gross US$9.8 million during the weekend of 26–28 August 2022 and was placed at No. 7 at the global box office of the weekend. Some box office analysts estimated the film would need to make HK$1.2 billion (US$153 million) globally to break even.

In Hong Kong, the film debuted at No. 1 on its opening weekend with HK$19,703,177 (US$2,511,463) during its first four days of release and a total gross of HK$21,784,237 ($2,776,725) at the end of the week including preview showings. It also became the biggest opening for a local film at the Hong Kong box office since the beginning of the COVID-19 pandemic. The film remained at No. 1 in its second weekend grossing HK$22,266,042 (US$2,838,138) and have grossed a total of HK$44,069,479 (US$5,617,310) by then. The film moved down to No. 2 in its third weekend, grossing a HK$9,484,285 (US$1,208,374), and accumulating a total gross of HK$53,553,764 (US$6,823,179) by then. During its fourth weekend, the film grossed HK$6,823,127 (US$869,277) while remaining at No. 2, and have grossed a total of HK$60,376,891 (US$7,692,108) by then. The film stayed at No. 2 during its fifth weekend with a gross of HK$3,003,071 (US$382,586), and have accumulated a total gross of HK$63,379,962 (US$8,074,498) by then.

In six weeks since the opening of the film, the cumulative box office exceeded HK$66.84 million Hong Kong dollars, breaking the box office record of Cold War II of 66.82 million, becoming the highest-grossing domestic film in Hong Kong at that time. During its eighth weekend, the film continued to remain at No. 2 with a gross of HK$3,338,619 (US$425,307), and accumulated a total gross of HK$68,856,200 (US$8,771,602) by then. The film continued to remain at No. 2 on its ninth weekend with an increased gross of HK$4,495,621 (US$572,691), and have grossed a total of HK$73,351,821 (US$9,344,181) so far, becoming the first domestic film to gross pass HK$70 million in Hong Kong.

The film dropped to No. 3 on its tenth weekend while still grossing a strong HK$3,115,109 (US$396,854), and have accumulated a total gross of HK$76,466,930 (US$9,741,630) by then. On its eleventh weekend, the film grossed HK$1,579,312 (US$201,222), coming in at No. 4, and have grossed a total of HK$78,046,242 (US$9,943,970) by then. The film remained at No. 4 in its twelfth with a gross of HK$1,412,898 (US$179,994), accumulating a total gross of HK$79,475,140 (US$10,124,609) by then. During its thirteenth weekend, the film grossed HK$805,648 (US$102,808) at No. 5, and have accumulated a total of gross HK$80,280,788 (US$10,244,600), becoming the first domestic film in Hong Kong to pass the HK$80 million The film remained at No. 5 in its fourteenth weekend with a gross of HK$754,115 (US$96,410), while having accumulated a total gross of HK$81,034,903 (US$10,360,002) by then. During its fifteenth weekend, the film dropped to No. 8 with a gross of HK$397,698 (US$50,899), and have accumulated a total gross of HK$81,432,601 (US$10,422,172) by then. The film came in at No. 10 in its sixteenth weekend with a gross of HK$273,422 (US$35,104), while having grossed a total of HK$81,706,023 (US$10,490,328) so far.

=== Critical response ===
Rotten Tomatoes, a review aggregator, reports that 100% of five surveyed critics gave the film a positive review; the average rating is 6.5/10. Edmund Lee of the South China Morning Post gave the film a score of 3/5 stars and praises the film's visual effects as groundbreaking and a milestone in Hong Kong cinema while criticizing the film's lack of fresh ideas.

== Awards and nominations ==
Ceremony	Category	Recipient	Results
41st Hong Kong Film Awards	Best Film	Warriors of Future	Nominated
41st Hong Kong Film Awards	Best Cinematography	Ng Kai-ming	Nominated
41st Hong Kong Film Awards	Best Film Editing	Wong Hoi, Kenny Luk	Nominated
41st Hong Kong Film Awards	Best Art Direction	Alex Mok, Lam Wai-kin	Nominated
41st Hong Kong Film Awards	Best Costume & Makeup Design	Cheung Siu-hong	Nominated
41st Hong Kong Film Awards	Best Action Choreography	Jack Wong	Won
41st Hong Kong Film Awards	Best Original Film Score	Chan Kwong-wing	Nominated
41st Hong Kong Film Awards	Best Original Film Song	Song: Tomorrow of Tomorrow (明日之明日) Composer: Chan Kwong-wing; Lyricist: Oscar; Singer: Ansonbean, Winka Chan@Collar	Nominated
41st Hong Kong Film Awards	Best Sound Design	Nopawat Likitwong, Stan Yau, Sarunyu Nurnsai, Dhanarat Dhitirojana	Won
41st Hong Kong Film Awards	Best Visual Effects	Chas Chau, Leung Wai-kit, Kwok Tai, May Law	Won
41st Hong Kong Film Awards	Best New Director	Ng Yuen-fai	Nominated
