= Star Lighting =

"Star Lighting (Chinese: 星星點燈)"

Song by Zheng Zhihua

from the album Star Lighting
- Language: Chinese
- Released: December 1992
- Length: 4:50

Music video
- "Star Lighting" on YouTube

"Star Lighting" (Chinese: 星星點燈) is a song by Taiwanese singer Zheng Zhihua (Chinese: 鄭智化) that was released in 1992.

== Release ==
Upon release, the song became popular in mainland China and Taiwan.

== Controversy ==
When the song was sung by the Cantopop group Twins on the variety show Sisters Who Make Waves for Hunan Television in 2020, the lyrics that translate to “The sky is now dirty, and the stars cannot be seen anymore” (Chinese: 現在的一片天，是骯髒的一片天，星星在文明的天空裡，再也看不見) were modified to “The sky now looks clear and the stars can always be seen” (Chinese: 現在的一片天，是晴朗的一片天，星星在文明的天空裡，總是看得見). The synthetics were replaced with disco-like pop beats. This incident highlights censorship in mainland China. Zheng Zhihua took up to Weibo to express his disapproval for the changes.

== Other versions ==
In 2019, Yang Bozhi sang the song on FTV's Taiwan NO.1.

== Lyrics ==
Lyrics	Transliteration	English Translation
抬頭的一片天 是男兒的一片天	Táitóu de yīpiàn tiān shì nán'ér de yīpiàn tiān	The sky you look up to is the sky for men
曾經在滿天的星光下 做夢的少年	Céngjīng zài mǎn tiān de xīngguāng xià zuòmèng de shàonián	The boy who once dreamed under the starry sky
不知道天多高 不知道海多遠	Bù zhīdào tiān duō gāo bù zhīdào hǎi duō yuǎn	I don't know how high the sky is, I don't know how far the sea is
卻發誓要帶著你 遠走到海角天邊	Què fāshì yào dàizhe nǐ yuǎn zǒu dào hǎi jiǎo tiānbiān	But I swear to take you to the ends of the earth
不負責任的誓言 年少輕狂的我	Bù fù zérèn de shìyán niánshào qīngkuáng de wǒ	Irresponsible oath, young and frivolous me
在黑暗中迷失 才發現自己的脆弱	Zài hēi'àn zhōng míshī cái fāxiàn zìjǐ de cuìruò	Lost in the darkness, I discovered my own fragility
看著你哭紅的眼睛 想著遠離的家門	Kànzhe nǐ kū hóng de yǎnjīng xiǎngzhe yuǎnlí de jiāmén	Looking at your red eyes from crying, thinking about the home far away
滿天的星星請為我 點盞希望的燈火	Mǎn tiān de xīngxīng qǐng wèi wǒ diǎn zhǎn xīwàng de dēnghuǒ	The stars in the sky, please light a lamp of hope for me
Chorus
星星點燈 照亮我的家門	Xīngxīng diǎn dēng zhào liàng wǒ de jiāmén	The stars light up my house
讓迷失的孩子 找到來時的路	Ràng míshī de háizǐ zhǎodào lái shí de lù	Let the lost children find their way back
星星點燈 照亮我的前程	Xīngxīng diǎn dēng zhào liàng wǒ de qiánchéng	The stars light up my future
用一點光 溫暖孩子的心	Yòng yīdiǎn guāng wēnnuǎn háizǐ de xīn	Use a little light to warm the children's hearts
back to the verse
現在的一片天 是骯髒的一片天	Xiànzài de yīpiàn tiān shì āng zāng de yīpiàn tiān	The sky now is a dirty sky
星星在文明的天空裡 再也看不見	Xīngxīng zài wénmíng de tiānkōng lǐ zài yě kàn bùjiàn	The stars are no longer visible in the civilized sky
天其實並不高 海其實也不遠	Tiān qíshí bìng bù gāo hǎi qíshí yě bù yuǎn	The sky is not actually high and the sea is not actually far away
人心其實比天高 比海更遙遠	Rénxīn qíshí bǐ tiān gāo bǐ hǎi gèng yáoyuǎn	The human heart is actually higher than the sky and farther than the sea
學會騙人的謊言 追逐名利的我	Xuéhuì piàn rén de huǎngyán zhuīzhú mínglì de wǒ	I learned to lie to others, chasing fame and fortune
在現實中迷失 才發現自己的脆弱	Zài xiànshí zhōng míshī cái fāxiàn zìjǐ de cuìruò	Lost in reality, I discovered my own fragility
看著你含淚地離去 想著茫茫的前程	Kànzhe nǐ hán lèi de lí qù xiǎngzhe mángmáng de qiánchéng	Watching you leave with tears in your eyes, thinking about the uncertain future
遠方的星星請為我 點盞希望的燈火	Yuǎnfāng de xīngxīng qǐng wèi wǒ diǎn zhǎn xīwàng de dēnghuǒ	Stars in the distance, please light a lamp of hope for me
Chorus
星星點燈 照亮我的家門	Xīngxīng diǎn dēng zhào liàng wǒ de jiāmén	The stars light up my house
讓迷失的孩子 找到來時的路	Ràng míshī de háizǐ zhǎodào lái shí de lù	Let the lost children find their way back
星星點燈 照亮我的前程	Xīngxīng diǎn dēng zhào liàng wǒ de qiánchéng	The stars light up my future
用一點光 溫暖孩子的心	Yòng yīdiǎn guāng wēnnuǎn háizǐ de xīn	Use a little light to warm the children's hearts
bridge
多年以後 一場大雨 驚醒沉睡的我	Duōnián yǐhòu yīchǎng dàyǔ jīngxǐng chénshuì de wǒ	Many years later, a heavy rain woke me up from my deep sleep
突然之間 都市的霓虹 都不再閃爍	Túrán zhī jiān dūshì de ní hóng dōu bù zài shǎnshuò	Suddenly, the neon lights in the city stopped flashing
天邊有顆 模糊的星光 偷偷探出了頭	Tiānbiān yǒu kē móhú de xīngguāng tōutōu tàn chūle tóu	There is a fuzzy starlight on the horizon, secretly peeking out
是你的眼神 依舊在遠方 為我在等候	Shì nǐ de yǎnshén yījiù zài yuǎnfāng wèi wǒ zài děnghòu	It's your eyes that are still waiting for me in the distance
Chorus (x2)
星星點燈 照亮我的家門	Xīngxīng diǎn dēng zhào liàng wǒ de jiāmén	The stars light up my house
讓迷失的孩子 找到來時的路	Ràng míshī de háizǐ zhǎodào lái shí de lù	Let the lost children find their way back
星星點燈 照亮我的前程	Xīngxīng diǎn dēng zhào liàng wǒ de qiánchéng	The stars light up my future
用一點光 溫暖孩子的心	Yòng yīdiǎn guāng wēnnuǎn háizǐ de xīn	Use a little light to warm the children's hearts
