= No More Bets =

2023 crime film directed by Shen Ao

- Theatrical release poster
- Simplified Chinese: 孤注一掷
- Traditional Chinese: 孤注一擲
- Literal meaning: To Bet All In
- Hanyu Pinyin: Gū Zhù Yī Zhì
- Jyutping: gu1 zyu3 jat1 zaak6
- Directed by: Shen Ao
- Written by: Shen Ao; Zhang Yifan; Xu Luyang
- Produced by: Ning Hao; Randy Liu
- Starring: Lay Zhang; Gina Jin; Yong Mei; Wang Chuanjun; Darren Wang; Zhou Ye; Sunny Sun
- Cinematography: He Wenqiang; Wang Tianxing
- Music by: Fei Peng
- Production companies: Dirty Monkeys; Bad Monkey (Shanghai) Culture Communication Ltd. Shanghai Ticketmaster Film & TV Culture Co., Ltd. China Film Group Corporation; Beijing Shanglion Culture Communication Co.
- Release date: 8 August 2023 (China)
- Running time: 130 minutes
- Country: China
- Language: Mandarin
- Box office: $540.5 million

No More Bets (Chinese: 孤注一掷; pinyin: Gū Zhù Yī Zhì) is a 2023 Chinese crime thriller film directed by Shen Ao and produced by Ning Hao. The film chronicles a story about Chinese people being trafficked overseas to a Southeast Asian country and forced to commit Internet fraud. It features Lay Zhang, Gina Jin, Yong Mei, Wang Chuanjun, Darren Wang, Zhou Ye, and Sunny Sun. The film was released in China in both regular theaters and IMAX on August 8, 2023 and achieved box office success, earning a gross of over $500 million.

In response to the film, Cambodia banned showings of No More Bets due to its potential allusion to the country and the negative image it portrays, while the film was criticised by the governments of Myanmar.

== Plot ==
In 2018, Programmer Pan Sheng is lured overseas by a supposed high-paying job and is trafficked into a Canaan (Note: fictional country in Southeast Asia) slave-camp-like fraud factory, where he is threatened by violence into committing online fraud on behalf of the controlling syndicate. In the camp, Sheng encounters model Liang Anna, who was similarly recruited under false pretenses, and who works on-camera as a dealer in the online gambling section. Sheng offers to help Anna reach her sales target, after which she will supposedly be allowed to leave and can send a message on Sheng's behalf to his loved ones.

Sheng uses Anna's identity to catfish Gu Tianzhi, a young man who becomes addicted to online gambling. Sheng baits Tianzhi with "tips" to encourage increased betting, which pulls Tianzhi into debt. Tianzhi's girlfriend Song Yu goes to the police, and is told by officer Zhao Dongran that Tianzhi is likely the victim of a scam. During the 2018 FIFA World Cup final, Tianzhi sits at a bar and bets a large amount of money on the winning team, and is euphoric watching the game's end on television, thinking he has made a fortune. Instead, he finds Yu has cancelled the bet at the last minute.

Tianzhi obtains more money from his grandmother, who has dementia, and is tricked into performing a direct transfer of ¥ 8 million to "Anna", which is detected by but cannot be stopped by Zhao's online monitoring taskforce. The money is quickly withdrawn by the syndicate, who celebrate the success while Tianzhi tries to commit suicide by falling out his apartment window.

Anna is told by the camp's manager Lu Bingkun that her sales target has increased and she cannot leave. Sheng offers to build an app for Lu to run scams efficiently, and is given new privileges for his efforts. Sheng writes "SOS", "12308 (Note: +86-10-12308 is the hotline of Global Consular Protection and Service Emergency Hotline (24 hours) of the Ministry of Foreign Affairs)" on a bank note seeking rescue, but it is intercepted, and Sheng and Anna, voluntarily admit, are both tortured as punishment. While being transferred in a bus, Anna jumps out and runs to a police station, but the officers work for the syndicate. Cai, Lu's enforcer, stages Anna's murder but lets her escape.

Zhao meets Song Yu again, and is able to connect the messages on Tianzhi's phone with Anna's real identity. Anna manages to return home, where she is picked up by the police but refuses to explain where she's been. Anna is made to attend a scam awareness seminar and is taken to see Tianzhi in the hospital in a vegetative state. This compels her to share what she knows about the syndicate.

A large-scale anti-fraud operation is launched. Lu and Cai become persons of interest and multiple raids are carried out. When Zhao and the officers investigate the camp, they find it empty and the computers removed. The taskforce is about to leave the country when they receive a call from Sheng's friend who has just realized that Sheng has been sending coded messages to him asking for help. Using those messages, Zhao and the taskforce are able to locate the syndicate's hiding place in an elementary school, which they successfully raid and arrest everyone except Cai, who is killed in a shootout. Although Lu has all the computers destroyed, the app Sheng built for Lu's phone retains information of the scams and victims, which is used as evidence against the syndicate.

In an epilogue, Zhao leads an anti-fraud conference with Song Yu, Sheng and Anna as speakers. In the audience, a member of the syndicate watches them.

== Cast ==
- Lay Zhang as Pan Sheng (Chinese: 潘生), a programmer trapped in the fraud factory
- Gina Jin as Liang Anna (梁安娜), a model trapped as a croupier in the fraud factory
- Yong Mei as Zhao Dongran (赵东冉), a Chinese police officer
- Wang Chuanjun as Lu Bingkun (陆秉坤), the manager of the fraud factory
- Darren Wang as Gu Tianzhi (顾天之), a stranger defrauded by Pan and Liang
- Zhou Ye as Song Yu (宋雨), the girlfriend of Gu
- Sunny Sun as An Juncai (安俊才), the second hand of Lu

Sheren Tang and Lam Wai appear as Tianzhi's mother and father, respectively.

== Production ==
At the time of filming, director Shen Ao was a newcomer signed by Ning Hao's Dirty Monkey 72 Transformations Film Project. This was his second feature film, following My Dear Liar in 2019. In 2020, a friend told him a suicide case due to cyber fraud and gambling. He decided to turn it into a crime film.

Before filming, the director team, with the support of the police and the anti-fraud center, collected overseas online fraud cases in the past three years. The materials including pictures, texts, audio and videos, reached 1TB hardware size. The script writing took one year and a half. Tens of thousands of cases had been analyzed and distilled.

In June 2021, the Dirty Monkey studio revealed the film and its cast, featuring Lay Zhang and Gina Jin.

== Release ==
The film began test screening on August 5, 2023, and scheduled the general release on August 11, 2023. It quickly became a box office hit in China. The film then changed its general release date to August 8, 2023.

== Reception ==
=== Box office ===
By August 8, 2023, three days since the test screening, its box office gross was $69.3 million. This makes it the highest test screening gross in Chinese film history. On the opening weekend after general release, the film earned $88 million gross, making it the No.1 box office in the world on that weekend. After its first five weeks, it grossed $505 million USD.

=== Critical reception ===
The Japan Times stated that "Crime action film "No More Bets," which has topped the Chinese box office since its release in early August, offers an unprecedented peek into the intricate workings of cybercrime in Southeast Asia."

The South China Morning Post described the movie as an "idiotic take on a very serious subject" powered by "histrionic scaremongering and xenophobia", while The Diplomat points out that "almost every character is Chinese", including the criminals and their victims, and the movie accurately depicts the "self-contained mini-Chinas of Southeast Asia".

== Controversies ==
=== Ban by Cambodia ===
The Ministry of Culture and Fine Arts of Cambodia announced on 27 September 2023 that it will not allow No More Bets to be screened in theatres over fears the film would damage Cambodia's international reputation. In particular, the Ministry fears that the film would discourage foreign investors and tourists from Cambodia. Although the film is set in fictional country of "Canaan" (迦南), Khmer text can be seen throughout the film. Pa Chanrouen, President of the Cambodia Institute for Democracy, said to news site Cambodianess that “the movie will make international tourists scared of coming to Cambodia." The Ministry of Culture and Fine Arts has cooperated with other government agencies to restrict access to the film in Cambodia. The Ministry of Posts and Telecommunication in particular was tasked with censoring clips of the film online and stopping its spread through social media. According to the Spokesperson of the Ministry of Culture and Fine Arts, Song Man, the ministry sent a letter to the Embassy of China in Phnom Penh asking them to cooperate with Cambodian authorities. They also requested Chinese authorities halt showings of the film in China.

=== Criticism by Myanmar ===
The military junta of Myanmar, the State Administration Council, has criticised No More Bets as hurting its reputation, due to the film prominently displaying Burmese language throughout the criminal portions of the film. No More Bets has not been shown in Myanmar cinemas.

Myanmar's Consul-General in Nanning, China, U Kyaw Soe Thein, met with the Director of the Foreign Office of Guangxi Zhuang Autonomous Region, Lian Yin, on 26 September to discuss the film's role in "hurting" Myanmar's reputation in China. A poll conducted by the Japan Times on Weibo found that 48,000 of the 54,000 polled would shun travelling to Myanmar.

=== Criticism by Thailand ===
Puangpet Chunlaiad, Thailand's Prime Minister Office Minister, raised concerns on 27 November 2023 to Han Zhiqiang, ambassador of China to Thailand. She said that the film risks the confidence of Chinese tourists in visiting Thailand, and that the crimes depicted in the film do not occur in Thailand. In response, Han said he didn't believe it affected the amount of tourists visiting Thailand. Several clips in the film showcase messages written in Thai. Vice-president of the Tourism Council of Thailand Surawat Akaraworamet said in September 2023 that the film soured Chinese feelings toward travelling to mainland Southeast Asia, which has been weak in recent times.

== See also ==
- Fraud factory
- Pig butchering scam
- Philippine Offshore Gaming Operator
- Disappearance of Wang Xing
