= Evil Unbound =

- Theatrical release poster
- 731
- Directed by: Zhao Linshan
- Written by: Liu Heng; Zhao Linshan
- Produced by: Bi Shulin; Hu Fan
- Starring: Jiang Wu; Wang Zhiwen; Li Naiwen
- Cinematography: He Xiang
- Music by: Jiawi Shen
- Production companies: Changchun Film Studio Group Co., ltd. Poly Film Investment Co., Ltd. HY Media
- Distributed by: HY Media
- Release date: September 18, 2025
- Running time: 125 minutes
- Country: China
- Languages: Mandarin; Japanese

Evil Unbound (Chinese: 731) is a 2025 Chinese historical drama film co-written and directed by Zhao Linshan, and starring Jiang Wu, Wang Zhiwen, and Li Naiwen. The film follows the story of atrocities committed by the Imperial Japanese Army's Unit 731 during the Second Sino-Japanese War and World War II. The film premiered in Harbin on 17 September 2025 with wide-release in China on 18 September 2025, coinciding with the 94th anniversary of the September 18 Incident, which marked the start of Empire of Japan's invasion of China.

The film received negative reviews and experienced review bombing online, leading to review site Douban not displaying its average rating.

== Plot ==
In Northeast China, dark and mysterious truths unravel about the horrific experimentation on prison inmates conducted at Unit 731.

== Cast ==
- Jiang Wu as Wang Yongzhang, a local vendor
- Wang Zhiwen as Du Cunshan
- Li Naiwen as Gu Boxuan
- Sun Qian as Lin Suxian
- Feng Wenjuan as Kayo Imamura
- Lin Ziye as Sun Minglian
- Irene Wan as Shinzo
- Li Shanyu as Liang Aiying
- Li Zilin
- Ulantoya Duo
- Zhang Qi as Liang Xingguo
- Li Yu as Shanghai Native
- Xu Guangyu as Jin Changfu
- Liu Zhankui
- Yasuyuki Hirata as Shiro Ishii

== Soundtrack ==
No.	Title	Lyrics	Music	Singer(s)	Length
1.	"Unit 731" (Promotion song)	Tim Moyo	Tim Moyo	Tim Moyo
2.	"May You See Me Again (愿你再见我时)" (Opening theme)	Jin Liang	Meng Wenhao	Tan Weiwei

== Production ==
Director Zhao Linshan spent over a decade researching the film, consulting extensive historical archives, including 8,000 pages of declassified U.S. reports on Unit 731 and 423 hours of testimonies from former unit members.

This film was shot in northeast China's Heilongjiang province and Dongfang Yingdu Film and Television Industrial Park in Qingdao, east China's Shandong province.

== Release ==
China News Service reel about the movie's release.

Evil Unbound was released on 18 September 2025 in China, Australia and New Zealand and on September 19 in the United States and Canada.

The film's English title Evil Unbound, emphasizes the unrestrained nature of the crimes committed.

== Box office ==
Evil Unbound broke records in China, with pre-sales exceeding 108 million yuan and over 269,000 screening on its first day, making it the highest single-day screening film in the film history of China.

However, due to poor critical reception, the film experienced a nearly 90% box office drop between its first and second weekend.
