= Two Thumbs Up (film) =

2015 Hong Kong film by Lau Ho-leung

- Film poster
- Traditional Chinese: 衝鋒車
- Simplified Chinese: 冲锋车
- Hanyu Pinyin: Chōng Fēng Chē
- Jyutping: Cung1 Fung1 Ce1
- Directed by: Lau Ho-leung
- Screenplay by: Lau Ho-leung
- Produced by: Albert Lee; Cheang Pou-soi; Julia Chu; Tong Man-hong; Zack Xu; Yang Xianghua
- Starring: Francis Ng; Simon Yam; Leo Ku; Patrick Tam; Mark Cheng; Christie Chen; Philip Keung
- Cinematography: Pakie Chan
- Edited by: Chan Ki-hop
- Music by: I.M.P. Lam Kwan-fai; Julian Chan
- Production companies: Emperor Motion Pictures; Sil-Metropole Organisation; Huace Pictures iQiyi Motion Pictures
- Distributed by: Emperor Motion Pictures
- Release date: 2 April 2015 (Hong Kong)
- Running time: 103 minutes
- Country: Hong Kong
- Language: Cantonese
- Budget: US$3.5 million
- Box office: US$5.2 million

Two Thumbs Up is a 2015 Hong Kong action comedy film directed by first-time director Lau Ho-leung and starring Francis Ng, Simon Yam, Leo Ku, Patrick Tam, Mark Cheng, Christie Chen and Philip Keung.

== Plot ==
On 5 April 2014, Twitch released a plot synopsis of the film:

Lucifer and his gangsters dress their minibus to resemble a police vehicle, and pose as policemen for a robbery. Police Officer Tsui sensed "criminal intent." Without police orders, he investigates these gangsters. At the robbery the gangsters engage in a gunfight against the real criminals, who kill randomly. Lucifer and his men are infuriated. They may wear police costumes and use toy guns, but their passion is real. Sensing their righteous passion, Tsui decides to side with the impostors and their 16-passenger EU vehicle. Lucifer and his men re-discover the bond they felt when they used to battle together. Finally, Tsui, Lucifer and the gang defeat the criminals, showing Tsui that anyone can be a hero, and righteousness resides within us all.

== Cast ==
- Francis Ng as Lucifer (盧西發)
- Simon Yam as Chow Tai-po (周大寶)
- Leo Ku as Officer Tsui On-leung (徐安良)
- Patrick Tam as Johnny To (杜忡尼)
- Mark Cheng as Lam Tung (林東)
- Christie Chen as Robber Girl
- Philip Keung as Chief of Robbers
- Rock Ji as Robber A
- Jie Zhuang as Ice Cream Lady
- Jamie Cheung as Tsang Ching-yee (曾靜儀)
- Siu Yam-yam as Wild Boar Aunt (野豬婆婆)
- Jack Kao as Warden
- Law Wing-cheung as Bowling Alley's Owner
- Alan Mak as Tsui Po-on (徐步安)
- Felix Chong as Inspector of Police
- Mark Wu as Cup Noodle Father
- Dayo Wong as Cheung Po-keung (張寶強) (scenes removed from final cut)

== Production ==
Principal photography for Two Thumbs Up started on 15 January 2014 where a blessing ceremony was held in which the cast and crew attended.

== Release ==
On 24 March 2014, a press conference for Two Thumbs Up was held at the 38th Hong Kong International Film Festival where its teaser trailer was unveiled. The film premiered at the 39th Hong Kong International Film Festival which ran from 23 March to 6 April 2015 was theatrically released in Hong Kong on 2 April 2015.

== Box office ==
The film opened third place at its debut and during the first six days of release in Hong Kong, Two Thumbs Up grossed HK$5.90 million. The film grossed HK$4.01 million between 9–12 April. After two weekends, the film have grossed a total of HK$8.91 million. During its third weekend, the film remained at third place and has made a total of HK$11.5 million to date. The film had earned CN¥20.84 million at the Chinese box office.

== Awards and nominations ==
Awards and nominations
| Ceremony | Category | Recipient | Outcome |
|---|---|---|---|
| 35th Hong Kong Film Awards | Best Screenplay | Lau Ho-leung | Nominated |
| 35th Hong Kong Film Awards | Best New Director | Lau Ho-leung | Nominated |
| 3rd China International Film Festival London | Best Supporting Actor | Leo Ku | Won |
| 3rd China International Film Festival London | Best New Director | Lau Ho-leung | Won |
