= Escape from the Outland =

- Theatrical release poster

Chinese name
- Simplified Chinese: 用武之地
Transcriptions
Standard Mandarin
- Hanyu Pinyin: Yòng wǔ zhī dì
- Directed by: Shen Ao
- Written by: Shen Ao; Xu Luyang
- Produced by: Ning Hao
- Starring: Xiao Yang; Qi Xi; Simon Yam; Zheng Kai; Pan Binlong; Fathi Anouar Ghammam
- Cinematography: Rui Zhong
- Edited by: Jiang Yijun; Shen Ao
- Music by: Deng Ou Ge
- Production companies: Dirty Monkey Productions; Yuuya Media; Super Lion; China Film Group Corporation
- Distributed by: Shaw Organization
- Release date: 31 December 2025
- Running time: 131 minutes
- Country: China
- Language: Mandarin

Escape from the Outland (Chinese: 用武之地, romanized: Yòng wǔ zhī dì) is a 2025 Chinese war-themed drama film directed by Shen Ao and co-written by Shen Ao and Xu Luyang. The film stars Xiao Yang, Qi Xi, Simon Yam, Zheng Kai, and Pan Binlong. It was released during the New Year holiday period in China.

== Plot ==
Ma Xiao is a Chinese foreign correspondent working abroad in a region experiencing political instability and armed conflict. In addition to reporting, he participates in distributing supplies to local residents. At the beginning of the film, Ma Xiao completes a video report in which he distributes mobile phones to civilians. Shortly afterward, he receives notice from his employer that he has been laid off.

Ma Xiao's colleague, Lao Tian, is also a foreign correspondent stationed in the same region and appears to hold a senior position. Pan Wenjia, Ma Xiao's wife, is a volunteer doctor who is nearing the end of her overseas assignment and is preparing to return home. At this time, she is twenty weeks pregnant.

Miao Feng, a communications engineer working overseas, is responsible for maintaining a local signal base station. After discovering a malfunctioning indicator light at the station, he decides to inspect and repair the issue personally. Prior to departing, Miao has seen news reports indicating that armed groups have assassinated a local deputy mayor, suggesting that the security situation has significantly deteriorated. Despite this, he travels alone to the base station without notifying others or making additional preparations.

Ma Xiao insists on accompanying Miao Feng and brings Pan Wenjia along. During this period, unrest escalates in the area. While Pan Wenjia is transporting an injured child in an ambulance back to the hospital, she is abducted by armed individuals. Shortly afterward, Ma Xiao and Miao Feng are also kidnapped while attempting to return.

The kidnappers are later identified as impostors rather than members of the main armed faction operating in the region. Miao Feng recognizes this and initiates an escape attempt with Ma Xiao. The two successfully flee but encounter difficulties when their vehicle runs out of fuel before they can reach safety.

While searching for gasoline, Miao Feng attempts to refuel a vehicle found by the roadside. During this process, he accidentally steps on a landmine, which detonates and kills him. Ma Xiao survives the explosion.

Following Miao Feng's death, Ma Xiao returns alone to the village where the earlier kidnapping occurred. Local villagers provide him with shelter and assistance. It is stated that armed groups in the area are actively capturing foreigners in order to demand ransom payments.

During this time, Ma Xiao becomes involved in agricultural work with the villagers, including helping them cultivate tomatoes. He remains in the village while conditions outside continue to be dangerous.

Later, Ma Xiao leaves the village and travels to a market in an attempt to obtain gasoline. Before securing fuel, he becomes involved in an encounter with armed individuals. During this encounter, a satellite phone belonging to Zhou Weijie, a Chinese businessman, is taken. This incident leads to Zhou Weijie becoming implicated and subsequently captured.

Ma Xiao, Zhou Weijie, and others are then taken hostage by armed militants. While in captivity, they are threatened and coerced into contacting their families in order to demand ransom payments.

== Cast and characters ==
- Xiao Yang as Ma Xiao, a foreign correspondent.
- Qi Xi as Pan Wenjia, a volunteer doctor and Ma Xiao's wife.
- Simon Yam as Zhou Weijie, a Chinese businessman encountered during the crisis.
- Zheng Kai as Miao Feng, an engineer tasked with repairing a signal base station.
- Pan Binlong as Lao Tian, a colleague of Ma Xiao.
- Fathi Anouar Ghammam as Latif.

== Release ==
Escape from the Outland It was released on 31 December 2025

== Reception ==
Escape from the Outland opened in Chinese cinemas on December 31, 2025, as part of the New Year holiday film lineup. The film attracted attention in Chinese media for its serious subject matter and realism. It was noted in state‑affiliated coverage that the film was one of more than ten new releases available to audiences over the three‑day holiday period. Escape from the Outland was described as not merely a survival story but also an exploration of ordinary people's resilience and sense of responsibility amid extreme conditions, and its production was highlighted for using IMAX cameras and striving to recreate authentic details.

Domestic reporting following the film's release noted audience reactions during post‑screening events in cities such as Shenzhen and Guangzhou. According to these reports, viewers described the escape and survival narrative as immersive and emotionally affecting, with some calling it a strong candidate for a “must‑see” holiday film and recommending it to friends and family. Elements such as the film's ending theme were also specifically mentioned as resonating with audiences.

In advance of release, early screenings and point‑of‑sale preview events generated positive feedback from attendees, with some viewers commenting on the film's pacing, character portrayals, and intense survival sequences. These early reactions emphasized the visceral experience of watching the film and noted its strong sense of presence and realism.
