= We Girls (film) =

2025 film directed by Feng Xiaogang

- Theatrical release poster
- Simplified Chinese: 向阳·花
- Literal meaning: Sunny Flowers
- Hanyu Pinyin: Xiàngyáng·huā
- Directed by: Feng Xiaogang
- Written by: Xia Longlong; Chong An
- Produced by: Zuo Yi
- Starring: Zhao Liying; Lan Xiya; Chuai Ni; Naomi Wang; Cheng Xiao
- Cinematography: Florian Zinke
- Edited by: Fan Zhaoshuo
- Music by: Wang Qianting
- Production companies: Mayla Media; Such A Good Film; Lian Ray Pictures; iQIYI Pictures (Beijing)
- Release date: April 4, 2025
- Running time: 124 minutes
- Country: China
- Language: Mandarin
- Box office: US$29 million

We Girls (Chinese: 向阳·花) is a 2025 Chinese crime drama film directed by Feng Xiaogang. It stars Zhao Liying, Lan Xiya, Chuai Ni, Naomi Wang, and Cheng Xiao as a group of female prisoners who rebuild their lives after reentering society. The film was released in China on April 4, 2025.

== Synopsis ==
In order to buy a CN¥200,000 cochlear implant for her daughter, Gao Yuexiang takes a desperate risk and ends up being sentenced to prison. Through this experience, she meets Heimei, Deng Hong, Hu Ping, and Guo Aimei. Though each of them has a different personality, they all share a defiant attitude toward life, refusing to give in or accept fate. Together, they face life's challenges, support one another through adversity, and strive to live with hope and resilience.

== Cast ==
- Zhao Liying as Gao Yuexiang
- Lan Xiya as Heimei
- Chuai Ni as Deng Hong
- Naomi Wang as Hu Ping
- Cheng Xiao as Guo Aimei

== Production ==
On July 22, 2024, the production side released a concept poster, announcing that the film is directed by Feng Xiaogang and stars Zhao Liying in the lead role, and that filming is currently underway. We Girls was shot on location across various parts of Hunan, including Changsha, Zhuzhou, and Liuyang.

== Release ==
On March 3, 2025, a release date poster was unveiled, announcing that the film will be released on April 4.

== Reception ==
=== Box office ===
The film's total box office exceeded ¥100 million on April 9, 2025, six days after its release, making it the first domestic film to reach the milestone since the Chinese New Year period. As of June 19, 2026, the film had earned a cumulative global box office total of ¥230 million.

=== Critical response ===
We Girls received positive reviews for its depiction of female ex-prisoners struggling with stigma and survival in modern China. Critics highlighted the chemistry between Zhao Liying and Lan Xiya, as well as the film's blend of gritty realism and emotional storytelling, despite some implausible plot points.
