= China Newsweek =

Chinese magazine

- Type: State weekly
- Publisher: China News Service
- Founded: January 1, 2000
- Language: Chinese
- Headquarters: Beijing
- ISSN: 1673-1735
- Website: www.inewsweek.cn

China Newsweek (Chinese: 中国新闻周刊) is a Chinese news weekly published by China News Service. According to state sources, the magazine covers current affairs and political news, and officially launched on 1 January 2000 after China News Service ran a trial issue of the publication on 25 September 1999.
