= Lan Xiya =

Chinese actress and singer

- 兰西雅
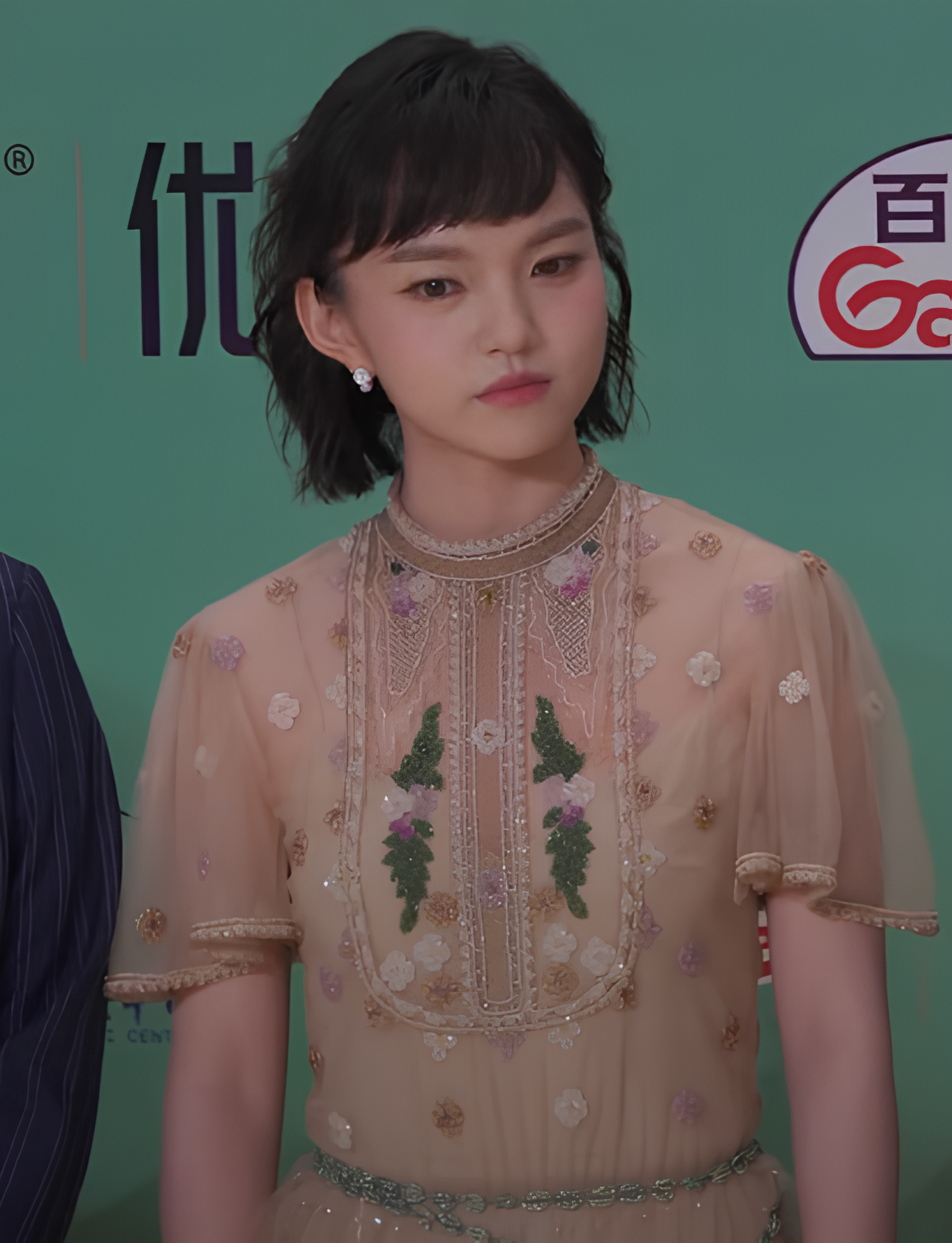
- Lan in 2025
- Born: 22 December 1998 (age 27); Enshi, Hubei, China
- Education: Wuhan University
- Occupations: Actress, singer
- Years active: 2019–present
- Height: 162 cm (5 ft 4 in)

Lan Xiya (Chinese: 兰西雅; pinyin: Lán Xīyǎ; born 22 December 1998) is a Chinese actress and singer.

== Early life ==
Born in 1998 in Enshi City in Enshi Tujia and Miao Autonomous Prefecture, Lan is of Tujia ethnicity. In 2021, she graduated from the Department of Theatre Performance at Wuhan University. Following graduation, she moved to Beijing.

== Entertainment career ==
In 2019, she participated in the music role model program The Coming One: Girls, thus officially entering into the entertainment industry. In 2020, she starred as a military nurse in the TV drama With You, which was based on real stories during the COVID-19 pandemic in China.

On 25 January 2021, she starred in the new year's comedy Vacation of Love, which was broadcast on iQiyi and Beijing Radio and Television Station. In February 2022, she starred in the sequel of Vacation of Love and sang the theme song "The 7th Star". On November of the same year, she participated in The Light of Global Domestic Products, a large-scale national economic, trade and cultural exchange program. In 2023, Lan starred in the comedy film Post-Truth, her first film role. In December of the same year, she starred in her second film, Johnny Keep Walking!, which became the third most box office-earnings of a New Year's Day film in Chinese film history.

In March 2024, Lan starred in the historical spy war drama War of Faith, which was set in the era of the Republic of China. Also on the same year, she starred as Red Guard Tang Hongjing in the Season 1 of Netflix series 3 Body Problem, which was based on the Chinese novel series Remembrance of Earth's Past by Chinese author Liu Cixin.

== Filmography ==
=== Films ===
Year	Title	Role	Ref.
2023	Post-Truth	Receptionist	
2023	Johnny Keep Walking!	He Xuan	
2024	Under One Person		
2025	We Girls	Heimei	
2025	Sound of Silence	Zhang Xiao Rui	

=== Television ===
Year	Title	Role	Notes
2020	With You	Military nurse Zhang Lin	
2021	Vacation of Love	Wen Ruonan	
2022	Vacation of Love 2	Bar singer	
2023	Till The End of the Moon	Night Phantom	
2024	War of Faith	Niu Chunmiao	
2024	3 Body Problem	Tang Hongjing	Season 1
2025	She and Her Girls	Guyu	

== Singles ==
Year	Title	Length
2021	"You Were Meant for Me"	2:59
2022	"The 7th Star"	3:44
2024	"It's No Me"	6:23

== Awards and nominations ==
Year	Award	Category	Nominated Work	Result	Ref.
2025	Shanghai Television Festival	Best Supporting Actress	She and Her Girls	Nominated	
