= Girls Always Happy =

2018 film

- Film poster
- Directed by: Yang Mingming
- Written by: Yang Mingming
- Starring: Li Qinqin
- Release date: 16 February 2018 (Berlin)
- Running time: 117 minutes
- Country: China
- Language: Chinese

Girls Always Happy (Chinese: 柔情史) is a 2018 Chinese drama film directed by Yang Mingming. It was screened in the Panorama section at the 68th Berlin International Film Festival.

== Cast ==
- Li Qinqin
- An Nai
- Zhang Xianmin
