= Against All Odds (2025 film) =

2025 Chinese film by Lau Ho-leung

- Theatrical release poster
- Traditional Chinese: 營救飛虎
- Simplified Chinese: 营救飞虎
- Literal meaning: Save the Flying Tiger
- Hanyu Pinyin: yíngjiù fēi hǔ
- Directed by: Lau Ho-leung
- Written by: Lau Ho-leung, et al
- Produced by: Yang Xiaolai; Cui Chen; Coco Xiaolu Ma
- Starring: Han Geng; Mitchell Hoog; Chen Yongsheng; Louise Wong; Philip Ng
- Cinematography: Tiger Gao, et al
- Edited by: Cheung Ka-fai, et al
- Music by: Lam Kwan Fai, Julian Chan, Billy Ng, et al
- Distributed by: Huaxia Film Distribution
- Release date: September 3, 2025
- Running time: 107 minutes
- Country: China
- Languages: Cantonese; Mandarin; English; Japanese
- Box office: US$4,712,750

Against All Odds (Chinese: 营救飞虎) is a 2025 Chinese war film that dramatically retells the rescues of eight Flying Tigers pilots, one of whom is Lt. Donald W. Kerr at the dawn of 1944, by the Hong Kong and Kowloon Independent Brigade of the East River Column. Based on true stories, the single American pilot featured is fictionalized as James Harnett, an amalgamation of American volunteers from officers to sergeants.

== Plot ==
Eight hours following the 1941 attack on Pearl Harbor, Japanese air raided Hong Kong and its army soon pressed south to occupy. In 18 days on December 25, the city fell and was soon transformed into a strategic Japanese fortress and supply hub of the Pacific War. In 1942 the Flying Tigers in their Guilin base was ready to bomb the Japanese at the Whampoa Dock. Separately, mystery man Huan Shao/Smiley with Japanese-speaking capabilities arrived in Hong Kong from Shanghai at the beginning of 1943 and was named representative of the Higashi ward, while managing a bowling alley in Wan Chai. His supervisors would like him to get rid of Lieutenant Ichijo, executioner of the deaths of 48 civilians in Blue Pool Road tragedy, before the latter would be replaced by Colonel Arima who answered to General Rensuke Isogai.

Flying Tigers Lieutenant James Harnett and peers successfully bombed Japanese targets but also civilian structures based on faulty intelligence. Later on, he was able to shoot images of a new Japanese radar station on Ho Man Tin hill, but got shot down and captured after a dogfight with Japanese Zero fighter pilot Igarashi. By spring 1944, Ichijo smuggled Harnett out of detention to the bowling alley to hold a press conference to boast, but was sabotaged by Smiley and the uncoordinated Hong Kong and Kowloon Independent Brigade of the East River Column which set out to rescue Harnett. Ichijo was killed and it turned out Smiley worked for the Chinese Communist Party and had a past deadly encounter with Arima.

As the team retreated together and prepared to go to the sea cave rendezvous point next, Harnett remembered the gun camera broken off based on his observations of the hill nearby. Because Smiley agreed with Harnett the importance of the camera that it could help reveal location of the radar station to prevent the repeat of 1939 Battle of Wilhelmshaven, they set out to get the camera. The operation succeeded with huge price, as the brigade's Dan and Sister 3 both stayed behind to stall Arima's forces, but were killed. As Smiley, Harnett and the brigade's Gutsy got pinned down by Igarashi's airpower, Smiley decided to disguise himself as Harnett by wearing the latter's jacket to draw away Igarashi and got shot to death as well. Sensing defeat, Arima shot himself in the head instead of committing seppuku, because he couldn't control the hysterical Igarashi and answer back to General Isogai. Gutsy and Harnett safely arrived at the sea cave and exchanged family gifts.

The East River Column later sent Harnett to Tuyang Wharf. After traveling to Pingshan, Huiyang and other places, Harnett returned safely to the Guilin base and was instructed by superiors to set out for Hong Kong again to bomb the radar station. This time, it was his turn to shoot down Igarashi to revenge. In October 1944, U.S. Marine Major William "Bill" O'Day thanked the East River Column, enabling intelligence sharing between the U.S. and CCP anti-Japanese units. It is revealed that the brigade rescued a total of 89 Allied and international personnel, incl. eight Flying Tigers pilot. The movie ends with comparison and contrast of historical photographs versus pictures on the film set, mentioning the role played by the Historical Records Restoration Department of the National Museum of the United States Air Force and those photos donated by Mr. Zou Dehuai.

== Cast ==
- Han Geng as Smiley/Huan Shao
- Mitchell Hoog as James Harnett
- Chen Yongsheng as Gutsy
- Louise Wong as Sister 3
- Mori Hiroyuki as Arima
- Philip Ng as Dan
- Joey Iwanaga as Iragashi
- Arai Soji as Ichijo

== Production ==
The movie is based on journals written by Lt. Donald W. Kerr. Kerr died in 1977. Years later, his sons David Kerr, Andrew Kerr found the scripts and some hand-drawn cartoons of the memoir. The journal was published in Hong Kong in 2015.

== Music ==
In addition to the original music, Dreaming of Home and Mother is also featured.

== Release ==
The movie was released on September 3, 2025, in China, commemorating the 80th Anniversary of the Victory over Japan Day (China).

== Reception ==
South China Morning Post's James Marsh gave 3 out of 5 stars, describing the film, "punches above its weight". Derek Elley of Sino-Cinema gave the film a 7/10 and called the film a "well-played, tightly constructed WW2 action movie".
