= Sheep Without a Shepherd =

2019 film by Sam Quah

- Theatrical release poster
- Traditional Chinese: 誤殺
- Simplified Chinese: 误杀
- Literal meaning: Manslaughter
- Hanyu Pinyin: wùshā
- Directed by: Sam Quah
- Written by: Weiwei Yang; Pei Zhai; Peng Li; Kaihua Fan; Yuqian Qin; Sheng Lei
- Based on: Drishyam by Jeethu Joseph
- Produced by: Chen Sicheng
- Starring: Xiao Yang; Tan Zhuo; Joan Chen
- Cinematography: Zhang Ying
- Edited by: Tang Hongjia; Zu Xinyu
- Production companies: Perfect Sky Pictures; Hengye Pictures; As One Production
- Distributed by: China Film Group Corporation
- Release date: 13 December 2019 (China)
- Running time: 112 minutes
- Country: China
- Language: Mandarin
- Box office: $199.2 million

Sheep Without a Shepherd (Chinese: 误杀; pinyin: Wù Shā; lit. 'Manslaughter') is a 2019 Chinese crime drama film directed by Sam Quah (柯汶利) and produced by Chen Sicheng. It is an official remake of the 2013 Indian Malayalam film Drishyam. The film stars Xiao Yang, Tan Zhuo, and Joan Chen.

Sheep Without a Shepherd was released in China on 13 December 2019 in conventional and IMAX formats. It became the 9th highest-grossing Chinese film in 2019, grossing US$199 million.

== Plot ==
Internet technician Li Weijie, his wife Ayu, and their two daughters Ping Ping and An An are a middle-class family living in northern Thailand. Ping Ping is sexually assaulted at a summer camp by Su Cha, who is the son of mayor Du Peng and his wife, police chief La Wen. Using this information, Su Cha blackmails Ping Ping in order to extort further sexual favours from her.

Su Cha arranges to meet with Ping Ping on her family's property, but is confronted by Ayu, who seeks to defend her daughter. After Su Cha assaults Ayu, he is accidentally killed by Ping Ping. Ayu and Ping Ping hastily bury Su Cha's body in the grave of Weijie's uncle, which is located in a local cemetery, but not before they are spotted by An An.

Weijie is informed of the murder and seeks to defend his family from police action. He disposes of key evidence, including Su Cha's car and mobile phone. He establishes an alibi for his family through an impromptu weekend holiday to the nearby area of Hua Lamphong, seeking to improve the credibility of the alibi by talking to, and reminding witnesses of his and his family's presence in key areas, as well as through collecting physical evidence such as bus tickets and invoices. Weijie also trains his family on their conduct during police interrogations.

Weijie and his family eventually come under investigation after local police officer Sang Kun, who harbors animosity towards Weijie, spots him driving Su Cha's car when it was earlier being disposed of. Sang Kun's testimony is initially met with disbelief due to his reputation for misbehaviour, but he raises La Wen's suspicion towards Weijie, which is further reinforced after Weijie reacts negatively when news of the car's discovery in a lake is mentioned. Despite intensive interrogations involving Weijie, his family, and relevant witnesses, La Wen is unable to successfully defeat Weijie's alibi.

A breakthrough in the investigation appears after Sang Kun reveals that Weijie is a crime film enthusiast. By directing police to search Wiejie's shop, La Wen is able to produce a list of films that Weijie has recently watched. Through this, she comes to the revelation that Weijie had been carefully constructing a falsified series of events through manipulating key witnesses, including restaurant owner Song En, and altering digital evidence, using his position as an internet technician to his advantage.

Convinced of Weije's guilt, but lacking the means to prove so, a frustrated La Wen resorts to extreme measures, torturing his family in order to extract a confession from An An, who, as the youngest child, is most vulnerable to coercion. In order to further establish Weijie's guilt, La Wen directs the police to publicly exhume Su Cha's body from the local cemetery. However, this action backfires when the grave is revealed to contain the corpse of a goat that had been killed by Sang Kun earlier in the film during a confrontation with Weijie. This provokes a massive riot among the local population, who are convinced of the innocence of Weijie and his family.

This event proves to be the downfall of La Wen, who is indefinitely suspended from her position over allegations of police corruption, and Du Peng, who resigns from his position as mayor in disgrace. Weijie and his family are publicly exonerated. However, Weijie, suffering guilt from his actions, confesses to his role in the killing to La Wen and Du Peng, and is sentenced to prison. It is heavily implied that Su Cha's body was earlier moved from the grave to a construction site that Weijie had been working on.

== Cast ==
- Xiao Yang as Li Weijie
- Tan Zhuo as Ayu
- Joan Chen as La Wen
- Philip Keung Ho-Man as Du Peng
- Paul Chun as Song En
- Shih Ming-shuai as Sang Kun
- Audrey Hui as Ping Ping
- Zhang Xiran as An An
- Bian Tian Yang as Su Cha

== Production ==
In September 2017, it was announced that an undisclosed Chinese production company had acquired the rights to remake the Indian Malayalam-language film Drishyam (2013). Malaysian Chinese filmmaker Sam Quah was the director and Chen Sicheng served as the producer of the film.

== Release ==
Sheep Without a Shepherd was released in China on 13 December 2019. It was also released in IMAX format.

=== Box office ===
Sheep Without a Shepherd took the top spot at Chinese box offices, becoming the highest-grossing film in its opening weekend. In that weekend, 13 – 15 December, it grossed $32,152,680 in China, besting Skyfire. The film continued to lead in Chinese box offices through to its second week, until 20 December. In its second weekend in China, the film earned $23,204,410, beating Star Wars: The Rise of Skywalker which debuted that weekend and ranked second behind Ip Man 4: The Finale. The film's cumulative gross in China stood at $76,813,388 until 22 December. In the same weekend, in terms of worldwide box office ranking, it came fifth behind Star Wars: The Rise of Skywalker, Jumanji: The Next Level, Ip Man 4: The Finale, and Frozen 2, with $77,439,509. In three weeks, the film grossed $111,225,633 and $135,589,251 in four weeks. By 13 January 2020, the film earned $154.24 million from box office sales in China alone. As of 12 February, it has grossed $176 million from China. It became the 9th highest-grossing film in China in 2019. The film grossed more than $192 million internationally.

=== Critical response ===
The film holds an approval rating of 100% on Rotten Tomatoes based on 15 reviews with an average rating of 7.3/10. It received a 73 out of 100 score on Metacritic based on five reviews.

=== Awards ===
It was nominated at the 6th Douban Film Annual Awards for the category of Top Rated Chinese Movie.
