= Yang Mingming =

Chinese filmmaker (born 1987)

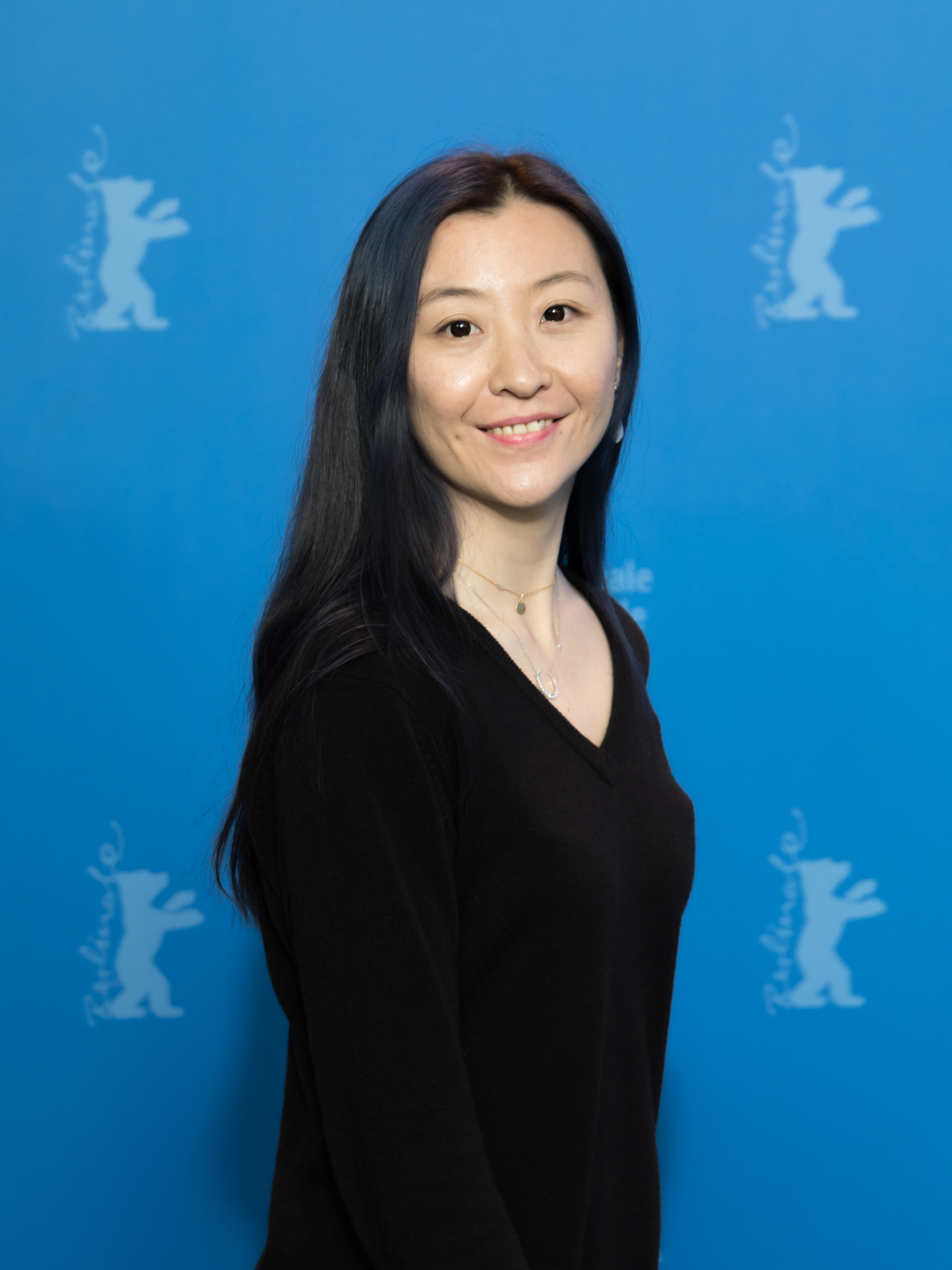
Yang Mingming

Yang Mingming (Chinese: 杨明明; born 1987) is a Chinese filmmaker. She graduated from the National Academy of Chinese Theatre Arts. Female Directors (2012) is one of her significant work.

== Early life and education ==
Yang began learning to dance at five and a half years old but she gave it up when she was sixteen. She said: “I had a grand appetite, but being a dancer requires you to control your weight. And my family was conventional, they had this concern that it would be better for me to have literacy education.”

As for film, she didn't even think of being a director in the future before she went to college, and she didn't know that the directing major would start to make films at very early in their studies. Directing used to cost her too much energy on negotiating and communicating, which she thought it might be a wrong major for her to learn it. It was only by her junior year that she began to feel that she was on the right track. There were two things influenced her to become a director: 1. Watching films every day. As it was a part of her daily assignment she gave herself, it worked very well that she found her patience on film, and further the patience of being a director. 2. French director Robert Bresson. There was a time that she spent 40 mins in biking to visit Robert Bresson's Film Exhibition in Beijing. On the way she accidentally met a torrential rain, and since then she interpreted Robert Bresson differently than anyone else. “The rain made my trip sacred.” she said, “It beautifully connected me and Robert Bresson." Robert Bresson's Mouchette (1967) greatly influenced her and later on inspired all of her works. She said: “I couldn’t stop thinking about Mouchette whenever I wrote about women and women’s agony.

== Career ==
After college, Yang Mingming didn’t have the resource to shoot a big-budget film, but she had to shoot something to become a director. She said: “It takes too much time to persuade someone to invest my film, I would rather use the time to make one.” In 2010, she came up with the idea of making a film with only one camera and two actresses. She was one of the actress, and herself alone was the entire production and post-production crew. It turned out that the Female Directors (2012) was a great success. She took the film to attend film festivals all over the country, and she got the attention from her college professor, Yang Chao. Yang Chao and his brother Yang Jing just registered a film company in 2009, he was very interested in investing young directors. Yang Mingming kept working with Yang Chao ever since then. In 2015, Yang Chao invited her to be the editor of Crosscurrent (2016). Before her, the editor was changed twice. Yang Mingming was the right one, and she contributed to the final success of the film. After Crosscurrent, Yang Mingming got to direct her first feature-length film Girls Always Happy (2018), which was supervised by Yang Chao and produced by Yang Jing.

== Filmography ==
Year	Chinese Title	English Title	Role
2012	女导演	Female Directors	Director, writer, actress, editor
2016	长江图	Crosscurrent	Editor
2018	柔情史	Girls Always Happy	Director, writer, actress, editor

== Awards and nominations ==
Year	Festival	Award	Film	Result
2016	The WIFTS Foundation International Visionary Awards	The Jury Award	Crosscurrent	Winner
2018	Berlin International Film Festival	Best First Feature Award	Girls Always Happy	Nominated
2018	Edinburgh International Film Festival	Best International Feature Film	Girls Always Happy	Nominated
2018	Edinburgh International Film Festival	Grand Prix	Girls Always Happy	Nominated
2018	Hong Kong International Film Festival	Golden Firebird Award	Girls Always Happy	Winner
2018	Hong Kong International Film Festival	FIPRESCI Prize	Girls Always Happy	Winner
2018	International Women's Film Festival Seoul	Best Director	Girls Always Happy	Winner
2018	Seattle International Film Festival	China Stars Best New Talent	Girls Always Happy	Winner
2018	Shanghai International Film Festival	Media Choice Award	Girls Always Happy	Winner
