= Lau Ho-leung =

Hong Kong filmmaker

- 劉浩良
- Born: British Hong Kong
- Education: CCC Kei Chi Secondary School, Amoy College
- Occupations: Screenwriter, Film director
- Years active: 1990s-present
- Notable work: Warriors of Future; Two Thumbs Up; Caught in Time
- Awards: § Awards and nominations

Lau Ho-leung
- Traditional Chinese: 劉浩良
- Simplified Chinese: 刘浩良
Transcriptions

Lau Ho Leung (劉浩良), Hong Kong screenwriter and film director, once studied at CCC Kei Chi Secondary School and Amoy College. Later on, he graduated from Hong Kong Baptist University's School of Communication with a major in Film and Television. His directorial debut was Two Thumbs Up (2015).

== Filmography ==
Year	Title	Director	Screenwriter	Notes/Ref.
2001	Runaway	No	Yes	
2001	Let's Sing Along	No	Yes	
2002	The New Option	No	Yes	
2002	Visible Secret 2	No	Yes	
2003	Anna in Kungfuland	No	Yes	
2004	The Attractive One	No	Yes	
2005	Dragon Squad	No	Yes	
2006	Undercover Hidden Dragon	No	Yes	
2006	Mr. 3 Minutes	No	Yes	
2007	Pandora's Booth	No	Yes	
2007	Dead Air	No	Yes	
2007	Forget Me Not	No	Yes	
2008	Painted Skin	No	Yes	
2008	Three Kingdoms: Resurrection of the Dragon	No	Yes	
2008	Missing	No	Yes	
2008	Wushu	No	Yes	
2008	Chaos	No	Yes	
2009	Ocean Killing	No	Yes	
2010	Once A Gangster	No	Yes	
2010	Bruce Lee, My Brother	No	Yes	
2010	Triple Tap	No	Yes	
2010	14 Blades	No	Yes	
2011	Mural	No	Yes	
2012	The Great Magician	No	Yes	
2014	Kung Fu Jungle	No	Yes	
2014	But Always	No	Yes	
2015	Two Thumbs Up	Yes	Yes	
2016	Three	No	Yes	
2020	Caught in Time	Yes	Yes	
2022	Warriors of Future	No	Yes	
2025	Against All Odds	Yes	Yes	

== Television ==
- ICAC Investigators 2019

== Awards and nominations ==
Year	Awards ceremony	Awards	Works	Result
2009	28th Hong Kong Film Awards	Best Screenplay	Painted Skin	Nominated
2016	35th Hong Kong Film Awards	Best New Director	Two Thumbs Up	Nominated
2016	35th Hong Kong Film Awards	Best Screenplay	Two Thumbs Up	Nominated
2022	40th Hong Kong Film Awards	Best New Director	Caught in Time	Nominated
2021	28th Hong Kong Film Critics Society Award	Films of Merit	Caught in Time	Won
2021	28th Hong Kong Film Critics Society Award	Best Film	Caught in Time	Nominated
