= Zheng Zhihua =

Taiwanese singer (born 1961)

Zheng Zhihua (simplified Chinese: 郑智化; traditional Chinese: 鄭智化; pinyin: Zhèng Zhìhuà; born 14 November 1961) is a Taiwanese singer. When he was two, he contracted polio and became permanently paralyzed from the waist down. He started his career in the late 1980s and enjoyed great success and popularity during the early 1990s in both Taiwan and mainland China. He announced his retirement in January 1999, but in 2005 he reemerged.

Zheng's most famous songs are "Sailor" (Chinese: 水手) and "Star Lighting" (Chinese: 星星点灯). His other famous songs are "33 Pieces" (Chinese: 三十三块), "Snail's House" (Chinese: 蜗牛的家), and so on.

Zheng is currently living in Taipei with his family. He frequently travels to China to perform and oversee other business interests.

== Related mandopop/rock artists/bands ==
- Angus Tung
- Cui Jian
- Dou Wei
- Tang Dynasty (band)
- Wuyontana
