= Jiang Wu =

Chinese actor

- 姜武
- Born: 4 November 1967 (age 58); Tangshan, Hebei, China
- Occupation: Actor
- Years active: 1990s–present
- Spouse: Song Yan (宋妍)
- Parent(s): Jiang Hongqi (father); Gao Yang (mother)
- Relatives: Jiang Wen (brother)

Chinese name
- Chinese: 姜武
Transcriptions
Standard Mandarin
- Hanyu Pinyin: Jiāng Wǔ

Jiang Wu (born 4 November 1967) is a Chinese actor. He starred in Zhang Yimou's To Live (1994), and Zhang Yang's Shower (1999). He is the younger brother of Jiang Wen and is or was a member of the Beijing Experimental Theatre Troupe.

== Filmography ==
- To Live (1994)
- A Beautiful New World (1998)
- Shower (1999)
- All the Way (2001)
- Roots and Branches (2001)
- One Hundred (2001)
- All the Invisible Children (2005)
- Gun of Mercy (2008)
- The Robbers (2009)
- Let the Bullets Fly (2010)
- The Warring States (2011)
- Wu Xia (2011)
- Snow Flower and the Secret Fan (2011)
- The Sorcerer and the White Snake (2011)
- 1911 (2011)
- The Founding of a Party (2011)
- Speed Angels (2011)
- Lee's Adventure (2011)
- The Floating Shadow (2012)
- Happy Hotel (2012)
- Very Kidnappers (2012)
- A Touch of Sin (2013)
- Love at First Sight (2014)
- Bull Brothers (2014)
- Temporary Family (2014)
- Love on the Cloud (2014)
- Let's Get Married (2015)
- The Queens (2015)
- Lovers and Movies (2015)
- Monster Hunt (2015)
- Shock Wave (2017)
- The Mysterious Family (2017)
- Wrath of Silence (2017)
- My People, My Country (2019)
- The Eight Hundred (2019)
- Only Love Is Able to Remedy Us (2019)
- The Legend Hunters (2025)
- Evil Unbound (2025)
