= Chopstick Brothers =

Chinese musical duo

Chopstick Brothers 筷子兄弟
- Genre: C-pop
- Occupations: Actors; C-pop duo
- Years active: 2007–current
- Members: Xiao Yang; Wang Taili

Chopstick Brothers are a Beijing-based Chinese duo who became known online by their 2010 viral video Old Boys. In 2014, they wrote, directed, and starred in a full feature film Old Boys: The Way of the Dragon based on the viral video. The promotional song of the film, "Little Apple", also became popular online, winning the "International Song Award" at the American Music Awards of 2014. They re-released the song in late 2014 to feature the popular K-pop group T-ara.

== Members ==
- Xiao Yang (b. 1980/4/7 in Chengde, Hebei)
- Wang Taili (b. 1969/6/1 in Shandong)

== Filmography ==
- Old Boys (2010)
- Fake Fiction (2013)
- Old Boys: The Way of the Dragon (2014)
- Dragon Blade (2015)
- The Amazing Race China 2 (2015; as themselves; finished in third place)
- Detective Chinatown (2015; Xiao Yang only)
- Super Express (2016; Xiao Yang only)
- Detective Chinatown 2 (2018; Xiao Yang only)
- Sheep Without a Shepherd (2019; Xiao Yang only)
- Detective Chinatown web series (2020; Xiao Yang only)
- Endgame (2020)
- Detective Chinatown 3 (2021; Xiao Yang only)
- Sister (2021; Xiao Yang only)
- Never Say Never (2023; Xiao Yang only)
- The Volunteers: To the War (2023; Xiao Yang only)

== In video games ==
"Little Apple" appears in 舞力全开2015 (Chinese version of Just Dance 2015).
