= Naomi Wang =

Chinese singer (born 1992)

Wang Ju
- Born: September 1, 1992 (age 33); Shanghai, China
- Other name: Naomi Wang
- Occupations: Singer, actress
- Years active: 2018–present
- Musical career
- Genres: Mandopop

Chinese name
- Chinese: 王菊
Transcriptions
Standard Mandarin
- Hanyu Pinyin: Wáng Jú

Wang Ju (Chinese: 王菊; pinyin: Wáng Jú; born September 1, 1992), as known as Naomi Wang, is a Chinese singer. She participated in the 2018 Chinese reality television show Produce 101 and rose to fame quickly due to her individualistic and unique style.

== Early life ==
Wang was born in Shanghai, China. She loved dancing since she was a child, so her parents sent her to the Children's Palace to learn dance. She studied in Shanghai No. 3 Girls' High School. When she was 15 years old, she forfeited her entrance to an art college due to an accident whereby her body lost shape due to the use of hormones. She studied at Shanghai Normal University, majoring in art education. After graduating from college, she has worked as a primary school teacher, trainer, and headhunter.

== Career ==
=== 2017: Pre-debut ===
In February 2017, Wang joined esee model management (Shanghai Yingmo Culture Development Co., Ltd.) and became a field agent, mainly responsible for interviewing with models, helping to deal with problems between models and clients, and she is also responsible for translation, team performance, backstage management during fashion week, follow-up rehearsal, etc. before becoming a model manager.

=== 2018: On-screen debut ===
In 2018, she participated in Tencent Video's Produce 101 as trainee. During this period, not only did she participate in singing the theme song "Produce 101" of the same name, but also co-written and sang "Mulan Says" with her teammates. However, she was eliminated from the show on the final episode ranking 15 in place. On, July 6, she participated in Zhejiang Television's Keep Running Carnival and paired up with Chen He to do a mini talk-show "贤言菊语".September 14, the promotional song "Aiya Aunt" for the film "Hello, Mrs. Money" was officially released. On September 10, she participated in the 2019 New York Fashion Week. On October 26, she won Ifeng Fashion Choics's Personality Pioneer Award. On November 4, she participated in "Perfect Restaurant" as a regular member. On November 26, she released her first English single "WORK FOR ME".

=== 2019–present ===
==== 2019 ====
On January 17, she released her highest-charting single "Te Quiero" which spend 11 weeks in the China Top 40. On January 11, she and Li Zixuan, Liu Renyu, Gao Yingxi, Qi Yandi, Lu Xiaoyu and Kimberley Chen formed a temporary group as "Breeze Girls" and sang the theme song "Breeze" for the movie "The New King of Comedy". In May, she participated in Hunan Television's Day Day Up as a guest. On August 14, she received the award for Beijing Pop Music Award as Best Newcomer of the Year. On December 19, her first movie with her as the main lead "Ladies in Beijing was released on Youku.

==== 2020 ====
On February 23 she participated in Dragon Television's Top Funny Comedian Season VI as a guest.

Currently, she is attending New York Film Academy in Los Angeles.

== Discography ==
=== Singles ===
Release date	Title	Remarks
October 9, 2018	Aiya Aunt (哎呀姑妈)	Promotional song for the movie "Hello, Mrs. Money" (李茶的姑妈)
December 3, 2018	WORK FOR ME	
January 17, 2019	Te Quiero	In both Chinese and English (Written & Composed by Adam Featherstone, Mike Macdermid, Charlotte Churchman & David Brant)
February 3, 2019	I Like You (我喜欢你)	
August 7, 2019	Valuable / Not In Vain (不枉)	The Untamed OST (陈情令国风音乐专辑)
September 19, 2019	When the Flower Blooms (每一次花开)	
November 15, 2019	The Reason Why (告白之夜)	With violinist Ayasa
December 19, 2019	Bitterness Ends and Happiness Starts (苦尽甘来)	Theme song for the movie "Ladies in Beijing: Queen Manager" (北京女子图鉴助理女王)
January 8, 2020	爆运 Disco	With Wang Linkai

== Filmography ==
=== Film ===
Year	Title	Role
2019	Gone With The Light	Chopstick Girlfriend
2019	Ladies in Beijing: Queen Manager	Chen Xiangmei
2025	We Girls	Hu Ping

=== Television shows ===
Year	Title	Network	Description
2018	Produce 101	Tencent Video	Contestant; Finished 15th
2018	Perfect Restaurant	Youku	
2019	I Got You	Hunan Television	Guest on Episode 8 and Episode 11
2019	Day Day Up	Hunan Television	Guest

=== Reality shows ===
Year	Title	Chinese title	Note	Ref.
2020	Super Penguin League; Season:3	超级企鹅联盟super3	Manager; Live Basketball Competition	
