= Cheung Tze-keung =

Hong Kong gangster (1955–1998)

- 張子強
- Born: 7 April 1955; Yulin, Guangxi, China
- Died: 5 December 1998 (aged 43); Guangzhou, Guangdong, China
- Other name: Big Spender (大富豪)
- Occupation: Gangster
- Known for: Kidnapping Walter Kwok and Victor Li

Cheung Tze-keung
- Traditional Chinese: 張子強
- Simplified Chinese: 张子强
Transcriptions
Standard Mandarin
- Hanyu Pinyin: Zhāng Ziqiáng
Yue: Cantonese
- Jyutping: Zoeng1 Zi2-koeng4

Cheung Tze-keung (Chinese: 張子強, 7 April 1955 – 5 December 1998) was a Hong Kong gangster also known as "Big Spender" (Chinese: 大富豪; Jyutping: daai6 fu3 hou4; pinyin: dà fùháo). He was a kidnapper, robber, arms smuggler and was wanted for murder. He masterminded the abduction of Walter Kwok and Victor Li Tzar-kuoi, son of Li Ka-Shing.

He was sentenced to death by a court in Guangzhou and was executed by a firing squad on 5 December 1998.

== Biography ==
Cheung was born in Yulin, Guangxi province, and moved to Hong Kong with his family at the age of four.

He acquired the nickname "Big Spender" for his love of lavish living. Cheung created a self-image for himself of a "likeable rogue with a heart of gold," and gave his friends and strangers gifts funded from a crime spree that brought in at least HK$2 billion.

=== Criminal life ===
Cheung partnered with Yip Kai-foon in a series of armed robberies. On 22 February 1990, he raided Kai Tak Airport where he hauled a HK$30 million consignment of Rolex wristwatches. On 12 July 1991, Cheung returned to Kai Tak, where he robbed a security van, netting HK$167 million, Cheung was arrested in September 1991 and jailed for 18 years for the security van heist. However, he was acquitted and released after appeal in June 1995 when the judge ruled there was no case against Cheung as the evidence was filled with too many inconsistencies and the security guard who initially identified him recanted his testimony. His associate Yip, however, was sentenced to 41 years in jail.

==== Kidnappings ====
On 23 May 1996, he kidnapped Victor Li Tzar-kuoi, son of Li Ka-Shing, and on 29 September 1997, he kidnapped Walter Kwok, chairman of Sun Hung Kai Properties. He reportedly reaped HK$1.038 billion in ransom money from Li Ka-shing, and HK$600 million for Walter Kwok. Cheung admitted he followed Li Tzar-kuoi, then held him hostage in the Li's own house for three days until the ransom was paid. It was believed at the time that these ransoms would merit an entry into the Guinness Book of World Records.

Cheung fled to China in January 1998 after failing to kidnap Chief Secretary for Administration Anson Chan, in retaliation for the jailing of his associate, Yip Kai-foon. Acting on a tip-off, the police discovered 818 kg of explosives in Sheung Shui, a part of Hong Kong, in January 1998 which they attributed to a plan by Cheung to bomb government buildings. Cheung allegedly acquired 960 kg of explosives in 1997 for $200,000 from a man in Macau, the stock was transported to Hong Kong and buried in a deserted container parking area.

Cheung had already fled to Guangdong province in January 1998 under an assumed name, having bribed the police there. He was arrested in August 1998, and his gang of 35 were rounded up by mainland police. Among his gang members were 17 Hong Kong residents and 14 mainlanders.

It was reported at the time of his capture that Cheung planned to kidnap Macau gambling magnate, Stanley Ho. Cheung is known to have lost at least $200 million in Ho's Macau casinos, once losing over $25 million in just one session at the casino.

=== Criminal trial ===
Cheung and his gang were tried in connection with a number of crimes including the kidnapping of two Hong Kong tycoons, who remained unnamed in the trial (some reports suggested one victim was Victor Li).

The trial was held in Guangzhou even though the events occurred in Hong Kong. Cheung's lawyer, and other constitutional experts, lobbied the government for the trial to be transferred to Hong Kong, but they were rejected.

The Guangzhou Municipal People's Prosecutor formally charged Cheung and his 35 followers with a series of charges relating to "cross-boundary crime including illegal possession, transporting and smuggling explosives and firearms, robbery and kidnapping". The charges, which were denied by Cheung, included the abduction in 1993 for a four million yuan ransom of a Fujian merchant who had only come forward after Cheung's arrest. The trial began on 8 October 1998. It was reported that Cheung made a full confession on the first day of the trial.

On 12 November 1998, Cheung was convicted and sentenced to death. The South China Morning Post (SCMP) explicitly reported the method of execution as firing squad, while other international outlets defaulted to notice that capital punishments in mainland China were typically carried out by shooting a single bullet to the back of the head. The SCMP is a newspaper of record for Hong Kong and, as far as judicial transparency is concerned, Chinese courts have historically restricted access to rulings and details of executions, with selective disclosure through controlled domestic channels.

Cheung was executed on 5 December 1998 at the age of 43, along with Hong Kong gang members Chin Hon-sau (42) and Chan Chi-ho (36), and mainland members Ma Shangzhong (33) and Liang Hui (32); in Guangzhou, southern China.

==== Legal controversy ====
The trial of a Hong Kong resident in Mainland China engendered a crisis of faith in the judicial independence of Hong Kong, explicit in the Hong Kong Basic Law that had been implemented after the United Kingdom transferred sovereignty to the People's Republic of China in 1997. Grave concerns were expressed by the Hong Kong Bar Association that the Mainland had no jurisdiction over crimes committed in the territory by Hong Kong residents as a matter of Mainland law; the Hong Kong public were concerned that if they commit a crime in Hong Kong, they might have to stand trial in the mainland if arrested there. However, the Chinese Government argued that though the crimes were carried out in Hong Kong, they had been planned in the mainland, so the PRC was entitled to exercise jurisdiction over the case. Under the Chinese Criminal Code, a Chinese national can be tried by a mainland court for crimes committed outside China if the offence warrants imprisonment of three years or more. Officials believed that although a "meagre part" of Cheung's case involved the mainland, it was right he be tried there.

Grenville Cross, Director of Public Prosecutions of Hong Kong, said in a letter that the mainland judiciary could not return Hong Kong residents to Hong Kong before they had been tried for crimes allegedly committed on the mainland. Cheung's lawyer suggested there probably would have been insufficient evidence to convict his client in Hong Kong without victims' statements.

The failure of the victims to report the case to the Hong Kong Police had left them bereft of evidence to request the repatriation of Cheung. Hong Kong Secretary for Security Regina Ip regretted that the tycoons had reported the abductions to the PRC and not to the Hong Kong authorities. She said there was no formal cross-border agreement on the transfer of offenders, but said that it would not be unprecedented to do so. Legal experts suggested that Hong Kong courts would not be able to convict in the absence of witness or victims' testimonies or other evidence, even with a full confession, as confessions can be withdrawn. Apple daily reported that the Li families could get their revenge on Cheung since a trial in the mainland could guarantee the death penalty, whereas capital punishment was not in force in Hong Kong.

== Cultural influences ==
Fictionalized accounts of Cheung's kidnapping of the wealthy have been made into movies:

- Operation Billionaires (驚天大賊王, 1998), portrayed by Simon Yam.
- Big Spender (轟天綁架大富豪, 1999), portrayed by Ray Lui Leung-Wai.
- Trivisa (樹大招風, 2016), portrayed by Jordan Chan
- Chasing the Dragon II: Wild Wild Bunch (追龍II：賊王, 2019), portrayed by Tony Leung Ka-fai
