= 何日君再來 =

何日君再來, lit. 'When will you come again?', may refer to:

- Au Revoir, Mon Amour, 1991 Hong Kong film starring Anita Mui, Tony Leung Ka-fai, Norman Chui and Kenneth Tsang
- Till the End of Time, 1966 Hong Kong film starring Jenny Hu and Lily Ho
- When Would You Come Again, 1999 Taiwanese television series starring Di Ying
- "When Will You Return?", 1937 Mandarin song first sung by Zhou Xuan
