= King of Robbery =

1996 Hong Kong film by Billy Chung

- DVD cover
- Traditional Chinese: 悍匪
- Simplified Chinese: 悍匪
- Hanyu Pinyin: Hàn Fěi
- Jyutping: Hon2 Fei2
- Directed by: Billy Chung
- Screenplay by: Sammy Lau; Lee Po-cheung
- Produced by: Benny Chan
- Starring: Simon Yam; Anita Lee; Roy Cheung; Marco Ngai; Chin Ka-lok; Bowie Lam
- Cinematography: Wong Po-man
- Edited by: Chun Yu
- Music by: Sam Leung; Miu Siu-kei
- Production company: Wang Fat Film Production
- Distributed by: Newport Entertainment
- Release date: 5 October 1996
- Running time: 85 minutes
- Country: Hong Kong
- Language: Cantonese
- Box office: HK$4,695,845

King of Robbery is a 1996 Hong Kong action film directed by Billy Chung and starring Simon Yam. The film is based on the story of notorious gangsters Yip Kai Foon, who is portrayed in the film as Chan Sing by Yam.

== Plot ==
Convict Chan Sing (Simon Yam) escapes from an asylum in Kwai Chung with the help of his underlings Leung (Marco Ngai) and Hak (Philip Keung), killing the police officers who are in charge of watching him and evades arrest by hoping onto the speedboat of another underling, Wo (Roy Cheung). They meet with goldsmith Boss Chung and strike a deal to rob gold jewelry shops and split the shares. When his underlings bring him to their apartment, Sing notices Fan (Anita Lee) living next door and is attracted to her. Sing then purchases firearms from Hak's cousin, Darky, which include an AK-47, which Sing gains a fondness to. Sing later accepts two new underlings, Chung (Chin Ka-lok) and Sing but not before testing whether they are undercover police officers by beating them up. The next day, Wo brings Chung to witness the former killing a traitor who caused Sing to be arrested.

Sing, armed with his AK-47, leads his gang to rob five gold jewelry shops on Man Wah Street which leads to a major gunfight killing multiple policeman. Hot-tempered police inspector Lee (Bowie Lam) becomes determined to arrest Sing. While Sing was hanging in a nightclub with his gang, Chung, who turns out to be an undercover cop, sneaks out to call his boss, Officer Cheung, but Lee and his subordinate, Man, arrive at this time and harass Chung, unaware of his true identity. Wo and Hak notices and hold Lee and Man with knives and take their pistol while Sing taunts them and handcuffs Lee.

Later, after robbing another gold jewelry shop, Sing blows up an unmarked police car with a grenade and this time, Lee manages to find Sing and his gang's apartment hideout where he gives chases with his squad and exchanges gunfire with Sing and his gang. Eventually, Sing kills Chung in front of Lee, having known of his identity as a cop all along, before fleeing. Lee and squad starts tailing Sing and his gang, who then kills Boss Chung and stealing all his gold, so the police raises a bounty which was originally HK$500,000 to HK$1 million to catch Sing.

Due to the public attention he attracted, Sing hides in a presidential suite hotel with his gang and Fan, whom he is in a relationship with. Wo, who is traveling to China with Darky to get more firearms, is unable to make it to Beijing due to many police surrounding. Lee orders Man to keep an eye of Wo, who gets into an argument with Sing due to his lack of patience. Sing then leaves Fan to prepare for his next robbery. He goes to Darky for more firearms, but Sing has become increasingly paranoid and suspects Darky will turn him in for the bounty and kills Darky. Sing and his gang rob an armoured truck in Kwun Tong where Lee and his squad follows, leading to a major gunfight between the robbers and the police where Hak is killed, so Sing and his gang drive the armoured truck away while the police corners them in a car park, where the gunfight resumes. Eventually, Wo tries to drive the armoured truck to flee but Sing shoots him dead. Seeing what happened, Leung hops on the truck and drives it away but Sing catches up and gets on. Leung then rants how Sing does not care about his underlings and shoots him, but Sing shoots Leung back and kills him. Unable to restart the engine, Sing gets off the truck and Lee holds him at gunpoint before they both fire at each other and Sing runs and jumps into the water where he was never seen again and is rumored to be living in an asylum in the United States.

== Cast ==
- Simon Yam as Chan Sing (陳星), who is based on Yip Kai Foon. Sing had a rough childhood, where his father went bankrupt after being scammed of his gold jewelry shop, so his mother brought him to the United States where she remarried. Growing up without a father, Sing develops schizophrenia and was placed at an asylum for three years. Afterwards, he returned to Hong Kong in 1993 and threatened the man who scammed his father and was arrested and placed in an asylum again, where he escapes at the beginning of the film.
- Anita Lee as Fan (阿芬), a waitress at a seafood restaurant who lives next to Ding's apartment and starts a relationship with.
- Roy Cheung as Wo (阿和), Sing's underling who is impatient and power-hungry.
- Marco Ngai as Leung (阿良), Sing's underling who is calm but brutal.
- Chin Ka-lok as Chung (阿忠), a newbie in Sing's gang who is an undercover police officer.
- Bowie Lam as Inspector Lee (李Sir), a hot-tempered, but wise police officer who is determined to arrest Sing.
- Philip Keung as Hak (克仔), Sing's underling who is the driver of the gang.
- Jason Pai as Officer Chu (朱Sir), Lee's superior officer.
- Cherie Chan as a prostitute who Hak calls to service him.
- Raymond Yu
- Hung Chi-sing
- Chiu Kwok-choi
- Kong Foo-keung
- Ah Chai
- Siu Dou
- Sin Po-ming
- Calvin Lee
- Choi Kin-sing as a policeman.

== Reception ==
=== Box office ===
The film grossed HK$4,695,845 at the Hong Kong box office during its theatrical run from 5 to 24 October 1996.

=== Critical response ===
Andrew Saroch of Far East Films gave the film a score of 2/5 stars, praising the performances of Simon Yam and Roy Cheung as well as Chin Ka-lok's action choreography, but criticizes its amateurish production and underdeveloped characters.

== See also ==
- Trivisa, a 2016 film starring Richie Jen as Yip Kai Foon.
