= Happy Go Lucky (1987 film) =

1987 Hong Kong film by Lee Tim-sing

- Traditional Chinese: 開心快活人
- Simplified Chinese: 开心快活人
- Hanyu Pinyin: Kāixīn Kuàihuórén
- Directed by: Lee Tim-sing
- Written by: Deng Weixiong
- Produced by: Zou Ding'ou
- Starring: Tony Leung Chiu-wai; Kara Hui; Clarence Fok; Betty Mak; Yammie Lam
- Cinematography: Rumjahn, Abdul Mohamed
- Edited by: Yao Chung Chan
- Music by: Gam Cheung Chow
- Production company: Orange Sky Golden Harvest
- Distributed by: Star China Media
- Release date: 21 May 1987 (British Hong Kong)
- Running time: 89 minutes
- Country: British Hong Kong
- Languages: Cantonese; Mandarin

Happy Go Lucky (Chinese: 開心快活人) is a 1987 Hong Kong romantic comedy directed by Lee Tim-sing and starring Tony Leung Chiu-wai, Kara Hui, Clarence Fok, Betty Mak, and Yammie Lam. It was produced by Orange Sky Golden Harvest. The film premiered in British Hong Kong on 21 May 1987.

== Cast ==
- Tony Leung Chiu-wai as Wei
- Kara Wai as Jackie
- Clarence Fok as Kang
- Betty Mak
- Yammie Lam

=== Others ===
- Hung Wah Leung
- Danny Summer as Henry Ma
- Kwan Hoi-san
- Yanzi Shi
- Siu Ping Cheng
- Wang Ban Poon
- Maria Chan
- Lap Ban Chan
- Kuo Hua Chang
- Bo-San Chow as Suzie
- Tau Chu
- Wai-Jan Koo
- Shirley Kwan
- Sam Lee
- Tim-Sing Lee
- Hung Wah Tony Leung
- Hsin Liang
- Kei Mai
- Tsui-Han Mak
- Bruce Mang
- Danny Poon
- Yee Seung
- Tai Wo Tang
- Tien Tsai Wei
- Chi-Keung Wong
- Kam Bo Wong
- Man Shing Wong
- Siu Ming Wong
- Yat Boon-Chai
- Hsiang Lin Yin

== Release ==
Happy Go Lucky was released on 21 May 1987, in British Hong Kong.
