= Flaming Brothers =

1987 Hong Kong film by Joe Cheung

- Film poster
- Traditional Chinese: 江湖龍虎鬥
- Simplified Chinese: 江湖龙虎斗
- Hanyu Pinyin: Jiāng Hú Lóng Hǔ Dòu
- Jyutping: Gong1 Wu4 Lung4 Fu2 Dau3
- Directed by: Joe Cheung
- Screenplay by: Wong Kar-wai
- Produced by: Alan Tang
- Starring: Chow Yun-fat; Alan Tang; Pat Ha; Jenny Tseng; Patrick Tse; James Yi; Philip Chan; Norman Chui
- Cinematography: Jingle Ma
- Edited by: Poon Hung
- Music by: Violet Lam; Stephen Shing; The Melody Bank; Bruton Music
- Production company: In-Gear Film
- Distributed by: Golden Harvest; Media Asia
- Release date: 30 July 1987
- Running time: 102 minutes
- Country: Hong Kong
- Language: Cantonese
- Box office: HK$15,741,778

Flaming Brothers is a 1987 Hong Kong crime action film directed by Joe Cheung. The film stars Chow Yun-fat, Alan Tang (who also produced the film), Pat Ha, and Jenny Tseng. The film was shot in Hong Kong, Macau and Thailand. The film was released theatrically in Hong Kong on 30 July 1987.

== Plot ==
Alan Chan (Alan Tang) and Cheung Ho-tin (Chow Yun-fat) are orphans wandering in the streets of Macau who have sworn a pact to live as brothers. They make ends meet by stealing what they can. One day, while Tin was stealing food in a church, he is discovered by Ho Ka-hei (Pat Ha), who encourages him not to steal, and subsequently starts to bring food to him and his friends every day. One day, Ka-hei gets adopted; she and Tin share a tearful farewell.

Alan and Tin grow up to become triad leaders. During a gang warfare, Alan and Tin kill Chiu, the underling of a major Macau triad leader Ko Lo-sei (Patrick Tse). Ko mobilizes his men to seek revenge but the strong-willed Alan strikes back. Then, the cunning Ko pretends to reconcile with Alan and provides news for Alan to traffic arms in Thailand. The arms dealer turns out to be Ko's rival, Uncle Pui, and Alan nearly loses his life. However, Alan manages to gain Pui's trust. At the same time, Alan falls in love with Jenny, a singer, and takes her back to Macau.

While Alan was in Thailand, Tin re-encounters Ka-hei in a Catholic school and after lay each other's heart bare, they get engaged. However, Ka-hei requests Tin to leave the underworld and wants to lead a peaceful life in Hong Kong. Tin summons his courage to tell Alan about this, but Alan, while preparing big business with Tin, becomes enraged. Having to choose between his lover and his brother, Tin sadly leaves Alan.

When Ko discovers that Alan returned from Thailand, he falls out with him and annexes all his purchased arms, formally declaring war with Alan. Later, Alan falls into Ko's trap and becomes encircled where his underlings are fully wiped out and Jenny is also killed from protecting him. Alan decides to single-highhandedly deal with Ko. In Hong Kong, Tin hears news of it and leaves his beloved wife and returns to Macau to fight with Ko alongside Alan in a gunfight where after a fierce battle, the trio dies together.

== Cast ==
- Alan Tang as Alan Chan
- Chow Yun-fat as Cheung Ho-tin
- Pat Ha as Ho Ka Hei
- Jenny Tseng as Jenny
- Patrick Tse as Ko Lo Sei
- James Yi as Richard Lui
- Philip Chan as Police Commissioner Chan
- Norman Chui as Chiu
- Fong Yau as Uncle Pui
- Wong Kim-fung as Tai-fung
- Lau Shung-fung as Sai-fung
- Tam Yat-ching as Uncle Mosquito
- Tam Chuen-hing as Triad boss at negotiation table
- Kam Biu as Triad boss at negotiation table
- Yue Man-wa as Triad boss at negotiation table
- Ko Hung as Brother Hung
- Pa San as Ko's bodyguard
- Steve Mak as Ko's bodyguard
- Hung San-nam as Ko's bodyguard
- Tang Tai-wo as Ko's bodyguard
- Kan Tat-wah as Inspector Law
- Soh Hang-suen as Sister Lucia
- Felix Lok as Man at convenience store
- Joe Cheung as Alan's man outside Chiu's pub
- Chun Wong as Street vendor
- Cheung Chok-chow as Bread street vendor
- Jeffrey Ho as Mr. Wong
- Sai Gwa-Pau as Resident of old folks home
- Cheung Hei as Resident of old folks home
- Chin Tsi-ang as Resident of old folks home
- Sze-to On as Resident of old folks home
- Chan Lap-ban as Resident of old folks home
- Stanley Tong as Hitman in Thailand
- Sam Wong as Hitman in Thailand
- Alex Ng as Chiu's man
- Wo Seung as Chiu's man
- Wong Chi-ming as Chiu's man
- Sing Yan as Brother Hung's man
- Yiu Man-kei as Ko's man
- Choi Kwok-keung as Ko's man
- Poon Kin-kwan as Ko's man
- Tang Chiu-yan as Ko's man
- Chan Ming-wai as Alan's man
- Chun Kwai-bo as Alan's man
- To Wai-wo as Ko's horse trainer
- Ho Chi-moon as Club customer
- Wong Ka-leung
- Wong Chi-keung

== Production ==
=== Background ===
In 1987, actor and film producer Alan Tang founded In-Gear Film Production. Its first project was Flaming Brothers.

=== Filming ===
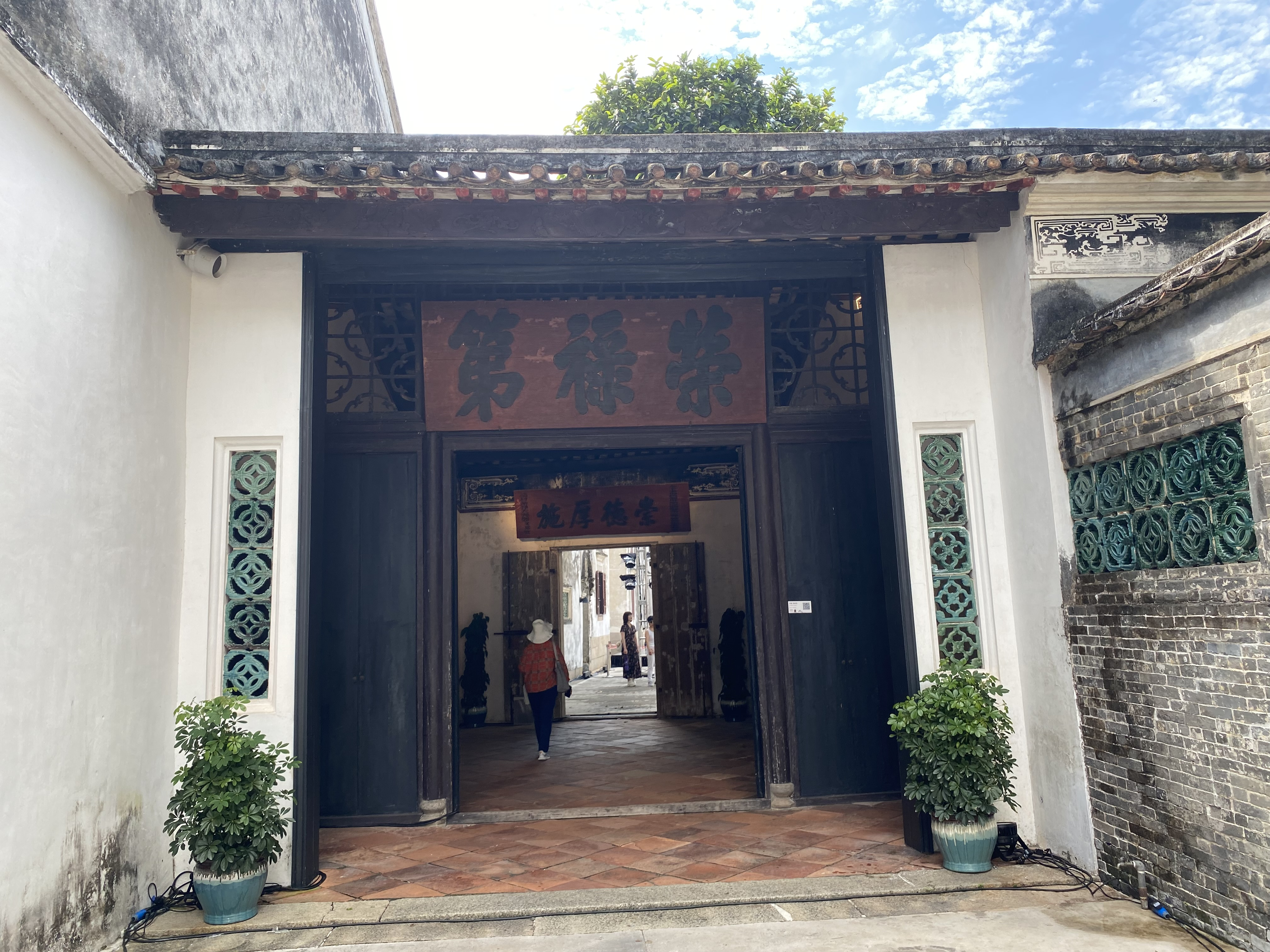
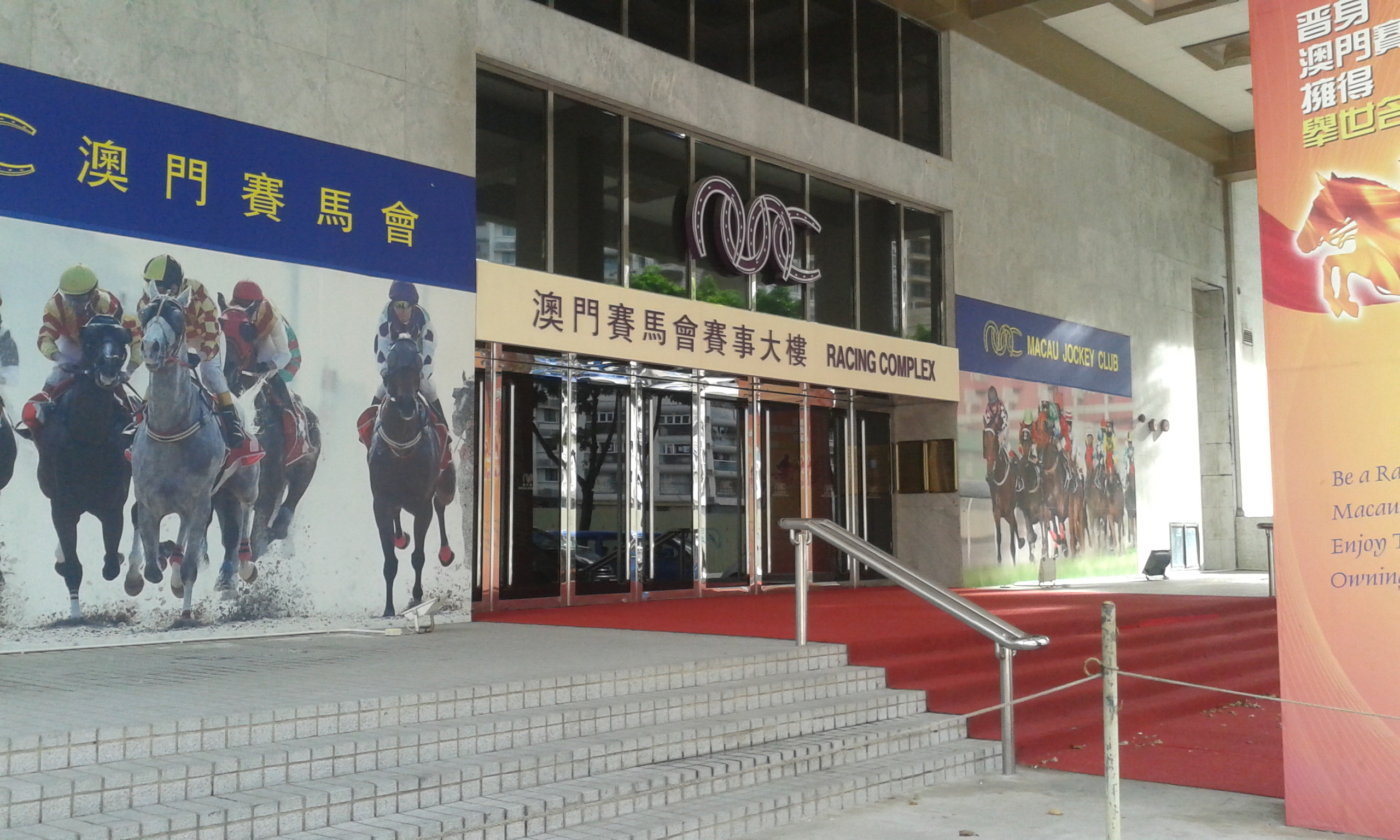
The entrance to the Mandarin's House in 2023, and the exterior of the Racing Complex building at the Macau Jockey Club in 2015

Flaming Brothers was primarily shot in Macau, with additional scenes filmed in Hong Kong and Thailand. The sequence where Chow Yun-fat entertains the residents of a retirement home was shot at the Mandarin's House. The final fight scene was filmed at the stables of the Macau Jockey Club.

== Theme song ==
- I Am Just a Person (我祇是個人)
  - Composer: Violet Lam
  - Lyricist: Calvin Poon
  - Singer: Su Rui

== Box office ==
The film was released on 30 July 1987, grossing HK$15,741,778 at the Hong Kong box office during its theatrical run.

== See also ==
- Chow Yun-fat filmography
- List of Hong Kong films
