= What a Hero! =

1992 Hong Kong film by Benny Chan

- Film poster
- Traditional Chinese: 嘩！英雄
- Simplified Chinese: 哗！英雄
- Hanyu Pinyin: Huá! Yīng Xióng
- Jyutping: Waa1! Jing1 Hung4
- Directed by: Benny Chan
- Screenplay by: Ho Tung
- Produced by: Yuen Kam-lun
- Starring: Andy Lau; Maggie Cheung; Anthony Wong; Roy Cheung; Michael Chan; Nick Cheung
- Cinematography: Cheng Siu-Keung; Wong Po-man; Patrick Chim
- Edited by: Ma Chung-yiu
- Music by: William Wu
- Production companies: Movie Impact; Chun Sing Films
- Distributed by: Golden Princess Films
- Release date: 27 February 1992
- Running time: 96 minutes
- Country: Hong Kong
- Language: Cantonese
- Box office: HK$11,534,659

What a Hero! is a 1992 Hong Kong action comedy film directed by Benny Chan and starring Andy Lau as a young Taekwondo expert from the countryside who becomes a police sergeant in the big city.

== Plot ==
Yuen Tak-wah grew up in Lantau Island where he was raised by his stepmother. He has been practicing Taekwondo since childhood and becomes an expert. One day, Wah scores a position as a sergeant at the Criminal Investigation Department (CID) in Hong Kong Island. However, Tak-wah also discovers his childhood sweetheart, Lan, who is also his mentor's daughter, is arranged to be married to her rich cousin in America, but he remains optimistic.

Tak-wah is assigned to work under Uncle Yee, leader of CID's Team One, which is rather disorganized and have not had a successful operation in a while. However, on his first day, Tak-wah strikes a rivalry with the rival Team Four leader, Inspector Cheung Yeung, who is also a Taekwondo expert and a champion of the Hong Kong Police Taekwondo Tournament. One day, Superintendent Wu assigns Team One to assist Team Four in a drug raid at a nightclub. During the operation, Tak-wah sees his colleagues (disguised as drug buyers) in dangers and rescues them by defeating the drug dealers and successfully have them arrested. Afterwards, Cheung attempts to persuade Tak-wah to join his team, but Tak-wah refuses, stating his disgust for Cheung's cocky and show-off attitude. Cheung retaliates by accusing Team One of theft and searches their office, but Tak-wah challenges him to a fight and loses, and he feels dejected. Making matters worst, Tak-wah finds out Lan's cousin has arrived when he returns home and his belittled by the latter, but Tak-wah's colleague, Saucer defends him and attracts Tak-wah's stepmother, who also attracts Saucer and they instantly fall in love. However, Tak-wah is unhappy when he finds out Saucer is courting his stepmother and ignores him.

The next day, a confidential document was a robbed by a mainland Chinese gang from the police commissioner and Officer Wu orders Uncle Yee and Cheung and they compete to crack the case. Uncle Yee arrests one of the robbers and assigns Tak-wah and Saucer to infiltrate the gang where they reconcile after Saucer stabs himself during the operation. When Saucer calls Uncle Yee for backup, Cheung taps their phone and leads his team to the gang's hideout and engages in a gunfight with some of the gang members. When Tak-wah fights the rest of the gang, Cheung refuses to back him up and Uncle Yee steps in to help him but is heavily injured after falling off a platform and Cheung takes credit for arresting the gang leader. With Uncle Yee hospitalized, Cheung is temporary in charge of Team One, much to the anger of Tak-wah, who returns home and news of his failure have spread across the village. While Tak-wah is depressed, Lan shows him the flowers she planted with seeds he gave her and he stops her from leaving to the United States with his cousin and kisses her at the pier. Uncle Yee also recovers and Tak-wah gets his determination back.

At this time, the mainland breaks their leader out of the police station armed with automatically firearms, leader to a major firefight while Tak-wah and Cheung compete to arrest the gang leader. Tak-wah gains the upper hand but Cheung attacks him from behind and taunts him to meet at the 20th Royal Hong Kong Police Taekwondo Tournament. At the tournament, both Tak-wah and Cheung make it to the finals they duel each other, with Cheung requesting to fight without protective gear, which Tak-wah agrees. Cheung dominates the first round and Tak-wah initially gains the upper hand in the second round until Saucer helps him cheat by throwing a pin on the stage which backfires when Tak-wah steps on it. Tak-wah's fellow villagers start disappointingly leaves while Lan is upset. After discussing tactics with his mentor, Tak-wah finally defeats Cheung by breaking his shine and win the championship. In the end, Tak-wah opens his martial arts school in Lantau Island, attracting many youths to register.

== Cast ==
- Andy Lau as Yuen Tak-wah (元德華), a Taekwondo expert from Lantau Island who becomes a sergeant of the Criminal Investigation Department (CID) in Hong Kong Island.
- Maggie Cheung as Lan (阿蘭), Tak-wah childhood sweetheart and lover who speaks with slight stuttering.
- Anthony Wong as Saucer (生抽王), Tak-wah's colleague who falls in love with his stepmother.
- Roy Cheung as Cheung Yeung (張揚), the arrogant inspector of CID's Team Four who was the previous Royal Hong Kong Taekwondo Tournament champion.
- Michael Chan as Pat Yee (畢義), known as Uncle Yee (義叔), Tak-wah's superior officer and leader of CID's Team One.
- Nick Cheung as one of Tak-wah's colleague in Team One.
- Paul Chun as Lan's father who is also Tak-wah's Taekwondo mentor.
- Meg Lam as Tak-wah's stepmother who was his father's mistress and raised him after his father died.
- Shing Fui-On as a postman in Lantau Island.
- Bowie Wu as Superintendent Wu (胡Sir), also known as Uncle Sau (修叔), Uncle Yee and Cheung's superior officer.
- Benz Kong as Tak-wah's colleague in Team One.
- Hsiao Ho as the leader of the mainland Chinese robbers.
- Chan Chi-fai as Brother Kin (健哥), the drug dealer arrested by Tak-wah at the nightclub
- Kam Seung-yuk as one of Cheung's subordinate.
- Lui Tat as a Lantau Island villager
- Sze Kai-keung as Kei-on (技安), a fat karate fighter and bully in Lantau Island who was defeated by Tak-wah.
- Ho Tung as Superintendent Wu's assistant.
- Patrick Hon as one of Cheung's subordinate.
- Kenny Wong as one of Cheung's subordinate.
- Benny Lam as Ngan Tai-seung (顏大常), Lan's snobbish cousin who is a rich restaurateur in the United States and is arranged to marry Lan before she was born.
- Sandy Chan
- Lee Man-kwai
- Anthony Chow
- Chang Sing-kwong
- Leung Sam as a Lantau Island villager.
- Chow Hin-cheung as a mainland Chinese robber
- Fei Pak as a policeman.

== Music ==
Song	Composer	Lyricist	Singer	Notes
What a Hero! (嘩！英雄)	William Hu	Siu Mei	Andy Lau	Theme song
Love You in My Heart, Hard to Say it Out (心中愛你口難言)	William Hu	Siu Mei	Andy Lau, Jana Ho	Insert theme

== Box office ==
The film grossed HK$11,534,659 at the Hong Kong box office during its theatrical run 27 February to 11 March 1992 in Hong Kong.

== See also ==
- Andy Lau filmography
