= Explosive City =

2004 Hong Kong film by Sam Leong

- Film poster
- Traditional Chinese: 爆裂都市
- Simplified Chinese: 爆裂都市
- Hanyu Pinyin: Bào Liè Dū Shì
- Jyutping: Baau3 Lit6 Dou2 Si2
- Directed by: Sam Leong
- Screenplay by: Sam Leong; Paul Chung
- Story by: Matsushita Junichi
- Produced by: Shin Yoneyama; Sam Leong
- Starring: Simon Yam; Alex Fong; Hisako Shirata; Sonny Chiba
- Cinematography: Edmond Fung
- Edited by: Cheung Ka-fai
- Music by: Yoshikawa Kiyoshi
- Production companies: Art Port; Same Way Production
- Release date: 4 November 2004
- Running time: 99 minutes
- Country: Hong Kong
- Languages: Cantonese; Japanese; English
- Box office: HK$346,565

Explosive City is a 2004 Hong Kong action film written, produced and directed by Sam Leong and starring Simon Yam, Alex Fong, Hisako Shirata and Sonny Chiba.

== Plot ==
Macau government official Kent Yung (Joe Cheung) who arrived in Hong Kong to attend an international conference. At the Hong Kong International Airport where he was speaking to the press, he was shot thrice by a mysterious woman (Hisako Shirata) who emerged from the crowd. As havoc ensues in the airport, Special Forces superintendent Charles Cheung (Simon Yam), whose squad was in charge of protecting Yung, gives chase to the woman who eventually falls down a building as loses her memory. This assassination attempt at the airport caused a great shock to the Hong Kong police and CID chief inspector Tim Yiu (Alex Fong) was sent to assist Cheung in the investigation. After investigation, the assassin, named Jade, belongs to an international terrorist organization. According to the information, Jade was born into a happy family in Japan, but at the age of three, she was abducted by the leader of the terrorist group, Otosan (Sonny Chiba), where she was brainwashed and trained to become an elite assassin. For this assassination attempt, she snuck into airport as a reporter in order to get close to her target.

While the Hong Kong police was spending great efforts solving the case, Otosan also secretly leads his organization into Hong Kong as he was unsatisfied with the previous assassination and plans to take action himself. Under his command, his underlings murder Yiu's wife, Monica (Chan Lik), and kidnap his son, Joe (Jacky Wong), in order to blackmail Yiu to killing Jade. Yiu helplessly executes Otosan's command and shoots and hijacks Jade, who was wearing a bulletproof vest, when she was being escorted by his team of CID, leading him to become a wanting criminal.

While avoiding being hunted by the police, Yiu also struggles to find the whereabouts of Otosan to save his kidnapped son. While on the process of pursuing Otosan with Yiu, Jade gradually regains her memory and reveals to Yiu that Otosan has planted a mole in the police force - Cheung. However, Yiu and Jade were puzzled by the question of why Cheung did not carry out the assassination of Yung since he was in charge of protecting him for his stay in Hong Kong but Jade was chosen instead.

== Cast ==
- Simon Yam as Superintendent Charles Cheung
- Alex Fong as Chief Inspector Tim Yiu
- Hisako Shirata as Jade
- Sonny Chiba as Otosan
- Edwin Siu as Jack Chan
- Crystal Kwok as Ada Chan
- Samuel Pang as Glen
- Eddy Ko as Police Commander Fung
- Lam Suet as Mendosa
- Joe Cheung as Senior Officer Kent Yung
- Alexander Chan as Officer Ken Ma
- Zac Ko as Motoki
- Wong Mei-yin as Tina
- Chan Man-lei as Uncle Suen
- Lee Lam-yan as Marco
- Roderick Lam as Ken
- Johnnie Guy as Ronald Smith
- Law Yau-kuen as Kent Yung's secretary
- Jacky Wong as Joe
- Mark Le Gartha as Basung Kawoma
- Mark Zetterlund as Luther
- Murata Hiroki as Daiki
- Ho Sze-ting as Lina
- Chan Lik as Monica
- Lau Ching-lam as Hoko Mart
- Kamiyama Norihisa as Jade's father
- Risa Kosetsuki as Jade's mother
- Lam Kwok-kit as Smith's bodyguard
- Rick Smith as Macau official
- Kawoma as Ahmed
- Alan Ng as Glen's man
- Benjamin Yuen as Glen's man
- Suzuki Taukya as Otosan's man
- Nishimura Shin as Otosan's man
- Paul Logan as Otosan's man
- Lau Tin-lung as Otosan's man
- Luk Chun-kwong as Otosan's man
- Alex Cheng as Otosan's man
- Pang Wai-ming as Tom's subordinate
- fong Chi-kui as Tom's subordinate
- Woo Shui-chuen as Tom's subordinate
- Lau Hing-kuen as Tom's subordinate
- Adam Chan as Charles's subordinate
- Vincent Chik as Charles's subordinate
- Lee Miu-mak as Charles's subordinate
- Wong Chun-man as Otosan's bodyguard
- Tony Lui as Priest
- John Cheung as Neurologist treating Jade
- Ng Kim-wai as Underground doctor
- Che Kim-fai as Macau's special force
- Luk Man-wai as Macau's special force
- Eddie Che as Macau's special force
- Wong Ho-kwan as Macau's special force
- Wong Kin-chung as Macau's special force
- Cheng Wai-kei as Airport police
- Yip Seung-hung as Airport police
- Victy Wong as Special force driver
- Lui Siu-ming as Special force driver
- Joyce as Newscaster
- Hon Ping

== Reception ==
=== Critical ===
Andrew Chan of the Film Critics Circle of Australia rated the film a score of 8.75/10 and praised the film's plot and acting and director Sam Leong's original use of camera angles and shots. LoveHKFilm praises the performances of Simon Yam, Alex Fong and Hisako Shirata, the films' pacing, tone and emotions but criticizes the inconsistent language but overall, considers the film engaging. Beyond Hollywood praises the film's action sequences but criticizes its predictable and unoriginal plot and the casting choice of Shirata.

=== Box office ===
The film grossed HK$346,565 (equivalent to $527,772 in 2020) during its theatrical run from 4 to 24 November 2004.
