= In-Gear Film Production =

Hong Kong production company

In-Gear Film Production Co., Ltd., or In-Gear Film, was a Hong Kong production company that was established by actor/film producer Alan Tang in 1987.

In-Gear has produced a number of films that Tang has either starred in or produced. This includes films such as Gun n' Rose, Return Engagement, The Black Panther Warriors and Flaming Brothers.
