= They Came to Rob Hong Kong =

1989 Hong Kong film by Clarence Fok

- Film poster
- Traditional Chinese: 八寶奇兵
- Simplified Chinese: 八宝奇兵
- Hanyu Pinyin: Bā Bǎo Qí Bīng
- Jyutping: Baat3 Bou2 Kei4 Bing1
- Directed by: Clarence Fok
- Written by: Dean Shek Creative Unit
- Produced by: Clarence Fok; Catherine Lau
- Starring: Dean Shek; Chingmy Yau; Roy Cheung; Sandra Ng; Eric Tsang; Stanley Fung; Liu Wai-hung; Chin Siu-ho; Kara Hui; Charlie Cho; Ann Bridgewater; Yammie Lam
- Cinematography: Ardy Lam
- Edited by: Wong Ming-lam
- Music by: Lowell Lo
- Production company: Cinema City
- Distributed by: Cinema City
- Release date: 23 February 1989
- Running time: 99 minutes
- Country: Hong Kong
- Language: Cantonese
- Box office: HK$8,033,844

They Came to Rob Hong Kong (Chinese: 八寶奇兵) is a 1989 Hong Kong action comedy film produced and directed by Clarence Fok and starring Dean Shek, who also serves as the film's writer and executive producer. The film co-stars Chingmy Yau, Roy Cheung, Sandra Ng, Eric Tsang, Stanley Fung, Liu Wai-hung and Chin Siu-ho.

== Plot ==
"Clarence Fok’s They Came to rob Hong Kong concerns a violent bank robber (Roy Cheung) who has to flee to the Mainland after being nearly caught by a tough cop (Kara Hui). There, he recruits a ragtag team of hapless morons (among which Eric Tsang, Stanley Fung, Sandra Ng, Dean Shek and Chin Siu Ho) to come back to Hong Kong and attempt a daring heist."

Mao Yiu-tung (Roy Cheung) is a Hong Kong criminal who escaped from a team of female cops, led by Shang (Kara Hui), to mainland China. He recruits a team to go with him to Hong Kong to rob a bank. The team consists of two conmen doctors, Ken (Eric Tsang) and Yuen (Stanley Fung), a singer named Leslie Cheung (Liu Wai-hung), a dancer and martial artist named Bruce Hung (Chin Siu-ho), and two cops, Sherlock False (Dean Shek) and Monroe (Sandra Ng). The team are mentored by Jenny (Chingmy Yau), who teaches them about Hong Kong's society and geography.

== Cast ==
- Dean Shek as Sherlock False
- Chingmy Yau as Jenny Tung
- Roy Cheung as Mao Yiu-tung
- Sandra Ng as Monroe
- Eric Tsang as Ken
- Stanley Fung as Yuen
- Liu Wai-hung as Leslie Cheung
- Chin Siu-ho as Bruce Hung
- Kara Hui as Superintendent Shang
- Charlie Cho as Biggy
- Ann Bridgewater as police officer
- Yammie Lam as police officer
- Elaine Jin as Councillor Chu
- Shing Fui-On as Dean
- Wellson Chin as Sauna manager
- Ann Mui as Inspector May
- Chan King as Rooster
- Chan Fai-hung as police informer
- Yeung Hung as Tung's thug
- Lau Tin-yue
- Jameson Lam as Dean's thug
- Yeung Jing-jing as Mao's girl
- Michelle Sze-ma
- Cheung Choi-mei as Policewoman
- Law Shu-kei as False's superior
- Tin Kai-man as Rooster's thug
