= Yammie Lam =

Hong Kong actress (1963–2018)

- 藍潔瑛
- Lam at TVB programme Stars of Jade in 1992
- Born: 27 April 1963; British Hong Kong
- Died: 31 October 2018 (aged 55); Stanley, Hong Kong
- Burial place: St. Raphael's Catholic Cemetery, Cheung Sha Wan, Kowloon, Hong Kong
- Occupation: Actress
- Years active: 1983–2004

Chinese name
- Traditional Chinese: 藍潔瑛
- Simplified Chinese: 蓝洁瑛
Transcriptions
Standard Mandarin
- Hanyu Pinyin: Lán Jiéyīng
Yue: Cantonese
- Jyutping: Laam4 Git3 Ying1

Yammie Lam Kit-ying (27 April 1963 – 31 October 2018), also known as Yammie Nam, was a Hong Kong actress and most notable for her performances in TVB drama series The Greed of Man and Looking Back In Anger, as well as in the film series A Chinese Odyssey. Lam was found dead in her apartment at Leung Ma House (Ma Hang Estate) in Stanley, Hong Kong, on 31 October 2018.

== Career ==
Lam first joined TVB in 1983, graduating from the TVB actor training class a year later along with fellow actress Margie Tsang. She was cast in a number of movies as well as TVB serials, soon becoming well known as one of the TVB's Five Beauties. She was called "the most beautiful on the five-station hill" (靚絕五台山).

In 1991, Lam played the leading female role in a Taiwanese TV series. Taiwanese actress Di Ying, who was also a member of the same series, disliked Lam. Once, Di waited for Lam in a hotel lobby and kicked her in the stomach so hard that Lam stumbled far away backwards on the floor. Lam never worked with Taiwanese companies again. Di later vividly described her assault on Lam on a Taiwanese variety show with no regret, calling her "Lam the big shot" (藍大牌), long after Lam's retirement.

In 1993, Lam won Top 10 TV Actors/Actresses at the Next TV Awards for her performance in a 1992 TV series The Greed of Man.

== Personal life ==
She was in a relationship with a Hong Kong indigenous villager Johnny Tang (鄧啟揚), but Tang committed suicide on May 25, 1986, which greatly shocked her. From November 1986 to 1987, she had a relationship with Peter Cheng Kar-shing (郑家成), a son of Hong Kong billionaire Cheng Yu-tung, but they eventually broke up.

In 1995 and 1997, Lam's parents died in succession. She broke up with her boyfriend afterwards. In September 1998, she got into a car accident. In December 1998, it was suspected that she was raped by Eric Tsang during Tsang's film production in Singapore. She had suffered from depression from April 1999 till her death. Her stage career was completely shattered by then despite her showing up in a few TV serials or movies afterwards.

Declared bankrupt in 2006, Lam subsequently lived on government welfare of HK$3,700 per month.

In March 2013, Lam was baptised as a Catholic at St. Anne's Church in Stanley and was given the Christian name Maria.

== Rape allegations ==
In December 2013, Next Magazine obtained the video of an interview with Lam, in which she said that she had been raped by two Hong Kong entertainment industry "big brothers" more than two decades earlier. Lam stated that the first man, who had raped her after consuming alcohol, had died recently. Lam alleged that another man raped her during a film production in Singapore by obtaining a key to her room, entering her room at night and rape her. She said that fears about his influence in the film industry dissuaded her from reporting the incident to the police. During the interview, the interviewer mentioned the names of the two accused rapists which was not heard but Lam acknowledged to be correct. It was noticed that portions which the interviewer mentioned the names were censored out of Next Magazine's published video; it is unknown if the edits were made by the magazine or by the interviewer. Subsequently, an anonymous source cited on Sina News corroborated the alleged rape in Singapore and claimed that the important man had announced, to the film crew, his intention of "having fun" with Lam before he allegedly broke into her room.

In January 2018, Chinese journalist Zhuo Wei uploaded what appeared to be the uncensored video of Lam's interview, which revealed the alleged rapists to be Eric Tsang and Alan Tang (deceased in 2011). A day later, the rape accusation against Eric Tsang was corroborated by Grace Han, a prominent talent agent who formerly headed the Ford Models agency in Asia. Han further alleged that Eric Tsang was a serial sexual predator, and claimed to know of a specific incident where a group of showbiz men led by Tsang drugged seven female models in a Hong Kong karaoke bar and raped six of them, while one model escaped. Tsang denied both the authenticity of the video and Grace Han's claims, and a week later, filed a defamation lawsuit at the Hong Kong High Court against Han.

Several media outlets raised concerns that the audio portion of the 2018 video could have been edited, noting that the interviewer's voice increased in pitch from a male-sounding individual in the 2013 video to a female-sounding individual in the 2018 video. However, experts suggested that the most likely explanation was that the published 2013 video was digitally altered to disguise the identity of the interviewer, and that the interviewer was in fact female. They also point out that the 2018 video contained unremoved background noises, indicating that it was either the original video or in an earlier state of edit compared to the 2013 video, which had noise cancellation. This implies that the person who leaked the video had access to the original unedited video and is most likely the interviewer herself.

== Death ==
On 3 November 2018, Lam was found dead in her apartment at Leung Ma House (Ma Hang Estate) in Stanley, Hong Kong. Police noted that she was found in a decomposing state, and she was last seen alive on 31 October. Her cause of death was unknown.

In the evening of 9 November, a requiem mass was held for Lam at St. Anne's Church celebrated by Dominic Chan Chi-ming, the vicar general of the Catholic Diocese of Hong Kong. Hundreds of fans came to pay tribute to Lam. Some actors and actresses who played in The Greed of Man attended the mass. Dicky Cheung read the Scripture and Maggie Chen gave a speech. Father Chan said that he had met Lam five years earlier, and that Lam had suffered a lot.

Lam was cremated on 15 November 2018, and her ashes were interred at the St. Raphael Catholic Cemetery in Cheung Sha Wan.

== Filmography ==
=== Film ===
Year	Title	Role	Notes	Ref.
1985	The Unwritten Law	Annie		
1986	Witch from Nepal	Ada		
1987	Happy Go Lucky	Mina		
1989	They Came to Rob Hong Kong	May		
1991	The Tigers	Wah's Wife		
1992	The Unleaded Love 花貨	Mary		
1993	The Bride with White Hair	He Ehua		
1993	Flirting Scholar	Tang's wife		
1994	A Chinese Odyssey Part One: Pandora's Box	Chunsansiniang / Spider goblin		
1994	A Chinese Odyssey Part Two: Cinderella	Chunsansiniang / Spider goblin		
1999	Aids Heart 愛滋初體驗	Ah Qian		
2002	Troublesome Night 16	Pan Jinlian		

=== Television ===
Year	English title	Chinese title	Role	Notes
1984	It's a Long Way Home	家有嬌妻	Poon Ching-man	
1984	Rainbow Round My Shoulder	畫出彩虹	Mak Yim-wan	
1984	The Return of Wong Fei Hung	寶芝林	Au-yeung Ching-ching	
1984	It Takes All Kinds	超越愛情線	Chung Suet-yi	
1984	The Return of Mischievous Lots	扭计雙星	Joe	
1984	—N/a	城市小品	Fong Ching-nung	TVB Sitcom
1985	Deadful Melody	六指琴魔	Tam Yuet-wah	
1986	Heir to the Throne Is...	真命天子	Ho Fa	
1986	A Taste of Bachelorhood	鑽石王老五	Ku Tung-sam	
1986	Turn Around And Die	英雄故事	Tung Man-ching	
1986	Next Year Next Kins	愛情寶盒	Joanne	
1989	I Do I Do	花月佳期	Monica	
1989	Looking Back in Anger	義不容情	Mui Fan-fong	
1989	War of the Dragon	還我本色	Yiu Shul-ching	
1989	The Vixen's Tale	萬家傳說	Lau Tsz	
1989	Battle of the Heart	摘星的女人	Tang Yingxin	
1989	The Final Combat	蓋世豪俠	Xue Yan	
1989	The Mamasan	霓虹姊妹花	Elaine	TVB Telemovie
1990	Lovers at the End of an Era	末代兒女情	Ma Suxin	TTV Drama
1991	Fame or Shame	情危夜合花	GiGi	TVB Telemovie
1991	Sergeant Talkie	妙探對講機	Yu Kam-man	TVB Telemovie
1991	—N/a	半生緣一世情	Li Xiuru	TTV Drama
1991	The Poor Rich Man (TVB)	橫財三千萬	Ha Hiu-man	
1992	The Greed of Man	大時代	Law Wai-ling	
1993	The Iron Body Guard	大刀王五	Wang's wife	
1993	The Art of Being Together	奇情小男人	Yuan Tianlan	
1994	Wounded Tracks	傷城記	Xue Ling	TCS Telemovie
1994	Crime and Passion	新重案傳真	Ting Lan	
2004	Love In A Miracle	愛在有情天	Sze Yu	ATV Drama
