= Return Engagement (1990 film) =

1990 Hong Kong film by Joe Cheung

- DVD cover
- Traditional Chinese: 再戰江湖
- Simplified Chinese: 再战江湖
- Hanyu Pinyin: Zài Zhàn Jiāng Hú
- Jyutping: Zoi3 Zin3 Gong1 Wu4
- Directed by: Joe Cheung
- Written by: Wong Kar-wai; Joe Cheung
- Produced by: Alan Tang
- Starring: Alan Tang; Elizabeth Lee; May Lo; Simon Yam; Andy Lau
- Cinematography: Tom Lau; Jimmy Leung; Christopher Doyle; Andrew Lau
- Edited by: Poon Hung
- Music by: Violet Lam
- Production company: In-Gear Film Production Co., Ltd.
- Distributed by: Golden Princess Amusement
- Release date: 17 March 1990
- Running time: 109 minutes
- Country: Hong Kong
- Languages: Cantonese; English
- Box office: HK$11,214,680

Return Engagement, also known as Hong Kong Corruptor, is a 1990 Hong Kong action drama film directed by Joe Cheung and starring Alan Tang, Elizabeth Lee, May Lo and Simon Yam, with a guest appearance by Andy Lau.

== Plot ==
Return Engagement tells the story of Lung (Alan Tang), a Triad boss who is sent to prison in Canada. While he is in jail his daughter is taken to Hong Kong to keep her safe. On his release, Lung travels to Hong Kong to find his daughter.

Lung spends time with Fung, a bar owner who sponsors an orphan, "Little Lung". "Little Lung" knew Lung's daughter Ka-ka while they were both in an orphanage. However, Lung and "Little Lung" run afoul of local gangsters, so Lung has to get into one final gunfight of his life.

== Alternate versions ==
The film was released on VHS in North America as Hong Kong Corruptor, featuring an unrelated scene with Chow Yun-fat. This meant to cash in on the success of American film debuts made by Asian filmmakers, such as John Woo as well as superstars such as Chow Yun-Fat.

== Cast ==
- Alan Tang as Lung Ho-tin
- Andy Lau as Wah (guest appearance)
- Simon Yam as Lee Pang
- Elizabeth Lee as Tsim Siu-fung
- Carrie Ng as Lung's wife
- Ku Feng as Uncle Hung
- Melvin Wong as Officer Wong
- Dennis Chan as Hotel manager
- May Lo as Little Lung
- David Wu as David
- Chang Yi as Toilet repairman
- Anthony Pa as Lee Pang's thug
