= Gun n' Rose =

1992 Hong Kong film by Clarence Fok

- Film poster
- Traditional Chinese: 龍騰四海
- Simplified Chinese: 龙腾四海
- Hanyu Pinyin: Lóng Téng Sì Hǎi
- Jyutping: Lung4 Tang4 Sei3 Hoi2
- Directed by: Clarence Fok
- Screenplay by: Wai Ka-fai
- Produced by: Alan Tang
- Starring: Alan Tang; Andy Lau; Leon Lai; Simon Yam; Bowie Lam; Monica Chan; Carrie Ng; Loletta Lee
- Cinematography: Ray Wong
- Edited by: Norman Wong
- Music by: Lowell Lo
- Production company: In-Gear Films
- Distributed by: Golden Princess Films
- Release date: 5 June 1992
- Running time: 99 minutes
- Country: Hong Kong
- Language: Cantonese
- Box office: HK$14,944,759

Gun n' Rose (released as Guns N' Roses in the Philippines) is a 1992 Hong Kong action film directed by Clarence Fok and starring Alan Tang, Andy Lau, Leon Lai and Simon Yam.

== Plot ==
Alan Lung is the adopted son of Taiwanese triad leader Lung Yat-fu. Alan is highly favored by Lung, who appoints him as his successor over his two biological sons Simon and Bowie. One time when Lung was shot, Alan blames Bowie, who then becomes a police informant attempting to kill Alan. Alan survives so Lung tells his second son Simon to kill Bowie while Simon also hires an assassin, Leon, to kill Alan. Alan then escapes from Taiwan to Hong Kong where he meets triad leader Andy, his girlfriend Loletta and his sister Carrie. While hiding in Hong Kong with his crippled wife Monica, Alan is dragged back into the triad life by Andy’s incessant activities and the reappearance of Leon. Finally, Alan decides to go back to Taiwan and get even with Simon.

== Cast ==
- Alan Tang as Alan Lung
- Andy Lau as Andy
- Leon Lai as Leon
- Simon Yam as Simon Lung
- Bowie Lam as Bowie Lung
- Monica Chan as Monica Shum
- Carrie Ng as Carrie
- Loletta Lee as Loletta
- Michael Chan as Brother Chicken
- John Ching as Bee
- Joey Leung as Skinny
- Tien Feng as Lung Yat-fu
- Wong Kim-fung as Fung
- Lau Shung-fung as Simon's gangster
- Adam Chan as Simon's gangster
- Hung Chi-sang as Simon's gangster
- Kwan Yung as Alan's bodyguard
- Leung Sam as Alan's gangster
- Wong Kam-tong as Alan's gangster
- Leung Kam-san as Heroin dealer
- Wan Seung-lam as Heroin dealer's thug
- Peter Ngor as Lecherous patient
- Lam Sek as Bee's gangster
- Lam Foo-wah as Bee's gangster
- Hui Si-man as Monica's mom
- Fan Chin-hung as Rival gang member

== Release ==
Gun n' Rose was released in Hong Kong on 5 June 1992. In the Philippines, the film was released by Daifuku Films as Guns N' Roses in 1993.

=== Box office ===
The film grossed HK$14,944,759 at the Hong Kong box office during its theatrical run 5 June to 18 June 1992 in Hong Kong.
