= The Black Panther Warriors =

1993 Hong Kong film by Clarence Fok

- Film poster
- Traditional Chinese: 黑豹天下
- Simplified Chinese: 黑豹天下
- Hanyu Pinyin: Hēi Bào Tiān Xià
- Jyutping: Haak1 Paau3 Tin1 Haa6
- Directed by: Clarence Fok
- Screenplay by: Tsang Kan-cheung
- Produced by: Alan Tang
- Starring: Alan Tang; Brigitte Lin; Simon Yam; Tony Leung; Dicky Cheung; Carrie Ng; Jennifer Chan; Elsie Chan; Yuen Wah; Melvin Wong
- Cinematography: Arthur Wong; Jingle Ma; Gigo Lee; Tony Cheung; William Yim; Eric Chu
- Edited by: Cheung Ka-fai
- Music by: Lowell Lo
- Production company: In-Gear Films
- Distributed by: Gala Film Distribution
- Release date: 18 November 1993
- Running time: 91 minutes
- Country: Hong Kong
- Languages: Cantonese; Mandarin
- Box office: HK$7,257,468

The Black Panther Warriors is a 1993 Hong Kong action film directed by Clarence Fok and starring an ensemble cast of Alan Tang, Brigitte Lin, Simon Yam, Tony Leung, Dicky Cheung and Carrie Ng.

== Plot ==
Black Cougar (Alan Tang) is a professional thief who charges high fees and had never made a mistake. One night, Cougar was hired by minister Chu (Melvin Wong) to steal a silver box to test the newly installed security system in the police headquarters. Panthers then assembles his team of acquaintances possessing special skills to assistant. They include dart-thrower Madam Rose (Carrie Ng), sharpshooter Mang-po Fai (Tony Leung), gambling expert and card thrower Black Jack Love (Simon Yam), computer genius Robert Parkinson (Dicky Cheung), and Cougar's junior fellow apprentice, Ching-ching (Brigitte Lin). During their operation, they realized that in order for them to activate the security system, they would need to obtain the weight of police officer Fat Wong (Sze Kai-keung) and the fingerprints of his partner Enna (Elsie Chan). When they finally obtain the fingerprints and weight of the two, Cougar proceeds to steal the silver box on his own. However, Cougar was ambushed and was abducted and trapped in a cell by his senior fellow apprentice Bloody Wolf (Yuen Wah). While Wolf was torturing Cougar, Cougar's assistant, Chan-chan (Jennifer Chan) comes to rescue him. Ching-ching also comes and fights Chan-chan, revealing the latter to be a traitor. Ching-ching tells Cougar that this was all a setup by Wolf, which originated ten years ago when Wolf killed their mentor and faked his own death in order to obtain the "Cougar Head Blade". Chan-chan also comes back to confess and apologize for her betrayal and reveals that the silver box contains a photographic paper, which turns out to be a photo showing Wolf killing his mentor. Cougar therefore decides to battle to the death with Wolf.

== Cast ==
- Alan Tang as Black Cougar
- Brigitte Lin as Ching-ching
- Simon Yam as Black Jack Love
- Tony Leung Ka-fai as Mang-po Fai
- Dicky Cheung as Robert Parkinson
- Carrie Ng as Madam Rose
- Jennifer Chan as Chan-chan
- Elsie Chan as Enna
- Yuen Wah as Bloody Wolf
- Melvin Wong as Chu
- Pau Fong as Mentor (cameo)
- Sze Ka-keung as Fat Wong (cameo)
- Lily Lee as Airplane wet nurse (cameo)
- Kingdom Yuen (cameo)
- Kwan Yung as Thug in final fight scene
- Kong Miu-deng

== Reception ==
=== Critical ===
Andrew Sarooch of Far East Films gave the film a score of 2 out of 5 stars and criticizes its tasteless comedy and strange characters, but complements it imaginative action sequences.

=== Box office ===
The film grossed HK$7,257,468 at the Hong Kong box office during its theatrical run from 18 November to 1 December 1993.
