= Alan Tang =

- Born: 20 September 1946; Guangzhou, Guangdong, Republic of China
- Died: 29 March 2011 (aged 64); Ho Man Tin, Hong Kong
- Occupations: Actor; film producer; film director
- Years active: 1964–1994
- Spouse: Janet Yim Chan-nap (m. 1975)
- Children: 2

Chinese name
- Traditional Chinese: 鄧光榮
- Simplified Chinese: 邓光荣
Transcriptions
Standard Mandarin
- Hanyu Pinyin: Dèng Guāngróng
Yue: Cantonese
- Jyutping: Dang6 Gwong1 Wing4
- Musical career
- Also known as: Student Prince (學生王子)

Alan Tang Kwong-Wing (20 September 1946 – 29 March 2011) was a Hong Kong film actor, producer and director. Tang was part of the "Silver Rat Squad" (銀色鼠隊), a 1970s pop band formed in Hong Kong.

== Early life ==
Tang was born in Guangzhou, Guangdong, China. He was the youngest of four children, having two older brothers and one older sister.

His secondary education was at the New Method College. After graduation, he received a full scholarship to the University of Hong Kong Law School. He deferred his acceptance to pursue an acting career.

== Career ==
His first starring role was at age 16 in the 1964 film The Student Prince (學生王子), produced by Lan Kwong Film Company, a role he landed after some school friends showed his picture to the filmmakers at his secondary school.

Upon graduation from secondary school, Tang acted in Hong Kong youth films starring Josephine Siao, Chen Chen, and Connie Chan Po-chu throughout the 1960s. Tang was often voted "Best Male Actor" by film magazines.

Tang found fame when he moved to Taiwan during the 1970s, where he had made over 60 feature films. The films he made were often dramas and romances, where he would often pair off with Brigitte Lin in such films as Run Lover Run.

It was reported that Tang made a salary of HK$150,000 per picture because of his popularity. In one 1974 article, Tang said that he was working on six movies at the same time; however, he only worked on one film a day and that made it difficult for producers. In 1974, Tang not only starred in The Splendid Love in Winter with Chen Chen, but he also produced it. Also that same year, the film Dynamite Brothers was released, co-starring with American Football hero Timothy Brown and James Hong. Tang continued his popular film career in both Hong Kong and Taiwan in the late 1970s. In 1977, Tang starred in director John Lo Mar's romance movie Impetuous Fire with up-and-coming teenage star Candice Yu. The movie was primarily shot in Macau, which opened up Tang's business ventures there.

Later in 1977, he formed the production company, The Wing-Scope Company.

With Tang working in Taiwan and his girlfriend at the time (Janet Yim) in Hong Kong, the pair had occasional difficulties, especially since the press reported their every move. Tang and Janet, however, remained together, in spite of living under constant scrutiny.

In 1987, Tang established another production company, In-Gear Film Production Co., Ltd., working alongside his brother, producer/presenter Rover Tang, and continued to produce and act in films, establishing himself as an action star. He appeared in a number of films—generally of the triad genre—such as Flaming Brothers, Gangland Odyssey, Return Engagement, Gun n' Rose and The Black Panther Warriors. He has also produced two films directed by Wong Kar-wai--As Tears Go By and Days of Being Wild.

=== Working with Wong Kar-wai ===
In the mid-1980s, Wong Kar-wai became a scriptwriter/director at Wing-Scope and In-Gear. He had written the scripts for the films, Return Engagement and Flaming Brothers, which both starred Tang.

Wong's current nostalgic artsy style took shape during his apprenticeship with Tang, who invested in the first movie Wong directed, As Tears Go By. Wong's career took off when he directed the film Days of Being Wild in 1990, despite Tang losing millions of invested dollars.

=== Later career ===
Following his retirement, Media Asia Group had gained rights to release his In-Gear film titles on DVD. Throughout the 1990s, Tang pursued a second career in the restaurant business.

== Personal life ==
Tang was an active philanthropist in Hong Kong and mainland China as both an individual and an involved Rotarian. According to the posthumous memoirs of democracy activist Szeto Wah, Tang lent significant financial and material support to help activists flee from China after the Tiananmen Square protests of 1989. Szeto said Tang helped out Operation Yellowbird by exerting his great influence in Macau and "got involved personally to save time but he remained low-key and never claimed his share of glory."

On 29 March 2011, Tang died in his home in Ho Man Tin at around 9 pm from a heart attack.

=== Sexual assault allegation ===
In December 2013, Next Magazine obtained the video of an interview with the late actress Yammie Lam in which she said that she had been raped by two "big brothers" in the Hong Kong entertainment industry more than two decades before. Lam stated that the first man, who had raped her after consuming alcohol, had died recently, no names were mentioned in the original video released in 2013. In January 2018, Chinese tabloid journalist Zhuo Wei uploaded a self-proclaimed uncensored video of Lam's interview. However, several Hong Kong media outlets cast doubts on the video as it appeared to be altered, including added noise cancellation and re-dubbed with a woman's voice, while Lam spoke to a male interviewer. In the re-dubbed video, Eric Tsang and Alan Tang's names were spoken by the questioner, not Lam herself. Tsang has denied the allegation and taken legal actions. According to video expert analysis, the original interview was recorded in 2006, and the video released in 2018 was proven fabricated. Tsang said the alleged incident was already the subject of a 2006 defamation suit that he won. “We already cleared our name. But after all these years, people still bring this up, I want to put the cyber-bullying to an end,” he said.

== Filmography ==
=== Actor ===
Year	Title (Chinese/English)	Role	Notes
1964	學生王子 / The Student Prince	Tang Wan-Tung	
1967	兔女郎 / Bunny Girl	Long Man	
1967	金色聖誕夜 /A Glamorous Christmas Night		
1968	春曉人歸時 / A Time for Reunion	Fong Chung-Yeung	
1968	鐵二胡 / Iron Fiddle		
1968	鎖著的新娘 / Bride in Chains	Paul Fu	
1969	紅燈綠燈 / Red Light, Green Light		
1969	黃衫客 / The One in Yellow		
1969	飛男飛女 / Social Characters	Peter Ko	
1969	合歡歌舞慶華年 / Let's Sing and Dance to Celebrate a Peaceful Year		
1969	成家立室 / Let's Build a Family		
1970	快樂時光 / Happy Times	Cheng	
1970	學府新潮 / Modern School Life	David Tong	
1970	瘋狂酒吧 / The Mad Bar		
1970	小姐不在家 / Miss Not Home		
1971	我為你痴迷 / I Am Crazy About You		
1971	我的情人 / Oh My Love		
1971	無敵鐵沙掌 / The Invincible Iron Palm	Yen Tsang	
1971	日月神童 / The Mighty Couple	Yue Di	
1971	浪子與修女 / Maria		
1971	淘氣女歌手 / Song of Happy Life		
1971	鈔票與我 / Money and I		
1971	Tiada jalan lain / No Other Way	Roy Supit	Co-production between Taiwan and Indonesia
1972	偷情世界 / The Stealing Love		
1972	鬼馬女歌手 / Songs and Romance Forever		
1972	火戀 / Impetuous Fire	Tommy	
1972	色字頭上一把刀 / The Peeper, the Model and the Hypnotist		
1972	騙術大觀 / Cheating in Panorama		
1972	辣手強徒 / The Notorious Ones		
1972	白屋之戀 / Love in a Cabin	Chung Yin-Shin	
1972	情變 / Changing Love		
1972	血愛 / Love and Blood		
1972	野馬 / Wild Horse		
1972	拳門 / The Bloody Fight	Shih Chen-Wa	
1972	火燙的愛人 / Huo Tang De Ai Ren		
1973	血洒後街 / Back Street		
1973	蕩寇三狼 / Death Comes in Three	George	
1973	彩雲飛 / The Young Ones	Min Yun Lau	
1973	明日天涯 / If Tomorrow Comes	Paul	
1973	小偷鬥大賊 / The Rats		
1973	愛從那裡來 / Where Does Love Come From?		
1973	香港夜譚 / Hong Kong Nite Life		
1973	一蔣士 / One Reed Soil		
1973	怒雙衝冠 / Unsubdued Furies	Siao Wah	
1973	鐵牛 / Iron Bull		
1973	愛慾奇譚 / Love Is a Four Letter Word		
1973	香港式的偷情 / Adultery Chinese Style		
1973	應召女郎 / The Call Girls	Phillip	
1973	亡命浪子 / Death on the Docks	Hsu Chien Ying	
1974	別了親人 / Farewell Dearest		
1974	一年幽夢 / One Year's Fantasy	Ho Dong-Ni	
1974	天堂 / The Paradise		
1974	運財童子小祖宗 / Lucky, Lucky		
1974	海鷗飛處 / Where the Seagull Flies		
1974	近水樓台 / First Come, First Love	Chan Ka Kai	
1974	早婚 / Too Young		
1974	銀色大隊 / The Silver Band		
1974	功夫兄弟 / The Dynamite Brothers	Larry Chin	
1974	花花公子 / The Playboy		
1974	龍鳳配 / The Colorful Ripples		
1974	冬戀 / The Splendid Love in Winter	Chan Chi	
1974	大鄉里 / The Country Bumpkin		
1975	吾土吾民 / Land of the Undaunted	Chu Yu-Bin	
1975	翩翩情 / Love Story of Pian Pian		
1975	彩宏焦焦 / The Floating Clouds		
1975	玫瑰戀 / Blood and Rose		
1975	未曾留下地止 / 24 Hours Romance		
1975	愛情辰跑 / Run Lover Run	Yang I-Fan	
1975	狼吻 / Kissed by the Wolves		
1976	楓葉情 / Forever My Love	Gao Yuan	
1976	愛的迷藏 / Love Is Like a Game		
1976	愛情奪標 / Game of Love		
1976	金色的影子 / Yesterday, Today and Tomorrow		
1976	狼來的時候 / Long Loi Dik Shut Hau	Lu Yi Min	
1976	海天一色 / The Beauty with Two Faces		
1976	戀愛功夫 / Love by Post	Yan Yi Fan	
1976	大富人家 / Born Rich		
1976	愛在夏威弟 / Love in Hawaii	Joe	
1976	約會在早晨 / The Morning Date		
1976	愛的奇譚 / Love of Strange Talk		
1976	小祖宗 / The Little Ancestors		
1977	波斯夕陽情 / Mitra		
1977	今生今世 / Impetuous Fire	Tai Lun	
1977	牛郎艷遇		
1977	出冊 / The Discharged	Lee Kai Fa	
1977	幽蘭在雨中 / Orchid in the Rain	Cheng Yang	
1977	流氓皇帝 / The Scoundrel		
1978	情九點零三分 / Three Minutes Past Nine	Hua Xin-Cheng	
1978	白粉雙雄 / The Rascal Billionaire		
1978	追 / The Chase	Cheng Yuan	
1978	大冧巴 / The Big Number		
1978	林亞珍 / Lam Ah Chun		Cameo
1978	金鎖匙 / The Golden Key / Chìa khóa vàng	Fang Dai-Kuen	
1979	發窮惡 / The Wickedness in Poverty		
1979	家法 / Law Don	Hun Ying	
1980	隻手遮天 / Absolute Monarch		
1981	知法犯法 / The Legal Illegals		
1981	無毒不丈夫 / Don't Kill Me, Brother!	Fan Kwok-Ho	
1982	血洗唐人街 / New York Chinatown	Lui	
1982	狂夜大風暴 / Kong Ye Dai Fung Bou		
1983	怒拔太陽旗 / The Militarism Revival	Tong	
1983	盟 / I Do!	Ngon Kok	
1984	有 Friend 冇驚 / Winner Takes All?	Joe	
1984	黃禍 / Yellow Peril	Dennis Kwan Chi Wah	
1984	朝來寒雨晚來風 / The Holocaust		Originally released in 1975
1987	香港小姐寫真 / Miss Hong Kong	George	Also known as Private Life
1987	江湖龍虎斗 / Flaming Brothers	Wing / Chan Wai Lun	
1989	開心巨無霸 / Mr. Sunshine	Bomb specialist	Cameo
1990	再戰江湖 / Return Engagement	Lung Ho Tin	
1990	義膽雄心 / Gangland Odyssey	Mr. Tang	
1992	五湖四海 / Requital	Master Cheung	
1992	龍騰四海 / Gun n' Rose	Alan Lung	
1993	黑豹天下 / The Black Panther Warriors	Black Cougar	

=== Director ===
- 1977: 出冊 / The Discharged
- 1979: 家法 / Law Don

=== Producer ===
- 1973: 亡命浪子 / Death on the Docks
- 1974: 冬戀 / The Splendid Love in Winter
- 1983: 怒拔太陽旗 / The Militarism Revival
- 1984: 有Friend冇驚 / Winner Takes All?
- 1985: 開心三響炮 / Funny Triple
- 1985: 求愛反斗星 / Crazy Romance
- 1987: 江湖龍虎斗 / Flaming Brothers
- 1987: 猛鬼差館 / The Haunted Cop Shop
- 1987: 香港小姐寫真 / Miss Hong Kong
- 1988: 我要富貴 / My Dear Son
- 1988: 旺角卡門 / As Tears Go By
- 1989: 捉鬼大師 / Vampire Buster
- 1990: 再戰江湖 / Return Engagement
- 1991: 阿飛正傳 / Days of Being Wild
- 1992: 龍騰四海 / Gun n' Rose
- 1993: 黑豹天下 / The Black Panther Warriors
- 1994: 功夫學者 / The Kung Fu Scholar
