= Yip Kai-foon =

Chinese criminal known for armed robberies in Hong Kong from the 1980s to 1990s

- 葉繼歡
- Born: 12 June 1961; Haifeng, Guangdong, China
- Died: 19 April 2017 (aged 55); Queen Mary Hospital, Hong Kong, China
- Other names: Teeth Dog; Goosehead
- Occupation: Gangster
- Status: Deceased
- Convictions: Handling stolen goods (1985); Possession of firearms and ammunition without licences (1985, 1996); Escaping from legal custody (1996); Using a gun to resist arrest (1985, 1996); Possession of explosives with intent to endanger life or damage property (1984); Assault occasioning actual bodily harm (2010)
- Penalty: 36 years imprisonment (reduced from 41 years on appeal: 11 years from prior sentence, 30 years from new charges)
- Capture status: Captured
- Wanted since: 24 August 1989
- Escaped: 24 August 1989
- Escape end: 13 May 1996

Details
- Weapon: Type 56 assault rifle
- Imprisoned at: Stanley Prison (1996)

Yip Kai-foon
- Traditional Chinese: 葉繼歡
- Simplified Chinese: 叶继欢
Transcriptions
Standard Mandarin
- Hanyu Pinyin: Yè Jìhuān
Yue: Cantonese
- Jyutping: jip6 gai3fun1

Yip Kai-foon (Chinese: 葉繼歡; 12 June 1961 – 19 April 2017), also known as "Teeth Dog" and "Goosehead", was an infamous Chinese criminal who was most active in Hong Kong from the early 1980s to 1990s. He and his gang specialised in robbing jewellery stores with assault rifles. Their weapon of choice was the AK-47 assault rifle, which they acquired from black markets hosted by triads. He is also the first person to have used an AK-47 during an armed robbery in Hong Kong.

== Early crimes ==
In October 1984, when he was 23, Yip led a gang of five armed mainland Chinese men into Hong Kong. They robbed two jewellery stores, King Fook Jewellery Co. Ltd on 10 October 1984 and Dickson Jewellery Co. Ltd. on 27 October 1984, managing to obtain more than HK$2 million worth of precious items. Shots were fired during the course of both robberies.

On 28 December 1984, the police carried out a sting operation involving an undercover policeman posed as a potential buyer for the stolen goods. Once the policeman identified himself, Yip attempted to shoot him and a violent struggle occurred. Yip was subdued and found with two handguns, later linked by ballistics to the October robberies.

Yip was convicted on four counts (two counts of handling stolen goods for each robbery, one count of possession of firearms, and one count of use of a firearm with intent to resist arrest) and sentenced to 18 years in prison. Yip contested the conviction, claiming that he was asked only to find a buyer for what he thought were sub-standard watches produced in local factories; his appeal was dismissed in 1987. Yip later escaped on 24 August 1989, when he faked appendicitis and was transferred to Queen Mary Hospital. In the toilet, he jumped his two officers with broken bottles and made off in a van parked at the hospital entrance. He hijacked the van with two occupants inside, a 37-year-old van driver and driver's 6-year-old son. While driving, he forced the driver to take off their shoes and clothes so Yip could put them on. He got off at Wong Chuk Hang and left the scene by bus. He is presumed to have fled into mainland China.

== On the run ==
=== AK-47 heists ===
On 9 June 1991, he and his gang, armed with AK-47s and pistols, robbed five goldsmiths shops on the "Golden" Mut Wah Street in Kwun Tong. They fired 54 shots at police and escaped with gold and jewellery worth HK$5.7 million. Many onlookers thought that the gun battle was being staged for a film.

The gang was linked to a robbery of two jewellers on Tai Po Road in Sham Shui Po on 10 March 1992. During the course of that robbery, gang members fired 65 shots at police and members of the public, escaping with HK$3 million worth of jewellery.

Yip is thought to have been involved in a 6 January 1993 jewellery store robbery on Nathan Road in Mong Kok, when a gang fired 30 rounds from AK-47s, killing a woman passerby. One robber was shot by police during the chase; the others dumped his body on the street when they switched getaway cars.

Macau police suspected Yip was involved in an April 1994 armed heist of HK$40 million in gambling chips from the casino at the Hyatt Regency Hotel on Taipa.

In 1995, Yip moved his crime operation to Shenzhen, participating in the January abduction and murder of a Tianjin businessman and the November murder of a police informant.

The total worth of his stolen goods is estimated at HK$20 million (approximately US$2,576,920). Yip achieved notoriety by escaping police custody multiple times.

=== Capture and trial ===
His spree finally came to an end on 13 May 1996 when he was arrested following a Kennedy Town gunfight with police that left him paralyzed from the waist down. At the time he had a HK$1 million reward on his head, though the two officers involved did not receive the reward. Two police officers had surprised Yip and his gang in an alley near the waterfront. Since they had just debarked from a boat, the police suspected they were illegal immigrants and asked for identification. The rest of the gang fled, but Yip pulled a gun from a bag and began shooting. During an ensuing foot pursuit, the officers testified they ordered him to drop his gun, which he refused to do, instead shooting at the officers. After his gun jammed, he was captured. He was found with a machine gun, a pistol, and 1.8 kg of explosives.

He was charged with possession of firearms and ammunition without a licence, and shooting with intent to do grievous bodily harm, stemming from wounds one of the officers received in the course of the arrest. While Yip was recovering from his injuries, additional charges of escaping custody and kidnapping (during the van hijacking) were added stemming from his 1989 escape.

During the lead-up to the trial, a fictionalised version of Yip's life was filmed as King of Robbery (Chinese: 悍匪), also known as Life Will Never Be Twice and starring Simon Yam and Roy Cheung, but its planned August 1996 release was delayed by court order.

Yip's trial began on 18 February 1997, with the defence claiming that the police shot Yip in the back and then stole HK$30,000 from him. He dismissed his defence team two days later, subsequently appearing to fall asleep when given the chance to cross-examine a prosecution witness.

On 10 March 1997, he was convicted of all charges and sentenced to 41 years in prison, which consists of the 11 years he had left on his original sentence and 30 years on the new charges, to be served consecutively. The earliest year in which he could have been released was 2022.

== Imprisonment and death ==
Yip's lawyers appealed his conviction, stating that the publicity surrounding his arrest was prejudicial to the jury, but lost the appeal on 8 December 1998. A separate appeal to reduce his sentence, based on his injuries and subsequent care, was heard in March 1999. The Court of Appeal reduced his sentence by approximately five years. Yip then went to the Court of Final Appeal seeking a further reduction in his sentence based on his "catastrophic" medical condition, but the appeal was denied. Yip continued to maintain his innocence over the 1996 shootout, offering a substantial reward for a witness who he alleges saw the events leading up to his arrest.

In August 2003, Yip married his mainland Chinese wife, who he had previously been married to under a false name before his imprisonment. In March 2004, Yip converted to Christianity.

On 11 January 2010, Yip was sentenced to an additional six months in jail for assaulting an officer at Stanley Prison on 30 April 2009. He had complained that he had been badly treated by prison guards.

On 1 April 2017, he was hospitalised at Queen Mary Hospital for cancer treatment. He died on 19 April 2017 of lung cancer.

== Cultural influence ==
Several documentaries detail Yip's exploits and several fictional movies are adapted from his criminal history.

- The Most Dangerous Man (2010, 最．危險人物; Zuì wéixiǎn rénwù). Yim Foon portrayed by Karel Wong
- King of Robbery (1996, 悍匪; Hàn Fěi; 'Ruthless'). Chan Sing portrayed by Simon Yam
- Hong Kong's King of Thieves (香港盜賊之王). Yip Kai-foon portrayed by Chan Wah
- Trivisa (2016). Yip Kwok-foon portrayed by Richie Jen
