= Vicky Wong =

Hong Kong film director

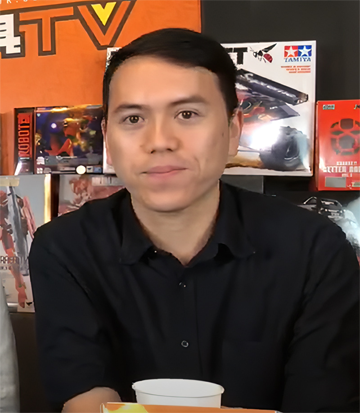
- Wong in 2018
- Born: 29 October 1979 (age 47); Hong Kong
- Occupation: Film director

Vicky Wong Wai-kit (Chinese: 黃偉傑, born 29 October 1979) is a Hong Kong film director. He co-directed the 2016 film Trivisa produced by Hong Kong film director Johnnie To and screenwriter Yau Nai Hoi. Trivisa has won numerous awards including Best Screenplay, Best Editing, Best Actor, Best Director and Best Picture at the 36th Hong Kong Film Awards, Best film at the Hong Kong Film Critics Society Award. Vicky was also nominated for Best New Director at the 53rd Golden Horse Film Festival and Awards.

Trivisa was premiered at 66th Berlin International Film Festival and opened 40th Hong Kong International Film Festival. In 2017, he shared the Hong Kong Film Award for Best Director with Frank Hui and Jevons Au for their film Trivisa. He participated at Berlin Talent Camp in 2011.

Wong studied in the Department of Journalism and Mass Communication at Hong Kong Shue Yan University. He worked professionally as a filmmaker in broadcast and independent production for several years before deciding to further his career by studying filmmaking in UK. He studied at London Film Academy in London. After he finished his filmmaking course, he started making scripted short films including Wish, Valediction, Variable and the Decisive Moment^{[7]}. Variable won the Excellence Award at 30th JVC Tokyo Video Festival and received Special Mention at the 13th Hong Kong Independent Short Film and Video Awards. His most successful short film is Decisive Moment which won Best Cinematography award at Fresh Wave 2010, which led him to be picked by Johnnie To as one of the three directors of Trivisa.
