= Naked Killer =

1992 Hong Kong film by Clarence Fok

- Theatrical release poster
- Directed by: Clarence Fok Yiu-leung
- Written by: Wong Jing
- Produced by: Wong Jing; Dennis Chan
- Starring: Chingmy Yau; Simon Yam; Carrie Ng; Madoka Sugawara; Wai Yiu; Ken Lo
- Cinematography: Peter Pau; William Yim
- Music by: Lowell Lo
- Distributed by: Media Asia Entertainment Group
- Release date: 3 December 1992 (Hong Kong)
- Running time: 92 minutes
- Country: Hong Kong
- Language: Cantonese Chinese

Naked Killer (Chinese: 赤裸羔羊) is a 1992 Hong Kong erotic thriller film written and produced by Wong Jing, and directed by Clarence Fok Yiu-leung. The film stars Chingmy Yau, Simon Yam and Carrie Ng.

The film is regarded as a cult classic.

== Plot ==
Kitty is a vicious young woman who has no qualms about stabbing girlfriend-bullying men in the genitals. Tinam is a cop who is undergoing a traumatic period: he shot his own brother by accident, and as a result now vomits every time he handles his gun.

When Kitty severely injures a man by stabbing him in the groin, Tinam attempts to arrest her but fails. Kitty later turns up at the police station and manipulates the facts to the point that Tinam has no choice but to start a relationship with her. Tinam, who has become impotent, finds that he no longer feels the same way about Kitty, who is content with leading him on.

Kitty's father is married to a new wife but the marriage is tense. One evening he catches her cheating on him with another man called Bee. In the fight that follows, Kitty's father falls down the stairs and is killed.

Furiously determined to seek revenge, Kitty breaks into Bee's office and proceeds to kill him, his bodyguards and most of his staff. In the course of her escape she takes a woman hostage but, unexpectedly, the woman helps her out, disposing of many of the pursuers herself.

The woman turns out to be a professional assassin called Sister Cindy. She was out to kill Bee herself before Kitty intercepted. She proceeds to train Kitty and gives her a new identity. The training includes the killing of enraged, chained-up paedophiles in Sister Cindy's cellar.

For her first mission, Kitty accompanies Sister Cindy and murders a member of the Japanese yakuza. This leads to a contract being placed on them and the assignment is entrusted to Princess, one of Sister Cindy's former protégés and a lesbian with an equally deadly young lover called Baby.

While investigating the murder himself, Tinam goes to check up on an air hostess whom the victim met prior to his death. The witness is Vivian Shang, whom Tinam recognises as Kitty. She denies this but renews their relationship.

Sister Cindy proceeds to murder other people who could connect Kitty to Vivian Shang, including Tinam's superior and a witness to the groin-stabbing incident. Kitty does however stop her from killing Tinam himself. Kitty and Tinam consummate their relationship. Sister Cindy tells Kitty to leave and make the most of her relationship.

Princess, who is supposed to kill Kitty, becomes obsessed with her, leading to a conflict with Baby. They set about killing Sister Cindy who, with death approaching, puts up a good fight. But she is ultimately defeated due to a ploy used by Princess earlier that day. Princess had kissed Sister Cindy with poisonous lipstick, which, combined with some wine she has drunk, kills her.

Kitty goes into hiding but later confronts Princess, seemingly willing to become her partner both in business and in bed. Princess subsequently falls into the same trap she set for Sister Cindy: when they kiss, Kitty passes on some poisoned lipstick of her own. Tinam then bursts in, shooting away at Princess' henchmen.

In the battle, Tinam kills Baby, and a furious Princess pursues him and Kitty back to Sister Cindy's home. The poison in Princess' system catches up with her however and she dies with Kitty taunting her by saying that she on the other hand will get to hospital in time to survive.

By this time, the poison inside Kitty has taken effect. Unwilling to lose her again, Tinam fires his gun into the gas oven causing the house to go up in flames with the two of them inside.

== Cast ==
- Chingmy Yau as Kitty/Vivian Shang
- Simon Yam as Tinam
- Carrie Ng as Princess
- Madoka Sugawara as Baby
- Wai Yiu as Sister Cindy (as Kelly Yao)
- Hui Siu-Hung
- Ken Lo as Bee
- Esther Wan Yue-Hung

== Reception ==
Sight & Sound stated that the film had "appalling dubbing" and a "muddled Nikita-like plot", but was "redeemed by virtuoso action sequences." The review concluded that "no amount of window dressing can conceal the holes in the script."
