= Zhuo Wei =

Chinese entertainment journalist

Han Bingjiang (Chinese: 韩炳江: born September 23, 1971, Tianjin), better known by his pen name Zhuo Wei (Chinese: 卓伟), is a Chinese entertainment journalist. He is often referred to as "China's No.1 Paparazzo."

== Biography ==
=== Early life ===
Zhuo was born into a working-class family in Tianjin and aspired to become a journalist from an early age. He initially studied metallurgy at a technical secondary school and, after graduation, worked as a secretary at the Tianjin Steel Plant (now Tianjin Iron & Steel Group Co., Ltd.). Because of his interest in film, in 1995, he took a job at a movie theatre, only to find out it was more of an attendant rather than a publicist, but he still worked there for five years. He subsequently obtained a bachelor’s degree in Chinese language and literature through China’s higher self-study examination system.

=== Daily News period (2000–2002) ===
In January 2000, Zhuo joined the newly established entertainment news department of Daily News in Tianjin, beginning his career as a film reporter. Within six months, his report on a proposed land redevelopment project involving Changchun Film Studio drew legal threats against the newspaper, although the studio had in fact engaged in extensive land sales from the late 1990s through the early 2010s. The newspaper backed Zhuo and allowed him to continue reporting under a different pen name.

In 2001, Zhuo covered the 25th Hong Kong International Film Festival, becoming part of Daily News’ first cross-border reporting team. During an 18-day stay in Hong Kong, he interviewed more than 30 celebrities and produced dozens of reports that were widely circulated in mainland China. Exposure to Hong Kong’s tabloid-style entertainment journalism during the trip significantly shaped his career path.

In June 2002, after reading an Asahi Shimbun interview with director Jiang Wen about Devils on the Doorstep's screening in Japan, in which Jiang mentioned visiting Yasukuni Shrine, Zhuo confirmed the information and published a report under the pen name “Shi Yu”, drawing wide controversy. Jiang responded that the visit had been for research on militarism and artistic preparation, and criticized the report as going beyond entertainment journalism and approaching a political witch-hunt. Numerous public figures—including Cui Yongyuan, Bai Yansong, Tian Zhuangzhuang, Zheng Xiaolong, Han Sanping, Shi Tiesheng, and Ah Cheng—defended Jiang and criticized media sensationalism. Zhuo was subsequently dismissed by the newspaper.

=== Bigstar and The Beijing News period (2003–2006) ===
After leaving Daily News, Zhuo briefly worked in advertising before returning to journalism in May 2003, joining Bigstar, a Beijing-based entertainment weekly under Enlight Media. Influenced by Hong Kong tabloid journalism, he began focusing on celebrity gossip as a paparazzo.

At Bigstar, Zhuo formed a long-term partnership with photographer Feng Ke, with Zhuo typically responsible for reporting and Feng for images. The duo first gained attention within media circles after disguising themselves as migrant workers to infiltrate Liu Xiaoqing’s residential compound and capture her first public photo, alongside a new boyfriend, following her second imprisonment for tax evasion. At Bigstar, Zhuo and Feng also published a series of on-set paparazzi photos from high-profile film productions, including Kung Fu Hustle, House of Flying Daggers, and The Twins Effect II, for which they were sometimes caught and assaulted by crew members.

In September 2004, Bigstar published details about the residences of several celebrities, including Fan Bingbing, Huang Xiaoming, Zhou Xun, and Feng Xiaogang, which led one individual to camp outside Feng’s home. At a press conference for his film A World Without Thieves, Feng publicly berated a Bigstar reporter. Amid growing backlash and a coordinated boycott by celebrities, the tabloid underwent a leadership shake-up, during which Feng joined Sina, while Zhuo left for The Beijing News, where he first revealed the relationship between Chen Jianbin and Jiang Qinqin.

In 2006, Zhuo's reporting on rock singer Dou Wei's personal life—including his verbal attacks on ex-wife Gao Yuan and his financial difficulties—prompted Dou to storm The Beijing News office to dispute the coverage. Dou then vandalized property and set fire to a company car, which did not belong to Zhuo. Although the newspaper stood by the report, Zhuo resigned, feeling out of place as a paparazzo at a more serious newspaper. Riding on the early notoriety from Dou Wei’s protest in 2006, Zhuo made appearances on popular talk shows A Date with Luyu and Tell It Like It Is, discussing the experiences of being a paparazzo.

=== Southern Metropolis Magazine and Fengxing Studio period (2006-2017) ===
In the later half of 2006, Zhuo joined the Guangzhou-based Southern Metropolis Magazine, marking the start of his career’s heyday.

In November of the same year, he co-founded mainland China's first professional paparazzi team with Feng, initially named Anzhan Studio, later renamed Fengxing Studio. The studio mainly collaborated with Southern Metropolis Magazine, as well as video websites Sohu and iQIYI in the following years. In 2010, Zhuo and Feng co-founded a media company to formalize and commercialize the studio’s operations. Two years later, in 2012, the studio launched its first mobile app, Ai Yu Ai Le.

In the early years of Fengxing Studio, Zhuo's notable reports included revelations about alleged relationships between Zhao Wei and Wang Liqin; and between Xu Qing and disgraced China Construction Bank chairman Wang Xuebing. Both were published in 2006, but were denied by the individuals involved. In another high-profile report in 2007, Zhuo described Chen Kun's previously acknowledged "adopted son" as his "illegitimate son," fueling continued speculation about the identities of the child's biological parents.

In late 2012, amid the divorce battle between Dong Jie and Pan Yueming, Dong issued a statement accusing Pan of hiring paparazzi to follow her. Although she did not name anyone, the accusation was widely understood within the industry to refer to Zhuo and his team. Offended by the implication of unprofessional conduct, Zhuo intensified his surveillance. In March 2013, he photographed Dong vacationing in Hainan with actor Wang Dazhi. The exclusive, which showed the two sharing a passionate kiss, significantly damaged Dong’s career while elevating Zhuo’s profile.

Zhuo’s rise as a media personality in his own right was further solidified in 2013 with two high-profile exclusives: the confirmation of the relationship between Zhang Ziyi and Wang Feng, and what is regarded as Zhuo's most serious journalistic endeavor—a year-long investigation into director Zhang Yimou’s violation of China’s family planning policies. The latter, a major national media topic at the time—sparked by a leak campaign allegedly orchestrated by the director's long-time business partner Zhang Weiping after their acrimonious split—was substantiated by Zhuo’s paparazzi photos of the director's previously undisclosed wife and children, published in Southern Metropolis Magazine. A prolific 2013 earned Zhuo the “Journalist of the Year” award from the Nanfang Daily Newspaper Group. Reflecting on the impact of his reports, Zhuo wrote in the magazine’s year-end feature: “The reporting on Zhang Yimou’s overbirth case was an encouragement to both myself and the Fengxing Studio. It showed that paparazzi can do more than chase celebrity gossip—we can also play a positive role in reporting that concerns social justice and the public’s right to know.”

In March 2014, Zhuo and his team gained enormous attention after capturing photos of actor Wen Zhang's extramarital affair with actress Yao Di, ushering in a period of rapid expansion for his company. By the end of 2014, Zhuo and Feng each invested ¥300,000 to redevelop their app, renaming it from Ai Yu Ai Le to Quan Min Xing Tan. The updated app officially launched on January 24, 2015, adding features such as short videos, live streaming, and fan-submitted tips, with a stronger emphasis on social interaction. On January 28, Zhuo launched a Sina Weibo account to promote the app. That same year, Fengxing Studio secured ¥6 million in angel investment from Beijing's New Margin Capital.

During the heyday of Fengxing Studio in the early 2010s, Zhuo's other notable reports included the reunion of Faye Wong and Nicholas Tse; Sun Yang's secret son; Chen He's affair with Zhang Zixuan; and Bai Baihe's fling with a male model in Thailand, which led to her public confirmation of divorce from Chen Yufan two years earlier. In early October 2016, Jane Zhang's mother, Zhang Guiying, contacted Zhuo in an attempt to prevent Jane's marriage to Feng Ke (no relation to Zhuo's business partner), co-founder of music company Show City Times. On October 10, Quan Min Xing Tan released audio excerpts from an interview with Zhang Guiying, in which she accused Feng of keeping a mistress, who befriends and covertly monitors Jane. Jane took to Weibo to accuse Zhuo of manipulating her mother. Zhuo replied by sharing the Jay Chou song Listen to Mother's Words.

=== Ban and Comeback (2017-) ===
In early 2017, tensions between Zhuo and his partner Feng escalated due to differing visions for the studio's direction. Zhuo thrived on personal branding and public visibility, while Feng, much less known than Zhuo, sought to distance the studio from its paparazzi identity and transition toward mainstream entertainment media, in light of increasing media regulation in China. In April, Feng left the studio to establish his own GoHard Studio. On May 3, 2017, Fengxing Studio's photographers resigned en masse to join Feng. On June 7, the Beijing Internet Information Office summoned major platforms and shut down several "vulgar celebrity-following" accounts, including those managed by Zhuo and Feng.

Following a wave of layoffs, Zhuo launched a backup Weibo account under the handle "Yu Ji Xiao Yao." Through this account, he notably exposed Li Xiaolu's affair with rapper PG One and released an audio recording in which Yammie Lam, for the first time after years of rumors, personally alleged that she had been raped by Eric Tsang and Alan Tang. The account was suspended in February 2018, after which Zhuo largely withdrew from public view. Zhuo resurfaced in June 2018 via a WeChat Moments post, writing, "I'm doing fine—I can handle losing." On June 11, 2022, he attempted a comeback by launching an account on Douyin, but it was banned on the same day.

Into the 2020s, former members of the Fengxing Studio team resurfaced independently. Team members associated with Zhuo launched a series of gossip-focused social media accounts, primarily operating in cooperation with Baidu. Members aligned with photographer Feng became closely associated with the platform Kuaishou. In 2025, accounts linked to both were again subject to large-scale bans. The two teams subsequently resumed operations by launching new accounts.

== Popular culture ==
Zhuo is referenced in the television series Good Times (2015), in which the character played by Hu Ge, a frequent real-life target of Zhuo’s paparazzi coverage, refers to him as “the guy who photographs celebrities who forget to close their curtains.”

Zhuo is the inspiration for the character Li Ma in the television series Hi, I'm Saori (2018).
