= Simon Yam =

Hong Kong actor and producer (born 1955)

- 任達華
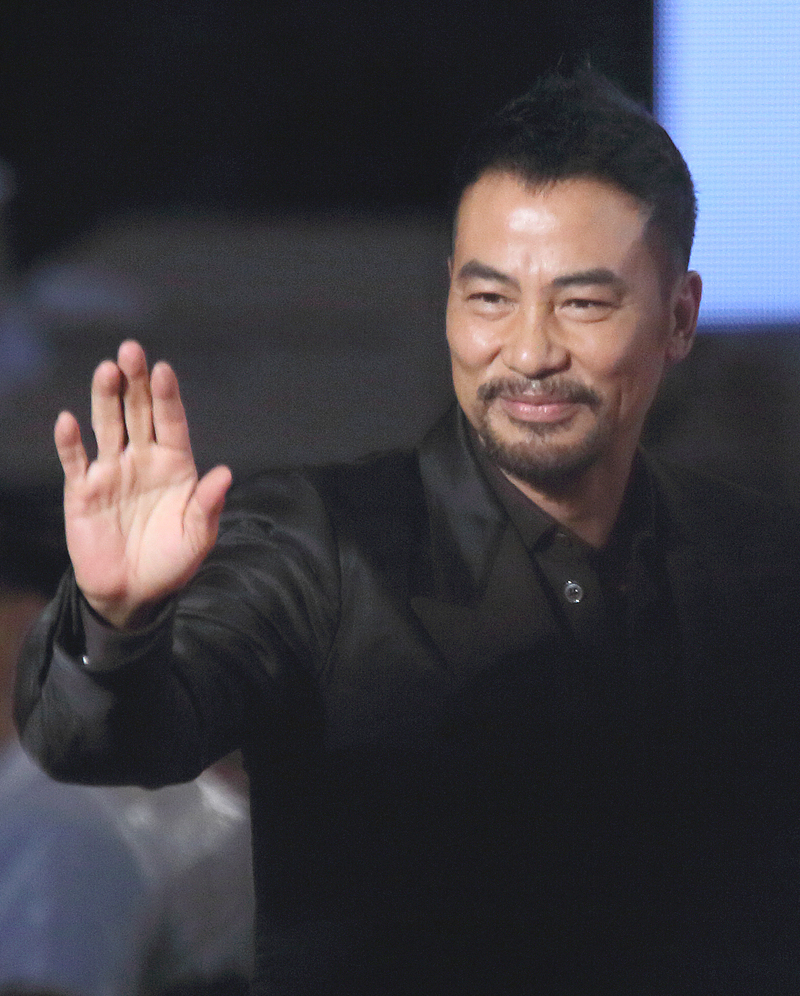
- Yam in 2015
- Born: Simon Yam Tat-wah; 19 March 1955 (age 71); British Hong Kong
- Occupations: Actor; producer; director
- Years active: 1977–present
- Spouses: Ho Sui-yi (m. 1981–1986) Sophia Kao (m. 1997)
- Children: Ella Yam (daughter)
- Awards: Hong Kong Film Awards – Best Actor; 2010 Echoes of the Rainbow Golden Bauhinia Awards – Best Actor; 2004 PTU; 2006 Election

Chinese name
- Traditional Chinese: 任達華
- Simplified Chinese: 任达华
Transcriptions
Standard Mandarin
- Hanyu Pinyin: Rén Dáhuá
Yue: Cantonese
- Jyutping: Jam6 Daat6-wa4

Simon Yam Tat-wah (Chinese: 任達華; born 19 March 1955) is a Hong Kong actor and film producer. He is best known for his collaborations with filmmaker Johnnie To in PTU (2003), Election (2005), Triangle (2007), and Sparrow (2008). His other notable films include SPL: Sha Po Lang (2005), Night & Fog (2009), and Echoes of the Rainbow (2010).

== Career ==
Yam started off as a model before becoming an actor in the mid 1970s. He then signed with the Hong Kong television network TVB, starring and co-starring in a number of television series prior to "apply his trades" in the film industry in 1987. His elder brother is Yam Tak-wing, a retired former Deputy Commissioner of Hong Kong Police.

In 1989, he starred in the Japanese-Hong Kong co-production of Bloodfight. This was the first of its kind in which English was spoken throughout the entire film. In 1992, Yam gained critical acclaim for his role as the maniacal Judge in the crime film Full Contact, where he faced off in a bloody battle against Chow Yun-fat's character. In 1993, he starred as "Dhalsim" in the action-comedy film Future Cops, a parody of Street Fighter directed by Wong Jing. In 1996, Yam began his role as Chiang Tin-Sung, the leader of the Hung Hing triads in the first three instalments of the Young and Dangerous film series.

In 2000, Yam starred as Cheung San, the progenitor of all vampires, in the television series My Date with a Vampire II, produced by ATV. In 2003, Yam made his Hollywood film debut in Lara Croft: Tomb Raider – The Cradle of Life as Shaolin crime lord.

In 2013, Yam directed his first film, as part of the Hong Kong portmanteau horror film Tales from the Dark 1.

In February 2021, Yam, Tony Leung and Andy Lau will team up in a new major action movie titled Goldfinger, backed by Emperor Motion Pictures and mainland Chinese partners, with a reported budget of around $30.8 million (RMB200 million).

== Personal life ==
Yam was married to his first wife Ho Sui-yi from 1981–86. In 1997, he married Sophia Kao, known as Qi Qi, an international model. She was born in Shanghai but raised in Austria. They have a daughter, Ella.

On 20 July 2019, Yam was stabbed at a promotional event in China. He suffered a minor injury and his manager said, "He was stabbed in the tummy area and also got a cut on his right hand." He underwent a minor operation in Zhongshan and recovered.

Yam's favorite investment is Hong Kong real estate.

== Filmography ==
=== Film ===
Year	Title	Role	Notes
1979	Law Don		
1980	House of the Lute		
1981	The Informer		
1981	Twins		
1982	He Lives by Night		
1982	Green Killer		
1986	Goodbye Mammie		
1986	New Heavenly Sword and Dragon Sabre		
1986	Tong – A Chinatown Story		
1987	The Big Brother		
1988	Tiger Cage	Michael Wong	
1988	Osmanthus Alley	Ah Hai	
1988	Burning Snow	Wah	
1988	Mistaken Identity		
1988	Women Prison	Wayne Lu	
1989	Live Hard	Senior Inspector Hui Tat-ming	
1989	Burning Ambition		
1989	Lucky Star		
1989	Chinese Cop Out		
1989	Framed		
1989	The Wild Ones		
1989	Mr. Coconut	Timothy Hui	
1989	Final Run		
1989	Four Loves		
1989	Miracles	Chief Inspector Ho's man	
1989	Big Man Little Affair		
1989	Bloodfight		
1990	Bullet in the Head	Luke	
1990	Killer's Romance	Jeffrey	
1990	Hong Kong Gigolo		
1990	The Cyprus Tigers		
1990	Fatal Termination		
1990	Return Engagement	Lee Pang	
1990	Doctor's Heart		
1991	The Plot		
1991	Bullet for Hire	Hon	
1991	Great Pretenders	Yam Sai-sung	
1991	Gigolo and Whore		
1991	Black Cat	Brian	
1991	Deadly Deal		
1991	Sea Wolves		
1991	Queen's High		
1991	The Good, the Bad, and the Bandit		
1991	Mission of Condor		
1991	The Banquet	Wai's friend	
1992	Gun n' Rose	Simon Lung	
1992	Gigolo and Whore II	Jack Cheung	
1992	Cash on Delivery		
1992	Once Upon A Time A Hero in China		
1992	Dr. Lamb	Lam Gor-yue	
1992	Friday Gigolo		
1992	The Night Rider		
1992	Naked Killer	Tinam	
1992	Powerful Four		
1993	Full Contact	Judge	
1993	Holy Weapon	Super Sword	
1993	Killer's Love		
1993	The Incorruptible		
1993	Killer's Love		
1993	A Day Without Policeman		
1993	Insanity		
1993	Can't Stop My Crazy Love For You		
1993	Love Among the Triad		
1993	First Shot	Sam Mok	
1993	The Black Panther Warriors	Black Jack Love	
1993	Future Cops	Sing (Dhalsim)	
1993	Prince of Portland Street		
1993	Final Judgment		
1993	Run and Kill	Ching Fung	
1993	Raped by an Angel	Tso Tat Wah	
1993	Rose Rose I Love You	Micky	
1994	The True Hero		
1994	Awakening		
1994	The Tragic Fantasy - Tiger of Wanchai	Chan Yiu-hing	
1994	Drunken Master III	Gay bus passenger	
1994	Crystal Fortune Run		
1994	Crossings		
1994	The Devil's Box		
1995	Passion 1995	Dick Wong	
1995	Twist		
1995	Police Confidential		
1995	Dragon Killer		
1995	Because of Lies		
1995	Love, Guns, and Glass		
1995	Story of a Robber	Kon Tin-lap	
1995	Farewell to My Dearest		
1995	Ghostly Bus		
1995	Man Wanted	Lok Man-wah	
1996	King of Robbery	Chan Sing	
1996	Bloody Friday		
1996	To Be No. 1		
1996	All of a Sudden	Tsui Chin-tun	
1996	Street Angels	Walkie Pi	
1996	Scared Memory		
1996	Young and Dangerous	Chiang Tin-sung	
1996	Young and Dangerous 2	Chiang Tin-sung	
1996	Young and Dangerous 3	Chiang Tin-sung	
1998	The Suspect	Dante Aquino	
1998	Operation Billionaire		
1998	Expect the Unexpected	Ken	
1998	Casino	Giant Wan	
1998	Hitman	Officer Chan Kwan	
1999	The Mission	Frank	
1999	The Legend of Speed		
1999	Night Club		
1999	Trust Me U Die		
2000	Juliet in Love		
2000	Model from Hell		
2000	Horoscope II: The Woman from Hell		
2000	To Where He Belongs		
2000	Deathnet.com		
2000	Cold War	Ka Hui	
2000	Man Wanted 3		
2001	Midnight Fly	Dr. Tong	
2001	Fulltime Killer	Albert Lee	
2001	Final Romance	Mr. Chuk	
2002	My Left Eye Sees Ghosts	Ben	
2002	Partners		
2003	Lara Croft: Tomb Raider – The Cradle of Life	Chen Lo	
2003	Looking for Mister Perfect		
2003	PTU	Sergeant Mike Ho	
2003	Eternal Flame of Fatal Attraction		
2004	Explosive City	Superintendent Charles Cheung	
2004	Breaking News	Asst. Commissioner Wong	Unbilled cameo
2004	Wake of Death	Sun Quan	
2005	Mob Sister	Tsan Gor (Chance)	
2005	Election	Lam Lok	
2005	The Unusual Youth	Police Superintendent	Unbilled cameo
2005	Outback		
2005	SPL (a.k.a. Kill Zone (US))	Inspector Chan Kwok-chung	
2005	Dragon Squad	Commander Hon Sun	
2006	Election 2 (a.k.a. Triad Election (US))	Lam Lok	
2006	Exiled	Boss Fay	Cameo
2007	Eye in the Sky	Sergeant Wong Man-chin (‛Dog Head’)	
2007	Triangle	Lee Bo-Sam	
2007	Exodus	Sergeant Tsim Kin-yip	
2008	Sasori		
2008	Ballistic		
2008	Fatal Move	Lin Ho-tung	
2008	Sparrow	Ken / The Sparrow	
2008	Ocean Flame	Detective Zhang	Also producer
2008	Tactical Unit – Human Nature	Sam	
2008	Tactical Unit – No Way Out		
2008	Tactical Unit – The Code	Lee Wing Sam	TV movie
2008	Ip Man	Chow Ching-chuen	
2009	Tactical Unit – Partners		
2009	Tactical Unit - Comrades in Arms	Sam	TV movie
2009	Night & Fog	Lee Sam	
2009	Vengeance	George Fung	
2009	The Storm Warriors	Lord Godless	
2009	Bodyguards and Assassins	Fang Tian	
2010	Black Ransom	Inspector Mann Cheung	
2010	Bad Blood	Funky	
2010	Echoes of the Rainbow	Mr. Law	
2010	Ip Man 2	Chow Ching-chuen	
2010	The Blood Bond	Lompoc	
2010	Midnight Beating	Gu Zhensheng	
2011	The Man Behind the Courtyard House		
2011	Coming Back	Li Zhenmu	
2012	Nightfall	George Lam	
2012	Design of Death	Yi Sheng	
2012	Passion Island	Simon	
2012	The Thieves	Chen	
2012	Cross	Lee Leung	
2012	Ripples of Desire		
2013	7 Assassins	Wu	
2013	Cold Eyes	Suspect	Cameo
2013	Man of Tai Chi	Superintendent Wong	
2013	Tales from the Dark 1	Kwan Fu-keung	Also director
2013	A Chilling Cosplay	Fang Youwei	
2013	Control	Tiger	
2013	The Constable	Lam Kwok-kuen	
2013	Les Jeux des nuages et de la pluie		French film
2014	As the Light Goes Out	Lee Pui-to	
2014	The Midnight After	Fat	
2014	Iceman	Cheung	
2015	12 Golden Ducks	King Sum	
2015	Sara	Kam Ho-yin	
2015	Two Thumbs Up	Chow Tai-po	
2015	Lovers & Movies	Qiu Guitang	
2015	SPL II: A Time for Consequences	Chan Kwok-wah	
2015	Wild City	Wong	
2015	Detective Gui		
2015	Ulterior Motive	Ye Cheng	
2015	Magic Card		
2016	Inside or Outside	Fei Xin	
2016	Phantom of the Theatre	Gu Ming Shan	
2016	The Tenants Downstairs	Chang Chia-chun	
2016	Mrs K	Scarface	
2017	Father and Son	OK Gen	
2017	Legend of the Naga Pearls	Xue Lie	
2017	Colour of the Game	Wah	
2017	S.M.A.R.T. Chase	Mach Ren	
2018	A Beautiful Moment		
2018	Air Strike	Air Defense Commander	Cameo
2018	Iceman II		
2018	Operation Red Sea	Albert	
2018	Justice in Northwest		
2018	A or B		
2018	House of the Rising Sons	Kin's father	
2019	Change of Gangster		
2019	The Human Comedy	Ba Ye	
2019	Chasing the Dragon II: Wild Wild Bunch	Lee Keung	
2019	Thaiflavor		
2019	Little Q	Li Baoting	
2019	My People, My Country	Wah	
2021	Raging Fire	Lok Chi-fai	
2021	Fireflies in the Sun	Zhang Zhengyi	
2022	Death Notice	Officer Tsang	
2022	Cyber Heist	Ben Suen Ban	
2022	A Light Never Goes Out	Biu	
2023	I Did It My Way	Chung Kam-mibg	
2023	The Goldfinger	K.K. Tsang	
2025	Little Red Sweet	Cheung Hing	
2025	Under Current	Yeung To	
2025	Escape from the Outland	Zhou Weijie	

=== Television series ===
Year	Title	Role	Notes
1977	A House Is Not a Home	Lok Wah	
1979	The Good, the Bad and the Ugly		
1980	The Shell Game		
1983	The Return of the Condor Heroes		
1984	The New Adventures of Chor Lau-heung		
1985	Reincarnated Princess		
1986	New Heavenly Sword and Dragon Sabre		
1987	The Legend of the Book and the Sword		
1989	War of the Dragon		
1994	Heaven's Retribution		
1996	ICAC Investigators 1996	To Wing-fat	Episode: "The Eagle in the web"
1999	My Date with a Vampire II	Cheung San	
2006	Tokyo Juliet	Chu Xing	
2018	The Great Adventurer Wesley		
2019	The Thunder	Undercover Officer Li Jianzhong (alias Zhao Jialiang)	
2019	One Dream One Home	Liang Dingwen	
2021	The Dance of the Storm	Mu Chuan	
2025	Homeland Guardian		

== Awards and nominations ==
Hong Kong Film Awards

- Best Supporting Actor Nomination for The Be No. 1
- Best Supporting Actor Nomination for Juliet in Love
- Best Supporting Actor Nomination for Midnight Fly
- Best Actor Nomination for PTU
- Best Actor Nomination for Election
- Best Supporting Actor Nomination for Election 2
- Best Actor Nomination for Eye in the Sky
- Best Actor Nomination for Sparrow
- Best Actor Nomination for Night and Fog
- Best Actor for Echoes of the Rainbow

(6 Best Actor Nominations, four Best Supporting Actor Nominations)

Golden Horse Awards

- Best Actor Nomination for PTU

Golden Bauhinia Awards

- Best Actor for PTU
- Best Actor for Election

Asia Pacific Screen Awards

- Best Performance by an Actor for Sparrow
