= Di Ying =

Taiwanese actress

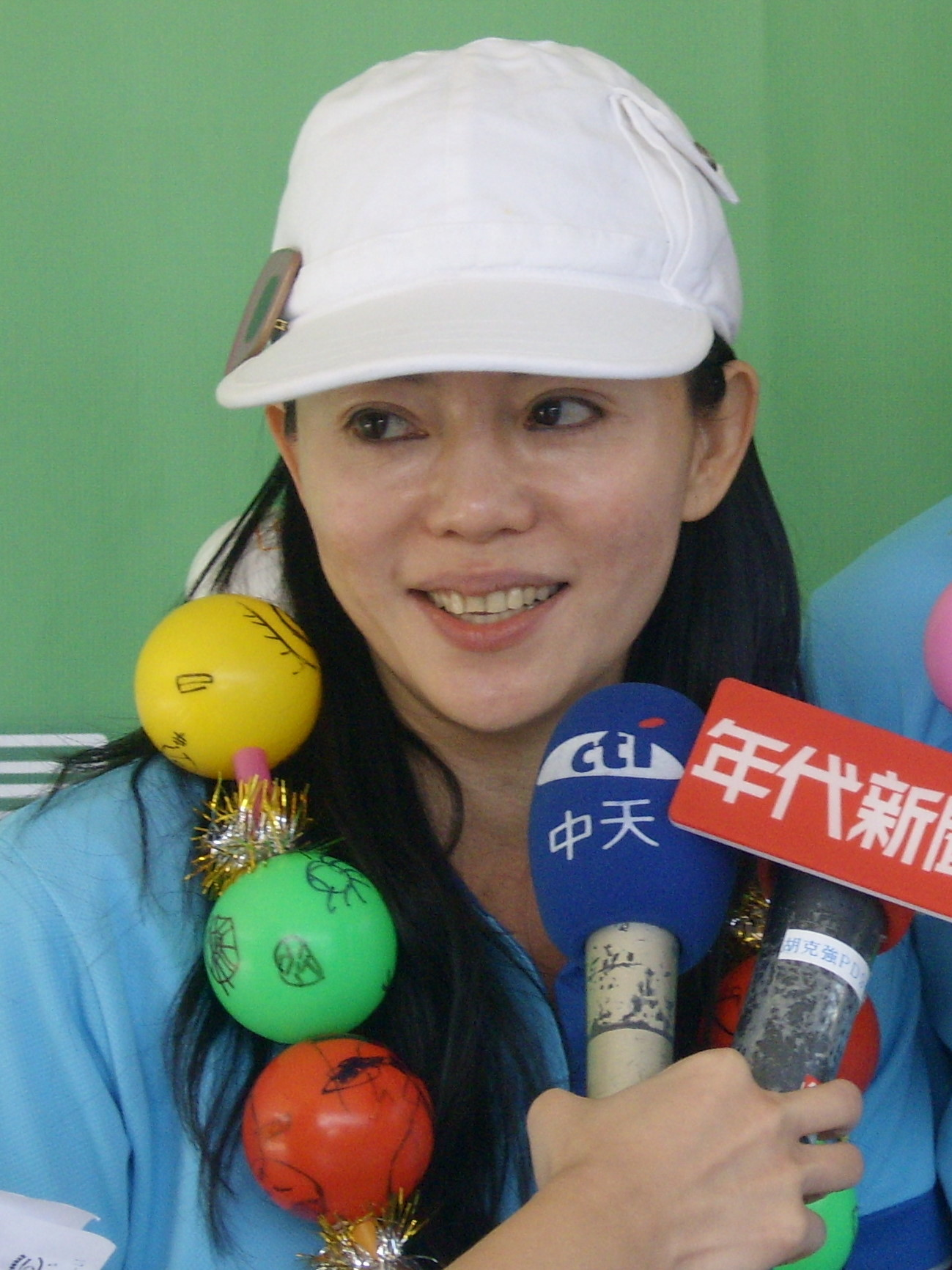
- at 2007 Alcon Taiwan Hiking.
- Born: Lin Miao-Hsi 林妙嬉; 21 April 1962 (age 64); Taiwan
- Education: Lee-Ming Institute of Technology Asia University, MBA
- Occupation: Actress
- Years active: 1982-present
- Spouses: Sun Peng (m. 1998–2004) Sun Peng (m. 2007)
- Children: An-Tso "Edward" Sun
- Family: Di Mei (sister)

Chinese name
- Traditional Chinese: 狄鶯
- Simplified Chinese: 狄莺
Transcriptions
Standard Mandarin
- Hanyu Pinyin: Dí Yīng

Di Ying (Chinese: 狄鶯; pinyin: Dí Yīng; born 21 April 1962) is a Taiwanese actress best known for her roles in Dou hua nu (1992) and Gatao 2: The New King (2018).

== Early life ==
Di was born as Lin Miao-Hsi (林妙嬉) in Taiwan on April 21, 1962. Di's mother was an actress and her father died early. Di's uncle Fang Jun is an actor.

== Career ==
Di kicked Hong Kong actress Yammie Lam in the stomach in public making her fall on the ground when they were co-starring in a Taiwanese TV series in 1991, and Di boasted about it in a variety show in 2005, calling her "Lam the big shot" (藍大牌), long after Lam's retirement.

== Personal life ==
Di was married to actor and tv show host Sun Peng in 1998 and the couple divorced in 2004. Di remarried her ex-husband in 2007. The couple has a son named An-Tso "Edward" Sun (孫安佐).

In 2018, Edward Sun threatened to shoot up the Pennsylvania high school where he was enrolled in as an exchange student. He was found to have 1,607 of rounds of ammunitions and handgun components that could be assembled into a 9mm handgun. He entered an open guilty plea to terrorist threats in the Delaware County Common Pleas Court, and pleaded guilty to illegally possessing ammunition in federal court.

== Filmography ==
=== Film ===
Year	English title	Chinese title	Role	Notes
1988	The Unforgettable Love Affair	舊情綿綿		
1990	Seventh Moon	七月鬼門開	Shu Na	
1992	Dou hua nu	豆花女	Jin Zhi	
2018	Gatao 2: Rise of the King	角頭2：王者再起	Madame Gui	

=== Television ===
Year	English title	Chinese title	Role	Notes
1986	—N/a	葫蘆奇兵		
1989	—N/a	望你早歸		
1990	Love	愛		
1992	—N/a	半生緣一世情	Zhao Meijuan	
1993	Justice Pao	包青天·雷震怒	Chai Weiting/ Lian Hua	
1993	Justice Pao	包青天·九道本	Wang Yanyan	
1993	Justice Pao	包青天·五鼠鬧東京	Meng Chunni	
1993	Legend of Liu Bowen	劉伯溫傳奇·雪女傳說	Yue Niang	
1994	The Inspector Wears Skirts	霸王花		
1994	Legend of Liu Bowen	劉伯溫傳奇·轉世英雄	Yuan Ziwei	
1995	Beggars and Hua Dan	乞丐與藝旦	Xiao Feng	
1995	The Daughter-in-law of the World	世間媳婦：勸世媳婦		
1995	Love of Taiwan	台灣情	Princess Malan	
1996	Love Me Again	再愛我一次	Liu Wangshi	
1997	Till Death Do Us Part	冥婚	Ye Shufen/ Ye Sufen	
1997	My Father My Son	我的阿爸我的子	You Xiuqin	
1997	—N/a	菅芒花的春天	Bai Bingbing	
1997	Emperor Jiaqing Tour Taiwan	嘉慶君遊台灣	Jin Mingzhu	
1997	—N/a	一枝草一點露		
1999	When Would You Come Again	何日君再来	Li Yulan	
1999	—N/a	親戚不計較	Ah Xi	
1999	Taiwan Liao Tianding	台灣廖添丁	Chen Suyun	
2001	Taiwan Ah Cheng	台灣阿誠	Lin Meifeng	
2004	Brothers and Sisters	兄弟姐妹	Jiang Meiling	
2005	Enchantment	海誓山盟	Zhao Shumei	
2006	Unique Flavor	天下第一味	Lin Xiuhong	
2007	—N/a	我一定要成功	Fang Lixia	
2008	Mr. Sandwich	三明治先生	Lin Fangfang	
2014	Monga Woman	艋舺的女人	Lin Chunhua	
2017	The Perfect Match	极品绝配	Cathy	
