= Roy Cheung =

Hong Kong-based actor

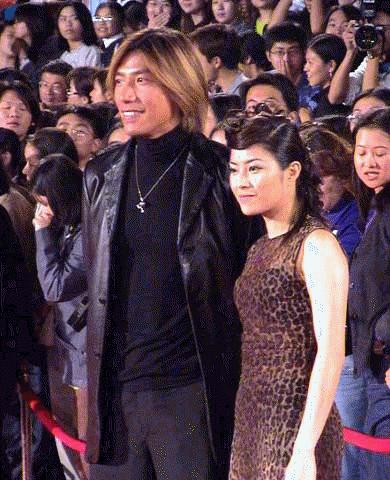
- Cheung (left) at the Golden Bauhinia Awards
- Born: Cheung Yiu Yeung; July 20, 1963 (age 63); British Hong Kong
- Occupation: Actor
- Years active: 1986–2023

Chinese name
- Traditional Chinese: 張耀揚
- Simplified Chinese: 张耀扬
Transcriptions
Standard Mandarin
- Hanyu Pinyin: Zhāng Yàoyáng

Roy Cheung Yiu-Yeung (Chinese: 張耀揚; pinyin: Zhāng Yàoyáng; born 20 July 1963 in Hong Kong) is a Hong Kong–based actor, best known on-screen for his roles as Triad gangsters in a number of films.

== Early life and career ==
As a child, Cheung idolized kung-fu legend Bruce Lee but never seriously considered a career in acting.

Starting out as a model, Cheung turned to acting when director Yonfan cast him in his 1986 film Lost Romance and the first of his many roles portraying a villain followed in the acclaimed director Ringo Lam's 1987 City on Fire.

In 1996, Cheung appeared in the 3rd, 4th and 6th installments of the Young and Dangerous series, beginning a long working relationship with director/cinematographer Andrew Lau.

== Present day ==
Recently, Cheung has appeared in a number of Andrew Lau's films, most notably in the second installment of the internationally acclaimed Infernal Affairs trilogy, and in the 1998 The Storm Riders, in which Cheung broke free of his standard villainous self altogether and portrayed a Shaolin monk.

== Filmography ==
- Lost Romance (1986)
- Escape from Coral Cove (1986) – Roy
- City on Fire (1987)
- Prison on Fire (1987)
- The Big Heat (1988)
- School on Fire (1988)
- Tiger on the Beat 2 (1988)
- Aces Go Places 5: The Terracotta Hit (1989) – Murderer King
- They Came to Rob Hong Kong (1989)
- Wild Search (1989)
- Triads: The Inside Story (1989)
- Chicken a La Queen (1990)
- Fight Back to School (1991) – Brother Teddy Big
- Hong Kong Godfather (1991) – Officer Leung
- In the Lap of God (1991) – Roy
- The Magnificent Scoundrels (1991) – Brother Tai-te
- My Flying Wife (1991) – Mr. Smartie
- Prison on Fire II (1991) – Officer 'Scarface' Hung
- Rose (1992)
- Shanghai Heroic Story (1992)
- What a Hero! (1992)
- Wicked City (1992) – Shudo
- Ghost Lantern (1993)
- Gambling Baron (1994)
- Organized Crime & Triad Bureau (film) (1994)
- To Live and Die in Tsimshatsui (1994)
- The Tragic Fantasy - Tiger of Wanchai (1994)
- The Armed Policewoman (1995)
- From the Same Family (1995)
- High Voltage (1995)
- Love, Guns & Glass (1995)
- Best of the Best (1996)
- King of Robbery (1996)
- Mongkok Story (1996)
- Once Upon a Time in Triad Society 2 (1996)
- Those Were the Days (1996)
- The Wild Couple (1996)
- Young and Dangerous 3 (1996) – Crow
- Young and Dangerous 4 (1997) – Lui Yiu-Yeung
- Beast Cops (1998)
- Leopard Hunting (1998)
- Raging Angels (1998)
- The Storm Riders (1998)
- Big Spender (1999)
- The Mission (1999)
- Slow Fade (1999)
- Born to Be King (2000)
- Jiang hu: The Triad Zone (2000)
- Bloody Cops (2000)
- Mafia.com (2000)
- Play With Strangers (2000)
- Super Car Criminals (2000)
- Unbeatables (2000)
- White Storm (2000)
- Her Name Is Cat 2: Journey to Death (2001)
- The Replacement Suspects (2001)
- The Avenging Fist (2001)
- Chinese Odyssey 2002 (2002)
- The Wesley's Mysterious File (2002)
- Deadline Crisis (2002)
- Infernal Affairs II (2003)
- Dragon the Master (2003)
- Brothers (2004)
- The Game of Killing (2004)
- Colour of the Loyalty (2005)
- Moonlight in Tokyo (2005)
- Exiled (2006)
- The Drummer (2007)
- Mini (2007)
- Linger (2008)
- A Land without Boundaries (2011)
- The Assassins (2012)
- The Five (2012)
