= Clarence Fok =

Hong Kong filmmaker and actor (1955–2024)

Clarence Fok Yiu-leung (Chinese: 霍耀良; Jyutping: fok3 jiu6 loeng4; 10 June 1955 – 1 February 2024) was a Hong Kong film director and actor. He was perhaps best known for directing the international cult classic Naked Killer (1992).

== Life and career ==
Fok was born in 1955 in Hong Kong. He graduated from the Department of Design at Hong Kong Polytechnic University. He received training as a production assistant at Rediffusion Television in 1978, gaining television production credits on In Cold Blood (1980). The following year, he joined TVB, where he helped write and direct several series including The Passenger (1979), The Bund (1980), and Five Easy Pieces (1980).

Fok started directing feature-length films while at TVB. His first released movie was Job Hunter (失業生, 1981), a youth drama starring Leslie Cheung and Danny Chan. His next project, The Man from Vietnam (1982), was his actual directorial debut completed two years prior.

He was once asked by producer Mario Kassar to direct Basic Instinct 2.

On 1 February 2024, Fok died at the Shatin Hospital in Hong Kong. He had been reportedly living with kidney cancer and heart disease. His death was announced in March 2025 by Federation of Hong Kong Filmmakers spokesperson Tin Kai-man, who had received word from Fok's family about his death the previous month.

== Awards ==
Fok was nominated as Best Supporting Actor at the 1986 Hong Kong Film Awards for his performance in Let's Make Laugh II (1985).

== Filmography ==
=== As director ===
- Special ID (2013)
- Dating a Vampire in Bed (2006)
- Don't Open Your Eyes (2006)
- Martial Angels (2001) (as Clarence Ford)
- Snakeheads (2001)
- Queen of Kowloon (2000)
- Don't Look Back... or You'll Be Sorry in Bed (2000) (as Clarence Ford)
- Century of the Dragon (1999)
- The H.K. Triad (1999)
- Her Name Is Cat (1998) (as Clarence Ford)
- Cheap Killers (1998)
- On Fire (1996)
- Thunder Cop (1996)
- Passion (1995)
- The Black Panther Warriors (1993) (as Clarence Ford)
- Remains of a Woman (1993)
- Naked Killer (1992)
- Gun n' Rose (1992)
- Crying Freeman: Dragon from Russia (1990)
- Chicken à la Queen (1990)
- The Iceman Cometh (1989)
- They Came to Rob Hong Kong (1989)
- The Greatest Lover (1988)
- Before Dawn (1984)
- Wrong Wedding Trail (1984)
- On the Wrong Track (1983)
- Job Hunter (1981)

=== As actor ===
- Body Weapon (1999)
- Project A, Part II (1987) (as Clarence Fok)
- Enchanting Night (1987)
- Armour of God (1987) - Singer
- Let's Make Laugh II (1985)
- Police Story (1985)
