= Trivisa =

2016 Hong Kong film by Frank Hui, Jevons Au and Vicky Wong

- Official film poster

Chinese name
- Traditional Chinese: 樹大招風
- Simplified Chinese: 树大招风
Transcriptions
Standard Mandarin
- Hanyu Pinyin: Shù Dà Zhāo Fēng
Yue: Cantonese
- Jyutping: Syu6 Daai6 Ziu1 Fung1
- Directed by: Frank Hui; Jevons Au; Vicky Wong
- Screenplay by: Loong Man-hong; Thomas Ng; Mak Tin-shu
- Produced by: Johnnie To; Yau Nai-hoi
- Starring: Gordon Lam; Richie Jen; Jordan Chan
- Cinematography: Zhang Ying; Ray Cheung; Rex Chan
- Edited by: Allen Leung; David Richardson
- Music by: Nigel Chan
- Production companies: Media Asia Films; Milkyway Image; Hairun Pictures
- Distributed by: Media Asia Distributions
- Release dates: 12 February 2016 (BIFF); 7 April 2016 (Hong Kong)
- Running time: 96 minutes
- Country: Hong Kong
- Language: Cantonese
- Budget: HK$5 million
- Box office: HK$9.2 million

Trivisa is a 2016 Hong Kong action crime thriller film produced by Johnnie To and Yau Nai-hoi, featuring the directorial debuts of newcomers Frank Hui, Jevons Au and Vicky Wong. The film is a fictionalized story about three real-life notorious Hong Kong mobsters, Kwai Ping-hung, Yip Kai Foon and Cheung Tze-keung, who are portrayed in the film by Gordon Lam, Richie Jen and Jordan Chan respectively. The film had its world premiere at the 66th Berlin International Film Festival's Forum section. The film also opened the 40th Hong Kong International Film Festival on 21 March 2016 and was theatrically released in Hong Kong on 7 April 2016.

In Buddhist teaching, Trivisa is the Sanskrit term for the three poisons (or the three unwholesome roots)—greed, anger and delusion—that give rise to suffering.

== Plot ==
In early 1997, mobsters Kwai Ching-hung, Yip Kwok-foon and Cheuk Tze-keung, who have never met one another, are all in Hong Kong. Thereafter, rumour has it that Hong Kong's three most notorious mobsters, known in the underworld as the "Three Kings of Thieves", are plotting together to score a final hit before the transfer of sovereignty over Hong Kong. However, none are initially aware of the rumour.

The flamboyant Cheuk is a successful kidnapper who extorts money from the rich, despite the police surveilling him. Upon hearing of the rumour, Cheuk decides to seek out Yip and Kwai to fulfil his need for a greater thrill. Cheuk sets up a hotline and offers money for those who can help him find Yip and Kwai.

In the past, Yip was a powerful and prestigious robber, but a gunfight with the Royal Hong Kong Police prompts him to flee to China, where he changes his trade to smuggling counterfeit electronics. Although successful in his business, he becomes increasingly angry due to the need to grovel to corrupt Chinese officials. Upon hearing of the rumour, Yip considers abandoning his business and picking up his gun again. After a series of humiliations, Yip decides to call Cheuk.

The cautious Kwai uses several pseudonyms to hide his identity. His expertise is in small-scale robberies, which pose minimal risk but also bring little profits. He previously killed three Hong Kong police officers when they identified him, then hid overseas for some time. He returns to Hong Kong with two mainland Chinese gangsters to rob a jewelry store. To scope out the jewelry store, Kwai goes to stay at the nearby apartment of Fai, a friend and former gang member who, with a wife and young daughter, has since gone straight. Kwai tells Fai that he sells phones, but then uses Fai's daughter to avoid suspicion while obtaining guns. Kwai hears of the rumour, but initially restrains himself from contacting Cheuk. When Kwai abandons the heist at the last minute, the gangsters do not want to return to China empty-handed, and volunteer to join Kwai in grander exploits. Kwai pretends to pay off the pair, then stabs them to death. When Fai discovers Kwai's true motives, he begs Kwai to stop endangering his family. Kwai replies that he will leave the next day, and decides to call Cheuk.

Ultimately, all three come to a sticky end. When Yip calls Cheuk at night, a local resident is disturbed and calls the Hong Kong police. Yip's fellow smugglers pose as confused mainland Chinese tourists, successfully fooling the police into letting them go. When one policeman off-handedly insults the smugglers, Yip snaps. He follows the policemen and shoots them with his AK-47, in full view of other police at a cafe. Those officers shoot Yip, who tries to crawl towards his AK-47 but soon loses his mobility because the injury is to paralyze him for life.

When Kwai calls Cheuk at night, Kwai is led to brag about his exploits to confirm his identity. Fai, who was unaware of how successful Kwai's robberies were, awakens and overhears this. When Kwai suspects that Fai overheard, Kwai opens the family's bedroom door with knife in hand, while Fai pretends to sleep. Kwai ultimately does not act against Fai and his family. When Kwai awakens, he finds that a police SWAT team is converging on the apartment, while Fai and his family have already fled.

Cheuk is tricked into meeting Yip's former associate, now an arms dealer, having been told Yip would be present. At the meeting, Cheuk is contacted by both Yip and Kwai. The arms dealer attempts to kidnap Cheuk for a ransom, but Cheuk dispatches him and escapes with a truck full of dynamite to use in a grand scheme with Yip and Kwai. However, Cheuk hits a motorcyclist, crashing the truck. As Cheuk is piling the spilt dynamite back onto the truck, the police arrive and Cheuk surrenders.

The movie finally reveals, in flashback, that Cheuk, Yip and Kwai once came across each other at the same restaurant in 1997, unaware of each others' identities. This is where the rumour stems from. The film closes on footage of the 1997 Hong Kong handover ceremony.

== Cast ==
- Gordon Lam as Kwai Ching-hung (季正雄, based on Kwai Ping-hung)
- Richie Jen as Yip Kwok-foon (葉國歡, based on Yip Kai-foon)
- Jordan Chan as Cheuk Tze-keung (卓子強, based on Cheung Tze-keung)
- Tommy Wong as The Fence (銷贓佬)
- Elliot Ngok as Ho Yu-kei (何裕基)
- Stephen Au as Inspector Wu (胡警官)
- Lam Suet as Boss Fong (方老闆)
- Wan Yeung-ming as Old Dog (老狗)
- Philip Keung as Fai (大輝)
- Frankie Ng as Ting (鼎爺)
- Lau Ka-yung as Master Sai (師傅細)
- Hung Yan-yan as Kwan-sai (昆西)
- To Yin-gor as Commander (連長)
- Zhang Kai as Hong Qi (紅旗)
- Le Zi-long as Wong Lei (王磊)
- Thimjapo Chattida as Noon
- Aoi Ma as Bo (寶兒)
- Kam Loi-kwan as Kam (阿金)
- Huang Kai-sen as Chung (阿忠)
- Jimmy Wong as Fisherman
- Ben Yuen as Chief Chen (陳科)
- Yan Zi-fei as Chief Chen's mistress
- Law Chi-sing as Gui (阿貴)
- Ho Ka-wah as Guang (阿廣)
- Hui Ping-hang as Chief Long (龍科)
- Li Ying-to as Chief Song (宋局)
- Leung Kin-ping as Manager Fok (霍經理)
- Chiu Chi-shing as Condor (秃鷹)
- Lee Man-piu as Lung (速龍)
- Keung Kam-shan as Policewoman
- Keung Kam-kui as Policeman
- Wong Wai-tong as Policeman
- Law Tsin-wong as News reporter
- Yu Tat-chi as Cheng Kin-kuen (鄭建權)
- Yang Yu-fei as Customs officer
- Hu Bin-hui as Comrade
- Flora Cheung as Informer
- Lam Ka-shing as Customers officer
- Wong Gar-ling as Informer
- Jamie Lee as Informer
- Chow Pok-fu as Informer
- Yan Ngai-to as Informer
- Wong Che-keuong as Informer
- Ng Kwok-ming as Informer
- Cheung Pet-wu as Informer
- Yeung Sai-ho as Policeman
- Ursula Lin as Waitress
- Kwok Yuk-keung as Policeman
- Ho Ka-fai as Informer
- Daniel Kwok
- Skyline Leung

== Reception ==
=== Box office ===
The film grossed HK$3,392,095 during its first three days of release in Hong Kong and opening at No. 3 during its debut weekend. By the end of its fifth week, the film has grossed about HK$9,180,000.

=== Critical reception ===
Clarence Tsui of The Hollywood Reporter gave the film a positive praising the performances of Richie Jen and Gordon Lam, the editing by Allen Leung and David Richardson and calls it "an impressive calling card signalling brighter cinematic futures." Fionnuala Halligan of Screen Daily praised the film's set design and editing and believes the film will "clearly attract festival interest.". Edmond Lee of the South China Morning Post rated film a score of 4/5 stars and praises the film's bold vision and how newcomer directors Frank Hui, Jevons Au and Vicky Wong "couldn't have made a stronger start to their fledgling careers."

== Controversy ==
Trivisa was banned in mainland China. When it won the Hong Kong Film Award for Best Film in 2017, the broadcast was blacked out on Mainland TVs.

In late 2015, Cheung Wai-chuen, owner of a film properties company, and Law Yun-lam, a logistics firm employee, were arrested for possession of counterfeit money that was used in Trivisa without the proper permits for storage and transportation, which the film's producers were responsible for securing. Despite being marked as props, the judge felt that the fake money looked too real: saying "Nobody could rule out the risk of people stealing these fakes and using them as real money." Cheung and Law were sentenced to four months in prison by a Hong Kong district court in May 2018, a sentence that was suspended for two years. The Federation of Hong Kong Filmmakers condemned the case stating "This is against the industry's dedication to professionalism in filmmaking. The authorities' took on a case that case was unjust. Members of the Hong Kong film industry are not only disappointed and furious, it also sends shivers down our spines." Some film industry members suspected the case was influenced by Mainland China.

== Awards and nominations ==
Awards and nominations
Ceremony	Category	Recipient	Outcome
53rd Golden Horse Awards	Best Feature Film	Trivisa	Nominated
53rd Golden Horse Awards	Best New Director	Frank Hui, Jevons Au, Vicky Wong	Nominated
53rd Golden Horse Awards	Best Original Screenplay	Loong Man-hong, Thomas Ng, Mak Tin-shu	Won
53rd Golden Horse Awards	Best Makeup & Costume Design	Suki Yip	Nominated
53rd Golden Horse Awards	Best Film Editing	Allen Leung, David Richardson	Won
11th Asian Film Awards	Best Actor	Richie Jen	Nominated
11th Asian Film Awards	Best Supporting Actor	Lam Suet	Won
11th Asian Film Awards	Best Screenplay	Mak Tin-shu, Loong Man-hong, Thomas Ng	Nominated
Hong Kong Film Critics Society Award	Best Film	Trivisa	Won
Hong Kong Film Critics Society Award	Best Actor	Gordon Lam	Won
36th Hong Kong Film Awards	Best Film	Trivisa	Won
36th Hong Kong Film Awards	Best Director	Frank Hui, Jevons Au, Vicky Wong	Won
36th Hong Kong Film Awards	Best Screenplay	Loong Man Hong, Thomas Ng, Mak Tin Shu	Won
36th Hong Kong Film Awards	Best Actor	Richie Jen	Nominated
36th Hong Kong Film Awards	Best Actor	Gordan Lam	Won
36th Hong Kong Film Awards	Best Supporting Actor	Philip Keung	Nominated
36th Hong Kong Film Awards	Best Film Editing	Allen Leung, David Richardson	Won

== See also ==
- Johnnie To filmography
