= Hong Kong Film Award for Best Screenplay =

Annual Chinese film award

- Country: Hong Kong
- Presented by: Hong Kong Film Awards
- First award: 1982
- Currently held by: Anselm Chan, Cheng Wai-kei — The Last Dance

The Hong Kong Film Award for Best Screenplay is an award presented annually at the Hong Kong Film Awards for best screenplay in a Hong Kong film.

== Winners and nominees ==
=== 1980s ===
Year	Film	Original Title	Nominee
1982 (1st)	The Story of Woo Viet	胡越的故事	Alfred Cheung
1983 (2nd)	Boat People	投奔怒海	Dai An-Ping
1983 (2nd)	Nomad	烈火青春	Yau Kong-Kin, Chan Koonchung, Joyce Chan Wan-Man, Eddie Fong Ling-Ching, Patrick Tam, & Kam Ping-Hing
1983 (2nd)	Lonely Fifteen	靚妹仔	Manfred Wong
1983 (2nd)	Once Upon a Mirage	細圈仔	Lilian Lee
1983 (2nd)	Tiger Killer	武松	Li Han-hsiang
1984 (3rd)	Let's Make Laugh	表錯七日情	Alfred Cheung
1984 (3rd)	The Dead and the Deadly	人嚇人	Sammo Hung & Barry Wong
1984 (3rd)	Health Warning	打擂台	Liu Wing-Leung
1984 (3rd)	Ah Ying	半邊人	Si Yeung-Ping & Peter Wang
1984 (3rd)	Reign Behind a Curtain	垂簾聽政	Li Han-Xiang & Yeung Chuen-Cham
1985 (4th)	Homecoming	似水流年	Liang Kong
1985 (4th)	Teppanyaki	鐵板燒	Michael Hui
1985 (4th)	Hong Kong 1941	等待黎明	John Chan
1985 (4th)	Long Arm of the Law	省港旗兵	Philip Chan
1985 (4th)	Everlasting Love	停不了的愛	Manfred Wong
1986 (5th)	Love With The Perfect Stranger	錯點鴛鴦	Lu Jianming & Deng Rongluan
1986 (5th)	The Unwritten Law	法外情	Ng See-yuen
1986 (5th)	The Illegal Immigrant	非法移民	Alex Law
1986 (5th)	Mr Vampire	殭屍先生	Wong Ying, Barry Wong, & Szeto Cheuk-Hon
1986 (5th)	Women	女人心	Kit Lai & Yau-tai On-ping
1987 (6th)	Love Unto Waste	地下情	Kit Lai & Yau-tai On-ping
1987 (6th)	Just Like Weather	美國心	Ng Chong Chau
1987 (6th)	A Better Tomorrow	英雄本色	John Woo
1987 (6th)	Chocolate Inspector	神探朱古力	Michael Hui & Philip Chan
1987 (6th)	The Lunatics	癲佬正傳	Derek Yee
1987 (6th)	The Last Emperor	火龍	Wong Hing Cheung & Zhou Qi Yue
1988 (7th)	An Autumn's Tale	秋天的童話	Alex Law
1988 (7th)	Final Victory	最後勝利	Wong Kar-wai
1988 (7th)	City on Fire	龍虎風雲	Tommy Shum Sai-Sing
1988 (7th)	Prison on Fire	監獄風雲	Yin Nam
1988 (7th)	Wonder Women	神奇兩女俠 / 胭脂雙響炮	Kwok-Leung Gan
1989 (8th)	Heart to Hearts	三人世界	Lip Wang Fung, Siu Kwok Wah, Gordon Chan, & Yip Kwong Kim
1989 (8th)	Painted Faces	七小福	Alex Law & Mabel Cheung
1989 (8th)	Last Eunuch in China	中國最後一個太監	Eddie Fong Ling-Ching
1989 (8th)	The Other Half and the Other Half	我愛太空人 / 私愛太空人	Eddie Fong Ling-Ching
1989 (8th)	Rouge	胭脂扣	Chiu-Tai An-ping & Lilian Lee

=== 1990s ===
Year	Film	Original Title	Nominee
1990 (9th)	Beyond the Sunset	飛越黃昏	Jacob Cheung & Chan Kam Cheung
1990 (9th)	All About Ah Long	阿郎的故事	Ng Man Fai & Philip Cheng Chung Tai
1990 (9th)	The Killer	喋血雙雄	John Woo
1990 (9th)	The Yuppie Fantasia	小男人周記	Lip Wang Fung, Wong Man Yu, Lau Shek Yin, & Gordon Chan
1990 (9th)	Bachelor's Swan Song	再見王老五	Derek Yee & Wong Chi Yat
1990 (9th)	Eight Taels of Gold	八両金	Alex Law & Mabel Cheung
1991 (10th)	Queen of Temple Street	廟街皇后	Chan Man-Keung
1991 (10th)	Red Dust	滾滾紅塵	Sanmao & Yim Ho
1991 (10th)	Farewell China	愛在別鄉的季節	Eddie Fong Ling Ching
1991 (10th)	Days of Being Wild	阿飛正傳	Wong Kar-wai
1991 (10th)	Song of the Exile	客途秋恨	Wu Nien-jen
1992 (11th)	To Be Number One	跛豪	Johnny Mak Tong Hung & Stephen Siu
1992 (11th)	This Thing Called Love	婚姻勿語	Lee Chi-Ngai
1992 (11th)	Lee Rock	五億探長雷洛傳	Chan Man-Keung
1992 (11th)	Alan and Eric: Between Hello and Goodbye	雙城故事	Barry Wong & Lee Chi-Ngai
1992 (11th)	Fight Back to School	逃學威龍	Barry Wong & Gordon Chan
1993 (12th)	Cageman	籠民	Yank Wong, Ng Chong Chau, & Jacob Cheung
1993 (12th)	Center Stage	阮玲玉	Peggy Chiu
1993 (12th)	Justice, My Foot!	審死官	Sandy Shaw
1993 (12th)	92 Legendary La Rose Noire	92黑玫瑰對黑玫瑰	Jeffrey Lau
1993 (12th)	King of Beggars	武狀元蘇乞兒	Chan Kin Chong
1994 (13th)	C'est la vie, mon chéri	新不了情	Derek Yee
1994 (13th)	Yesteryou Yesterme Yesterday	記得香蕉成熟時	Lee Chi-Ngai
1994 (13th)	Always on My Mind	搶錢夫妻	James Yuen
1994 (13th)	Tom, Dick and Hairy	風塵三俠	Lee Chi-Ngai, James Yuen, & Chan Hing-Kai
1994 (13th)	Legal Innocence	溶屍奇案	Rico Chung Kai-Cheong, Jason Lam, & Chung Oi Fan
1994 (13th)	Lord of the East China Sea	歲月風雲之上海皇帝	Johnny Mak Tong Hung & Stephen Shiu
1995 (14th)	I Have A Date With Spring	我和春天有個約會	Raymond To
1995 (14th)	Twenty Something	晚9朝5	James Yuen
1995 (14th)	He's A Woman, She's A Man	金枝玉葉	James Yuen & Lee Chi-Ngai
1995 (14th)	Ashes of Time	東邪西毒	Wong Kar-wai
1995 (14th)	Chungking Express	重慶森林	Wong Kar-wai
1996 (15th)	Summer Snow	女人四十	Chan Man-Keung
1996 (15th)	Full Throttle	烈火戰車	Derek Yee & Law Chi-leung
1996 (15th)	A Chinese Odyssey Part 1: Pandora's Box	西遊記大結局之仙履奇緣	Jeffrey Lau
1996 (15th)	A Chinese Odyssey Part 2: Cinderella	西遊記第壹佰零壹回之月光寶盒	Jeffrey Lau
1996 (15th)	The Umbrella Story	人間有情	Raymond To
1997 (16th)	Comrades: Almost a Love Story	甜蜜蜜	Ivy Ho
1997 (16th)	Hu-Du-Men	虎度門	Raymond To
1997 (16th)	Once Upon A Time in Triad Society	旺角揸Fit人	Rico Chung Kai-Cheong
1997 (16th)	Once Upon A Time in Triad Society 2	去吧！揸Fit人兵團	Rico Chung Kai-Cheong
1997 (16th)	Lost and Found	天涯海角	Lee Chi-Ngai
1997 (16th)	Love and Sex Among the Ruins	張志成	Cheung Chi-Sing
1998 (17th)	The Mad Phoenix	南海十三郎	Raymond To
1998 (17th)	The Soong Sisters	宋家皇朝	Alex Law
1998 (17th)	Island of Greed	黑金	Johnny Mak Tong Hung
1998 (17th)	Too Many Ways to Be No. 1	一個字頭的誕生	Wai Ka-Fai, Matt Chow, & Szeto Kam-Yuen
1998 (17th)	Made in Hong Kong	香港製造	Fruit Chan
1999 (18th)	Beast Cops	野獸刑警	Chan Hing-Kai & Gordon Chan
1999 (18th)	City of Glass	玻璃之城	Alex Law & Mabel Cheung
1999 (18th)	The Longest Summer	去年煙花特別多	Fruit Chan
1999 (18th)	Expect the Unexpected	非常突然	Szeto Kam-Yuen, Yau Nai-hoi, & Taures Chow
1999 (18th)	The Longest Nite	暗花	Szeto Kam-Yuen & Yau Nai-hoi

=== 2000s ===
Year	Film	Original Title	Nominee
2000 (19th)	Tempting Heart		Sylvia Chang & Cat Kwan
2000 (19th)	Metade Fumaca		Riley Yip
2000 (19th)	Running Out of Time		Yau Nai-Hoi, Laurent Courtiaud, & Julien Carbon
2000 (19th)	Little Cheung		Fruit Chan
2000 (19th)	Ordinary Heroes		Chan King-chung
2001 (20th)	Durian Durian		Fruit Chan
2001 (20th)	Jiang Hu - The Triad Zone		Chan Hing-Kai & Amy Chin
2001 (20th)	In the Mood for Love		Wong Kar-wai
2001 (20th)	Crouching Tiger, Hidden Dragon		Wang Hui-ling, James Schamus, & Tsai Kuo-jung
2001 (20th)	Needing You...		Wai Ka-Fai & Yau Nai-Hoi
2002 (21st)	July Rhapsody		Ivy Ho
2002 (21st)	Shaolin Soccer		Stephen Chow & Tsang Kan-Cheung
2002 (21st)	Merry-Go-Round		GC Goo-Bi
2002 (21st)	You Shoot, I Shoot		Vincent Kok & Pang Ho-Cheung
2002 (21st)	Lan Yu		Jimmy Ngai
2003 (22nd)	Infernal Affairs		Alan Mak & Felix Chong
2003 (22nd)	Hero		Li Feng, Zhang Yimou, & Wang Bin
2003 (22nd)	Hollywood Hong Kong		Fruit Chan
2003 (22nd)	Double Vision		Su Chao-pin, Chen Kuo-fu
2003 (22nd)	Three		Jo Jo Hui & Matt Chow
2004 (23rd)	Running On Karma		Wai Ka-Fai, Yau Nai-hoi, Au Kin-Yee, & Yip Tin-Shing
2004 (23rd)	Infernal Affairs II		Alan Mak & Felix Chong
2004 (23rd)	PTU		Yau Nai-hoi & Au Kin-Yee
2004 (23rd)	Infernal Affairs III		Alan Mak & Felix Chong
2004 (23rd)	Lost In Time		James Yuen & Jessica Fong
2005 (24th)	One Nite In Mongkok	旺角黑夜	Derek Yee
2005 (24th)	2046	2046	Wong Kar-wai
2005 (24th)	A-1	A-1頭條	Gordon Chan & Rico Chung Kai-Cheong
2005 (24th)	Kung Fu Hustle	功夫	Stephen Chow, Tsang Kan-Cheung, Lola Huo, & Chan Man-Keung
2005 (24th)	Dumplings	餃子	Lilian Lee
2006 (25th)	Election	黑社會	Yau Nai-Hoi & Yip Tin-Shing
2006 (25th)	Perhaps Love	如果·愛	Aubrey Lam & Raymond To
2006 (25th)	2 Young	早熟	Derek Yee & Chun Tin-Nam
2006 (25th)	Crazy N' the City	神經俠侶	James Yuen, Jessica Fong, & Lo Yiu-Fai
2006 (25th)	Wait 'Til You're Older	童夢奇緣	Cheung Chi-Kwong & Susan Chan Suk-yin
2007 (26th)	After This Our Exile	父子	Patrick Tam & Tian Koi-Leong
2007 (26th)	Happy Birthday	生日快樂	Sylvia Chang, Mathias Woo, & Theresa Tang
2007 (26th)	My Name is Fame	我要成名	James Yuen, Jessica Fong, & Lo Yiu-Fai
2007 (26th)	Election 2	黑社會以和為貴	Yau Nai-Hoi & Yip Tin-Shing
2007 (26th)	Confession Of Pain	傷城	Felix Chong & Alan Mak
2008 (27th)	Mad Detective	神探	Wai Ka-Fai & Au Kin-Yee
2008 (27th)	The Warlords	投名狀	Xu Lan, Chun Tin Nam, Aubrey Lam, Huang Jianxin, Jojo Hui, Ho Kei Ping, Guo Jun-Li, James Yuen
2008 (27th)	Protégé	門徒	Derek Yee, Chun Tin-Nam, Loong Man-Hong & Go Sun
2008 (27th)	The Postmodern Life of My Aunt	姨媽的后現代生活	Li Qiang
2008 (27th)	Eye in the Sky	跟蹤	Yau Nai-Hoi & Au Kin-Yee
2009 (28th)	The Way We Are	天水圍的日與夜	Lou Shiu-Wa
2009 (28th)	Run Papa Run	一個好爸爸	Susan Chan Suk-Yin, Sylvia Chang, & Mathias Woo
2009 (28th)	Painted Skin	畫皮	Gordon Chan, Lau Ho-Leung, & Abe Kwong Man Wai
2009 (28th)	Beast Stalker	証人	Jack Ng & Dante Lam
2009 (28th)	Claustrophobia	親密	Ivy Ho

=== 2010s ===
Year	Film	Original Title	Nominee
2010 (29th)	Echoes of the Rainbow	歲月神偷	Alex Law
2010 (29th)	Bodyguards and Assassins	十月圍城	Guo Jun-Li, Qin Tiannan, Joyce Chan, & Chan Tong-Man
2010 (29th)	Written By	再生號	Wai Ka-fai & Au Kin-yee
2010 (29th)	Accident	意外	Szeto Kam-yuen, Nicholl Tang & Milkyway Creative Team
2010 (29th)	Overheard	竊聽風雲	Alan Mak & Felix Chong
2011 (30th)	Love in a Puff	志明與春嬌	Pang Ho-cheung & Heiward Mak
2011 (30th)	Break Up Club	分手說愛你	Lawrence Cheng Tan-shui & Wong Chun-chun
2011 (30th)	Crossing Hennessy	月滿軒尼詩	Ivy Ho
2011 (30th)	Gallants	打擂台	Derek Kwok, Clement Cheng & Frankie Tam Kwong-yuen
2011 (30th)	The Stool Pigeon	綫人	Jack Ng
2012 (31st)	A Simple Life	桃姐	Susan Chan Suk-Yin
2012 (31st)	Don't Go Breaking My Heart	單身男女	Wai Ka-Fai, Yau Nai-hoi, Ryker Chan, & Jevons Au
2012 (31st)	Life without Principle	奪命金	Milkyway Creative Team, Au Kin-Yee, & Wong King-Fai
2012 (31st)	Overheard 2	竊聽風雲2	Alan Mak & Felix Chong
2012 (31st)	Let the Bullets Fly	讓子彈飛	Zhu Sujin, Shu Ping, Jiang Wen, Guo Jun-Li, Wei Xiao, Li Bukong
2013 (32nd)	Cold War	寒戰	Longman Leung & Sunny Luk
2013 (32nd)	Vulgaria	低俗喜劇	Pang Ho-cheung, Lam Chiu-wing, & Luk Yee-sum
2013 (32nd)	Love in the Buff	春嬌與志明	Pang Ho-cheung & Luk Yee-sum
2013 (32nd)	The Bullet Vanishes	消失的子彈	Law Chi-leung & Sin Ling Yeung
2013 (32nd)	The Silent War	聽風者	Alan Mak Siu-fai & Felix Chong
2014 (33rd)	The Grandmaster	一代宗師	Zou Jingzhi, Xu Haofeng, & Wong Kar-wai
2014 (33rd)	American Dreams in China	中國合伙人	Zhou Zhiyong, Zhang Ji, & Aubrey Lam
2014 (33rd)	Finding Mr. Right	北京遇上西雅圖	Xue Xiaolu
2014 (33rd)	Blind Detective	盲探	Wai Ka-fai, Yau Nai-Hoi, Ryker Chan, & Yu Xi
2014 (33rd)	Unbeatable	激戰	Jack Ng, Fung Chi-fung, & Dante Lam
2015 (34th)	Overheard 3	竊聽風雲3	Alan Mak & Felix Chong
2015 (34th)	The Midnight After	那夜凌晨，我坐上了旺角開往大埔的紅VAN	Chan Fai-Hung, Kong Ho-Yan, & Fruit Chan
2015 (34th)	Aberdeen	香港仔	Pang Ho-cheung
2015 (34th)	The Golden Era	黃金時代	Li Qiang
2015 (34th)	Dearest	親愛的	Zhang Ji
2016 (35th)	Port of Call	踏血尋梅	Philip Yung
2016 (35th)	Little Big Master	五個小孩的校長	Adrian Kwan & Hannah Chang
2016 (35th)	I Am Somebody	我是路人甲	Derek Yee
2016 (35th)	She Remembers, He Forgets	哪一天我們會飛	Saville Chan & Adam Wong
2016 (35th)	Two Thumbs Up	衝鋒車	Lau Ho-Leung
2017 (36th)	Trivisa	樹大招風	Loong Man Hong, Thomas Ng, & Mak Tin-shu
2017 (36th)	Mad World	一念無明	Florence Chan
2017 (36th)	Soul Mate	七月與安生	Lam Wing-sum, Li Yuan, Xu Yi-meng, & Wu Nan
2017 (36th)	The Mermaid	美人魚	Stephen Chow, Lee Si Zhen Kelvin, Ho Miu Ki, Lu Zheng Yu, Fung Chih Chiang, Chan Hing-Kai, Y. Y. Kong, Tsang Kan-Cheung
2017 (36th)	Cold War 2	寒戰 2	Longman Leung, Sunny Luk, Jack Ng
2018 (37th)	Love Education	相愛相親	Sylvia Chang & You Xiaoying
2018 (37th)	29+1	29+1	Kearen Pang
2018 (37th)	Our Time Will Come	明月幾時有	Ho Kei-ping
2018 (37th)	Love Off the Cuff	春嬌救志明	Pang Ho-cheung, Jimmy Wan, & Luk Yee-sum
2018 (37th)	Somewhere Beyond the Mist	藍天白雲	Cheung King-wai
2019 (38th)	Project Gutenberg	無雙	Felix Chong
2019 (38th)	A Family Tour	自由行	Chan Wai, 33, & Ying Liang
2019 (38th)	Men On The Dragon	逆流大叔	Sunny Chan
2019 (38th)	Still Human	淪落人	Oliver Chan Siu-kuen
2019 (38th)	Tracey	翠絲	Shu Kei, Erica Li, & Jun Li

=== 2020s ===
Year	Film	Original Title	Nominee
2020 (39th)	Better Days	少年的你	Lam Wing Sum, Li Yuan, & Xu Yimeng
2020 (39th)	Beyond The Dream	幻愛	Felix Tsang & Kiwi Chow
2020 (39th)	Suk Suk	叔‧叔	Ray Yeung
2020 (39th)	Fagara	花椒之味	Heiward Mak
2020 (39th)	My Prince Edward	金都	Norris Wong
2022 (40th)	Limbo	智齒	Au Kin-yee, Shum Kwan Sin
2022 (40th)	One Second Champion	一秒拳王	Ashley Cheung Yin Kei, Ho Siu Hong, Li Ho Tin, Ling Wai Chun
2022 (40th)	Time	殺出個黃昏	Ho Ching Yi, Gordon Lam
2022 (40th)	Zero to Hero	媽媽的神奇小子	Jimmy Wan, David Lo
2022 (40th)	Drifting	濁水漂流	Jun Li
2023 (41st)	Detective vs Sleuths	神探大戰	Wai Ka-fai, Ryker Chan, & Mak Tin Shu
2023 (41st)	The Sparring Partner	正義迴廊	Frankie Tam, Oliver Yip, & Thomas Leung
2023 (41st)	The Sunny Side of the Street	白日青春	Lau Kok Rui
2023 (41st)	The Narrow Road	窄路微塵	Fean Chung
2023 (41st)	Table for Six	飯戲攻心	Sunny Chan
2024 (42nd)	Mad Fate	命案	Melvin Li, Yau Nai-hoi
2024 (42nd)	In Broad Daylight	白日之下	Lawrence Kan, Li Cheuk-fung, & Tong Chui-ping
2024 (42nd)	Time Still Turns the Pages	年少日記	Nick Cheuk
2024 (42nd)	The Goldfinger	金手指	Felix Chong
2024 (42nd)	A Guilty Conscience	毒舌大狀	Jack Ng, Jay Cheung, & Terry Lam
2025 (43rd)	The Last Dance	破·地獄	Anselm Chan, Cheng Wai-kei
2025 (43rd)	Love Lies	我談的那場戀愛	Ho Miu Ki, Chan Hing-Kai
2025 (43rd)	Papa	爸爸	Philip Yung
2025 (43rd)	All Shall Be Well	從今以後	Ray Yeung
2025 (43rd)	Rob N Roll	臨時劫案	Albert Mak, Ryker Chan, & Man Uen-Ching

== Multiple wins and nominations ==
=== Multiple wins ===
Wins	Screenwriter
3
3	Felix Chong
3	Au Kin-Yee
3	Wai Ka-Fai
3	Yau Nai-hoi
2
2	Alfred Cheung
2	Alex Law
2	Gordon Chan
2	Jacob Cheung
2	Raymond To
2	Chan Man-Keung
2	Ivy Ho
2	Sylvia Chang
2	Alan Mak
2	Yip Tin-Shing
2	Derek Yee

=== Multiple nominations ===
Nominations	Screenwriter
12	Yau Nai-hoi
10	Felix Chong
8	James Yuen
8	Alan Mak
8	Derek Yee
8	Wai Ka-Fai
7	Wong Kar-wai
7	Alex Law
7	Au Kin-Yee
6	Gordon Chan
6	Lee Chi-Ngai
6	Fruit Chan
6	Pang Ho-cheung
5	Raymond To
5	Jack Ng
5	Chan Hing-Kai
4	Eddie Fong Ling-Ching
4	Barry Wong
4	Chan Man-Keung
4	Rico Chung Kai-Cheong
4	Ivy Ho
4	Szeto Kam-Yuen
4	Sylvia Chang
4	Ryker Chan
3	Lilian Lee
3	Mabel Cheung
3	Johnny Mak Tong Hung
3	Jeffrey Lau
3	Stephen Chow
3	Tsang Kan-Cheung
3	Yip Tin-Shing
3	Jessica Fong
3	Aubrey Lam
3	Susan Chan Suk-yin
3	Guo Jun-Li
3	Luk Yee-sum
