= List of crime films of 1998 =

This is a list of crime films released in 1998.

Title	Director	Cast	Country	Notes
American History X	Tony Kaye	Edward Norton, Edward Furlong, Fairuza Balk, Avery Brooks, Beverly D'Angelo, Stacy Keach, Elliott Gould, Jennifer Lien, Ethan Suplee, William Russ	United States	Crime drama
Beast Cops	Gordon Chan, Dante Lam	Michael Wong, Anthony Wong, Kathy Chau	Hong Kong	Crime drama
The Big Lebowski	Joel Coen	Jeff Bridges, John Goodman, Julianne Moore, Steve Buscemi	United States	Crime comedy
The Black Angel	Takashi Ishii	Riona Hazuki, Jimpachi Nezu, Miyuki Ono	Japan	
The Boys	Rowan Woods	David Wenham, Toni Collette, Lynette Curran	Australia	
Bullet Ballet	Shinya Tsukamoto	Shinya Tsukamoto, Kirina Mano, Tatsuya Nakamura	Japan	Crime thriller
Clay Pigeons	David Dobkin	Vince Vaughn, Janeane Garofalo, Joaquin Phoenix	United States	
Everybody Loves Sunshine	Andrew Goth	Goldie, Andrew Goth, David Bowie	United Kingdom	
Expect The Unexpected	Patrick Yau		Hong Kong	
The General	John Boorman	Brendan Gleeson, Adrian Dunbar, Jon Voight	Ireland; United Kingdom	
Heaven	Scott Reynolds	Martin Donovan, Daniel Edwards, Joanna Going	New Zealand; United States	
Hell's Kitchen	Tony Cinciripini	Mekhi Phifer, Rosanna Arquette, William Forsythe	{United States	
Killing Time	Bharat Nalluri	Craig Fairbrass, Nigel Leach, Kendra Torgan	United Kingdom	
Lock, Stock and Two Smoking Barrels	Guy Ritchie	Jason Flemyng, Dexter Fletcher, Nick Moran	United Kingdom	
The Longest Nite	Yau Tat-chi	Lau Ching-Wan, Tony Leung Chiu-Wai, Maggie Shiu	Hong Kong	
Mafia!	Jim Abrahams	Jay Mohr, Billy Burke, Christina Applegate, Lloyd Bridges, Olympia Dukakis	United States	Crime comedy
Monument Ave.	Ted Demme	Denis Leary, Famke Janssen, Jason Barry, Billy Crudup	United States	Crime drama
Out of Sight	Steven Soderbergh	George Clooney, Jennifer Lopez, Ving Rhames, Don Cheadle, Dennis Farina, Albert Brooks	United States	
Palmetto	Volker Schlöndorff	Woody Harrelson, Elisabeth Shue, Gina Gershon	United States; Germany	Crime thriller
Safe Men	John Hamburg	Sam Rockwel, Steve Zahn, Paul Giamatti	United States	Crime comedy
A Simple Plan	Sam Raimi	Bill Paxton, Billy Bob Thornton, Bridget Fonda, Brent Briscoe, Gary Cole	United States	Crime drama
Snake Eyes	Brian De Palma	Nicolas Cage, Gary Sinise, Carla Gugino, John Heard, Kevin Dunn, Stan Shaw	United States	Crime thriller
Southie	John Shea	Donnie Wahlberg, Rose McGowan, Anne Meara	United States	
Thursday	Skip Woods	Thomas Jane, Aaron Eckhart, Paulina Porizkova	United States	
Wild Things	John McNaughton	Kevin Bacon, Matt Dillon, Neve Campbell, Denise Richards, Theresa Russell, Daphne Rubin-Vega, Robert Wagner, Bill Murray	United States	Crime thriller
Young and Dangerous 5	Andrew Lau	Ekin Cheng, Jordan Chan	Hong Kong	Gangster film
