= The Illegal Immigrant =

1985 Hong Kong film by Mabel Cheung

- Film poster
- Traditional Chinese: 非法移民
- Simplified Chinese: 非法移民
- Hanyu Pinyin: Fēi Fǎ Yí Mín
- Jyutping: Fei1 Faat3 Ji4 Man4
- Directed by: Mabel Cheung
- Written by: Alex Law
- Produced by: Mona Fong
- Starring: Ching Yung-cho; Cindy Ou; Liao Chung-yu; Peter Lee Kui-yuen
- Cinematography: Bobby Bukowski
- Edited by: Fong Bo-Wa; Chiang Hsing-Lung
- Music by: So Jan-Hau; Shing Chin-Yung
- Production company: Shaw Brothers Studio
- Release date: 3 May 1985 (Hong Kong)
- Running time: 92 minutes
- Country: British Hong Kong
- Language: Cantonese
- Budget: HK$1,000,000
- Box office: HK$4,723,687

The Illegal Immigrant is a 1985 Hong Kong film directed by Mabel Cheung with the screenplay written by Alex Law. As Cheung's debut film, it tells about the story of a Chinese illegal immigrant in the United States seeking for his legal status through a sham marriage who falls in love with his fake bride.

The film, along with An Autumn's Tale and Eight Taels of Gold, formed Cheung and Law's "Migration Trilogy".

== Plot ==
Cheung (played by Ching Yung-cho), who smuggles to New York City via Hong Kong from China, becomes a handyman in a factory in Chinatown, Manhattan to repay for his smuggling fees. One day, he is arrested by the Immigration and Naturalization Service, facing the risk of deportation. To maintain a legal status to stay in the States, Cheung arranges to pay for a sham marriage with a Chinese American Cindy Li (played by Cindy Ou), but they fall in love afterwards. When they prepare for the formal wedding, Li is shot during a gun fight among Chinatown triads.

== Cast ==
- Ching Yung-cho
- Cindy Ou
- Liao Chung-yu
- Peter Lee Kui-yuen

== Production ==
The film was Cheung's debut film, which was also her graduation production at the New York University Tisch School of the Arts. According to Cheung, the film was inspired by a friend renting videotapes in the shop which Cheung served as a part-time staff, and real cases in Chinatown. With the introduction of Alfred Cheung, who studied in NYU for a semester, Cheung got to know Mona Fong, the director of Shaw Brothers who was visiting New York for cinematographic equipment. As Fong had promised to contribute to productions by Chinese students, after Cheung and Law finished the screenplay of the film, Cheung got back to Hong Kong to contact Fong. Fong then agreed to contribute US$150,000 for the production of the film.

Due to insufficient funds for the film, outdated film stocks from the school and production companies and borrowed movie cameras were used during the production. Most of the cast and crew, including the leading actor Ching Yung-cho, were classmates of Cheung and Law. Cindy Ou, a School of Medicine student, was chosen to be the leading actress under a casting, with Cheung dubbing her voice.

== Box office ==
The film grossed HK$4,723,687 during its theatrical run between 3 and 16 May 1985.

== Awards and nominations ==
Awards and nominations
Ceremony	Category	Recipient	Outcome
5th Hong Kong Film Awards	Best Film	The Illegal Immigrant	Nominated
5th Hong Kong Film Awards	Best Director	Mabel Cheung	Won
5th Hong Kong Film Awards	Best Screenplay	Alex Law	Nominated
22nd Golden Horse Awards	Best Original Screenplay	Alex Law	Nominated
30th Asia-Pacific Film Festival	Jury Special Award	The Illegal Immigrant	Won
