= 18th Hong Kong Film Awards =

1999 Hong Kong Film Awards

- Date: 25 April 1999
- Site: Hong Kong Cultural Centre
- Hosted by: Carol Cheng, Cheung Tat Ming, Vincent Kok, Chin Ka Lok and Jerry Lamb

The 18th Hong Kong Film Awards ceremony, honored the best films of 1998 and took place on 25 April 1999 at Hong Kong Academy for Performing Arts, Wan Chai, Hong Kong. The ceremony was hosted by Carol Cheng, Cheung Tat Ming, Vincent Kok, Chin Ka Lok and Jerry Lamb, during the ceremony awards are presented in 17 categories.

== Awards ==
Winners are listed first, highlighted in boldface, and indicated with a double dagger (‡).

**Best Film**: **Beast Cops**‡; The Storm Riders; The Longest Summer; City of Glass; Who Am I?	**Best Director**: **Gordon Chan and Dante Lam — Beast Cops**‡; Stanley Kwan — Hold You Tight; Patrick Yau — The Longest Nite; Mabel Cheung — City of Glass; Fruit Chan — The Longest Summer
**Best Screenplay**: **Chan Hing-ka and Gordon Chan — Beast Cops**‡; Alex Law and Mabel Cheung — City of Glass; Fruit Chan — The Longest Summer; Szeto Kam-Yuen, Yau Nai-hoi and Taures Chow — Expect the Unexpected; Szeto Kam-Yuen and Yau Nai-hoi — The Longest Nite	**Best Actor**: **Anthony Wong — Beast Cops**‡; Sonny Chiba — The Storm Riders; Sean Lau — The Longest Nite; Tony Leung — The Longest Nite; Leon Lai — City of Glass; Jackie Chan — Who Am I?
**Best Actress**: **Sandra Ng — Portland Street Blues**‡; Shu Qi — City of Glass; Chingmy Yau — Hold You Tight; Fiona Leung — A Hero Never Dies; Anita Yuen — Till Death Do Us Part	**Best Supporting Actor**: **Patrick Tam — Beast Cops**‡; Alex Fong — Your Place or Mine!; Eric Tsang — Hold You Tight; Nick Cheung — The Conman; Sam Lee — The Longest Summer
**Best Supporting Actress**: **Shu Qi — Portland Street Blues**‡; Shu Qi — The Storm Riders; Kristy Yang — Portland Street Blues; Stephanie Che — Beast Cops; Amanda Lee — 9413	**Best New Performer**: **Nicholas Tse — Young and Dangerous: The Prequel**‡; Jo Koo — The Longest Summer; Yoyo Mung — Expect the Unexpected; Tony Ho — The Longest Summer; Daniel Wu — City of Glass
**Best Cinematography**: **Arthur Wong — Fuyajo**‡; Kwan Pun Leung — Hold You Tight; Peter Pau — Anna Magdalena; Andrew Lau — The Storm Riders; Jingle Ma — City of Glass	**Best Film Editing**: **Marco Mak and Danny Pang — The Storm Riders**‡; Chan Ki-hop — Beast Cops; Peter Cheung and Yau Chi-Wai — Who Am I?; Chan Chi-wai — The Longest Nite; Chi-Leung Kwong — Hot War
**Best Art Direction**: **Yohei Taneda — Fuyajo**‡; Bruce Yu — Hold You Tight; Bruce Yu — City of Glass; Cyrus Ho — The Storm Riders; David Pun Chi Wai — Anna Magdalena	**Best Costume Make Up Design**: **Lee Pik Kwan — The Storm Riders**‡; Dora Ng — Anna Magdalena; Yohei Taneda — Fuyajo; Bruce Yu — City of Glass; Bruce Yu and Steven Tsang — A Hero Never Dies
**Action Choreography**: **Jackie Chan — Who Am I?**‡; Dion Lam — The Storm Riders; Bruce Law — Extreme Crisis; Stephen Tung — Hitman; Stephen Tung — Hot War	**Best Original Film Score**: **Chan Kwong Wing — The Storm Riders**‡; Dick Lee and Chiu Tsang-Hei — City of Glass; Chiu Tsang-Hei — Anna Magdalena; Yue Yat-Yiu and Keith Leung — Hold You Tight; Lam Wah-Chuen and Kenneth Bi — The Longest Summer
**Best Original Film Song**: **今生不再 — City of Glass''**‡; Composer: Dick Lee; Lyricist: Albert Leung; Singer: Leon Lai; 風雲 — The Storm Riders; Composer: Chan Kwong Wing; Lyricist: Albert Leung; Singer: Ekin Cheng; 驚變 — The Storm Riders; Composer: Alan Tam; Lyricist: Siu Mei; Singer: Aaron Kwok; 你是我的女人 — A True Mob Story; Composer: Kenny G, T.K. Chan & Walter Afanasieff; Lyricist: Andy Lau; Singer: Andy Lau; 去年煙花特別多 — The Longest Summer; Composer: Lam Wah Chuen; Lyricist: Lam Wah Chuen; Singer: Andy Lau	**Best Sound Design**: **The Storm Riders**‡; Who Am I?; Beast Cops; Hot War; City of Glass
**Lifetime Achievement**: **Peng Yen-Lien**‡
