= List of Hong Kong submissions for the Academy Award for Best International Feature Film =

Best International Feature Film submissions from Hong Kong

Highlights
- Debut: 1959
- Submissions: 45
- Nominations: 3
- Oscar winners: none

Hong Kong has submitted films for the Academy Award for Best International Feature Film (Note: The category was previously named the Academy Award for Best Foreign Language Film, but this was changed to the Academy Award for Best International Feature Film in April 2019, after the Academy deemed the word "Foreign" to be outdated.) since 1959. The award is handed out annually by the United States Academy of Motion Picture Arts and Sciences to a feature-length motion picture produced outside the United States that contains primarily non-English dialogue. Hong Kong's submission is decided annually by Hong Kong's Motion Picture Industry Association.

Hong Kong, China, and Taiwan are recognized as separate entities by AMPAS and each one routinely sends a film to the competition. Although one of the hallmarks of Hong Kong Cinema has been its use of the distinctive Cantonese language, only half of Hong Kong's Oscar submissions were shot in Cantonese.

As of 2026, Hong Kong has been nominated three times, for Raise the Red Lantern (1991), Farewell My Concubine (1993), and Better Days (2019). Only the latter was directed by a Hong Kong native.

== Submissions ==
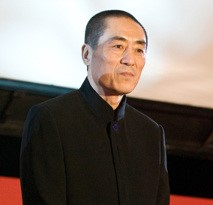
Zhang Yimou directed Hong Kong's first film nominated for the award, Raise the Red Lantern (1991).

Every year, each country is invited by the Academy of Motion Picture Arts and Sciences to submit its best film for the Academy Award for Best International Feature Film. The International Feature Film Committee oversees the process and reviews all the submitted films. Following this, they vote via secret ballot to determine the five nominees for the award.

Johnnie To and Li Han-hsiang have had their films selected three times while Yueh Feng, Wai Ka-fai, King Hu, Ann Hui and Yim Ho have each been selected twice. In both 2002 and 2004, Hong Kong's submissions were rejected by the Academy for not conforming to AMPAS rules.

Hong Kong's submissions have included a large number of films set in mainland China, including several lavish period costume dramas (1966, 1976, 1991, 2000 and 2006), two tales set against the background of the Peking opera scene (1989 and 1993) as well as more intimate stories of rural China (1969, 1979, 1984 and 1994). They have also selected one story about the traditional Cantonese opera scene in Hong Kong (1996), three gritty triad dramas focusing on Hong Kong's criminal underworld (2001, 2003, 2007), two melodramas (1959, 1964), two contemporary family dramas (1995 and 1998), stories focusing on immigration to and from Hong Kong (1990 and 1999), a number of supernatural thrillers (1960, 2002, 2004, 2008), and two big-budget musicals (1963, 2005). In 2009, they chose a historical drama set in neighboring Taiwan for the first time.

Most of the films submitted are primary in Mandarin or Cantonese. Below is a list of the films that have been submitted by Hong Kong for review by the Academy for the award.

Year (Ceremony)	Film title used in nomination	Original title	Languages	Director(s)	Result
1959 (32nd)	For Better, for Worse	雨過天青	Mandarin	Yueh Feng	Not nominated
1960 (33rd)	The Enchanting Shadow	倩女幽魂	Mandarin	Han Hsiang Li	Not nominated
1963 (36th)	The Love Eterne	梁山伯與祝英台	Mandarin	Han Hsiang Li	Not nominated
1964 (37th)	Between Tears and Laughter	新啼笑姻緣	Mandarin	Ho Meng Hua, Yueh Feng, Doe Ching, Luo Zhen, Yen Chun and Hsieh Chun	Not nominated
1966 (39th)	Come Drink with Me	大醉俠	Mandarin	King Hu	Not nominated
1969 (42nd)	The Arch	董夫人	Mandarin	Tang Shu Shuen	Not nominated
1976 (49th)	The Last Tempest	瀛台泣血	Mandarin	Han Hsiang Li	Not nominated
1979 (52nd)	Raining in the Mountain	空山靈雨	Mandarin	King Hu	Not nominated
1984 (57th)	Homecoming	似水流年	Cantonese	Yim Ho	Not nominated
1989 (62nd)	Painted Faces	七小福	Cantonese	Alex Law	Not nominated
1990 (63rd)	Eight Taels of Gold	八兩金	Cantonese	Mabel Cheung	Not nominated
1991 (64th)	Raise the Red Lantern	大紅燈籠高高掛	Mandarin	Zhang Yimou	Nominated
1993 (66th)	Farewell My Concubine	霸王別姬	Mandarin	Chen Kaige	Nominated
1994 (67th)	The Day the Sun Turned Cold	天國逆子	Mandarin	Yim Ho	Not nominated
1995 (68th)	Summer Snow	女人，四十	Cantonese	Ann Hui	Not nominated
1996 (69th)	Hu-Du-Men	虎度門	Cantonese	Shu Kei	Not nominated
1998 (71st)	Made in Hong Kong	香港製造	Cantonese	Fruit Chan	Not nominated
1999 (72nd)	Ordinary Heroes	千言萬語	Cantonese	Ann Hui	Not nominated
2000 (73rd)	In the Mood for Love	花樣年華	Cantonese and Shanghainese	Wong Kar-wai	Not nominated
2001 (74th)	Fulltime Killer	全職殺手	Cantonese, Japanese and English	Wai Ka-Fai and Johnnie To	Not nominated
2002 (75th)	The Touch	天脈傳奇	English and Mandarin	Peter Pau	Disqualified
2003 (76th)	Infernal Affairs	無間道	Cantonese	Andrew Lau and Alan Mak	Not nominated
2004 (77th)	Running on Karma	大隻佬	Cantonese	Wai Ka-Fai and Johnnie To	Disqualified
2005: (78th)	Perhaps Love	如果•愛	Mandarin and Cantonese	Peter Ho-Sun Chan	Not nominated
2006 (79th)	The Banquet	夜宴	Mandarin	Feng Xiaogang	Not nominated
2007 (80th)	Exiled	放逐	Cantonese	Johnnie To	Not nominated
2008 (81st)	Painted Skin	畫皮	Mandarin	Gordon Chan	Not nominated
2009 (82nd)	Prince of Tears	淚王子	Mandarin	Yonfan	Not nominated
2010 (83rd)	Echoes of the Rainbow	歲月神偷	Cantonese	Alex Law	Not nominated
2011 (84th)	A Simple Life	桃姐	Cantonese	Ann Hui	Not nominated
2012 (85th)	Life Without Principle	奪命金	Cantonese	Johnnie To	Not nominated
2013 (86th)	The Grandmaster	一代宗師	Mandarin and Cantonese	Wong Kar-wai	Made shortlist
2014 (87th)	The Golden Era	黄金時代	Mandarin	Ann Hui	Not nominated
2015 (88th)	To the Fore	破風	Mandarin	Dante Lam	Not nominated
2016 (89th)	Port of Call	踏血尋梅	Cantonese	Philip Yung	Not nominated
2017 (90th)	Mad World	一念無明	Cantonese	Wong Chun	Not nominated
2018 (91st)	Operation Red Sea	紅海行動	Mandarin	Dante Lam	Not nominated
2019 (92nd)	The White Storm 2: Drug Lords	掃毒2天地對決	Cantonese	Herman Yau	Not nominated
2020 (93rd)	Better Days	少年的你	Mandarin	Derek Tsang	Nominated
2021 (94th)	Zero to Hero	媽媽的神奇小子	Cantonese	Jimmy Wan	Not nominated
2022 (95th)	Where the Wind Blows	風再起時	Cantonese	Philip Yung	Not nominated
2023 (96th)	A Light Never Goes Out	燈火闌珊	Cantonese	Anastasia Tsang	Disqualified
2024 (97th)	Twilight of the Warriors: Walled In	九龍城寨之圍城	Cantonese	Soi Cheang	Not nominated
2025 (98th)	The Last Dance	破·地獄	Cantonese	Anselm Chan	Not nominated
2026 (99th)	Sons of the Neon Night	風林火山	Cantonese	Juno Mak	Pending

== See also ==
- List of Academy Award winners and nominees for Best International Feature Film
- List of Chinese submissions for the Academy Award for Best International Feature Film
- List of Taiwanese submissions for the Academy Award for Best International Feature Film
- List of Academy Award-winning foreign language films
- Cinema of Hong Kong
