= A Tale of Three Cities =

2015 Chinese-Hong Kong film by Mabel Cheung

- Theatrical release poster
- Traditional Chinese: 三城記
- Simplified Chinese: 三城记
- Directed by: Mabel Cheung
- Written by: Mabel Cheung; Alex Law
- Produced by: Alex Law; Nansun Shi; Zhang Dajun; James Tsim; Shan Tam
- Starring: Sean Lau; Tang Wei; Qin Hailu; Jing Boran
- Cinematography: Wang Yu
- Edited by: Kwong Chi-leung; Wong Hoi
- Music by: Henry Lai
- Release dates: 27 August 2015 (China); 3 September 2015 (Hong Kong)
- Running time: 126 minutes
- Countries: China; Hong Kong
- Language: Mandarin

A Tale of Three Cities (simplified Chinese: 三城记; traditional Chinese: 三城記) is a 2015 war romance film directed by Mabel Cheung. A Chinese-Hong Kong co-production, the film is about the real love story of two people (Charles and Lee-Lee Chan, parents of Jackie Chan) who met in Wuhu during the Second Sino-Japanese War in the 1930s, separated in Shanghai during the Chinese Civil War in the 1940s, and finally reunited in Hong Kong in the 1950s while their children from previous marriages were left behind in mainland China (whom they would not see again until 38 years later).

== Plot ==
In the turbulent 1940s and 1950s, love was hard to come by. An engagement token, a love song, or a promise were enough to make lovers obsessed. Policeman Fang Daolong, with his complex identity, meets the enigmatic Chen Yuerong, and their love story unfolds across three cities. They fell in love in Anhui, separated in Shanghai, but they still kept a promise to each other and waited for reunion in Hong Kong. That night, Daolong waited for the boat carrying Yuerong to dock at the shore of Hong Kong Island, but unexpectedly the boat had an accident. Yuerong finally arrived in Hong Kong smoothly and started a new life with Daolong.

== Cast ==
- Sean Lau as Fang Daolong
- Tang Wei as Chen Yuerong
- Qin Hailu as Sister Qiu
- Jing Boran as Shou Maihua
- Huang Jue as Master Zhou
- Elaine Jin as Yuerong's mother
- Li Jianyi as grandfather
- Jiao Gang
- Philip Chan

== See also ==
- Traces of a Dragon, 2003 documentary film on Jackie Chan's parents, also directed by Cheung
