= Hong Kong Film Directors' Guild =

- Founded: 1989
- Location: Hong Kong
- Key people: President: Derek Yee
- Website: www.hkfdg.com

The Hong Kong Film Directors' Guild (HKFDG; Chinese: 香港電影導演會) is an entertainment guild founded in 1989 to represent the interests of directors in the Hong Kong film industry. At the Hong Kong Film Awards committee member votes contribute a weight of 25% towards the overall score of in the categories Best Director, Best New Director and Best Visual Effects.

== Hong Kong Film Directors' Guild Awards ==
The Hong Kong Film Directors' Guild Awards is an annual Hong Kong film awards ceremony organized by the Guild. It was established in 2006.

== Executive Committee Members ==
Role	Name
Honorary Presidents	Ng See-yuen; Philip Chan; Jackie Chan; Joe Cheung
Honorary Advisors	Willie Chan
President	Derek Yee
Vice-Presidents	Andrew Lau; Kenneth Bi; Wilson Yip; Derek Kwok
Committee Members	Joe Cheung; Mabel Cheung; Manfred Wong; Tung Wai; Manfred Wong; Alex Law; Mabel Cheung; Cheung Chi Sing; Cheung Tung Joe; Poon Yuen Leung; Lai Miu Suet
Members by invitation	John Chiang; Samson Chiu; Kevin Chu; Abe Kwong; Casey Chan; Lo Chi Leung; Barbara Wong; Luk Kim Ming; Bi Kenneth; Yip Wai Shun; Yip Wai Man; Kwok Tsz Kin
