= Charles and Lee-lee Chan =

Parents of Jackie Chan

Charles Chan (18 December 1914 – 26 February 2008) and Lee-lee Chan (1916 – 28 February 2002) were the parents of actor/director/singer Jackie Chan and the grandparents of actor/singer/composer Jaycee Chan. Due to being the father of Jackie Chan, Charles made cameos in some of Chan's films such as Police Story 2 and also starred in his own film once made by a company trying to advertise it as a Jackie Chan film.

Their story was made into a 2013 feature film A Tale of Three Cities directed by Mabel Cheung.

== Charles's biography ==
Charles Chan
- 房道龍
- Pronunciation: Fang Daolong
- Born: 18 December 1914; He County, Anhui, Republic of China
- Died: 26 February 2008 (aged 93); Hong Kong
- Spouse(s): Wan's (19??–1947; her death); Lily Chan (1954–2002; her death)
- Children: Fang Shide, Fang Shisheng, Fang Shilong (Jackie Chan)

=== Nationalist guard ===
According to Charles' father, he still needed discipline when Charles returned to Nanjing at the age of 20. His grandfather was a good friend of Chinese National Revolutionary Army General Ku Chu-tung (Gu Zhutong, Chinese: 顧祝同) and after displaying his martial arts skills, Charles became General Gu's orderly, which was similar to being a personal guard according to Charles. General Gu later became Chief of Staff to General Chiang Kai-shek.

General Gu had many armed guards and Charles was also given a rifle of his own. He lost his job as an orderly when he accidentally pulled the trigger of his automatic rifle, which startled him, causing him to drop it. The rifle continued to fire rounds as it spun on the ground.

Charles returned home and eventually found employment on a Mitsubishi cargo ship in Wuhan.

=== Mitsubishi ===
Of the seven general maintenance workers in his group, he became the leader. This group of seven also openly traded merchandise without official permits. Linen was especially very expensive in Nanjing, so they bought the linen in Wuhu and shipped it to Nanjing. Once the linen was in Nanjing, it was traded for salt. According to Charles, when Japanese workers arrived in Nanjing to seek employment, they felt they were not given any benefits and accused Charles and his group of smuggling and they were arrested by Japanese authorities. Upon the fourth day of their imprisonment, he and his group had their hands tied behind their backs and were taken to witness an execution. What they saw caused them to literally faint, lose their appetites and experience restless sleep. One week later, they were taken again to witness another execution. Charles, while recalling this horrific experience in the film documentary, Traces of a Dragon: Jackie Chan and his Lost Family, said that he and the other six workers in his group, upon witnessing another execution, became like zombies.

=== Second Sino-Japanese War ===
The Second Sino-Japanese War broke out in July 1937. Soon, under the pretext of creating a "Greater East Asia Co-Prosperity Sphere", the Japanese Imperial Army launched an all-out invasion of Southeast Asia, but their primary target was always China.

Through political connections, a relative of Charles pleaded with the Japanese authorities to release him from prison. Of the seven workers, only five came out alive, among them was Charles. Deciding to quit his job on the cargo ship, Charles returned to General Gu, who was Dai Li's boss, to ask for help. This time, General Gu got Charles a job in the Intelligence Bureau of the Administration Office as a Secret Agent of the First War Zone. According to Charles, the Nationalist Government was corrupt and currency became less and less usable as even the price of a stick of fried bread (Youtiao) skyrocketed into extremely unreasonable prices.

Charles then led his entire unit of 38 men to the headquarters in Shanghai where they all intended to formally hand in their resignations. However, being the leader of this unit made him the target of two assassination attempts, one of which occurred on the way to the headquarters in Shanghai. While descending down some stairs, someone shouted that he had too much power and shot him. The bullet went through the upper calf of his leg. Later, someone shot Charles from behind and this time the bullet took off a piece of his scalp near the crown of his head. Charles expressed that he believes it was Communists who tried to kill him as he was a Nationalist.

In the meantime, the Japanese Army were taking the coastal cities of China with overwhelming force causing the Chinese population to continually move further and further inland. Charles fled to Anhui, but it was too devastated from the Japanese air raids for him to stay. Both of his parents and his sister were killed in these air raids. He then fled to Chongqing (Chungking), but returned three or four months later. Living alone among the ruins in Anhui, he met his first wife and they had two sons, Fang Shide (房仕德) and Fang Shisheng (房仕勝). Eventually, they moved to Wuhu.

When the older son, Shide, was seven, and the younger son, Shisheng, was two, Charles' wife was diagnosed with cervical cancer and was bed-ridden for three years while in constant pain. Opium, when it could be smuggled undetected by authorities, was often used as a pain-killer, but Charles did not know how to prepare it and hired someone for this task. This caused him to eventually go bankrupt. His first wife died of her illness in 1947.

As the Communists and Nationalists clashed, the Chinese Civil War broke out and the Communists eventually won. In the meantime, due to Charles having been a former Secret Agent for the Nationalists, his life was in danger and he felt he had no other choice but to leave his two young sons behind and flee Wuhu. Charles left without telling them good-bye or where he was going. He ended up in Shanghai at the age of 29. According to his two sons, when they woke up the next morning, their father was simply gone. Without parents, a policeman found them and the two sons were taken care of secretly by Charles' friends. These friends feared that if they were discovered to be helping the sons of a former Nationalist Secret Agent, they could be arrested by the Communists. Charles expressed that from that day until the day he met them again in 1985, he worried about his sons and wondered if they were still alive.

=== Death ===
Charles Chan died at the age of 93 on 26 February 2008 in Hong Kong. Family members, including his grandson Jaycee Chan, were at his bedside. His son Jackie was unable to be there due to filming commitments, but he was with his father during the Chinese New Year period and said on his website that he knew that might be the last time he saw his father.

Charles Chan was interred next to his wife in the Gungahlin Cemetery in Canberra on 8 March 2008. Jackie Chan, the US ambassador Robert McCallum, and former ACT chief ministers Kate Carnell and Gary Humphries were in attendance.

== Lee-lee's biography ==
Lily Chan
- Born: 1916; Wuhan, Republic of China
- Died: 28 February 2002 (aged 85–86); Canberra, Australia
- Spouse(s): Unknown (19??–1944; his death); Charles Chan (1954–2002; her death)
- Children: Yulan, Guilan, Jackie Chan

=== Early life ===
Lee-lee Chan (陳莉莉; born as 陳月榮 (Chén Yuèróng)), also known as Lily Chan, was born circa 1916. Lee-lee's parents owned a grocery store and her first husband worked as a shoe-maker, then later worked at a railroad station. Her first husband was killed from bombs from air raids in Wuhan and at the age of 28, she was left to single-handedly raise her two daughters, Yulan (who was 12 years old when her father died) and Guilan (four at the time).

Lee-lee left Wuhan for lack of money, went to Shanghai at the age of 29 and at the train station, she told her daughters that she would be back. According to Guilan, she told this lie so that they would not feel sad. Yulan, at 12 years old, had to work in a child labour factory to help her grandmother to care for herself and her sister.

=== Shanghai ===
While in Shanghai, Lee-lee heard that trafficking opium was lucrative, so she took a risk and bought some opium. That day, the port was under inspection and the officer in charge of inspecting every passenger was Charles who found the opium Lee-lee was concealing. He confiscated it and was about to arrest her however, he took pity on her when he noticed the blue flower in her hair. According to the autobiography, I Am Jackie Chan; My Life in Action,

during the war in China, a white flower in one's hair signified that one had lost their parents, a blue flower meant that they lost their children and/or husband. Charles asked Lee-lee about her situation and on hearing it, he let her go, returning the opium back to her.

Lee-lee turned to gambling, successfully. She won so many times, that all over Shanghai, she was known as "Big Sister" and was treated with utmost respect. However, her luck eventually changed and she resorted to pawning all of her jewellery and clothes. Meanwhile, she and Charles had become great friends, and when he found out about her pawning her belongings, he got them all back for her. He also belonged to a street gang called the "Shandong Gang". Lee-lee never gambled again, but her friendship with Charles grew stronger.

By studying English, Lee-Lee found employment as a maid in a foreigner's home and worked extremely hard.

=== Death ===
Lee-lee Chan died on 28 February 2002, in Canberra, Australia, aged around 85, and was buried in the Gungahlin Cemetery.

== Flight from China ==
The People's Republic of China was founded in 1949 by Mao Zedong. Many Nationalists fled to Taiwan or Hong Kong. Charles, to further hide from the Communists, changed his name from Fang Daolong to Chan Zhiping, the surname Chan was much more common and was also Lee-lee's surname, and he joined the exodus to Hong Kong. Lee-lee arrived in Hong Kong a couple of years later in 1951.

A friend of Charles found him employment at the French Consulate in Hong Kong. Charles did not know how to cook at that time, and became an odd job man; doing things from cleaning to gardening. After a while of physical labour with little pay, he asked to be taught how to cook. Charles became a chef at the French Embassy which earned him a higher salary. Charles and Lee Lee had since found each other in Hong Kong and on 7 April 1954, they had a son named, Kong-sang Chan (which means, "born in Hong Kong" Chan), better known as Jackie Chan. The family of three lived in the servants quarters of the French Embassy. Lee-lee had found employment there as a maid. According to countless sources, Jackie was a mischievous child who did not like school. At the age of 7, he was enrolled for the maximum 10 years at the China Drama Academy under the cruel Dickensian head teacher, Master Yu Jim-Yuen where he learned the skills of Chinese Opera such as martial arts, acrobatics, singing and dancing with very little emphasis on academics.

The 1960s were still financially challenging in Hong Kong and when Charles had the opportunity to leave there with Charles Greene, the Marshall of the French Embassy, to become a chef at the US Embassy in Australia, he did not hesitate to take the new position. After he had earned enough money for an airline ticket for Lee-lee, he sent for her which meant that after she joined him Australia and also found employment at the US Embassy as a maid, Jackie was left in the care of Master Yu Jim-Yuen.

After Jackie graduated from the China Drama Academy, Charles bought him an apartment in Hong Kong. According to Charles, it cost him and Lee-lee all of their savings plus tips. When Jackie learned of this, his resentment towards his parents for leaving him behind in Hong Kong disappeared as he realised they were working so hard for their son and his future.

In 1985, through the help of a friend who worked at the Chinese Embassy in Australia, who was also from Shandong, China, Charles found his two sons in China. They were living in Wuhan in Hubei province. Their reunion took place in Guangzhou, China, and the sons cried upon seeing their father again, and they said that they had suffered a lot. The older son, Shide, is a postman, and the younger son, Shisheng, works on a pig farm.

Charles visited his two sons and their families in Anhui as often as he was able to (at 89 years old in 2005) and he re-established his position as the patriarch of the Fang family and provided money to renovate the ancestral hall there. He also updated the genealogy by adding Jackie's real name into the records as 房仕龍 (Fáng Shìlóng or Fong Si Lung). The entire Fang clan has been reconnected.

Jackie, at the time Traces of a Dragon: Jackie Chan and his Lost Family was made, had still not met his half brothers, his father's sons, but he has met his half sisters, Lee-lee's daughters as they would often visit their mother in Australia as did Jackie when his parents used to live there.
