= Expect the Unexpected =

Expect the Unexpected may refer to:

- an album by Mike Jones (rapper)
- Expect the Unexpected (film), a 1998 Hong Kong film directed by Patrick Yau Tak Chi
- A quotation from Oscar Wilde's play An Ideal Husband: "To expect the unexpected shows a thoroughly modern intellect."
