= Hot War =

1998 Hong Kong film by Jingle Ma

- Official poster
- Chinese: 幻影特攻
- Jyutping: Waan6 jing2 dak6 gung1
- Directed by: Jingle Ma
- Written by: Calvin Poon; Law Chi-Leung; Chow Siu-Man
- Produced by: Jackie Chan; Raymond Chow
- Starring: Ekin Cheng; Jordan Chan; Kelly Chen; Terence Yin
- Cinematography: Chan Chi-ying
- Edited by: Kwong Chi-leung
- Music by: Peter Kam
- Production company: Golden Harvest Company
- Distributed by: Golden Harvest Company
- Release date: 24 December 1998
- Running time: 93 minutes
- Country: Hong Kong
- Languages: Cantonese; English
- Box office: HK$9,296,000

Hot War is a 1998 Hong Kong thriller film directed by Jingle Ma, starring Ekin Cheng, Jordan Chan and Kelly Chen.

== Plot ==
A group of CIA scientists, C.S. Koo (Jordan Chan), Tango One (Ekin Cheng) and Blue Szeto (Kelly Chan) are working on a secret project called "VR Fighter" which uses a combination of hypnosis and virtual reality to turn ordinary men into super fighters. A rogue terrorist known as Alien (Terence Yin) wants the hypnosis technology to use for inciting riots to drive up commodity prices, and so he kidnaps Blue. C.S. and Tango decide to use VR Fighter to rescue Blue, but during the mission they learn of the project's consequences that it turns some of the subjects into raving homicidal maniacs. The two friends are set against each other, all while Alien is bringing his plan to fruition.

== Cast ==
- Ekin Cheng as Tango One
- Jordan Chan as C.S. Koo
- Kelly Chen as Blue Szeto
- Terence Yin as Alien
- Asuka Higuchi as Grace
- Ricardo Alexander as Henchman
- Rocky Lai as Alien's Thug
- Dave Taylor as FBI Agent

== Nominations ==
- 18th Hong Kong Film Awards
  - Best Editing - Kwong Chi-Leung
  - Best Action Design - Stephen Tung
  - Best Sound Effects
