= A True Mob Story =

1998 Hong Kong film by Wong Jing

- Film poster

Chinese name
- Traditional Chinese: 龍在江湖
- Simplified Chinese: 龙在江湖
Transcriptions
Standard Mandarin
- Hanyu Pinyin: Lóng Zài Jiāng Hú
Yue: Cantonese
- Jyutping: Lung4 Zoi6 Gong1 Wu4
- Directed by: Wong Jing
- Written by: Wong Jing
- Produced by: Wong Jing
- Starring: Andy Lau; Gigi Leung; Alex Fong; Suki Kwan; Mark Cheng
- Cinematography: Cheng Siu-Keung
- Edited by: Marco Mak
- Music by: Peter Kam; A & D Ltd; C.A.M.
- Production companies: China Star Entertainment; Win's Entertainment; BoB and Partners
- Distributed by: China Star Entertainment
- Release date: 1 July 1998
- Running time: 112 minutes
- Country: Hong Kong
- Language: Cantonese
- Box office: HK$16,931,285

A True Mob Story is a 1998 Hong Kong crime drama film produced, written and directed by Wong Jing and starring Andy Lau and Gigi Leung.

== Plot ==
In 1993, Wai Kat-cheung is an underling of Prince. Since Cheung was young, his father was a triad member so Cheung also joined the triad. One time when Prince owed Crazy Ball a HK$3 million debt, Crazy Ball abducted Prince and Cheung rescues him by slicing Crazy Ball's left eye. Although he later became highly regarded by Prince and his status rose, he also had to pay a heavy price. He not only forged a vendetta with Crazy Ball, that night, his wife Cindy also saw him slaughtering and went to help him but was run over by a car.

Cindy's good friend Ruby, who has had a longtime crush on Cheung, helps Cheung take care of his son Tai-hung. Since Cheung is always referred as a bad guy by Tai-hung's classmates which made Tai-hung have violent tendencies toward his classmates and develops serious eccentric sense.

Five years later, in 1998, Cheung and Prince have a partnership in a factory specializing in the production of unlicensed VCD movie discs, Prince was hiding from Cheung and secretly operate a dirty mass production of cocaine. One time while collecting debts, Cheung crushed a man named Chow Tai-man's head and was sued to court and therefore meets defense attorney Sandy. Sandy's boyfriend, Michael has been monitoring Cheung's factory and suspects Cheung of engaging in drug trafficking activities. When Michael knew Sandy was fighting the case for Cheung, he suggested that Sandy abort Cheung's defense but was refused, and later Sandy successfully helped Cheung win the case.

While Cheung looks over his factory with Prince, he also protects Ruby, who works in an entertainment venue. Prince coveted Ruby for a long time and was hindered by Cheung, Prince resents toward Cheung. Finally one time when Prince tried to get Ruby and got into conflict with Cheung, Cheung was seriously injured. Since then, Cheung and Ruby formally start a relationship

One night when Cheung and Sandy were out in the streets, they were confronted by Crazy Ball who came for revenge. Cheung successfully escapes with Sandy on his motorcycle. Afterward, Cheung asked for help in the gang to cope with Crazy Ball, but they refused to help since they considered it to be Cheung's personal enmity.

Sandy learned from Michael that Cheung might be involved in drug trafficking activities, therefore she goes to ask Cheung. Later Cheung goes to the factory to examine and discovers the truth of the gang's long-term drug trafficking. At this moment, Crazy Ball broke into Cheung's residence and holds Ruby and Tai-hung hostage. On his way to save the two, Cheung was arrested by the police for drug trafficking. Although he was released soon, but that night, Ruby was gang raped and Tai-hung lost his eyesight.

Crazy Ball cannot be reconciled for not finding Cheung and in order to continue to take revenge, he killed Prince, which angers the gang leader, Uncle Mei. Uncle Mei sends many henchmen to kill Crazy Ball. Although he was chased by the gang, he finally died in the hands of Cheung. This was witnessed by David, who was an undercover cop planted by Michael. Cheung was wanted for murder Crazy Ball and goes to Sandy for help. Sandy reveals that she loves him and will not let him go to jail. Sandy suggested Cheung to turn himself in so she can defend him, and let Cheung be the tainted witness of drug trafficking case, which leads Uncle Mei to prison.

Michael always wanted to arrest Cheung, but David, who has been undercover for a year, conscientiously gives a favorable testimony of Cheung. In the most critical moment of the last trial, she commissioned another lawyer to be Cheung's defense lawyer, and she transformed into a new witness. She testifies that Cheung is her boyfriend, and during Crazy Ball's murder, they were in her apartment. Her testimony was accepted by the jury and Cheung was finally acquitted. She also felt guilty lying to herself and felt unworthy for her boyfriend Michael.

Outside the courthouse, Cheung catches up with Sandy to express his gratitude to her, and Sandy said they do not fit together, and claims she only did that just to not let him go to jail and tells him to take good care of Ruby and Tai-hung. As they separate, Cheung was unexpectedly killed by Uncle Mei's henchmen on the streets.

== Cast ==
- Andy Lau as Wai Kat-cheung / Cheung Dee
- Gigi Leung as Sandy Leung
- Alex Fong as Michael
- Suki Kwan as Ruby
- Mark Cheng as Prince
- Sam Lee as Sun Sa
- Ben Ng as Crazy Ball
- Frankie Ng as Gusty Chuen
- Lee Siu-kei as Pau Wing
- Jeffery Yu
- David Lee as David
- Joe Ma as Lion King
- Angie Cheung as Cindy (guest star)
- Michael Chan as Uncle Mei
- Wong Tin-lam as Uncle Fatty
- Dennis Chan as Judge for murder case
- Teddy Chan as Prosecutor in murder case
- Samson Yeung
- Ray Pang as Fat Chow Tai-man
- Chris Chan
- Ben Yuen as Prosecutor in assault case
- Wu Kai-kwong
- Chow Hiu-kwong
- Ng Ka-wai as VCD factory manager
- Lee Chun-sam as Dee's solicitor
- Lee Sheung-kwan
- Chan Po-chun as One of Prince's men
- Tsui Tse-fung
- Leung Wai-ling
- Lu Lei
- Law Shu-kei as Judge for assault case
- Gary Mak as Police officer
- Sam Ho as Triad at VCD factory
- Chow Mei-sing as Crazy Ball's gangster
- So Wai-nam as Crazy Ball's gangster
- Ma Yuk-sing as Killer of Gutsy Chuen in minibus
- Cheang Pou-soi as Uncle Mei's bodyguard
- Sherwing Ming as lawyer's secretary
- Law Wai-kai as Uncle Mei's bodyguard

== Theme songs ==
- "You Are My Woman" (你是我的女人)
  - Composer: Kenny G, TK Chan, Walter Afanasieff
  - Lyricist/Singer: Andy Lau
- "Only a Mouth Left" (死剩把口)
  - Composer: Suen Wai Lun
  - Lyricist/Singer: Andy Lau

== Box office ==
The film grossed HK$16,931,285 at the Hong Kong box office during its theatrical run from 1 July to 31 July 1998 in Hong Kong.

== Award nomination ==
- 18th Hong Kong Film Awards
  - Nominated: Best Original Film Song (Composer: Kenny G, TK Chan, Walter Afanasieff, Lyricicst/Singer: Andy Lau)

== See also ==
- Andy Lau filmography
- Wong Jing filmography
