= Anna Magdalena =

1998 Hong Kong film by Yee Chung-man

- DVD cover
- Directed by: Yee Chung-Man
- Written by: Ivy Ho
- Produced by: Claudie Chung
- Starring: Aaron Kwok; Kelly Chen; Takeshi Kaneshiro
- Cinematography: Peter Pau
- Edited by: Maurice Lee
- Music by: Chiu Tsang-hei
- Production companies: Golden Harvest; United Filmmakers Organization (UFO)
- Distributed by: Golden Harvest
- Release date: 4 April 1998
- Running time: 98 minutes
- Country: Hong Kong
- Language: Cantonese
- Box office: HK$7,805,160

Anna Magdalena (Chinese: 安娜瑪德蓮娜) is a 1998 Hong Kong romantic fantasy comedy film starring Aaron Kwok, Kelly Chen and Takeshi Kaneshiro. It was the directorial debut of production designer Yee Chung-Man.

== Title ==
The title refers to the keyboard piece Minuet in G Major believed to have been written by Johann Sebastian Bach's colleague, Christian Petzold, from the 1725 Notebook for Anna Magdalena Bach. Anna Magdalena was Bach's second wife. The music attracts the attention of Chan Kar-fu and Yau Muk-yan as Mok Man-yee plays it on her piano. The film score uses this theme repeatedly.

== Synopsis ==
The film structure loosely follows that of the minuet: four "movements", which are announced by titles: two themes, a duet, and a set of variations. 1- Chan Kar-fu's (Takeshi Kaneshiro) introduction 2- Yau Muk-yan's (Aaron Kwok) effect on his life 3- Mok Man-Yee's (Kelly Chen) effect on their lives 4- Chan Kar-fu's literary vision of love. This fourth "movement" (Variations) is a wild fantasy on the previous material, based on the novel written by Kaneshiro's character: The XO Pair.

Unemployed aspiring writer Yau Muk-yan (Aaron Kwok) moves into the apartment of Chan Kar-fu (Takeshi Kaneshiro), a shy piano tuner. Both will soon fall in love with their new neighbor Mok Man-Yee (Kelly Chen).

== Cast includes ==
- Aaron Kwok as Yau Muk-yan
- Kelly Chen as Mok Man-Yee
- Takeshi Kaneshiro as Chan Kar-fu
- Jacky Cheung as Policeman (cameo)
- Leslie Cheung as Editor (cameo)
- Anita Yuen as Assistant Editor
- Josie Ho as Cindy, Yau Muk-yan's former girlfriend
- Leo Ku as Client in restaurant (cameo)
- Eric Tsang as Building watchman (cameo)
- Wei Wei as Mrs. Leung
- Yu Wai-Lung as Child X
- Yuki Lai as Child O
- Jojo Hui as Masked woman

== Filming locations ==
- Hong Kong
- Vietnam for the fantasy scenes

== Reception ==
The film grossed HK$7.8 million in Hong Kong.

=== Awards and nominations ===
- 18th Hong Kong Film Awards:
  - Nominated - Best Cinematography (Peter Pau)
  - Nominated - Best Art Direction (Poon Chi-wai)
  - Nominated - Best Costume Design (Ng Lei-lo)
  - Nominated - Best Original Score (Chiu Tsang-hei)
- 1999 Hong Kong Film Critics Society Awards
  - Won: Film of Merit

== See also ==
- Aaron Kwok filmography
- List of Hong Kong films
