= The Longest Summer =

1998 Hong Kong film by Fruit Chan

The Longest Summer 去年煙花特別多
- Film poster
- Directed by: Fruit Chan
- Written by: Fruit Chan
- Produced by: Andy Lau
- Starring: Tony Ho Wah-Chiu; Sam Lee
- Cinematography: Lam Wah Chuen
- Edited by: Fruit Chan
- Music by: Lam Wah Chuen; Kenneth Bi
- Production company: Teamwork Production House Limited
- Distributed by: Edko Films
- Release date: 31 December 1998 (Hong Kong)
- Running time: 128 minutes
- Country: Hong Kong
- Language: Cantonese

The Longest Summer (simplified Chinese: 去年烟花特别多; traditional Chinese: 去年煙花特別多; lit. 'The Flurry of Fireworks Last Year') is Hong Kong independent director Fruit Chan's second feature in his informal "1997 trilogy", first released in 1998. The first film in the trilogy is Made in Hong Kong. The movie details the problems faced by a group of disaffected Hong Kong ex-soldiers of the British Army, just before and after the 1997 handover to the People's Republic of China.

== Plot ==
Ga Yin (Tony Ho Wah-Chiu), a former sergeant in the British Army, is discharged from his post following the imminent handover of Hong Kong to the People's Republic of China in July 1997. He joins his younger brother Ga Suen (Sam Lee) to work for the underworld, as a chauffeur to a Triad leader. Owing to the financial difficulties faced by his former army mates, he decides to mastermind a bank robbery with his brother and his four army pals. But on the day they are robbing the bank, they realize another gang is working on the same plans too.

== Cast ==
- Tony Ho - Ga Yin
- Sam Lee - Ga Suen
- Robby Cheung as officer Cheung, born on 8 September 1965
- Jo Kuk - Jane

== Awards ==
The film received eight nominations at the 18th Annual Hong Kong Film Awards, but won none. These are:

- Nomination - Best Picture
- Nomination - Best Director (Fruit Chan Gor)
- Nomination - Best Supporting Actor (Sam Lee Chan-Sam)
- Nomination - Best Screenplay (Fruit Chan Gor)
- Nomination - Best New Artist (Tony Ho Wah-Chiu)
- Nomination - Best New Artist (Jo Koo)
- Nomination - Best Original Score (Lam Wah-Cheun, Bat Kwok-Chi)
- Nomination - Best Original Song ("Hui Nin Yin Fa Dut Bit Dor", performed by Andy Lau Tak-Wah)

The film is also one of the ten recommended films of the 5th Annual Hong Kong Film Critics Society Awards.

== Controversy ==
=== 48th Hong Kong International Film Festival ===
At 48th Hong Kong International Film Festival, Fruit Chan was announced to be the Filmmaker in Focus for the film festival on 2 February 2024, featuring ten of his previous works. The Longest Summer was removed from the list on 8 March, with the Hong Kong International Film Festival Society stating that it was unable to locate suitable copies for screening, and Chan's 2019 film The Abortionist was presented in its place. However, Ming Pao noted that the Society had previously screened The Longest Summer in 2017 and 2021, while filmmaker Tin Kai-man also expressed confusion over the decision, explaining that copies of all Hong Kong films should be well-preserved in the Hong Kong Film Archive. Chan described the decision as "pitiful", but noted that those interested in watching would find a way to do so on their own.
