= City of Glass (film) =

1998 Hong Kong film by Mabel Cheung

- Film poster
- Directed by: Mabel Cheung
- Written by: Mabel Cheung; Alex Law
- Produced by: Alex Law
- Starring: Leon Lai; Shu Qi; Nicola Cheung; Daniel Wu; Vincent Kok; Pauline Yam; Eason Chan
- Cinematography: Jingle Ma; Arthur Wong
- Edited by: Maurice Li
- Music by: Chiu Tsang-hei; Dick Lee
- Production companies: Golden Harvest Entertainment; Amuse; United Filmmakers Organisation (UFO)
- Distributed by: Golden Harvest
- Release date: 28 October 1998
- Running time: 110 minutes
- Country: Hong Kong
- Language: Cantonese
- Box office: HK$9,875,565

City of Glass (玻璃之城) is a 1998 Hong Kong romance film written and directed by Mabel Cheung and starring Leon Lai, Shu Qi, Nicola Cheung and Daniel Wu.

== Summary ==
On New Year's Day 1997, a car accident in London, England claims the lives of Raphael (Leon Lai) and Vivien (Shu Qi). The couple was once young lovers during their days at the University of Hong Kong in the 1970s, but had drifted apart and eventually ended up marrying other people and raising their own families. However, they reunited in the 1990s and their love partially rekindled. After their funeral, Raphael's son, David (Daniel Wu), and Vivien's daughter, Susie (Nicola Cheung), learned of their parents' affair and embark on a journey to discover their secret lives. In the end, the two fall in love.

== Cast ==
- Leon Lai as Raphael Hui Kong-sun
- Shu Qi as Mrs. Vivien Hung
- Nicola Cheung as Susie Hung
- Daniel Wu as David Hui
- Vincent Kok as Derek
- Pauline Yam as Raphael's wife
- Eason Chan as Hung Ping-ching
- Elaine Jin as Vivien's mom (special appearance)
- Joe Cheung as Raphael's dad (special appearance)
- Henry Fong as Vivien's dad
- Chan Ka-hung as Taxi driver #1
- Jimmy Wong as Taxi driver #2
- Benny Tse as Taxi driver #3
- Wong Sze-yan as Flat buyer
- Hung Yip as Flate buyer's wife
- Tong Man-yee as Tiger Singh
- Laura Clarke as Marliane Griffith
- Richard Hampton as London detective
- Muk Sing as Leader of students' protest in '70s
- Poon Wai-ka as Student of the '70s
- An Mei-tik as Student of the '70s
- Wong Fat as Student of the '70s
- Tam Tik-si as Student of the '70s
- Leung Suk-chin as Student of the '70s
- Mak Nga-ka as Student of the '70s
- Chang Yat-man as Student of the '70s
- Man Wai-ling as Student of the '70s
- Yu Hoi-man as Student of the '70s
- Chan Kit-chi as Student of the '70s
- Ngai Hoi-yin as Student of the '70s
- Poon Man-wai as Student of the '70s
- Yip Tin-pui as Student of the '70s
- Leung Sin-hang as Student of the '70s
- Chan Chun-shing as Student of the '70s
- Leung Kwok-po as Student of the '70s
- Yan Shui-tong as Student of the '70s
- Luk Yuk-wai as Student of the '70s
- Cheung Wing-hang as Student of the '70s
- Cheung Sau-wai as Student of the '70s
- Ng Wai-san as Student of the '70s
- Cheung Hok-ming as Student of the '70s
- Ben Cheung as Student of the '70s
- Szeto Chi-kit as Student of the '70s
- Tang Wing-san as Uncle Henry
- Chow Ka-lai as Veterinarian
- Fong Jing-to as Member of band
- Poon Pau-lok as Member of band
- Leung Kam-biu as Member of band
- Carthy Rosslyn as Warden of Lady Hall
- Chui Wing-suen as Dr. Bernadette Tsui
- Hung Man-ling as Student of the '90s
- Lam Yuk-jan as Student of the '90s
- Lam Siu-bing as Student of the '90s
- Luk Yan as Student of the '90s
- Yeung Lam as Student of the '90s
- Cheung Pui-san as Student of the '90s
- Yeung Yat-man as Student of the '90s
- Lee Pui-ling as Student of the '90s
- Cheung Yuet-fan as Student of the '90s
- Chan Ka-ying as Student of the '90s
- Yiu Koon-tung as Student of the '90s
- Lee Hon-wai as Student of the '90s
- Chan Chui-hung as Student of the '90s
- Wong Yan-wing as Student of the '90s
- Chan Man-ho as Student of the '90s
- Ng Shiu-wa as Student of the '90s
- Lee Hon-ban as Student of the '90s
- Chan Cheuk-wing as Student of the '90s
- Chiu Kin-tong as Student of the '90s
- Yau Wai-hung as Student of the '90s
- Leung Wing-ban as Chinese language teacher
- Paul Cliff as Pilot trainer
- Hogan Ho as Pilot trainer
- Charles Montgomery as Pilot trainer
- Sam Pau-man as Paul
- Paul Harrington as Riot Central Officer
- Craig Leeson as Riot Central Officer
- Verner Bickley as Judge
- David Rosslyn as Professor

== Reception ==
The film was deemed a modest commercial success, grossing HK$9 million in its 1998 Hong Kong theatrical release. Critical commentary perceived the film as a metaphorical comment on the end of British rule in Hong Kong after the handover to Chinese sovereignty in 1997.

== Awards and nominations ==
Awards and nominations
Ceremony	Category	Recipient	Result
18th Hong Kong Film Awards	Best Film	City of Glass	Nominated
18th Hong Kong Film Awards	Best Director	Mabel Cheung	Nominated
18th Hong Kong Film Awards	Best Screenplay	Alex Law, Mabel Cheung	Nominated
18th Hong Kong Film Awards	Best Actor	Leon Lai	Nominated
18th Hong Kong Film Awards	Best Actress	Shu Qi	Nominated
18th Hong Kong Film Awards	Best New Performer	Daniel Wu	Nominated
18th Hong Kong Film Awards	Best Cinematography	Jingle Ma	Nominated
18th Hong Kong Film Awards	Best Art Direction	Bruce Yu	Nominated
18th Hong Kong Film Awards	Best Costume Design	Bruce Yu	Nominated
18th Hong Kong Film Awards	Best Original Film Score	Dick Lee, Chiu Tsang-hei	Nominated
18th Hong Kong Film Awards	Best Original Film Song	Song: No Longer This Life (今生不再) Composer: Dick Lee Lyricist: Lin Xi Singer: Leon Lai	Won
18th Hong Kong Film Awards	Best Sound Design	Golden Harvest Entertainment, Amuse	Nominated
35th Golden Horse Awards	Best Feature Film	City of Glass	Nominated
35th Golden Horse Awards	Best Director	Mabel Cheung	Nominated
35th Golden Horse Awards	Best Actor	Leon Lai	Nominated
35th Golden Horse Awards	Best Original Screenplay	Mabel Cheung, Alex Law	Won
35th Golden Horse Awards	Best Cinematography	Jingle Ma	Won
35th Golden Horse Awards	Best Visual Effects	Centro Digital Pictures Limited	Nominated
35th Golden Horse Awards	Best Art Direction	Bruce Yu	Nominated
35th Golden Horse Awards	Best Film Editing	Maurice Li	Won
35th Golden Horse Awards	Best Sound Design	Kinson Tsang	Won
35th Golden Horse Awards	Best Original Film Score	Dick Lee, Chiu Tsang-hei	Nominated
35th Golden Horse Awards	Best Original Film Song	Song: No Longer This Life (今生不再) Composer: Dick Lee Lyricist: Lin Xi Singer: Leon Lai	Nominated
