= Painted Faces =

1988 Hong Kong film by Alex Law

- US film poster
- Chinese: 七小福
- Literal meaning: Seven Little Fortunes
- Hanyu Pinyin: qī xiǎo fú
- Jyutping: cat1 siu2 fuk1
- Directed by: Alex Law
- Written by: Alex Law; Mabel Cheung
- Produced by: Leonard Ho; Mona Fong
- Starring: Sammo Hung; Lam Ching-ying; Cheng Pei-pei
- Cinematography: David Chung
- Edited by: Kwong Chi-leung; Yu Tun
- Music by: Lowell Lo
- Production companies: Golden Harvest; Shaw Brothers Studio
- Distributed by: Golden Harvest; Celestial Pictures; Fortune Star Media Limited
- Release date: 10 November 1988
- Running time: 100 minutes
- Country: Hong Kong
- Language: Cantonese
- Box office: HK$14,730,964

Painted Faces (Chinese: 七小福) is a 1988 Hong Kong biographical drama film co-written and directed by Alex Law and starring Sammo Hung as his mentor, Master Yu Jim-yuen of the China Drama Academy. For his portrayal as Master Yu, Hung won his second Hong Kong Film Award for Best Actor at the 8th Hong Kong Film Awards. The film was selected as the Hong Kong entry for the Best Foreign Language Film at the 62nd Academy Awards, but was not accepted as a nominee.

The Chinese title refers to the Seven Little Fortunes, which includes Hung, Yuen Biao, Jackie Chan and their fellow opera-mates, who later became popular in the Hong Kong film industry. The film focuses on Master Yu and his methods on bringing up his protégés.

== Cast ==
- Sammo Hung as Master Yu
- Lam Ching-ying as Wah
- Cheng Pei-pei as Ching
- John Shum as Stagehand (guest appearance)
- Wu Ma as Film Director (guest appearance)
- Mary Li as Cheng Lung's mother (guest appearance)
- Chung Kam-yuen as Teenage Samo
  - Yeung Yam-yin as Child Samo
- Cheung Man-lung as Teenage Cheng Lung
  - Siu Ming-fui as Child Cheng Long
- Joseph Koo as Child Yuen Biao
  - Wong Kim-wai as Teenage Yuen Biao

== Reception ==
Marc Savlov of Austin Chronicle gave the film 3½ stars out of 5 and said that: "Despite the fact that the film lags a bit in its second half [...], Painted Faces remains a charming, gorgeously lensed slice of Hong Kong history, and certainly one that no Jackie Chan/Samo Hung/Yuen Biao fan should pass up."

== Accolades ==
Awards and nominations
Ceremony	Category	Recipient	Outcome
8th Hong Kong Film Awards	Best Film	Painted Faces	Nominated
8th Hong Kong Film Awards	Best Director	Alex Law	Nominated
8th Hong Kong Film Awards	Best Actor	Sammo Hung	Won
8th Hong Kong Film Awards	Best Screenplay	Alex Law, Mabel Cheung	Nominated
8th Hong Kong Film Awards	Best Cinematography	David Chung	Won
8th Hong Kong Film Awards	Best Film Editing	Kwong Chi-leung, Yu Tun	Nominated
25th Golden Horse Awards	Best Feature Film	Painted Faces	Won
25th Golden Horse Awards	Best Director	Alex Law	Won
25th Golden Horse Awards	Best Actor	Sammo Hung	Nominated
25th Golden Horse Awards	Best Supporting Actor	Lam Ching-ying	Nominated
25th Golden Horse Awards	Best Original Screenplay	Alex Law, Mabel Cheung	Won
25th Golden Horse Awards	Best Film Editing	Kwong Chi-leung, Yu Tun	Won
25th Golden Horse Awards	Best Original Film Score	Lowell Lo	Won
25th Golden Horse Awards	Best Sound Design	Shaw Brothers Recording Studio, Golden Studios, Tsui Ping-kwong	Won

== See also ==
- List of early sound feature films (1926–1929)
- List of submissions to the 62nd Academy Awards for Best Foreign Language Film
- List of Hong Kong submissions for the Academy Award for Best Foreign Language Film
