= Echoes of the Rainbow =

2010 Hong Kong film by Alex Law

- Film poster

Chinese name
- Traditional Chinese: 歲月神偷
- Simplified Chinese: 岁月神偷
Transcriptions
Standard Mandarin
- Hanyu Pinyin: Suìyuè Shéntōu
Yue: Cantonese
- Jyutping: Seoi3 Jyut6 San4 Tau1
- Directed by: Alex Law Kai-Yui
- Written by: Alex Law Kai-Yui
- Produced by: Mabel Cheung Yuen-Ting
- Starring: Simon Yam; Sandra Ng; Aarif Lee; Evelyn Choi
- Cinematography: Charlie Lam
- Edited by: Eric Kwong; Chan Chi-Wai
- Music by: Henry Lai Wan-man
- Production companies: Big Pictures Ltd. Dadi Film
- Distributed by: Mei Ah Entertainment
- Release dates: 14 February 2010 (Berlinale); 11 March 2010 (Hong Kong)
- Running time: 117 minutes
- Country: Hong Kong
- Language: Cantonese
- Box office: HK$23,111,759

Echoes of the Rainbow (Chinese: 歲月神偷; Jyutping: Seoi3 Jyut6 San4 Tau1; romanisation: Shui Yuet Sun Tau; literally "Time, the Thief") is a 2010 Hong Kong drama film directed by Alex Law and starring Simon Yam and Sandra Ng. It won the Crystal Bear for the Best Film in the Children's Jury "Generation Kplus" category at the 2010 Berlin Film Festival.

It tells the story of a working family in Hong Kong whose eldest son, a popular boy and star athlete, becomes ill with leukemia.

The film is set in 1960s British Hong Kong and was shot on the historic Wing Lee Street in Sheung Wan. It was financed by the Hong Kong government's Film Development Fund.

== Plot ==
The story revolves around the Law family, including parents Mr. and Mrs. Law and their sons, Desmond Law Chun-yat and Law Chun-yi (a.k.a. Big Ears., who is also the film's narrator). They live in a shoe shop on Wing Lee Street, Sheung Wan, in late 1960s Hong Kong. Chun-yi is mischievous, prank-playing and has a poor attitude towards learning, which he often ends up getting scolded for by his parents and teachers. In contrast, his elder brother Desmond is a top grade earner, talented musician, and champion runner who attends the prestigious Diocesan Boys' School. He is profoundly loved by his classmates and teachers. He also has a girlfriend, Flora, who was born to an affluent family. Flora and her family's immigration from Hong Kong to the United States lead Desmond's grades and performance at school to decline. He also gradually becomes aware of the inequalities in Hong Kong society of that time, both through interactions with a cocky British policeman who extorts money from his father in exchange for letting them keep their shop (and who insists that Desmond will never be successful because his English isn't good enough) and through his first time seeing the inside of Flora's family's mansion.

Not long before Flora leaves, Desmond's grades start declining and he takes third place in a race he had hoped to win. One day, after a typhoon nearly destroys the family's house, Desmond collapses and his father takes him to the hospital, where he is diagnosed with leukemia. His parents search for a doctor who can cure him but find none, and his condition worsens until he has to remain in the hospital, where the nurses maltreat him and extort money from his parents in exchange for basic care. Chun-yi, who spends much of his free time stealing trinkets around town, tries to offer them all to his brother in an attempt to cheer him up, but Desmond doesn't accept any of them. Flora returns from the United States and visits him in the hospital, where they share their first kiss, but Desmond dies shortly thereafter.

Years later Chun-yi, narrating retrospectively, remarks that "time is the greatest thief". In the film's final scene, Chun-yi and his mother are shown visiting Desmond's grave, and Chun-yi, now a teenager, recounts a lesson Desmond had taught him about double rainbows.

== Cast ==
- Simon Yam as Mr. Law
- Sandra Ng as Mrs. Law
- Aarif Lee as Desmond Law (aka Law Chun-yat). Lee also portrayed Chun-yi as a teenager in the epilogue
- Buzz Chung as Law Chun-yi
- Evelyn Choi as Flora Lau (aka Lau Fong-fei)
- Paul Chun as Big Uncle/barber
- Lawrence Ah Mon as Goldfish Seller
- Jean-Michel Sourd as French teacher

== Reception ==
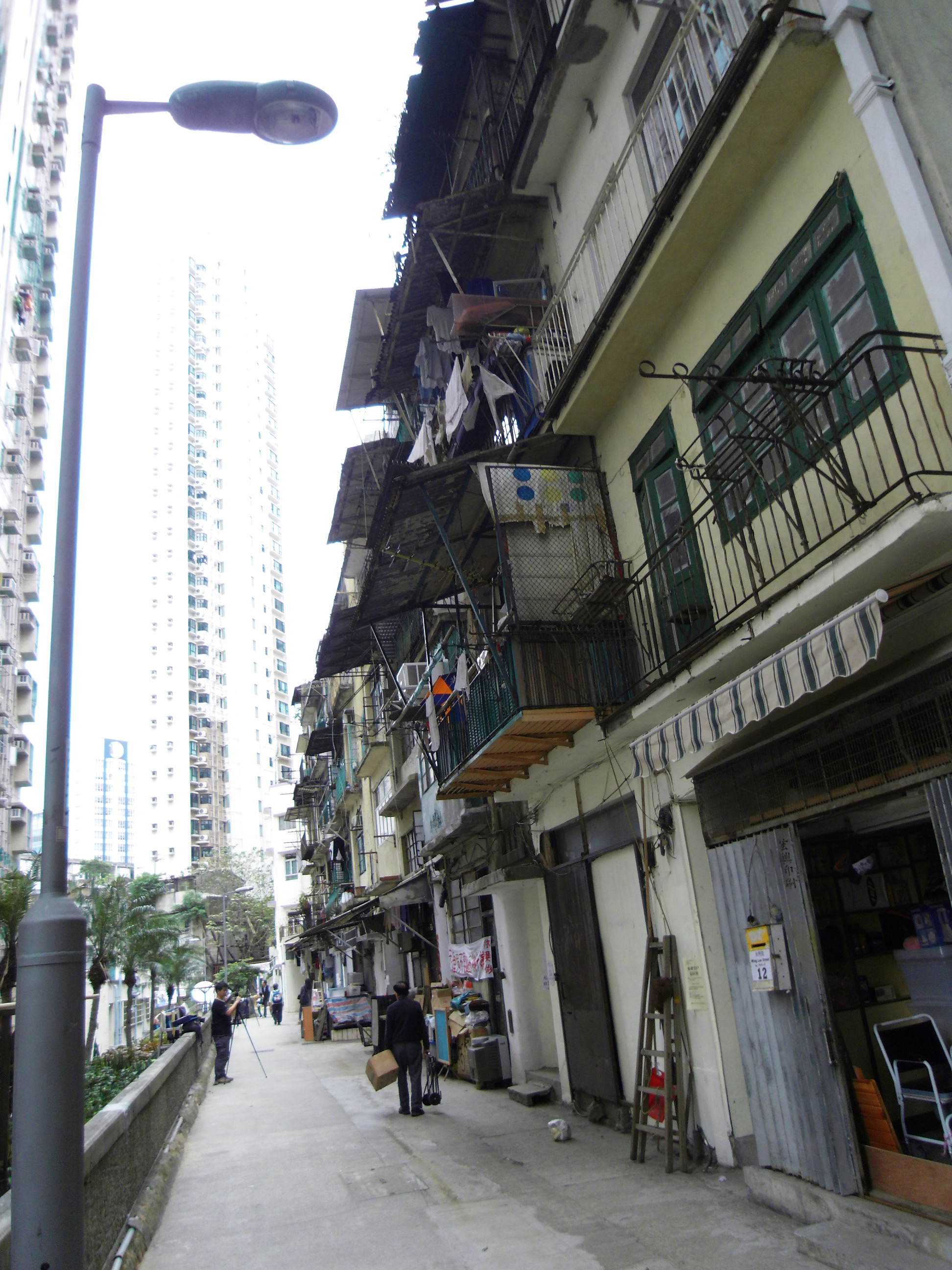
Wing Lee Street, where filming took place

China Daily placed the film on their list of the best ten Chinese films of 2010.

Wing Lee Street, where Echoes of the Rainbow was shot, was originally included in a redevelopment plan. However, the Berlinale award won by the film stimulated the wish of Hong Kong people to preserve this heritage site and community. The Town Planning Board eventually decided to keep all the tong laus on the street and to designate the region as a preservation site.

== Awards and nominations ==
- 29th Hong Kong Film Awards
  - Won: Best Screenplay (Alex Law)
  - Won: Best Actor (Simon Yam)
  - Nominated: Best Actress (Sandra Ng)
  - Won: Best New Performer (Aarif Lee)
  - Nominated: Best New Performer (Chung Shiu To)
  - Won: Best Original Film Song (Lowell Lo, Alex Law and Aarif Lee)
- 60th Berlin International Film Festival
  - Crystal Bear for the Best Film in the Children's Jury "Generation Kplus"

== See also ==
- List of submissions to the 83rd Academy Awards for Best Foreign Language Film
- List of Hong Kong submissions for the Academy Award for Best Foreign Language Film
