= Patrick Yau =

Hong Kong film director

- Born: November 13, 1964 (age 60)
- Occupation(s): film director, and assistant director

Chinese name
- Traditional Chinese: 游達志
- Simplified Chinese: 游达志
Transcriptions
Standard Mandarin
- Hanyu Pinyin: Yóu2 Da2 Zhi4
Yue: Cantonese
- Jyutping: Yau4 Daat6 Ji3

Patrick Yau Tat-Chi is a Hong Kong film director and assistant director best known for making independent films for Milkyway Image, the production company owned by Johnnie To and Wai Ka-Fai.

== Career ==
Yau joined TVB when he was 21 and became Johnnie To's assistant director two years later. He became a television producer for TVB in 1991, but left in 1994 to work for To, as an associate director for his fire-fighting film Lifeline. In 1997, Yau made his directorial debut with his first film, The Odd One Dies and continued to direct films produced by Milkyway Image, such as The Longest Nite and Expect the Unexpected. Yau has now returned to his roots, directing television serials for TVB.

== Filmography ==
Year	Film	Chinese title	Role	Notes
1988	Set Me Free!	我要逃亡	Assistant director	
1989	The Iron Butterfly	特警90	Assistant director	
1990	The Iron Butterfly II	特警90 II 之亡命天涯	Actor	
1997	The Odd One Dies	兩個只能活一個	Director	
1997	Lifeline	十萬火急	Assistant director	
1998	The Longest Nite	暗花	Director; Actor: Police Officer	
1998	Expect the Unexpected	非常突然	Director	
1999	Where a Good Man Goes	再見阿郎	Assistant director	
2001	The Loser's Club	廢柴同盟	Director	Also known as The Losers' Club
2008	Kung Fu Chef	功夫廚神	Director	
2012	3xTrouble	行x踏錯	Director	

== Awards and nominations ==
Hong Kong Film Awards
Year	Film	Result	Category
1999	The Longest Nite	Nominated	Best Director
