= An Autumn's Tale =

1987 Hong Kong film by Mabel Cheung

- Film poster

Chinese name
- Traditional Chinese: 秋天的童話
- Simplified Chinese: 秋天的童话
Transcriptions
Standard Mandarin
- Hanyu Pinyin: Qiū Tiān Dí Tóng Huà
Yue: Cantonese
- Jyutping: Cau1 Tin1 Dik1 Tung4 Waa2
- Directed by: Mabel Cheung
- Written by: Alex Law
- Produced by: Dickson Poon; John Shum
- Starring: Chow Yun-fat; Cherie Chung; Danny Chan
- Cinematography: David Chung; James Hayman
- Edited by: Lee Yim-hoi; Cheung Kwok-kuen; Chu San-kit; Chan Kei-hop; Kwong Chi-leung
- Music by: Lowell Lo
- Distributed by: D&B Films
- Release date: 16 July 1987
- Running time: 98 minutes
- Country: Hong Kong
- Languages: Cantonese; English; Japanese
- Box office: HK$25,546,552

An Autumn's Tale is a 1987 Hong Kong romantic drama film set in New York City starring Chow Yun-fat, Cherie Chung, and Danny Chan. The film is the second entry in Mabel Cheung's "migration trilogy."

The film won the Hong Kong Film Award for Best Film, Best Cinematography (James Hayman and David Chung) and Best Screenplay (Alex Law); Chow was nominated for Best Actor for three films that same year, but won for his performance in City on Fire. On the other hand, Chow won his second Golden Horse Award for Best Actor for his role in this film in 1987. Cherie Chung was nominated for Best Actress and Lowell Lo was nominated for Best Original Score, respectively. The film was ranked #49 on the Hong Kong Film Awards' Best 100 Chinese Motion Pictures.

== Plot ==
Jennifer Lee travels from Hong Kong to New York City with plans to study with her boyfriend, Vincent. Samuel Pang is a relative of Jennifer who arrives at the airport with two friends, Cow and Bull, to pick her up. Pang takes Jennifer to her apartment, and lets Jennifer know that she may stamp on the floor if she needs anything, as he lives downstairs.

The next day, Jennifer wakes Pang up to have him show her how to take a train to meet Vincent. In the train station Jennifer sees Vincent with a girl named Peggy. Infuriated, Jennifer walks back to the car and throws the box of dolls onto the street. Pang's car runs over the dolls as they depart.

Later that night, Pang answers a call from Vincent. He tells Jennifer to meet with him for lunch at Silver Palace restaurant the next day. Pang works as a busboy at the restaurant and overhears their conversation. Jennifer means to study in New York to be with Vincent, but he tells Jennifer to explore the city and meet new people rather than follow him everywhere. She finds out he is leaving for Boston tomorrow.

Depressed, Jennifer goes home and makes a pot of tea. Pang smells gas from upstairs and investigates; he finds a passed-out Jennifer. He takes her downstairs and has someone call the fire department. Seeing Jennifer lovesick for Vincent, Pang takes her out for a walk.

The next day Jennifer goes to a restaurant in Chinatown. Pang walks in and sees her, but Jennifer ignores him and turns aside. Pang is about to sit with Jennifer, only to have a friend from another table call him. Pang greets them and moves toward Jennifer's table. He tries a piece of Jennifer's egg sandwich and calls a staff member over to order extra plates of food for both of them. Pang helps Jennifer build a bookcase and decorate her room. She tells him she found a part-time job as a babysitter to pay for her rent, but would need a second job for her tuition and other expenses. He finds her grandfather's watch, but the strap is worn. Pang goes to buy tickets for a Broadway show, not knowing Jennifer is busy. He tries to sell the tickets.

Jennifer alights a NJ Transit bus to help Pang, who is being questioned by an NYPD officer outside the theatre, but ends up running late for her babysitting job. Pang insists on driving her. They arrive at the home of the child Chung has been hired to babysit, but Jennifer is too anxious to enter. She asks Pang to accompany her.

Tony, one of Mrs. Sherwood's boyfriends, wants to hire Jennifer as a waitress for his restaurant. Pang is suspicious of the owner. Jennifer says he can visit her there. Pang declines, with work on his mind. He later visits Jennifer and is led to an expensive restaurant called "The Big Panda". Unable to read the English menu, he has the waiter order a simple meal for him. The waiter suggests a high-priced array of dishes, which Pang reluctantly agrees to.

While babysitting Anna, Tony visits Jennifer and walks with her into the garden. Mrs. Sherwood recently came home and sees Tony flirting with Jennifer, and calls for her to leave immediately. Having heard about Jennifer losing her babysitting job, Pang and his friends go to The Big Panda restaurant and beat up the owner.

They spend their morning trying to sell her dolls for money. Walking past a vendor, Jennifer sees a watchband she likes; unfortunately, it is out of her budget ($800). At the park, she sees Vincent with Peggy but wants to flee. She asks Pang if she looks better than Peggy. Pang explains that he doesn't care how others looked, nor how others looked at him, as long as he kept his dignity. He told Jennifer that it was his dream to open a restaurant on a pier on the beach, and name it Sampan.

The next morning, Pang writes on his bedroom mirror three commandments and five goals; one goal being "If you want it, go for it", in this case Pang going for "cha bo", Jennifer.

Pang is holding a party, and invites Jennifer, but does not tell her it is his birthday. Vincent heard she was at a party, so he talked with Jennifer the entire night. The conversation became awkward when he mentioned he broke up with Peggy. Pang, serving guests leaves because he does not think he will have a chance with Jennifer. He went drinking and gambling until Bull asks for more money to pay off the gangs. Frustrated, Pang gathered a group of friends to drive in search of the gang and beat them up.

Jennifer wanders into Pang's room and sees a mirror with his handwriting on it. He wrote his name, age, and birthday in English. Feeling lonely, she walks across a park and sees Anna at her school. Mrs. Sherwood greets Jennifer and acknowledges that it was Tony who flirted with her. She invites Jenny to move in with the family on Long Island.

Pang comes back to his apartment the next morning and finds Jennifer's graduation certificate. To congratulate her, he buys the watchband as a gift. The old man did not accept his offer, so Pang sold his car for the watchband. Excited to see Jennifer with the gift, he runs to her apartment only to see Vincent helping Jennifer move furniture in his car. She gives him her address. They exchange gifts and Pang assumes she has gotten back together with Vincent. After hesitation Pang runs after her after she leaves. Unable to catch up as the car turns up the highway ramp, he walks to a beach. He opens his gift and finds her grandfather's watch. Soon Jennifer opens her gift and realizes it is the watch band she had wanted and cries.

Some time afterwards, Jenny is walking with Anna at the same beach she had visited with Samuel. To Jennifer's surprise, they come across a restaurant on the pier called Sampan. Jennifer walks up to the restaurant and approaches Samuel. After calming himself down, Pang asks her, "Table for two?"

== Cast ==
Main Cast:

- Chow Yun-fat as Samuel Pang aka "Sampan" (Note: In the Cantonese version he nicknamed himself 船頭尺; 'Plimsoll line' (Ford used "boathead" as the transliteration). But 船頭尺 actually a Xiehouyu (or a double entendre): Plimsoll line is used for "度水" (measuring water), but "度水" also means "borrow money" in Cantonese. This context of the nickname was explained by Pang 's friend in the film (in Cantonese version); In Mandarin version he use 船頭舵; 'Rudder'. In one scene it was revealed that his real name is Samuel Pang, while the nickname 船頭尺 was written on a certificate. In the ending, he named his restaurant as "Sampan" and it was also used in the English subtitle and secondary source as the alias of the character.)
- Cherie Chung as Jennifer Lee
- Danny Chan as Vincent, Jennifer's boyfriend

Secondary Cast:

- Cindy Ou (also transliterated as Wu Fu-sheng (Note: Known in Chinese as Chinese: 吳福星; pinyin: Wú Fúxīng; Jyutping: ng4 fuk1 sing1; Cantonese Yale: ngh fūk sīng. Credited bilingually as Cindy Ou / 吳福星 in this film and "吳福星" only in the previous film of the director Illegal Immigrant)) as Peggy, Vincent's other girlfriend
- Arthur Fulbright (also transliterated as Ching Yungcho (Note: Known in Chinese as Chinese: 荊永卓; pinyin: Jīng Yǒngzhuō; Jyutping: ging1 wing5 coek3; Cantonese Yale: gīng wíhng cheuk Credited bilingually as Arthur Fulbright /荊永卓 in this film and "荊永卓" only in the previous film of the director Illegal Immigrant)) as Samuel Pang's friend
- Gigi Wong as Mrs. Sherwood
- Chan Yui-yin
- Joyce Houseknecht as Anna Sherwood, daughter of Mrs. Sherwood
- Wong Man as Jennifer's mother (cameo)
- Brenda Lo as May Chu, Jennifer's friend (cameo)
- Tom Hsiung
- Tai Leung as Chinatown restaurant staff

== Filming locations ==
- Williamsburg Bridge - bridge where Pang and Lee drive over as well as passing shots during film
- Brooklyn Bridge - bridge where Pang runs to chase after car with Jennifer and Vincent
- Manhattan Bridge - night view from archways at Adam Street and Monroe Street
- John V. Lindsay East River Park and/or Brooklyn Bridge Park - park scenes involving Pang, Lee
- Hoboken Terminal - train station Vincent arrives with Peggy
- New York Public Library Main Branch - location where Pang and Lee sell the hand made dolls
- Newark Airport - pickup area where Pang parks his car
- New York City Chinatown - various restaurant scenes (inside and out)
- Lower East Side (73 Monroe St) - location of Samuel Pang's home
- Greenwich Street - where Big Panda was located and scenes facing then World Trade Centre
- Metropolitan Opera House - passing shot
- Ocean Grove Pier, New Jersey - SAMPAN restaurant.
- East River Promenade, New York - Flower for Jennifer by old man.

== Box office ==
The film grossed HK$25,546,552 at the Hong Kong box office during its theatrical run from 16 July to 25 August 1987.

== Awards and nominations ==
Awards and nominations
| Ceremony | Category | Recipient | Outcome |
|---|---|---|---|
| 7th Hong Kong Film Awards | Best Film | An Autumn's Tale | Won |
| 7th Hong Kong Film Awards | Best Director | Mabel Cheung | Nominated |
| 7th Hong Kong Film Awards | Best Screenplay | Alex Law | Won |
| 7th Hong Kong Film Awards | Best Actor | Chow Yun-fat | Nominated |
| 7th Hong Kong Film Awards | Best Actress | Cherie Chung | Nominated |
| 7th Hong Kong Film Awards | Best Cinematography | James Hayman, David Chung | Won |
| 7th Hong Kong Film Awards | Best Original Film Score | Lowell Lo | Nominated |
| 24th Golden Horse Awards | Best Feature Film | An Autumn's Tale | Nominated |
| 24th Golden Horse Awards | Best Director | Mabel Cheung | Nominated |
| 24th Golden Horse Awards | Best Actor | Chow Yun-fat | Won |
| 24th Golden Horse Awards | Best Actress | Cherie Chung | Nominated |
| 24th Golden Horse Awards | Best Original Screenplay | Alex Law | Nominated |
| 24th Golden Horse Awards | Best Cinematography | David Chung | Nominated |
| 24th Hong Kong Film Awards | Best 100 Chinese Motion Pictures | An Autumn's Tale (#49) | Won |

== Literature ==
- Ford, Stacilee (2008). Mabel Cheung Yuen-Ting's An Autumn's Tale. Hong Kong University Press. ISBN 9789622098947.
