= Eight Taels of Gold =

1989 Hong Kong film by Mabel Cheung

- Film poster
- Traditional Chinese: 八兩金
- Simplified Chinese: 八两金
- Literal meaning: eight taels of gold
- Hanyu Pinyin: bā liǎng jīn
- Jyutping: baat3 liang2 gam1
- Directed by: Mabel Cheung
- Written by: Mabel Cheung; Alex Law
- Produced by: John Shum
- Starring: Sammo Hung; Sylvia Chang
- Cinematography: Bill Wong
- Edited by: Eric Kwong; Yu Shun
- Music by: Richard Lo; Lo Ta-yu; Li Kwong-Tim
- Production company: Maverick Films
- Distributed by: Golden Harvest
- Release date: December 21, 1989 (Hong Kong)
- Running time: 100 minutes
- Country: Hong Kong
- Language: Cantonese

Eight Taels of Gold (Chinese: 八兩金) is a 1989 Hong Kong drama film directed by Mabel Cheung. The film was selected as the Hong Kong entry for the Best Foreign Language Film at the 63rd Academy Awards, but was not accepted as a nominee.

== Cast ==
- Sammo Hung as 'Slim' Cheng
- Sylvia Chang as Odds and Ends

== See also ==
- List of submissions to the 63rd Academy Awards for Best Foreign Language Film
- List of Hong Kong submissions for the Academy Award for Best Foreign Language Film
