= Beast Cops =

1998 Hong Kong film by Gordon Chan and Dante Lam

- Film poster
- Directed by: Gordon Chan; Dante Lam
- Written by: Gordon Chan; Chan Hing-ka
- Produced by: Gordon Chan; John Chong
- Starring: Michael Wong; Anthony Wong; Roy Cheung; Kathy Chow
- Cinematography: Tony Cheung
- Edited by: Chan Ki-hop
- Music by: Teddy Robin Kwan; Tommy Wai
- Production companies: Media Asia Films; People's Production Limited
- Distributed by: Media Asia Distribution
- Release date: 9 April 1998
- Running time: 110 minutes
- Country: Hong Kong
- Language: Cantonese
- Box office: HK$8,317,750

Beast Cops (Chinese: 野獸刑警) is a 1998 Hong Kong action film directed by Gordon Chan and Dante Lam, produced by Chan and John Chong, and written by Chan and Chan Hing-ka. The film stars Michael Wong and Anthony Wong. The film was released on 9 April 1998.

== Plot ==
Tung (Anthony Wong) is a street cop in Hong Kong who is friends with a triad dai lo named Fai (Roy Cheung). Fai hires a hitman to murder a business rival; the hit goes wrong and Fai, implicated in the incident, goes on the run. This leaves Tung in the put upon position to look after Fai's affairs.

Soon, however, Tung's squad is assigned a new Commanding Officer in the form of Lieutenant Michael Cheung (Michael Wong), a no-nonsense, tough cop who was transferred for having punched out his own previous Commanding Officer. In an attempt to keep tabs on Cheung and similarly introduce him to their precinct Tung takes Cheung to the disco owned by Fai. There, Cheung meets a madam named Yoyo (whose name in dubbed version is sometimes given as Yo-Yo Ma), who is also Fai's moll. Angry and upset that Fai left on such short notice without her, Yoyo accepts Cheung's overture and the two soon find themselves genuinely in love.

In the meantime Fai's eager underling, Push-pin, moves himself into Fai's role and attempts to force Yoyo to peddle customers drugs through her escorts. Yoyo refuses, an action which results in Push-Pin slapping her across the face. Cheung finds out and takes revenge by inspecting Push-Pin's establishments every night.

As Cheung and Yoyo's relationship turns serious, Tung finds his own relationship with a married woman turning sour. She routinely asks him for money [note: seems she is paying him for sex], which leaves him constantly broke. When Push-pin realises slapping Yoyo has resulted in Cheung becoming an enemy, Push-pin hands Tung a handful of money, "as a gift." Actually, this act is a bribe, and when Cheung is later attacked by a group of Push-pin's men and Tung, having made the connection, attempts to bring Push-pin in, Push-pin reminds Tung of the money he had given him. Tung finds himself powerless to arrest Push-pin without exposing himself as having been bribed.

Things come to a head when Fai returns to town and learns that Yoyo is seeing Cheung. Fai goes after Cheung; their fight leads to a standoff with Tung between them, and Yoyo proclaiming she and Cheung are in love and are having a baby. Fai storms off, followed by Tung. The two decide it is time to pay a visit to Push-pin, who has now been officially promoted by the area's lead triad boss, Tai, into Fai's place as dai lo.

While Tung waits outside the disco, Fai goes in to confront Push-pin. After an emotional confrontation, Push-pin chops Fai in the neck with a machete, killing him. Tung sees Push-pin leaving the club; when he runs inside to see what happened, the sight of Fai's body on the floor leaves him devastated and wanting revenge.

Tung, loaded with alcohol and barbiturates, cruises town to find Push-pin. He receives word Push-pin is back at his underground casino and goes there to bring Push-pin down once and for all. This results in Tung taking on not only Push-pin, but all his underlings as well. Cheung shows up with his officers to help, only to find Tung moments later seemingly dead from a steel spike Push-pin has rammed into Tung's gut. Seconds later, Push-pin is killed by one of Fai's men as revenge for his killing of Fai.

As it turns out, Tung survives and he and Cheung pay a visit to the lead triad boss, Tai, where the two promise to eventually bring him down.

== Cast ==
- Michael Wong as Michael Cheung
- Anthony Wong as Tung
- Roy Cheung as Brother Fai
- Kathy Chow as Yoyo
- Sam Lee as Sam
- Patrick Tam as Push-pin
- Stephanie Che as Yee
- Arthur Wong as Tai Ge
- Daisy Woo as Judy Foster
- Sammuel Leung as Paul
- Kong Kim as Kai
- Chan Wing-fai as Policeman
- Che Kim-fai
- Gary Mak as Policeman

== Awards and nominations ==
Awards and nominations
Ceremony	Category	Recipient	Outcome
18th Hong Kong Film Awards	Best Film	Beast Cops	Won
18th Hong Kong Film Awards	Best Director	Gordon Chan, Dante Lam	Won
18th Hong Kong Film Awards	Best Screenplay	Gordon Chan, Chan Hing-ka	Won
18th Hong Kong Film Awards	Best Actor	Anthony Wong	Won
18th Hong Kong Film Awards	Best Supporting Actor	Patrick Tam	Won
18th Hong Kong Film Awards	Best Supporting Actress	Stephanie Che	Nominated
18th Hong Kong Film Awards	Best Editing	Chan ki-hop	Nominated
18th Hong Kong Film Awards	Best Sound Design	Media Asia Films	Nominated
4th Golden Bauhinia Awards	Best Film	Beast Cops	Won
4th Golden Bauhinia Awards	Best Director	Gordon Chan, Dante Lam	Won
4th Golden Bauhinia Awards	Best Actor	Anthony Wong	Won
4th Golden Bauhinia Awards	Best Supporting Actor	Patrick Tam	Won
5th Hong Kong Film Critics Society Award	Best Film	Beast Cops	Won
5th Hong Kong Film Critics Society Award	Best Actor	Anthony Wong	Won

== Home media ==
On 27 December 2001, DVD was released by Hong Kong Legends in the United Kingdom in Region 2.

== See also ==
- List of Hong Kong films
