= The Longest Nite =

1997 Hong Kong film by Patrick Yau and Johnnie To

- Film poster
- Directed by: Patrick Yau; Johnnie To
- Written by: Szeto Kam-Yuen; Yau Nai-hoi
- Produced by: Johnnie To; Wai Ka-fai
- Starring: Sean Lau; Tony Leung
- Cinematography: Ko Chiu-lam; Cheng Siu-keung
- Edited by: Chan Chi-wai
- Music by: Raymond Wong
- Production companies: Film City; Milkyway Image
- Release date: 1 January 1998 (Hong Kong)
- Running time: 84 minutes
- Country: Hong Kong
- Language: Cantonese
- Box office: HK$9,562,090

The Longest Nite (Chinese: 暗花, Literal Title: Dark Flowers) is a 1998 Hong Kong crime thriller film directed by Patrick Yau and Johnnie To, starring Sean Lau and Tony Leung Chiu-wai. The film was produced by To and Wai Ka-fai along with their production company, Milkyway Image.

== Plot ==
Caught in the middle of a fierce gang war in Macao, a corrupt cop named Sam (Tony Leung Chiu-wai) handles negotiations between two Triad leaders who plan to join forces. He meets a suspicious bald man named Tony (Sean Lau), who keeps following him around and disrupting his personal business. But when Sam finds out he's a suspect in a nightclub owner's murder, he is sure his stalker has something to do with it.

== Cast ==
- Sean Lau as Tony
- Tony Leung Chiu-wai as Sam
- Maggie Shiu as Maggie
- Lo Hoi-pang as Mr. Lo
- Lung Fong as Mr Lung
- Wong Tin-lam as Uncle Fat
- Mark Cheng as Mark, Mr. K's son
- Fong Kong as Mr. K
- Lam Suet as Fat's assistant

== Production ==
Wai Ka-fai rewrote most of the script of The Longest Nite with Johnnie To. To and Wai had the film take place in Macau based on the chaos the area was experiencing at the time of filming. Wai Ka-fai has stated that most of The Longest Nite was directed by To. To took over directing the film after Patrick Yau had shot five scenes with Wai Ka-fai rewriting the script as they were shooting. Large portions of the film were shot in Macau.

The Hong Kong title of the film translates to Dark Flowers, a slang for an underworld contract.

== Release ==
The Longest Nite was released in Hong Kong on 1 January 1998. The film grossed a total of HK$9,562,090 on its release. The Longest Nite was not a box office success in Hong Kong, which led to Milkyway Image developing more commercial films such as Needing You... (2000).

== Reception ==
In Variety, Derek Elley referred to the film as "at the very least an attention-grabbing movie that puts a new spin on Hong Kong crimers" and "the movie has something of the risk-taking spirit that first drove the H.K. New Wave almost 20 years ago."

=== Awards and nominations ===
Awards
Ceremony	Category	Name	Outcome
18th Hong Kong Film Awards
18th Hong Kong Film Awards	Best Director	Patrick Yau	Nominated
18th Hong Kong Film Awards	Best Screenplay	Szeto Kam-Yuen, Yau Nai-hoi	Nominated
18th Hong Kong Film Awards	Best Actor	Sean Lau	Nominated
18th Hong Kong Film Awards	Best Actor	Tony Leung	Nominated
18th Hong Kong Film Awards	Best Film Editing	Chan Chi-wai	Nominated
5th Hong Kong Film Critics Society Awards
5th Hong Kong Film Critics Society Awards	Film of Merit		Won

== See also ==
- List of films set in Macau

== Notes ==
=== References ===
- Teo, Stephen (2007). Director in Action: Johnnie To and the Hong Kong Action Film. Hong Kong University Press. ISBN 978-9622098404.
