= Expect the Unexpected (film) =

1998 Hong Kong film by Patrick Yau

- DVD cover
- Directed by: Patrick Yau
- Written by: Sze-to Kam-yuen; Yau Nai-hoi; Taurus Chow
- Produced by: Johnnie To; Wai Ka-fai
- Starring: Lau Ching-wan; Simon Yam; Ruby Wong; Hui Shiu-hung
- Cinematography: Ko Chiu-lam
- Edited by: Chan Chi-Wai
- Music by: Cacine Wong
- Production companies: Film City (Hong Kong); Milkyway Image
- Release date: 28 May 1998 (Hong Kong)
- Running time: 87 minutes
- Country: Hong Kong
- Language: Cantonese
- Box office: HK$5,359,800

Expect the Unexpected (Chinese: 非常突然) is a 1998 Hong Kong action film directed by Patrick Yau and starring Lau Ching-wan and Simon Yam.

== Cast and roles ==
- Simon Yam as Ken
- Lau Ching-wan as Sam
- Yoyo Mung as Mandy
- Ruby Wong as Macy
- Lam Suet as Collins
- Lester Chan as Head of Security Carrier Robbers
- Joe Cheng as Heavy-armed Robber in Apartment
- Hui Shiu-hung as Ben
- Park Ka-sin as Isabella
- Keiji Sato as Jewelry Shop Robber
- Raymond Wong Ho-yin as Jimmy
