= Mabel Cheung =

Hong Kong director (born 1950)

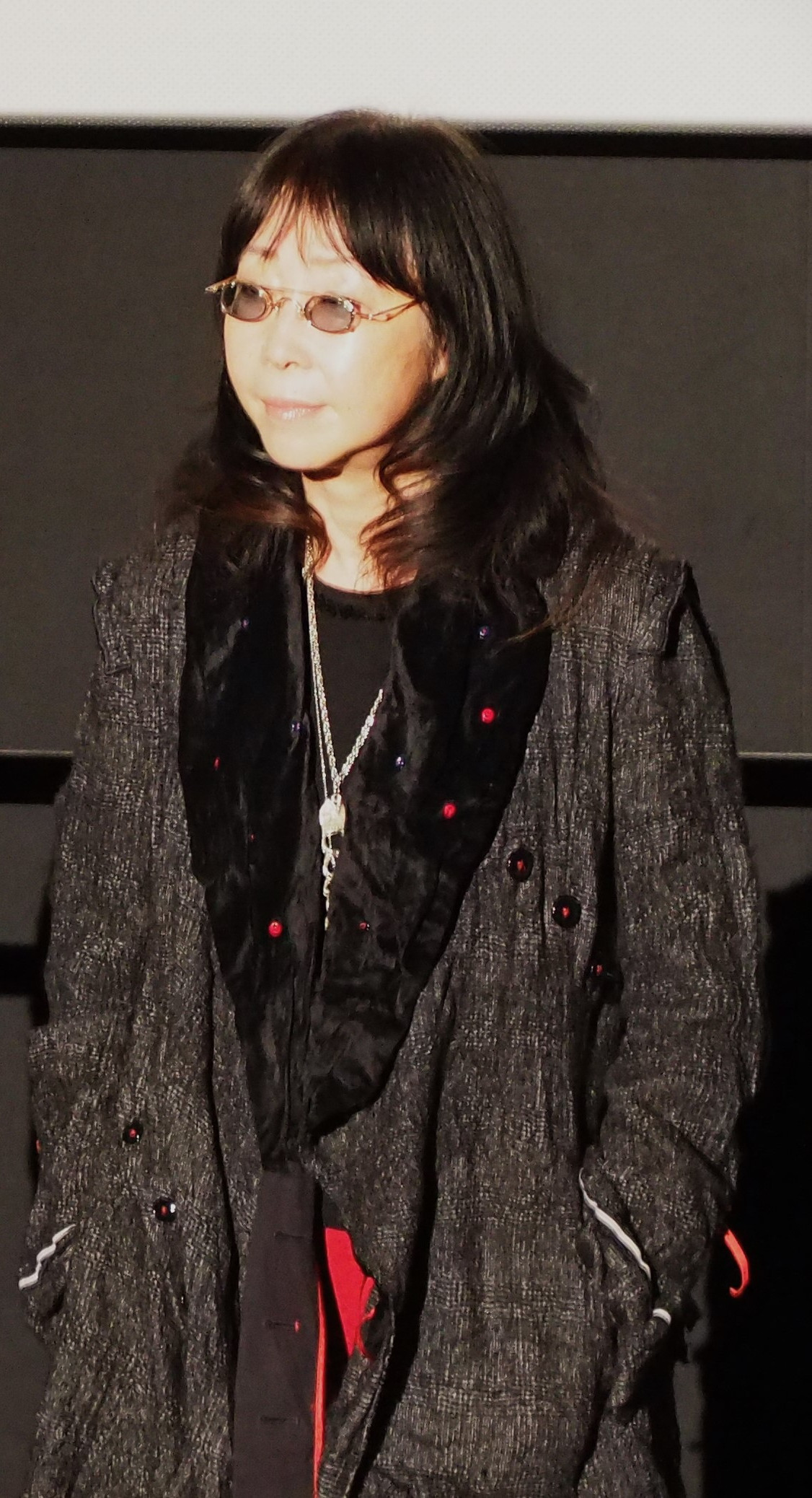
- Cheung at the 2015 Toronto International Film Festival
- Born: 張婉婷; Cheung Yuen-Ting; 17 November 1950 (age 75); British Hong Kong
- Education: University of Hong Kong (B.A. in English Literature and Psychology); University of Bristol; New York University; Ying Wa Girls' School
- Awards: Hong Kong Film Awards – Best Director; 1986 Illegal Immigrant Golden Horse Awards – Best Film; 1988 Painted Faces; Best Original Screenplay; 1988 Painted Faces

Chinese name
- Traditional Chinese: 張婉婷
Transcriptions
Yue: Cantonese
- Jyutping: zoeng1 jyun2 ting4

Mabel Cheung Yuen Ting (Chinese: 張婉婷, born 17 November 1950) is a film director from Hong Kong. She is one of the leading directors in Hong Kong cinema and is considered one of the three women (along with Ann Hui and Clara Law) to achieve acclaim in the New Wave/Second Wave in Hong Kong. Cheung made her first film in 1985 as a student at New York University. Cheung is known for working with the migration issues of Hongkongers and overseas Chinese, especially before the 1997 handover of Hong Kong.

Her films include the "migration trilogy": The Illegal Immigrant (1985), An Autumn's Tale (1987) and Eight Taels of Gold (1989). The Soong Sisters (1997) marks another peak of her filming career. All four films were made in collaboration with writer Alex Law.

Cheung is a guest lecturer at the Hong Kong Baptist University Academy of Film and an Honorary University Fellow at the University of Hong Kong.

Cheung is the Vice-Chairperson of the Hong Kong Film Development Council.

== Filmography ==
Year	Title	Notes
2022	To My Nineteen-Year-Old Self	
2017	The Chinese Widow; US Title called In Harm's Way (2017 film)	Writer
2015	A Tale of Three Cities 三城記	
2010	Echoes of the Rainbow 歲月神偷	
2003	Traces of a Dragon: Jackie Chan & His Lost Family 龍的深處-失落的拼圖	Nominated - Golden Horse Awards for Best Documentary
2001	Beijing Rocks 北京樂與路	
1998	City of Glass 玻璃之城	Nominated - Hong Kong Film Award for Best Director; Nominated - Hong Kong Film Award for Best Screenplay
1997	The Soong Sisters 宋家皇朝	Nominated - Hong Kong Film Award for Best Film; Nominated - Hong Kong Film Award for Best Director
1992	Now You See Love, Now You Don't 我愛扭紋柴	
1991	The Banquet 豪門夜宴	
1991	Twin Dragons 雙龍會	
1989	Eight Taels of Gold 八兩金	Nominated - Hong Kong Film Award for Best Director; Nominated - Hong Kong Film Award for Best Screenplay
1988	Painted Faces 七小福	Nominated - Hong Kong Film Award for Best Screenplay
1987	An Autumn's Tale 秋天的童話	Hong Kong Film Award for Best Film; Nominated - Hong Kong Film Award for Best Director
1985	The Illegal Immigrant 非法移民	Hong Kong Film Award for Best Director; Special Jury Award (Asia-Pacific Film Festival)

== The To My Nineteen-Year-Old-Self Controversies ==
In January 2023, three graduates of Ying Wa Girls' School accused Cheung and the school authority of wrongdoing through the public distribution of To My Nineteen-Year-Old Self, the film commissioned by Cheung's alma mater Ying Wa Girls' School for an alumni fundraising project. Three of the six subjects of the film accused Ying Wa and Cheung of placing what was originally promised as an internal project on public screens without their consents. Katie Kong, one of the documentary’s subjects, said in an Instagram story that she had signed the consent after the film crew told her “everyone else” had done so.

In the documentary, Cheung's camera follows six schoolgirls for over a decade to witness the agony and ecstasy of growing up during a turbulent time in Hong Kong.

Wai-sze Sarah Lee, Hong Kong professional track cyclist and bronze medalist in the women's keirin at the 2012 London Olympics, also accused Cheung and the crew of including an interview clip with her in the film without consent. In a radio interview Cheung admitted that she and the crew entered the venue of Asian Track Cycling Championships in Japan without a valid press permit. This raised the concern from the Hong Kong Sport Press Association of unauthorised interview events for non-press purposes.

Cheung apologized and announced on 5 February the screenings of To My Nineteen Year Old Self will be suspended until all issues are clarified.

== See also ==
- List of graduates of University of Hong Kong
