= Alex Law =

Hong Kong film director, screenwriter, and producer (1952–2022)

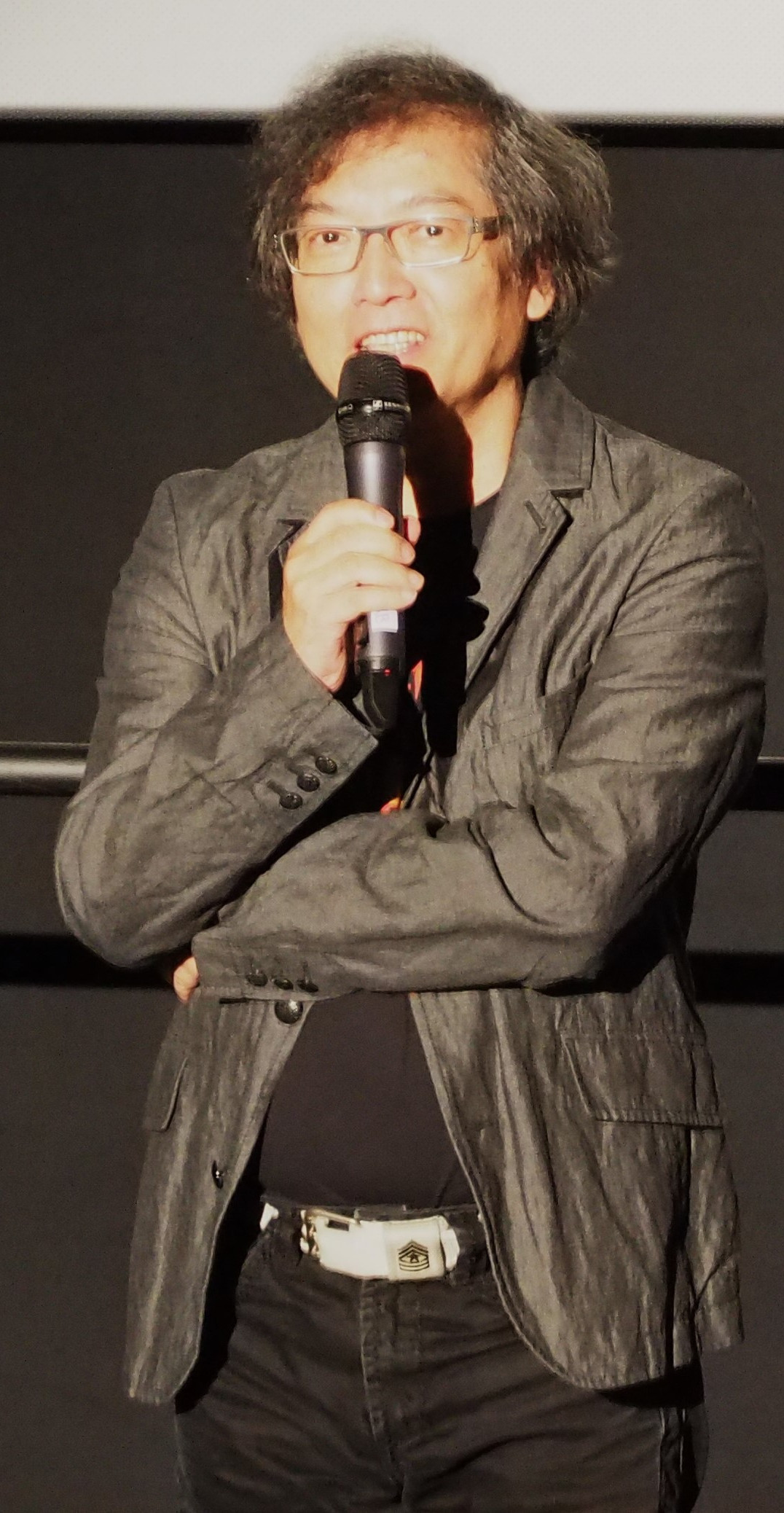
- Law at the 2015 Toronto International Film Festival
- Born: 羅啟銳; Law Kai-Yui; 19 August 1952; British Hong Kong
- Died: 2 July 2022 (aged 69); Hong Kong
- Education: University of Hong Kong (B.A. in Chinese, English and Comparative Literature); New York University
- Awards: Hong Kong Film Awards – Best Screenplay; 1988 An Autumn's Tale; 2010 Echoes of the Rainbow; Best Original Film Song; 2010 Echoes of the Rainbow Golden Horse Awards – Best Original Screenplay; 1998 City of Glass

Alexander Law Kai-Yui (Chinese: 羅啟銳; 19 August 1952 – 2 July 2022) was a Hong Kong film director, screenwriter, and producer.

Law was educated at the Diocesan Boys' School, Hong Kong, matriculating in 1971. Law collaborated with Mabel Cheung on many of her most famous films, including the "Migration Trilogy": Illegal Immigrant (1985), An Autumn's Tale (1987) and Eight Taels of Gold (1989). He wrote the screenplay for Cheung's The Soong Sisters (1997).

== Awards and nominations ==
Year	Film	Awards and Nominations	Occasion
2010	Echoes of the Rainbow (2009)	Won: Best Screenplay	29th Hong Kong Film Awards
2010	Echoes of the Rainbow (2009)	Won: Best Original Film Song	29th Hong Kong Film Awards
1988	An Autumn's Tale (1987)	Won: Best Screenplay	7th Hong Kong Film Awards
1988	Painted Faces (1988)	Won: Best Director	25th Golden Horse Film Festival and Awards
