= Seung Mei Yan Gaan =

Seung Mei Yan Gaan (賞味人間; Appreciate The Taste Of Life)

Studio album by Candy Lo
- Released: 7 July 2002
- Recorded: Hong Kong
- Genre: C-rock, pop rock, alternative rock, cantopop
- Label: Sony BMG Music Entertainment (Hong Kong)
- Producer: Kubert Leung, Candy Lo

Candy Lo chronology
Fantasy (2001)	Seung Mei Yan Gaan (賞味人間; Appreciate The Taste Of Life) (2002)	Candy's Airline

Seung Mei Yan Gaan (賞味人間; Appreciate The Taste Of Life) is rock/pop-singer Candy Lo's 6th studio album. It was released on 7 July 2002. For this album Candy Lo worked together with Hong Kong producer Kubert Leung (梁翹柏) with whom she had worked on previous albums, such as Fantasy.

There are two editions of this album. The first has only one disc and a VCD with the music videos for three of the album's songs. The second edition contains an extra disc with four different versions of "Break-Up With Good Intentions" (好心分手) of which the first track is a duet version featuring Leehom Wang (王力宏). The other three are remixes of the original solo version. The second edition also comes with a VCD. This one is different from the one with the first edition because it has an extra music video, the version of "Break-Up With Good Intentions" featuring Leehom Wang.

== Track listing ==
Rough translations of song titles in brackets.

Disc 1

1. "好心分手" Hou2 Sam1 Fan1 Sau2 (Break-Up With Good Intentions)
2. "很想當媽媽" Han2 Seung2 Dong1 Ma1 Ma1 (Longing To Become A Mother)
3. "大細路" Daai6 Sai3 Lou6 (Big Children)
4. "夠膽戀愛" Gau3 Daam2 Lyun5 Oi3 (Courage To Love)
5. "天蠍號" Tin1 Hit3 Hou6 (Scorpio Symbol)
6. "亂世佳人" Lyun6 Sai3 Gaai1 Yan4 (Gone With The Wind)
7. "大人國漫遊" Daai6 Yan4 Gwok3 Maan6 Yau4 (Roaming The Adult World)
8. "半日假期" Bun3 Yat6 Ga3 Kei4 (Half-Day Vacation)
9. "自學青年" Ji6 Hok6 Ching1 Nin4 (Self-Learnt Youth)
10. "天下" Tin1 Ha6 (The World)
11. "藥師佛心咒" Yeuk6 Si1 Fat6 Sam1 Jau3 (Pharmacist Benevolence Incantation)
12. "至少走得比你早" Zhì Shǎo Zǒu Dé Bǐ Nǐ Zǎo (At Least I Leave Earlier Than You)

Disc 2

1. "好心分手" Featuring Leehom Wang (王力宏)
2. "好心分手" 別戀版 Bit6 Lyun2 Baan2 (Do Not Love Edition) 口琴伴奏 Hau2 Kam4 Bun6 Jau3 (Harmonica Accompaniment)
3. "好心分手" 亢奮版 Gong1 Fan5 Baan2 (Stimulated Edition) 44BD Mix bpm 150
4. "好心分手" Drum & Bass 揼心版 Dam2 Sam1 Baan2 (Regret Edition) 165 GTA Mix

VCD

1. "好心分手"
2. "好心分手" Featuring Leehom Wang (王力宏)
3. "很想當媽媽"
4. "自學青年"
