= Fa Yin Haau Yu =

Fa1 Yin4 Haau2 Yu5 (花言.巧語; Flower Talk)

Studio album by Candy Lo
- Released: November 28, 2003
- Recorded: Hong Kong
- Genres: C-pop, rock
- Label: Sony BMG Music Entertainment (Hong Kong)
- Producers: Kubert Leung, Candy Lo

Candy Lo chronology
| True Music 1st Flight Love 2003 (2003) | Fa1 Yin4 Haau2 Yu5 (花言.巧語; Flower Talk) (2003) | 4 Seasons in One Day (2004) |

Fa1 Yin4 Haau2 Yu5 (花言.巧語; Flower Talk) is Candy Lo's 8th studio album. It was released on November 28, 2003. For this album Candy Lo worked together with Hong Kong producer Kubert Leung (梁翹柏) with whom she worked on previous albums, such as Tong Gwo Hong Hung (糖果航空; Candy's Airline), as well.

== Track listing ==
CD 1

Part I

1. "複合" Fuk1 Hap6 (Compound) - 1:05
2. "秘密花園" Bei3 Mat6 Fa1 Yun4 (Secret Garden) - 3:32
3. "落地開花" Lok6 Dei6 Hoi1 Fa4 (Flower Blossoms When It Falls To The Ground) - 2:30
4. "刺" Chi3 (Thorn) - 3:37
5. "命犯桃花" Ming6 Faan6 Tou4 Fa1 (Life Violates Peach Blossoms) - 3:41

Part II

1. "斷腸" Dyun5 Cheung4 (Broken Heart) - 0:54
2. "花奴" Fa1 Nou4 (Flower Slave) - 3:14
3. "逆插玫瑰" Yik6 Chaap3 Mui4 Gwai3 (Rose Upside Down) - 3:27
4. "暗花" Am3 Fa1 (Hidden Flower – Slush Fund) - 3:34
5. "暗花2" Am3 Fa1 (Hidden Flower – Slush Fund 2) - 2:58

Part III

1. "朝陽" Chiu4 Yeung4 (Morning Sun - Chaoyang) - 0:57
2. "花瓶" Fa1 Ping4 (Vase - Superficial) - 3:16
3. "風吹不走笑容" Fung1 Cheui1 Bat1 Jau2 Siu3 Yung4 (The Wind Can't Blow Away A Smile) 3:06
4. "滿天飛" Mun5 Tin1 Fei1 (Flying All Through The Sky) 4:08

CD 2

Part IV

1. "百合" Bǎi Hé (Lily) - 0:37
2. "黑水仙" Hēi Shuǐ Xiān (Black Daffodil) 2:31
3. "落地開花 Celtic X'mas Mix" Lok6 Dei6 Hoi1 Fa4 (Flower Blossoms When It Falls To The Ground) - 13:26

VCD

1. "落地開花"
2. "逆插玫瑰"
3. "命犯桃花"
