= Sik Fong =

2000 studio album by Candy Lo

Sik Fong (色放; Colour Release)

Studio album by Candy Lo
- Released: 1 April 2000
- Recorded: Hong Kong
- Genre: C-rock, pop rock, alternative rock, xantopop
- Label: Sony BMG Music Entertainment (Hong Kong)
- Producer: Kubert Leung, Candy Lo (貼近盧巧音; Get Close To Candy) (1999)

Candy Lo chronology
Tip Gan Lou Haau Yam	Sik Fong (色放; Colour Release) (2000)	MUSE (2000)

Sik Fong (色放; Colour Release) is Cantopop-rock singer Candy Lo's third studio album. It was released on 1 April 2000. For this album Candy Lo continued her collaboration with Hong Kong producer Kubert Leung with whom she worked on most of the tracks on her previous albums.

== Track listing ==
1. "色與情" Sik1 Yu5 Ching4 (Colour & Sentiment)
2. "暖色" Nyun5 Sik1 (Warm Colour)
3. Hong Hong Shi (紅紅是......; Red Is As Red Is…, literally, Red Red Is
- Sung in Cantonese. Title Jyutping: Hung4 Hung4 Si6
1. "與醉金" Spighe di grana padano (Red Cavalli)
2. "深藍" Sam1 Laam4 (Dark Blue) (lyrics composed by Jozev Kiu)
3. "白與黑" Baak6 Yu5 Hak1 (White And Black)
4. Bai Guang (白光; White Light)
- Sung in Cantonese. Title Jyutping: Baak6 Gwong1
1. "紫醉金迷" Ji2 Jeui3 Gam1 Mai4 (Intoxicating Purple, Indistinct Gold)
2. "綠化作用" Luk6 Fa3 Jok3 Yung6 (The Transforming Effect of Green)
3. "日出日落" Yat6 Cheut1 Yat6 Lok6 (Sunrise, Sunset)
4. "霎!" Sap3 (In The Blink of an Eye!)
5. Xīn Lán (心藍; Heart blue)
- Sung in Mandarin
1. Huáng Yuè Liàng (黃月亮; Yellow Moon)
- Sung in Mandarin
1. Qíng Yǔ Biàn (情與變; Emotion And Change)
- Sung in Mandarin
