= Miao... =

miao...

Studio album by Candy Lo
- Released: 2 December 1998
- Recorded: Hong Kong
- Genre: C-rock
- Label: Sony Music (Hong Kong)
- Producer: Kubert Leung

Candy Lo chronology
Don't Have to be... Too Perfect (1998)	miao... (1998)	Getting Closer to Candy Lo (1999)

Miao is Candy Lo's 1st full studio album. It was released on 2 December 1998, one day after her debut EP. The theme of this album is "cat".

== Track listing ==
1. 同居角落 Tung4 Geui1 Gok3 Lok6 (Housemate Corner)
2. 接受現實 Gam2 Jip3 Sau6 Yin6 Sat6 (Accepting Reality)
3. 不如睡一睡 Bat1 Yu4 Seui6 Yat1 (Let's Have A Nap)
4. 無人王國 Mou4 Yan4 Wong4 Gwok3 (Uninhabited Kingdom)
5. 夜 Ye6 (Night)
6. 半支怨歌 Bun3 Ji1 Yun3 Go1 (Half Resentful Song)
7. 記念品 Gei3 Nim6 Ban2 (Souvenir)
8. 快感飛行 Faai3 Gam2 Fei1 Haang4 (Pleasant Sensational Flight)
9. 怪怪房 Gwaai3 Gwaai3 Fong4 (A Strange Room)
10. 我很舒服 Ngo5 Han2 Syu1 Fuk4 (I Feel Very Comfortable)
