= Evolution Theory =

Evolution Theory may refer to:

- Evolution theory, change in the heritable characteristics of biological populations over successive generations
- Evolution Theory (Candy Lo album)
- Evolution Theory (Modestep album)
