= Evolution Theory (Candy Lo album) =

Evolution Theory 天演論

Studio album by Candy Lo
- Released: 14 June 2005
- Recorded: Hong Kong
- Genre: Cantopop, Chinese rock
- Length: 44:51
- Label: Sony Music (Hong Kong)
- Producer: Kubert Leung, Candy Lo

Candy Lo chronology
4 Seasons in One Day (2004)	Evolution Theory 天演論 (2005)	Process (2007)

Evolution Theory
- Chinese: 天演論
Transcriptions
Yue: Cantonese
- Yale Romanization: Tin Yin Leun

Professional ratings
Review scores
Source	Rating
Karazen	link
Sony BMG Music Entertainment	link

Evolution Theory (天演論) is Hong Kong singer Candy Lo's 9th studio album and her last with Sony Music. Lo co-produced the album with long-time collaborator Kubert Leung.

== Track listing ==
1. 露西 (3,180,000 B.C.) Lou6 Sai1 (Lucy) – 3:32
2. 天外飛仙 Tin1 Ngoi6 Fei1 Sin1 (Fairy From Wonderland) – 3:51
3. 阿修羅樹海 A3 Sau1 Lo4 Syu6 Hoi2 (Asura Sea Of Trees) – 04:24
4. 隔岸觀音 Gaak3 Ngon6 Gun1 Yam1 (Guan Yin from Across the Shore) – 3:53 –
5. 一念天堂 Yat1 Nim6 Tin1 Tong4 (A Single Thought of Heaven) – 3:38
6. 步天歌 Bou6 Tin1 Go1 (Song of the Sky Pacers) – 3:54
7. 女書 Neui5 Syu1 (Women's Script) – 3:49
8. 笛卡兒的長生殿 Dek6 Ka2 Yi4 Dik1 Cheung4 Saang1 Din6 (Cartesian Immortal Palace) – 3:15
9. 送魂經 Sung3 Wan4 Ging1 (Sutra For Seeing Souls Off) – 3:25
10. 敵托邦的拾荒姑娘 Dik6 Tok3 Bong1 Dik1 Sap6 Fong1 Gu1 Neung4 (Junk Girl Of Dystopia) – 3:10
11. 阿修羅樹海 (國) Ā Xiū Luó Shù Hǎi (Asura Sea Of Trees) – 4:24
12. 露西 (3,180,000 B.C. – ) Lù Xī (Lucy) – 3:36
