= Jozev Kiu =

Hong Kong writer (born 1969)

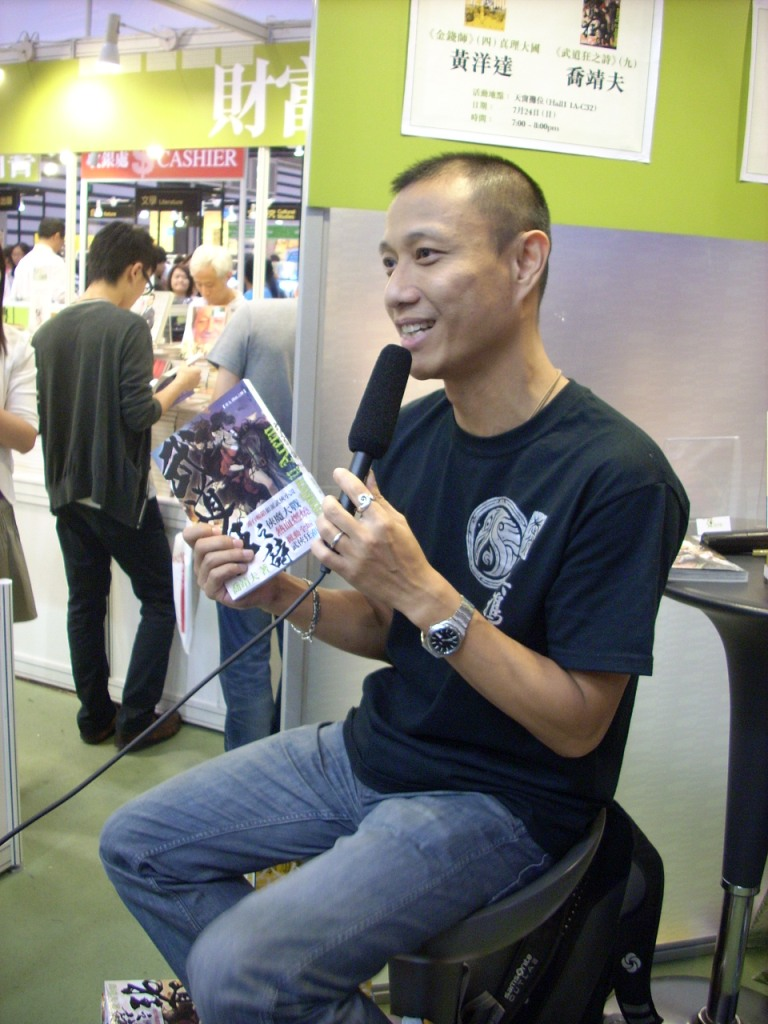
- Kiu in July 2011
- Born: Lau Wai-ming; 1969; Hong Kong
- Education: The City University of Hong Kong (BA)
- Notable work: Blood and Steel (2008)

Lau Wai-ming (Chinese: 劉偉明; born 1969), known by his pen name Jozev Kiu Ching-fu (喬靖夫), is a Hong Kong wuxia novelist, lyricist and Eskrima coach. His magnum opus, Blood and Steel, had received widespread acclaim and Kiu is regarded as one of the leading figures of the post-Jin Yong Hong Kong wuxia fiction genre.

== Early life and education ==
Kiu was born Lau Wai-ming in 1969 in Hong Kong. He had his secondary education at Cheung Sha Wan Catholic Secondary School and was classmate with musician Adrian Chow. He began learning karate when he was 15 and spent most of his secondary school life on basketball, gaming and reading manga. He later attended The City University of Hong Kong and graduated with a bachelor's degree in translation.

== Career ==
=== Writing ===
Kiu started to write Wuxia fiction and completed his first novel, The Unparalleled Statesman (Chinese: 國士無雙), during his university years. Kiu published his debut novel The Blade of the Phantom Kingdom (Chinese: 幻國之刃) in 1996, and he began to receive public attention. He later also wrote The Vampire Hunter’s Diaries (Chinese: 吸血鬼獵人日誌) and The Killing Zen (Chinese: 殺禪), which the latter took Kiu ten years to finish. The lengthy writing process earned him the nickname of "Hong Kong’s most procrastinated writer" (Chinese: 香江第一遲筆).

In 2008, he published another novel series, Blood and Steel. The series was perceived as a milestone of the reformed Hong Kong wuxia genre as it differed from the traditional Wuxia fiction which put emphasis on the code of chivalry and Chinese traditions. Kiu was also one of the few wuxia novelists who possessed a martial arts background, and the realistic action sequences in the novel series received universal praise. After the success of Blood and Steel, Kiu was widely regarded as a leading figure of the "New Wuxia" genre in the post-Jin Yong era.

Kiu had also composed lyrics for Cantopop songs since 1998. He won the Yearly Best Lyricist Prize of the Composers and Authors Society of Hong Kong in 2000 with Candy Lo's Dark Blue.

=== Martial arts ===
Kiu is skilled in karate, Wing Chun and Eskrima. He obtained a brown belt in karate, and began practicing Eskrima since 2009, later participating in several international competitions. He had also received professional training in the Philippines in 2012, and served as a guest host of the RTHK martial arts documentary series, Kung Fu Quest (Chinese: 功夫傳奇), for several years. Kiu also co-founded and taught at Kalis Brotherhood, an Eskrima coaching school.

=== Film ===
Kiu was invited by filmmaker Wilson Yip, who had approached him to adapt his novels but ended up in development hell years ago, to join the production of the 2024 martial arts film Twilight of the Warriors: Walled In, as the crew was seeking an unfamiliar face with sufficient martial arts skills for the role, and Kiu accepted the offer. He portrayed Double Blade, a restaurateur and butcher who was secretly a skillful swordsman loyal to Cyclone, the chief guardian of the Walled City, played by Louis Koo. Kiu incorporated Eskrima as his chosen fighting style in the film and performed his own stunts, including a fight sequence against Sammo Hung and an unused scene featuring him fighting three thugs simultaneously. Kiu was nominated for Best New Performer in the 43rd Hong Kong Film Awards with the role.

== Personal life ==
Kiu was married in March 2011.

Kiu was a supporter of the Anti-Extradition Law Amendment Bill Movement. He wrote essays to express his political views and had compared the protests with Bruce Lee’s philosophy of errantry.

== Bibliography ==
- The Blade of the Phantom Kingdom (Chinese: 幻國之刃; 1996) (2 parts)
- Seraph (2 parts)
- The Vampire Hunter’s Diaries (Chinese: 吸血鬼獵人日誌; 2004) (6 volumes)
- The Killing Zen (Chinese: 殺禪; 2007) (8 volumes)
- Blood and Steel (Chinese: 武道狂之詩; 2008–2018) (21 volumes)

== Filmography ==
=== Film ===
Year	Title	Role	Notes
2024	Twilight of the Warriors: Walled In	Double Blade (阿七)	Cameo
2025	Hit N Fun	Romeo Kiu (喬晴夫)	

== Awards and nominations ==
Year	Award	Category	Work	Result	Ref.
2025	43rd Hong Kong Film Awards	Best New Performer	Twilight of the Warriors: Walled In	Nominated	
