= Getting Closer to Candy Lo =

Getting Closer to Candy Lo 貼近盧巧音

Studio album by Candy Lo
- Released: 1999
- Recorded: Hong Kong
- Genre: Cantopop, Chinese rock
- Label: Sony Music (Hong Kong)
- Producer: Kubert Leung, Candy Lo

Candy Lo chronology
Miao... (1998)	Getting Closer to Candy Lo 貼近盧巧音 (1999)	Colour Release (2000)

Getting Closer to Candy Lo
- Chinese: 貼近盧巧音
Transcriptions
Yue: Cantonese
- Yale Romanization: Tip Gan Lou Haau Yam

Professional ratings
Review scores
Source	Rating
MTV Chinese	3/5 stars

Getting Closer to Candy Lo (貼近盧巧音) is Hong Kong singer Candy Lo's 2nd studio album. It was released on 1 August 1999. Lo collaborated with Hong Kong producer Kubert Leung.

== Track listing ==
1. 人氣急升 Yan4 Hei3 Gap1 Sing1 (Popularity Surge)
2. 感官世界 Gam2 Gun1 Sai3 Gaai3 (Sensual World)
3. 新陳代謝 San1 Chan4 Doi6 Je6 (Regeneration)
4. 一毫米 Yat1 Hou4 Mai5 (One Millimeter)
5. 蝴蝶吻 Wu4 Dip6 Man5 (Butterfly Kiss)
6. 長夜 My Love Good Night Cheung4 Ye6 (Endless Night)
7. 聽雨的歌 Ting1 Yu5 Dik1 Go1 (Listen To The Rain's Song)
8. 絲路 Si1 Lou6 (The Silk Road)
9. 你太好 Nei5 Taai3 Hou2 (You're Too Kind)
10. 我愛廚房 Ngo5 Ngoi3 chyu4 Fong2 (I Love Kitchen)
11. La La La
12. 我好想他 Ngo5 Hou2 Seung2 Ta1 (I Really Miss Him)
13. 麻醉 Ma4 Jeui3 (Anesthesia)
