= Hit N Fun =

2025 Hong Kong film by Albert Mak

- Theatrical poster
- Traditional Chinese: 臨時決鬥
- Jyutping: Lam^{4} Si^{4} Kyut^{3} Dau^{3}
- Directed by: Albert Mak
- Screenplay by: Albert Mak; Jessica Lam; Link Ling; Julie Lau
- Story by: Jessica Lam
- Produced by: Kinnie Cheung
- Starring: Louis Koo; Gigi Leung; Louise Wong; Chrissie Chau; Tony Wu; German Cheung; Peter Chan
- Cinematography: Rick Lau; Lui Kei-ching
- Edited by: Alan Cheng
- Music by: Joey Chu
- Production companies: Ovation Entertainment; One Cool Film Production; Entertaining Power
- Distributed by: Edko Films
- Release dates: 18 January 2025 (Studio City Macau); 28 January 2025 (Hong Kong)
- Running time: 108 minutes
- Country: Hong Kong
- Language: Cantonese

Hit N Fun (Chinese: 臨時決鬥) is a 2025 Hong Kong comedy film directed and co-written by Albert Mak. Serving as a spiritual successor to Mak's Rob N Roll (2024), the film is co-produced by One Cool Film Production and Entertaining Power. It features an ensemble cast, including Louis Koo, Gigi Leung, Louise Wong, Chrissie Chau, Tony Wu, German Cheung, and Peter Chan. The story revolves around a businesswoman (Wong) who challenges a Muay Thai champion (Chau) to a boxing match, navigating life through her training with her coach (Koo).

Following the critical success of the Chinese New Year film Rob N Roll, Albert Mak began developing his next feature with Louis Koo and screenwriter Link Ling. In July 2024, he pivoted the project into a New Year film due to a lack of productions in that genre. Principal photography took place in Hong Kong and Macau from October to November, and post-production wrapped up in December, with the entire development process spanning three to four months. The film's theme song "Pick Me Up" was performed by Tony Wu and featured various cast members in the rap sections.

The film had its world premiere at Studio City Macau on 18 January 2025, followed by a theatrical release in Hong Kong on 28 January, as a Chinese New Year film of the Year of Snake. It became the highest-grossing New Year film released in Hong Kong during Lunar New Year, though its overall box office performance was considered disappointing.

== Plot ==
Carrie, a washed-up actress, receives an advertisement referral from her manager, Bridget, to Bridget's niece, Elsa. However, when Carrie discovers the advertisement is for a menopause supplement, she refuses to participate, leading to a heated argument with Elsa. After their fallout, Bridget finds a parcel left behind by Elsa, containing a framed photograph of her ex-boyfriend, Daniel, and Surewin, a Macau boxing champion and former apprentice of Carrie's husband, Bruce. Despite Daniel's insistence that Elsa break up with him, she has been clinging to their relationship. Carrie and Bridget deduce that Elsa intends to confront Surewin, prompting them to rush to his home to intervene. However, Elsa has already found Surewin, and a fight breaks out. When Carrie and Bridget arrive, a crowd is already attracted and videos of the brawl go viral, damaging Surewin's reputation. As a result, Arnold, another former apprentice of Bruce's who runs a for-profit boxing gym with Surewin, temporarily suspends her.

Ironically, the viral video brings Carrie back into the public eye, leading a film producer to offer her the female lead in an upcoming action film. Meanwhile, Elsa, upset about Daniel choosing Surewin, challenges him to a boxing match to prove her worth. Both Carrie and Elsa seek Bruce's training in boxing to prepare for their respective challenges. Initially, Bruce tries to scare Elsa off by quoting an exorbitant training fee, but she unexpectedly accepts. Reluctantly, he assigns his only remaining apprentice, Stallone, to train her. Bruce doubts Elsa will last a week, but she endures his grueling sessions, changing his perception of her. Stallone, meanwhile, discusses the upcoming match with Arnold and Surewin, who agrees to host it if they can sell tickets and livestream the event. Surewin declares that if Elsa can withstand three rounds, she will win.

As both Elsa and Carrie progress in their training, Carrie is informed by the producer that she has been replaced by a younger actress, forcing her to halt her boxing training. During a jog at the waterfront, Elsa encounters Surewin, who encourages her to let go of her tough persona. She reaches out to Daniel and finally accepts his request to break up. After reflecting on her situation, Elsa talks to Stallone, who shares his own struggles with a long losing streak, inspiring her to persist in boxing. Stallone's 38th match ends in another defeat and serious injury. Arnold visits him in the hospital, coincidentally meeting Bruce there. Their conversation escalates into an argument about their differing philosophies on running a boxing gym. It is revealed that Bruce did not fight Arnold, declaring his own defeat to protect Stallone's reputation. Arnold challenges Bruce again, who accepts.

The matches between Bruce and Arnold, and Elsa and Surewin, are scheduled simultaneously. In their bout, Surewin initially dominates, but Elsa manages to knock her down in the second round, prompting a furious counterattack. Despite her injuries, Elsa endures Surewin's punches in the third round, earning her respect and allowing her to claim victory. Meanwhile, Bruce decisively outmatches Arnold. As he prepares to deliver his final punch, he intentionally avoids hitting Arnold and instead punches a punchbag behind him, causing it to break and sand to pour out. Arnold instinctively rushes to protect the punchbag, which holds sentimental value as the first piece of equipment in the gym. Witnessing Arnold's attachment to their shared memories, Bruce and Arnold reconcile. At last, Arnold and Surewin help run Bruce's gym, with Elsa joining in efforts to expand the business, as they discuss future plans over dinner.

== Cast ==
- Louis Koo as Bruce Chung, a faded martial arts master and former Muay Thai champion
- Gigi Leung as Carrie Mok, Bruce's wife and a washed-up actress
- Louise Wong as Elsa Lam, a high-flying advertising executive
- Chrissie Chau as Surewin Suen, a Muay Thai champion and Bruce's former disciple
- Tony Wu as Stallone Ko, a long-losing Muay Thai boxer and the youngest of Bruce's disciples
- German Cheung as Arnold Chan, a boxing gym owner and Bruce's former disciple
- Peter Chan as Daniel Wu, a painter who previously dated Elsa and is currently in a relationship with Surewin
- Harriet Yeung as Bridget Lam, Carrie's agent and Elsa's aunt
- Hedy Wong as Aimer Chung, Bruce and Carrie's daughter

Also appearing in the film are Philip Ng as Tank Wong, a Pattaya-based boxing champion and Bruce's brother-in-arms; novelist Jozev Kiu as Romeo Kiu, a philanthropist looking to purchase the Bruce's boxing gym; Kathy Wong and Henry Chan as Bingo and Ringo, Elsa Lam's assistants; and Law Wing-cheung as Paco Wong, a film producer. Macanese singer Vivian Chan cameos as a nurse.

== Production ==
=== Development ===
After the critical success of Rob N Roll (2024), director Albert Mak and screenwriter Link Ling began developing the screenplay for their next feature film, with Louis Koo involved from the early stages. Mak initially intended the film to be a regular drama rather than a Chinese New Year film. But as no New Year films were announced to be in production during the summer of 2024, when films of this genre are typically revealed, Mak was approached in July to produce one, prompting him to pivot the project accordingly. Despite this change, Mak told investors that the film is not a traditional Chinese New Year film but rather a film being released during the New Year period only. He and Ling began rewriting the screenplay in late August. In September, Mak announced that he was set to direct a film under the working title Middle-aged Ladies Home (Chinese: 中女舍), co-produced by One Cool Film Production and Entertaining Power. However, the production budget had not yet been fully secured, and they missed the deadline to apply for the Hong Kong Film Development Fund, which forced them to seek alternative filming locations, with Mak eyeing Macau.

Pre-production began that same month. In early October, during a meet-and-greet event for Twilight of the Warriors: Walled In (2024), Louis Koo teased that, in addition to a prequel film, the ensemble cast of Walled In was involved in another upcoming project. Later that month, Koo announced that this project would be Albert Mak's Chinese New Year film, though the story is entirely unrelated to the Kowloon Walled City. Lead actors from Walled In, including Koo, Raymond Lam, Philip Ng, Tony Wu, and German Cheung, returned to star, while Louise Wong, Gigi Leung, Chrissie Chau, and Peter Chan joined the cast. However, Lam clarified that he did not join the project that same month due to scheduling conflicts. In late October, the film's title was revealed to be Hit N Fun alongside the commencement of production, and it serves as a spiritual successor to Mak's previous feature Rob N Roll. Kathy Wong, who starred in Rob N Roll, also returned to the project. To prepare for their roles, Gigi Leung, Louise Wong, Chrissie Chau, and Harriet Yeung underwent Muay Thai training before filming, with Leung's training spanning about a month. Hedy Wong, who played Fishball in Walled In, was also cast in the film, with Leung describing her role as "a buffer" for the film's plot. An official trailer was released in early December. Post-production was completed within the same month, with the entire development of the film from start to finish spanning only three to four months.

=== Filming ===
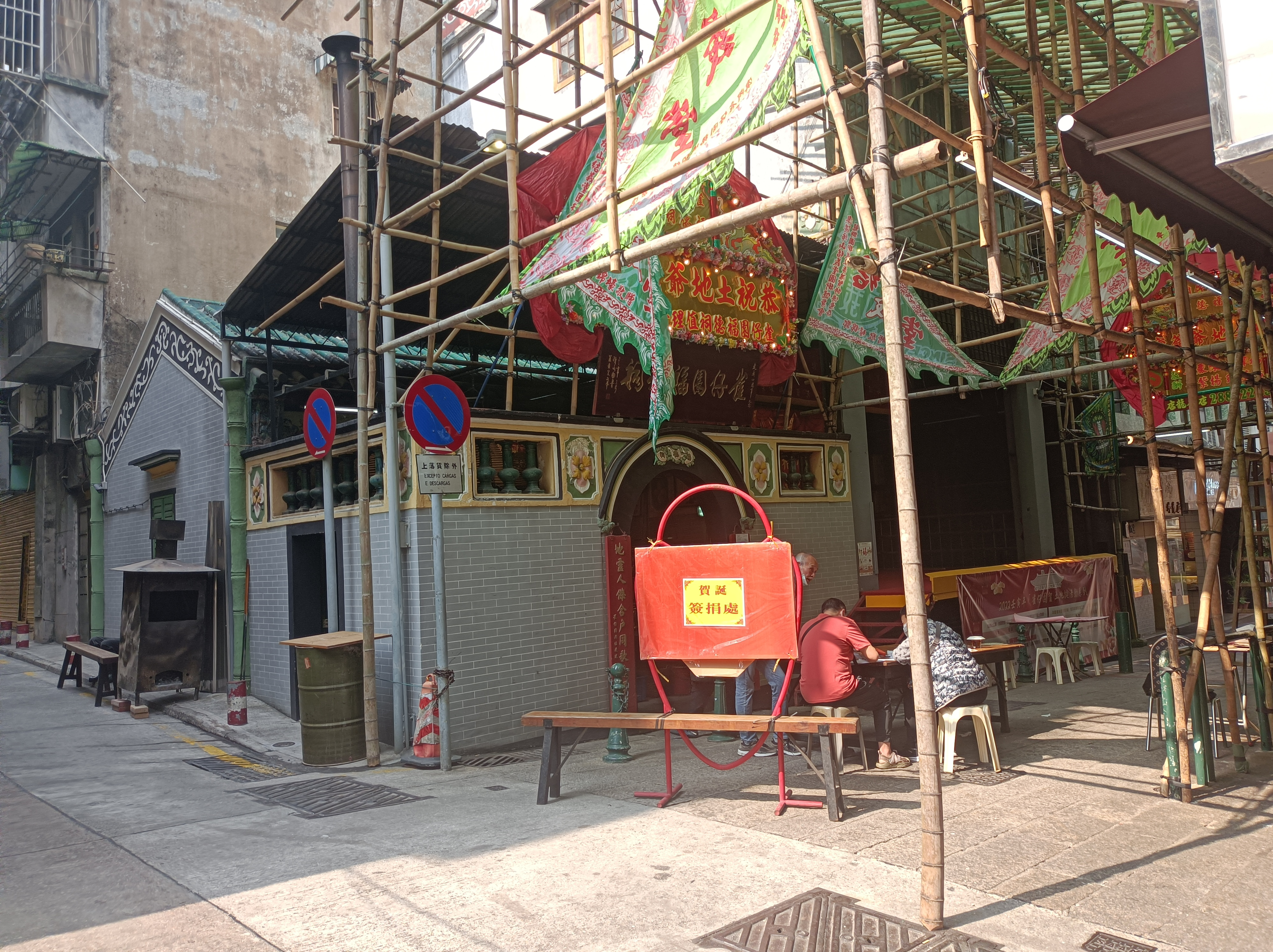
A temple worshipping scene was shot at the Ancestral Temple of Fok Tak in Horta da Mitra, Macau Peninsula.

Principal photography began on 22 October 2024, with Rick Lau and Lui Kei-ching as cinematographers. Lawrence Cheng was announced in a co-starring role alongside the commencement of filming. (Note: Lawrence Cheng did not appear in the theatrical version of the film.) Chrissie Chau was injured while filming a fight scene on the first day, requiring hospitalization and five stitches. Filming occurred in Central, Hong Kong on 26 October, accompanied by a worship ceremony with the main cast. The crew then moved to Macau for two weeks of shooting. In mid-November, Chau and Gigi Leung filmed a scene at the Ancestral Temple of Fok Tak in Horta da Mitra, Macau Peninsula. Additional locations in Macau included the restaurants Albergue 1601 and Cheung Lam Kei Cafe in Coloane, as well as the Studio City and its water park. Louise Wong, who has acrophobia, filmed a scene with Tony Wu at a vertical water slide featuring a drop-launch capsule at the water park. The shoot continued in Sheung Wan, Hong Kong in late November, where Chau, Wong, and Peter Chan were spotted on set. Filming wrapped on 28 November 2024, spanning a total of 20 days. Koo noted that the shoot took place during three typhoons, which, while not delaying production, caused leaks in the sets during the interior scenes.

=== Music ===
The film features a theme song "Pick Me Up", composed, arranged, and written by Johnny Choi, and performed by Tony Wu. Cast members, including Louise Wong, Chrissie Chau, German Cheung, Peter Chan, Harriet Yeung, Jozev Kiu, Hedy Wong, and Henry Chan, contributed their voices for the rap sections, while Louis Koo and Gigi Leung provided voice-overs for the music video.

== Release ==
Hit N Fun had its world premiere at Studio City Macau on 18 January 2025, followed by a theatrical release in Hong Kong on 28 January as a Chinese New Year film of the Year of Snake. The film was also released in North America and Malaysia on 29 January 2025.

== Reception ==
=== Box office ===
Hit N Fun debuted with a gross of HK$5 million in its opening weekend, topping the weekly box office. The film concluded the Lunar New Year period with a total of HK$7.47 million, ranking first among all 2025 New Year films. It reached HK$10 million by its eighth day, and accumulated HK$12 million after two weeks of release. Although Hit N Fun ranked first among all New Year films released in Hong Kong, the Hong Kong Economic Times described its domestic box office performance as "unsatisfactory". HK01 called the performance "disappointing", noting that its gross had dropped significantly compared to figures from previous years, while The Standard referred to the film as a "festive flop", as it grossed only about one-third of Table for Six 2 (2024), the highest-grossing Hong Kong New Year film of the Year of the Dragon.

Internationally, the film grossed only RM$580,000 in its first two days of release in Malaysia, with Sin Chew Daily and Oriental Daily News describing the figures as "far below expectations". It concluded the New Year film period with a total of RM$927,000, ranking eighth among all New Year films released in Malaysia.

=== Critical response ===
Edmund Lee of the South China Morning Post gave Hit N Fun 3.5/5 stars, describing it as an "unusually warm-hearted boxing drama" that blends "slapstick humor" with a "largely somber tale", prompting characters to reflect on their life goals, reminiscent of Johnnie To's Throw Down (2004), and functioning as "a parable of Hong Kong" amid contemporary social and economic upheaval. Sek Kei gave the film 3/5 stars in his review for Ming Pao, noting that although the plot appears "hastily assembled", the engaging direction and strong performances from the ensemble cast make it enjoyable. Keith Ho, writing for HK01, remarked that while the film lacks the creativity and humor of its predecessor Rob N Roll (2024), it effectively uses its ensemble cast, especially the strong performances of the three female leads, and incorporates elements from Twilight of the Warriors: Walled In (2024) to capitalize on the upsurge, resulting in an appealing and successful commercial film.
