= Muse (Candy Lo album) =

MUSE

Studio album by Candy Lo
- Released: 24 November 2000
- Recorded: Hong Kong
- Genre: C-rock, pop rock, alternative rock, cantopop
- Label: Sony BMG Music Entertainment (Hong Kong)
- Producer: Kubert Leung, Candy Lo

Candy Lo chronology
Sik Fong (色放; Colour Release) (2000)	MUSE (2000)	Fantasy (2001)

Muse is Candy Lo's fourth studio album. It was released on 24 November 2000. All the songs on the album were co-written and co-produced by Kubert Leung and Lo.

== Track listing ==
1. "代你發夢" Doi6 Nei5 Faat3 Mung6 (Representing You In A Dream)
2. "周日床上" Jau1 Yat6 Chong4 Seung5 (A Sunday In Bed)
3. "夜燃燒" Ye6 Yin4 Siu1 (Night Combustion)
4. "日有所思" Yat6 Yau5 So2 Si1 (The Day Contemplates To Some Extent)
5. "我想國" Ngo5 Seung2 Gwok3 (I Want A Country)
6. "佛洛依德愛上林夕" Fat6 Lok3 Yi1 Dak1 Oi3 Seung6 Lam4 Jik6 (Freud In Love With Albert Leung)
7. "事後" Si6 Hau6 (Afterwards)
8. "女魔術師的催眠療法" Neui5 Mo1 Seut6 Si1 Dik1 Cheui1 Min4 Liu4 Faat3 (Female Magician's Hypnotherapy)
9. "世界盡語．冷酷舞景" Sai3 Gaai3 Jeun6 Yu5．Laang5 Huk6 Mou5 Ging2 (he World Depletes Language．A Callous Dance Reflection)
10. "說夢" Syut3 Mung6 (Talking Nonsense)
