= Myung-hee =

- Hangul: 명희
- RR: Myeonghui
- MR: Myŏnghŭi

Myung-hee, also spelled Myong-hui, Myeong-hui, or Myeong-hee, is a Korean given name.

== People ==
People with this name include:

=== Sportspeople ===
- Sim Myeong-hui (born 1925), South Korean male sport shooter
- Han Myeong-hui (born 1945), South Korean female sprinter
- Mo Myeong-hui (born 1963), South Korean female sprinter
- Chung Myung-hee (born 1964), South Korean female badminton player
- Jeong Myung-hee (born 1964), South Korean female basketball player
- Choi Myong-hui (born 1966), North Korean female gymnast
- Jang Myeong-hui (born 1969), South Korean female rower
- Lee Meong-hee (born 1978), South Korean female volleyball player
- Jon Myong-hui (born 1986), North Korean female football goalkeeper
- Hong Myong-hui (footballer) (born 1991), North Korean female football goalkeeper

=== Others ===
- Gim Myeong-hui (1788–?), Joseon dynasty male calligrapher
- Hong Myong-hui (1888–1968), North Korean male novelist
- Lee Myung-hee (born 1943), South Korean businesswoman, chair of the Shinsegae Group
- Yu Myeong-Hee (born 1954), South Korean female microbiologist
- Yoo Myung-hee (born 1967), South Korean female politician
- Ri Myong-hui, North Korean female singer, member of Moranbong Band

== See also ==
- List of Korean given names
