= Tony Wu (actor) =

Hong Kong actor (born 1992)

- 胡子彤
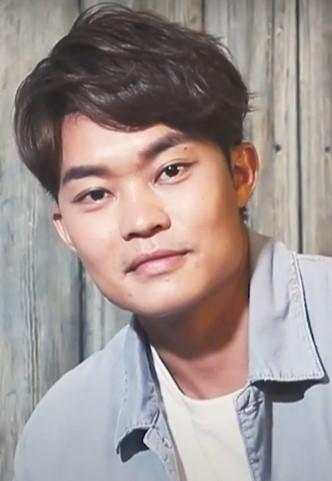
- Wu in July 2020
- Born: Wu Tsz-tung; 16 April 1992 (age 34); Hong Kong
- Education: Hong Kong Baptist University College of International Education
- Occupation: Actor
- Years active: 2016–present

Tony Wu Tsz-tung (Chinese: 胡子彤; born 16 April 1992) is a Hong Kong actor and baseball player best known for his debut role in the sports film Weeds on Fire (2016), which earned him Best New Performer in the 36th Hong Kong Film Awards.

== Biography ==
Wu was born on 16 April 1992. He became interested in baseball at a young age and was selected as a member of the Hong Kong Youth Olympics representative team at the age of 10. He had his secondary education at Christian Alliance Cheng Wing Gee College and participated in the 2010 Asian Games and 2014 Asian Games. After graduation, he attended the Hong Kong Baptist University College of International Education to pursue an associate's degree and continued to play baseball in the Hong Kong team.

In 2016, Wu auditioned and won his debut role as Fan Chun-wai, a troublemaking baseball player, in the sports film Weeds on Fire. He won Best New Performer in the 36th Hong Kong Film Awards with his performance. He was selected to join the Hong Kong team once again in the 2018 Asian Games, but dropped out due to scheduling conflicts with a film project. He also landed a major role in Sunny Chan's first feature film Men On The Dragon. In 2020, Wu received his first major television role in the ViuTV drama series Who Sells Bricks in Hong Kong. From 2021 to 2022, he was cast in a lead role in the drama film I Still Remember and anthology film Septet: The Story of Hong Kong. He also appeared in the action thriller films Raging Fire, Detective vs Sleuths, sports film Zero to Hero, and sci-fi film Warriors of Future.

== Filmography ==
=== Film ===
Year	Title	Role	Notes/Ref.
2016	Weeds on Fire	Fan Chun-wai (范進威)	
2017	Never Too Late	Fai (輝)	
2018	A Beautiful Moment	Assistant	
2018	Men On The Dragon	William	
2019	How to Train Your Dragon: The Hidden World	Hiccup Horrendous Haddock III	Cantonese voice dub
2021	I Still Remember	Lee Chi Hang (李志行)	
2021	Elisa's Day	Man Wai (文偉)	
2021	Raging Fire	Law Kim-wah (羅劍華)	
2021	Zero to Hero	Train Tung (火車東)	
2021	Anita	Calvin Choy	
2022	Chilli Laugh Story	Wendy's son	
2022	Septet: The Story of Hong Kong	Unnamed protagonist	
2022	Detective vs Sleuths	Tsang Cheuk Tung (曾卓彤)	
2022	Warriors of Future	Wong Hoi-yeung (汪海洋)	
2023	Cyber Heist	Tom	
2023	Tales from the Occult：Body and Soul	Sake	
2023	Endless Battle	Anson Lung	
2023	The Goldfinger	Mr. Lo (羅公子)	
2024	Table for Six 2	Cousin (堂哥)	
2024	The Lyricist Wannabe	Chris Lee	
2024	Twilight of the Warriors: Walled In	Twelfth Master (十二少)	
2025	Hit N Fun	Stallone Ko (高秋)	

=== Television ===
Year	Title	Role	Notes/Ref.
2018	Guardian Angel	Jack Fok	Guest role
2019	Stained	Lo Siu-fung (魯少鋒)	Recurring role
2020	Who Sells Bricks in Hong Kong	Lau Man Fai (劉文輝)	Main role
2023	Killing Procedures	Jersey	Recurring role

== Awards and nominations ==
Year	Award	Category	Work	Result	Ref.
2016	53rd Golden Horse Awards	Best New Performer	Weeds on Fire	Nominated	
2017	2017 Hong Kong Film Directors' Guild Awards	Best New Performer	Weeds on Fire	Won	
2017	11th Asian Film Awards	Best Newcomer	Weeds on Fire	Nominated	
2017	36th Hong Kong Film Awards	Best New Performer	Weeds on Fire	Won	
