= Chrissie Chau =

Hong Kong actress and model

- 周秀娜
- Chau in 2024
- Born: Chaozhou, Guangdong, China
- Occupations: Actress; model
- Years active: 2006–present

Chinese name
- Chinese: 周秀娜
Transcriptions
Standard Mandarin
- Hanyu Pinyin: Zhōu Xiùnà
Yue: Cantonese
- Jyutping: Chau^{1} Sau^{3}-na^{4}

Chrissie Chau Sau-na (Chinese: 周秀娜; pinyin: Zhōu Xiùnà; Jyutping: Chau^{1} Sau^{3}-na^{4}) is a Hong Kong actress. Initially a model, Chau gained popularity as a sex symbol after the release of her photo albums in 2009 and 2010. She made her film debut in Womb Ghosts (2009).

== Life and career ==
Chau migrated from Chaozhou to Hong Kong with her family when she was 10. She states that she worked in a fast-food restaurant when she was 15, and then as a shop assistant in Causeway Bay earning HK$3,000 (about US$380) a month.

Chau is Hong Kong's most famous pseudo-model, or lang mo. She began pseudo-modelling after she won the runner-up title in the 2002 Comics Festival 'Game Girl'. She rose to prominence as the poster girl for Slim Beauty slimming boutique. In a TV commercial for the boutique, Chau rips off her clothes, revealing a bikini underneath, to 'stop the traffic' while she crosses the road in the business district of Central. In 2009, she released a limited edition life-sized poster with her likeness– dressed in lingerie– printed on the cover, at HK$560 (about US$72) apiece.

Chrissie Chau was invited as a guest for a talk show at Hong Kong University of Science and Technology in late 2009, as part of a seminar series entitled "Knowledge Unlimited", aimed at widening students' horizons. Chau was invited as a guest to the seminar to discuss "Unscrambling the Chrissie Chau Phenomenon". Chau was interviewed by Professor Li Siu-leung of Lingnan University in front of an audience of 400 students. She was asked a number of philosophical and existential questions, and was criticised for not being able to answer them; The Standard described this as "an old-fashioned ambush". The university was in turn criticised by radio host Eileen Cha for choosing Chau for a seminar series entitled Knowledge Unlimited.

In 2010, Hong Kong actor Anthony Wong openly criticised and ridiculed pseudo-models, specifically Chrissie Chau, calling them brainless and "bimbos". The related controversy led to pseudo-models being banned from a book-fair.

== Controversy ==
In February 2026, Martin Lee Ka-shing, co-chairman of Henderson Land Development, filed a defamation and harassment lawsuit in the High Court of Hong Kong against Chau. Lee alleged that Chau had orchestrated a rumour campaign since 2016 suggesting a romantic or “kept” relationship between them in order to promote her films and public profile. According to the filing, related rumours resurfaced online after the death of Lee’s father, Lee Shau-kee, in March 2025, and expanded to include criminal allegations against Lee, which Lee said caused distress while he was mourning. Lee also alleged that Chau in a June 2025 interview arranged the host Akina Fong to mention the rumours about him; Fong later confirmed that the question to Chau had been discussed in advance. Chau responded that she explicitly denied the rumors in the interview and had never encouraged the belief that the two had any personal relationship.

== Works ==
=== Film ===
Year	English title	Original title	Role	Notes/Ref.
2006	Bet to Basic	打雀英雄傳	Nightclub PR	
2006	Love Undercover 3	新紮師妹3	Model Ming	
2008	Playboy Cops	花花型警	Lam Lon's girlfriend	
2008	Storm Rider – Clash of Evils	風雲決	Bing Ying (Cantonese)	
2008	Nobody's Perfect	絕代雙嬌	Slurpee	
2009	Short of Love	矮仔多情	Lily	
2009	Split Second Murders	死神傻了	Fangmei Fang	
2009	Seven 2 One	關人7事	Chrissie	
2010	Womb Ghosts	惡胎	Zoe Kwok	
2010	The Fantastic Water Babes	出水芙蓉	Brenda	
2010	City Under Siege	全城戒備	Youyou / YoYo	
2010	Perfect Wedding	抱抱俏佳人	Flora	
2010	Vampire Warriors	殭屍新戰士	See / Max	
2010	Marriage with a Liar	婚前試愛	KiKi	
2011	Men Suddenly in Love	猛男滾死隊	Tina	
2011	Beach Spike	熱浪球愛戰	Sharon	
2011	The Killer Who Never Kills	殺手歐陽盆栽	Nana	
2011	Lan Cheow Fong	喜愛夜蒲	Nana	
2011	Hong Kong Ghost Stories	猛鬼愛情故事	Bobo	
2012	Any Other Side	夜店詭談	Amy / Elle	
2012	The Hunter with Blood	獵音師		Short film
2012	Holding Love	HOLD住愛	Fang Meng	
2013	Paper Moon	紙月亮	Shi Qin	
2013	Journey to the West: Conquering the Demons	西遊·降魔篇	Killer 4	
2013	Together	在一起	Biqi / Vicki	
2013	Lift to Hell	電梯驚魂	Bai Jie / Dr. Ye	
2013	Flash Play	致命閃玩	Ade's girlfriend	
2013	Mr. and Mrs. Players	爛滾夫鬥爛滾妻	Wong Jing	
2013	Cold Pupil	冷瞳	Su Yuchen	
2013	Kick Ass Girls 3	爆3俏嬌娃	Poo	
2013	My Beautiful Kingdom	我的美麗王國	Ruo Tong	
2013	The Love Experience	有招沒招之愛情達人	Chi Lei	
2014	The Extreme Fox	非狐外傳	Pian Er	
2014	Are You Ready to Marry Me	我想結婚的時候你在哪	Soo Fei	
2014	Break Up 100	分手100次	Xiao Lan Jiao	
2015	An Inspector Calls	浮華宴	Cindy Cheung	
2015	12 Golden Lucks	12金鴨	Mei	
2015	Forever Love	北京時間		
2016	House of Wolves	惡人谷		Special appearance
2016	iGirl	iGirl 夢情人	001	
2017	The Yuppie Fantasia 3	小男人週記3之吾家有喜		
2017	29+1	29+1	Christy Lan	
2017	Husband Killers	女士復仇		
2018	Concerto of the Bully	大樂師．為愛配樂		
2018	The Leakers	洩密者		
2018	Hotel Soul Good	女皇撞到正		
2018	Master Z: The Ip Man Legacy	叶问外传：张天志	Banana	
2019	Death Notify			
2019	The White Storm 2 - Drug Lords			
2019	P Storm		Natalie Liu	
2019	Atonement			
2019	Prison Flowers			
2019	Magic Circle			
2020	Freak Orb		Mei Mei	
2020	All's Well Ends Well 2020	家有囍事2020	雷夢娜 Lui Mung Na	
2023	Bursting Point	爆裂點	司徒葦 Szeto Wai	Special Appearance
2025	Hit N Fun	臨時決鬥	孫雅雲 Surewin Suen	
2025	Behind the Shadows			

=== Television ===
Year	English title	Original title	Role	Notes
2006	Stephen's Diary	老馮日記	Sharon (ex-girlfriend Sam Lee)	
2013	Romance of Tang′ Kongfu	唐朝浪漫英雄	Tao Yaoyao	
2013	Ip Man	葉問	Jenny	
2013	X-Girl		Sun Xiaomei	
2018	Deep in the Realm of Conscience	宮心計2深宮计	Zheng Chunxi	Special Appearance
2020	WHITE WAR	戰毒	Wong Tsz-kei	1st Female Lead
2020	The Impossible 3	非凡三俠	Keung Bo-yee	1st Female Lead
2021	Ink at Tai Ping	太平紋身店	Nana	1st Female Lead
2022	In the Storm	黑金風暴	Man Ching	1st Female Lead

=== Music video appearances ===
Year	Title
2021	Edan Lui - "小諧星"

== Awards and nominations ==
Year	Award	Category	Nominated work	Result
2011	Accolade Global Film Competition	Award of Merit: Leading Actress	Beach Spike	Won
2012	Macau International Movie Festival	Best Actress	Cold Pupil	Nominated
2013	The Los Angeles Movie Award	Best Actress	Paper Moon	Won
2016	Asian New Media Film Festival	Best Actress	iGirl	Won
2017	China Film Director's Guild Awards	Best Actress	29+1	Nominated
2017	Hong Kong Film Critics Society Awards	Best Actress	29+1	Nominated
2018	37th Hong Kong Film Awards	Best Actress	29+1	Nominated
2018	18th Chinese Film Media Awards	Best Actress	29+1	Nominated
2018	18th Chinese Film Media Awards	Most Popular Actress	29+1	Won
2018	Chinese Film (Ningbo·Cixi) Festival	Best Actress	29+1	Won
2019	Macau International Movie Festival	Best Supporting Actress	P Storm	Nominated
2022	40th Hong Kong Film Awards	Best Actress	Madalena	Nominated
2022	Macau International Movie Festival	Best Actress	Madalena	Nominated
