= Process (Candy Lo album) =

Process!

EP by Candy Lo
- Released: 11 June 2007
- Recorded: Hong Kong
- Genre: C-rock, pop rock, alternative rock
- Label: WOW Music (Chinese release); Avex Trax (Japanese release); Sony Music (Other countries)
- Producer: Candy Lo

Candy Lo chronology
Evolution Theory (2005)	Process! (2007)	L

Process is Hong Kong singer Candy Lo's second extended play.

== Track listing ==
1. 空白 Hung1 Baak6 (Blank Space) - 3:47
2. 圍牆 Wai4 Cheung4 (The Wall)- 4:51
3. 默音 Mak6 Yam1 (Silent Sound) - 03:11
4. 愛到不能 Oi3 Dou3 Bat1 Nang4 (Love to the Limit) - 3:59
5. 千歲 Chin1 Seui3 (1,000 Years Old) - 3:18
6. 沉默不是金 Chén Mò Bù Shì Jīn (Silence Isn't Golden) - 3:13
7. 走慢點 Zǒu Màn Diǎn (Run Slowly) - 5:23
