= Ŭisun =

Korean monk (1786–1866)

Korean name
- Hangul: 의순
- Hanja: 意恂
- RR: Uisun
- MR: Ŭisun

Art name
- Hangul: 초의
- Hanja: 艸衣
- RR: Choui
- MR: Ch'oŭi

Ŭisun (Korean: 의순; Hanja: 意恂; 1786–1866) is often called "The Saint of Korean Tea" or the "Father of Korean Tea". He was a Korean Buddhist Seon (Zen) Master who in the first half of the 19th century introduced the Way of Tea (tea ceremony) and the practices of Buddhism to many aristocratic scholars who were dissatisfied with the rigid neo-Confucianism of the Joseon era. He was himself noted as a calligrapher and artist, as well as a poet, and he formed deep friendships with other famous figures of his time, especially Chŏng Yagyong and Kim Chŏnghŭi.

== Life and career ==
=== Early life ===
He was born in Singi village, Samhyang District, Muan County, in the present-day Jeonnam-Gwangju Special City. His family name was Jang 張, his original name as a monk was Ŭisun (意洵; later he wrote it as 意恂). In his 16th year he became a monk at Unheung-sa Temple (雲興寺) on the slopes of Deokyong-san Mountain in Dado District, Naju County, South Jeolla Province, under the Venerable Byeokbong Minseong (碧峰 敏性). In his 19th year, after an enlightenment experience on Wolchul-san Mountain in Yeong'am, he received ordination from his main master, the Seon (Zen) master Wanho Yunu (玩虎 倫佑) at the temple of Daedun-sa (大芚寺) (now known as Daeheung-sa 大興寺), receiving the name Cho-ui. In addition to scholarly learning, Cho-ui was a skilled painter in both scholarly and Buddhist styles, and a noted performer of Beompae (梵貝) Buddhist ritual song and dance.

=== Relationship Chŏng Yagyong ===
In 1806, he may first have met Tasan Chŏng Yagyong (1763–1836) who was living in exile in his mother's native country of Gangjin, only seven or eight miles away from Daedun-sa, and Dasan's tea companion, the Venerable A'am Hyejang (兒庵 惠藏), the head monk of the nearby temple Baegnyeonsa (白蓮寺). In 1809, he spent several months in Gangjin, learning the I Ching (Book of Changes) and classical Chinese poetry from Dasan. They became very close, despite Dasan being socially superior and a Confucian scholar who had been deeply influenced by the Seohak western learning that included Catholicism. Usually such men had little or no sympathy with Buddhism. It is a testimony to Ch'oŭi's qualities as a scholar that he won the admiration of Chŏng Yagyong and other literati.

=== Meeting with famous scholars in Seoul ===
Cho-ui seems first to have visited Seoul in 1815, but it was during a visit late in 1830 that he became widely recognized and established strong relationships with a number of highly educated scholar-officials, several of whom had been to China, who became his friends and followers. These included the son-in-law of King Jeongjo 正祖 (r. 1776–1800), Haegeo-doin Hong Hyeon-Ju (海居 道人 洪顯周; 1793–1865) and his brother Yeoncheon Hong Seok-Ju (淵泉 洪奭周; 1774–1842), the son of Dasan, Unpo Jeong Hak-Yu (耘 逋 丁學游; 1786–1855), as well as the famous calligrapher Chusa Kim Chŏnghŭi with his brothers Sanchon Kim Myeong-Hui (山泉 金命喜; 1788–1857) and Geummi Kim Sang-Hu (琴糜 金相喜; 1794–1861). It was most unusual for a Buddhist monk, who as such was assigned the lowest rank in society, together with mudangs (巫堂; shaman) and kisaengs, to be recognized as a poet and thinker in this way by members of the Confucian establishment. As a monk, Cho-ui was not allowed to enter the city walls of Seoul and had to receive visits from these scholars while living in the temple Cheongnyangsa (淸涼寺) outside the capital's eastern gate or in a hermitage in the hills to the north.

=== Life in Ilchi-am ===
Once he was in his forties, he withdrew to the mountain above Daedun-sa, in the far south-west region of Korea, built a hermitage known as Ilchi-am (一枝庵) in 1824, and lived there alone for the next forty years, practicing meditation in a manner he developed and wrote about, provoking a methodological dispute that lasted long after his death.

=== Practice of and writings about Seon meditation ===
In the late Joseon period, Korean meditation practice was generally limited to the practice of samatha. Cho-ui's method was known as Chigwan (止觀) "stopping and seeing", a dichotomy of two concepts: samatha and vipaśyanā, concentration and insight. Samatha, often translated as "calm abiding", comprised a style of practices promoting concentration, culminating in a tranquil awareness that can be effortlessly sustained for hours on end. Vipaśyanā was the ensuing practice of insight into the nature of illusion and reality. Thus, samatha was a focusing, strengthening and pacifying concentration used in preparation for vipaśyanā to enhance the revelatory work of insight.

Cho-ui composed a treatise, Seonmun sapyeonmaneo (禪門四辯漫語 Four Defenses and Random Words), to warn monks of a crucial dimension of insight missing from their practice. In the treatise, Ch'oŭi criticized the contemporary meditation master Baekpa Geungseon 白坡 亘璇 (1767–1852) who wrote the Seonmun sugyeong (禪文手鏡) Hand Glass of Seon Literature.

=== Writings about tea ===
In 1828, during a visit to Chilbul-am Hermitage (七佛庵) in Jirisan Mountain, Cho-ui transcribed a Ming Dynasty Chinese text on tea. Two years later on his return to Ilchi-am, he produced the ChaSinJeon (or Dasinjeon) (茶神傳 Chronicle of the Spirit of Tea) as a simple guide to the basic principles involved in making and drinking tea. In 1830, he published a now lost collection of his own poems with prefaces and postscripts by four leading scholar-administrators in which they show their personal interest in Seon (Zen) practice and the drinking of tea. He then returned to his hermitage, where he wrote and painted. In 1837, he composed the DongChaSong (or DongDaSong) (東茶頌 Hymn in Praise of Korean Tea), at the request of Hong Hyeon-Ju. This is the work for which he is most celebrated among lovers of tea in Korea.

In 1838, he climbed to the topmost peak of Mount Kumgang, Biro Peak, before visiting the hills around Seoul. In his fifty-fifth year, he received the title Daegakdeunggyebojejonja Cho-ui DaeJongSa (大覺登階普濟尊者 草衣 大宗 師 the Great Monk Cho-ui, Master of Supreme Enlightenment), from King Heonjong (r 1834–1849). In his 58th year he visited his childhood home and saw his parents' graves covered with weeds, an evocative event he marked in a poem.

=== Visits to Kim Chŏnghŭi in exile ===
From 1840 until 1848, Chusa Kim Chŏnghŭi was exiled to the southern island of Cheju and during those years, Cho-ui visited him no fewer than five times, once staying for six months, teaching him about tea and Buddhism. When Chusa was freed, he visited Ch'oŭi at Ilchi-am as soon as he arrived on the mainland on his way back to Seoul.

=== The last years ===
Kim Chŏnghŭi died and a little later, Cho-ui, already 71, visited his friend's grave near Asan, to the south-west of Seoul. Cho-ui remained vigorous and healthy to the end, all the time practicing Seon meditation. Early in the morning he called his attendant to help him get up, sat in the lotus position and "entered Nirvana" (the term used for the death of a monk.
