= Gim Myeong-hui =

Korean artist (fl. 19th century)

- Hangul: 김명희
- Hanja: 金命喜
- RR: Gim Myeonghui
- MR: Kim Myŏnghŭi

Art name
- Hangul: 산천
- Hanja: 山泉
- RR: Sancheon
- MR: Sanch'ŏn

Courtesy name
- Hangul: 성원
- Hanja: 性源
- RR: Seongwon
- MR: Sŏngwŏn

Gim Myeong-hui (1788–1857), also known as Kim Myeong-hui, was a calligrapher of the late Joseon Dynasty. He was born into a yangban family of the Gyeongju Gim lineage, the son of Gim No-gyeong. He passed the jinsa literary examination in 1810, and entered government service. However, he never rose above the rank of hyeon magistrate. Accompanying his father on a mission to the Qing Dynasty court in 1822, he struck up correspondences with leading Chinese calligraphers of the time, including Liu Xihai (zh:劉喜海).

Gim's elder brother Gim Jeong-hui was also known for his calligraphy.

== See also ==
- Korean culture
- Joseon Dynasty
- Korean calligraphy
