= Fantasy (Candy Lo album) =

Studio album by Candy Lo
- Released: 19 July 2001
- Recorded: Hong Kong
- Genres: C-rock, pop rock, alternative rock, cantopop
- Label: Sony BMG Music Entertainment (Hong Kong)
- Producers: Kubert Leung, Candy Lo

Candy Lo chronology
MUSE (2000)	Fantasy (2001)	Hei Fun Lyun Oi (喜歡戀愛; Like To Love) (2001)

Fantasy is a studio album by Cantopop singer-songwriter Candy Lo, released in 2001. Lo composed six songs on the album, and was involved in its production with Hong Kong producer Kubert Leung. Mark Lui composed "Your Wedding" (Hui Lei Tik Fun Lei), the final track on the album.

== Track listing ==
Title translations in brackets.

1. "刀槍不入" Dou1 Cheung1 Bat1 Yap6 (Rigid Way Of Thinking)
2. "生於和平區" Saang1 Yu1 Wo4 Ping4 Keui1 (Life In A Peaceful Place)
3. "無痛分手" Mou4 Tung3 Fan1 Sau2 (A Painless Break-Up)
4. "吶喊" Naap6 Haam3 (Call)
5. "一個人在途上" Yat1 Go3 Yan4 Joi6 Tou4 Seung5/6 (A Person On The Way Up)
6. "風鈴" Fung1 Ling4 (Wind Chimes)
7. "無題" Mou1 Tai4 (Untitled)
8. "Hello吉蒂" Gat1 Dai3 (Kitty/Lucky Peduncle)
9. "女吸血鬼的情歌" Neui5 Kap1 Hyut3 Gwai2 Dik1 Ching4 Go1 (Female Vampire's Love Song)
10. "半本通書" Bun3 Bun2 Tung1 Syu1 (Half Book Calendar)
11. "去你的婚禮" Heui3 Nei5 Dik1 Fan1 Lai5 (Go To Your Wedding)

== Reception ==
A 2001 New Straits Times review called Fantasy an album that is "full of surprises", saying that "Lo's superb vocals make smooth transitions from soft, soothing to expressionless and hard-hitting".
