= Pseudo-model =

Young models without training

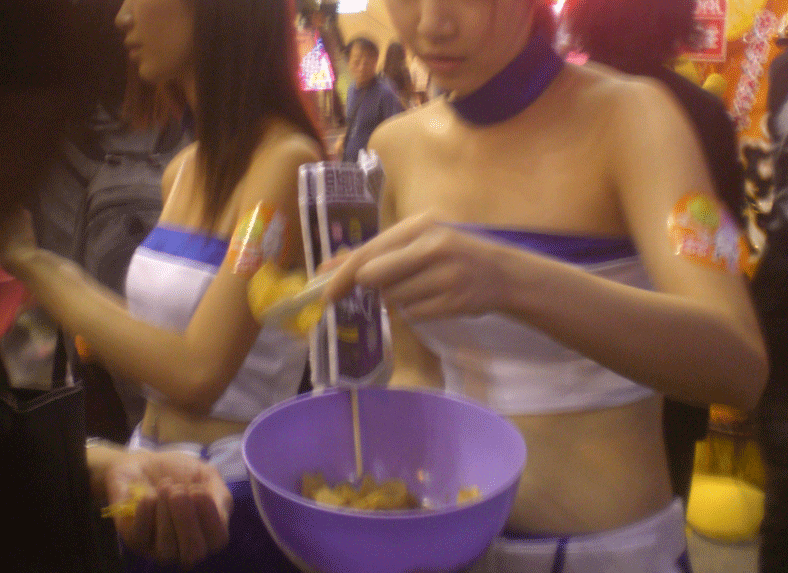
Leng mos in Causeway Bay, Hong Kong

Leng mo (Chinese: 𡃁模), characterised as pseudo-models in English, are young models without training and who do not possess the physical qualities required of high-fashion catwalk models, which usually include a minimum height of 5'9". Leng mo models arose to prominence in Hong Kong in the late 2000s.

Leng mos often work as promotional models at fairs and expositions. They often attract publicity by welcoming photos of them being taken in skimpy outfits such as bikinis. Many publish their own gravure photograph albums.

== Etymology ==
It doesn't matter if she has done any modelling before. What matters is the willingness to display her body - not limited to her cleavage. When a leng mo bends forward in her deep-V tops, she doesn't see the need to use her hands to cover her bosom.

— Jacqueline Pang,
writing in The Standard

Leng mo is a neologism derived from Cantonese slang to describe teenage models without formal training in modeling. The word leng1 (𡃁), written alternatively as "o靚" or "口靚", means "young" or "lacking in maturity" in Cantonese. It is used mainly in Hong Kong and does not exist in Putonghua. "mou4 (模)" simply means "model". The addition of leng to "model" acts as a diminutive, so for example, in English, a similar construction would be the addition of "-ette" to "model" to give "modelette".

The English characterisation of leng mo as pseudo-models first appeared in the South China Morning Post in a story by reporter Vivienne Chow. According to a Hong Kong TV and radio host Jacqueline Pang the typical leng mo is a teenage girl who is prepared to dress (and undress) and "show off her hot body at public functions in a way that, in previous years, could only be seen in adult magazines". According to The Standard, leng mo was the most popular new term in Hong Kong in 2009.

== History ==
During the late 1980s, Hong Kong's modeling industry produced many professional and "proper" models, such as Janet Ma (馬詩慧) and Sophia Kao (aka QiQi 琦琦).

But in the early 2000s, leng mo gradually rose to prominence due primarily to negative media attention. Instead of performing catwalk shows for high fashion, they are hostesses at shows and exhibitions, particularly those promoting video games and electronic products. They soon accrued a large fanbase consisting mainly of young otaku men.

== Hong Kong Book Fair ==
Many have now issued photograph albums, which are launched at book fairs and sold at news stands. These have been generally criticised as "low-class" and "inappropriate". Public figures, notably pundit Chip Tsao, said: "allowing these vulgar photo books to be sold in the book fair reflects a wide spread of stupidity in Hong Kong".

Some web groups such as "public culture protection groups" (公共文化活動關注組) are opposed to the models making appearances in certain places. In July 2009, they complained against the models' appearance at the annual Hong Kong Book Fair and caused a media stir. More than 30,000 signatures were gathered in an online petition against the models. Already mindful about potential disruption to the fair, organisers Hong Kong Trade Development Council dedicated a remote area for those autograph sessions in 2009.

Citing numerous complaints from the previous year, the Trade Development Corporation decided to ban the promotion of leng mo photograph collections at the 2010 Book Fair. They said that they wanted to minimise disruption caused by the presence of these girls publicising their books. The decision was welcomed by 22 parent-teacher groups, Chip Tsao, and Hong Kong actor Anthony Wong. Publishers and the models objected, and many stationed themselves outside the book fair venue, holding autograph sessions. Saying that the organisers could not bar them from entering the exhibition hall, some of the girls challenged the organisers by entering the book fair venue in their capacity as ordinary members of the public. The organisers' attempt to contain the exploits of the leng mo did not succeed from taking away the attention on them.

Following the ban on promotions at the Book Fair, organisers of the annual Animation-Comic-Game Hong Kong also decided to ban pseudo-models from taking part in promotions within their salon. Microsoft, which had engaged Chrissie Chau and Jessica C, was informed that the girls only be allowed to enter the event as visitors, and that promotions must only be held at designated areas "in order to avoid chaos and to ensure visitors' safety".

== Notable models ==
- Chrissie Chau (周秀娜)
