= Kim Chŏnghŭi =

Korean calligrapher (1786–1856)

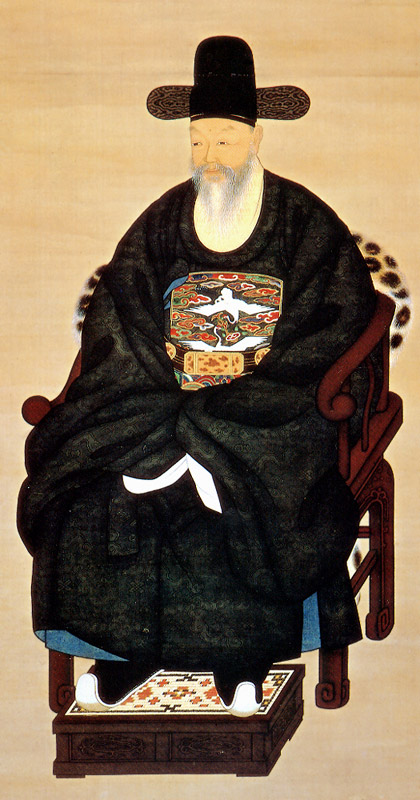

Korean name
- Hangul: 김정희
- Hanja: 金正喜
- RR: Gim Jeonghui
- MR: Kim Chŏnghŭi

Kim Chŏnghŭi (Korean: 김정희; pronounced [kimdʑʌŋçi]; 1786–1856) was one of the most celebrated epigraphists, scholars, and practitioners of calligraphy of Korea's later Joseon period. He was a member of the Gyeongju Kim clan. He used various art names: Wandang (阮堂), Chusa (秋史), Yedang (禮堂), Siam (詩庵), Gwapa (果坡), Nogwa (老果) etc. (up to 503 by some estimates). He is especially celebrated for having transformed Korean epigraphy and for having created the "Chusa-che" (秋史體; lit. 'Chusa writing style') inspired by his study of ancient Korean and Chinese epitaphs. His ink paintings, especially of orchids, are equally admired.

As a scholar, he belonged to the Silhak (Practical Learning) school also known as the Bukhak (北學, "Northern Learning"). He was related to Queen Jeongsun, the second wife of King Yeongjo, and by his adoptive mother, Nam Yang-hong, he was a cousin to Namyeon-gun Yi Gu, who was destined to be the grandfather of King Gojong (高宗, later titled 光武帝 Gwangmu Emperor. 1852–1919). Heungseon Daewongun (興宣大院君, 1820–1898), King Gojong's father who served as his regent and was also a noted calligrapher, was one of Kim's pupils for a while.

== Biography ==
=== Early life ===
Kim was born in the family home in Yesan, now South Chungcheong Province, in 1786. He was the eldest son. His birth father was Kim Nogyŏng (김노경; 金魯敬, 1766–1840); his grandfather was Kim Iju (김이주; 金頤柱, 1730–1797) and his great-grandfather was Kim Hansin (김한신; 金漢藎, 1720–1758) who married the second daughter of King Yeongjo, the Princess Hwasun (和順翁主, 1720–1758). His ancestors and relatives held many high administrative positions and several were noted for their calligraphy. His mother was a member of the Gigye Yu clan, a daughter of Yu Chunju (兪駿柱), the governor of Gimhae.

He is reputed to have been a remarkable calligrapher already as a child. When he was 7, the famed scholar Chae Chegong (蔡濟恭, 1720–1799) is said to have been impressed on seeing the "Ipchun Daegil Cheonha Daepyeongchun" (立春大吉 天下太平春) good-luck charm marking the coming of spring that he had written, pasted on the gate of the family home. From the age of 15 he received instruction from the celebrated Bukhak (北學, "Northern Learning") scholar Pak Je-ga (朴齊家, 1750–1805).

=== Early youth ===
In the 1790s, the head of the family, his eldest uncle, Kim Noyŏng (김노영; 金魯永, 1747–1707), was sent into exile, while another uncle as well as his grandparents all died in quick succession. It was decided that Kim Chŏnghŭi should be adopted by Kim Noyŏng (who had several daughters but no son) and so become the next head of the family. When he was 15, in 1800, he married a member of the Hansan Yi clan (閑山李氏). That same year, King Jeongjo died and Queen Jeongsun, the widow of the previous King Yeongjo, became regent, since the new king was only a child. Kim Chŏnghŭi's birth father benefitted from the family's relationship with the regent and was raised to a high rank.

=== Later youth ===
Kim Chŏnghŭi's birth mother died in 1801, aged only 34. Queen Jeongsun died in 1805, and Kim Chŏnghŭi's young wife died only a few weeks after her. His teacher Pak Je-ga also died that year and these multiple deaths seem to have encouraged his already deep interest in Buddhism as a source of consolation and meaning. His adoptive mother also died at around this time and once mourning for her was over, he married a slightly younger second wife in 1808, a member of the Yean Yi clan (禮安 李氏). In 1809 he took first place in the lower Gwageo civil examination.

=== Visit to China ===
In 1810, his birth-father was appointed a vice-envoy in the annual embassy to Qing China and he accompanied him, spending some 6 months in China. There he met such noted scholars as Weng Fanggang (翁方綱, 1733–1818) and Ruan Yuan (阮元, 1764–1849) who recognized his qualities. He seems to have studied documentary history there especially. Ruan Yuan gave him a copy of his "Su Zhai Biji" (蘇齋筆記), a book about calligraphy, and Kim continued to correspond with them after his return to Korea. For a time after returning home he did not take up any official position but continued to study the Northern Learning and write essays criticizing rigid Neo-Confucianism.

He also pursued research by visiting and studying the inscriptions on ancient stele. In 1815, the Venerable Cho-ui first visited Seoul and met Kim Chŏnghŭi there. This was the beginning of a deep and lasting relationship. Perhaps it was from this time that Kim began to drink tea, there is no knowing.

=== Success in national exams ===
Passing the gwageo national exam held to mark an eclipse year in 1819, he rose to such positions as secret inspector and tutor to the Crown Prince. Following the death of the prince, power passed to the conservative Andong Kim clan and Kim was reduced in rank while his adoptive father was exiled for several years, until 1834. In 1835, after the accession of King Heonjong, the family's fortunes turned and Kim Chŏnghŭi rose to ministerial rank. In the same year he visited the Ven. Cho-ui at Daedun-sa temple (大芚寺), now called Daeheung-sa).

=== Exile ===
Following the death of King Sunjo of Joseon (r. 1800–1834) late in 1834, Queen Sunwon, the wife of Sunjo and a member of the Kim clan of Andong, held immense power after her grandson, Heonjong (憲宗, 1827–1849 ), still only a child, was made king. Queen Kim acted as his regent. Factional in-fighting increased and in 1840, when he was due to be a member of the Chinese embassy, Kim Chŏnghŭi was instead condemned to exile in Jeju Island. Late in 1842, his wife died. He was finally allowed to return home early in 1849. It was during those years in exile that he developed the calligraphic style known as the "Chusa style", based on his studies of models dating back to the earliest periods of Korean and Chinese history. On his way into exile and on his way back home afterward, he visited the Venerable Cho-ui in his Ilchi-am hermitage at what is now known as Daeheung-sa temple. Cho-ui consecrated several of his building projects in the temple to helping sustain Kim during his exile and visited him in Jeju-do 5-6 times, bringing him gifts of tea.

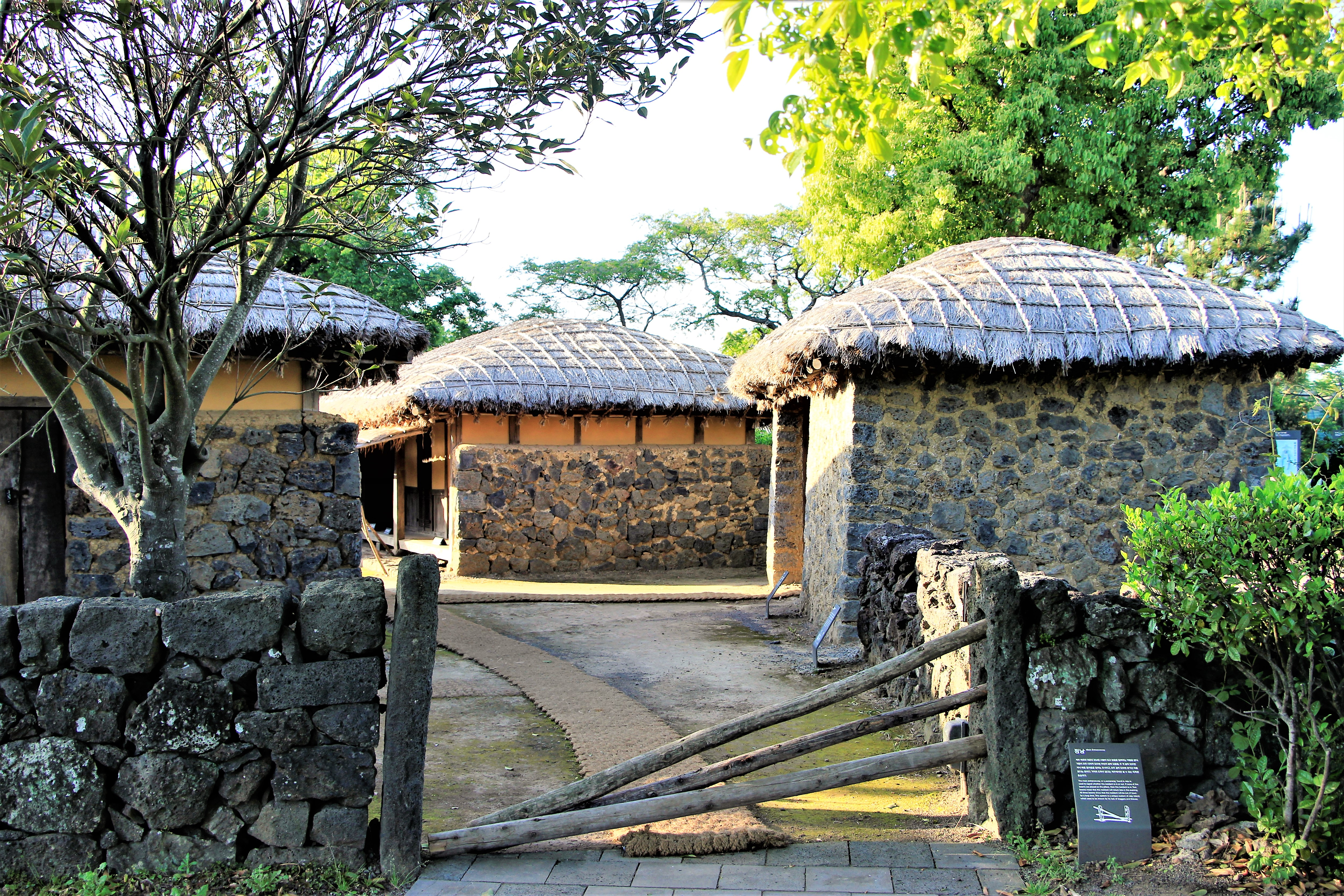
Kim's home in Jeju (2023)

In 1844, during his exile in Jeju Island, he produced his most celebrated ink painting, usually known as "Sehando" or "Wandang Sehando" (阮堂歲寒圖, 'Wandang' was one of Kim's most frequently used 'Ho' names; 'Sehan' means 'the bitter cold around the lunar new year,' 'do' means 'painting'), which he gave to his disciple Yi Sangjŏk (이상적; 李尙迪, 1804–1865) in gratitude for his friendship, which included bringing him precious books from China. The painting shows a simple house, barely outlined, framed by two gnarled pine trees. Beside it there are texts expressing gratitude to Yi Sangjŏk. Yi was an outstanding figure, a poet and calligrapher who went 12 times to China and was greatly admired by the scholars he met there. In 1845, Yi returned to China with the painting, which he showed to the scholars he met. Sixteen of them composed appreciatiative colophons which were attached to the left side of the painting, creating a lengthy scroll. After Yi's return to Korea, some Korean scholars also added their tributes, creating a unique cumulative work combining painting, poetic writing and calligraphy.

Soon after King Heonjong in 1849, there were disputes over the relocation of his tomb, in which a friend of Kim Chŏnghŭi, Gwon Don-in, was involved. as a result, both were sent into exile, Kim spending the years 1850–2 in Bukcheong, Hamgyeong-do province, far in the North.

== Final years ==
After the northern exile, he settled in Gwacheon (to the south of Seoul, where his birth father was buried) in a house he called Gwaji Chodang (瓜地草堂). In 1856 he went to stay for a while in Bongeun-sa temple, in what is now Seoul's Gangnam area, and is said to have become a monk. Later that same year he returned to his home in Gwacheon, and continued to write until the day before he died.

In the years following his death, his disciple Nam Byeong-gil and others prepared and published collections of his letters (Wandang Cheokdok 阮堂尺牘) and of his poems (Damyeon Jaesigo 覃糧齋詩藁) in 1867; a collection of his other writings (Wandangjip 阮堂集) was published in 1868. A complete edition of his works, (Wandang Seonsaeng Jeonjip 阮堂先生全集), was published by his great-great-grandson Kim Ikhwan (김익환; 金翊煥) in 1934.

== Achievements ==
The influence of Kim Chŏnghŭi among the Korean scholars of the later 19th century was immense. He was reputed to have taught 3,000 of them and was seen as the leader of a modernizing trend that developed into the Gaehwapa Enlightenment Party at the end of the 19th century. Among the names associated with him we find Sin Wi (신위; 申緯, 1769–1845), O Kyŏngsŏk (오경석; 吳慶錫, 1831–1879), Min Taeho (민태호; 閔台鎬, 1834–1884), Min Kyuho (민규호; 閔奎鎬, 1836–1878), Gang Wi (강위; 姜瑋, 1820–1884).

His main scholarly interest was in documentary history and monumental inscriptions. He maintained correspondence on these topics with major scholars in China. He was particularly celebrated for having deciphered and identified the stele on Mount Bukhan commemorating a visit by King Jinheung of Silla (540–576). He is remembered for his outstanding achievements in calligraphy, ink painting, as well as his writings in prose and poetry. He was in the habit of devising a special Ho (pen-name) for himself whenever he dedicated a painting of orchids to an acquaintance, so that he became the person of his generation with the most such names.

== Buddhism ==
It seems that Kim Chŏnghŭi was accustomed to frequenting Buddhist temples from his childhood onward. There are indications that the sudden death in or around 1805 of several of those he had been close to drove him to deepen his Buddhist practice. Among his calligraphic work, a number of copies of Buddhist Sūtras and other texts survive and he wrote name boards for halls in Daeheung-sa, Bongeun-sa and other temples. The reformists of the Practical Learning tradition often showed an interest in either Catholicism or Buddhism, as part of their reaction against the rigidly secular Neo-Confucianist philosophy.

He was especially close to the Ven. Cho-ui Seonsa (草衣禪師, Uiseon (意恂, 1786–1866) and Baekpa Daesa (白坡大師, Geungseon 亘璇, 1767–1852).

In 1815, Cho-ui first visited Seoul and established strong relationships with a number of highly educated scholar-officials, several of whom had been to China, who became his friends and followers. These included the son-in-law of King Jeongjo (正祖 r. 1776–1800), Haegeo-doin Hong Hyeon-Ju 海居 道人 洪顯周 (1793–1865) and his brother Yeoncheon Hong Seok-Ju 淵泉 洪奭周 (1774–1842), the son of Chŏng Yagyong, Jeong Hak-Yu 耘逋 丁學游 (1786–1855), as well as Kim Chŏnghŭi and his brothers Kim Myeong-hui (1788–1857) and Kim Sang-hu (金相喜) (1794–1861). It was most unusual for a Buddhist monk, who as such was assigned the lowest rank in society, to be recognized as a poet and thinker in this way by members of the Confucian establishment. As a monk, Cho-ui was not allowed to enter the city walls of Seoul and had to receive visits from these scholars while living in Cheongnyangsa temple 淸涼寺 outside the capital's eastern gate or in a hermitage in the hills to the north.

Kim Chŏnghŭi had initiated a controversy with the other celebrated Seon Master Baekpa Geungseon (白坡 亘璇, 1767–1852) who had written the Seonmun sugyeong (禪文手鏡 Hand Glass of Seon Literature). In his Baekpa Mangjeungsipojo (白坡 妄證十五條 Fifteen Signs of Baekpa's Senility), Kim wrote, "The truth of Seon is like a light new dress without stitching, just like a heavenly dress. But the dress is patched and repatched by the inventiveness of humans, and so becomes a wornout piece of clothing." Baekpa had written that certain traditions were superior to others, and Kim considered such quibbles to be a waste of time as well as a misunderstanding of the nature of Seon. Nonetheless, when Baekpa died at Hwaeom-sa Temple in 1852, Kim wrote an epitaph for him: 華嚴宗主白坡大律師大機大用之碑.[6]

== Family ==
Parents

- Biological father: Kim Nokyŏng (김노경)
- Biological mother: Daughter of Yu Chunju (유준주)
  - Brother: Kim Myŏnghŭi (김명희)
  - Brother: Kim Sanghŭi (김상희)
- Adoptive father: Kim Noyŏng (김노영)
- Adoptive mother: Daughter of Hong Taehyŏn (홍대현)

Wives and issues:

- Lady Yi, of the Hansan Yi clan (한산이씨)
  - Kim Sangmu (김상무), adopted son
- Lady Yi, the Yean Yi clan (예안 이씨)
- Lady Han, of the Han clan (한씨)
  - Kim Sangu (김상우), first son

== Gallery ==
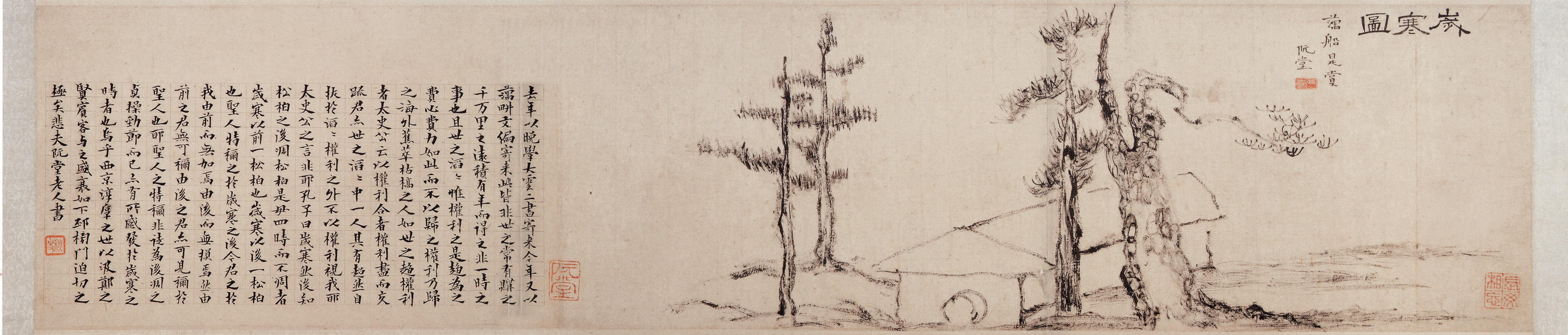

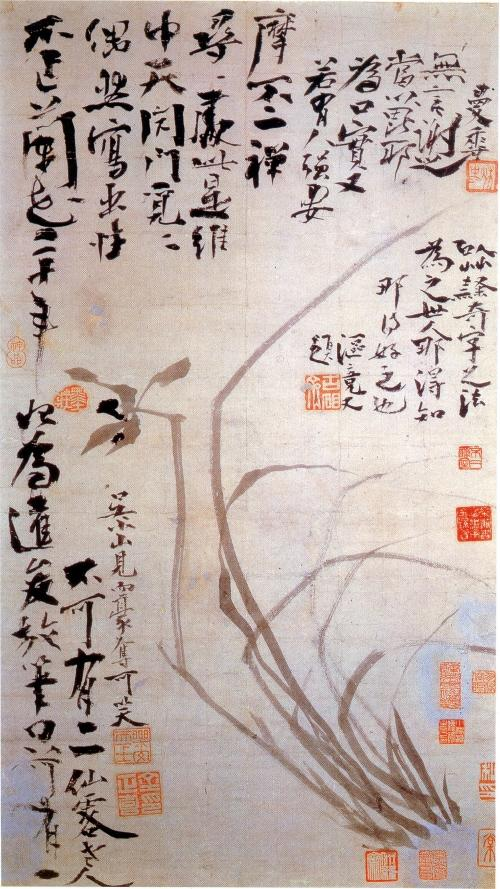

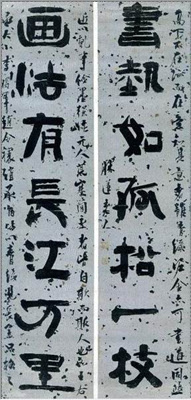

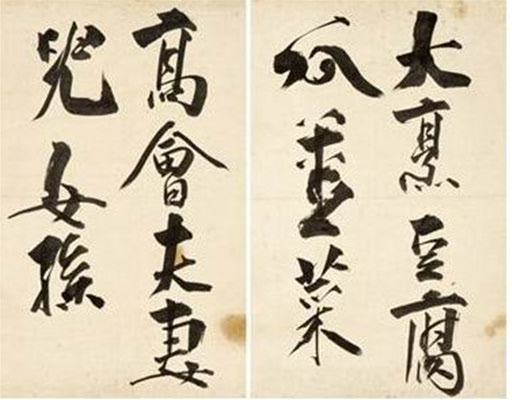

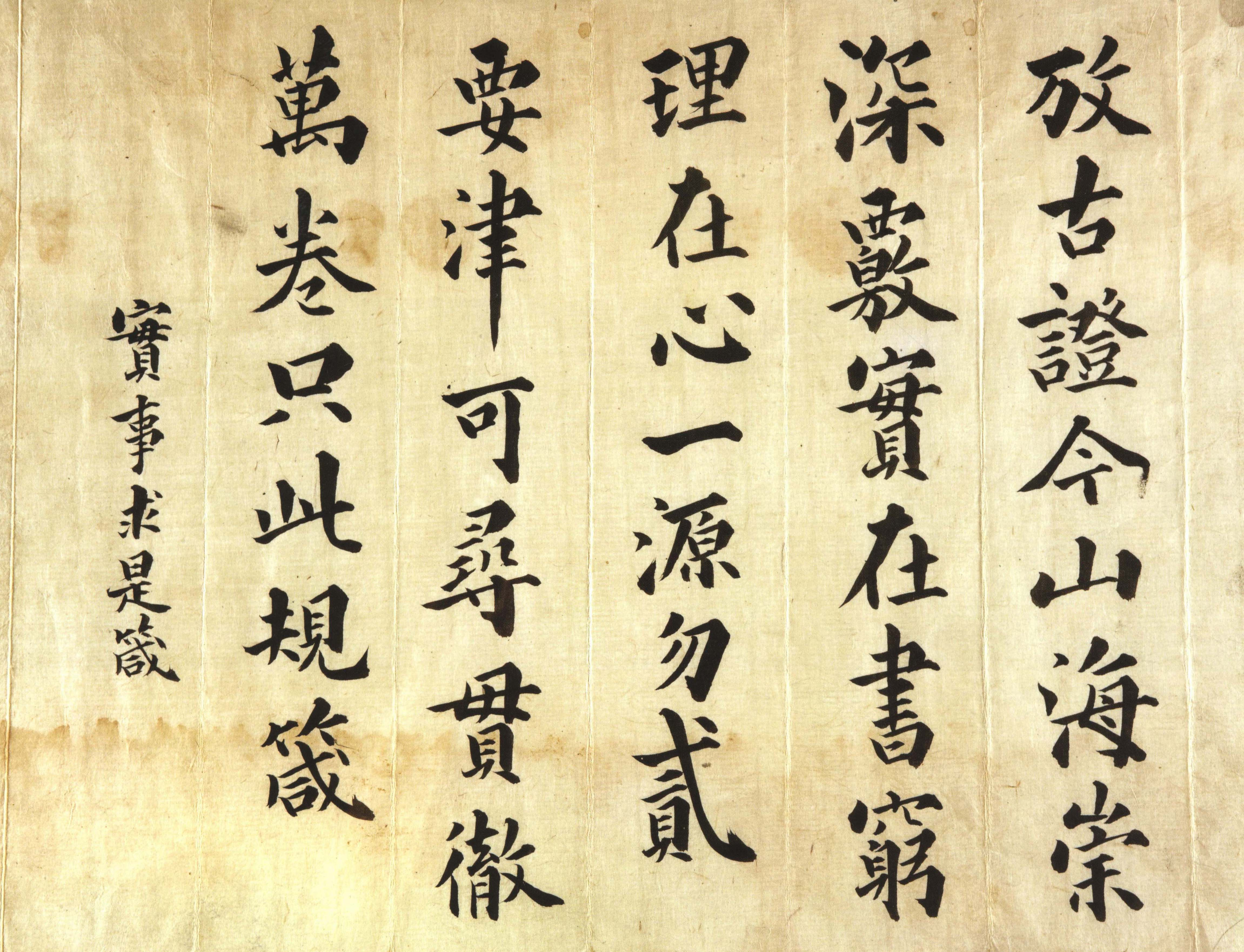

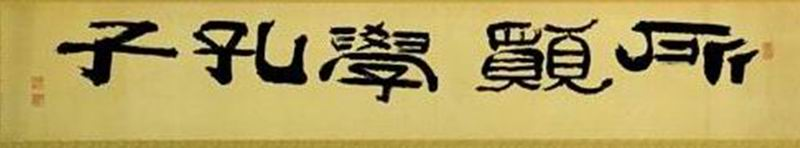

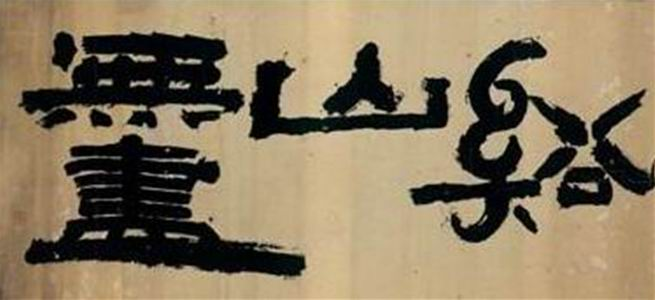

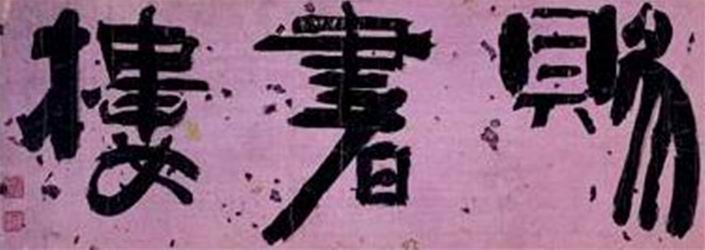

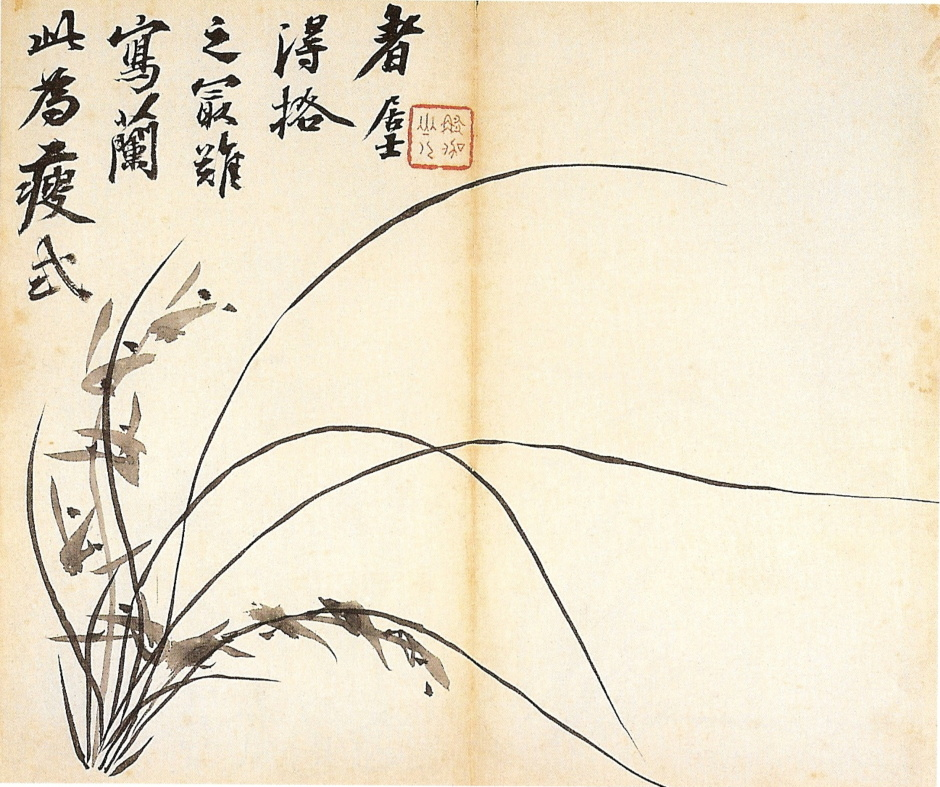
