= Korean calligraphy =

Korean tradition of artistic writing

- Hangul: 서예
- Hanja: 書藝
- RR: seoye
- MR: sŏye

Korean calligraphy, also known as Seoye (Korean: 서예), is the Korean tradition of artistic writing. Calligraphy in Korean culture involves both Hanja (Chinese logograph) and Hangul (Korean native alphabet).

Early Korean calligraphy was exclusively in Hanja, or the Chinese-based logography first used to write the Korean language. During the Goryeo and Joseon dynasties, utilitarian objects were often inscribed with calligraphy such as brush stands, padlocks, incense burners, porcelain, lacquer, and branding irons. Even after the invention of the Korean alphabet Hangul in 1443, Korean calligraphers preferred Chinese characters as they saw it as more prestigious. Hanja continued to be used as the official script until the late 19th century. This changed when both North Korea and South Korea, after their split, separately institutionalized Hangul as the official orthography of Korean. Today many calligraphers, particularly in South Korea, are experimenting with new styles of Hangul, which has become an important part of the larger practice of Korean calligraphy.

== History ==
Chinese calligraphy was introduced to Korea as early as the 2nd or 3rd century CE, and became popular in the 7th century. In the 8th century, Kim Saeng became known as the earliest Korean calligraphic master, producing work that was compared with that of master Chinese calligrapher Wang Xizhi. In the 9th century, poet Ch'oe Ch'i-wŏn became known for his calligraphy both in his home country Silla and in the Tang Dynasty, where he worked and studied.

The angular calligraphy styles of the early Tang masters, Yu Shinan, Ouyang Xun, and Yan Zhenqing, persisted in popularity until the 14th century, when the more rounded style of Zhao Mengfu came into vogue. Korean calligraphy became increasingly formalistic in the years that followed. Gim Jeong-hui (김정희, 金正喜, (1786–1856), also known as Kim Jeong-hui, is considered the greatest calligrapher in the Joseon dynasty, and he was also a scholar-official, painter, epigrapher, and practicing Buddhist. He was a master of many calligraphic forms but is most famous for Chusache, the bold, freeform style he perfected while in exile on Jeju Island. He is known as the chusa style after his pen name 秋史, inspired by the ancient Chinese lishu script.

As the scholarly classes used Chinese characters, Korean calligraphy used hanja until the 1910–1945 Japanese occupation of Korea. Nationalist sentiment led to the popularization of the native hangul alphabet, and calligraphic works using hangul have since seen a revival, although hanja calligraphy is still popular today.

The Korean calligraphy is developing its own style, steadfastly. Fonts that are not square are being developed, considering jong-sung, or sound coming after the vowel.

== Types ==
There are five major types of Korean Hanja calligraphy, which are derived from Chinese calligraphy.

- Seal scripts (Korean: 전서; Hanja: 篆書; RR: jeonseo) are scripts featuring uniformity of stroke thickness and spacing of vertical, horizontal, and curved lines. It is often use for seals and chops.
- Cursive or grass script (초서; 草書; choseo) is known for extreme economy in individual pen strokes. Extreme cursive script is not legible for most people because different characters may resemble each other when written in cursive script.
- Block script (해서; 楷書; haeseo) Each block script character is roughly the same size proportion and fitted into a square space. Chinese characters are frequently written in block script.
- Semi-cursive script (행서; 行書; haengseo) is a practical style intermediate between block and cursive script. It is legible for most people.
- Official script (예서; 隸書; yeseo) was developed from seal script form. It is angular in appearance and much more legible than cursive or seal script.

There are three major types of Korean Hangul calligraphy.

- Palace style (궁체; 宮體; gungche) was developed by and standardized by palace maids (궁녀; 宮女; gungnyo）out of a need for uniformity for ease of communication. There are three main subtypes of gungche: regular(정자; 正字; jeongja), semi-cursive(반흘림; 半흘림; ban hullim), full-cursive(진흘림; 眞흘림; jin hullim).
- Woodblock style (판본체; 版本體; panbonche) resembles Hangul from woodblock prints, such as in the Hunminjeongeum.
- Folk style (민체; 民體; minche) resembles the style of commoners at the time. It was relatively less standardized than the other two styles.

== Gallery ==
Examples of Korean calligraphy
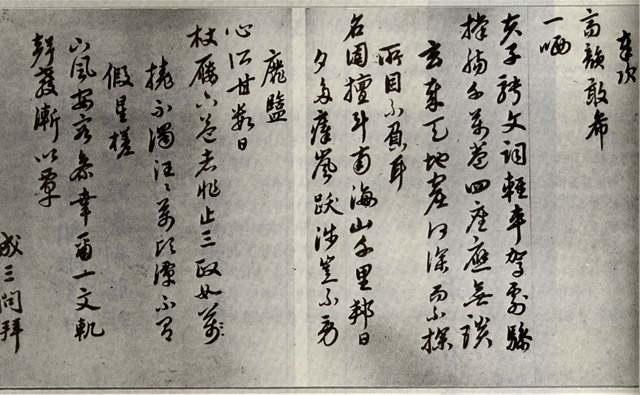
Calligraphy by scholar-official Sŏng Sammun (1418–1456).

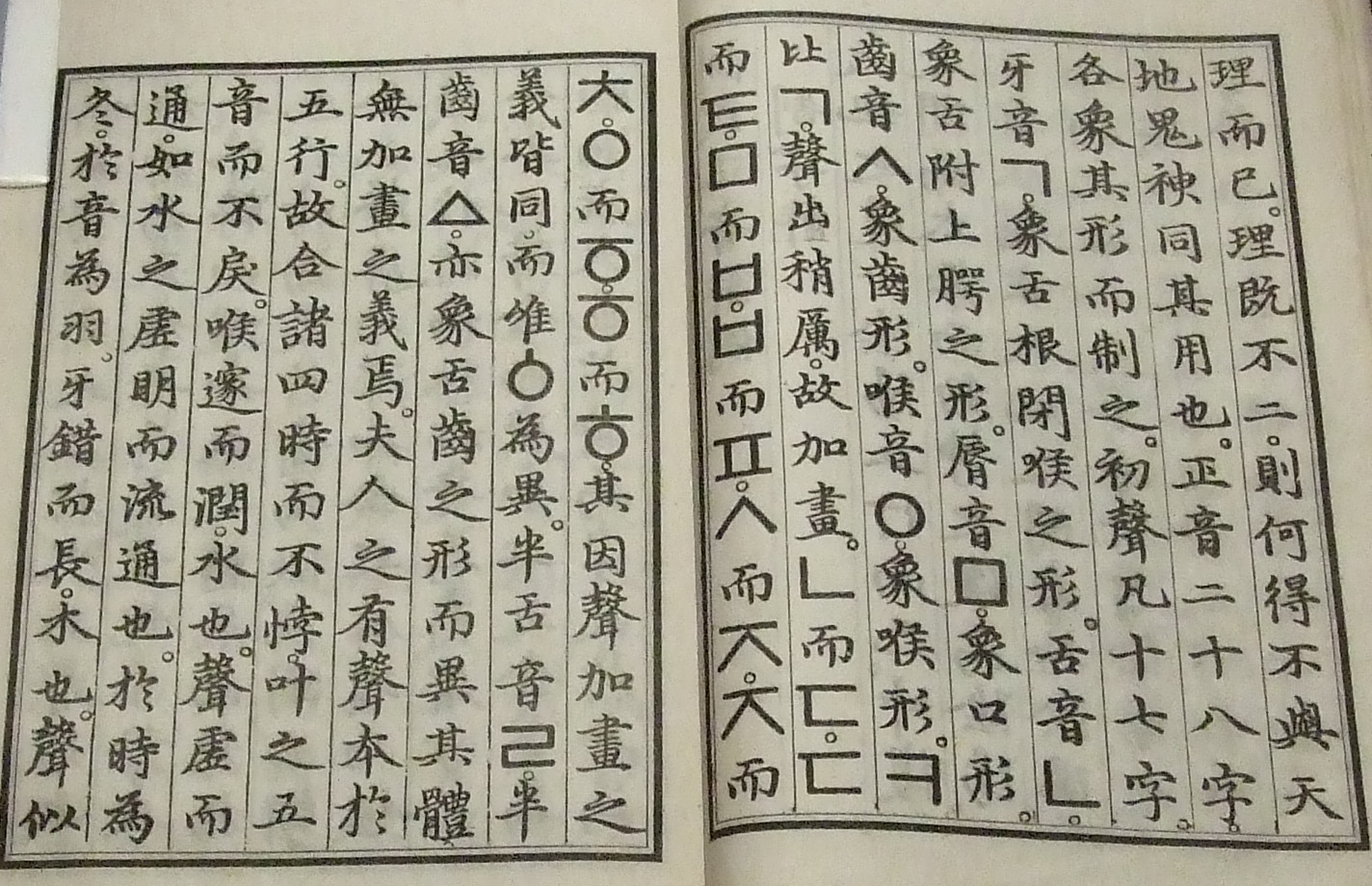
Korean mixed script calligraphy in a replica of the Hunminjeongeum Haerye (1446).

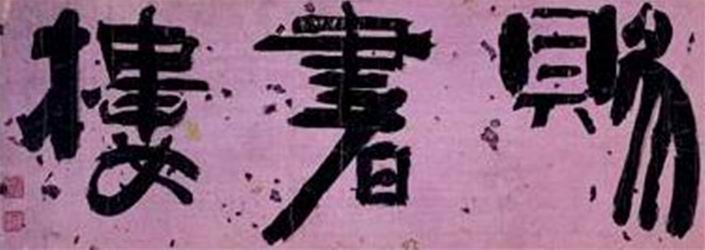
Calligraphy by one of Korea's most celebrated calligraphists, Kim Jeong-hui (1786–1856).

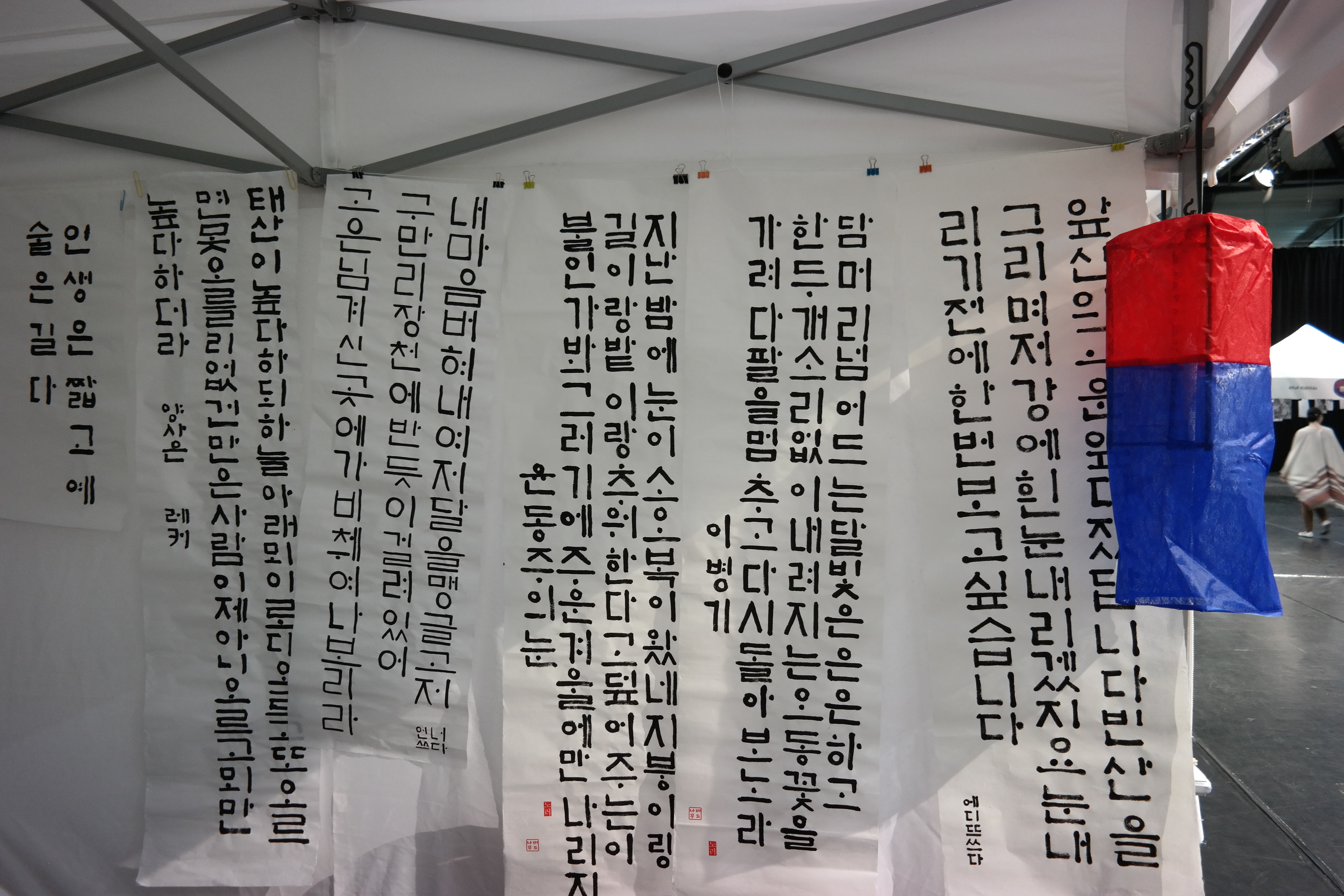
Korean calligraphy written in Hangul.

== See also ==
- Symbols of the Workers' Party of Korea
