= Philip Ng =

American actor

- 伍允龍
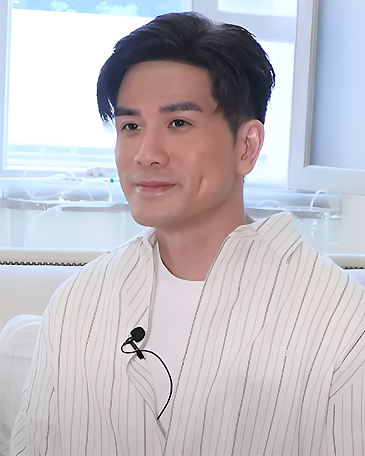
- Ng in 2024
- Born: September 16, 1977 (age 48); British Hong Kong
- Citizenship: American
- Occupations: Actor; martial artist; action choreographer
- Years active: 2001–present

Chinese name
- Traditional Chinese: 伍允龍
- Simplified Chinese: 伍允龙
Transcriptions
Yue: Cantonese
- Jyutping: ng5 wan5lung4
- Website: www.alivenotdead.com/philipng

Philip Ng Wan-lung (simplified Chinese: 伍允龙; traditional Chinese: 伍允龍; pinyin: Wǔ Yǔnlóng; Jyutping: ng5 wan5lung4; born September 16, 1977) is a Hong Kong-born actor, martial artist and action choreographer. He is currently based in Hong Kong.

== Early life ==
Born in Hong Kong on September 16, 1977. Ng's father is Sam Ng. Ng's mother is Frances Ng. Ng immigrated to United States with his family at the age of seven. Ng spent the majority of his youth in Chicago, Illinois.

== Career ==
=== Martial arts ===
Ng began his study of the martial arts with Hung Gar, taught by his uncle and Choy Lay Fut, taught by his father. At the age of 13, Philip Ng began his study of Wing Chun Gung Fu with his uncle, Alan Ang, and Taekwondo with Master Woon S. Shim.

To further his education in the field of Wing Chun Gung Fu, Ng traveled to Hong Kong during the summers and became the student of the Wong Shun-leung, with whom he trained until Wong's passing early in 1997. Before his death, Sifu Wong Shun-leung encouraged Ng to begin instructing students in America to become training partners.

Ng founded the Illini Wing Chun Association at the University of Illinois at Urbana-Champaign. Ng spent five years presiding over the association as both the head instructor and club president. Time spent at the university had not only awarded Philip a master's degree in education, but training and sparring with other martial stylists gained him the knowledge and applicable skill in the arts of Brazilian Jiu-Jitsu, Western Boxing, Muay Thai and Eskrima. Ng holds a bachelor's degree in Graphic design and a master's degree in education.

=== Acting and choreography ===
Ng returned to Hong Kong in 2002 to pursue a career in acting and martial arts choreography in film and television. In addition to acting, Ng is also a fight choreographer and action director. He taught school for a year and decided to fulfill his dream of performing in a martial arts film. He quit his job and headed to Hong Kong to try to enter the business. He was introduced to Chin Ka Lok, an action director who needed someone with Ng's background to train the actors and became the assistant martial arts choreographer on a film. Ng worked his way up as a stuntman and featured actor until he achieved his goal of starring in a 2014 martial arts film, Once Upon a Time in Shanghai. He was selected to play Bruce Lee in the 2016 biographical film Birth of the Dragon, which premiered at the Toronto Film Festival on September 13, 2016.

== Filmography ==
Film

Year	Title	Role	Notes
TBA	Without Remorse		Filming
2025	The Sixth Robber	Wu Shengli	
2025	Fight Against Evil 3	Fishmonger	
2025	Against All Odds	Dan Dao	
2025	Hit N Fun	Tank Wong (王十)	
2024	Second Life	A Gui	
2024	Stuntman	Leung Chi Wai	
2024	Twilight of the Warriors: Walled In	King (王九)	
2020	Enter the Fat Dragon	Jack	
2019	Undercover Punch and Gun	Xiao Wu	
2019	The Sexy Guys		
2017	Chasing the Dragon	Wai Man	
2017	Colour of the Game		
2016	Birth of the Dragon	Bruce Lee	
2015	Wild City		
2014	Zombie Fight Club	Jason Wu	
2014	Sifu vs Vampire (天師鬥殭屍)	奶油豬	
2014	From Vegas to Macau (賭城風雲)	Lionel	
2014	Once Upon a Time in Shanghai (惡戰)	Ma Yongzhen (馬永貞)	
2013	Princess and the Seven Kung Fu Masters (笑功震武林)	Lok Tin	
2013	Young & Dangerous: Reloaded (古惑仔:江湖新秩序)	Big Head (大頭仔)	
2012	Naked Soldier (絕色武器)	Black Dragon	
2012	Mr. & Mrs Gambler (爛賭夫鬥爛賭妻)	Sam Wong	
2011	Big Blue Lake (大藍湖)	Drama Show Director	guest appearance
2011	Treasure Hunt (無價之寶)	Tiger (東方虎)	guest appearance
2011	Beach Spike (熱浪球愛戰)	Coach	
2011	Treasure Inn (財神客棧)	Eagle King	
2009	Bodyguards and Assassins (十月圍城)	Assassin	
2009	Somebody to Love	Jeff	Short Film
2009	Tactical Unit - Human Nature (機動部隊-人性)	Fire	
2008	Sixth Floor Rear Flat 2: Happy Funeral (六樓后座2)	Pete	
2008	Playboy Cops (花花型警)	Robber	guest appearance
2007	Invisible Target (男兒本色)	Tiger	
2007	Love Is Not All Around (十分愛)	Micheal	
2007	Hui Lu (Irreversi)	John Wei	
2006	Undercover Hidden Dragon (至尊無賴)	Hung Fei	
2006	Marriage with a Fool (獨家試愛)	Philip	
2005	Dragon Squad (猛龍)	Lee Chun Pei	
2005	Fight For Love (擊情歲月)	Hoi Tung (teenage)	
2005	House of Fury (精武家庭)	King	
2004	Enter the Phoenix (大佬愛美麗)	Bo	
2004	New Police Story (新警察故事)	Philip (Wing's team member)	
2003	The Twins Effect (千機變)	Vampire	
2001	Born Wild (野獸之瞳)	Thung	

Television

Year	Title	Role	Notes
2022	The Righteous Fists	Ye Loi Gat 夜來吉	
2018	Fist Fight	Ho Tit Nam (Iron) 何鐵男	
2018	The Great Adventurer Wesley		
2016	A Fist Within Four Walls (城寨英雄)	Lung Shing-fu (龍成虎)	
2012	Elite Brigade II (火速救兵II)	Tai Wai-hin 戴偉軒	
2012	Kung Fu Quest II (功夫傳奇II)	Host	RTHK documentary
2011	Elite Brigade (火速救兵)	Dee	
2010	Kung Fu Quest (功夫傳奇)	Host	RTHK documentary - http://www.rthk.org.hk/special/kungfuquest/
2007	Wing Chun (詠春)	Chan Wah Shun	
2004	Dragonfly: Invincible (天下無敵)	Leo	
2004	Made In Hong Kong	Main subject/actor	American Movie Classic documentary/drama

Second Unit Director or assistant director:

Year	Title	Role
2016	Undercover Punch and Gun (潛龍狙擊)	action director
2014	Sifu vs. Vampire (天師鬥殭屍)	action director
2014	Flirting in the Air (唐伯虎衝上雲霄)	action director
2014	Zombie Fight Club	action director
2013	Young & Dangerous: Reloaded (古惑仔:江湖新秩序)	action director
2011	Bloodtraffick	action director
2009	Mr. & Mrs. Kok (神探妙夫妻)	action director
2008	Kinta 1881	martial arts choreographer
2005	Dragon Squad (猛龍)	martial arts choreographer
2005	Mulawin: The Movie	martial arts choreographer
2003	Star Runner (少年阿虎)	martial arts choreographer
