= Song of the Sky Pacers =

Medieval Chinese star catalogue

The Song of the Sky Pacers (Chinese: 步天歌 Bùtiāngē ; Korean: 보천가 Bocheon'ga) is an early Chinese star catalogue in the form of poem in heptasyllabic verse, enumerating the names of stars.

The poem exists in several revision, the oldest probably written in 7th or 8th century Korea, during the late Goguryeo or the North–South States Period. It is attributed to either Danyuanzi (丹元子, 단원자, Danweonja, Sui dynasty) or to Wang Ximing (王希明, 왕희명, Wang Heuimyeong, Tang dynasty). This early version is also known as the Ancient Song of the Sky Pacers (舊法步天歌, 구법보천가, Gubeop Bocheon'ga) for disambiguation.

In late Joseon era Korea (18th century) a revised version of the poem was composed, motivated by new knowledge on Chinese asterisms imported during the Qing dynasty (which was itself based on the knowledge of the southern sky acquired from European contact in the Ming period).

But there remained disagreement between the song and the star-charts used by the Royal Observatory (觀象監, 관상감, Gwansanggam). This caused confusion, especially in the national examinations for selecting new astronomers. To resolve this situation, the Royal Observatory commissioned a Song of the Sky Pacers, Adapted to New Methods (新法步天歌, 신법보천가, Shinbeop Bocheon'ga; also known as the New Song of the Sky Pacers) based upon star-charts and song of the Sequel of the I-Hsiang-K'ao-ch'eng (欽定儀象考成續編, an astronomical work written in 1744 by German Jesuit Ignaz Kögler).

This New Song was edited by middle-class professional astronomer Yi Jun-yang (李俊養, 이준양), and corrected by nobleman Nam Byeong-gil.

== See also ==
- Chinese star maps
- Chinese-language literature of Korea
