= Twilight of the Warriors: Walled In =

2024 Hong Kong film by Soi Cheang

- Theatrical release poster
- Traditional Chinese: 九龍城寨之圍城
- Simplified Chinese: 九龙城寨之围城
- Hanyu Pinyin: Jiǔ Lóng Chéng Zhài Zhī Wéi Chéng
- Jyutping: Gau^{2} Lung^{4} Sing^{4} Zaai^{6} Zi^{1} Wai^{4} Sing^{4}
- Directed by: Soi Cheang
- Screenplay by: Au Kin-yee; Shum Kwan-sin; Chan Taili; Lai Chun
- Based on: City of Darkness by Yuyi
- Produced by: John Chong; Wilson Yip
- Starring: Louis Koo; Sammo Hung; Richie Jen; Raymond Lam; Terrance Lau; Kenny Wong; Philip Ng; Tony Wu; German Cheung
- Cinematography: Cheng Siu-keung
- Edited by: Cheung Ka-fai
- Music by: Kenji Kawai
- Production companies: Media Asia Films; Entertaining Power; One Cool Film Production Limited; Sil-Metropole Organisation; Lian Ray Pictures; HG Entertainment
- Distributed by: Media Asia Distribution
- Release date: 1 May 2024
- Running time: 126 minutes
- Country: Hong Kong
- Languages: Cantonese; Japanese
- Budget: HK$300 million(~US$39 million)
- Box office: US$111.5 million (Note: See Box office)

Twilight of the Warriors: Walled In (Chinese: 九龍城寨之圍城; lit. 'The Siege of Kowloon Walled City') is a 2024 Hong Kong action film directed by Soi Cheang, and starring Louis Koo, Sammo Hung, Richie Jen, Raymond Lam, Terrance Lau, Kenny Wong, Philip Ng, Tony Wu and German Cheung. The film was based on the novel City of Darkness by Yuyi and the manhua of the same name by Andy Seto.

Having been in development since the 2000s, production for the film officially began in November 2021 and wrapped in April 2022. The film was released in Hong Kong and mainland China on 1 May 2024, and was selected to be in the Official Selection (Midnight Screening) of the 2024 Cannes Film Festival, as part of screened out of competition. The film received critical acclaim.

The film became the second-highest-grossing domestic film of all time in Hong Kong, and won Best Film in the 43rd Hong Kong Film Awards. The film was selected as Hong Kong's official entry for Best International Feature Film at the 97th Academy Awards, but was not nominated.

== Plot ==
Kowloon Walled City is a densely populated, anarchic enclave in Hong Kong. It is also a hotbed of criminal activity controlled by gang leader Lui Chen-tung and his enforcer, Jim “King of Killers” Chan until an alliance of gangs led by the formidable martial arts master Cyclone deposed Lui and killed Jim, bringing a kind of peace to the walled city.

Years later, in the mid-1980s, refugee Chan Lok-kwan lives a downtrodden existence in Hong Kong’s periphery, working odd jobs and competing in illegal pit fights arranged by a powerful crime lord, Mr. Big. After Mr. Big swindles Chan by selling him an unusable fake ID card, Chan desperately steals a bag of cash from Mr. Big and flees Mr. Big’s henchmen, led by the sadistic and seemingly invincible King.

Chan narrowly escapes by entering the walled city, which is protected by Cyclone, whose skill and authority deter even the local triads from entering lightly. Chan then discovers that the bag was full of drugs and not cash, and when he tries to sell the stolen drugs within the walled city, Cyclone’s gang members angrily intervene. After an initial brawl, Cyclone subdues Chan and takes pity on his wretched state, offering him a place to stay. Cyclone also returns the stolen drugs to Mr. Big along with some cash to settle the dispute.

Chan begins working various jobs within Kowloon Walled City’s dense urban maze of illegal workshops and businesses to pay back Cyclone. But Chan soon fits in, befriending Cyclone’s lieutenants Shin, AV, and Twelfth Master, a lieutenant of the Temple Street Gang. Together, Chan, Shin, AV, and Twelfth Master become known as the Kowloon 4.

Meanwhile, Dik Chau, the walled city’s biggest landlord and a high-ranking triad member, calls a meeting with Cyclone and Tiger, leader of the Temple Street Gang. All three are long-time allies, going back to when they united to depose Lui Chen-tung and kill Jim. Unbeknownst to Chau and Tiger, Cyclone and Jim had struck an unlikely friendship, and even though Cyclone killed Jim, he also helped Jim’s wife flee Hong Kong with her newborn son. Chau, however, swore an oath to destroy Jim’s family to avenge the loss of his own, whom Jim murdered. Now, at long last, Chau announces he has discovered Jim’s son, who turns out to be Chan.

The Kowloon 4 try to hustle Chan safely out of the walled city, before Chau and Tiger’s gangs try to kill him, but they are too late. A fierce brawl erupts, in which Cyclone does not take part, and Chan narrowly defends himself against Chau and Tiger, getting heavily injured.

Feeling betrayed by Cyclone, Chau seeks Mr. Big’s help to kill Chan. Mr. Big’s gang assaults the walled city, and in the mayhem that follows, Mr. Big receives heavy internal injuries from Cyclone, but King kills the ailing Cyclone. All members of the Kowloon 4 suffer dire wounds while evacuating Chan from the walled city.

King kills Mr. Big and imprisons Chau, ruling the walled city tyrannically until Chan recovers and returns to challenge him. With the timely aid of the rest of the Kowloon 4, Chan defeats King’s gang and after a protracted battle, King himself. Shin delivers the killing blow to avenge his old master Cyclone.

Afterwards, the Kowloon 4 look out over Hong Kong and note that while the city constantly changes, their friendship never will.

== Cast ==
- Louis Koo as Cyclone (龍捲風): a martial arts master who strives to protect the safety and stability of the residents in the Kowloon Walled City.
- Sammo Hung as Mr. Big (大老闆): a crime lord who is solely focused on maximizing his wealth and personal interests.
- Richie Jen as Dik Chau (狄秋): a high-ranking member of the triad, as well as the biggest landlord in the walled city.
- Raymond Lam as Chan Lok-kwan (陳洛軍): a refugee who settled in the walled city but became entangled in the chaos within and faced the imminent demolition of the city.
- Terrance Lau as Shin (信一): the loyal second-in-command of Cyclone's outlaw gang who later becomes a companion to Chan.
- Kenny Wong as Tiger (Tiger 哥): Twelfth Master's boss and the head of the Temple Street gang.
- Philip Ng as King (王九): Mr. Big's right-hand man.
- Tony Wu as Twelfth Master (十二少): a katana-wielding member of Tiger's outlaw gang who later becomes a companion to Chan.
- German Cheung as AV (四仔): a kickboxer in Cyclone's outlaw gang who later becomes a companion to Chan.
- Chu Pak Hong as Woman Beater (九索): a woman beater who dabbled in prostitution and drugs. He was beaten up by the Kowloon 4 (Lok-kwun, Shin, Twelfth Master and AV).
- Fish Liew as Fanny (燕芬姐): a walled city local who works in a fishball stall.
- Cecilia Choi as Jim's wife (蘇玉儀/占妻): Jim's wife and Lok-kwun's mother.
- Jozev Kiu as Double Blade (阿七): owner of a char siu rice stall in the walled city.
- Aaron Kwok as Jim (陳占/殺人王): the notorious "King of Killers" who was ultimately defeated by Cyclone. He is also Chan Lok-kwan's father. (special guest appearance)

== Production ==
The project had been in development since the 2000s, where it was set to be co-directed by John Woo and Johnnie To and star an all-star cast of Chow Yun-fat, Andy Lau, Tony Leung, Sean Lau, Louis Koo, Anthony Wong, Sun Honglei, Anita Yuen and Zhang Jingchu, with Nicolas Cage, James McAvoy, Li Baotian, Jang Dong-gun, Li Bingbing and Zhang Fengyi making special appearances, as shown on a teaser poster, although nothing was confirmed.

On 13 April 2013, Media Asia announced the project was to be titled Dragon City and set to be directed by Derek Kwok and starring Donnie Yen, who would also serve as action director and producer through his production company, Super Hero Films, and was set to begin production in September of that year.

After seemingly stuck in development hell for several years, Media Asia once again announced the project on 28 February 2021, with Soi Cheang set to direct while Koo, Richie Jen and Zhang Jin are set to star. Principal photography for the film officially began on 22 November 2021, as was revealed in a post on the film's official Facebook page, although the cast was not revealed yet until the film held its production commencement ceremony on 30 November, which was attended by Cheang, producers John Chong and Wilson Yip and cast members Koo, Sammo Hung, Jen, Raymond Lam, Terrance Lau, Kenny Wong, Tony Wu, German Cheung, Philip Ng, Chu Pak Hong and Chung Suet Ying. Koo revealed that two replica sets of the Kowloon Walled City were built for filming, while actual magazines, record albums, televisions and commercials from the 1980s will be used as props. All the main cast spent a year training to prepare for the film's fight scenes. On 3 April 2022, filming was officially wrapped and the film went into the post-production process.

== Release ==
Twilight of the Warriors: Walled In was theatrically released in Hong Kong and mainland China on 1 May 2024. The film became the highest-grossing one in Hong Kong by July 2024, earning $105 million HKD, and surpassed the record for the most-viewed local film with 1.59 million viewers. It also topped the mainland Chinese daily box office, earning $95 million USD by the end of May.

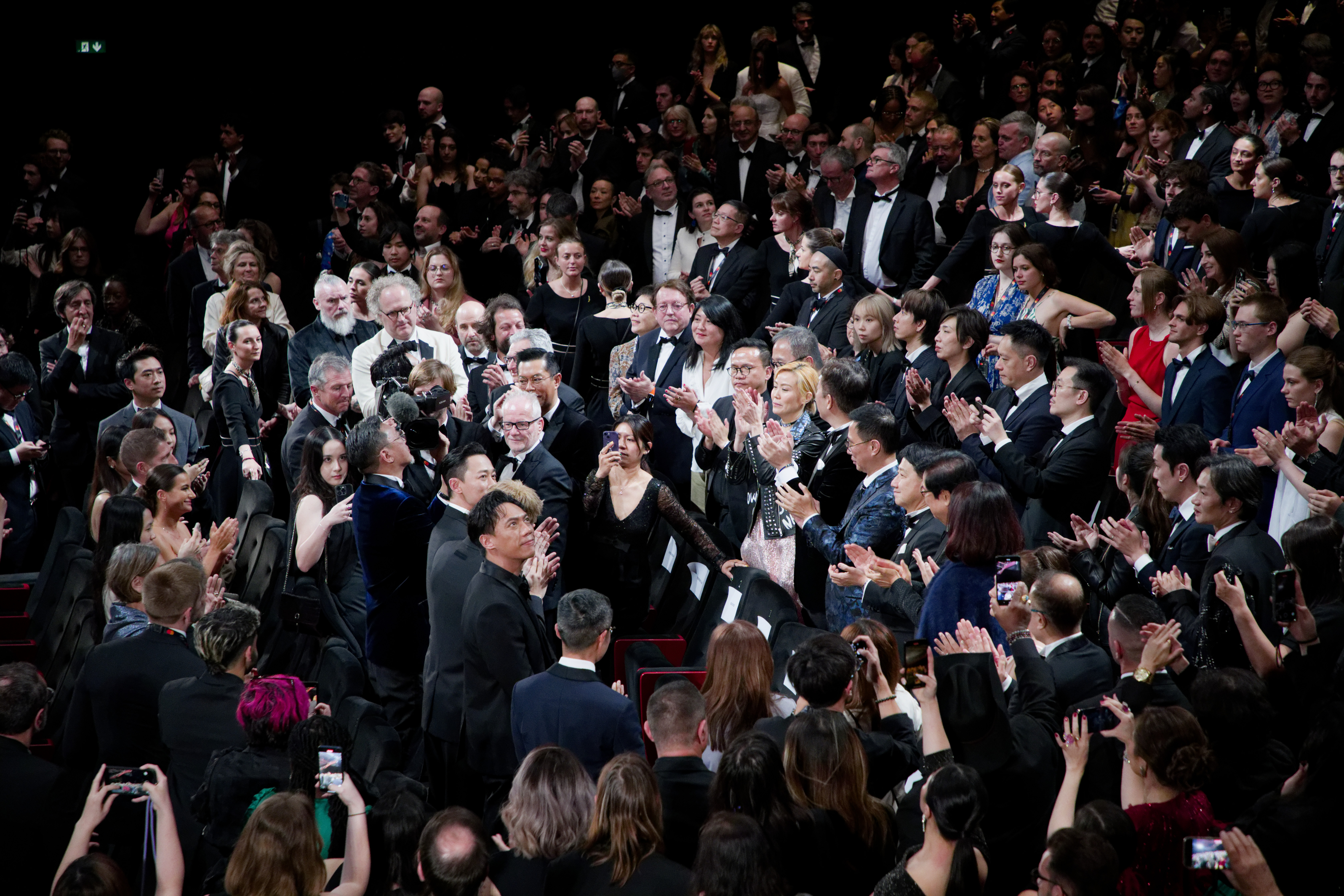
The cast and crowd at the film's midnight screening at the 2024 Cannes Film Festival

The film was also selected to be in the Official Selection (Midnight Screening) of the 2024 Cannes Film Festival, where it was screened on 16 May 2024. It also released in the UK on 24 May 2024. The film was also showcased at the 23rd New York Asian Film Festival on 28 July 2024, as the closing film of the festival.

The film had its Canadian premiere at the 28th Fantasia International Film Festival on August 1, 2024. It will also be showcased at 37th Tokyo International Film Festival in Gala Selection on 1 November 2024.

It was featured in the Limelight section of the 54th International Film Festival Rotterdam to be screened in February 2025.

== Reception ==
=== Box office ===
Twilight of the Warriors: Walled In grossed a total of US$111,456,536 worldwide, combining its gross from Hong Kong (US$13,729,253), mainland China (US$94,345,074), United States, (US$336,023), France (US$367,979), United Kingdom (US$136,272), Australia (US$468,253), New Zealand (US$50,037), Vietnam (US$1,978,004) and South Korea (US$45,641).

=== Critical reception ===
On the review aggregator website Rotten Tomatoes, 92% of 37 critics' reviews are positive, with an average rating of 7.8/10. The website's consensus reads: "An action-packed homage that nails the nitty-gritty choreo-crazed daze of '80s Hong Kong cinema to masterful effect." Metacritic, which uses a weighted average, assigned the film a score of 77 out of 100, based on 10 critics, indicating "generally favorable" reviews.

== Awards and nominations ==
The film received a total of 14 nominations in the 43rd Hong Kong Film Awards, making it the second most-nominated film of the year, behind The Last Dance.

Year	Award	Category	Nominee	Result	Ref.
2025	31st Hong Kong Film Critics Society Awards	Best Film	Twilight of the Warriors: Walled In	Won	
2025	18th Asian Film Awards	Best Film	Twilight of the Warriors: Walled In	Nominated	
2025	18th Asian Film Awards	Best Supporting Actor	Philip Ng	Nominated	
2025	18th Asian Film Awards	Best Costume Design	Bruce Yu, Karen Yip	Nominated	
2025	18th Asian Film Awards	Best Production Design	Kenneth Mak, Ambrose Chau	Won	
2025	18th Asian Film Awards	Best Editing	Cheung Ka-fai	Won	
2025	18th Asian Film Awards	Best Cinematography	Cheng Siu-keung	Nominated	
2025	18th Asian Film Awards	Best Original Music	Kenji Kawai	Nominated	
2025	18th Asian Film Awards	Best Visual Effects	Jules Lin, Ma Siu-fu, Garrett Lam, Yee Kwok-leung	Nominated	
2025	18th Asian Film Awards	Best Sound	Yiu Chun-hin, Cheung Man-hoi, To Burnard Davy	Nominated	
2025	29th Satellite Awards	Stunt Award	Twilight of the Warriors: Walled In	Won	
2025	29th Satellite Awards	Best Visual Effects	Garrett Lam, Jules Lin, Kwok-Leung Yu	Nominated	
2025	43rd Hong Kong Film Awards	Best Film	Twilight of the Warriors: Walled In	Won	
2025	43rd Hong Kong Film Awards	Best Director	Soi Cheang	Won	
2025	43rd Hong Kong Film Awards	Best Actor	Raymond Lam	Nominated	
2025	43rd Hong Kong Film Awards	Best Supporting Actor	Louis Koo	Nominated	
2025	43rd Hong Kong Film Awards	Best Supporting Actor	Philip Ng	Nominated	
2025	43rd Hong Kong Film Awards	Best New Performer	Jozev Kiu	Nominated	
2025	43rd Hong Kong Film Awards	Best Cinematography	Cheng Siu-keung	Won	
2025	43rd Hong Kong Film Awards	Best Editing	Cheung Ka-fai	Won	
2025	43rd Hong Kong Film Awards	Best Art Direction	Mak Kwok-keung, Ambrose Chau	Won	
2025	43rd Hong Kong Film Awards	Best Costume Make Up Design	Bruce Yu, Karen Yip	Won	
2025	43rd Hong Kong Film Awards	Best Action Choreography	Kenji Tanigaki	Won	
2025	43rd Hong Kong Film Awards	Best Original Film Score	Kenji Kawai	Nominated	
2025	43rd Hong Kong Film Awards	Best Sound Design	Yiu Chun-hin, Cheung Man-hoi, To Burnard Davy	Won	
2025	43rd Hong Kong Film Awards	Best Visual Effects	Lin Chun-yue Jules, Ma Siu-fu, Garrett K Lam, Yee Kwok-keung	Won	

== Future ==
Director Soi Cheang has announced that he is working on two projects for the franchise: a prequel titled Twilight of the Warriors: Dragon Throne and a sequel, Twilight of the Warriors: The Final Chapter, both of which are slated to be filmed simultaneously.

In October 2025, the film's official social media accounts announced that Twilight of the Warriors: The Final Chapter had officially begun production. The plot of the movie would be set in the 1980s and 1990s, and the team invited former residents of Kowloon Walled City to contribute objects and memorabilia representative of that era to the film. As a token of appreciation, the production would be giving away limited-edition Kowloon Walled City: The Final Chapter tote bags, emphasizing that this gift was exclusive to those who donated.

Director Soi Cheang announced at the Tokyo International Film Festival that filming for the sequel would begin in March 2026. He also mentioned that the prequel will be filmed shortly afterward, though the producers have not yet set release dates for either production. Filming occurred by May 21, 2026.

== See also ==
- Sammo Hung filmography
- List of submissions to the 97th Academy Awards for Best International Feature Film
- List of Hong Kong submissions for the Academy Award for Best International Feature Film
