= Candy Lo =

Hong Kong actress and singer (born 1974)

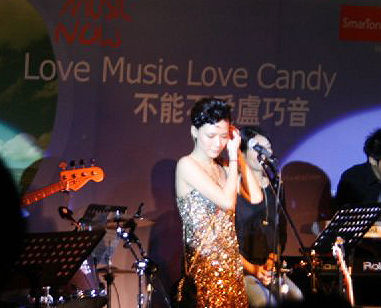
- Lo in 2007
- Born: 盧巧音; 18 October 1974 (age 51); British Hong Kong
- Occupations: Singer; actress
- Years active: 1995–present

Chinese name
- Traditional Chinese: 盧巧音
- Simplified Chinese: 卢巧音
Transcriptions
Standard Mandarin
- Hanyu Pinyin: Lú Qiǎo Yīn
Yue: Cantonese
- Jyutping: Lou4 Haau2 Jam1
- Musical career
- Also known as: Lum Lum (nickname)
- Origin: Hong Kong
- Genres: Chinese rock, Cantopop, alternative rock
- Labels: Sony Music [Hong Kong] (1998–2006); WOW Music (2007–2008); WhatsUp Music Ltd (2014–2015)
- Website: Official website

Candy Lo Hau-yam is a Canto-rock singer-songwriter and film actress from Hong Kong. Formerly the lead vocalist of the band Black and Blue, Lo launched her solo career in 1998 and is best known for the singles, "Trash" (垃圾) and "Please Break Up" (好心分手).

== Career ==
=== 1995-1996: Black & Blue ===
Prior to going solo, Lo was the lead vocalist in the Hong Kong indie rock band Black & Blue. The band released two albums: Hope in Just One Day (1995) containing songs mostly sung in English; and Black & Blue (1996) sung completely in Cantonese, a decision made with their record label to make themselves more understandable to fans. Lo wrote all the lyrics on both albums.

=== 1998-2005: Solo career with Sony Music ===
In 1998, Lo signed with Sony Music Hong Kong to launch a career as a solo artist. Her first release under Sony was the EP Don't Have to be...Too Perfect (不需要...完美得可怕) which contained the breakthrough radio-hit "Trash" (垃圾), considered one of her signature songs. Although "Trash" was a fairly mainstream ballad, the rest of the EP showed a continuity with her indie past. Lo would later ditch Keith Chan and Wyman Wong who had a dominant presence on the EP to work with entirely different songwriters and lyricists for her debut album. Released in late 1998, Lo's first full-length solo album was titled Miao, which referred to her love of cats and how "they listen while people sometimes don't."Miao was apparently released to "more than disappointing" album sales and low radio airplay, with producer Kubert Leung remarking that the public had "failed to grasp the concept of the album."

Lo's second album, Getting Closer to Candy Lo (貼近盧巧音) (1999), represented a more conscious attempt to connect with a mainstream audience, while retaining a sense of the unique individualism found in Miao. The album continued to set Lo's music apart from the mainstream. It contained five of her compositions, including the single "Regeneration", (新陳代謝) which was influenced by 70's art rock. Upon release, the album garnered her some comparisons as "Hong Kong's Faith Yang". Art direction for the album was done by William Chang.

A substantially more commercial direction was signalled by the release of 2002's Appreciating the Taste of Life (賞味人間), which gave Lo her first-ever smash hit, "Please Break Up" (好心分手). The song topped the charts and won her year-end awards at all four of Hong Kong's major radio and TV stations, making it a career highlight for Lo. A duet version of the song was recorded with Taiwan singer Leehom Wang to accompany the second edition of the album. The song remains one of the most frequently requested songs at Hong Kong karaoke bars to this day.

In May 2003, Lo held her first stadium concert at the Hong Kong Coliseum, True Music 1st Flight Live 2003, performing for two nights. This coincided with the release of the album Candy's Airline (糖果航空), which spawned one of her biggest hits, "Love Triangle" (三角誌), and was followed up later in the year by Flower Talk (花言.巧語) which contained a further hit, "Fall & Blossom" (落地開花).

After a string of radio-friendly albums, Lo released her final album with Sony, Evolution Theory (天演論) in 2005, which returned to her alternative musical roots and is one of her most uncompromising albums to date. Like Flower Talk which preceded it, the album contains lyrics which deal with Buddhist themes.

=== 2007-2011: Process & Retirement ===
After a 2-year musical hiatus (during which she appeared in six films), Lo released her 10th studio album, Process, on 10 June 2007, upon joining her new record company "WOW Music". She is the first artist to release a USB flash memory digital album in Asia. Process contained the radio chart-topping hit "Love to the Limit" (愛到不能) and a Mandarin song, "Run Slowly" (走慢點) which was previously available for download at Candy's temporary website https://web.archive.org/web/20071016051856/http://www.candylo.hk/ and saw a hit rate of more than 200,000 before being taken down.

At a concert in 2011, Lo announced her retirement as a singer, though stated that she will continue to produce music behind-the-scenes. She has previously expressed dissatisfaction with the Hong Kong music industry and of having had a "difficult 13 years".

=== 2014-present: Return to music ===
In 2014, Lo signed onto the newly founded label, WhatsUp Music Limited and collaborated with the band Fabel on the single "Self-Love" (自戀自在). "Self-Love" topped two of the four major Hong Kong singles charts and received a nomination for "Best Vocal Collaboration" at the 2014 CASH Golden Sail Music Awards. She released two further singles under the label, namely, "Pastoral Dream" (田園驚夢) and "The Philosopher" (哲學家) in 2015.

In November 2017, Lo released the single, "Tomorrow We Will Run by the Sea" (明日我與你海邊跑一天). The single coincided with her concert series RE:TURN 盧巧音Candy Lo Concert 2017 held at the Hong Kong Macpherson Stadium on 20–21 December.

In November 2018, Lo contributed vocals to the alt-rock single, "Sunset Party" (日落派對), as part of a collaborative project between composer Vicky Fung and lyricist Chow Yiu Fai.

=== Acting ===
Lo has appeared in numerous films, often as a supporting player in comedies. Notably, she was nominated three times at the 20th Hong Kong Film Awards (2001) for her roles in Tsui Hark's Time and Tide (Best Newcomer, Best Supporting Actress) and Twelve Nights [十二夜] (Best Newcomer). She received further nominations for her supporting roles in Truth or Dare : 6th Floor Rear Flat (六樓後座) in 2004 and Six Strong Guys (六壯士) in 2005.

== Personal life ==
Lo married Sammy So, lead singer of the band Kolor, in April 2013.

== Discography ==
=== Albums ===
- Miao... (1998)
- 貼近盧巧音 (Getting Closer to Candy Lo) (1999)
- 色放 (Colour Release) (2000)
- MUSE (2000)
- Fantasy (2001)
- 賞味人間 (Appreciating the Taste of Life) (2002)
- 糖果航空 (Candy's Airline) (2003)
- 花言.巧語 (Flower Talk) (2003)
- 天演論 (Evolution Theory) (2005)

=== EPs ===
- 不需要...完美得可怕 (Don't Have to be... Too Perfect) (1998)
- Process (2007)
- L (2008)
- Nuri (2012)

=== Compilations ===
- 喜歡戀愛 (Like To Love) (2001)
- 4 Seasons in One Day (2004)

=== Live albums ===
- True Music 1st Flight Live 2003 (2003)

== Filmography ==
=== Films ===
- What is a Good Teacher (自從他来了) (2000)
- Twelve Nights (十二夜) (2000)
- Time And Tide (順流逆流) (2000)
- Funeral March (常在我心) (2001)
- No Problem 2 (沒問題2) (2002)
- Marry a Rich Man (嫁個有錢人) (2002)
- Happy Family (風流家族) (2002)
- Tiramisu (戀愛行星) (2002)
- The Eye (見鬼) (2002)
- If You Care... (賤精先生) (2002)
- Summer I Love You (好心相愛) (2002)
- Truth or Dare: 6th Floor Rear Flat (六樓後座) (2003)
- Men Suddenly in Black (大丈夫) (2003)
- Herbal Tea (男上女下) (2004)
- Six Strong Guys (六壯士) (2004)
- Bug Me Not! (虫不知 ) (2005)
- Teacher in University (高校教師) (2005)
- The Heavenly Kings (四大天王) (2006)
- Cocktail (半醉人間) (2006)
- Half Twin (半邊靈) (2006)
- Feel It, Say It (談談情, 說說性) (2006)
- The Wife from Hell (妻骨未寒) (2006)
- Fear Factors (恐懼元素) (2007)
- House of Mahjong (嚦咕嚦咕對對碰) (2007)
- Happy Funeral (六樓后座2 家屬謝禮) (2008)
- Split Second Murders (死神傻了) (2009)
- Punished (報應) (2011)
- Probation Order (澀青298-03) (2013)
- 77 Heartbreaks (原諒他77次) (2017)
- Our Time Will Come (明月幾時有) (2017)

=== Television shows ===
Year	Title	Network	Role	Notes
2019	King Maker II	ViuTV	Judge	Ep. 36-40
