= Nam Byeong-gil =

Korean scientist (1820–1869)

Nam Byeong-gil (Korean: 남병길; Hanja: 南秉吉; MR: Nam Pyŏnggil, 1820–1869), also known as Nam Sang-gil (南相吉, 남상길), courtesy name Jasang (자상; 字裳), art name Yugiljae (육일재; 六一齋) or Hyecheon (혜천; 惠泉), was a Korean mathematician and astronomer of the Joseon period. He was a member of the Uiryeong Nam clan. His brother Nam Byeong-cheol (南秉哲) was also a noted astronomer.

His works included:

- Siheon giyo (時憲紀要)
- Seonggyeong (星鏡)
- Yangdo uidoseol (量度儀圖說)
- Chubo cheoprye (推步捷例)
- Chiljeong bobeop (七政步法)
- Taeyang chulippyo (太陽出入表)
- Seonhak jeongui (算學正義)
- Seontaek giyo (選擇紀要)
- Jungseong sinpyo (中星新表)
- Chunchu ilsiggo (春秋日食攷)
