= Kubert Leung =

Hong Kong musician

Kubert Leung (梁翹柏) is a musician and Cantopop songwriter in Hong Kong. In the 1980s he set up two Cantopop bands, Life Exhibition and Ukiyo-e (浮世繪). Later, Kubert Leung became a songwriter for singer Candy Lo. He has also written songs for Eason Chan, Faye Wong, Hacken Lee, Miriam Yeung, Anthony Wong and Bibi Zhou, among others. Recently, Kubert Leung became the band leader in TVB music programme Jade Solid Gold. He has also been the musical director of many Chinese singing competitions, most notably as the executive music director of I Am A Singer.
