= List of Hong Kong films of 2019 =

This article lists feature-length Hong Kong films released in 2019.

== Box office ==
The highest-grossing Hong Kong films released in 2019, by domestic box office gross revenue, are as follows:

Highest-grossing films released in 2019
| Rank | Title | Distributor | Domestic gross |
|---|---|---|---|
| 1 | Integrity | Emperor Cinema | HK$30,986,111 |
| 2 | Ip Man 4: The Finale | Mandarin Motion Pictures | HK$28,983,160 |
| 3 | The White Storm 2: Drug Lords | Universe Films Distribution | HK$24,373,233 |
| 4 | Still Human | Golden Scene Company Limited | HK$19,201,830 |
| 5 | P Storm | Mandarin Motion Pictures | HK$17,514,387 |

== Releases ==
| Title | Director | Cast | Notes |
|---|---|---|---|
| Binding Souls | Chan Pang-chun | Kara Wai, Carlos Chan, Angie Shum, Edmond Poon, Tsao Yu-ning | In theatres 5 September 2019 |
| Bodies at Rest | Renny Harlin | Nick Cheung, Richie Jen, Yang Zi, Clara Lee, Feng Jiayi | In theatres 22 August 2019 |
| Chasing the Dragon II: Wild Wild Bunch | Wong Jing; Jason Kwan | Tony Leung Ka-fai, Louis Koo, Gordon Lam, Simon Yam | In theatres 6 June 2019 |
| Dearest Anita | Clifton Ko; Pako Leung | Myolie Wu, Sonija Kwok, Alex Lam, Yuki Fong, Paris Wong | In theatres 3 January 2019 |
| Deception of the Novelist | Christopher Sun | Justin Cheung, Linah Matsuoka, Jeana Ho, Kelly Chen, Gregory Wong | In theatres 15 June 2019 |
| Fagara | Heiward Mak | Sammi Cheng, Megan Lai, Li Xiaofeng, Kenny Bee, Richie Jen, Andy Lau | In theatres 12 September 2019 |
| First Night Nerves | Stanley Kwan | Sammi Cheng, Gigi Leung, Bai Baihe, Angie Chiu | In theatres 10 January 2019 |
| G Affairs | Lee Cheuk-pan | Chapman To, Hanna Chan, Kyle Li, Huang Lu, Alan Luk, Griselda Yeung | In theatres 14 March 2019 |
| Guilt by Design | Kenneth Lai; Paul Sze; Lau Wing-tai | Nick Cheung, Hans Zhang, Paul Chun, Kent Cheng, Elaine Jin | In theatres 7 November 2019 |
| A Home with a View | Herman Yau | Francis Ng, Louis Koo, Anita Yuen, Cheung Tat-ming, Lam Suet, Anthony Wong | In theatres 24 January 2019 |
| Integrity | Alan Mak | Sean Lau, Nick Cheung, Karena Lam | In theatres 31 January 2019 |
| Ip Man 4: The Finale | Wilson Yip | Donnie Yen, Danny Chan Kwok-kwan, Scott Adkins, Vanness Wu | In theatres 20 December 2019 |
| The Lady Improper | Jessey Tsang | Charlene Choi, Wu Kang-jen, Deep Ng | In theatres 4 April 2019 |
| A Lifetime Treasure | Andrew Lam | Sammo Hung, Andrew Lam, Louis Cheung, Ivana Wong, Bob Lam, Tien Niu, Leung Siu-lung, Teddy Robin, Richard Ng, Lam Suet | In theatres 31 January 2019 |
| Line Walker 2 | Jazz Boon | Nick Cheung, Louis Koo, Francis Ng, Jiang Peiyao, Zhang Yichi, Liu Yuning, Huang Zhizhong | In theatres 8 August 2019 |
| Little Q | Law Wing-cheung | Simon Yam, Gigi Leung, Him Law, Charlie Yeung | In theatres 15 August 2019 |
| Missbehavior | Pang Ho-cheung | | In theatres 31 January 2019 |
| Missing | Ronnie Chau | Gillian Chung, Ling Man-lung | In theatres 14 November 2019 |
| P Storm | David Lam | Louis Koo, Gordon Lam, Kevin Cheng, Raymond Lam, Chrissie Chau, Liu Kai-chi, Lo Hoi-pang | In theatres 4 April 2019 |
| Still Human 淪落人 | Oliver Chan | Anthony Wong, Crisel Consunji, Sam Lee | In theatres 11 April 2019 |
| Till We Meet Again | Steven Ma | Steven Ma, Josephine Koo, Jennifer Yu | In theatres 5 December 2019 |
| Three Husbands | Fruit Chan | Chloe Maayan | In theatres 14 March 2019 |
| Walk With Me | Ryon Lee | Michelle Wai, Alex Lam, Richard Ng | In theatres 22 August 2019 |
| We Are Legends | Daniel Chan | Lam Yiu-sing, Edward Ma, Wiyona Yeung, Eric Kot, Yuen Qiu | In theatres 21 March 2019 |
| The White Storm 2 - Drug Lords | Herman Yau | Andy Lau, Louis Koo | In theaters 16 July 2019 |
| A Witness Out of the Blue | Andrew Fung | Louis Koo, Louis Cheung, Jessica Hsuan, Cherry Ngan, Philip Keung, Fiona Sit, Patrick Tam, Andy On | In theaters 24 October 2019 |

== See also ==
- 2019 in Hong Kong
