= Hedwig Tam =

Hong Kong actress (born 1990)

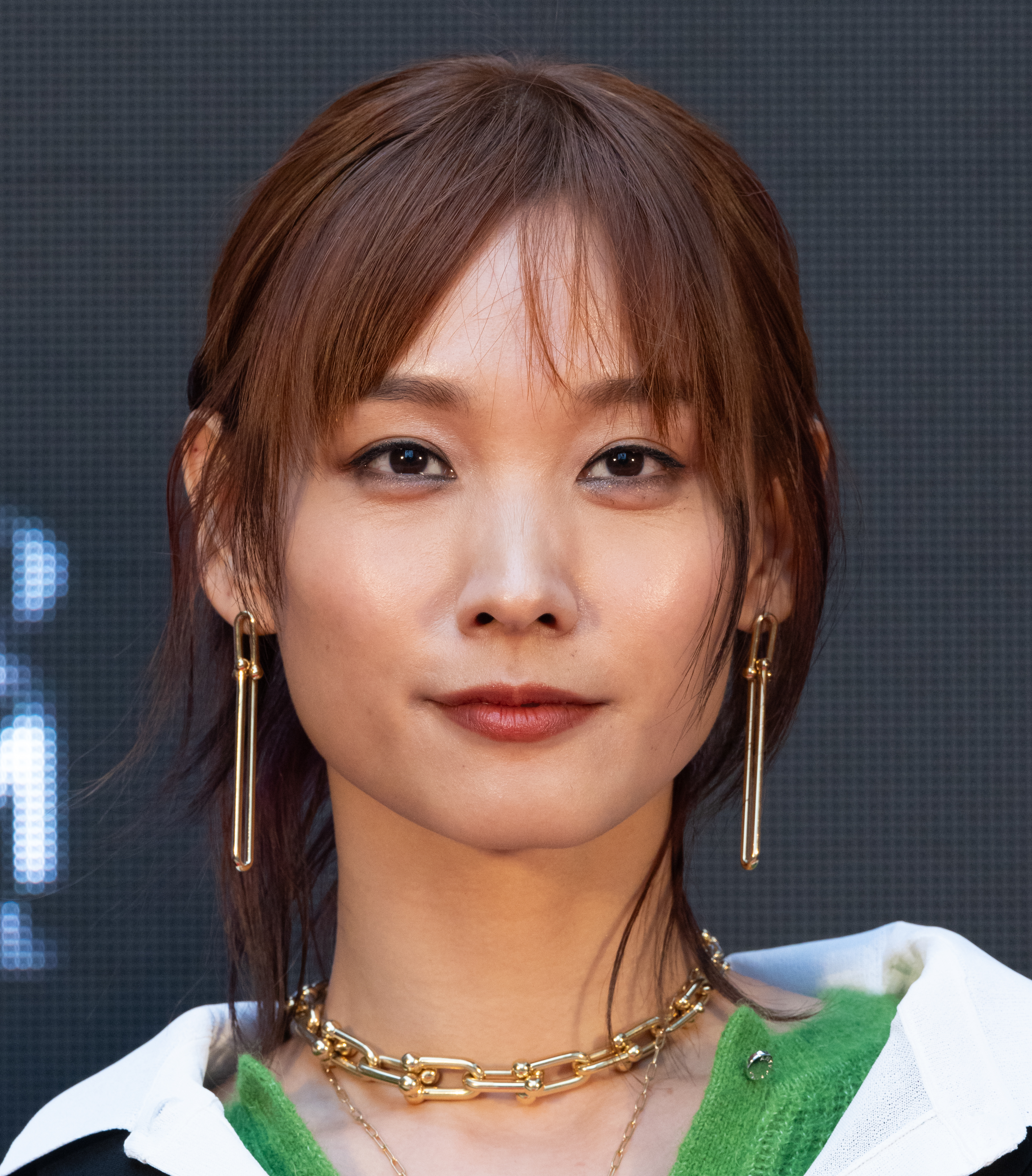
- Tam at the 2024 TIFF
- Born: Tam Sin-yin; 29 March 1990 (age 36); Hong Kong
- Occupation: Actress
- Years active: 2016–present

Chinese name
- Traditional Chinese: 談善言
- Simplified Chinese: 谈善言
Transcriptions
Standard Mandarin
- Hanyu Pinyin: Tán Shànyán
Yue: Cantonese
- Jyutping: Taam4 Sin6-jin4
- IPA: [tʰam˩ sin˨.jin˩]

Hedwig Tam Sin-yin (Chinese: 談善言; born 29 March 1990) is a Hong Kong actress. She received a nomination for Best New Performer in the 36th Hong Kong Film Awards for her debut role in Weeds on Fire (2016), and gained recognition for her breakout role as Chong Wai in the ViuTV series Warriors Within (2020–2024).

Tam also starred in the films The First Girl I Loved (2021), Hong Kong Family (2022), and Smashing Frank (2025). In 2025, she won Best Actress in the 31st Hong Kong Film Critics Society Awards for her performance in Montages of a Modern Motherhood (2024).

== Early life and education ==
Tam was born on 29 March 1990 to a middle-class family. Her Chinese given name Sin-yin (善言) was chosen by her parents and means "kind words". She chose her English given name Hedwig for its meanings of "combat and persistence". She grew up in Ma On Shan as a middle child with an older sister and a younger brother. Her father worked as an expatriate outside Hong Kong. Tam described herself as not enjoying studying during her school years, and instead being passionate about sports, having participated in volleyball and basketball since primary school. She studied at Po Leung Kuk Wu Chung College for secondary education, where she was classmates with fellow actor and singer Stanley Yau. During her university years, she assisted a friend in organizing a fashion show, where she met industry professionals and inadvertently entered the field, working part-time as a costume dresser for models. After graduating with a bachelor's degree in marketing and public relations, she was invited to model due to her company's expansion and began her modeling career in 2012, primarily filming television advertisements. That same year, she also started acting in short films, describing her motivation to pursue acting as a "desire for fun and new experiences". She moved out of her family's home in Ma On Shan after entering showbiz and has lived in Tai Po, Tai Wai, and Yau Tsim Mong over the years.

== Career ==
=== Debut with Weeds on Fire (2016–2019) ===
Tam made a brief appearance in the 2012 RTHK anthology series DIY2K, before landing her inaugural role as Tsz-ching, an unwed pregnant teenage girl, in the 2016 film Weeds on Fire. Tam auditioned for the role based on a friend's recommendation, initially believing it was for a short film for the Fresh Wave International Short Film Festival. She described Weeds on Fire as a turning point in her life, as it inspired her desire to become an actress and garnered her the public attention needed to land future roles. She was nominated for Best New Performer in the 36th Hong Kong Film Awards, although she lost to her co-star Tony Wu. She also played the daughter of Alan Tam's character in the triad film Fooling Around Jiang Hu in the same year.

In 2017, Tam starred as Sam, the lesbian best friend of Larine Tang's character who is secretly in love with her, in the comedy film The Yuppie Fantasia 3. To prepare for her role, Tam drew inspiration from films like All About Love (2010), Blue Is the Warmest Colour (2013) and Carol (2015), and based her character on a lesbian friend. She also received a minor role in the drama film Tomorrow Is Another Day that year.

In 2018, Tam played one of the best friends of the female lead Kathy Yuen in When Sun Meets Moon, followed by a lead role as Ka-shun, a bride-to-be who is diagnosed with a brain tumor, in Adieu. She then landed a main role in the ViuTV sci-fi romance series If Love Was Not Timeless, alongside her Weeds on Fire co-star Lam Yiu-sing, where they played a couple. She also had minor roles as Bi, the daughter of an infamous robber (played by Philip Keung) in the Shaw Brothers drama series Guardian Angel, and as Lo Tin-yi, a second-generation rich teenager who gets kidnapped in the Fox Networks crime thriller series Stained.

In 2019, Tam took on another main role in a ViuTV romance series Till Death Do Us Part, playing a mistress who intervenes in the marriage of leads Sheren Tang and Sunny Chan, as well as the pole dancer Moon in the drama film The Lady Improper. She also made a cameo appearance as a university hall cheerleader in Neo Yau's ViuTV drama series Haters Gonna Stay, alongside Stephy Tang, Angela Yuen, Jennifer Yu, and Yanny Chan.

=== Breakout with Warriors Within and critical recognition (2020–present) ===
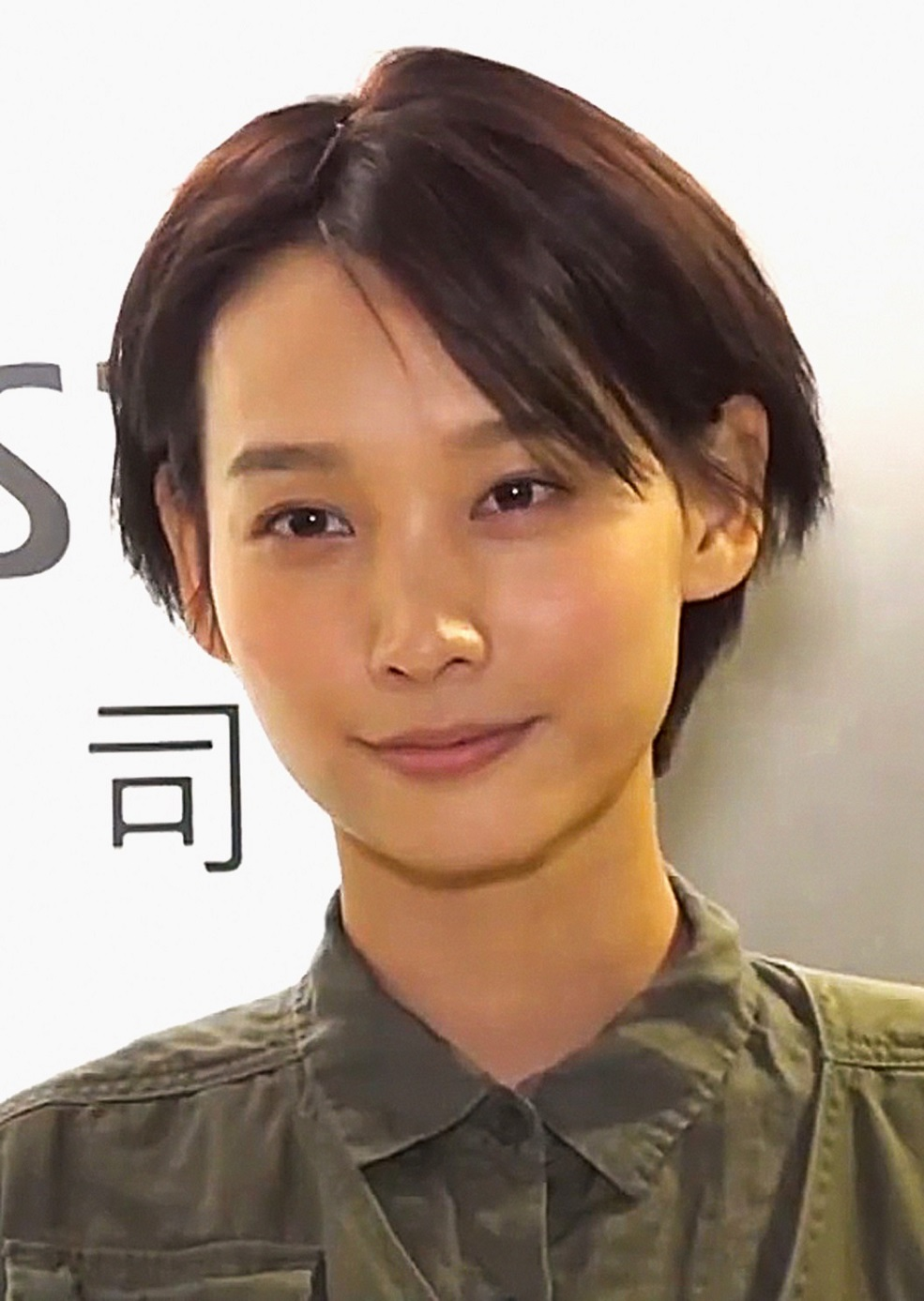
Tam promoting Warriors Within at Metro Broadcast in April 2020

In 2020, Tam received her breakout role in the ViuTV sports series Warriors Within as Chong Wai, a karateka aspiring to represent Hong Kong at the Olympics. Tam was initially hesitant to accept the role when approached by producer and lead actor Stephen Au, as she had no martial arts background. To prepare, she underwent three months of karate training before filming. The series broke viewership records for ViuTV in its first week. Calvin Choi, writing for am730, commended Tam's portrayal of Chong as "authentic", noting her ability to carry the production; Chan Pak-yu of HK01 highlighted her as the series' standout, commending her dedication to preparing for the role and her powerful fight scenes, while also delivering convincing emotional performances. Tam made a guest appearance as the younger version of Catherine Chau's character in the ViuTV-Youku drama The Gutter that year. Ngai Ga of Harper's Bazaar commended Tam's acting as "quite capable", while Choi at am730 noted that she was the reason he watched the series, particularly praising her performance in a one-take monologue. HK01 also reported on the acclaim Tam received on social media for her one-take scene. She later appeared in the music video for Eason Chan's 2020 single "Love Perhaps", and the LARP-themed variety program All Suspicious as a cast member.

In 2021, Tam landed her first lead role in the lesbian romance film The First Girl I Loved, portraying Wing alongside Renci Yeung as Sylvia, a pair of lesbian high schoolers, with Chelsea Ma of the Hong Kong Film Critics Society praising the chemistry between Tam and Yeung. She also starred as Jenny, an "oblivious" bride with Chu Pak Hong, alongside an ensemble cast consisting of Carlos Chan, Michelle Wai, Kaki Sham, and Renci Yeung, in the romantic comedy film Ready o/r Knot.

In 2022, Tam starred in the First Feature Film Initiative project Hong Kong Family, playing the estranged daughter of her parents Tse Kwan-ho and Teresa Mo, and brother Edan Lui. Alex Chung of HK01 noted that Tam's performance was the most standout among the ensemble cast due to her ability to "bring the script to life". That same year, she appeared as social worker Ho in another First Feature Film Initiative film Lost Love. Although credited as a lead, HK01's Chung described her role as "limited", but praised her performance and styling as "scene-stealing". She also starred alongside Lawrence Cheng and Stanley Yau as Chung San-kwong, a passionate teacher opposed to traditional schooling methods, in the education-themed ViuTV drama Into the Wild. Tam took on a solo leading role in the 2023 ViuTV drama series Food Buddies, playing a vegetarian activist Jan who develops a relationship with meat-eating photographer B.J. (played by Will Or), and reprised her role as Jenny in Ready or Rot, the sequel of Ready o/r Knot. She concluded the year with an appearance as the wife of Gordon Lam's character in the action thriller film I Did It My Way.

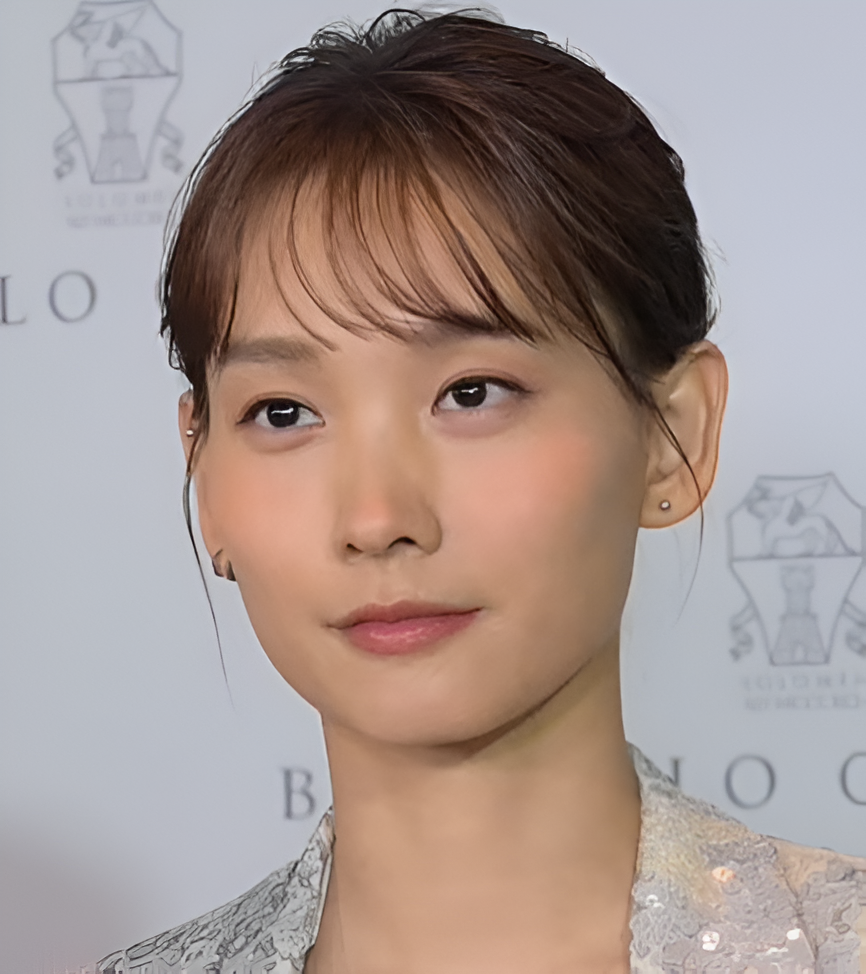
Tam interviewed by am730 in May 2024

In 2024, Tam reprised her role as Chong Wai in the second season of Warriors Within, winning Best Actress in the 9th People's Choice Television Awards for her performance. While filming a one-take crowd fight scene for Warriors Within, Tam injured herself during a jumping move, resulting in a torn ligament in her left knee, and had to rest for eight months before returning to shooting. She also starred in the leading role as Jing, a new mother, in the feminist drama film Montages of a Modern Motherhood, which premiered at the Busan International Film Festival that year. Frank Scheck of The Hollywood Reporter praised Tam's performance as "superb", highlighting how she "movingly conveys Jing's shifting moods", particularly in a monologue where she confesses her rollercoaster emotions; while Edmund Lee of the South China Morning Post lauded her "nuanced performance [as] the best of this realistic tale of maternity in a patriarchal Chinese society". Tam won Best Actress in the 31st Hong Kong Film Critics Society Awards and received a nomination for Best Actress in the 43rd Hong Kong Film Awards for her performance.

In 2025, Tam starred in the heist film Smashing Frank, the first Hong Kong film produced through crowdfunding. Despite a negative overall review from Lee of the South China Morning Post, he noted Tam's demeanor and "ambivalent characterisation" as memorable aspects of the film.

== Filmography ==
=== Film ===
Year	Title	Role	Notes/Ref.
2016	Weeds on Fire	Tsz-ching (楊芷菁)	
2016	Fooling Around Jiang Hu	Rabbit (阿拔)	
2017	The Yuppie Fantasia 3	Sam	
2017	Tomorrow Is Another Day	Young Wong Kam-fa (黃金花)	
2018	When Sun Meets Moon	Tsz-ching (紫晴)	
2018	Adieu	Ka-shun (馬嘉純)	
2019	The Lady Improper	Moon (月美)	
2021	Ready o/r Knot	Jenny	
2021	The First Girl I Loved	Wing (李詠藍)	
2022	Hong Kong Family	Kei (琪)	
2022	Lost Love	Mok (莫姑娘)	
2023	Ready or Rot	Jenny	
2023	I Did It My Way	Maggie	
2024	Montages of a Modern Motherhood	Jing (淑貞)	
2025	Smashing Frank	Ayla (紀月)	

=== Television ===
Year	Title	Role	Notes/Ref.
2012	DIY2K	—N/a	Cast extra
2018	If Love Was Not Timeless	Tsz-ching (子晴)	Main role
2018	Guardian Angel	Bi	Guest role
2019	Stained	Lo Tin-yi (羅天儀)	Guest role
2019	Till Death Do Us Part	Hui Wak-yin (許或然)	Main role
2019	Haters Gonna Stay	Cheerleader	Cameo
2020–2024	Warriors Within	Chong Wai (莊惠)	Main role (season 1–2)
2020	The Gutter	Young Fong Siu-mei (方小薇)	Guest role
2022	Into the Wild	Chung San-kwong (鍾晨光)	Main role
2023	Food Buddies	Jan	Main role

== Awards and nominations ==
Year	Award	Category	Work	Result	Ref.
2017	36th Hong Kong Film Awards	Best New Performer	Weeds on Fire	Nominated	
2025	9th People's Choice Television Awards	Best Actress	Warriors Within	Won	
2025	9th People's Choice Television Awards	Best Onscreen Duo (Note: Sharing the award with Anson Kong.)	Warriors Within	Won	
2025	31st Hong Kong Film Critics Society Awards	Best Actress	Montages of a Modern Motherhood	Won	
2025	43rd Hong Kong Film Awards	Best Actress	Montages of a Modern Motherhood	Nominated	
