= 24th New York Asian Film Festival =

Upcoming film festival in New York

- Official poster
- Opening film: Informant by Kim Suk
- Closing film: Flower Girl by Fatrick Tabada
- Location: Film at Lincoln Center, New York
- Founded: 2002
- Awards: Uncaged Award: Family Matters by Pan Ke-Yin; Audience Award: Rising Star Asia Award: Natalie Hsu
- Hosted by: New York Asian Film Foundation Inc.
- Artistic director: Samuel Jamier
- No. of films: 100+ films
- Festival date: Opening: 11 July 2025; Closing: 27 July 2025
- Language: International
- Website: NYAFF

New York Asian Film Festival
- 25th 23rd

The 24th New York Asian Film Festival opened in New York City on July 11, 2025 with South Korean film Informant by Kim Suk. This year’s theme is "Cinema as Disruption", reflecting a focus on bold, boundary-pushing storytelling. The festival presented over 100 films screened in person, featuring a diverse selection of both contemporary works and classic titles from across Asia and beyond. The programme includes more than 75 premieres, comprising eight world premieres, 41 North American premieres, and five United States premieres. Highlights include 19 Southeast Asian films representing six countries, along with 17 directorial debuts of which nearly half are by women filmmakers.

The festival closed on July 27, 2025 with 2025 Filipino Comedy film Flower Girl by Fatrick Tabada. A Taiwanese drama film Family Matters by Pan Ke-Yin, won the Uncaged Award for best feature film. The film centers on 18-year-old Spring, who discovers that she was adopted and begins to uncover the secrets of her working-class family.

== Jury ==
Jury for Uncaged award is composed of:

=== Uncaged award ===
- Masumi: Japanese-American actress and former singer-songwriter.
- Tzi Ma: a Hong Kong-American veteran actor
- Michael J. Werner: Hong Kong-based producer and consultant
- Yao: a Malaysian actor based in the United States
- Banjong Pisanthanakun: a Thai filmmaker and screenwriter

=== Shorts jury ===
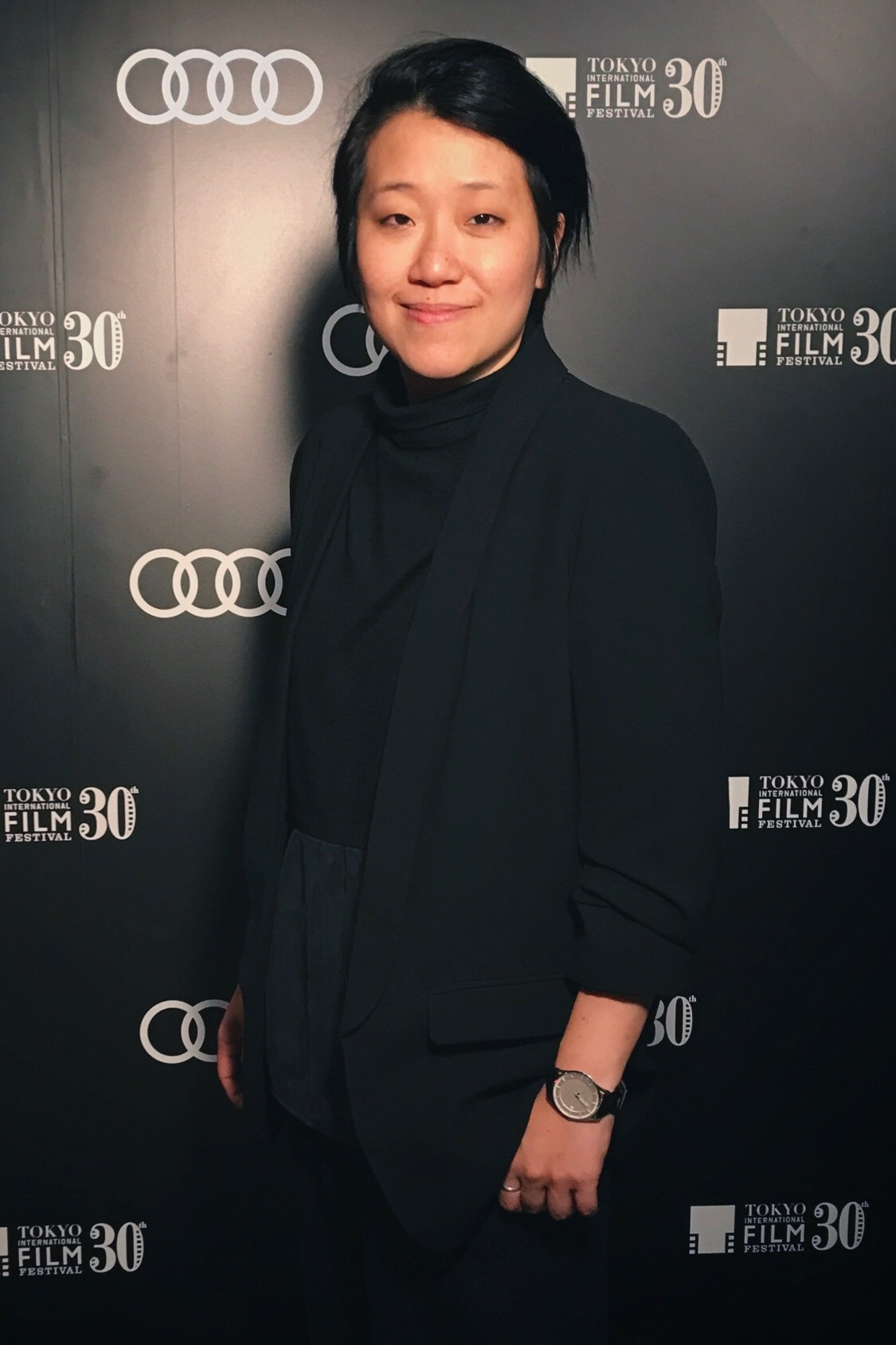
Kirsten Tan Jury Member

- Patrick Chen – a Chinese-American director.
- Aimee Long – Director and producer, raised in Paris, Beijing, and San Francisco.
- Bradley Tangonan – Hawai’i Born Filipino-American
- Kirsten Tan – a Singaporean film director and screenwriter.
- Joey Carranza – a New York City-based community builder and festival director.

== Screening venues ==
- Film at Lincoln Center
- Walter Reade Theater
- SVA Theatre
- Elinor Bunin Munroe Film Center, 144 West 65th Street
- LOOK Cinemas W57
- Korean Cultural Center New York

== Films showcase ==
| Year | Title | Original Title | Country | Director | Premiere Status |
Opening film
| 2024 | Informant | 정보원 | South Korea | Kim Suk | World Premiere |
Beyond Borders
| 2024 | I, the Song | 分身的獻曲 | Bhutan | Dechen Roder | East Coast Premiere |
| 2024 | Travesty | Juhtumi lahendamine | Mongolia | Batsukh Baatar | North American Premiere |
Centerpiece Presentation
| 2024 | The Embers | 餘燼 | Taiwan | Chung Mong-hong | East Coast Premiere |
Closing film
| 2025 | Flower Girl | | Philippines | Fatrick Tabada | International Premiere |
China Currents
| 2024 | Bel Ami | 漂亮朋友 | China, France, Denmark, Qatar | Geng Jun | North American Premiere |
| 2025 | Deep in the Mountains | 如意饭店 | China | Li Yongyi | North American Premiere |
| 2025 | Girls on Wire | 想飞的女孩 | China | Vivian Qu | North American Premiere |
| 2024 | Green Wave | 前程似锦 | China | Xu Lei | North American Premiere |
| 2024 | A Man and a Woman | 一个男人和一个女人 | China | Guan Hu | International Premiere |
| 2024 | My Friend An Delie | 我的朋友安德烈 | China | Dong Zijian | New York Premiere |
| 2024 | To Kill a Mongolian Horse | 一匹白马的热梦 | Malaysia, Hong Kong, South Korea, Japan, United States | Jiang Xiaoxuan | New York Premiere |
Diasporic Discoveries
| 2024 | 1 Girl Infinite | | United States | Lilly Hu | New York Premiere |
| 2024 | Earl. | | United States | Ty Kim | East Coast Premiere |
| 2025 | Lisa Lu Plays Herself | | United States | Chen Mei-Juin | World Premiere |
Filmmaker in Focus: Toshiaki Toyoda
| 2003 | 9 Souls | ナイン・ソウルズ | Japan | Toshiaki Toyoda | Special Screening |
| 2002 | Blue Spring | 青い春 | Japan | Toshiaki Toyoda | Special Screening |
| 2005 | Hanging Garden | 空中庭園 | Japan | Toshiaki Toyoda | Special Screening |
| 2021 | Toshiaki Toyoda's Go Seppuku Yourselves & Other Tales | Short films | Japan | Toshiaki Toyoda | Special Screening |
| 2025 | Transcending Dimensions | 次元を超える | Japan | Toshiaki Toyoda | North American Premiere |
Horrorscope
| 2024 | 404 Run Run | 404 สุขีนิรันดร์..RUN RUN | Thailand | Seua Pichaya Jarasboonpracha | North American Premiere |
| 2025 | Dollhouse | ドールハウス | Japan | Shinobu Yaguchi | North American Premiere |
| 2025 | Lilim | | Philippines | Mikhail Red | North American Premiere |
| 2024 | Missing Child Videotape | ミッシング・チャイルド・ビデオテープ | Japan | Ryota Kondo | North American Premiere |
| 2025 | Panor | Panor: Tà Thuật Huyết Ngãi | Thailand | Putipong Saisikaew | North American Premiere |
| 2024 | Possession Street | 邪Mall | Hong Kong | Jack Lai | North American Premiere |
| 2025 | The Secret House | 시크릿 하우스 | South Korea | Park Sang-min | North American Premiere |
| 2004 | Shutter | ชัตเตอร์ กดติดวิญญาณ | Thailand | Parkpoom Wongpoom, Banjong Pisanthanakun | North American Premiere |
NYAFF Rediscoveries
| 1985 | Gorgeous (2K Restoration) | 人圖（2K數位修復 | Taiwan | Chang Mei-chun | International Premiere |
| 1983 | Legend of the Sealed Book 4K restoration | 天书奇谭 | China | Wang Shuchen | North American Premiere |
| 1963 | The Monkey King – Uproar In Heaven 4K restoration | 大闹天宫 | China | Wan Laiming, Tang Cheng | North American Premiere |
| 2004 | Shutter 4K restoration | ชัตเตอร์ กดติดวิญญาณ | Thailand | Parkpoom Wongpoom, Banjong Pisanthanakun | North American Premiere |
North Korean Cool
| 2013 | Commitment | 동창생 | South Korea | Park Hong-soo | Special Screening |
| 2011 | The Front Line | 고지전 | South Korea | Jang Hoon | Special Screening |
| 2013 | The Suspect | 용의자 | South Korea | Won Shin-yun | Special Screening |
| 2018 | Swing Kids | 스윙키즈 | South Korea | Kang Hyeong-cheol | Special Screening |
Prime Picks
| 2025 | The Old Woman with the Knife | 파과 | South Korea | Min Kyu-dong | New York Premiere |
| 2024 | Papa | 爸爸 | Hong Kong | Philip Yung | Special Screening |
Queer Unbound
| 2024 | 1 Girl Infinite | | United States | Lilly Hu | New York Premiere |
| 2024 | Bel Ami | 漂亮朋友 | China, France, Denmark, Qatar | Geng Jun | North American Premiere |
| 2024 | Daughter's Daughter | 女兒的女兒 | Taiwan | Huang Xi | United States Premiere |
| 2025 | Flower Girl | | Philippines | Fatrick Tabada | International Premiere |
| 2025 | Islanders Ep. 1-2 | 親密之海 | Taiwan | Ler Jiyuan, Tsai Pao-chang | International Premiere |
| 2025 | Queerpanorama | 眾生相 | United States, Hong Kong, China | Jun Li | New York Premiere |
| 2025 | The Red Envelope | ซองแดงแต่งผี | Thailand | Chayanop Boonprakob | North American Premiere |
| 2025 | Skin of Youth | その花は夜に咲く | Vietnam, Singapore | Ash Mayfair | North American Premiere |

== Uncaged Competition – For Best Feature Film ==
Eight films competed for Uncaged award.

| Year | Title | Original Title | Country | Director | Premiere Status |
The Uncaged Award nominees
| 2025 | Deep in the Mountains | 如意饭店 | China | Li Yongyi | North American Premiere |
| 2025 | Family Matters | 我家的事 | Taiwan | Pan Ke-Yin | North American Premiere |
| 2024 | Green Wave | 前程似锦 | China | Xu Lei | North American Premiere |
| 2025 | Jinsei | 人生 | Japan | Ryuya Suzuki | North American Premiere |
| 2024 | Montages of a Modern Motherhood | 虎毒不 | Hong Kong | Oliver Chan | North American Premiere |
| 2025 | Skin of Youth | Ồn ào tuổi trẻ (その花は夜に咲く) | Vietnam, Singapore | Ash Mayfair | North American Premiere |
| 2024 | Time to Be Strong | 힘을 낼 시간 | South Korea | Namkoong Sun | North American Premiere |
| 2024 | Travesty | Juhtumi lahendamine | Mongolia | Batsukh Baatar | North American Premiere |

== Films by country or region ==
| Year | Title | Original Title | Director | Premiere status |
Bhutan
| 2024 | I, the Song | 分身的獻曲 | Dechen Roder | East Coast Premiere |
Hong Kong Panorama
| 2025 | Behind the Shadows | 私家偵探 | Jonathan Li, Chou Man-Yu | North American Premiere |
| 2025 | Last Song for You | 久別重逢 | Jill Leung | North American Premiere |
| 2024 | Montages of a Modern Motherhood | 虎毒不 | Oliver Chan | North American Premiere |
| 2024 | Papa | 爸爸 | Philip Yung | Special Screening |
| 2024 | Possession Street | 邪Mall | Jack Lai | North American Premiere |
| 2024 | Smashing Frank | 搗破法蘭克 | Trevor Choi | U.S. Premiere |
| 2024 | Valley of the Shadow of Death | 不赦之罪 | Jeffrey Lam Sen, Antonio Tam | North American Premiere |
| 2024 | The Way We Talk | 看我今天怎麼說 | Adam Wong | North American Premiere |
| 1996 | Young and Dangerous | 古惑仔之人在江湖 | Andrew Lau | Special Screening |
Indonesia
| 2025 | Gowok: Javanese Kamasutra | Gowok: Kamasutra Jawa | Hanung Bramantyo | North American Premiere |
| 2025 | This City Is a Battlefield | Perang Kota | Mouly Surya | North American Premiere |
Japanorama
| 2003 | 9 Souls | ナイン・ソウルズ | Toshiaki Toyoda | Special Screening |
| 2025 | Babanba Banban Vampire | ババンババンバンバンパイア | Shinji Hamasaki | North American Premiere |
| 2002 | Blue Spring | 青い春 | Toshiaki Toyoda | Special Screening |
| 2025 | Dollhouse | ドールハウス | Shinobu Yaguchi | North American Premiere |
| 2005 | Hanging Garden | 空中庭園 | Toshiaki Toyoda | Special Screening |
| 2025 | How Dare You? | ふつうの子ども | Mipo O | North American Premiere |
| 2024 | Missing Child Videotape | ミッシング・チャイルド・ビデオテープ | Ryota Kondo | North American Premiere |
| 2024 | Ravens | レイブンズ | Mark Gill | East Coast Premiere |
| 2025 | Samurai Fury (Muromachi Outsiders) | 室町無頼 | Yu Irie | United States Premiere |
| 2021 | Toshiaki Toyoda's Go Seppuku Yourselves & Other Tales | Short films | Toshiaki Toyoda | Special Screening |
| 2025 | Transcending Dimensions | 次元を超える | Toshiaki Toyoda | North American Premiere |
Korean Horizons
| 2024 | Forbidden Fairytale | 동화지만 청불입니다 | Lee Jong-suk | North American Premiere |
| 2024 | Fragment | 파편 | Kim Sung-yoon | United States Premiere |
| 2024 | A Girl with Closed Eyes | 영화포스터 폭로: 눈을 감은 아이 | Chun Sun-young | North American Premiere |
| 2024 | Hear Me: Our Summer | 청설 | Jo Seon-ho | North American Premiere |
| 2024 | Hidden Face | 히든페이스 | Kim Dae-woo | North American Premiere |
| 2025 | Horoomon | 호루몽 | Lee Il-ha | North American Premiere |
| 2024 | Informant | 정보원 | Kim Suk | World Premiere |
| 2024 | Method Acting | 메소드연기 | Lee Ki-hyuk | International Premiere |
| 2025 | Omniscient Reader: The Prophet | 전지적 독자 시점 | Kim Byung-woo | North American Premiere |
| 2025 | The Secret House | 시크릿 하우스 | Park Sang-min | North American Premiere |
| 2024 | Somebody | 침범 | Lee Jung-chan, Kim Yeo-jung | New York Premiere |
| 2024 | Time to Be Strong | 힘을 낼 시간 | Namkoong Sun | North American Premiere |
Malaysia
| 2024 | Pavane for an Infant | 搖籃凡世 | Chong Keat Aun | North American Premiere |
Myanmar
| 2024 | MA – Cry of Silence | 拒絕沉默的女孩 | The Maw Naing | North American Premiere |
Philippines
| 2024 | The Hearing | | Lawrence Fajardo | North American Premiere |
| 2025 | Lilim | | Mikhail Red | North American Premiere |
| 2024 | Sunshine | | Antoinette Jadaone | New York Premiere |
Taiwan Uncut
| 2024 | Daughter's Daughter | 女兒的女兒 | Huang Xi | United States Premiere |
| 2024 | The Embers | 餘燼 | Chung Mong-hong | East Coast Premiere |
| 2025 | Family Matters | 我家的事 | Pan Ke-Yin | North American Premiere |
| 1985 | Gorgeous (2K Restoration) | 人圖（2K數位修復 | Chang Mei-chun | International Premiere |
| 2025 | Islanders Ep. 1-2 | 親密之海 | Ler Jiyuan, Tsai Pao-chang | International Premiere |
| 2025 | Lovesick | 有病才會喜歡你 | Hsu Fu-Hsiang | North American Premiere |
| 2024 | Organ Child | 器子 | Chieh Shueh Bin | North American Premiere |
| 2025 | Unexpected Courage | 我意外的勇氣 | Shawn Yu | International Premiere |
Thailand (Thai Visions)
| 2024 | 404 Run Run | 404 สุขีนิรันดร์..RUN RUN | Seua Pichaya Jarasboonpracha | North American Premiere |
| 2024 | Attack 13 | วิญญาณเลขที่ 13 | Taweewat Wantha | International Premiere |
| 2024 | Flat Girls | แฟลตเกิร์ล ชั้นห่างระหว่าง เ ร า | Jirassaya Wongsutin | North American Premiere |
| 2025 | Panor | Panor: Tà Thuật Huyết Ngãi | Putipong Saisikaew | North American Premiere |
| 2025 | The Red Envelope | ซองแดงแต่งผี | Chayanop Boonprakob | North American Premiere |
| 2004 | Shutter | ชัตเตอร์ กดติดวิญญาณ | Parkpoom Wongpoom, Banjong Pisanthanakun | North American Premiere |
| 2025 | The Stone | Buôn Thần Bán Thánh | Arak Amornsupasiri, Vuthipong Sukhanindr | North American Premiere |
United States
| 2024 | 1 Girl Infinite | | Lilly Hu | North American Premiere |
| 2025 | Lisa Lu Plays Herself | | Chen Mei-Juin | World Premiere |

=== Southeast Asian Frontiers ===
| Year | Title | Original Title | Country | Director | Premiere status |
Southeast Asian Frontiers
| 2025 | Flower Girl | | Philippines | Fatrick Tabada | International Premiere |
| 2025 | Gowok: Javanese Kamasutra | Gowok: Kamasutra Jawa | Indonesia | Hanung Bramantyo | North American Premiere |
| 2024 | The Hearing | | Philippines | Lawrence Fajardo | North American Premiere |
| 2025 | Lilim | | Philippines | Mikhail Red | North American Premiere |
| 2024 | MA – Cry of Silence | 拒絕沉默的女孩 | Germany, Myanmar, Qatar, France, Italy, South Korea, Norway, Singapore | The Maw Naing | North American Premiere |
| 2024 | Pavane for an Infant | 搖籃凡世 | Malaysia | Chong Keat Aun | North American Premiere |
| 2025 | This City Is a Battlefield | Perang Kota | Indonesia | Mouly Surya | North American Premiere |
| 2025 | Skin of Youth | その花は夜に咲く | Vietnam, Singapore | Ash Mayfair | North American Premiere |
| 2024 | Sunshine | | Philippines | Antoinette Jadaone | New York Premiere |

== Shorts Program ==
=== Shorts Program 1: The Kids We Were ===
| Year | Title | Original Title | Country | Director | Premiere status |
|---|---|---|---|---|---|
| 2025 | Better Life | | United States | Jessica Liu | World Premiere |
| 2024 | The Black Dog | 黑犬 | Taiwan | Yang Ling | North American Premiere |
| 2025 | Hippopotami | He Ma | Hong Kong, China | Lin Jianjie | New York Premiere |
| 2024 | Ikigai | | United States | Ramazan Nanayev | World Premiere |
| 2024 | Searching for Sol | | Philippines | Jaime Morades | International Premiere |

=== Shorts Program 2: Uncharted Adversity ===
| Year | Title | Original Title | Country | Director | Premiere status |
|---|---|---|---|---|---|
| 2025 | Damp | | Taiwan | Etsen Chen | World Premiere |
| 2024 | Little Rebels Cinema Club | | Indonesia | Khozy Rizal | New York Premiere |
| 2025 | Red Pocket | | United States | Austin Chen | World Premiere |
| 2024 | Rooftop Lempicka | | Vietnam | Hang Luong Nguyen | New York Premiere |
| 2025 | Sammi, Who Can Detach His Body Parts | | Indonesia | Rein Maychaelson | North American Premiere |
| 2025 | Washhh | | Malaysia | Mikey Lai | New York Premiere |

=== Shorts Program 3: Stories From Her ===
| Year | Title | Original Title | Country | Director | Premiere status |
|---|---|---|---|---|---|
| 2025 | Good–Mourning | | Japan | Nina Tsuji | International Premiere |
| 2025 | Inspired By Lip Balm | | Taiwan | Chien Li-ying | North American Premiere |
| 2024 | The River Runs Still | | Vietnam | Mai Huyen Chi | World Premiere |
| 2024 | Stills Moving | | Taiwan | Kevin Tsung-Hsuan Yeh | New York Premiere |
| 2024 | Three | | United States | Amie Song | |

=== Shorts Program 4: Portraits of Tomorrow ===
| Year | Title | Original Title | Country | Director | Premiere status |
|---|---|---|---|---|---|
| 2024 | The Boy from Outer Space | | South Korea | Kim Sung-ho | |
| 2025 | Color, Color, Color | | South Korea | Kim Sejin | International Premiere |
| 2025 | Everybody Loves Everybody | | South Korea | Lee Dohee | International Premiere |
| 2024 | Finding the Rainbow | | South Korea | Yang Hwanga | World Premiere |
| 2024 | The Good Student | | South Korea | Park Hobeom | World Premiere |
| 2024 | The Rainbow Backpack Club | | South Korea | Sul Heeone | International Premiere |

== Awards and winners ==
Taiwan drama film Family Matters and Hong Kong’s The Way We Talk, drama film that explores the identity conflicts of a cochlear implant user, won the main awards.

=== Uncaged Award for Best Feature Film ===
- Family Matters by Pan Ke-Yin, Taiwan

=== Audience Award ===
- The Way We Talk by Adam Wong, Hong Kong
- Special jury awards:
  - Skin Of Youth by Ash Mayfair, Vietnam
  - Green Wave by Xu Lei, China
- Shorts showcase:
  - Good Mourning by Nina Tsuji, Japan
  - Sammi, Who Can Detach His Body Parts by Rein Maychaelson, Indonesia
  - Finding the Rainbow by Yang Hwanga, South Korea

=== Star Asia Awards ===
In Star Asia Awards category, Asian stars will be honoured with various awards such as: Ekin Cheng a Hong Kong actor and singer with Screen International Star Asia Award; Lisa Lu, a Chinese-American actress, with Vanguard Award and Screen International Star Asia Lifetime Achievement Award; Natalie Hsu, a Hong Kong actress, with Screen International Rising Star Asia Award.

| Image | Recipient | Country | Ref. |
|---|---|---|---|
Vanguard Award and Star Asia Lifetime Achievement Award
| | Lisa Lu | United States | |
Screen International Star Asia Award
| | Ekin Cheng | Hong Kong | |
Screen International Rising Star Asia Award
| | Natalie Hsu | Hong Kong | |
