= The First Girl I Loved =

2021 Hong Kong film by Yeung Chiu-hoi and Candy Ng

- Theatrical release poster
- Traditional Chinese: 喜歡妳是妳
- Literal meaning: I like you as you are
- Jyutping: Hei^{2} Fun^{1} Nei^{5} Si^{6} Nei^{5}
- Directed by: Yeung Chiu-hoi; Candy Ng
- Screenplay by: Yeung Chiu-hoi; Candy Ng; Susan Sin
- Produced by: Teddy Robin; Patrick Tong; O Sing-pui
- Starring: Hedwig Tam; Renci Yeung
- Cinematography: O Sing-pui
- Edited by: Yeung Chiu-hoi; Candy Ng; Anita Chu
- Music by: Day Tai; Labroe Lee
- Production companies: Mei Ah Entertainment; Dreams Salon
- Distributed by: Mei Ah Entertainment; Gala Films
- Release dates: 2 November 2021 (HKAFF); 25 November 2021 (Hong Kong)
- Running time: 106 minutes
- Country: Hong Kong
- Language: Cantonese

The First Girl I Loved (Chinese: 喜歡妳是妳) is a 2021 Hong Kong lesbian romance film co-directed and co-written by Yeung Chiu-hoi and Candy Ng. Starring Hedwig Tam and Renci Yeung as Wing and Sylvia, two schoolgirls and best friends, the film explores the blossoming and eventual fading of their romantic relationship during their school years.

TVB actor Yeung Chiu-hoi became interested in writing a feature film in 2014 and decided to collaborate with his university classmate and production house founder Candy Ng. Development of the project began the following year, and funding was secured in 2017 from Mei Ah Entertainment, Dreams Salon, and the Hong Kong Film Development Council. Principal photography commenced in August 2018 and spanned about one and a half years, with an additional two years dedicated to post-production. The film features a theme song "My Dear, Best Friend", performed by Eman Lam.

The film had its world premiere on 2 November 2021 at the 18th Hong Kong Asian Film Festival, followed by a theatrical release in Hong Kong on 25 November. It also won the Audience Award for Best Narrative Feature at the 29th Mardi Gras Film Festival in Australia.

== Plot ==
In 2001, Wing and Sylvia are classmates and best friends at an all-girls Catholic school. Wing secretly loves Mr. Wong, an arts teacher, and writes him a love letter. Sylvia gives the letter to Wong without asking Wing, leading to Wong rejecting her and advising her to choose her affections wisely. Embarrassed, Wing confronts Sylvia, who reveals she is actually in love with Wing. The next day, Sylvia tries to clarify it was a joke, leading Wing to believe otherwise. They decide not to bring it up again and remain best friends for a semester. Sylvia, dreaming of studying film, invites Wing to help make a short film. During filming, they mimic a scene from Days of Being Wild and share their first kiss. Their relationship blossoms, but soon they are caught kissing by the school social worker, resulting in reports to the principal. Both parents need to meet with the school. Wing's father expresses no objections, but Sylvia's father discusses their financial struggles, urging her to behave at school to keep her scholarship.

Wing buys a ring for Sylvia and presents it at school, but Sylvia reacts coldly and suggests they break up, implying their feelings might be puppy love. Unwilling to accept this, Wing chases Sylvia to the playground and kisses her in front of other students. Sylvia hesitates but returns the kiss until teachers intervene. Both are scolded and forced to write apologies for their behavior. While reading their apologies in the school hall, Sylvia angrily tears hers up and leaves, taking full responsibility and claiming she initiated the kiss. She then quits school. Wing searches for Sylvia, but she vanishes from her life.

In 2003, Wing enters university to study sociology and meets Kin-long, her first male friend, who has feelings for her. One day, Wing unexpectedly runs into Sylvia, and they catch up. When Wing is about to ask if Sylvia still wants to be together, Sylvia reveals she has a boyfriend and they have been intimate. Heartbroken, Wing leaves and seeks solace in drink. In a moment of revenge, she has sex with Kin-long in the dormitory but finds no enjoyment. Shortly after, Sylvia calls Wing. Wing rushes to the hospital, only to find that Sylvia's father has died from heart failure. Sylvia tries to be strong for her siblings but breaks down when alone with Wing. Wing hugs her tightly, offering support and suggesting reconciliation. Sylvia replies that if they are not married by 30, they will marry each other, but they should not see each other until then, which Wing agrees.

Later, Wing learns that Sylvia has dropped out of film school to support her siblings. To help Sylvia achieve her dream, Wing transfers to film school and begins working as an assistant director. Inspired by their past, she decides to make a film based on their love story. Just before turning 30, Wing receives a call from Sylvia, informing her about her upcoming marriage and inviting her to be her bridesmaid. On the wedding day, Wing asks if Sylvia has arranged the marriage before 30 intentionally, but Sylvia does not answer. When the pastor reads the vows, Sylvia turns to Wing. Wing cries and mouths "yes", while Sylvia also cries and replies "yes" to her groom. At last, Wing returns to her alma mater and dances alone in the school hall, letting go of their relationship.

== Cast ==
- Hedwig Tam as Wing, a well-behaved prefect in an all-girls Catholic school
- Renci Yeung as Sylvia, Wing's classmate and best friend who has a crush on her
- Stephen Au and Teresa Mak as Wing's father and mother
- Willie Wai and Eileen Tung as Sylvia's father and mother

In addition, Will Or appears as Sylvia's university boyfriend. Film directors Adam Wong and Chan Kin-long make cameo appearances as Mr. Wong, an arts teacher of Wing and Sylvia, and Kin-long, a university classmate of Wing, respectively.

== Production ==
=== Development ===
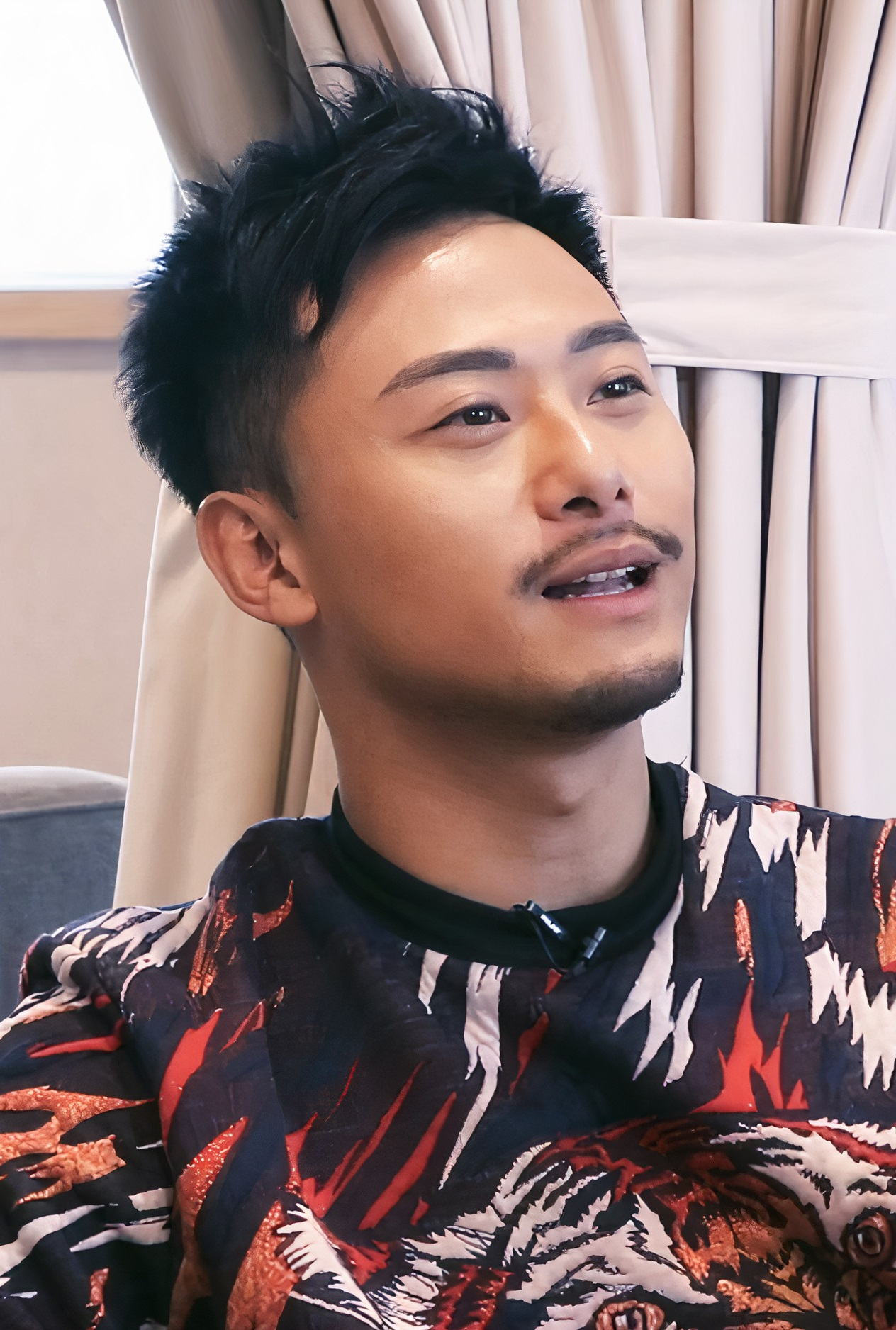
Director-screenwriter Yeung Chiu-hoi

TVB actor Yeung Chiu-hoi became interested in producing a Hong Kong-based coming-of-age romance film after watching the Taiwanese film You Are the Apple of My Eye (2011) by Giddens Ko. In 2014, he shared his desire to write a feature film with Candy Ng, his classmate at the City University of Hong Kong who founded a production house. The two began developing the project together in 2015, and completed the screenplay the same year. Yeung noted that they chose to center the film around homosexual relationships because many teenagers grapple with the confusion regarding their feelings toward the same sex during school years. However, the film does not include homosexual elements, it presents a simple school-themed love story instead that he believes everyone can relate to. He conducted field research by interviewing all-girls school graduates about their views on romance, basing the story on some of their true experiences. Yeung and Ng set the film in 2003, the year they completed their A-Levels during the SARS outbreak, intending to evoke a sense of nostalgia for audiences born in the 1980s and to capture their youth experiences. The directors also intentionally cast inexperienced actors in the lead roles, reflecting their own status as new directors. Over two hundred actresses were auditioned, including some from TVB, with Hedwig Tam and Renci Yeung ultimately selected for their suitability for the characters. Tam was fouled out in the first round before changing her scene partner and showing better chemistry. This film marks her third portrayal of a lesbian character, following The Yuppie Fantasia 3 (2017) and the short film Live On Without Me (2021). She and Yeung participated in acting workshops together to more convincingly portray their intimate relationships in the film. The project was primarily funded by Mei Ah Entertainment and Dreams Salon. Yeung and Ng also joined the First Feature Film Initiative and secured funding from the Hong Kong Film Development Council as part of Operation Greenlight, receiving HK$1,064,000 in 2017.

=== Filming and post-production ===
Principal photography began on 10 August 2018, with Tam, Yeung, Stephen Au, and Willie Wai announced to star. Filming spanned a year and a half and was split into two parts. The first shoot involved 20 scenes, while Yeung and Ng sought advice from industry seniors using the existing footage, and filmed nine additional scenes in the second shoot. Most of the film, set in a secondary school, was shot at FDBWA Szeto Ho Secondary School in Lam Tin, Kwun Tong District. During the shoot, the water system at the school set became contaminated, causing both Tam and Yeung to suffer from acute gastroenteritis and require injections. Editing took another two years, and the film was still in post-production as of September 2021. A scene depicting a close intimacy between Tam and Yeung was cut from the theatrical release. An official trailer was released in October 2021, coinciding with the early bird screenings at the Hong Kong Asian Film Festival, with tickets sold out within the first hour of sales, which Yeung described as "flattering and unexpected". The film features the theme song "My Dear, Best Friend", performed by Eman Lam, composed by Day Tai, with lyrics by Jarita Wan. The music video for the song was released on 12 November 2021 following its premiere.

== Release ==
The First Girl I Loved had its world premiere on 2 November 2021 at the 18th Hong Kong Asian Film Festival, and was theatrically released in Hong Kong on 25 November. The film was later screened in competition at the 17th Osaka Asian Film Festival, the 29th Mardi Gras Film Festival, and the 24th Far East Film Festival. It was also released theatrically in South Korea in April 2022, and in Taiwan on 15 July 2022.

== Reception ==
S. Louisa Wei, writing for HK01, commended The First Girl I Loved for its authentic portrayal of first love and the complexities of lesbian relationships, as well as its emotional depth and the director's ability to capture genuine feelings, particularly in the touching scenes that are based not on screenwriting techniques but on the authenticity of the characters' emotions. Edmund Lee of the South China Morning Post gave the film 2/5 stars, calling it a "corny, naive, and hollow story" due to its heavy-handed writing and underdeveloped main characters, which result in a simplistic portrayal of a lesbian relationship that fails to engage the audience despite its poignant premise of sexual awakening.

Cecilia Wong of The Stand News provided a negative review, stating that the film fails to adopt a lesbian perspective to challenge societal norms or explore the complexities of same-sex desire, instead reinforcing outdated narratives that undermine women's agency and homosexual romantic relationships. Similarly, Chelsea Ma of the Hong Kong Film Critics Society criticized the film for superficially handling complex themes of same-sex love and societal constraints, ultimately reducing the struggles of its characters to a simplistic narrative that fails to authentically represent the realities of lesbian relationships.

== Awards and nominations ==
Year	Award	Category	Nominee	Result	Ref.
2022	17th Osaka Asian Film Festival	Grand Prix	—N/a	Nominated	
2022	17th Osaka Asian Film Festival	ABC TV Award	—N/a	Won	
2022	29th Mardi Gras Film Festival	Audience Award for Best Narrative Feature	—N/a	Won	
2022	24th Far East Film Festival	White Mulberry	Yeung Chiu-hoi, Candy Ng	Nominated	
