= Smashing Frank =

2025 Hong Kong film by Trevor Choi

- Theatrical release poster
- Traditional Chinese: 搗破法蘭克
- Jyutping: Dou^{2} Po^{3} Faat^{3} Laan^{4} Hak^{1}
- Directed by: Trevor Choi
- Written by: Trevor Choi
- Produced by: Charles Yen
- Starring: Hedwig Tam; Locker Lam; Kaki Sham; Renci Yeung; Ben Yuen
- Cinematography: Alfred Pong
- Edited by: Wong Hoi; Daniel Lee
- Music by: Jack Tse
- Production companies: 16By9; Entertainment Power
- Distributed by: Intercontinental Film
- Release date: 17 April 2025 (Hong Kong)
- Running time: 88 minutes
- Country: Hong Kong
- Language: Cantonese

Smashing Frank (Chinese: 搗破法蘭克) is a 2025 Hong Kong heist film directed and written by Trevor Choi. Co-produced by Entertaining Power and the YouTube channel 16By9, it is the first Hong Kong film produced through crowdfunding. The film stars Hedwig Tam, Locker Lam, Kaki Sham, and Renci Yeung as members of the titular heist crew Frank, who engage in robberies targeting the wealthy, only to uncover a larger conspiracy orchestrated by crime lord and billionaire (Ben Yuen).

The screenplay for Smashing Frank was developed by Trevor Choi as part of a filmmaking course taught by Fruit Chan and was completed in early 2019 under Chan's mentorship. In 2021, Choi founded the 16By9 and launched a crowdfunding campaign on Kickstarter on the channel's first anniversary to produce their debut feature film basing on the screenplay of Smashing Frank.

The campaign successfully raised HK$2.5 million in May 2022, but the project faced a creative overhaul due to new investments in April 2023, causing the original cast led by Hanna Chan and Alma Kwok exiting and some backers requesting refunds. Principal photography took place from June to August 2023 with a new cast and experienced a two-year delay in post-production. The film ultimately received its theatrical release in Hong Kong on 17 April 2025.

== Plot ==
A hotel management trainee Ayla witnesses a wealthy guest attempting to rape a teenage girl, but the guest buys his way out of court while Ayla is convicted for assault. She realizes that society often ignores ongoing crimes to maintain stability. Frustrated, she decides to retaliate against society with her boyfriend Hugo. Together, they launch a YouTube channel called "Frank", where they film their robbery heists to post online. As Ayla anticipated, their channel gains only limited views, and mainstream media ignores their activities. During a heist at a jewelry store, they coerce Chun, a truck driver they met during community service, to become their getaway driver. Unknown to them, the jewelry store is owned by billionaire and money launderer Ho. Recently, rumors circulate online about Ho’s church, Unity Haven, a Catholic institution frequented by affluent members of society, allegedly involved in bribery and money laundering. To distract the public, Ho holds a press conference condemning Frank's robberies. After Ho publicizes them, Frank's views skyrocket, and public opinions start connecting them to the previous money laundering allegations, with many urging them to target wealthy church members. Ayla and Hugo decide to investigate the church but struggle to find a way in. Chun suggests they meet someone who might help—Chelsea, a former accomplice of his. Chelsea, angry at Chun for his past abandonment, attempts to blackmail him, but Ayla and Hugo intervene and instead blackmail Chelsea into joining them.

Reluctantly joining the crew, Chelsea proposes they target Hui, Ho's business partner who runs currency exchange chainstores. She seduces Hui and lures him to a hotel room, drugging him while the group uses his phone to signal his staff to transfer laundering money to a waiting truck driven by Chun and Hugo. Ayla records the entire heist from a nearby condo. The plan runs smoothly until the transfer employee hesitates to board the truck, forcing Hugo to take him hostage. When he removes the man's cap, they discover it's Tang, the father of Unity Haven Church, who warns them that the money belongs to Ho and that they are in serious trouble. After regrouping, they realize they have uncovered the money laundering schemes of the wealthy using the church as a front. Ayla threatens Tang to contact Ho for a negotiation. Ho, feigning kindness, offers them a deal, where they can keep the laundering money and an extra $3 million in exchange for Tang. Although Ayla initially agrees under pressure, she becomes furious at Ho's condescension. Chelsea also storms off and confides in Chun that she used their group to expose Hui and Ho, revealing her knowledge of his involvement in human trafficking. Meanwhile, Hugo talks to Tang, who admits he leaked the money laundering rumors online, but was exposed by Ho and forced to transfer the money himself. Unbeknownst to him, Hugo records their conversation and hides the chip in a watch.

Chelsea and Chun go to collect the ransom, with Ayla recording from a nearby condo while Hugo stays with Tang to film the hostage exchange from afar. However, it turns out to be a trap set by Ho. Police flood the area after Chelsea and Chun collect the money, leading to their arrest, and Tang is swiftly killed by a hitman sent by Ho. Witnessing this, Hugo tries to flee but is shot. Before he dies, he calls and tells Ayla to find the chip in his watch. Ayla discovers the evidence of Ho's crimes through Tang's confession. She livestreams the information, exposing the conspiracies and declaring that Frank will continue. People across the city respond by supporting Frank and engaging in copycat heists against wealthy church members.

== Cast ==
- Hedwig Tam as Ayla, an ex-convict and the leader of the heist crew Frank
- Locker Lam as Hugo, Ayla's boyfriend and loyal accomplice
- Kaki Sham as Chun, a truck driver enlisted as Frank's getaway driver
- Renci Yeung as Chelsea, a high-class escort and Chun's former partner-in-crime
- Ben Yuen as Ho Ka-wang, a billionaire and head of Unity Haven Church which he uses as a front for bribery, money laundering, and human trafficking

Also appearing in the film are Yeung Wai-lun as Father Tang, the priest at Unity Haven Church; Henry Chan as K, Ho's hitman; Samuel Yau as Hui Chi-man, Ho's business partner; and Kaying Wong as Ying, a staff member at the currency exchange store.

== Production ==
=== Development ===
In 2018, Trevor Choi quit his job at a bank and returned to Hong Kong from Canada to pursue a career in filmmaking, and attended a filmmaking course hosted by the Hong Kong Film Directors' Guild and taught by Fruit Chan that same year. During the course, Choi worked on an assignment which later evolved into Smashing Frank, with Chan mentoring him on the writing process. The screenplay was completed in early 2019, prior to the 2019–2020 Hong Kong protests. Choi described it as a heist film, a genre that is rare in Hong Kong cinema, and compared it to the American films Ocean's Eleven (2001) and Baby Driver (2017). He also incorporated social themes to the story, such as exploring wealth disparity. Choi aimed to venture into a new genre beyond the typical buddy cop or police films in Hong Kong, drawing inspiration from Fruit Chan's New Wave film Made in Hong Kong (1998). He named the film and the titular heist crew "Frank" as a tribute to Leonardo DiCaprio's character Frank Abagnale in Catch Me If You Can (2002). In 2019, Choi submitted the screenplay to the First Feature Film Initiative but was rejected. He turned to the Hong Kong-Asia Film Financing Forum, presenting the project in 2020, but it still did not attract any investment.

In April 2021, Choi co-founded the YouTube sketch video channel 16By9 with fellow filmmaker Ivan Lo, actor Will Or, and businessman Jason Pun, aiming to provide a platform for young directors and actors to produce their own short films. In April 2022, the channel celebrated its one-year anniversary by launching a crowdfunding campaign to produce their first feature film, aiming to raise HK$2.5 million within 35 days, with a planned release in June 2023. The film marks the first Hong Kong film to be produced through crowdfunding, and was set to be directed by Trevor Choi and produced by Fruit Chan, featuring lead roles for Hanna Chan, Alma Kwok, Yukki Tai, and Kung Chi-yip. The crowdfunding campaign was hosted on Kickstarter, with three tiers for backers contributing HK$160, 300, and 600, respectively. A concept trailer was released also on 20 April, coinciding with the campaign launch, featuring cameo appearances by filmmaker Tin Kai-man and YouTubers from Trial & Error, Corrupt the Youth, and JFFT. Chan, Kwok, Tai, and Kung played a SFX makeup artist, a part-time girlfriend, a medical student, and a hacker, respectively, forming a heist crew targeting the wealthy. Choi explained that he aimed to distance the film's tone from the protests and the pandemic, presenting only a metaphor open to audience interpretation. Choi was inspired to use crowdfunding by the American film Shelby Oaks (2024) by YouTuber Chris Stuckmann and the unproduced Hong Kong film The Young, The Old, and The Rich, although the latter did not succeed due to a significant funding gap. He analyzed the failure of The Young, The Old, and The Rich as stemming from its ambitious goal of HK$10 million, leading him to set a more achievable crowdfunding target of HK$2.5 million against an expected total budget of HK$4.5 million, intending to use the crowdfunding funds as start-up fund to expand the project. The campaign raised over HK$1.56 million with more than 1,900 backers by mid-May, and reached its goal within the same month. After the crowdfunding campaign ended in May, the production team spent the following three months seeking investors to cover the remaining budget.

=== Creative shifts and filming ===
Although the film was initially scheduled for a June 2023 release, it faced significant delays, and the production team did not provide updates on Kickstarter to backers, citing "confidentiality agreements with other involved parties". In April 2023, 16By9 informed backers that the film would undergo a complete cast change, introducing Hedwig Tam, Locker Lam, Kaki Sham, and Renci Yeung as the new main cast, and Fruit Chan also exited the project. The four actors all won their parts through auditions. The production team also did not explain the creative overhaul to the backers, causing some backers to express dissatisfaction with the casting changes, and prompted the production team to announce the option for backers to request refunds. Choi later clarified in an interview with Ming Pao that Hanna Chan and Alma Kwok were only involved for filming the promotional teaser and had not confirmed their casting, and both actresses decided to withdraw after the crowdfunding campaign ended. While Fruit Chan was still actively involved, providing advice one week prior to filming, the limited budget prevented the production team from affording him a producer credit. The table-read and filming were announced to take place in May and June respectively.

Principal photography began on 23 June 2023 in Kwun Tong, with Ben Yuen, Henry Chan, Kaying Wong, and Samuel Yau joining the cast. Filming wrapped in late August. Ming Pao reported that the production team still lacked updates even after filming commenced, and resulted in a two-year delay in post-production. In March 2024, the film was presented at the Hong Kong Filmart, and its first trailer was released on 5 March 2025.

== Release ==
Smashing Frank had its premiere on 20 March 2025, followed by a theatrical release in Hong Kong on 17 April. The film is set to screen in July at the 24th New York Asian Film Festival for its United States Premiere.

== Reception ==
Edmund Lee of the South China Morning Post gave Smashing Frank 3/5 stars, calling it "a portrait of disaffected youth" that reflects the growing generational conflict and wealth gap in Hong Kong through its "morally conflicted protagonists", while praising Hedwig Tam's "ambivalent characterisation" but noting that the thematic depth is somewhat muddled and fails to convey a clear message. Jason Lam of the Hong Kong Film Critics Society noted that the film attempts to adapt Bonnie and Clyde (1967) to a Hong Kong setting but ultimately fails due to "an overly weak screenplay", "especially regarding where the guns come from during the robbery and the directions of shootout scenes being too juvenile", making it forgettable except for Tam's "decent" performance.
