= Weeds on Fire =

2016 Hong Kong film by Steve Chan

- Film poster
- 點五步
- Directed by: Steve Chan Chi-fat
- Written by: Steve Chan Chi-fat; Wong Chi-Yeung
- Produced by: Chan Hing-ka; O Sing-pui
- Starring: Liu Kai-chi; Lam Yiu-sing; Tony Wu
- Narrated by: Jan Lamb
- Cinematography: O Sing-pui
- Edited by: Cheung Cheuk-lam; Stevefat
- Music by: Day Tai
- Production company: Flash Glory
- Distributed by: Golden Scene
- Release dates: 26 March 2016 (HKIFF); 25 August 2016 (Hong Kong)
- Running time: 95 minutes
- Country: Hong Kong
- Language: Cantonese
- Budget: HK$2 million
- Box office: HK$3.82 million

Weeds on Fire (Chinese: 點五步; Jyutping: dim2 ng5 bou6; literally "half a step") is a 2016 Hong Kong film adapted from the true story of the Shatin Martins, the first baseball team from Hong Kong to win a league. The film is directed by Steve Chan Chi-fat and stars Liu Kai-chi, Lam Yiu-sing and Tony Wu. The film was released on 25 August 2016.

== Plot ==
1984 is a year where many changes take place, such as the signing of the Sino-British Joint Declaration as well as the opening of New Town Plaza and the first dragon boat race on Shing Mun River.

Tse Chi-lung "Lung" (Lam Yiu-sing), a resident of Wo Che Estate, and his neighbour and long-time friend Fan Chun-wai "Wai" (Tony Wu) enter Kei Kok College, a lowest-tier secondary school whose students' discipline is notorious in Sha Tin District. Kei Kok's principal, Lu Kwong-fai (Liu Kai-chi), receives fundings from the District Board with the support of District Officer Mr Tsang (Poon Chan-leung) to establish the territory's first Chinese teenage baseball team, which he believes can turn bad students good. Acting also as the coach, Lu recruits Lung, Wai and eight of their fellow schoolmates, who all live under uneasy conditions, to the baseball team named the Shatin Martins. He enforces strict discipline so as to remind the members to work and behave as a team, especially after their first humiliating defeat to a junior team.

Lung often looks up to Wai, who is smarter and physically stronger than him. Wai has started a romantic relationship with his schoolmate Tsz-ching (Hedwig Tam) whereas Lung does not even dare to speak to Ling (Sadie Wang) whom he has a crush on. After Wai is chosen as the pitcher of the Shatin Martins, he takes pride in himself and belittles his teammates. In the first match of the Little League, Wai starts a fight with the rival team, prompting Lu to publicly replace him with Lung. Feeling betrayed by his friend, an ashamed, Wai withdraws from baseball and school, rejoins gang activities and abandons his now-pregnant girlfriend. Lung is at first angry with Lu for alienating Wai, but later reconciles with him. With the departure of the most outstanding member, the Shatin Martins work closer and train harder together, finally winning the tickets to the final of the league.

Right before the final match, Lung experiences several shocks in his life. First, his family is torn apart by his mother's extramarital affairs. Second, although he has summoned the courage to speak to Ling, she has a boyfriend already. Third, he finds out Wai is involved in illegal acts in order to attempt to provide subsidy for Tsz-ching's abortion since she is now on her own after splitting with her family. But she refuses to give up her baby. Lu reminds him to stay focused as the half-a-step he takes at the pitcher's mound will decide the fate of the team.

At the final, the Shatin Martins have a hard match against the Japan-based Buffaloes, being far behind in four innings. Wai cannot keep his promise to show up to support them, as he is performing a dangerous mission. Worried about Wai, Lung fails to concentrate on playing and is hit in the face by the ball struck by the batter. As he falls onto the ground, he realises he must stand up by himself to prove himself capable to Wai. The Shatin Martins manages to come up from behind and eventually wins by 13–12, becoming the first Hong Kong team to win the championship.

Although Wai is seriously injured, he survives and is taken care of at hospital. Lung learns how to adapt to changes, looking to his father and Tsz-ching as examples. Lu remains unmarried and dedicates himself to education and baseball. In recognition of the historic title, the government names a bridge over Shing Mun River after the team.

On the eve of the 30th anniversary of the Shatin Martins, Lung visits the Admiralty Occupy Site during the Umbrella Movement and recalls the spirit of not giving up hope, despite failures.

== Cast ==
- Liu Kai-chi as Lu Kwong-fai, principal of Kei Kok College and coach of the Shatin Martins
- Lam Yiu-sing as Tse Chi-lung
- Tony Wu as Fan Chun-wai
- Hedwig Tam as Tsz-ching, Fan's girlfriend
- Sadie Wang as Ling, Tse's love interest
- Kaki Sham as Chan Keung, member of the Shatin Martins
- Poon Chan-leung as Mr Tsang, Sha Tin District Officer (based on real-life Donald Tsang)

== Production ==
The director Chan Chi-fat (Steve Chan) and scriptwriter Wong Chi-yeung are alumni of the Academy of Film, Hong Kong Baptist University. Chan won the First Feature Film Initiative competition (Higher Education Institutions Group) of Creative Hong Kong in 2013 and was awarded a budget of HK$2 million by the Film Development Fund. Since the budget was insufficient to produce a normal-size commercial film, the crew had to mobilise support from fresh graduates and students of the Academy of Film. Many of the crew and the cast were underpaid or even unpaid.

== Release ==
The film was featured at the 40th Hong Kong International Film Festival in March 2016, where its tickets sold out quickly. It was distributed by Golden Scene and publicly released on 25 August 2016.

== Historical references ==
Based on historical events, Weeds on Fire made some alterations for dramatic purposes. Historical photos and accounts were provided at the epilogue of the film. The historical Shatin Martins was established in 1982 whereas it was altered to 1984 in the film, in order to fit into the timeline of the story. The historical Lu Kwong-fai was the principal of Kei Kok Primary School instead of a secondary school; therefore, the Shatin Martins were formed by primary schoolers rather than teenagers. Mr Tsang, Sha Tin District Officer portrayed by Poon Chan-leung, was based on Donald Tsang, who provided elemental support in the establishment of the team and recalled it as the most memorable event during his service in Sha Tin.

== Awards and nominations ==
| Award ceremony | Category | Recipients | Result |
|---|---|---|---|
| 53rd Golden Horse Awards | Best New Performer | Tony Wu | Nominated |
| 11th Hong Kong Film Directors Guild Awards | Best New Performer | Tony Wu | Won |
| 23rd Hong Kong Film Critics Society Award | Film of Merit | Weeds on Fire | Won |
| 11th Asian Film Awards | Best Newcomer | Tony Wu | Nominated |
36th Hong Kong Film Awards
| 36th Hong Kong Film Awards | Best Film | Weeds on Fire | Nominated |
| 36th Hong Kong Film Awards | Best Supporting Actor | Liu Kai-chi | Nominated |
| 36th Hong Kong Film Awards | Best New Performer | Tony Wu | Won |
| 36th Hong Kong Film Awards | Best New Performer | Hedwig Tam | Nominated |
| 36th Hong Kong Film Awards | Best Cinematography | O Sing-pui | Nominated |
| 36th Hong Kong Film Awards | Best Original Film Score | Day Tai | Nominated |
| 36th Hong Kong Film Awards | Best Original Film Song | "Anthem Of Shatin Martins"; Written by Day Tai and Saville Chan; Performed by Supper Moment | Won |
| 36th Hong Kong Film Awards | Best New Director | Steven Chan Chi-fat | Nominated |
| 17th Chinese Film Media Awards | Best New Performer | Tony Wu | Nominated |

== See also ==
- Kano
- Mad World: Another winner of the 1st First Feature Film Initiative (Higher Education Institutions Group)
- City Without Baseball another baseball themed Hong Kong film
