= Fooling Around Jiang Hu =

2016 Hong Kong film by Lam Chiu-wing

Chinese name
- Traditional Chinese: 江湖悲劇
- Simplified Chinese: 江湖悲剧
- Literal meaning: Jianghu Tragedy
- Jyutping: gong1 wu4 bei1 kek6
- Directed by: Lam Chiu-wing
- Written by: Lam Chiu-wing
- Produced by: Ng Kin Hung; Ricky Fan Chun-Fung
- Starring: Alan Tam; Jaime Chik; Jordan Chan; Christine Ng; Babyjohn Choi; Hedwig Tam; Jacky Cai
- Cinematography: Kubbie Tsoi
- Edited by: Guorong Liang
- Music by: Ronald Ng
- Release date: 1 September 2016 (Hong Kong)
- Running time: 86 minutes
- Country: Hong Kong
- Language: Cantonese
- Box office: HK$300000

Fooling Around Jiang Hu (Chinese: 江湖悲劇, lit. 'Jianghu Tragedy') is a 2016 Hong Kong Triad comedy film directed by Lam Chiu-wing, starring Alan Tam, Jaime Chik, Jordan Chan, Christine Ng, Babyjohn Choi, Hedwig Tam and Jacky Cai.

== Cast ==
- Alan Tam as Golden Alan
- Jaime Chik as Luk Ling
- Jordan Chan as Dragon Mountain
- Christine Ng as Christine
- Babyjohn Choi as Siu Tung
- Hedwig Tam as Rabbit
- Jacky Cai as Moon

== Reception ==
The film received mostly negative reviews. Sina Hong Kong called it "the worst Hong Kong film of 2016" and the South China Morning Post called it an "unfunny, uninspired disaster of a film, which can best be described as a series of largely pointless skits". It received four nominations for Apple Daily's Golden Plum Award (where readers vote on the worst Chinese-language film of the year), with Alan Tam winning Worst Actor.
