= Lost Love (2022 film) =

2022 Hong Kong film by Ka Sing-fung

- Theatrical release poster
- Traditional Chinese: 流水落花
- Literal meaning: Flowing water and falling flowers
- Jyutping: Lau^{4} Seoi^{2} Lok^{6} Faa^{1}
- Directed by: Ka Sing-fung
- Written by: Ka Sing-fung; Lo Kim-fei
- Produced by: Katherine Lee Ka-wai
- Starring: Sammi Cheng; Alan Luk; Hedwig Tam
- Cinematography: Danny Szeto Yat-lui
- Music by: Olivier Cong
- Release dates: 13 November 2022 (HKIFF); 2 March 2023 (Hong Kong)
- Running time: 92 minutes
- Country: Hong Kong
- Language: Cantonese

Lost Love (Chinese: 流水落花) is a 2022 Hong Kong drama film directed by Ka Sing-fung. The film stars Sammi Cheng, Alan Luk, and Hedwig Tam, and centers on a foster family navigating love, loss, and emotional healing. It premiered on 13 November 2022 at the Hong Kong Asian Film Festival as a closing film, and was theatrically released on 2 March 2023.

== Plot ==
After losing her job when her employer failed to secure a contract, Chan Tin-mei (Aunt Mei) and Ho Bun, a married couple applied to become a foster family through the guidance of social worker Miss Mok. Over the course of thirteen years, the couple carefully cares for seven troubled children and teens: Sam, a boy with a drug-addicted mother; Ching, a girl abandoned by her divorced parents; Fleur, a girl born with a cleft lip; Ming, a boy longing for a home; Ka-hei and Ka-long, siblings who have lost trust in adults; and Hang, a foster child preparing to enter university. Tin-mei sees in the children the scars left by parents, peers, and society, and devotes herself to helping them regain hope and become a supportive family.

Although others praise Tin-mei for her devotion, she understands that it is the children who have saved her. Her singular devotion to the children blinds her to Ho Bun's feelings. Haunted by the loss of her own three-year-old son years earlier, she refuses to consider his wish for another pregnancy. Struggling with grief, Tin-mei finds solace and a renewed sense of motherhood through caring for the foster children, temporarily filling the void in her life. When Ho Bun has an affair, it forces a painful confrontation, prompting Tin-mei to realize she has neglected not only her husband but also the deeper emotional needs of the children. Gradually, through the quiet guidance and presence of the foster children, she finds a way to rebuild her relationship with Ho Bun.

As the couple enjoys simple, happy days with Hang, the foster child preparing for university, life brings an unexpected change. One day, on the familiar bridge she visits so often, Tin-mei suddenly collapses, struck by the same fragile heart that took her son. Like flowing water carrying fallen flowers. the journey of life continues, evoking gentle memories of the past.

== Cast ==
- Sammi Cheng as Chan Tin-mei (Aunt Mei), foster mom and wife of Ho Bun.
- Alan Luk as Ho Bun, foster father and husband of Chan Tin-mei.
- Hedwig Tam as Miss Mok, a social worker.
- Sean Wong as Sam, a boy with a drug addict mother.
- Leona Li as Ching, a girl abandoned by her divorced parents.
- Phoebe Ng Tsz-kiu as Fleur, a girl born with cleft lip.
- Matt Jiu Kai-nam as Ming.
- Maya Tsang Yui-tung as Ka-hei, elder sister of Ka-long.
- Tsui Ka-him as Ka-long, younger brother of Ka-hei.
- Gordon Lau as Hang.

Also appearing in the film are Ahfa Wong as the shore owner, Jo Koo as the school bus driver, and Rachel Leung as Ching's mother.

== Production ==
The film marks Ka's debut feature. His previous short films also revolve around family for storytelling, namely A Bird Goes By (2019) and Gai Dan Chai (2019). Inspired by his daughter, he initially wanted to tell a story about the two-way relationship between parents and children, not just the one-sided efforts of the parents. Specifically, children can easily inspire adults to be better through simple actions and words. When researching about the foster care system, Ka was most struck by the impermanence of foster families. Although foster children live like real family members, they must be ready to let go when a child is adopted. This mix of joy and sadness from forming deep attachments and then parting is a defining experience for foster parents. In the film, abrupt black screens separate each story segment, reflecting the suddenness of these farewells—uncomfortable for viewers, but true to the reality of foster care.

The screenplay was co-written by the married couple Ka Sing-fung and Lo Kim-fei, with Lo, a full-time screenwriter, having conceived the plot years before 2019. The initial draft took three months to complete. The story centers on the interplay of familial bonds and mutual influence between adults and children. Rather than focusing on the foster care system or social issues, the film portrays a couple who, through the children who come and go in their lives, channel their grief for their deceased son, allowing life to continue in another form. Sammi Cheng stated that she was drawn to the project because of its natural, understated yet emotionally powerful script, as well as the complexity of her character, who is portrayed without idealization. She also chose to participate without pay in order to support a new director. It was selected as one of the five winning works in the professional group of the 6th First Feature Film Initiative, receiving HK$8 million funding from the Hong Kong Film Development Council's Film Development Fund and Create Hong Kong.

Ka revealed he that had already envisioned the lead actors while writing the script. Having previously collaborated with Alan Luk on Gai Dan Chai, he admired the actor's approach to performance. As Ka put it, "Feel the most, show the least." Ka's family was also closely involved in the production. Not only did his daughter appear in the film, she also created the handwritten Chinese title on the poster. As he noted, he co-wrote the script with his wife and included a role for their daughter, making it a project shared by his entire family.

The film embraces a minimalist aesthetic, with dialogue, narrative, settings, and music all pared down to their essentials. Ka expressed a strong preference for this restrained cinematic language: a simple house inhabited by a changing child, alongside a tree, a river, and a road. For him, the essence of cinema lies in its distinctiveness. Visually, Kam Tin was chosen as the primary filming location both for its connection to real-life foster families in New Territories and to move away from familiar urban imagery. The film features a small communities along Kam Tin River and Po Tei Road (波地路). The small white flowers drifting along the water were carefully chosen as "雀梅," a modest plant with simple petals. Unlike larger, more conspicuous blooms such as Plumeria rubra (雞蛋花) or more vibrant ones like orchids, its appearance serves as a metaphor for children in the story.

== Theme song ==
"Live a Life" is a Cantonese single by Sammi Cheng. The song was composed by Hans Wing, with lyrics by Lin Ruo-ning, arranged by Olivier Cong, and co-produced by Jason Choi @ People Mountain People Sea and Olivier Cong. The theme song plays during the end credits, serving as the true conclusion of the movie.

The single was included in the extended play Dream, released on 14 July 2023.

== Reception ==
=== Critical response ===
Edmund Lee of the South China Morning Post gave Lost Love 4/5 stars, calling it "one of the best performances of [Sammi Cheng's] acting career" and stating that it "calls to mind the work of Hirokazu Koreeda, with the naturalistic performances [Ka Sing-fung] has extracted from his child actors". Derek Elley of Sino-Cinema, however, gave the film 5/10 and wrote that Sammi Cheng "has to carry the movie, which she manages to do but without bringing anything special to the role", and found the film "watchable but rarely engaging" as "she's not helped by direction from Jia Shengfeng that's devoid of any real emotion and has 'arthouse' written all over it".

=== Analysis ===
In the film, water not only creates a sense of natural flow but also mirrors the characters and the unfolding story. The river rises and falls with the seasons, and the comings and goings of the children reflect the passage of time, highlighting the fleeting nature of relationships and the preciousness of chance encounters. Torrential rain symbolizes life's trials and challenges, while gentle rain carries the sorrow and longing for lost loved ones, emotions that cannot be reclaimed. Ultimately, the imagery of "flowing water and falling flowers" evokes life's cycles and the inevitability of parting, conveying that even after loss and pain, life and love endure in new forms. A scene of heavy rain not only heightens the difficulty of rescuing Ka-hei and Ka-long but also emphasizes Ho Bun and Tin-mei's love for the children. On rainy days, Tin-mei often gazes from the terrace, letting raindrops fall slowly on her outstretched hands, as if trying to hold the ungraspable memories of her son. At times, she stares silently at the river they have crossed many times with the foster children, recalling walks with her late child and snapshots taken beneath nearby trees with blooming plums—a quiet, unspoken expression of her enduring grief and love.

== Awards and nominations ==
Year	Award	Category	Nominee	Result	Ref.
2023	29th Hong Kong Film Critics Society Award	Best Film	—N/a	Nominated	
2023	29th Hong Kong Film Critics Society Award	Best Director	Ka Sing-fung	Nominated	
2023	29th Hong Kong Film Critics Society Award	Best Screenplay	Ka Sing-fung, Lo Kim-fei	Nominated	
2023	29th Hong Kong Film Critics Society Award	Best Actress	Sammi Cheng	Won	
2023	29th Hong Kong Film Critics Society Award	Films of Merit	—N/a	Won	
2023	2022 Hong Kong Film Directors' Guild Awards	Best Actress	Sammi Cheng	Won	
2023	41st Hong Kong Film Awards	Best Actress	Sammi Cheng	Won	
2023	41st Hong Kong Film Awards	Best Costume Make Up Design	Man Lim-chung, Vann Kwok In-wai	Nominated	
2023	41st Hong Kong Film Awards	Best Original Film Song	"Live a Life"; Composer: Hans Win; Lyricist: Lin Ruo-ning; Vocal Artist: Sammi Cheng	Won	
2023	25th Far East Film Festival	White Mulberry Award (Special Mention)	Ka Sing-fung	Won	
