= Montages of a Modern Motherhood =

2024 Hong Kong film by Oliver Chan

- Theatrical release poster
- Traditional Chinese: 虎毒不
- Literal meaning: Even a tiger, though cruel, does not
- Jyutping: Fu^{2} Duk^{6} Bat^{1}
- Directed by: Oliver Chan
- Written by: Oliver Chan
- Produced by: Oliver Chan; Lung Kwok-yiu
- Starring: Hedwig Tam; Siuyea Lo; Janis Pang; Patra Au; Alice Fung
- Cinematography: Sou Wai-kin
- Edited by: Emily Leung
- Music by: Olivier Cong
- Production company: No Ceiling Film
- Distributed by: Golden Scene
- Release dates: 7 October 2024 (BIFF); 17 April 2025 (Hong Kong)
- Running time: 111 minutes
- Country: Hong Kong
- Language: Cantonese

Montages of a Modern Motherhood (Chinese: 虎毒不) is a 2024 Hong Kong drama film directed and written by Oliver Chan. Marking Chan's second feature, the film stars Hedwig Tam as Jing, a postpartum mother, alongside Siuyea Lo, Janis Pang, Patra Au, and Alice Fung. It focuses on the first six months after Jing gives birth, exploring the hardships and emotions she experiences while caring for her daughter.

In 2019, Oliver Chan began developing the screenplay after releasing her debut feature Still Human (2018), and she started pitching the film in project markets under the working title Her Lullaby that same year. The writing process spanned approximately three years during the COVID-19 pandemic, while pre-production took less than a year, with principal photography commencing in November 2023 primarily in Yuen Long.

The film had its world premiere in competition for the New Currents Award at the 29th Busan International Film Festival on 7 October 2024, followed by a theatrical release in Hong Kong on 24 April 2025. It received two nominations in the 43rd Hong Kong Film Awards, and Hedwig Tam won a Hong Kong Film Critics Society Award for her performance.

== Plot ==
Jing gives birth to an infant daughter Ching, after longing for a baby for six years with her husband Wai. After her maternity leave, Jing returns to work as a pastry chef at a bakery, while her mother-in-law helps care for Ching during the day. One day, when Jing returns from work early, she discovers her mother-in-law has bathed Ching with a charm paper water, claiming it will make the baby healthier. Even worse, she finds out that her mother-in-law has secretly discarded her breast milk and fed Ching powdered milk instead, justifying it by saying Jing's milk is not good enough and that Ching is lighter than other babies her age. Furious, Jing confronts her mother-in-law, and they both angrily insist that Jing take care of the baby herself. Ching often cries at night and needs Jing's attention, while Wai, seemingly indifferent, refuses to help, claiming he is deprived of sleep and nearly has an accident while working as a truck driver during the day. As a result, Jing suffers from insomnia and makes mistakes at work, leading to her boss's dissatisfaction. She starts looking for daytime nannies and eventually finds Fanny, a retired lady whose family has migrated overseas, which eases her distress.

Jing struggles to pump milk and consults a doctor, discovering she has mastitis and needs medication. During this time, Wai looks after Ching. Jing is laid off by her boss because her male colleague needs to support his family, and the boss believes Jing does not have the same obligations. Wai comforts her and promises to support her and the baby, but Jing wants to work and not give up her independence, especially after hearing from friends about the importance of women having their own financial means. She begins searching for jobs, but many bakeries reject her applications due to her status as a new mother. Worse still, Fanny informs her that she will be migrating to Canada at the end of the month, requiring Jing to find a new nanny. When Jing notices the price of formula milk has increased again, she asks Wai for more household money. He agrees but suggests she consider giving up her job to be a full-time mother until Ching is older. Jing is infuriated by Wai's dismissive attitude, which undermines her autonomy and seems to imply that raising children is solely a mother's responsibility, leading to a clash between them. Later, when Wai hosts friends for a party to introduce them to their newborn, Ching soils her diaper, and Wai leaves Jing to change her while he continues to drink with his friends, further angering her. Unbeknownst to her, Wai is discussing opportunities with a friend who has recently opened a logistics company, hoping for a better salary to support the family.

On Fanny's last day, Jing returns to her childhood home to talk with her mother but is interrupted by her brother's children. As she delays picking up Ching from Fanny, she wanders the streets, contemplating escaping motherhood. However, when she sees a nametag with her and her baby's names, she feels remorse and rushes back to Fanny's place, apologizing to Ching before taking her home. Wai allows his mother to care for Ching while he takes Jing to the beach to relax. He informs her about his transition to the new company and his plans to have another child, asking Jing to stay home and promising to help her open her dream bakery once their children are older. Jing hesitates to respond. At last, Jing takes Ching to a riverside near their home, dreaming of her daughter growing up and graduating from university, and recalling her own hopes for Ching's health and happiness before she was born.

== Cast ==
- Hedwig Tam as Jing, a postpartum mother who works at a bakery
- Siuyea Lo as Wai, Jing's "clueless and insensitive" husband who works as a driver
- Janis Pang as Mei-fung, Wai's mother
- Patra Au as Jing's mother
- Alice Fung as Fanny, a nanny who cares for Ching

Also appearing in the film are Tai Bo as Wai's father, along with Johnny Hui and Annie Man as Jing's elder brother and sister-in-law. The infant daughter Ching is portrayed by six different newborn babies on set, with each baby varying slightly in age to represent Ching from birth to six months old.

== Production ==
=== Development ===
"I hope that my film can make all the mothers out there feel supported, and let them know that they're not alone if they're facing hardships similar to those portrayed in the film, and that there can be joy and sweetness in this special life stage of motherhood. I've had so many ethical dilemmas—I don't want to trigger mothers, but I also want to make sure the film is realistic and creates space for the public to discuss these unspoken issues."

— Oliver Chan on the themes of Montages of a Modern Motherhood

In 2019, director-screenwriter Oliver Chan began writing the screenplay for Montages of a Modern Motherhood after completing production on her debut feature Still Human (2018). She said that the project was inspired by her changing views on motherhood after giving birth. She observed that some filmmakers assumed she would quit filmmaking or be unavailable for work due to her new responsibilities as a mother, prompting her to reflect on how Hong Kong society often emphasizes matriarchy and expects women to automatically take on the role of primary caregivers. To research for the screenplay, Chan studied child abuse cases by attending court hearings, reading online forums, academic journals, and news articles on the topic, which she described as "a montage for her script". She set the screenplay during the first six months after the baby's birth, as she found that period particularly challenging. Initially titled Her Lullaby, Chan began pitching the screenplay that same year. The project was presented at the Golden Horse Project Promotion in September 2020, and at the Hong Kong-Asia Film Financing Forum in March 2021, winning the HAF Fiction Award. She later named the film "虎毒不" in Chinese, derived from the idiom "虎毒不食子" (Even a tiger, though cruel, does not eat its children), explaining that she omitted "食子" (eat its children) to fit the film's open ending. For the English title, she emphasized the word "Modern", as she believed the struggles faced by the protagonist were unique to contemporary women. Development of the screenplay took place over two to three years during the COVID-19 pandemic. The original draft was described as "more brutal", focusing on a mother facing trials and imprisonment, but she scrapped it after becoming a mother herself. Chan initially adopted a tragic approach based on real-life incidents, aiming to convey a sense of hopelessness, but after overcoming her own depression, she found joy in motherhood and decided not to burden the audience or the mothers watching with additional despair. Chan designed the protagonist Jing as a pastry chef, citing reasons due to a play on the English terms "breadwinner" and "bun in the oven", and reflecting her fondness for Hong Kong pastries and a desire to document this declining industry. She also avoided demonizing men in her portrayal of Jing's husband, who she described as a "competent father", and the character's conflict arises solely from differing expectations between him and Jing, a common issue many new couples face which Chan discovered during her research. Chan described the film's dialogue as "very Hong Kong", but emphasized that the emotional conflicts depicted are universal, aiming to use a local story to explore issues that resonate with people both within and outside of Hong Kong.

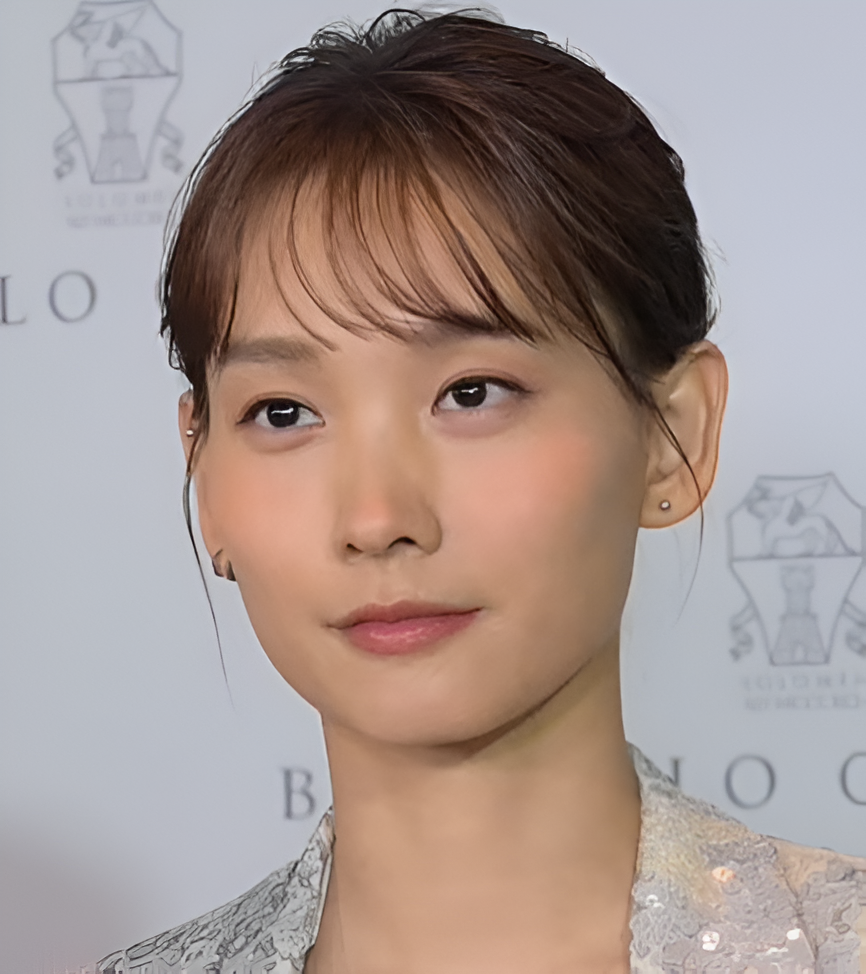
Hedwig Tam, who plays Jing

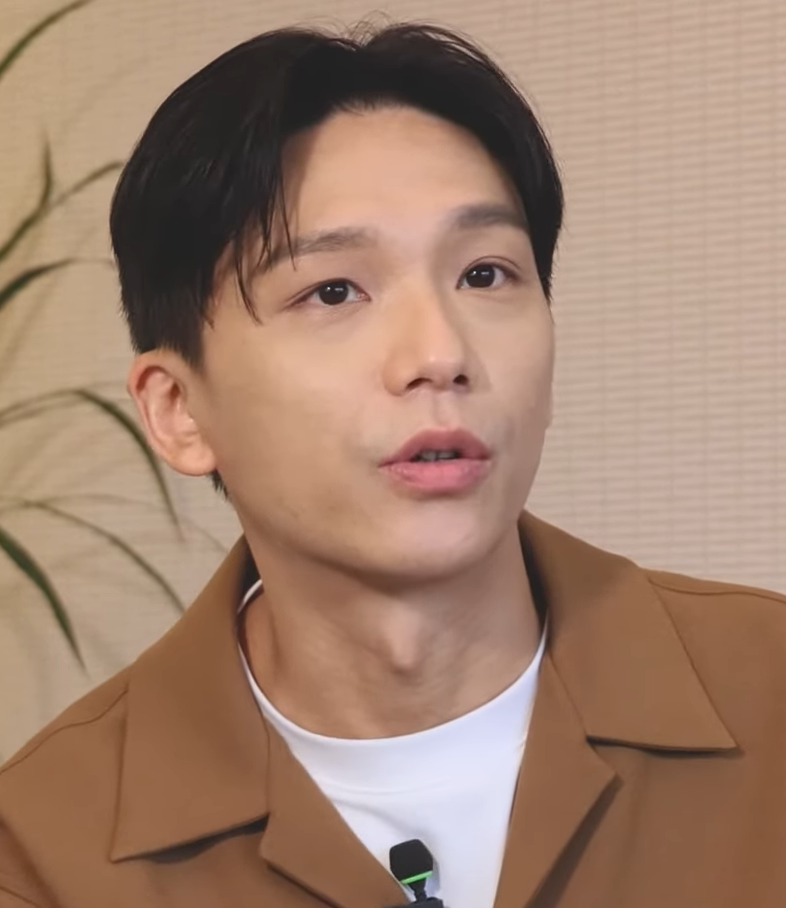
Siuyea Lo, who plays Wai

Pre-production took less than a year after securing funding from an independent investor, which was later revealed to be businesswoman and radio personality Winnie Yu, contributing approximately HK$7 million. (Note: Roy Tsui, founder of 100Most and a friend of Winnie Yu, estimated that she may have funded between HK$8 million and HK$10 million for the project.) Chan opened auditions for Jing to actresses who had and had not given birth. Hedwig Tam, who has neither given birth nor has plans to, was officially cast by Chan six months after her audition. Chan chose Tam because she excelled at conveying depressive emotions, particularly in the numerous crying scenes present in the original screenplay. To emphasize the maternal aspects of the character, Chan had Tam cut her hair short and wear dark-colored costumes, creating a contrast between the character's fatigue and Tam's stylish appearance. To prepare for her role, Tam gained 20 pounds starting in September 2023, two months before filming, to reflect the body of a postpartum mother. She researched postpartum depression by reading books and watching films, and interviewed doctors and experienced mothers to learn about caring for newborns. Fellow actress Jennifer Yu, who had just given birth, also invited her to stay at her house to learn about parenting and breastfeeding, including letting Tam to practice with her baby, and to share her conflicts with her mother-in-law. Tam's co-star Siuyea Lo, who plays a father unfamiliar with parenting, was advised by Chan not to join parenting classes or read too much about it, and he only accompanied Tam to one tutorial at Yu's house before filming. Lo initially also intended to build muscle before shooting, but he experienced a serious illness for several months and resulted in him becoming even thinner, which he later found the physique more fitting for his character. The film includes a nude scene featuring Tam's character, which used prosthetics to simulate the effect, as Tam had not been pregnant and could not create stretch marks on her skin.

=== Filming and post-production ===
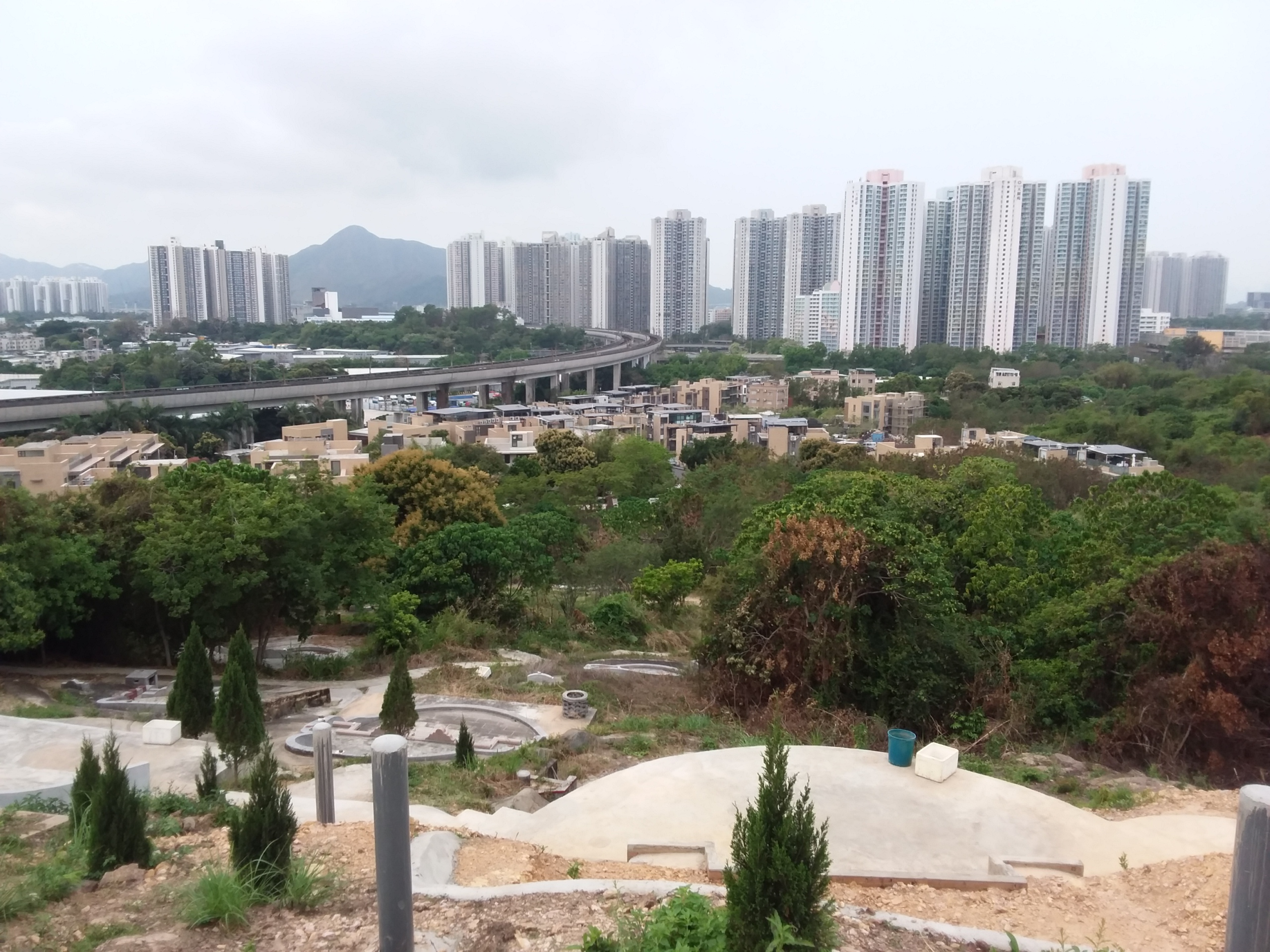
Montages of a Modern Motherhood was mainly filmed at a villa in Yuen Long

Principal photography began in November 2023, with Chan inviting Macanese cinematographer So Wai-kin to helm the shoot. Filming primarily took place in Yuen Long, spanning two weeks in winter, where Wai's family house was located in the film. Chan explained that she set the protagonists in a villa to reflect the culture of Walled villages of Hong Kong, which traditionally favored males over females. Chan and So also reached a consensus to adopt a wide-screen aspect ratio for the film, ensuring that Hedwig Tam was always at the center of the frame. Six different newborn babies were used to portray the infant daughter Ching in the film, requiring the filming schedule to accommodate their needs, such as allowing time for feeding and napping, with Chan noted that a significant amount of time on set was spent waiting for the babies to wake up or sleep. A courtroom scene was filmed but ultimately scrapped, with some of Tam's dialogues redistributed to other scenes in the film, including a monologue where she shares her experiences of change after becoming a mother with Fanny (played by Alice Fung) in the middle of the film.

Post-production took place in Kwun Tong, with sound design supervised by Taiwanese designers Tu Duu-chih and Chiang Yi-chen. More than 70% of the film features real baby cries recorded by the crew, which Chan described as a "difficult technical challenge", having to balance the volume of the cries with the characters' dialogues, especially during overlapping scenes. The production team intentionally adjusted some sound levels to overlap with dialogues and allowed certain noises to emerge during moments of silence, creating a sense of constant distress for mothers. In March 2024, the film was showcased at the Hong Kong-Asia Film Financing Forum, where it won the WIP Award. Golden Scene acquired the worldwide distribution rights to the film in August 2024 ahead of its premiere at Busan.

== Release ==
Montages of a Modern Motherhood had its world premiere in competition for the New Currents Award at the 29th Busan International Film Festival on 7 October 2024, with Hedwig Tam and Siuyea Lo attending the industry exchange event Hong Kong Night in person. It was subsequently screened in the newly established Women's Empowerment section at the 37th Tokyo International Film Festival, and competed for the NETPAC Award at the 2024 Golden Horse Film Festival. The film had its Hong Kong premiere in the Gala section at the 49th Hong Kong International Film Festival in Tsim Sha Tsui on 12 April 2025, followed by a theatrical release in Hong Kong on 24 April. It was also screened in competition at the 27th Far East Film Festival.

== Reception ==
=== Box office ===
Montages of a Modern Motherhood made around HK$2.3 million after two weeks, with Ming Pao estimating the total gross is unlikely to break even.

=== Critical response ===
Frank Scheck of The Hollywood Reporter found Montages of a Modern Motherhood to be a "powerful yet uncomfortable" film that empathetically portrays the "harrowing" hardships faced by new mothers, particularly through Hedwig Tam's "superb" and deeply emotional performance, but noted that it may not resonate with all audiences, especially those experiencing pregnancy, due to its intense emotional themes. Edmund Lee of the South China Morning Post gave the film 3/5 stars, praising Tam's performance as "nuanced" and describing it as a "meticulously observed and wonderfully acted drama" that effectively highlights the struggles of new motherhood and realistically portrays maternity within a patriarchal Chinese society, but lamented that it falls short due to Chan's overly monotonous determination to depict women's hardships with an unrealistic narrative full of worst-case scenarios and a "lack of engaging characters".

Wendy Ide of Screen International described the film as "sensitively acted and directed", noting that it "evocatively captures the bone-deep exhaustion of new motherhood" while exploring the identity struggles faced by women in Hong Kong society, though it offers little new insight into the anxieties of maternal responsibility. Ho Tak of Harper's Bazaar expressed a similar opinion, describing the film as a profoundly immersive and painful exploration of postpartum depression due to Tammy Tam's standout performance, which conveys a range of emotions effectively and naturally, although it ultimately presents a bleak and one-dimensional view of the protagonist's struggles that challenges the audience's emotional resilience.

Calvin Choi, writing for am730, offered a rather negative review and believed that the film presents a bleak portrayal of motherhood, emphasizing that the protagonist's choices lead to despair rather than hope, and underscores the importance of personal agency in shaping one's own sense of hope rather than relying on fictional narratives. Alex Chung of HK01, while highlighting Hedwig Tam's outstanding performance and the vivid portrayal of Jing's emotional turmoil, found that the film's oppressive atmosphere may leave audiences feeling burdened rather than uplifted, despite its artistic progress from the director's previous film Still Human (2018).

== Awards and nominations ==
| Year | Award | Category | Nominee | Result | Ref. |
|---|---|---|---|---|---|
| 2024 | 29th Busan International Film Festival | New Currents Award | —N/a | Nominated | |
| 2024 | 61st Golden Horse Awards | NETPAC Award | —N/a | Won | |
| 2025 | 31st Hong Kong Film Critics Society Awards | Best Actress | Hedwig Tam | Won | |
| 2025 | 43rd Hong Kong Film Awards | Best Actress | Hedwig Tam | Nominated | |
| 2025 | 43rd Hong Kong Film Awards | Best Supporting Actor | Siuyea Lo | Nominated | |
| 2025 | 27th Far East Film Festival | Golden Mulberry | —N/a | Nominated | |
