= Kaki Sham =

Hong Kong actor (born 1990)

- 岑珈其
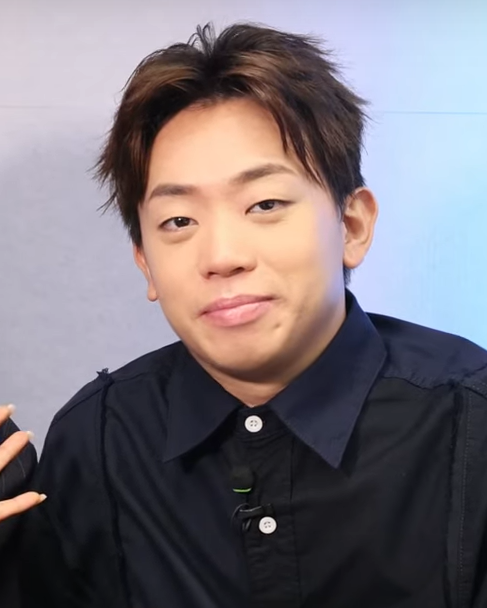
- Sham in January 2024
- Born: Sham Ka-ki; 1990 (age 35–36); Hong Kong
- Occupation: Actor
- Years active: 2008–present
- Spouse: Unknown (m. 2020)
- Children: 1

Kaki Sham Ka-ki (Chinese: 岑珈其; born 1990) is a Hong Kong actor and a founding member of the sketch comedy YouTube channel Trial & Error. He gained public recognition for his supporting role as Chan Keung in the sports film Weeds on Fire (2016), and rose to prominence with leading roles in Distinction (2018), Limited Education (2019), Leap Day (2020), and Far Far Away (2021). In 2022, he was nominated for Best Supporting Actor in the 4th Asia Content Awards for his performance in the ViuTV comedy series In Geek We Trust.

== Early life ==
Sham was born in 1990. He grew up in Tuen Mun and lived at San Wai Court with five siblings. He aspired to become an actor since primary school after watching the 1995 film Full Throttle, citing his desire to "try different lives". He attended San Wui Commercial Society Secondary School, where he was classmates with actor Lam Yiu-sing. During his school years, he considered himself "deviant", having skipped classes, smoked, and even been arrested once. In 2007, Sham was discovered by film director Heiward Mak on a sports field when Mak was conducting field research for a feature film. Along with Lam Yiu-sing, he was invited by Mak to star in her film High Noon, released in 2008, marking his acting debut at age 16. This experience strengthened his interest to pursue an acting career, although he faced a two-year hiatus without any film roles, which he attributed to his young age making him unsuitable for many characters. During that time, he held various jobs, including truck driver, salesman, renovation worker, real estate agent, insurance agent, and shopkeeper of a barbecue park. At 18, Sham directed a short film Hope at Mak's suggestion, documenting the daily routines of him and his family after his Form 5 graduation, which won the Gold Prize in the 14th ifva Awards.

== Career ==
In 2012, Sham joined Mak's newly founded talent agency Dumb Youth, and began taking minor roles in RTHK television series and student film projects. In 2013, he starred in a lead role as Char Siu in the segment "Hide and Seek" of the horror film Tales of the Dark 2, directed by Lawrence Ah Mon, and appeared in Mak's 2014 romantic comedy Uncertain Relationship Society. He received his breakout role as Chen Keung, a talkative member of the protagonist baseball team, in the sports drama film Weeds on Fire, which brought him public recognition. Initially not cast in the film, he joined the cast's baseball training alongside his friend and the male lead Lam Yiu-sing, and impressed director Steve Chan, who created a character for him. In 2017, he had a supporting role in the crime film Dealer/Healer, and played a main role as Sing, a friendly young prisoner, in With Prisoners. He also began developing a television career with a recurring role in ViuTV romance series 3X1. In 2018, he landed his first male lead role in Distinction as Ka-ho, a student labeled problematic due to family issues. Kelly Ho of South China Morning Post praised the lead cast as "incredible" and "effortlessly brought [each character] to life", while Elizabeth Kerr of The Hollywood Reporter noted that Sham's performance compensated for the rapid character revelations in the script. He also portrayed younger versions of Eric Kot and Jordan Chan in Tracey and Golden Job respectively, and starred in the web series Hong Kong West Side Stories and Demon's Path.

In 2019, Sham received his first main television role in ViuTV's school-themed drama Limited Education, playing an inept student running for student union president. The following year, he had a supporting lead role as Brazil Turtle in Leap Day, and starred as a real estate agent in Who Sells Bricks in Hong Kong. He also portrayed Kevin, an autistic youth who serves as a plot device to break the fourth wall, in The Gutter (TV series), a role that director-screenwriter Norris Wong tailored specifically for him. The same year, he became one of six hosts of ViuTV's variety program be ON game, which received positive viewership, and returned to host its second and third seasons in 2022 and 2023. He co-founded the sketch comedy YouTube channel Trial & Error at the invitation of Neo Yau in 2020, and became a recurring actor on the channel, debuting with a parody short film of Reservoir Dogs.

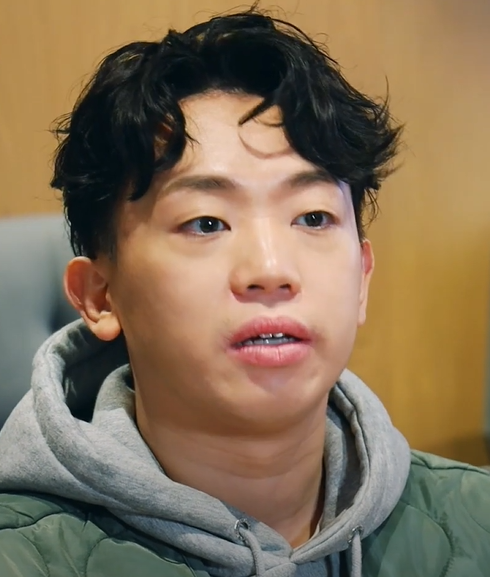
Sham interviewed by Am730 in August 2022

In 2021, Sham took on his first sole male lead role in the romance film Far Far Away, portraying a timid geek romantically involved with five women, which Edmund Lee acknowledged Sham's casting as an "unlikely ladies' man" in his South China Morning Post review. He also had leading roles in the romantic comedies Ready o/r Knot and P.T.G.F. In 2022, Sham starred as Kenneth Chiu in the ViuTV comedy series In Geek We Trust, earning a nomination for Best Supporting Actor in the 4th Asia Content Awards. He also reprised his role as Brazil Turtle in the sequel series 940920, appeared as the main villain in The Parents League, and played a close friend of Keung To's character in the drama film Mama's Affair. In 2023, he returned in Ready o/r Knot's sequel Ready or Rot and portrayed the son of Simon Yam's character in the crime drama The Goldfinger, while also starring as mediator Chung Shun-lap in Beyond the Common Ground and as a solicitor in the legal drama Legal Affair.

== Personal life ==
In November 2020, Sham married his girlfriend after dating for five years. In January 2021, the couple welcomed their son.

== Filmography ==
=== Film ===
Year	Title	Role	Notes/Ref.
2008	High Noon	Chan Ka-ho (陳家浩)	
2013	Tales from the Dark 2	Char-siu (叉燒)	Segment: Hide and Seek
2014	Uncertain Relationship Society	Lee Wing-kin (李永健)	
2016	Weeds on Fire	Chan Keung (陳強)	
2017	Dealer/Healer	Hung (阿洪)	
2017	With Prisoners	Sing (趙溢星)	
2017	Our Time Will Come	Guerilla member	
2018	Napping Kid	Wong Chiu (王朝)	
2018	Distinction	Ka-ho (吳珈豪)	
2018	When Sun Meets Moon	Siu Ming (小明)	
2018	Men On The Dragon	Bao Seed (爆Seed)	Cameo
2018	Tracey	Young Chi Chun (池俊)	
2018	Golden Job	Young Crater (火山)	
2019	The Lady Improper	Fatty (阿肥)	Cameo
2019	Fagara	Real estate salesman	Cameo
2019	My Prince Edward	Keung (強仔)	
2021	My Indian Boyfriend	Kong	
2021	Ready o/r Knot	Cheng Wai-kin (鄭偉健)	
2021	One Second Champion	Policeman	Cameo
2021	P.T.G.F	Leung (良仔)	
2021	Far Far Away	Hau (邱志厚)	
2022	Mama's Affair	Ka Kei (家麒)	
2022	Let It Ghost	Director	
2023	Ready or Rot	Cheng Wai-kin	
2023	Time Still Turns the Pages	Father on street	Cameo; deleted scenes
2023	The Goldfinger	Johnny Tsang (曾永年)	
2024	Deliverance	Ho Ka-kei (何珈其)	Cameo
2024	The Last Dance	Dominic's brother	Deleted scenes
2025	My Best Bet	Kei (阿奇)	Cameo
2025	Smashing Frank	Chun (陶俊)	

=== Television ===
Year	Title	Role	Notes/Ref.
2014	Below the Lion Rock	Lee Wing-kin (李永健)	Guest role
2016	3X1	Fai (輝哥)	Recurring role
2018	Hong Kong West Side Stories	Koo	Main role
2018	Demon's Path	Yu Yik-sham (余亦琛)	Recurring role
2019	Haters Gonna Stay	Chau's friend	Cameo
2019	Limited Education	Mak Ho-yin (麥浩賢)	Main role
2020	Leap Day	Pak "Brazil Turtle" Sai-kai (白世繼/巴西龜)	Recurring role
2020	The Gutter (TV series)	Kevin	Recurring role
2020	Who Sells Bricks in Hong Kong	Tang Man-ying (鄧文英)	Recurring role
2022	In Geek We Trust	Chiu Ka-chun (趙家俊)	Main role
2022	940920	Pak "Brazil Turtle" Sai-kai	Recurring role
2022	The Parents League	Johnny Leung (梁嘉進)	Main role
2022	Lovesignal	Keung (阿強)	Recurring role
2022	We Got Game	Richard	Co-starring
2023	Killing Procedures	Kyle	Guest role
2023	Beyond the Common Ground	Chung Shun-lap (鍾信立)	Main role
2023	Tales at the Corner	Cheung Tsz-chun (張子俊)	Main role
2023	Legal Affair	Benni	Main role

== Awards and nominations ==
Year	Award	Category	Work	Result	Ref.
2022	4th Asia Contents Awards	Best Supporting Actor	In Geek We Trust	Nominated	
