= Oliver Chan =

Hong Kong filmmaker (born 1987)

- 陳小娟
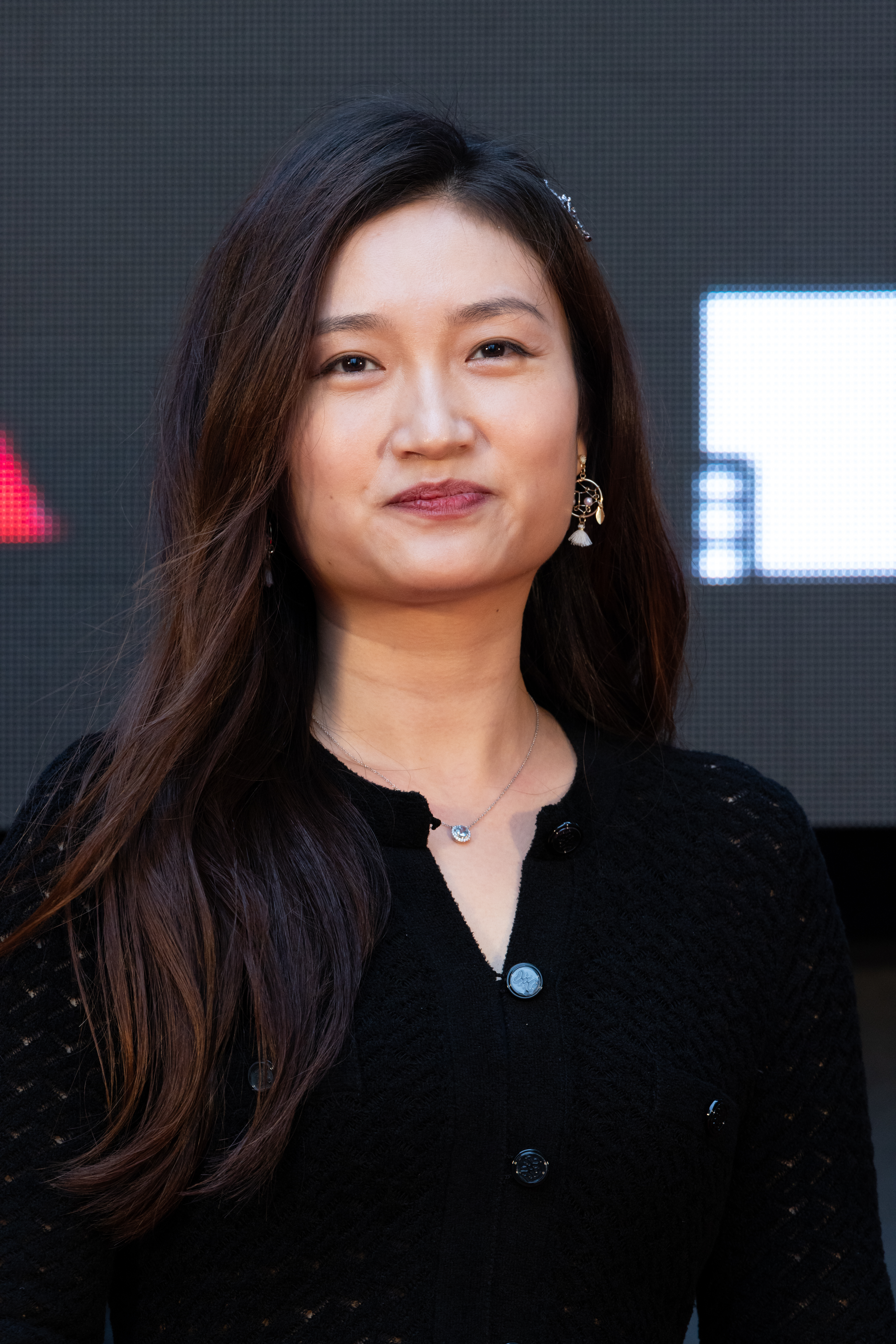
- Chan at the 2024 TIFF
- Born: Chan Siu-kuen; 11 November 1987 (age 38); Hong Kong
- Education: Chinese University of Hong Kong (BBA); Hong Kong Baptist University (MA)
- Occupations: Director; Screenwriter
- Years active: 2016–present
- Children: 1

Oliver Chan Siu-kuen (Chinese: 陳小娟; born 11 November 1987) is a Hong Kong filmmaker. She made her directorial debut with Still Human (2018), which earned her an Asian Film Award and a Hong Kong Film Award.

== Early life and education ==
Chan was born on 11 November 1987 in Hong Kong. She chose the English name Oliver, inspired by the titular character from Charles Dickens's novel Oliver Twist. She is the second child, with a sister seven years older than her, and her father abandoned the family upon her birth after discovering she was a girl. Chan grew up with her mother and sister in Oi Man Estate, Ho Man Tin, and later moved to another public housing estate in To Kwa Wan. She described her family's financial situation as poor, often having to scavenge to support them during her childhood. When she was five, her mother became paralyzed, and the family relied on the government's Comprehensive Social Security Assistance scheme thereafter. Chan developed an interest in television and aspired to be a film director after participating in the production of Educational Television. However, due to financial constraints, she initially planned to become a doctor to help support her family.

Chan attended Carmel Secondary School, where she took science subjects, achieving 4A4B in HKCEE and 2A3B in HKALE. While applying for JUPAS, she ultimately prioritized global business over medicine and dentistry, drawn to the program's flexible curriculum that allowed for exchanges abroad, and enrolled in the Global Business program at the Chinese University of Hong Kong. After graduation, she took a gap year to go on a working holiday in New Zealand, Sapporo, and Tibet. Upon returning to Hong Kong, she worked as a management trainee at Hang Seng Bank. After completing her three-year traineeship, Chan decided to leave her job to pursue a Master of Arts in Producing for Film, Television, and New Media at Hong Kong Baptist University, where she studied for three years alongside fellow filmmaker Norris Wong. During her studies, she worked part-time as a tutor, saleswoman, and teaching assistant to make a living. She graduated in 2015 and formed her own advertisement company.

== Career ==
While pursuing her master's degree, Chan entered several short film competitions and applied to be a writing assistant for various projects, including the ViuTV series 3X1 and six film projects that ultimately did not proceed. Frustrated by the lack of production opportunities, she decided to become a film director herself to gain more control over the filmmaking process. She applied for the First Feature Film Initiative with a screenplay that later became Still Human, winning as part of the third wave. The film was shot in 2018 and released in 2019, with Fruit Chan as producer and Anthony Wong as the lead. Fionnuala Halligan of Screen Daily praised Chan's "deft writing" with "strong local flavour" and called Still Human "a real Hong Kong treat"; while Justin Lowe from The Hollywood Reporter commended her for excellent portrayal the "precarious lives of overseas Filipino workers with compassion and insight". Chan won Best New Director in the 13th Asian Film Awards and Best New Director in the 38th Hong Kong Film Awards for the film.

After winning the Hong Kong Film Award in 2019, Chan was invited to join a 10-episode television production as a screenwriter, which later evolved into the romantic fantasy series Leap Day. In a social media post from June 2024, Chan stated she was removed from the team after submitting the full 10-episode screenplay once funding was secured, and she accused the production crew of using her name to scout locations without compensation or credit. However, the series creator Steve Law later rebuted on social media, claiming Chan had only submitted five episodes before voluntarily resigning due to her pregnancy, and explained that the crew retained her credit early in the project to honor her contributions but later removed it with Chan's approval in September 2019. Shortly after completing Still Human, Chan began working on her second feature Montages of a Modern Motherhood, funded by businessman Winnie Yu. The film revolves around a postpartum mother, inspired by Chan's personal experiences. Frank Scheck from The Hollywood Reporter praised her "deeply empathetic depiction" of a new mother; while Edmund Lee of the South China Morning Post found the screenplay "single-minded, borderline monotonous", contrasting sharply with her heartwarming debut.

== Personal life ==
Chan married in 2016, and gave birth to a son in November 2019.

== Filmography ==
Year	Title	Director	Screenwriter	Editor	Notes
2016	3X1	No	Yes	No	Television series
2018	Still Human	Yes	Yes	Yes	
2020	Leap Day	No	Yes	No	Television series; uncredited
2024	Montages of a Modern Motherhood	Yes	Yes	No	

== Awards and nominations ==
Year	Award	Category	Work	Result	Ref.
2019	13th Asian Film Awards	Best New Director	Still Human	Won	
2019	25th Hong Kong Film Critics Society Awards	Best Screenplay	Still Human	Won	
2019	12th Hong Kong Film Directors' Guild Awards	Best New Director	Still Human	Won	
2019	38th Hong Kong Film Awards	Best Director	Still Human	Nominated	
2019	38th Hong Kong Film Awards	Best Screenplay	Still Human	Nominated	
2019	38th Hong Kong Film Awards	Best New Director	Still Human	Won	
