= Still Human =

2018 Hong Kong film by Oliver Chan

- Official film poster
- Traditional Chinese: 淪落人
- Simplified Chinese: 沦落人
- Hanyu Pinyin: Lúnluòrén
- Jyutping: leon4 lok6 jan4
- Directed by: Oliver Chan
- Written by: Oliver Chan
- Produced by: Fruit Chan
- Starring: Anthony Wong
- Cinematography: Derek Siu
- Edited by: Oliver Chan
- Music by: Austin Chau
- Production company: No Ceiling Film
- Distributed by: Golden Scene Company
- Release dates: 6 November 2018 (HKAFF); 11 April 2019 (Hong Kong)
- Running time: 111 minutes
- Country: Hong Kong
- Language: Cantonese
- Box office: HK$19,811,169

Still Human (Chinese: 淪落人) is a 2018 Hong Kong comedy-drama film directed and written by Oliver Chan in her feature film directorial debut. It stars veteran actor Anthony Wong and Crisel Consunji in her film debut. The film chronicles the relationship between a man using a wheelchair and his Filipina domestic helper. The film had its world premiere at the 15th Hong Kong Asian Film Festival on 6 November 2018 before it was theatrically released on 11 April 2019.

The film received positive critical reception upon release. It was the best selling film in Hong Kong at the week of its release, making over US$940,000 in a weekend. At the 38th Hong Kong Film Awards, it took home three awards, including Wong's third Best Actor win after 20 years.

== Plot ==
A paralyzed and hopeless Hong Kong man, Leung Cheong-wing, meets his new Filipina domestic worker Evelyn Santos, a former nurse who has put her dream of being a photographer on hold and come to the city to earn a living. The two strangers live under the same roof through different seasons, and as they learn more about each other, they also learn more about themselves. Together, they learn how to face the different seasons of life.

== Cast ==
- Anthony Wong as Leung Cheong-wing (梁昌榮)
- Crisel Consunji as Evelyn Santos
- Sam Lee as Fai Cheung (張輝)
- Cecilia Yip as Leung Jing-ying (梁晶瑩)

== Production ==
The Government of Hong Kong runs the First Feature Film Initiative, which funds winners' first feature film. Oliver Chan won the prize in the Higher Education Institution Group in 2017 with Still Human, and was awarded $3.25 million HKD. The film was produced by No Ceiling Film.

Chan sent Anthony Wong an email pitching the film with low expectations, but Wong agreed to take the part with no pay. Consunji auditioned for her role after reading about it in a Facebook ad.

== Social impact ==
There are over 370,000 foreign domestic helpers, otherwise known as migrant workers, in Hong Kong as of 2017. They mainly come from Indonesia and the Philippines. Their condition has been scrutinised by human rights groups as cases of abuse have been reported, in addition to poor living conditions, ill-treatment from employers, and everyday discrimination. This film is the first in Hong Kong to have a migrant worker as a leading character, and has sparked discussions about their lives in the city.

Accepting Best New Performer at the 38th Hong Kong Film Awards, Crisel Consunji said "in Hong Kong, when we celebrate our diversity, we move forward together", and thanked "all the women who bravely shared with [her] their stories", calling them "modern heroes". She delivered parts of her speech in Cantonese, English and Tagalog.

== Awards ==
Award ceremony	Category	Recipient	Result
13th Asian Film Awards	Best New Director	Oliver Chan	Won
25th Hong Kong Film Critics Society Award	Best Film	Still Human	Nominated
25th Hong Kong Film Critics Society Award	Best Director	Oliver Chan	Nominated
25th Hong Kong Film Critics Society Award	Best Screenplay	Oliver Chan	Won
25th Hong Kong Film Critics Society Award	Best Actor	Anthony Wong	Won
25th Hong Kong Film Critics Society Award	Best Actress	Crisel Consunji	Nominated
25th Hong Kong Film Critics Society Award	Films of Merit	Still Human	Won
38th Hong Kong Film Awards	Best Film	Still Human	Nominated
38th Hong Kong Film Awards	Best Director	Oliver Chan	Nominated
38th Hong Kong Film Awards	Best Screenplay	Oliver Chan	Nominated
38th Hong Kong Film Awards	Best New Director	Oliver Chan	Won
38th Hong Kong Film Awards	Best Actor	Anthony Wong	Won
38th Hong Kong Film Awards	Best Actress	Crisel Consunji	Nominated
38th Hong Kong Film Awards	Best New Performer	Crisel Consunji	Won
38th Hong Kong Film Awards	Best Supporting Actor	Sam Lee	Nominated
21st Far East Film Festival	Audience Award (first place)	Still Human	Won
21st Far East Film Festival	Black Dragon Award	Still Human	Won

== Reception ==
=== Critical reception ===
For The Philippine Reporter, Ysh Cabana wrote "Still Human is an earnest reminder of the healing power of empathy, which is what connects humans to other persons. But at a deeper sense of meaning, it is a uncompromising look at the conditions of the people in the margins of a modern city, estranged from themselves as a consequence of living in class society." Edmund Lee of the South China Morning Post rated the film 3.5 of 5 stars. Lee praised Oliver Chan and stated that Still Human "is one of those rare gems of a film which takes a distinctly Hong Kong scenario and turns it into a gently comical drama with universal appeal."

Fionnuala Halligan of Screen Daily wrote that Oliver Chan "clearly works well with actors" and praised Consunji's performance.

Justin Lowe of The Hollywood Reporter praised Chan as a writer who "excels at portraying the often precarious lives of overseas Filipino workers with compassion and insight." However, he cited that the main character "Leung's sudden about-face in his treatment of Evelyn represents the narrative’s obvious weak point".

=== Box office ===
Still Human grossed HK$19,811,169 at the Hong Kong box office during its theatrical run from 11 April to 3 July 2019, making it the fifth highest-grossing domestic of the year in the territory.

== See also ==
- A Simple Life, 2011 Hong Kong film also centred on a caregiver
