= Lam Yiu-sing =

Hong Kong actor (born 1988/1989)

- 林耀聲
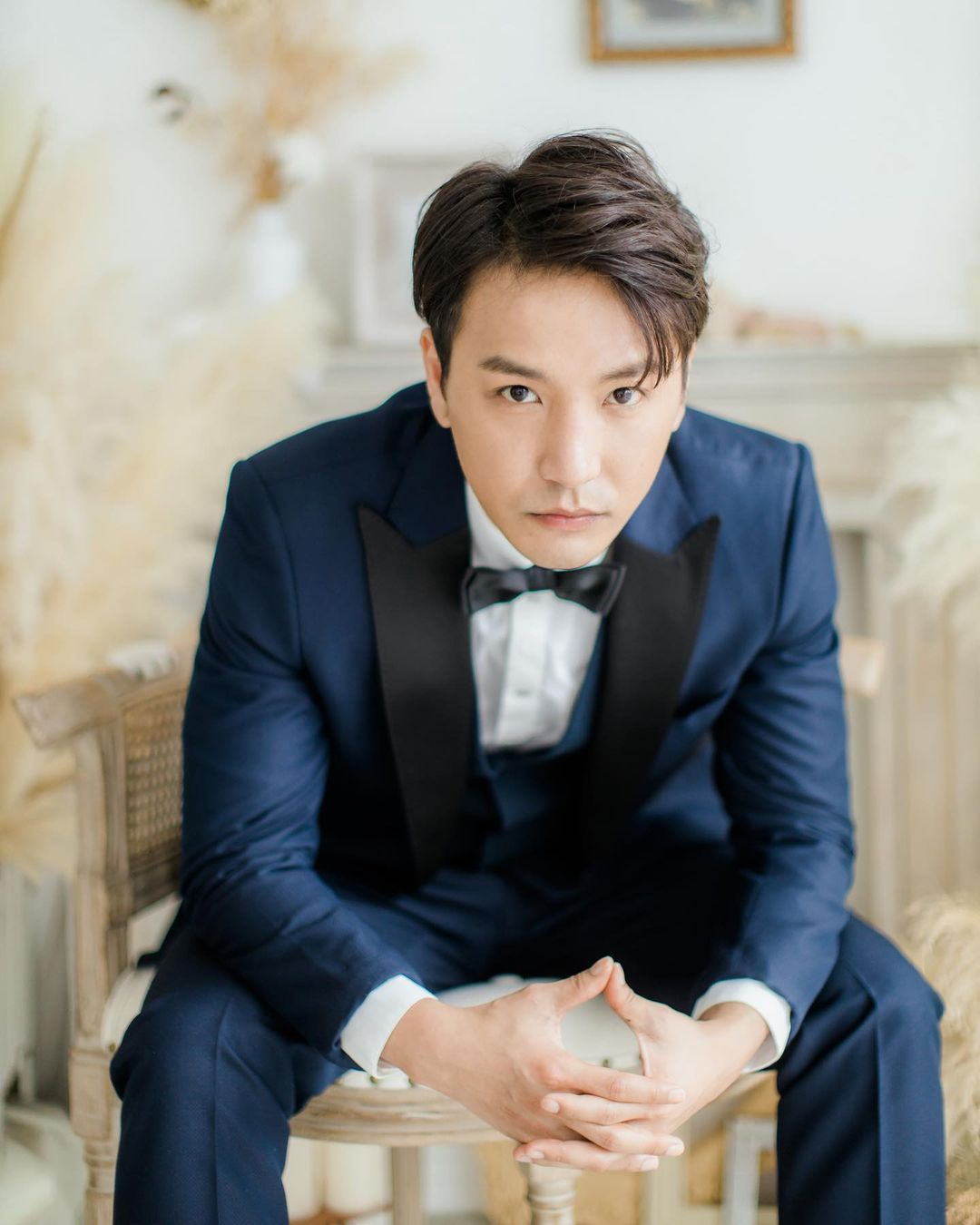
- Lam in April 2020
- Born: Lam Yiu-sing; 1988 or 1989 (age 36–37); Hong Kong
- Occupation: Actor
- Years active: 2008–present

Lam Yiu-sing (Chinese: 林耀聲; born 1988/1989) is a Hong Kong actor best known for his roles as Tse Chi-lung in the sports film Weeds on Fire (2016) and young David in the ViuTV romance series Margaret & David.

== Biography ==
Lam was born in 1988 or 1989. He has an elder brother and grew up in a public housing estate in Tuen Mun. He did not perform well academically and left school after finishing Form 5, beginning to work various jobs, including as a mall renovation worker. At the age of 17, Lam was discovered by director Heiward Mak on a sports field, and was cast in the lead role of her drama film High Noon. After this experience, he became interested in acting and began auditioning for roles, starring in student graduation projects and short films while continuing to work in labor jobs, such as an air conditioning maintenance apprentice. In 2014, Lam again collaborated with Heiward Mak, starring in her romance film Uncertain Relationship Society.

Lam's breakout role came in 2016, when he played Tse Chi-lung, a baseball player on a real-life Hong Kong team that won the first gold medal in baseball, in the sports drama film Weeds on Fire. That same year, he also shared a lead role with Bowie Lam as the younger version of the titular character David in the ViuTV romance series Margaret & David - Green Bean. Lam continued to land lead roles, starring in the HOY TV romance series 100 Days of Love II in 2017. In 2018, he portrayed musician Danny Yip in the biographical film House of The Rising Sons, and had a lead role in the comedy film Keyboard Warriors alongside Neo Yau. The following year, he co-starred as Bunny in the sports film We Are Legends, and appeared in the drama film Suk Suk. He also starred in Toy Stories, a segment of the 2020 anthology film Memories to Choke On, Drinks to Wash Them Down. In 2021, Lam portrayed the younger version of Patrick Tse in the black comedy film Time, for which they shared a win for the Best Movie Character of the Year in the Hong Kong Screenwriters' Guild Awards of that same year.

In 2022, Lam had a main role in the mystery thriller web series Chasing the Times, and appeared as the younger version of Tony Leung Chiu-wai in the crime thriller film Where the Wind Blows. In 2024, he landed a main role in the ViuTV legal drama Legal Affair, and starred in a lead role as the younger version of Sam Lee (played by Stephen Tung) in the action film Stuntman.

== Personal life ==
Lam began dating actress and model Charlotte Cheung in June 2016, and announced their break up in November 2019. In 2023, he opened an izakaya in Mong Kok with singer Yuri Chan.

== Filmography ==
=== Film ===
Year	Title	Role	Notes/Ref.
2008	High Noon	Nou Wing (怒榮)	
2010	Dream Home	Sheung's Brother	
2010	Love in a Puff	Hak Jai (黑仔)	
2014	Uncertain Relationship Society	Ho Yip (何葉)	
2016	Weeds on Fire	Tse Chi-lung (謝志龍)	
2018	House of The Rising Sons	Danny Yip	
2018	Keyboard Warriors	Kwan Ching-kit (關正傑)	
2018	Paws Man	Lau Nga-chuen (劉亞全)	
2019	We Are Legends	Bunny (電兔)	
2019	Suk Suk	Edmond	
2020	Memories to Choke On, Drinks to Wash Them Down	The Elder Brother	Segment: Toy Stories
2021	Time	Young Chau (田立秋)	
2022	Where the Wind Blows	Young Nam Kong (南江)	
2023	It Remains	Tang Mo (鄧武)	Special appearance
2023	The Goldfinger	Tse Kin-ming (謝建明)	
2024	Love Lies	Detective Wong (黃Sir)	
2024	Stuntman	Young Sam Lee (李森)	
2025	My Best Bet	Terry	

=== Television ===
Year	Title	Role	Notes/Ref.
2016	Margaret & David - Green Bean	Young David (大衛)	Main role
2017	100 Days of Love II	Cheung Ka-ching (張家正)	Main role
2018	VR Exorcist	Calvin	Cameo
2018	Guardian Angel	Nicky (力奇)	Recurring role
2018	If Love Was Not Timeless	Tang Chi-nam (鄧子嵐)	Main role
2019	Haters Gonna Stay	Himself	Cameo
2021	Ink at Tai Ping	Chow Yu-yan (周宇仁)	Special appearance
2022	Chasing the Times	Wallace Yip (葉港偉)	Main role
2023	Sparks	Lok (郭建樂)	Recurring role
2023	Business Proposal	Skewers stall owner	Cameo
2024	Legal Affair	Jonny	Main role

== Awards and nominations ==
Year	Award	Category	Work	Result	Ref.
2021	Hong Kong Screenwriters' Guild Awards 2021	Best Movie Character of the Year	Time	Won	
