= First Feature Film Initiative =

The First Feature Film Initiative (Chinese: 首部劇情電影計劃; FFFI) is a scheme of the Hong Kong government, organised by Create Hong Kong (CreateHK) of the Commerce and Economic Development Bureau and supported by the Film Development Council, to nurture talents for the film industry. It is a competition on screenplay and production proposals, and the winning teams receive funding from the Film Development Fund to make their first feature films.

The competition is divided into Higher Education Institutions Group (HEIG) and Professional Group (PG), the former recommended by higher education institutions or member institutions of the Vocational Training Council (Note: Each of the following institutions can recommend two teams: The Hong Kong Academy for Performing Arts, Hong Kong Baptist University, the Hong Kong Polytechnic University, the City University of Hong Kong, the Open University of Hong Kong, Hong Kong Institute of Vocational Education (Lee Wai Lee), Hong Kong Design Institute, the Chinese University of Hong Kong and the Chu Hai College of Higher Education. The Savannah College of Art and Design (Hong Kong) was eligible for recommending teams until the 6th award.) and the latter without quota. Each group awards up to three winners; prior to 2020, HEIG awarded up to two winners and PG at most one. For a team to be eligible, the directors must not have shot any commercial film with a running time of 80 minutes or longer as a director, co-director or executive director; the producers must have participated in the production of at least two films publicly exhibited in Hong Kong in the past 20 years in the capacity of a presenter or producer.

Inaugurated in 2013, the initiative has awarded 18 films as of 2020 and ten have been released publicly.

== Funding ==
The winning teams receive full funding from the Film Development Fund in the production of their films. The amounts of the funding are as follows:

Awards	HEIG	PG
1st (2013)	2 million	5 million
2nd - 5th (2016-2019)	3.25 million	5.5 million
6th (2020- )	5 million	8 million

== Winners ==
Awards	Group	English Title	Chinese Title	Director	Release Date	Box office (HK$)
1st (2013)	PG	Opus 1 (Note: Released as Somewhere Beyond the Mist)	藍天白雲	Cheung King-wai	18 January 2018	771,424
1st (2013)	HEIG	Mad World	一念無明	Wong Chun	30 March 2017	16,923,985
1st (2013)	HEIG	Weeds on Fire	點五步	Steve Chan Chi-fat	25 August 2016	4,678,142
2nd (2016)	PG	Love@The Square (Note: Released as Apart)	戀@廣埸 (Note: Released as 散後)	Chan Chit-man	11 January 2021 (Note: Hong Kong Independent Film Festival)	
2nd (2016)	HEIG	In Your Dream (Note: Released as In Your Dreams)	以青春的名義愛你 (Note: Released as 以青春的名義)	Tam Wai-ching	11 January 2018	475,274
3rd (2017)	PG	G Affairs	G殺	Lee Cheuk-pan	14 March 2019	
3rd (2017)	HEIG	Still Human	淪落人	Oliver Siu-kuen Chan	11 April 2019	19,811,169
4th (2018)	PG	Elisa's Day	滄海遺愛 (Note: Released as 遺愛)	Alan Fung	10 June 2021	
4th (2018)	HEIG	Hand-rolled Cigarette	手捲煙	Chan Kin-long	17 June 2021	
4th (2018)	HEIG	My Prince Edward	金都	Norris Wong	11 June 2020	
5th (2019)	PG	A Light Never Goes Out	燈火闌珊	Anastasia Tsang Hin-Ling	In production	
5th (2019)	HEIG	Time Still Turns the Pages	年少日記	Nick Cheuk	In production	
5th (2019)	HEIG	The Dinner	過時·過節 (Note: Released as 陽)	Eric Tsang Hing-wen	24 November 2022	
6th (2020)	PG	Love Lies	我談的那場戀愛	Ho Miu-kei		
6th (2020)	PG	Lost Love	流水落花	Ka Sing-fung	1 March 2023	
6th (2020)	HEIG	Fly Me to the Moon	但願人長久	Sasha Chuk		
6th (2020)	HEIG	Blossoms Under Somewhere	寄了一整個春天	Riley Yip		
6th (2020)	HEIG	Gamer Girls	電競女孩聯盟	Veronica Bassetto		
6th (2020)	HEIG	Gamer Girls	電競女孩聯盟	Sophie Yang		
