= List of Hong Kong films of 2023 =

This article lists feature-length Hong Kong films released in 2023.

== Box office ==
The highest-grossing Hong Kong films released in 2023, by domestic box office gross revenue, are as follows:

(List of 2023 box office number-one films in Hong Kong)

Highest-grossing films released in 2023
Rank	Title	Distributor	Domestic gross
1	A Guilty Conscience	Edko Films	HK$115,060,394
2	The Goldfinger	Emperor Cinema	HK$43,690,958
3	Time Still Turns the Pages	mm2 Entertainment	HK$26,973,965
4	Over My Dead Body	One Cool Film	HK$22,694,947
5	In Broad Daylight	One Cool Film	HK$21,865,934
6	Everything Under Control	Emperor Cinema	HK$16,152,635
7	The White Storm 3: Heaven or Hell	Universe Films Distribution	HK$14,029,537
8	One More Chance	A Really Happy Film	HK$13,016,296
9	Mad Fate	Golden Scene Company Limited	HK$11,703,729
10	Where the Wind Blows	Mei Ah Entertainment	HK$11,260,914

== Releases ==
Opening		Title	Director	Cast	Genre	Ref.
J A N	19	Sakra	Donnie Yen	Donnie Yen, Chen Yuqi, Cya Liu, Grace Wong	Martial arts, wuxia	
J A N	21	A Guilty Conscience	Jack Ng	Dayo Wong, Tse Kwan-ho, Louise Wong, Fish Liew, Dee Ho	Legal, comedy	
J A N	21	Everything Under Control	Ying Chi-wen	Hins Cheung, Ivana Wong, Jeffrey Ngai, Kaho Hung	Comedy, crime	
F E B	2	To My Nineteen Year Old Self	Mabel Cheung	—N/a	Documentary	
F E B	17	Where the Wind Blows	Philip Yung	Aaron Kwok, Tony Leung	Crime, thriller	
F E B	23	Shadows	Glenn Chan	Stephy Tang, Philip Keung, Tse Kwan-ho, Babyjohn Choi, Ling Man-lung, Jennifer Yu, Ben Yuen	Horror, thriller	
M A R	2	Lost Love	Ka Sing-fung	Sammi Cheng, Alan Luk, Hedwig Tam	Drama	
M A R	9	Cyber Heist	Danny Wong	Aaron Kwok, Gordon Lam, Simon Yam, Zeno Koo, Kenny Wong	Action, thriller	
M A R	30	The Sunny Side of the Street	Lau Kok-rui	Anthony Wong, Sahal Zaman, Endy Chow	Drama	
A P R	4	Over My Dead Body	Ho Cheuk-tin	Teresa Mo, Ronald Cheng, Wong You Nam, Jennifer Yu, Edan Lui, Jer Lau, Hanna Chan, Lau Kong	Comedy	
A P R	13	A Light Never Goes Out	Anastasia Tsang	Sylvia Chang, Simon Yam, Cecilia Choi, Henick Chou, Rachel Leung	Drama	
A P R	19	To Be Continued	Dora Choi, Haider Kikabhoy	—N/a	Documentary	
A P R	20	Mad Fate	Soi Cheang	Gordon Lam, Lokman Yeung, Berg Ng	Mystery, thriller	
A P R	27	Twelve Days	Aubrey Lam	Stephy Tang, Edward Ma	Romance	
M A Y	11	Social Distancing	Giltte Leung	Gladys Li, Angus Yeung, Jeana Ho, Zeno Koo, Mimi Kung, Kevin Chu	Fantasy, Horror	
M A Y	18	Fate	Gurt Wong	Liu Kai-chi, Chiu Sin-hang	Drama	
M A Y	25	Tales from the Occult: Body and Soul	Frank Hui, Daniel Chan, Doris Wong	1st segment: Michelle Wai, Wong You Nam; 2nd segment: Cecilia Choi, Kevin Chu, Tony Wu, Ansonbean; 3rd segment: Karena Lam, Terrance Lau, Chu Pak Hong	Horror	
J U N	29	One More Chance	Anthony Pun	Chow Yun-fat, Will Or, Anita Yuen	Drama	
J U L	27	The White Storm 3: Heaven or Hell	Herman Yau	Aaron Kwok, Louis Koo, Sean Lau	Action	
J U L	27	Tales from the Occult: Ultimate Malevolence	Lee Chi-ngai, Peter Lee, Pater Wong	1st segment: Angel Lam, Hunny Ho; 2nd segment: Philip Keung, Amy Lo; 3rd segment: Peter Chan, Will Or	Horror	
A U G	10	Yum Investigation	Dickson Leung	Dee Ho, Leung Yip, Denis Kwok, Poki Ng, Mandy Tam, Suey Kwok, Catherine Chau, Sammy Sum	Mystery	
A U G	18	Death Notice	Herman Yau	Louis Koo, Julian Cheung, Francis Ng	Action thriller	
A U G	24	It Remains	Kelvin Shum	Anson Lo, David Chiang, Summer Chan, Chu Pak Hong, Ng Siu-hin, Tree Kwok, Angela Yuen, Lam Yiu-sing	Fantasy, Thriller	
A U G	31	Onpaku	Shugo Fujii	Josie Ho	Horror	
A U G	31	Echoes Of The Thunder	Tony Tang	Louis Cheung, Bosco Wong, Carlos Chan, Kenny Wong, Niki Chow	Action	
S E P	14	Back Home	Nate Ki	Anson Kong, Bai Ling	Horror	
S E P	14	Stand Up Story	Au Cheuk-man	Ng Siu-hin, Ben Yuen	Drama, Comedy	
S E P	28	Lonely Eighteen	Tracy Hsu	Angel Lam, Renci Yeung, Irene Wan, Rachel Lee, Fish Liew, Stephanie Che	Drama	
O C T	19	Band Four	Lai Yan-chi	Kay Tse, Teddy Robin, Anna Hisbbur, Rondi Chan, Hanjin Tan, Manson Cheung	Drama, Music	
N O V	2	One Night at School	Sunny Lau	MC Cheung Tin-fu, Ling Man-lung, Eric Kot, Candy Wong, Heidi Lee, Ng Siu Hin	Comedy horror	
N O V	2	In Broad Daylight	Lawrence Kan	Jennifer Yu, Bowie Lam, David Chiang, Rachel Leung	Crime, Drama	
N O V	16	Time Still Turns the Pages	Nick Cheuk	Siuyea Lo, Ronald Cheng, Hanna Chan, Rosa Maria Velasco, Sean Wong, Nancy Kwai	Drama, Teen	
N O V	23	Elegies	Ann Hui	—N/a	Documentary	
D E C	8	Bursting Point	Dante Lam, Waihon Tong	Nick Cheung, William Chan, Isabella Leong, Natalie Hsu, Chrissie Chau	Action, crime	
D E C	30	The Goldfinger	Felix Chong	Tony Leung Chiu-wai, Andy Lau, Charlene Choi, Simon Yam	Drama, crime	

== See also ==
- 2023 in Hong Kong
- List of 2023 box office number-one films in Hong Kong
- List of Hong Kong films of 2022
- 41st Hong Kong Film Awards
