= Maurice Wong =

Wong Ping-kin Maurice Wong
- Born: 14 February 1928; Singapore, Straits Settlements
- Died: 23 April 2007 (aged 79); San Francisco, California, United States
- Occupation: Solicitor
- Spouse(s): Choy Chi Wai, Shirley

Maurice Wong, MBE, JP^{[?]} (14 February 1928 – 23 April 2007), also rendered as Wong Peng-kuen, was a Hong Kong solicitor. He was a partner of Deacons from 1964 to 1984. In 1984, after becoming involved in the Carrian case, he resigned and left Hong Kong, living thereafter in the United States. Wong graduated from Trinity Hall, Cambridge, University of Cambridge. He was admitted as a practising solicitor in Hong Kong in 1959 and was employed by Deacons. As one of the few Chinese solicitors in Hong Kong at the time, Wong held numerous public offices in the 1960s and 1970s. These included serving as a director of Po Leung Kuk for the gengzi year from 1960 to 1961, and as first director of Po Leung Kuk and director of Pok Oi Hospital for the xinchou year from 1961 to 1962. In 1966, he was appointed by the Government of Hong Kong as a member of the Commission of Inquiry into the Kowloon Disturbances, which issued its report in December of that year. He was appointed MBE in 1967 and became an unofficial Justice of the Peace in 1970. In 1980, Wong, together with Deacons senior partner John Wimbush and partner Poon Siu-chung, assisted the Carrian Group in the high-priced sale of the entire Gammon House. It was later revealed that Carrian had never completed the transaction, but had nevertheless included the profit from the transaction in its corporate results, allegedly conspiring to defraud Carrian's shareholders and creditors. In May 1984, the Hong Kong police formally issued a warrant for Wong's arrest, although he was reportedly already in the United States at the time. After years of legal proceedings, the charges against Wong in connection with the Carrian case were eventually withdrawn by the authorities in 1988.

== Life ==
=== Early life ===
Wong's ancestral home was Taishan, Guangdong. He was born on 14 February 1928 in Singapore, then part of the Straits Settlements. His father Wong Siu-kwan was a son of the local entrepreneur Wong Ah Fook. As a child, Wong was sent to St. Stephen's College in Stanley, Hong Kong, where he lived as a boarder and experienced the Second World War. After graduation, he went to the United Kingdom and entered Trinity Hall, Cambridge, University of Cambridge. He received a Bachelor of Arts degree in 1954 and was conferred the title of Master of Arts in 1959. After returning to Hong Kong, Wong served as a member of the council of St. Stephen's College and was elected president of the St. Stephen's College Old Boys' Association from 1960 to 1961.

=== Public service ===
In 1959, Wong was admitted as a practising solicitor in Hong Kong and was employed by Deacons. In June 1964, he was invited to become a partner of the firm. He worked at Deacons for many years, and by the time he resigned in May 1984, he ranked third among the firm's partners. Wong also held business positions, including director of Siu Kwan Properties Trust Limited and director of Kee Cheong Life and Fire Insurance Company Limited under the Carrian Group. Deacons was one of Hong Kong's oldest law firms at the time. After joining Deacons as one of its few Chinese solicitors, Wong held many public offices in the 1960s and 1970s. These included serving as a director of Po Leung Kuk from 1960 to 1961, and as first director of Po Leung Kuk and director of Pok Oi Hospital from 1961 to 1962. Apart from Po Leung Kuk, Wong, who was particularly concerned with child welfare in Hong Kong, long participated in the work of the Children's Home under the Hong Kong Sheng Kung Hui—the predecessor of the Hong Kong Children and Youth Services—and the Children's Meals Society. He served on the committees of both organizations and was elected chairman of the Children's Home twice, from 1965 to 1966 and from 1971 to 1972. Closely associated with the South China Athletic Association, he was also its permanent director and legal adviser. Through his work with charitable organizations, Wong gradually came to the attention of the Government of Hong Kong. From 1962 to 1971 he was appointed a member of the Social Welfare Advisory Committee; from 1964 to 1973 he served on the Board of Management of the Chinese Permanent Cemeteries; in 1965 he was appointed a member of the committee reviewing the law and practice of corporal punishment in Hong Kong; and he also served on the Advisory Committee on the Lease of Private Recreational Land. In April 1966, the Star Ferry fare increase riots broke out in Hong Kong. A series of demonstrations developed into disturbances, and the government deployed military and police forces to maintain order. Afterwards, then Governor of Hong Kong Sir David Trench, acting with the Executive Council, decided to establish the Commission of Inquiry into the Kowloon Disturbances. The commission was chaired by Chief Justice Sir Michael Hogan, with Wong, Hong Kong Scout Association commissioner Lo Tsang-kan, and former University of Hong Kong vice-chancellor Sir Lindsay Ride as members. The commission later issued the Report of the Commission of Inquiry into the Kowloon Disturbances in December 1966, reviewing the incident and making recommendations. Wong's long participation in social affairs earned him an MBE in 1967. On 11 March 1970, he became an unofficial Justice of the Peace.

=== Carrian case ===
In January 1980, the Carrian Group of businessman George Tan and the Eda Group headed by Chung Ching-man jointly purchased the entire Gammon House in Central from Hongkong Land for HK$998 million. In August of the same year, Carrian announced that it planned to resell the building to the brothers Lam Sau-fung and Lam Sau-wing of the BoNing Shun Group for HK$1.68 billion, making a paper profit of more than HK$600 million in just over half a year and causing a public sensation. Completed in 1975, Gammon House was a 37-storey Grade A commercial building. It was originally owned by Jardine Matheson; Hongkong Land bought it from Jardine in December 1978 for HK$715 million before selling it to Carrian. Carrian's purchase and resale of Gammon House was assisted by Deacons senior partner John Wimbush and partners Wong Ping-kin and Poon Siu-chung.

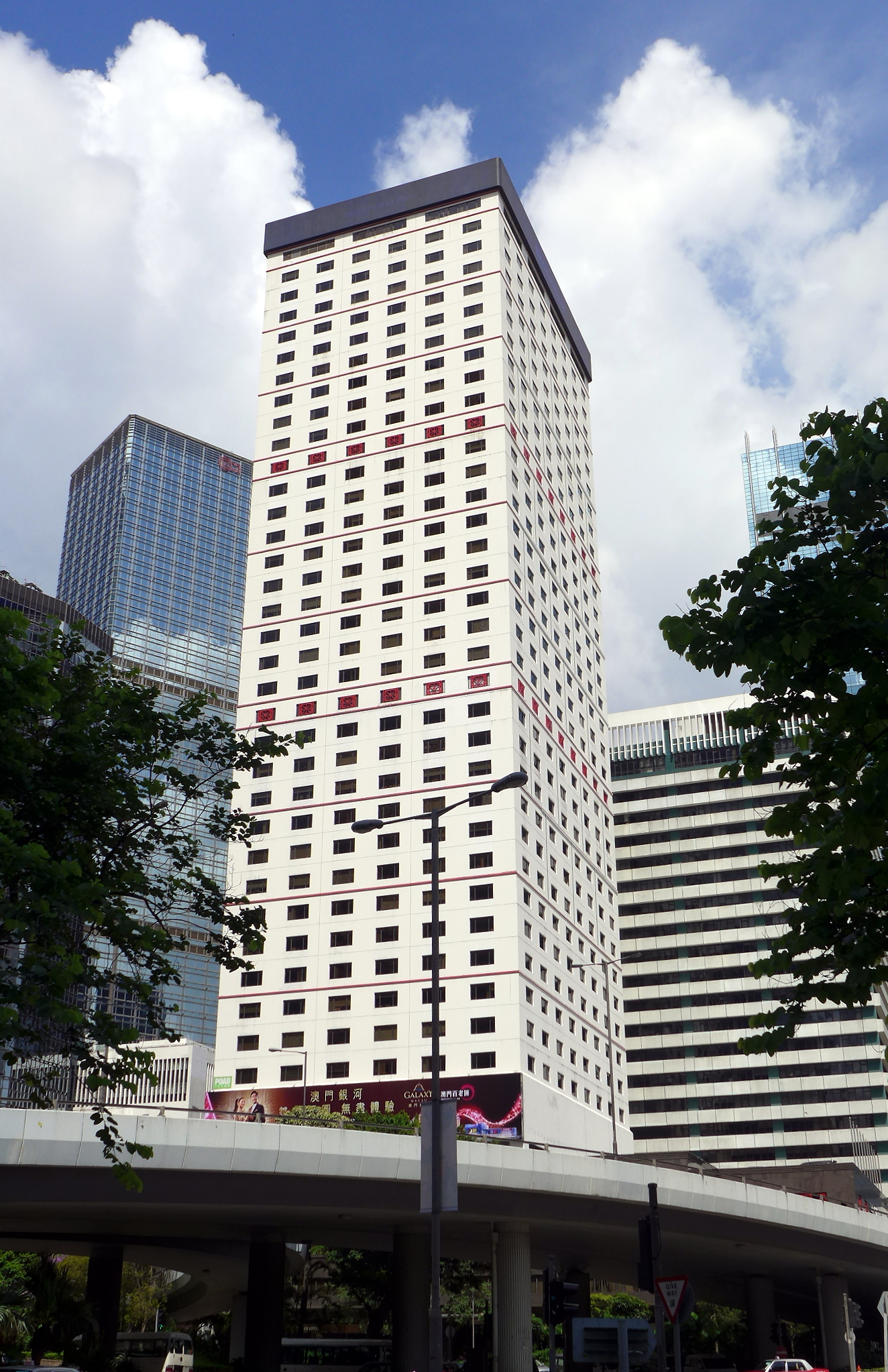
Gammon House was later renamed Carrian Centre and then Bank of America Tower.

After the Carrian bubble burst in 1982, a number of suspected fraudulent acts involving George Tan and other figures in the Carrian Group gradually came to light and were investigated by the authorities. In October 1983, the police formally charged Carrian Group chairman George Tan and executive director Ho Kwai-chuen, whose company was facing liquidation, with allegedly falsifying business reports. More people were later charged. As Deacons had served as Carrian's legal adviser, the police also attempted to enter the firm with a search warrant to collect evidence, but the firm applied to the court to object. On 13 April 1984, John Wimbush, who had been invited by the police for questioning, was found mysteriously drowned in the swimming pool of his residence. A nylon rope was tied around his neck and attached to a concrete drain cover. The Coroner's Court later ruled that Wimbush died by suicide. Meanwhile, the police wanted to invite Wong and Poon for questioning, but the two were reportedly already in the United States and Australia, respectively. In early May 1984, reports emerged that the police were preparing to prosecute Wong and Poon. A police spokesman initially refused to comment, citing operational confidentiality. On 22 May, during a court appearance by George Tan and other defendants, the prosecution read out the charges and named Wimbush, Wong and Poon in one charge, alleging that they had joined with George Tan and others to conceal the fact that Carrian had never truly resold Gammon House to BoNing Shun, while including the profit from the transaction in the company's results announced in September 1980. They were suspected of conspiring to defraud Carrian's shareholders and creditors. Soon afterwards, on 28 May, the police formally issued arrest warrants for Wong and Poon. Deacons issued a statement that evening saying that the two had resigned as partners on the same day. Since both men were outside Hong Kong, the police could only seek the attention of Interpol. Because the Carrian case was complex, different charges in the case had to be tried separately. The “Gammon House case” was one part of the broader Carrian case. In September 1987, the High Court concluded another conspiracy-to-defraud case related to Carrian. The trial judge dramatically dismissed the charges, citing reasons including duplicative charges by the prosecution, and six defendants, including George Tan, were released in court, provoking public controversy. In May 1988, the Gammon House case opened in the High Court. The prosecution then stated that the first defendant, George Tan, and the second defendant, Ho Kwai-chuen, were also involved in a third conspiracy-to-defraud case. Considering that the third case was more serious and that simultaneous trials might cause confusion, the prosecution decided to offer no evidence against the defendants in the Gammon House case. The judge accepted the decision, and all five defendants were acquitted and released. Wong and Poon had in fact remained overseas and were therefore not listed as defendants in the Gammon House case. After the five defendants in that case were acquitted, the charges involving Wong and Poon were also withdrawn by the prosecution. However, George Tan still faced other charges related to the Carrian case. After years of legal proceedings, the High Court finally convicted him in 1996 on two counts of conspiracy to defraud and sentenced him to three years' imprisonment.

=== Later life ===
Before leaving Deacons, Wong sold a 0.37% partnership share in Deacons and a corresponding share placed in Standard Chartered Hong Kong Trust to another Deacons partner, Alan Wells, in July 1983 for HK$274,000. In January 1984, Wong sold Wells a further 0.26% partnership share in Deacons and Standard Chartered Trust for HK$187,000. Both transactions were agreed to be repaid by monthly instalments. However, from September 1984 Wells stopped making monthly payments and gave notice to Wong that he would cease repayment and accept personal legal liability, involving HK$315,000. After the charges against Wong in connection with the Carrian case were withdrawn, he filed a claim in the Supreme Court of Hong Kong in October 1990 to recover the debt from Wells. At the time, he reported that he was residing in San Francisco, California, United States. Wong died in San Francisco on 23 April 2007 at the age of 79. However, in the 2017 list of unofficial Justices of the Peace published by the Government of Hong Kong Special Administrative Region in the Hong Kong Government Gazette, Wong still appeared on the list, an unusual case of a Justice of the Peace who had died many years earlier but had not yet been removed from the list.

== Personal life ==
Wong was married. During his life in Hong Kong, he was active in the Rotary Club of Kowloon West. He served as secretary in 1963, was elected vice-president in 1965, and served as president from 1966 to 1967.

== Honours ==
- The following lists the full titles and abbreviations of honours:
  - Member of the Order of the British Empire (M.B.E.), 1967 Birthday Honours
  - Unofficial Justice of the Peace (J.P.), 11 March 1970

== See also ==
- Wong Ah Fook
- Deacons (law firm)
- Star Ferry fare increase riots
- Carrian case
- Bank of America Tower (Hong Kong)

== Footnotes ==
Appendix: major experience
- Admitted as a practising solicitor in Hong Kong and joined Deacons (1959); Director of Po Leung Kuk for the gengzi year (1960–1961); President of the St. Stephen's College Old Boys' Association (1960–1961); First director of Po Leung Kuk for the xinchou year (1961–1962); Director of Pok Oi Hospital for the xinchou year (1961–1962); Member of the Social Welfare Advisory Committee (1962–1971); Secretary of the Rotary Club of Kowloon West (1963–1965); Partner of Deacons (June 1964 – May 1984); Member of the Board of Management of the Chinese Permanent Cemeteries (1964–1973); Chairman of the Children's Home (1965–1966, 1971–1972); Vice-president of the Rotary Club of Kowloon West (1965–1966); Member of the Hong Kong Committee Reviewing the Law and Practice of Corporal Punishment (1965); President of the Rotary Club of Kowloon West (1966–1967); Member of the Commission of Inquiry into the Kowloon Disturbances (1966)

Other offices
Preceded by Wong Chak-sum	President of the St. Stephen's College Old Boys' Association; 1960–1961	Succeeded by Wu Bingjian
Preceded by Cheung Tsz-suen	President of the Rotary Club of Kowloon West; 1966–1967	Succeeded by Cheung Kwai-hang
