= Hong Kong Film Directors' Guild Awards =

Hong Kong annual film awards

The Hong Kong Film Directors' Guild Awards (Chinese: 香港電影導演會年度大獎) is an annual Hong Kong film awards ceremony organized by the Hong Kong Film Directors' Guild. It was established in 2006. The awards are presented at the Guild’s annual spring banquet, with winners selected through a one-person-one-vote system among all members. The Honorary Award, however, is only presented if it is endorsed by more than three-quarters of the members.

The list of award winners is typically announced in early March each year. Initially, the awards included only a few categories such as “Recommended Film of the Year,” “Outstanding Director of the Year,” and “New Performer of the Year.” Starting in 2013, the Guild shifted from its original focus on recommendation and encouragement to a more competitive model, introducing categories for Best Film, Best Director, Best Actor, Best Actress, Best New Performer, and Best New Director. Beginning in 2024, new categories for Best Supporting Actor and Best Supporting Actress were added.

Because the Guild’s membership closely overlaps with the voting body of the Hong Kong Film Awards, the awards are often seen as a bellwether to the annual Hong Kong Film Awards.

== Past recipients ==
=== Before 2013 ===
Year	Date of Ceremony	Recommended Film of the Year	Outstanding Director of the Year	New Performer of the Year	New Director of the Year	Life Time Award
2005	11 March 2006	Election, Initial D, Perhaps Love	Johnnie To (Election), Peter Chan (Perhaps Love), Tsui Hark (Seven Swords)	—N/a	—N/a	—N/a
2006	16 March 2007	Exiled, Fearless, A Battle of Wits, After This Our Exile	Johnnie To (Exiled), Patrick Tam (After This Our Exile), Andrew Lau & Alan Mak (Confession of Pain)	Gold: Ian Gouw (After This Our Exile); Silver: Huo Siyan (My Name Is Fame); Bronze: Sun Li (Fearless)	—N/a	—N/a
2007	7 March 2008	The Warlords, Protégé, The Postmodern Life of My Aunt	Ann Hui (The Postmodern Life of My Aunt), Peter Chan (The Warlords), Derek Yee (Protégé)	Gold: Kate Tsui (Eye in the Sky); Silver: Linda Chung (Love Is Not All Around), Wen Junhui (The Pye Dog)	—N/a	—N/a
2008	20 February 2009	The Way We Are, Ip Man, Red Cliff	Ann Hui (The Way We Are), Wilson Yip (Ip Man), John Woo (Red Cliff)	Gold: Xu Jiao (CJ7); Silver: Juno Leung (The Way We Are); Bronze: Zhang Yuqi (All About Women)	Derek Kwok (The Moss)	—N/a
2009	18 March 2010	Echoes of the Rainbow, Overheard, Bodyguards and Assassins	Alan Mak & Felix Chong (Overheard), Alex Law (Echoes of the Rainbow), Teddy Chen (Bodyguards and Assassins)	Gold: Li Yuchun (Bodyguards and Assassins); Silver: Aarif Lee (Echoes of the Rainbow); Bronze: Océane Zhu (Prince of Tears)	King Cheung (KJ: Music and Life)	Sammo Hung
2010	3 March 2011	The Stool Pigeon, Gallants, Love in a Puff, Detective Dee and the Mystery of the Phantom Flame	Dante Lam (The Stool Pigeon), Tsui Hark (Detective Dee and the Mystery of the Phantom Flame), Pang Ho-cheung (Love in a Puff)	Gold: Dennis To (The Legend Is Born: Ip Man); Silver: Jennifer Tse (Bruce Lee, My Brother); Bronze: Hanjin Tan (Bruce Lee, My Brother)	Felix Chong (Once a Gangster)	—N/a
2011	29 February 2012	A Simple Life, Overheard 2, Let the Bullets Fly	Jiang Wen (Let the Bullets Fly), Ann Hui (A Simple Life), Tsui Hark (Flying Swords of Dragon Gate)	Gold: Zheng Shuang (Mural); Silver: Sheng Chien (Flying Swords of Dragon Gate); Bronze: Shiga Lin (Lan Kwai Fong), Jam Hsiao (The Killer Who Never Kills)	Jessey Tsang (Big Blue Lake)	Ann Hui
2012	4 March 2013	Love in the Buff, Motorway, Cold War	Pang Ho-cheung (Love in the Buff), Soi Cheang (Motorway), Sunny Luk & Longman Leung (Cold War)	Cherry Ngan (Nightfall)	Roy Chow (Nightfall)	Joe Cheung

=== From 2013 to 2023 ===
Year	Date of Ceremony	Best Film	Best Director	Best Actor	Best Actress	Best New Performer	Best New Director	Jury's Special Award	Honorary Award
2013	5 March 2014	The Grandmaster	Wong Kar-wai (The Grandmaster)	Tony Leung Chiu-wai (The Grandmaster)	Zhang Ziyi (The Grandmaster)	Babyjohn Choi (The Way We Dance)	Wong Sau Ping (The Way We Dance)	Derek Kwok (As the Light Goes Out)	—N/a
2014	18 March 2015	The Golden Era	Ann Hui (The Golden Era)	Sean Lau (Overheard 3)	Tang Wei (The Golden Era)	Ivana Wong (Golden Chicken 3)	Ruby Yang (My Voice, My Life)	Chan Kwok-Hung	—N/a
2015	9 March 2016	The Taking of Tiger Mountain	Tsui Hark (The Taking of Tiger Mountain)	Aaron Kwok (Port of Call)	Jessie Li (Port of Call)	Michael Ning (Port of Call)	Raman Hui (Monster Hunt)	Ten Years	Allen Fong
2016	2 March 2017	Trivisa	Stephen Chow (The Mermaid), Derek Tsang (Soul Mate)	Gordon Lam (Trivisa)	Kara Wai (Happiness)	Tony Wu (Weeds on Fire)	Wong Chun (Mad World)	—N/a	Michael Hui
2017	18 March 2018	Our Time Will Come	Sylvia Chang (Love Education)	Louis Koo (Paradox)	Teresa Mo (Tomorrow Is Another Day); Stephy Tang (The Empty Hands)	Rachel Leung (Somewhere Beyond the Mist)	Kearen Pang (29+1)	—N/a	Yuen Woo-ping, Kinson Tsang
2018	10 March 2019	Project Gutenberg	Felix Chong (Project Gutenberg)	Anthony Wong (Still Human)	Chloe Maayan (Three Husbands)	Crisel Consunji (Still Human)	Oliver Chan (Still Human)	Angie Chen (I've Got the Blues)	Ringo Lam
2019	21 March 2020 (online announcement)	Better Days	Derek Tsang (Better Days)	Cheung Ga-Nin (Suk Suk)	Zhou Dongyu (Better Days)	Terrance Lau (Beyond the Dream)	Norris Wong (My Prince Edward)	Cheuk Cheung (Bamboo Theatre)	—N/a
2020	19 July 2021 (online announcement)	Leap	Peter Chan (Leap)	Endy Chow (One Second Champion)	Gong Li (Leap)	Lydia Bai (Leap)	Man Lim Chung (Keep Rolling)	—N/a	Benny Chan
2021	12 April 2022 (online announcement)	Raging Fire	Benny Chan (Raging Fire)	Patrick Tse (Time)	Cya Liu (Limbo)	Louise Wong (Anita)	Chan Kin-long (Hand Rolled Cigarette)	Jun Li (Drifting)	Johnnie To
2022	16 March 2023	To My Nineteen Year Old Self	Wai Ka-fai (Detective vs Sleuths)	Sean Lau (Detective vs Sleuths)	Sammi Cheng (Lost Love)	Sahal Zaman (The Sunny Side of the Street)	Ho Cheuk-Tin (The Sparring Partner)	—N/a	Joe Cheung
2023	15 March 2024	A Guilty Conscience	Soi Cheang (Mad Fate)	Tony Leung Chiu-wai (The Goldfinger)	Jennifer Yu (In Broad Daylight)	Yoyo Tse (Fly Me to the Moon)	Nick Cheuk (Time Still Turns the Pages)	Jonathan Li (Dust to Dust)	Alex Law

=== Since 2024 ===
Year	Date of Ceremony	Best Film	Best Director	Best Actor	Best Actress	Best Supporting Actor	Best Supporting Actress	Best New Performer	Best New Director	Jury's Special Award	Honorary Award
2024	10 March 2025	Twilight of the Warriors: Walled In	Soi Cheang (Twilight of the Warriors: Walled In)	Michael Hui (The Last Dance)	Michelle Wai (The Last Dance)	Chu Pak Hong (The Last Dance)	Jo Kuk (Papa)	Dylan So (Papa)	Jill Leung (Last Song for You)	Robin Lee (Four Trails)	Wong Kar-wai
2025	22 March 2026	Ciao UFO	Patrick Leung (Ciao UFO)	Tony Leung Ka-fai (The Shadow's Edge)	Fish Liew (Someone Like Me)	Alex To (Sons of the Neon Night)	Michelle Wai (Ciao UFO)	Elizabeth Tang (Girlfriends)	Shu Qi (Girl)	Another World	Stanley Kwan
