= List of 2023 box office number-one films in Hong Kong =

This is a list of films which placed number-one at the Weekly box office in Hong Kong during 2023.

== Number-one films ==
†	This implies the highest-grossing movie of the year.

#	Date	Film	Weekend gross HK$	Total gross HK$	Ref.
1	5 January 2023	Avatar: The Way of Water	$16,100,857	$121,613,240	
2	12 January 2023	The First Slam Dunk	$12,236,358	$14,285,236	
3	19 January 2023	A Guilty Conscience †	$11,898,864	$12,148,852	
4	26 January 2023	A Guilty Conscience †	$43,994,466	$56,361,845	
5	2 February 2023	A Guilty Conscience †	$23,334,270	$80,132,162	
6	9 February 2023	A Guilty Conscience †	$14,057,128	$89,934,204	
7	16 February 2023	Ant-Man and the Wasp: Quantumania	$15,707,215	$15,707,215	
8	23 February 2023	Ant-Man and the Wasp: Quantumania	$6,883,678	$22,591,003	
9	2 March 2023	Suzume			
10	9 March 2023	Suzume			
11	16 March 2023	Suzume			
12	23 March 2023	John Wick: Chapter 4			
13	30 March 2023	John Wick: Chapter 4			
14	6 April 2023	The Super Mario Bros. Movie			
15	13 April 2023	The Super Mario Bros. Movie			
16	20 April 2023	The Super Mario Bros. Movie			
17	27 April 2023	The Super Mario Bros. Movie			
18	4 May 2023	Guardians of the Galaxy Vol. 3			
19	11 May 2023	Guardians of the Galaxy Vol. 3			
20	18 May 2023	Fast X			
21	25 May 2023	Fast X			
22	1 June 2023	Spider-Man: Across the Spider-Verse			
23	8 June 2023	Transformers: Rise of the Beasts			
24	15 June 2023	The Flash			
25	22 June 2023	The Flash			
26	29 June 2023	Indiana Jones and the Dial of Destiny			
27	6 July 2023	Elemental			
28	13 July 2023	Mission: Impossible - Dead Reckoning Part One			
29	20 July 2023	Oppenheimer			
30	27 July 2023	Oppenheimer			
31	3 August 2023	Oppenheimer			
32	10 August 2023	Oppenheimer			
33	17 August 2023	Oppenheimer			
34	24 August 2023	Oppenheimer			
35	31 August 2023	The Equalizer 3			
36	7 September 2023	The Nun II			
37	14 September 2023	A Haunting in Venice			
38	21 September 2023	A Haunting in Venice			
39	28 September 2023	The Creator			
40	5 October 2023	The Creator			
41	12 October 2023	My Heavenly City			
42	19 October 2023	Killers of the Flower Moon			
43	26 October 2023	Killers of the Flower Moon			
44	2 November 2023	In Broad Daylight			
45	9 November 2023	The Marvels			
46	16 November 2023	In Broad Daylight			
47	23 November 2023	Time Still Turns the Pages			
48	30 November 2023	Time Still Turns the Pages			
49	7 December 2023	Wonka			
50	14 December 2023	Trolls Band Together			
51	21 December 2023	Wish			
52	28 December 2023	The Goldfinger			

== Highest-grossing films ==
International film

Hong Kong film

Highest-grossing films of 2023
Rank	Title	Distributor	Domestic gross
1	A Guilty Conscience	Edko Films	HK$114.54 million (US$14.74 million)
2	Oppenheimer	Universal Pictures	HK$71.84 million (US$9.25 million)
3	Mission: Impossible – Dead Reckoning Part One	Paramount Pictures	HK$56.42 million (US$7.26 million)
4	The Super Mario Bros. Movie	Universal Pictures	HK$51.87 million (US$6.68 million)
5	Guardians of the Galaxy Vol. 3	Walt Disney Pictures	HK$43.72 million (US$5.63 million)
6	The Goldfinger	Emperor Cinema	HK$43.5 million (US$5.6 million)
7	Barbie	Warner Bros.	HK$40.37 million (US$5.2 million)
8	The First Slam Dunk	Medialink	HK$37.44 million (US$4.82 million)
9	John Wick: Chapter 4	Intercontinental Film	HK$34.58 million (US$4.45 million)
10	Fast X	Universal Pictures	HK$29.14 million (US$3.75 million)

== See also ==
- 2023 in Hong Kong
- List of Hong Kong films of 2023
- List of 2022 box office number-one films in Hong Kong

Preceded by 2022 Box office number-one films	Box office number-one films 2023	Succeeded by 2024 Box office number-one films
