= Cyber Heist =

2023 Hong Kong film by Danny Wong

- Film poster
- Traditional Chinese: 斷網
- Simplified Chinese: 断网
- Hanyu Pinyin: Duàn Wǎng
- Jyutping: Tyun5 Mong2
- Directed by: Danny Wong
- Written by: Philip Lui; Howard Yip; Shum Kwan-sin
- Produced by: Cheang Pou-soi
- Starring: Aaron Kwok; Gordon Lam; Simon Yam; Megan Lai
- Cinematography: Cheng Siu-Keung
- Edited by: Tsang Yu-kin
- Music by: Josh Cruddas
- Production companies: Sil-Metropole Organisation; Sublime Media; Entertaining Power; Media Asia Films; Lian Ray Pictures
- Distributed by: Edko Films
- Release date: 9 March 2023
- Running time: 111 minutes
- Country: Hong Kong
- Language: Cantonese
- Box office: US$10.2 million (Note: See Box office)

Cyber Heist, previously known as Disconnected, is a 2023 Hong Kong action thriller film directed by Danny Wong and starring Aaron Kwok as a cyber security engineer who develops an AI programme application which can potentially disable all of Hong Kong's networks. The film co-stars Gordon Lam, Simon Yam and Megan Lai.

Production for Cyber Heist took place from 12 June to 14 October 2020 and was released on 9 March 2023.

== Plot ==
Behind the computer screens lies a mysterious web jungle displaying full of fiber optics and data, which is a fantastical space carrying useful technology and malicious viruses at the same time.

Hackers release a virus to the web, unleashing a large scale cyber attack. Fortunately, cyber security engineer and IT whiz, Kelvin Cheuk (Aaron Kwok) uses a firewall he developed called Firewall X to resolve the crisis. Unbeknownst to Kelvin, the mastermind behind this virus spread is his superior, Kenneth Chan (Gordon Lam) and Kelvin also is framed into a money laundering conspiracy as a result.

To prove his innocence, Kelvin engages in a fierce battle with Kenneth. Kelvin secretly develops an AI programme application super virus and sets foot into dangerous grounds to ambush and attack the hackers and swears to find evidence of Kenneth's crimes. At the same time, Kenneth also commands the hackers to steal Kelvin's password-cracking software setting off a network technology crisis potentially and kidnap Kelvin's daughter, Bowie, while also threatening his wife, Sandy (Megan Lai). Kelvin is pressured as the lives of his family are being threatened. Making matters worse, his AI super virus loses control and swiftly finds its way entering every computer in Hong Kong, leading to a public panic, and Kelvin faces the challenge of reviving the city's network and rescuing his family from danger between life and death.

== Cast ==
- Aaron Kwok as Kelvin Cheuk Ka-chun (卓家俊), cyber security engineer of Sky Magic Pro and an IT whiz. When he is framed by Kenneth as the fall guy for the latter's money laundering scheme, he offers to assist the police in finding evidence of Kenneth's crimes to prove his own innocence.
- Gordon Lam as Kenneth Chan Ming-chi (陳明志), Kelvin's superior and CEO of cyber security company Sky Magic Pro who takes advantage of cyber security shortcomings to hack bank accounts for money laundering. Lam states his character will "viciously take on Kwok's character."
- Simon Yam as Ben Suen Ban (孫斌), Inspector of the Cyber Security and Technology Crime Bureau (CSTCB).
- Megan Lai as Sandy To Wing-shan (杜詠珊), Kelvin's wife.
- Kenny Wong as Frankie Fan Tak-fu (范德富), information security director of Sky Magic Pro who carries out the hacking process for Kenneth's money laundering scheme.
- Tony Wu as Tom, a computer hacker who works for Kenneth.
- Zeno Koo as Chan Ming-wai (陳明威), Kenneth's younger brother.
- Wiyona Yeung as Wong Lam (王琳), a henchwoman working for Mr. Pong.
- Julius Brian Siswojo as Mike, a hacker living in the United States and Kelvin's old friend who assists him in finding evidence of Kenneth's crimes.

=== Guest appearance ===
- Patrick Tam as Jason Chow Sai-ho (周世豪), Kelvin's colleague and friend who is also involved in the money laundering scheme. Tam describes his a character as one who is "difficult to tell whether a friend or foe to Kwok's character."

=== Special appearance ===
- Andy Kwong as Mr. Pong (龐老大), the mastermind behind the money laundering scheme.
- Bonnie Wong as Ching (清姐), Frankie's secretary.
- Kathy Yuen as May Fung Mei-lei (馮美莉), Frankie's wife.
- Terry Zou as Damon, a henchman working for Mr. Pong.

== Production ==
Principal photography for Cyber Heist began on 12 June 2020 in Ho Man Tin. In July 2020, production was temporarily halted due to the third wave outbreak of the COVID-19 pandemic in Hong Kong before resuming in August. Due to the pandemic affecting Hong Kong's film market, Aaron Kwok reportedly commanded only 70% of his normal salary to support the industry. A high tech office set for the film costed HK$2 million to build. Production for Cyber Heist officially wrapped up on 14 October 2020 after filming its final scene in a forest in Nam Sang Wai.

== Release ==
Cyber Heist was theatrically released on 9 March 2023 in Hong Kong. Edko Films has picked up the worldwide distribution rights for the film. On 5 May 2022, the film released its first teaser trailer displaying a slated release date for 2022. The film later released new character posters on 19 January 2023, displaying a slated release year of 2023.

== Reception ==
=== Box office ===
Cyber Heist has grossed a total of US$10.2 million worldwide combining its box office totals from Hong Kong ($632,939), Australia (US$16,653), New Zealand, (U$4,029), United Kingdom (US$2,872) and China (US$9.58 million).

=== Critical response ===
Edmund Lee of the South China Morning Post gave the film of 2/5 stars and calls it "a fairly watchable, action-driven crime thriller" and "is badly let down by its antiquated depiction of how the internet functions." CJ Sheu of The News Lens criticizes the film's shortcomings in plot, characters and CGI effects. Gabriel Chong of MovieXclusive gave the film a score of 3.5/5 and praises the film's visual representation of the internet while noting its far-fetched story and underwritten characters.

== See also ==
- Aaron Kwok filmography
