= George Tan =

Hong Kong businessman (1933–c.2021)

- 陳松青
- Born: 10 November 1933
- Died: c. 2021 (aged 87–88)
- Occupation: Businessman
- Conviction: Two counts of conspiracy to defraud (1996)
- Penalty: 3 years of imprisonment

Chinese name
- Traditional Chinese: 陳松青
- Simplified Chinese: 陈松青
Transcriptions
Standard Mandarin
- Hanyu Pinyin: Chén Sōngqīng
Yue: Cantonese
- Jyutping: can4 cung4 cing1
Southern Min
- Hokkien POJ: Tân Sông-chheng

George Tan Soon-gin was a Hong Kong financial criminal and businessman and who was known for his role and involvement in the Carrian Group and the scandal that led to its collapse.

== Early life and education ==
Tan was a descendant of Hokkien people.

There is conflicting information on Tan's year and place of birth. A report by Wall Street Journal claims Tan was born in Malaysia, and Tan himself claimed he was born in Sarawak in 1938. Meanwhile, Tan's Singapore passport, which was revoked by the Singaporean government, claims he was born in Fujian on 10 December 1933.

Tan trained in the United Kingdom as an engineer, obtaining a civil engineering degree at University of London.

== Career ==
Tan worked in Singapore and Malaysia during the 1960s, and had small civil engineering businesses in Singapore prior to him being declared bankrupt there.

Tan moved to Hong Kong in 1972, and first started working as a civil engineering manager at a property firm called EDA Investments, a big property firm that was owned by the Chung family.

Eventually, Tan began buying properties at a cheap price, during a time when the city was experiencing a property price slump. In 1975, Tan teamed up with a member of the Chung family to start up a company, and went on to buy a piece of land that is currently the site of Hong Kong Sanatorium & Hospital for HK$2.5 million, and sold it to the Government of Hong Kong a year later for HK$6.2 million.

=== Carrian Group ===
In 1979, Tan bought a controlling stake in a company named Mai Hon Holdings, and renamed the company Carrian. While Carrian was involved in a number of businesses, its core business was in real estate.

Carrian became known in Hong Kong after a subsidiary of the company bought Gammon House (now known as Bank of America Tower) in 1980 for nearly HK$1 billion, and then sold it for HK$1.7 billion. Its rapid expansion led to rumors over the source of its capital, with various rumors speculating the capital came from Imelda Marcos, Gosbank, and a lumber corporation in Borneo.

Carrian would later go on a buying spree of various businesses in the 1980s, including Cargo ships and shares of companies in a variety of industries, leading some commentators to say the company is akin to a "greedy housewife entering a supermarket and placing items she needs into her basket without regards to price". The company's business operations eventually encompassed shipping, travel, and taxi transportation.

Carrian Group's fortunes began to sour in 1982 when Chung Cheng Man, a major partner of Carrian and member of the Chung family (whose company Tan worked for after his arrival to Hong Kong), parted ways with Carrian due to his discovery of major debt accumulation from Carrian's business ventures. In return, Tan gave Chung a generous severance deal because Chung had knowledge of improprieties allegedly committed by Tan. This, along with a general economic downturn, led to a strained financial state for Carrian. The company eventually collapsed in a financial scandal.

== Arrest and imprisonment ==
Tan, along with a business associate, was arrested in October 1983 by Hong Kong authorities for making false and misleading statements. Tan was also accused by a government prosecutor of overstaying his visa and illegally living in Hong Kong for over a decade.

During the trial of Malaysian Chinese businessman Mak Foon Than over the 1983 murder of Bank Bumiputera Malaysia Berhad employee Jalil Ibrahim, Mak accused Tan of ordering the killing due to Jalil's alleged attempt to block a loan to Carrian. Tan's attorneys denied Mak's accusations.

Tan's legal troubles lasted 13 years, and included an acquittal from fraud charges in 1987 following a 19-month trial. He was jailed for three years in 1996 after admitting to his involvement in a conspiracy surrounding US$238 million in secret loans obtained from Bank Bumiputera Malaysia Berhad. He was released from custody in 1998.

== Post release ==
Following his release from custody, Tan was involved in a legal dispute with the son of Hang Seng Bank co-founder Lam Bing Yim, Rogerio Lam, over five antiques from the Song and Qing dynasties era that were lent to Tan during the 1980s.

As recently as 2014, Tan was noted to be living in semi-retirement at Clearwater Bay.

== Death ==
According to Chim Pui-chung, a former member of the Legislative Council and a trader who manipulated the stock price of Carrian Group, Tan passed away "more than two, approximately three years ago", during the COVID-19 pandemic. This was also verified earlier by Mary Jean Reimer through her YouTube livestream.

== Media portrayal ==
- The character Gordon Wing Muk-tong in 2020 TVB drama series Of Greed and Ants is noted to be based on Tan.
- The character Henry Ching in the 2023 Cantonese-language Hong Kong feature crime-drama film The Goldfinger is based on Tan.
