= The Wide World Magazine =

British monthly publication

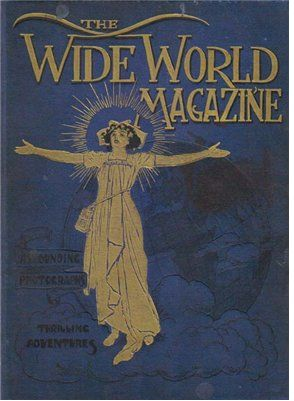
- The Wide World Magazine - half-yearly volume edition
- Founder: George Newnes
- First issue: April 1898; 127 years ago
- Final issue: December 1965
- Company: George Newnes Ltd
- Country: United Kingdom
- Language: English

The Wide World Magazine was a British monthly illustrated publication which ran from April 1898 to December 1965.

== History ==
The magazine was founded by well-known publisher George Newnes, also famous for Tit-Bits, The Strand Magazine, Country Life and others. It described itself as "an illustrated magazine of true narrative" and each month purported to feature "true-life" adventure and travel stories gathered from around the world. Its motto was "Truth is stranger than fiction".

In August 1898, it published the first in a number of installments of "The Adventures of Louis de Rougemont", billed as "the most amazing story a man ever lived to tell", and claiming to be an account of a man who had spent thirty years in the outback of Australia. The story caused a sensation, but was exposed as a hoax by the Daily Chronicle, to the embarrassment of the publisher.

Some famous names occasionally wrote for the magazine (such as Arthur Conan Doyle, Henry Morton Stanley, Douglas Reeman etc.), and it was copiously illustrated with photographs, as well as black and white drawings by such artists as Terence Cuneo, Stuart Tresilian, Alfred Pearse, Chas Sheldon, Paul Hardy, William Barnes Wollen, John L. Wimbush, Charles J. Staniland, Joseph Finnemore, John Charlton, Warwick Goble, Tom Browne, Ernest Prater, Gordon Browne, Edward S. Hodgson, Norman H. Hardy, Inglis Sheldon Williams, and Harry Rountree.

The May 1913 issue contained the first reports of the death of notorious outlaw Butch Cassidy in Bolivia.

Ben Macintyre, writing in 2004, humorously described the magazine as being about "brave chaps with large moustaches on stiff upper lips, who did stupid and dangerous things".

== Editions online ==
- Wide World Magazine, index at HathiTrust
- Wide World Magazine, volume 1 (April 1898–Sept 1898)
- Wide World Magazine, volume 2 (Nov 1898–April 1899)
- Wide World Magazine, volume 3 (May 1899–Oct 1899)
- Wide World Magazine, volume 4 (Nov 1899–April 1900)
- Wide World Magazine, volume 5 (May 1900–Oct 1900)
- Wide World Magazine, volume 6 (Nov 1900–April 1901)
- Wide World Magazine, volume 7 (Apr 1901–Sept 1901)
- Wide World Magazine, volume 8 (Nov 1901–April 1902)
- Wide World Magazine, volume 9 (May 1902–Oct 1902)
- Wide World Magazine, volume 10 (Nov 1902–April 1903)
- Wide World Magazine, volume 11 (May 1903–Oct 1903)
- Wide World Magazine, volume 12 (Nov 1903–April 1904)
- Wide World Magazine, volume 13 (May 1904–Oct 1904)
- Wide World Magazine, volume 14 (Nov 1904–April 1905)
- Wide World Magazine, volume 15 (May 1905–Oct 1905)
- Wide World Magazine, volume 16 (May 1906–Oct 1906)
- Wide World Magazine, volume 20 (Nov 1907–April 1908)
- Wide World Magazine, volume 21 (May 1908–Oct 1908)
- Wide World Magazine, volume 37 (May 1916–Oct 1916)
- Wide World Magazine, volume 38 (Nov 1916–Apr 1917)
- Wide World Magazine, volume 39 (May 1917–Oct 1917)
- Wide World Magazine, volume 40 (Nov 1917–Apr 1918)
- Wide World Magazine, volume 43 (May 1919–Oct 1919)
- Wide World Magazine, volume 44 (Nov 1919–Apr 1920)
- Wide World Magazine, volume 45 (May 1920–Oct 1920)
- Wide World Magazine, volume 49 (May 1922–Oct 1922)
- Wide World Magazine, volume 50 (Nov 1922–April 1923)

== Selected stories ==
- Safont, Paul, ed. (2004). The Wide World: True Adventures for Men. London: Macmillan. ISBN 1405049316.
- A floating Gold-mine (story from The Wide World Magazine, May 1907 – "Welcome to Brightlingsea")
