= Of Greed and Ants =

Hong Kong television drama series

- 黃金有罪
- Created by: Television Broadcasts Limited
- Starring: Eddie Cheung Siu-fai; Edwin Siu; Tony Hung; Elaine Yiu; Ben Wong; Jeannie Chan
- Opening theme: Chase For (快閃) by Fred Cheng
- Country of origin: Hong Kong
- No. of episodes: 30

Production
- Producer: Amy Wong
- Production locations: Hong Kong, Thailand
- Production company: TVB

Original release
- Network: TVB Jade
- Release: 6 January – 14 February 2020

Of Greed and Ants (Chinese: 黃金有罪; lit. 'Gold is Guilty') is a drama series produced by Hong Kong's Television Broadcasts Limited that is based on the history and scandal surrounding the Carrian Group and its founder, George Tan. The drama also makes numerous references to the 1980s.

The series aired in January 2020, and concluded its run on 14 February that same year.

== Plot ==
The series is set in Hong Kong during the 1970s, a period marked by rapid economic growth. Thai Chinese Gordon Wing Muk-Tong's perspective on life shifted after his father met a tragic end at the hands of gangsters in Thailand, prompting him to leave for Hong Kong. Witnessing the influence of the stock market, he resolved to become a stock manipulator to exert control it. His ascent to power impacts the lives of two young men as he gradually gains influence.

== Reception ==
It was given a rating of 7.1/10 on Douban and received 2 billion views in China. The way the story is unfolded is similar to the commercially successful 1992 TVB drama The Greed of Man whereby flashbacks were used.
