= Louis de Rougemont =

Swiss Explorer

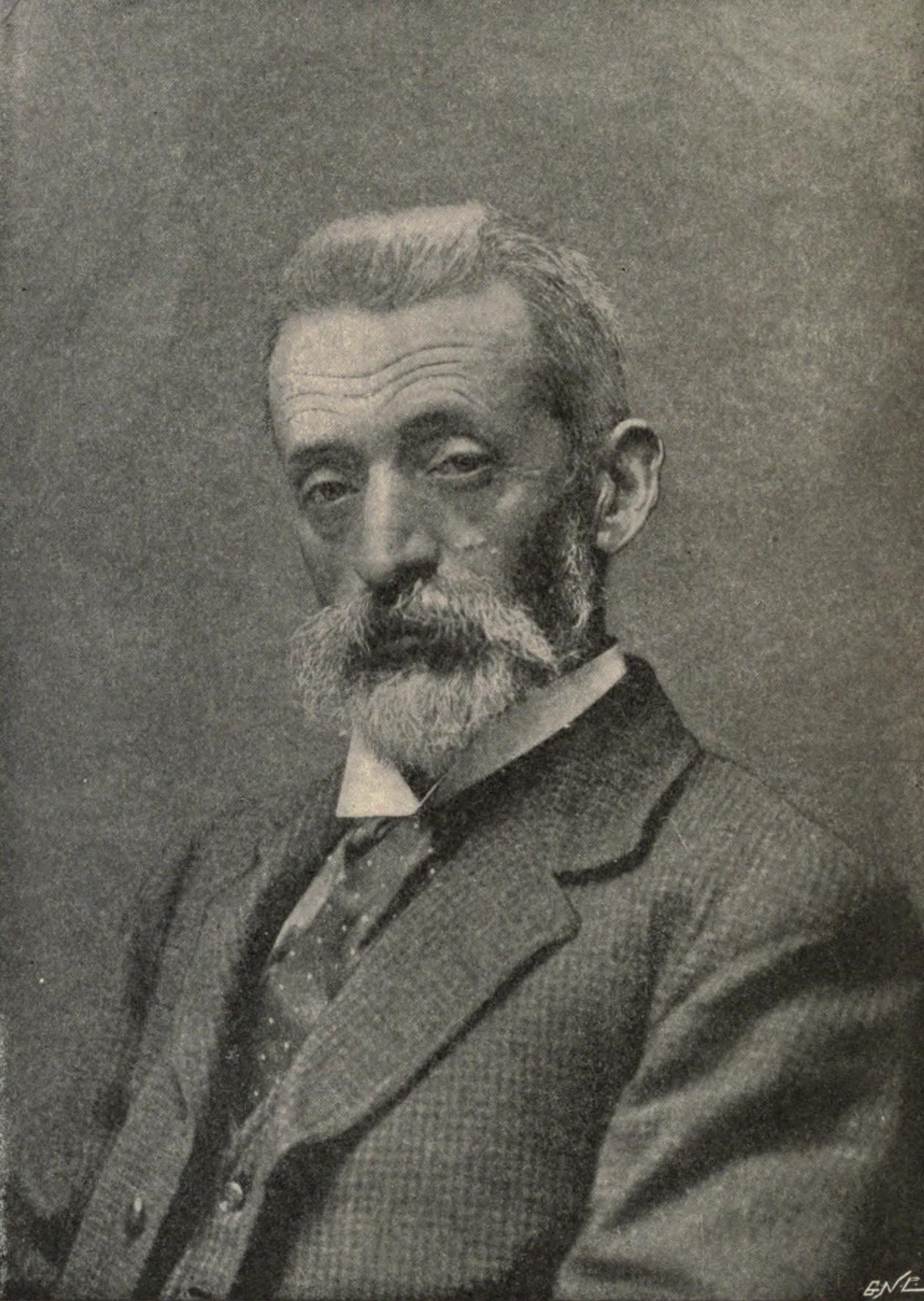
- Born: Henri Louis Grin; 12 November 1847; Gressy, Switzerland
- Died: 9 June 1921 (aged 73); London, England
- Occupation: various
- Known for: Posing as an explorer

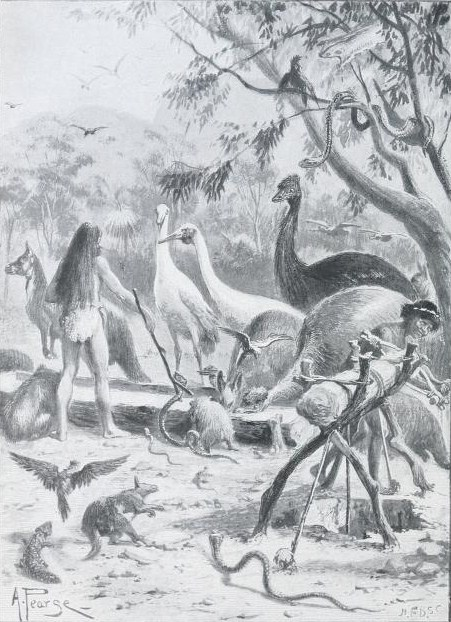
Illustration to a story by De Rougemont (Alfred Pearse, The Wide World Magazine, 1899)

Louis De Rougemont (12 November 1847 – 9 June 1921) was a Swiss explorer who claimed to have had adventures in Australasia.

== Personal history ==
"De Rougemont" was born Henri Louis Grin in 1847 in Gressy, Vaud, Switzerland. He left home at the age of sixteen. He became a footman to the actress Fanny Kemble, servant to a Swiss banker de Mieville in 1870 and a butler for the Governor of Western Australia, Sir William Robinson. In the latter job he lasted less than a year.

He tried various ventures with very little success. He worked as a doctor, a "spirit photographer" and an inventor. He also married and abandoned a wife in Australia.

In 1898 he began to write about his invented adventures in the British periodical The Wide World Magazine under the name Louis De Rougemont. He described his alleged exploits in search of pearls and gold in New Guinea, and claimed to have spent thirty years living with Indigenous Australians in the outback. He claimed that the tribe with whom he had lived had worshipped him as a god. He also claimed to have encountered the Gibson expedition of 1874.

Various readers expressed disbelief in his tales from the start, for example, claiming that no one can actually ride a turtle. De Rougemont had also claimed to have seen flying wombats. The fact that he could not place his travels on a map aroused suspicion. Readers' arguments in the pages of the Daily Chronicle and other London newspapers continued for months.

Rougemont subjected himself to examination by the Royal Geographical Society. He claimed that he could not specify exactly where he had been because he had signed a non-disclosure agreement with a syndicate that wanted to exploit the gold he had found in the area. He also refused to talk about Aboriginal languages he had supposedly learned. Still his supporters continued to find precedents for his exploits.

In September 1898 the Daily Chronicle announced that a certain F.W. Solomon had recognized De Rougemont and identified him as Louis Grin, who had presented himself at Solomon's firm as an entrepreneur. Grin had collected tidbits for his exploits from the Reading Room of the British Museum. Edwin Greenslade Murphy had helped to expose him.

Grin tried to defend himself by writing a letter to The Daily Chronicle, using his original name, in which he expressed his consternation that anybody would confuse him with Louis De Rougemont. The Daily Chronicle was very willing to publish the letter. The Wide World Magazine exploited the situation and prepared a Christmas double issue. Sales of both papers increased greatly. De Rougemont himself disappeared from view.

During 1899 Grin travelled to South Africa as a music-hall attraction, "the greatest liar on Earth". On a similar tour of Australia in 1901 he was booed from the stage. In July 1906 he appeared at the London Hippodrome and successfully demonstrated his turtle-riding skills. During the First World War he reappeared as an inventor of a useless meat substitute. He died a poor man in London on 9 June 1921.

G.K. Chesterton gave an account of a meeting he had with Grin in his 1925 philosophical work The Everlasting Man. The encounter opens Part 1, Chapter 8 'The End of the World'.

It was said of the would-be adventurer:

Truth is stranger than fiction
But De Rougemont is stranger than both

— The Wide World Magazine, June 1899, No. 14
