= Somewhere Beyond the Mist =

2017 Hong Kong film by King Cheung

- Chinese: 藍天白雲
- Directed by: King Cheung
- Written by: King Cheung
- Produced by: Derek Yee
- Starring: Stephy Tang; Rachel Leung; Zeno Koo; Baby Bo; Kyle Li
- Edited by: King Cheung
- Release date: 2017
- Running time: 88 minutes
- Country: Hong Kong
- Language: Cantonese

Somewhere Beyond the Mist (Chinese: 藍天白雲) is a 2017 Hong Kong drama film directed by King Cheung, with action choreography by Paco Yick Tin-Hung. It was the winning project of the first First Feature Film Initiative and was funded by the Hong Kong Film Development Fund. The film stars Stephy Tang, Rachel Leung, Zeno Koo, Baby Bo, and Kyle Li. The story is inspired by a real-life murder case in the United States involving a Hong Kong teenager and her boyfriend. Somewhere Beyond the Mist made its world premiere at the Busan International Film Festival (BIFF) on 15 October 2017.

== Plot ==
The story centers around a mysterious murder case. Connie, a high school student born with a congenital heart defect and having few friends, plans to murder her parents but, recognizing her physical frailty, lures her classmate Eric into the plot. Together, they become accomplices. After the murders, Connie shows no remorse. The case is assigned to Inspector Angela. Newly married with Tony and living with her father, who has dementia, Angela is expecting her first child. Although she appears to have a happy family life, Angela finds herself increasingly invested and affected by the case. Gradually, she begins to understand what led Connie down such a dark and irreversible path.

== Production ==
While living in the United States in 2000, Cheung came across a news story about a Hong Kong teenager, Connie Leung, and her African-American boyfriend, Eric Louissaint, who conspired to murder her parents and dumped their bodies in the East River. Deeply moved by the tragedy, Cheung wrote the first draft of an award-winning script God's Apple.

The script was shelved for seventeen years until Cheung revisited it for the First Feature Film Initiative. After extensive revisions, the story was adapted into his debut feature film. To better resonate with Hong Kong audiences, Cheung relocated the story's setting from the United States to a rural village house in Yuen Long, Hong Kong, aged the characters down to high school students, and incorporated local social issues into the narrative.

== Cast ==
- Stephy Tang as Angela
- Rachel Leung as Connie
- Zeno Koo as Eric
- Chan Cheuk-man as Leung Man-yung (Connie's father)
- Kyle Li as Tony (Angela's husband)
- Jimmy Wong Shee Tong as Dr. Ho (Angela's father)

== Awards ==
Year	Award	Category	Recipient	Result
2018	13th Hong Kong Film Directors' Guild Awards	Best New Performer	Rachel Leung	Won
2018	1st MOVIE6 Hong Kong Movie Awards	Best Supporting Actress	Baby Bo	Nominated
2018	1st MOVIE6 Hong Kong Movie Awards	Best New Performer	Rachel Leung	Nominated
2018	37th Hong Kong Film Awards	Best Screenplay	King Cheung	Nominated
2018	37th Hong Kong Film Awards	Best New Performer	Rachel Leung	Nominated
2018	37th Hong Kong Film Awards	Best Supporting Actress	Baby Bo	Nominated
2019	2nd The Kongest film awards	Kongest Film	Somewhere Beyond the Mist	Nominated
2019	2nd The Kongest film awards	My Favorite Hong Kong Film	Somewhere Beyond the Mist	Nominated
2019	2nd The Kongest film awards	Kongest Director	King Cheung	Nominated
2019	2nd The Kongest film awards	Kongest Actress	Rachel Leung	Nominated
2019	2nd The Kongest film awards	Kongest Actress	Stephy Tang	Nominated
