= Sexpedia =

Hong Kong television series

- Genre: Romantic comedy
- Written by: Cheung Chi-yin; Sin Siu-ling
- Directed by: Wong Wing-shan
- Starring: Jason Chan; Joman Chiang; Jan Tse; Alan Luk; Maggie Wong; Zeno Koo; Calvin Lui; Cherry Pau; Rachel Lam
- Country of origin: Hong Kong
- Original language: Cantonese
- No. of episodes: 12

Production
- Production location: Hong Kong
- Camera setup: Multi-camera
- Running time: 42–47 minutes
- Production company: Hong Kong Television Network

Original release
- Release: 13 April – 28 April 2015

Sexpedia (Chinese: 大眾情性) was a 2015 Hong Kong romantic comedy television series produced by Hong Kong Television Network. The first episode premiered on 13 April 2015.

Over a year after the series was released, rival television station TVB released a similarly themed series, Come with Me, on its online streaming platform.

== Cast ==
- Jason Chan as Dicky Ko Tik, an IT technician suffering from erectile dysfunction
- Joman Chiang as Kuk Choi-yi, a sex toy salesperson
- Jan Tse as Dr Selina Mok Chui-lin, a sex therapist who occasionally acts as a narrator to convey knowledge about sex to the audience
- Alan Luk as Moses Ng
- Maggie Wong as Milk Ng
- Zeno Koo as Joe Ng
- Calvin Lui as Daniel
- Cherry Pau as Cheung Chin-chin, a registered nurse
- Rachel Lam as Ho Siu-cho, an airline hostess
- Kwok Fung as Kuk Choi-yi's father
- Tong Chun-ming as Nelson, a crossdresser and Selina's husband
- Casper Chan as Toby, a friend of Cheung Chin-chin
- Pancy Chan as Sharon
- Luvin Ho as Peggy
- Anita Kwan as Elaine
- Jacky Yeung as Wallace
- Danel Yu as Cathy, episode 1 and 12
- Franco Chan as Mr. Cho, episode 2
- Eunice Ho as Cheung Lai-fong, episode 2
- Eddie Li as Sunny with premature ejaculation, episode 4
- Karen Lee as Monica, episode 4
- Homan Ho as Mr. Ho, episode 6
- Janice Ting as Mrs. Ho, episode 6
- Leila Tong as herself portraying as Ting Siu-hoi from The Borderline, guest star episode 8
- Lawrence Chou as himself portraying as Choi Ying-yeung from The Borderline, guest star episode 8
- Candy Chu as Sa Sa who is into sadomasochism, episode 8
- Brian Wong as Sa Sa's boyfriend, episode 8
- Nick Chong as Jing, episode 10

== Release ==
A 10-minute preview was released on HKTV's YouTube channel on 1 April 2015.
