= Rachel Leung =

Hong Kong actress (born 1993)

- 梁雍婷
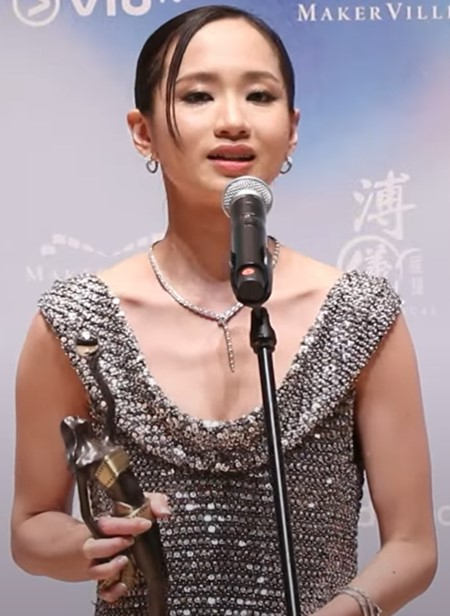
- Leung in April 2024
- Born: Leung Yung-ting; 1993 (age 32–33); Hong Kong
- Education: Hong Kong Baptist University (BA)
- Occupation: Actress
- Years active: 2018–present

Rachel Leung Yung-ting (Chinese: 梁雍婷; born 1993) is a Hong Kong actress best known for her debut role as Connie in the drama film Somewhere Beyond the Mist (2018) and supporting role as Siu Ling in the drama film In Broad Daylight (2023), for which she won Best Supporting Actress in the 17th Asian Film Awards and Best Supporting Actress in the 42nd Hong Kong Film Awards with the latter role.

== Biography ==
Leung was born in 1993, to a Hong Kong father and Thai mother. She studied at an international school and was motivated to become an actress after watching Natalie Portman's performance in the film Black Swan when she was 16. After graduating from secondary school, she attended the Academy of Film at Hong Kong Baptist University and was mentored by actor and guest lecturer Liu Kai-chi. She graduated with a Bachelor of Arts in film and television and was recommended to audition for the role in the drama film Somewhere Beyond the Mist by Liu.

Leung landed her first major onscreen role as a teenage murderer in the drama film Somewhere Beyond the Mist in 2014. The film was cinematically released in 2018 and she was nominated for Best New Performer in the 37th Hong Kong Film Awards. She received minor roles in several drama films after her breakthrough performance, including the 2021 romantic comedy film Ready o/r Knot. In 2022, Leung was cast as one of the five co-leading actresses in the romance film Far Far Away, alongside Jennifer Yu, Hanna Chan, Cecilia So and Crystal Cheung.

In 2023, Leung appeared in the drama film In Broad Daylight as a mentally-disabled resident in a care home who was sexually harassed by the warden. She won Best Supporting Actress in the 17th Asian Film Awards and Best Supporting Actress in the 42nd Hong Kong Film Awards, as well as a nomination for Best Supporting Actress in the 60th Golden Horse Awards with her critically acclaimed performance. Leung also appeared in the drama film Time Still Turns the Pages and reprised her role in Ready or Rot, the sequel of Ready o/r Knot, in the same year.

== Filmography ==
=== Film ===
Year	Title	Role	Notes/Ref.
2018	Somewhere Beyond the Mist	Connie	
2019	Ciao UFO	Cat	
2021	Ready o/r Knot	Lok Wah Charizard	
2021	Raging Fire	Bonnie Kwan	
2022	Far Far Away	Mena	
2022	The Sparring Partner	Ho Man Yee (賀敏兒)	
2022	A Light Never Goes Out	Victoria	
2022	Lost Love	Ching Ching's mother	Guest starring
2023	Ready or Rot	Lok Wah Charizard	
2023	In Broad Daylight	Wong Siu Ling (黃小鈴)	
2023	Time Still Turns the Pages	Zoey	
2024	All Shall Be Well	Kitty	
2024	Stuntman	Sam Lee's wife	
2024	The Last Dance	Soso (蘇蘇)	

=== Television ===
Year	Title	Role	Notes/Ref.
2016	3X1	Ping (萍)	Guest role
2019	Haters Gonna Stay	Student	Cameo
2024	Margaret and David Tie	Aletta	Recurring role

== Awards and nominations ==
Year	Award	Category	Work	Result	Ref.
2018	Hong Kong Film Directors' Guild Awards 2018	Best New Performer	Somewhere Beyond the Mist	Won	
2018	37th Hong Kong Film Awards	Best New Performer	Somewhere Beyond the Mist	Nominated	
2023	60th Golden Horse Awards	Best Supporting Actress	In Broad Daylight	Nominated	
2023	30th Hong Kong Film Critics Society Award	Best Actress	In Broad Daylight	Nominated	
2024	17th Asian Film Awards	Best Supporting Actress	In Broad Daylight	Won	
2024	42nd Hong Kong Film Awards	Best Supporting Actress	In Broad Daylight	Won	
2025	43rd Hong Kong Film Awards	Best Supporting Actress	The Last Dance	Nominated	
