= John L. Wimbush =

English painter

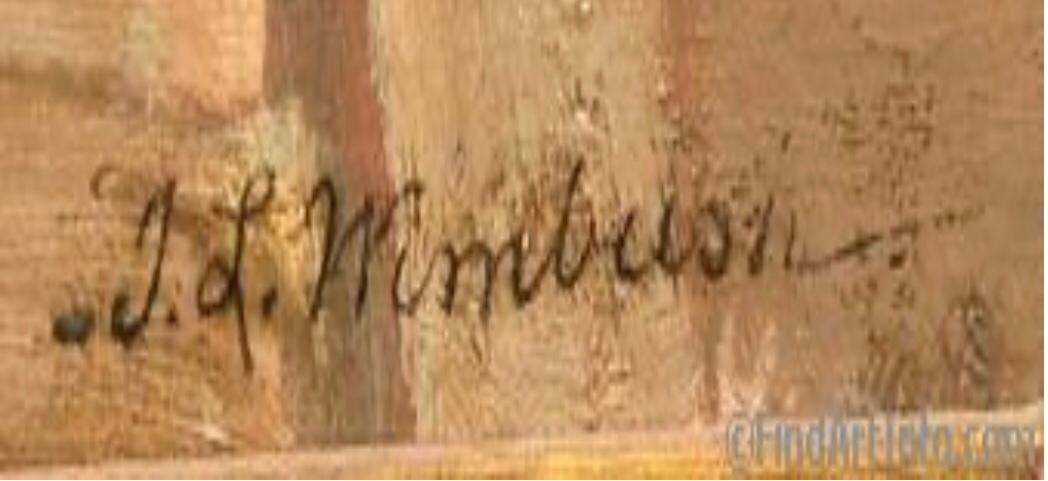
- Born: John Winbush; January 1854; London, UK
- Died: 15 March 1914 (aged 60); Totnes, UK
- Known for: Landscape and portrait painting

John L. Wimbush (January 1854 – 15 March 1914) was an English landscape and portrait painter.

Born in London, England, Wimbush first exhibited at the Royal Academy in 1889 and went on to mount several other exhibitions there over the years.

The spelling Wimbush is not found in his birth record. It is believed that letter 'L' did not stand for anything. It was just an initial. He died at Totnes – an artistic area in Devon on the South Coast – age 60 on 15 March 1914. A newspaper report in the Exeter & Plymouth Gazette ( 19 March 1914) shows that Wimbush died in the Dartmouth Cottage Hospital and was actually a resident of Dartmouth. He was buried at Townstal ( NOT Totnes ) - 18 March, and had lived a long time in Dartmouth where he was a benefactor to several groups.

== Bishopsgate and Warwick ==
John L. Wimbush's father was Edward John Winbush, Licensed Victualler (from 1856) of the Magpie and Punchbowl hotel, Bishopsgate. From records at the General Register Office, a 'John Winbush' was born in London in January 1854 probably at the hotel. He was baptised in the family church, St Ethelburga's Bishopsgate, on 12 February 1854. John was the second born and the second son of a family of 11. He ultimately had 5 brothers and 4 sisters. The building 100 Bishopsgate now stands on the original site of the Magpie and Punchbowl.

On the 1871 census Winbush was registered as living at 58 Bishopgate Street London. He was listed as an 'Artist student'. At this time he was 17 years of age. On the census document his name was given as John Winbush.

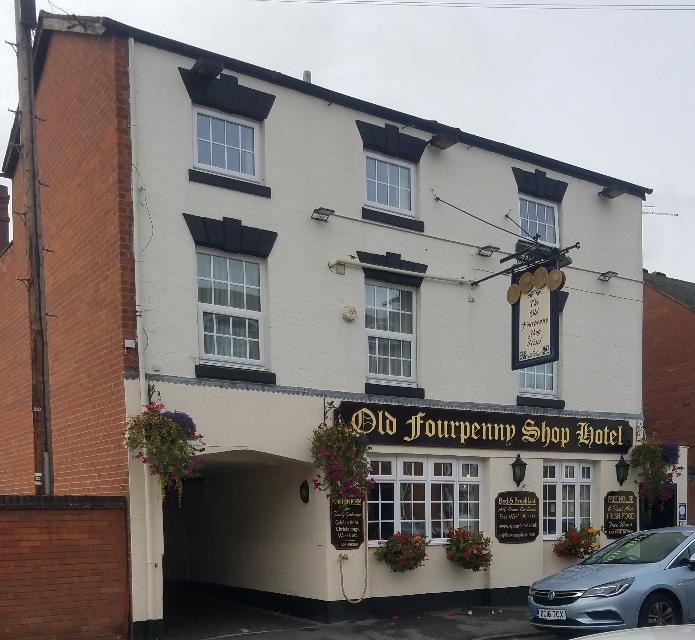
Old Fourpenny Shop hotel, Warwick

His grandfather John Wimbush (also spelt Winbush and born circa 1791), was the Licensed Victualler (from 1849) of the Old Fourpenny Shop hotel, Warwick. John L. Wimbush possibly spent some time living with his Wimbush grandfather in Warwick. In both 1891 census and the 1901 census he had registered as being born in Warwick.

In those days, there were many alternative spellings for family names. As all the Winbush children were well educated, it appears that there was a definite decision on his part to change the spelling of his name. As there was another artist, Henry B Wimbush, John Wimbush may have wanted to differentiate the two Wimbush names and added the 'L.' From then on he went by the name John L. Wimbush. However, in his final years (for the 1911 census in Devon) he used the name, John Lewis Winbush.

John Wimbush developed as an artist and around 1874 had his own studio. Initially he may have shared the studio with other artists.

== Fitzroy Street ==
Initially Wimbush was based in London. He became a friend of the American painter, James McNeill Whistler. Whistler lived for a time at No. 8 Fitzroy Square in Camden Town. John Wimbush's career as an artist was centred around this same area for the last part of the 19th century. Wimbush moved in artist circles and his path would have crossed with many other major artists of the day. There was a vibrant community of artists around Fitzroy Square and Fitzroy Street. He was friends with the artist Albert Ludovici. One of Wimbush's friends was Walter Sickert. Sickert took up painting in 1881. He then became a pupil and etching assistant to James Whistler. Although Sickert was 8 years younger than John they may have been fellow students. Sickert later became a prominent art teacher and the subject of the book, Portrait of a Killer: Jack the Ripper—Case Closed.

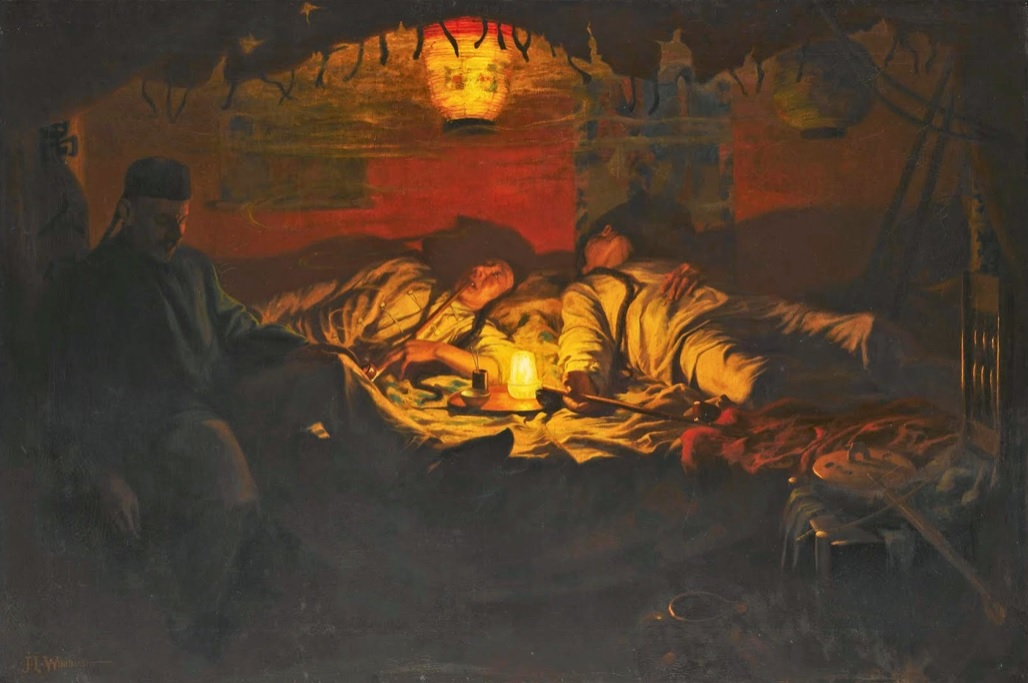
An opium den at Lime Street – titled in 1889 as – Lingering Clouds

A painting by Wimbush, An opium den At Lime Street was painted in 1889. It is the only painting known that includes an address. The Lime Street referred to is in the district of Limehouse. Lime Street is less than 1 kilometre from Bishopsgate. Limehouse and Lime Street sometimes mistakenly thought to be derived from the nickname for the seamen that disembarked there, who had earned the name Lime—juicers or limeys after the obligatory ration of lime juice the Royal Navy gave their sailors to ward off scurvy. The area achieved notoriety for opium dens in the late 19th century, often featured in pulp fiction works by Sax Rohmer and others. The name Limehouse, originally spelt Lymehouse, actually goes back to the 1300s and referred to the lime kilns that were once there.

Wimbush exhibited at the Royal Academy of Arts in 1889, 1899, 1900, 1901, 1902, 1903, 1904. The painting An opium den At Lime Street was exhibited (as work 1772) in 1889, then titled Lingering Clouds.

The Mutualart website notes:

John L. Wimbush is a 19th Century painter. John L. Wimbush's work has been offered at auction multiple times, with realised prices raining from $338 USD to $53,278 USD, depending on the size and medium of the artwork. Since 1998 the record price for this artist at an auction is $53,278 USD for An Opium Den at Lime Street, sold at Sotheby's London in 2008.

Sotheby's auction notes said that the painting An opium den at Lime Street was valued at £40,000 – 60,000 and sold for £36,050. In 2008 £36,050 converts to the US$53,278 figure given above. It is signed J.L. WIMBUSH.: further signed, titled and inscribed on an old label attached to the stretcher oil on canvas

101 by 152 cm.: 40 by 60 in.

PROVENANCE Lucian Freud and thence to his friend Charlie Thomas who gave the picture to Marianne Faithfull; Private Collection EXHIBITED

Possibly Royal Academy, 1889, no. 1772 as Lingering Clouds

An Opium Den at Lime Street John L. Wimbush

The following notes on the painting, An opium den at Lime Street are found on the 'Invaluable' web-site.

Notes: PROPERTY OF A GENTLEMAN

'I am engulfed, and drown deliciously. Soft music like a perfume, and sweet light Golden with audible odours exquisite, Swathe me with cerements for eternity. Time is no more. I pause and yet I flee. A million ages wrap me round with night. I drain a million ages of delight. I hold the future in memory.'

It is likely that this picture is the one entitled Lingering Clouds exhibited at the Royal Academy in 1889, the title alluding to the rings of thick smoke swirling above the recumbent figures in an East End opium den. The image of the Chinatown opium den run by wicked Oriental immigrants luring innocent Westerners into a life of destitution and addiction, was one made popular in late nineteenth century literature and lurid newspaper stories. East London opium dens appear in Charles Dickens' The Mystery of Edward Drood and famously in Oscar Wilde's 'Picture of Dorian Gray' and the Sherlock Holmes adventure "The Man with the Twisted Lip". The most infamous dens were at New Court in Shadwell and colourful newspaper accounts of denizens of New Court were popular abounded. The poet Arthur Symons, whose description of opium smoking is given above, wrote to a friend in 1892 and gave this enlightening account of the hold that the drug had on the addicted: 'I open this again to tell you of a strange girl I met at Franhaus' [the home of a popular novelist of the time] last night – an extraordinary looking young Jewess, about 20, with a long lithe body like a snakes. Great red dangerous mouth, and enormous dark amber eyes that half shut and then expand like great poisonous flowers. 'Nuffing amuses me,' she said, with her curious childish lisp, 'everything bores me. Nuffing ever did amuse me. I have nuffing to amuse me, nobody to be amused with. I don't care for men, women's talk always bores me. What am I to do? I don't know what to do with myself. All I care for is to sleep. Tell me what is there that will give me a new sensation? And she lay back and gazed at me through half-shut lids. I bent down and whispered 'Opium.' Her eyes opened with almost a flat of joy. 'Yes, there is opium. Where can I get it?' (Antony Clayton, Decadent London – Fin de Siecle City, 2005, p. 81)

Although many potentially dangerous and addictive narcotics were readily available over the counter at many Victorian pharmacies, towards the end of the nineteenth century, opium was increasingly perceived to be a great threat to the moral fabric of the country. Following the two Opium Wars, the trade from China to Europe expanded greatly, from a hundred tons in 1800 to two thousand tons in 1837. The advances in steam navigation in the 1870s led to an influx in Chinese immigrants to Europe and with them came a ready supply of the drug and the proprietors of the dens that opened in the slums of the larger cities. Newspapers and authors portrayed London as the European centre of opium smoking particularly around Limehouse and Shadwell, but this was unjustified and the number of regular visitors to London opium dens probably did not exceed a few hundred and no nineteenth-century photograph has ever been found of a London opium smoker. The image of the debauched and sordid opium addict languishing in East End dens was largely the invention of artists and writers.

In Wimbush's painting, the three figures are Chinese men clearly under the influence of opium and the purpose of the picture appears to have been to depict a social ill threatening the moralities of the age. The men are reclining on a low bed so that they are able to hold the long pipes used for smoking the opium, heated over the glowing lamp shown on a tray brought by a servant. This painting has a fascinating provenance having been owned by the artist Lucien Freud and later by the singer Marianne Faithfull.

The word 'provenance' means a chronology of ownership. Lucien Freud was the grandson of Sigmund Freud and was himself a well known British artist specialising in figurative art. Marianne Faithfull, was the girlfriend of Mick Jagger of The Rolling Stones.

A letter from James McNeill Whistler refers to John Wimbush. In the letter to a Mrs Pennell, dated 28 November 1897, Whistler closes with:

I wish you would send for Ludovici – and read him my letters, that he may know, for I am fond of him, and he will then be ready to meet Sickert when he comes upon him in the little restaurant in Charlotte Street. He might ask Walter if he is writing a pleasing article for the Baronet on the trial. Ludovici must tell Wimbush. Take care of this letter – we may require it.

'Ludovici must tell Wimbush' was written in the right-hand margin at right angles to the main text. Charlotte Street starts just a couple of houses from 8 Fitzroy Street and is a continuation of Fitzroy Street.

The painting Waiting for a Bite is signed J. L. Wimbush/1901 (lower left) and signed 'Royal Academy Exhibition/No 2/J. L. Wimbush/8 Fitzroy Street/Fitzroy Square/Waiting a Bite' (on the artist's label, attached to the reverse). This gives us an address for John Wimbush as 8 Fitzroy Street but also Fitzroy Square. There is a bit of confusion here as 8 Fitzroy Street is a few doors away from Fitzroy Square. 8 Fitzroy Square is a separate place. 8 Fitzroy Square is where Whistler lived for a time. This painting, Waiting for a Bite, has been made into a jigsaw.

It is known that Whistler used Wimbush's studio at Fitzroy Street for photography late in the 1890s. He brought in some photographers to take pictures of his paintings.

As the light was not good for the photographer, some canvasses were moved out in the hall, some were put on the roof, but the best place was discovered to be Mr. Wimbush's studio on the same building.

In 1901 Wimbush's studio was in Fitzroy Street. This and Fitzroy Square is the address for Wimbush's studio while he was in London in the 1890s and early 1900s.

James Whistler died in 1903. For a time early in the 1900s, after Wimbush left for Dartmouth in Devon, 8 Fitzroy Street became Walter Sickert's studio. In 1907 Sickert formed the Fitzroy Street Group, an organisation created to support artists. This group first met at 8 Fitzroy Street before moving to 19 Fitzroy Street. In 1917 Sickert painted Entrance to 8 Fitzroy Street, Whistler's Studio. Although, Sickert's painting refers to 'Whistler's Studio' it may have been Wimbush's studio that Whistler was using at the time.

From the 1800s and into the early 1900s Fitzroy Street developed a reputation as a Bohemian area. Numerous people of note lived in the vicinity. The artists, writers and intellectuals who lived and worked in the area in the late 19th and early 20th century included Clive Bell, Ford Madox Brown, Quentin Crisp, Thomas Musgrave Joy, John Maynard Keynes, Karl Marx, George Orwell, Lytton Strachey, Dylan Thomas, Arthur Rimbaud, George Bernard Shaw, and Virginia Woolf. Lord Salisbury served as the Prime Minister of the United Kingdom three times over 13 years starting in 1885. His home was at 21 Fitzroy Square.

== Dartmouth ==
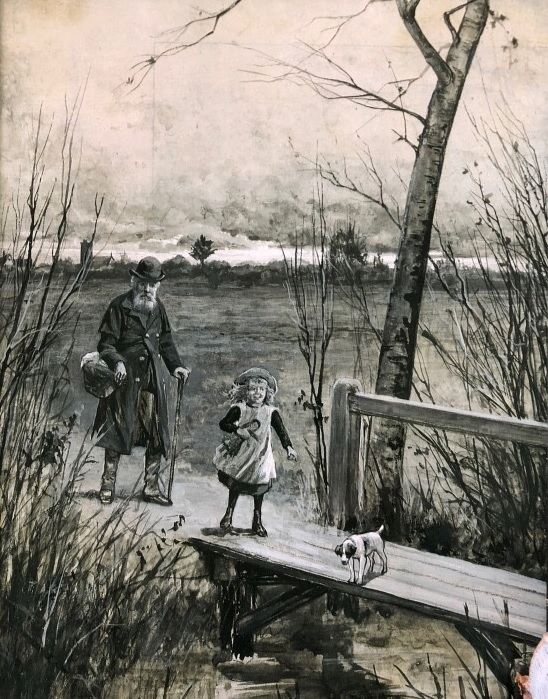
Untitled drawing by John L. Wimbush – at St Gennys, Crackington Haven, North Cornwell, UK

According to Whistler's web-site John Wimbush moved to Dartmouth around 1902. Why he moved to Dartmouth and where exactly in that location his studio and residence was is also unknown.

Interestingly the painter Henry B. Wimbush also did numerous illustrations and drawings around Devon and Cornwall at this time and possibly the website devoted to Whistler above confuses the two. Henry B. Wimbush was a book illustrator and postcard artist.

In Dartmouth, he painted the mayor, Charles Peek. This painting is currently held at the Dartmouth Guildhall. Charles Peek was mayor from 1911 to 1914 and then again from 1919 to 1921. The date on the Charles Peek painting is 1912. This would have been one of the last paintings done by Wimbush as he died 2 years later in 1914. Some of his paintings included a small white dog with black marking which was thought to be his. In the 1911 Devon census a 'John Lewis Winbush', is listed, with profession as a 'painter artist'. The surname in this entry is 'Winbush', not 'Wimbush', with the middle-name as 'Lewis', rather than the letter 'L'.

John Wimbush died in the artistic area of Totnes in Devon 15 March 1914 at age 60 - just prior to the start of World War 1. Totnes is about 25 kilometres north west of Dartmouth. He is possibly buried in the Totnes cemetery as J L Wimbush.

Wimbush left a will with probate dated 2 February 1915. His estate went to his older brother Edward Thomas Winbush, science master and to Thomas Braithwaite, jeweler. His effects totaled £73 16s 7d.

A list of some of his paintings provided below. A number were auctioned in the years 1993 – 2018.

The Australian architect Harry Winbush is a nephew of John Wimbush.

== A list of major paintings by John L. Wimbush ==
The mischievous magpie 29.8 x 24.1 cm 1886 12 March 1997

An Opium Den At Lime Street J. L. Wimbush Further signed, titled and inscribed on an old label attached to the stretcher 1889 £36,050 Sotheby's 9 December 2008

Waiting for a bite J. L. Wimbush /1901 Inscribed and signed 'Royal Academy Exhibition/No 2/J. L. Wimbush/8 Fitzroy Street/Fitzroy Square/ Waiting a Bite' (on the artist's label, attached to the reverse) Oil on canvas 1901 Christie's 15 March 2012

The Music Lesson J. L. Wimbush 188’ Oil on canvas 60.9 x 45.7 cm £1,155 – £1,650 Invaluable

A cook preparing the fish John L. Wimbush A cook preparing the fish, signed lower right and unclearly dated oil on canvas, 60.5 x 51 cm £800 – £1200 Venduehuis, The Hague 15 November 2017

A peasant woman in a headscarf 38 x 28 cm Oil on board

The toy seller J. L. Wimbush Pair with The vegetable barrow 76.8 x 51.1 cm £5000 – £7000 (for the pair) Invaluable September/ 3 December 2008

The vegetable barrow J. L. Wimbush Pair with The toy seller 76.8 x 51.1 cm £5000 – £7000 (for the pair) Invaluable September/ 3 December 2008

Man with music score John L. Wimbush Oil on canvas, 60 x 45 cm framed £370

Wash day 2 June 1993

The night watch John L. Wimbush Oil on board, 20 x 33 cm unframed Undisclosed Rowley Fine Art Auctioneers 31 August 2016

As Cores da Arte John L. Wimbush

An English sailor John L. Wimbush Oil on canvas 51 x 36 cm

A girl Turning Heads as she returns from market John L. Wimbush Oil painting on canvas, framed canvas size: 102 x 59 cm plus frame provenance: Delightful, large scale Victorian genre oil painting depicting a young girls turning heads in Private UK collection 11 September 2018

Turning Heads (Series) John L. Wimbush Large Victorian Oils

Portrait of a girl Dartmouth Museum

The jester Dartmouth Museum

Charles Peek, Mayor of Dartmouth 1912 Dartmouth Guildhall

The art market website Artnet has a list of Wimbush paintings.

== See also ==
- The Wide World Magazine

== Notes ==
Hotels operated within the John Wimbush family:

- The Magpie and Punchbowl hotel (Victuallers: Wimbush's parents from 1862 to 1871)
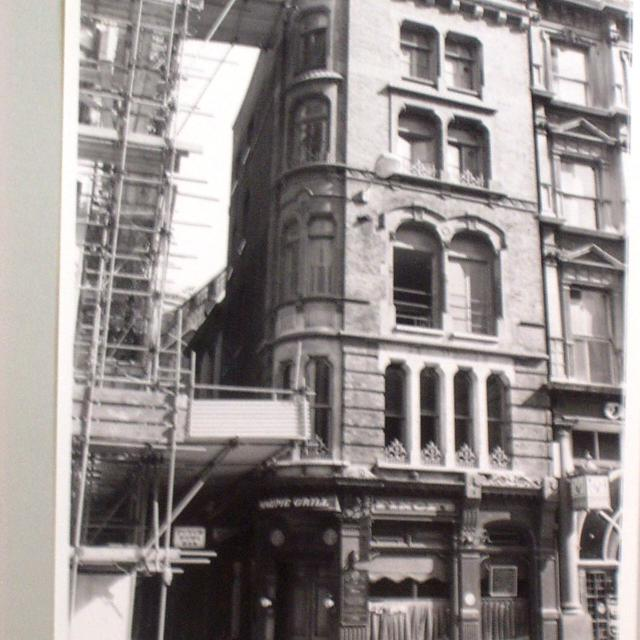
  Magpie and Punchbowl Pub Bishopsgate and Clerks Lane London
  The site was originally numbered 58 Bishopsgate, then was renumbered to 86 Bishopsgate, and reconstructed and renamed, City House. Subsequently, the buildings between St Ethelburga's and Camomile Street were demolished to make way for 100 Bishopsgate.
- The Old Fourpenny Shop hotel (Victuallers: Wimbush's paternal grandparents from 1849 to 1862) in Warwick, was originally named the Paul Pry Inn, then the Warwick Tavern before being renamed as the Old Fourpenny Shop hotel, being the only hotel of this set still operating.
- The Three Jolly Gardners hotel (Victuallers: Wimbush's maternal (Stephens) family from 1834 to 1871) 103 Union Street, Southwark.
- The Plough hotel (Victuallers, Wimbush's maternal (Stephens) family until 1881) located at 1 High Street, Lewisham.
- The Duke of Wellington hotel (Victualler: Wimbush's older brother (Edward) 1887) located at 9 Wyndham Road, Camberwell.
