= A Light Never Goes Out =

2022 Hong Kong film by Anastasia Tsang

- Promotional poster
- Traditional Chinese: 燈火闌珊
- Simplified Chinese: 灯火阑珊
- Literal meaning: "Dimming lights"
- Hanyu Pinyin: Dēng huǒ lán shān
- Jyutping: dang1 fo2 laan4 saan1
- Directed by: Anastasia Tsang
- Written by: Anastasia Tsang; Tsoi So-man
- Produced by: Saville Chan
- Starring: Sylvia Chang; Simon Yam; Cecilia Choi; Henick Chou
- Cinematography: Leung Ming Kai
- Edited by: Nose Chan
- Music by: Alan Wong; Janet Yung
- Production company: A Light Never Goes Out Ltd.
- Release dates: October 25, 2022 (Tokyo); March 2, 2023 (Hong Kong)
- Running time: 103 minutes
- Country: Hong Kong
- Language: Cantonese

A Light Never Goes Out (Chinese: 燈火闌珊; pinyin: Dēnghuǒ lánshān; lit. 'Dimming Lights') is a 2022 Hong Kong drama film produced by Saville Chan and directed by Anastasia Tsang in her directorial debut. The film had its world premiere at the 2022 Tokyo International Film Festival. The film was the winner of 5th First Feature Film Initiative and received funding from the Film Development Fund. It was also selected to represent Hong Kong in the Best International Feature Film category at the 96th Academy Awards, but was later revealed to have been disqualified for currently undisclosed reasons.

== Premise ==
Devastated by the loss of her skilled neon sign-making husband, a wife decides to carry on his unfinished dream of making neon signs.

— TIFF

== Plot ==
Middle-aged widow Mei-heung has faced countless sleepless nights since her husband Bill's passing. Upon discovering a key among Bill’s possessions, she is led to his secret neon workshop and meets young apprentice Leo. Together, they embark on a journey to complete Bill's last project, as Mei-heung learns the delicate craft of neon light blowing. Her efforts to recreate a demolished neon sign with her own hands become a poignant homage to their shared past. As Mei-heung reflects on her life with Bill, she uncovers hidden fragments of his history, providing her with a bittersweet solace. Concurrently, her daughter Prism grapples with her own secret plans to leave Hong Kong, struggling to reveal them to her mother. As the mystery of the legendary neon sign unravels, Mei-heung is confronted with truths she had long avoided.

== Cast ==
- Sylvia Chang as Mei-heung
  - Alma Kwok as young Mei-heung
- Simon Yam as Biu
  - Jacky Tong as young Biu
- Cecilia Choi as Rainbow
- Henick Chou as Leo
- Rachel Leung as Victoria

== Production ==
A Light Never Goes Out is the feature debut of Anastasia Tsang, who graduated from Sorbonne University's film department. The film is produced by The Way We Dance's Saville Chan and reunites Sylvia Chang with Simon Yam, with whom she previously worked in the 1982 horror comedy He Lives by Night.

== Controversy ==
A Light Never Goes Out was submitted for consideration in the Best International Feature Film category at the 2024 Oscars. However, the film was later disqualified due to a conflict of interest in the voting process. One of the film's stars, veteran actor Simon Yam, was also a member of the Federation of Motion Film Producers of Hong Kong selection committee that decides which film to submit for the Oscars each year. This violated the Academy's rules stating that selection committee members cannot have a professional relationship with a film under consideration. As a result, the movie was pulled from contention, and Hong Kong ultimately decided not to submit any other film in its place given the large margin by which A Light Never Goes Out had originally won the nomination.

== Critical reception ==
Phuong Le of The Guardian describes A Light Never Goes Out as a "heartfelt love letter" to the diminishing world of Hong Kong’s neon sign artisans. Despite relying on a conventional plot with familiar archetypes, performances by Sylvia Chang and Cecilia Choi elevate the narrative, suggesting profound familial bonds beneath surface-level clichés. The film, Le remarks, embodies a significant cultural undertaking, with the characters’ endeavors to maintain Hong Kong’s cultural identity set against a backdrop of socio-political change. However, Le points out a missed opportunity for the film to incorporate the rich history of its neon sign-making legacy more fully into the story.

In Edmund Lee’s review for the South China Morning Post, Sylvia Chang’s performance is praised as "genuinely riveting." The film is further commended for its poignant portrayal of Hong Kong’s rapidly disappearing neon sign tradition. However, Lee notes that the film's human drama feels laboured next to the evocative tribute to the city's once-prevalent neon landscape.

== Release ==
The film was showcased for its U.S. premiere at the 22nd New York Asian Film Festival in 'Hong Kong Panorama' section on 25 July 2023.

== Awards and nominations ==
Awards	Category	Recipient	Result	Ref.
59th Golden Horse Awards	Best Leading Actress	Sylvia Chang	Won	
59th Golden Horse Awards	Best Visual Effects	Dennis Yeung	Nominated	
59th Golden Horse Awards	FIPRESCI Prize	A Light Never Goes Out	Nominated	
41st Hong Kong Film Awards	Best Actress	Sylvia Chang	Nominated	
41st Hong Kong Film Awards	Best New Performer	Henick Chou	Nominated	

== See also ==
- List of submissions to the 96th Academy Awards for Best International Feature Film
- List of Hong Kong submissions for the Academy Award for Best International Feature Film
