= Carrian Group =

Defunct Hong Kong conglomerate

- Company type: Public
- Founded: 1977
- Founder: George Tan
- Defunct: 1983
- Fate: Bankruptcy
- Headquarters: Hong Kong
- Area served: Australia; Japan; Malaysia; New Zealand; Taiwan; Thailand; United States
- Products: Diversified Investments

Carrian Group was a Hong Kong conglomerate. It collapsed amidst a major corruption and fraud scandal.

== History ==
Carrian was founded in 1977 by George Tan Soon-gin, who fled Singapore following a bankruptcy in 1974.

In 1979, Tan acquired a holding company that became his Carrian Investment Limited (CIL) for HK$700 million. Carrian Holdings Limited (CHL), a private company, controlled 53% of CIL equity, and Carrian Nominee, a company held 100% of CHL shares.

In January 1980, the group, through a 75% owned subsidiary, purchased Gammon House (now Bank of America Tower) in Central District, Hong Kong for HK$998 million. It was then the most expensive real estate transaction in the Hong Kong's history. It grabbed the limelight in April 1980 when it announced the sale of Gammon House for HK$1.68 billion, a high return on investment that surprised Hong Kong's property and financial markets and developed public interest in Carrian.

In the same year, Carrian capitalised on its notoriety by acquiring a publicly listed Hong Kong company, renaming it Carrian Investments Ltd., and using it as a vehicle to raise funds from the financial markets.

The group grew rapidly in the early 1980s to include properties in Malaysia, Thailand, Singapore, Philippines, Japan, and the United States. Its rapid expansion has led to rumors over the source of its capital, with various rumors speculating the capital came from Imelda Marcos, Gosbank, and a lumber corporation in Borneo.

== Downfall ==
Carrian Group became involved in a scandal with Bank Bumiputra Malaysia Berhad of Malaysia and its Hong Kong–based subsidiary Bumiputra Malaysia Finance. Following allegations of accounting fraud, a murder of a bank auditor, and the suicide of the firm's adviser, the Carrian Group collapsed in 1983, the largest bankruptcy in Hong Kong.

The scandal and its ultimate downfall eventually exposed the mystery surrounding the seemingly inexhaustible capital that Carrian had as nothing more than loans from banking institutions.

== Legacy ==
Almost no traces of Carrian Group remain following its collapse. A Hong Kong restaurant that specializes in Teochew cuisine, Carriana, was loosely named after Carrian due to links between one of its former owners, Chim Pui-chung, and Carrian. Carriana is currently a listed company in Hong Kong.

== Operations ==
The company, at various points of its existence, had operations in pesticide, tourism, shipping, insurance, taxi fleets, and restaurants.

However, the company's main business is noted to be in real estate.

== Media portrayal ==
The 2020 TVB drama series Of Greed and Ants (黃金有罪) is based on various aspects of the fraud scandal that Carrian Group was engulfed in.

The 2023 film The Goldfinger (金手指) is based on the events surrounding the company's rise and subsequent fall. Produced and distributed by Emperor Motion Pictures, the film was released on 30 December 2023.

== Bibliography ==
- Vengadesan, Martin; Sagayam, Andrew (2019). Malaysian Murders and Mysteries:A century of shocking cases that gripped the nation. Singapore: Marshall Cavendish Editions. ISBN 978-981-4868-82-2.
- Naylor, R.T. (2004). Hot Money and the Politics of Debt (Third ed.). McGill–Queen's University Press. ISBN 0-7735-2743-5.
- Fung, Bongyin (2017). Cheng, Hoiben; Lau, Yusum (eds.). 香港企業併購經典（增訂版） [Hong Kong Corporate Mergers & Acquisitions Classics (Updated Version)] (in Traditional Chinese) (August 2017 Hong Kong Updated Version, 1st Printing ed.). Hong Kong: Joint Publishing. ISBN 978-962-04-4225-4.
