= King Cheung =

Hong Kong film director

Cheung King-Wai (born 1968) is a Hong Kong film director and screenwriter. He was awarded Best New Director at the 29th Hong Kong Film Awards and named Artist of the Year in 2009 by the Hong Kong Arts Development Council.

== Biography ==
Cheung was born in Hong Kong and grew up in the Tsuen Wan district. He initially attended Hoi Pa Street Government Primary School, later graduating from Buddhist Lam Bing Yim Memorial School, Sheung Kwai Chung Government Industrial Secondary School, and the Music Department of the Hong Kong Academy for Performing Arts. After secondary school, he studied music, film, and philosophy at Brooklyn College, City University of New York, earning a bachelor's degree in film.

Known for his ability to explore social issues from a humanistic perspective, Cheung's works often draw significant public attention. In 2001, his graduation project Farewell Hong Kong, themed around the handover of Hong Kong, was selected for competition at the Sundance Film Festival. In 2005, his script Tin Shui Wai won the HAF Award of Hong Kong Asia Film Financing Forum and was later adapted by director Ann Hui into the film Night and Fog (2009).

In 2008, his feature documentary All's Right With The World was nominated for the Humanitarian Award for Documentaries at the Hong Kong International Film Festival. In 2009, his documentary KJ: Music and Life won Best Documentary, Best Editing, and Best Sound Effects at the 46th Golden Horse Awards, making it the most awarded documentary in Golden Horse history. The film also received four nominations at the 29th Hong Kong Film Awards, including Best Film—marking the first time a documentary was nominated in that category. Cheung himself won Best New Director at the same ceremony and was honored as Artist of the Year by the Hong Kong Arts Development Council.

In 2010, his short narrative film Crimson Jade was nominated for Best Short Film at the 47th Golden Horse Awards and selected for the Clermont-Ferrand International Short Film Festival in France. In 2011, his third documentary feature One Nation, Two Cities was again nominated for the Humanitarian Award for Documentaries at the Hong Kong International Film Festival.

At the end of 2012, he began filming the Macao-based short narrative Hills of Ilha Verde (2015).

In early 2014, production began on his first narrative feature Somewhere Beyond the Mist, produced by Derek Yee. The film was officially released in January 2018. The feature film is based on his 2001 script God's Apple.

In February 2023, musician Wong Ka-ching publicly accused Cheung of breaking a promise by including private family matters in KJ: Music and Life that Wong had explicitly asked not to be shown.
