= Zeno Koo =

Hong Kong actor and singer (born 1994)

- 顧定軒
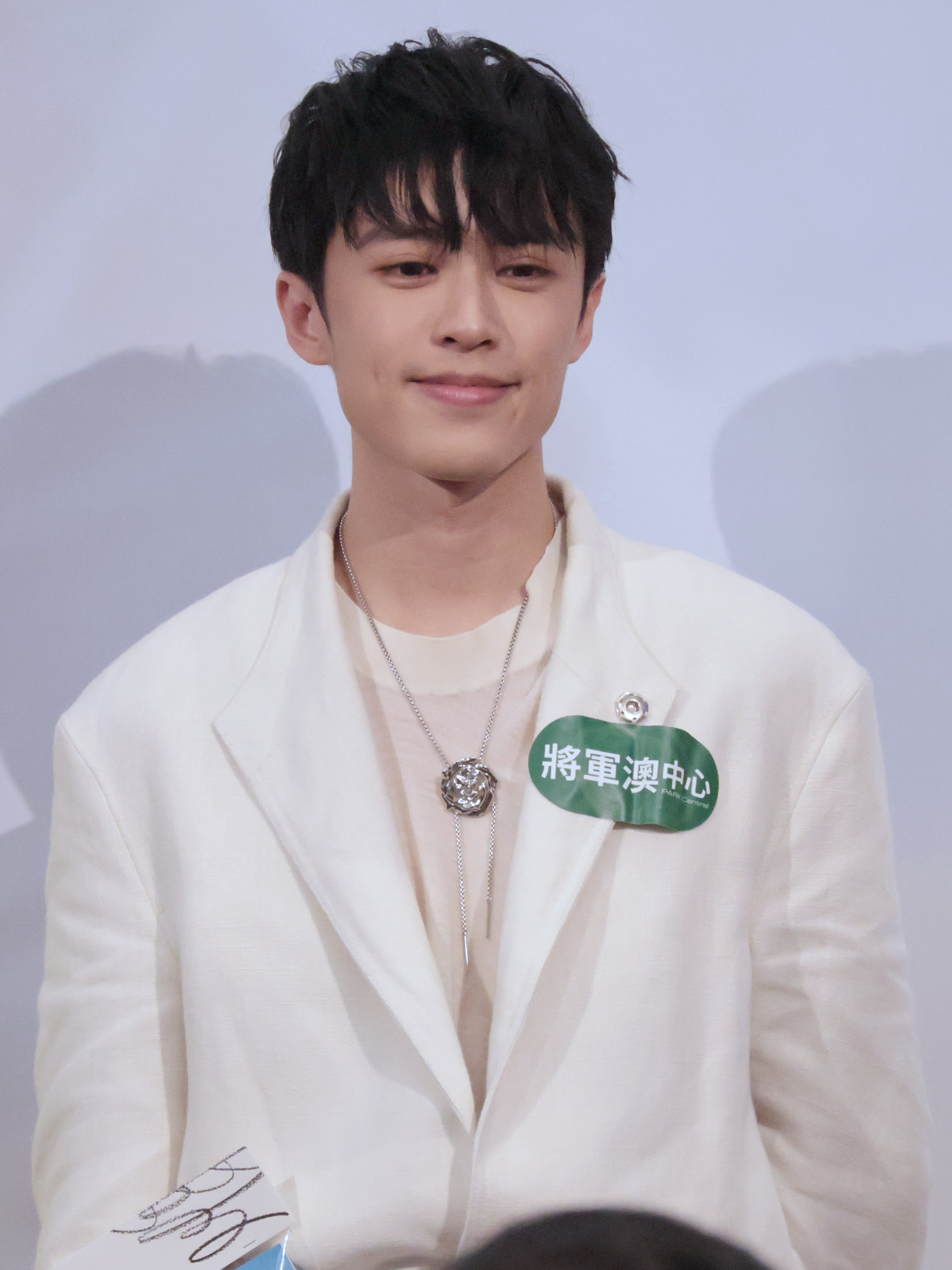
- Koo in March 2024
- Born: Koo Ting-hin; 19 September 1994 (age 32); Hong Kong
- Education: Hong Kong Academy for Performing Arts
- Occupations: Actor; singer
- Years active: 2014–present

Zeno Koo Ting-hin (Chinese: 顧定軒; born 19 September 1994) is a Hong Kong actor and singer best known for his roles as Ben Chu in the TVB romance series Life After Death (2020) and King Cheung in the ViuTV sports series We are the Littles (2021). He has also starred in the films Somewhere Beyond the Mist (2017), Tracey (2018), I'm Livin' It (2020), and Cyber Heist (2023).

== Early life ==
Koo was born on 19 September 1994. His mother died in an accident when he was young, and his father later remarried, orphaning Koo. He was raised solely by his grandmother, and Koo described his childhood as "rebellious" due to his father's actions. Koo studied at Yan Chai Hospital Law Chan Chor Si College, and while in secondary school, he signed with a modeling agency, First Cast, and had appeared on the cover of Yes! Magazine. After graduation, Koo was recommended by his class teacher to enroll in a two-year acting program at the Hong Kong Academy for Performing Arts.

== Career ==
Koo made his acting debut in 2014 with the drama film Enthralled, at the age of 19. He went on to star in several RTHK television series, including Sexpedia. In 2017, he landed his first lead role as a school murder accomplice in the drama film Somewhere Beyond the Mist, and also appeared in the romance film Tracey as a transgender woman in the following year. However, he did not receive any acting roles for the subsequent three years, during which time he worked as a construction worker, customer service representative, and chef to make a living.

In 2020, Koo experienced a breakthrough, landing main roles as Ben Chu in the TVB romance series Life After Death and King Cheung in the ViuTV sports series We are the Littles. While filming the latter, he was invited by his co-stars Leung Yip, Denis Kwok, and Jeremy Lee to join ViuTV's variety show King Maker III, where he proceeded to the round of 20 before being eliminated. Koo also appeared in the anthology film Memories to Choke On, Drinks to Wash Them Down, the drama film I'm Livin' It, and the horror comedy film Hell Bank Presents: Running Ghost that same year. The following year, Koo starred in the black comedy film Time. In 2022, he released his first single "Nessie", and went on to appear in the action thriller film Cyber Heist and the horror film Social Distancing in the following year. In 2024, Koo released his first EP, ZKOOL.

== Filmography ==
=== Film ===
Year	Title	Role	Notes/Ref.
2014	Enthralled	Andrew	
2017	Our Time Will Come	Soldier	
2017	Somewhere Beyond the Mist	Eric	
2018	Tracey	Young Tracey / Travis	
2020	Memories to Choke On, Drinks to Wash Them Down	The Younger Brother	Segment: Toy Stories
2020	I'm Livin' It	Sam Wong (王洛深)	
2020	Hell Bank Presents: Running Ghost	Chung (聰仔)	
2021	Time	Chan Bun (陳賓)	
2023	Cyber Heist	Chan Ming-wai (陳明威)	
2023	Social Distancing	Seven (陳漢霖)	

=== Television ===
Year	Title	Role	Notes/Ref.
2015	Sexpedia	Joe Ng (吳祖堯)	Main role
2017	Margaret & David - Ex	Chi (志仔)	Recurring role
2018	Sign Language	Kam (阿金)	Guest role
2018	Elite Brigade IV	Kiu (喬)	Guest role
2018	Afterlife Firm	Lam Tsz-fung (林子峰)	Guest role
2020	Flying Tiger 2	Fat (發仔)	Guest role
2020	Life After Death	Ben Chu Ka-bing (朱嘉炳)	Main role
2020	We are the Littles	King Cheung King-hong (張競康)	Main role
2023	Killing Procedures	Young Manager (經理)	Guest role
2023	Beyond the Common Ground	Mr. Tse (謝生)	Guest role

=== Variety shows ===
Year	Title	Role	Notes/Ref.
2020	King Maker III	Himself	Contestant

== Discography ==
=== Extended plays ===
Title	Album details	Tracklisting	Ref.
ZKOOL	Released: 19 September 2023; Label: Lazybeast Limited; Formats: CD, digital download and streaming	1. 行動代號0901 (lit: Codename 0901); 2. Y-not-2-OK; 3. 羅曼蒂克！ (lit: Romantic!)	

=== Singles ===
- "Nessie" (尼斯) (2022)
- "XY" (2022)
- "Teach Me" (教我) (2022)

=== Collaborations ===
Year	Title	Album	Artists	Notes/Ref.
2023	"Star War" (星戰)	Ireallylovetosing	Leo Ku & New Generation	
2023	"Slowly" (緩緩)	—N/a	Ah Bo, Miu and Su Feat Zeno Koo	
