= Henick Chou =

Hong Kong actor (born 1995)

- 周漢寧
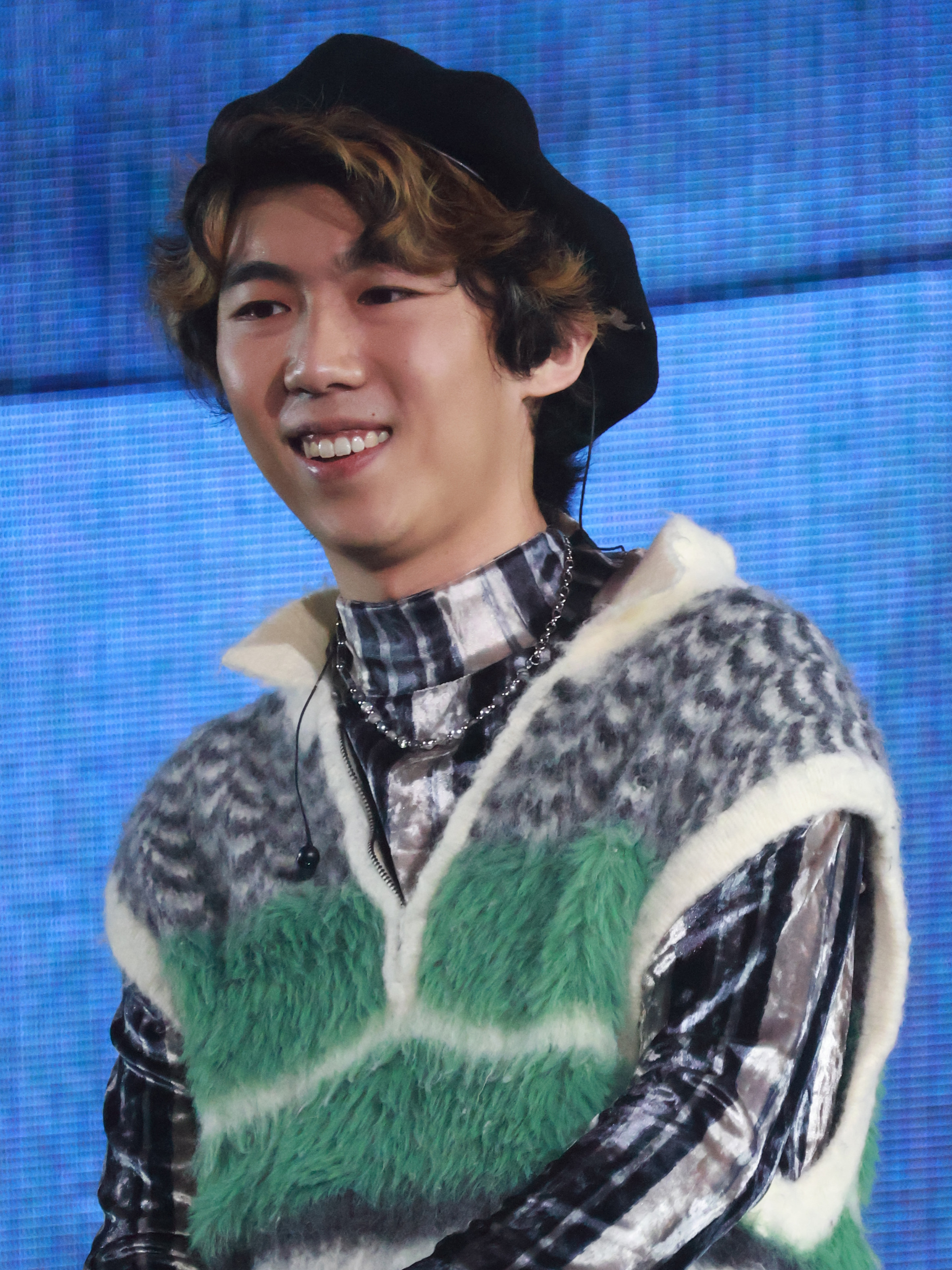
- Chou in June 2023
- Born: Chou Hon-ning; 17 November 1995 (age 30) (Note: According to Oriental Daily News, Chou had his birthday on 17 November 2023 and reached age 28.); Hong Kong
- Education: Hong Kong Academy for Performing Arts (BFA)
- Occupation: Actor
- Years active: 2019–present

Henick Chou Hon-ning (Chinese: 周漢寧; born 17 November 1995) is a Hong Kong actor best known for his debut role in ViuTV drama series Limited Education (2019). He was nominated for Best New Performer in the 41st Hong Kong Film Awards with his performance in the drama film A Light Never Goes Out (2022).

== Early life and education ==
Chou was born on 17 November 1995. When he was 5, he auditioned as the voice ensemble of animated movie McDull, Prince de la Bun. He later attended St Stephen's College and joined numerous singing and acting performances in secondary school. After graduation, he applied for the Hong Kong Academy for Performing Arts under the encouragement of his mother and graduated with a Bachelor of Fine Arts in performing arts in 2018.

== Career ==
In 2019, Chou landed his first major onscreen role as Chong Tzi Man, an elite schoolkid suffering from depression, in ViuTV drama series Limited Education. His performance was widely acclaimed and was voted as Best Supporting Actor by the netizens in an annual internet popularity poll hosted by entertainment journalist Fongeman. However, Chou did not receive any new roles afterwards due to the COVID-19 pandemic. Chou was cast in a lead role alongside Sylvia Chang in the 2022 drama film A Light Never Goes Out as a neon sign workshop apprentice. He was nominated for Best New Performer in the 41st Hong Kong Film Awards. In 2023, Chou portrayed an intellectually disabled resident in a care home who was abused by the nurses and a hearing-impaired student who was bullied at school respectively in the drama films In Broad Daylight and Time Still Turns the Pages.

== Filmography ==
=== Film ===
Year	Title	Role	Notes
2022	Pretty Heart	Tsang Chi Kit (曾志傑)	
2022	A Light Never Goes Out	Leo	
2023	Everyphone Everywhere	Ning (阿寧)	
2023	In Broad Daylight	Ming Chai (明仔)	
2023	Time Still Turns the Pages	Vincent	
2023	Bursting Point	Fishball	
2024	Love at First Lie	Lok (樂少)	
2024	The Lyricist Wannabe	William	
2024	Last Song for You	Young Bing (細炳)	

=== Television ===
Year	Title	Role	Notes
2019	Limited Education	Chong Tzi Man (莊子民)	Main role
2019	Alpha Maria	Lai Yi Hang (賴以恆)	Main role

== Awards and nominations ==
Year	Award	Category	Work	Result	Ref.
2023	41st Hong Kong Film Awards	Best New Performer	A Light Never Goes Out	Nominated	
