= Bank of America Tower (Hong Kong) =

Skyscraper in Hong Kong

Bank of America Tower (1990 – present)
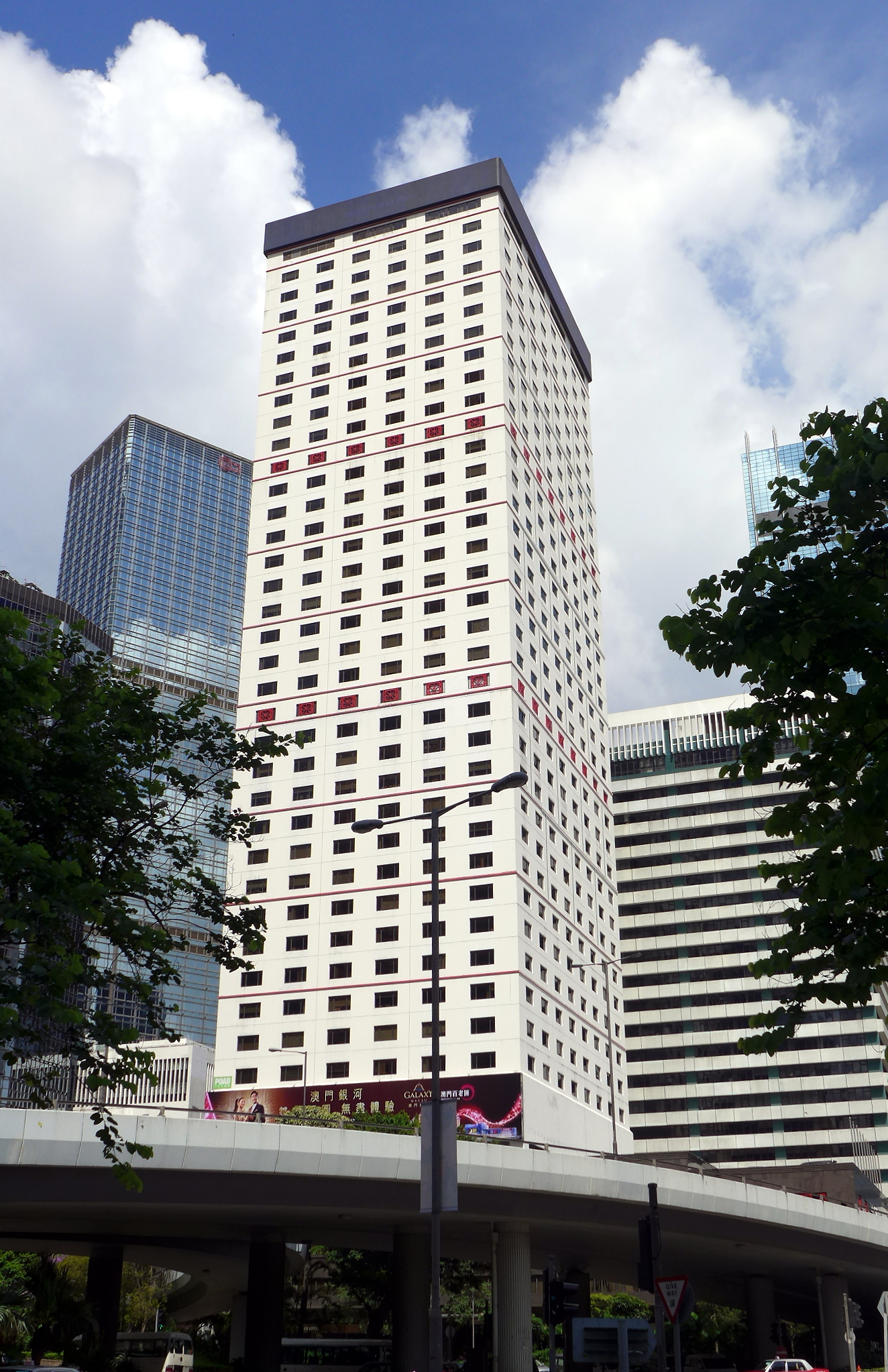
- Bank of America Tower (Hong Kong), 2015
- Interactive map of the Bank of America Tower (1990 – present) area
- Former names: Gammon House (1975–1980), Carrian House (1980–1990)

General information
- Type: Commercial Offices
- Location: 12 Harcourt Road
- Coordinates: 22.2813°N 114.16303°E
- Completed: 1975; 51 years ago

Height
- Roof: 146 m (479 ft)

Technical details
- Floor count: 38

Design and construction
- Architects: Ho & Partners Architects Limited
- Developer: Gammon Construction

The Bank of America Tower is a 38-floor 146 m (479 ft) skyscraper located at 13-15 Harcourt Road in the Admiralty area of Hong Kong Island. The first floor is rented for retail and catering businesses. The third and fourth floors are for car parking, while offices start from the fifth floor up. Each floor provides 13,880 square feet for rent, with the smallest unit starting from 800 square feet.

The Bank of America Tower participates in A Symphony of Lights.

== History ==
In the 1970s, Gammon Construction redeveloped the Victoria Barracks. At the same year, Hongkong Land acquired Gammon Construction. It was completed in 1975.

In the 1980s, HSBC set up a vault on the ground floor of the building before the HSBC Building was completed. In the same year, it was renamed as Carrian House after a HKD$998 million purchase by the Carrian Group. Within two years, the property price plummeted due to political uncertainty, and the purchase was seen as a "fraud," with Carrian Group being liquidated by the court. The case was resolved in the Supreme Court in 1997.

It was sold in layers, and purchased and renamed by Bank of America. In the early 2000s, Bank of America's Hong Kong office moved its operations to Hong Kong International Finance Centre Tower 2 and Kowloon Trade Centre, retaining only the naming rights and external advertising rights of Bank of America.

== See also ==
- List of tallest buildings in Hong Kong
