= In Broad Daylight (2023 film) =

2023 Hong Kong film by Lawrence Kan

- Directed by: Lawrence Kan
- Written by: Lawrence Kan; Tong Chui-ping
- Produced by: Derek Yee
- Starring: Jennifer Yu; David Chiang; Rachel Leung; Bowie Lam
- Cinematography: Meteor Cheung
- Edited by: Lo Wai-lun
- Music by: Wan Pin-chu
- Release date: 11 June 2023
- Running time: 103 minutes
- Country: Hong Kong
- Language: Cantonese

In Broad Daylight (Chinese: 白日之下) is a 2023 Hong Kong crime drama film directed by Lawrence Kan, from a screenplay co-written with Tong Chui-ping. It stars Jennifer Yu as an undercover journalist who investigates the suspected abuse of patients at a local nursing home. The film was inspired by two different nursing home scandals that happened in Hong Kong. In 2015, the Cambridge Nursing Home was exposed for stripping some of their female residents naked and leaving them outside while they were waiting for a shower. A year later, a former director of the Bridge of Rehabilitation care home was found guilty of assaulting a visually-impaired, underage female resident.

The film was released to positive critical reception, with reviewers praising the performances of Yu, Rachel Leung, and Bowie Lam. The movie earned 16 nominations at the 42nd Hong Kong Film Awards.

== Cast ==
- Jennifer Yu as Kay
- David Chiang as Chau Kin-Tong
- Bowie Lam as Cheung Kim-Wah
- Rachel Leung as Wong Siu-Ling
- Henick Chou
- Leung Chung-hang
- Chu Pak Hong
- Chu Pak Him
- Nina Paw
- Vanora Hui
- Bowie Wu
- Peter Chan

== Awards and nominations ==
Award	Date of ceremony	Category	Recipient(s)	Result	Ref.
Hong Kong Film Awards	April 14, 2024	Best Film	In Broad Daylight	Nominated	
Hong Kong Film Awards	April 14, 2024	Best Director	Lawrence Kan	Nominated	
Hong Kong Film Awards	April 14, 2024	Best Screenplay	Lawrence Kan, Li Cheuk-fung, Tong Chui-ping	Nominated	
Hong Kong Film Awards	April 14, 2024	Best Cinematography	Meteor Cheung	Nominated	
Hong Kong Film Awards	April 14, 2024	Best Editing	Lo Wai Lun	Nominated	
Hong Kong Film Awards	April 14, 2024	Best Art Direction	Albert Poon, Kate Tse	Nominated	
Hong Kong Film Awards	April 14, 2024	Best Supporting Actor	David Chiang	Won	
Hong Kong Film Awards	April 14, 2024	Best Supporting Actress	Rachel Leung	Won	
Hong Kong Film Awards	April 14, 2024	Best Actress	Jennifer Yu	Won	
Hong Kong Film Awards	April 14, 2024	Best Sound Design	Chill Yang	Nominated	
Hong Kong Film Awards	April 14, 2024	Best Song	A Touch of Daylight	Nominated	
Asian Film Awards	March 10, 2024	Best Supporting Actress	Rachel Leung	Won	
