= The Goldfinger =

2023 Hong Kong film by Felix Chong

- Theatrical release poster
- Traditional Chinese: 金手指
- Simplified Chinese: 金手指
- Hanyu Pinyin: Jīn Shǒu Zhǐ
- Jyutping: Gam1 Sau2 Zi2
- Directed by: Felix Chong
- Written by: Felix Chong
- Produced by: Ronald Wong
- Starring: Tony Leung; Andy Lau
- Cinematography: Anthony Pun
- Edited by: William Chang; Curran Pang
- Music by: Day Tai
- Production companies: Emperor Motion Pictures; AMTD Digital
- Distributed by: Emperor Motion Pictures
- Release date: 30 December 2023
- Running time: 126 minutes
- Country: Hong Kong
- Language: Cantonese
- Budget: US$45 million
- Box office: US$85 million (Note: See Box office)

The Goldfinger is a 2023 Hong Kong crime drama film written and directed by Felix Chong, starring Tony Leung and Andy Lau. Set in the 1980s, the film is based on the story of Carrian Group, a Hong Kong corporation which rose rapidly before collapsing shortly afterwards due to a corruption scandal.

Budgeted at HK$350 million, production for the film began in February 2021 and wrapped up on 24 May 2021. It was released in Hong Kong and globally on 30 December 2023.

== Plot ==
In 1976, Henry Ching struggles to find engineering work in Hong Kong. He befriends property developer K.K. Tsang, who hails from the same region of China. Tsang recruits Henry to con one of Tsang's wealthy acquaintances, netting the pair HK$1 million. They enter a partnership and make further millions in real estate. Henry establishes the Carmen Century group and expands into other bold ventures. He boosts Carmen Century's stock price through market manipulation, then uses the inflated stock as bribes to secure loans which fund Carmen Century's growth. Henry becomes one of Hong Kong's most celebrated figures in high finance.

In 1982-83, news that Britain and China are negotiating Hong Kong's handover shakes investor confidence and cause a market downturn. Carmen Century's stock collapses as a result. Henry struggles to access further credit to service Carmen Century's enormous debts, spooking his associates.

Carmen Century's meteoric rise and fall attract scrutiny from ICAC investigator Lau Kai-yuen. He has Henry and his associates arrested as his team finds evidence of illegal activity in Carmen Century's books. Lau and his family narrowly escape an assassination attempt. Henry agrees to testify on condition that his associates are released. However, the testimony is useless, and this allows Henry to tie up loose ends by ordering the associates' murder once they leave custody. One associate, K.K.'s son, survives the purge by taking the fall for Henry, and is sentenced to 14 years imprisonment. With the assistance of a corrupt judge, Henry escapes conviction.

In 1988, Henry again stands trial after the FBI arrests his corrupt American banking associates. Again he walks free, after a mistrial is declared following the revelation that the presiding judge's wife had bought Carmen Century's stocks

In 1996, Lau secures an extradition order for Musharra Hafa, a corrupt banker representing the Southeast Asian petrostate "Timurlaysia". With Hafa's testimony and other evidence against Henry, he concedes that the evidence is overwhelming and finally pleads guilty. He is sentenced to three years. Carmen Century is liquidated with major creditors being compensated, but general shareholders receiving nothing. Henry reflects on how he and Lau are both pawns in a game of those much more powerful, and Lau ponders whether the decade-long effort was worth it.

== Cast ==
- Tony Leung Chiu-wai as Henry Ching Yat-yin, based on George Tan
- Andy Lau as Lau Kai-yuen
- Charlene Choi as Carmen Cheung
- Simon Yam as K.K. Tsang
- Michael Ning as Yam Chung, based on Chim Pui-chung
- Alex Fong as Kelvin, Ching's lawyer
- Philip Keung as Musharra Hafa
- Carlos Chan as Ho Ho Wan
- Chin Ka-lok as Sarge
- Tai Po as Wu Rensong
- Anita Yuen as judge
- Catherine Chau as Suen Wei, Lau Kai-yuen's wife
- Renci Yeung as Lau Wing, Lau Kai-yuen's daughter
- Will Or as Ng Chi-fai
- Kaki Sham as Johnny
- Ng Siu-hin as Chim Man-wai
- Lam Yiu-sing as Tse Kin-ming

== Production ==
Production for The Goldfinger began in February 2021, under the English working title Once Upon a Time in Hong Kong. On 20 February 2021, the film held its production commencement press conference at Emperor Cinema located in iSquare in Tsim Sha Tsui where it was attended by Emperor Motion Pictures chairman Albert Yeung, producer Ronald Wong, screenwriter and director Felix Chong, alongside cast members Andy Lau, Tony Leung, Charlene Choi, Simon Yam, Alex Fong, Philip Keung, Chin Ka-lok (who also serves as the film's action director), Carlos Chan and Catherine Chau. According to Yeung, the film is produced at a budget of HK$350 million, a recording-breaking budget for a Hong Kong production, and anticipates the film to break box office records as the highest-grossing Hong Kong film. At the event, Lau revealed he first received from the script producer Wong and after reading it, he believed Leung is the best choice to act as his on-screen opponent. On the other hand, Leung revealed that his and Lau's roles in the film are reversed from their previous collaboration in the Infernal Affairs film series.

Production for The Goldfinger officially wrapped up on 24 May 2021, after filming its climax scene involving Lau and Leung on location in a presidential suite at The Peninsula.

== Release ==
The Goldfinger was theatrically released on 30 December 2023 simultaneously in Hong Kong, Mainland China, Taiwan, Singapore, Malaysia, Australia, New Zealand, United Kingdom, United States and Canada.

== Reception ==
=== Box office ===
In Hong Kong, the film debuted at No. 1 during its opening weekend, grossing HK$9,373,112 during its first two days of release including previews.

The Goldfinger has grossed a total of US$85.6 million worldwide combining its box office totals from Hong Kong (US$5.6 million), China (US$79.7 million), Australia (US$245,443), United Kingdom (US$81,665) and New Zealand ($24,926).

=== Critical reception ===
On the review aggregator website Rotten Tomatoes, 59% of 22 critics' reviews are positive, with an average rating of 5.7/10. Metacritic, which uses a weighted average, assigned the film a score of 47 out of 100, based on 6 critics, indicating "mixed or average" reviews.

== Awards and nominations ==
Year	Award	Category	Nominee	Result	Ref.
2024	30th Hong Kong Film Critics Society Awards	Best Director	Felix Chong	Nominated	
2024	30th Hong Kong Film Critics Society Awards	Best Screenplay	Felix Chong	Nominated	
2024	30th Hong Kong Film Critics Society Awards	Best Actor	Tony Leung Chiu-wai	Nominated	
2024	30th Hong Kong Film Critics Society Awards	Films of Merit	—N/a	Won	
2024	17th Asian Film Awards	Best Actor	Tony Leung Chiu-wai	Nominated	
2024	17th Asian Film Awards	Best Costume Design	Man Lim-chung	Won	
2024	17th Asian Film Awards	Best Production Design	Eric Lam	Won	
2024	Hong Kong Screenwriters' Guild Awards 2023	Best Movie Character of the Year	Tony Leung Chiu-wai	Nominated	
2024	42nd Hong Kong Film Awards	Best Film	The Goldfinger	Nominated	
2024	42nd Hong Kong Film Awards	Best Director	Felix Chong	Nominated	
2024	42nd Hong Kong Film Awards	Best Screenplay	Felix Chong	Nominated	
2024	42nd Hong Kong Film Awards	Best Actor	Tony Leung Chiu-wai	Won	
2024	42nd Hong Kong Film Awards	Best Cinematography	Anthony Pun	Won	
2024	42nd Hong Kong Film Awards	Best Editing	William Chang, Curran Pang	Nominated	
2024	42nd Hong Kong Film Awards	Best Art Direction	Eric Lam	Won	
2024	42nd Hong Kong Film Awards	Best Costume & Make Up Design	Man Lim Chung	Won	
2024	42nd Hong Kong Film Awards	Best Original Film Score	Day Tai	Nominated	
2024	42nd Hong Kong Film Awards	Best Original Film Song	"Let's Get To The Top"	Nominated	
2024	42nd Hong Kong Film Awards	Best Visual Effects	Lik Wong, Benson Poon	Won	
2024	42nd Hong Kong Film Awards	Best Sound Design	Nopawat Likitwong	Won	

== See also ==
- Andy Lau filmography
