= List of Hong Kong films of 2018 =

This article lists feature-length Hong Kong films released in 2018.

== Box office ==
The highest-grossing Hong Kong films released in 2018, by domestic box office gross revenue, are as follows:

Highest-grossing films released in 2018
Rank	Title	Distributor	Domestic gross
1	Project Gutenberg	Distribution Workshop	HK$33,674,849
2	Master Z: Ip Man Legacy	Mandarin Motion Pictures	HK$15,377,690
3	Men on the Dragon	Orange Sky Golden Harvest	HK$9,419,854
4	Golden Job	Intercontinental Film Distributors	HK$8,731,413
5	Big Brother	Orange Sky Golden Harvest	HK$4,970,566

== Releases ==
Title	Director	Cast	Notes
A Beautiful Moment	Patrick Kong	Simon Yam, Michelle Wai, Carina Lau, Ivana Wong, Philip Keung, Bob Lam, Natalie Tong, Alex Fong, Joey Yung, Patrick Tse, MC Jin, Stephy Tang. Nancy Sit, Nina Paw, Harriet Yeung, Louis Yuen, Lo Hoi-pang, Law Lan, Cecilia So, Louisa Mak	In theatres 15 February 2018
Adieu	Kenneth Lau	Louis Cheung, Michelle Wai, Jason Chan, Hedwig Tam, Law Lan, Philip Keung, Halina Tam, Gladys Li	In theatres 6 September 2018
Agent Mr. Chan	Jeff Cheung	Dayo Wong, Charmaine Sheh, Lawrence Cheng, Ronald Cheng, Ada Choi, Cheung Kwok-keung, Larine Tang, Zhao Rong, Sammi Cheng, Cecilia So, Justin Cheung, Michael Ning, Lam Suet, C-Kwan	Released 15 February 2018.
Big Brother	Kam Ka-wai	Donnie Yen, Joe Chen, Yu Kang, Dominic Lam, Alfred Cheung, Bruce Tong, Chris Tong, Gladys Li	In theatres 16 August 2018
Concerto of the Bully	Fung Chih-chiang	Ronald Cheng, Cherry Ngan, Chrissie Chau, Philip Keung, Michael Ning	In theatres 1 March 2018
Golden Job	Chin Ka-lok	Ekin Cheng, Jordan Chan, Michael Tse, Chin Ka-lok, Jerry Lamb, Eric Tsang	In theatres 20 September 2018
Hotel Soul Good	Anthony Yan	Chrissie Chau, Louis Cheung, Eric Kot, Maggie Shiu, Richard Ng	In theatres 18 October 2018
House of the Rising Sons	Anthony Chan	The Wynners, Simon Yam, Kara Hui, Elaine Jin, Carlos Chan, Yu Tian, Jonathan Wong	In theatres 19 July 2018
Iceman II	Law Wing-cheung	Donnie Yen, Simon Yam, Wang Baoqiang	In theatres 15 November 2018
In Your Dreams	Tam Wai-ching	Carina Lau, Ng Siu-hin, Tse Kwan-ho, Stephen Tung	In theatres 11 January 2018
L Storm	David Lam	Louis Koo, Julian Cheung, Kevin Cheng, Stephy Tang, Patrick Tam, Michael Tse	In theatres 23 August 2018
The Leakers	Herman Yau	Francis Ng, Julian Cheung, Charmaine Sheh, Chrissie Chau, Kent Cheng, Wilfred Lau, Sam Lee	In theatres 21 June 2018
The Lingering	Derrick Tao; Mak Ho-pong	Athena Chu, Louis Cheung, Bob Cheung	In theatres 4 October 2018
Love · Revolution	Sam Leong	Natsuna, Hiroshi Shinagawa, Candy Lo, Sam Lee	In theatres 5 December 2018
Lucid Dreams	Teddy Robin	Louis Cheung, Dada Chan, Maria Cordero, Siu Yam-yam, Kevin Cheng, Anika Xia, Stephy Tang, Andrew Lam, Cecilia So	In theatres 25 October 2018
Keyboard Warriors	Sit Ho-ching	Stephy Tang, Grace Chan, Lam Yiu-sing, Neo Yau, Larine Tang	In theatres 1 November 2018
Kung Fu League	Jeffrey Lau	Vincent Zhao, Andy On, Dennis To, Danny Chan Kwok-kwan	In theatres 13 December 2018
Kung Fu Monster	Andrew Lau	Louis Koo, Chen Xuedong, Bao Bei'er	In theatres 27 December 2018
Master Z: The Ip Man Legacy	Yuen Woo-ping	Zhang Jin, Dave Bautista, Michelle Yeoh, Tony Jaa	In theatres 21 December 2018
Men on the Dragon	Sunny Chan	Francis Ng, Poon Chan-leung, Kenny Wong, Tony Wu, Nancy Wu, Jennifer Yu, Thor Lok	In theatres 2 August 2018
No. 1 Chung Ying Street	Sung Kee-chiu	Neo Yau, Fish Liew, Lo Siuyea	In theatres 31 May 2018
Paws Men	Au Cheuk-man	Bob Lam, Charlie On, Au Cheuk-man	In theatres 10 October 2018
Project Gutenberg	Felix Chong	Chow Yun-fat, Aaron Kwok, Zhang Jingchu, Alex Fong, Alien Sun, Catherine Chau	In theatres 4 October 2018
Rhapsody of Kidnapping		Christine Ng, Justin Cheung, Eric Kwok, Jennifer Yu, Alycia Chan	In theatres 18 January 2018
Staycation	Johnson Lee	Ti Lung, Johnson Lee, Andrew Lam, Chin Siu-ho, Yuen Qiu, Louisa So, Law Kar-ying, Liu Wai-hung	In theatres 1 February 2018
Tracey	Jun Li	Philip Keung, Kara Hui, Eric Kot, Ben Yuen, River Huang, Jennifer Yu, Ng Siu-hin	In theatres 15 November 2018
The Trough	Nick Cheung	Nick Cheung, Xu Jinglei, Yu Nan, He Jiong	In theatres 3 May 2018
When Sun Meets Moon	Benny Lau	Kathy Yuen, Daichi Harashima, Aimee Chan, Danny Summer, Mark Lui, Lawrence Cheng, Maggie Shiu	In theatres 31 May 2018
Last Exit to Kai Tak	Matthew Torne		Released

== See also ==
- 2018 in Hong Kong
