= 38th Hong Kong Film Awards =

2019 Hong Kong Film Awards

- Poster
- Date: 14 April 2019
- Site: Hong Kong Cultural Centre
- Hosted by: Stephy Tang and Alex Fong Lik Sun
- Organised by: Hong Kong Film Awards Association

Highlights
- Best Film: Project Gutenberg
- Best Director: Felix Chong; Project Gutenberg
- Best Actor: Anthony Wong Chau-sang; Still Human
- Best Actress: Chloe Maayan; Three Husbands
- Most awards: Project Gutenberg (6)
- Most nominations: Project Gutenberg (17)

Television coverage
- Network: ViuTV

The 38th Hong Kong Film Awards presentation ceremony took place at the Hong Kong Cultural Centre on 14 April 2019.

== Winners and nominees ==
Winners are listed first, highlighted in boldface, and indicated with a double dagger ‡.

**Best Film**: **Ronald Wong — Project Gutenberg** ‡; Fruit Chan, Doris Yang — Three Husbands; Candy Leung — Operation Red Sea; Fruit Chan — Still Human; Joe Ma, Jacqueline Liu — Men On The Dragon	**Best Director**: **Felix Chong — Project Gutenberg** ‡; Fruit Chan — Three Husbands; Dante Lam — Operation Red Sea; Sunny Chan — Men On The Dragon; Oliver Chan — Still Human
**Best Screenplay**: **Felix Chong — Project Gutenberg** ‡; Chan Wai, 33, Ying Liang — A Family Tour; Sunny Chan — Men On The Dragon; Oliver Chan — Still Human; Shu Kei, Erica Li, Jun Li — Tracey	**Best Actor**: **Anthony Wong Chau-sang — Still Human** ‡; Francis Ng — Men On The Dragon; Chow Yun-fat — Project Gutenberg; Aaron Kwok — Project Gutenberg; Philip Keung — Tracey
**Best Actress**: **Chloe Maayan — Three Husbands** ‡; Charlene Choi — The Lady Improper; Jennifer Yu — Distinction; Crisel Consunji — Still Human; Zhang Jingchu — Project Gutenberg	**Best Supporting Actor**: **Ben Yuen — Tracey** ‡; Kenny Wong — Men On The Dragon; Poon Chan Leung — Men On The Dragon; Sam Lee — Still Human; Liu Kai-chi — Project Gutenberg
**Best Supporting Actress**: **Kara Wai — Tracey** ‡; Huang Lu — G Affairs; Jiang Luxia — Operation Red Sea; Jennifer Yu — Men On The Dragon; Catherine Chau — Project Gutenberg	**Best New Performer**: **Crisel Consunji — Still Human** ‡; Lam Sen — G Affairs; Peter Chan — Three Husbands; Nancy Wu — Men On The Dragon; Adam Pak — L Storm
**Best Cinematography**: **Jason Kwan — Project Gutenberg** ‡; Karl Tam Ka Ho — G Affairs; Choi Sung Fai — Detective Dee: The Four Heavenly Kings; Fung Yuen Man, Horace Wong Wing Hang — Operation Red Sea; Anthony Pun — Monster Hunt 2	**Best Film Editing**: **Curran Pang — Project Gutenberg** ‡; Barfuss Hui — G Affairs; Tsui Hark, Li Lin — Detective Dee: The Four Heavenly Kings; Choi Chi Hung, Lam Chi Hang — Operation Red Sea; Stanley Tam, Mary Stephen — Napping Kid
**Best Art Direction**: **Eric Lam — Project Gutenberg** ‡; Cho Hwa Sung — The Monkey King 3; Yoshihito Akatsuka, Raymond Li — Detective Dee: The Four Heavenly Kings; Lee Kin Wai, Guillaume Aretos, Yohei Taneda — Monster Hunt 2; Irving Cheung — Tracey	**Best Costume & Make Up Design**: **Man Lim Chung — Project Gutenberg** ‡; Bruce Yu, Lee Pik Kwan — The Monkey King 3; Bruce Yu, Lee Pik-kwan — Detective Dee: The Four Heavenly Kings; Yee Chung-man — Monster Hunt 2; Irving Cheung — Tracey
**Best Action Choreography**: **Dante Lam — Operation Red Sea** ‡; Lin Feng — Detective Dee: The Four Heavenly Kings; Li Chung Chi — Project Gutenberg; Chin Ka Lok, Alan Ng, Tang Sui Wah — Golden Job; Yuen Shun-yi — Master Z: The Ip Man Legacy	**Best Original Film Score**: **RubberBand — Men On The Dragon** ‡; Teddy Robin Kwan, Eddie Tang — Lucid Dreams; Day Tai — Project Gutenberg; Chan Kwong Wing, Kay Chan — Golden Job; Otomo Yoshihide — Tracey
**Best Original Film Song**: **"Men On The Dragon" — Men On The Dragon** ‡; **Composer: RubberBand**; **Lyrics: RubberBand**; **Performer: RubberBand**; "Sun Shines Bright" — Distinction; Composer: Charles Lau; Lyrics: Saville Chan; Performer: Jennifer Yu; "Let Us Be The One" — Project Gutenberg; Composer: Day Tai; Lyrics: Saville Chan; Performer: Jan Curious; "Together We Charge, Together We March On" — Golden Job; Composer: Chan Kwong Wing; Lyrics: Fiona Fung, Chan Kwong Wing, Jeffrey Chu; Performer: Ekin Cheng, Jordan Chan, Michael Tse, Chin Ka-lok, Jerry Lamb; "Tracey" — Tracey; Composer: Panther Chan; Lyrics: Panther Chan; Performer: Panther Chan	**Best Sound Design**: **Nopawat Likitwong, Sarunyu Nurnsai — Operation Red Sea** ‡; Tu Duu-Chih, Wu Shu-Yao — G Affairs; Steve Burgess — Detective Dee: The Four Heavenly Kings; Lee Yiu Keung George, Yiu Chun Hin — Monster Hunt 2; Dhanarat Dhitirojana, Kaikangwol Rungsakorn, Sarunyu Nurnsai — Project Gutenberg
**Best Visual Effects**: **Inho Lee, Taegyun Kang — Operation Red Sea** ‡; Jay Seung Jaegal, SungJin Jung, Branden Juwon Lee, Eric Xu — The Monkey King 3; Park Young Soo, Chuck Chae, Maegawa Hideaki, Ji Myung Goo — Detective Dee: The Four Heavenly Kings; Ellen Poon — Monster Hunt 2; Lim Hung Fung Alex — Project Gutenberg	**Best New Director**: **Oliver Chan — Still Human** ‡; Lee Cheuk Pan — G Affairs; Sunny Chan — Men On The Dragon; Jeff Cheung — Agent Mr Chan; Jun Li — Tracey
**Best Film from Mainland and Taiwan**: **Dying to Survive** (China) ‡; Ash Is Purest White (China); Last Letter (China); Hidden Man (China); Angels Wear White (China)	**Professional Achievement** **Lau Wan**
**Lifetime Achievement Award** **Patrick Tse**
