= G Affairs =

2018 Hong Kong film by Lee Cheuk-pan

- Theatrical release poster
- Traditional Chinese: G殺
- Literal meaning: G Kill
- Jyutping: G Saat^{3}
- Directed by: Lee Cheuk-pan
- Screenplay by: Kurt Chiang
- Produced by: Herman Yau
- Starring: Hanna Chan; Chapman To; Huang Lu
- Cinematography: Karl Tam
- Edited by: Barfuss Hui
- Production companies: A Scout Pictures; Insight Production
- Distributed by: Distribution Workshop
- Release dates: 16 November 2018 (HKAFF); 14 March 2019 (Hong Kong)
- Running time: 105 minutes
- Country: Hong Kong
- Language: Cantonese
- Budget: HK$5.5 million

G Affairs (Chinese: G殺) (Note: G殺 is a homophone of the Cantonese pronunciation of 自殺 (zi^{6} saat^{3}), which means 'suicide'.) is a 2018 Hong Kong thriller film directed by Lee Cheuk-pan and produced by Herman Yau. Starring Hanna Chan, Chapman To, and Huang Lu, the film centers on a young girl (Chan) who faces bullying at school due to the online exposure of her corrupted cop father (To) and the social status of her prostitute stepmother (Huang).

Conceived by Lee Cheuk-pan in 2012, the film was stuck in development hell due to a lack of investment, as the story was deemed unsuitable for the Chinese market. After Kurt Chiang came on board as the writer and completely rewrote the screenplay in 2016, the film was selected for the First Feature Film Initiative. Pre-production lasted for a year, with filming commencing in December 2017 and wrapping up in February 2018.

The film premiered on 16 November 2018 at the 15th Hong Kong Asian Film Festival, and was theatrically released in Hong Kong on 14 March 2019. It received six nominations in the 38th Hong Kong Film Awards and was named Film of Merit in the 25th Hong Kong Film Critics Society Awards.

== Plot ==
Yu Ting, a schoolgirl often ridiculed for her small breasts, is nicknamed "G" (as a sarcastic reference to her bra size) by her classmates. In a conversation with her only friend, Don, an autistic boy who also feels outcast, she expresses her disdain for the letter G, which Don assumes relates to gastric cancer, the illness that claims her mother's life. Meanwhile, a corrupt policeman named Lung threatens Tai, his neighbour and a classmate of Yu Ting who is secretly in love with her, demanding he vacate his home or face false drug possession charges.

Lung was previously filmed using excessive violence while confronting an old hawker on the streets. The video spreads online, causing public outrage and bringing personal details about Lung to light, which leads him to seek a hideout and Yu Ting is revealed to be his daughter on internet forums. This results in Yu Ting being called to meet the principal and her class teacher Markus, alongside her stepmother Xiao Mei, a prostitute with whom she has a troubled relationship. The principal expresses disgust at Xiao Mei's profession and instead blames Yu Ting for tarnishing the school's reputation. In secret, Yu Ting and Markus develop a sexual relationship shortly after her mother's death. Markus becomes mesmerized by Yu Ting's skills to the point where he cannot concentrate in class. Yu Ting's classmates, having discovered her mother's past, bully her with mocking comments. She soon learns that her stepmother is also known online for her sexual exploits.

After moving in Lung's house, Xiao Mei begins visiting Tai. Their casual chats evolve into deeper conversations, with Tai often playing the cello for her. When Tai visits an abandoned warehouse to feed a stray dog named Gustav, he is followed by classmates who disapprove of his defense of Yu Ting online. As they attack him, Don shouts "guts", reviving Tai's spirit and helping him fight back. Tai notices a steady stream of visitors to Lung's home, including corrupt cops, criminals, and politicians, transforming it into a hub of illegal activity. Lung regularly engages with prostitutes, which disgusts Tai, who plays his cello to drown out the noise. One day, Lung challenges Tai, suggesting he perform for an audience instead of hiding away. Lung employs a hacker, who turns out to be Don, and they discover footage of Xiao Mei with Markus from her brothel's surveillance cameras. Don shows Yu Ting the video, leading her to realize she has contracted gonorrhea from Markus. Enraged, she severs ties with him.

Overwhelmed by societal prejudice against her profession, Xiao Mei commits suicide by jumping off a building, and her head was decapitated while falling onto Tai's balcony. Lung, fearing exposure, attempts to manipulate Don into disposing of the body, but Don sees through Lung's tactics and rebuffs him. Lung then tries to flee the city, but he crashes his car near his home, dying in Yu Ting's arms when she stumbles upon the scene. Nevertheless, Don later collects the body and moves it to Gustav's warehouse.

At last, Tai plays his favourite suite, No. 1 in G Major, for Yu Ting one last time. Together, they confirm their bond and leap off the building together.

== Cast ==
- Hanna Chan as Yu Ting, a cynical top student at a prestigious high school who is bullied by her classmates
- Chapman To as Lung, Yu Ting's father and a corrupt cop
- Huang Lu as Xiao Mei, Yu Ting's stepmother and a prostitute
- Kyle Li as Don, Yu Ting's autistic close friend
- Alan Luk as Markus, Yu Ting's class teacher who develops a sexual relationship with her
- Jeffrey Lam as Tai, an aspiring cellist and bullying victim
- Griselda Yeung as Yu Ting's mother, a sensible but terminally ill education consultant

== Production ==
=== Development ===
Director Lee Cheuk-pan conceived the screenplay for G Affairs in 2012, shortly after returning to Hong Kong from Beijing to pursue a filmmaking career. Originally set in mainland China, the story faced difficulties when Lee presented the project at the Bucheon International Fantastic Film Festival Project Market and Golden Horse Film Project Promotion, struggling to secure investors due to being labeled "unmarketable". The project also encountered hurdles with location shooting in China and was stuck in development hell. Lee later met Kurt Chiang, who joined the project as the writer and completely rewrote the screenplay, transforming it into a school-themed mystery based in Hong Kong. The revised screenplay was completed in 2016, and Lee presented it at the Hong Kong - Asia Film Financing Forum that same year, but it was still rejected by investors as there was deemed to be no market in mainland China. Chiang remarked that the list of G words in the chapter titles were already established in this draft. Lee later befriended filmmaker Tin Kai-man, a co-founder of the First Feature Film Initiative, who invited him to apply the funding initiative just a week before the deadline. The project was enlisted as part of the third wave of the initiative and received startup funding of HK$5.5 million. Pre-production took approximately a year, with casting occurring in May 2017. Three new actors, namely Hanna Chan, Kyle Li, and Jeffrey Lam, were selected through auditions. The film was publicly announced in February 2018, with Chapman To, Huang Lu, Alan Luk, and Griselda Yeung revealed as the main cast, and Herman Yau as the producer. To joined the project at Yau's invitation, accepting reduced remuneration, and announced in interviews that he will stop acting in movies, with G Affairs being his final film role. An official trailer was released in November 2018.

=== Filming ===
Principal photography began in December 2017. Location shooting occurred in Causeway Bay on 24 January 2018, where Chapman To was spotted on set. Tai's apartment, a recurring location in the film, was shot at a tong lau on Percival Street, Causeway Bay. Lee Cheuk-pan stated that he envisioned the story taking place in a tong lau from the outset, as he found it to be the most representative of Hong Kong, and he deliberately set both the first and final shots of the film inside the building. Filming was completed in February 2018.

=== Title ===
Director Lee Cheuk-pan explained that the film is titled "G" Affairs to symbolize a connection throughout the movie. The production crew identified eighteen words starting with "G", including "Guts", "G cup", "Gun", "Girdle", "Gastric cancer", "Giving head", "Gonorrhea", "Goon", "G Major", and "Gustav Klimt", each of which relates to specific plot points. Lee also mentioned that he chose the letter "G" as a shorthand for "HKG" (the country code of Hong Kong), reflecting the film's theme centered on Hong Kong and wanting to represent the city through this abbreviation. HK01 also suggested that the "G" words represent all the main characters in the film: Yu Ting as "Girl", Don as "Geek", Markus as "Grown-ups", Lung as "Government", Tai as "Gentleman", Yu Ting's mother as "Genuine", and Xiao Mei as "G" (a Cantonese slang term for prostitute).

== Release ==
G Affairs premiered at the 15th Hong Kong Asian Film Festival on 16 November 2018, and was presented at the 2018 Golden Horse Film Festival and in the Hong Kong Panorama section of the 18th New York Asian Film Festival. The film was theatrically released in Hong Kong on 14 March 2019.

== Reception ==
Richard Kuipers of Variety described G Affairs as "a striking, metaphor-heavy excursion to contemporary Hong Kong" that, through its experimental storytelling and cohesive use of the letter "G", offers a vivid exploration of corruption and ethical decline in Hong Kong, while remaining hopeful with its beautifully composed final shot. Elizabeth Kerr of The Hollywood Reporter considered the film a vivid but bleak debut by Lee Cheuk-pan, examining the corrupt and morally decaying society of Hong Kong, and found it engaging overall despite its convoluted storytelling and grim characters, particularly praising the performances, especially that of Chapman To.

Edmund Lee of South China Morning Post gave the film 3.5/5 stars, considering it more as a collection of ideas and critiques presented with art-house flair than as a cohesive story, but still regarded it as a stylistically impressive effort that captures the frustrations of Hong Kong's youth in the wake of the Umbrella Movement and deserves recognition for its departure from traditional cinema. Lee also ranked the film fifth out of the 37 Hong Kong films theatrically released in 2019. Fionnuala Halligan of Screen Daily lauded the film's cinematography and strong performances, and although she critiqued its intricate structure and distracting reliance on the letter "G", she nonetheless found that it presents a brutal tale of corruption and depravity that offered an encouraging glimpse into the future of Hong Kong cinema. V.N. Pryor of Cinapse called the film a deeply depraved yet cleverly crafted thriller that presented "a dark, borderline misanthropic view of humanity", exploring the sordid complexities of the people in Hong Kong, through the strong performances particularly from Chapman To and Huang Lu, along with skillfully woven narrative threads, making it a challenging but rewarding cinematic experience.

Sek Kei, writing for The Stand News, offered a rather negative review, labeling the film as an ambitious yet chaotic black comedy that, despite its creative blending of genres and moments of brilliance and humour, is hindered by a disjointed narrative and illogical plot, leading to an incomplete and overly gimmicky project that ultimately feels "out of control". However, Ben Lam, reviewing for Hong Kong Inmedia, expressed an opposite view, calling the film "almost flawless" and complimenting its skillful blend of local themes with Japanese cinematic characteristics, addressing pressing social issues through a complex narrative structure and compelling performances, ultimately leaving a profound impact on viewers regarding generational and political tensions in Hong Kong. Emilie Choi of Ming Pao also praised the film as "bold and innovative", critiquing societal structures through fragmented storytelling and complex character dynamics, and presenting the struggles and resilience of youth in a chaotic adult world.

Hong Kong Film Critics Society described the film as a powerful expression of the anger and frustration of Hong Kong's youth towards society and its moral facades in the post-Umbrella Movement era.

== Awards and nominations ==
Year	Award	Category	Nominee	Result	Ref.
2019	25th Hong Kong Film Critics Society Awards	Best Film	—N/a	Nominated	
2019	25th Hong Kong Film Critics Society Awards	Best Director	Lee Cheuk-pan	Nominated	
2019	25th Hong Kong Film Critics Society Awards	Best Actress	Hanna Chan	Nominated	
2019	25th Hong Kong Film Critics Society Awards	Best Actress	Huang Lu	Nominated	
2019	25th Hong Kong Film Critics Society Awards	Film of Merit	—N/a	Won	
2019	38th Hong Kong Film Awards	Best Supporting Actress	Huang Lu	Nominated	
2019	38th Hong Kong Film Awards	Best New Performer	Jeffrey Lam	Nominated	
2019	38th Hong Kong Film Awards	Best Cinematography	Karl Tam	Nominated	
2019	38th Hong Kong Film Awards	Best Editing	Barfuss Hui	Nominated	
2019	38th Hong Kong Film Awards	Best Sound Design	Tu Duu-chih, Wu Shu-yao	Nominated	
2019	38th Hong Kong Film Awards	Best New Director	Lee Cheuk-pan	Nominated	
