= Three Husbands =

Three Husbands may refer to:

- Three Husbands (1951 film), an American comedy film
- Three Husbands (2018 film), a Hong Kong film
