= Yuen Tai-yung =

Chinese artist (born 1941)

Yuen Tai-Yung
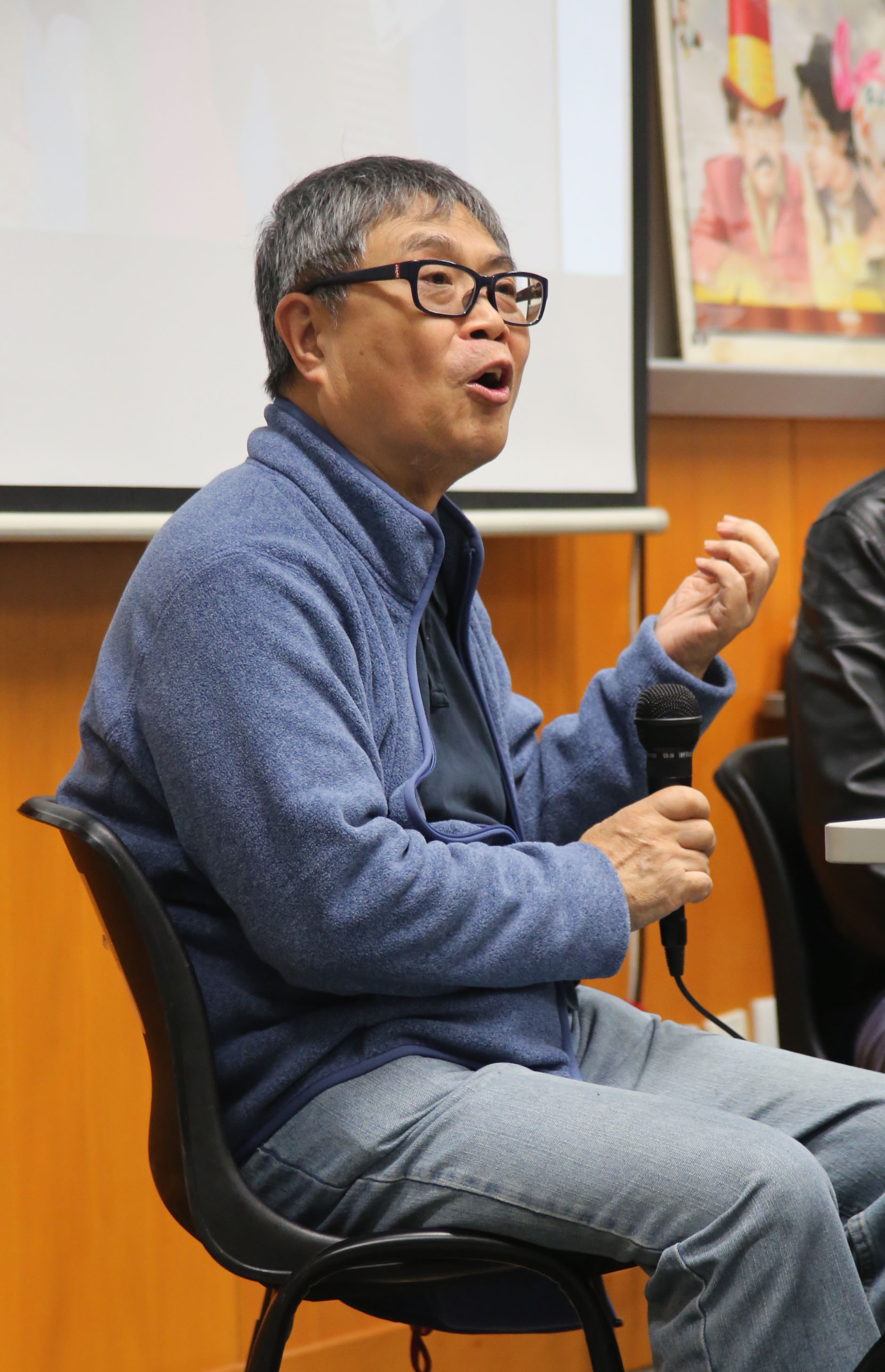
- Yuen in 2015
- Born: 1941 (age 84–85); Zhejiang, China
- Known for: Film posters
- Awards: 2017 Hong Kong Film Award for Professional Achievement

Yuen Tai-yung (Chinese: 阮大勇; pinyin: Ruǎn Dàyǒng; born 1941) is a Chinese artist best known for his Hong Kong movie posters. Dubbed "The Godfather of Hong Kong Movie Posters", he produced over 200 posters from the 1970s to 1990s that include notable films of Bruce Lee, the Hui Brothers, Karl Maka, Stephen Chow, Jackie Chan and Sammo Hung. His other works include advertisements, comic magazine covers, portraits, sketches, and satirical comics.

== Life and career ==
Yuen was born in 1941 in Zhejiang and raised in Shanghai. In 1957 during his teens, he moved to Hong Kong and started work in factories. Around 1965, he worked at the advertising company as an illustrator, a skill that he had to self-teach.

In 1975, Yuen was commissioned by the Hui brothers to create a movie poster for their second film, The Last Message (1975). After completing the job, he received another request to design a similar poster for The Private Eyes (1976). When The Private Eyes became a record-breaking box office success, Yuen found himself in high demand, and was able to establish himself as the go-to poster artist by local Hong Kong film studios.

In 1992, Yuen retired and moved to New Zealand. After his wife died in 2007, he returned to Hong Kong and resumed sketching and showcasing his works at art exhibit.

== Awards ==
- 2017 Hong Kong Film Award for Professional Achievement
