= Miya Muqi =

Chinese actress {1987-2026)

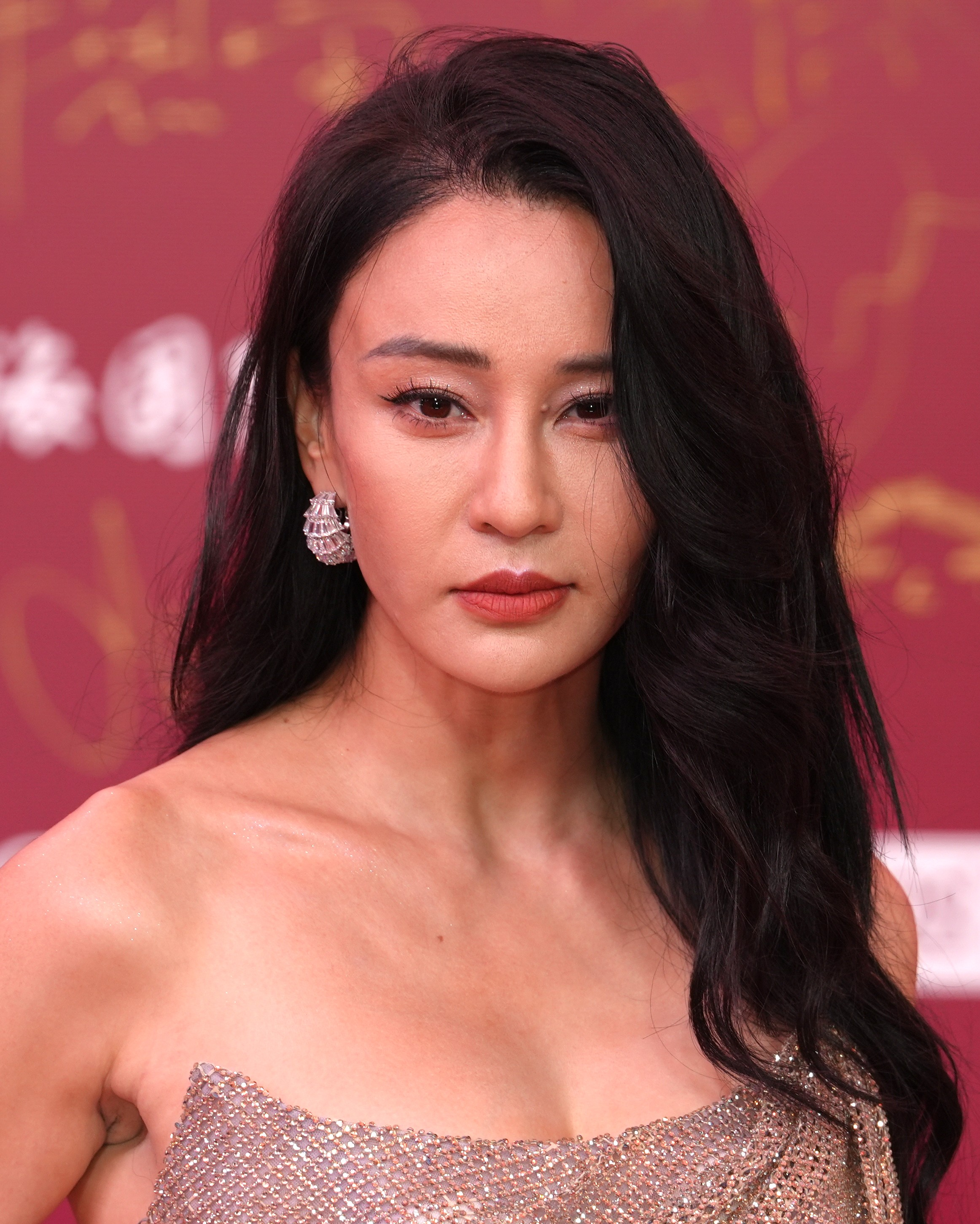
- Miya at the 2026 Shanghai International Film Festival
- Born: Mu Qimiya; 20 May 1987 (age 39); Chuxiong Yi Autonomous Prefecture, Yunnan, China
- Occupations: Actress; professional yoga instructor

Chinese name
- Traditional Chinese: 母其彌雅
- Simplified Chinese: 母其弥雅
Transcriptions
Standard Mandarin
- Hanyu Pinyin: Mǔqí Mǐyǎ

Miya Muqi (Chinese: 母其弥雅; pinyin: Mǔqí Mǐyǎ; born 20 May 1987), professional name for Mu Qimiya, is a Chinese actress who has appeared in films such as Kung Fu Yoga (2017), Tomb Robber (2014) and The Monkey King 2 (2016).

== Biography ==
Born in 1987 in Chuxiong Yi Autonomous Prefecture, Yunnan Province, to a Yi mother and Han Chinese father, Miya Muqi began modeling at the age of 14 years and is a professional yoga instructor. She began her acting career in Tomb Robber, which starred Michael Tong. She was praised as "the most beautiful Asian yoga coach". Miya won the award for "Favorite Lady" at the Tencent automobile exhibition Auto Show 2010.

In addition to being a yoga and dance instructor she is also a teacher of taekwondo. Along with Jackie Chan and other cast members of Kung Fu Yoga, Miya appeared on The Kapil Sharma Show to promote the movie.

== Yoga promotion ambassador ==
Miya Muqi, known as Goddess of Yoga in Yunnan Province, was granted the position of promotional brand ambassador of yoga for 2016 China (Kunming)–India Yoga Conference.

== Filmography ==
=== Films ===
Year	English title	Chinese title	Role	Notes
2014	Tomb Robber	密道追踪之阴兵虎符	Yan Er	
2016	The Monkey King 2	西游记之孙悟空三打白骨精	Pig monster	
2017	Kung Fu Yoga	功夫瑜伽	Noumin	
2018	The Pluto Moment	冥王星时刻	Gao Li	
2018	The Unity of Heroes 2	黄飞鸿之怒海雄风	Kawashima Yukiki	
2020	Vanguard	急先锋	Mi Ya	
2021	Ladki: Dragon Girl	Hindi	Mi Ya	

=== Television ===
Year	English title	Chinese title	Role	Notes
2017	Legend of Heavenly Tear Phoenix Warriors	天泪传奇之凤凰无双	Ji Rousang	
2018	Daredevil Treasure Hunter	绝地勘宝师	Su Setao	

=== Variety show ===
Year	English title	Chinese title	Role	Notes/Ref.
2017	Trump Card	王牌对王牌	Herself	
2020	Super Penguin League; Season:3	超级企鹅联盟super3	Manager; Live Basketball Competition	
