= Hong Kong Film Award for Professional Achievement =

Annual Chinese film award

Hong Kong Film Awards Professional Achievement Award
- Awarded for: Professional achievements for cinema of Hong Kong
- Country: Hong Kong
- Presented by: Hong Kong Film Awards
- First award: 1990

The Professional Achievement Award (Chinese: 專業精神獎) is a special Hong Kong Film Award presented to recipients who have contributed greatly to the Hong Kong cinema both behind or on camera.

== Recipients ==
Year	Recipient	Ref.
1990 (9th)	Yat-Hung Chu	
1991 (10th)	Peng Yen-Lien	
1992 (11th)	To Mui-Hing; Barry Wong	
1994 (13th)	Kong Cho-Toi; Si To-On	
1998 (17th)	Chor Yuen	
2001 (20th)	Yuen Woo-ping	
2003 (22nd)	Tso Tat Wah; Shek Kin	
2004 (23rd)	Richard Lam; Blacky Ko	
2005 (24th)	Jackie Chan; Yu Mo Wan	
2006 (25th)	Charles Wang	
2007 (26th)	Man Yun Ling	
2008 (27th)	Lydia Sum	
2009 (28th)	Ding Yue	
2010 (29th)	Chow Lam	
2011 (30th)	Willie Chan	
2012 (31st)	Fong Ho-Yuen	
2013 (32nd)	Lui Lai-wah; Ko Tin-chow	
2015 (34th)	Lee Kwan Lung	
2016 (35th)	Chow Wing Kwong	
2017 (36th)	Yuen Tai-yung	
2018 (37th)	Pauline Yeung Yung-lin	
2019 (38th)	Lau Wan	
2022 (40th)	Tony Chow Kwok-chung	
2023 (41st)	Law Kar; Sek Kei	
2024 (42nd)	Tong Ping	
2025 (43rd)	Jiang Xiaoliang; Han Dongqing	
2026 (44th)	Yiu Man-kei	
