= Tomb Robber =

- Directed by: Yu Dao
- Production companies: Yunwen（Beijing）Pictures Co., Ltd; Hebei Film and TV Production Center; Chengde Feifan Entertainment Co., Ltd; Beijing Post-Digital Movie Culture Co., Ltd; Beijing Shengli Chuanqi Entertainment Co., Ltd; The Ministry of Public Security Shield Entertainment Center; Youth Film Studio
- Release date: December 5, 2014
- Running time: 95 minutes
- Country: China
- Language: Mandarin
- Box office: ¥5.04 million (China)

Tomb Robber (Chinese: 密道追踪之阴兵虎符) is a 2014 Chinese action adventure suspense thriller film directed by Yu Dao. It was released on December 5, 2014.

== Cast ==
- Michael Tong
- Miya Muqi
- Li Bingyuan
- Li Tao
- Guo Da
- Zhang Shan

== Reception ==
=== Box office ===
By December 8, 2014, the film had earned ¥5.04 million at the Chinese box office.
