= Ladki: Dragon Girl =

- Theatrical release poster
- Directed by: Ram Gopal Varma
- Screenplay by: Ram Gopal Varma
- Story by: Ram Gopal Varma
- Produced by: Ram Gopal Varma; Jing Liu; T Naresh Kumar; T Sridhar Kumar
- Starring: Pooja Bhalekar; Miya Muqi; Rajpal Yadav; Abhimanyu Singh
- Cinematography: V. Malhar Bhatt Joshi
- Edited by: Kamal Ramadugu
- Music by: Paul Praveen Kumar
- Production company: Artsee Media Production
- Release date: 15 July 2022
- Running time: 133 minutes
- Country: India
- Language: Hindi

Ladki: Dragon Girl alternatively titled (Enter the Girl Dragon) is a 2022 Indian Hindi-language martial-arts film written and directed by Ram Gopal Varma, and Jing Liu under an Indo-Chinese production. The film stars Pooja Bhalekar (in her film debut), Miya Muqi, Rajpal Yadav, and Abhimanyu Singh in pivotal roles. Costumes were designed by Shreya Banerjee. It was simultaneously dubbed and released in Hindi, Telugu, Tamil, Kannada, and Malayalam languages in the maximum number of theaters for an Indian film.

== Plot ==
Pooja self trains in Jeet Kune Do, Bruce Lee's fighting technique. In a restaurant, Pooja with the help of Neil, a photographer, beats up a group of men for misbehaving with women.

Pooja explains to Neil that Pooja's sister was raped and that her sister committed suicide. Going through her sister's death at an young age, Pooja starts learning to fight to defend herself by watching Bruce Lee's movies.

Pooja visits a Martial Arts School named Dragon school run by master John. John accepts Pooja as a student after testing Pooja's skills by letting Pooja fight with another student named Chan. Pooja and Neil grew close to each other. Pooja starts to train in dragon school and also works as a model. Pooja participates in a tournament and wins against Musharaff. Attracted to Pooja's beauty and skills, Musharaff joins Dragon School and trains with Pooja. Neil proposes to Pooja on Neil's birthday and Pooja accepts Neil's love proposal. Outside a movie theater, Neil is attacked by a group of men. Pooja and Chan fend off the attackers. Chan confirms the attackers as Musharaff's friends and John expels Musharaff from the Dragon School.

On Pooja's birthday, Neil takes Pooja to Foshan, Bruce Lee's ancestral home. Swami visits Dragon School on behalf of BM builders who wish to buy the Dragon School property. John refuses to sell the Dragon School property to BM builders. John's brother Su accommodates Pooja and Neil. Pooja and Minya, Su's daughter train together. Neil presents a wedding ring to Pooja and Pooja agrees to marry Neil. As John is not willing to sell the Dragon School property, Swami sends a group of men to kill John. After John's death, BM builders become the owner of the Dragon School Property by forging the documents and shuts down the school. Pooja and Neil argue over Pooja's decision to avenge John's death. Group of men attack Pooja and Neil in a beach. Pooja fends off the attackers and Neil agrees to stand with Pooja's decision.

With Musharaff's help, Pooja kidnaps Swami and Swami explains everything to Pooja. Musharaff, Chan and Pooja infiltrate a building and try to capture one of BM's thugs named Kaali. Kaali kills Musharaff and escapes. BM kidnaps Neil and Pooja arrives to rescue Neil. Pooja starts to fight BM's thugs and BM kills Neil. Pooja fights and kills Kaali and BM.

== Premise ==
Inspired by the Enter the Dragon, the film follows an Indian woman's journey to learn kung fu after witnessing her elder sister being sexually assaulted and murdered.

== Cast ==
- Pooja Bhalekar as Puja
- Miya Muqi
- Rajpal Yadav
- Prateek Parmar
- Tianlong Shi
- Malhottra Shivam
- Abhimanyu Singh

== Soundtrack ==
The music for the film is composed by Paul Praveen Kumar.
