= The Pluto Moment =

- Film poster
- Directed by: Ming Zhang
- Starring: Wang Xuebing; Liu Dan; Zeng Meihuizi; Miya Muqi
- Release date: 16 May 2018 (Cannes)
- Running time: 110 minutes
- Country: China
- Language: Mandarin

The Pluto Moment (Chinese: 冥王星时刻 (Ming wang xing shi ke)) is a 2018 Chinese drama film directed by Ming Zhang. It was selected to screen in the Directors' Fortnight section at the 2018 Cannes Film Festival.

== Cast ==
- Miya Muqi as Gao Li
- Wang Xuebing as Wang Zhun
- Zeng Meihuizi as Chun Tai
- Liu Dan as Ding Hongmin
