= Kung Fu Yoga =

2017 film by Stanley Tong

- Theatrical release poster
- Chinese: 功夫瑜伽
- Literal meaning: Kung Fu Yoga
- Hanyu Pinyin: gōngfū yújiā
- Directed by: Stanley Tong
- Written by: Stanley Tong
- Produced by: Jackie Chan; Jianhong Qi; Jonathan Shen; Barbie Tung; Wei Wang
- Starring: Jackie Chan; Aarif Rahman; Lay Zhang; Disha Patani; Miya Muqi; Sonu Sood
- Cinematography: Wing-Hung Wong
- Edited by: Chi-Leung Kwong
- Music by: Nathan Wang
- Production companies: Sparkle Roll Media; Shanghai Taihe Picture; Shinework Pictures; Taihe Entertainment; Sparkle Roll Culture & Entertainment Development; Top Entertainment
- Distributed by: Khorgos Taihe Digital Entertainment Cultural Development; Sparkle Roll Media; Well Go USA Entertainment (United States & International); Star Cinema (Philippines)
- Release dates: January 26, 2017 (Brunei, Taiwan); January 28, 2017 (China)
- Running time: 107 minutes
- Countries: China; India (Note: There are conflicting reports regarding the film's production countries. Some sources refer to the film as a Chinese-only production following India's Viacom 18 dropping out, while others continue to refer it as a Chinese-Indian co-production. Sino-Cinema labels it as a Chinese-Indian co-production due to India's Top Entertainment remains one of the film's co-production partners.)
- Languages: Mandarin; English; Hindi
- Budget: US$65 million
- Box office: US$257.8 million

Kung Fu Yoga (Chinese: 功夫瑜伽) is a 2017 action adventure comedy film written and directed by Stanley Tong and produced by and starring Jackie Chan. Originally planned as a sequel to The Myth (2005), with Chan reprising his role as archaeologist Jack, A Legend (2024) has since been branded as a direct standalone sequel to that film.

The film was released in China on 28 January 2017. It features original music composed by Nathan Wang and an ending dance number choreographed by Farah Khan.

It is Jackie Chan's highest-grossing film in China. It was also the highest-grossing comedy film in China, until it was overtaken by Never Say Die (2017).

== Plot ==
Jack is a renowned archaeology professor at the Terracotta Warriors Museum in Xi'an, who teams up with young Indian professor Ashmita from the National Museum Institute in Rajasthan to locate India's lost Magadha treasure in Tibet. Their team (Jones Lee, Xiaoguang, Kyra, and Noumin) finds the treasure underneath a frozen lake using modern technology, but they are interrupted by a group of mercenaries led by Randall, who steals the treasure and leaves them there to die. In the chaos, Jones, who is more a treasure hunter than an archaeologist, smuggles away a diamond artifact. Jack's and Ashmita's team manages to escape from the underground icy cavern through an opening.

Two weeks later, the 212-carat diamond artifact pops up in Dubai for auction on the black market. To save his job, Jack attempts to get back the artifact with the help of a rich friend. Jack wins the auction, but Randall strikes again with his goons which results in a high-speed car chase through in Dubai. In the ensuing chase, Ashmita snatches it from them. Jack investigates Ashmita's whereabouts and finds she is not who she claimed to be before, but the youngest descendant of Magadha royalty. Ashmita explains the diamond artifact is known as the "Eye of Shiva" in their family chronicles and is the key to immense treasure hidden somewhere. Ashmita asks Jack to help her find the real treasure and protect it from the wrong hands.

They further find the diamond artifact is part of a scepter that opens a map room built using vastu shastra and astronomical positions of that period in a closed part of a sacred temple. Randall kidnaps Jack and Ashmita, where he demands to find the treasure for him because it belonged to his family. They all together find the map room which happens to be a puzzle room where a wrong move can cost lives. They reach an underground Shiva temple made out of gold that is near a secluded waterfall. Reaching there, Randall's group begins to extract gems and diamonds from the temple decorations and searches for the treasure, but they find that the legendary treasure provides ancient knowledge about medicine, Buddhism, mechanical structures and many more.

In despair, Randall tries to destroy everything, but Jack, Ashmita and their team fight to stop them. Jack uses principles of yoga and kung fu to defeat Randall and convinces him of the significant importance of this finding. During this, a group of Sannyasis arrive through the new opening above ground, where they see the magnificence of the deity, Shiva in the underground temple and start to sing and dance in joy. The groups that were fighting realize their pettiness and happily join in the joyous expression.

== Cast ==
- Jackie Chan as Jack
- Aarif Rahman as Jones Lee
- Lay Zhang as Xiaoguang
- Disha Patani as Ashmita
- Miya Muqi as Noumin
- Sonu Sood as Randall
- Amyra Dastur as Kyra
- Muh Bahtiar C as Thyar
- David Torok
- Wen Jiang
- Eric Tsang as Jianhua
- Zhang Guoli as Jonathan
- Shang Yuxian
- Eskindir Tesfay
- Moeed Rehman as Oxan
- Godaan Kumar
- Paul Philip Clark
- Yuxian Shang
- Jiang Wen
- Gao Ming as Museum Curator
- Lavlin Thadani as Professor Ashmita
- Kevin Lee as a hitman

== Production ==
Principal photography began in Beijing in September 2015, before moving to Xi'an and Dubai on 27 September and ended on 30 October. Filming then continued in Beijing and India in December. Filming also took place in Iceland.

The film originally began as a Sino-Indian co-production. However, its Indian production partner Viacom 18 eventually pulled out of the production. Viacom 18 stated: "We had every intent to collaborate with ‘Kung Fu Yoga.’ However things didn't work out as planned. But we are optimistic about more such partnerships in the future."

The film was produced primarily by the Chinese studios Taihe Entertainment and Shinework Pictures, while other production companies include Sparkle Roll Media and Sparkle Roll Culture & Entertainment Development, as well as India's Top Entertainment.

According to director Stanley Tong, Bollywood star Aamir Khan was initially offered a major role in the film, but he could not take up the offer due to scheduling conflicts, as he was busy shooting for his own film, the blockbuster Dangal (2016). The ending dance number in Kung Fu Yoga was choreographed by Bollywood musical dance choreographer Farah Khan.

== Music ==
Kung Fu Yoga

Soundtrack album
- Recorded: 2016
- Genre: Feature film soundtrack
- Length: 10:18
- Languages: Mandarin, English, Hindi

Nathan Wang composed the background score. The soundtrack was released on 2017.

No.	Title	Singer(s)	Length
1.	"Beautiful Fairy Tales"	Jackie Chan, M.I.C	3:36
2.	"Curry Flavor"	Jackie Chan, Zhang Yishan, Yang Zi	3:12
3.	"Money Home"	Manihong	3:30
4.	"Goosebump (Ending song)"	Fazilpuria	2:56
Total length:			10:18

== Release ==
Kung Fu Yoga was released in China on 28 January 2017. It was released in the Philippines by Star Cinema (replacing Viva International Pictures as distributor) on 1 February 2017. In India, the film was released by Tanweer Films on 3 February 2017.

== Reception ==
=== Box office ===
The film was a major box-office success in China, where it became Jackie Chan's highest-grossing film in China and one of the top ten highest-grossing films of all time, grossing ¥1.753 billion (US$254,531,595). In comparison, it was a commercial failure in India, where it grossed ₹40 million (US$614,235.52) on its opening day. The film opened at number 1 in Singapore, earning $1.85 million, during its weekend debut of 28 January 2017.

=== Critical response ===
On Rotten Tomatoes, the film received a score of 48%, based on 23 critics' reviews. On Metacritic, the film received a weighted average score of 50 out of 100, based on 9 critics, indicating "mixed or average reviews".
