= Crisel Consunji =

Filipina-Hong Kong actress

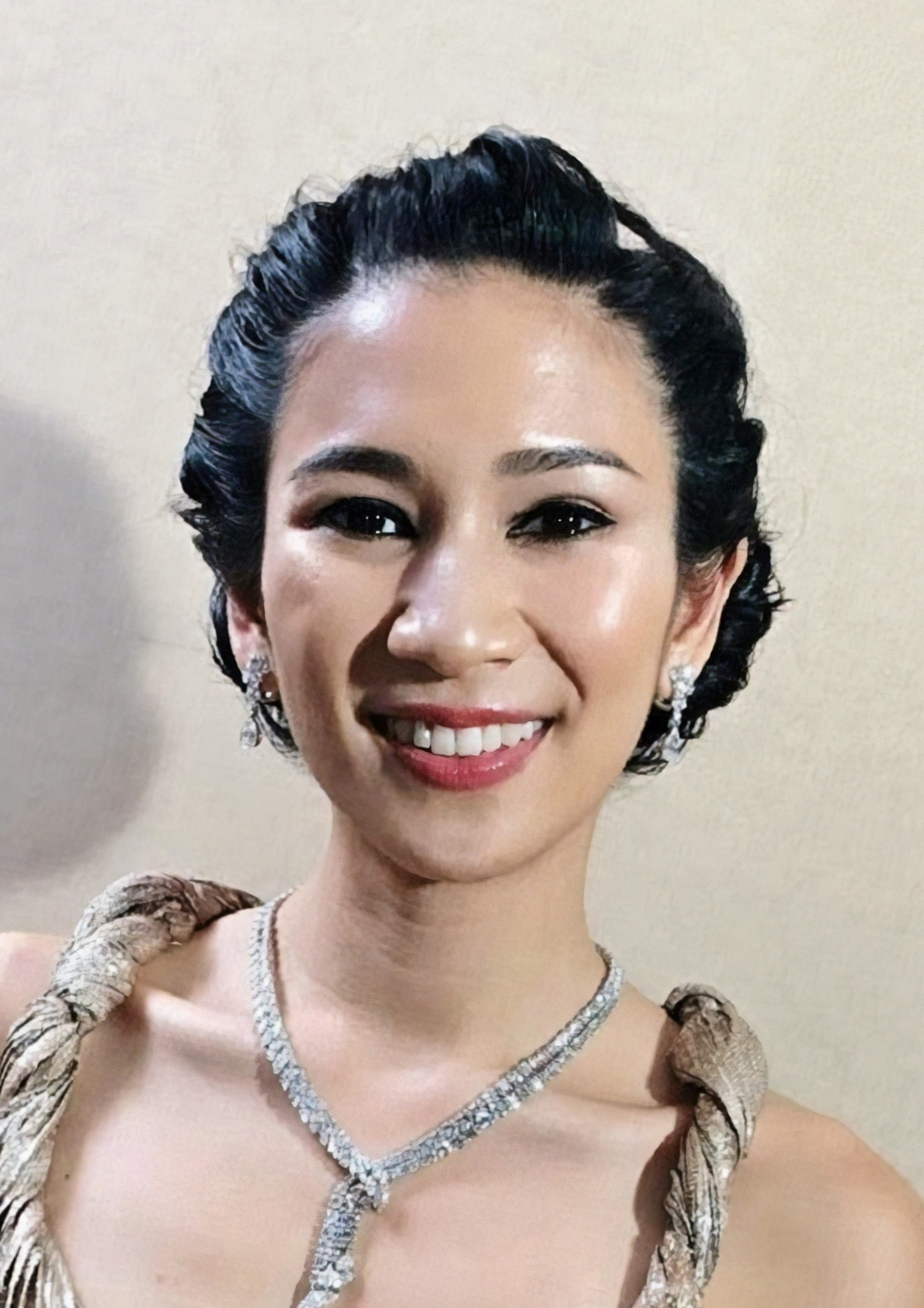
- Consunji at the 38th Hong Kong Film Awards in 2019
- Born: Maria Criselda Ramos Consunji; September 2, 1984 (age 42); Manila, Philippines
- Education: St. Paul College, Pasig; Ateneo de Manila University
- Occupation: Actress
- Years active: 2006—present
- Spouse: Carsten Rakutt (m. 2018)
- Children: 3

Crisel Consunji (Chinese: 姬素·孔尚治, born September 2, 1984) is a Filipina-Hong Kong actress, singer, and educator. In 2019 she won Best New Performer and was nominated for Best Actress at the 38th Hong Kong Film Awards for her role in Still Human.

== Biography ==
Consunji was born and raised in the Philippines. She received a BA and an MA in political science from the Ateneo de Manila University. She was trained at Repertory Philippines, a theatre company, starting there at ten years old.

She moved to Hong Kong in 2008 to work at Hong Kong Disneyland, where she performed for three years as a lead vocalist in productions such as High School Musical and The Golden Mickeys. In 2015, she and her husband Carsten Rakutt founded Baumhaus, which provides creative arts classes to 0–6 year-olds.

== Acting career ==
In 2017, she appeared in an episode of RTHK's series Below the Lion Rock. In 2019 in Still Human, her first starring role, Evelyn Santos, she became the first Filipino to be nominated for and to win Best New Performer, and the first to be nominated for Best Actress at the Hong Kong Film Awards.

== Acting credits ==
=== Film ===
Year	English title	Original title	Role	Notes
2019	Still Human	淪落人	Evelyn Santos	

=== Television series ===
Year	English title	Original title	Role	Notes
2017	Lion Rock Down 2017	獅子山下2017	Anna	

== Stage credits ==
Year	Title	Role	Location	Notes
2007	Into the Woods	Little Red Riding Hood	Manila (New Voice Company)	
2007	Cinderella Kids	Anastasia	Manila (Repertory Philippines)	
2006	Aladdin Jr.	Jasmine	Manila (Repertory Philippines)	
2006	Aspects of Love		Manila (New Voice Company)	
2005	The Magic Flute		Manila (Philippine Opera Company)	
2005	The Emperor's New Clothes	Verity	Manila (Repertory Philippines)	
2004	Pinocchio	The Blue Fairy	Manila (Repertory Philippines)	
2004	Fame	Serena	Manila (Repertory Philippines)	
2003	Beauty and the Beast	Beauty	Manila (Repertory Philippines)	
2002	The Lion, the Witch and the Wardrobe	Susan	Manila (Trumpets)	
2002	Snow White and the Seven Dwarfs	Snow White	Manila (Repertory Philippines)	
2001	Cinderella	Cinderella	Manila (Repertory Philippines)	
2000	Jack and the Beanstalk	The Golden Goose	Manila (Repertory Philippines)	
2000	The Boy Friend	Nancy	Manila (Repertory Philippines)	
1999	Sleeping Beauty	Sybil	Manila (Repertory Philippines)	
1999	Hansel and Gretel	Ensemble	Manila (Philippine Opera Company)	
1998	Annie	Duffy	Manila (Repertory Philippines)	
1998	The Wizard of Oz	Dorothy	Manila (Repertory Philippines)	
1997	Alice in Wonderland	Alice	Manila (Repertory Philippines)	
1996	Pinocchio		Manila (Repertory Philippines)	
1995	Evita		Manila (Repertory Philippines)	
1995	Annabelle Broom, The Unhappy Witch	Judy	Manila (Repertory Philippines)	

== Awards and nominations ==
Year	Award	Category	Nominated work	Result
2019	38th Hong Kong Film Awards	Best Actress	Still Human	Nominated
2019	38th Hong Kong Film Awards	Best New Performer	Still Human	Won
2019	30th Hong Kong Directors' Guild Awards	Best New Actress	Still Human	Won
2019	25th Hong Kong Film Critics Society Award	Best Actress	Still Human	Nominated
