= Chloe Maayan =

Chinese actress

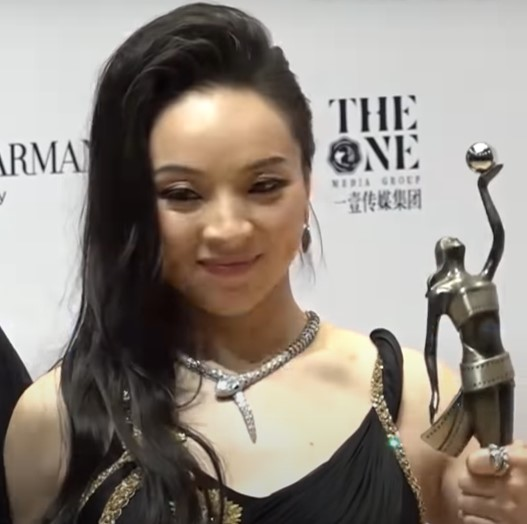
- Zeng at a press conference on 14 April 2019, after the 38th Hong Kong Film Awards.
- Born: Zeng Youmei (曾尤美); October 3, 1988 (age 37); Guiyang, Guizhou, China
- Education: Communication University of China, New York University Tisch School of the Arts
- Occupations: Actress; director
- Years active: 2006–present

Chinese name
- Traditional Chinese: 曾美慧孜
- Simplified Chinese: 曾美慧孜
Transcriptions
Standard Mandarin
- Hanyu Pinyin: Zēng Měihuìzī

Vietnamese name
- Vietnamese: Tằng Mỹ Huệ Tư
- Musical career
- Also known as: Zeng Meihuizi, Zeng Youmei, Zeng Xiaoling

Chloe Maayan (Chinese: 曾美慧孜; Pinyin: Zēng Měihuìzī; born October 3, 1988, as Zeng Youmei (曾尤美)), also known as Zeng Meihuizi, is a Chinese actress and director. She was nominated at the 55th Golden Horse Award for Best Leading Actress, won the 38th Hong Kong Film Awards and the 25th Hong Kong Film Critics Society Awards for Best Actress for her role in Three Husbands.

== Filmography ==
=== Film ===
| Year | English title | Original title | Role | Notes/Ref. |
|---|---|---|---|---|
| 2005 | Summer Palace | 颐和园 | Dongdong | |
| 2007 | A Big Potato | 别拿自己不当干部 | Zhao Xiaoling | |
| 2007 | Lost in Beijing | 苹果 | Xiao Mei | |
| 2009 | Gasp | 气喘吁吁 | Housemaid Ma | |
| 2016 | Songs of the Youth 1969 | 记得少年那首歌 | | |
| 2017 | Bitter Flowers | 下海 | Dandan | |
| 2017 | The Tokyo Vampire | 东京血族 | Liangzi | |
| 2018 | The Pluto Moment | 冥王星时刻 | Chun Tai | |
| 2018 | Three Husbands | 三夫 | Mui | |
| 2018 | Long Day's Journey into Night | 地球最后的夜晚 | Pager | |
| 2018 | Impermanence | 云水 | Lin Meimei | |
| 2019 | The Wild Goose Lake | 南方车站的聚会 | Ping Ping | |
| 2021 | Moneyboys | 寻找 | Lulu | |
| 2022 | The Fallen Bridge | 断·桥 | Gan Xiaoyang | |
| 2023 | Only the River Flows | 河边的错误 | Bai Jie | |
| 2025 | Resurrection | 狂野时代 | Serving Girl | |
| TBA | Shanghai Orphan | 久别重逢 | | |
| TBA | 1999 | 汉语普通话 | | |

=== Short film ===
| Year | English title | Original title | Role | Notes |
|---|---|---|---|---|
| 2013 | Blue & Purple | | Mei Mei | Director & writer |
| 2014 | Last Supper | 最后的晚餐 | Lisa | |

=== Television series ===
| Year | English title | Original title | Role | Notes |
|---|---|---|---|---|
| 2010 | Cell Phone | 手机 | Niu Caiyun | |
| 2013 | Hot Mom! | 辣妈正传 | Fairy | |
| 2023 | Blossoms Shanghai | 繁花 | Min Min | |

== Awards and nominations ==
| Year | Award | Category | Nominated work | Result |
|---|---|---|---|---|
| 2018 | 55th Golden Horse Awards | Best Leading Actress | Three Husbands | Nominated |
| 2019 | 25th Hong Kong Film Critics Society Awards | Best Actress | Three Husbands | Won |
| 2019 | 30th Hong Kong Directors' Guild Awards | Best Actress | Three Husbands | Won |
| 2019 | 13th Asian Film Awards | Best Actress | Three Husbands | Nominated |
| 2019 | 38th Hong Kong Film Awards | Best Actress | Three Husbands | Won |
| 2019 | 9th Youth Film Handbook Awards | Best Actress | Three Husbands | Nominated |
| 2019 | 17th Hong Kong Screenwriters' Guild Awards | Best Actress | Three Husbands | Won |
| 2019 | 21st Asian Film Critics Association Awards | Best Actress | Three Husbands | Nominated |
| 2019 | 10th China Film Director's Guild Awards | Best Actress | The Pluto Moment | Nominated |
| 2019 | 19th Chinese Film Media Awards | Best Supporting Actress | The Pluto Moment | Won |
