= Project Gutenberg (film) =

2018 Hong Kong-Chinese film by Felix Chong

- Theatrical release poster

Chinese name
- Traditional Chinese: 無雙
- Simplified Chinese: 无双
- Literal meaning: Without Equal
Transcriptions
Standard Mandarin
- Hanyu Pinyin: wúshuāng
Yue: Cantonese
- Jyutping: Mou4 Seong1
- Directed by: Felix Chong
- Written by: Felix Chong
- Produced by: Ronald Wong
- Starring: Chow Yun-fat; Aaron Kwok
- Cinematography: Jason Kwan
- Edited by: Curran Pang
- Music by: Day Tai
- Production companies: Pop Movies; Emperor Motion Pictures; Shanghai Bona Media; Shanghai Alibaba Pictures; Huace Film Distribution; Bona Film Group; Pearl River Pictures; Beijing National Shadow Film Publishing; Bona Entertainment Company; A Really Happy Film (Beijing)
- Distributed by: Distribution Workshop (Hong Kong, Worldwide); Emperor Motion Pictures (Hong Kong, Asia); A Really Happy Film (Hong Kong)
- Release dates: 30 September 2018 (China); 4 October 2018 (Hong Kong)
- Running time: 130 minutes
- Countries: Hong Kong; China
- Languages: Cantonese; Mandarin
- Budget: HK$300 million (US$38.3 million)
- Box office: US$188.1 million

Project Gutenberg (Chinese: 無雙; also released as The Counterfeiter in the United Kingdom) is a 2018 crime thriller film written and directed by Felix Chong, starring Chow Yun-fat and Aaron Kwok. A Hong Kong–Chinese co-production, the film was theatrically released on 30 September 2018 in China and on 4 October 2018 in Hong Kong.

== Plot ==
Counterfeit artist Lee Man is extradited to Hong Kong from Thailand. The Hong Kong Police Force led by Inspector Ho are investigating a series of murders and robberies involving counterfeit notes linked to Lee, masterminded by a mysterious figure known only as "Painter". The interrogations are interrupted by renowned artist Yuen Man attempting to bail Lee. An agreement is reached where Lee will be released into witness protection for revealing Painter's identity and criminal history, so Lee begins recounting his past.

In the 1990s, Lee and Yuen were lovers living together in Vancouver, struggling to sell their artwork. Yuen's artistic talent was eventually recognized, but Lee's artwork was criticized for only imitating the styles of great masters. Lee realized his skills and reluctantly became a forger to make a living.

Lee's work was eventually noticed by Painter, who invites Lee to join his team. Lee agreed to leave Canada with the goal of returning and winning over Yuen. Lee successfully worked with the team to overcome the security features of the new 1996 US 100-dollar bill, but became disturbed by Painter's increasingly violent actions, especially after an armored car robbery for paint where Painter kills all the guards out of rage when one ambushes him.

With their counterfeit stock, Painter's team traveled to Thailand to re-negotiate their contract with a warlord known as "the General." Painter revealed that he was actually here for revenge, knowing that the General was responsible for the death of Painter's father, and an attack was launched. During the destruction of the compound, Lee rescued Sau-ching, the General's accountant. Sau-ching joined Painter's team after recovering from her injuries, and Painter gave her a fake passport with the name "Yuen Man." At this time, Lee learned that Yuen had become a successful artist, but also that she was engaged to her agent.

Painter discovered that their next counterfeit buyer was an undercover from the Canadian police. Painter ordered Lee to kill him during the deal, but Lee hesitated and Painter was forced to kill the buyer in the ensuing struggle. Frustrated with Lee's cowardice, Painter revealed a captured and blindfolded Yuen with her agent in the next room. Painter insisted if Lee really wants Yuen back in his life, he should prove it by killing her fiancé. When Lee refused, Painter shot the agent himself, causing Lee to turn on him. Almost everybody was killed in the gunfight that follows, with the Painter nowhere to be found afterwards. Lee and Sau-ching escaped to Lee's new home in Thailand, knowing the Painter would definitely seek retribution. Lee was eventually arrested by the Thai police for counterfeiting, and would notice Painter in a crowd, realizing he was set up for the crimes.

In the present day, Lee and Yuen are escorted to a hotel. Inspector Ho notices a policeman matching Lee's drawn depiction of Painter. He is captured and interrogated, but the confused policeman insists he is a legitimate officer who drove Lee Man to the police headquarters. At this point, the authorities realize they were deceived all along.

It is revealed that while Lee's recount is mostly accurate, the "Painter" character is none other than Lee himself. The real Yuen Man is currently in China, while the Yuen Man in Hong Kong is actually Sau-ching, who received cosmetic surgery to look like Yuen following the burns she received. Sau-ching had feelings for Lee, but Lee was only using her as a replica for Yuen Man. Sau-ching would later kill Yuen Man's fiancé and report him to Thai authorities. While in prison, Lee wrote to Sau-ching for forgiveness and assistance to escape. Lee and Sau-ching kill their guards and escape Hong Kong by boat.

The next day, Sau-ching reveals to Lee that she has been deliberately sailing in circles and they are still in Hong Kong. As the police surround them, she declares she is tired of living as Yuen Man's replacement, and detonates a cache of explosives on the boat.

Inspector Ho visits Yuen Man in China to inform her of Painter's death, but Yuen indifferently says it will not bring back her fiancé. Asked if she recognizes Lee's photograph, Yuen states that he was a neighbor; it seems Lee's relationship with Yuen was also fabricated, and his obsession with her was no more than the unrequited love of a stranger.

== Cast ==
- Chow Yun-fat as Ng Fuk-sang (吳復生) / Painter (畫家) / HKP driver Ng Chi-fai (吳志輝)
- Aaron Kwok as Lee Man (李問)
- Zhang Jingchu as Yuen Man (阮文)
- Joyce Feng as Ng Sau-ching (吳秀清)
- Liu Kai-chi as Ng Yam (吳鑫), Painter's assistant
- Catherine Chau as Inspector Ho Wai-lam (何尉藍)
- David Wang as Royal Canadian Mounted Police Officer Lee Wing-chit (李永哲), Inspector Ho's lover
- Alien Sun as Lam Lai-wah (林麗華), a member of Painter's team
- Deon Cheung as Bobby Wong (王波), a member of Painter's team
- Justin Cheung as Shum Sei-hoi (沈四海), a member of Painter's team
- Carl Ng as Lok Man (駱先生), Yuen Man's agent and fiancé
- Alex Fong as HKP Deputy Commissioner Ho (何副處長), Inspector Ho's father (guest appearance)
- Jack Kao as General (將軍) (guest appearance)
- Xing Jiadong as General's secretary (guest appearance)
- Leung Kin-ping as Lam Tin-lik, Inspector Ho's subordinate.
- Felix Lok as YT
- Dominic Lam as painting shop owner
- Chan Mong-wah as Law Sam
- Javier Hernández and Diego España

== Production ==
Production for Project Gutenberg began in Hong Kong on 15 May 2017 where a blessing ceremony was held. On 18 May 2017, which was also lead actor Chow Yun-fat's 62nd birthday, filming took place at Shing Fung Film Studio in Ho Chung, Sai Kung District. Aside from Hong Kong, shooting also took place in Vancouver, Canada and Thailand.

Director Felix Chong revealed that because the story revolves around a counterfeit organisation and would involve the process of printing counterfeit bills, the script originally contained eight steps describing the printing process, but was later increased to twenty steps to bring more excitement for audiences. Chong also obtained a 7-ton real currency press that cost HK$100,000 and was able to create realistic looking counterfeit currency, which had to be reported to the Monetary Authority. Alan Mak, a frequent collaborator of Chong, served as the film's art director.

== Release ==
Distribution Workshop handled the local Hong Kong distribution and international distribution rights for Project Gutenberg. Emperor Motion Pictures co-distributed the film in Hong Kong as well as handling its distribution rights across Asia, while A Really Happy Film also co-distributed in Hong Kong. The film has been licensed to GSC Movies for theatrical distribution in Malaysia, Shaw Renters and Mm2 Entertainment for theatrical distribution in Singapore and Celestial Tiger Entertainment for pay-TV in Singapore, Malaysia, Indonesia and Brunei. In addition, the film will also license to other territories at the 2017 Cannes Film Festival.

On 17 May 2018, the film released its first teaser trailer, displaying a slated release date of 30 September 2018. On 22 August 2018, a second trailer was released, with a new release date of 4 October 2018.

=== Promotion ===
On 27 August 2018, a press conference of the film was held in the form of an currency distribution ceremony held in the Former Central Police Station in Hong Kong attended by the cast and crew members, where $5000 Hong Kong currency props were showcased.

== Awards and nominations ==
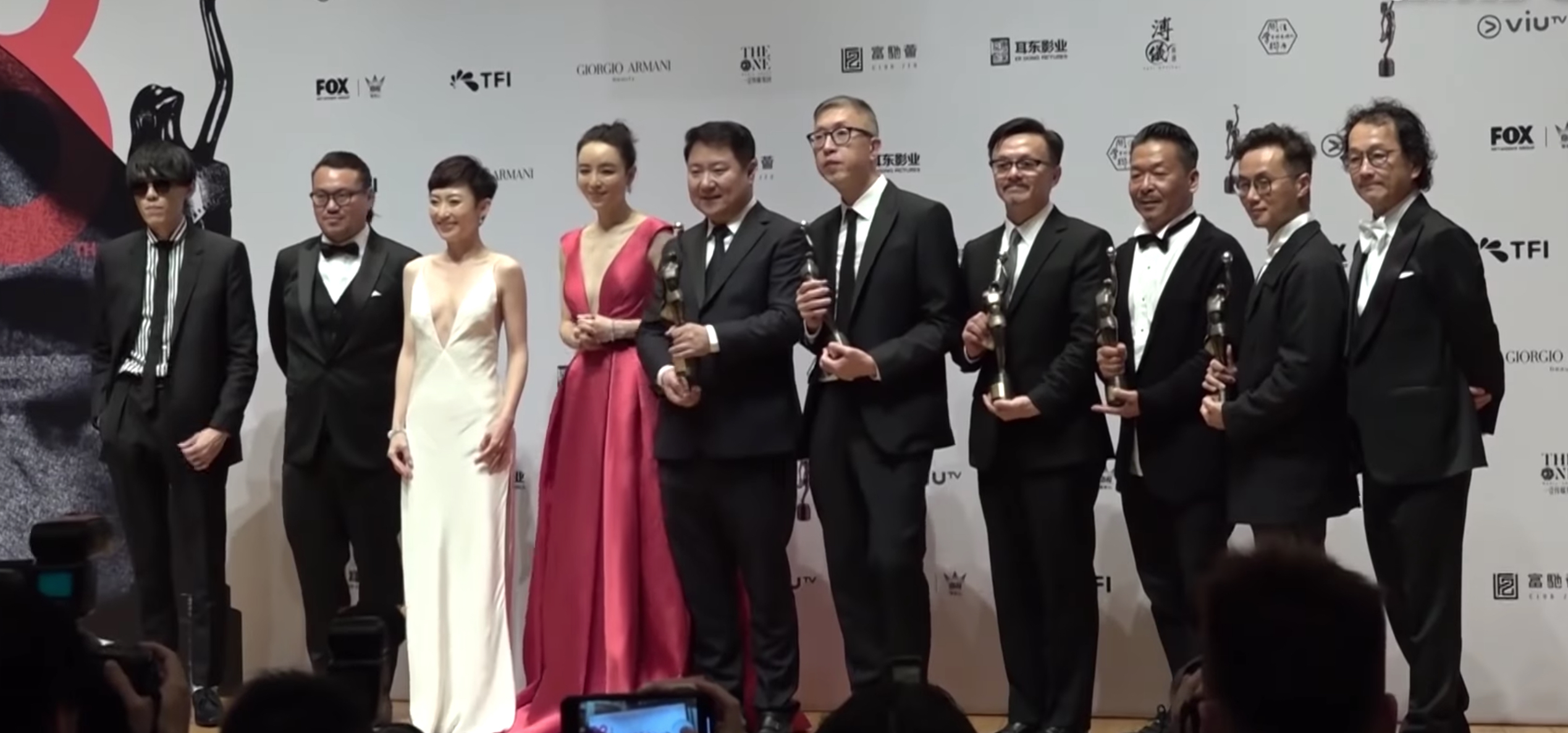
Cast and crew of ''Project Gutenberg'' at the 38th Hong Kong Film Awards

Ceremony	Category	Recipient	Result
38th Hong Kong Film Awards	Best Film	Project Gutenberg	Won
38th Hong Kong Film Awards	Best Director	Felix Chong	Won
38th Hong Kong Film Awards	Best Actor	Chow Yun-fat	Nominated
38th Hong Kong Film Awards	Best Actor	Aaron Kwok	Nominated
38th Hong Kong Film Awards	Best Actress	Zhang Jingchu	Nominated
38th Hong Kong Film Awards	Best Supporting Actor	Liu Kai-chi	Nominated
38th Hong Kong Film Awards	Best Supporting Actress	Catherine Chau	Nominated
38th Hong Kong Film Awards	Best Screenplay	Felix Chong	Won
38th Hong Kong Film Awards	Best Cinematography	Jason Kwan	Won
38th Hong Kong Film Awards	Best Film Editing	Curran Pang	Won
38th Hong Kong Film Awards	Best Art Direction	Eric Lam	Won
38th Hong Kong Film Awards	Best Costume Make Up Design	Man Lim-chung	Won
38th Hong Kong Film Awards	Best Action Choreography	Nicky Li	Nominated
38th Hong Kong Film Awards	Best Original Film Score	Day Tai	Nominated
38th Hong Kong Film Awards	Best Original Film Song	Song: Let Us Be the One Composer: Day Tai; Lyricist: Saville Chan; Singer: Jan Curious	Nominated
38th Hong Kong Film Awards	Best Sound Design	Dhanarat Dhitirojana, Kaikangwol Rungsakorn, Sarunyu Nurnsai	Nominated
38th Hong Kong Film Awards	Best Visual Effects	Alex Lim	Nominated
13th Asian Film Awards	Best Actor	Aaron Kwok	Nominated
13th Asian Film Awards	Best Screenplay	Felix Chong	Nominated
13th Asian Film Awards	Best Film Editing	Curran Pang	Nominated
13th Asian Film Awards	Best Costume Design	Man Lim-chung	Nominated
13th Asian Film Awards	Best Visual Effects	Alex Lim	Won
25th Hong Kong Film Critics Society Awards	Best Director	Felix Chong	Nominated
25th Hong Kong Film Critics Society Awards	Best Screenplay	Felix Chong	Nominated
25th Hong Kong Film Critics Society Awards	Best Actor	Chow Yun-fat	Nominated
25th Hong Kong Film Critics Society Awards	Best Actress	Catherine Chau	Nominated
25th Hong Kong Film Critics Society Awards	Film of Merit	Project Gutenberg	Won

== See also ==
- Chow Yun-fat filmography
- Aaron Kwok filmography
- The Usual Suspects
- Vertigo (film)
