= Golden Job =

2018 Hong Kong film by Chin Ka-lok

- Film poster
- Traditional Chinese: 黃金兄弟
- Simplified Chinese: 黄金兄弟
- Hanyu Pinyin: Huáng Jīn Xiōng Dì
- Jyutping: Wong4 Gam1 Hing1 Dai6
- Directed by: Chin Ka-lok
- Screenplay by: Kim Dong-kyu; Kwok Kin-lok; Erica Li; Heiward Mak
- Produced by: Eric Tsang; Herman Peng; Sasaki Kyo
- Starring: Ekin Cheng; Jordan Chan; Michael Tse; Chin Ka-lok; Jerry Lamb
- Cinematography: Kenny Tse; Edmond Fung
- Edited by: Wenders Li; Barfuss Hui
- Music by: Chan Kwong-wing; Kay Chan
- Production companies: Beijing Sparkle Roll Media Corporation; The Entertainer Production; Beijing Yao Yang Xin Ying Investment; Kwan's International; New Film Association; The Artists Co.
- Distributed by: Intercontinental Film Distributors (HK)
- Release date: 20 September 2018
- Running time: 99 minutes
- Country: Hong Kong
- Languages: Cantonese; Japanese; English; Hungarian
- Box office: US$47.3 million

Golden Job is a 2018 Hong Kong action film directed by Chin Ka-lok, who also stars in the film alongside Ekin Cheng, Jordan Chan, Michael Tse and Jerry Lamb. The film was released in Hong Kong on 20 September 2018. Filming locations for Golden Job included Taiwan, Japan, Hungary, Montenegro, Beijing and Inner Mongolia.

== Plot ==
A group of mercenaries consists of the resourceful and courageous leader Lion ( Ekin Cheng), the hot-tempered sniper Crater ( Jordan Chan ), the greedy intelligence agent Bill (Michael Tse), the ace driver Calm ( Chin Ka -lok), and the simple and content hacker Mouse ( Lam Hiu -fung). After a failed rescue mission in Inner Mongolia, China, arranged by their superior Rice (Sergej Onopko), they all resign and go their separate ways.

Five years later, Lion obtains medicine from a pharmaceutical company and transports it to a refugee camp in Africa. In the years, Lion has been dedicated to charity work. Unexpectedly, a new epidemic breaks out in the camp. Zoe (Charmaine Sheh), Lion's girlfriend and a doctor working there, says she needs the new medicine. At this time, Bill tells the brothers that a shipment of new medicine is about to be transported to Budapest Airport in Hungary, under the surveillance and protection of Joe (Phil Cheung), the deputy head of the Special Operations Unit of the Intelligence Bureau. Therefore, Lion gathers his brothers to take action against the Intelligence Bureau. The five brothers, along with their adoptive father and mentor, Cho Sir (Eric Tsang), and his daughter Lulu (Zhang Yamei), each used their skills to set a trap in the city. They lured a truck monitored by the Intelligence Bureau into a tunnel, then switched it with another truck, and the plan succeeded. However, when Crater drove the truck to the train depot and was about to leave with his brothers and Cao and his daughter, he noticed something amiss. After Mouse unlocked the door, they discovered that the truck was carrying gold instead of medicine. It turned out that Bill had secretly colluded with Rice, who was assisting the Intelligence Bureau in monitoring the transport, and used the brothers to steal the gold earned by the Intelligence Bureau from selling arms. When Rice, leading his henchmen, arrived at the train depot, he found Bill's brothers, Cao and Lulu are still there. Fearing they would report to the intelligence department, he ordered Bill to shoot them to silence them. The gunfight and car chase ensued, during which Cao was shot in the leg and rendered immobile. Rice, having failed to kill the group and Cao, refused to give Bill any reward. Engaged, Bill shoots Rice and took the gold for himself, and the henchmen became his subordinates. Lion deliberately rammed his car into the police station to evade his henchmen's pursuit, and he was arrested as a result. At this moment, he recalled some past events.

It turns out that these five brothers were all orphans. When they were young, they got into a fight with others at an entertainment venue to stop inappropriate behavior. They were arrested and detained by the police, but were then released and taken in by Cao Sir, the manager of the entertainment venue, who trained them to be mercenaries. After they came of age, they voted to call Cao Sir "Dad," officially regarding him as their adoptive father.

While Lion was serving his sentence, Crater waited for him in the slums, Calm worked at a bar, Mouse ran a hot spring inn with Inspector Cao and his daughter in Kumamoto Prefecture, Japan, and Bill bought an island in Kuroyama. A year later, Lion, having served his sentence, went to the slums with Calm to pick up Crater. The three then went to Japan to meet Cao and Lulu, as well as Mouse. During dinner, Cao's friend Morimoto ( played by Yasuaki Kurata ) also came to the inn. It turned out that Inspector Cao's arrival had brought life back to the area, so Morimoto told everyone that he planned to hold a sake festival and invited them to help.

While soaking in a hot spring, the four brothers talked about Bill. Crater expressed his suspicion that Bill had a debt, but was unwilling to trouble his brothers to help him. Lion said that Joe had met with him in prison and asked him to find Bill and return the gold after his release. Calm said that Bill had been present at all the car shows held in the past year. The four brothers decided to bring Bill back to Fukuoka for questioning at a car show. Unexpectedly, after they left the hot spring hotel, Bill led his henchmen to break in. He then sent another group of henchmen to the car show to ambush the four. The four successfully escaped the henchmen's pursuit and immediately drove back to the hotel. However, during the struggle, Cao Sir and Bill are arguing until Cao was killed by Bill's henchmen. Bill furiously confront while attack his henchmen for killing Cao. After learning that the four were driving back to the hotel, Bill left the hotel with his henchmen and returned to Black Mountain, where he kidnapped Lulu. When the four returned to the hotel, they were heartbroken to see Cao Sir lying dead. After leaving the funeral venue, Mouse told the three that Bill was in Black Mountain, but Cao Sir didn't want to see his brothers break up, so he forbade him to say it. The four brothers were determined to find and hunt traitor Bill. Risking their lives, they fought their way from Japan to Montenegro. After obtaining a large amount of equipment and information about Bill's location from Joe, they attacked the island where Bill was located, engaging in a series of fierce gun battles. They killed many soldiers and Bill's men on the island, successfully storming Bill's headquarters inside a church. After confronted with Bill and disowning their brotherhood, he tricked Crater into shooting himself. Joe retrieved the gold, but denied it when questioned by reporters about whether it had been obtained illegally by intelligence. Finally, when Lion returned to the refugee camp to meet Zoe, he learned that Bill had sent her medicine during his imprisonment.

== Cast ==
Golden Job reunited the cast from the Young and Dangerous film series, Ekin Cheng, Jordan Chan, Michael Tse and Jerry Lamb, together.

- Ekin Cheng as Lion (獅王), the rational and calm leader of the group.
- Jordan Chan as Crater (火山), the short-tempered, but skilled marksman of the group.
- Michael Tse as Bill Leung, the traitor of the group, who is greedy, bitter, and refuses to acknowledge his mistakes. He schemes with Rice to steal gold.
- Chin Ka-lok as Calm (淡定), the group's ace driver.
- Jerry Lamb as Mouse (老鼠), the simple-minded tech expert of the group.
- Phil Chang as Joe, deputy commissioner of The Agency who assists the group in location Bill and the missing gold.
- Eric Tsang as Cho Sir (曹Sir), the adopted father and mentor of the five brothers, whom they refer to as Papa (阿爸).
- Zhang Yamei as Lulu (璐璐), Cho's daughter
- Yasuaki Kurata as Morimoto-San (森本), Cho's friend who resides in Fukuoka.
- Charmaine Sheh as Dr. Zoey Chow (周醫生), Lion's girlfriend who is a Médecins Sans Frontières doctor working in Africa.
- Sergej Onopko as Rick Rice, the group's former superior who schemes with Bill in stealing gold. He is later murdered by Bill after he insults him for betraying his brothers.
- Billy Chow as Rice's main henchman who later works for Bill after the former was killed by Bill.
- Alan Ng as Rice's Lead Henchman who constantly leads henchmen to eliminate the brothers.

== Theme song ==
- Song: Bro (一起衝一起闖)
  - Composer: Chan Kwong-wing
  - Lyricist: Chan Kwong-wing, Fiona Fung, Jeffrey Chu
  - Singer: Ekin Cheng, Jordan Chan, Michael Tse, Chin Ka-lok, Jerry Lamb

== Reception ==
=== Critical reception ===
Elizabeth Kerr of The Hollywood Reporter and notes the film's nostalgic and entertaining value and praises the film's tech and action choreography. Edmund Lee of the South China Morning Post gave the film a score of 3/5 and calls it "a most contrived story that nevertheless entertains." Carey Darling of the Houston Chronicle gave the film a score of 2 stars out of 5 and criticizes its predictability and lack of substance. Andrew Saroch of Far East Films praises the film's set pieces and the casts' performances.

=== Box office ===
Golden Job grossed a total of US$47,279,677 worldwide, combining its box office gross from Hong Kong, China, United States and Australia.

In Hong Kong, the film grossed s total of HK$10,888,179 during its theatrical run from 20 September to 29 October 2018.

In China, the film grossed a total of ¥317,488,000.

== Accolades ==
Ceremony	Category	Recipient	Results
38th Hong Kong Film Awards	Best Action Choreography	Chin Ka-lok	Nominated
38th Hong Kong Film Awards	Best Original Film Score	Chan Kwong-wing	Nominated
38th Hong Kong Film Awards	Best Original Film Song	Song: Bro (一起衝一起闖) Composer: Chan Kwong-wing; Lyricist: Chan Kwong-wing, Fiona Fung, Jeffrey Chu; Singer: Ekin Cheng, Jordan Chan, Michael Tse, Chin Ka-lok, Jerry Lamb	Nominated
2nd Kongest Film Awards	My Favorite Hong Kong Film	Golden Job	Nominated
