= Sek Kei =

Hong Kong film critic

- 黃志強
- Born: Wong Chi-chung; 1946 (age 79–80); Macau
- Occupation: Film critic
- Years active: 1971–present

Wong Chi-chung (Chinese: 黃志強; born 1946), known professionally as Sek Kei (石琪), is a Hong Kong film critic. He received the Professional Achievement Award in the 41st Hong Kong Film Awards for his contributions in the film industry.

== Biography ==
Sek Kei was born Wong Chi-chung in Macau in 1946. In the 1960s, Sek began submitting film reviews to The Chinese Student Weekly at the age of seventeen. Although his articles were initially rejected, he received a reply letter from the chief editor, Law Kar, who encouraged him to continue writing film reviews. Since then, he has pursued a career as a film critic, contributing film reviews to various newspapers and magazines for almost sixty years. Sek started his film review column in Ming Pao in January 1971. He has published a total of eight books, collectively titled Collection of Sek Kei film critiques, which encompass his film reviews up until the 1990s.

Sek directed an experimental film called Dead Knot in 1969, in collaboration with John Woo. He also co-founded the Hong Kong International Film Festival and the Hong Kong Film Archive. In 2023, Sek received the Professional Achievement Award in the 41st Hong Kong Film Awards, alongside Law Kar, for his contributions in the film industry.

== Personal life ==
Sek is married to novel writer Lu Li.

== Filmography ==
=== Film ===
Year	Title	Director	Writer	Notes
1969	Dead Knot	Yes	Yes	

== Awards and nominations ==
Year	Award	Category	Nominated work	Result	Ref.
2023	41st Hong Kong Film Awards	Professional Achievement Award	—N/a	Won	
