= Three Husbands (2018 film) =

2018 Hong Kong film by Fruit Chan

- Three Husbands poster
- Simplified Chinese: 三夫
- Hanyu Pinyin: Sanfu
- Directed by: Fruit Chan
- Screenplay by: Fruit Chan; Jason Lam Kee To
- Produced by: Fruit Chan; Doris Yang; Sammi Chan; Chan Wai Keung
- Starring: Zeng Meihuizi; Peter Chan
- Cinematography: Benny Chan Ka Shun
- Edited by: Fruit Chan (as Sup Fat Tin)
- Music by: Chan Chi Yeung; Nip Kei Wing
- Production company: Nicetop Independent Ltd.
- Release dates: 26 October 2018 (31st Tokyo International Film Festival); 28 March 2019 (Hong Kong)
- Running time: 101 minutes
- Country: Hong Kong
- Language: Cantonese

Three Husbands (Chinese: 三夫) is a 2018 Hong Kong film directed by Fruit Chan, starring Zeng Meihuizi and Peter Chan. It is the last installment of his "Prostitute trilogy" which Chan directed from 2000 to 2018. The other two movies in the trilogy are Durian Durian (Qin Hailu as lead actress, 2000) and Hollywood Hong Kong (Zhou Xun as lead actress, 2001). The three lead actresses starring in his "Prostitute trilogy" were nominated as Golden Horse Award for Best Leading Actress for their respective role in a film of the trilogy, and Qin Hailu won the award for her role in Durian Durian.

The film premiered at the 31st Tokyo International Film Festival on 26 October 2018.

== Plot ==
In her boldest performance yet, Zeng Meihuizi stars as a woman who lives on the sea with her three husbands. With an overactive libido, she heartily devotes herself to her work as a prostitute. As in the trilogy's two previous films, Chan uses the world's oldest profession to satirise the state of contemporary Hong Kong.

== Cast ==
- Zeng Meihuizi as Ah Mui
- Peter Chan as Four Eyes / Little Bro
- Keung Mak as Big Bro
- Chan Man-lei as Second Bro
- Sai Man Ho as Fatty
- Larine Tang as Sau Ming
- Xia Ren as Shui

== Reception ==
On review aggregator website Rotten Tomatoes, the film holds an approval rating of 40% based on five reviews, with an average rating of 4.5/10.

== Awards and nominations ==
Year	Award	Category	Recipients	Result
2018	55th Golden Horse Awards	Best Leading Actress	Chloe Maayan	Nominated
2018	31st Tokyo International Film Festival	Grand Prix	Three Husbands (directed by Fruit Chan)	Nominated
2019	13th Asian Film Awards	Best Actress	Chloe Maayan	Nominated
2019	13th Asian Film Awards	Best Director	Fruit Chan	Nominated
2019	13th Asian Film Awards	Best Newcomer	Peter Chan	Nominated
2019	25th Hong Kong Film Critics Society Award	Best Film	Three Husbands	Won
2019	25th Hong Kong Film Critics Society Award	Best Director	Fruit Chan	Won
2019	25th Hong Kong Film Critics Society Award	Best Actress	Chloe Maayan	Won
2019	25th Hong Kong Film Critics Society Award	Best Screenwriter	Fruit Chan, Lam Kei-to	Nominated
2019	38th Hong Kong Film Awards	Best Films	Three Husbands	Nominated
2019	38th Hong Kong Film Awards	Best Director	Fruit Chan	Nominated
2019	38th Hong Kong Film Awards	Best Actress	Chloe Maayan	Won
2019	38th Hong Kong Film Awards	Best New Performer	Peter Chan	Nominated
