= Jeffrey Cheung =

American artist and skateboarder

- Born: 1989 (age 36–37); San Francisco Bay Area, U.S.
- Education: University of California Santa Cruz
- Notable work: Unity Skateboarding; There Skateboards

Jeffrey Cheung (b. 1989), also known as Jeff Cheung, is an American artist, skateboarder, curator, musician, community organizer, co-founder of Unity Skateboarding and There Skateboards.

== Early life and education ==
Cheung was born in 1989 and raised in the Bay Area, graduating from the University of California Santa Cruz.

== Art ==
=== Art practice ===
Cheung paints and draws on canvas, paper, and other materials. In March 2024, Cheung was part of a group of artists who altered their own works on display at the Yerba Buena Center for the Arts with messages in support of freedom for Palestinians and a ceasefire in the ongoing Israel-Gaza war.

=== Curating ===
In August 2024, Cheung and Gabriel Ramirez curated a show titled Unity Through Skateboarding at the San Francisco Museum of Modern Art.

== Skateboarding ==
=== Unity Skateboarding ===
Unity Skateboarding started as a monthly meet-up in 2012 after Cheung met Gabriel Ramirez and they decided to begin the initiative. The Unity collective, officially known as Unity Press & Skateboarding, produces zines, boards, art, and parties The Unity collective hosts Unity Fest.

In 2024, Unity released a video with Adidas titled, Fill the Hole in Yr Heart, starring Cheung, Maité Steenhoudt, Shag, Vitória Mendonça, Marbie, Shy’kiel, and others.

=== There Skateboards ===
Established in 2017, Cheung runs There Skateboards, a collective and brand dedicated to supporting queer and trans skateboarders of color (QTPOC). There Skateboards is based out of Deluxe Distribution.

In 2024, There Skateboards released a Nike SB dunk.

== Personal life ==
Cheung is openly gay and married to Gabriel Ramirez. Cheung is of Chinese-American descent.
