= Jason Chan discography =

- Studio albums: 12
- Extended plays: 1
- Compilation albums: 3
- Singles: 51

Hong Kong singer Jason Chan (Chinese: 陳柏宇) has released 12 studio albums, one EP, three compilation albums (including a soundtrack), 56 singles and made other appearances as a featured artist. He made his chart debut with the single "Stubborn" in 2006, and has since released many chart-topping songs.

== Albums ==
=== Studio albums ===
Title	Album details
First Experience	Released: May 3, 2007; Label: Sony BMG; Format: CD+DVD
Change	Released: May 30, 2008; Label: Sony BMG; Format: CD+DVD
Can't Be Half	Released: December 18, 2009; Label: SME Hong Kong; Format: CD+DVD
Put On	Released: October 15, 2010; Label: SME Hong Kong; Format: CD+DVD
Lost and Found	Released: March 23, 2012; Label: SME Hong Kong; Format: CD+DVD
The Next Moment	Released: March 15, 2013; Label: SME Hong Kong; Format: CD
Tales	Released: November 25, 2013; Label: SME Hong Kong; Format: CD
Escape	Released: June 19, 2015; Label: SME Hong Kong; Format: CD, digital download, streaming
I	Released: November 24, 2017; Label: SME Hong Kong; Format: CD, digital download, streaming, vinyl
Present	Released: December 7, 2018; Label: SME Hong Kong; Format: CD, digital download, streaming
Anyone but Jason	Released: December 20, 2019; Label: SME Hong Kong; Format: CD, digital download, streaming
53FPS	Released: June 25, 2021; Label: SME Hong Kong; Format: CD, digital download, streaming

=== Compilation albums ===
Title	Album details
Quinquennium	
Ever Before OST	
The Players	Released: October 28, 2016; Label: SME Hong Kong; Format: CD, Vinyl

=== Live albums ===
Title	Album details
Jason Chan TALES Live 2013/14	
The Players Live in Concert	
Speechless Live in Concert 2017	Released: February 9, 2017; Label: SME Hong Kong; Format: DVD, CD
Fight For____Live In Hong Kong Coliseum	Released: January 25, 2022 Label: SME Hong Kong Format: 2CD+Blu-Ray, digital download, streaming

=== Reissued Albums ===
Title	Album details
First Experience Reloaded 永久保存珍藏版	Released: October 29, 2007

== Extended plays ==
Title	Album details
Close Up	Released: May 13, 2009

== Singles ==
=== As main artist ===
List of singles, with selected chart positions, showing year released and album name
Title	Year	Peak chart positions				Album
Title	Year	903	RTHK	997	TVB	Album
"Stubborn" 固執	2006	—	3	5	3	First Experience
斷絕來往	2007	14	3	4	3	First Experience
"Key" 車匙	2007	—	3	8	—	First Experience
"Maintain Forever" 永久保存	2007	2	1	5	2	First Experience Reloaded
最佳努力獎	2007	7	6	8	1	First Experience Reloaded
"I Miss You" (feat. Fiona Fung)	2008	2	1	2	2	Change
你來自那顆星	2008	17	5	2	2	Change
理智與感情 (with Rainie Yang)	2008	—	7	—	—	Change
"I Will Be Loving You"	2009	1	3	3	1	Close Up
你瞞我瞞	2009	1	1	5	4	Close Up
逸後	2009	—	—	—	—	Close Up
"Half Dating" 拍一半拖	2009	9	3	2	3	Can't Be Half
無可厚非	2009	10	1	3	—	Can't Be Half
人外有人	2010	19	4	6	—	Can't Be Half
别怕失去	2010	1	3	2	—	Put On
多此一爱	2010	—	3	2	—	Put On
無限 (with Phil Lam)	2011	2	3	2	—	Quinquennium
"Dignity" 尊嚴	2011	—	5	3	—	Quinquennium
命案	2012	—	1	1	—	Lost and Found
時機	2012	10	10	4	—	Lost and Found
動物農莊	2012	2	3	—	—	Lost and Found
"Let the Bullets Fly" 讓子彈飛	2013	7	1	2	—	The Next Moment
夭心夭肺	2013	6	1	2	—	The Next Moment
身邊人	2013	1	5	1	—	The Next Moment
贖罪	2013	—	—	—	—	The Next Moment
我沒有	2013	—	—	—	—	The Next Moment
矛盾大對決	2013	9	11	11	—	Tales
"Baby Don't Cry"	2013	19	8	4	—	Tales
"I Wanna Fly"	2014	3	—	6	—	Tales
"Brave Romance" 勇者的浪漫 (with VnP)	2014	5	3	1	—	Kano OST (Hong Kong edition) and Jason Chan Tales Live 2013/14
"A Look and a Smile" 回眸一笑	2015	1	1	1	1	Escape
“Missing You" 別來無恙	2015	—	1	1	1	Escape
航拍	2015	—	—	5	—	Escape
"Dearest Enemy" 親愛的仇人	2015	—	3	—	—	Escape
告别之前	2016	1	1	1	1	Ever After OST
请跟我走	2016	2	16	3	1	Ever After OST
"The Last Episode"上集大结局	2016	2	1	1	1	The Players
"Mat Cing" 乜青	2016	3	3	2	1	The Players
"Without You, I am Nothing" 沒有你，我甚麼都不是	2016	1	1	1	1	The Players
巴别塔	2017	—	5	4	7	The Players
行屍走肉	2017	1	5	1	8	I
霸氣情歌	2017	2	1	1	1	I
"Brick" 磚頭	2017	1	1	—	3	I
閱後即焚	2017	1	3	1	6	I
交叉神經	2018	17	1	2	—	I
無限大	2018	3	1	1	3	Present
認真如初	2018	1	1	1	1	Present
後排慶功宴	2018	19	2	3	—	Present
中佬旅行團	2019	9	10	2	—	Present

(*)Still on music chart

"—" denotes a recording that did not chart or was not released to that station

=== As featured artist ===
Title	Year	Album
"U Are My Everything" (Fiona Fung featuring Jason Chan)	2008	N/A
"Life Plan" 生涯規劃 (Janice Vidal featuring Jason Chan)	2018	N/A

== Other charted songs ==
Title	Year	Chart	Peak position	Notes
支柱 (with Ken Hung)	2012	RTHK	1	Theme song for the short film Love. Zero AIDS
"Power Your Life" 原力 (with Pakho Chau, Ken Hung, Alfred Hui)	2016	RTHK	1	Theme song for Solar Project 2016
