= Yusuke Hatano =

Japanese composer, arranger and pianist

- Also known as: 波多野裕介
- Born: New Jersey, United States
- Occupations: Composer, musician, arranger
- Instruments: Keyboard, piano,
- Years active: 2013–present
- Label: Neo Music Production Ltd

Yusuke Hatano (波多野 裕介, Hatano Yūsuke; born 1986) is a Japanese composer, arranger and pianist known for his work on the soundtracks for films such as The Great Detective, Wu Kong, Mad World and Soul Mate, and games such as Chronos Gate. He won the Best Original Film Score recognition for Soul Mate at the 36th Hong Kong Film Awards.

== Early life and education ==
Hatano was born in New Jersey, returned to Japan, and studied high school in Singapore and Malaysia. During his university life at the University of Queensland in Brisbane, Australia, he won the Percy Brier Memorial Prize with his composition Oriental Isolation. Interested in a range of musical genres – from classical and jazz to contemporary and electronic music – Hatano spent the formative years of his career as a jazz pianist in Brisbane, before relocating to Hong Kong in 2011.

== Career ==
Hatano's film compositions have attracted international attention, with his work for the film Full Strike debuting with a world premiere at the 2015 Osaka Asian Film Festival. Full Strike was the winner of Best Asian Film at the Neuchâtel International Fantastic Film Festival (NIFFF) 2015, and the official selection of Osaka Asian Film Festival 2015 and New York Asian Film Festival 2015. In 2017, Hatano was nominated for the Best Original Music for film "Soul Mate" at the 11th Asian Film Awards, and for the 36th Hong Kong Film Awards, he has been nominated for Best Original Film Song for film "Happiness", Best Original Music for film "Mad World" and Best Original Music for film "Soul Mate". In this year, Hatano won BEST ORIGINAL MUSIC at the Hong Kong Film Award, Los Angeles Golden Screen Award, and China Hamilton Behind the Scenes Award.

Hatano has written scores for films including "Mad World" directed by Chun Wong starring Eric Tsang and Shawn Yue, Soulmate produced by Peter Chan and Jo Jo Hui, directed by Derek Tsang starring Zhou Dongyu and Sichun Ma, Line Walker directed by Jazz Boon starring Nick Cheung, Louis Koo, Francis Ng, and Charmaine Sheh, Happiness directed by Andy Lo Yiu Fai starring Kara Hui and Carlos Chan which won the Asian CineVision 2016 Asian Media Humanitarian Award in New York as well as Best Actress and Best Supporting Actor at the 7th Macau International Movie Festival, GOOD TAKE! : Cement, GOOD TAKE! : The Banquet, GOOD TAKE! : GOOD TAKE, Full Strike, and Hardcore Comedy: Shocking Wet Dreams. He is also the composer for the Madhead app game Chronosgate. He has also composed music for pop artists including for Softhard concert promotion, Ken Hung, arranged music for Vivian Chan and AGA.

== Performances ==
In 2012, Hatano was the featured pianist for charity jazz concert Love Affairs with Jolie. In 2015, he performed Leslie Cheung’s song 你在何地 at the Hong Kong Coliseum with director Derek Kwok at famous lyricist Calvin Poon's "P For Poon Party" Concert. In 2016, he performed with William So and 為你鍾情 composer Wong Ching Yu for Community Chest on TVB. In October 2016, charity jazz concert "Moments with Anne", with Yusuke Hatano as the director and pianist, had donated over $200,000 to the Community Chest of Hong Kong. As the music director and featured pianist, Yusuke performed for the countdown performance of 2019 to 2020 at MGM Cotai Macau.

== Filmography ==
English title	Original title	Year	Role(s)
Monster Run	怪物先生	2020	Composer
Legally Declared Dead	死因無可疑	2020	Composer
Knockout	我們永不言棄	2020	Composer
The Knight of Shadows: Between Yin and Yang	"雙生焰" (神探蒲松齡)	2019	Composer
The Knight of Shadows: Between Yin and Yang	"一起笑出来" (神探蒲松齡)	2019	Composer
Line Walker 2: Invisible Spy	使徒行者2 ：諜影行動	2019	Composer
The Great Detective	大偵探霍桑	2019	Composer
Wu Kong	"紫" (悟空傳)	2017	Composer
Zombiology: Enjoy Yourself Tonight	今晚打喪屍	2017	Composer
Mad World	一念無明	2017	Composer
Soul Mate	七月與安生	2016	Composer
Happiness	幸運是我	2016	Composer
Line Walker	使徒行者	2016	Composer
Full Strike	全力扣殺	2015	Composer
GOOD TAKE!: Cement	GOOD TAKE!: 水泥	2014	Composer
GOOD TAKE!:The Banquet	GOOD TAKE!: 囍宴	2014	Composer
GOOD TAKE!: GOOD TAKE	GOOD TAKE!: GOOD TAKE	2014	Composer
Hardcore Comedy: Shocking Wet Dreams	重口味：驚嘩春夢	2013	Composer

== Games ==
Game title	First Released	Original System(s)	Yusuke's Role(s)
Chronos Gate 時空之門	2016	App Store / Play Store	Composer

== Works for pop albums ==
(In Order of Starting Year of Affiliation)

Artist	Album	Year	Yusuke's Role(s)
AGA		2017	Arranger for 3AM
Ken Hung	那天	2015	Composer and Arranger for 黑心King
Vivian Chan	小人物	2015	Arranger for 完場曲
AGA	AGA	2013	Arranger for 一釐米
AGA		2021	Arranger for CityPop
AGA		2023	Arranger for MIZU

== Awards and nominations ==
Year	Awards Ceremony	Award	Nomination	Results
2017	36th Hong Kong Film Awards	Best Original Film Song	"Better Tomorrow" (Composer, Lyrics, Singer); Happiness	Nominated
2017	36th Hong Kong Film Awards	Best Original Film Score	Mad World	Nominated
2017	36th Hong Kong Film Awards	Best Original Film Score	Soul Mate (With Peter Kam)	Won
2017	11th Asian Film Awards	Best Original Music	Soul Mate (With Peter Kam)	Nominated
