= Love Is Elsewhere =

2008 Hong Kong film by Vincent Chiu

- Traditional Chinese: 愛情萬歲
- Simplified Chinese: 爱情万岁
- Directed by: Vincent Chiu
- Written by: Cheuk-yin Chan; Wai-yan Chan; Cheung Fan; Suet-yan Lau; Chi-hoi Pang; Ray Pang
- Starring: Pakho Chau; Ken Hung; Jason Chan; Sherman Chung; Yumiko Cheng; Chelsea Tong; Charmaine Fong; Patrick Tang
- Production companies: Buddy Film; Entertainment International; Mastermind Film Production
- Release date: 17 April 2008
- Running time: 98 minutes
- Country: Hong Kong
- Language: Cantonese

Love Is Elsewhere (愛情萬歲) is a 2008 Hong Kong romantic drama film. The film is based on an original story by Cheung Fan (張帆), edited by Yau Chi Wai (邱志偉) and directed by Vincent Chui (崔允信). The film had its world premiere at the 32nd Hong Kong International Film Festival in 2008.

== Cast ==
- Pakho Chau as Joe Yueng (楊溢德)
- Ken Hung as Ah Sing (阿星)
- Jason Chan as Ah Sung (阿生)
- Sherman Chung as Yat-Ching Wong (黃日晴)
- Yumiko Cheng as Sandra (阿如)
- Chelsea Tong as Kelly
- Charmaine Fong as Maggie
- Patrick Tang as Ji-Ho Fong (方志豪)
- Louis Cheung as Martin Hui (許少雄)

Guest appearance

- Clarence Hui (許願) as Ah Sing's uncle

== Featured songs ==
- "Foolish Boy" (傻小子) - Pakho Chau from the album Continue
- "Rare" (萬中無一) - Jason Chan from the album First Experience
- "Love. Gutless" (愛. 無膽) - Ken Hung from the album Love. Gutless
