= Integrity (film) =

2019 Hong Kong film by Alan Mak

- Official film poster
- Traditional Chinese: 廉政風雲
- Simplified Chinese: 廉政风云
- Hanyu Pinyin: Lián Zhèng Fēng Yún
- Jyutping: Lim4 Zing3 Fung1 Wan4 Yin1 Mok6
- Directed by: Alan Mak
- Written by: Alan Mak; Ram Ling
- Produced by: Felix Chong; Ronald Wong
- Starring: Sean Lau; Nick Cheung; Karena Lam
- Cinematography: Jake Pollock
- Edited by: Curran Pang
- Music by: Anthony Chue
- Production companies: Emperor Motion Pictures; Stellar Mega Films
- Distributed by: Emperor Motion Pictures; UA Films
- Release date: 5 February 2019 (Hong Kong)
- Running time: 114 minutes
- Country: Hong Kong
- Language: Cantonese
- Budget: HK$100 million
- Box office: US$21.3 million

Integrity is a 2019 Hong Kong crime drama film written and directed by Alan Mak and starring Sean Lau, Nick Cheung and Karena Lam. The film revolves around an ICAC case involving the selling of smuggled cigarettes and is the first installment of a planned trilogy. Production for Integrity began in April 2018 and was released on 5 February 2019, the first day of the Chinese New Year holiday period.

== Plot ==
The Independent Commission Against Corruption (ICAC) has been investigating a serious illegal domestic sales bribery case for many years. However, the court orders a one-week postponement because the first defendant, Chan Chiu-kwan, the head of a trading firm, jumps bail and absconds. In addition, the only important witness and whistleblower, Hui Chik-yiu, the former financial director of the company, is absent from court to testify.

To ensure the case can be retried in seven days, the ICAC launches an operation. The captain in charge of the case, Chan King-chi, and the officer responsible for locating witnesses, Shirley Kong, were once a devoted couple working together in the ICAC. They have been separated for a long time and have to work together for the case. In the process of arresting Chan Chiu-kwan and searching for Hui, they discover a figure operating behind the scenes.

== Cast ==
- Sean Lau as Chan King-chi (陳敬慈), ICAC principal investigator
- Nick Cheung as Jack Hui Chik-yiu (許植堯), King-chi's childhood friend and an important witness of the selling of smuggled cigarettes bribery case
- Karena Lam as Shirley Kong Suet-yee (江雪兒) an ICAC Investigator/Expert negotiator and estranged wife of Chan King-chi
- Anita Yuen as Chung Ka-ling (鍾嘉玲), a customs official charged with corruption
- Alex Fong as Ma Yuk-man, the ICAC Chief Investigator and supervisor of King and Shirley
- Deep Ng as Big Boss
- Carlos Chan as Gary, an ICAC Investigator and subordinate of King
- Kathy Yuen as Tsz Ching (芷晴), an ICAC Investigator and subordinate of King
- Hugo Ng as Ko Ching-man (高正文), defense barrister
- Charlene Chang as Jenny
- Christopher Sin

== Production ==
=== Development ===
The project was first announced to be in development in December 2017, with Alan Mak writing and directing, and his frequent collaborator Felix Chong serving as producer, and set to star Sean Lau, Nick Cheung and Karena Lam. Lau was cast as an ICAC investigator, Cheung as a widower who has also lost his daughter, and Lam as Lau's wife.

On 19 March 2018, the film was promoted at the Hong Kong Filmart, where it was attended by director/writer Mak, producers Chong and Ronald Wong and cast members Lau, Cheung, Lam, Michelle Wai and Kathy Yuen. There, Mak also revealed that he developed several stories for the film and decided that Integrity would be the first installment of a planned trilogy.

=== Filming ===
Principal photography for Integrity began in April 2018. On 11 April, a scene was filmed in a restaurant in Central, Hong Kong where Lau confronts Anita Yuen, who guest stars as a corrupt customs director. On 24 April, filming was carried out indoors with cast members Lau, Cheung, Alex Fong, Carlos Chan and Kathy Yuen, while Albert Yeung, head of Emperor Motion Pictures, also visited the set. There, Lau also revealed that director Mak helped him prepare for his role as an ICAC investigator by giving him research information and introducing him to former ICAC agents. Production for Integrity officially ended on 24 July 2018, with a wrap-up ceremony attended by the cast and crew. Aside from Hong Kong, filming also took place on location in Australia.

== Box office ==
Cast and crew celebrating the film's box office success (March 2019)

Opening on 5 February 2019 in Hong Kong, Integrity played to blockbuster business, with showings at multiple cinemas being sold out. The film grossed HK$3.5 million on its opening day, making it the highest single day gross of the day. On the second day of release, the film has reached a gross of HK$8 million and had quickly passed the HK$10 million mark by its third day of release. A day later, the film has reached a gross of HK$15.05 million.

Shortly after, the film has also managed to pass the HK$20 million mark by its sixth day of release which was also the beginning of its second week of release. By 14 February, the film has reached a gross of HK$23 million. By the end of its second weekend (17 February), the film has accumulated a total gross of HK$28,078,348.

During its third week of release on 19 February, the film has passed its HK$30 million mark, making it the box office champion among local films during the Chinese New Year holiday period.

Integrity grossed a total of HK$31,253,306 (US$3,982,632) at the Hong Kong box office and was the highest-grossing domestic film and the fourth highest-grossing film overall of 2019 in the territory.
