= Line Walker 2: Invisible Spy =

2019 Hong Kong-Chinese film by Jazz Boon

- Film poster
- Traditional Chinese: 使徒行者2：諜影行動
- Simplified Chinese: 使徒行者2: 谍影行动
- Directed by: Jazz Boon
- Written by: Cat Kwan
- Produced by: Virginia Lok; Andrew Lau
- Starring: Nick Cheung; Louis Koo; Francis Ng
- Cinematography: Jason Kwan
- Edited by: Azrael Chung
- Music by: Yusuke Hatano; Tim Jaeger
- Production companies: Shaw Brothers International Pictures (Hong Kong); Television Broadcasts Limited (Hong Kong)
- Distributed by: Pegasus Motion Pictures; Golden Scene Company Limited
- Release date: 7 August 2019
- Running time: 98 minutes
- Countries: Hong Kong; China
- Languages: Cantonese; Mandarin
- Box office: US$85.7+ million

Line Walker 2: Invisible Spy is a 2019 action thriller film. It is adapted from the 2014 TVB series of the same name and serves as a sequel to the 2016 film Line Walker. Directed by Jazz Boon, the film stars Nick Cheung, Louis Koo and Francis Ng. All major characters in the film are different from the original drama series and the first film. It was released in Hong Kong and mainland China on 7 August 2019 and the US on 16 August 2019.

== Plot ==
In 1987, two boys in the Philippines, Ang Tsai and Ah Dee are attacked by child traffickers. Ang Tsai is taken after he rescues Ah Dee.

In 2019, a businessman drives into a crowd and commits suicide when the police try to arrest him. It is revealed Miu was being blackmailed by terrorists. Superintendent Yip and Chief Inspector Ching of the Criminal Investigation Bureau arrested a journalist and hacker named Yiu Ho yee, who was about to piece together the schemes of a group she claims is an international terrorist organization that abducts children and turns them into moles to work at various police forces around the world. The remaining information is stored in a hard disk in Myanmar. Security Wing Superintendent Cheng takes the case off their hands, and the commissioner of the police sets up a task force to find any double agents. The joint police operation in Myanmar to retrieve the hard disk fails, and Bill, Yiu's assistant, is killed during the police raid. A terrorist steals the hard disk, with Ching and Cheng in pursuit. During a battle with the terrorists, Ching disappears after seemingly being killed by an explosion. The hard disk is obtained by the police but revealed to be empty. Mr. Tung is after for the information in the hard disk before it is revealed. Ching has the real hard disk.

Cheng comes back to Hong Kong and arrests Yiu on the suspicion that she has given a false statement. His unit is attacked by terrorists en route to the police station, and only Cheng and Yiu survive. However, another unit attacks the terrorists and take both Yiu and Cheng. Ching reveals himself to be the leader of the new unit, and confronts Cheng over the terrorists shooting everyone but Cheng. The two scuffle and Ching sees the scar on Cheng's back, realizing Cheng is Ang Tsai while Ching is revealed to be Ah Dee. Cheng flees, and flashbacks reveal his past of being recruited by the terrorist agency ran by Mr. Tung. Cheng had tried to start over and started a family 5 years prior, but Mr. Tung caught Cheng and killed his wife Emma as punishment while sparing Cheng's daughter, Ching Ching. In the present, Cheng returns home to fetch Ching Ching and flee, but realizes that the police and news are covering the place.

Meanwhile, Yiu is taken to a secret task force ran by the police commissioner and the chief superintendent of the police called Invisible Task Force (ITF). Yiu is revealed to have had a younger sister who was kidnapped by the organization and was trying to find her, but she was killed after when she tried to escape the facility. Mr. Tung is after Yiu is because she had hacked into their system and locked their database. Ching asks the commissioner for leniency towards Cheng, as Ching claims he would've been the mole the police were looking for today if Cheng hadn't rescued him in their childhood.

Mr. Tung reveals that Ching Ching is in his custody in which the nanny is revealed to also work for Mr. Tung and forces Cheng to set up a meeting with Ching in order to get Yiu Ho Yee. The meeting is monitored by Mr. Tung's right-hand man, Demon. Demon also lures Yip to the meeting where Yip tries to figure out what's going on. The terrorists then attack them with Demon killing Yip, where he dies in Ching's arms.

Cheng goes to Spain to await further instructions from Mr. Tung. After being given instructions, Cheng asks Mr. Tung about his and his daughter's release as it has been 5 years and Mr. Tung had promised to release them that time. Mr. Tung grows angry, reminding Cheng of how much they invested in him and the fact he blew his cover. Cheng realizes he will spend the rest of his life under Mr. Tung's control. The ITF also goes to Spain as well with Yiu for the operation.

The following day, the operation to protect Yiu Ho Yee is set into motion, and she is transported to a safe house. Meanwhile, Ching arranges a meeting with Cheng and Demon. Mr. Tung issues a dire ultimatum: if Yiu is not handed over, he will launch a bombing campaign across Hong Kong. The terrorists raid the safe house when the location is compromised and the iris scan on Yiu is completed. A violent shootout breaks out between the police and the terrorists after Mr. Tung orders the terrorists, Cheng and Demon to eliminate Ching. Ching narrowly escapes and contacts Mr. Tung, explaining that the iris scan video sent to them was another virus. The video sent to Mr. Tung's team—appearing to show Yiu being captured—is revealed to be pre-recorded with a decoy posed as Yiu during the tunnel exchange and that the real Yiu Ho Yee is viewing their secrets as the terrorists who had been after Yiu were ambushed and eliminated. Furious, Mr. Tung demands for Yiu to be killed.

Soon after, the van transporting Yiu is attacked. Before being fatally shot on Mr. Tung's command, Yiu manages to disclose two critical pieces of information: Mr. Tung's true headquarters are in Hong Kong, not Spain, and the exact locations of the bombs. The police are able to locate and disarm the explosives and Mr. Tung is killed during the raid on his Hong Kong base.

Cheng catches up to Ching and helps him, having revealed he and Cheng had communicated via the Rubik's Cube to save Ching Ching. Demon pursues them via a car chase which they crash. Suffering a grave injury where Cheng tries to help him, Ching reveals Cheng's daughter has been saved and both men make amends before Demon catches up and shoots Cheng. They fight with Demon despite their grave injuries and manage to kill him by overpowering him and pushing him towards a bull charging at the trio. Demon is thrown against a tower by the bull and breaks his neck. Cheng and Ching dies from their injuries and Ching Ching is saved. The film ends with the police arresting moles and saving children from the terrorists.

== Cast ==
- Nick Cheung as CIB Chief Inspector Ching To
- Louis Koo as Security Wing Superintendent Cheng Chun Yin
- Francis Ng as CIB Superintendent Yip
- Jiang Peiyao as Journalist/Hacker Yiu Ho Yee
- Joe Ma as Commissioner of HK Police
- Huang Zhizhong as Mr. Tung, the leader of a terrorist group
- Benjamin Yuen as Ah John, Cheng's subordinate
- Joel Chan as Chief Superintendent Leung
- Zhang Yichi as Demon, Henchman of Mr. Tung
- Jacky Cai as Emma, Cheng's wife.
- Liu Yuning as Bill.

== Cameos ==
- Au Siu-wai as Businessman
- Grace Wong as CIB detective
- Kaman Kong as CIB detective
- Bowie Cheung as CIB detective
- Chloe Yuen as nanny of Superintendent Cheng's daughter
- Guillermo Larrayoz as Zaldiko

== Reception ==
The film has an 83% rating on Rotten Tomatoes based on six reviews.
