= Customs Frontline =

2024 Hong Kong film by Herman Yau

- Theatrical release poster
- Traditional Chinese: 海關戰線
- Simplified Chinese: 海关战线
- Hanyu Pinyin: Hǎi Guān Zhàn Xiàn
- Jyutping: Hoi2 Gwaan1 Zin3 Sin3
- Directed by: Herman Yau
- Screenplay by: Erica Lee; Eric Lee
- Produced by: Jason Siu
- Starring: Nicholas Tse; Jacky Cheung; Karena Lam; Cya Liu; Francis Ng
- Cinematography: Joe Chan
- Edited by: Azrael Chung
- Music by: Brother Hung
- Production companies: Emperor Film Production; Emperor Film and Entertainment (Beijing); Tianjin Yuewen Film and Television Culture Communication; New Classics Media Corporation; New Classics International Media
- Distributed by: Emperor Motion Pictures
- Release dates: 2 May 2024 (Far East Film Festival); 5 July 2024 (Hong Kong)
- Running time: 115 minutes
- Country: Hong Kong
- Languages: Cantonese; Mandarin; English; Thai; Arabic
- Box office: $19.9 million (Note: See Box office)

Customs Frontline (Chinese: 海關戰線), previously known as War Customised, is a 2024 Hong Kong action film directed by Herman Yau, featured an ensemble cast include Nicholas Tse, Jacky Cheung, Karena Lam, Cya Liu, and Francis Ng. Tse also served as the film's action director alongside Alan Ng. The film revolves around the Customs and Excise Department of Hong Kong.

Production for Customs Frontline began on 30 March 2022 and ended on 20 June 2022. The film made its world premiere as the closing film for Far East Film Festival 26 on 2 May 2024 before its theatrical release in Hong Kong on 5 July 2024.

== Plot ==
In the White Elephant Bay in East Africa, a fishing vessel belonging to fishermen from the Republic of Loklamoa becomes embroiled in a territorial dispute with a vessel from the Federal Republic of Hoyana. After Hoyanan customs forces open fire and kill all Loklamoan fishermen aboard, General Casa, commander of the Loklamoan military, vows retaliation and prepares for war. To strengthen his position, Casa secretly collaborates with Dr. Raw, a French weapons trafficker who operates an international smuggling network supplying advanced arms.

In Hong Kong, Customs officer Chow Ching-lai is widely respected for his discipline and integrity. He serves under senior superintendent Cheung Wan-nam alongside colleagues Brandon Lee, Ben, and his former girlfriend Katie. During a maritime patrol, the team intercepts an unmanned cargo vessel carrying a cache of highly lethal weapons. After a suspect dies from injuries sustained during the operation, Customs officials discover that the shipment may be linked to arms stolen from the Thai military. Director Chan Wing-kan assigns assistant commissioners Athena Siu and Kwok Chi-keung to investigate the case, with Athena cooperating with Interpol and Chi-keung oversees security of the confiscated weapons.

Athena later meets Interpol agents Mark and Ying from Thailand. Their investigation confirms that the weapons originated from the Thai armed forces. However, mercenaries employed by Raw attack the warehouse where the weapons are stored in an attempt to recover them. Numerous officers are killed during the firefight, including Katie. Devastated by her death, Ching-lai considers resigning, but Wan-nam persuades him to remain in service and promises to take responsibility for the incident. Unknown to Ching-lai, Wan-nam is struggling with severe bipolar disorder, causing Athena to worry about his mental condition.

The World Customs Organization and Interpol launch a joint international operation to recover the stolen weapons. Through Chi-keung's announcement, Lai and Ying was arranged by Wan-nam to travel to the Middle East to continue the investigation. In the Persian Gulf, they obtain intelligence from Leo, a notorious arms dealer, and discover that the Hong Kong shipping company KCS is connected to Raw's network, thus Ying begins to suspect the existence of a mole within Hong Kong Customs. The pair later travel to Loklamoa, where they witness military stockpiles connected to Casa before escaping as tensions between Hoyana and Loklamoa escalate into open conflict.

Acting on Ching-lai's intelligence, Athena and Wan-nam lead a raid on KCS. Company chairman Kam Wing, his son Kam Lok-man, and manager Au debate whether to cooperate with Customs despite fears of retaliation from Raw. Before they can act, Wing and several bodyguards die in a suspicious elevator accident. Wan-nam later approaches Lok-man at the funeral and secretly mails a coffee box to Athena. Meanwhile, Ching-lai and Ying return to Hong Kong, where Ying learns that Mark was killed during the earlier warehouse assault. Upon arriving at Customs headquarters, Ching-lai is shocked to discover that Wan-nam has committed suicide. While searching Wan-nam's belongings, Ching-lai uncovers a secret mobile phone containing evidence of cryptocurrency-funded property transactions linked to Wan-nam, forcing him to confront the possibility that his mentor was the mole.

At Raw's command, Leo and a group of mercenaries attack the Kam family in an attempt to silence them. Ching-lai and Ying intervene during the pursuit, rescuing the family after a violent vehicle chase and shootout. Customs forces led by Athena eventually secure the family's safety, but Ying is kidnapped by Leo. Under questioning, Lok-man reveals that Wan-nam had previously persuaded his father to hide the vessel KCS Moon and its weapons cargo at the Sunshine Shipyard instead of reporting it to Customs. Wan-nam had intended to protect KCS from Interpol scrutiny while maintaining leverage against Raw, but the plan collapsed after Raw's syndicate murdered Wing and drove him into despair. Meanwhile, Au was shot dead by Leo.

After locating the KCS Moon, Ching-lai and Athena launch a final assault to rescue Ying and dismantle the smuggling network. Leo and the mercenaries seize control of the vessel in an attempt to escape. Hong Kong Customs and the Special Duties Unit surround the ship with patrol boats and helicopters, leading to a fierce gun battle. During the confrontation, the smugglers shoot down a helicopter with an anti-tank weapon, though Ching-lai successfully boards the vessel alone. As the battle intensifies, the KCS Moon loses control and crashes into the harbour, triggering explosions from the hidden weapons cache before Brandon manages to halt the ship. Inside a flooded submarine bay beneath the vessel, Ching-lai rescues Ying and pursues Leo into a submarine attempting to flee. During an underwater struggle, Leo tries to activate a laser gyroscope system, but Ching-lai handcuffs himself to him and uses his superior breath-holding ability to defeat the exhausted smuggler, then he ultimately drags Leo back to shore alive to face justice.

Following his arrest, Leo asks why Ching-lai saved him, to which Ching-lai replies that it is the duty of a customs officer. The next morning, Ying departs Hong Kong to continue her work with Interpol, while Athena is promoted to deputy commissioner. After Wan-nam's funeral, Athena gives Ching-lai a key, a photograph of the KCS Moon, and a USB drive hidden inside the coffee box which Wan-nam mailed earlier. A farewell video recorded by Wan-nam reveals that he had indeed acted as the mole, motivated partly by a desire to secure a seaside home for Athena and help advance her career. He also confesses that guilt and worsening bipolar disorder drove him to suicide. In a flashback ending, Ching-lai recalled a conversation with Wan-nam by the sea in which he urged his mentor never to cross moral boundaries, while Wan-nam silently gazed into the distance, burdened by the consequences of his choices.

== Cast ==
- Nicholas Tse as Chow Ching-lai (周正禮), an assistant superintendent of the Customs and Excise Department.
- Jacky Cheung as Cheung Wan-nam (張允南), a senior superintendent of the Customs and Excise Department (Hong Kong) who has bipolar disorder.
- Karena Lam as Athena Siu (邵雅瑩), the assistant commissioner of Customs and Excise (intelligence and investigation) and Cheung's girlfriend.
- Cya Liu as Ying (阿盈), a Thai-Chinese intelligence officer from Interpol.
- Francis Ng as Kwok Chi-keung (郭子強), the assistant commissioner of Customs and Excise (boundary and ports) and Cheung's superior officer who often berates him.
- Michelle Yim as Mrs. Kam (甘太), Kam Wing's wife and Kam Lok-man's mother.
- Kenny Kwan as Brandon Lee (李學斌), a Customs officer who sometimes not fond of Chow.
- Ben Yuen as Au (區經理), the Kam family's butler.
- Carlos Chan as Kam Lok-man (甘樂文), Kam Wing's son who becomes a critical witness for the Customs and Excise Department.
- Michelle Wai as Katie, a customs officer and Chow's ex-girlfriend.
- Melvin Wong as Kam Wong (甘榮), CEO of KCS company who colludes with Dr. Raw to smuggle goods into Hong Kong which unbeknownst to him, turn out to be firearms.
- Shek Sau as Chan Wing-kan (陳永勤), the deputy commissioner of the Customs and Excise Department.
- Amanda Strang as Dr Raw, a notorious arms dealer and smuggler.
- Brahim Chab as Leo, a firearms smuggler.
- Angus Yeung as Ben, a Customs officer.
- James Kazama as Mark, a Thai intelligence officer from Interpol.
- Polly Lau as Mary, Kam Lok-man's wife.
- Cherlock Cheung as Marty, Kam Lok-man and Mary's son.
- Wade E. Solomon Cutler as General Casa, leader of Loklamoa's army.
- Chu Tin
- Kenneth Lai
- Jordan Merna
- Payne Roberts
- Guillaume Losguardi

== Production ==
News for the film first appeared on 20 February 2022 where it was announced that Herman Yau would be directing a film revolving around the Hong Kong Customs Department and is set to star Nicholas Tse and Cya Liu, with Tse also working as action director for the first time in the film. Tse's manager, Mani Fok confirmed the news and stated the film was in pre-production. The film was originally set to began production on 3 March 2022, but due to crew members testing positive for COVID-19, production commencement was postponed to three weeks later. On 21 March 2022, production company Emperor Motion Pictures promoted the film at the virtual Hong Kong International Film & TV Market (FILMART) and unveiled additional cast members including Jacky Cheung, Karena Lam and Francis Ng, who will be making a special appearance.

Principal photography for Customs Frontline began on 30 March 2022, where filming of an interior scene with Tse and Liu took place. On 6 April 2022, the film held its production commencement ceremony hosted by Emperor Motion Pictures chairman and executive producer Albert Yeung and attended by the cast and crew. The same day, filming of a warehouse raiding scene involving Cheung and Tse took place in Lau Fau Shan.

Production for Customs Frontline officially wrapped up on 20 June 2022, where a special banquet hosted by Yeung was held to congratulate the cast and crew for the film's completion.

== Release ==
Customs Frontline made its world premiere as the closing film for Far East Film Festival 26 on 2 May 2024. The film was scheduled to be theatrically released in Hong Kong on 5 July 2024.

== Reception ==
Customs Frontline has grossed US$1.6 million in Hong Kong, US$18.2 million in China, and $122,095 in the United States and Canada, for a worldwide total of US$19.9 million.

== Accolades ==
Year	Award	Category	Recipient(s)	Result	Ref.
2025	43rd Hong Kong Film Awards	Best Visual Effects	Wong Sum-yin, Lin Chun-yue Jules, Loki Ho, Yee Kwok-leung	Nominated	
