= Kathy Yuen =

Hong Kong actress

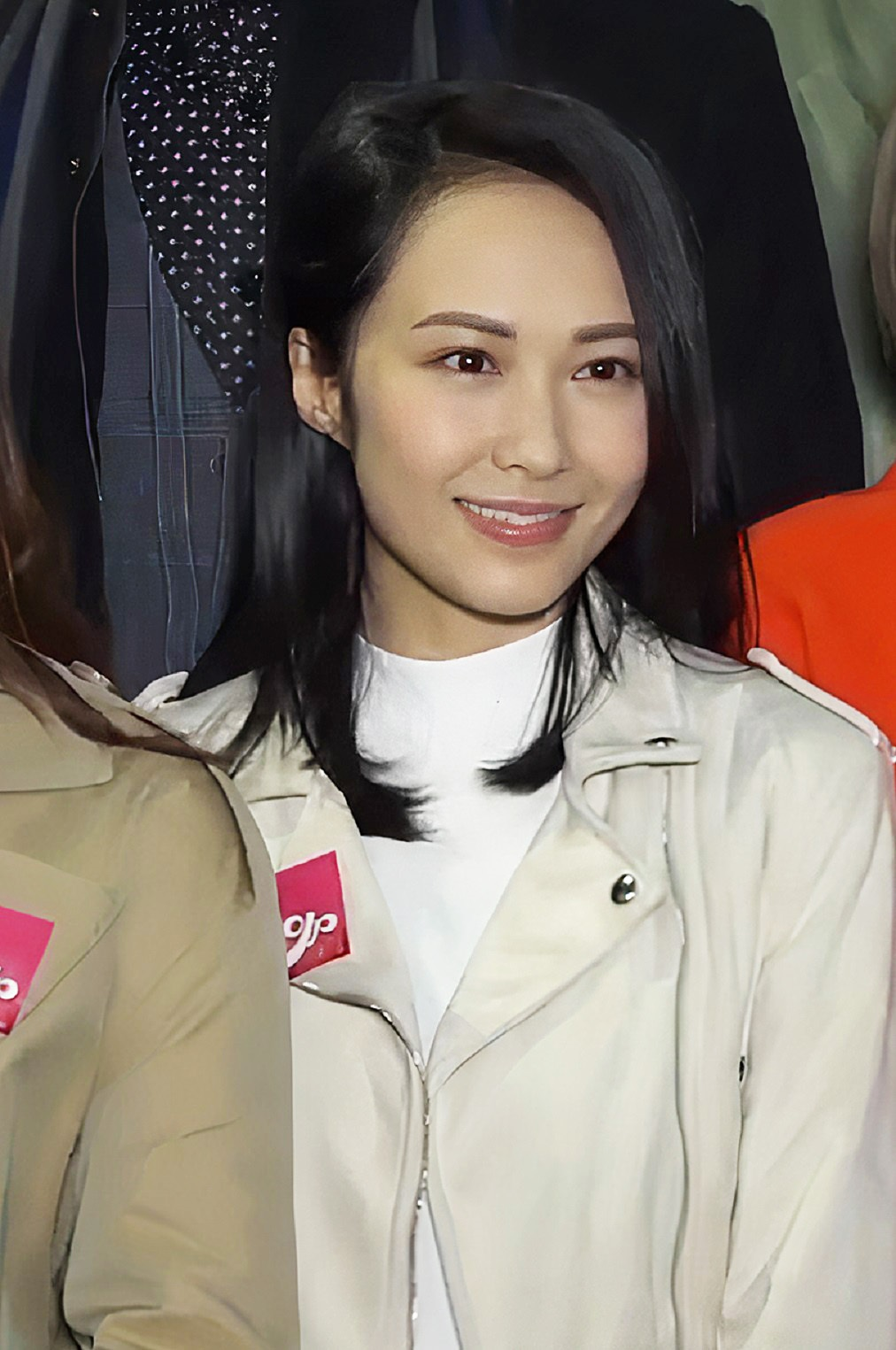
- Yuen in 2019
- Born: Yuen Ka-yee (袁家怡); 17 October 1987 (age 38); British Hong Kong
- Occupation: Actress
- Years active: 2006–present
- Spouse: Shing Mak (m. 2021)
- Partner: Ken Hung (2007–2018)
- Children: 1

Chinese name
- Traditional Chinese: 湯怡
- Simplified Chinese: 汤怡
Transcriptions
Standard Mandarin
- Hanyu Pinyin: Tāng Yí
Yue: Cantonese
- Jyutping: Tong^{1} Ji^{4}
- Hong Kong Romanisation: Tong Yee

Birth name
- Traditional Chinese: 袁家怡
- Simplified Chinese: 袁家怡
Transcriptions
Standard Mandarin
- Hanyu Pinyin: Yuán Jiāyí
Yue: Cantonese
- Jyutping: Jyun^{4} Gaa^{1}-ji^{4}
- Hong Kong Romanisation: Yuen Ka-yee
- Musical career
- Origin: Hong Kong
- Label: Emperor Entertainment Group
- Website: Kathy Yuen on EEG

Kathy Yuen (Chinese: 袁家怡, born 17 October 1987), better known as Tong Yee (Chinese: 湯怡), is an actress from Hong Kong. She is signed under the Emperor Entertainment Group label. She was cast in a supporting role in the Hong Kong variety show Beautiful Cooking in 2006 prior to focusing her career on being an actress. In 2021, Kathy announced her pregnancy and wedding with Shing Mak.

== Filmography ==
=== Film ===
Film
Year	English title	Chinese title	Role	Notes
2007	Simply Actors	戲王之王	Charmaine	
2008	Yes, I Can See Dead People	惡男事件	Mei Chee	
2008	La Lingerie	內衣少女	Celine	
2009	Shinjuku Incident	新宿事件	Shizuko	
2010	The Jade and the Pearl	翡翠明珠	Princess Yuen	
2010	Perfect Wedding	抱抱俏佳人	Vivian	
2012	Natural Born Lovers	天生愛情狂	Yee	
2012	Triad	紮職	Kathy	
2013	Keening Woman	哭喪女		
2013	A Secret Between Us	第一次不是你		
2015	The Merger	我們停戰吧!		
2016	The Mobfathers	選老頂		
2016	Cold War 2	寒戰II	Cecilia Lai	
2016	Drink Drank Drunk	三條友飲醉走		
2018	When Sun Meets Moon			
2018	Soul Studio			
2019	Integrity			
2019	Declared Legally Dead			
2019	Prison Flowers			
2022	Detective vs. Sleuths	神探大戰	Yeung Lai	

=== Television series ===
Year	English title	Chinese title	Role	Notes/Ref.
2007	Life Art	寫意人生	Yam Chi-wah (childhood)	
2011	Da Tang Nü Xun An	大唐女巡按	Zhu Yuexian	
2011	Secret History of Empress Wu	武則天秘史	Helan Minyue	
2012	Sign Language	手語隨想曲	mysterious girl	episode 7
2012	Gambler	賭海迷徒	Christy	
2014	The Borderline	警界線	Rachel	Guest star episode 11, 14, 16
2015	Incredible Mama	我阿媽係黑玫瑰	Anna / Angelina	
2015	The Menu	導火新聞線	Flora Lau	
2015	Love in Time	還來得及再愛你	Adelina	
2015	Doom +5	末日+5	Ceci	episode 3
2015	Night Shift	夜班	Aka	
2015	SFC 3	證義搜查線3		episode 5
2015	Paranormal Mind	開腦儆探	Tong Sui-yau	Guest star episode 10, 11, 12, 13
2016	Margaret and David: Green Beans	瑪嘉烈與大衛系列 綠豆		
2017	OCTB	反黑		
2020	Al Cappuccino	反黑路人甲	蘇芷珊	
2024	See Her Again	太阳星辰	Chung Yee	
