= Happily Ever After (2009 film) =

2009 Hong Kong film by Azrael Chung and Ivy Kong

- Directed by: Azrael Chung; Ivy Kong
- Written by: Philip Lui
- Produced by: Yap Kai Lyn
- Starring: Ken Hung; Michelle Wai; Carlos Chan
- Cinematography: Edmond Fung
- Edited by: Cheung Ka-Fai
- Production company: Emperor Motion Pictures
- Release date: 27 August 2009
- Running time: 92 minutes
- Country: Hong Kong
- Language: Cantonese

Happily Ever After (Chinese: 很想和你在一起) is a 2009 Hong Kong drama-romance film directed by Azrael Chung and Ivy Kong.

== Plot ==
Au-yeung Goon-nam (Michelle Wai) and Sze Tso-chi (Ken Hung) share the same birthday, go to the same school, love photography, and are just as competitive. But they did not know of each other's existence until they "crossed swords" at a debate tournament. And they both felt as if the fairytale prince and princess finally found each other. Later in a birthday party, Nam thought Chi played a trick on her, leaving a slap on his face. Four years later, Nam encounters his ghost and learns that he is already dead ...

== Cast ==
- Ken Hung – Sze Tso-chi
- Michelle Wai – Au-Yeung Goon-nam
- Carlos Chan – Chun Man
- Benz Hui
- Jacky Leung
- Gladys Fung
- A. Lin

== Critical reception ==
Perry Lam of Muse Magazine gave the film a mixed review, writing that 'it's a decent commercial entertainment designed to satisfy our residual, vulgar longing for the intensely romantic.'
