= The Kid from the Big Apple =

- Theatrical poster for the Singapore market
- Directed by: Jess Teong
- Starring: Ti Lung, Jessica Hsuan, Sarah Tan
- Production company: Three Production
- Distributed by: Three Production
- Release dates: 13 December 2015 (Macau International Movie Festival); 10 March 2016 (Malaysia and Singapore)
- Running time: 120 minutes
- Country: Malaysia
- Languages: Standard Chinese, Cantonese, English

The Kid from the Big Apple (Chinese: 我来自纽约) is a 2015 Malaysian film. The film stars Sarah Tan as Sarah, an 11-year-old girl from New York City who was forced to move to rural Malaysia to stay with her grandfather. The film garnered several awards at the 7th Macau International Movie Festival and the 28th Malaysian Film Festival.

== Plot ==
Sarah Lim reluctantly moves from New York City to Malaysia to stay with her grandfather Chun Gen, whom she had never met before as her mother went to China to resolve work-related problems. She relents on adapting to Chun Gen's traditional cultural practices, such as eating chicken feet, viewing the local community as disgusting. Despite the best efforts of her grandfather to re-create a familiar environment for Sarah by recreating western dishes that Sarah is familiar with local substitutes, Sarah only ate potato chips that she brought over from New York and refused to communicate with her Lim.

Lim turns to Ah Bao, a neighbour who claims to speak English, to translate his instructions in Mandarin Chinese and Cantonese to Sarah. Annoyed but later amused at his poor command of English, Sarah starts to take an interest in the surrounding neighbourhood. She also reveals that she can actually understand and speak Chinese, much to her Chun Gen's relief. Sarah gradually starts interacting with the children there, who include her in their activities, and starts adapting to the local environment as she communicates with Chun Gen. Sarah learns that her mother Sophia, unmarried yet pregnant with Sarah, had a strong argument with Chun Gen who was strongly against her moving to New York City to live with her boyfriend, disregarding his advice and ran away from home, never contacting Chun Gen until asking if Sarah can stay with him, pursuing a career as a fashion designer whilst balancing her role of a single mother after Sarah's father abandoned her.

Over time, the bond between Sarah and Lim deepened, despite occasional tension created by differences between her contemporary, social media-influenced lifestyle and her grandfather's conservative traditions. Sarah warms up to the community that as the time draws closer to her departure, she became more reluctant to leave. After learning that Chun Gen had hid his illnesses from everyone over the years, Sarah chooses to not leave him alone, pleading her grandfather to embrace new media so that she could communicate with him overseas and tried desperately to get Sophia and Chun Gen to reconcile.

Before Sarah's departure, Chun Gen has Ah Bao film a video to be sent to Sophia in case he dies, where he apologised for not being a good father, professing his admiration for Sophia raising Sarah single-handedly and also bequeathing his assets to her and Sarah. Ah Bao, defying his promise to keep the video secret, sends the video to Sophia. Touched by his words, Sophia hurriedly returns home and reconciles with her father after many years of estrangement. A montage shows Chun Gen flying back to New York together with Sarah and Sophia.

== Cast ==
- Sarah Tan Qin Lin (of Kampilan films) as Sarah Lim Si Jia
- Ti Lung as Lim Chun Gen, Sarah's grandfather
- Jessica Hsuan as Sophia Lin, Sarah's mother
- Jayson Tan as Ah Bao, Sarah's friend
- Lenna Lim as Ivy

== Themes ==
The director herself stated that The Kid from the Big Apple was about family values and wanted to convey the message of filial piety through the film. Specifically, she wanted to portray the importance of communication between grandparents and their grandchildren. The importance of father-daughter relationships is also conveyed in the film. Actress Sarah Tan said that "I think after watching this, you will think of home as well". For promoting family values, The Kid from the Big Apple won the Special Jury Awards at the 28th edition of the Malaysian Film Festival.

Teong also portrayed traditional Malaysian practices in this film as a reaction to her perception that the "actual (Malaysian traditional) culture and tradition is being forgotten and ignored, just for the sake of making profit". As such, the film was completely filmed in Malaysia and features traditional cultural practices, superstitions and dialects. However, the show was deliberately not "too Malaysian" as the director felt that the film had the potential for an overseas release.

== Production ==
The Kid from the Big Apple is the directorial debut of Jess Teong, who had previously worked in the entertainment industry as a singer, model, actress and film producer at various stages in her career. The film was conceived because Teong felt angry about the rampant over-reliance of smartphones and over-commercialization of local cultural practices in Malaysia after returning to Malaysia from an overseas work stint. Thus, the script of the movie was partly influenced by its director's own childhood experience.

After almost 2 years of searching for a suitable child actress to portray Sarah, she met Qin Lin, and felt that she was perfectly suited for this role. This was because Qin Lin had both met Teong's criteria such as "not being too technical with her acting" and had the appropriate personality for the role. However, Teong had to spend 2 months training Qin Lin to prepare her for her bilingual role. The role is Qin Lin's first role in a full-length feature film. She had previously made her acting debut on Astro Xiao Tai Yang in 2014.

Most of the scenes in The Kid from the Big Apple were filmed at an apartment block in Taman Yulek, Cheras, Kuala Lumpur.

== Release ==
The Kid from the Big Apple made its debut at the 7th Macau International Movie Festival in December 2015, where it won several film awards. The film made its cinematic debut in its home market of Malaysia and Singapore on 10 March 2016. It was subsequently released internationally in Taiwan and Hong Kong on 11 March 2016 and 21 April 2016 respectively.

== Reception ==
=== Critical response ===
The film received mixed reviews by film critics. The South China Morning Post gave the film a score of 3 out of 5, stating that "this movie is really less interested in conflicts than it is the feel-good, and ultimately cathartic, reconciliation process" and described it as a "fish-out-of-water comedy". However, it did praise the "heartfelt performances by both Ti and Tan" and said that "this poignant family reunion movie will delight its less sceptical viewers.".

Mypaper was more positive, describing the film as "heartwarming". It also praised the acting of the child actors, and in particular, Sarah's acting, which it described as "on point" and "quite touching". Jeremy Cheong, who wrote for Malaysia's The Sun newspaper, liked the film's "really good pacing and a nice mix of comedy, a little bit of action and heart-tugging moments" and also praised the cast, whose "great chemistry" he credited for helping to "make each scene feel more believable". However, he took issue with "the blatant hard-selling of a certain sponsor's product" which he felt "could have been avoided".

=== Accolades ===
Year	Award	Category	Result	Recipient
2015	7th Macau International Movie Festival	Golden Lotus Award for Best Actor	Won	Ti Lung
2015	7th Macau International Movie Festival	Golden Lotus Award for Best Supporting Actress	Won	Jessica Hsuan
2015	7th Macau International Movie Festival	Golden Lotus Award for Best Newcomer	Won	Tan Qi Ling
2015	7th Macau International Movie Festival	Golden Lotus Award for Best Writing	Won	Zhang Juexi
2016	28th Malaysian Film Festival	Best Child Actor	Won	Tan Qi Ling
2016	28th Malaysian Film Festival	Special Jury Awards	Won	The Kid from the Big Apple

== Sequel ==
A sequel, The Kid from the Big Apple 2, was released on 16 November 2017.
