= Love in Time =

Hong Kong television series

- Genre: Supernatural drama Romance
- Written by: Lam Siu-chi
- Directed by: Ben Fong
- Starring: Danson Tang; Michelle Wai; Terence Yin; Sherming Yiu; Charles Ying; Kathy Yuen; Carlos Chan; Rachel Lam; Wong Ho-ting; Bond Chan
- Country of origin: Hong Kong
- Original language: Cantonese
- No. of episodes: 9

Production
- Executive producer: Ricky Wong
- Production location: Hong Kong
- Running time: 60 minutes (Episode 1); 38–41 minutes
- Production company: Hong Kong Television Network

Original release
- Release: 2 June – 12 June 2015

Love in Time
- Traditional Chinese: 還來得及再愛你
- Simplified Chinese: 还来得及再爱你
- Literal meaning: "still have time to love you again"
Transcriptions
Standard Mandarin
- Hanyu Pinyin: Hái Lái Dé Jí Zài Ài Nǐ
Yue: Cantonese
- Jyutping: Waan4 Loi4 Dak1 Kap6 Zoi3 Oi3 Nei5

Love in Time (traditional Chinese: 還來得及再愛你; simplified Chinese: 还来得及再爱你) is a Hong Kong supernatural television drama produced by Ricky Wong's CTI, and is the company's first television drama since its establishment. The drama follows the love story between a cold 224-year-old vampire (Danson Tang) and a young human girl (Michelle Wai). A press conference was held on 9 May 2012.

The show had nine episodes. Love in Time was Hong Kong Television Network's 11th drama. It had English and Chinese subtitles when it aired in Singapore on Singtel.

== Cast ==
- Danson Tang as Roy Thackeray
- Michelle Wai as Lok Hei-lam
- Terence Yin as George Spenser
- Sherming Yiu as Koo Yuet Mei-loi
- Charles Ying as Ngai Sum
- Kathy Yuen as Angelina
- Carlos Chan as Max
- Rachel Lam as Man Sze-tung
- Wong Ho-ting as Heman
- Bond Chan as Marcus Morris, the series' only villain
- Chan On-ying as Mrs. Lok
- Kawaii Wong as Lee Chun-chun
- Cherry Pau as Chan Hiu-yan
- Nick Chong as Cheung Chi-keung
- Sin Ho-ying as Boss Ma
- Jeremy Luen as TX
- Wong Kwun-bun as Ken
- Alan Luk as Veterinary physician
- Oscar Li as Lam Kwok-ho
- Luvin Ho as Yip Yuk-ying
- Crystal Leung as Ching

== Plot ==
The story revolves around a kind-hearted vampire and a hardworking young woman who fall in love with each other.

== Marketing ==
A teaser for the television drama was posted on December 10, 2012. A 6-minute preview video clip was posted on YouTube on June 2, 2013.

== See also ==
- List of vampire television series
