= 7th Macau International Movie Festival =

2015 Chinese film awards ceremony

The 7th Macau International Movie Festival ceremony (simplified Chinese: 第七届澳门国际电影节; traditional Chinese: 第七屆澳門國際電影節), organized by the Macau Film and Television Media Association and China International Cultural Communication Center, honored the best films of 2015 in the Greater China Region and took place on 13 December 2015, in Macau.

Wolf Totem was the biggest winner, receiving three awards, including Best Picture, Best Director, and Best Cinematography.

== Winners and nominees ==
Best Picture: Wolf Totem – Jean-Jacques Annaud; 12 Citizens – Xu Ang; Ip Man 3 – Wilson Yip; Mr. Six – Guan Hu; Happiness – Yiu-fai Law	Best Director: Jean-Jacques Annaud – Wolf Totem; Guan Hu – Mr. Six; Dante Lam – To the Fore; Khan Lee – Dream Flight; Xu Ang – 12 Citizens
Best Actor: Ti Lung – The Kid from the Big Apple; Eddie Peng – To the Fore; Feng Xiaogang – Mr. Six; Donnie Yen – Ip Man 3; Francis Ng – Two Thumbs Up	Best Actress: Kara Hui – Happiness; Ann Hsu – Dream Flight; Wang Luodan – To the Fore; Irene Wan – Love in Late Autumn; Ariel Aisin-Gioro – See Your Voice
Best Supporting Actor: Carlos Chan – Happiness; Mike Tyson – Ip Man 3; Leo Ku – Two Thumbs Up; Zhang Hanyu – Mr. Six; Yan Weiwen – Fengyu Rishengchang	Best Supporting Actress: Jessica Hester Hsuan – The Kid from the Big Apple; Karena Ng – Ip Man 3; Nana Ou-yang – To the Fore; Gigi Leung – Wong Ka Yan; Xu Qing – Mr. Six
Best Writing: The Kid from the Big Apple – Jess Teong; Happiness – Yiu-Fai Law; Qinghai Lake – Qin Yi; Two Thumbs Up – Ho Leung Lau; Ip Man 3 – Edmond Wong	Best Cinematography: Wolf Totem – Jean-Marie Dreujou; Mr. Six – Luo Pan; To the Fore – Chan Chor Keung; Ip Man 3 – Kenny TSE Chung-to; See Your Voice – Billy Lee
Best Newcomer: Sarah Tan – The Kid from the Big Apple	Best Animated Feature Film: The Jewish Girl in Shanghai
Outstanding Motion Picture Production Award: See Your Voice	Best Film Producer: Shi Jianxiang
Chinese Film Outstanding Contribution Award: Qin Yi	Chinese Performing Arts Outstanding Achievement Award: Li Xuejian

== Extra Awards ==
- Best Animated Feature Film (最佳动画片奖)
- Outstanding Motion Picture Production Award (优秀动物电影制作奖)
- Best Film Producer (最佳电影制片人)
- Chinese Film Outstanding Contribution Award (中国电影杰出贡献奖)
- Chinese Performing Arts Outstanding Achievement Award (华语表演艺术杰出成就奖)
