= Carlos Chan (actor) =

Hong Kong actor (born 1986)

- 陳家樂
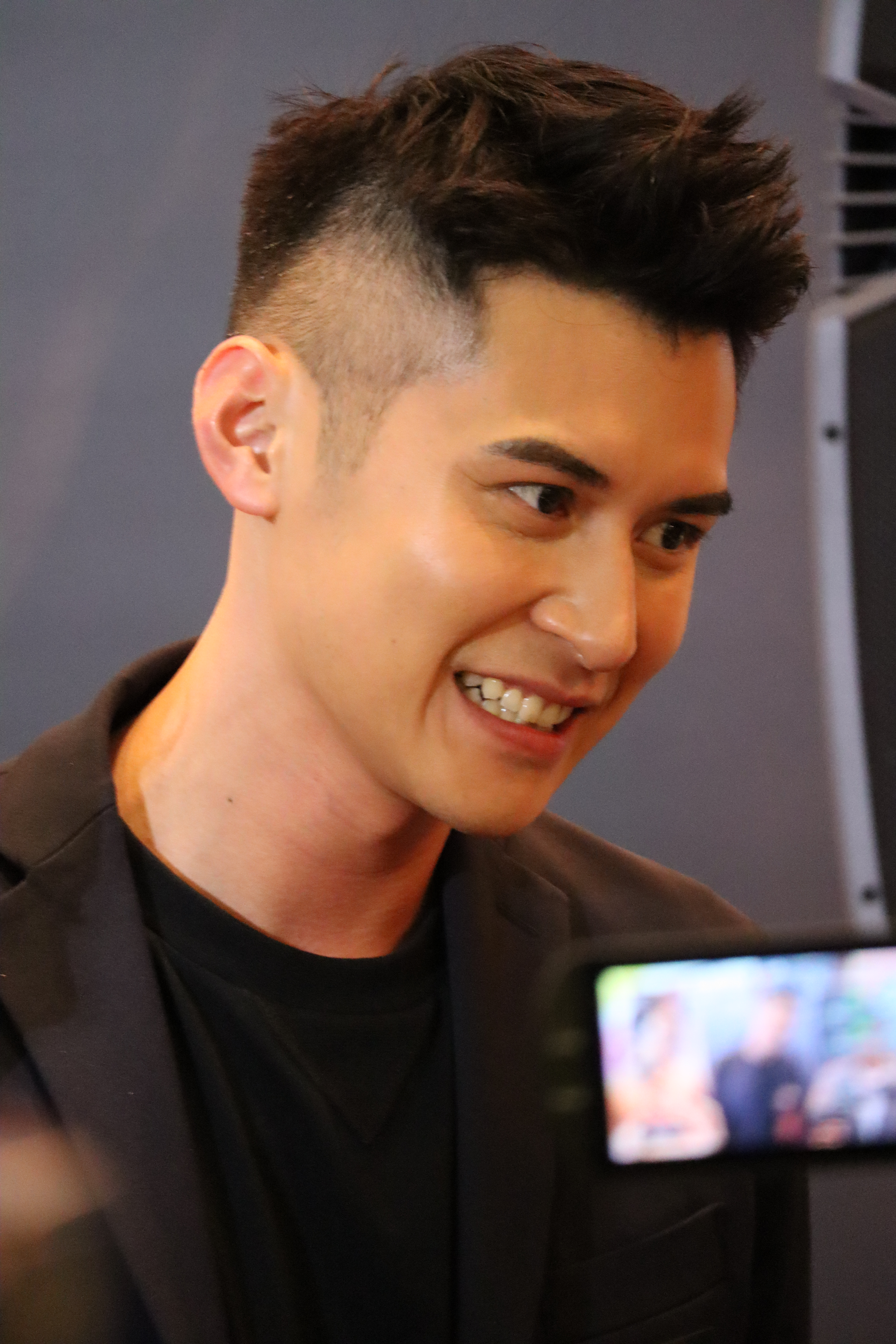
- Chan in June 2018
- Born: Chan Ka-lok; 12 October 1986 (age 40); Hong Kong
- Occupation: Actor
- Years active: 2008–present
- Spouse: Shiga Lin (m. 2023)
- Children: 1

Carlos Chan Ka-lok (Chinese: 陳家樂; born 12 October 1986) is a Hong Kong actor. Discovered by Emperor Entertainment Group through a singing contest, Chan initially signed as a singer. He made his onscreen debut with a minor role in Connected (2008), and went on to star in various productions in small parts. He later joined the television productions of the newly founded HKTV, where he gained recognition for his lead role as Chung Lok-tin in Incredible Mama (2015). He also portrayed the main villain in Dante Lam's sports film To the Fore (2015), and received his breakout role as Chan Kai-yuk, the sole male lead in the film Happiness (2016), for which he won Best Supporting Actor in the 7th Golden Lotus Awards.

Following his breakthrough performance, Chan starred in the TVB series Daddy Cool (2018) as the lead and titular character, and appeared in the web series The Trading Floor (2018), which earned him Best Newcomer in the 24th Huading Awards. He also began to take on lead roles in romance films, most notably in Ready o/r Knot (2021) and its sequel Ready or Rot (2023), and appeared in supporting roles in crime thriller films, including The White Storm 2: Drug Lords (2019), Bodies at Rest (2019), Detective vs Sleuths (2022), and The Goldfinger (2023). In 2026, Chan was nominated for Best Actor with Someone Like Me (2025) in the 44th Hong Kong Film Awards.

== Biography ==
Chan was born on 12 October 1986. He lived with his grandmother from birth until he reached the fifth year of primary school. Chan began filming several advertisements between the ages of four and five. He later attended Ma On Shan Tsung Tsin Secondary School. In 2003, two years after graduating, he participated in a rookie singing contest hosted by Emperor Entertainment Group. Although he was eliminated in the round of sixteen, he was offered a contract as an artist with Emperor. Initially assigned to join the boy group Boy'z, Chan's lack of interest in dancing and consistent skipping of training sessions led to his removal from the group. He was then given a few film roles by the artist agency, including a minor role as the younger brother of Barbie Hsu's character in the 2008 film Connected. Despite having only one scene in the initial script, his role was expanded by Benny Chan after being impressed by his performance. Chan also gained recognition for his role in the 2008 TVB television series Dressage To Win. In 2009, Chan starred in the romance film Happily Ever After. However, due to his constant improvisation on set and failure to adhere to the script, he faced industry blacklisting and did not receive any roles for the following three years. In 2012, director Heiward Mak approached Chan after previously discussing his visions in films and offered him a lead role in the drama film Diva. While Chan had considered leaving the entertainment industry and pursuing a career in insurance by that time, Mak encouraged him to continue his passion for acting. Chan then decided to join Emperor Entertainment Group's newly-formed film department. In 2015, he landed several roles in the recently established HKTV, including his lead role as Chung Lok-tin in Incredible Mama and supporting lead role as Max in Love in Time. He also portrayed the main villain, Simon, in Dante Lam's sports film To the Fore, during which he severely injured his left clavicle. Despite the injury, he convinced the production crew that he could continue filming and was allowed to return.

Chan's breakout role came in 2016 when he starred as Chan Kai-yuk, a temperamental young man from Guangzhou searching for his father in Hong Kong, in the romance film Happiness alongside Kara Wai. His performance earned him Best Supporting Actor in the 7th Golden Lotus Awards. Following the breakthrough performance, Chan received more role offers, including the lead role in the 2018 musical biographical film House of the Rising Sons. In the same year, he was invited by Amy Wong to star as Chung Ding Kwok, a co-leading role with Wayne Lai and David Chiang, in the TVB mystery fantasy series Daddy Cool, further solidifying his public recognition. He also had a supporting lead role in the business-themed mystery web series The Trading Floor, which earned him a nomination for Best Newcomer in the 24th Huading Awards. In 2019, Chan took on the lead role of Jack Yau, a police officer in a relationship with his Dressage to Win co-star Michelle Wai, in the action thriller film The White Storm 2: Drug Lords. He also had supporting roles in the action thriller films Integrity and Bodies at Rest. In 2020, Chan was cast in a lead role in Patrick Kong's romance film You Are the One, and as Yip Wing Shun, the sole male lead, in the mystery thriller film Declared Legally Dead, for which he was nominated for Best Actor in the 12th Golden Lotus Awards. He also had a supporting lead role in Dante Lam's action film The Rescue.

In 2021, Chan starred as Guy, the male lead in the romantic comedy film Ready o/r Knot, once again alongside Michelle Wai. The duo portrayed a pair of lovers about to get married, yet each with their own hesitations. He also took on the lead role of Ho Hok Ming in the mystery thriller film The Attorney, and made brief appearances as Donnie Yen's character's supervisor and Adam Cheng in the action thriller film Raging Fire and the biographical film Anita respectively. Chan was cast in a supporting role in the 2022 crime thriller film Detective vs Sleuths, and appeared in main roles in the 2023 action films Echoes Of The Thunder and The Brotherhood Of Rebel. He also reprised his role as Guy in Ready or Rot, the sequel of Ready o/r Knot, and appeared in a supporting role in the crime thriller film The Goldfinger in the same year. In 2025, Chan played Ken, a man who develops a romantic relationship with Mui (played by Fish Liew), who has cerebral palsy, in the film Someone Like Me, for which he was nominated for Best Actor in the 32nd Hong Kong Film Critics Society Awards and Best Actor in the 44th Hong Kong Film Awards.

== Personal life ==
Chan began dating actress Jennifer Yu after their collaboration in the 2014 television series A Dream Comes True 2014. Although Chan mentioned plans of marriage in an interview with Ming Pao in March 2018, he announced their breakup in June after three years of being in a relationship.

In 2020, Chan was rumored to be in a relationship with singer Shiga Lin after filming a TVB traveling program the previous year. In June 2022, Chan confirmed his two-year relationship with Lin and announced their engagement. The couple married in April 2023. In July 2024, the couple announced the birth of a daughter named Camila.

== Filmography ==
=== Film ===
| Year | Title | Role | Notes |
|---|---|---|---|
| 2008 | Connected | Roy Wong (王偉健) | |
| 2009 | Happily Ever After | Lo Chun Man (盧俊文) | |
| 2009 | Split Second Murders | Victim | |
| 2011 | Hi, Fidelity | Tony | |
| 2012 | Diva | Lok (樂) | |
| 2013 | When C goes with G7 | Dik (迪) | |
| 2015 | 12 Golden Ducks | Kwan (阿關) | |
| 2015 | To the Fore | Simon Chan (陳偉文) | |
| 2016 | The Mobfathers | Xu's subordinate | |
| 2016 | Happiness | Chan Kai-yuk (陳介旭) | |
| 2018 | House of the Rising Sons | Kin (阿健) | |
| 2018 | Smallfoot | Migo | Cantonese voice dub |
| 2019 | Integrity | Gary | |
| 2019 | The White Storm 2: Drug Lords | Jack Yau (丘世鴻) | |
| 2019 | Bodies at Rest | Elf | |
| 2020 | You Are the One | Ma Fan (馬奮) | |
| 2020 | Declared Legally Dead | Yip Wing Shun (葉永信) | |
| 2020 | The Rescue | Lin Weiquan (李偉泉) | |
| 2021 | Ready o/r Knot | Guy (阿佳) | |
| 2021 | All U Need Is Love | Manager of Grande Hotel | |
| 2021 | The Attorney | Ho Hok Ming (何學銘) | |
| 2021 | Raging Fire | Ha Chi-ming (夏智明) | Cameo |
| 2021 | Anita | Adam Cheng | |
| 2022 | Detective vs Sleuths | Tsai Ka-chu (齊家柱) | |
| 2023 | Echoes Of The Thunder | Li Wai Kwok (李偉國) | |
| 2023 | The Brotherhood Of Rebel | Kam (金仔) | |
| 2023 | Ready or Rot | Guy | |
| 2023 | The Goldfinger | Ho Ho Wan (何浩雲) | |
| 2024 | We Are Family | Kwok Ka Chung (郭家聰) | |
| 2024 | Customs Frontline | Kam Lok Man (甘樂文) | |
| 2025 | Queen of Mahjong | Tony (千紅哥) | |
| 2025 | Someone Like Me | Ken (阿健) | |
| 2026 | Cold War 1994 † | Wong Ka-fai (黃嘉輝) | |

=== Television ===
| Year | Title | Role | Notes |
|---|---|---|---|
| 2008 | Dressage To Win | Nel | Main role |
| 2014 | A Dream Comes True 2014 | Lai Dai Chi (黎大志) | Main role |
| 2015 | Incredible Mama | Chung Lok-tin (鍾樂田) | Main role |
| 2015 | The Menu | Choi Wing Ho (蔡詠豪) | Guest role |
| 2015 | Love in Time | Max | Main role |
| 2015 | Hidden Faces | Kenny | Recurring role |
| 2018 | Daddy Cool | Chung Ding Kwok (鍾定國) | Main role |
| 2018 | The Trading Floor | BJ | Main role |
| 2019 | ICAC Investigators 2019 | Au-yeung Chi (歐陽智) | Main role |
| 2021 | The Line Watchers | Chan Ka Hing (陳家興) | Main role |
| 2022 | Forensic JD | Ching Chin-bok (程展博) | Main role |
| 2024 | Call of Destiny | Jason Fong Yat-chun | Main role |

== Awards and nominations ==
| Year | Award | Category | Work | Result | Ref. |
|---|---|---|---|---|---|
| 2015 | 7th Golden Lotus Awards | Best Supporting Actor | Happiness | Won | |
| 2018 | 24th Huading Awards | Best Newcomer | The Trading Floor | Won | |
| 2020 | 12th Golden Lotus Awards | Best Actor | Declared Legally Dead | Nominated | |
| 2026 | 32nd Hong Kong Film Critics Society Awards | Best Actor | Someone Like Me | Nominated | |
| 2026 | 44th Hong Kong Film Awards | Best Actor | Someone Like Me | Nominated | |
