= Da Tang Nü Xun An =

- Poster
- Also known as: Policewoman in Tang Dynasty; Tang Dynasty Inspector
- 大唐女巡按
- Genre: Costume drama; Detective fiction; Mystery
- Written by: Zang Li
- Directed by: Tao Lingling
- Starring: Gillian Chung; Benny Chan; Wang Ji; Wan Ni'en; Lei Mu; Wu Jingjing; Qian Yongchen; Dong Qing; Kathy Yuen
- Opening theme: "Grand" (浩然) by Benny Chan, Liu Xiaoxue and Guan Haizhong
- Ending theme: "Layered Mountains and Winding Rivers" (山重水又复) by Gillian Chung
- Country of origin: China
- Original language: Mandarin
- No. of episodes: 30

Production
- Producer: You Xiaogang
- Production locations: Wuxi; Hengdian World Studios; Beijing
- Running time: ≈45 minutes per episode
- Production company: Beijing Jingdu Century Cultural Development

Original release
- Network: Dragon Television
- Release: 7 July 2011

Da Tang Nü Xun An (大唐女巡按; "Female Inspector of the Great Tang") is a Chinese television series about Xie Yaohuan (谢瑶环), a fictional Tang dynasty female detective who solves several mysterious cases during the reign of the female emperor Wu Zetian. Directed by Tao Lingling, the series starred Gillian Chung, Benny Chan, Wan Ni'en, Lei Mu, Wu Jingjing, Wang Ji, Qian Yongchen, Kathy Yuen and Dong Qing. The series was first broadcast on Dragon Television on 7 July 2011 in mainland China.

== Cast ==
- Gillian Chung as Xie Yaohuan
- Benny Chan as Lian Tingfei
- Wang Ji as Wu Zetian
- Wan Ni'en as Tang Min
- Lei Mu as Qin Ming
- Kathy Yuen as Zhu Yuexian
- Ye Zuxin as Ouyang Tianming
- Wu Jingjing as Caidie
- Qian Yongchen as Sha Hengtian
- Chen Ye as Yuguan / Yulang
- Don Li as Han Shi
- Huang Juan as Princess Taiping
- Dong Qing as Xiaofoye
- Ji Chenmu as Manager Liu
- Zhou Jingfeng as Hou Baobao
- Li Qingdai as Hu Guan

== Broadcasts ==
Region	Network	Dates	Timings
Mainland China	Dragon TV	7 July 2011	19:00 on weekdays
Mainland China	Chongqing TV	19 July 2011	19:30 on weekdays
Mainland China	Liaoning TV	27 July 2011	20:05 on weekdays
Mainland China	Nanning TV	28 August 2011	20:35 on weekdays
Hong Kong	Now TV	December 2012	
Mainland China	Hubei TV	24 January 2012	23:24 daily
Mainland China	Chengdu TV	1 March 2012	09:17 daily

=== Re-broadcasts ===
Region	Network	Dates	Timings
Mainland China	Dragon TV	7 January 2012	12:45 on weekdays

== See also ==
- The Shadow of Empress Wu
