= The Mobfathers =

2016 Hong Kong film by Herman Yau

- Film poster
- Traditional Chinese: 選老頂
- Simplified Chinese: 选老顶
- Hanyu Pinyin: Xuǎn Lǎo Dǐng
- Jyutping: Syun2 Lou2 Ding2
- Directed by: Herman Yau
- Screenplay by: Erica Li
- Produced by: Chapman To
- Starring: Chapman To; Gregory Wong; Philip Keung; Anthony Wong
- Cinematography: Joe Chan
- Edited by: Azrael Chung
- Music by: Mak Chun Hung
- Production company: HK Film
- Distributed by: Golden Scene
- Release dates: 23 March 2016 (HKIFF); 31 March 2016 (Hong Kong)
- Running time: 94 minutes
- Country: Hong Kong
- Language: Cantonese
- Box office: HK$6,384,789

The Mobfathers is a 2016 Hong Kong crime film directed by Herman Yau, produced by and starring Chapman To. The film co-stars Gregory Wong and Philip Keung, with a guest appearance by Anthony Wong. The Mobfathers made its world premiere at the 40th Hong Kong International Film Festival on 23 March 2016 and was theatrically released in Hong Kong on 31 March.

== Synopsis ==
Every three years, the five leading gangs elect a representative to stand for election to be the Mobfather of the underworld. Each of the candidates has his strengths and his weaknesses, and there is understandably a decided lack of trust amongst the gangs. Each fighting for his gang's own vested interests. The Mobfather looks to two of his lieutenants to take over for him when he learns he is dying. In the end the two chosen candidates, Chuck and Wulf, killed each other in a gang fight. The movie ends with Chuck narrating how the Mobfather died.

== Cast ==
- Chapman To as Chuck
- Gregory Wong as Wulf
- Philip Keung as Luke
- Anthony Wong as Mobfather (guest appearance)
- Bonnie Sin as Chuck's wife
- Carlos Chan as police
- Danny Summer as uncle Sky
- Lee Lung-kei as uncle Earth
- Albert Cheung as uncle Man
- Ken Hung as Wulf's men
- Deep Ng as Coffee
- Kenny Wong as Superintendent Xu
- Tony Ho as Coke
- Kathy Yuen as Mobfather's female companion & driver
- Wylie Chu as General
- Benson Ling as Chuck's men
- Leander Lau as Chuck junior
- Tarah Chan as Coco

== Trailer ==
The first trailer was released by Golden Scene HK's YouTube channel on 3 March 2016.
