= Full Strike =

2015 Hong Kong film by Derek Kwok and Henri Wong

- Film poster
- Directed by: Derek Kwok; Henri Wong
- Screenplay by: Derek Kwok; Henri Wong; Joe Chien; Yim Ka-yee; Yan Pak-wing
- Produced by: Conroy Chan; Tang Wai-but; Weldon Fung; Peter Fung
- Starring: Josie Ho; Ekin Cheng; Ronald Cheng; Tse Kwan-ho; Andrew Lam; Edmond Leung; Wilfred Lau; Siu Yam-yam; Eric Kwok
- Cinematography: Jason Kwan
- Edited by: Matthew Hui
- Music by: Yusuke Hatano
- Production companies: 852 Films; Big Honor Entertainment; Inlook Vision; Fox International Channels; Why Entertainment; Xamax Development; StArt Entertainment and Production; Salon Films
- Distributed by: Gala Film Distribution (Hong Kong); Distribution Workshop (Worldwide)
- Release dates: 13 March 2015 (Osaka Asian Film Festival); 7 May 2015 (Hong Kong)
- Running time: 108 minutes
- Country: Hong Kong
- Language: Cantonese
- Budget: HK$30 million
- Box office: HK$12.2 million

Full Strike (Chinese: 全力扣殺) is a 2015 Hong Kong sports comedy film directed by Derek Kwok and Henri Wong. The film was released on 7 May 2015.

== Cast ==
- Josie Ho as Ng Kau-sau (aka Beast Ng)
- Ekin Cheng as Lau Dan
- Ronald Cheng as Ng Kau-cheung (aka Suck Nipple Cheung)
- Tse Kwan-ho as Ng Kau-chun
- Andrew Lam as Champion Chik
- Edmond Leung as Lam Chiu
- Wilfred Lau as Ma Kun
- Siu Yam-yam as Grandma Mui
- Eric Kwok as Wong Lung-wai

=== Guest appearance ===
- Grace Yip as Fung
- Michael Tse as Inspector Cheung
- Philip Keung as Brother Crazy Dog
- JBS@24HERBS as Gangster
- Phat Chan@24HERBS as Police League' Team
- Kit Leung@24HERBS as Police League' Team
- Stephanie Che as Madam
- Jo Kuk as Police officer
- Vincent Kok as Police League' Team
- Matt Chow as Benny Yiu
- Calvin Choi as other team players
- Edward Huang as other team players
- Helen To as Audience
- Bao Chunlai as himself
- Wang Lin as herself
- Yang Di as Alien
- Bob Lam as Anchor
- Kabby Hui as Anchor
- Harriet Yeung as Lancy Lam

== Box office ==
As of 3 June 2015, the film has grossed a total of HK$12.2 million at the Hong Kong box office after four weekends.
