= Connected (2008 film) =

2008 Hong Kong film by Benny Chan

- Taiwanese theatrical release poster
- Directed by: Benny Chan
- Screenplay by: Alan Yuen; Benny Chan; Xu Bing
- Story by: Larry Cohen
- Based on: Cellular by Chris Morgan
- Produced by: Benny Chan; Albert Lee; Jiang Tao; Kevin Yung
- Starring: Louis Koo; Barbie Hsu; Nick Cheung; Liu Ye
- Cinematography: Anthony Pun
- Edited by: Yau Chi-wai
- Music by: Nicolas Errèra
- Production companies: Emperor Motion Pictures; China Film Group; Warner China Film HG; Armor Entertainment; Sirius Pictures International
- Distributed by: Emperor Motion Pictures
- Release date: 25 September 2008
- Running time: 110 minutes
- Countries: Hong Kong; China
- Languages: Cantonese; Mandarin
- Budget: HK$45 million
- Box office: HK$13.64 million

Connected (traditional Chinese: 保持通話; simplified Chinese: 保持通话) is a 2008 Hong Kong action film, and a remake of the 2004 American film Cellular co-written, produced and directed by Benny Chan. The film stars Louis Koo, Barbie Hsu, Nick Cheung, and Liu Ye. Connected tells the story of Bob (Koo), a single father who receives a distressing phone call on his cellular phone from Grace Wong (Hsu), a woman who has been kidnapped by a gang of corrupt Interpol agents who have a hidden agenda.

The film began development at Warner China Film HG, the Chinese production arm of Warner Bros., who felt that a remake of Cellular would reach out to Hong Kong's cell phone user population, and decided to hire Benny Chan to develop a screenplay for the film. Chan and his screenwriters spent two years working on the script. For Connected, Chan wanted to improve on the previous film by making the characters and the situations in his remake seem more believable. Principal photography took place in Hong Kong.

Connected was released in Hong Kong on 25 September 2008.

== Plot ==
While Grace Wong is driving her vehicle, her car is knocked down by another vehicle and she is abducted from the scene. The kidnappers, led by Fok Tak-nang, return to Grace's house, where they kill her maid, and start searching the place. Grace is then taken to an abandoned house, where she manages to repair a destroyed telephone. With the phone, she manages to contact Bob, a single father and debt collector. Bob has promised his son, Kit-kit, and his sister, Jeannie, that he will meet them at an airport, before Kit-kit boards a flight to Australia.

While talking to Grace on his cellular phone, Bob agrees to help Grace and hands his phone to patrol officer Fai, who believes that the distressing phone call is a prank, due to Bob's reckless driving. Grace is interrupted from the call when Fok and his men enter the room, having abducted her brother's friend, Joe. Fok forces Grace to contact her brother, Roy. After listening to Roy's answering machine, Fok kills Joe and leaves with his men, now planning to go after Grace's daughter, Tinker. Grace persuades Bob to head to the school and find her daughter before Fok's men do. When Bob arrives, he is distracted by the school's headmaster, and minutes before the school's class dismissal, he finds Tinker too late, when she is abducted by Fok's men. Bob goes after the abductors, but winds up losing sight of them in the struggle. After crashing through a truck, Bob later finds a handgun left in his car by a fellow debt collector.

Realizing that his phone has a low battery, Bob heads to a phone store to buy a cell phone charger. After losing his patience with the flirty service clerk, he holds the store at gunpoint and pays for the charger. After Bob is caught on camera at both the school and the phone store, Fai heads to Grace Wong's residence. He is still convinced that the kidnapping situation is a prank, having talked to Michelle, a woman impersonating Grace. Fok then decides to go after Grace's brother, Roy, who is in a hospital.

Fai decides to call Grace's house, after realizing the real Grace Wong is a Mandarin-language speaker, while the impersonator he met speaks Cantonese. At the hospital, Bob manages to distract Grace's abductors, who are revealed by police to be Interpol agents. The agents, however, succeed in kidnapping Roy and take him to a hill where he has hidden a camcorder. Bob intervenes, grabbing a hold of the camera and fleeing from the agents; unfortunately, he loses connection with Grace.

Fai heads to Grace's house, where he confronts and kills Michelle, realizing she was also an Interpol agent working for Fok. As Grace tries to contact Bob, she is caught by one Fok's henchmen. Grace kills the henchman and manages to find her daughter. However, while planning to escape, Grace and Tinker are caught by Fok. Bob looks at the evidence on the camcorder. The footage, captured by Roy, reveals Fok brutally executing several American drug dealers and stealing their contraband, exposing them all as dirty cops. Bob calls Fok, and tells them to meet him at the airport in an exchange for the evidence and the hostages, while attempting to keep his promise to his son.

At the airport, Bob's plans to meet his sister and son are foiled as Fok conveniently stands between them and Bob's hiding place. After telling Fok to go towards the parking lot, he demands that Grace, Roy and Tinker be released. They flee to a patrol car that is also in the lot. Unfortunately, Bob is caught by Fok and his men, and fights against them until Fai catches up to them. Fok and his men are arrested by Detective Cheung and his Serious Crimes Unit. After Bob hands the videotaped evidence over to Detective Cheung, Fok and Tong, one of Fok's henchman, appear, and Cheung reveals that he was working with Fok. Fok deletes the footage on the videotape, and a violent confrontation ensues in a loading dock in the airport where Fai and Bob take on Fok, Cheung and the corrupt Interpol agents. Cheung is shot to death by Fai after attacking the patrol officer with a forklift truck.

Bob confronts Fok on a scaffolding. After Bob reveals he still has videotaped evidence on his cell phone and threatens to send it to the police, Fok kicks Bob off the scaffolding. A net manages to save Bob's fall, but sends Fok falling to his death. While this was going on, a member of Fok's team rekidnaps Grace and her family and prepares to kill them, but Grace manages to defend her family long enough for the police to arrive. When Bob returns, Fai talks to him, feeling the glory he once had as a police officer, and wishing that they never meet again after their ordeal. Bob then meets Grace for the first time in person. Grace thanks him, and Bob concludes their meeting by saying, "If you're gonna call for help, no thanks! If you want dinner, then I'll consider." Bob is then reunited with his son, who is happy that his father kept his promise.

== Cast ==
- Louis Koo (古天樂) as Bob, the male protagonist who is a debt collector, and single father whose life has fallen apart after his wife leaves him and her son behind. After a successful, previous collaboration with the 2006 film Rob-B-Hood, Koo was director Benny Chan’s first choice to play the role of Bob, a role the actor described as the most difficult in the film.
- Barbie Hsu (徐熙媛) as Grace Wong, the female protagonist who is kidnapped. Grace is a widowed single mother, who owns a successful toy designing company. Hsu, a Taiwanese actress who appears in her first Hong Kong film, expressed her interest on her character overcoming her vulnerability: "The character I play is a victim throughout. After being kidnapped and imprisoned, she even has to witness someone being killed. It’s all very frightening. Yet, I like this character a lot because she manages to piece together a shattered phone to make a call, under such difficult circumstances."
- Nick Cheung (張家輝) as Sergeant Yu Chan-fai, a low-ranking patrol officer who was formerly an inspector in Hong Kong's Serious Crime Division.
- Liu Ye (劉燁) as Senior Inspector Fok Tak-nang, the main antagonist who is a corrupt Interpol agent with a hidden agenda.
- Eddie Cheung (張兆輝) plays Detective Cheung, Fai's former subordinate who is now an inspector of the Serious Crime Division.
- Flora Chan (陳慧珊) as Jeannie, Bob's older sister, who is looking after Bob's son before he boards a flight to Australia.
- Louis Fan (樊少皇) as Tong, an Interpol agent who serves as one of Fok's henchman.
- Carlos Chan (陳家樂) as Roy Wong, Grace's brother, who witnesses Fok robbing the drug dealers on video.

Other players include Ken Hung as Joe, Roy's classmate, who is murdered by Fok; Vincent Kok as a man whose convertible is taken by Bob; Mainland Chinese actress Gong Beibi cameos as Jen, Fai's wife; German-born Asian actress Ankie Beilke plays Michelle, an Interpol agent pretending to be Grace Wong as a cover-up for the kidnapping; Wong Cho-lam appears as a salesman; Raymond Wong Ho-yin cameos as a leader of a special force senior officer who shoots Interpol agent to save Grace Wong and her families; child actress Chan Sze-wai plays Tinker Wong, Grace's daughter; child actor Presley Tam, who appeared as a school bus child in Benny Chan's Invisible Target plays Kit-kit, Bob's son; and American actors Robbin Harris, David Rock, and Daniel Whyte appear as Interpol agents working for Inspector Fok.

== Production ==
Connected is a remake of the 2004 American thriller Cellular, which starred Kim Basinger, Chris Evans, Jason Statham and William H. Macy. It is also the first film to be produced by Benny Chan's production company Sirius Pictures International. Connected is a Hong Kong-Chinese co-production; it was produced by Hong Kong's Emperor Motion Pictures, and Warner China Film HG, a joint venture between Warner Bros. and China Film Group.

The film was produced and directed by Benny Chan, and stars Louis Koo in the lead role. Both the director and actor had previously collaborated on the 2006 film, Rob-B-Hood. Chan also reunites with stunt coordinator Nicky Li, a former leader of the Jackie Chan Stunt Team, who has worked on several of Chan's films including Rob-B-Hood, Divergence and Invisible Target. The screenplay was co-written by Alan Yuen, who has previously collaborated with Chan on films such as Rob-B-Hood and New Police Story.

=== Development ===
Connected was greenlit by Warner China Film HG, who hoped that the film would appeal to the Hong Kong's cell phone user population. The studio approached director Benny Chan, one of the most sought-after film directors of Hong Kong action cinema. Chan and his screenwriters spent two years working on the script. It went through various rewrites, before the writers finally created a scenario closely similar to the film Cellular. When comparing his film to Cellular, Chan said that his film includes "many elements that Hong Kong action movies do best - human combat, action, flying cars", though he wanted to make the characters in his film seem more real and believable.

=== Filming ===
The film was shot entirely in Hong Kong under a budget of HK$45 million (US$5.8 million), which was considered a conservative figure among growing Chinese movie budgets. Chan described the film as the most demanding film in his career, as he and co-screenwriters Alan Yuen and Xu Bing tried to make the film appeal to Chinese audiences. The director first filmed Barbie Shu’s scenes before filming Louis Koo’s portion. Both actors, however, share one scene together. During filming, the Hong Kong Government refused to grant a permit to film a flying car scene in a busy city district, thus the filmmakers could only shift filming to the outskirts of Hong Kong, proving that they could do the same without the government’s help.

Koo performed his own stunts, stating, "Whether it’s a car chase, rolling down a hill or jumping out of a falling car, I’m fine with the stunts as long as the outcome gives the effect we want." He later revealed that he suffered from external injuries. For the film's car chase sequence, Koo persuaded Chan to let him perform the stunt himself, feeling that the "result of which would be more believable."

== Reception ==
=== Box office ===
On opening weekend in Hong Kong, Connected topped the box office, grossing HK$3.61 million, with HK$1.08 million from 42 screens on a four-day weekend. At the end of its box-office run in Hong Kong, the film had grossed a total of HK$13.64 million.

== Awards and nominations ==
Year	Ceremony	Category	Name	Result	Ref
2008	45th Golden Horse Awards	Best Film Editing	Yau Chi-wai	Won	
2008	45th Golden Horse Awards	Best Action Choreography	Nicky Li	Won	
2009	28th Hong Kong Film Awards	Best Director	Benny Chan	Nominated	
2009	28th Hong Kong Film Awards	Best Actress	Barbie Shu	Nominated	
2009	28th Hong Kong Film Awards	Best Film Editing	Yau Chi-wai	Won	
2009	28th Hong Kong Film Awards	Best Action Choreography	Nicky Li	Nominated	
2009	28th Hong Kong Film Awards	Best Sound Design	Chris Goodes, Sam Wong	Nominated	
