= Happiness (2016 film) =

2016 Hong Kong film by Andy Lo

- Film poster
- 幸運是我
- Directed by: Andy Lo
- Written by: Andy Lo
- Produced by: Yu Wai-kwok; Catherine Kwan
- Starring: Kara Wai; Carlos Chan; Cya Liu
- Music by: Yusuke Hatano
- Distributed by: Emperor Motion Pictures
- Release dates: 26 August 2016 (China); 8 September 2016 (Hong Kong)
- Running time: 113 minutes
- Country: Hong Kong
- Language: Cantonese

Happiness (Chinese: 幸運是我; pinyin: xìngyùn shì wǒ; Jyutping: hang6 wan6 si6 ngo5; lit. 'Lucky is me') is a 2016 Hong Kong drama film directed and written by Andy Lo. Centred around the story of a cognitive disorder patient, the film stars Kara Wai, Carlos Chan and Cya Liu. It was released on 8 September 2016.

== Plot ==
After the death of his mother, Chan Kai-yuk (Carlos Chan) moves from Guangzhou to Hong Kong and attempts to reunite with his father (Chin Siu-ho), who abandoned the family and started a new marriage. Sacked from a restaurant, Chan cannot afford his housing rental fee and is forced to leave. While sleeping on the street, he is helped by Kam (Louis Cheung), who is a chef at Beloved Community Centre, which is dedicated to supporting the needy in the area. Although he is offered a job at the centre, he cannot accept it unless he has a proof of address. He seeks help from Tse Yuen-fan (Kara Wai), whom he had randomly encountered and helped at a wet market.

Tse is a middle-aged childless ex-singer who lives by herself after her only tenant moved out. Initially suspicious of Chan, she later accepts him to be her new tenant after he gives her a dozen eggs as a present. She lives a simple and routine lifestyle and demands that Chan strictly follow her timetable at the living room. Now with a residential address, Chan starts to work at Beloved, where he is introduced to Xiaoyue (Cya Liu), a social work intern student from Guangzhou, and Fong (Yan Ng), a social worker. Assigned to a food sharing scheme, Chan cooperates with Xiaoyue, whom he has a crush on, but knows about her relationship later.

Making fun of and then frustrated with Tse's poor memory, Chan takes her to Beloved, where Fong refers her to a mini–mental state examination. She receives lower-than-standard points and is diagnosed with mild cognitive disorder. He is at first indifferent to the result but starts to realise the seriousness when she loses her direction en route home. Fearing that he will have to take on the responsibility of caring for her when her condition deteriorates, he flees the flat without informing her. However, after seeing her searching for him recklessly in nearby areas, he remembers his own late mother and therefore returns, against his closest friend Fat's (James Ng) advice. Under his monitoring, she begins medication that aims to slower the deterioration of her cognitive condition.

With Fat's assistance, Chan is able to locate his father, along with his new family. He then secretly takes his younger stepbrother to an indoor playground and treats him to ice cream. He is unaware of his brother's peanut allergy, which causes the boy to develop acute symptoms. When taking him to the hospital, Chan is beaten his angry father, who is ordered by his new wife to cut any connections with him. When Chan tearfully agrees not to disturb his father's life again, he is comforted by Tse and Xiaoyue. Tse asks Chan to call her mother.

Gradually realising her worsening condition, Tse makes a will to name Chan the inheritor of all her properties, including the flat she inherited from her former boss, on the condition that he will take care of her in the capacity of her son. Living like a family, Tse is indulged in her past hobby of drawing and Chan starts his new job at a restaurant. At a visit to Beloved, he is told that Xiaoyue has already returned to Guangzhou. Her leaving note reveals that she has been admiring his love towards his terminally ill mother since they met before at a Guangzhou hospital, although he did not recognise her. Although her relationship with her boyfriend has failed in the end, she treasures the interpersonal bondings in Hong Kong, especially that between Chan and Tse.

== Cast ==
- Kara Wai as Tse Yuen-fan:

Wai's mother is an Alzheimer disease patient and some of her experiences are adapted in the film. She feels regret for failing to notice and understand her mother's symptoms and treating her badly; therefore she views her participation in the film as a remedy and apology to her mother. She was awarded the Asian CineVision (ACV) 2016 Asian Media Humanitarian Award in New York on 19 July 2016 for her efforts in promoting elderly care and raising public awareness of it.

- Carlos Chan as Chan Kai-yuk
- Cya Liu as Xiaoyue
- Louis Cheung as Kam
- Yan Ng as Fong
- Chin Siu-ho as Chan Fung
- James Ng as Fat
- Brenda Lam as Fa
- Lawrence Chou as Jeff
- Susan Shaw as restaurant owner

== Music ==
The theme Song "Lucky is me" (Chinese: 幸運是我; Jyutping: hang3 wan6 si6 ngo5), sung by Mag Lam, is a remake from the 1983 Cantopop song originally sung by Deanie Ip.

== Awards ==
Award / Film Festival	Category	Winner/Nominee	Result
7th Golden Lotus Awards	Best Picture		Nominated
7th Golden Lotus Awards	Best Actress	Kara Wai	Won
7th Golden Lotus Awards	Best Supporting Actor	Carlos Chan	Won
7th Golden Lotus Awards	Best Writing	Andy Lo	Nominated
36th Hong Kong Film Awards	Best Actress	Kara Wai	Won
36th Hong Kong Film Awards	Best New Performer	James Ng	Nominated
36th Hong Kong Film Awards	Best Original Film Song	Yusuke Hatano ("Better Tomorrow")	Nominated
36th Hong Kong Film Awards	Best New Director	Andy Lo	Nominated
17th Chinese Film Media Awards	Best Actress	Kara Hui	Nominated
17th Chinese Film Media Awards	Best New Director	Andy Lo	Nominated
24th Beijing College Student Film Festival	Best Screenplay	Andy Lo	Nominated
24th Beijing College Student Film Festival	Best Actress	Kara Wai	Nominated
