= Dressage To Win =

Television series

- 盛裝舞步愛作戰
- Genre: Romantic drama, Teen
- Created by: Chin Kwok Wai
- Starring: Michelle Wai; Ken Hung; Carlos Chan; Wylie Chiu; Him Law; Kimmy Kwan; Ryan Lam; Katy Kung; Andy Hui; Mandy Lieu; Vanko Wong; Phoebe Chan; Renee Lee; Kimasa Kwok
- Opening theme: "Step From Heart to Heart" by Phoenix Yeung, Iris Wu
- Country of origin: Hong Kong
- Original language: Cantonese
- No. of seasons: 1
- No. of episodes: 9

Production
- Running time: 20-23, 40-42 minutes

Original release
- Network: Television Broadcasts Limited
- Release: June 14 – August 3, 2008

Dressage To Win (盛裝舞步愛作戰) is a nine-episode Hong Kong television series created by TVB in celebration of the 2008 Olympics held in Beijing. The series revolves around 12 students attending horse-riding school in the hopes to get a scholarship to go to England.

Dressage To Win is part of the Four Leaf Clover TVB series and guest stars many TVB actors and singers throughout.

== Plot ==
Twelve students compete to win a scholarship to England for horseback riding. The story's main couple includes Ben and Michelle who were lovers but, due to a misunderstanding, they broke up. A few years later they meet up again at horseback riding camp competing with each for the scholarship. Other couples include Kimmy and Ah Him, and couple Nel and Ah Boy who are complete opposites of each other. As the competition heats up so does the love between these students.

== Cast ==
- Michelle Wai as Michelle
- Ken Hung as Ben
- Carlos Chan as Nel
- Wylie Chiu as Boy
- Him Law as Ah Him
- Kimmy Kwan as Kimmy
- Ryan Lam as Peter
- Katy Kung as Mary
- Andy Hui as Siu Ma
- Mandy Lieu as Mandy
- Vanko Wong as Mei Mei
- Phoebe Chan as Phoebe
- Renee Lee as Renee
- Kimasa Kwok as Kimasa
- Bill Chan as principal
- Andy Hui as Siu Ma
- Tracy Ip Mrs. Dai Ma
- Mandy Lieu as Mandy
- Ivan Wang as Hero Sir
- William So as William So

=== Guests ===
Episode 1

Actor	Role	Additional Info
Hins Cheung	passerby	
Benz Hui	cashier	

Episode 2

Actor	Role	Additional Info
Ella Koon	cashier	
Natalis Chan	horse owner	
Yu Man Si	Yu Man Si	

Episode 3

Actor	Role	Additional Info
Eddie Ng	Siu Ma's friend & horse groomer	
Edmond Leung	Siu Ma's friend & horse groomer	
Niki Chow	horse owner	

Episode 4

Actor	Role	Additional Info
Eddie Ng	Siu Ma's friend & horse groomer	
Edmond Leung	Siu Ma's friend & horse groomer	
Hotcha	students	
Grace H	Grace H	Siu Ma's ex-girlfriend
Chow Jung	Chow Jung	

Episode 5

Actor	Role	Additional Info
Henry Yue	Kimmy's father	
Ching Hor Wai	Kimmy's mother	
Fiona Fung	sales clerk	
Mimi Chu	Ah Him's mother	Cafe owner
Calinda Chan	Ah Him's first sister	
Destiny Cheng	Ah Him's second sister	
Doris Chow	Ah Him's third sister	

Episode 6

Actor	Role	Additional Info
Wilfred Lau	horse groomer	
Fiona Sit	mental patient	
Joey Mak	a nurse	
Jason Chan	Dr. Chan	Michelle's doctor

Episode 7

Actor	Role	Additional Info
Jason Chan	Dr. Chan	Michelle's doctor
Charles Szeto	passerby	cafe customer
Alex Fong	Sean	Waterskiing instructor

Episode 8

Actor	Role	Additional Info
JJ Jia	Lola	pursuing Ben
Ben Wong	Lee Sir	
Dan Jun Wai	Dan Jun Wai	
Leo Ho	Leo Ho	
Freeze	Freeze	
