= Walk with Me (2019 film) =

2019 Malaysia-Hong Kong film by Ryon Lee

- Directed by: Ryon Lee
- Starring: Michelle Wai; Alex Lam; Anna Ng; Richard Ng; Qi Yuwu
- Distributed by: MM2 Entertainment
- Release dates: 22 August 2019 (Hong Kong); 3 October 2019 (Malaysia); 21 November 2019 (Singapore)
- Running time: 92 minutes
- Countries: Hong Kong; Malaysia
- Language: Cantonese

Walk with Me (Chinese: 双魂; lit. 'Double Soul') is a 2019 Cantonese-language horror thriller film. A Malaysia-Hong Kong co-production, the film tells the story of a woman who is started to be haunted by her childhood doll, a doll that will help her take revenge on her enemies.

It is released on 21 November 2019 in Singapore, 3 October 2019 in Malaysia, and on 22 August 2019 in Hong Kong.

== Synopsis ==
Sam works in a sewing factory and lives with her uncaring parents, and when growing up she counts on to her favorite doll. Due to her introverted nature, she is bullied by her colleagues in her factory workplace, and is possibly sexually assaulted by her manager. Sam began to feel that there was a little girl or doll with her in the house and everywhere she went. She felt the doll was a reincarnation of her late stillborn brother. Unable to bear these pressure anymore, she resorts to asking the strange doll for help dealing with the bullies. When death happens, she fears that the doll might be responsible.

== Cast ==
- Michelle Wai
- Alex Lam Tak Shun
- Anna Ng
- Richard Ng
- Qi Yuwu
