= The Trading Floor =

2018 Hong Kong television miniseries

- Official poster
- Traditional Chinese: 東方華爾街
- Simplified Chinese: 东方华尔街
- Hanyu Pinyin: Dōng Fāng Huá Ěr Jiē
- Jyutping: Dung1 Fong1 Waa4 Ji2 Gaai1
- Genre: Financial thriller
- Created by: Cora Yim
- Written by: Frances To; Anthony Yan; Ho Wing-wong; Yu Pan-pan; Lo Ka-yee; Oscar Fung
- Directed by: Wong Kwok-keung
- Starring: Francis Ng; Joseph Chang; Yu Nan; Patrick Tam; Maggie Cheung; Liu Kai-chi; Carlos Chan; Poon Chan-leung; Jacky Cai; Jiang A-Joe
- Composers: Lam Kwan-fai; Julian Chan
- Country of origin: Hong Kong
- Original language: Cantonese
- No. of episodes: 5

Production
- Executive producers: Wong Kwok-keung; Eddie Espinal; Sun Zhonghuai
- Producer: Andy Lau
- Production locations: Cyberjaya, Malaysia
- Cinematography: Tam Wan-kai
- Editor: Wong Hoi
- Camera setup: Multi-camera
- Production companies: Fox Networks Group; Tencent Penguin Pictures; Focus Television Production
- Budget: US$5 million

Original release
- Network: Star Chinese Movies
- Release: 24 May – 21 June 2018

The Trading Floor is a 2018 Hong Kong financial thriller television miniseries produced by Andy Lau and directed by Wong Kwok-keung. The series stars Francis Ng, Joseph Chang and Yu Nan, with special appearances by Patrick Tam and Maggie Cheung, while the recurring cast includes Liu Kai-chi, Carlos Chan, Poon Chan-leung, Jacky Cai and Jiang A-Joe. Co-produced by Fox Networks Group, Tencent Penguin Pictures and Lau's Focus Television Production, The Trading Floor premiered on 24 May 2018 on Star Chinese Movies, as well as being available for streaming for subscribers on Fox +, with every episode airing each Thursday.

== Plot ==
Anthony Yip (Francis Ng), the Secretary of the Minister of Economic Development, collaborates with the "Three Financial Giants": Eastman Properties president Ronald Man (played by Albert Cheung), Evergate Construction Materials president Fok Kin (Mark Cheung) and Marco Media president Cheung Yung (Law Kar-ying) to manipulate the financial market for profit. In order to generate an even greater gain, Yip brings back financial genius Wai Hong (Joseph Chang) from Myanmar, where he had been hiding from international authorities, in order to set the stage for a new financial crisis.

Wai manipulates the stock market with a series of expert moves, but because of back-to-back involvement in numerous incidents of financial interference, he attracts the attention of Securities & Futures Commission investigator Claudia Fang (Yu Nan) while, wall the players are unknowingly walking into a trap set by Yip.

Yip and Wai were formerly members and the best brother-in-arms of an underground financial elite team CASH for the last ten years. Together with two other members, Nick Cheuk (played by Patrick Tam) and Pamela (played by Maggie Cheung), they defeated some financial giants to prevent a market-maker's actions in an attempt to turn back the damage done to the market ecology. Unfortunately, Yip suddenly turns on them, betraying everyone in his team. From then on, Wai and Yip become sworn enemies. Hong forms his own CASH team with new members BJ (Carlos Chan), Sarah (Jacky Cai), Dow (Jiang A-joe) and Master (Poon Chan-leung) to stop Yip from another of his conspiracies.

== Cast ==
=== Main cast ===
- Francis Ng as Anthony Yip (葉抱一)
- Joseph Chang as Wai Hong (韋航)
- Yu Nan as Claudia Fong (方旋)

=== Special appearance ===
- Patrick Tam as Nick Cheuk (卓意寧)
- Maggie Cheung Ho-yee as Pamela

=== Recurring cast ===
- Liu Kai-chi as Law Kai-chung (羅啟中)
- Gwei Lun-mei as Anna
- Carlos Chan as BJ
- Poon Chan-leung as Master (老爺)
- Jacky Cai as Sarah (莎)
- Jiang A-Joe as Dow
- Albert Cheung as Ronald Man (文啟山)
- Mark Cheung as Fok Kin (霍堅)
- Law Kar-ying as Cheung Yung (張融)
- Alan Luk as Cheung Chak-san (張澤新)
- Justin Cheung as Leung Kai (梁佳)
- Fish Liew
- Anna Ng
- Leung Kin-ping
- Deno Cheung

== Production ==
=== Development ===
The project was first announced at the 2017 Hong Kong Filmart on 12 March 2017 as a five-episode miniseries to be produced by Andy Lau, co-produced by Lau's Focus Television Production and Fox Networks Group, and set to be aired on Fox's Star Chinese Movies. The series is created by Cora Yim, the head of Chinese entertainment and territory head of Hong Kong for Fox Networks Group with Wong Kwok-keung, directed of the acclaimed 2014 HKTV series, The Election, was set to direct. With a total budget of US$5 million (US$1 million per episode), development for the series took a total of three years.

=== Filming ===
The series held its production commencement ceremony in April 2017 where the cast was also unveiled, which include Francis Ng, Joseph Chang, Yu Nan, Patrick Tam, Maggie Cheung Ho-yee, Carlos Chan, Poon Chan-leung, Jacky Cai and Jiang A-Joe. Filming for The Trading Floor began in May 2017 Cyberjaya, Malaysia, where locations and sets portraying an older Hong Kong were available. Production wrapped up in late June of the same year.

== Release ==
On 8 May 2018, the series released its official trailer and poster and was announced its premier on 24 May 2018 on Fox's Star Chinese Movies network and the streaming platform, Fox +

On 23 May 2018, the series held a global press conference where it was attended by producer Lau, director Wong and cast members Ng, Chang, Tam, Cheung, Liu, Chan, Cai and Fish Liew. The series premiered the following day, airing two episodes, while each new episode will air every Thursday.

== Awards ==
Year	Award	Category	Nominee	Result
2019	23rd Asian Television Awards	Best Drama Series	The Trading Floor	Nominated
2019	23rd Asian Television Awards	Best Actor in a Leading Role	Francis Ng	Nominated
2019	23rd Asian Television Awards	Best Actor in a Leading Role	Chang Hsiao-Chuan	Nominated

== See also ==
- Andy Lau filmography
