= Incredible Mama =

- Genre: Superhero; Comedy
- Directed by: Au Yiu-hing
- Starring: Kara Hui; David Chiang; Sam Chan; Carlos Chan; Maggie Wong; Henry Leung; Dominic Lam; Felix Lok; Mimi Kung; Kathy Yuen; Mannor Chan; Adrian Wong; Pai Piao
- Country of origin: Hong Kong
- Original language: Cantonese
- No. of episodes: 9

Production
- Production location: Hong Kong
- Camera setup: Multi-camera
- Running time: 43–50 minutes
- Production company: Hong Kong Television Network

Original release
- Release: February 9 – February 19, 2015

Incredible Mama (Chinese: 我阿媽係黑玫瑰), is a 2015 superhero action comedy television series produced by Hong Kong Television Network. Originally 25 episodes, the series was condensed into 9. The first episode premiered on February 9, 2015.

== Cast ==
- Kara Hui as Chung-Sam Fat-yuen (鍾沈法婉)
  - She is actually the famous gangster Black Rose (黑玫瑰), one of the gang Justice Union (正義聯盟), who is wanted by the police force. The wife of Chung Hok-saang, the mother of Chung Lok-shan, Lok-seoi and Lok-guk.
- David Chiang as Chung Hok-saang (鍾學笙)
  - One of the writers of Sat Daily (實報), the newspaper. The husband of Fat-yuen, father of Lok-shan, Lok-seoi and Lok-guk. Finally discover that Fat-yuen is the gangster Black Rose who is wanted by the police and disappointed in her.
- Sam Chan as Chung Lok-shan (鍾樂山)
  - An ordinary police officer, the son of Fat-yuen and Hok-saang. The boyfriend of Anna.
- Carlos Chan as Chung Lok-tin (鍾樂田)
  - Originally named Luk Gwan-chi (陸君梓). Adopted by Fat-yuen and Hok-saang. He's actually the son of Sir Luk Gwan-chong.
- Maggie Wong as Chung Lok-seoi (鍾樂水)
  - A form 6 secondary school student. She's actually the gangster Little Hero.
- Henry Leung as Chung Lok-guk (鍾樂谷)
  - A form 1 secondary school student.
- Dominic Lam as Sir Luk Gwan-chong (陸君莊警司)
  - A policeman who is actually the gangster White General. The father of Chung Lok-tin (originally named Luk Gwan-chi).
- Felix Lok as Hung Shue-lam (洪樹臨)
  - The owner of the Hung-shue Group who is actually the gangster Red-flower Man (紅花俠).
- Mimi Kung as To Hoi-wing (杜凱詠)
  - One of the gangsters who named Golden Cat of Justice Union.
- Kathy Yuen as Anna Tai On-nah/ Angelina Tai On-kei
- Mannor Chan as Ngau Siu-chun (牛小津) (Yellow Bird)
  - One of the gangsters of Justice Union.
- Adrian Wong
- Pai Piao as Sau Sin-fung (仇先鋒)
  - Nicknamed North Point Captain. A former policeman who worked in the North Point Police Station.
- Luvin Ho
- Mason Chiu
- Cheng Ka-sang as Gam Yim-lo (金閻羅) / Lo Yim-gam (羅炎金)
  - The head of a gang.
- Hui Ming-chi
- Kwok Fung as Fok Dak-wah (霍德華)
- Janice Ting as Vanessa (雲妮沙特普)
- Candy Chu
- Shek Sau as Lung Man-san (龍文新), guest star episode 1
- Yu Mo-lin, episode 4
- Casper Chan, episode 5
