= Change (Jason Chan album) =

Studio album by Jason Chan
- Released: May 30, 2008
- Genre: Canto-pop
- Languages: Cantonese, English, Mandarin Chinese
- Label: SME

Jason Chan chronology
First Experience (2007)	Change (2008)	Close Up - EP (2009)

Change is the second album by Hong Kong singer Jason Chan, released in 2009.

== Track listing ==
No.	Title	Length
1.	"I Miss You"	3:44
2.	"理智與感情 (Intellectual & Emotional)" (featuring 楊丞琳)	3:44
3.	"Mr. Adult"	4:03
4.	"你來自哪顆星 (Which Star Are You From)"	3:34
5.	"原諒我怕黑 (Forgive My Fear of the Dark)"	3:56
6.	"Moonlight Express"	3:43
7.	"I Miss You" (Late Night Version)	3:58
8.	"理智與感情 (Intellectual & Emotional)"	3:43
9.	"車匙 (Car Keys)" (Alternative version)	3:25
10.	"I Miss You" (Mandarin version)	3:44
