= Shek Sau =

Chinese actor in Hong Kong

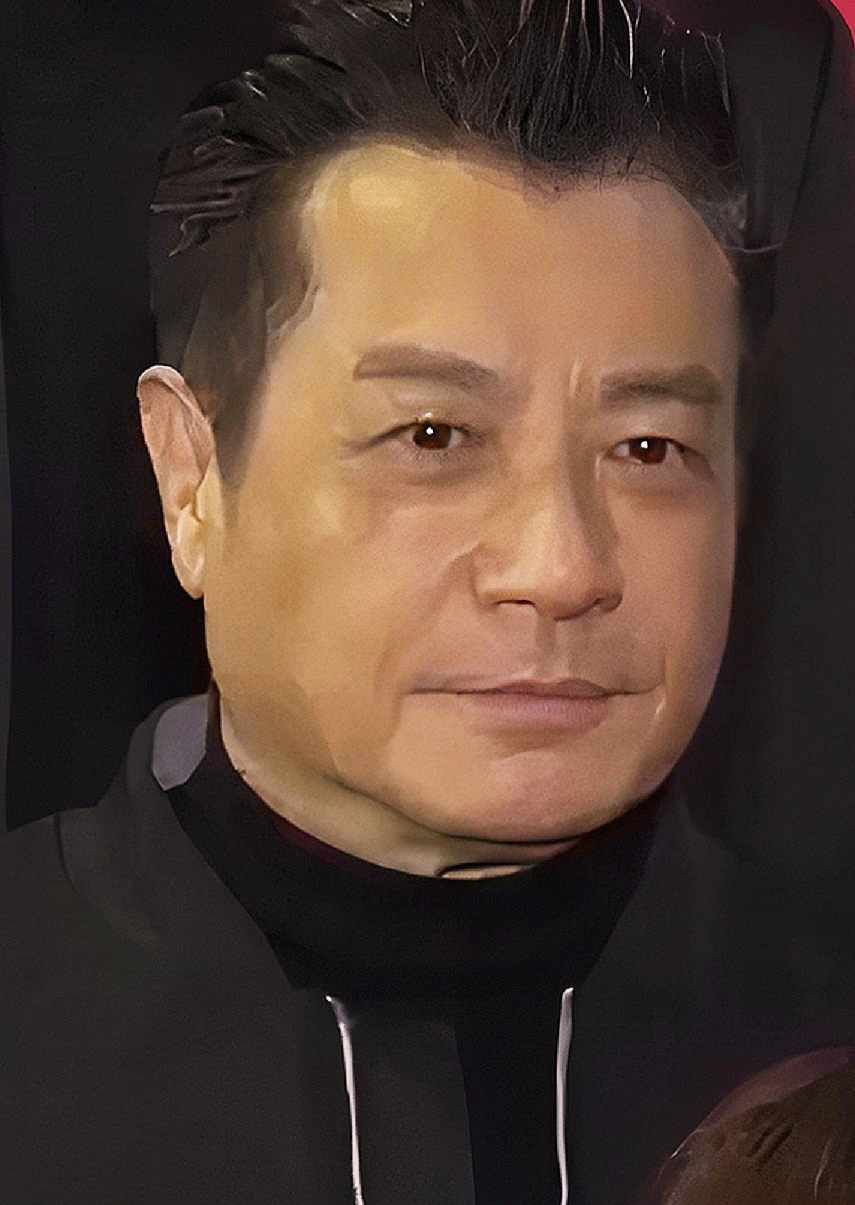
- Sau in 2019
- Born: Chan Shek-sau, Bill (陳碩修); 21 November 1947 (age 78); Hong Kong
- Years active: 1956–present

Shek Sau (Chinese: 石修, born Chan Shek-sau, Bill, 21 November 1947) is a Hong Kong actor working for TVB. His son, Sam Chan, also works for TVB as an actor. In 2005, they appeared in a cooking show together for a Father's Day promotion.

== Filmography ==
Year	Film	Role	Notes
1958	Sword of Blood and Valour	young Yuen Sing-Chi	
1977	A House Is Not A Home		TV series
1979	The Twins	Fa Mo-ku	TV series
1981	The Young Heroes	Hung Hei-koon	TV series
1982	The Demi-Gods and Semi-Devils	Muk-yung Fuk	TV series
1985	The Battlefield	Hung Yu	TV series
1985	The Possessed	Tungfong Bak	TV series
1987	The Legend of the Book and the Sword	Man Tai-loi	TV series
2000	Those Were the Days		
2002	So Close	Chow Lui	
2003	Triumph in the Skies	Phillip	TV series
2004	Angels of Mission	Lin Hok-man	TV series
2004	Wars of In-Laws	Ning Fung-tak	TV series
2006	Bar Bender	Ngai Sing-kwan	TV series
2006	Love Guaranteed	Yim Ho-king	TV series
2006	Glittering Days	Seung Sing	TV series
2007	Twins Mission	Mr. Mok	
2007	War and Destiny	Takeshi Matsuda	TV series
2008	Dressage To Win		TV series
2007–2008	Best Selling Secrets		TV series
2010	Suspects in Love		TV series
2010	Twilight Investigation		TV series
2011	Ghetto Justice	Chiang Pak-kei	TV series
2011	Super Snoops	Chu Tat-yan	TV series
2012	The Next Magic		
2012	King Maker	Fan Chiu-lun	TV series
2012	Silver Spoon, Sterling Shackles		TV series
2014–2015	The Election	CK	TV series
2015	Once Upon a Song	Jonathan	TV series
2015	Incredible Mama		TV series
2015	The Menu		TV series
2015	Detective Gui		
2016	The Secret		
2016	Kidnap Ding Ding Don		
2016	S Storm	Ha Chi-yin	
2017	Shock Wave	Wan Hiu-fung	
2018	Fist Fight	Wan Sing-hang	TV series
2019	The Defected	Kwok Chin-leung	TV series
2020	Al Cappuccino	Koo Wing-cheung	TV series
2020	Hong Kong Love Stories	Yau Hung-kin	TV series
2021	Return of the Cuckoo 2021	Chuen Hoi-king	TV series
2022	Communion	Cheng Chi-ho	TV series
