= Can't Be Half =

Studio album by Jason Chan
- Released: December 18, 2009
- Genre: Canto-pop
- Language: Cantonese. English
- Label: SME

Jason Chan chronology
Close Up - EP (2008)	Can't Be Half (2009)

Can't be half is the third full-length studio album released by Chinese Canto-pop singer Jason Chan. The album contains songs in Cantonese, English and Mandarin. The album was released on 18 December 2009 by record label Sony Music Entertainment. One of the songs appearing on the album, "最後的擁抱" contains a part of the melody from a song by the Japanese pop group flumpool. The guitarist from Flumpool is listed as the producer for the song.

== Track listing ==
CD

No.	Title	Producer(s)	Length
1.	"拍一半拖 (Half Dating)"	Albert Leung	4:17
2.	"人外有人"		4:56
3.	"最後的擁抱 (The Last Embrace)*"		4:21
4.	"無可厚非"	Albert Leung	4:18
5.	"Imaginary Love"	Chet Lam	3:25
6.	"遲愛" (Late to Love)"		4:00
7.	"後無來者"		4:07
8.	"你瞞我瞞 (You Deceive, I Deceive)"		3:59
9.	"逸後 (From Now On)"		4:19
10.	"秘密 (Secret)" (Mandarin)		3:53
11.	"感情課" (Lesson in Emotions)" (Mandarin)		4:14

DVD

No.	Title	Director(s)	Length
1.	"拍一半拖 (Half Dating) MV"	David Cow	4:17
2.	"無可厚非 MV"	David Cow	4:18
3.	"遲愛 (Late To Love) MV"		4:00
4.	"秘密(Secret) MV"		3:57
5.	"感情課 (Lesson in Emotions) MV"		4:13

- "最後的擁抱" has the same melody as the Japanese song "MW ~Dear Mr. & Ms. Picaresque~" (MW ～Dear Mr. & Ms. ピカレスク～) by the Japanese group flumpool. Kazuki Sakai, a guitarist in flumpool, is credited as one of the producers for the song for Jason Chan.

== Cultural Influence ==
- "You Deceive, I Deceive" has become one of the greatest hit of Jason Chan. After 2011 Tōhoku earthquake and tsunami, some netizens from Mainland China were celebrating for the disaster in Japan. Some netizens in Hong Kong had created a transformative work (namely "Martyr in Fukushima", 福島烈士) based on this song, in the hope of fighting back the netizens from Mainland China, and to show support to the Japanese victims. The song was also supported by Sony Music Entertainment Hong Kong.
