= Line Walker (film) =

2016 Hong Kong-Chinese film by Jazz Boon

- Poster
- Chinese: 使徒行者
- Directed by: Jazz Boon
- Written by: Cat Kwan
- Produced by: Wong Jing; Virginia Lok; Tommy Leung
- Starring: Nick Cheung; Louis Koo; Francis Ng; Charmaine Sheh; Benz Hui
- Cinematography: Kenny Tse
- Edited by: Azrael Chung
- Music by: Yusuke Hatano
- Production companies: Shaw Brothers International Pictures (Hong Kong); J.Q. Pictures (Hong Kong); Media Asia Film (Hong Kong); Television Broadcasts Limited (Hong Kong); One Cool Film Production (Hong Kong); Spring Net Media Huoer Guosi Company (China); Beijing Oriental Joy Dragon Film & TV Culture Media Company (China); Flame Pictures Company (China); Croton Cultural Media Company (China); Media Asia Distribution (Beijing) Company (China); Sky Grant Entertainment (China); PJ One Cool Film Company (China)
- Release date: 11 August 2016
- Running time: 109 minutes
- Countries: Hong Kong; China
- Languages: Cantonese; Mandarin
- Box office: US$92.3 million

Line Walker is a 2016 action thriller film adapted from the 2014 TVB series of the same name. Directed by Jazz Boon and starring Nick Cheung, Louis Koo, Francis Ng; Charmaine Sheh, Benz Hui and Au Siu-wai reprised their roles from the original drama. It was released in Hong Kong and mainland China on 11 August 2016.

== Plot ==
Inspector Q (Francis Ng) and Police Constable Ding Siu-ka (Charmaine Sheh) are top members of CIB Department, they are after a drug racket that is taking over the city. Unexpectedly, they receive a mystery message from a missing undercover agent "Blackjack". CIB tries to locate and process Blackjack before it's too late. The paranoid drug mafia leader Tung Pak-ho (Li Guangjie) plays his own troop on each other's throats, suspecting a mole. Meanwhile, boss Blue (Nick Cheung) and his right-hand man Shiu Chi-long (Louis Koo) participate in an internal struggle to become the top dogs irrespective of their strong friendship.

After surviving and shooting their way out of a drug deal ambush in Brazil, Rio de Janeiro, it becomes clear that Blue is Blackjack and upon knowing this, Shiu Chi-long tries to protect himself by using Blackjack's identity. They survive doubts and struggles between them but only for Blue to lose his life to an assassin sent by ruthless Tung Pak-ho. Inspector Q's life is lost facing goons and Ding's life is saved by her godfather Foon Hei Gor (Hui Shiu-hung), who is an undercover agent posing as a legendary retired don who is looking to get back into the criminal underworld in the city. Finally, Foon Hei Gor gets Tung Pak-ho arrested after punishing him for what he had done to his wife when Tung Pak-ho started out as a criminal.

== Cast ==
- Nick Cheung as Blue
- Louis Koo as Shiu Chi-long
- Francis Ng as Q sir/Inspector Q
- Charmaine Sheh as Ding Siu-ka
- Benz Hui as Foon Hei Gor
- Li Guangjie as Tung Pak-ho
- Zhang Huiwen as Siu Ying
- Xing Yu as sniper / assassin (credited as Shi Yanneng)
- Cheng Taishen as Kwok Ming
- Moses Chan as police superintendent
- Louis Cheung as guy blocking Blue at meeting
- Clara Lee as assassin (credited as Clara)

=== Cameos ===
- Lo Hoi-pang as guy at company meeting
- Bob Lam as Ferrari owner
- Cheng Tse-sing as Lin Dongyou
- Jade Leung as Karina
- Au Siu-wai as Hong Sir
- Rebecca Zhu as Samantha, CIB detective
- Stephen Wong as CIB detective (credited as Stephen Wong)
- Grace Wong as CIB detective
- Hugo Wong as Shiu Chi-long's subordinate
- Océane Zhu as CIB detective
- William Chak as Ng Pak
- Sammi Cheung as CIB detective

== Reception ==
The film grossed CN¥606.2 million at the Chinese box office. It grossed US$92.3 million worldwide.
