= Jason Chan (singer) =

- 陳柏宇
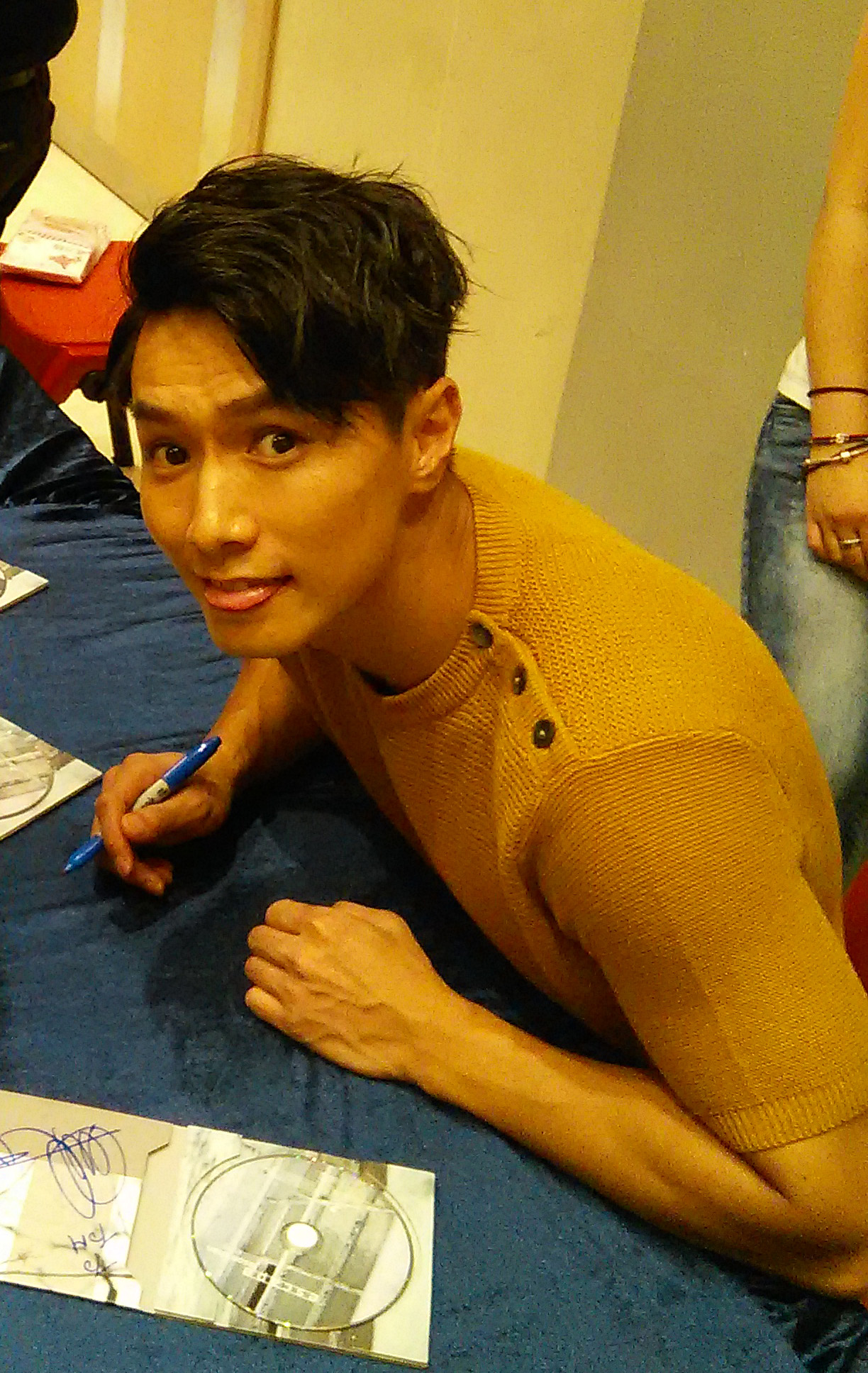
- Chan in 2015
- Occupations: Singer-songwriter; actor
- Years active: 2007–present
- Spouse: Leanne Fu Hiu-mei (m. 2017)
- Children: 2

Chinese name
- Traditional Chinese: 陳柏宇
- Simplified Chinese: 陈柏宇
Transcriptions
Standard Mandarin
- Hanyu Pinyin: Chén Bǎiyǔ
Yue: Cantonese
- Jyutping: can^{4} paak^{3} jyu^{5}
- Musical career
- Origin: Hong Kong
- Genres: Canto-pop, Hong Kong English pop, Mandarin pop
- Instruments: guitar, bass, piano
- Label: SME

Jason Chan Pak-yu (Chinese: 陳柏宇) is a Hong Kong singer. He debuted under Sony Music in 2006 and released his debut album First Experience in 2007 and has since released more than 10 albums. He has been dubbed by the Hong Kong media as the music industry's "hidden master" (樂壇隱世高手). Chan has also ventured into film and television, and business, owning two bars in Hong Kong.

== Life and career ==
=== Early life and career beginnings ===
Chan was born in Hong Kong and moved to Canada when he was seven years old with his mother after his parents divorced. He has a younger sister. He returned to Hong Kong in 2005 and worked in customer service at an IT firm. After his friend sent his demo and recordings from a singing competition in Canada to Sony Music Hong Kong (then known as Sony BMG), he was offered a contract and signed with the label.

=== 2008–2009: Close Up, Can't Be Half ===
Close Up is Chan's first extended play, and was released on 13 May 2009. Two singles were released from the EP, "I will be Loving You", and "You Lie I Lie" (你瞞我瞞), with both songs reaching number one on the Ultimate Song Chart, and charted in the top five of the other local charts. Chan released full-length album Can't Be Half on 18 December, completing the year with singles "Half Dating" and "No Wrong Done", both penned by Lin Xi, to moderate chart success. Chan won Outstanding Artiste (Hong Kong) at the 9th Global Chinese Music Awards.

=== 2011–2014: The Next Moment and Tales ===
Released on 15 March 2013, The Next Moment was Chan's sixth studio album. Singles "Let the Bullets Fly" (讓子彈飛), "Contradict", "People Around" were released as singles. Chan wrote six of the songs on the album, taking a much higher degree of creative control. A deluxe edition was issued 23 May, adding three music videos and footage from his Jason Chan & Friends The Next Moment mini-concert.

Tales was released 26 November 2013. In support of the album Chan headlined his first major concert, Tales Live 2013, at the Kowloonbay International Trade & Exhibition Centre Star Hall on 29 November 2013. The concert was released as a DVD+CD 31 March 2014 as TALES Live 2013/14.

=== 2015–2023: Escape, 10th anniversary and widespread recognition ===
In February 2016, Chan starred in the musical Ever After directed by Edmond Tong, alongside Evelyn Choi. The musical was slotted for eight shows. An original soundtrack was released in support of the musical, containing three original tracks. The lead track "Ever After" was sent to radio stations, eventually reaching number one on all major stations. "Ever After" also won Chan awards at year-end award shows. On 5 June, Chan co-headlined concert "KKBOX LIVE Jason Chan x Phil Lam Sing Together" (Note: Chinese: 陳柏宇 X 林奕匡 《一起唱》音樂會) at the Convention and Exhibition Centre. Chan returned to the charts with "The Last Episode", a jazz-oriented song. It reached number one on JSG, RTHK, and Metro Radio, and number two on Ultimate 903.

In March 2020, the World Wide Fund for Nature (WWF) Hong Kong Branch (WWF) once again invited Kay Tse and Jason Chan as ambassadors to promote sustainable living

On 25 June 2021, Chan released 53FPS. The conceptual EP is noted for a change in arrangement from Chan's previous albums. The lead single "Such Thing As Emotions" (感情这回事) achieved commercial and critical success, topping three local radio stations and won Ultimate Song Chart Awards 2020 Top Ten Songs Number 8.

On 10 and 11 December 2021, Chan headlined his second Hong Kong Coliseum concert Fight For___Live.

On 15 January 2023, Chan was arranged by his company Sony Music Entertainment (Hong Kong) to perform on the famous Japanese channel "THE FIRST TAKE", becoming the first Hong Kong singer to be invited. Re-singing his classic song "You Hide, I Hide". As of January 30, 2023, the original music video on YouTube has over 18 million views.

On January 18, 2023, two days after Chan uploaded a clip of his singing performance on the famous Japanese channel "THE FIRST TAKE", Kengo mocked him for being "exaggerated by online media" and "difficult to distinguish between flattery and criticism", and was criticized again. Some people think that Kengou is jealous that Chan "stole" his friend James Ng Yip-kwan's Commercial Radio Music Awards.

== Personal life ==
Chan married his longtime girlfriend Leanne Fu Hiu-mei, a model and actress, on 3 July 2017. The couple gave birth to their eldest daughter Abigail in 2018, and their second daughter Audrey in 2023.

== Controversy ==
In 2017, Chan took the lead in opening a store called "Yunchang Xiaolongkan Hotpot". In response to the question, Jason Chan insisted that the restaurant has obtained China's Xiaolongkan hot pot franchise. However, the real Xiaolongkan hot pot later stated an official channels that the company did not know the details of the "Yunchang Xiaolongkan Hot Pot" restaurant.

== Discography ==
- First Experience (2007)
- Change (2008)
- Close Up (2009)
- Can't Be Half (2009)
- Put On (2010)
- Quinquennium (2011)
- Lost and Found (2012)
- The Next Moment (2013)
- Tales (2013)
- Escape (2015)
- The Players (2016)
- I (2017)
- Present (2018)
- Anyone But Jason (2019)
- 53FPS (2021)
- Fight for___Live In Hong Kong Coliseum (2022)
- The Fight Goes On (2022)
- 陳柏宇 feat. 九龍搖擺俱樂部演唱會2023 (2023)
- In Rhythm (2023)
- Life Is Hard (2024)

== Filmography ==
Film
Year	English title	Chinese title	Role	Notes
2008	Love Is Elsewhere	愛情萬歲	Ah Sung	
2011	Lan Kwai Fong	喜愛夜蒲	Jacky	
2012	Natural Born Lovers	天生愛情狂		
2012	Love.Zero AIDS	愛 無滋	Frank	Short film
2014	Lan Kwai Fong 3	喜愛夜蒲3	Jacky	
2018	Adieu			
2021	Anita	梅艷芳	Band vocalist	

Television series
Year	English title	Chinese title	Network	Role	Notes
2007	Colours of Love	森之愛情	TVB	Jason	Episode 7
2008	Dressage To Win	盛裝舞步愛作戰	TVB	Dr. Chan	Episode 6 and 7
2015	Once Upon a Song	童話戀曲201314	HKTV	Handsome	
2015	Sexpedia	大眾情性	HKTV	Dicky Ko (高迪)	
2015	IPCC Files 2015	監警有道 2015	RTHK TV 31		

=== Television shows ===
Year	English title	Chinese title	Network	Role	Notes/Ref.
2020	King Maker III	全民造星III	ViuTV	Judge	EP31-35
2022	Youniverse	就是青春	HOY TV	Mentor	
2023	Pre-wedding	婚前試行為	ViuTV	Host	
2023	King Maker V	全民造星V	ViuTV	Judge	EP27-29
2023	Daddy goes to school	返學啦老豆	ViuTV	Host	
