= Michelle Wai =

Hong Kong actress

- 衛詩雅
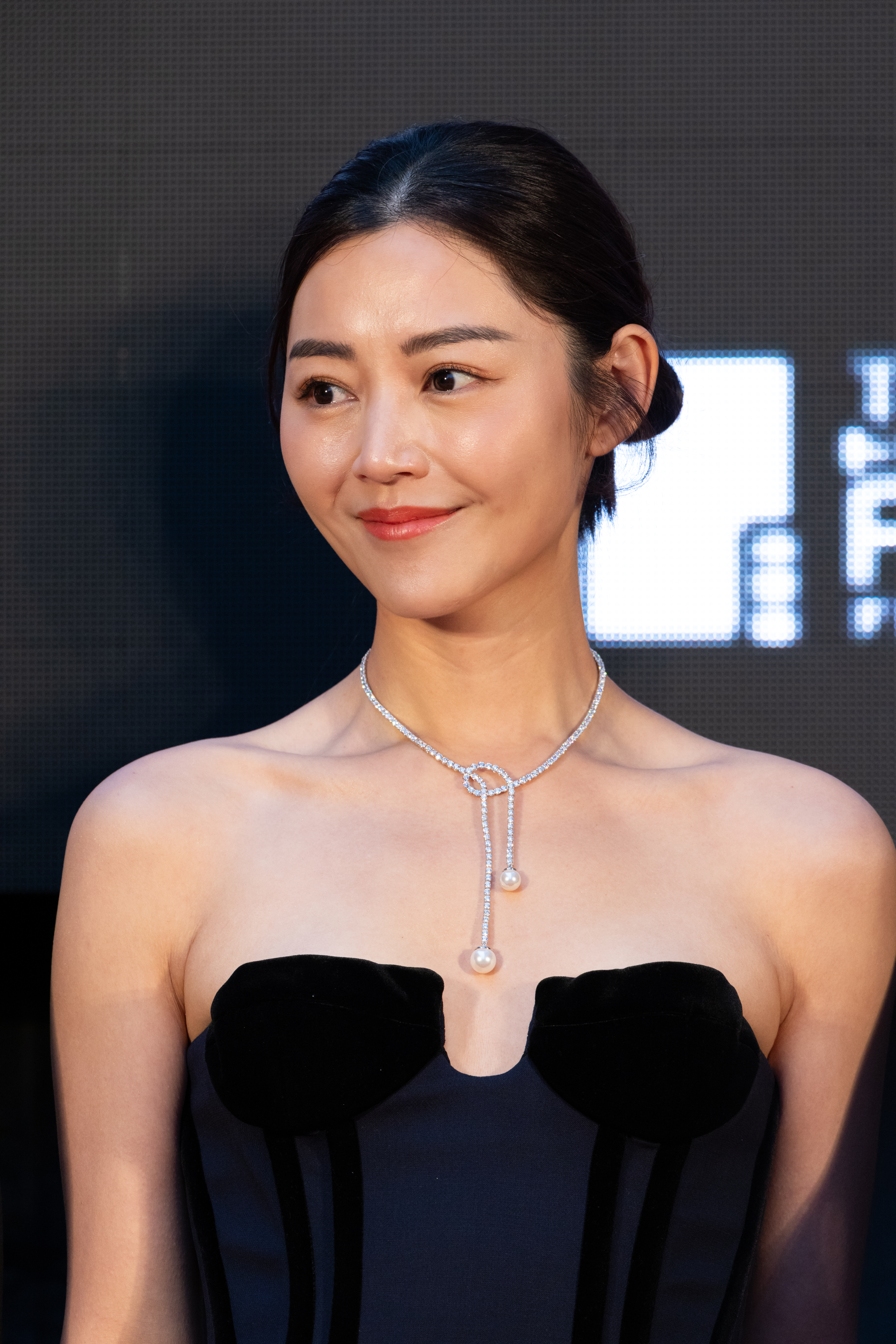
- Wai attending the 37th Tokyo International Film Festival in 2024
- Born: 24 November 1984 (age 41); British Hong Kong
- Occupations: Actress; model; singer
- Years active: 2008–present
- Agent: Emperor Motion Pictures
- Height: 1.62 m (5 ft 4 in)

Chinese name
- Traditional Chinese: 衛詩雅
- Simplified Chinese: 卫诗雅
Transcriptions
Standard Mandarin
- Hanyu Pinyin: Wèi Shīyǎ
Yue: Cantonese
- Jyutping: wai^{6} si^{1} ngaa^{5}
- Website: Official website

Michelle Wai Sze-Nga (Chinese: 衛詩雅; born 24 November 1984) is a Hong Kong model and actress. For her performance in The Last Dance (2024), she won the Hong Kong Film Award for Best Actress and the Hundred Flowers Award for Best Actress.

== Career ==
Wai worked as a jewelry salesperson and a part-time model before entering the industry. In 2008, she was introduced by her modeling agency Jamcast to audition for a role in the television series Dressage To Win. She was successfully cast and subsequently signed as an artist with Emperor Entertainment Group, with Mani Fok Man-Hei serving as her manager.

Wai has since appeared in numerous films and television productions. She gained wider recognition for her performances in ViuTV series, and for her portrayal of Ho-yee in the 2021 rom-com Ready o/r Knot (不日成婚), directed by Anselm Chan. She collaborated with Chan again for the sequel Ready o/r Rot (不日成婚2), which earned her a nomination for Best Actress at the 42nd Hong Kong Film Awards, marking her first nomination for a major acting award.

In 2024, Wai starred in The Last Dance, her third collaboration with Chan. The film was released in Hong Kong on 9 November, and Wai's lead performance was praised by viewers and critics. James Marsh of Deadline Hollywood hailed her as "the film’s true standout" and called the film "a genuine turning point in her career." Richard Kuipers of Variety called her "a particular standout as the troubled daughter whose frustrations and disappointments guide the story to a rousing finale." The film broke numerous box office records, grossing over HK$170 million (US$21.9 million) at the box office, making it the highest-grossing domestic film of all time in Hong Kong. Wai was named Best Actress by the Hong Kong Film Directors' Guild. In the same year, Wai attended the Japanese premiere of The Last Dance at the 37th Tokyo International Film Festival.

In 2025, Wai won Best Actress at the 43rd Hong Kong Film Awards for The Last Dance, marking her first Hong Kong Film Award win. She also won the Hundred Flowers Award for Best Actress, becoming the first Hong Kong actress in history to receive this honor. Wai also starred in Ciao UFO, directed by Patrick Leung. The film was released in Hong Kong on 19 March 2026, and Wai won Best Supporting Actress at the 44th Hong Kong Film Awards for her performance.

== Personal life ==
Wai grew up in Tai Ping Estate, Sheung Shui, Hong Kong. She has an older sister and a younger brother. Wai got engaged to her long-time boyfriend, aesthetic physician Kenley Chau, in 2024, and they married in 2025.

=== Name ===
When Wai first entered the industry, her agency suggested she drop the "Wai" from her name and use "Sze-Nga" as her stage name, as there was already a singer named "Wai Sze" in the industry. After Wai Sze stepped away from the industry, the name "Sze-Nga" led to confusion with another artist, Shiga Lin (Lin Sze-nga). Wai eventually suggested to her agency that she resume using her real name, "Wai Sze-Nga."

== Filmography ==
=== Film ===
Year	Title	Chinese title	Role	Ref.
2009	Happily Ever After	很想和你在一起	Auyeung Goonnam	
2009	Trick or Treat	愛出貓	Michelle	
2010	Hot Summer Days	全城熱戀熱辣辣	Model	
2010	Ex	前度	Cee	
2010	Girl$	囡囡	Icy	
2011	Love Is the Only Answer	愛回家		
2011	The Sorcerer and the White Snake	白蛇傳說	Bat Devil	
2012	Lives in Flames	起勢搖滾		
2012	Triad	紮職		
2013	Selling Memories	兜售回憶		
2013	Hardcore Comedy	重口味		
2014	As the Light Goes Out	救火英雄		
2014	Keening Woman	哭喪女		
2014	Golden Chicken 3	金雞SSS	Fa	
2015	12 Golden Ducks	十二金鴨		
2015	Insanity	暴瘋語		
2015	Paris Holiday	巴黎假期		
2016	Heaven in the Dark	暗色天堂		
2016	Show me your Love	大手牽小手		
2016	Battle of Life	天火		
2017	Cook Up a Storm	鋒味江湖之決戰食神		
2017	The Sleep Curse	失眠	Man Ching / Man Woon	
2017	77 Heartbreaks	諒他77次	Mandy	
2017	All My Goddess	女人永遠是對的	Ruo Yan	
2017	Meow	喵星人	Miss Lee	
2018	A Beautiful Moment			
2018	The Leaker			
2019	The White Storm 2: Drug Lords			
2019	Walk with Me			
2019	Lion Rock			
2019	Ciao UFO	再見UFO		
2020	Caught in Time			
2021	77 Heartwarmings			
2021	Ready o/r Knot	不日成婚	Ho-yee	
2023	Ready o/r Rot	不日成婚2	Ho-yee	
2023	The Brotherhood of Rebel	紮職2	Yuet	
2024	Customs Frontline	海關戰線	Katie	
2024	The Last Dance	破·地獄	Yuet	
2025	Sons of the Neon Night	風林火山	Little	
2026	V	空枪	Lok Ka-yuen	

=== Television ===
Year	Title	Chinese title	Role
2008	Dressage to Win	盛裝舞步愛作戰	Michelle
2010	Love Thy Family	愛回家	Ming Wai
2011	Youth Melody	青春旋律	Unknown
2012	Happy Marshal	歡樂元帥	
2012	Elite Brigade	火速救兵II	
2013	RTHK	非常平等任務 2013 – 少數	
2013	RTHK	私隱何價	
2015	Love in Time	還來得及再愛你	
2016	The Jungle (四川卫视)	怒放霸王花	Survivor
2020	The Gutter	歎息橋	何樂兒 (Joyce)
2023	Food Buddies		Kelly
2024	Margaret & David Tie	瑪嘉烈與大衛系列 絲絲	Diamond
