= First Experience =

Studio album by Jason Chan
- Released: May 3, 2007
- Genre: Canto-pop
- Languages: Cantonese, Mandarin Chinese
- Label: SME

Jason Chan chronology
First Experience (2007)	Change (2008)

First Experience is the debut studio album by Hong Kong singer Jason Chan, released in 2007. This album marked the beginning of Jason Chan’s career in the music industry, showcasing his unique vocal style and musical talent.

== Track listing ==
No.	Title	Producer(s)	Length
1.	"固執 (Stubborn)"		5:46
2.	"斷絕來往 (Terminate our Contact)"	黃凱琪	3:32
3.	"車匙 (Car Keys)"		3:25
4.	"認命 (Resign to Fate)"		3:08
5.	"萬中無一"		4:10
6.	"醫生的悲哀 (Doctor's Depression)"		3:45
7.	"不等於 (Not Equal To)"		3:14
8.	"斷絕來往" (featuring 黃凱琪)	黃凱琪	3:34
9.	"堅強 (Strong)" (固執 Mandarin Version)		5:47
10.	"一公升的眼淚 (One Liter of Tears)" (車匙 Mandarin Version)		3:59

=== Collector edition ===
Jason Chan released First Experience: Collector Edition on October 29, 2007. The album contains same tracks plus 2 additional tracks and a DVD.

No.	Title	Length
1.	"永久保存 (Permanent Preservation)"	3:44
2.	"最佳努力獎 (Best Effort Award"	3:36
3.	"固執 (Stubborn)"	5:46
4.	"斷絕來往 (Terminate our Contact)"	3:32
5.	"車匙 (Car Keys)"	3:25
6.	"認命 (Resign to Fate)"	3:08
7.	"萬中無一"	4:10
8.	"醫生的悲哀 (Doctor's Depression)"	3:45
9.	"不等於 (Not Equal To)"	3:14
10.	"斷絕來往" (featuring 黃凱琪)	3:34
11.	"堅強 (Strong)"	5:47
12.	"一公升的眼淚 (One Litre of Tears)"	3:59
