= Ken Hung =

- Born: 2 March 1987 (age 39); British Hong Kong
- Occupation: Singer
- Years active: 2007–present

Chinese name
- Traditional Chinese: 洪卓立
Transcriptions
Standard Mandarin
- Hanyu Pinyin: Hóng Zhuólì
Yue: Cantonese
- Yale Romanization: Hùng Cheuklaahp
- Jyutping: Hung4 Coek3laap6
- Musical career
- Origin: Hong Kong
- Genres: Cantopop
- Label: Emperor Entertainment Group
- Website: Ken Hung's EEG Official Website

Kenneth Hung Cheuk Lap is a Hong Kong cantopop singer. He started his career after earning a second place in the EEG Singing Contest (aka 25th annual New Talent Singing Awards Hong Kong Regional Finals). During 2007, he went to help in the office for about 3–4 months cutting newspapers because his manager Mani Fok said he was too shy. Then he finally started recording songs, with his first song being "Love.gutless" (愛．無膽). His most notable song is "彌敦道" (Nathan Road) (2008).

During 2008, he suffered his first bout of hydrothorax, which stopped him from working for most of 2008 until the filming of Love is Elsewhere. However, the problem returned late in 2008, his condition deteriorated and he was hospitalized. He had to cease all work including the filming of the drama Prince & Princess 2 in Taiwan. He was later released from the hospital. He is now working on the promotion of the movie Happily Ever After.

== Discography ==
- 2007 – Love. Gutless (愛．無膽) – 19 July
- 2007 – Love. Gutless 2nd version (愛．無膽) – 7 September
- 2008 – Go – 23 January
- 2008 – Next Attraction – 30 October – Informations from his official blog
- 2010 – Taste of Love + Best Selections – 29 March
- 2010 – Precious Moment – 24 September
- 2011 – Penetration (透視) – 27 May
- 2012 – Grown Up – 21 March + Looking for a girl who knows me (找個懂我的女孩) – 6 July
- 2013 – All Around Us – 25 April

== Movies ==
- 2008 – Love Is Elsewhere (愛情萬歲) 17 April
- 2008 – Connected (保持通話) 25 September
- 2009 – Happily Ever After (很想和你在一起) 27 August
- 2010 – The Jade and the Pearl
- 2010 – Perfect Wedding
- 2011 – Love Is the Only Answer
- 2012 – Nightfall
- 2012 – Fortune Cookies
- 2013 – 4 in Life
- 2014 – As the Light Goes Out
- 2016 – The Mobfathers

== Series ==
- 2008 – Dressage To Win (盛裝舞步愛作戰) 14 June
- 2008 – Prince + Princess 2 (王子看見二公主) (Taiwan)
- 2010 – The Rippling Blossom (魚躍在花見)
- 2012 – Happy Marshal

== Awards ==
- 2006 – EEG Singing Contest (second place) (Refer to New Talent Singing Awards)
- 2007 – Commercial Radio Hong Kong "Best New Male Singer" – Gold Award
