= List of Hong Kong films of 2014 =

This article lists feature-length Hong Kong films released in 2014.

== Box office ==
The highest-grossing Hong Kong films released in 2014 by domestic box office gross revenue, are as follows:

Highest-grossing films released in 2014
Rank	Title	Domestic gross
1	Golden Chicken 3	HK$41,277,620
2	From Vegas to Macau	HK$33,563,074
3	The Monkey King	HK$25,639,054
4	As the Light Goes Out	HK$25,457,959
5	Overheard 3	HK$23,905,854
6	The Midnight After	HK$21,298,819
7	Hello Babies	HK$18,160,327
8	That Demon Within	HK$17,395,364
9	Temporary Family	HK$16,525,697
10	Naked Ambition 2	HK$16,070,641

== Releases ==
Title	Director	Cast	Genre	Notes
Aberdeen	Pang Ho-cheung	Louis Koo, Miriam Yeung, Gigi Leung, Eric Tsang	Drama	In theatres 8 May 2014
As the Light Goes Out	Derek Kwok	Nicholas Tse, Shawn Yue, Simon Yam, Hu Jun	Action / Drama	In theatres 2 January 2014
Black Comedy	Wilson Chin	Chapman To, Wong Cho-lam, Jim Chim, Kimmy Tong, Benz Hui, Shirley Yeung	Comedy	In theatres 20 March 2014
Break Up 100	Lawrence Cheng	Ekin Cheng, Chrissie Chau, Ivana Wong	Romance	In theatres 1 August 2014
But Always	Zou Xian	Nicholas Tse, Gao Yuanyuan	Romance	In theatres 4 September 2014
Delete My Love	Patrick Kong	Wong Cho-lam, Michael Hui, Ivana Wong, Michael Wong, Yuen Qiu, Jacqueline Chong, Alex Fong, Daniella Wang, Nancy Sit, Benz Hui, Lo Hoi-pang, Maria Cordero, Mimi Chu	Romantic comedy	In theatres 8 May 2014
Don't Go Breaking My Heart 2	Johnnie To	Louis Koo, Miriam Yeung, Gao Yuanyuan, Vic Chou, Daniel Wu, Ivana Wong, Zhang Jaiyi, Huang Yilin	Romantic comedy	Entered into the 2014 Toronto International Film Festival; In theatres 13 November 2014
Dot 2 Dot	Amos Why	Moses Chan, Meng Tingyi, David Siu, Siu Yam-yam, Lam Chi-chung	Drama	Entered into the 2014 Hong Kong International Film Festival; In theatres 30 October 2014
Enthralled	Chip Tsao	Kelvin Kwan, Chui Tien-you, Candy Luo, Mandy Lieu	Drama	In theatres 10 April 2014
Flirting in the Air	Aman Chang	Chapman To, Dada Chan, Lam Chi-chung	Comedy	In theatres 1 October 2014
From Vegas to Macau	Wong Jing	Chow Yun-fat, Nicholas Tse, Chapman To, Jing Tian, Kimmy Tong	Action / Crime / Comedy	In theatres 30 January 2014
Gangster Payday	Lee Po-cheung	Anthony Wong, Charlene Choi, Wong You-nam, Michael Chan, Frankie Ng, Philip Keung, Deep Ng, Wilson Tsui, Joe Cheung, Carrie Ng, Arthur Wong, Law Wing-cheung	Action / Comedy	Entered into the 19th Busan International Film Festival; In theatres 6 November 2014
Golden Brother	Chung Shu-kai	Bosco Wong, William Chan, Michael Tse, King Kong Lee, Stephy Tang, Zhao Rong, Rose Chan, Timmy Hung, Liu Kai-chi, Sam Lee	Drama	In theatres 18 September 2014
Golden Chicken 3	Matt Chow	Sandra Ng, Andy Lau, Donnie Yen, Tony Leung Ka-fai, Louis Koo, Eason Chan, Anthony Wong, Nick Cheung, Ronald Cheng, Chapman To, Shawn Yue, Edison Chen, Dayo Wong, Alex To, Wyman Wong, Lo Hoi-pang, Jim Chim, Chin Ka-lok, William So, Hins Cheung, Cheung Siu-fai, Michelle Chen, Elena Kong	Comedy	In theatres 30 January 2014
Grey Met Shrek	Hui Shu-ning	Ronald Cheng, Annie Liu, Joel Chan, Macy Chan	Drama / Romance	In theatres 6 November 2014
Hello Babies	Vincent Kok	Raymond Wong, Sandra Ng, Eric Tsang, Ronald Cheng, Fiona Sit, Lynn Hung, Yu Bo, Karena Ng, Alex Lam	Comedy	In theatres 28 January 2014
Hong Kong Will Be Destroyed After 33 Years	Nero Ng		Short film	Released on YouTube on 3 March 2014
Horseplay	Lee Chi-ngai	Tony Leung Ka-fai, Ekin Cheng, Kelly Chen, Eric Tsang, Wong Cho-lam	Action / Comedy	In theatres 27 March 2014
Hungry Ghost Ritual	Nick Cheung	Nick Cheung, Annie Liu, Carrie Ng	Horror / Thriller	In theatres 10 July 2014
I Sell Love	Kevin Chu	Rose Chan, Pakho Chau, Liu Kai-chi, Mimi Kung	Drama / Romance	Entered into the 2014 Hong Kong Asian Film Festival; In theatres 4 December 2014
Iceman	Law Wing-cheung	Donnie Yen, Simon Yam, Huang Shengyi, Wang Baoqiang	Comedy / Action / Martial Arts	In theatres 25 April 2014
Impetuous Love in Action	Frankie Chan	Oscar Sun, Jade Lin, Kenneth Ma, Yu Shu, Frankie Chan, Irene Wan, Lisi Danni, Zheng Guolin	Romance / Comedy / Action	In theatres 23 May 2014 (China)
Just Another Margin	Jeffrey Lau	Betty Sun, Ronald Cheng, Ekin Cheng, Alex Fong, Lin Gengxin, Guo Degang, Yu Qian, Huang Yi, Patrick Tam, Lam Suet, Ada Choi, Lee Kin-yan, Hu Ge, Kingdom Yuen	Comedy	In theatres 2 February 2014
Kung Fu Angels	Herman Yau	Karena Ng, Jeremy Tsui, Alex Lam, Janelle Sing, Zhang Chuchu, Tats Lau, Johnson Yuen		In theatres 4 December 2014
Kung Fu Jungle	Teddy Chan	Donnie Yen, Wang Baoqiang, Charlie Young, Bai Bing, Alex Fong, Louis Fan, Xing Yu, David Chiang, Deep Ng, Christie Chen, Ji Huanbo, Jessica Wong, German Cheung, Yu Kang	Martial Arts / Action / Crime	In theatres 30 October 2014
Lan Kwai Fong 3	Wilson Chin	Whitney Hui, Ava Yu, Jeana Ho, Celia Kwok, Alex Lam, Jason Chan, Charles Ying, Christine Ng	Drama / Erotic	In theatres 2 January 2014
McDull - Me & My Mum	Brian Tse; Li Junmin	Sandra Ng, Anthony Wong, Babyjohn Choi, Huang Lei, Li Yundi, The Pancakes, Zhang Zhengzhong	Comedy / Animation / Family	In theatres 1 October 2014
The Monkey King	Soi Cheang	Donnie Yen, Chow Yun-fat, Aaron Kwok, Joe Chen, Peter Ho, Kelly Chen, Gigi Leung, Zhang Zilin, Monica Mok, Cheung Siu-fai, Hai Yitian, Liu Ye, Calvin Cheng, Him Law, Li Jing, Liu Hua, Irene Wang	Martial Arts / Action / Fantasy	In theatres 30 January 2014
The Midnight After	Fruit Chan	Simon Yam, Kara Hui, Chui Tien-you, Wong You-nam, Janice Man, Sam Lee, Lam Suet, Cheuk Wan Chi, Fiona Sit, Jan Curious, Mike Orange, Kitty Trouble, Waiting Soul, Les Hunter	Comedy / Horror	Entered into the 2014 Berlin International Film Festival; In theatres 10 April 2014
My Voice, My Life	Ruby Yang		Documentary	In theatres 16 October 2014
Naked Ambition 2	Lee Kung-lok	Chapman To, Josie Ho, Derek Tsang, Taka Kato, Tyson Chak, Maiko Yūki, Candy Yuen, Anri Okita, Tsukasa Aoi, Nozomi Aso, Yui Tatsumi, Kana Yume, Louis Koo, Sandra Ng, Charlene Choi, Wong Jing	Comedy / Erotic	In theatres 3 April 2014
Once Upon a Time in Shanghai	Wong Ching-po	Sammo Hung, Philip Ng, Andy On, Jiang Luxia	Martial Arts	In theatres 10 January 2014
Overheard 3	Alan Mak; Felix Chong	Sean Lau, Louis Koo, Daniel Wu, Zhou Xun, Gordon Lam, Alex Fong, Ng Man-tat, Kenneth Tsang, Dominic Lam, Michelle Ye, Huang Yi	Action / Crime / Drama	In theatres 5 June 2014
Police Story 2013	Ding Sheng	Jackie Chan, Huang Bo, Liu Ye, Jing Tian	Action	In theatres 16 January 2014
Probation Order	Tony Leung	Liu Kai-chi, Hanjin Tan, Candy Lo, Michelle Yim	Drama	In theatres 2 August 2014
Revelation of Ghost Marriage	Meng Ong	Sandra Ng, Jim Chim, Wang Bo-chieh, Mark Lee	Comedy / Drama / Fantasy	In theatres 4 December 2014
Rise of the Legend	Roy Chow	Sammo Hung, Tony Leung Ka-fai, Simon Yam, Peng Yuyan, Angelababy, Jing Boran, Wong Cho-lam, Wang Luodan, Zhang Jin, Feng Jiayi, Qin Junjie, Ko Tai Yu, Byron Mann	Martial Arts	In theatres 27 November 2014
The Second Coming	Herman Yau; Ng Tin-chi	Joey Leong, Kenny Wong, Maggie Shiu, Don Li	Suspense / Horror	Entered into the 2014 Hong Kong International Film & TV Market
The Seventh Lie	James Hung	Ronald Cheng, Him Law, Josie Ho, Peggy Tseng, Benz Hui, Alex Lam, Evelyn Choi, Philip Keung, Tyson Chak, Lo Hoi-pang	Crime / Drama / Thriller	In theatres 30 October 2014
Sifu vs Vampire	Daniel Chan	Yuen Biao, Ronald Cheng, Philip Ng, Kelvin Kwan, Michelle Hu, Bella Lo, Jiang Luxia	Horror	In theatres 16 October 2014
Stories Forlorn	Uri L. Schwarz, Jason A. Sankey	Jason Tobin, Masson Ge, Oliver Williams, Kirt Kishita, Zac Dee, Jason Bradley	Coming-of-age / Thriller	In theatres 28 February 2014
Temporary Family	Cheuk Wan-chi	Nick Cheung, Sammi Cheng, Angelababy, Jacky Cheung, Dayo Wong, Myolie Wu, Ivana Wong	Romantic-comedy	In theatres 21 August 2014
That Demon Within	Dante Lam	Daniel Wu, Nick Cheung, Andy On, Liu Kai-chi	Crime	Entered into the 2014 Berlin International Film Festival; In theatres 18 April 2014
Three Charmed Lives	Francis Ng; Jung Woo-sung; Chang Chen	Cheng Taishen, Zhang Xinyuan, Andy Choi, Woo Sang-jeon, Shih Chin-hang, Wang Hsin-yuan	Drama	Entered into the 2014 Hong Kong International Film Festival; In theatres 15 August 2014
Twilight Online	Maggie To	Cheung Siu-fai, Babyjohn Choi, Lawrence Chou, Siu Yam-yam, Edmond Poon	Horror	In theatres 4 September 2014
Uncertain Relationships Society	Heiward Mak	Venus Wong, Anjo Leung, Kaman Kong, Siuyea Lo, Wong Yat-ho, Helen Ko, Lam Yiu-sing	Drama / Romance	In theatres 12 August 2014
Z Storm	David Lam	Louis Koo, Gordon Lam, Dada Chan, Liu Kai-chi, Lo Hoi-pang	Crime	In theatres 19 June 2014
The Taking of Tiger Mountain.	Tsui Hark	Zhang Hanyu, Tony Leung Ka-fai, Lin Gengxin, Yu Nan, Tong Liya, Chen Xiao	Action, biography	In theatres 23 December 2014

== See also ==
- 2014 in Hong Kong
