= List of Hong Kong films of 2016 =

This article lists feature-length Hong Kong films released in 2016.

== Box office ==
The highest-grossing Hong Kong films released in 2016 by domestic box office gross revenue, are as follows:

Highest-grossing films released in 2016
Rank	Title	Domestic gross
1	Cold War 2	HK$66,824,171
2	The Mermaid	HK$56,225,252
3	From Vegas to Macau III	HK$25,049,210
4	The Monkey King 2	HK$15,921,532
5	Line Walker	HK$10,982,286
6	Call of Heroes	HK$10,282,450
7	The Bodyguard	HK$9,815,303
8	Finding Mr. Right 2	HK$9,563,371
9	Trivisa	HK$9,302,142
10	S Storm	HK$8,744,449

== Releases ==
Title	Director	Cast	Genre	Notes
The Bodyguard	Sammo Hung	Sammo Hung, Andy Lau, Zhu Yuchen, Li Qinqin	Action / Martial Arts	In theaters 1 April 2016
Buddy Cops	Peter Chik	Bosco Wong, King Kong Li, Charmaine Fong, Kate Tsui, Gordon Lam, Stanley Fung	Action / Crime / Comedy	In theaters 21 April 2016
Bully	Kevin Lee; Roy Kwan	Meiling Tung, Brandy Lim, Hank Yip, Leni Cho, Chau Wai-kwong, Kavi Yau, Kris Law, Irina Tang	Suspense / Drama	In theaters 3 March 2016
Call of Heroes	Benny Chan	Sean Lau, Louis Koo, Peng Yuyan, Wu Jing, Yuan Quan, Jiang Shuying, Liu Kai-chi, Philip Keung, Berg Ng, Sammy Hung	Action	In theaters 18 August 2016
Cold War 2	Sunny Luk; Longman Leung	Aaron Kwok, Tony Leung Ka-fai, Charlie Young, Janice Man, Chow Yun-fat, Eddie Peng, Bibi Zhou, Aarif Rahman, Tony Yang, Ma Yili	Crime	In theaters 8 July 2016
Crouching Tiger, Hidden Dragon: Sword of Destiny	Yuen Woo-ping	Donnie Yen, Michelle Yeoh	Wuxia	In theaters 19 February 2016
Drink Drank Drunk	Takkie Yeung	Carlos Chan, Ken Hung, Deep Ng, Michelle Wai, Kathy Yuen, Maggie Shiu	Comedy	In theaters 24 November 2016
Fooling Around Jiang Hu	Lam Chiu-wing	Alan Tam, Jordan Chan, Christine Ng, Jamie Chik, Babyjohn Choi, Jacky Cai, Hedwig Tam	Comedy	In theaters 1 September 2016
From Vegas to Macau III	Andrew Lau; Wong Jing	Chow Yun-fat, Andy Lau, Nick Cheung, Li Yuchun, Jacky Cheung, Carina Lau, Charles Heung, Jacky Heung, Michelle Hu	Action / Comedy	In theaters 6 February 2016
The Gigolo 2	Venus Keung	Dominic Ho, Connie Man, Alex Lam, Iris Chung, Teresa Mak, Hazel Tong, Winnie Leung, Tony Ho, Samuel Leung	Erotic / Drama	In theaters 14 January 2016
Girl of the Big House	Aman Chang	Angela Wang, Francis Ng, Miriam Yeung, Jim Chim, Yuen Qiu	Comedy / Action	In theaters 4 August 2016
Good Take!	Derek Tsang; Henri Wong; Vernie Yeung; Wong Chun; Wong Ching-po	Alex Fong, Pakho Chau, Cheung Siu-fai, Jessica Hsuan, Lo Hoi-pang, Lam Suet, Sam Lee, Cherrie Ying, Charlene Choi, Michael Miu	Horror	In theaters 14 April 2016
Good Take Too	Chung Cho-kiu; Clement Cheng; Heiward Mak; Tong Ka-wai	Eric Tsang, Charmaine Fong, Edison Chen, Venus Wong, Tien Niu, Chui Tien-you, Felix Wong	Drama	In theaters 26 May 2016
Happiness	Andy Lo	Kara Hui, Carlos Chan, Cya Liu, Louis Cheung, Yan Ng, James Ng, Lawrence Chou, Lam Siu-ha, Chin Siu-ho, Teresa Mak, Stephanie Che, Siu Yam-yam	Drama	In theaters 8 September 2016
Heartfall Arises	Ken Wu	Nicholas Tse, Sean Lau, Tong Liya, Mavis Fan	Crime	In theaters 20 October 2016
Heaven in the Dark	Steve Yuen	Jacky Cheung, Karena Lam, Michelle Wai, Catherine Chau, Wong He, Anthony Wong, Edmond So, Law Lan	Drama	In theaters 24 March 2016
House of Wolves	Vincent Kok	Francis Ng, Ronald Cheng, Jiang Shuying	Comedy	In theaters 21 January 2016
iGirl	Kam Ka-wai	Ekin Cheng, Chrissie Chau, Dominic Ho, Connie Man, Lam Chi-chung, Joyce Cheng	Romance	In theaters 10 March 2016
Kidnap Ding Ding Don	Wilson Chin	Ivana Wong, Alex Fong, Kabby Hui, Shek Sau, Mimi Kung, Hui Shiu-hung, Mimi Chu, Elena Kong, Bob Lam, Emily Kwan, Alycia Chan	Comedy / Romance	In theaters 23 June 2016
Kill Time	Fruit Chan	Angelababy, Ethan Juan, Juck Zhang, Rayza, Hao Lei, Pan Hong, Yin Zhusheng, Huang Jue, Kou Zhenhai, Lam Suet, Song Ning	Crime / Thriller	In theaters 10 March 2016
L for Love, L for Lies Too	Patrick Kong	Stephy Tang, Louisa Mak, Dominic Ho, Elaine Jin, Paw Hee-ching	Romance	In theaters 22 December 2016
League of Gods	Wilson Yip; Koan Hui	Jet Li, Fan Bingbing, Huang Xiaoming, Angelababy, Louis Koo, Wen Zhang, Jacky Heung, Tony Leung Ka-fai, Zu Feng, Andy On, Xu Qing	Action / Fantasy / Martial arts	In theaters 29 July 2016
Line Walker	Jazz Boon	Nick Cheung, Louis Koo, Francis Ng, Charmaine Sheh, Benz Hui, Stefan Wong, Océane Zhu, Jade Leung, Li Guangjie, Zhang Huiwen	Crime	In theaters 11 August 2016
Love in Late Autumn	Lim Kah-wai	Irene Wan, Patrick Tam, Zhao Bingrui, Charmaine Fong, Wang Jiancheng	Romance / Drama	In theaters 21 January 2016
Mad World	Wong Chun	Shawn Yue, Eric Tsang	Drama	In theaters 31 January 2017; Entered into the 2016 Toronto International Film Festival
The Menu	Ben Fong	Gregory Wong, Catherine Chau, Kate Yeung, Ng Man-tat, Akina Fong, Justin Cheung, Benji Chiang	Drama	In theaters 4 August 2016
The Mobfathers	Herman Yau	Chapman To, Gregory Wong, Philip Keung, Anthony Wong, Danny Summer, Kathy Yuen, Wylie Chiu, Carlos Chan, Coco Chan	Crime	In theaters 31 March 2016; Entered into the 2016 Hong Kong International Film Festival
The Moment	Wong Kwok-fai	Gordon Lam, Dada Chan, Eric Suen, Kelvin Kwan, Eric Kwok, Poon Chan-leung, Grace Yip, Carmen Kong	Drama	In theaters 16 September 2016
The Monkey King 2	Cheang Pou-soi	Aaron Kwok, Gong Li, Feng Shaofeng, Xiaoshenyang, Him Law, Kelly Chen, Fei Xiang	Action / Fantasy	In theaters 8 February 2016
My Wife is a Superstar	Shirley Yung	Annie Liu, Pakho Chau, Alex Lam, Jacky Cai	Romance / Drama	In theaters 21 April 2016
Nessun Dorma	Herman Yau	Gordon Lam, Janice Man, Andy Hui, Candice Yu, Wilfred Lau	Psychological thriller	In theaters 27 October 2016; Entered into the 2016 Hong Kong International Film Festival
Operation Mekong	Dante Lam	Zhang Hanyu, Eddie Peng, Joyce Feng	Crime / Action	In theaters 6 October 2016
PG Love	Charlie Choi	Angie Shum, Jacqueline Chong, Anita Chui, Jumbo Tsang, Bella Law, Alycia Chan	Drama	In theaters 25 February 2016
Poor Rich Dad	Alfred Cheung	Kevin Cheng, Annie Liu, Li Chengyuan	Drama	In theaters 10 November 2016 (China)
Robbery	Fire Lee	Derek Tsang, J. Arie, Lam Suet, Stanley Fung, Philip Keung, Anita Chui, Eric Kwok, Aaron Chow, Edward Ma, Ken Lo		In theaters 14 April 2016
S Storm	David Lam	Louis Koo, Julian Cheung, Vic Chou, Ada Choi, Dada Chan, Derek Tsang	Crime / Thriller	In theaters 15 September 2016
Shed Skin Papa	Roy Szeto	Francis Ng, Louis Koo, Jessie Li, Jacky Cai, Kristal Tin	Comedy / Drama	Entered into the 2016 Tokyo International Film Festival
Show Me Your Love	Ryon Lee	Paw Hee-ching, Raymond Wong Ho-yin, Ivana Wong, Michelle Wai	Drama	In theaters 24 November 2016
Sisterhood	Tracy Choi	Gigi Leung, Fish Liew, Jennifer Yu	Drama	In theaters 23 February 2017; Entered into the 1st International Film Festival and Awards Macao
Skiptrace	Renny Harlin	Jackie Chan, Fan Bingbing, Johnny Knoxville	Action / Comedy	In theaters 21 July 2016 (China)
Sky on Fire	Ringo Lam	Daniel Wu, Joseph Chang, Amber Kuo, Zhang Jingchu, Cheung Siu-fai, Jiang Haowen, Wayne Lai, Jim Chim	Action / Thriller	In theaters 25 November 2016
Special Female Force	Wilson Chin	Jeana Ho, Eliza Sam, Cathryn Lee, Joyce Cheng, Mandy Ho, Anita Chui, Chris Tong, Wamg Royi, Jacky Choi	Action / Comedy	In theaters 13 October 2016
The Taste of Youth	Cheung King-wai		Documentary	In theaters 3 April 2016; Entered into the 2016 Hong Kong International Film Festival
Three	Johnnie To	Louis Koo, Zhao Wei, Wallace Chung	Action	In theaters 14 July 2016
Trivisa	Frank Hui; Vicky Wong; Jevons Au	Gordon Lam, Richie Jen, Jordan Chan, Lam Suet	Crime / Thriller	In theaters 7 April 2016; Entered into the 66th Berlin International Film Festival and 2016 Hong Kong International Film Festival
Weeds on Fire	Chan Chi-fat	Lam Yiu-sing, Liu Kai-chi, Tony Wu, Hedwig Tam, Poon Chan-leung	Sports / Drama	In theaters 25 August 2016; Entered into the 2016 Hong Kong International Film Festival
Sword Master	Derek Yee	Lin Gengxin, Peter Ho, Jiang Yiyan, Jiang Mengjie	Action, wuxia	In theaters 2 December 2016 Entered the 11th Rome Film Festival and 53rd Golden Horse Film Festival

== See also ==
- 2016 in Hong Kong
