= Gigolo (disambiguation) =

A gigolo is a male escort or companion who is supported by a woman in a continuing relationship, or to a number of women serially, over a period of time.

Gigolo or gigolos may also refer to:

- A male prostitute who is paid for sexual services to either women or men

== Music ==
- The Gigolo (album), a 1965 hard bop jazz album by trumpeter Lee Morgan
- "Gigolo" (Elena Paparizou song), 2006
- "Gigolo" (Mary Wells song), 1981
- "Gigolo" (Nick Cannon song), 2003
- "Gigolo" (The Damned song), 1987
- "Gigolo", a song by Miss Kittin & The Hacker from Champagne
- "Gigolo", a song by Thomas Anders and Uwe Fahrenkrog-Petersen, 2011
- "Gigolo", a song by bbno$, 2025

== Films ==
- Gigolo (1926 film), a silent film starring Rod La Rocque
- Gigolo (1951 film), a French drama film
- The Gigolo (1960 film)
- Deuce Bigalow: Male Gigolo, a 1999 American comedy film
- The Gigolos, a 2006 film
- The Gigolo (2015 film), Hong Kong film
  - The Gigolo 2

== Other ==
- Gigolo FRH (1983–2009), a dressage horse
- Gigolos, a 2011 Showtime television series
- Gigolo (video game), released in 1982

== See also ==
- Just a Gigolo (disambiguation)
