= L Storm =

2018 Hong Kong film by David Lam

- Official film poster
- Traditional Chinese: L風暴
- Simplified Chinese: L风暴
- Hanyu Pinyin: L Fēng Bào
- Jyutping: L Fung1 Bou6
- Directed by: David Lam
- Screenplay by: Wong Ho-wa; Ho Man-lung
- Story by: David Lam
- Produced by: Raymond Wong
- Starring: Louis Koo; Julian Cheung; Kevin Cheng; Stephy Tang; Patrick Tam; Michael Tse; Adam Pak
- Cinematography: Zhang Ying
- Edited by: Poon Hung
- Music by: Anthony Chue
- Production companies: Pegasus Motion Pictures; Huace Media; Wanda Media; Er Dong Pictures MY Pictures Studio; Beijing Youpin Investment Fund; Shanghai Tencent Pictures Culture Media; Zhongqing Xingying Media; CF Tide Films; Wishart Communication
- Distributed by: Pegasus Motion Pictures
- Release date: 23 August 2018
- Running time: 90 minutes
- Country: Hong Kong
- Language: Cantonese
- Budget: US$5-10 million
- Box office: US$64.52 million

L Storm is a 2018 Hong Kong action thriller film directed by David Lam, and starring Louis Koo and Julian Cheung, alongside Kevin Cheng, Stephy Tang, Patrick Tam, Michael Tse and Adam Pak in his debut film role.

The third installment in a pentalogy, preceded by Z Storm (2014) and S Storm (2016), and succeeded by P Storm (2019) and G Storm (2021), L Storm was theatrically released in Hong Kong on 23 August 2018.

== Plot ==
Independent Commission Against Corruption (Hong Kong) (ICAC) investigator William Luk and Joint Financial Intelligence Unit (JFIU) officer Lau Po-keung are respectively investigating a corruption and money laundering case both involving Customs officer Tik Wai-kit, but are unable to find any clues. At this time, Kenny Ching of ICAC's L Team (Internal Disciplinary Investigation Team) receives a report from Eva Ng, claiming Luk has accepted a bribe of HK$12 million. Unable to provide an explanation, Luk was immediately suspended from his duties.

Lau discovers that Luk was framed which is inextricably linked to the money laundering case he has been investigating. At the same time, Lau also suspects bank director Thompson Yau (Adam Pak) assisting the mastermind of a criminal organisation, Wong Hoi-wo, in money laundering. Chinese Anti-Corruption Bureau Director Hong Liang arrives in Hong Kong and to provide important intel for Lau, revealing that mainland Chinese corrupt officials are involved in the money laundering case. Luk risks his safety to collect evidence to prove his innocence, but was imprisoned.

== Cast ==
- Louis Koo as William Luk (陸志廉)
- Julian Cheung as Lau Po-keung (劉保強)
- Kevin Cheng as Kenny Ching (程德明)
- Stephy Tang as Eva Ng (吳頌華)
- Patrick Tam as Wong Hoi-wo (王海禾)
- Michael Tse as Tik Wai-kit (狄偉杰)
- Adam Pak as Thompson Yau (遊子新)
- Louis Cheung as Ho Tai-sing (何大成)
- Babyjohn Choi as Cel Chan (陳俊輝)
- Janelle Sing as Tammy Tam (譚美莉)
- Liu Kai-chi as Tsui Yau-choi (徐有才)
- Lo Hoi-pang as Uncle Kwai-hing (貴興叔)
- Law Lan as Raymond Chan's mother
- Evergreen Mak as Yeung Ching-fook (楊正福)
- Ding Haifeng as Hong Liang (洪亮)
- Toby Chan as Cindy Lee (李慧雅)
- Deno Cheung as Leung (細良)
- Alan Luk as Choi (蔡仔)
- Feng Lei as Zhang Peng (張鵬)
- Sienna Li as Zhao Meixin (招美欣)
- Jessica Hsuan as Dr. Anson Au (區嘉雯)
- Eddie Kwan as Yu Sir (余Sir)
- Kam Hing-yin as Lau Po-keung's supervisor
- Kumer So as Leopard (豹哥)
- Timothy Cheng as Hanson Lam (林希聖)

== Production ==
Principal photography for L Storm began on 21 August 2017 in Tuen Mun, Hong Kong. Filming wrapped up on 23 October 2017 after filming its final action scene on a yacht involving actors Louis Koo and Kevin Cheng hunting down criminals while the crew also celebrated Koo's 47th birthday, which occurred two days before.

== Box office ==
L Storm grossed a total of HK$442 million.

In Hong Kong, the film grossed s total of HK$17,412,266 during its theatrical run from 23 August to 21 October 2018, making it the four highest-grossing domestic film in the territory of 2018.

In China, the film grossed a total of ¥442,986,000.
