= P Storm =

2019 Hong Kong film by David Lam

- Film poster
- Traditional Chinese: P風暴
- Simplified Chinese: P风暴
- Hanyu Pinyin: P Fēng Bào
- Jyutping: P Fung1 Bou6
- Directed by: David Lam
- Screenplay by: Wong Ho-wa; Ho Man-lung
- Story by: Raymond Wong
- Produced by: Raymond Wong; Wayne Jiang
- Starring: Louis Koo; Kevin Cheng; Raymond Lam; Gordon Lam; Chrissie Chau
- Cinematography: Joe Chan
- Edited by: Poon Hung-yiu
- Music by: Anthony Chue
- Production company: Mandarin Motion Pictures
- Distributed by: Mandarin Motion Pictures
- Release date: 4 April 2019
- Running time: 96 minutes
- Country: Hong Kong
- Languages: Cantonese; Mandarin
- Budget: US$10-25 million
- Box office: US$118 million

P Storm is a 2019 Hong Kong action thriller film directed by David Lam, and starring Louis Koo, Kevin Cheng, Raymond Lam, Gordon Lam and Chrissie Chau. The fourth installment in a pentalogy, preceded by Z Storm (2014), S Storm (2016) and L Storm (2018), Koo reprises his role as ICAC principal investigator William Luk, who goes undercover in prison to investigate a case of corrupt prison officers receiving bribes. The film was released on 4 April 2019.

A fifth and final installment, titled G Storm, was released on 31 December 2021.

== Plot ==
Natalie Liu reports second generation rich heir Cho Yuen-yuen to the Independent Commission Against Corruption (Hong Kong) (ICAC) for bribing prison officers for parole. William Luk goes undercover as a prisoner to investigate the case, while being aided by his colleague Kenny Ching, and friend, Joint Financial Intelligence Unit (JFIU) officer Lau Po-keung the outside of prison.

In prison, Luk encounters old rival, Wong Man-ban, whom he imprisoned five years ago. Wong has become a major gang leader within the prison and is bent on seeking revenge on Luk. Prison superintendent Shum Kwok-keung, who accepts bribes from Cho, turns a blind eye on prison scuffles. Fortunately, Luk was able to find assistance from fellow inmate Wong Lam-luk, a well-meaning young man who seeks refuge in prison to avoid high living expenses.

== Cast ==
- Louis Koo as William Luk (陸志廉), principal investigator of the Independent Commission Against Corruption (Hong Kong) (ICAC) who goes undercover in prison under the guise of a DUI charge to investigate prison officers accepting bribes from Cho Yuen-yuen, who also murdered Luk's high school principal, Liu Muk-chi.
- Kevin Cheng as Kenny Ching (程德明), Luk's colleague who was formerly the chief investigator of Internal Disciplinary Investigation Team, who takes over Luk's duties as pricinpal investigator during the latter's undercover stint.
- Raymond Lam as Cho Yuen-yuen (曹元元), a second generation rich heir who was imprisoned three years ago for the murder of Liu Muk-chi in order to obtain his farm land in the New Territories. He gives bribes to prison officers in order to obtain a granted parole.
- Gordon Lam as Wong Man-ban (黃文彬), former superintendent of the Commercial Crime Bureau division of the Hong Kong Police Force who was imprisoned by Luk in 2014 during the events of Z Storm. Wong has become a major prison gang leader in rival with Cho and is also bent on settling the score with Luk.
- Chrissie Chau as Natalie Liu (廖雨萍), Liu Muk-chi's granddaughter who was who prosecutes Cho for the murder of her grandfather, and is constantly harassed by Cho's henchmen as a result.
- Louis Cheung as Wong Lam-luk (王藍祿), a well-meaning inmate who Luk befriends who constantly gets himself into prison from minor demeanors to avoid the high expenses of living outside.
- Patrick Tam as Shum Kwok-keung (沈國強), superintendent officer of Chek O Prison who accepted multiple bribes from Cho.
- Dada Chan as Donut Ma (馬冬娜), Wong Luk-lam's girlfriend who is pregnant with his child.
- Babyjohn Choi as Cel Siu (蕭光漢), an ICAC officer and Luk's subordinate.
- Liu Kai-chi as Yiu Kwan-ho (姚君豪), a barrister who works for Cho and uses the latter's illegitimate father Yuan Zhengyuan's charity foundation as a cover-up to bribes prison officers.
- Wilson Tsui as Chin Kwok-fung (錢國豐), a senior prison officer and Shum's subordinate who accepted bribes from Cho.
- Lo Hoi-pang as Liu Muk-chi (廖牧之), Natalie's grandfather and Luk's former high school principal who was murdered by Cho.
- Anika Sheng as Tammy Tam (譚美莉), an ICAC officer and Luk's subordinate.
- Stefan Wong as Tony Cheung (張坤), Cho's chief henchman who constantly harasses Natalie.
- Deno Cheung as Wong Hoi-leung (黃海良), an ICAC officer and Luk's subordinate.
- Justin Cheung as Nadal (拿度), a prisoner and Cho Yuen-yuen's right-hand man.
- Adam Pak as Wong Ka-on (王家安), a newcomer prison officer who reports on Shum and Chin to the ICAC for accepting bribes and also assists Luk on his mission.
- Ding Haifeng as Hong Liang (洪亮), director of China's Anti-Corruption Bureau.
- Monna Liu as Ding Rou (丁柔), an investigator of the Supreme People's Procuratorate
- Kevin Chu as Cheung Ming-chi (張明志), Wong Man-ban's underling in prison.
- Kumer So as Tai Yiu-sai (戴耀西), Cho's henchman who was imprisoned with Cho for executing his boss's plot in the order of Liu.
- Shek Sau as the Commissioner of correctional services who collaborates with the ICAC to investigate corrupt prison officers
- Manna Chan as Cho Pak (曹白), Cho Yuen-yuen's mother and Yuan Zhengyuan's mistress.
- Eddie Kwan as Yu Sir (余Sir), director of investigation of the ICAC.
- Daniel Sit as auction house manager.
- Julian Cheung as Lau Po-keung (劉保強), chief inspector of the Joint Financial Intelligence Unit (JFIU) and Luk's friend.
- Aaron Chow as Mark Cheung (張偉恆), an ICAC investigator and Ching's subordinate.
- Ken Law as Derek Law (羅仲文), an ICAC investigator and Ching's subordinate.
- Terry Zou as Jacky Chow (鄒文彬), an ICAC investigator and Ching's subordinate.
- Suen Lik-man as Yuan Zhengyun (袁正雲), Cho Yuen-yuen's illegitimate father who is middleman for corrupt mainland Chinese officials.
- Lo Mang as Uncle Four (謝老四), a prison inmate.

== Reception ==
=== Critical ===
Edmund Lee of the South China Morning Post gave the film a score of 2/5, noting its unrealistic plotting and script. Gabriel Chong of Movie Xclusive gave the film the score of 2.5/5 and criticized the large amount of subplots which lead to superficial characters, but praises the film's action sequences as being more bold than the previous installments of the film series.

=== Box office ===
P Storm grossed a total of US$117,991,727 worldwide, combining its box office gross from Hong Kong, China, United States, Australia, New Zealand and Vietnam.

In Hong Kong, the film grossed a total of HK$17,881,248 during its theatrical run from 4 April to 22 May 2019, making it the sixth highest-grossing domestic film of 2019 in the territory.

In China, the film grossed a total of ¥798,863,000 at the box office.
