= Pauline Chan =

Pauline Chan may refer to:

- Pauline Chan Bo-Lin (1973–2002), Hong Kong actress
- Pauline Chan (Australian actress) (born 1956), Australian actress, director, screenwriter and producer
