= House of Wolves =

House of Wolves may refer to:

- Destiny: House of Wolves, an expansion to the 2014 video game Destiny
- House of Wolves (film), a 2016 film
- "House of Wolves" (song), a song by My Chemical Romance from their third studio album The Black Parade
- The House of Wolves, a song in the Bring Me the Horizon album Sempiternal
