= 鴨王 =

鴨王, literally 'duck, king', may refer to:

- The Gigolo (2015 film), Hong Kong erotic drama film
- Kamo no Okimi, ancestor of the Kamo clan
