= G Storm =

2021 Hong Kong film by David Lam

- Film poster
- Traditional Chinese: G風暴
- Simplified Chinese: G风暴
- Hanyu Pinyin: G Fēng Bào
- Jyutping: G Fung1 Bou6
- Directed by: David Lam
- Screenplay by: Wong Ho-wah; Ronald Chan; Lui Koon Nam; Howard Yip
- Produced by: Raymond Wong
- Starring: Louis Koo; Julian Cheung; Kevin Cheng; Jessica Hsuan; Bosco Wong; Michael Tse
- Cinematography: Joe Chan
- Edited by: Poon Hung-yiu
- Music by: Anthony Chue
- Production company: Mandarin Motion Pictures
- Distributed by: Mandarin Motion Pictures
- Release date: 31 December 2021
- Running time: 93 minutes
- Country: Hong Kong
- Language: Cantonese
- Budget: US$14 million
- Box office: US$105.1 million (Note: See Box office)

G Storm is a 2021 Hong Kong action thriller film directed by David Lam. It is the fifth and final installment in a pentalogy, preceded by Z Storm (2014), S Storm (2016), L Storm (2018) and P Storm (2019), the film stars Louis Koo returning as ICAC investigator William Luk, who investigates a case in the Immigration Department which links to an international human trafficking ring.

The "G" in the film's title refers to both Group G, which is the Intelligence and Research Department of the ICAC, as well as the G4 department of the Hong Kong Police Force. G Storm was released on 31 December 2021.

== Plot ==
ICAC senior principal investigator William Luk delivers a presentation at the PanAsia Convention Against Corruption (PACAC) in W City. At the convention, his boss Yu Sir introduces him to the legal adviser of the SE Anti-corruption Association, Chief Justice of Asia Emma Pong, who plans to travel to Hong Kong next week to host a forum addressing the issue trafficking sex slaves. However, a female suicide bomber appears and holds Pong hostage; a group of terrorists led by Sirius appears and a gunfight ensues where Sirius kills the suicide bomber and Yu Sir. Luk then shoots Sirius dead, but the other terrorists escape as Luk runs out of ammunition.

Back in Hong Kong, the ICAC starts investigating the sex trafficking case while Luk's friend and informant, Wong Lam-luk snaps photos of senior customs inspector Kwong Yat-long discussing business with Chumook. The next day, Luk leads his squad, which includes Kenny Ching, on an operation to spy on Kwong at the Kwai Tsing Container Terminals. By night time, they notice sex slaves being unloaded from one of the containers. A gunfight ensues between the ICAC and the traffickers, while Luk's friend and police inspector Lau Po-keung arrives with his squad to back the ICAC. One of the slaves, whose younger sister was killed in the gunfight, reveals to the ICAC that they were from Thailand who were forced to work in clubs in Hong Kong. At the same time, Ching finds out that the fake passports found from the terminal had fake visas, which can only be made by the higher ups in the Immigration Department.

Ching later confronts his younger half-brother Ching Fei-hung, a customs officer who was also present at the terminal, but Fei-hung is tight-lipped. Through investigation, the police discovers that the terrorists at the PACAC and the terminal are led by King, a former drug lord of the Golden Triangle who is on Interpol's Red Notice, while Judge Pong has been sanctioning King and freezing his assets. Since Pong will arrive in Hong Kong in three days, Yu Hung-sing, the Director of Crime and Security Bureau, sets up an interdepartmental task force with Luk continuing on investigations while Lau is transferred to the G4 department to protect Pong's safety in Hong Kong. It turns out King works as a mercenary for the mastermind behind the international human trafficking syndicate, Siu Cheuk-ngah. Siu orders Chumook to kill every government official that they bribed, including Kwong.

Pong arrives in Hong Kong and Lau and his squad are assigned to protect her. On the way to the forum, they are ambushed by terrorists on the freeway, leading to a chase and shootout where Pong's assistant, Alice, is wounded. Lau suggests Pong to leave Hong Kong for her safety but she refuses, revealing to him that Alice was a victim of human trafficking and she insists on battling human trafficking issues. Later, Luk discovers Siu is also on Interpol's wanted list under one of his many alias and confronts Siu in the latter's company, who poses as a secretary while Chumook is the boss. Luk taunts Siu, who plays them and signals Chumook to silence Luk after the latter leaves.

Luk then gets a call from Lam-luk that his wife, Donut, is in danger and asks Luk to help him. However, it was actually a trick to lure Luk to a psychiatrist's office, where Lam-luk expresses his concern for Luk's mental health and suggests that Luk go to a therapy appointment. A suicide bomber suddenly comes out of the elevator – to protect his wife and child and others present, Lam-luk tackles the bomber back into the elevator and sacrifices himself in the explosion. Luk breaks down as it reminds him of his wife's death, who also died in an elevator six years ago.

Ching attempts to have Fei-hung confess his crimes but the latter refuses. Fei-hung is then chased by hitmen and Ching rescues Fei-hung and they flee from the hitmen. Ching then puts Fei-hung in a safety house and the brothers reconcile. Fei-hung finally confesses he was paid by Kwong to move the container full of slaves, which he was unaware of the contents, safely to the terminal. Luk, who has been suspecting Ching, arrives with his squad outside, but the brothers manage to evade them. However, a nearby car camera captures the brothers and Luk confronts Ching back in his office. Luk persuades Ching to tell his brother turn himself in to the ICAC, and promises leniency.

Pong and Lau's squad arrive at the Hong Kong Cultural Centre where the forum will be taking place. Pong then receives a taunting call from Siu and it's revealed that Pong had accepted bribes from Siu in the past to conduct schemes. Siu then arrives at the ICAC with his lawyer to report all his crimes, which he blames on Chumook. Luk's subordinate Tammy also discovers through investigation that Pong was involved in money laundering through an offshore company and accepting bribes from Siu, so Luk rushes to the forum to protect Pong, who is the only witness that can pin Siu. At the forum, Pong confesses her father was a corrupt judge and that, after his death, she continued his corrupt dealings to protect his reputation until she found out his death was caused by those who bribed him. Luk arrives and discovers Fei-hung, who was kidnapped by the terrorists, strapped to a wheelchair with a bomb; a major shootout ensues with the ICAC and police against the terrorists while EOD officers disarm the bomb. The shootout moves to the Space Museum where King appears and manages to take Lau hostage, but Pong distracts King, and Luk wrestles his gun away. Noticing that King is about to detonate the explosives, Luk wrestles King down to buy time for everyone to leave the Space Museum before King finally detonates them. King and Luk die in the explosion.

Three months later, Siu manages to scapegoat all his crimes on Chumook, who is sentenced to fifteen years of prison. As they're walking out the court, Chumook is stabbed by the Thai slave whose sister was killed. When Siu smirks at Chumook, she takes the knife thrusted in her body and stabs Siu multiple times, fatally wounding him as she also dies from her wound. Pong is convicted with obstruction of justice, but due to her many years of service to the international society, she is only sentenced to three years of prison. Fei-hung is convicted of accepting bribes, but is only sentenced to two years of prison due to cooperation in solving the sex trafficking case.

== Cast ==
- Louis Koo as William Luk (陸志廉), senior principal investigator of the Independent Commission Against Corruption (Hong Kong) (ICAC).
- Julian Cheung as Lau Po-keung (劉保強), chief inspector of the VIP Protection Unit (Hong Kong) (G4) who was formerly part of the Joint Financial Intelligence Unit (JFIU).
- Kevin Cheng as Kenny Ching (程德明), principal investigator of the ICAC.
- Jessica Hsuan as Emma Pong (龐愛瑪), Chief Justice of Asia.
- Bosco Wong as Ching Fei-hung (程非熊), Kenny Ching's younger brother who is a corrupt officer of the Customs and Excise Department (Hong Kong) who accepted bribes from his boss, Kwong Yat-long.
- Michael Tse as Siu Cheuk-ngah (肖卓亞), the mastermind behind an international human trafficking syndicate with multiple passports under different names.
- Rosyam Nor as King (沙育), a former drug dealer who is now the leader of a terrorist organization and Siu's mercenary.
- Louis Cheung as Wong Luk-lam (王藍祿), Luk's friend whom he met in prison and works as an informant for Luk.
- Anika Sheng as Tammy Tam (譚美莉), an ICAC officer and Luk's subordinate.
- Liu Kai-chi as Kwong Yat-long (鄺逸朗), a senior Customs inspector who accepted bribes from Siu to smuggle sex slaves from Thailand to Hong Kong.
- Dada Chan as Donut Ma (馬冬娜), Wong Luk-lam's wife.
- Lo Hoi-pang as Kenny and Ching Fei-hung's father.
- Babyjohn Choi as Cel Siu (蕭光漢), an ICAC officer and Luk's subordinate.
- Deno Cheung as Wong Hoi-leung (黃海良), an ICAC officer and Luk's subordinate.
- Toby Chan as Cindy Lee (李慧雅), a G4 inspector and Lau's subordinate.
- Wilfred Lau as Si-hing (師兄), a G4 inspector and Lau's subordinate.
- Ding Haifeng as Hong Liang (洪亮), director of China's Anti-Corruption Bureau.
- Sienna Li as Chumook (初沐), Siu's underling.
- Kendy Cheung as a suicide bomber sent to kill Pong.
- Monna Liu as Ding Rou (丁柔), an investigator of the Supreme People's Procuratorate.
- Elisa Ye as Alice, Pong's assistant.
- Cheung Siu-fai as Yu Hung-sing (余洪盛), deputy commissioner of the ICAC and director of Crime & Security.
- Eddie Kwan as Yu Sir (余Sir), director of investigation of the ICAC.
- Justin Cheung as Sirius, a killer sent to go after Pong.
- Lee Fung as Siu's lawyer.

== Production ==
Filming for G Storm commenced in December 2019. On 16 December 2019, filming of an explosion scene took place in Tsim Sha Tsui which featured cast members Louis Koo, Julian Cheung, Kevin Cheng, Jessica Hsuan, Bosco Wong and Deno Cheung along with over 100 extra actors. Production for the film was paused beginning in January 2020 due to the COVID-19 pandemic and did not resume until June 2020. Production officially wrapped up by the end of June. As a result of the pandemic, filming of two major scenes which include an international conference and a large scale gunfight that was set to be filmed in Southeast Asia had to be cancelled and be shot in Hong Kong instead.

== Release ==
G Storm was theatrically released on 31 December 2021 in Hong Kong.

== Reception ==
=== Box office ===
As of 30 January 2022, G Storm has grossed a total of US$105.1 million worldwide combining its gross from Hong Kong (US$708,104), China (US$104.3 million), Taiwan (US$30,000), Australia (US$40,998) and New Zealand (US$10,100).

==== Hong Kong ====
In Hong Kong, the film grossed HK$3,499,474 (US$448,846) during its first three days of release, debuting at No. 5 on its opening weekend. On its second weekend, the film grossed HK$2,021,899, moving up to No. 4, and have grossed a total of HK$5,521,373 (US$708,104) so far. Re-released in Hong Kong on 21 April, the film accumulated a total gross of HK$5,657,223.

==== China ====
In China, the film grossed US$55.7 million during its first three days of release, debuting at No. 2 on its opening weekend. The film remained at No. 2 on its second weekend where it grossed US$24.7 million, and have grossed a total of US$80.4 million by then. During its third weekend, the film grossed US$10.2 million, remaining at No. 2 for three consecutive weeks, and have accumulated a total gross of US$90.6 million so by then. On its fourth weekend, the film grossed US$7.2 million, moving down to No. 3, and gave grossed a total of US$97.8 million by then. During its fifth weekend, the film stayed at No. 3 while grossing US$6.5 million and gives accumulated a total gross of US$104.3 million by then.

=== Taiwan ===
Opening on 14 January 2022 in Taiwan, the film grossed NT$470,000 (US$10,000) on its first two days of release, debuting at No. 10 on its opening weekend.

=== Critical reception ===
Edmund Lee of the South China Morning Post gave the film a score of 2/5 stars, criticising the film's slack story and illogical screenplay.
