= Five Books =

The Five Books may refer to:

- The Pentateuch, the first five books of the Bible
- The Panchatantra, an ancient Indian collection of animal fables

For series of five books, see Pentalogy.
