= First Shot (1993 film) =

1993 Hong Kong film by David Lam

- Film poster
- Traditional Chinese: 廉政第一擊
- Simplified Chinese: 廉政第一击
- Hanyu Pinyin: Lián Zhèng Dì Yī Jī
- Jyutping: Lim4 Zing3 Dai6 Jat1 Gik1
- Directed by: David Lam
- Screenplay by: Chan Kiu-ying; So Man-sing; Wong Ho-wa
- Produced by: David Lam
- Starring: Ti Lung; Maggie Cheung; Simon Yam; Waise Lee; Canti Lau; Andy Hui
- Cinematography: Wong Bo-man; Abdul M. Rumjahn
- Edited by: Poon Hung
- Music by: Lowell Lo
- Production company: David Lam Films
- Distributed by: Newport Entertainment
- Release date: 25 February 1993
- Running time: 104 minutes
- Country: Hong Kong
- Language: Cantonese
- Box office: HK$5,463,556 (Hong Kong)

First Shot is a 1993 Hong Kong crime film produced and directed by David Lam and starring Ti Lung, Maggie Cheung, Simon Yam, Waise Lee, Canti Lau and Andy Hui. The film tells the story of events that led to the formation of the ICAC in Hong Kong in 1974.

== Plot ==
During the early 1970s, the ICAC has not been established in Hong Kong yet and the city was swamped with corruption and widespread poverty. Police sergeant Wong Yat-chung (Ti Lung) is very upright and justice and refuses to partake with his corrupt colleagues and thus, he is marginalized from everyone else at the police station. During an operation, Wong's subordinate Sam Mok (Simon Yam) shoots Wong in the back heavily injuring him. Meanwhile, Governor Murray MacLehose delegates Sir Barry Drainage to investigate the corruption happening in Hong Kong. Drainage's assistant Annie Ma (Maggie Cheung) also enlists Wong for help. After investigating, Wong discovers that Mok was forced to shoot him earlier. Wong then recruits Mok alongside two elite cadets from the police academy to assist him in gathering evidence of corruption groups and begins Hong Kong's first strike against corruption.

== Cast ==
- Ti Lung as Wong Yat-chung
- Maggie Cheung as Annie Ma
- Simon Yam as Sam Mok
- Waise Lee as Faucet Lui
- Canti Lau as Yip Chun-wan
- Andy Hui as Lo Kam-shui
- Kam Hing-yin as Yip Fok, Anti-Corruption Division
- Betsy Cheung as Chung's ex-wife
- Bobby Yip as Chiu's hitman
- Kong Man-sing as Brother Ho
- Frankie Chan as Muscle
- Hoi Sang Lee as Chiu's man
- Chow Hong-chiu as Mak Kay
- Jamie Luk as Martial Arts Instructor
- Mantic Yiu as Helen
- Wong Wai-chi
- Leung Kam-san as Chan Ping
- Wong Wa-ho as Mini bus driver
- Jameson Lam as ICAC Agent
- Wong Chi-keung as Chiu's Bodyguard
- Tang Tai-wo as Chiu's Bodyguard
- Ho Wing-cheung as policeman
- Hui Si-man as Councillor
- Leung Kai-chi as At Restaurant Opening
- Wai Ching as Lui Lok
- Leung Chung
- Ling Chi-hung
- Wong Man-chun as Policeman
- Mak Shu-san
- Yu Ming-hin
- James M. Crockett
- Yuen Kam-gai

== Reception ==
Beyond Hollywood gave the film a negative review criticizing its lack of originality by directly lifting its plot, scenes and characters from Brian De Palma's The Untouchables and also criticizes its shoddy writing. Hong Kong Film Net rated the film 7 out of 10 stars and gave a positive review writing "The characters were enaging (especially Simon Yam's turn as a weaselly rat, a total 180 from the usual suave characters he plays), the story was interesting, and the action was pretty exciting. First Shot is really not that much different from many other similar movies (except that it is based -- albeit loosely -- on a true story), but it is done well and worth a look."

=== Box office ===
The film grossed HK$5,463,556 at the Hong Kong box office during its theatrical run from 25 February to 10 March 1993 in Hong Kong.
