= The Trouble-Makers =

2003 Hong Kong film by Aman Chang

- DVD cover
- Directed by: Aman Chang
- Written by: Leung Po-On
- Produced by: Benny Chan; Dickson Tang
- Starring: Terence Yin; Sam Lee; Maggie Q
- Production companies: B&S Films Creation Works House
- Release date: 17 April 2003 (Hong Kong)
- Running time: 84 minutes
- Country: Hong Kong
- Language: Cantonese

The Trouble-Makers (Chinese: 一屋兩火 Yat uk leung fo) is a 2003 Hong Kong Cantonese-language drama film directed by Aman Chang and starring actors Terence Yin, Sam Lee, and Maggie Q.

== Plot summary ==
Maggie plays Clary who rents a room in a Chinese flat. Terence Yin plays the romantic lead who is transferred into this Chinese town. The landlord, the cop & Clary set up a scam to scare Yin out of the house by making him believe it is haunted so they can rent it again. Yin moves to his Aunt's house who also sets up a scam of accusing him of taking advantage his cousin so she can have an excuse to boot him out of the house. With nowhere to go, he returns to his flat to discover the first scam. Yin's buddies set up retro-scam and pretend to take advantage of Q. She then scams the scammers, which results in Yin taking care of a catatonic Clary. After the plot bounces back & forth a few times, the frame freezes just as Yin leans in for the big kiss.

== Cast ==
- Terence Yin
- Sam Lee
- Maggie Q
- Lam Suet
