= Black Comedy (film) =

2014 Hong Kong film by Wilson Chin

- Hong Kong theatrical release poster
- Traditional Chinese: 黑色喜劇
- Simplified Chinese: 黑色喜剧
- Hanyu Pinyin: Hēi Sè Xǐ Jù
- Jyutping: Hak1 Sik1 Hei2 Kek6
- Directed by: Wilson Chin
- Written by: Wong Jing
- Produced by: Wong Jing
- Starring: Chapman To; Wong Cho-lam; Kimmy Tong
- Cinematography: Puccini Yu
- Edited by: Matthew Hu
- Music by: Ronald Ng; Chu Chun Kit
- Production company: Mega-Vision Pictures
- Distributed by: Mega-Vision Pictures; Gala Film Distributions
- Release date: 20 March 2014
- Running time: 90 minutes
- Country: Hong Kong
- Language: Cantonese
- Box office: HK$2,445,308

Black Comedy is a 2014 Hong Kong fantasy comedy film directed by Wilson Chin. It starred Chapman To, Wong Cho-lam and Kimmy Tong.

== Plot ==
Johnny Du Kei-Fung (Wong Cho-Lam) is a Hong Kong detective who dreams of becoming a member of the exclusive G4 Team that protects the city's Chief Executive (Patrick Dunn). Johnny is deemed too short for the team and his application is denied. At home, Johnny is bullied by his girlfriend Angel (Kimmy Tong) as weak and unsuccessful.

Johnny meets Vincent (Chapman To), who offers him three wishes in exchange for his soul. His first wish is to be pursued by a beautiful woman, whom Vincent delivers in the form of "Juicy" (also played by Kimmy Tong). Johnny soon discovers that Juicy is indiscriminately passionate, which makes him concerned about possible infidelity. In response, Johnny uses his second wish to turn Juicy into the innocent and unfailingly loyal QQ. He soon discovers, that QQ is unintelligent and is the daughter of triad figure Brother Drill (Tommy Wong), a coincidence that leads the police to believe he is a triad mole.

In order to change his superior's (Benz Hui) view of him, Johnny ventures into a drug lord's lair hoping to solve a case, but he is killed. Vincent uses Johnny's third wish to reincarnate him as a wealthy, arrogant businessman in order for Johnny to complete his quest, win back Angel and protect the Chief Executive.

== Cast ==
- Chapman To as Vincent, the Devil Prince
- Wong Cho-lam as Officer Johnny To
- Seth Leslie as Georgio
- Kimmy Tong as Angel / Juicy / QQ
- Jim Chim as Jim, the Angel
- Wilson Chin as April's lover
- Shirley Yeung as April
- Benz Hui as Johnny's superior
- Siu Yam-yam as The Mother of Hell
- Bob Lam as killer
- Evergreen Mak Cheung-ching as police
- Oscar Leung
- Patrick Dunn as Chief Executive of Hong Kong
- Alvina Kong
- Kingdom Yuen
- Ken Lo
- Yuen Cheung-yan
- Tommy Wong as Brother Drill
- Jerry Koo
- Jacqueline Chong
- Gill Mohindepaul Singh
- Lo Fan
- Gregory Wong as Ben
- Vanko Wong
- Tina Shek
- Calinda Chan
- Coffee Lam
- Lo Chung Yan
- Connie Man
- Doris Chow
- Ng Wan Po as policeman
- Fred Cheung as Cheung Chi Fung
- Hazel Tong
