= Z Storm =

2014 Hong Kong film by David Lam

- Official poster
- Traditional Chinese: Z風暴
- Simplified Chinese: Z风暴
- Hanyu Pinyin: Z Fēng Bào
- Jyutping: Z Fung1 Bou6
- Directed by: David Lam
- Screenplay by: Ho-Wah Wong
- Story by: David Lam
- Produced by: John Chong
- Starring: Louis Koo; Gordon Lam; Dada Chan; Michael Wong; Janelle Sing; Lo Hoi-pang
- Cinematography: Tony Cheung
- Edited by: Chi-Leung Kwong; Hung Poon
- Music by: Anthony Chue
- Production companies: Pegasus Motion Pictures; Sil-Metropole Organisation; LeVision Pictures
- Distributed by: Pegasus Motion Pictures Distribution
- Release date: 19 June 2014
- Running time: 92 minutes
- Country: Hong Kong
- Language: Cantonese
- Budget: HK$60 million (US$7.75 million)
- Box office: US$17.2 million

Z Storm (Chinese: Z風暴) is a 2014 Hong Kong action thriller film directed by David Lam, and starring Louis Koo, Gordon Lam and Dada Chan. The plot revolves around Hong Kong's Independent Commission Against Corruption (ICAC) and its investigation of a charity fund that has become involved in a Madoff-style ponzi scheme.

Co-produced by Pegasus Motion Pictures, Sil-Metropole Organisation and LeVision Pictures, it is the first installment in a pentalogy, succeeded by S Storm (2016), L Storm (2018), P Storm (2019) and G Storm (2021).

== Plot summary ==
This is a story about the biggest financial fraud attempted in Hong Kong, directed at the Government of Hong Kong and all 7 million Hong Kong citizens... no one is free from the scheme. Within the four decades of guarding Hong Kong's financial integrity, the ICAC has never come across an opponent so huge and so well organized as in the Z Torrent file... shadowy figures from the underworld of South America, Italy and Europe all ready to plot against the estimated 150 million dollars of Hong Kong citizens' tax money which was pooled in a fund called the Community Care Fund. High-profile chartered accountants, high ranking law enforcers, power lawyers, the super entrepreneurs; they all have their shares of play but none can really grasp the big picture; they are there only for what they desire most. When the wife of an up-rising star Superintendent of police force reported his corruption simply out of bitterness for being ill-treated, little did she know she is about to pull the head string from a very well weaved web of deceive, greed, sex, power, and last but not least, fear. The ICAC agent Luk who took charge of the simple complaint felt otherwise... it's his passion for justice that has been driving him all these years in the battle against bribery and corruption, even after losing his beloved wife. Further investigation soon revealed many unanswered questions and loose ends...the death of an ex-godfather status accountant of Hong Kong, the threats to even the seemingly harmless witnesses and informers, and the surfacing of a mysterious lady, all have connection with Luk's wanted list but with a background as simple and as tragic as a girl next door with cancer. As Luk dug deeper into the web, he is being hunted by trained foreign mercenaries; a tactic very seldom or never heard of in the history of Hong Kong's underworld! With the support of his superior the old but streetwise Deputy Chief of ICAC, Yu, Luk eventually unlocked the door to the plan, but only after a bloodbath gun battle which almost cost him his life and that of the attractive mysterious woman, Angel.

== Cast ==
- Louis Koo as William Luk (陸志廉)
- Gordon Lam as Wong Man-ban (黃文彬)
- Dada Chan as Angel Leung (梁安瑩)
- Michael Wong as Malcolm Wu (胡志勇)
- Janelle Sing as Tammy Tam (譚美莉)
- Lo Hoi-pang as Law Tak-wing (羅德永)
- Stephen Au as On Tat (安達)
- Derek Tsang as Joe Ma (馬繼祖)
- Cheung Siu-fai as Yu Hung-sing (余洪盛)
- Felix Lok as Tsui Wai-king (徐懷景)
- Liu Kai-chi as Cheung Keung (張強)
- Philip Keung as Ho Tak-wing (何德榮)
- Tony Ho as Stephen Shum (沈濟全)
- Deno Cheung as Siu-leung (細良/小良)
- Clement Tien as Pa (阿拔)
- Jenny Xu as Mrs. Luk
- Crystal Wang as Kong Wai-ling (黃江蕙玲)
- Rosanne Lui as Kong Wai-ling's mother
- Alfred Cheung as Edmond Wai (韋耀庭)
- May Law as Fan Law Pui-fong (范羅佩芳)
- Henry Fong as Tsang Yuk-ming (曾玉明)
- Joe Cheung as Chan Chi-choi (陳智才)
