= Raped by an Angel 2: The Uniform Fan =

1998 Hong Kong film by Aman Chang

- DVD cover
- Directed by: Aman Chang
- Written by: Wong Jing
- Produced by: Lee Siu-Kei; Wong Jing
- Starring: Athena Chu; Francis Ng; Jane Chung Chun
- Cinematography: Choi Sung Fai
- Edited by: Cheung Ka-fai; Azrael Chung Wai Chiu
- Music by: Marco Wan
- Production companies: Jing's Production; Young Filmmakers Ltd.
- Distributed by: Mei Ah Entertainment
- Release date: 6 March 1998
- Running time: 92 minutes
- Country: Hong Kong
- Language: Cantonese
- Box office: HK$10.237 million

Raped by an Angel 2: The Uniform Fan (Chinese: 強姦2制服誘惑) is a 1998 Category IIB Hong Kong film directed by Aman Chang, with a scenario by Wong Jing. It is the second installment of the Raped by an Angel film series.

== Cast ==
- Athena Chu as Po Wan Yu
- Francis Ng as "Bully" Tong Kee Kong
- Jane Chung Chun as "Jenny" Chung Bo Yu
- Yeung Faan
- Joe Ma as the Uniform Fan
- Chang Yin
- Ronald Wong Pan
- Ha Ping
- Rocky Lai Keung Kun
- Kong Foo Keung
- Chan Po Chun
- Aman Chang
- Mei Yee
- Ng Ka Wai
