= Girls Without Tomorrow 1992 =

1992 Hong Kong film by David Lam and Wong Chi

- Film poster
- Directed by: David Lam Tak Luk; Wong Chi
- Written by: Wong Chi; So Man-Sing
- Produced by: David Lam Tak Luk
- Starring: Carina Lau; Fung Bo-Bo; May Lo Mei-Mei; Vivian Chow; Pauline Chan
- Cinematography: Wong Po-Man; Abdul M. Rumjahn
- Edited by: Poon Hung
- Music by: Lowell Lo
- Production companies: David Lam Films Co., Ltd.
- Distributed by: Mandarin Films Distribution Co. Ltd.
- Release date: 17 May 1992 (Hong Kong)
- Running time: 101 minutes
- Country: Hong Kong
- Language: Cantonese
- Box office: HK$8,844,721 (Hong Kong)

Girls Without Tomorrow 1992 (應召女郎1988之二現代應召女郎) is a 1992 Hong Kong film directed by David Lam Tak Luk and Wong Chi. Carina Lau, Fung Bo-Bo, May Lo Mei-Mei, Vivian Chow and Pauline Chan act as five prostitutes in the story. It is a sequel to the 1988 film Girls Without Tomorrow.

== Plot ==
Hung is a prostitute of Hong Kong Temple Street. Her daughter, TV actress Siu Ling refuses to acknowledge her. However, Siu Ling's road to stardom made her betraying her body. Hung's foster daughter, Wah is a hot-tempered dancing girl in a night club, she always fought with clients and colleague and got herself in tough situations. Eva is the glamorous top model escort. Yuk become a call girl to fulfill her dream of studying abroad. They surrounded with fame and glory, middle class status, or just no status.

== Cast and roles ==
- Pauline Chan – Eva
- Ekin Cheng – Onn (credited as Dior Cheng)
- John Ching – Big Fly
- Andy Hui – Ling-Yuk's New Pimp
- Vivian Chow – Fong Siu-Ling
- Michael Dingo – Wang
- Fung Bo-Bo – Hung
- Rutherford John – Western Businessman 2
- Carina Lau – Wa
- Lau Siu-Ming – Li
- Mike Leeder – Western businessman
- Alan Chui Chung-San - Brother Two
- Waise Lee – Peter
- May Lo Mei-Mei – Yuen Ling-Yuk
- Shum Wai – Simon
- Yee Fn Wei – Drunk Actor
- Yung Sai-Kit – Man with Eye Trouble

== Box office ==
The film grossed HK$8,844,721 at the Hong Kong box office during its theatrical run from 30 July to 19 August 1992 in Hong Kong.

== Blu-ray reprint ==
This film was first released on Blu-ray Disc on 20 March 2020.

== See also ==
- Prostitution in Hong Kong
