= Dada Chan =

Hong Kong actress

- 陳靜
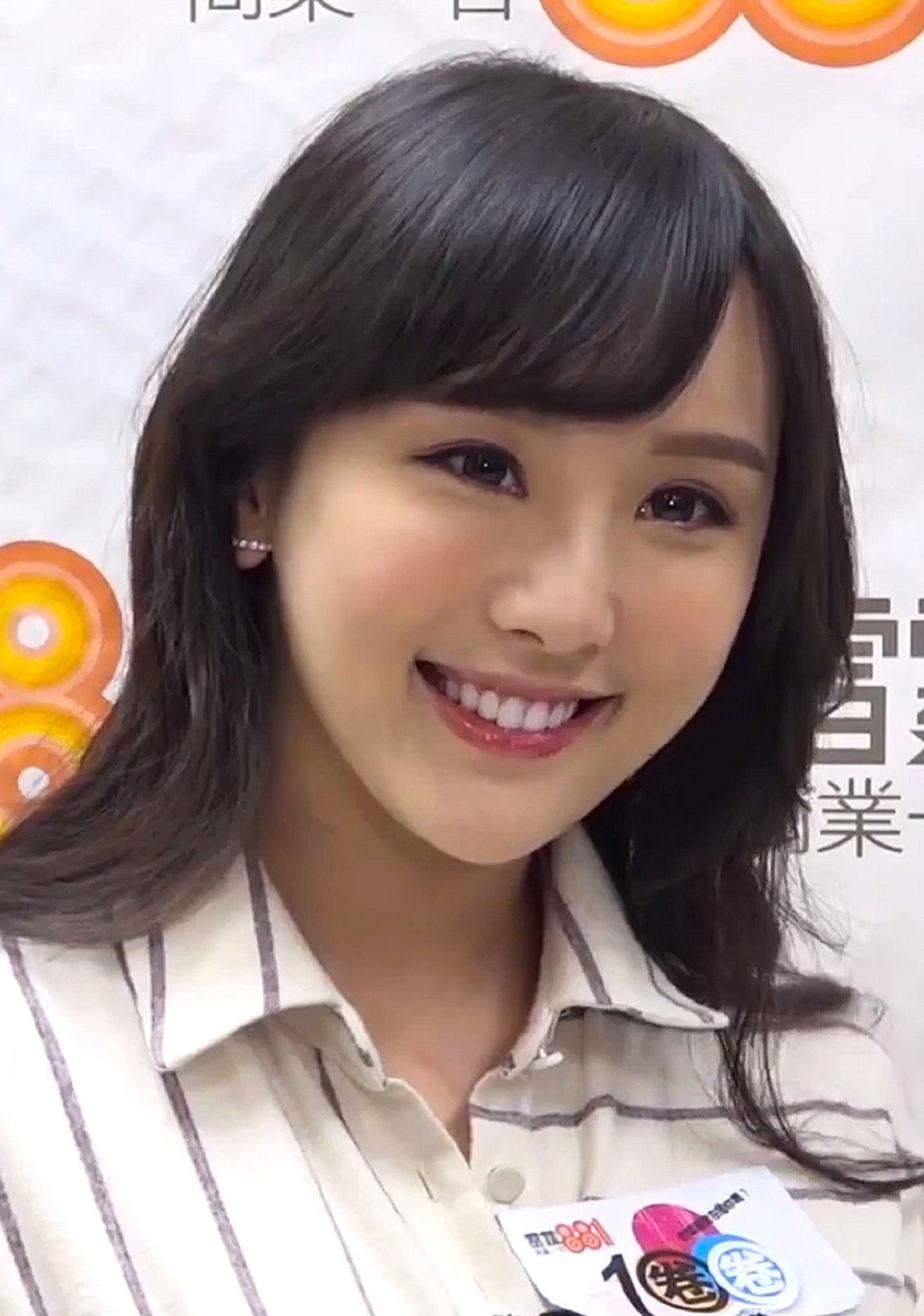
- Chan in 2019
- Born: Chan Ching; March 22, 1989 (age 37); Hong Kong
- Occupations: Actress; model
- Years active: 2007–present
- Modeling information
- Height: 1.67 m (5 ft 6 in)
- Hair color: Black
- Eye color: Dark brown
- Agency: Jacso Entertainment (2010–present)

Dada Chan (born 22 March 1989) is a Hong Kong actress and model under Jacso Entertainment based in Hong Kong.

== Entertainment career ==
In 2007, as a model, she was with Hong Kong singer Jason Chan shooting Tao-Ti green tea (道地百果园饮品) advertising. In 2010, she was together with Liz and Ayu shooting a Photo Album First Impression.

Followed by her increasing popularity, Dada began her acting career. In April 2011, she was in cooperation with her ex-boyfriend Gregory Wong starred in movie Lan Kwai Fong, In this film they played as a couple. She participated in the first domestic adult comedy movie Chase Our Love.

In 2012, she was in collaboration with Chapman To and Ronald Cheng performance Pang Ho Cheung movie Vulgaria and she won “Best Supporting Actress”; in 32nd Hong Kong Film Awards with the HK$30 million box office hit Vulgaria, which was also nominated for Best Supporting Actress in 49th Golden Horse Film Festival and Awards. In July, she participated in micro film 宅幸福, in film as the female lead.

Dada was the only Hong Kong representative selected for the Tokyo Girls Award A/W 2011 and Tokyo Girls Collection S/S 2012.

== Filmography ==
=== Film ===
Year	Name	Director	Role	Note
2008	Besieged City	Lawrence Ah Mon	Ceci	
2010	La Comédie Humaine	Hing-Ka Chan; Janet Chun	Actress	
2011	Chase Our Love	Yang Zi	Jing Jing	
2011	MicroSex Office	Jim Chim	Virgina	Supporting actress
2011	Lan Kwai Fong	Wilson Chin	Cat	Leading actress
2012	Vulgaria	Pang Ho-cheung	Popping Candy	Supporting actress
2012	Godfather	He Zi-Qiang		Short film
2013	Mommy	He Zi-Qiang		
2013	SDU: Sex Duties Unit	Gary Mak	Siu Keung's ex-wife	Guest
2013	Hardcore Comedy	Henri Wong Chi-Hang; Chong Siu-Wing; Law Yiu-Fai	Moon	Leading actress
2013	Tales from the Dark 1	Fruit Chan	Ghost	Leading actress
2014	Aberdeen	Pang Ho-cheung	Van	Guest
2014	Z Storm	David Lam	Angel Leung	Leading actress
2014	Flirting in the Air	Aman Chang	Shelly / Shelia	Leading actress
2015	An Inspector Calls	Raymond Wong Pak-Ming; Herman Yau Lai-To	Sexy	
2015	12 Golden Ducks	Matt Chow	Kitty	
2015	Lucky Star 2015	Ching Long	Pik Pik	
2015	Magic Card	Kwok-Man Keung	Meng Xiaoling	
2016	S Storm	David Lam	Ebby Lau	Guest
2017	Love off the Cuff			
2017	The Empty Hands			
2018	Lucid Dreams			
2019	P Storm	David Lam	Donut Ma	
2019	Missbehavior		Rosalin Lin	
2019	Remember What I Forgot			
2020	The Secret Diary of a Mom to Be			
2021	G Storm	David Lam	Donut Ma	

=== Television series ===
Year	Name	Role	Note
2024	The Heir to the Throne	Niki Chu Lai-kei	

== Awards and nominations ==
- 2010 – Face Magazine BSX Trendy Girls
- 2010 – Face Magazine Hot Face
- 2010 – HIM Magazine Hottest of The Year
- 2010 – China P+ New Face
- 2010 – Moko! Top 50 New Face
- 2010 – HIM Magazine Hottest of The Year
- 2012 – U.S. TC Candler Top 100 Beautiful Face - Rank 44th

Year	Nominated work	Award	Category	Results
2013	Vulgaria	32nd Hong Kong Film Awards	Best Supporting Actress	Won
2013	Vulgaria	49th Golden Horse Film Festival and Awards	Best Supporting Actress	Nominated

== Advertisements ==
Spokesperson

- 2010 : 36 online game – HK & Taiwan
- 2011 : Luvinia onlinegame – HK
- 2011 : ASANA WELLNESS Water2
- 2011 : Spa Collection – HK
- 2012 : Spa Collection – HK & Guangzhou
- 2013 : Spa Collection – HK & Guangzhou
- 2013 : Tao Ti Watermelon Juice

CM

- Hershey's
- FREE&FREE
- Sony T2
- Biotherm
- HK Yan Oi Hospital
- HK Jockey Club
- Vision Pro
- Tao Ti
- Standard Chartered Bank
- Carlsberg x Neway
- ASANA WELLNESS Water2
- Spa Collection
- Neway
- Pakme Fashion
- Takayama
- Egawa Sushi
- Federal Restaurant

== Publication ==
- 2010 i-phone apps Bijin-tokei
- Debut portrait album <First Impression>
- 2011 Calendar <Everyday With You>
- 2011 debut solo portrait album <Motion>
- 2012 debut diary <Dada Secret>

== Others ==
- Voice for E-book <Love Education Underground>
- Tokyo Girls Award A/W 2011
- Tokyo Girls Collection S/S 2012
- 2012 Debut Single <Believe in Love>
