= 12 Golden Ducks =

2015 Hong Kong film by Matt Chow

- Film poster
- Directed by: Matt Chow
- Written by: Matt Chow
- Produced by: Sandra Ng
- Starring: Sandra Ng; Wilfred Lau; Philip Keung; Babyjohn Choi
- Cinematography: Edmond Fung
- Edited by: Azrael Chung
- Music by: Alan Wong; Janet Yung
- Production companies: Treasure Island Production Limited; One Cool Films
- Distributed by: Edko Films
- Release date: 19 February 2015
- Running time: 84 minutes
- Country: Hong Kong
- Language: Cantonese
- Box office: HK$24.3 million

12 Golden Ducks (simplified Chinese: 12金鸭; traditional Chinese: 12金鴨) is a 2015 Hong Kong comedy film directed by Matt Chow and starring Sandra Ng. It was theatrically released on 19 February 2015.

Like the previous 3 prostitution-themed comedy films starring Ng, i.e. Golden Chicken (2002), Golden Chicken 2 (2003) and Golden Chicken 3 (2014), it was released on Chinese New Year.

The story follows Future Chang, a former gigolo who returns to Thailand after a painful affair. With the help of an old friend, he trains to regain his physique and return to Hong Kong to resume his career as a male escort.

== Cast ==
- Sandra Ng as Cheung Kan-loi
- Louis Koo as Rocky
- Nicholas Tse
- Simon Yam as King Sum
- Joey Yung
- Bosco Wong
- Chrissie Chau as Mei
- Anthony Wong as Mr. Lo
- Zhao Wei
- Michelle Chen as Suk-fan
- Fiona Sit
- Eason Chan as Master Kenji
- Ivana Wong
- Eddie Peng
- Luhan
- Wilfred Lau as Chan Sau-yan
- Babyjohn Choi as Lau-wan
- Carlos Chan
- Dada Chan
- Pakho Chau as Jamie
- Kelvin Kwan
- Philip Keung
- Carman Lee
- Joyce Cheng
- Isabella Leong
- Michelle Loo
- Wyman Wong
- Louis Yuen
- Michelle Wai
- Lo Hoi-pang
- Benz Hui
