= S Storm =

2016 Hong Kong film by David Lam

- Poster
- Traditional Chinese: S風暴
- Simplified Chinese: S风暴
- Hanyu Pinyin: S Fēng Bào
- Jyutping: S Fung1 Bou6
- Directed by: David Lam
- Screenplay by: Wong Ho-wah
- Story by: David Lam
- Produced by: Raymond Wong
- Starring: Louis Koo; Julian Cheung; Vic Chou; Ada Choi; Bowie Lam; Dada Chan; Janelle Sing
- Cinematography: Kenny Tse
- Edited by: Poon Hung-yiu
- Music by: Anthony Chue
- Production companies: Pegasus Motion Pictures; My Pictures Studio; Shanghai Jiaxi Cultural Communications
- Distributed by: Huace Pictures (Tianjin) (China)
- Release dates: September 14, 2016 (China); September 15, 2016 (Hong Kong)
- Running time: 95 minutes
- Country: Hong Kong
- Languages: Cantonese; Mandarin
- Box office: CN¥209 million

S Storm is a 2016 Hong Kong crime action thriller film directed by David Lam and starring Louis Koo, Julian Cheung and Vic Chou. The film was released in China by Huace Pictures on September 14, 2016 and in Hong Kong on September 15, 2016.

It is the second installment in a pentalogy, preceded by Z Storm (2014) and succeeded by L Storm (2018), P Storm (2019) and G Storm (2021).

== Plot ==
While he is tailing a Jockey Club football betting trader in his investigation, ICAC Principal Investigator William Luk of the ICAC witnesses the murder of the trader by a lone assassin Song Yan-sheun.

Inspector Lau Po-keung of the Serious Crime Unit is assigned to the murder case but gets nowhere with Luk's testimony as Luk refuses to disclose anything pertaining to his own investigation. Despite pressure from his boss to leave the ICAC to their investigation, Lau instead suggests to Luk that they work together to solve the case.

The Police investigation leads to someone called Teacher, the biggest player who controls the illegal bookmaking on football betting in Hong Kong. They intercept some instructions that Teacher sent to the assassin Song. Lau is in hot pursuit of Song, but he escapes by using Lau's sister, Ebby. Terry Lun, the Security Manager of the Jockey Club also encounters suspicious bank transactions, but is murdered by Song.

Big Boss, a British national and the mastermind behind an international crime syndicate who manipulates football matches in Europe, tries to destroy evidence linking him to the match fixing. He becomes suspicious and orders Teacher to be assassinated and also hires someone to assassinate Song. Big Boss forces Lau to give up evidence linking him to match fixing by kidnapping Ebby and force an exchange. Lau leaves hints to his subordinates and to Luk as to where the exchange will take place. Lau arrives on scene first but encounters several foreign henchmen employed by Big Boss. This leads to a shoot out where Lau kills a henchmen but is critically wounded saving Ebby from being executed. Luk and his team shortly arrive but are pinned down by an assault rifle wielding henchman. Song then arrives on scene to get revenge on Big Boss killing several henchmen but is killed the assault rifle wielding henchman who is then flanked and shot dead by Luk. Big Boss attempts to flee the chaos but is cornered and captured by Luk's team. After recovering the evidence, together, Luk is able to arrest Big Boss's partner Ha Chi Yin (Shek Sau), one of the directors of the Jockey Club who is the shoo-in candidate as the next Chairman.

== Cast ==
- Louis Koo as William Luk, ICAC Principal Investigatar
- Julian Cheung as Lau Po-keung, Inspector
- Vic Chou as Song Yan-sheun
- Ada Choi as Wong Man-ling
- Bowie Lam as Terry Lun
- Dada Chan as Ebby Lau
- Janelle Sing as Tammy Tam
- Lo Hoi-pang as Sun Wah-shan
- Derek Tsang as Joe Ma
- Jacky Cai as Lily Li
- Jenny Xu as Tall Girl
- Song Haijie as Liu Hang
- Sam Chan as Ballman
- Deon Cheung as Siu Leung
- Alan Luk as Choi
- Jones Lee as Fork

=== Special appearance ===
- Shek Sau as Ha Chi-yin

=== Guest appearance ===
- Philip Keung as Bill Tang
- Joe Cheung as Board member of China Company
- Joseph Tay as Daniel
- Kwok Fung as Superintendent of Police
- Terence Yin as Tang Siu-hung
- Jan Tse as Master of Ceremony

== Reception ==
The film grossed CN¥209 million at the Chinese box office.

== Sequel ==
The film is followed by a sequel, L Storm, released on 23 August 2018 in Hong Kong.
