= Girls Without Tomorrow =

1988 Hong Kong film by David Lam and Wong Chi

- DVD cover
- Directed by: David Lam Tak Luk; Wong Chi
- Written by: Raymond To Kwok Wai; Tommy Sham Sai Sang; Joan Lau Woon Gwan
- Produced by: Teddy Robin Kwan
- Starring: Elsie Chan; Maggie Cheung; Fung Bo-Bo; Stanley Fung
- Cinematography: Jingle Ma Choh Sing
- Edited by: Kam Ma
- Production companies: Alan and Eric Films Ltd.
- Release date: 1988
- Running time: 94 minutes
- Country: Hong Kong
- Language: Cantonese
- Box office: HK$10.17 million

Girls Without Tomorrow aka Call Girl '88 (Chinese: 應召女郎1988) is a 1988 Hong Kong film directed by David Lam Tak Luk and Wong Chi.

It was followed by a sequel in 1992: Girls Without Tomorrow 1992.

== Plot ==
Female actress Jenny (Maggie Cheung) is actually a high-class escort; Mei-Feng (Fung Bo-Bo) chooses to become a prostitute to pay her husband's medical bills; Shan-Shan (Carrie Ng) unwillingly becomes a prostitute to pay her mother's medical bills; Ling-Yu (Elsie Chan) is Shan-Shan's optimistic roommate.

== Cast and roles ==
- Elsie Chan as Ling-Yu
- Maggie Cheung as Jenny Lin
- Fung Bo-Bo as Mei-Feng / Tsui Tsui
- Stanley Fung as Fang
- Lau Siu-Ming as Ling-Yu's Godfather
- Alan Chui Chung-San as Brother Two
- Lin Chung as Uncle Yen
- Carrie Ng as Shan-Shan
- Kent Tong as Television Actor

== See also ==
- Prostitution in Hong Kong
