= Andy Hui =

Hong Kong singer and actor (born 1967)

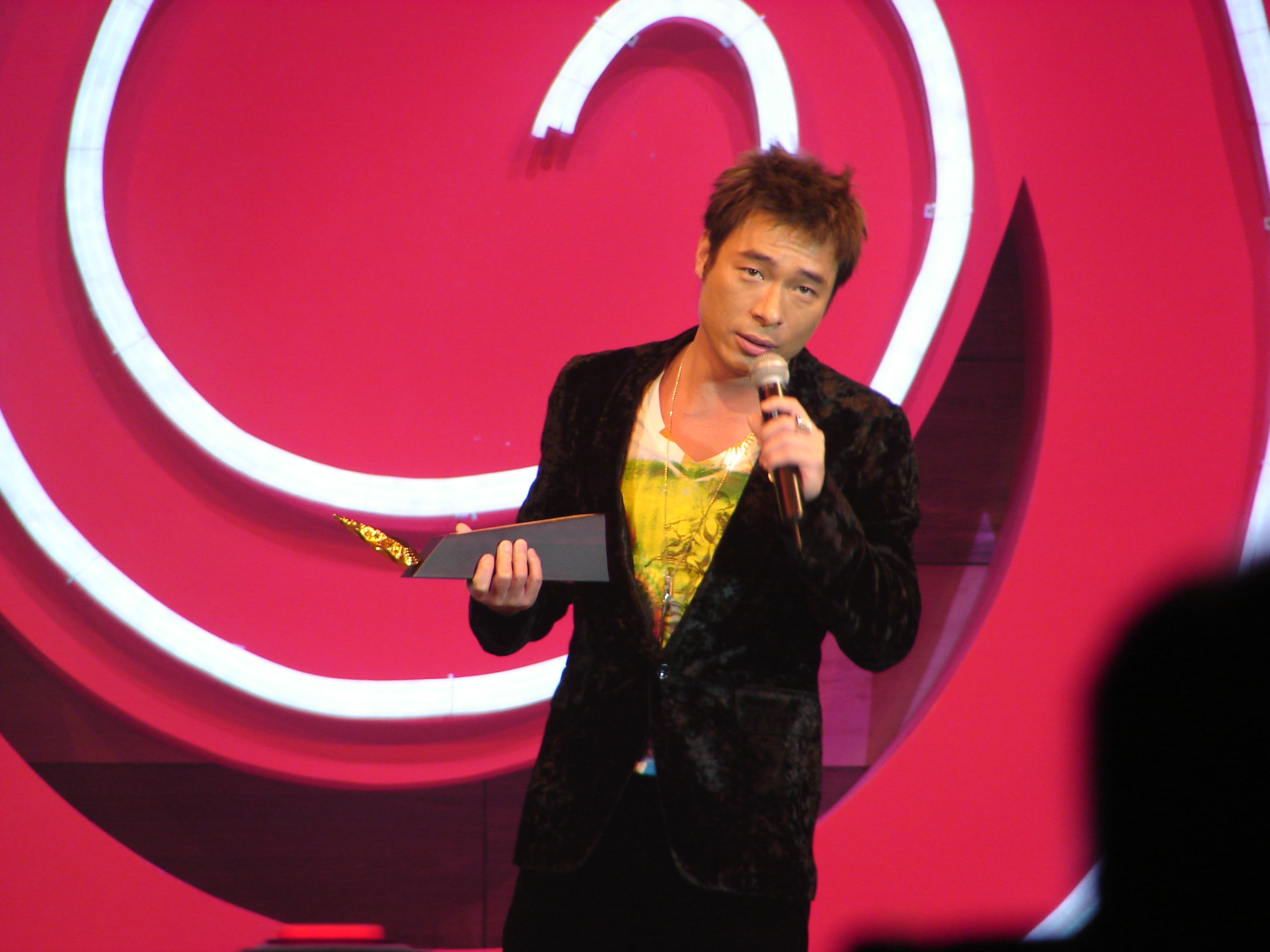
- Hui in 2007
- Born: Andrew Hui Chi On; 12 August 1967 (age 59); British Hong Kong
- Occupations: Singer; songwriter; actor
- Years active: 1986–2019; 2020-present
- Spouse: Sammi Cheng (unregistered since 2013)
- Awards: New Talent Singing Awards – 1986 First Runner-up

Chinese name
- Traditional Chinese: 許志安
- Simplified Chinese: 许志安
Transcriptions
Standard Mandarin
- Hanyu Pinyin: Xǔ Zhì'ān
Yue: Cantonese
- Jyutping: heoi2 zi3 on1
- Musical career
- Genres: Cantopop
- Instrument: Vocals
- Label: Amusic

Andrew Hui Chi On (born 12 August 1967) is a Hong Kong singer and actor. Hui is considered one of the most successful Hong Kong singers, with an extensive list of Cantonese and Mandarin hits to his credit.

== Early life ==
Hui's mother is Vietnamese. He was transferred to Confucian Tai Shing Primary School because his previous school forced him to perform tasks right-handed when he was born left-handed.

== Career ==
Hui was the first runner-up in the fifth Annual New Talent Singing Awards in 1986. Hui has appeared in more than 25 films.

His first music contract came in 1986, and his singing career reached stellar status in 2001 as he won awards of the most favourite male singer.

In 2004, Hui was named by Alan Tam as one of the 'New Four Heavenly Kings' along with Hacken Lee, Leo Ku, and Edmond Leung which would be replacing the once lustrous title awarded to Jacky Cheung, Andy Lau, Aaron Kwok, and Leon Lai.

In October 2005, Andy was declared one of Ten Outstanding Young Persons where his hard work on his music and film career, and his excellence in commitment to the community was recognized.

== Personal life ==
Hui married singer-actress Sammi Cheng in 2013. Sammi admitted in 2018 that they have never legally registered to marry.

On April 16, 2019, a video of Hui being intimate with former HK Pageant contestant and TVB actress Jacqueline Wong during a taxi ride was released. The incident was recorded by the taxi's in-vehicle camera. Hui made a public apology to his wife and loved ones, citing he was drunk that night but admitted his intoxication was no excuse for his behaviour. Wong's image and career was badly affected but Hui was able to save his marriage after the scandal.

== Discography ==
- 5 May 1988: Andy Hui
- 1988: Love Fragments / Shang De Che Di
- 1989: Andy Hui 1989
- March 1990: Andy Hui 1990
- March 1991: Break and Reform Collection
- January 1992: Alive!
- January 1993: Loving You
- July 1993: Sunshine After The Rain
- December 1993: Never Love Like This
- 1994: Xiang Shuo (想說)
- June 1994: Unique
- 6 December 1994: Heart
- 1994: Unless You Tell Me
- 1995: Paradise Lost
- 1996: Nan Ren Zui Tong (男人最痛)
- 1997: Man's Emotion
- 1997: Ai De Xing Ku Xin Jiu Dui Zhao 17 Shou (New Song + Collection) (愛的辛苦新舊對照十七首)
- 1997: Yi Qie An Hao Xin Jiu Dui Zhao 17 Shou (New Mandarin Song + Best Selection)
- 1997: My Day, My Song
- 1997: Kan Qing Chu (看清楚) – Mandarin CD
- 1998: Fei De Qi (飛得起)
- 1998: First, Second, Third, Fourth – Mandarin Album
- 1998: Good Andy Hui 98 Concert
- 1999: Faith With Heart
- 1999: Andy Hui 99 Live in Concert
- 1999: Faith in Love
- 1999: The End of 20th Century Collection
- 1999: We Want Happiness
- 1999: Sound And Vision 46 Collection
- January 2000: Believe in Love
- 2000: Shang Ci (上次)
- 2001: You Xian Yong Bao (優先擁抱) – Cantonese Album
- 2001: This One Second, Is it you, OK? – Mandarin Album
- 2001: Mud (Laan nai) – Cantonese Album
- 2002: Wo Hai Neng Ai Shei (我還能愛誰) – Mandarin Album
- 2002: Roma – Cantonese Album
- December 2002: On Hits (New + Best Selections)
- August 2003: My Story
- January 2004: Life in Music (New + Best Selections)
- February 2004: Couldn't Be Better
- 29 October 2004: Back Up
- February 2005: Encore Concert (安哥對唱音樂會)
- May 2005: First Round Concert (第一回合演唱會)
- November 2005: Cantonese New + Best Collection (大風吹 – 廣東新歌+精選三十首)
- 2005: Xiang Ai Duo Nian (相愛多年) – (New Mandarin Song + Best Selection)
- September 2006: In The Name of...
- 2007: Kong Qian Jue Hou (空前絕後)
- 2009: Zi Dao / Zi Chuan (自導／自傳) – (New Song + Selection)
- 2009: Ge Ren (歌人) – Mandarin CD
- May 2011: On and On
- 2014: New Heaven
- 2015: Come on Enjoy The Best (New Song + Selection)
- 2017: 18 Ounces

== Filmography ==
- Girls Without Tomorrow 1992 (1992)
- First Shot (1993)
- Future Cops (1993)
- Tequila (1993)
- Cop Image (1994)
- Wonder Seven (1994)
- Mack the Knife (1995)
- Happy Hour (1995)
- Who's the Woman, Who's the Man (1996) [cameo]
- Mystery Files (1996)
- Swallowtail Butterfly (1996)
- Feel 100%...Once More (1996)
- Love Amoeba Style (1997)
- Ah Fai the Dumb (1997)
- Love is not a game, but a joke (1997)
- A Love Story (1998)
- Marooned (2000)
- Nightmares in Precinct 7 (2001)
- Killing End (2001)
- Interactive Murders (2002)
- The Monkey King: Quest for the Sutra (2002)
- Give Them a Chance (2002)
- Sex and the Beauties (2004)
- Koma (2004)
- Six Strong Guys (2004)
- To Grow With Love (Lush Field Happy Event) (2006)
- Silence (2006)
- Dressage to Win (2008)
- ICAC Investigators 2009 (2009)
- Claustrophobia (2009)
- Split Second murders (2009)
- 72 Tenants of Prosperity (2010)
- Summer Love Love (2011)
- A Big Deal (2011)
- I Love Hong Kong 2012 (2012)
- Nessun Dorma (2016)
