= Candy Yuen =

Hong Kong actress and presenter

- 袁嘉敏
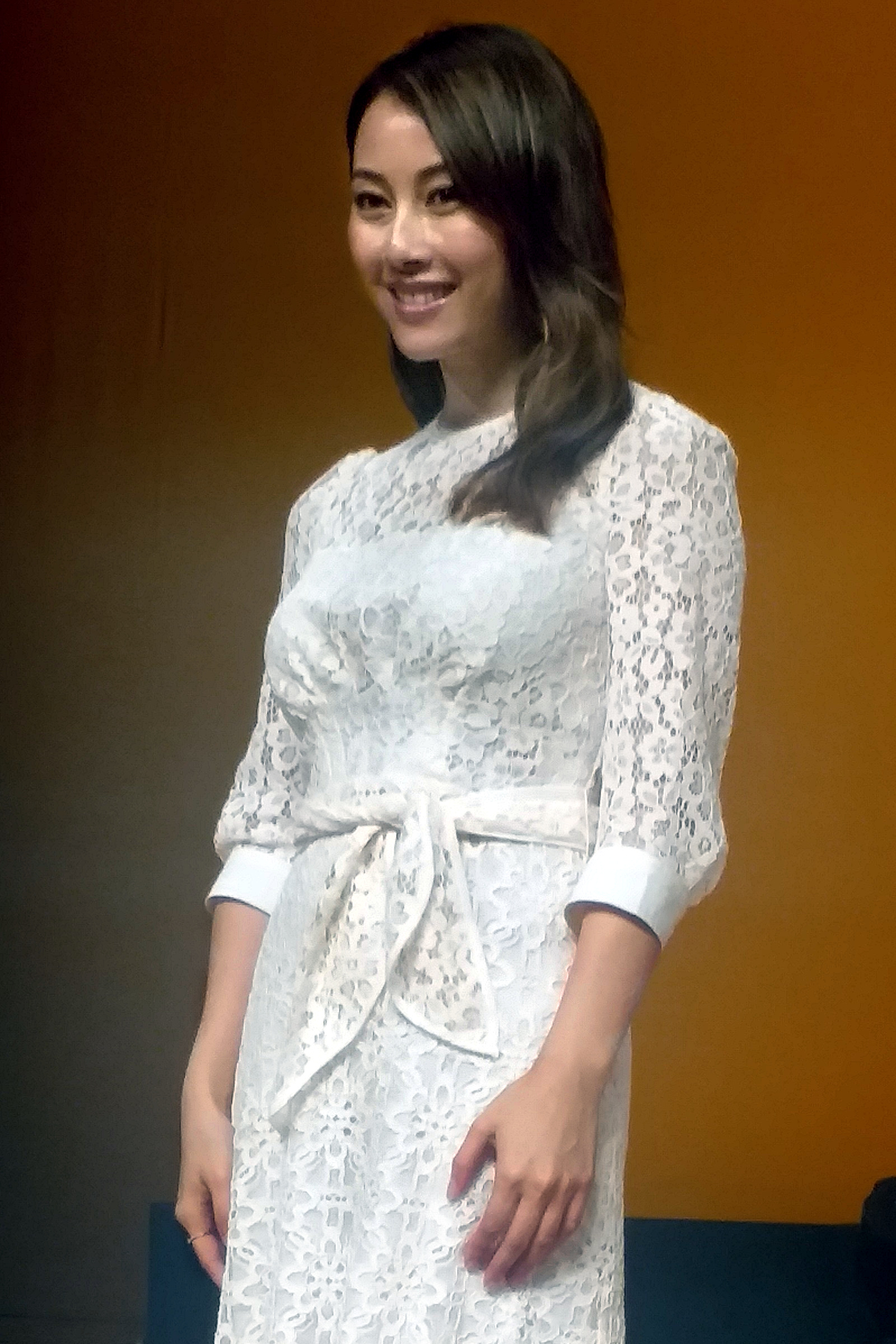
- Yuen in 2019
- Born: Yuen Ka-man; October 28, 1984 (age 41); British Hong Kong
- Education: University of Hong Kong
- Occupations: Actress; TV presenter
- Years active: 2009–present

Candy Yuen Ka-man (Chinese: 袁嘉敏; pinyin: Yuán Jiāmǐn; born October 28, 1984) is a Hong Kong actress and presenter. Yuen was a contestant in the Miss Hong Kong 2009 when she won the Miss Photogenic Award. She is best known for the female lead in The Gigolo (2015) as Michelle.

Yuen migrated to London in late 2023 but returned to Hong Kong in March 2025, finding the Asian lifestyle more suitable for her.

== Education ==
Yuen boarded at Mater Christi College in Melbourne, Australia from the age of 13. She studied at the University of Melbourne (Media and Communications), leaving to enroll at the University of Hong Kong where she graduated with a major in comparative literature.

== Filmography ==
=== Films ===
| Year | English title | Chinese title | Role | Notes |
|---|---|---|---|---|
| 2014 | From Vegas to Macau | 賭城風雲 | Mr. Ko's female enforcer | |
| 2014 | Naked Ambition 2 | 豪情3D | Cecilia Jik | |
| 2014 | Overheard 3 | 竊聽風雲3 | Prostitute | (uncredited) |
| 2014 | Zombie Fight Club | 屍城 | Female jailer leader | |
| 2015 | The Gigolo | 鴨王 | Michelle | |
| 2015 | SPL II: A Time for Consequences | 殺破狼2 | Fong Wing-kum | |
| 2016 | Buddy Cops | 刑警兄弟 | Reporter | Cameo |
| 2016 | Midnight Cafe: The Missing Girl | 深夜咖啡館之失蹤少女 | | |
| 2017 | In the Fog | 谜证 | | China film |
| 2019 | Prison Flowers | 女子監獄 | | |

=== Television ===
| Year | English title | Original title | Role | Notes |
|---|---|---|---|---|
| 2010 | Super Trio Game Master | 超級遊戲獎門人 | Herself | Episode 19 |
| 2011 | Lives of Omission | 潛行狙擊 | Ting Man | |
