= Iris Chung =

- Born: Chung Wing-wai; October 21, 1987 (age 38); British Hong Kong
- Occupations: Actress; model
- Years active: 2010–present
- Agent: JACSO (2010–present)

Iris Chung (born October 21, 1987), formerly known as Zhong Yonghui, is a model who was born in British Hong Kong. She was the only Hong Kong representative selected for the Tokyo Girls Award in May 2012. Chung has an acting career, starting as the first supporting actress in the movie Mr. & Mrs. Player. She was one of the leading actress of the movie Flirting in the Air.

== Filmography ==
Film
Year	Title	Director	Role	Notes
2013	Mr. & Mrs Play	Wong Jing		Supporting actress
2014	Flirting in the Air	Wong Jing	Winter	One of the leading actress
2016	The Gigolo 2	Venus Keung	Sushi	
2016	From Vegas to Macau III	Andrew Lau, Wong Jing	Iris	
2016	iGirl			
2019	She's a Man. He's a Woman			

Microfilm
Year	Title	Director	Role	Notes
2012	True Love of May Flower			Shanghai Commercial
2013	Girls Apartment 2013			One of the leading actress

Television
Year	Title	Director	Role	Notes
2017	Bet Hur			

== Publications ==
Photobook
Year	Title	Notes
2010	Inside	
2011	What's Up	with Monna Lam
2012	Iris Chung Sexy Icon 2012	

== Others ==
- Tokyo Girls Award S/S 2012
