= Pauline Chan Bo-Lin =

Hong Kong actress (1973–2002)

Pauline Chan
- Born: May 23, 1973; Shanghai, China
- Died: July 31, 2002 (aged 29); Shanghai, China
- Occupation: Actress
- Years active: 1990–2002
- Children: 1

Chinese name
- Traditional Chinese: 陳寶蓮
- Simplified Chinese: 陈宝莲
Transcriptions
Standard Mandarin
- Hanyu Pinyin: Chén Bǎolián

Pauline Chan Bo-Lin (simplified Chinese: 陈宝莲; traditional Chinese: 陳寶蓮; pinyin: Chén Bǎolián; May 23, 1973 – July 31, 2002) was a Hong Kong actress who aroused significant attraction and controversies in the Greater China Area during her active years in the 1990s.

== Career ==
Born in Shanghai, Chan's parents divorced when she was very young and she immigrated to Hong Kong with her mother at the age of 12. She started to work as a part-time fashion model at the age of 15 and contested in the 1990 Miss Asia Pageant. Chan did not win any title in this contest but her figure, 175-centimeter height and mature look drew the attention of local pornographic film industry. She entered this industry in 1991 at 18 years old, mainly to meet her mother's expectations to finance their family. Until 1997, Chan showed up in more than 25 Hong Kong Category III films and gained widespread attraction for her bold performance, becoming a prominent sex symbol in the Greater China Area at that time.

== Downfall ==
In 1997, Chan began a relationship with the playboy Taiwanese investment tycoon and celebrity Huang Jen-chung (黃任中, also known as Wong Yam-Chung (黄蔭衷) in Cantonese) whom she met in 1993, and who was 33 years older than she was. She moved to Taipei to cohabit with Huang until they broke up in early 1999. After her death, in a media interview Huang revealed that Chan had been involved in drug abuse and sorcery since 1998; Chan did so in anticipation to soothe herself and win his heart back during their emotional low tides.

Between 1998 and 2001, Chan was involved in a chain of negative news. She attempted suicide during a TV interview, repeatedly attacked people, undressed in public, tried to enter foreign countries without valid travel documents and was deported as a result, set fire to her residence, and was frequently hospitalized for drug abuse. In December 1999, she was briefly imprisoned in the United Kingdom for beating an unrelated person in public.

== Death ==
Chan hit rock bottom and secluded herself in Shanghai. Her final stage appearance was a bit role in a Taiwanese TV series in March 2002. She gave birth to a baby boy on June 23, 2002 out of wedlock. Around PM 17:30 on 31 July 2002, Chan jumped out of her 24th-floor apartment window to her death.

Chan was portrayed posthumously by Chinese actress Crystal Suen Ah-Lei, in the 2002 biopic Pauline's Life (絕代豔星寶蓮的一生). Suen later also committed suicide in 2009 in part due to her debts.

Chan's son was later adopted and raised by Taiwanese film producer Chiou Lee-Kwan. Chiu gave him the name Chiu Hwang-yi.

== Filmography ==
- Millennium Mambo (2001)
- Paramount Motel (2000)
- Hunting Evil Spirit (1999)
- Flowers of Shanghai (1998)
- 02:00 A.M. (1997)
- Passionate Nights (1997)
- Boys? (1996)
- Hong Kong Showgirls (1996)
- Once Upon a Time in Triad Society (1996)
- A Sudden Love (1995)
- Dream Lovers (1994)
- From Beijing with Love (1994)
- All Over the World (1993)
- Angel the Kickboxer (1993)
- Flying Dagger (1993)
- Love is Over (1993)
- A Man of Nasty Spirit (1993)
- Run for Life - Ladies From China (1993)
- Sex for Sale (1993)
- Slave of the Sword (1993)
- Whores from the North (1993)
- A Wild Party (1993)
- Behind the Pink Door (1992)
- Devil of Rape (1992)
- Erotic Ghost Story 3 (1992)
- Escape from Brothel (1992)
- The Girls from China (1992)
- Girls Without Tomorrow 1992 (1992)
- It's Now or Never (1992)
- Spider Force (1992)
- Queen of the Underworld (1991)
