= Naked Ambition 2 =

2014 Hong Kong film by Lee Kung-lok

- Traditional Chinese: 3D豪情
- Simplified Chinese: 3D豪情
- Hanyu Pinyin: Sān D Háo Qíng
- Jyutping: Saam1 D Hou4 Cing4
- Directed by: Lee Kung-lok
- Written by: Chan Hing-ka
- Produced by: Louis Koo; Chan Hing-ka
- Starring: Chapman To; Josie Ho
- Edited by: Curran Pang
- Music by: Day Tai; Afuc Chan
- Production companies: One Cool Production Company; 852 Films
- Release date: 3 April 2014
- Running time: 107 minutes
- Country: Hong Kong
- Languages: Cantonese; Japanese
- Box office: HK$16,036,143

Naked Ambition 2, also known as 3D Naked Ambition (Chinese: 3D豪情), is a 2014 Hong Kong 3D sex comedy film directed by Lee Kung-lok and starring Chapman To and Josie Ho. It is a loose sequel to Chan Hing-ka and Dante Lam's 2003 film Naked Ambition. Filming began in Tokyo in October 2013. The film parodies the Japanese adult film industry through various iconic scenes with exaggerated expressions.

== Plot ==
Literature graduate Wyman Chan (Chapman To) writes erotic stories in the soft porn section of the newspaper for a living, but with the soft porn section ceasing publication, he loses his job. The unemployed Chan becomes capricious, and takes inspiration from men working in the Japanese adult video (AV) industry to become a producer of pornographic films. Chan's idea immediately receives enthusiastic responses from his friends, who offer their help—especially Hatoyama (Josie Ho), who is familiar with the Japanese porn industry. While everyone initially takes great interest in being a part of filming, Chan is soon forced into acting in the lead role. Surprisingly, Chan becomes a sensation in Japan for his performance of being sexually harassed and dominated by women in the AV. Hatoyama immediately travels to Hong Kong to persuade Chan to pursue his unrealistic dream—a Hong Kong man entering the Japanese AV industry.

== Cast ==
- Chapman To as Wyman Chan (Mario Ozawa)
- Josie Ho as Shodaiko Hatoyama, Wyman's agent
- Maiko Yūki as Maiko Yūki, who cures Wyman's impotence
- Taka Kato as Taka Kato, Wyman's master
- Yui Tatsumi as Yui Tatsumi, first AV actress in Wyman's debut
- Nozomi Aso as Nozomi Aso, AV actress in "Come for a Body Checkup, Mario" segment
- Anri Okita as Anri Okita, L-cup AV actress in "Pervettes in Train" segment
- Kana Yume as Kana Yume, cute ghost in "The Horny Spirits" segment
- Tsukasa Aoi as Noriko Waiyama, AV newbie in Sailor Moon outfit
- Tyson Chak as Larry Leung, Wyman's friend
- Derek Tsang as Simon Yuen, Wyman's friend
- Candy Yuen as Cecilia Jik, Wyman's girlfriend
- Louis Koo as Naoki Nagasaki, competitor for King of AV
- Sandra Ng as Kam, Hong Kong prostitute from Golden Chicken films
- Charlene Choi as Maisora Aoi, AV actress from China
- Wong Jing as Frankie Mo, nicknamed Fat Face Dragon
- Helen To as Show Host
