= Anri Okita =

Japanese actress, singer-songwriter and former pornographic film actress

- 沖田杏梨
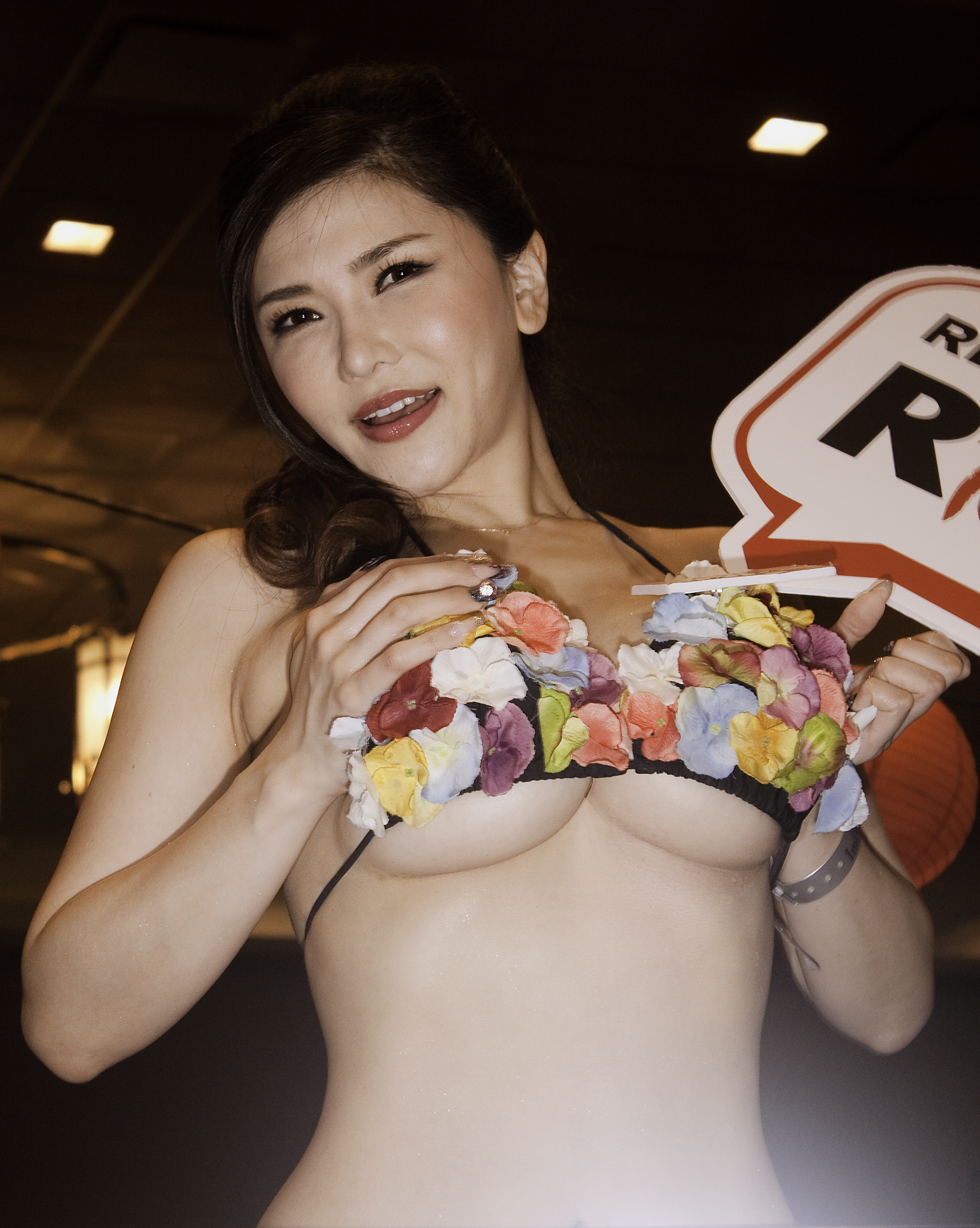
- Okita in 2016
- Born: Birmingham, England
- Citizenship: Japan
- Occupations: Actress; singer; songwriter
- Notable work: AV industry
- Spouse: Unknown (m. 2017)
- Children: 1
- Musical career
- Genres: J-pop, rock
- Instruments: Vocals, piano, saxophone
- Years active: 2011–present
- Formerly of: Ebisu Muscats

Anri Okita (Japanese: 沖田杏梨) is an English-born Japanese actress, singer, songwriter, and former pornographic film actress.

Between 2011 and 2016 Okita was active as a popular AV idol before retiring in May 2016 to focus on a career in mainstream media. From 2016 to 2017, Okita was a member of the idol group Ebisu Muscats. In 2017, Okita debuted as a solo music artist and released the album GORILLA. Okita has also acted in numerous mainstream Japanese language films, such as Naked Ambition 2 (2014), Assassination Classroom (2015), Scoop! (2016), and Diamond Dogs (2017).

== Early life ==
Okita was born in Birmingham, England, United Kingdom.

== Career ==
=== Pornographic film career (2011–2016) ===
In 2016, Okita announced her retirement from the adult industry and her last adult film Porn Retirement x Crimson – Anri Okita Captured by an Erotic Artist, directed by Kitorune Kawaguchi was released on 8 May 2016. Over her career Okita has been featured in nearly 300 films (including original works and numerous compilations).

=== Mainstream career (2017–present) ===
After retiring from adult films Okita remained highly popular in Japan, especially on social media and among the youth. In 2011, while still in the adult industry, Okita appeared in one episode of the popular Japanese tokusatsu television series Garo: Makai Senki. In 2016, Okita joined the popular pop rock group Ebisu Muscats, touring with the group in November and December 2016. In mid-2017, Okita left the group to pursue a solo career, releasing her first solo album Gorilla in October 2017. She also starred in several mainstream movies including the comedy Naked Ambition 2 and the action-thriller Diamond Dogs.

In late 2019, Okita started a YouTube channel where she uploads videos of her sketching and drawing. It is presented in a mix of English and Japanese. As of 15 February 2024, it had 53,700 subscribers and over 2,500,000 total channel views.

== Personal life ==
In December 2017, Okita married. The following year, she announced on her blog that she was pregnant following her 30th birthday.

== Filmography ==
Year	Work	Notes/Refs
2011–2012	Garo: Makai Senki	Appeared in seven episodes in season 1 and 2
2014	Naked Ambition 2	Credited as "Women number 2"
2015	Assassination Classroom	
2016	Assassination Classroom: Graduation	
2016	Scoop!	
2016	14 no yoru	
2017	Diamond Dogs	

== Discography ==
=== Albums ===
Anri Okita albums
Title	Album details	Peak positions			Sales
Title	Album details	JPN	TWN	HK	Sales
Anri Walk	Released: 26 August 2015; Seven songs; Run-time: 31 min	—	—	—	—
Gorilla	Released: 4 October 2017; Eight songs; Run-time: 35 min	49	38	9	JPN: 20,100

=== Singles and EPs ===
Anri Okita singles and EPs
Title	Year	Peak positions				Sales
Title	Year	JPN Oricon	JPN Hot 100	TWN East Asia	HK	Sales
Liar (EP)	2013	—	—	89	—	—
Wanna Stay with You	2015	—	—	—	—	—
Maboroshi Monster	2015	—	—	—	—	—
Cat Walk	2016	47	77	70	31	JPN: 195,000; TWN: 34,300; HK: 29,720

== See also ==
- List of Japanese singers
- List of former Ebisu Muscats members
- List of pornographic performers by decade
- List of people from Birmingham
