= Just a Gigolo =

Just a Gigolo may refer to:

- "Just a Gigolo" (song), a 1929 popular song adapted by Irving Caesar from the Austrian song "Schöner Gigolo, armer Gigolo"
- Just a Gigolo (1931 film), a romantic comedy directed by Jack Conway
- Just a Gigolo (1978 film) (Schöner Gigolo, armer Gigolo), a film starring David Bowie
- Just a Gigolo (soundtrack), soundtrack of the 1978 film.
- Just a Gigolo (TV series), a 1993 British sitcom starring Tony Slattery
