= Flirting in the Air =

2014 Hong Kong film by Aman Chang

- Film poster
- Traditional Chinese: 唐伯虎衝上雲霄
- Simplified Chinese: 唐伯虎冲上云霄
- Hanyu Pinyin: Táng Bó Hǔ Chōng Shàng Yún Xiāo
- Jyutping: Tong4 Baak3 Fu5 Cung1 Seong2 Wan4 Siu1
- Directed by: Aman Chang
- Screenplay by: Wong Jing
- Produced by: Wong Jing
- Starring: Chapman To; Dada Chan; Lam Chi-chung; Dominic Ho; Connie Man; Bella Lo; Hazel Tong; Iris Chung
- Cinematography: Dick Tung
- Edited by: Azrael Chung
- Music by: Lincoln Lo
- Production companies: Iner Limited; Mega Vision Pictures
- Distributed by: Mega Vision Pictures; Newport Entertainment
- Release date: 1 October 2014
- Running time: 94 minutes
- Country: Hong Kong
- Language: Cantonese
- Box office: US$1,749,699

Flirting in the Air (唐伯虎衝上雲霄) is a 2014 Hong Kong sex comedy film directed by Aman Chang. The film was released on October 1, 2014.

== Cast ==
- Chapman To as Captain Cool, pilot for ICE Airlines
- Dada Chan as Shelly / Shelia
- Lam Chi-chung as Sam Tong, pilot for ICE Airlines
- Dominic Ho as Guy, pilot for ICE Airlines
- Connie Man as Autumn
- Bella Lo as Spring
- Hazel Tong as Summer
- Iris Chung as Winter
- Jim Chim as Dui Tong-gai, scholar working under Duke of Ning
- Law Lan as Sister Future, a time traveler from 2014
- Jerry Koo as Boss, owner of ICE Airlines
- Monna Lam as Monica, Boss's wife who had sex with Captain Cool in the bathroom
- Ben Cheung as Tong Pak-fu, member of the Four Scholars
- Charlie Cho as Master Hua
- Lam Siu-ha as Madam Hua, wife of Master Hua
- Tony Ho as Duke of Ning
- Law Chi-man as Chok Tse-shan, member of the Four Scholars
- Duncan Cheung as Hua Man, son of Master Hua
- Shi Zhenlong as Hua Mou, son of Master Hua
- Chu Cho-keung as Ruthless Scholar, martial artist working under Duke of Ning
- Ray Pang as Hua Sau, recruiter for servants
- Huang Lu as Fan Heung, newly recruited maid
- Jolie Fan as Min Heung, newly recruited maid
- Meimei Tsang as Airline stewardess
- Diva Hui as Airline stewardess
- Lika Siu as Airline stewardess

Summary:

Airline pilots Cool (Champan To), Sam (Lam Tze Chung) and Guy (Dominic Ho) were proud womanizers who took tremendous pleasure in making rounds with every stewardess they came across. But one day during a seemingly routine flight, they encountered a violent magnetic storm that sent them falling through a wormhole. Upon landing, they assumed the storm had blown them off course onto a film set, but in reality, they had traveled back in time to Ming Dynasty.
