= Babyjohn Choi =

Hong Kong actor (born 1986)

- 蔡瀚億
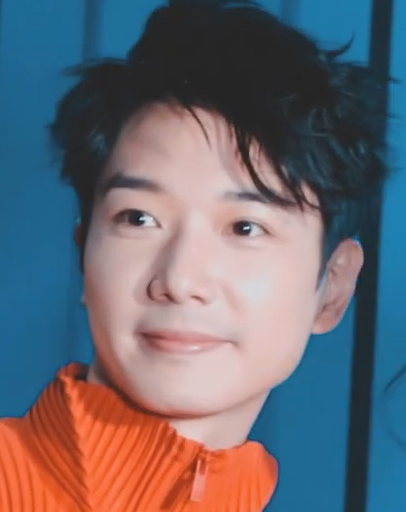
- Choi in February 2023
- Born: Choi Ming-yin; 8 December 1986 (age 39) (Note: According to Ming Pao, Choi had his birthday on 8 December 2020 and reached age 34.); Hong Kong
- Education: Hong Kong Academy for Performing Arts (BFA)
- Occupation: Actor
- Years active: 2013–present
- Spouse: Donut Cheung (m. 2013)

Babyjohn Choi Hon-yick (Chinese: 蔡瀚億; born Choi Ming-yin; 8 December 1986) is a Hong Kong actor. Debuting as Leung in the sports drama film The Way We Dance (2013), the role earned Choi Best New Performer in the 33rd Hong Kong Film Awards, and he later reprised it in the sequel The Way We Keep Dancing (2021). Choi went on to star in various productions after his first film role, including the horror film Twilight Online (2014), martial arts film Ip Man 3, crime film Imprisoned (both 2015), and comedy film The Yuppie Fantasia 3 (2017). He landed his first sole leading role as Tim Cheung in the horror film Vampire Cleanup Department (2017), followed by a breakout performance as a sacrificing policeman in the action film Shock Wave (2017). He also starred as Cel in the Storm Film Series, beginning with L Storm (2018) and concluded with the series finale G Storm (2021), and Lo Man Nai in the ViuTV drama series No One Lies (2023).

== Early life and education ==
Babyjohn Choi was born Choi Ming-yin on 8 December 1986. He grew up in Mei Foo and was raised by his grandparents. He began learning piano when he was three and later passed ABRSM Grade 8 when he was in Form 4. His parents changed his name to Choi Hon-yick while he was studying in primary school due to feng shui. He later attended Wah Yan College, Kowloon, and spent most of his time in secondary school joining bands and playing music. When he was in Form 2, he participated in a school drama performance of West Side Story, portraying the character Baby John. The experience sparked his interest in performing, and he changed his English name to Babyjohn after his first acting role to remind himself of his passion. He took business subjects for the Hong Kong Certificate of Education Examination, but did not perform well, scoring only a pass in five subjects. Determined to pursue a career in acting, he intended to apply for the Hong Kong Academy of Performing Arts, but missed the deadline after receiving his HKCEE results. He then took a gap year to learn jazz music, guitar, and drums, and reapplied to HKAPA the following year. While in university, Choi formed a band and took part in the school's musical performances. He graduated with a Bachelor of Fine Arts in performing arts in 2009. In the same year, Choi auditioned and won the role as Leung in the film The Way We Dance, but production did not begin until 2013. During the interval, he worked several jobs to make a living, including teaching music, performing in a theatre company, and filming advertisements. He left the theatre company after filming commenced.

== Career ==
Choi auditioned and won his debut role as Leung (Note: Choi's character in The Way We Dance and The Way We Keep Dancing was credited as Alan in overseas versions.) in the 2013 drama film The Way We Dance, where he portrayed the chairman of a university Tai Chi club who collaborated with a street dancer, portrayed by Cherry Ngan, to invent original dance choreographies incorporating Tai Chi moves. His performance was well received, for which he won Best New Performer in the 33rd Hong Kong Film Awards and was nominated for Best Newcomer in the 8th Asian Film Awards with the role. Choi began receiving film role offers after his breakout performance, starring in the lead role in the horror film Twilight Online, and voicing private investigator Bobby Mak in the animated comedy film McDull: Me & My Mum the following year. In 2015, Choi took on lead roles in the comedy film 12 Golden Ducks and crime film Imprisoned: Survival Guide for Rich and Prodigal, as well as minor roles in action films SPL II: A Time for Consequences and Ip Man 3. Choi was also cast in lead roles in the 2016 crime films House of Wolves and Fooling Around Jiang Hu.

In 2017, Choi was cast as the sole male lead in Chiu Sin-hang's horror romance film Vampire Cleanup Department, portraying Tim Cheung, a vampire hunter who posed as a street janitor and developed romantic entanglements with a female vampire played by Lin Min Chen. He also starred in lead roles in the comedy film The Yuppie Fantasia 3 and the drama film 29+1. Choi gained further recognition in the 2017 action film Shock Wave as an off-duty cop who sacrificed himself in a bomb attack by terrorists. The film's director Herman Yau handpicked Choi for the role after watching The Way We Dance and was impressed by his acting. Although the role was minor, Choi's performance received universal praise and was described as "tear-jerking". He also took on lead roles as Fung the gangster in the black comedy film The Sinking City Capsule Odyssey, starring alongside Pakho Chau and Louis Cheung, and as a wealthy playboy Si Tak Wah in the TVB drama series Oh My Grad, at the invitation of his APA classmate Wong Cho-lam.

The following year, Choi landed a recurring role as Cel, an ICAC officer, in the Storm Film Series, starting with the 2018 film L Storm and reprised his role in the 2019 sequel P Storm. Choi also took on a lead role in the mystery thriller film Guilt by Design, which featured an ensemble cast including Nick Cheung, Kent Cheng, Elaine Jin, Cecilia So, Jo Kuk, and Jiro Lee. He then starred in a main role in another TVB drama series, I Bet Your Pardon, produced by Wong Jing. In 2019, Choi ended his contract with his artist agency HMV Digital China and founded his own talent company, Made in Kami. He also became one of the regular hosts of the food-themed talk show Foodie Talkies on ViuTV since December 2019. He reprised a separate role in Shock Wave 2, a standalone sequel to the 2017 film, in 2020.

In 2021, Choi made a cameo appearance as a janitor, which resembles his character in Vampire Cleanup Department, in another Chiu Sin-hang's film One Second Champion. He also reprised his role as Leung in The Way We Dance's sequel The Way We Keep Dancing, and as Cel in G Storm, the final installment of the Storm Film Series. He did not receive any acting roles for a year during the COVID-19 pandemic and instead focused his time on writing screenplays. In 2023, Choi made his debut on ViuTV as the sole male lead in the drama series No One Lies, portraying Lo Man Nai, a morally dubious businessman who was drugged with truth serum. He also starred in supporting lead roles in the psychological thriller film Shadows and the action thriller film Death Notice.

== Personal life ==
Choi is a Christian. He is also an enthusiast of the Japanese tea ceremony and has been practicing it for nine years.

Choi married stage actress Donut Cheung in 2013, his classmate at Hong Kong Academy of Performing Arts, after being in a relationship for seven years.

== Filmography ==
=== Film ===
Year	Title	Role	Notes/Ref.
2013	The Way We Dance	Leung (柒良)	
2014	Delete My Love	Wan Duk-fuk (溫特福)	
2014	Twilight Online	Chan Ka-lok (陳家樂)	
2014	McDull: Me & My Mum	Bobby Mak	Voice role
2015	12 Golden Ducks	Lau Wan (流雲)	
2015	This is 50 / Wonder Mama	Ng's son	
2015	SPL II: A Time for Consequences	Kwok Chun-yat (郭俊一)	
2015	Imprisoned: Survival Guide for Rich and Prodigal	Ng Jai (伍仔)	
2015	Ip Man 3	Newspaper reporter	
2016	House of Wolves	Chi Wai (志偉)	
2016	Heartfall Arises	Jai Jai (仔仔)	
2016	Fooling Around Jiang Hu	Tung (小東)	
2017	The Yuppie Fantasia 3	Wong Ho (王皓)	
2017	Vampire Cleanup Department	Tim Cheung (張春天)	
2017	29+1	Cheung Hon-ming (張漢明)	
2017	Shock Wave	Wong Tin-nok (黃天諾)	
2017	Our Time Will Come	Guerilla member	
2017	The Sinking City Capsule Odyssey	Fung (鋒)	
2018	L Storm	Cel	
2018	Monster Hunt 2	Ben Ben (笨笨)	Voice role
2019	P Storm	Cel	
2019	Guilt by Design	Chan Wing Hei (陳永晞)	
2020	Shock Wave 2	Cheung Chi-man (張志文)	
2021	One Second Champion	Janitor	Cameo
2021	The Way We Keep Dancing	Leung	
2021	G Storm	Cel	
2023	Shadows	Mr. Cheung (張老師)	
2023	Death Notice	Wan Kim (尹劍)	

=== Television ===
Year	Title	Role	Notes/Ref.
2014	A Dream Comes True 2014	Leung Wing Kai (梁永佳)	Main role
2017	Oh My Grad	Si Tak Wah (史德華)	Main role
2019	I Bet Your Pardon	Su Kei (舒奇)	Main role
2020	Sexy Central	Henry	Main role
2023	No One Lies	Lo Man Nai (盧文乃)	Main role

== Awards and nominations ==
Year	Award	Category	Work	Result	Ref.
2014	2013 Hong Kong Film Directors' Guild Awards	Best Newcomer	The Way We Dance	Won	
2014	33rd Hong Kong Film Awards	Best New Performer	The Way We Dance	Won	
2014	8th Asian Film Awards	Best Newcomer	The Way We Dance	Nominated	
2014	14th Chinese Film Media Awards	Best New Performer	The Way We Dance	Nominated	
