= Twilight Online =

2014 Hong Kong film by Maggie To

- Film poster
- Directed by: Maggie To
- Written by: Maggie To
- Produced by: Tenky Tin Kai-Man; Weldon Fung Wai-Yuen
- Cinematography: Cheng Siu-Keung
- Edited by: Shirley Yip
- Music by: Raymond Wong; Florian Linckus
- Production companies: DC Pictures; Film Development Fund of Hong Kon
- Distributed by: Panasia Films
- Release date: 4 September 2014 (Hong Kong)
- Running time: 95 minutes
- Country: Hong Kong
- Box office: HK$3.84 million (Hong Kong)

Twilight Online (Chinese: 恐怖在線) is a 2014 Hong Kong horror film directed by Maggie To.

== Box office ==
The film has grossed HK$3.84 million at the Hong Kong box office.
