= The Gigolo 2 =

2016 Hong Kong film by Venus Keung

- Film poster
- Directed by: Venus Keung
- Written by: Clement Cheng; Lung Man-Hong; Derek Kwok
- Produced by: Wong Jing
- Starring: Dominic Ho; Connie Man; Jazz Lam; Iris Chung
- Cinematography: Venus Keung; Ng King-man
- Edited by: Li Ka-wing
- Music by: Lincoln Lo
- Production companies: Cameron Entertainment; Mega-Vision Project Production; GME Casting Studio
- Distributed by: Mei Ah Entertainment
- Release date: 14 January 2016
- Running time: 96 minutes
- Country: Hong Kong
- Language: Cantonese
- Box office: HK$2.52 million

The Gigolo 2 (Chinese: 鴨王2) is a 2016 Hong Kong erotic comedy film directed by Venus Keung and starring Dominic Ho, Connie Man, Jazz Lam and Iris Chung. It is the sequel to The Gigolo (2015). The film was released on 14 January 2016 in Hong Kong.

== Plot ==
Before Fung Ho claimed to be top of his career, he is now a semi-retired gigolo and runs a nightclub named High X. Monica and Sushi are two best friends who are extras in film and television for survivals. At Sushi's birthday party, Monica gets to know Fung when she can't find a taxi to get home and Fung offers to drive her back. After filming, Yi Tung, a madam comes to the set and asks Sushi if she wants to go for a boat party where there are rich guys. Sushi asks Monica along too despite her reluctance. Halfway throughout the boat party, Monica receives a text from her elder brother that her mother has been sent to the hospital. She panics as she is unable to go onshore. She meets Fung who is at the party too and he decides to take her back onshore on his speedboat. After fetching her mother home, Monica holds a family meeting with her siblings to decide who takes care of her mother but her siblings refuse to take the responsibility and she falls out with them. Her mother also has to undergo surgery. In order to get enough money for the high-cost surgery, Monica decides to join Sushi to be a prostitute. However, she is shy and nervous about sex, especially about anal sex and blowjobs. Sushi recommends her to Fung to learn the sex craft and after some coaching by Fung, she manages to overcome her problem and becomes an expert at pleasuring men. She also fell in love with Fung while being coached by Fung.

After she graduated from Fung, she sees Fung together with another girl Isabel, a lawyer who is going to be married and feels unhappy as a result. Sushi and her boyfriend Dick want to buy an apartment and are short of cash. Yi Tung recommends them to Big Dog but Dick feels apprehensive as he heard of gigolos being injured terribly while being hired by Big Dog and his wife Mona for sexual services. However, Sushi insists on accepting the offer. During the process, Sushi and Dick are killed by Big dog and Mona due to rough treatment. Monica and Fung saw the news of Sushi being murdered and decide to take revenge on Big Dog and Mona.

After that, Monica and Fung get married, but during the wedding, Fung is murdered by a few thugs hired by Isabel's husband as he found out that Isabel is having Fung's baby when he himself is sterilized.

== Cast ==
- Dominic Ho as Fung Ho, a retired gigolo who runs his own nightclub
- Connie Man as Monica, a film and TV extra
- Jazz Lam as Dick, a male gigolo
- Iris Chung as Sushi, friend of Monica
- Leslie Lam as Isabel, a lawyer
- Teresa Mak as Yi Tung, a madam
- Winnie Leung as Mona, wife of Big Dog
- Hazel Tong as Yoyo, an actress with a bad temper
- Tony Ho as Big Dog, husband of Mona
- Samuel Leung as Master Long
- Gill Mohindepaul Singh as Uncle Chiu
- Ronan Pak as Steven
- Wang Wanyou as Sara
