= The Gigolo (2015 film) =

2015 Hong Kong film by Au Cheuk-man

- Film poster
- Directed by: Au Cheuk-man
- Written by: Au Cheuk-man
- Produced by: Aman Chang
- Starring: Dominic Ho; Ong Yong Kuan; Lim Jun Hong; Jeana Ho; Hazel Tong; Winnie Leung; Candy Yuen
- Cinematography: Ng King-man
- Edited by: Li Ka-wing
- Music by: Day Tai
- Production companies: Cameron Entertainment; See Movie
- Distributed by: Mei Ah Entertainment
- Release date: 29 January 2015
- Running time: 97 minutes
- Country: Hong Kong
- Language: Cantonese
- Box office: HK$5.58 million

The Gigolo (Chinese: 鴨王) is a 2015 Hong Kong erotic drama film directed and written by Au Cheuk-man and starring Dominic Ho, Candy Yuen, Jeana Ho, Hazel Tong and Winnie Leung. A sequel titled The Gigolo 2 was released on 14 January 2016 with Dominic Ho reprising his role as Fung.

== Plot ==
The film opens with Fung exercising on the vertical bar at the balcony of his house. Then it follows on through to how he started his life as a gigolo to him becoming an actor and a lover of his director, a rich man's daughter.

== Cast ==
- Dominic Ho as Fung, a gigolo turned actor
- Candy Yuen as Michelle, a client of Fung
- Jeana Ho as Chloe, film director and Fung's girlfriend
- Hazel Tong as Yoyo, frequent client of Chris
- Winnie Leung as Belle, hair stylist for Abson
- Pal Sinn as Abson, nicknamed King of Gigolos
- Angelina Lo as Jane, Fung's mother
- Wong Chun-tong as Shing, nicknamed Big Dick Shing and Fung's father
- Jolie Fan as Jolie, Fung's first love
- Elena Kong as Hung, owner of a nightclub and Fung's cousin
- Tony Ho as Ben, Michelle's husband and Chloe's father
- Ronan Pak as Chris, a gigolo
- La Ying as Peter, Chloe's friend and also, Fung's rich high school classmate.

== Box office ==
The film opened to HK$2.33 million (US$300,620) over four days. It has grossed a total of HK$5.58 million (US$720,000).
