= House of Wolves (film) =

2016 Hong Kong film by Vincent Kok

- Film poster
- Traditional Chinese: 惡人谷
- Simplified Chinese: 恶人谷
- Hanyu Pinyin: È Rén Gǔ
- Jyutping: Ngok3 Jan4 Geok1
- Directed by: Vincent Kok
- Screenplay by: Vincent Kok; Anselm Chan; Steven Fung
- Produced by: Alvin Lam; Ren Yue
- Starring: Francis Ng; Ronald Cheng; Jiang Shuying
- Cinematography: Ko Cheung-lam
- Edited by: Kwong Chi-leung
- Music by: Dennie Wong; Victor Tse
- Production companies: Universe Entertainment; Sil-Metropole Organisation; Beijing Monster Pictures; Sun Entertainment Culture; Guangzhou Changchang Entertainment; Zhejiang Guangjian Pictures; Alpha Pictures (Hong Kong); Guangzhou City Ying Ming Culture Communication
- Distributed by: Universe Films Distribution
- Release date: 21 January 2016
- Country: Hong Kong
- Language: Cantonese
- Budget: US$3-5 million
- Box office: US$4,286,555

House of Wolves (Chinese: 惡人谷) is a 2016 Hong Kong comedy film co-written and directed by Vincent Kok, who also appears in a supporting role in the film, and starring Francis Ng and Ronald Cheng. The film was released on 21 January 2016.

== Plot ==
Charlie (Francis Ng) is a swindler who pretends to be a patient with amyotrophic lateral sclerosis, while Fung Yan-ping (Ronald Cheng) is an idle village leader. These two self-proclaimed wicked men fall in love at first sight with Yu Chun (Jiang Shuying), a newcomer to the village. Chun arrives to the village after falling out with her ex-boyfriend and is pregnant with their child. While helpless, Chun devises a scheme where she invites Charlie and Yan-ping to her house for dinner, causing them to be drunk and mistakenly believing that one of them have impregnated her. Unable to find out who the real father of the child, Charlie and Yan-ping both take care of Chun. One day, Charlie and Yan-ping realize that neither one of them are the father of Chun's father, and furiously return her to her ex-boyfriend in exchange for cash. Afterwards, by chance, Charlie and Yan-ping discovers that Chun's ex-boyfriend plan to use their child for an experiment and decides to rescue Chun and her unborn child.

== Cast ==
- Francis Ng as Charlie
- Ronald Cheng as Fung Yan-ping
- Jiang Shuying as Yu Chun
- Candice Yu
- Babyjohn Choi
- Ella Koon
- Derek Tsang
- Vincent Kok

=== Guest appearance ===
- Lam Chi-chung
- Ha Chun-chau
- Steven Fung
- Tam Ping-man
- Cheung Tat-ming
- Sam Lee
- Josie Ho
- Bonnie Wong
- Yu Mo-lin
- Lo Fan
- Eman Lam
- Wylie Chiu
- Ken Lo
- Tin Kai-man
- Terence Tsui
- Kwok Wai-kwok
- Cheng Man-fai
- Lydia Lau
- Louis Yuen
- Chrissie Chau

== Music ==
=== Theme song ===
- Sunny Day, Cloudy Day, Rainy Day (晴天陰天雨天)
  - Composer/Singer: Ronald Cheng
  - Lyricist: Tang Wai-sing
  - Arranger: Dennie Wong

=== Insert theme ===
- La chanson dé liseuse
  - Composer/Arranger: Dennie Wong
  - Lyricist/Singer: Vicky Fung
