= Aman Chang =

Hong Kong film director

- Occupation: Film director

Aman Chang (張敏) is a Hong Kong film director.

== Filmography ==
- Raped by an Angel 2: The Uniform Fan (1998)
- Raped by an Angel 3: Sexual Fantasy of the Chief Executive (1998)
- Sex and Zen III (1998)
- Fist Power (2000)
- The Trouble-Makers (2003)
- The Legend of Chu Liuxiang (2012, TV series)
- Let Go for Love (2014)
- Flirting in the Air (2014)
- The Gigolo (2015) (as producer only)
- Flirting Scholar From the Future (2019)
- Enter the Fat Dragon (2020 film)
