= David Lam (film director) =

Hong Kong film director

- Occupations: Film director, film producer, actor

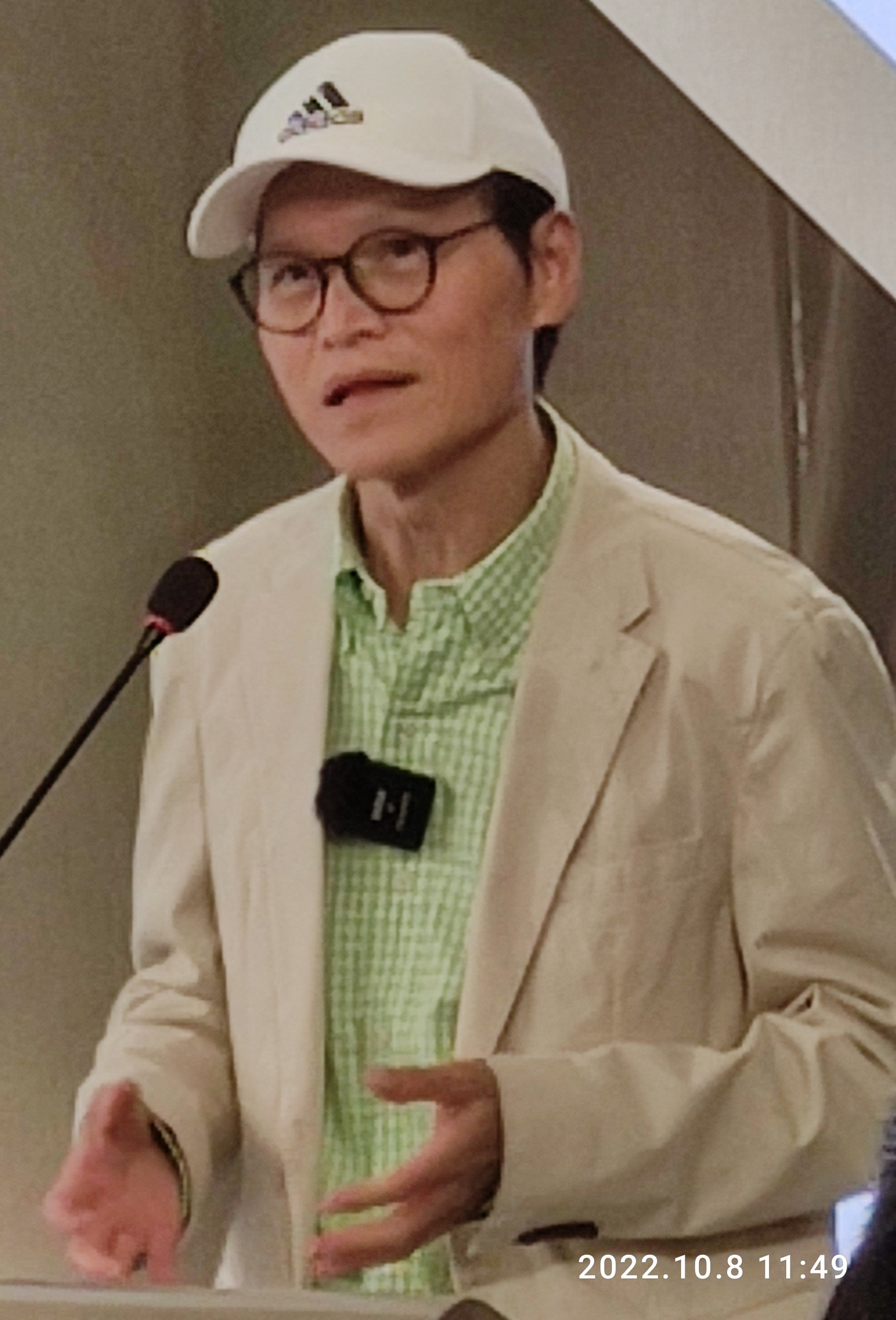
David Lam

David Lam Tak-luk (Chinese: 林德禄) is a Hong Kong film director, producer and actor.

== Filmography ==
Year	Title	Ref
1985	Goodbye Mama	
1988	Women Prison	
1988	Girls Without Tomorrow	
1989	The Wild Ones	
1990	Doctor's Heart	
1990	Hong Kong Gigolo	
1991	Powerful Four	
1992	Girls Without Tomorrow 1992	
1993	First Shot	
1993	Perfect Couples	
1994	Tears and Triumph	
1994	The Modern Love	
1995	Asian Connection	
1998	Magnificent Team	
1999	Water Margin: Heroes' Sex Stories	
1999	Street Angels	
2014	Z Storm	
2016	S Storm	
2018	L Storm	
2019	P Storm	
2021	G Storm	
