= Lo Hoi-pang =

Hong Kong actor and singer

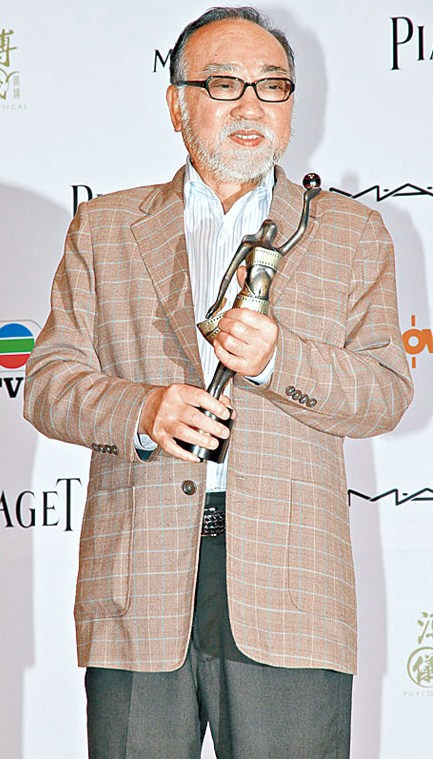
- Lo in 2012
- Born: 21 December 1941 (age 84); Panyu, Guangdong, China
- Occupation: Actor
- Years active: 1974–present
- Awards: Hong Kong Film Awards – Best Supporting Actor; 2012 Life Without Principle

Chinese name
- Traditional Chinese: 盧海鵬
- Simplified Chinese: 卢海鹏
Transcriptions
Standard Mandarin
- Hanyu Pinyin: Lú Hǎipéng

Lo Hoi-pang (born 21 December 1941) is a Hong Kong actor and singer. Lo attended TVB's Training Classes in 1973. Among his classmates are Chow Yun-fat and Ng Man-tat. Lo won the 2012 31st Hong Kong Film Awards for the Best Supporting Actor category for his performance in Life Without Principle.

== Filmography ==
- The Legend of the Book and the Sword (1976)
- The Iron-Fisted Monk (1977)
- Ups and Downs in the Sea of Love (2003)
- Life Without Principle (2012)
- Drug War (2012)
- Blind Detective (2013)
- Tales from the Dark 1 (2013)
- Rigor Mortis (2013)
- The White Storm (2013)
- Firestorm (2013)
- Golden Chicken 3 (2014)
- Iceman (2014)
- Don't Go Breaking My Heart 2 (2014)
- Delete My Love (2014)
- Z Storm (2014)
- 12 Golden Ducks (2015)
- King of Mahjong (2015)
- Second Life (2015) (TV series)
- SFC 3 (2015) (TV series) episode 5
- Paranormal Mind (2015) (TV series)
- Big Fortune Hotel (2015)
- From Vegas to Macau III (2016)
- Let's Eat! (2016)
- Buddy Cops (2016)
- Three (2016)
- Line Walker (2016)
- S Storm (2016)
- Meow (2017)
- Ciao UFO (2019)
- G Storm (2021)
- Sons of the Neon Night (2025)
