= Pentalogy =

Compound literary or narrative work that is divided into five

A pentalogy (from Greek πεντα- penta-, "five" and -λογία -logia, "discourse") is a compound literary or narrative work that is explicitly divided into five parts. Although modern use of the word implies both that the parts are reasonably self-contained and that the structure was intended by the author, historically, neither was necessarily true: in fact, a pentalogia could be assembled by a later editor, just as Plotinus's Enneads were arranged in nines by Porphyry in order to create an overarching structure of six which would express the idea of perfection.

== Overview ==
In Western literature, the oldest quinary structure with great influence is the Torah or Pentateuch; in Eastern Asia, it is the Five Classics. The most famous pentalogy in medieval literature is Nizami Ganjavi's Panj Ganj, or Khamsa ("Five Treasures"), a collection of five epics which was composed in the latter half of the 12th century. They were Makhzan al-Asrar, Khusraw o Shirin, Layli o Majnun, Eskandar-nameh, and Haft Paykar. The idea was widely imitated, the number five being seen as having mystical significance; for example, the 16th-century poet Faizi, the poet laureate of Akbar's court, attempted a work on the same scale, but completed only three of the intended five parts. Other famous examples include Amir Khusro: Khamsa-e-Nizami (13th century), a pentalogy of classical romances, and Ali-Shir Nava'i: Khamsa (16th century).

The fivefold structure is usually first encountered by an English-speaking reader in the plays of William Shakespeare, which, like nearly all English, French and German plays of the period, are divided into five acts, even when the narrative of the play hardly seems to demand it; in his Essay on Comedy (1877), George Meredith wrote sardonically that "Five is dignity with a trailing robe; whereas one, or two, or three acts would be short skirts, and degrading." The origin of this tradition was examined by Brander Matthews in A Book about the Theater. It could be traced to Horace:

Neve minor, neu sit quinto productior actu Fabula, quae posci volt et spectanda reponi;	five acts the play must have, nor more nor less, To keep the stage and have a marked success.

Brander explains that Horace came to this conclusion on the basis of the drama of Euripides:

And apparently Euripides was far more interested in his play, in his plot, and in his characters, than in these extraneous lyric passages, so he reduced them to the lowest possible number, generally to four [...] separating the pathetic play into five episodes in dialog. The Alexandrian tragedians [...] accepted his form as final.

Coming long after Horace, Seneca unhesitatingly accepted all the restrictions insisted upon by the Latin lyrist. [...] It is not to be wondered at that the Italian scholars of the Renascence followed the precept of Horace and the practise of Seneca. They were far more at home in Latin than they were in Greek; and they could hardly help reading into the literature of Athens what they were already familiar with in the authors of Rome. [...] So it is that Scaliger and Minturno prescribe five acts, and that Castelvetro [...] points out that poets seem to have found the five-act form most suitable. [... T]he French dramatic poems, composed a little later, were imitations of these Italians...

quincunx

Lawrence Durrell's pentalogy The Avignon Quintet (1974–85) is an example of the reappearance of numerological ideas in modern fiction. In an attempt to subvert the normal linear structure, Durrell explicitly specified it as a quincunx and related it to the Gnostical interpretations. The best-known discussion of this shape in English literature is Thomas Browne's essay The Garden of Cyrus, which relies on Pythagorean traditions, but Durrell goes much further afield, relating it to Angkor Wat and the Kundalini. The purpose of the work was to go beyond his previous tetralogy The Alexandria Quartet. In an interview, Durrell agreed with James P. Carley that "Christianity as we know it is a quaternity with a suppressed fourth" and a critic describes his ambition as being that of "achieving the 'quintessence', that is in its combination of Eastern spirituality and Western science leading to the global vision of 'Reality Prime'."

== Literary examples ==
- The Chronicles of Prydain by Lloyd Alexander
- The Belgariad by David Eddings
- Percy Jackson & the Olympians by Rick Riordan
- The Long Earth by Terry Pratchett & Stephen Baxter

== Cinematic examples ==
- Die Hard (1988–2013)
- Hotel Transylvania (2012-2027)
- Planet of the Apes (Original Series) (1968–1973)
- Shrek (2001–2027)
- Toy Story (1995–2026)
- Transformers (2007–2017)
- Pirates of the Caribbean (2003–2017)
- Dr. Dolittle (Remake Series) (1998–2009)
- Diary of a Wimpy Kid (Animated Films) (2021–2026)

== See also ==
- Trilogy
- Tetralogy
- Hexalogy
- List of feature film series with five entries
- Pentateuch
