= Adam Pak =

Hong Kong actor (born 1982)

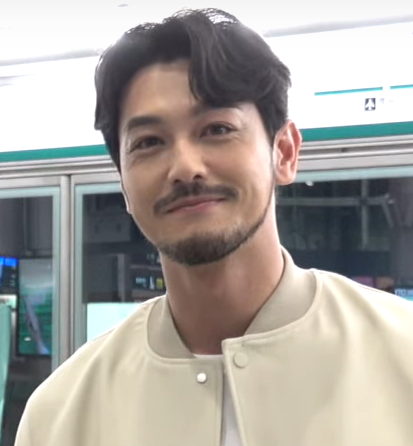
- Pak in December 2023
- Born: Pak Tin-nam; 1981 or 1982 (age 44–45); Australia
- Education: University of New South Wales (BDes)
- Occupations: Actor; model
- Years active: 2016–present

Adam Pak Tin-nam (Chinese: 栢天男, born 1981/1982) is a Hong Kong actor and model. Making his feature film debut as Thompson Yau in the L Storm (2018), Pak received a nomination for Best New Performer in the 38th Hong Kong Film Awards. He has also starred in the crime film trilogy Breakout Brothers (2021–2022), ViuTV series Ink at Tai Ping (2021), and the legal drama film A Guilty Conscience (2023).

== Early life and education ==
Pak was born in 1981 or 1982 in Australia and is of Chinese descent, with his father being Mongolian and his mother being Shanghainese. Pak's parents migrated to Australia before he was born. Despite his background, he was not fluent in Chinese and had to learn the language from scratch after moving to Hong Kong. Pak described his childhood as "unfortunate" and experienced serious bullying while growing up in Australia. He later attended the University of New South Wales, where he studied arts and design and graduated with a Bachelor of Design. After graduation, Pak interned in Amsterdam, Netherlands, working in decorative lighting design for a year. He then returned to Australia and briefly worked as a designer before feeling disillusioned with the Western environment, which led him to Hong Kong on the recommendation of his father and uncle in 2011. Upon arriving in Hong Kong, he opened an art gallery near Lan Kwai Fong and also worked as a banking salesman. However, he struggled to make a living and eventually pursued a modeling career based on a friend's recommendation. He began filming advertisements and gained public recognition for appearing in a dowry cake commercial with actress Annie Liu. Soon after, he met filmmaker Raymond Wong at a banquet, and Wong signed him as an actor of his artist agency.

== Career ==
In 2016, Pak began his acting career with a minor role in the ViuTV romance series 3X1. He then gained recognition for his breakthrough role as Thompson Yau, a mole in a money laundering cartel within a bank, in the 2018 crime film L Storm, which earned him a nomination for Best New Performer in the 38th Hong Kong Film Awards. He also had a minor role in the action film Master Z: Ip Man Legacy in the same year, and reprised a different character, Wong Ka-on, in L Storm's 2019 sequel, P Storm. After filming P Storm, Pak took an acting course taught by Liu Kai-chi. He was featured in Raymond Wong's 2020 comedy film All's Well End's Well 2020, and landed a leading role as Shinichi Kitamura in the 2021 ViuTV drama series Ink at Tai Ping, co-starring with Chrissie Chau. He played Mak Kin-tin, one of the four protagonists and cellmates attempting to break out of prison, alongside Patrick Tam, Louis Cheung, and Justin Cheung in the 2021 crime film Breakout Brothers, and reprised his role in the sequels Breakout Brothers 2 and Breakout Brothers 3 in 2022. In 2023, Pak starred in a lead role as Desmond Chung in the legal drama film A Guilty Conscience, which held the record as the highest-grossing domestic film in Hong Kong.

== Filmography ==
=== Film ===
Year	Title	Role	Notes/Ref.
2018	L Storm	Thompson Yau (游子新)	
2018	Master Z: Ip Man Legacy	Wang Yung (王勇)	
2019	P Storm	Wong Ka-on (王家安)	
2019	The Queen's Corgi	Nelson	Cantonese voice dub
2020	All's Well End's Well 2020	Adam	
2020	Hell Bank Presents: Running Ghost	Lee Chun Sek (李俊碩)	
2021	Breakout Brothers	Mak Kin-tin (麥建天)	
2022	Breakout Brothers 2	Mak Kin-tin (麥建天)	
2022	Breakout Brothers 3	Mak Kin-tin (麥建天)	
2022	Love Suddenly	Jerome	
2023	A Guilty Conscience	Desmond Cheung (鍾京頤)	
2024	Crypto Storm	Pak Yui (柏睿)	
2024	Crisis Negotiators	Sai Mok (細莫)	
2024	Emmanuelle	Mr. Bao	
2024	Blossoms Under Somewhere	Gabriel Lau (劉嘉鍵)	
2024	The Prosecutor	Lau Siu-keung (劉少強)	
2026	Cold War 1994	Air traffic controller	

=== Television ===
Year	Title	Role	Notes/Ref.
2016	3X1	Eric	Guest role
2019	Sexy Central	Geoff	Guest role
2020	Iron Ladies	Howard	Guest role
2021	Ink at Tai Ping	Shinichi Kitamura (北村真一)	Main role
2022	Inevitable	Sam Pang (彭森)	Main role
2024	The Parents League	Pierre	Guest role (season 2)
2025	Kowloon My City	Yu Chun-kei (虞俊基)	Main role

== Awards and nominations ==
Year	Award	Category	Work	Result	Ref.
2019	38th Hong Kong Film Awards	Best New Performer	L Storm	Nominated	
2022	AEG 2022	Actor with Excellent Performance (Film)	Breakout Brothers	Won	
