= Thor Lok =

Hong Kong actor and television host (born 1984)

- 駱振偉
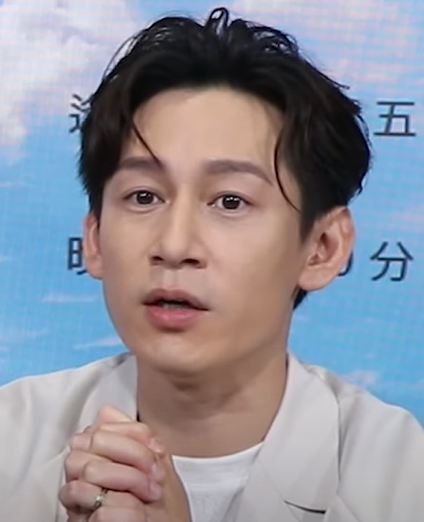
- Lok in May 2024
- Born: Lok Chun-wai; 19 October 1984 (age 41); Hong Kong
- Education: Hong Kong Polytechnic University (BSc)
- Occupations: Actor; singer
- Years active: 2007–present
- Spouse: Katrine Friis Olsen (m. 2019; div. 2025)

Thor Lok Chun-wai (Chinese: 駱振偉; born 19 October 1984) is a Hong Kong actor and television host. Joining ViuTV at its launch in 2016, he gained public recognition for hosting the music program Chill Club (2019–present). Lok won Best Supporting Actor in the 7th People's Choice Television Awards for his role as Yuen Tin-chau in the ViuTV sports drama series Rope a Dope (2022).

== Early life and education ==
Lok was born on 19 October 1984. He scored 24 marks in the Hong Kong Certificate of Education Examination and enrolled at Hong Kong Polytechnic University to pursue a Bachelor of Science in hotel management. While at university in 2004, Lok participated in a radio host contest organized by RTHK and worked part-time as a radio host for RTHK's subsidiary channel TeenPower after winning. After graduating in 2006, he spent a year working as a flight attendant for Cathay Pacific. In 2007, at the age of 22, he joined the New Talent Singing Awards, citing his interest in performance since a young age as the motivation to join the competition and he planned to enter showbiz in his twenties. He won the championship with Deep Ng's "Chess King". Following the competition, Lok was signed by Emperor Entertainment Group as a singer. However, due to a company restructure, his singing debut was indefinitely postponed, and he never recorded a single song before his contract expired three years later. During this time, he worked various part-time jobs, including in sticker manufacturing, to make a living.

== Career ==
After leaving Emperor Entertainment Group, Lok joined Now TV as a television host in 2010. In 2016, he transferred to ViuTV, the newly launched free television channel under Now TV, as a host and actor, making his acting debut in the romance series 3X1 that same year. In 2017, Lok landed his first major role as Soda, the right-hand man of a gangster played by David Siu, in the mystery thriller series Psycho Detective. He also became a recurring host on the talk show Men's Talk as part of ViuTV's Night Talk series. The following year, he continued to take on lead roles in ViuTV dramas Lost in Shell and Plan B, and made his film debut as a member of the main dragonboat team in Sunny Chan's 2018 drama Men On The Dragon.

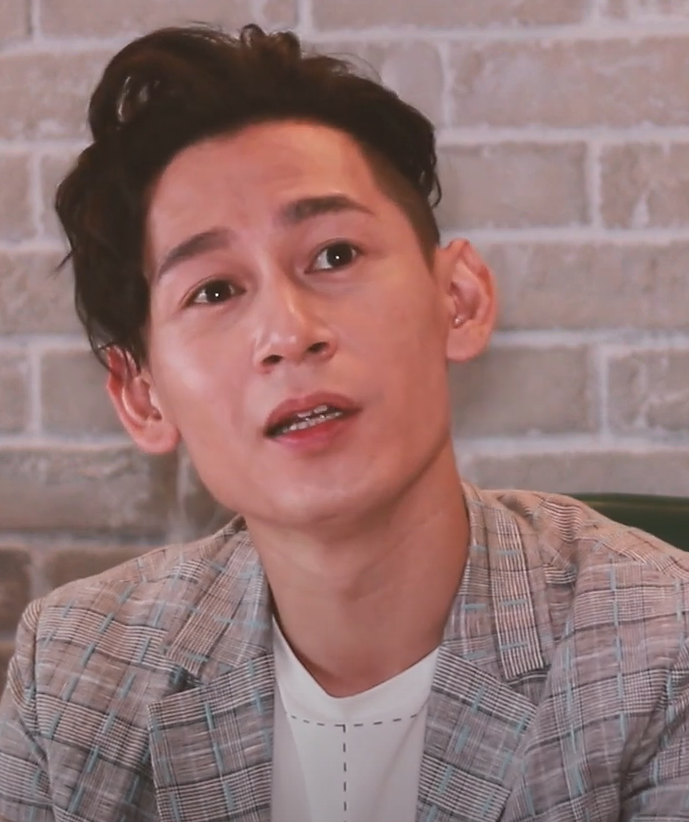
Lok interviewed by am730 in September 2020

In 2019, Lok starred in a leading role in the black comedy series Hong Kong West Side Stories and had a recurring role in the sitcom Showman's Show. He was invited to host ViuTV's flagship music program Chill Club in the same year, with producer Yip Chi-man stating that he chose Lok due to his comedic performance in Hong Kong West Side Stories. This show brought Lok public recognition, and he was the only host to remain for the second season. That same year, he played Lok Chun-sing, a love-seeking Uber driver, in the sci-fi anthology series The Republic. Shum Ngo-ming of Ming Pao praised Lok's performance as "natural" in his review for the series, and he attributed his acting abilities as the reason for him being cast as the lead in several ViuTV series consecutively.

In 2020, Lok released his first solo single, "Mature Not". He had originally requested ViuTV's CEO, Lo Ting-fai, to perform theme songs for television series, but Lo instead tailor-made the single for him. In 2021, he landed a major role as a retired contract killer codenamed Bullet in the drama series Ink at Tai Ping, followed by a supporting lead role in the 2022 drama Inevitable. He also appeared in supporting roles in the crime films Breakout Brothers 2 and Breakout Brothers 3.

In 2022, Lok received his breakout role as Yuen Tin-chau, a boxing champion, in the sports drama series Rope a Dope. His performance, particularly his death scene, garnered widespread acclaim, and he won Best Supporting Actor for this role in the 7th People's Choice Television Awards the following year. In 2023, he starred as Chow Sai-man, a selfish teacher who was forced to participate in a battle royal, in the thriller series Left On Read. The following year, he landed another leading role in the boxing-themed sports drama series Warriors Within 2.

== Personal life ==
Lok married Danish woman Katrine Friis Olsen in 2019 after dating for five years, and they held their wedding in Denmark. They announced their divorce on 26 April 2025.

== Filmography ==
=== Film ===
Year	Title	Role	Notes/Ref.
2018	Men On The Dragon	White Hair (白毛)	
2022	Breakout Brothers 2	Ho Chi-wai (何志威)	
2023	Breakout Brothers 3	Ho Chi-wai (何志威)	
2024	The Last Dance	On (安仔)	

=== Television ===
Year	Title	Role	Notes/Ref.
2016	3X1	Frankie	Recurring role
2017	Psycho Detective	Soda (梳打)	Main role
2018	Lost in Shell	Lam Man-sing (林文星)	Main role
2018	Plan B	Poison-Deaf (毒聾)	Main role
2019	Dark City	Tyson Yim (嚴泰臣)	Main role
2019	Hong Kong West Side Stories	Cheung Lok-man (張洛文)	Main role
2019	Showman's Show	Kingdom Yeung (楊君臨)	Recurring role
2019	The Republic	Lok Chun-sing (駱俊星)	Main role
2019	Reboot	Loi Fuk (來福)	Main role
2020	Iron Ladies	Jamie	Guest role
2020	Single Papa	Ted Lui	Guest role
2021	Ink at Tai Ping	Keung "Bullet" Yik-yuen (姜奕元/子彈)	Main role
2022	Inevitable	Yau Kin-wai (丘健威)	Main role
2022	Rope a Dope	Yuen Tin-chau (袁天就)	Main role
2023	Beyond the Common Ground	Lok Tsz-hong (樂子匡)	Recurring role
2023	Left On Read	Chow Sai-man (周世文)	Main role
2024	Warriors Within 2	Darwin Man (文俊樂)	Co-starring
2024	Through a Lens Darkly	Lo Ka-on (羅家安)	Main role
2024	My Lovely Liar	Chiu Chun-kit (趙俊傑)	Main role

== Awards and nominations ==
Year	Award	Category	Work	Result	Ref.
2023	7th People's Choice Television Awards	Best Supporting Actor	Rope a Dope	Won	
