= Hidden Faces (Hong Kong TV series) =

- Written by: Choi Ting-ting; Sin Siu-ling; Man Kin-Fai; Hor Lo-yan
- Directed by: Kwan Shu-ming
- Starring: Frankie Lam; David Chiang; Wilson Tsui; Kate Yeung; Leanne Ho; Lesley Chiang; Sam Chan; Rain Lau
- Country of origin: Hong Kong
- Original language: Cantonese
- No. of episodes: 18

Production
- Executive producer: Luo Yuen-har
- Production location: Hong Kong
- Editor: Choi Ting-ting
- Camera setup: Multi-camera
- Production company: Hong Kong Television Network

Original release
- Release: 24 July – 18 August 2015

Hidden Faces (Chinese: 三面形醫) is a 2015 Hong Kong medical drama series produced by Hong Kong Television Network. The first episode premiered on 24 July 2015.

== Cast ==
- Frankie Lam as Dr. Jack Cheuk, plastic surgeon
- David Chiang as Dr. Chui Chun-pong, family physician
- Wilson Tsui as Dr. Chan Pun-yuen, gynecologist
- Kate Yeung as Amber / Jodie / Phoenix
- Leanne Ho as Hui Wai-sum, nurse
- Lesley Chiang as Chui Man-yee, Dr. Chui Chun-pong's daughter
- Sam Chan as Lam Chi-ho
- Rain Lau as Chiu Choi-king, works as a waitress in Cha chaan teng
- Philip Keung as Ma Sai-kwong, Chiu Choi-king's husband
- Maria Chen as Kimmy Kam
- Queenie Chan as Regina Chung
- Benji Chiang as Avery Chow, Hui Wai-sum's husband
- Rachel Lam as Kelly, personal assistant for Dr. Jack Cheuk
- Karen Lee as Sammi, nurse
- Yetta Tse as Lau Ming-chu, nurse
- Deon Cheung as Tin Jun
- Carlos Chan as Kenny
- Yan Ng as Liu Ho-yan, Yeung Chiu-hung's wife
- Wong Kwun-bun as Yeung Chiu-hung, part of Comprehensive Social Security Assistance
- Jackeline Cheung as Sophia, Dr. Chan Pun-yuen's wife
- Candy Cheung as Abby
- Jel Lam as Alice
- Jacky Yeung as Ben
- Eddie Li as Fong Chun-wai
- Bryant Mak as Frankie
- Carlos Koo as Arthur
- Jan Tse as waitress

== Release ==
A 9-minute preview was released on HKTV's YouTube channel on 15 July 2015.
