= Doom+5 =

- Written by: Wong Wai-keung
- Directed by: Wong Kwok-keung
- Starring: Sunny Chan; Philip Keung; Poon Chan-leung; Mimi Kung; Alan Luk; Gregory Wong
- Country of origin: Hong Kong
- Original language: Cantonese
- No. of episodes: 5

Production
- Production location: Hong Kong
- Camera setup: Multi-camera
- Production company: Hong Kong Television Network

Original release
- Release: 15 June – 19 June 2015

Doom+5 (Chinese: 末日+5) is a 2015 Hong Kong television series produced by Hong Kong Television Network. The first episode premiered on 15 June 2015.

== Synopsis ==
On 5:40 a.m. January 23, 2017, a hacker hacked into the Hong Kong government's supercomputers and pirated a confidential document. The report is from NASA, stating that a large solar flare will completely destroy the Earth on 11:45 p.m. on that same date. The report is leaked to 137 Hong Kong residents' email addresses. The Hong Kong government then held the 137 people hostage, and release each person as they deem sane, perhaps to prevent the news from being spread amongst the community and cause chaos. Five of those released are shown how they will live their final hours before the end of the world.

== Cast ==
=== SAR Government ===
- Sunny Chan as Chief Executive
- Samson Yeung Ying Wai as Chief Secretary
- Savio Tsang Wai Kuen as Financial Secretary
- Emily Kwan Po Wai as Secretary for Justice

=== Episode 1: Commitment ===
- Philip Keung as Law Dai-wai
- Rachel Lam as Chan Kam-tai
- Fung So-bor as Kam Fa
- Adrian Wong as Mang Mang
- Jacky Yeung as Cheng Sai-cheong
- Wong Man-piu as Boss

=== Episode 2: Resurrection ===
- Poon Chan-leung as Lee Yat-choi
  - Justin Wong Ho-ting as young Lee Yat-choi
- Peter Lai as Lee Tung-shing
- Karen Lee as Cheung Ka-yan
  - Aki Chan as young Cheung Ka-yan
- Wu Kwing-lung as Sam
- Carlos Ernesto Koo Ayala as doctor

=== Episode 3: Monica ===
- Mimi Kung as Yau Mei-ling
  - Cherry Pau as young Yau Mei-ling
- Rain Lau Yuk Chui as Monica Lam
  - Vivian Lee as young Monica Lam
- Kathy Yuen as Ceci
- Deon Cheung Chung Chi as Kwan Chung
  - Carlos Chan as young Kwan Chung

=== Episode 4: Betrayal ===
- Alan Luk Chun Kwong as George Leung
- Bond Chan Siu Pong as To Tung
- Crystal Leung as Siu Yin-tsz
- Anita Kwan as Fiona
- Pancy Chan as Fong Wai-yee
- Tammy Ho as Sa Sa
- Jim Ping-hei as Yip Kai-fat
- Candy Chu as pregnant woman

=== Episode 5: Guardian ===
- Gregory Wong as Cheung Tsz-lok
- Yetta Tse as Wong Ning
- Bryant Mak Chi Lok as Sai Kai
- Casper Chan as Makeup store clerk

== Production ==
Filming started on 16 January 2014.

== Release ==
A 7-minute preview was released on HKTV's YouTube channel on 8 June 2015.

== Song list ==
- "Come Back to Me" (Episode 4)
