= Menus =

Menus may be:

- the plural of "menu" (see Menu for use in restaurants, and Menu (computing) for use in user interfaces)
- Les Menus, a commune in France
- "Menus" (New Girl), an episode of the TV series
- Menus of Megara, ancient Greek athlete

== See also ==
- Menu (disambiguation)
