= Menu (disambiguation) =

A menu is a list of foods at a restaurant.

Menu may also refer to:

- Menu (computing), a list of options
- Menu key, on a keyboard
- Menu (film), 1933 American film
- The Menu (TV series), 2015 Hong Kong television series
- "The Menu" (The Amazing World of Gumball), a television episode
- The Menu (2016 film), a Hong Kong film
- The Menu (2022 film), an American black comedy film
- Menu Foods, a pet food company
- Operation Menu, a bombing campaign

== People with the name ==
- Alain Menu (born 1963), Swiss racing driver
- Bernadette Menu (born 1942), French Egyptologist
- Jean-Christophe Menu (born 1964), French underground cartoonist
- Michel Menu (1916–2015), French engineer and author
