= Erena So =

Hong Kong pornographic actress (born 1997)

- 素海霖
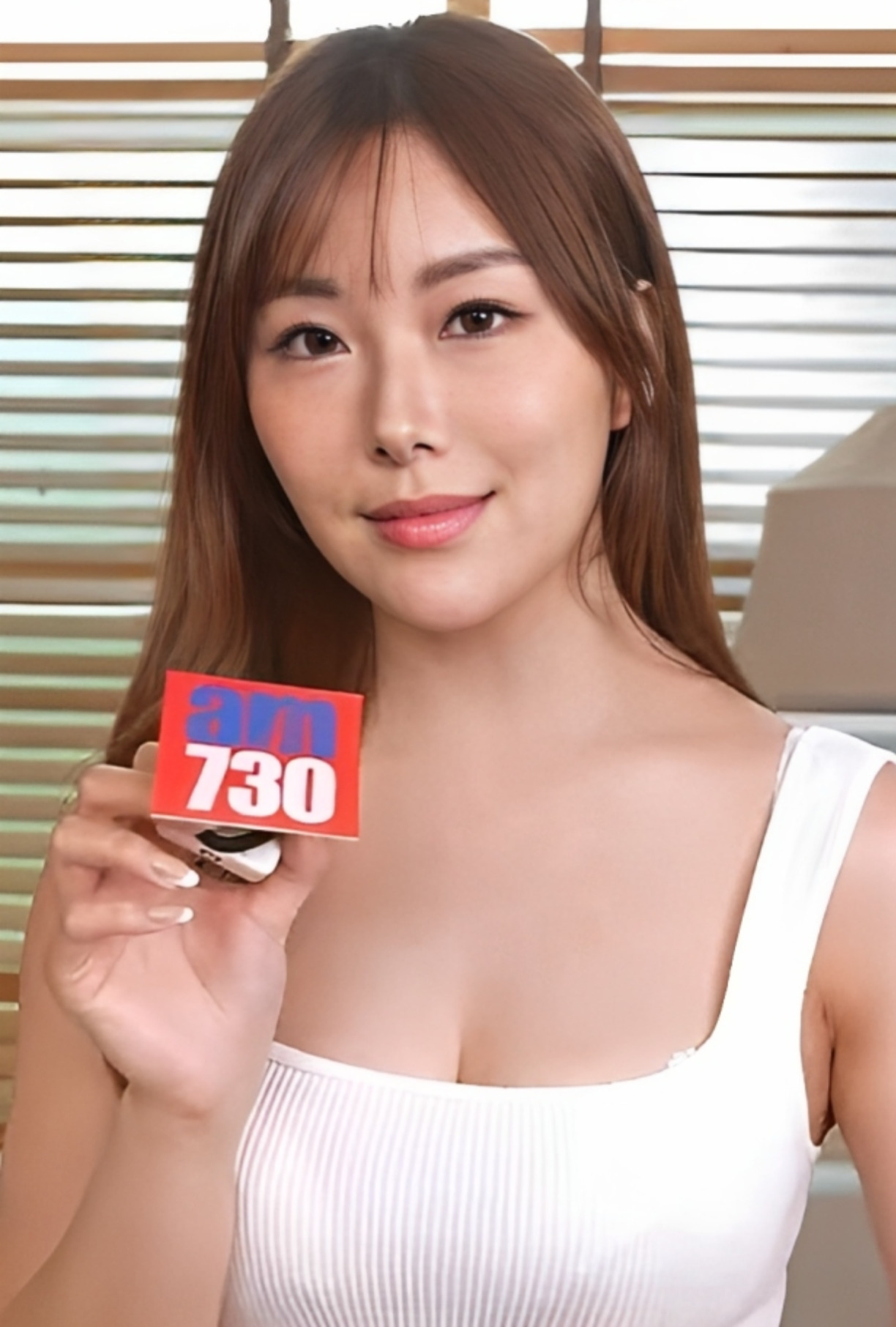
- So in May 2023
- Born: So Hoi-lam (蘇凱琳); 9 February 1997 (age 29); Hong Kong
- Other names: "So Hoi-lam" (素海霖) "Erena" (Chinese: 繪麗奈, Japanese: 絵麗奈, エレナ) "Tung So" (Chinese: 蘇浵)
- Occupations: Pornographic film actress; actress
- Years active: 2016–present
- Known for: First Hong Kongese porn actress debut in Japan
- Height: 1.63 m (5 ft 4 in)

Erena So

Chinese name
- Traditional Chinese: 蘇凱琳
- Simplified Chinese: 苏凯琳
Transcriptions
Standard Mandarin
- Hanyu Pinyin: Sū Kǎilín
Yue: Cantonese
- Jyutping: sou1 hoi2 lam4

Japanese name
- Kanji: 絵麗奈
- Hiragana: えれな
- Katakana: エレナ
Transcriptions
- Romanization: Erena

So Hoi-lam (Chinese: 蘇凱琳, born 9 February 1997), known professionally as Erena So (Chinese: 繪麗奈, Japanese: 絵麗奈, エレナ) and So Hoi-lam (Chinese: 素海霖), is a Hong Kong pornographic actress under the FALENO Star Agency. She is the first Hong Kong porn actress to debut in Japan.

== Life and career ==
So was born an only child in Hong Kong on 9 February 1997. She has stated that she was first interested in sex at the age of 12 after seeing erotic pictures and porn. She was a badminton team member while she attended primary and secondary school. After secondary school, So debuted under Big Honor Entertainment with the stage name "Tung So" (Chinese: 蘇浵) in 2016. She was the heroine of Wilfred Lau's music video "不一定" (lit. 'not necessarily') and starred in Ngok Jyu Taam by Yiu Wing Live Co. Ltd.. The latter, however, was not screened for unknown reasons. After her contract expired, she went freelance.

So operated an Instagram account with 70,000 followers, though this was closed after it was reported, leaving her suicidal. Her replacement account launched with a photo with one eye covered, a reference to a girl whose eyes were shot by Hong Kong police in the 2019–2020 Hong Kong protests. In 2021, So starred in P.T.G.F under her real name and started her Patreon account, where she sold photo collections. The following year, she shared her experiences with love and sex on Talker / Night Talk and filmed a clip of herself walking braless at Tsim Sha Tsui Promenade inspired by a similar trend in Japan.

So was introduced to FALENO Star by a Taiwanese company. In March 2023, So debuted as an AV actress in Japan, becoming the first AV actress from Hong Kong in Japan and the first foreign AV actress from that company. Her first work was Born And Raised In Hong Kong – Newcomer Erena AV debut (Japanese: 香港生まれ香港育ちの女の子 新人 絵麗奈 Avdebut), which sold 2,000 copies. She was interviewed by HK01, BBC, and Hong Kong Inmedia in 2023. When So debuted, some netizens created satirical posts mimicking an official press release by Kevin Yeung, Secretary for Culture, Sports and Tourism, based on the original press release congratulating Michelle Yeoh. The Culture, Sports and Tourism Bureau responded that the press release was fake and contacted the police about the posts.

In June 2026, So was named as an ambassador of a Malaysia-registered betting website. She was then arrested by Hong Kong police on suspicion of promoting or facilitating bookmaking in violation of the Gambling Ordinance as offshore gambling sites cannot legally operate in Hong Kong. She was released on bail, and the website took down promotional material featuring her.

== Personal life ==
As of 2023, So has been in two relationships, having left one after experiencing domestic violence; her other partner died in the 2020s. In 2023, she has described herself as "single by choice" since she does not believe in love and has stated her admiration for Tsai Ing-wen due to her integrity. In May 2025, So invited people who had cyberbullied her to talk, as she wanted to understand their motivations. Police asked them to talk indoors.

== Discography ==
=== Movies ===
Released	Name	Character
To be announced (finished in 2017)	Ngok Jyu Taam	To be announced
2021	P.T.G.F	雯雯
To be announced	Due West 2: Our Sex Vacation	To be announced

=== Music videos ===
Year	Song	Singer
2017	"不一定"	Wilfred Lau
2023	"二泊三日"	N9

=== Pornography ===
Year	Number	Name
2023	FSDSS-644	香港生まれ香港育ちの女の子 新人 絵麗奈 Avdebut
2023	FSDSS-645	初めてだらけの性感開発3 本番スペシャル！！絵麗奈
2023	FSDSS-716	世界初！香港人絵麗奈がご奉仕してくれるFALENOstar限定最高級ソープランド
2023	FSDSS-717	香港人・絵麗奈【初ドラマ】広東語講師の胸チラ無自覚誘惑に耐え切れず僕たちは言葉の壁を越えた
2023	FSDSS-752	これが噂の香港エロティカルスパ 絵麗奈
2023	FSDSS-753	今日、好きになりそうです。通訳無しの2人っきりお泊りデートにドキドキしてから交わる濃密性交 絵麗奈
