= Celia Kwok =

Hong Kong actress and fashion model

- 郭穎兒
- Born: December 9, 1986 (age 39); Hong Kong
- Occupations: Actress; fashion model
- Years active: 2008–present
- Agent: Jacso Entertainment
- Notable work: Due West: Our Sex Journey; Lan Kwai Fong 3

Chinese name
- Traditional Chinese: 郭穎兒
- Simplified Chinese: 郭颖儿
Transcriptions
Standard Mandarin
- Hanyu Pinyin: Guō Yǐngér

Celia Kwok (born 9 December 1986) is a Hong Kong actress and fashion model, known for Due West: Our Sex Journey (2012) and Lan Kwai Fong 3 (2014).

== Biography ==
A native of Hong Kong, Celia Kwok began her career as a fashion model in 2007, and signed with the agency Jacso Entertainment.

Celia Kwok had her first experience in front of the camera in 2008, and she was chosen to act as a support actor in Happy Funeral, a comedy film starring Chung Him Law, Elanne Kwong, and Eric Tsang.

Celia Kwok first rose to prominence in 2012 for playing Zeta in the erotica film Due West: Our Sex Journey.

In 2014, she co-starred with Ava Yu, Jeana Ho and Christine Ng in the film Lan Kwai Fong 3 as Papa, a kindergarten teacher.

== Filmography ==
=== Film ===
| Year | English title | Chinese title | Role | Notes |
|---|---|---|---|---|
| 2008 | Happy Funeral | 六楼后座2：家属谢礼 | | |
| 2012 | Due West: Our Sex Journey | 一路向西 | Zeta | |
| 2014 | Lan Kwai Fong 3 | 喜爱夜蒲3 | Papa | |
