= Due West: Our Sex Journey =

2012 Hong Kong film by Mark Wu

- Traditional Chinese: 一路向西
- Simplified Chinese: 一路向西
- Hanyu Pinyin: Yīlù Xiàngxī
- Directed by: Mark Wu
- Written by: Mark Wu; Fung Lam
- Based on: Dongguan Wood
- Produced by: Christopher Sun
- Starring: Justin Cheung; Gregory Wong; Celia Kwok; Jeana Ho; Daniella Wang
- Production companies: ArtisteFilm Company; China 3D Digital Distribution
- Distributed by: China 3D Digital Distribution
- Release date: 20 September 2012
- Running time: 119 minutes
- Country: Hong Kong
- Languages: Cantonese; Mandarin
- Box office: HKD 18.82 million

Due West: Our Sex Journey is a 2012 Hong Kong 3-D erotic film directed and written by Mark Wu, starring Justin Cheung, Gregory Wong, Celia Kwok, Jeana Ho, and Daniella Wang. It is based on the erotic novel entitled Dongguan Wood, first published as a series of online stories by pseudonymous author Xiang Xi Murakami Haruki. The film premiered in Hong Kong on 20 September 2012.

== Background ==
The film is based on a work of online literature, Woods in Dongguan. Westward Marukami Haruki first released the web novel in 2010 on HKGolden Forum. Kind of Culture Publications released it as a print book. It was adapted to Due West: Our Sex Journey in 2012.

== Plot ==
It tells the story of a pleasure-seeking trip by a young, middle class, Hong Kong man.

== Cast ==
- Justin Cheung as Frankie
- Gregory Wong as Wong Jing, Frankie's best friend
- Mark Wu as James, Frankie's university roommate
- Celia Kwok as Zeta, an airline stewardess, Frankie's girlfriend where he got to know her in a restaurant.
- Jeana Ho as Fish (Xiaoyu), a sexy girl in a nightclub.
- Aliza Mo as Zoey, Frankie's high school classmate whom he has a slight crush on
- Angelina Cheung as Margaret, Frankie's girlfriend when he studied in the United Kingdom.
- Daniella Wang as Celia (Xiaosi), a sex worker in a Dongguan hotel, Frankie had sex with her.
- Wylien Chiu as Susan
- Tin Kai-man as Du wen
- Tony Ho as Father of Frankie
- Ng Lai-chu as Mother of Frankie
- Eva Li as Juliet
- Polly Leung as Manager Jackie
- Jessica Kizaki as AV Girl

== Release ==
The film was released on 20 September 2012 in Hong Kong, Australia, and New Zealand. In an unusual distribution decision, some "women-only" exhibitions were scheduled in Hong Kong.

A sequel Due West 2: Our Sex Vacation was announced on 1 January 2014. No further news from 2014 until 2023, when the company announced that the movie will be produced in April 2024, starring by Yua Mikami, Yui Hatano, Minami Aizawa, and Erena So. It will be filmed in Japan.

== Reception ==
Variety's Richard Kuipers called the film "a reasonably amusing 'American Pie'-like account of a randy Hong Kong teenager’s sexual awakening [that] . . . gradually becomes flaccid as its protag enters adulthood". Derek Elley of Film Business Asia thought the film was better directed than Wu's previous efforts and "well-staged", with "lots of t&a, lots of harmless softcore sex, and lots of juvenile Cantonese comedy".

In 2012, the movie grossed more than HKD19.25 million.
