= The Menu (TV series) =

- Written by: Pun Man-hung
- Directed by: Ben Fong
- Creative director: Lam Siu-chi
- Starring: Noel Leung; Catherine Chau; Kate Yeung; Gregory Wong; Shek Sau; Benji Chiang; Kwok Fung; Felix Lok
- Ending theme: "Can't Let Go"
- Country of origin: Hong Kong
- Original language: Cantonese
- No. of episodes: 24

Production
- Production location: Hong Kong
- Camera setup: Single-camera
- Running time: 40–69 minutes
- Production company: Hong Kong Television Network

Original release
- Release: 10 March – 10 April 2015

The Menu (Chinese: 導火新聞線), is a 2015 television series produced by Hong Kong Television Network. The series is starred by Noel Leung, Catherine Chau, Kate Yeung and Gregory Wong, written by Pun Man-hung and directed by Ben Fong. The first episode premiered on 10 March 10, 2015. The plot revolves around the newspaper business.

The sequel was released on 4 August 2016 as a film.

== Cast ==
- Noel Leung as Alma Wong, Chief Editor for Smart Post
  - Janice Ting as young Alma Wong
- Catherine Chau as Fong Ying, News Editor for Smart Post
- Kate Yeung as Mallory Mak, Junior Reporter for Smart Post
- Gregory Wong as Lok Ka-fai
- Shek Sau as Eric Cheung, Alma's divorced husband
  - Sam Chan as young Eric Cheung
- Benji Chiang as Kenny Wong
- Kwok Fung as Kwan Chi-wai
- Felix Lok as Simon Ting
- Dexter Young as Mok Wun-choi, News Editor for Smart Post
- Anita Chan as Emily Yuen
- Lee Fung as Ho Lai-wan
- Brian Wong as Sou Man-hong, a police officer and Fong Ying's friend
- Cherry Pau as Winnie Chow
- Rachel Lam as Noel Lee
- Homan Ho as Sam, Alma's assistant
- Jones Lee as Shek Chun-yin, Fong Ying's ex-boyfriend
- Alan Luk as Fu Wing-hang, episode 5 to 8
- Yu Mo-lin as Hang Mou, episode 5 to 8
- Wong Man-piu as Daniel Wan
- Eddie Li as Calvin, Simon's assistant
- Wu Kwing-lung as Wong Chi-fat, Kenny Wong's triad brother
- Leung Kin-ping as KY
- Chan On-ying as Yiu Yuk-ling, Mallory's mother
- Kong Fai as Ryan Ka, ICAC investigator
- Luvin Ho as Siu Yin-wah, ICAC investigator, episode 12
- Kathy Yuen as Flora Lau, Lok Ka-fai's ex-girlfriend
- Candy Chu episode 14
- Maggie Wong as Venus Cheung, Eric's daughter
- Oscar Chan as Chris Li, Venus's husband
- Eunice Ho as Katie Yung
- Casper Chan as CID, episode 20
- Mizz Eva as Ng Hei-tung, episode 23 and 24

== Production ==
Filming started on 28 January 2013 and ended on 24 August 2013.

== Sequel ==
Filming for the sequel started on 1 December 1, 2015 and was released on 4 August 2016. With Noel Leung leaving the cast, The Menu the film starred Gregory Wong, Catherine Chau, Kate Yeung and Ng Man-tat.
