= Tan Jin Nguan =

Thai mining businessman

Tan Jin Nguan (Thai: ตันจิ้นหงวน; 4 November 1888 – 2 October 1962), also known as Luang Anuphas Phuket Kan (Thai: หลวงอนุภาษภูเก็ตการ), was a Thai businessman and tin-mining entrepreneur in Phuket province. He helped develop mechanised tin mining in Phuket and took part in trade between Phuket, Trang and Penang. He was known in Malaya as the "King of Tin" (เจ้าแห่งดีบุก).

== Early life ==
Tan Jin Nguan was born on 4 November 1888. His father, Sek Uat, was a Hokkien Chinese immigrant, and his mother, Khom, was from Phang Nga province. His father died when he was nine years old.

He studied at Wat Mongkol Nimit in Phuket before travelling to China at the age of 14. After returning to Thailand, he joined his elder brother in tin mining. He later started his own mine with four or five associates. He first used surface mining methods before changing to other methods, including เหมืองแล่น and underground shaft mining.

== Tin mining ==
Tan Jin Nguan became a mine owner in Phuket's tin-mining industry. His businesses operated in Phuket, Phang Nga and Trang. He also travelled regularly to Penang, where tin ore from southern Thailand was traded.

After learning about pump mining in Malaya, he travelled there to study the method. In 1927, he opened a pump mine at Wichit in Phuket. He first used an engine to power the mine but later bought an electric generator to reduce costs.

On 9 January 1930, a power plant supplying electricity to the mine was opened in a ceremony attended by Prince Paribatra Sukhumbandhu, Prince of Nakhon Sawan. The prince named the electrically powered mine "Chao Fa" (เหมืองเจ้าฟ้า).

Tan Jin Nguan travelled regularly to Penang, where he saw mining dredgers in operation. In 1938, he bought a mining dredger from Malaya and opened a dredging operation at Ban Hin Lat in Phang Nga.

His mining businesses also included a foundry, machine shop, sawmill, rice mill and ice plant. He operated rubber and coconut plantations and a coastal shipping service between Phuket and Kantang.

== Anuphas and Son ==
Tan Jin Nguan founded Anuphas and Son Co., Ltd. (บริษัท อนุภาษและบุตร จำกัด) on 26 March 1939. The company operated tin mines in Wichit, Phuket, and later had mining operations in other southern provinces.

The company's office is a two-storey building on Thepkrasattri Road in Phuket Old Town. The Office of Natural Resources and Environmental Policy and Planning records that the company was founded in 1939 to operate tin-mining businesses.

== Public activities and title ==
Tan Jin Nguan received the Thai noble title Luang Anuphas Phuket Kan in 1931.

He donated land for a school and a hospital in Phuket. He also helped establish a mining-industry association.

In 1953, he received the Order of the White Elephant (Fourth Class).

== Death ==
Tan Jin Nguan died on 2 October 1962. His tomb, known as the Mausoleum of Luang Anuphas Phuketkanis, is located in Wichit, Phuket, and is included in the registry of significant cultural sites maintained by the Office of Natural Resources and Environmental Policy and Planning.

Tan Jin Nguan was considered the patriarch of the Hongyok family. One of his descendants is Oak Bhavagha Hongyok, who married transgender actress and model Treechada Petcharat in 2023.
