= Catherine Chau =

Hong Kong actress (born 1979)

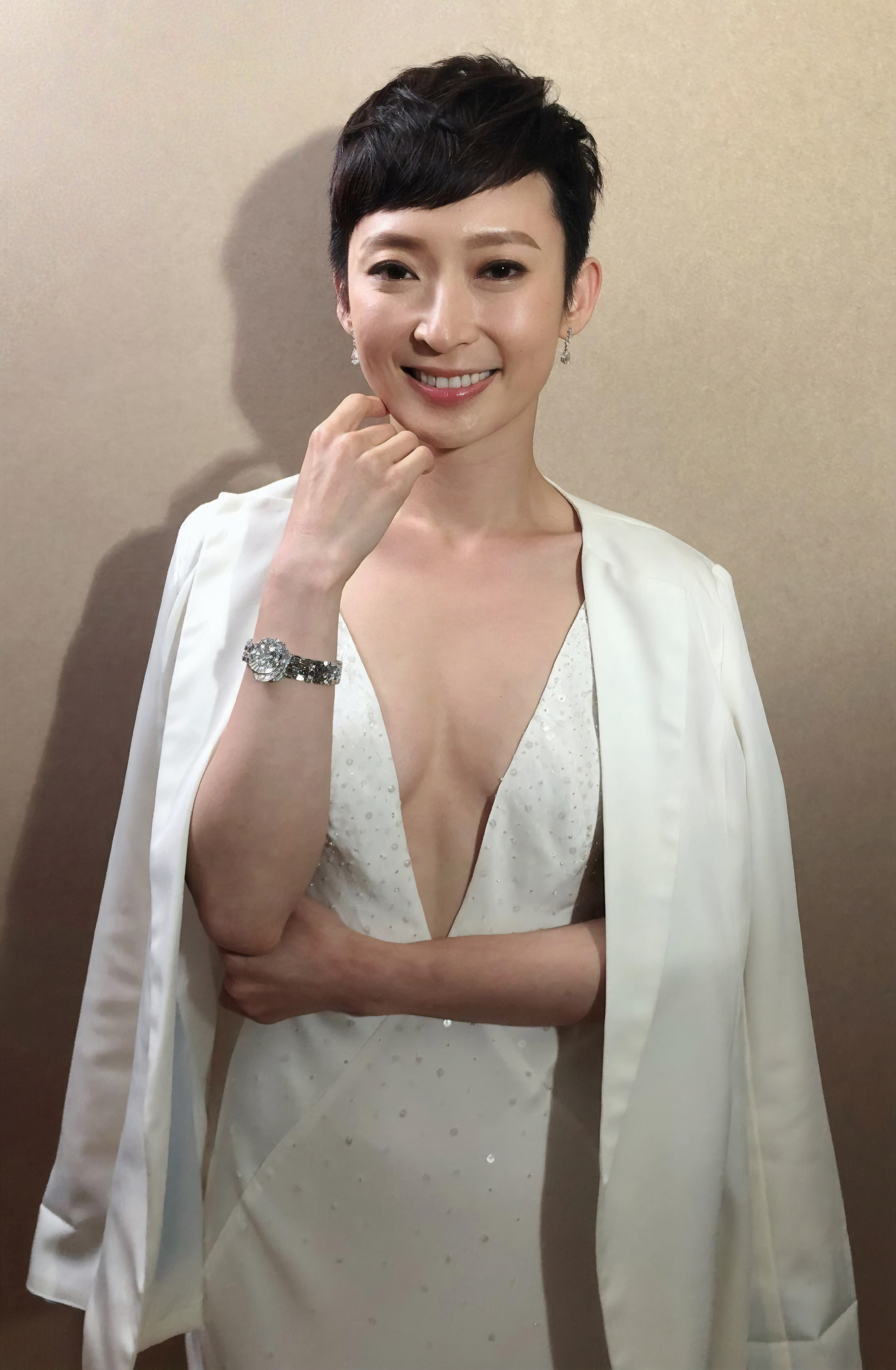
- Born: 23 July 1979 (age 47); British Hong Kong
- Occupation: Actress
- Years active: 1998–present

Catherine Chau (Chinese: 周家怡) (born 23 July 1979) is a Hong Kong actress. She started by completing the 1996 TVB Acting Class and graduating in 1998. She was nominated for Most Improved Female Artist at the TVB Anniversary Awards (2009). Her notable roles include The Dance of Passion (2006), My Sister of Eternal Flower (2011), Men with No Shadows (2011), The Menu (2015) and Kids' Lives Matter (2021).

== Filmography ==
=== Television dramas ===
| Year | Title | Role |
|---|---|---|
| 1999 | Detective Investigation Files IV | Wong Kei-kei (黃琪琪) |
| 2002 | Where the Legend Begins | Fan Fong (芬芳) |
| 2002 | Take My Word For It | Yip Ho-hei (葉可喜) |
| 2003 | Life Begins at Forty | Karen |
| 2004 | Angels of Mission | Jammy |
| 2004 | To Catch the Uncatchable | Judy |
| 2004 | War and Beauty | Bak Lan (白蘭) |
| 2005 | The Prince's Shadow | Consort Wai |
| 2005 | Misleading Track | BoBo |
| 2005 | Revolving Doors of Vengeance | Cheuk Ying-nuen (卓英媛) |
| 2005 | Hidden Treasures | Lancy |
| 2005 | The Herbalist's Manual | Sau Chi (秀 智) |
| 2006 | Bar Bender | Shum Gin-ping (岑健萍) |
| 2006 | The Dance of Passion | Mao Siu-kam (茅小琴) |
| 2006 | C.I.B. Files | May |
| 2006 | To Grow with Love | Eunice |
| 2006 | Forensic Heroes | A Secretary |
| 2007 | Best Selling Secrets | Yin Wai-Sun's ex-girlfriend |
| 2007 | The Family Link | Lo Fo-tong (老火湯) |
| 2007 | The Ultimate Crime Fighter | Chow Lam May Yee (周林美兒) |
| 2008 | Love Exchange | Wing |
| 2008 | The Gem of Life | Joey |
| 2008 | When Easterly Showers Fall on the Sunny West | Man Hung (曼紅) |
| 2009 | The King of Snooker | Chow Hin-wai (周顯慧) |
| 2009 | A Bride for a Ride | Sou Kam (素琴) |
| 2010 | Fly with Me | Selina |
| 2010 | Beauty Knows No Pain | |
| 2010 | Growing Through Life | Kay |
| 2010 | Can't Buy Me Love | |
| 2010 | Some Day | |
| 2010-2011 | Show Me the Happy | Elaine |
| 2010 | Twilight Investigation | |
| 2010-2011 | Home Troopers | Miss Yip |
| 2011 | Grace Under Fire | Wong Yee-mui |
| 2011 | My Sister of Eternal Flower | Ha Kau-kau (哈皎皎) |
| 2011 | Ghetto Justice | So Shan |
| 2011 | Men with No Shadows | Man Ka-ling (文嘉玲) |
| 2011-2012 | When Heaven Burns | Mabel |
| 2012 | The Hippocratic Crush | Wong Hoi-kei |
| 2012 | Gloves Come Off | Tsui Suk-wai |
| 2012 | Master of Play | |
| 2013 | A Happy Life | Yu Jiao |
| 2015 | The Menu | Fong Ying |
| 2015 | IPCC Files 2015 | Madam Mok |
| 2015 | Elite Brigade III | |
| 2016 | Margaret and David: Green Beans | |
| 2017 | Om Buds Man Special 2017 | Claire |
| 2019 | Haters Gonna Stay | nurse |
| 2020 | The Gutter | Sammy |
| 2021 | Kids' Lives Matter | Dr. Mak Hoi-kay (麥海琪) |
| 2022 | The Parents League | Venus |
| 2024 | Through a Lens Darkly | |
| 2024 | The Parents League 2 | |
| 2025 | Games of Two Halves | |

=== Films ===
| Year | Title | Role |
|---|---|---|
| 2007 | House of the Invisibles | |
| 2011 | I Love Hong Kong | |
| 2014 | Twilight Online | |
| 2015 | Ten Years: Dialect | Office Lady |
| 2016 | Heaven in the Dark | |
| 2016 | The Menu | Fong Ying |
| 2016 | The Moment | |
| 2018 | Agent Mr Chan | |
| 2018 | Project Gutenberg | Inspector Ho Wai-lam |
| 2022 | Life Must Go On | Yanki |
| 2023 | Yum Investigation | |
| 2023 | Death Notice | |
| 2023 | The Goldfinger | Suen Wei |
| 2024 | We are Family | |
| 2024 | The Last Dance | Jade |
