= Comeuppance (film) =

2000 Hong Kong film by Derek Chiu

Comeuppance (天有眼) is a 2000 Hong Kong comedy thriller film directed by Derek Chiu, with Jordan Chan and Patrick Tam.
