= Breakout Brothers =

2020 Hong Kong film by Mak Ho-pong

- Film poster
- Traditional Chinese: 逃獄兄弟
- Simplified Chinese: 逃狱兄弟
- Hanyu Pinyin: Táo Yù Xiōng Dì
- Jyutping: Tou4 Jeok6 Hing1 Dai6
- Directed by: Mak Ho-pong
- Screenplay by: Edmond Wong
- Produced by: Ng Kin-hung; Edmond Wong
- Starring: Patrick Tam; Louis Cheung; Adam Pak; Justin Cheung
- Cinematography: Kubbie Tsoi
- Edited by: Chow Kai-pong
- Music by: Noël Li
- Production companies: Mandarin Motion Pictures; Local Production
- Distributed by: Mandarin Films Distribution
- Release dates: 3 December 2020 (Singapore); 25 February 2021 (Hong Kong)
- Country: Hong Kong
- Language: Cantonese

Breakout Brothers is a 2020 Hong Kong action comedy-drama film directed by Mak Ho-pong and starring Patrick Tam, Louis Cheung, Adam Pak and Justin Cheung as four prisoners who work together to plan their escape. The film was theatrically released on 3 December 2020 in Singapore and on 25 February 2021 in Hong Kong.

A sequel to the film, titled Breakout Brothers 2, was released on 13 January 2022.

== Plot ==
The prison has been led by two powerful prisoners, who are triad leader Big Roller (Patrick Tam) and life imprisoned inmate Scar (Justin Cheung). The steady life in prison changes with the arrival of wrongly accused inmate Mak Kin-tin (Adam Pak).

First, Kin-tin was constantly being threatened by Scar, which led Kin-tin to give up on his appeal request and was later bullied by other inmates when they found out he was involved with destroying the storage unit with the belongings Big Roller's presumed deceased daughter, when in actuality, Kin-tin was framed. In order to protect his life, Kin-tin takes the suggestion of his cellmate, Ho-ching (Louis Cheung), and they work together to plan a precise escape from prison.

In order to avoid the strict supervision of Warden Tang (Kenny Wong), Ho-ching persuades Big Roller to help them but informing him that his daughter is alive and they work together along with Kin-tin to devise an escape plan utilizing each one of their strengths. However, Scar also discovers the plan and the trio reluctantly let him join. As a result, these four inmates put aside past rivalry and work together to breakout of prison.

== Cast ==
- Patrick Tam as Lam Kwok-lung (林國龍), nicknamed Big Roller (滾筒), a ruthless triad who has been imprisoned for 20 years for manslaughter after killing an assassin sent from a rival who attacked him and his wife and daughter. When he discovered Mak Kin-tin was involved in destroying a storage unit containing his presumed deceased daughter's belongings, he loses his temper and releases all his anger on Kin-tin.
- Louis Cheung as Chan Ho-ching (陳浩正), a petty criminal who goes to prison to ensure he gets three meals a day. His diplomatic personality helps him survive in a prison full of gangs and he even gives advice to newbie Kin-tin as a senior. When his girlfriend revealed to him that his mother got into an accident and his request for conditional release gets rejected, he develops thoughts to breakout.
- Adam Pak as Mak Kin-tin (麥建天), chief advisor of a construction company who was imprisoned after being framed by his partner for fraud. He is an aloof loner who does not believe in true friendship. In prison, he faces prejudice from Big Roller and Scar and his life becomes a living hell.
- Justin Cheung as Scar (刀疤), an inmate who was set by Warden Tang to balance out Big Roller's power in prison and rises to the same status as Big Roller in prison under Tang's protection. He was asked by Kin-tin's partner to threaten and harass Kin-tin so the latter would give up applying for an appeal.
- Kenny Wong as Warden Tang (鄧獄長), the prison superintendent who balances out Big Roller and Scar's power in prison. While he was about to be promoted, Kin-tin enters prison and creates chaos between Big Roller and Scar, so Tang gives a hard time to the prisoners in order to maintain his management record.
- Jeana Ho as Suet-yee (雪怡), Chan Ho-ching's girlfriend who takes care of his mother while he is imprisoned.
- Tyson Chak as Chickenshit Keung (騰雞強), a prison guard.
- Stefan Wong as Chow Chi-wing (皺志榮), Kin-tin's partner who committed fraud and frames Mak for it, causing the latter to be imprisoned.
- Violet Lee as Ho-ching's mother who suddenly suffered from kidney failure and needs a kidney transplant.
- Christine Ng as Mei-ling (美玲), Roller's wife who have been living in fear due to her husband's identity and persuaded him to leave the triads after giving birth to their daughter, Wing-kei. She eventually decided to leave Big Roller after he murders another member of the same triad during an attack while lying to him that their daughter was killed from that attack. (special appearance)
- Hanna Chan as Wing-kei (穎琪), Roller and Mei-ling's daughter. (guest appearance)

== Release ==
Breakout Brothers was theatrically released on 3 December 2020 in Singapore The film was set to open the same day in Hong Kong, due to cinema closures from 2 December 2020 to 17 February 2021 amid the fourth wave of the COVID-19 pandemic in Hong Kong, the film's release was postponed to 25 February 2021 in the territory. The film was presented at the Busan International Film Festival's virtual Asian Contents & Film Market on 27 October 2020.

== Sequel ==
A sequel to the film, Breakout Brothers 2, was released on 13 January 2022 in Macau and Singapore, and on 28 April 2022 in Hong Kong.
