= Lan Yan =

Chinese actress, pop singer, and model

Lan Xin Yan
- Born: 9 March 1990 (age 36); Shanghai, China
- Other names: Leni Lan, Crazybarby, Lan Xin Yan, ЛаньЯнь
- Occupations: Actress; singer; businesswoman
- Years active: 2003–present

Chinese name
- Traditional Chinese: 藍心妍
- Simplified Chinese: 蓝心妍
Transcriptions
Standard Mandarin
- Hanyu Pinyin: Lán Xin Yàn

Lan Yan (Chinese: 蓝心妍, original Chinese name: 蓝燕; English: Leni Lan; born 9 March 1990), also known by her stage name, Crazybarby, is a Chinese actress, pop singer, and model, based in Hong Kong.

== Early life ==
Lan was born in Shanghai before moving to Hong Kong at the age of 18. She designed her stage name "Crazybarby" by combining her legal given name, "Crazy", and her family-given nickname, "Barby".

She graduated from the Acting Department of the Shanghai Theatre Academy and the Hong Kong Academy for Performing Arts.

== Career ==
In 2005, Lan played her first starring role in the romance movie Everlasting Regret, directed by Stanley Kwan. In 2006, she starred in the Russian romance movie Potseluy babochki (Kiss of a Butterfly), which beat Pirates of the Caribbean: Dead Man's Chest at the Russian box office and became the highest grossing domestic film and second-highest-grossing film of that year. She was nominated for the Russian Film Festival Rookie of the Year Award and became the first actress of Chinese descent to become famous in the Russian film industry.

In 2007, Lan was scouted by Albert Yeung, who invited her to Hong Kong and sign with JCE Movies. With the company's support, she obtained a Hong Kong identity card through the Quality Migrant Admission Scheme, and began Cantonese acting classes at the Hong Kong Academy for Performing Arts.

In 2011, Lan starred in 3D Sex and Zen: Extreme Ecstasy, which became the highest grossing Hong Kong film of the year, with a box office record of HK$41 million.

In 2012, Lan starred in the Hunan Satellite TV costume drama Heroes of Sui and Tang Dynasties 1 & 2, which topped viewership numbers. Her 2013 thriller movie Ecstasy Room Escape was nominated for the Chinese American Film Festival Golden Angel Award.

== Filmography ==
=== Films ===
Year	English Title	Chinese Title	Role	Notes
2003	Purple Butterfly	《紫蝴蝶》	A Zi	
2003	Deng Xiao Ping In 1928	《邓小平1928》	Chen Bilan	
2005	Everlasting Regret	《长恨歌》	Duan Wenfang	
2006	Potseluy babochki (Kiss of a Butterfly)	《蝴蝶之吻》	Li	
2010	Home Run	《回家的路》 《疯狂直播秀》	Marry	
2011	3D Sex and Zen: Extreme Ecstasy	《3D肉蒲团之极乐宝鉴》	Tie Yuxiang	
2011	Happiness 59 Cm	《幸福59厘米》	Wang Xuehong	
2012	Good for Nothing Heros	《请叫我英雄》	Kitty	
2013	Adolescent Hormone	《青春荷尔蒙》	Cui Na	
2013	The Mobile Young Ages	《行走的青春》	You Mei	
2013	Lost: Room Escape	《迷魂之密室逃脱》	Lu Qi	
2014	Long's Story	《硬汉奶爸》	He Ran	
2015	Fright Step by Step	《3D步步倞魂》	Mo Yan, Xiao Wei	
2015	Crazy New Year's Eve	《一路倞喜》	WIN	
2015	The Stormy Night	《雨夜惊魂》	Dou Kou	
2016	Insomnia Lover	失眠男女	Leni	
2017	Fight against Buddha	斗战胜佛	Queen Xiu Luo	
2018	Blue Goldfish	《蓝色金鱼》	Zi Guo	
2018	Kung Fu Tie Bi Lan	铁壁岚之拳	Xiu Juan	
2019	Super Girlfriend	非常闺蜜	Ning Xue	
2019	Baby Task Group	宝贝特攻2:惊天计划	Liu Qiong	
2019	Dream of Gold City	梦醒黄金城	Zhao Xue Ru	
2019	Sar	特区	Bing Bing	
2020	Kung Fu Master Su	武神苏乞儿	Ming Xin	

=== Television ===
Year	English title	Chinese title	Role	Notes
2004	Hosenrolle	《反串》	Xiao Zhang	
2005	Legend: Fantasy Yin and Shang Dynasties	《传奇幻想殷商》	ZI Yi	
2005	Waiting Hall	《候机大厅》	Liu Yanan	
2006	White Snow	《白雪皑皑》	Yi Sha	
2008	Snow Red	《雪中红》	Jiang Yuling	
2008	Phantom of the Fog City	《雾都魅影》	Yu Ruotong	
2008	Sofia's Diary China	《苏菲日记2》	Li Beibei	
2009	Diamond Family	《钻石豪门》	Yu Aimei	
2010	Housekeeper	《大管家/暗战金陵》	He Xingfang	
2011	The Seventh Fairy	《天地姻缘七仙女》	Eldest fairy Honger	
2012	Secret History of Princess Taiping	《太平公主秘史》	Empress Wang	
2012	Bloody Dawn	《血色黎明》	Mei Yu and Xia He	
2012	Heroes of Sui and Tang Dynasties 1 & 2	《隋唐英雄1&2》	Consort Chen	
2013	Diao Si Man 2	《屌丝男士2》	Diors goddess	
2015	Female Bodyguard of Song Dynasty	《龙汇镖局之大宋女镖师》	Ou Yang Ruonan	
2015	Firm of Couterattack	《配角逆袭事务所》	Daji	
2019	Chong Er's Preach	《重耳傳奇》	Jia Ji	
2020	Firm of Couterattack	《巫蠱筆記》	He Nai	
