= The Best Plan Is No Plan =

2013 Hong Kong film by Patrick Kong

- Film poster
- Directed by: Patrick Kong
- Written by: Patrick Kong
- Produced by: Paco Wong Pak-Go
- Starring: Sammy Sum; Hanjin Tan; Justin Cheung
- Cinematography: O Sing-Pui
- Edited by: Li Ka-Wing
- Music by: Ben Chong Tung-Yan; Tang Chi-Wai
- Production company: Sun Entertainment Culture Limited
- Release date: 17 October 2013
- Running time: 96 minutes
- Country: Hong Kong
- Language: Cantonese
- Box office: ¥0.66 million (China)

The Best Plan Is No Plan is a 2013 Hong Kong romantic comedy drama film directed by Patrick Kong. It was released on 17 October.

== Cast ==
- Sammy Sum
- Hanjin Tan
- Justin Cheung
- Shiga Lin
- Angel Chiang
- Jinny Ng
- Elva Ni
- Jacquelin Chong
- Terence Siufay
- Yao Meng
- Hoi-Pang Lo
- Siu Yam-yam
- Bob Lam
- Linah Matsuoka
- Rainky Wai
- Candy Man

== Reception ==
=== Box office ===
By 21 November 2014, the film had earned ¥0.66 million at the Chinese box office.
