= Death Notice (film) =

2023 Hong Kong film by Herman Yau

- Official film poster
- Traditional Chinese: 暗殺風暴
- Simplified Chinese: 暗杀风暴
- Hanyu Pinyin: Àn Shā Fēng Bào
- Jyutping: Ngam3 Saat3 Fung1 Bou6
- Directed by: Herman Yau
- Written by: Toni Shum
- Based on: Death Notice by Zhou Haohui
- Produced by: Allen Chan; Yang Xianghua; Li Yansong
- Starring: Louis Koo; Julian Cheung; Francis Ng; Myolie Wu; Chrissie Chau
- Cinematography: Mandy Ngai
- Edited by: Azrael Chung
- Music by: Mak Chun Hung
- Production companies: Sil-Metropole Organisation; Sublime Media Group; Shanghai Tao Piao Piao Movie & TV Culture; Beijing New Splendid Entertainment iQlYl Motion Pictures (Beijing); Liston Limited; Wishart Media; Beijing Changxiang New Film; Grand Olympus Films; Nanjing Boyuan Film & TV Media; D.Run Culture; Shanghai Yuanna Film Group; Beijing Junheng Film & TV Media; Guangzhou People Funded Best Choice Internet; Zhijiang Film Group; Xiamen Jinyi Media; Calxon Cinema
- Distributed by: Media Asia Distributions; Screen Media; Intercontinental Film Distributors (HK); Panorama Entertainment
- Release date: 18 August 2023
- Running time: 100 minutes
- Country: Hong Kong
- Language: Cantonese
- Budget: US$16 million
- Box office: US$615,042

Death Notice, previously known as Death Notify, is a 2023 Hong Kong action thriller film directed by Herman Yau and starring Louis Koo, Julian Cheung and Francis Ng. Based on the Chinese novel of the same title by Zhou Haohui, production for the film began in April 2018.

Originally set for theatrical release on 9 December 2021 in Hong Kong, the film's release was first postponed to 31 March 2022 before it was pushed back again to 18 August 2023.

== Plot ==
In Hong Kong, a vigilante serial killer by the name of Darker leaves death notices stating when and how he will murder a victim. Even if the victim reports it to the police and receives protection, Darker can easily break through and execute them.

Ten years ago, Darker orchestrated a mysterious explosion of Man Wah, the girlfriend of police inspector Law Fei and Yeung Tsz Bong, a former senior CIB inspector and Law's best friend, with the only survivor and witness being Wong Siu-ping, a homeless man who was disabled and his face severely burnt and disfigured as a result. Darker reappears again in the present sending out death notices and executing violent and brutal punishments, challenging the police to a face off with an unimaginable conspiracy behind.

In response, the police set up a special task force led by Chief Superintendent Hon Ho, where Law is also a member of. Law joins after the death of his friend, Cheung Kok Ming, who was targeted by Darker earlier. Hon and Law collaborates with Wong to for further clues, but they are always fail in every operation and cannot save the victims. Law, whose is skilled in observation and analysis, is able to predict Darker's execution plan every time, but is always a step too late.

As each execution occurs, Law starts to notice the hidden secrets behind where Darker's true identity is gradually revealed as conflict and distrust begins to form between Law and Hon when politician Hon Siu-hung is killed in a van explosion as the 2nd target despite police protection. When they fail to save the third target, Pang Kwong Fook, a suspect in killing Hon's partner and Wan Kim's brother, Chiu, 10 years prior when Hon and Chiu had been in pursuit of him and his partner. When they find Pang's location, they successfully disarmed the bomb to prevent it from exploding, but his throat is found slit and the bomb reactivates forcing the trio to flee. Law is then placed under arrest as Hon finds similar death notices that Law and Yeung had created in relation to the death of the former superintendent who had sexually assaulted Yeung's girlfriend. He is then released with the aide of Leung Yam, who is the only one that believes he is innocent.

The fourth target is revealed to be businessman Tang Wah, who is leaving Hong Kong for safety. Law interrogates Wong for clues again and has pieced everything together. The real Wong died in the explosion and Scar Seven, Yeung's most trusted informant had been impersonating Wong as the assassination for Tang is still in process. Law subdues Scar Seven as the police arrest the latter and rushes to the airport to impede the assassination of Tang. He then finds Yeung is still alive during a pursuit after having done plastic surgery to change his appearance. Yeung had orchestrated the warehouse explosion intending to kill Man Wah and Wong taking over the latter's identity to orchestrate the murders. When Man Wah had found out about his deceit, she detonated the trigger herself to sabotage Yeung's plan. Yeung had Scar Seven impersonate Wong to misguide Law and Leung so he could kill his targets in what seem to be vigilante killings, but in reality, they had been for a real estate developer to wipe out his competitors (aside from Pang). Yeung has planted another bomb similar to the one he planted on Man. Law is able to disfigure it in time however because there isn't a complex configuration thus making Yeung's plan backfire. Yeung is taken into custody but warns Law that the real Darker is still out there as Yeung is just a pawn for a real estate developer who has been using Yeung to wipe out their competitors.

While protecting Tang with his team at the airport, Hon is blackmailed by Darker with a video revealing that Hon had slit Pang's throat during the bomb detonation. Darker calls Hon and threatens to release the video if Hon interferes with his plan Hon, desperate to find the real Darker, calls the number which rings Tang's phone. Hon mistakenly believing he is Darker, shoots and kills him. This results in Hon's arrest as well.

In the end, Law reveals Hon had lied in court during the testimony that when he and Chiu were in pursuit of Pang that Pang shot Chiu when in reality, Hon accidentally shot and killed Chiu, mistaking him for Pang's partner. Thus, Hon had killed Pang and was trying to find the real Darker to protect his secret of being Chiu's real killer, but ended up getting manipulated into shooting Tang. This is also confirmed by Leung who had run a forensics check on Chiu's jacket. Furious, Wan confronts Hon about the night which Hon reveals he had accidentally shot Chiu during the pursuit of Pang. Hon apologizes to Wan, but Wan rejects his apology. Law concludes that Hon and Darker aren't any different.

The film concludes while revealing Hon Ho and Yeung Chi Bong were charged for their crimes and that the police are still trying to find the real Darker.

== Cast ==
- Louis Koo plays three roles in the movie:
  - Yeung Chi Bong (袁志邦)'s surgically altered appearance
  - Wong Siu-ping (黃少平), a homeless man who is the sole survivor of an explosion executed by Darker a decade ago and became disabled and disfigured as a result. Wong was Law's informant until it was revealed the real Wong had died in the explosion and was being impersonated by Scar Seven
  - Scar Seven (刀疤七), A store owner who was Yeung's informant. Yeung had paid him to impersonate Wong.
- Julian Cheung as Law Fei (羅飛), a chief police inspector of the New Territories South region and a prodigy of criminal physiology.
- Francis Ng as Hon Ho (韓灝), a senior superintendent of the Kowloon East region and head of the special task force.
- Myolie Wu as Man Wah (孟芸), Law's girlfriend.
- Chrissie Chau as Leung Yam (梁音), senior inspector of the Identification Bureau.
- Charmaine Sheh as Hon Siu-hung (韓少虹), a politician who is one of Darker's murder targets. She was his second target and killed in a van explosion under police protection.
- Simon Yam as Officer Tsang (曾Sir), Deputy Commissioner of Police (Operation).
- Ray Lui as Tang Wah (鄧驊), chairman of Kong Ho Corporation (江河集團) who is one of Darker's murder targets. He is the fourth and final target who is murdered by Hon, who mistakenly thinks he is Darker.
- Philip Keung as Chiu, a policeman who is murdered by Hon Ho
- Danny Chan as Yeung Chi Bong (袁志邦) - Former lead inspector of CIB who was suspended after the death of his girlfriend
- Timmy Hung
- Ruby Lam
- Babyjohn Choi as Wan Kim, a subordinate of Hon and the late brother of Chiu
- Justin Cheung
- Raymond Chow
- 6-Wing as 曾日華
- Law Lan
- Waise Lee as Cheung Kok Ming (鄭郝明) - Former North District Commander of the Police Force who was retired and worked as the manager of Longteng Real Estate Development Department. He is the first target of Darker
- Kenny Wong as Aaron - Tang's personal assistant
- Ben Ng as Pang Kwong Fook (彭廣福) - A criminal, Darker's third target. He was wanted for ransom in pursuit by Hon and Chiu. Hon lied that Pang had shot Chiu when in reality, Hon shot Chiu mistaking him for Pang's partner when Chiu was trying to shoot Pang.
- May Law
- Catherine Chau
- Cheung Kwok-keung
- Deno Cheung
- David Siu
- Tony Ho

== Production ==
=== Development ===
The project was first announced at the 2016 Hong Kong Filmart as a film adaptation of the Chinese novel, Death Notice by Zhou Haohui. The film was slated to begin production during the same year with a budget of ¥100 million (US$16 million) and Philip Yung attached as director. On 6 April of the same year, it was reported that the film will star Aaron Kwok, Louis Koo and Julian Cheung.

News for the project did not surface until Zhao Haohui posted on his Sina Weibo in February 2018 stating a film adaptation of his novel will begin shooting in July of the same year with Koo, Cheung and Francis Ng confirmed to star. The project was later promoted at the 2018 Hong Kong Filmart on 21 March, where it was attended by director Herman Yau, cast members Koo, Ng, Cheung, Chau, Myolie Wu and Justin Cheung.

=== Filming ===
Filming for Death Notice began in April 2018. On 16 April at 6:00 AM, filming of a firearm shootout scene took place in an apartment building in Sham Shui Po with cast members Ng, Cheung, Wu and Babyjohn Choi. However, at 11:00 AM, an object at the back stairs of the building caught on fire, and the entire cast and crew, along with residents of the apartment, had to evacuate. Filming resumed at the location 13 minutes after firefighters put out the fire before shooting ended at 6:00PM.

On 2 May 2018, filming took place at the Lei Yue Mun Park and Holiday Village, where the film's production start ceremony was also held with director Yau and cast members Koo, Ng, Cheung, Wu, Chrissie Chau, Timmy Hung, 6-Wing, Justin Cheung, Babyjohn Choi and Tony Hung present. There, Koo also revealed that he will be portraying four roles in the film, for which he will be wearing different makeup for each of them that requires four to five hours to put on.

== Release ==
Death Notice was originally set to be theatrically released in Hong Kong on 9 December 2021, but it was later pushed back to 31 March 2022, with "marketing correction" being cited for the reason. However, the film's release was delayed again due to cinema closures amid the fifth wave of the COVID-19 pandemic in Hong Kong before setting a new release date of 18 August 2023.

== Reception ==
=== Box office ===
Death Notice debuted at No. 9 during its opening weekend in Hong Kong, grossing HK$1,457,003 (US$186,018) after its first three days of release and bringing in a total of HK$1,490,503 (US$190,295) including preview screenings. The film moved up to No. 2 in its second weekend grossing HK$2,109,908 (US$269,001), while having grossed a total of HK$3,600,411 (US$459,031) by then. During its third weekend, the film grossed HK$1,224,622 (US$156,101), coming in at No. 6, while accumulating a total gross of HK$4,825,033 (US$615,042) by then. The film dropped to No. 10 in its fourth weekend grossing HK$499,651, while accumulating a total gross of HK$5,324,684 so far.

=== Critical reception ===
Edmund Lee of the South China Morning Post gave the film a score of 3/5, praising Louis Koo's performance, the film's dense plot and furious pacing.
