= Breakout Brothers 2 =

2022 Hong Kong film by Mak Ho-pong

- Film poster
- Traditional Chinese: 逃獄兄弟2
- Simplified Chinese: 逃狱兄弟2
- Hanyu Pinyin: Táo Yù Xiōng Dì Èr
- Jyutping: Tou4 Jeok6 Hing1 Dai6 Ji6
- Directed by: Mak Ho-pong
- Screenplay by: Edmond Wong
- Produced by: Ng Kin-hung; Edmond Wong
- Starring: Patrick Tam; Louis Cheung; Ron Ng; Justin Cheung; Adam Pak; Kenny Wong
- Cinematography: Ray Cheung
- Edited by: Chow Kai-pong
- Music by: Day Tai
- Production companies: Mandarin Motion Pictures; Local Production
- Distributed by: Mandarin Films Distribution
- Release dates: 13 January 2022 (Macau, Singapore); 28 April 2022 (Hong Kong)
- Running time: 86 minutes
- Country: Hong Kong
- Language: Cantonese
- Box office: HK$412,175

Breakout Brothers 2 is a 2022 Hong Kong action comedy film directed by Mak Ho-pong and starring Patrick Tam, Louis Cheung, Ron Ng, Justin Cheung, Adam Pak and Kenny Wong. A sequel to the 2020 film, Breakout Brothers, the film tells the story of a remanded entrepreneur who initially bribes and then blackmails four inmates who once planned a successful breakout in the previous film to help him set up an escape plan.

The film was released on 13 January 2022 in Macau and Singapore, and on 28 April 2022 in Hong Kong. A sequel to the film, titled Breakout Brothers 3, is set for release on 2 June 2022 and will be the final instalment of the series.

== Plot ==
After their breakout from the previous film, Big Roller, Kin-tin, Scar and Ho-ching have changed their behavior and became more rule-abiding, hoping to complete their prison sentences soon. As the prison becomes more peaceful, Ho Chun, an entrepreneur who is accused for instigating crime, is remanded in prison for three months before his next hearing. Since Ho is used to being above others, he applies his business philosophy in prison and bribes Big Roller and Scar to be his followers while Ho himself becomes the big boss in prison. When Ho discovers a new witness who will testify against him which may result in a life sentence, and bribes Big Roller, Kin-tin, Scar and Ho-ching to help him breakout of prison and promises to arrange a getaway to Thailand. However, because they have changed their ways, the four of them refuse to help Ho so Ho resorts to blackmailing them and they are forced to oblige.

== Cast ==
- Patrick Tam as Lam Kwok-lung (林國龍), nicknamed Big Roller (滾筒), a ruthless triad leader who has been imprisoned for 20 years for manslaughter.
- Louis Cheung as Chan Ho-ching (陳浩正), a petty criminal who goes to prison as a means to ensure a living.
- Ron Ng as Ho Chun (賀俊), a young entrepreneur who is accused for instigating crime and remanded for further hearing, who bribes Big Roller, Ho-ching, Kin-tin, and Scar to help him breakout of prison.
- Justin Cheung as Scar (刀疤), Big Roller's former rival in prison who has settled their differences with one another.
- Adam Pak as Mak Kin-tin (麥建天), chief advisor of a construction company who was imprisoned after being framed by his partner for fraud.
- Kenny Wong as Warden Tang (鄧獄長), the prison superintendent.
- Terry Zou as Cheung Yuen (張源), Tang's subordinate and chief director of the prison.
- Tyson Chak as Chickenshit Keung (騰雞強), a prison guard.
- Stefan Wong as Chow Chi-wing (皺志榮), Kin-tin's partner who committed fraud and frames the former, but has now also landed himself in prison.
- Thor Lok as Ho Chi-wai (何志威), Tang and Cheung's subordinate and director of the prison.

=== Guest appearance ===
- Christine Ng as Mei-ling (美玲), Big Roller's ex-wife.
- Larine Tang
- Ben Yuen
- Joe Junior

== Release ==
Breakout Brothers 2 was originally set for theatrical release on 13 January 2022 in Hong Kong, but was pushed back to 28 April 2022 due to cinema closures amid the fifth wave of the COVID-19 pandemic in Hong Kong. The film retained its 13 January release date in Macau and Singapore.

== Reception ==
=== Box office ===
In Hong Kong, the film grossed HK$253,052 (US$32,249) during its first four days of release, debuting at No. 7 on its opening weekend. During its second weekend, the film grossed HK$159,153, coming in at No. 8, and have accumulated a total gross of HK$412,175 so far.

=== Critical reception ===
Gabriel Chong of MovieXclusive gave the film a score of 3/5, noting it as marginally better than its predecessor and praising the cast for carrying the film on its shoulders. On the other hand, Edmund Lee of the South China Morning Post gave the film a score of 2.5/5 stars and notes its story and jokes pale in comparison to its predecessor.
