= Sam Chan =

Hong Kong actor, director and producer

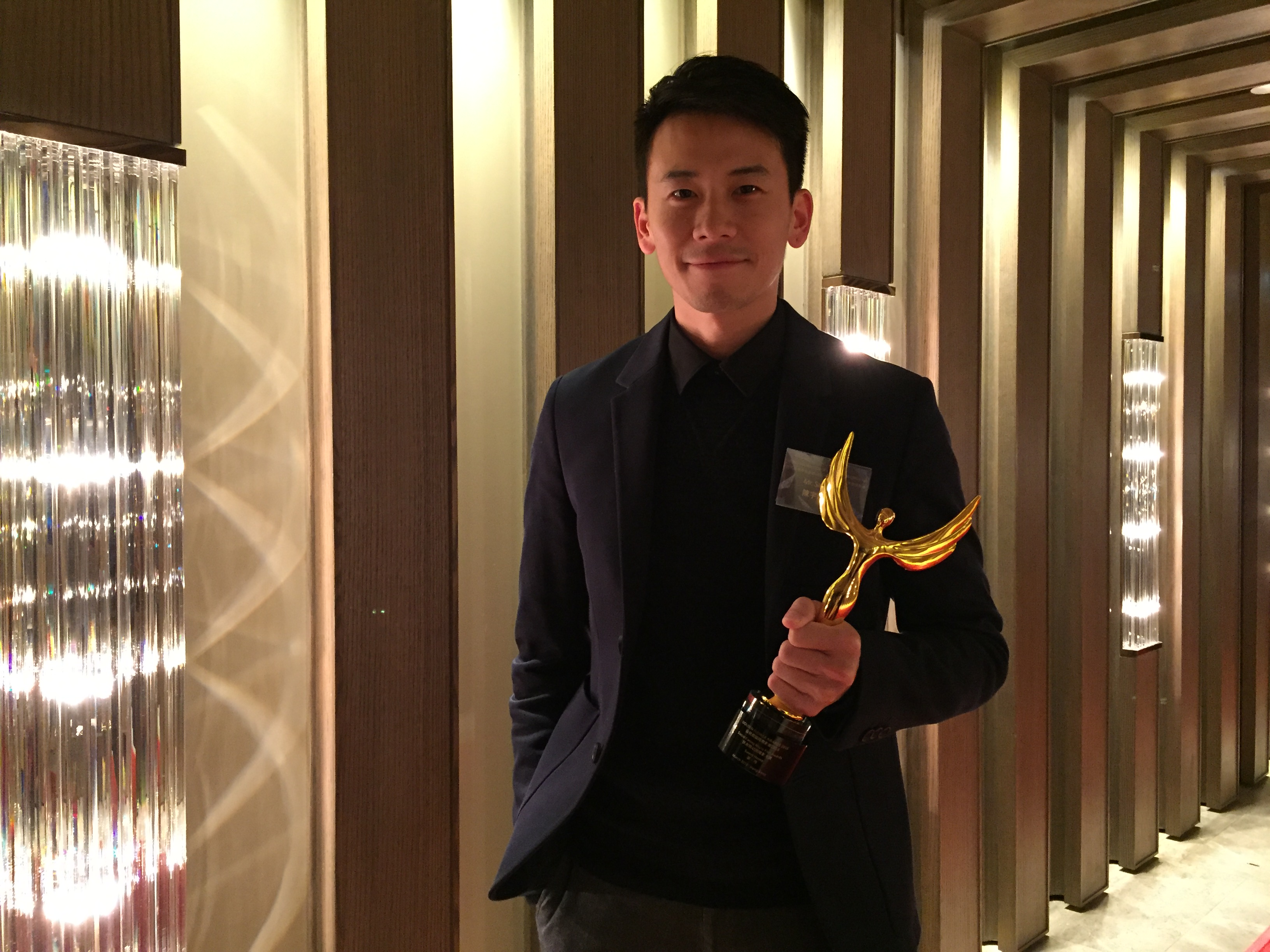
- Chan at the 2016 Golden Flower Awards Ceremony
- Born: 22 August 1979 (age 47); Hong Kong
- Occupations: Actor; director; designer; entrepreneur
- Years active: 2003–present
- Spouse: Camille Lam
- Parent(s): Maria Wong (Mother), Shek Sau (Father),

Chinese name
- Traditional Chinese: 陳宇琛
- Simplified Chinese: 陈宇琛
Transcriptions
Standard Mandarin
- Hanyu Pinyin: chen yucen
Yue: Cantonese
- Jyutping: can4 jyu5 sam1

Sam Chan Yu-sum (Chinese: 陳宇琛; born 22 August 1979) is a Hong Kong actor, director and producer. He made his acting career debut in TVB's Hearts of Fencing in 2003. His father, Shek Sau, is an iconic TV and film actor. In the past decade, he has expanded his career as a director and producer, establishing his own production company, A Rocking Production, in 2014. He is currently co-creating a lifestyle brand and YouTube channel with award-winning actress, Teresa Mo, and his wife Camille Adeline, a TV presenter and multimedia artist.

== Biography ==
Chan Yu Sum Sam was born in Hong Kong. He attended Diocesan Preparatory School. Upon his parents' decision to immigrate to Vancouver, British Columbia, Canada, he left Hong Kong at the age of 10. Returning to Hong Kong at 16, he completed his studies at Chinese International School. He was then admitted into Kingston University, in England, and inspired by of his uncle who is a structural engineer, he went on to study architecture, from which he graduated in 2002. It was during his time in England when he grew passionate of theatre and dramatic arts.

Besides his work as an actor, Sam Chan is a designer, director and entrepreneur, hoping to share his artistic background in all of his business ventures. He founded his jewelry brand LLazy Bonez Design in 2009, designing handcrafted pieces influenced by Neo-Gothic architecture. He is also the co-founder and Managing Director of A Rocking Production (陳宇琛工作室), an innovation and strategic consultancy specializing in marketing, short films and event management.

== Filmography ==
- Hearts of Fencing (2003)
- My Family (2005)
- Bizarre Files (2005)
- Healing Hands 3 (2005)
- The Price of Greed (2006)
- The Ultimate Crime Fighter (2007)
- The Building Blocks of Life (2008)
- The Seventh Day (2008)
- Burning Flame III (2009)
- Twilight Investigation (2010)
- Only You (2011)
- The Other Truth (2011)
- Tiger Cubs (2012)
- Incredible Mama (2015)
- IPCC Files 2015 (2015)
- P4B (2015)
- The Menu (2015)
- Hidden Faces (2015)
- S Storm (2016)
- Mysterious Fighter Project A (2018)
- Top Female Force (2019)
- We Are The Littles (2020)
