= Imprisoned: Survival Guide for Rich and Prodigal =

2015 Hong Kong film by Christopher Sun

- Theatrical poster
- Directed by: Christopher Sun
- Written by: Mark Woo Yiu-Fai; Nero Ng
- Produced by: Albert Lee Wing Ho
- Starring: Gregory Wong; Justin Cheung; Tommy Wong; Liu Kai-chi; Babyjohn Choi; Jessy Li
- Cinematography: Cheng Siu-keung
- Edited by: Alan Cheng
- Music by: Ryan Thomas; Raymond Wong; Wendy Zheng
- Production companies: China 3D Digital Entertainment; Sun Entertainment Culture
- Distributed by: Newport Entertainment
- Release date: 28 May 2015
- Running time: 108 minutes
- Country: Hong Kong
- Language: Cantonese
- Box office: HK$7.11 million

Imprisoned: Survival Guide for Rich and Prodigal, (Chinese: 壹獄壹世界: 高登闊少踎監日記) is a 2015 Hong Kong prison comedy film directed by Christopher Sun and starring Gregory Wong, Justin Cheung, Tommy Wong, Liu Kai-chi, Babyjohn Choi and Jessy Li. The film is based on an online novel published on HKGolden Forum. The film was released on 28 May 2015.

== Cast ==
- Gregory Wong
- Justin Cheung
- Tommy Wong
- Liu Kai-chi
- Babyjohn Choi
- Jessy Li
- Candice Yu
- Elvis Tsui
- Ken Lo
- Philip Keung
- Lam Suet
- Wan Yeung-ming
- Deon Cheung
- Hanjin Tan
- Anita Chui
- Coffee Lam
- Aaron Chow
- Jack Hui
- Raymond Chiu
- Yang Jianping
- Tony Ho

=== Guest stars ===
- Frankie Ng
- Yuen Qiu
- William Ho
- Joyce Cheng

== Box office ==
The film has grossed HK$3.12 million (US$403,000) on the first weekend. On the second weekend, the film has grossed HK$1.54 million (US$198,000) for a total of HK$5.99 million (US$772,000). On the third weekend, the film has grossed a total of HK$7.11 million (US$917,000).

It was 18th out of 59 locally produced and co-produced films in Hong Kong in 2015.
