= Kiss of a Butterfly =

- Directed by: Anton Sivers
- Written by: Arkadi Tigai
- Produced by: Valeriy Todorovsky; Dmitry Meskhiev; Svetlana Slityuk
- Starring: Sergey Bezrukov; Lan Yan; Andrei Astrakhantsev; Leonid Gromov; Anna Dubrovskaya
- Cinematography: Yuri Shaygardanov
- Music by: Svetoslav Kurashov
- Distributed by: Central Partnership
- Release date: 2006
- Running time: 105 min.
- Country: Russia
- Language: Russian

Kiss of a Butterfly (Russian: Поцелуй бабочки, romanized: Potseluy babochki) is a 2006 Russian crime action film directed by Anton Sivers. The world premiere of the film was held July 21, 2006.

== Synopsis ==
Mysterious Chinese woman Li suddenly invades the serene life of Nikolai Orlanov, a young and successful computer genius. Without remembering who she is and how she got to bed with him, Orlanov soon realizes that he fell for the bait of his own emotions. The connection with the girl not only overturns his entire life, but also puts her at risk. Criminal clients, the Triads, angered bosses and love ...

== Cast ==
- Sergey Bezrukov – Nikolai Orlanov
- Lan Yan – Li
- Andrei Astrakhantsev – Lavrik
- Leonid Gromov – The Marshal
- Anna Dubrovskaya – Anzhela
- Helga Filippova – Anya
- Laura Lauri – False-Li
- Georgi Pitskhelauri – Aleks
- Sergei Shekhovtsov – Kravtsov
- Konstantin Shelestun – Bobka
