= Witch Doctor (film) =

- Poster
- Chinese: 妖医
- Directed by: Wu Zongqiang
- Starring: Treechada Petcharat; Patrick Tam; Lu Yulai; Meng Yao
- Production companies: Beijing zhong shi mei xing international culture media Meixing (Tianjin) Entertainment; TianJin Coastal International Industry; Zhongying Cullture Corporation; Tianjin Wudu Shikong Consulting; Iqiyi Pictures; TianJin BeiFang Film Group; Dongyang Jiechengrui Jixiang Entertainment; Beijing Huangying Entertainment; TMRABILIS; Tianjin Huaweihu
- Distributed by: Iqiyi Pictures
- Release date: May 27, 2016 (China)
- Running time: 100 minutes
- Countries: China; Thailand
- Language: Mandarin
- Box office: CN¥5.4 million

Witch Doctor is a 2016 Chinese-Thai horror suspense thriller film directed by Wu Zongqiang and starring Treechada Petcharat, Patrick Tam, Lu Yulai and Meng Yao. It was released in China by Iqiyi Pictures on May 27, 2016.

== Plot ==
Xing Xiao, a charming Thai beauty, was separated from her twin sister Xing Hui when she was young. She and her boyfriend Sha Qing tried every possible means to find Xing Hui. During this process, Xing Xiao met Chen Yonglin. Curiosity and compassion made Chen Yonglin intervene in the lives of Sha Qing and Xing Xiao. When he fell in love with Xing Xiao, he found that it was just a puzzle with defenses everywhere and thrilling steps.

== Cast ==
- Treechada Petcharat
- Patrick Tam
- Lu Yulai
- Meng Yao
- Gao Yalin

Zhang Bu

== Reception ==
The film has grossed CN¥5.4 million at the Chinese box office.
