= Treechada Petcharat =

Thai transgender beauty queen

- ตรีชฎา หงษ์หยก
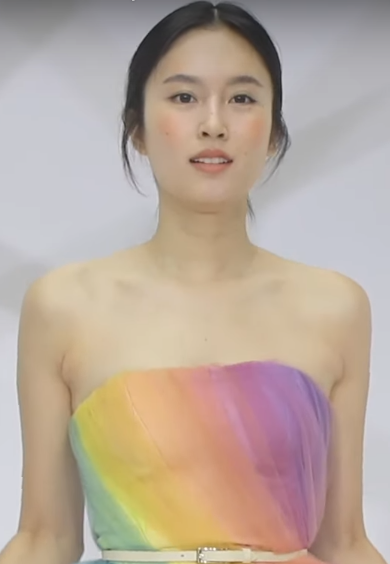
- Treechada at POEM Autumn-Winter 2019
- Born: Sakkanarin Malayaporn; 5 October 1986 (age 39); Phang Nga, Thailand
- Other names: Poyd; Nong Poy; Polly
- Education: Assumption University; Mahidol University
- Occupations: Actress; model
- Years active: 2004–present
- Title: Miss International Queen; Miss Tiffany's Universe
- Term: 2004–2005
- Spouse: Banlu Hongyok (m. 2023)
- Family: Surasak Malayaporn (father); Suwapat Petcharat (mother)

Treechada Petcharat (Thai: ตรีชฎา เพชรรัตน์, RTGS: Trichada Phetcharat), originally Treechada Malayaporn (Thai: ตรีชฎา มาลยาภรณ์, RTGS: Trichada Malayaphon) and better known by the nicknames Poyd (Thai: ปอย, RTGS: Poi) or Nong Poy (Thai: น้องปอย, RTGS: Nong Poi), is a Thai actress and model who underwent gender affirming surgery at age 17. She is dubbed Thailand's "most beautiful transgender woman".

== Life and career ==
Born into a Thai Chinese family, in childhood, Petcharat realized she was a transgender woman. In front of her parents, however, she had to hide her identity and was forced to present as male. She did not want her genitals, so at the age of 17, she underwent gender affirming surgery. Since then, she has said that she feels as if she has been reborn. She completed her studies in the Faculty of Law at Assumption University and is currently pursuing a degree in molecular genetics and genetic engineering at Mahidol University.

At age 19, Petcharat became Miss Tiffany's Universe and Miss International Queen of 2004, winning the latter's Best Swimwear award deservedly because her home province, Phang Nga, is known for its coastal landscapes.

She is an advocate for the LGBTQ+ community and openly shares her personal journey, including her surgery. In 2013, Petcharat actively participated in parliamentary discussions in Thailand, advocating for the legalization of same-sex marriage. Furthermore, she collaborated with fellow transgender celebrities in a Pantene advertisement, aiming to promote transgender visibility and raise awareness about the transgender community.

In addition to a successful modeling career, Petcharat has also appeared in several films over the years. In 2014, she starred in The White Storm a crime action film directed and produced by Benny Chan that focuses on a large-scale drug bust involving Hong Kong police and Thai mafia, with her playing the role of a Thai drug dealer. A year later, Petcharat took on the role of a mafia boss in the action comedy film From Vegas to Macau II, starring renowned Hong Kong actors Chow Yun-fat, Carina Lau and Shawn Yue.

Petcharat now serves as the managing director of Biomtpharma, her own laboratory and supplement manufacturing company.

== Personal life ==
On 1 March 2023, Petcharat married Banlu "Oak" Hongyok, a great-grandson of Tan Jin Nguan, a businessman of Chinese descent whose family has a longstanding connection to Phuket's tin industry. At their wedding ceremony in Phuket, Petcharat wore traditional Peranakan attire reportedly valued at US$580,000.

== Filmography ==
- With Love (2010)
- Spicy Beauty Queen of Bangkok 2 (2012)
- The White Storm (2013)
- From Vegas to Macau II (2015)
- Insomnia Lover (2016)
- Witch Doctor (2016)

== Television ==
Year	Title	Role
2017	Club Friday Season 9: Fake Love	Toi
2024	Tomorrow and I	Vee

Awards and achievements
Preceded by New Title	Miss International Queen; 2004	Succeeded by (United States) Mimi Marks
