= Justin Cheung =

Hong Kong actor (born 1983)

- 張建聲
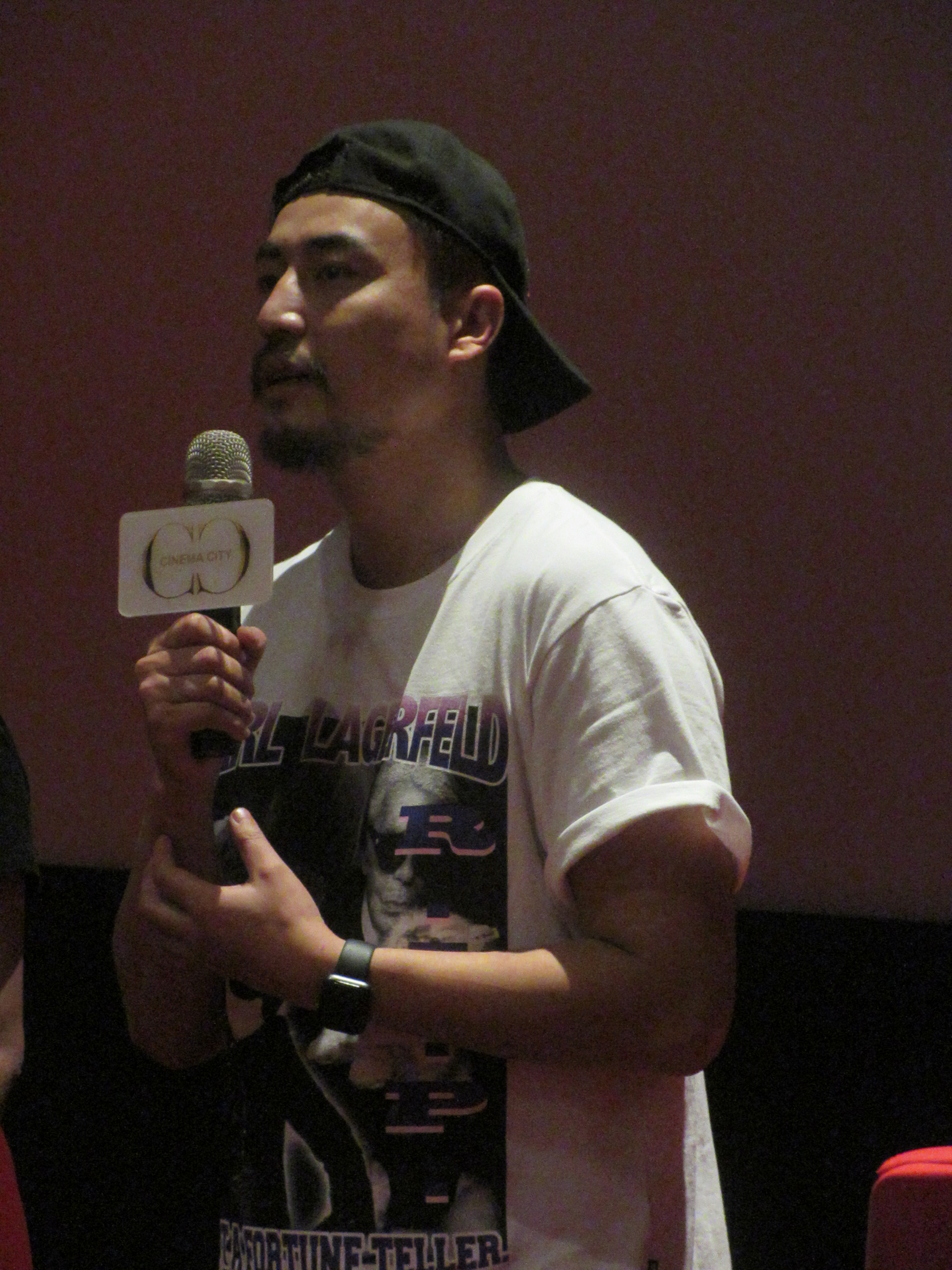
- Cheung in July 2019
- Born: Cheung Kin-sing; 11 March 1983 (age 43); Hong Kong
- Occupation: Actor
- Years active: 2010–present

Justin Cheung Kin-sing (Chinese: 張建聲; born 11 March 1983) is a Hong Kong actor. Starting his career in HMV-produced erotic films, Cheung gained recognition with his lead role as Frankie in the erotic black comedy film Due West: Our Sex Journey (2012). He then transitioned to different genres, starring in the crime film Imprisoned (2015) and the drama film The Menu (2016). Cheung achieved breakout success with the role Jiu Jik in the crime thriller series OCTB (2017). He continued to star in various productions, taking on lead roles in crime films Deception of the Novelist (2019) and the Breakout Brothers trilogy (2021–2022), as well as supporting lead roles in ViuTV action thriller series Warriors Within (2020) and action film Dynasty Warriors (2021). He is set to reprise as Jiu Jik in the upcoming OCTB 2.

== Early life ==
Cheung was born on 11 March 1983. Cheung's father works as a cross-border truck driver, and he grew up in a public housing estate. He attended S.K.H. Leung Kwai Yee Secondary School, but he did not perform well academically, and he described himself as deviant during his youth. At the age of 16, he started working as a janitor at a hotel in Central prior to graduation and only scored one mark in the Hong Kong Certificate of Education Examination. After completing secondary school, he worked in various roles such as a clerk, delivery man, salesman, and construction worker. When he turned 18, he developed an interest in artistic cycling and began filming his moves, which sparked his fascination with filmmaking. At the age of 25, Cheung went on a nine-month working holiday to Perth, Australia. During his time there, he worked on a farm, in a steel mill, and at a Chinese restaurant. He also entered into a relationship with a Chinese girlfriend and nearly got married, but ultimately ran away from the wedding and returned to Hong Kong.

== Career ==
Upon his return to Hong Kong, he did not find any job until his newfound girlfriend encouraged him to pursue a career in modeling. After two years as a model, Cheung aspired to become an actor and signed with Stephen Shiu Jr.'s artist agency, HMV Digital China. In the first year, he didn't receive any job offers except for one as a podcast host. However, he began receiving roles in erotic films in the following year. Cheung's breakout role came in 2012 when he landed the leading role of Frankie in the erotic film Due West: Our Sex Journey, which was adapted from the web novel Dongguan Wood. During the filming of Due West, director Mark Wu recommended that he try method acting, which became his acting style and ignited his passion for the craft. However, his fame also led to him being labeled as an erotic star, which resulted in him being rejected for several film roles due to the stereotype. As a result, he decided to switch genres and starred in another leading role in the 2013 romance film The Best Plan Is No Plan, alongside Sammy Sum and Hanjin Tan. In 2015, Cheung starred as Jack, the main villain and co-leading role, in the crime film Imprisoned: Survival Guide for Rich and Prodigal alongside Gregory Wong. He gained sixty pounds for the role, and took acting courses at a community centre to improve his skills. He also had a minor role in the comedy film Love Detective in the same year and landed another leading role as Chong Nga Yuen, a media tycoon, in the drama film The Menu the following year.

Cheung achieved breakthrough success with his portrayal of Jiu Jik, a maniac gangster, in the crime thriller web series OCTB. He immersed himself in the character through method acting, dying his hair and eyebrows white, and spending two months with real gangsters. He also drew inspiration from Heath Ledger's portrayal of Joker, considering his performance a tribute to the character. The show's popularity and Cheung's multi-layered and convincing performance earned him widespread acclaim, and he won Most Popular Character in a Web Series in the Yahoo! Asia Buzz Awards 2017. Ming Pao described his performance as "resounding" and lauded his acting skills, while Yahoo! News recognized his character as "the most eye-catching among characters of all kind in the series". Oriental Daily News reported that Jiu Jik had attracted numerous fans, with some even getting tattoos of his portrait. Following this breakthrough, Cheung began receiving more roles in various productions, including a lead role in the 2017 horror film Ghost Net, and supporting roles in the 2018 crime film Project Gutenberg, the 2018 business-themed mystery series The Trading Floor, and the 2019 crime film P Storm.

In 2019, Cheung made his producer debut and starred as Chui Chit, the male protagonist, in the mystery film Deception of the Novelist. The following year, he took on lead roles as Lau Ka Wah and Tanaka Kunizen in the ViuTV drama series Sorina Fok and the action series Warriors Within. He also played the lead role of Scar in the Breakout Brother trilogy from 2021 to 2022, and had supporting roles as Sung Ngo Yeung in the sports film One Second Champion, Zhang Fei in the action film Dynasty Warriors, and Tsang Chi Wai in the crime film The Attorney. Cheung established a toy brand called NiL and in 2022, he launched an NFT featuring a cartoon version of Jiu Jik. In 2023, Cheung appeared in lead roles in the horror film Shadows and the crime film Death Notice. He is set to reprise his role as Jiu Jik in the currently in-production sequel OCTB 2. Cheung dedicated about a year to undergo method acting and reconnect with Jiu Jik's personality and mindset before the start of filming in 2023.

== Personal life ==
Cheung dated actress Kelly Chen for three years, before the broke up in July 2019. Cheung announced his relationship with actress Angel Zeng on 25 December 2023. They had been dating for a year and a half after meeting each other during the filming of the 2021 film P.T.G.F., in which Cheung played the role of Zeng's father.

== Filmography ==
=== Film ===
Year	Title	Role	Notes
2011	The 33D Invader	Felix	
2011	3D Sex and Zen: Extreme Ecstasy	Mr. Lam	
2012	Due West: Our Sex Journey	Frankie	
2013	The Best Plan Is No Plan	Chan Wing Shing (陳永勝)	
2015	Imprisoned: Survival Guide for Rich and Prodigal	Jack Lui Man Chik (呂文積)	
2015	Love Detective	Mr. Doxing (起底生)	
2016	The Menu	Chong Nga-yuen (莊雅源)	
2017	Ghost Net	Sam	
2018	Agent Mr Chan	Cheung Yan (張仁)	
2018	Project Gutenberg	Shum Sei-hoi (沈四海)	
2019	P Storm	Nadal (拿度)	
2019	Deception of the Novelist	Chui Chit (徐哲)	Also as producer
2020	Breakout Brothers	Scar (刀疤)	
2021	One Second Champion	Sung Ngo Yeung (宋傲揚)	
2021	Dynasty Warriors	Zhang Fei	
2021	P.T.G.F	Albert	
2021	The Attorney	Tsang Chi Wai (曾志威)	
2022	Breakout Brothers 2	Scar	
2022	Breakout Brothers 3	Scar	
2023	Shadows	Chu Chun Yung (朱俊勇)	
2023	Death Notice	Suen Chun Fung (孫春豐)	
2024	The Prosecutor	Cheung Man-bing (張文炳)	Special appearance

=== Television ===
Year	Title	Role	Notes
2017	OCTB	Chiu "Jiu Jik" Chi-keung (招志強 / 招積)	Main role
2018	The War Net	Chan Chau (陳秋)	Television movie
2018	The Trading Floor	Leung Kai (梁佳)	Recurring role
2018	Hong Kong West Side Stories	Ha Ka Hing (夏家興)	Main role
2020	Sorina Fok	Andy Lau Ka Wah (劉家華)	Main role
2020	Warriors Within	Takeda Kunizen	Main role
2021	Generation Slash	Fong Chung Yin (方中言)	Recurring role
2022	The Parents League	Josh Lam Kin Sing (林健星)	Special appearance

== Awards and nominations ==
Year	Award	Category	Work	Result	Ref.
2017	Yahoo! Asia Buzz Awards 2017	Most Popular Character in a Web Series	OCTB	Won	
