= Insomnia Lover =

- Poster
- Chinese: 失眠男女
- Directed by: Yuan Jie
- Starring: Treechada Petcharat; Deng Zifeng; Patrick Tam; Lan Yan; Teddy Lin
- Production company: Shenzhen Haiyuan Mengxiang Media
- Distributed by: Beijing Lanjing Shengshi Media
- Release date: April 22, 2016
- Running time: 98 minutes
- Country: China
- Language: Mandarin
- Box office: CN¥2.2 million

Insomnia Lover is a 2016 Chinese romantic comedy film directed by Yuan Jie and starring Treechada Petcharat, Deng Zifeng, Patrick Tam, Lan Yan and Teddy Lin. It was produced by Shenzhen Haiyuan Mengxiang Media and distributed by Beijing Lanjing Shengshi Media which released it in China on April 22, 2016. The English title as given in the movie itself is Sleepless Men and Women. The beginning credits in the movie listed Poyd aka Treechada Petcharat, Deng Zifei, Yangliao, and Zhao Yixin as starring while Patrick Tam aka Tan Yaowen, Lanyan, and Teddy Lin aka Lianjin are listed under cameo appearance. The director Yuan Jie is credited as Jacky who is also the writer.

== Plot ==
An Ding, a freelance insomnia therapist meets a beautiful girl at a beach in Shenzhen. After finding out that she needs help in going to sleep, he makes her falls to sleep on her beach chair and sticks on her chest his business card sticker. In a nightclub he meets his goddess who disappears after he comes back from the toilet. That same woman goes to his clinic to seek treatment accompanied by her friend Xiao-chen and An Ding finds out her name is Miao Tiao. Miao Tiao works in an insurance firm. Later, in the same nightclub Miao Tiao and Xiao-chen are saved by An Ding and his friend Fei from two male patrons of the nightclub that are harassing them. Thus begins a one-sided love affair between An Ding and Miao Tiao. The movie ended happily with Miao Tiao finally accepting An Ding's love and reciprocates.

== Cast ==
Name	Role
Treechada Petcharat (credited as Poyd)	----- Miao Tiao
Deng Zifeng (credited as Deng Zifei)	----- An Ding
Patrick Tam (credited as Tan Yaowen)
Lan Yan (credited as Lanyan)
Teddy Lin (credited as Lianjin)
Kingdom Yuen (credited as Yuan Qiondan)
Zhao Yixin
Yang Liao (credited as Yangliao)
Wong Yat-fei (credited as Huang Yifei)
Guo Jinjie

== Reception ==
The film grossed CN¥2.2 million at the Chinese box office.
