= Death Notice (Zhou novel) =

2014 novel by Zhou Haohui

- Author: Zhou Haohui
- Translator: Zac Haluza (2018)
- Language: Chinese

Death Notice is a mystery/detective fiction novel and is the first novel in a trilogy of the same name by Chinese author Zhou Haohui. It was first published in 2014 by Beijing Times Chinese Press as 死亡通知单：暗黑者 (literally: Death Wish Notice: Pitch-Dark one) . It was translated into English by Zac Haluza and published in 2018 by Doubleday.

== Summary ==
Death Notice by Zhou Haohui is a detective thriller and deadly game of cat-and-mouse, where a special police task force named the 418 hunts a deadly mastermind out to publicly execute criminals the law has been unable to reach. "Death Notice is the first volume in a trilogy, the beginning of a manhunt for a serial killer with a serious agenda, rather than a conclusive one. The case is such an involuted one that the book nevertheless is packed (over)full with crimes, revelations, and connections -- and it works reasonably well as a first, separate stage of a larger story." The novel starts with an ominous letter and the death of an iconic sergeant on the police force. "When Sergeant Zheng Haoming is found dead in his apartment, Captain Han Hao is determined to catch the culprit. The sergeant was a living legend and beloved mentor to scores of police officers—this crime hits especially hard." "The murder of the legendary Sgt. Zheng Haoming of the Chengdu Criminal Police reopens an 18-year-old investigation and resurrects a number of ghosts. First on the scene of Zheng’s murder is Capt. Pei Tao of the provincial Longzhou Police Department, who had an appointment with Zheng. Pei and Zheng have a history that goes back to the police academy and a crime committed long ago by “Eumenides,” a self-styled avenger, and together they had been investigating the possibility that Eumenides has resurfaced. In Greek mythology, Eumenides were the Furies, three goddesses of revenge; and Eumenides is back, as several victims receive a “death notice” listing the nature of their crimes and the day of their execution. All are guilty of crimes that either were not, or could not be, punished by conventional justice, and Pei and the Chengdu police attempt to both avert the fatal punishments and unmask and apprehend Eumenides."

== Cast of characters ==
The 4/18 Task Force

Captain Han Hao-Chengdu Criminal Police, leader of the reinstated 4/18 team

Officer Yin Jian-Assistant to Captain Han

Captain Luo Fei -Longzhou Criminal Police

Captain Xiong Yuan-Chengdu Special Police Unit

Officer Liu Song-Chengdu SPU

Mu Jianyun-Psychologist, lecturer at the Sichuan Police Academy

Officer Zeng Rihua-Chendu Criminal Police, supervisor of digital surveillance

Sergeant Zheng Haoming-Chengdu Criminal Police, member of the original 1948 4/18 taskforce

== Adaptations ==
- Death Notify, 2014 Chinese web series
- Death Notice, 2022 Hong Kong film directed by Herman Yau
