= Kate Yeung =

Hong Kong actress and singer (born 1984)

- Chinese: 楊淇
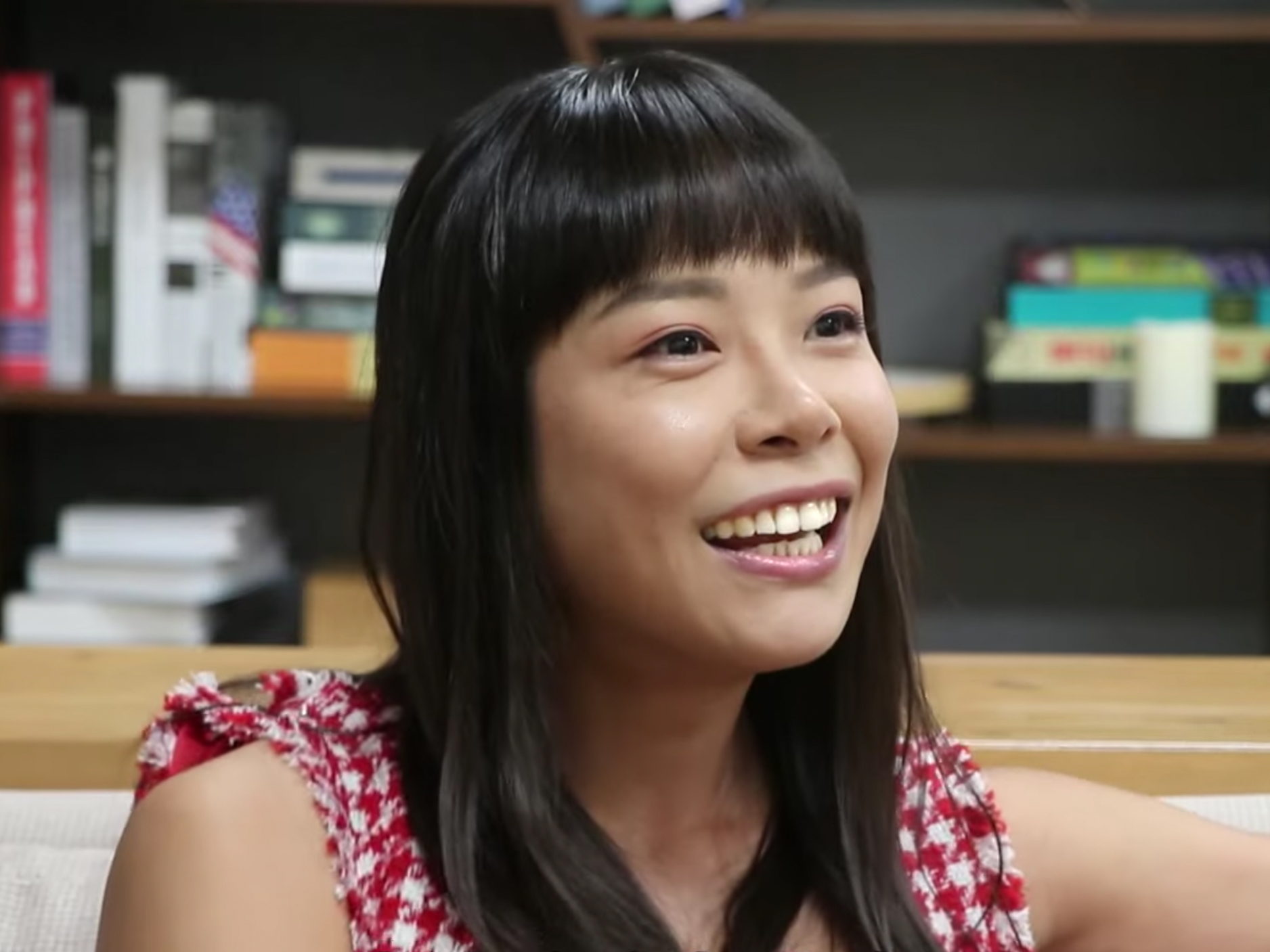
- Yeung in 2021
- Born: Yeung Mei-ling Chinese: 楊美玲; October 26, 1984 (age 41); Hong Kong
- Occupation: Actress
- Years active: 2000–present

Kate Yeung (Chinese: 楊淇) is a Hong Kong actress and singer. She was nominated twice for Best Supporting Actress for 20 30 40.

== Early life ==
On 26 October 1984, Yeung was born as Yeung Mei-ling in Hong Kong.

== Career ==
At 16, Yeung modeled for Wing Shya, a celebrity photographer. In 2002, Yeung's film career started with Mighty Baby, a comedy film directed by Patrick Leung.

== Filmography ==
=== Film ===
Film
Year	English title	Chinese title	Role	Notes/Ref.
2002	Mighty Baby	絕世好B	Lin Lin	
2002	Demi-Haunted	魂魄唔齊	Miko	Nominated – Hong Kong Film Award for Best New Performer
2004	20 30 40		Tong Yi	Nominated – Hong Kong Film Award for Best Supporting Actress; Nominated – Golden Horse Award for Best Supporting Actress
2005	The Eye 10	見鬼10	May	
2006	Eternal Summer	盛夏光年	Hui Chia	
2007	It's a Wonderful Life	心想事成	Ding Fong	
2007	Magic Boy	魔術男	Wing	
2008	Coffee or Tea	咖啡，或茶	Hiu Wah	
2010	Hot Summer Days	全城熱戀熱辣辣	TV reporter	
2010	We Might As Well Be Strangers	偏偏		Short film
2010	Quattro Hong Kong	香港四重奏		Short film
2011	Happily Ever After	幸褔的旁邊	Yeung Mei-ling	TV movie
2011	Love in Space	全球熱戀	Lily	Cantonese voice
2013	Christmas Rose	聖誕玫瑰	Chan Fong-wah	
2015	First of May	五月一號	Kiki	
2016	The Menu	導火新聞線	Mallory Mak	
2018	Agent Mr. Chan			

=== Television series ===
Year	English title	Chinese title	Role	Notes
2010	SFC in Action	證義搜查線		
2015	Once Upon a Song	童話戀曲201314	Jade	
2015	The Menu	導火新聞線	Mallory Mak	
2015	Hidden Faces	三面形醫	Amber Yan / Jodie Yan	
2016	3X1	三一如三	Jenny Chan	
2019	The Republic			
