= Patrick Tam (actor) =

Hong Kong actor and singer

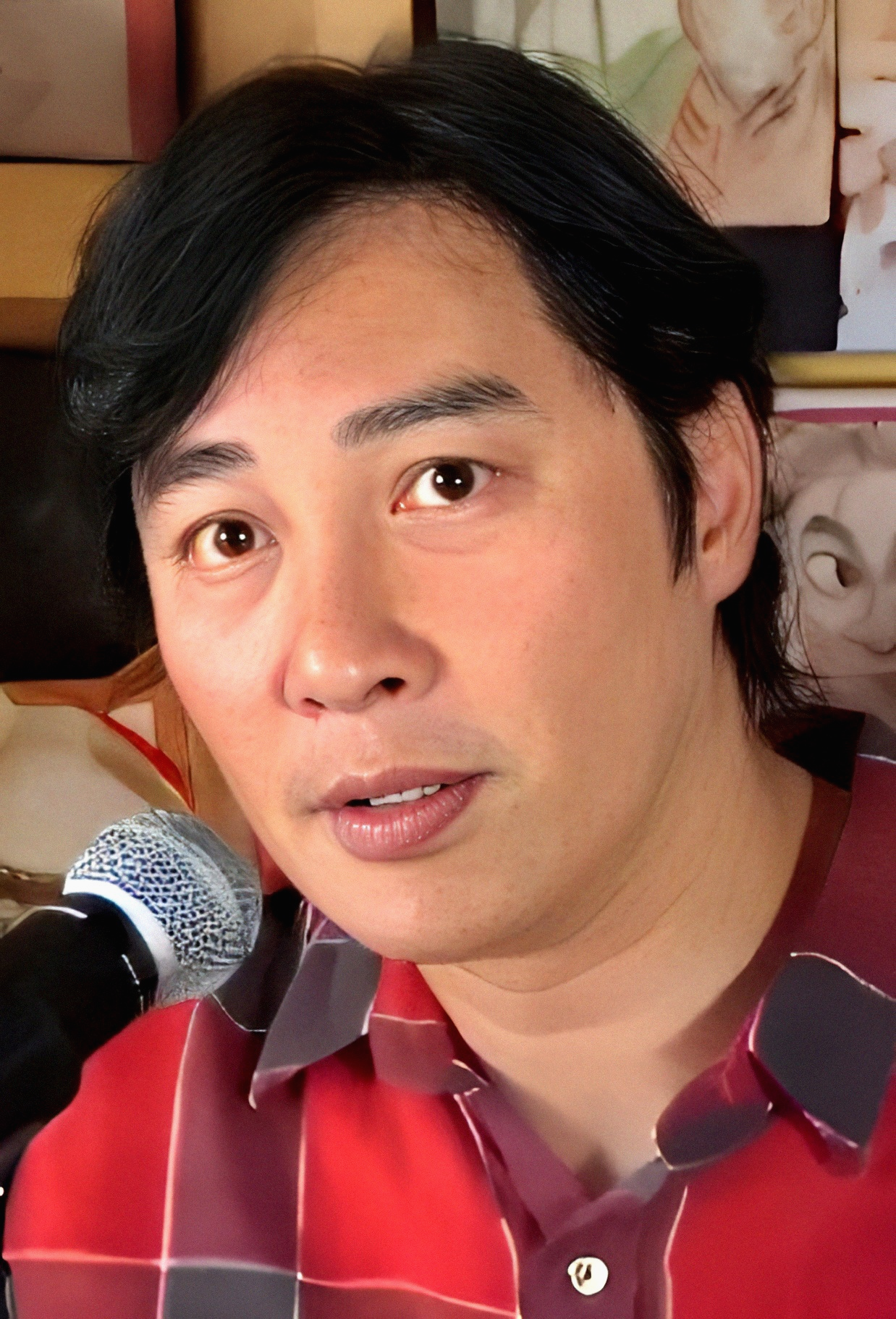
- Tam singing his representative song "Night of Blues" to encourage healthcare professionals in April 2020
- Born: British Hong Kong
- Occupations: Actor, Singer
- Years active: 1988—present
- Spouse: Fiona Chan (m. 2003)
- Children: 2

Chinese name
- Traditional Chinese: 譚耀文
- Simplified Chinese: 谭耀文
Transcriptions
Standard Mandarin
- Hanyu Pinyin: Tán Yàowén

Patrick Tam (Chinese: 譚耀文) is a Hong Kong actor and singer.

== Career ==
He first set foot into the entertainment industry after winning the 1988 New Talent Awards in Hong Kong alongside another notable Hong Kong singer, Sammi Cheng who was second runner-up.

After an unsuccessful stint in the music industry, Patrick was about to give up a career in the entertainment industry when he was approached by a TVB representative thus embarking on a journey into the world of acting.

He got his first break when he received the Best Supporting Actor award at the 18th annual Hong Kong Film Awards in 1999 for his role as Push Pin in Beast Cops.

His next notable achievement was a Best Supporting Actor award at the Taipei Golden Horse Film Festival for his role as Man in Born Wild in 2001.

== Personal life ==
In 1996, Patrick met and eventually dated fellow TVB colleague, actress Astrid Chan before separating over personality differences. In 2003, he married Fiona Chan on Christmas Eve which also happens to be her birthday.

On December 18, 2006, Patrick and Fiona welcomed son, Daniel (譚皓哲) Tam to the family.

On February 21, 2011, Patrick announced the birth of his second child Tamia (譚津如) Tam, with wife Fiona.

== Filmography ==
=== Films ===
- Finch & Midland (2025)
- Cyber Heist (2023)
- Where the Wind Blows (2023)
- Breakout Brothers 3 (2022)
- Breakout Brothers 2 (2022)
- Raging Fire (2021)
- Breakout Brothers (2020)
- A Witness Out of the Blue (2019)
- Fatal Visit (2019)
- First Class Charge (2019)
- P Storm (2019)
- The Fatal Raid (2018)
- The Choice (2018)
- Master Z: The Ip Man Legacy (2018)
- L Storm (2018)
- Dealer/Healer (2017)
- Kick Ball (2017)
- Witch Doctor (2016)
- Insomnia Lover (2016)
- Love in Late Autumn (2016)
- Ip Man 3 (2015)
- The Spirit of the Swords (2015)
- Wong Ka-Yan (2015)
- The Merger (2015)
- Port of Call (2015)
- Two Thumbs Up (2015)
- A Happy Life天天有喜(2014)
- Just Another Margin (2014)
- As the Light Goes Out (2014)
- Fiery Thunderbolt Qin Ming (2013)
- The House (2013)
- Triad (2012)
- Death Zone (2012)
- A Land without Boundaries (2011)
- The Detective 2 (2011)
- I Love Hong Kong (2011)
- Just Another Pandora's Box (2010)
- Here Comes Fortune (2010)
- To Live and Die in Mongkok (2009)
- The Storm Warriors (2009)
- Lady Cop & Papa Crook (2009)
- Mr. Right (2008)
- Trivial Matters (2007)
- In Love with the Dead (2007)
- Naraka 19 (2007)
- Simply Actors (2007)
- Luxury Fantasy (2007)
- Eastern Legend (2007)
- Who's Next (2007)
- A Chinese Tall Story (2005)
- The Myth (2005)
- City of SARS (2003)
- The Story of Long (2003)
- My Troublesome Buddy (2003)
- The New Option (2002)
- The Wall (2002)
- Body Puzzle (2002)
- La Brassiere (2001) [cameo]
- The Legend of Zu (2001)
- Born Wild (2001)
- Comeuppance (2000)
- Crying Heart (2000)
- Killers from Beijing (2000)
- Homicidal Maniac (2000)
- The Duel (2000)
- The Legend of Speed (1999)
- Purple Storm (1999)
- My Loving Trouble 7 (1999)
- Century of the Dragon (1999)
- Love in the River (1998)
- Operation Billionaires (1998)
- Beast Cops (1998)
- Point of No Return (1990)

=== TV series ===
Year	Title	Role
1994	The Swordsman Lai Bo Yee	Lai Bo Yee
1994	File Of Justice III	John
1995	File of Justice IV	Chris Yau Wing Hong
1997	File of Justice V	Chris Yau Wing Hong
2000	The Duke of Mount Deer (2000 TV series)	Kangxi Emperor
2003	Seed of Hope	Nicholas Woo
2004	Split Second	Yeung Kai Tung
2004	Angels of Mission	Lee Kin Keung
2006	Relentless Justice	Chin Tsz Kong
2010	The Holy Pearl	Rong Di Huang
2011	The Emperor's Harem	Wang Zhi
2012	Liu Hai Plays with Gold Toad	
2013	Earth God and Earth Grandmother	Zhang Fu De
2013	A Happy Life	Jin Buhuan

Preceded by Hui Hong Fong 方曉紅	New Talent Singing Awards winner 1988	Succeeded by Mei Kwan Tong 湯美君
