= Gregory Wong =

Hong Kong actor

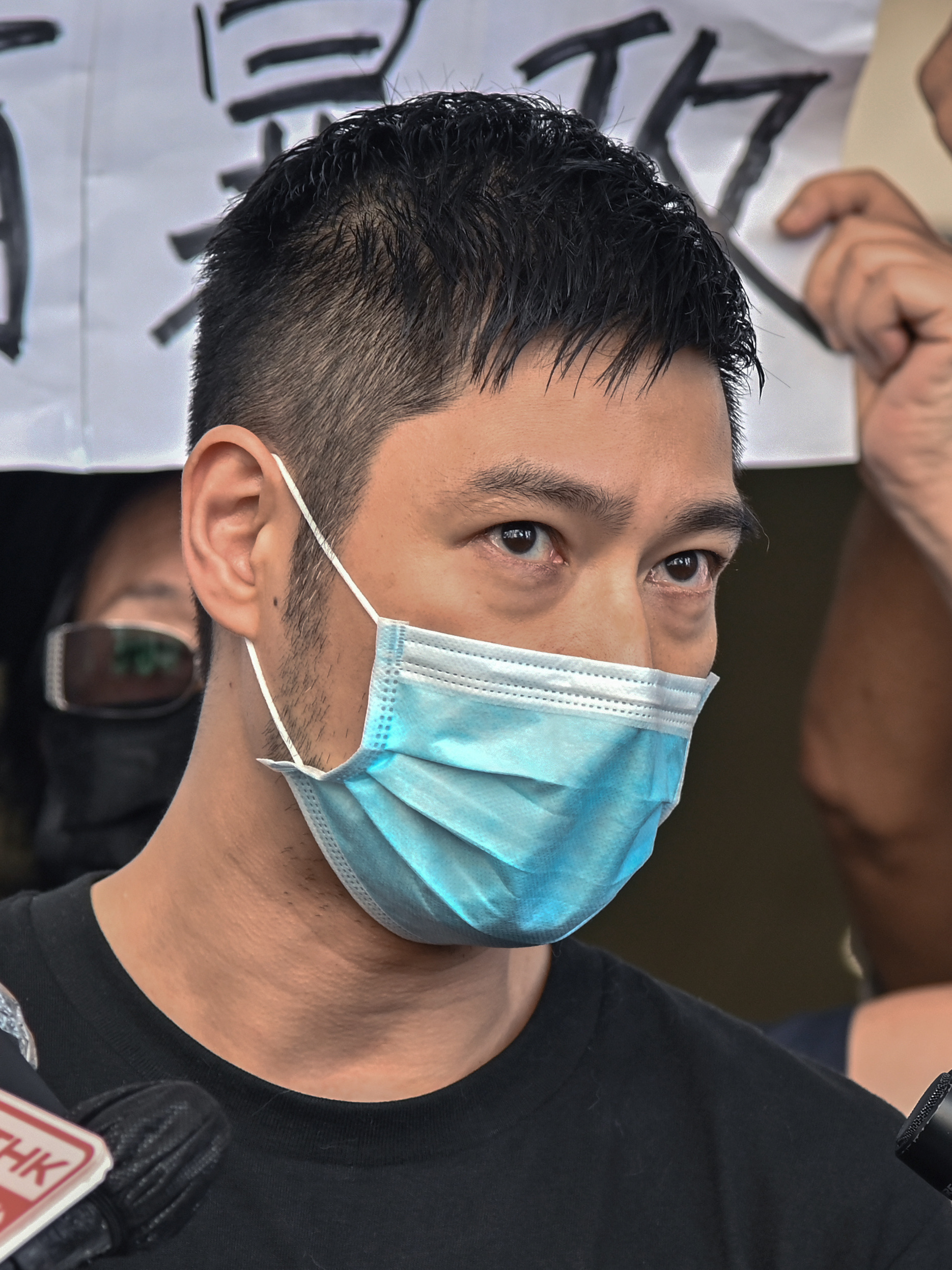
- Wong in June 2020
- Born: 2 October 1978 (age 48); Hong Kong
- Education: University College London (BSc); Ying Wa College; Imperial College London; University College London
- Occupation: Actor
- Years active: 2003–present

Chinese name
- Traditional Chinese: 王宗堯
- Simplified Chinese: 王宗尧
Transcriptions
Standard Mandarin
- Hanyu Pinyin: Wáng Zōngyáo
Yue: Cantonese
- Jyutping: wong4 zung1 jiu4
- Musical career
- Also known as: Wong Chung-yiu

Gregory Wong Chung-yiu (Chinese: 王宗堯; born 2 October 1978) is a Hong Kong actor. His notable roles include Lan Kwai Fong (2011), The Election (2014), and The Menu (2015).

On 29 April 2015, Wong renewed his contract with China 3D Digital Entertainment for another 5 years.

== Education ==
At the age of 14, Wong left Ying Wa College in New Kowloon for Britain to study at a boarding school. He returned to Hong Kong after graduating from the University College London at the age of 23.

== Conviction ==
Wong supported the pro-democratic movement during the 2019–20 Hong Kong protests. He was arrested and subsequently convicted in October 2019 in relation to the Storming of the Legislative Council Complex on 1 July 2019.

In March 2024, Gregory was sentenced to jail for six years and two months after pleading not guilty for rioting.

== Filmography ==
=== Films ===
Film
Year	English title	Chinese title	Role	Notes/Ref.
2006	Do Over	一年之初		
2007	Shanghai Baby	上海寶貝		
2008	Nirvana	百獄		Short film
2010	Love in a Puff	志明與春嬌	Cop in alley	
2010	Beauty on Duty!	美麗密令	Dragon	
2011	Hi, Fidelity	出軌的女人	Nakata	
2011	Lan Kwai Fong	喜愛夜蒲	Sean	
2012	Lan Kwai Fong 2	喜愛夜蒲2	Sean	Guest star
2012	Due West: Our Sex Journey	一路向西	Wong Jing	
2014	Lan Kwai Fong 3	喜愛夜蒲3	Sean	Guest star
2014	The Cabin in the Mountains	林中小屋	Jian Ming	
2014	Black Comedy	黑色喜劇	Ben Chik	
2014	Iceman	冰封俠: 重生之門	Officer Szeto	
2015		激戰獅子山		YouTube Short film
2015	Imprisoned: Survival Guide for Rich and Prodigal	壹獄壹世界：高登闊少踎監日記		
2015	Lazy Hazy Crazy	同班同學		
2016	The Mobfathers	選老坐	Wulf	
2016	The Menu	導火新聞線	Lok Ka-fai	
2019	Deception of the Novelist			

=== Television ===
Year	English title	Original title	Role	Notes/Ref.
2003	The Original Scent of Summer	原味的夏天		
2005	Wind Warrior	風中戰士	Yang Mufeng	
2008	Sakura Love	花之戀		
2009	Harukanaru Kizuna	遙かなる絆		
2010	Who's the Hero	勝者為王	Jack	
2011	Dropping by Cloud Nine	你們我們他們	Michael	
2011	Xiao Zi Zhen Suo	孝子診所		
2012	Strangers 6		secretary Wong	
2013	Girls Apartment	女生公寓	Gregory	
2013	Red Dust	滾滾紅塵	Xiao Bao	
2014-15	The Election	選戰	Cheung Gwai-lung	
2015	The Menu	導火新聞線	Lok Ka-fai	
2015	Doom +5	末日+5	Cheung Tsz-lok	Episode 5
2015	Night Shift	夜班	guy at the bar	Episode 6
2015	Elite Brigade III	火速救兵III	Choi Chi-chung	
2016	Margaret & David - Green Bean	瑪嘉烈與大衛系列 綠豆		
2017		申訴 II		
2017	3 Haters	賤民20		
2018	Hong Kong West Side Stories			
2018	Plan B			
