= The Menu (2016 film) =

2016 Hong Kong film by Ben Fong

- Film poster
- Traditional Chinese: 導火新聞線
- Simplified Chinese: 导火新闻线
- Hanyu Pinyin: Dǎo Huǒ Xīn Wén Xiàn
- Jyutping: Dou6 Fo2 San1 Man4 Sin3
- Directed by: Ben Fong
- Written by: Pun Man-hung; Chiu Mei-yee; Anson Wong; Cola Ho
- Produced by: Pun Man-hung; Xian Guohua; Song Jia; Wang Ren; Albert Lee
- Starring: Catherine Chau; Gregory Wong; Ng Man-tat; Kate Yeung
- Cinematography: Alpheus Woo
- Edited by: Wong Yuk-ming
- Music by: Kong Fai
- Production companies: China 3D Digital Entertainment iQiyi Motion Pictures; Beijing Yuanshi Media; YL Pictures; Jebsen Century Cultural Industry
- Distributed by: Gala Film Distribution
- Release date: 4 August 2016
- Running time: 90 minutes
- Country: Hong Kong
- Languages: Cantonese; Mandarin

The Menu (Chinese: 導火新聞線) is a 2016 Hong Kong drama film about journalism and the sequel to the television series of the same name. The film is directed by Ben Fong, who also directed the television series, and stars Catherine Chau, Gregory Wong, Ng Man-tat and Kate Yeung. The film was released on 4 August 2016.

== Plot ==
The invention of smart phones has accelerated the decline in print journalism, which online journalism has been replacing. Two years after the death of Kenny Wong and the departure of editor-in-chief Alma Wong, Smart Post is facing a direct challenge from Flash Post, whose online articles receive considerable click rate on its first date of publication. Fong Ying (Catherine Chau), Smart Post's interim editor-in-chief, is warned by CEO Chong Nga-yuen (Justin Cheung) that the newspaper will be forced to shut down if it loses in the competition with Flash Post. On her first day as photojournalist, Mallory Mak (Kate Yeung) comes across the award-winning photo "The Starving of Sudan" and discusses the ethics behind photojournalism with her colleague and boyfriend Lok Ka-fai (Gregory Wong).

Young entrepreneur Ko Yin-yan is interviewed at the television station C99. Seven years ago, he raped and murdered a 17-year-old girl but was acquitted of all charges after he bribed a key witness. Although the witness admitted to giving false testimony later, Ko was unable to be charged again owing to the principle of "double jeopardy", which forbids the prosecution to press the same charge against the same person again. Furious at seeing the murderer of her daughter remain at large, Tam Yui-chi (Ng Man-tat) has long been under hunger strikes protesting the government's slow progress in abolishing double jeopardy despite professional recommendations, but his solo actions have been constantly ignored and at one point mocked by Lok, who told him he can never gain any media attention unless he has a mass support group or he commits a crime. Seeing Ko's visit to the television studio as a chance, Tam, a technician at C99, detonates explosives and takes Ko hostage along with several colleagues of his. Tam demands the Chief Executive, Lo Kin-kuen, to meet with him before midnight, otherwise he will kill all the hostages and himself. He then sends a voice message to his wife Chim Sui-wah (Mimi Kung) informing her of his action, which triggers her cardiac attack and causes her minibus to crash at a high speed.

Mak and Lok witness Chim's accident along with many journalists near the scene. Although Lok acts fast to discover Chim's mobile phone and to establish her relation with the hostage-taker, Flash Post overtakes Smart Post in sending the push notification of the breaking news. Fong decides to gain back click rate by asking Lok to break into the studio and to conduct a live online interview with Tam via a handheld transceiver. After Tam discloses the story of her daughter to the public, the interview is cut short by the police. Flash Post's Fung (Ben Yeung) and Zhong Kaiqi (Jeana Ho) follow suit but intentionally provoke Tam to make him assault Ko while broadcast live.

Lok traces the threatening messages in Chim's phone to Ko's father, a Guangzhou tycoon with a close relation with Lo, whom he confronts in person. Blaming himself for instigating Tam's action, he questions Fong's order to publish online the secretly-filmed video and instead takes it to the government Information Coordinator (Deon Cheung) to demand Lo's immediate intervention. Lo initially refuses, but agrees to send a delegate to negotiate after Fong reveals Ko's uncle is the legislator delaying the law reform regarding double jeopardy.

The preliminary talk between Tam and Lok as Lo's delegate goes well, and Tam releases four of the hostages. However, after seeing the photos of his wife's corpse published by Flash Post, a desperate Tam cuts the connection with the police and sets off one of the explosives, killing a hostage. Amidst a public uproar against Flash Post, Zhong resigns from the newspaper and Fong vows to take photojournalism back to the right cause. Smart Post's infographic video goes viral on social media and online forums, and attracts thousands to flood into the streets outside C99 station. Twenty minutes before the deadline, knowing about the mass of people gathering outside in support of him, Tam surrenders to the police.

Although Smart Post loses in terms of click rates by a narrow margin to Flash Post, whose editor-in-chief has just resigned, Fong is indifferent to this but summarises journalists' attitude with Kevin Kelly's message on the Whole Earth Catalog: "Stay hungry. Stay Foolish."

== Cast ==
- Catherine Chau as Fong Ying, interim editor-in-chief for Smart Post
- Gregory Wong as Lok Ka-fai, news editor for Smart Post
- Ng Man-tat as Tam Yui-chi, technician at C99, father of a rape-murder case victim
- Kate Yeung as Mallory Mak, photojournalist for Smart Post
- Akina Fong as Lee Sze-sze, news anchor for C99
- Justin Cheung as Chong Nga-yuen, chief executive officer of Kechun Media Ltd, Smart Post's parent company
- Ben Yeung as Yeung Ho-fung, senior reporter
- Jeana Ho as Zhong Kaiqi, university student working as an intern for Flash Post
- Kwok Fung as Kwan Chi-wai, president of Smart Post
- Mimi Kung as Chim Shui-wah, minibus driver, Tam Yui-chi's wife
- Lee Fung as Ho Lai-wan, Smart Post
- Benji Chiang as Kenny Wong
- Anita Chan as Emily Yuen, Smart Post
- Dexter Young as Mok Wun-choi, Smart Post
- Wen Chao as Fong Kai-chung, Smart Post reporter
- Deon Cheung as Gordon Tong, government Information Coordinator
- Cherry Pau as Winnie Chau, Smart Post
- Lydia Tong as Lam Piu-sa, Smart Post reporter
- Jacquelin Chong as Leung Ching-man, police negotiator
- Josephine Yu as Su Yunling, editor-in-chief for Flash Post
- Li Ming-ming as Ko Kin-yan
- Michael Lee as Ko Yiu-kau, Ko's father
- Tony Ho as Chung Pui-ho, member of the LegCo

== Production ==
Filming started on 1 December 2015.
