= 3X1 =

- Title card
- 三一如三
- Genre: Drama
- Written by: Wong Chi Yeung, Oliver Chan, Law Hoi Yi, Shek Chun Kit, Lai Man Wa
- Story by: Southern Dance Hall
- Directed by: Chan Chi Fat, Fan Wing Sang
- Starring: Brian Chan, Kate Yeung, Neo Yau Hawk-Sau, Christian Yang, Irene Wan, Gladys Li
- Country of origin: Hong Kong
- Original language: Cantonese
- No. of episodes: 56

Production
- Running time: around 30minutes/ episode

Original release
- Network: ViuTV
- Release: 25 July 2016 – 31 January 2017

3X1 (Chinese: 三一如三) is a Hong Kong television drama series produced by HK Television Entertainment, and broadcast by ViuTV.

The series is the second self-made drama series to be aired on ViuTV, and it premiered on 25 July 2016.

== Synopsis ==
The story is set in a Hong Kong that is facing a worsening economic climate, and it revolves around a retail space that is leased to three businesses, each operating during a different time of the day.

The businesses include:

- GOGOGO YOGA: a business that offers Yoga courses and personal training. It operates from 7 to 11AM
- Party of Two (Chinese: 二人前): a restaurant that offers pay what you want pricing until Episode 28. It operates from noon to 10PM
- Vincent Cafe: a coffee shop that offers live music. It operates from midnight to 5AM.

Each episode deals exclusively with one of the three businesses, with limited crossover between the characters.

== Cast members ==
=== GOGOGO YOGA ===
- King (Portrayed by Brian Chan): Co-owner and personal trainer. He is Jenny Chan's boyfriend.
- Jenny Chan (陳珍妮, portrayed by Kate Yeung): Co-owner, and a Yoga instructor. He is King's girlfriend.

=== Party of Two ===
- Mok Chee Fan (莫志凡, portrayed by Neo Yau Hawk-Sau): The restaurant's co-owner.
- Christian Yang (楊拓也, portrayed by Christian Yang): The restaurant's interim chef. Once worked for Michelin-starred eateries. The actor who portrays this character is a real life chef.
- Chan Yook Ping (陳旭平): The restaurant's co-owner, returned from overseas on the 28th episode.

=== Vincent Cafe ===
- Wong Mei Ling (黃美玲, portrayed by Irene Wan in the present day, and by Scarlett Wong in flashbacks): The cafe's owner. She was once an agent for musicians.
- Fah (花, portrayed by Gladys Li), a worker at Vincent Cafe, and its live singer. Her mother is Wong Mei Ling.

=== Other cast members ===
- Yuki (Portrayed by Hey Rachel): Fah's good friend. She died before a song she created was to be featured in a movie. The actress who portrays this character is a real life musician.
- Wilson (Portrayed by Law Wing-cheung): A movie producer who decided to cut Yuki's song from his movie. He eventually changed his mind, on the condition that Fah sings the song as a duet.
- Bondy Chiu: A frequent customer of Vincent Cafe. Chiu portrays herself in the series.
