= Rachel Lam =

Hong Kong model, actress, presenter and screenwriter

- 林熹瞳
- 2026
- Born: British Hong Kong
- Other name: Chan Hiu-wah (陳曉華)
- Education: The Hong Kong Academy for Performing Arts – Major in Acting
- Occupations: Model; actor; screenwriter; television presenter
- Years active: 2002–present

Rachel Lam (Chinese: 林熹瞳) is a Hong Kong model, actress, presenter and screenwriter. She wrote and co-starred in The Merger (2015) where the film garnered 27 awards in numerous film festivals.

In 2015, Lam and Tony Wong established their own film company Global Saga.

== Education ==
In 2006, Lam graduated from The Hong Kong Academy for Performing Arts with a major in acting.

== Filmography ==
=== Television ===
Year	English title	Original title	Role	Notes/Ref.
2015	SFC 3	證義搜查線3		Episode 2
2024	Darkside of the Moon	黑色月光		
2025	DID.12	刑偵12		
