= Zuki Lee =

Hong Kong actress (born 1977)

- 李思蓓
- Born: September 26, 1977 (age 48); British Hong Kong
- Education: TVB's acting classes
- Occupation: Actress
- Years active: 1995–present
- Agent: Wang Ziqi Studio

Chinese name
- Chinese: 李思蓓
Transcriptions
Standard Mandarin
- Hanyu Pinyin: Lī Sībèi
Yue: Cantonese
- Yale Romanization: Léih Sīpúih
- Jyutping: Lei5 Si1pui5

Zuki Lee (Chinese: 李思蓓; born 26 September 1977) is a Hong Kong actress.

Lee is noted for her roles as Qian Meimei and Shu Qing in the television series Flaming Butterfly (2007) and Mr. and Mrs. Gambler (2012) respectively.

== Life ==
Lee was born and raised in Hong Kong. She enrolled at the TVB's acting classes (無線電視藝員進修班), where she studied alongside Damon Law Kwun Fung, Lo Hing-Fai Marco, and LuLu Kai.

In 2012, Lee signed with Wang Ziqi Studio (汪子琦工作室).

== Personal life ==
Lee dated Eric Li when she studied at TVB's acting classes.

== Filmography ==
=== Film ===
Year	English title	Chinese title	Role	Notes/Ref.
1998	PR Girls	青春援助交際		
1999	The House of No Man	摩登姑婆屋		
1999	Unexpectable Killing	殺手風雲之買大開細		
2000	Sexy and Dangerous II	古惑女2		
2000		怪異集：你回來吧！		
2000	Conman in Tokyo	中華賭俠		
2002	The Story of Long	艷星秘密生活之她的一生		
2002	Murder in the First Degree	皇家保鏢		
2002	Snake Lover	蛇蠍情人		
2003	Feel 100% 2003	百分百感覺2003		
2003	Love for All Seasons	百年好合	Susan (Air Stewardess)	
2004	Ghost Story	寬頻聊齋		
2005	Kung Fu Mahjong 2	雀聖2自摸天后	Bo Bo	
2005	Slim Till Dead	瘦身		
2005	The Last Supper	最後的晚餐		
2006	Dating a Vampire	愛上屍新娘	Mary	
2006	Nothing Is Impossible	情意拳拳		
2006	Operation Undercover	臥虎		
2007	Wife from Hell	妻骨未寒		
2007	The Lady Iron Chef	美女食神		
2008	Hong Kong Bronx	黑勢力	Yoyo	
2010	Black Ransom	撕票風雲		
2012	Mr. and Mrs. Gambler	爛賭夫鬥爛賭妻	Shu Qing	

=== Television ===
Year	English title	Chinese title	Role	Notes/Ref.
1999	Untraceable Evidence II	鑑證實錄II	Cherry	
2000	Broadcast Life	FM701		
2002	Burning Flame II	烈火雄心II		
2003	Triumph in the Skies	冲上云霄	Li Li	
2003	Survivor's Law	律政新人王	Ye Cuishan	
2003	Life Begins at Forty	花樣中年	Janet	
2004	Angels of Mission	无名天使3D	CTU Policewoman	
2004	To Catch the Uncatchable	棟篤神探	Eva	
2005	A Dream Named Desire II	美丽传说2星愿		
2005	Central Affairs	情陷夜中环	Barbie	
2006	Hong Kong Criminal Files	香港奇案实录	Liao Xueshan/ Liao Xuerong	
2006	Central Affairs 2	情陷夜中环II	Huang Honghong	
2006	The Battle Against Evil	转世惊情	Yuan Xiaoxiao	
2007	The Royal Swordsmen	天下第一	Princess Lixiu	
2008	Flaming Butterfly	火蝴蝶	Qian Meimei	
2013	Earth God and Earth Grandmother	土地公土地婆	Cui Yu	
