= Mr. and Mrs. Gambler =

2012 Hong Kong film by Wong Jing

- Film poster
- Traditional Chinese: 爛賭夫鬥爛賭妻
- Simplified Chinese: 烂赌夫斗烂赌妻
- Hanyu Pinyin: Làn Dǔ Fū Dòu Làn Dǔ Qī
- Jyutping: Laan6 Dou2 Fu1 Dau3 Laan6 Dou2 Cai1
- Directed by: Wong Jing
- Written by: Wong Jing
- Produced by: Wong Jing
- Starring: Chapman To; Fiona Sit
- Cinematography: Edmond Fung
- Edited by: Lee Ka Wing
- Music by: Tang Chi Wai; Ben Chong
- Production company: Jing's Movie Production
- Distributed by: Gala Films Distribution
- Release date: 16 February 2012
- Running time: 110 minutes
- Country: Hong Kong
- Language: Cantonese
- Box office: HK$5,827,572

Mr. and Mrs. Gambler is a 2012 Hong Kong romantic comedy film written, produced and directed by Wong Jing and starring Chapman To and Fiona Sit.

== Plot ==
Manfred and Flora are compulsive gamblers who can gamble on anything 24 hours a day, seven days a week. They meet at a casino in Macau, where they both suffer heavy losses and are held hostage by loan sharks. During their hostage ordeal, they start to have passion for each other. When they meet in Hong Kong again, they finally fall in love and decide to get married. After they marry, their luck turns, and they make great progress in both their career and relationship. They soon give birth to their daughter. With the assistance of a charming producer, Michelle, Manfred gets the chance to take a leading role in a new movie. The Casino Boss, Sam, invites Flora to work for him to chase away the con men. In fact, Michelle and Sam are ex-lovers. Both of them are now attracted by Manfred and Flora’s unique characters and go for them in full strength. Manfred and Flora cannot resist the temptation and decide to get divorced. However, both of them would like to obtain their daughter’s custody rights.

== Cast ==
Cast	Role	Description
Chapman To	Manfred Shu 舒奇	Suffers from ludomania Film actor Won a Best Actor award in Africa; Sister San's son Flora Cheung's husband Shu Siu Siu's father Pursued by Michelle Siu; Competed with Flora Cheung of one week without gambling to win his daughter's custody Later forfeited out Father of three children Acted in Peerless Grandmaster 2012
Fiona Sit	Flora Cheung 張惠香	Suffers from ludomania Sam Wong's ex-assistant Manfred Cheung's wife Shu Siu Siu's mother Pursued by Sam Wong; Competed with Manfred Shu of one week without gambling to win her daughter's custody Canceled divorce later Mother of three children
Law Kar-ying	Shu Tak 舒突	Extra actor Manfred and Shu Ching's father Shu Siu Siu's grandfather
Mimi Chu	Pauline Cheung	Flora Cheung's mother Shu Siu Siu's grandmother
Sheh Cheuk Wing	Shu Siu Siu 舒小小	Manfred Shu and Flora Cheung's daughter
Michelle Hu	Michell Siu	Film director Sam Wong's ex-girlfriend Invited Manfred Shu to be her film's lead actor Pursues Manfred Shu; Flora Cheung's love rival
Philip Ng	Sam Wong	Casino owner Diamond bachelor Michelle Siu's ex-girlfriend Recruited Flora Cheung to fight of swindlers Pursues Flora Cheung; Manfred Shu's love rival
Wan Chiu	Chiu Na Sing 超那星	Manfred Shu's friend Manfred Shu's best man at his wedding Shu Ching's boyfriend
Zuki Lee	Shu Ching 舒青	Manfred Shu's younger sister Chiu Na Sing's girlfriend Accepted Sam Wong's HK$3 million bribe to betray Manfred Shu
King Kong	Kam Nga Kwai 金牙貴	Debt collector
Elena Kong	Judge 法官	Ordered Manfred Shu and Flora Cheung to compete against each other for one week without gambling to win their daughter's custody
Bonnie Wong	Sister San 珊姐	Shu Taks' wife Manfred and Shu Ching's mother Suffers from alzheimer's disease
Benz Hui		Cafe owner Cooperates with Flora Cheung to open another cafe
Harriet Yeung	Vulgarlina 核突縺娜	Flora Cheung's friend
Maria Cordero	Aunt Ten 十姨	Fortune teller Offered fortune telling for Flora Cheung
Matt Chow	Wong Ching Wai 王晶衛	International film director Beaten up by Michelle Siu's henchmen
Yuen Cheung-yan		Crazy guy
Victy Wong		Kam's man
Lee Hung Kei		Kam's man
Chan Ka Kai		Fat Girl
Andrew Dasz		Muscle Guy
Steven Dasz		Waiter
Lee Kin Hing		Casino Gambler
Michelle Wai		(Cameo)
Wan Kwong		(Cameo)
Bernard Chueng	Duncan	Assistant director
Fong Ho Yuen		Cameraman
Shek Kit Wah		Fat boy
Kevin Lui		Best man
Ricky Lee		Best man
Lai Tung Hong		Best man

== Theme song ==
"Compulsive Gambling God" (爛賭神君)

- Composer: Wu Man Sam
- Lyricist: Wan Kwong
- Singer: Wan Kwong, Chapman To

== Sequel ==
Due to the film's commercial success, director Wong Jing decided to make a sequel, titled Mr. and Mrs Player (爛滾夫鬥爛滾妻) starring Chapman To and Chrissie Chau. The film was released on 12 September 2013.
