= Kimmy Tong =

Chinese actress (born 1990)

Tong Fei
- 童菲
- Born: March 8, 1990 (age 36); Weifang, Shandong, China
- Other name: Kimmy Tong
- Education: Beijing Union University
- Occupation: Actress
- Years active: 2011-present
- Agent: Hua Shui Mu Studio
- Notable work: From Vegas to Macau
- Musical career
- Genres: Mandopop

Kimmy Tong Fei (Chinese: 童菲; pinyin: Tóng Feī; born 8 March 1990) is a Chinese actress best known in film for portraying A Cai in From Vegas to Macau film series.

== Early life and education ==
Tong was born in Weifang, Shandong on March 8, 1990. She graduated from Beijing Union University.

== Career ==
Tong was picked by a star agent in 2010 when she was a sophomore at university, and signed with the agency Mega-Vision Pictures Limited.

Her first major film credit was Treasure Hunt (2011), a comedy film directed by Wong Jing and stars Cecilia Cheung and Ronald Cheng. That same year, Tong had a minor role as Dong Dong in Hong Kong Ghost Stories, a horror film starring Jennifer Tse, Chrissie Chau, Stephy Tang, and Pakho Chau.

In February 2012, Tong was cast in the martial arts comedy film Princess and the Seven Kung Fu Masters, playing the daughter of Sammo Hung's character. In October, she co-starred with Hsu Chi and Huang Yali in the micro film Beautiful University. In December, she appeared as young A Bao, a beautiful girl who loves Huang Xiaoming's character, in the drama film The Last Tycoon.

In October 2013, Tong starred opposite Liza Wang, Angie Chiu, Hawick Lau, Tiffany Tang, Monica Mok, Wayne Lai, Selena Li, Kenny Wong, and Edwin Siu in Master of Destiny. She also sang the ending song Haven't changed in the drama.

In January 2014, Kimmy Tong had key supporting role in the comedy film From Vegas to Macau, alongside Chow Yun-fat, Nicholas Tse, Chapman To and Jing Tian. In March that year, she co-starred with Chapman To and Wong Cho-lam in Wilson Chin's fantasy comedy film Black Comedy.

In February 2015, Kimmy Tong reprised her role as A Cai in the From Vegas to Macau sequel, From Vegas to Macau II. In March, she played Li Li, the lover of Jiang Chao's character in the romance comedy film For Love to Let Go. In the following month, she played the female lead role in the comedy film The Rise of a Tomboy, alongside Zanilia Zhao, Hans Zhang and Jung Il-woo. In August of that year, she said she would reprise her role in From Vegas to Macau III. In December, she joined the main cast of Kungfu Boys as An Ran, a school teacher.

In May 2016, Tong portrayed an overseas student Lin Peixin in the French-Chinese romance thriller Lumiere Amoureuse. In June, she starred in a youth film called Our Graduation with Gao Taiyu, Ma Ding, and Xie Yingfei. In December, she co-starred with Hu Xia in the comedy film Youran Jian Nanshan.

== Filmography ==
=== Film ===
Year	English title	Chinese title	Role	Notes
2011	Treasure Hunt	无价之宝	Guest	
2011	Hong Kong Ghost Stories	猛鬼爱情故事	Dong Dong	
2012	The Last Tycoon	大上海	young A Bao	
2012	Young and Dangerous: Reloaded	古惑仔：江湖新秩序	Little stammerer	
2013	Princess and the Seven Kung Fu Masters	笑功震武林	Lin Xue'er	
2014	Black Comedy	黑色喜剧	An Qi	
2014	From Vegas to Macau	澳门风云	A Cai	
2015	For Love to Let Go	为爱放手	Li Li	
2015	From Vegas to Macau II	澳门风云2	A Cai	
2016	The Rise of a Tomboy	女汉子真爱公式	Sun Qiaoqiao	
2016	Kungfu Boys	龙拳小子	An Ran	
2016	From Vegas to Macau III	澳门风云3	A Cai	
2016	Our Graduation	我们毕业啦	Luo Xiaoqi	
TBA	You Ran Jian Nanshan	悠然见南山	Shen Youran	
TBA		济公之人皇鼎	Ru Xue	
TBA	Lumiere Amoureuse	暮光·巴黎	Lin Peixin	

=== TV series ===
Year	English title	Chinese title	Role	Notes
2015	Master of Destiny	风云天地	Cao Qiao'er	
2015	Two Idiots 3	废柴兄弟3	Du Xiaola	
2016	Two Idiots 4	废柴兄弟4	Du Xiaola	

=== Micro film ===
Year	English title	Chinese title	Role	Notes
2012	Beautiful University	美丽大学	Qu Ting'er	

=== MV ===
Year	English title	Chinese title	Singer	Notes
2015	Bad Girl	No Chinese name	Kris Wu	

== Music ==
Year	English title	Chinese title	Role	Notes
2015	Haven't changed	未曾改变		Ending song of Master of Destiny

== Photo album ==
Year	English title	Chinese title	Notes
2012	Kimmy Tong: Cruel Fairytales	童菲：残酷童话	
