= Elena Kong =

Hong Kong actress, radio DJ, and presenter

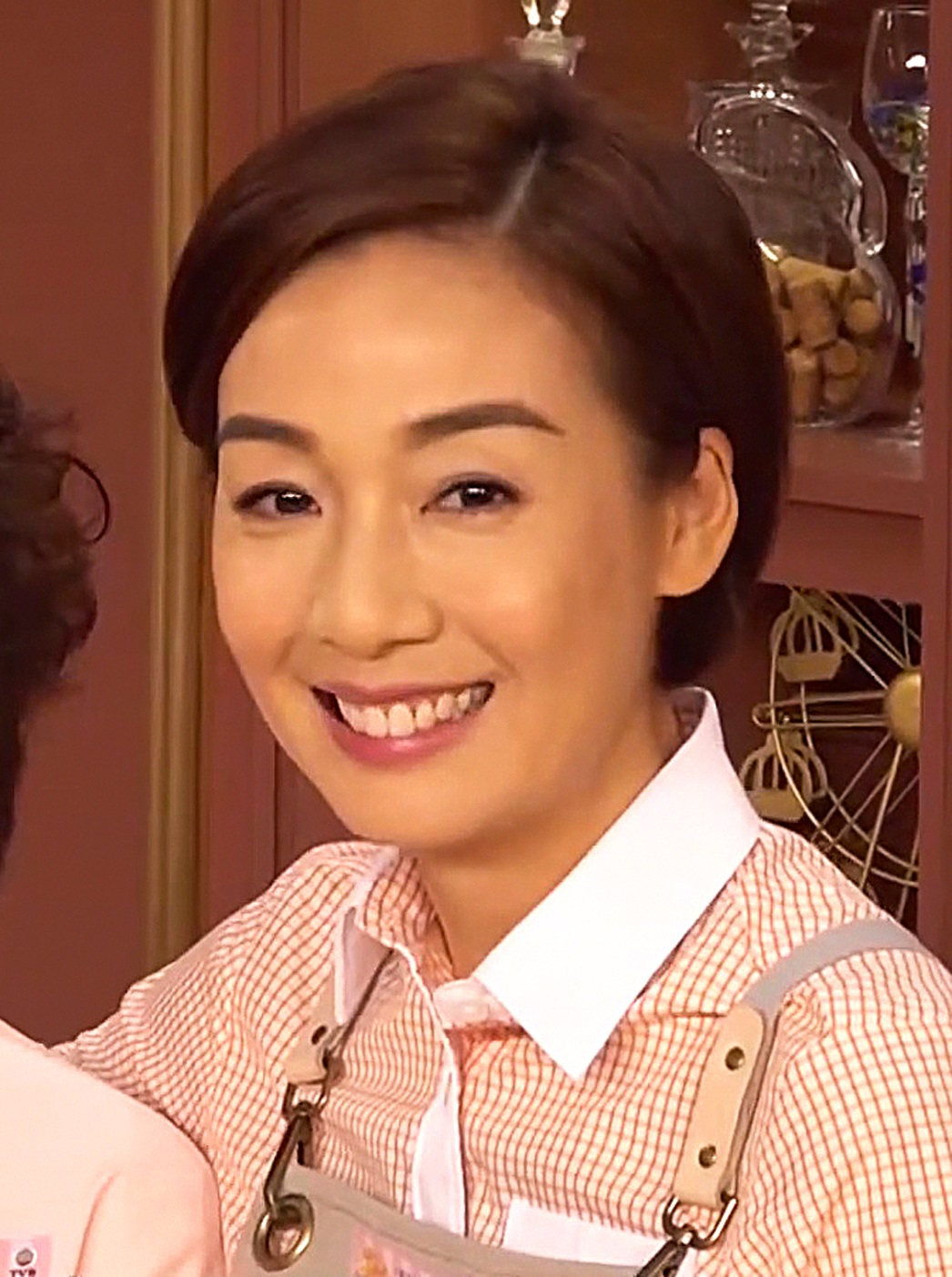
- Kong in 2020
- Born: British Hong Kong
- Occupations: Actress; radio DJ; television presenter
- Years active: 1990s–present
- Awards: TVB Anniversary Awards – Best Supporting Actress; 2013 Triumph in the Skies II; Best Actress; 2022 Get On A Flat

Chinese name
- Traditional Chinese: 江美儀
- Simplified Chinese: 江美仪
Transcriptions
Standard Mandarin
- Hanyu Pinyin: Jiāng Měiyí

Elena Kong May Yee is a Hong Kong actress, radio DJ, and television host.

== Career ==
Elena Kong started off her career in the entertainment industry as a model after being scouted and appeared in many television commercials during the 1990s. She also starred in some of Andy Lau's music videos. After joining Asia Television (ATV) in 1997, she landed her first lead role in television drama Forrest Cat. She left ATV in 2008. In 2009, Elena joined Television Broadcasts Limited (TVB). Her performance as Angela Auntie in Beauty Knows No Pain (2010) was well-received, which helped her earn a nomination for the Best Supporting Actress award at the 2010 TVB Anniversary Awards, where she placed among the top 5 nominations. Her performance as Yvonne Yik in Silver Spoon, Sterling Shackles (2012) gained her more popularity and recognition, garnering her third nomination Best Supporting Actress award at the 2012 TVB Anniversary Awards. At the 2013 TVB Anniversary Awards, she won the Best Supporting Actress award for her role as Heather Fong in the critical acclaimed Triumph in the Skies II (2013). At the 2022 TVB Anniversary Awards, she won the Best Actress with her role in the family drama Get On A Flat.

Kong was formerly a radio DJ at Digital Broadcasting Corporation Hong Kong Limited (DBC).

== Personal life ==
Elena studied Business Administration at the Chu Hai College of Higher Education.

== Filmography ==
=== Film ===
Title	Year	Role	Notes
Nine Girls and a Ghost	2002	To's girlfriend	
Happy Go Lucky	2003	Connie	
The Two Individual Package Women	2003	Helena Kim	
Lost in Time	2003	Siu-wai's sister	
Haunted Office	2004		
Driving Miss Wealthy	2004	Debbie	Voice (uncredited)
One Nite in Mongkok	2004	Nightclub Lady	
The Incredibles	2004	Mirage	Cantonese voice-over
Crazy n' the City	2005		
My Name is Fame	2006	Young doctor	
Confession of Pain	2006	Mrs. Lau	
Forget Me Not	2007		
W.	2008	reporter	
Vengeance	2009	Wolf's wife	
The Drunkard	2010	Lily	
Mr. & Mrs. Incredible	2011		Voice
Punished	2011	Daisy's mother	
A Beautiful Life	2011		
Demon 2	2011		
A Simple Life	2011		
Mr. and Mrs. Gambler	2012		
Bends	2013		
A Secret Between Us	2013		
Golden Chicken 3	2014		
The Gigolo	2015	Hung	
An Inspector Calls	2015		
Triumph in the Skies	2015	Heather Fong	
Return of the Cuckoo	2015		
Keeper of Darkness	2015		
From Vegas to Macau III	2016	Miss Ice	
Kidnap Ding Ding Don	2016		
Sisterhood	2016	Lai	
Always Be with You	2017		
The Supernormal 3	2018		
A Home with a View	2019		
The Crossing	2019		

=== Television dramas ===
Title	Year	Role	Notes
Forrest Cat	1997	Connie Hong Chun-ming	
My Brother, My Mum	1997	Ng Sin-yi	
A Lawyer Can Be Good	1998	Yuen Fong-yu	
Forrest Cat II	1999	Mandy Lee Man-yi	
My Date with a Vampire II	1999	Black Rain	
Showbiz Tycoon	2000	Yiu Chor-sau	
Hong Kong Yat Kar Yan	2000		
A Dream Named Desire	2000	Bobo Szema Po-kam	
Sun Dong Po	2000	Lau Yuet-mei	
Thank You, Grandpa	2001	Tung On-lai	
Lady Stealer	2002	Sin Sin	
Yau Kau Bit Ying	2002	Lui Wai-on	
Project Ji Xiang	2002	Dai Lai-hing	
Thunder Cops	2002	Fong Wing	
Light of Million Hopes	2003	Wan Yuet-ha / Wan Yuet-chu	
Hong Kong Special Cases	2006	Lui Wing-hor	Episodes 19-21
Mah Jong Gathering	2007	Money	
Flaming Butterfly	2008	Lui Pik-chu	
C'est La Vie, Mon Chéri	2008	Ma Man-lai	
The Season of Fate	2010	Tse Yuen-kwan	
Suspects in Love	2010	Bonnie	
Beauty Knows No Pain	2010	Angela "Angela Auntie" Hung San-wu	Nominated — TVB Anniversary Award for Best Supporting Actress (Top 5)
No Regrets	2010	Chiu Tung-nei	
Gun Metal Grey	2010	Rose Chow Chi-lun	Guest appearance (Episodes 3, 4, 24-26)
Dropping by Cloud Nine	2011	Ling's mother	Guest appearance (Episode 9)
Only You	2011	Fong Miu-kuen	Guest appearance (Episodes 14-15)
Lives of Omission	2011	Yuen Kwan-lam	Nominated — TVB Anniversary Award for Best Supporting Actress (Top 15)
River of Wine	2011	Ting Ka-pik	Nominated — TVB Anniversary Award for Best Actress (Top 15)
Curse of the Royal Harem	2011	Consort Dowager Shun	
Daddy Good Deeds	2012	Sheh Chi-man	Guest appearance (Episode 17)
Tiger Cubs	2012	Jenny Yu Hok-yan	Episodes 3-4
Ghetto Justice II	2012	Jenny Wai Tsan-nei	Episodes 2-5, 7-9
Silver Spoon, Sterling Shackles	2012	Yvonne Yik Yi-fong	Nominated — TVB Anniversary Award for Best Supporting Actress (Top 10)
Triumph in the Skies II	2013	Heather Fong ("Head姐")	Won - TVB Anniversary Award for Best Supporting Actress
Bounty Lady	2013	Yuen Sum	
The Ultimate Addiction	2014	Florence Chai Pui-fan	
Line Walker	2014	Katie Mok Sin-ching	
Raising the Bar	2015	Judge Amanda Lui	
Smooth Talker	2015	Lam Ah-lui	
Come with Me	2016	Mok Siu-tou	
Tiger Mom Blues	2017	Natalie Cha Heung-sin	
The Unholy Alliance	2017	Kam Tin (Rainman)	
Always Be With You	2017		
My Ages Apart	2017	Sheung Ho-sau	
Death by Zero	2020	Yiu Suk-han	Nominated — TVB Anniversary Award for Best Supporting Actress (Top 5)
Line Waker: Bull Fight	2020	Katie Mok Sin-ching	Guest appearance (Ep. 1-8)
Get On A Flat	2022	Karen Mok Man-Wai	Won — TVB Anniversary Award for Best Actress; Nominated — TVB Anniversary Award for Most Popular Female Character (Top 5); Nominated — TVB Anniversary Award for Favourite TVB Actress in Malaysia (Top 10); Nominated — TVB Anniversary Award for Most Popular Onscreen Partnership (Top 5; with Lam Man-chung)
The Invisibles	2023	Hilda Fong Kwok-hei (Madam Fong)	Nominated — TVB Anniversary Award for Best Supporting Actress
Romeo & Ying Tai	2023	To Lai	Nominated — TVB Anniversary Award for Best Supporting Actress
