= Michelle Hu =

Chinese actress (born 1990)

- 胡然
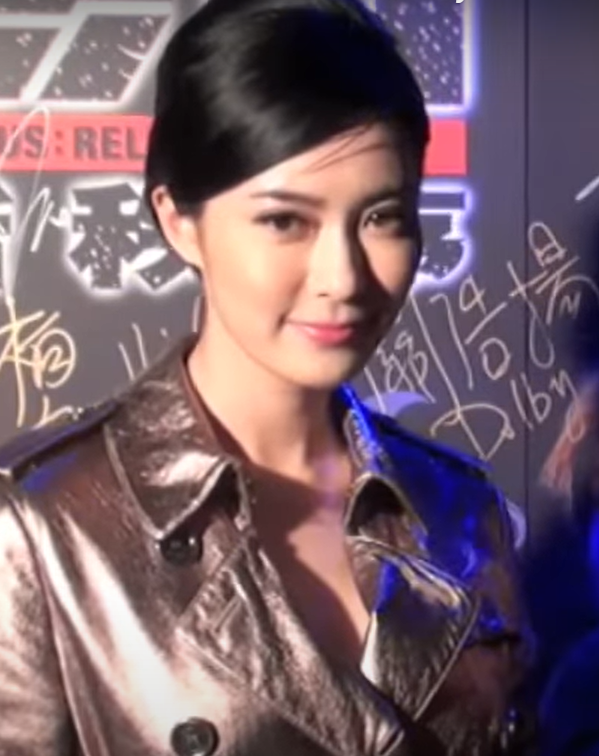
- Hu in October 2013
- Born: Hu Ran; 15 January 1990 (age 36); Tianjin, China
- Education: Communication University of China (BEng)
- Occupation: Actress
- Years active: 2011–present

Michelle Hu Ran (Chinese: 胡然; born 15 January 1990) is a Chinese actress best known for her roles in the crime film series From Vegas to Macau trilogy (2014–2016) and sci-fi series The Great Adventurer Wesley (2018). She frequently collaborates with director Wong Jing.

== Biography ==
Hu was born on 15 January 1990 in a well-off family in Tianjin, China. Her father is a teacher and cultivated her from an early age. She learnt singing, violin and swimming, and had thought of becoming a singer when she was young. She later attended the Communication University of China to study information engineering and graduated with a Bachelor of Engineering. After graduation, she temporarily worked as a technician. Hu was later introduced to director Wong Jing through an acquaintance from Wong's production company in 2010. Wong recognized Hu's acting potential for acting and signed her as an actress. She became one of Wong's frequent collaborators collectively known as "Jing girl" (Chinese: 晶女郎). Hu featured in Wong's 2011 wuxia television series Twin of Brothers and 2012 romance comedy film Mr. and Mrs. Gambler. In 2014, Hu was cast in a supporting lead role as an antagonistic assassin in Wong's crime comedy film From Vegas to Macau. She reprised her role in the sequels From Vegas to Macau II and From Vegas to Macau III. Hu also co-led the 2016 action thriller film Mission Milano alongside Andy Lau and starred in a main role in 2017 crime thriller film Chasing the Dragon.

In 2018, Hu was cast as Bai Su, the female protagonist of the sci-fi series The Great Adventurer Wesley, and garnered public recognition. She had a lead role in the 2021 crime thriller film Once Upon a Time in Hong Kong and appeared in the 2023 action thriller film Sakra.

== Filmography ==
=== Film ===
Year	Title	Role	Notes
2012	Mr. and Mrs. Gambler	Michelle	
2013	Young and Dangerous: Reloaded	Lorraine	
2014	Once Upon a Time in Shanghai	Tie Ju (鐵菊)	
2014	From Vegas to Macau	Purple (紫衣)	
2014	Sifu vs Vampire	Ming Tian (明天)	
2015	From Vegas to Macau II	Purple	
2016	From Vegas to Macau III	Purple	
2016	Mission Milano	Phoenix (鳳舞)	
2017	Chasing the Dragon	Jane (阿晴)	
2021	Once Upon a Time in Hong Kong	Yanni Chui (崔瑩恩)	
2023	Sakra	Mrs Xiao (蕭夫人)	

=== Television ===
Year	Title	Role	Notes
2011	Twin of Brothers	Shang Xiu Xun (商秀珣)	Guest role
2018	The Great Adventurer Wesley	Bai Su	Main role
2023	The Starry Love	Queen Yingzhao (沉淵王后)	Main role
2023	Story of Kunning Palace	Yan Min (燕敏)	Cameo
