= Line Walker: The Prelude =

Hong Kong TV series

- Promotional Poster
- Also known as: Line Walker 2
- 使徒行者2
- Genre: Modern; Crime; Action; Thriller
- Starring: Michael Miu; Moses Chan; Jessica Hsuan; Benjamin Yuen; Chau Pak-ho; Priscilla Wong; Benz Hui
- Opening theme: "Skynet" (天網) by Pakho Chau
- Ending theme: "Forgot Myself" (忘記我自己) by Hana Kuk; "Behave Oneself" (安守本份) by Vivian Koo (谷婭溦)
- Countries of origin: Hong Kong, China
- Original languages: Chinese (Cantonese, Mandarin)
- No. of episodes: 30

Production
- Producer: So Man Chung
- Production locations: Hong Kong, China; Shenzhen, China; Taiwan; Thailand; South Korea; Myanmar, Yangon
- Production company: TVB

Original release
- Network: Tencent Video; TVB Jade
- Release: 18 September – 27 October 2017

Related
- Line Walker (2014); Line Walker: Bull Fight (2020)

Line Walker: The Prelude (Chinese: 使徒行者2; Cantonese Yale: Sitòu Hàngjé2), also known as Line Walker 2, is a 2017 crime drama produced by TVB. Premiered on September 18, 2017, it serves as the prequel to Line Walker (2014). It stars Michael Miu, Moses Chan, Jessica Hsuan, Benjamin Yuen, Chau Pak-ho, Priscilla Wong, and Benz Hui.

Michael Miu won My Favourite TVB Actor in a Leading Role at the 2017 TVB Star Awards Malaysia.

A third season taking place three years after the events of Line Walker premiered on November 9, 2020.

== Synopsis ==
In 2010, Cheuk Hoi (Michael Miu) secretly travels to Bangkok to conduct a drug operation with his undercover agents in Thailand. Despite the success of the mission, all of Cheuk Hoi's undercover agents are killed in a sea of fire. Back in Hong Kong, Cheuk Hoi's good friend CIB Inspector Lai Sui Kuen (Eddie Cheung), is killed by masked gunmen, leaving Cheuk Hoi to take charge of Cheng Suk Mui (Priscilla Wong) who is not yet officially an undercover. Cheuk Hoi knows that Lai Sir still has undercover agents whose identities have been deleted. To learn the truth about Lai Sir's death, Cheuk Hoi works with Cheng Suk Mui to find and secure the remaining of his late-friend's undercover agents while dealing with corrupt officials in the Hong Kong Police Force. Meanwhile, Chum Foon Hei (Benz Hui) swears to avenge the death of his wife and goes head to head with Victor Ngai (Moses Chan), the leader of the Cheung Heung triad.

== Cast ==
=== Criminal Intelligence Bureau (CIB) ===
Cast	Role	Description
Michael Miu 苗僑偉	Cheuk Hoi 卓凱	Senior Inspector (SIP) of Hong Kong’s Criminal Intelligence Bureau(CIB) Resigned in episode 10 to investigate the mystery identity of the crooked cop and find the remaining unknown undercover agents. Personal Bodyguard of Sze Ka Lei (Scarlett) from episode 10 to episode 18 and reinstated as Senior Inspector in episode 18. Made a civil CIB group from former police officers in episode 18. Good friends with Sze Ka Lei Admired Sze Ka Lei Arrested Sze Ka Lei (Scarlett) in episode 30.
Benz Hui 許紹雄	Chum Foon Hei 覃歡喜	Former Undercover Agent He deleted his own UC file in episode 2 Triad Leader of Fook Wo Restaurant owner Victor's enemy (Anti-Villain)
Pakho Chau 周柏豪	Lok Siu Fung 樂少鋒	Gangster, works for Pak-key, later works for Chum Foon Hei Undercover Agent, revealed in episode 4, later revealed to have been pretending to be the undercover agent in episode 25. In truth, the real undercover agent was his deceased older brother, Lok Siu Man (樂少文) who got killed while investigating the crooked cops' identities in Thailand. Revealed to have been murdering crooked cops in episode 24 to find the killer of his brother. Killed Madam Cheung in episode 25. Shot by Chui Tin Tong in episode 29. Revealed to have been saved by Chum Foon Hei in episode 30
Benjamin Yuen 袁偉豪	Chui Tin Tong 徐天堂	Gangster and works for Ngai Tak Sun (Victor) Likes Jeng Suk Mui Revealed as an undercover agent in episode 15 . Forced to shoot Lok Siu Fung by Victor in episode 29.
Priscilla Wong 黃翠如	Cheng Shuk Mui 鄭淑梅	Undercover Agent Likes Lok Siu Fung; Sze Ka Lei's personal assistant died in line walker 3
Joman Chiang 蔣祖曼	Madam Cheung 張雪晴	CIB Chief Superintendent and Supervisor of Cheuk Hoi and Ben Sir Revealed to be a crooked cop in episode 18. Manipulated Ben Sir into becoming a crooked cop. Died in episode 25, killed by Lok Siu Fung. Girlfriend of Hui Sir (Villain)
Eddie Cheung 張兆輝	Lai Sir 黎瑞權	Guest Star from episode 1 to 2 CIB Chief Inspector; Good friend and colleague of Cheuk Hoi; Died in episode 2, killed by a mysterious group wearing masks who took his USB drive containing his undercover agents' identities informations. Former undercover handler of Cheng Suk Mui, Lok Siu Wen, Chui Tin Tong, Yeung Wing (Cherry) and Leung Si Mun.
Nathan Ngai 魏焌皓	Ben Sir 朱志彬	OCTB / CIB Inspector; Take over Cheuk Hoi's CIB position in episode 10; Cheuk Hoi's apprentice Yeung Wing's boyfriend manipulated by Madam Cheung into becoming a crooked cop. Died in episode 23, killed by Hui Sir when taking Madam Cheung hostage in the police station. (Villain)

=== Other main and recurring cast ===
Cast	Role	Description
Moses Chan 陳豪	Ngai Tak Shun (Victor) 魏德信	Cheung Hing Triad Leader; Entrepreneur; Mr. White's secret business partner until episode 20. Likes Sze Ka Lei; Has been working with black cops who remove his enemies for him. Taken over the Largest international criminal organization in Asia in episode 24 after getting rid of Johnny; Killed by Chum Foon Hei in episode 30. Chan portrays a different character despite appearing in the 2016 film of the same name. (Main Villain)
Jessica Hsuan 宣萱	Sze Ka Lei (Scarlett) 施嘉莉	Former Loan saleswoman Business partner of Victor until episode 25; Revealed to be a former undercover agent of British Secret Service (MI6) in episode 14. Likes Ngai Dak Sun; Revealed to have an implanted remote time bomb microchip in her brain placed by Leung Si Mun, ordered by Johnny as an insurance against Victor if he double crosses him. Good friends with Cheuk Hoi; Arrested by Cheuk Hoi in episode 30. (Semi-Villain)
Louisa Mak 麥明詩	Yeung Wing (Cherry) 楊詠	Loan saleswoman Ben's girlfriend Revealed to be an Undercover Agent in episode 19-20. Killed by Ben Sir after her identity as an Undercover Agent is exposed to the black cops in episode 21.
Alice Chan 陳煒	Lau Kam Ying 劉錦瑩	Guest Star in episode 2 Chum Foon-hei's wife Died in episode 2, killed by Victor's men.
Tony Hung 洪永城	Wing-Cheong	Guest Star in episode 1 Undercover agent in Thailand; Died in episode 1, killed by an explosion in the hideout along with the other four undercover agents.
Stephanie Ho 何雁詩	Sparrows 雀 雀	Guest Star in episode 1 Undercover agent in Thailand; Died in episode 1, killed by an explosion in the hideout along with the other four undercover agents.
Koo Ming Wah 古明華	Tomato	Guest Star in episode 1 Driver; Undercover agent in Thailand; Died in episode 1, killed by an explosion in the hideout along with the other four undercover agents.
Shiga Lin 連詩雅	Luen (Birdy)	Guest Star in episode 1 Undercover agent in Thailand; Died in episode 1, killed by an explosion in the hideout along with the other four undercover agents.
Yeung Chiu Hoi 楊潮凱	Raptor	Tattoo artist Undercover agent in Thailand; Died in episode 1, killed by an explosion in the hideout along with the other four undercover agents. Revealed to have survived the explosion in the hideout in episode 22. Revealed to be one who caused the explosion in the hideout in episode 26. Revealed to be one of Ngai Dai Sun's henchmen and joins King's side. Killed by Ngai Dai Sun for his betrayal in episode 30. (Villain)
Kenny Wong 黃德斌	Pak-key 鄭弼奇	Guest Star from episode 1 to 5 Thailand gang leader Friend & boss of Lok Siu Fung Tried to help Chum Foon Hei but died in episode 5, killed in car crash driven by a high man (Semi-Villain)
James Kazama 丘占輝	Mr.White	Largest international criminal organization in Asia co-leader Business partner/rival of Johnny; Victor's secret business partner Dies in episode 20, killed by Victor to win the trust of Johnny. (Villain)
Karen Lee 李焯寧	Leung Si Man 梁斯敏	Largest international criminal organization in Asia Agent; Old Toy Gallery exhibit owner works for Johnny, in truth she was working for Victor who wants to take over the Largest international criminal organization in Asia. Working with Chum Foon Hei to go against Victor; Revealed to have implanted a remote time bomb microchip in Scarlett's brain by order of Johnny which she uses it as an insurance against Victor when he threatens her in episode 26. Revealed to be an undercover agent working for Lai Sir in episode 27. Suffering from terminal cancer causing her to use extreme methods for taking down Victor before she dies Indirectly revealed to have been killed by Ngai Dai Sun in episode 29. (Anti-Villain)
Patrick Dunn 鄧梓峰	Hui Sir 許启發	Assistant Commissioner of Hong Kong police Supervisor of Madam Cheung, Cheuk Hoi, and Ben Sir; Revealed to be the high-rank black cop behind Madam Cheung and has been working with Victor in episode 25; Madam Cheung's ex-boyfriend Revealed to be an imposter, in truth, the real Hui sir died a long time ago during his undercover mission in episode 28. Killed by Lok Siu Fung in episode 28 (Villain)
Jimmy Au 歐瑞偉	Hong To-hang 康道行	OCTB Inspector; Promoted to CIB Chief Inspector in episode 27; Good friend and colleague of Cheuk Hoi; Choosing new undercover agents in the final episode which set up the beginning for the first season.
Gill Mohindepaul Singh 喬寶寶	Yu Lok Sing	Former assistant bomb disposal police officer One of the three former police officers that Cheuk Hoi recruited to help him against the black cops in episode 18.
Kandy Wong 黃山怡	Law Siu Sze	Former police communication officer One of the three former police officers that Cheuk Hoi recruited to help him against the black cops in episode 18.
Penny Chan 陳國峰	Lee Man Hung	Former police band member One of the three former police officers that Cheuk Hoi recruited to help him against the black cops in episode 18.
Jacky Yeung 楊鴻俊	Johnny	Largest international criminal organization in Asia co-leader Business partner/rival of Mr.White; Victor's secret business partner in episode 21 that wanted to get rid of Mr.White. killed during his arrest in episode 24 by Cheuk Hoi. (Villain)
Tyson Chak 翟凱泰	Mr. King	Largest international criminal organization in Asia client Business partner and friend of Mr.White; Killed by Victor in episode 30 for taking Scarlett hostage. (Villain)
Kenneth Ma 馬國明	Ngai Tak Lai (Samuel)	Special Appearance in episode 30; Younger brother of Ngai Tak Shun (Victor); Sworn vengeance toward Cheuk Hoi, Chum Foon Hei, Chui Tin Tong and Cheng Suk Mui for the death of Victor in the final episode. (Villain)

== Development ==
After the success of Line Walker, TVB had plans to produce a second season. A poster for Line Walker 2 was introduced at the 2016 TVB Sales Presentation featuring Charmaine Sheh, Benz Hui, and Michael Miu. Lead actor Raymond Lam did not renew his management contract with TVB, and was not considered for Line Walker 2. Sheh ultimately did not return for the second season.

Filming for the drama began in October 2016. Using the working title Line Walker 2, the drama series was jointly produced by TVB and Tencent's Penguin Pictures. A pre-filming ceremony held on November 2 introduced returning cast members Michael Miu, Benz Hui, and Vincent Lam, with Moses Chan, Jessica Hsuan, Benjamin Yuen, Chau Pakho, and Priscilla Wong joining the cast. Kenny Wong, Louisa Mak, Alice Chan, and Kandy Wong were also present. Filming took place in Hong Kong, Bangkok, and Shenzhen.

== See also ==
- Line Walker
