= Benz Hui =

Chinese actor from Hong Kong (1948–2025)

- 許紹雄
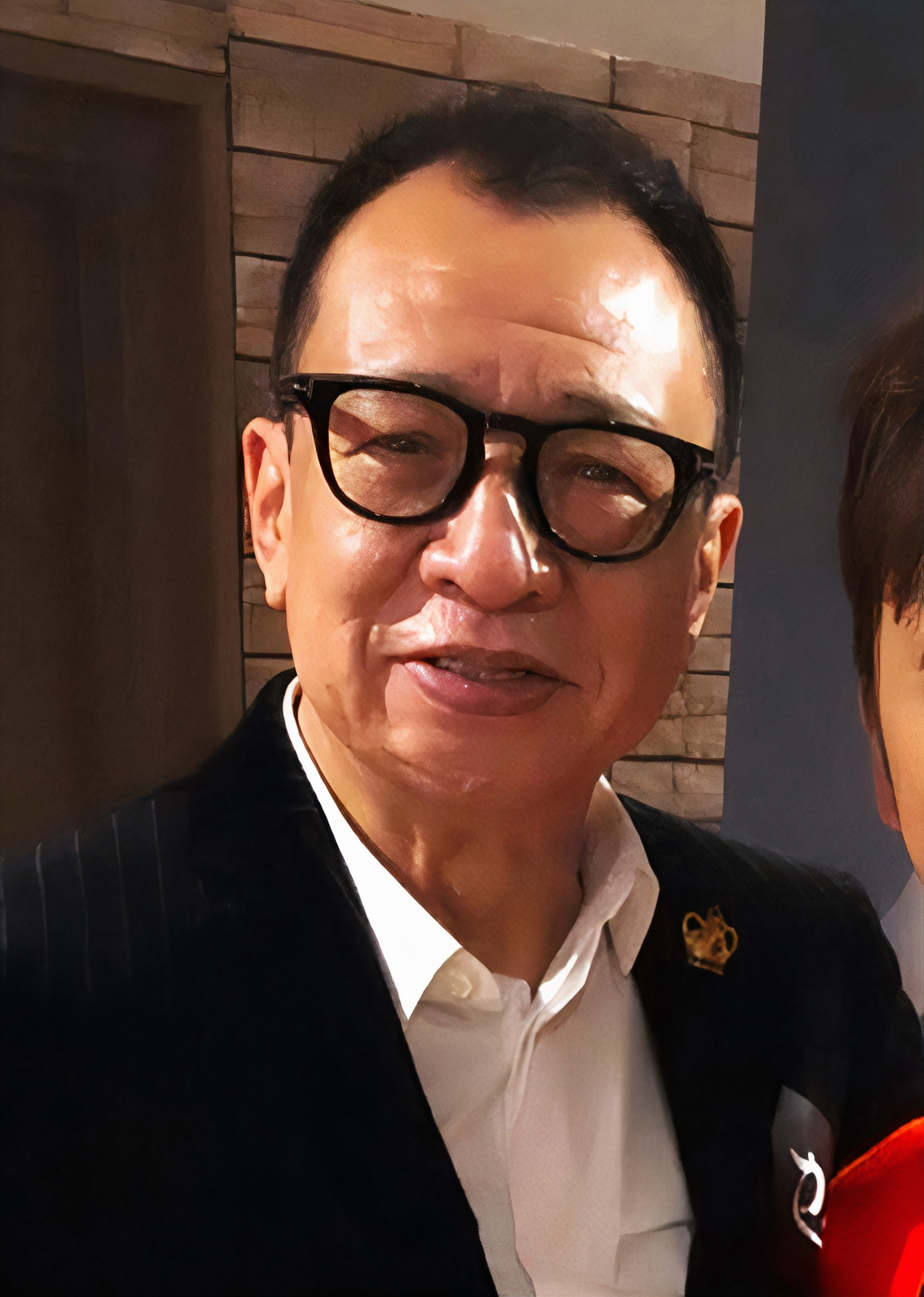
- Hui in 2020
- Born: Hui Shiu-hung; 4 November 1948; Hong Kong
- Died: 28 October 2025 (aged 76); Hong Kong Sanatorium and Hospital, Happy Valley, Hong Kong
- Other names: Xu Shao-Xiong; Hsu Shao-Hsiung
- Occupation: Actor
- Years active: 1970–2025
- Spouse: Lung Yin-yi (m. 1992)
- Children: 1 daughter and 1 stepson
- Relatives: Xu Yingkui (ancestor); Xu Guangping (great-aunt)
- Awards: TVB Anniversary Awards – Outstanding Artiste (2012); Best Supporting Actor; 2013 Bounty Lady; Favourite Male Character; 2014 Line Walker

Chinese name
- Traditional Chinese: 許紹雄
- Simplified Chinese: 许绍雄
Transcriptions
Standard Mandarin
- Hanyu Pinyin: Xǔ Shào Xióng

"Benz" Hui Shiu-hung (Chinese: 許紹雄; 4 November 1948 – 28 October 2025) was a Hong Kong film and television actor in over 165 films. Appearing on TVB, he was known as the "King of Supporting Actors".

== Early life and family ==
Hui moved to Hong Kong in 1958. Hui enrolled in the Artist Training Class at Television Broadcasts Limited in 1971.

Hui came from an influential family in Canton. His great-grandfather, Xu Yingkui, was a godson of Empress Dowager Cixi and served as an imperial official during the late Qing dynasty. Hui's great-aunt, Xu Guangping, was the partner of writer Lu Xun. His granduncle Xu Chongzhi (Cantonese: Hui Chung-chi) was a founder of the Whampoa Military Academy, while his other granduncle Xu Chongqing (Cantonese: Hui Chung-ching) once served as an education minister of Canton.

== Career ==
Prior to acting, Hui joined Commercial Radio Hong Kong. There, colleague Charles Tang Wing-hung nicknamed him "Benz" as he was the only person to drive a Mercedes-Benz to work.

In 1972, Hui started his acting career in Young People, a 1972 film directed by Chang Cheh. He shone in supporting roles of various television series, including Inspector Wong in Running Out of Time in 1999. Hui would be nominated for Best Supporting Actor for his role as Inspector Wong in the 19th Hong Kong Film Awards. Hui was credited with over 165 films.

In 2013, Hui won the Best Supporting Actor at the 2013 TVB Anniversary Awards for his role in the comedy series Bounty Lady.

In 2014, Hui acted as Chum Foon-hei in the TVB serial drama Line Walker which boosted his acting career. He won the Most Popular Male Character at the 2014 TVB Anniversary Awards for this role. As a result, he clinched several commercial appearances, acting roles in mainland dramas, and a guest appearance on the film adaption of the drama serial. He was also nicknamed Foon-hei Gor, or Brother Foon-hei, after his character.

== Personal life and death ==
Hui met Angeli Hui (née Yin-yi Lung), a Singaporean, in the 1980s when he worked in Singapore. Lung has a son from her previous marriage and then a daughter, Charmaine Hui, with Hui in 1997. To help their daughter who struggled with mathematics under Hong Kong's education system, Hui and his wife opened a Singaporean-style tutoring school in Hong Kong.

On 27 October 2025, Hui was reportedly hospitalised and in critical condition, many artists eventually arrived at the hospital for a visit. He died the next day, on 28 October, a week before his 77th birthday. The cause of death was multiple organ failure due to kidney cancer.

== Filmography ==
=== Films ===
Year	Title	Role	Notes
1972	Young People	music group member	
1973	Hong Kong Style		
1973	The Kiss of Death	Pimp	
1973	The Master of Kung Fu	Su Nan	
1974	The Looks of Hong Kong		
1974	A Mad World of Fools		
1974	The Fool and His Money		
1974	Games Gamblers Play	Bully	
1975	Pretty Swindler		
1975	Maids-in-Waiting		
1977	Bed for Day, Bed for Night		
1985	Crazy Games		
1985	Working Class	Kickboxer's trainer	
1985	Seven Angels	complaint against Police Officer	
1985	It's a Drink! It's a Bomb!	Lee's superior at fair	a.k.a. It's a Drink, It's a Bomb a.k.a. Christmas Romance
1986	Last Song in Paris	David	
1986	Royal Warriors (In the Line of Duty)	Meaty	
1987	The Gang Don't Shoot Straight	Wai's boss	a.k.a. The Goofy Gang
1989	Return of the Lucky Stars	Hung	a.k.a. Lucky Stars Triad Society
1989	Life Goes On		
1989	Excuse Me, Please!		a.k.a. Excuse Me Please
1990	Heart Into Hearts	Ho	
1990	A Bite of Love	Duke Lee's servant	
1990	Fortune Chasers		a.k.a. Fortune Chaser
1990	BB 30	Pao	
1991	You Bet Your Life	Snake	a.k.a. A Charmed Life
1991	An Eternal Combat	Catholic priest	
1991	The Perfect Match	Sherman/Toothpick	
1991	Forbidden Arsenal	Hui Sir	a.k.a. In the Line of Duty VI a.k.a. In the Line of Duty 6
1991	His Fatal Ways	Au Yeung Fu	a.k.a. His Fatal Way
1991	Take Me	Milk's First Husband	
1991	Today's Hero	Tao	
1992	Ghost in Me	Night Driver	
1992	The New Marvelous Double		
1992	Heart Against Hearts	flashback	
1992	Casino Tycoon II	Kao Ming	
1992	Naked Killer	Old Jerk	
1992	Basic Impulse	Ming's Dad	
1993	Legal Innocence	Patrick's defense lawyer	a.k.a. Legal Innocent a.k.a. B. T. R. S.
1993	Kidnap of Wong Chak Fai	Siu Lee	
1998	Expect the Unexpected	Ben	
1998	The Pale Sky		
1998	Magnificent Team	Sgt. Yau	
1998	Love in the River	Big Mouth Alan	
1998	Nightmare Zone	Boasting Hsiong	
1999	The Doctor in Spite of Himself	Law Hon Kuo	
1999	Hanky Panky		
1999	Running Out of Time	Chief Inspector Wong Kai Fai	
1999	Victim	Detective Yee	
2000	Troublesome Night 7	Tat	
2000	My Name is Nobody	Mr. Chicken	
2000	Desirous Express		
2000	The Hong Kong Happy Man	K.Y. Lau	
2000	Needing You...	Ronald	
2000	Home of a Villain		a.k.a. Home for a Villain
2000	Help!!!	Dr. Leon	
2000	Romancing Bullet	Tang's superior	
2000	Diamond Hill	May's father	
2000	The Killer of the Lonely Heart	Uncle Monk	
2000	Bio-Cops	Shek	
2001	There is a Secret in my Soup	Policeman coming down stairs	
2001	Wu Yen	Emperor of Chu	
2001	Clueless	Officer Wong	
2001	Gangs 2001		
2001	Master Q 2001	Superintendent Hugh	
2001	Everyday is Valentine	Mr. Chan	
2001	Electrical Girl	Mr. King	
2001	Gold Fingers		
2001	Final Romance	Police Officer	a.k.a. Wishing Tree
2001	Dummy Mommy, Without a Baby	Wu Faye	
2001	Let's Sing Along	Stephen	
2001	Running Out of Time 2	Superintendent Wong Kai-Fa	
2002	Fighting to Survive	Brother Fat	a.k.a. Bodyguard of the Neighbourhood
2002	Love Undercover	Officer Chung	
2002	The Irresistible Piggies	Turtle's father	
2002	Summer Breeze of Love	Louis Choi	
2002	If You Care...	Polo	a.k.a. If U Care...
2002	The Lion Roars	So Tung-Po	
2002	The Mummy, Aged 19	Bobo Luke's dad	
2002	Conman 2002	Inspector Chan	a.k.a. The Conman 2002
2002	Shark Busters	Sergeant Benz Hui	
2002	Golden Chicken	club customer #23	
2003	The Final Shot		
2003	Love Under the Sun		a.k.a. Love Under the Sun - World AIDS Campaign
2003	Looking for Mr. Perfect	Teddy	a.k.a. Looking for Mister Perfect
2003	Love Undercover 2: Love Mission	Sergeant Chung	
2003	Shiver	Ming's superior	
2003	Turn Left, Turn Right	George	
2003	Anna in Kung-Fu Land	Boss Pak	a.k.a. Anna & Wulin
2004	Hardrock Affairs		
2004	Protégé de la Rose Noire	Lee Shou-Fu	a.k.a. Black Rose Academy
2004	Herbal Tea	Lier	a.k.a. Herbal Tea Story
2004	Sex and the Beauties	Taipan Shek	a.k.a. Love & the City
2004	Love on the Rocks	Annie's father	
2004	Driving Miss Wealthy	Police officer	
2004	Breaking News	Sergeant Hoi	
2004	Heat Team	Mr. Fok	
2004	Three of a Kind	P Leung	
2004	Hidden Heroes	Toran / Blindfold Bandit	
2004	Yesterday Once More	Private investigator	a.k.a. In the Nick of Love
2004	The White Dragon	Deer Tail	
2005	Crazy N' the City	Hung	
2005	It Had to Be You!	Jacob	a.k.a. It Had to Be You
2005	A.V.	Film Professor	a.k.a. AV
2005	2 Young	Uncle Yiu	
2005	All About Love	Mr. Leung	
2006	McDull, the Alumni	Inspector K.C. Wong	
2006	My Kung-Fu Sweetheart	Lincoln Lam	
2006	2 Become 1	Mr. Hui	
2006	Love Undercover 3	Sergeant Chung	
2006	Rob-B-Hood	Prison Officer	U.S. title: Robin-B-Hood
2006	Fatal Contact	Morgue worker	
2006	Exiled	Sergeant Shan	
2006	Mr. 3 Minutes	Li Takmi	
2007	A Night Surprise	Kwong Yan	
2007	Pandora's Booth	Discipline master	
2007	Luxury Fantasy		
2007	Super Fans	Hui	
2007	Gong Tau	Fat Wah	a.k.a. Oriental Black Magic
2007	Single Blog	Boss	
2007	Simply Actors	Officer Lin	
2007	Hooked On You	Brother Hung	
2007	Wonder Women	Uncle Nine	
2007	Fear Factors	Beggar	
2008	Love Is......		
2008	Fatal Move	Tong Lai Yu	
2008	Ocean Flame	Mr. Luo	a.k.a. Half Flame, Half Brine
2008	Legendary Assassin	Grant Gong	
2009	Give Love		a.k.a. Give and Love
2009	A Very Short Life	Herman Lee	
2009	Team of Miracle: We Will Rock You	Szeto	
2009	Happily Ever After		
2010	Beauty on Duty		
2010	La Comédie humaine	Setting Sun	
2010	Amaya		
2010	My Sassy Girl 2		
2011	I Love Hong Kong		
2011	Summer Love		
2012	I Love Hong Kong 2012		
2012	Mr. and Mrs. Gambler		
2012	Meet the In-Laws	Su Bohu	
2012	The Lion Roars 2		
2013	I Love Hong Kong 2013		
2013	SDU: Sex Duties Unit		
2013	Out of Inferno		
2014	From Vegas to Macau		
2014	Black Comedy		
2014	Delete My Love		
2015	12 Golden Ducks		
2016	Kidnap Ding Ding Don		
2016	Line Walker	Foon Hei Gor	
2019	Bye! Mr. Wang		
2020	The Spy Walker		
2021	Embrace Again	Pei Ye	
2023	The Locksmith		
2025	Queen of Mahjong		

=== TV series ===
Year	Title	Role	Notes
1979	Passenger	Luk Wing Tai	
1979	The Good, the Bad and the Ugly	Chu Bak Keung	
1980	The Adventurer's	Wong Yat Cheung	
1981	The Three Musketeers		
1981	The Fate		
1982	Demi-Gods and Semi-Devils	Cho Chi Muk	
1982	Love with Many Phases		
1983	The Legend of the Condor Heroes	Chu Cung	
1983	The Return of the Condor Heroes	Kung Suen Chi	
1983	The Man in the Middle		a.k.a. Sandwiches
1984	The Clones		
1984	Love Me, Love Me Not		
1984	The Duke of Mount Deer	Do Lung	
1984	Police Cadet '84	Hui Siu Dung	
1984	The New Adventures of Chor Lau-heung	Tso Hing-hau	
1985	The Battle Among the Clans	Wah Biu	
1985	The Yang's Saga	Siu Tin Yau	
1985	The Flying Fox of Snowy Mountain	Yim Gai	
1985	Police Cadet '85	Hui Siu Dung	
1985	Happy Spirit		
1986	Siblings of Vice and Virtue		
1986	The Unyielding Master Lim		
1986	Turn Around and Die		
1986	New Heavenly Sword and Dragon Sabre	Wai Yat Siu	
1987	The Grand Canal	Syun Dou Si	
1987	The Conspiracy		
1987	The Legend of the Book and the Sword	Ah Fan Tai	
1987	Police Cadet '88	Hiu Siu Dung	
1988	Behind Silk Curtains		
1989	The Final Combat	Chin Man Lee	a.k.a. Final Combat
1989	Family Fortune	Hung Jan Yu	
1989	The Justice of Life	Ma Ging Lei	
1989	Yankee Boy	Ho Tai Dai	
1991	The Breaking Point	Ko Tin Luk	
1991	Be My Guest	Wat Yan Git	
1991	Big Family		a.k.a. The Big Family
1992	Love and Marriage		
1992	The Mark Of Triumph		
1992	Super Cop	Cheung Kan Fu	
1992	The Key Man	Lok Man	
1993	Romance Beyond	Ng Bak Tong	
1993	The Link	Wong Sai Kau	
1994	Fate of the Clairvoyant	Cheung Syu Yan	
1994	Instinct	Bau Jan	
1994	The Emperor and I	Fong Dak	
1995	Forty Something	Ma Jeun Git	
1995	Debts of a Life Time		
1996	Crossing Boundaries	Jung Ching	
1996	The Criminal Investigator II	Fong Sai Yin	
1996	One Good Turn Deserves Another		
1996	In the Name of Love	Tin Nga Hung	
1997	Deadly Protection		
1999	Happy Ever After	Hoi Mong	
1999	Ultra Protection	Lui Chi Dat	
1999	Life for Life		
1999	Witness to a Prosecution	Sung Sing	
2000	Time Off	Lee Sing	
2000	A Matter of Customs		
2000	Green Hope		
2001	Law Enforcers	Chan Chau	
2002	Love is Beautiful	Ling Tiet	
2002	The White Flame	Yu Sei Hoi	Warehoused and broadcast in 2007
2002	Police Station No. 7	Wong Chi Cheung	Warehoused and broadcast in 2004
2002	Golden Faith	Kam Wan Hung (Henry)	
2002	Lofty Waters Verdant Bow	Hiu Fung	
2002	Square Pegs	Ting Yau Lik	
2003	The 'W' Files	Sung Kin	
2003	Survivor's Law	Lok Gin	
2004	The Vigilante in the Mask	Au Yeung Guai	
2004	Hard Fate	Tsang Shu-hung	
2004	To Love With No Regrets	Cheung Hin	
2004	To Get Unstuck in Time	Ho Tai Ho	
2004	Split Second	Lam Yau-wai	
2004	Hidden Treasures	Kwok Tai Hoi	
2005	Lost in the Chamber of Love	To Fai/Wong Sum	
2005	The Gentle Crackdown	Lo Chou	
2005	Yummy Yummy	Chan Wai	
2005	Into Thin Air	Lai Chau	
2005	Life Made Simple	Tong Fok Shui	
2005	Always Ready	Ko Yu Cheung	
2006	Lethal Weapons of Love and Passion	Hui Yuk Mo	
2006	Under the Canopy of Love	Sum Shau Ching	
2006	At Home With Love	Ying Yan	
2006	Dicey Business	Chau Fok Wing	
2007	The Slicing of the Demon	Kei Hok Yu	
2007	The Drive of Life	Ngai Ling Tai	
2007	Men Don't Cry	So Fei	
2008	Wars of In-Laws II	But Ping Fan	
2008	C'est La Vie, Mon Cheri	Li Zai Sheng	Remake of the 1994 film of the same name
2008	Dressage to Win	Cashier	Guest appearance (ep. 1)
2008	When a Dog Loves a Cat	Miu Tai Mo	
2008	Your Class or Mine	Fan Tai Wai	
2009	Just Love II	Ho Shi Fu	
2009	The King of Snooker	Yau Yi Po	
2009	You're Hired	Tong Kat	
2009	Love Kickoff	Ying Yat Hung	
2009	Born Rich	Tai Wing-luk	
2010	The Season of Fate	Ding Boss	
2010	The Comeback Clan	Yip Mo-sing	
2010–2011	Show Me the Happy	Ching Cheung-gim	
2011	Wax and Wane	Chan Yat-chung	
2011	The Other Truth	Tam Wai-tung	
2012–2013	Friendly Fire	Kam Pou Cheung	
2013	Sergeant Tabloid	Lui Tsan Nam	
2013	A Change of Heart	Yip Sai-gau	
2013	Bounty Lady	Heung Sing-nam	
2014	Outbound Love	Tse Wan-fung	
2014	Line Walker	Chum Foon-hei	
2014	The Great Doctor An Daoquan		
2014	The Last Emperor	Shanqi	
2015	Destined to Love You		
2016	Come with Me	Liu Chun-cheung	
2017	Line Walker: The Prelude	Chum Foon-hei	
2017	My Ages Apart	Lui Chun	
2018	Guardian Angel 2018 Web Drama	Fong Chi-keung	Shaw Brothers Web Drama
2019	The Defected	Chief Superintendent Kan Kwok-chu	
2020	Line Waker: Bull Fight	Chum Foon-hei	
2021	Armed Reaction 2021	Wai Chin-chiu	
2024	The Heir to the Throne		
2025	The Narcotic Operation		
2025	Justice Is Mine		
2026	Themis	Hung See-yee	
