= Princess and the Seven Kung Fu Masters =

2013 Hong Kong film by Wong Jing and Venus Keung

- Film poster

Chinese name
- Traditional Chinese: 笑功震武林
- Simplified Chinese: 笑功震武林
Transcriptions
Standard Mandarin
- Hanyu Pinyin: Xiào Gōng Zhèn Wǔ Lín
Yue: Cantonese
- Jyutping: Siu3 Gung1 Zun3 Mou2 Lam4
- Directed by: Wong Jing; Venus Keung
- Screenplay by: Wong Jing
- Produced by: Wong Jing
- Starring: Sammo Hung; Sandra Ng; Ronald Cheng; Eric Tsang; Wong Cho-lam; Xie Na; Natalie Meng; Kimmy Tong; Rose Chan; Philip Ng; Yuen Wah; Jo Kuk
- Cinematography: Venus Keung
- Edited by: Li Ka-wing
- Music by: Lincoln Lo
- Production companies: See Movie; Mega-Vision Pictures; Bona Film Group; Zhujiang Film Group
- Distributed by: Mega-Vision Pictures
- Release date: 28 February 2013
- Running time: 94 minutes
- Country: Hong Kong
- Languages: Cantonese; Mandarin
- Box office: HK$3,184,910

Princess and the Seven Kung Fu Masters (Chinese: 笑功震武林; pinyin: Xiào Gōng Zhèn Wǔ Lín; Jyutping: Siu3 Gung1 Zun3 Mou2 Lam4) is a 2013 Hong Kong martial arts action comedy fantasy film directed by Wong Jing and Venus Keung, featuring an ensembled cast include Sammo Hung, Sandra Ng, Ronald Cheng, Eric Tsang, Wong Cho-lam, Xie Na, Natalie Meng, Kimmy Tong, Rose Chan, Philip Ng, Yuen Wah, and Jo Kuk.

The film was released in Hong Kong on 28 February 2013 and in China on 8 March. It received mixed reviews from critics.

== Plot ==
During the early years of the Republic of China, civil unrest and foreign incursions plunge the population into severe hardship. In the Northeast, Lucky Star Town remains a peaceful sanctuary, serving as a refuge for seven retired martial arts masters who have abandoned their volatile pasts for civilian lives. This group includes the Taoist priest Chanting Bing, the tailor Little Tailor, the brothel madame Manuelle, the vendor Little Trumpet, a three-children raised neighbor named Manysons, the restaurant owner Madonna, and her sister, the chef Mademoiselle Hong. While shopping at the Lucky Star Town market, Cheryl Lin – the daughter of warlord Lin – accidentally meets Little Tailor, which sparks a romantic connection between the two despite their differing social classes, after which Cheryl returns to her family estate unaware of the townspeople's true identities.

In elsewhere, a faction of Chinese patriots consisting of Qin Hao, Howard Luo, Terry Chen, and Janice Fang arrives in the Northeast. Their mission is to infiltrate and seize classified Japanese military documents detailing espionage networks and invasion plans to deliver them to the revolutionary liberation forces. The final member of their team, Tony Luo, is scheduled to rendezvous with them two days later. Meanwhile, the Tiger Den – a ruthless assassination syndicate led by the Japanese operative Kiyoko Kurosawa and the formidable Hong siblings include Tiger, Leopard, and Phoenix – conspires to manipulate and bribe Warlord Lin to serve their agenda.

During a night raid, the patriots successfully infiltrate the syndicate's headquarters and retrieve the documents, but they are discovered by Tiger Den forces. A violent confrontation ensues, and due to the overwhelming combat prowess of the Hong siblings, Howard, Terry, and Qin are killed in action. Janice, the sole survivor, escapes but is struck by Kiyoko's poisoned dart. Exhausted and weakened, she collapses outside warlord Lin's estate. Cheryl discovers Janice and secretly moves her to her bedroom for medical aid to evade her father, who nevertheless observes his daughter's suspicious behavior. Cheryl then smuggles Janice to Lucky Star Town, where Bing, Manysons, Little Tailor, Little Trumpet, and Manuelle pool their inner martial arts energy to purge the toxin and save Janice's life.

That same night, Tony Luo arrives at Lucky Star Town in search of his comrades. Upon returning home, Cheryl discovers that Kiyoko has disguised herself as an elite guest to assassinate her father. Warlord Lin discovers the deception too late; he orders his daughter to flee while he single-handedly fights off Kiyoko and the Hong siblings. Lin is eventually subdued by Kiyoko, who paralyzes him with a poison needle to the neck and uses a hypnotic spell to turn him into a political puppet to facilitate a forced marriage alliance. Cheryl is pursued by assassins in the forest but is rescued by Tony, who defeats her pursuers and escorts her back to Lucky Star Town. Janice regains consciousness and reunites with Tony.

Tony requests the assistance of the seven masters to dismantle the Tiger Den alongside himself, Cheryl, and Janice. The masters initially refuse, fearing the destruction of Lucky Star Town's peace and citing their own past trauma and losses. In response to the growing resistance, Kiyoko dispatches eighteen iron-skinned, masked assassins from the Black Wind Clan to wipe out the village. The following morning, as Tony's group prepares to leave, the Black Wind Clan ambushes them but is entirely wiped out by the combined forces of Tony and the seven masters. Kiyoko then appears and uses illusions to disguise herself as Bing and Madonna to sow confusion. To expose the imposter, Manysons tricks the fake Chanting Bing into singing a specific song that the real masters do not know, and then passionately kisses the real Madonna. Enraged, Kiyoko launches a fatal poison strike, Manysons shields Madonna with his body, succumbing to his injuries after confessing his love and leaving his assets to her. Devastated by his death, the remaining six masters and Tony's team launch a retaliatory assault on the Tiger Den headquarters to disrupt the forced wedding between Lin and Kiyoko.

At the stronghold, the unified forces neutralize the syndicate's henchmen, while Little Tailor uses his inner energy to extract the poison needle from Lin, restoring his consciousness. In the ensuing battles, Bing confronts Tiger; Madonna, Little Trumpet, Little Tailor, and Manuelle collaborate to defeat Phoenix, with Little Tailor hanging Phoenix from a ceremonial pillar using a wedding silk ribbon; and Tony stabs Leopard in the back with an axe, killing him. Upon recovering, Lin strips Tiger of his iron boots and stomps on him repeatedly before allowing Tony to deliver the final blow using the exact technique Tiger had used to kill Howard.

Kiyoko flees into the forested garden and uses an earth-burrowing stealth technique to hide underground. However, guided by Cheryl's tactical suggestion, the six masters use spiritual awareness to locate Kiyoko and launch a coordinated subterranean assault. Forced above ground, Kiyoko is hit by a decisive, fatal kick from Lin that hurls her against the stronghold doors. Before dying, she throws two poisoned darts at Lin, which he evades. The projectiles fly toward Cheryl, but Little Tailor intercepts them to protect her. Although onlookers initially believe he has been fatally struck, Little Tailor reveals he caught the darts unharmed with his bare hands. In the aftermath, Tony and Janice bid farewell to the town to continue their revolutionary campaign with the liberation forces, while the town returns to its peaceful routine, cementing the romantic bonds formed during the conflict.

== Cast ==
- Sammo Hung as Warlord Lin
- Sandra Ng as Madonna
- Ronald Cheng as Little Trumpet
- Eric Tsang as Manysons
- Wong Cho-lam as Little Tailor
- Xie Na as Mademoiselle Hong
- Natalie Meng as Manuelle
- Yuen Wah as Chanting Bing
- Philip Ng as Tony Luo
- Kimmy Tong as Cheryl Lin
- Rose Chan as Janice Fang
- Jo Kuk as Kiyoko Kurosawa
- Xing Yu as Tiger Hong
- Mo Meilin as Leopard Hong
- Jiang Luxia as Phoenix Hong
- Timmy Hung as Terry Chen
- Dennis To as Howard Luo
- Xu Minghu as Qin Hao
- Wen Chao as young villager

== Reception ==
Andrew Chan of the Film Critics Circle of Australia writes, "The result is easily winning the audience attention through some truly funny gags and quality kung fu on display."

Princess and the Seven Kung Fu Masters earned HK$3,184,910 at the Hong Kong box office.
