= Line Walker =

Hong Kong TV series

- Promotional Poster
- Also known as: The Apostle
- 使徒行者
- Genre: Modern; Police procedural; Crime; Action; Thriller
- Created by: Jazz Boon
- Written by: Ng Lap Gwong 伍立光; Leung Si Gwan 梁絲鈞; Yeung Wing Ying 楊詠瑩; Chu Chi 朱智; Pong Si Kit 龐士傑; Hor Ching Yi 何靜怡; Lee Hui Yi 李慧儀; Wong Siu Long 黃小龍; Choong Ching Long 鍾正龍
- Starring: Michael Miu; Charmaine Sheh; Raymond Lam; Sharon Chan; Benz Hui; Elena Kong; Sammy Sum; Oscar Leung; Toby Leung
- Theme music composer: Alan Cheung Ka Shing
- Opening theme: "Walker" 行者 by Justin Lo and Wilfred Lau
- Ending theme: "Love Is Not Easy" 越難越愛 by Jinny Ng
- Composer: Damon Chui
- Country of origin: Hong Kong
- Original language: Cantonese
- No. of episodes: 31

Production
- Executive producer: Tommy Leung 梁家樹
- Producer: Jazz Boon 文偉鴻
- Production location: Hong Kong
- Editors: Yip Tin Sing 葉天成; Leung Yan Dong 梁恩東; Ng Lap Gwong 伍立光
- Camera setup: Multi camera
- Running time: 45 minutes
- Production company: TVB

Original release
- Network: Jade; HD Jade
- Release: 25 August – 3 October 2014

Related
- Line Walker: The Prelude (2017); Line Walker: Bull Fight (2020)

Line Walker
- Chinese: 使徒行者
Transcriptions
Standard Mandarin
- Hanyu Pinyin: shǐ tú xíng zhě
Yue: Cantonese
- Yale Romanization: si tòuh hàhng jé
- Jyutping: si3 tou4 hang4 ze2

Line Walker (Chinese: 使徒行者 literally "Apostle Walker") is a 2014 Hong Kong crime thriller drama produced by TVB, starring Michael Miu, Charmaine Sheh and Raymond Lam as the main leads, with Sharon Chan, Benz Hui, Elena Kong, Sammy Sum, Oscar Leung and Toby Leung in major supporting roles. It is the first entry in the franchise.

The drama began broadcasting on August 25 to October 3, 2014, on TVB Jade channel during its 9:30–10:30 p.m. timeslot. In 2022, the drama was selected as one of ten classic TVB dramas being honoured for a new joint Youku and TVB programme.

== Plot ==
Set in Hong Kong, the drama follows the lives of Hong Kong Police's CIB undercover police agents who must live a double life in secrecy. Not knowing when they can return to their normal life, they must also endure the constant fear of being uncovered by those they are assigned to infiltrate. However, this time their lives are put in danger when it is discovered that a mole lives within the police force.

Cheuk Hoi (Michael Miu) is a Chief Inspector of Police (CIP) in Hong Kong Police's Criminal Intelligence Bureau (CIB) unit. He is a righteous supervisor that will resort to unofficial tactics in order to restore the identities of his undercover subordinates who have gone missing and deemed by the police department to have strayed to the criminal side. When he finds his friend Hong To Hang, a fellow Superintendent of Police (SP) in the CIB unit, thrown off a building under mysterious circumstances, he learns from Hong's dying words that there are moles within the police force working for the triads. In order to protect the lives of his five undercover agents, Hong has deleted their files from the police database, erasing their identities as police officers. Hong charges Hoi with the task of finding each lost undercover agent, but dies before he can tell Hoi any further information. Remembering Hong's warning against trusting anyone in the police force, Hoi keeps Hong's last words hidden from his superiors. Instead, he sets out on his own to find Hong's five undercover agents.

With clues left behind by Hong, Hoi finds undercover agent Ting Siu Ka (Charmaine Sheh) who fronts as an owner of a foot massage parlor, and assumes his role as her new handler. Siu Ka's only assignment under Hong was to gather intelligence but Hoi assigns her the task of helping him find the other four undercover agents. Siu Ka decides to get close to Sit Ka Keung (Raymond Lam), nicknamed Bao Seed who is part of an illegal gambling gang. He fronts as an ice deliveryman but is actually in charge of collecting unpaid gambling debts. Siu Ka previously clashed with Bao Seed and his partner Muk Sut when they went to her shop to collect a gambling debt but becomes friendly with them because she knows of their connection to a major triad organization.

Meanwhile, Kobe Lin Ho Kan (Sammy Sum), another undercover agent working for Hong, fronted as a crooked stock broker in order to go to prison and get close to triad boss Chum Foon Hei as the last assignment he received from Hong, but Foon Hei soon proved to be a cunning target. Unable to gain any traction with Foon Hei, Kobe believed he had failed his assignment. However upon Kobe's release from prison, Foon Hei asks Kobe to join his organization. In order for Kobe to follow through with his undercover assignment, Kobe sacrifices his relationship with ICAC officer Mok Sin Yan (Sharon Chan), who is unaware that Kobe is an undercover agent.

Yan investigates Hoi because she suspects that he is a dirty cop with connections to the triads because of his fast raise in the police force and all the cases he is assigned to as the Chief inspector gets foiled. With Yan tracking his every single move, it makes things complicated for Hoi to meet up with the undercover agents. In order to keep one step ahead, Hoi bugs Yan's personal belongings and overhears her personal life. Accidentally he discovers the abusive marital life of Yan's older sister Katie Mok Sin Ching (Elena Kong). While helping Katie to escape her abusive life, the two begin to get closer and eventually begin a relationship.

As Siu Ka continues to work with Bao Seed on missions for Foon Hei, she begins to develop feelings for Bao Seed. It is eventually revealed that Bao Seed is another undercover sent out by Hong. As the 3 undercover agents work together with Hoi, they start to suspect their handler is the mole; however, the 4th undercover, Ada (Skye Chan), was revealed and explained to them her relationship with Hong and Hong's intentions.

When Foon Hei's son dies from the karma of his bad deeds, Foon Hei began to change for the better. Hoi begins to suspect Yip Siu-leung (Patrick Tang) as the mole in the police force. Kobe warns Yan to be careful. At first Yan dismisses Kobe's warning as an act of jealousy; however, she decides to investigate on her own and finds evidence to confirm Hoi's suspicions. Siu-leung eventually finds Yan investigating him. Hurt and enraged, he decides to kill Yan who is saved by Kobe when he tackles Siu-leung off the roof of a building.

== Cast ==
=== Main cast ===
Cast	Role	Description	Age
Michael Miu 苗僑偉	Cheuk Hoi (Cheuk Sir) 卓凱 (卓Sir)	Police's Criminal Intelligence Bureau (CIB); Chief Inspector of Police (CIP); Then he is promoted to CIB Superintendent of Police (SP); Police Handler for undercover agents Katie Mok Sin-ching Boyfriend later Husband	42
Charmaine Sheh 佘詩曼	Ding Siu-ka (Ding Jie) 丁小嘉 (釘姐)	Hung Ying Triad Leader after Sit Ka Keung; Police Constable (PC); Undercover Agent; Owner of a foot massage parlour Foster Daughter of Rose Fung, Nancy Lau and Susie Choi; Sit Ka Keung's Girlfriend	30
Raymond Lam 林峯	Sit Ka-keung (Bao Seed) 薛家強 (爆Seed)	Hung Ying Triad Leader after Foon Her Gor; Police Constable (PC); Undercover Agent; Ting Siu Ka Boyfriend	30
Sharon Chan 陳敏之	Mok Sin-yan, Yan 莫羨昕	Independent Commission Against Corruption (ICAC) Principal Investigator; Sister of Katie Mok Sin Ching; Kobe / Lin Ho-kan Girlfriend	29
Benz Hui 許紹雄	Chum Foon-hei (Foon Hei Gor) 覃歡喜 (歡喜哥)	Hung Ying Triad Leader; Former CIB Inspector of Police (IP); Shot in episode 25	55
Sammy Sum 沈震軒	Lin Ho-kan / Kobe 連浩勤	Police Constable (PC); Undercover Agent; Stock Broker; Mok Sin Yan Boyfriend	30
Elena Kong 江美儀	Mok Sin-ching, Katie 莫羨晴	Senior Public Prosecutor of the Department of Justice (DOJ); Sister of Mok Sin Yan; Ex-wife of Richard Cheung Wing-kuen; Become Cheuk Hoi's Wife	35
Oscar Leung 梁烈唯	Cheung Muk-wing (Muk Sat) 張木榮 (木蝨)	Sit Ka-keung good friend	28
Toby Leung 梁靖琪	Chiu Mei-yin (Yin Chai) 趙美賢 (賢仔)	CIB Inspector of Police (IP); Niece of Cheuk Hoi	22

=== Supporting cast ===
==== Hung Ying triad society ====
- Eddie Pang 彭懷安 as Yau Tat-fu 游達富, also known as "Taat Sa" (Flounder) 撻沙.
- Eddie Law 羅天池 as Lok Wai-na (Rottweiler) 洛威拿.
- Eddie Ho 何偉業 as Gwai Wong Chiu 鬼王超.
- Akai Lee 李啟傑 as Lee Kai-shing 李繼承, also known as "Chicken Shing" 雞成.
- Owen Cheung 張振朗 as Ah Fo "Fire" 阿火
- Vincent Lam 林偉 as Chai Fing 猜Fing.
- Kitterick Yiu 姚浩政 as Ah Gau "Dog" 阿狗.
- Otto Chan 陳志健 as Cheung Yung 張勇
- Kelvin Lee 李興華 as Tat-fu's gang member 游達富之下屬
- Choco Ip 葉家泓 as Tat-fu's gang member 游達富之下屬

==== Criminal Intelligence Bureau (CIB) ====
- Lau Kong 劉江 as Kwok Hok-wah 郭學華, Chief Superintendent of Police (CSP) and head of CIB and dirty cop.
- Jimmy Au 歐瑞偉 as Hong To-hang 康道行, CIB Superintendent of Police (SP).
- Skye Chan 陳倩揚 as Ada Tse On-yee 謝安儀, ICAC Investigator and undercover Police Constable. K
- Nicole Wan 尹詩沛 as Yeung Wing-sze 楊詠絲, CIB officer
- Kelvin Chan 陳建文 as Pong Tsz-kit 龐志傑, CIB officer
- Lau Tin Lung 劉天龍 as Ng Wai-kwong 伍偉光, CIB officer

==== Organized Crime and Triad Bureau (OCTB) ====
- Patrick Tang 鄧健泓 as Marco Yip Siu-leung 葉兆良, OCTB Chief Inspector of Police (CIP), becomes CIB Superintendent of Police (SP) in episode 18 and dirty cop.
- Raymond Tsang 曾守明 as Lee Yat-shan 李日山
- Jayden Kau Cheuk-nang 裘卓能 as Ching Yik-hei 程亦熙
- Edgar Lam 林健生 as Mak Tsz-kit 麥子健
- Leung Yan 梁茵 as Chung Chi-nei 鍾芷妮
- Chloe Nguyen 阮兒 as Fung Ka-ling 馮嘉玲

==== Independent Commission Against Corruption (ICAC) ====
- Miguel Choi 蔡康年 as Ko Chin-nang 高展能
- Mak Ka Lun 麥嘉倫 as Law Chun-yip 羅俊業
- Moses Cheng 鄭詠謙 as Man Yan-chung 文仁松
- Ng Kwong Lei 吳曠利 as Chow Lok-hei 周樂晞

==== Foot Massage parlour ====
- Mary Hon 韓馬利 as Rose Fung Wai-fong 馮慧芳, Ting Siu-ka's Foster Mother.
- Rosanne Lui 呂珊 as Nancy Lau Mei-ying 劉美鶯, Ting Siu-ka's Foster Mother.
- Ceci So 蘇恩磁 as Susie Choi Siu-lin 蔡笑蓮, Ting Siu-ka's Foster Mother.

==== Thai Mafia ====
- KK Cheung 張國強 as Sung Kam 崇金
- Ankie Beilke 貝安琪 as Amrin On Lam 安琳
- Yuang Cheung 章宇昂 as Ah Yum 阿鑫

==== Mr Song Society ====
- Chung King-fai 鍾景輝 as Chin Shui-on 錢瑞安, former Hong Kong Secretary of Security, mastermind behind Mr. Song's group.
- Stephen Huynh 黃長興 as James Pong Yin Ting 龐彥廷.
- Samantha Ko 高海寧 as Amy Lam Hei-mei 林希微, Undercover Agent and later turned black cop.
- Sam Tsang 曾航生 as Kelvin Lok Kei 骆祺, a barrister who represents dirty cops and Mr Song's group members.
- Law Lok-lam 羅樂林 as Keith Kwok Teng 郭正, Director of Public Prosecutions inside Department of Justice, and one of the masterminds of Mr Song's group.

==== Others ====
- Ken Law 羅浩銘 as Ah Tong 阿棠
- Kenneth Fok 霍健邦 as Ying Ka-moon 刑家滿
- Doris Chow 周麗欣 as Ho Wan-ying 何韵
- Steven Ho 何啟南 as Richard Cheung Wing-kuen 張永權
- Gemma Choi 蔡慧欣 as Richard Cheung's mistress 張永權之情婦
- Alvin Lau 劉彥夆 as Chum Long Sing 覃朗星

== Development and casting ==
- The sales presentation clip was filmed in October 2013. The original 57 second clip featured Michael Miu, Charmaine Sheh, Raymond Lam, Sharon Chan, Elena Kong, Sammy Leung and KK Cheung. The sales presentation clip was unveiled on November 7, 2013, for 2014 drama sales pitch.
- Movie king Tony Leung Ka-fai was originally cast in the drama, but had to withdraw due to a rib injury sustained during filming of Horse Play. A whole new script was written as a result.
- Costume fitting was held on February 28, 2014.
- The blessing ceremony took place on February 28, 2014, 2:00 p.m. at Tseung Kwan O TVB City
- Sammy Leung was originally cast to play the role "Lin Ho Kan", but had to withdraw during the middle of filming for health reasons. Sammy Sum replaced him, while Patrick Tang took on Sammy Sum's original role "Yip Siu Leung". With Sammy Sum taking over the role of "Lin Ho Kan", Sharon Chan had to re-film scenes with Sammy Sum that she had already filmed with Sammy Leung which caused production to be pushed back for a month.
- Joe Ma was rumoured to have been offered the role of "Lin Ho Kan". Once it was confirmed that the role was given to Sammy Sum, Joe released a statement on his Weibo account and stated during an interview with a reporter that he had turned down the role because "it was not fitting" for him. However, producer Man Wai Hung later clarified that he never contacted Joe about the role and did not understand where such a rumour came from.
- On March 18, 2014, while filming a motorcycle scene, Sammy Sum fell and landed on his right hand which resulted to a wrist fracture. Medical attention was required and Sum was admitted to the hospital for surgery on March 21. Filming was delayed by a few weeks while Sum recovered.
- On March 24, 2014, an extended trailer of the drama was previewed at FILMART 2014.

== Reception ==
The series has received overwhelming critical acclaim since its release particularly for the suspenseful plot, buzz-generating episodes, performances by the casts, and direction. It is also one of the highest rated TVB series of the year, and is the most watched TVB drama of the year. The click rate of this drama has hit 2 billion online in Mainland China, breaking the record of Triumph in the Skies 2 and becoming the highest click rate TVB drama in Mainland China. The series has won Singapore's Media Favourite Series in StarHub TVB Awards 2014, Most Favourite Series in TVB Star Awards Malaysia 2014 and Best Drama in Hong Kong's TVB 48th Anniversary Awards 2014.

The starring cast also won multiple awards for their performances in this drama. Charmaine Sheh was highly praised for her role as "Ting Siu Ka" (丁小嘉). She won both Best/Favourite Actress and My Favourite TV Character at the TVB Anniversary Awards 2014, the TVB Star Awards Malaysia 2014 and the StarHub TVB Awards 2014 in Singapore. This is her second time to be crowned double TV Queen of the year at the TVB Anniversary Awards. The character "Chum Foon Hei" (覃歡喜) was very liked by the audience and "Foon Hei Gor" (歡喜哥) has become a new nickname for Benz Hui. He won My Favourite TV character in Hong Kong and in Malaysia. At Singapore's TVB award show, he won My Favourite Supporting Actor. Other cast members, like Raymond Lam, Michael Miu, Sharon Chan and Sammy Sum were also awarded at the different TVB Award shows. The subtheme "Love Is Not Easy" (越難越愛), sung by Jinny Ng, won the first Most Popular Series Song at the TVB Anniversary Award.

The series' success has led to two TV sequels and two spinoff movies.

== Viewership ratings ==
Week	Episodes	Date	Average Points	Peaking Points
1	1–5	August 25–29, 2014	25	28
2	6–10	September 1–5, 2014	27	28
3	11–15	September 8–12, 2014	27	31
4	16–20	September 15–19, 2014	29	33
5	21–25	September 22–26, 2014	28	30
6	26–29	September 29 – October 2, 2014	29	35
7	30–31	October 3, 2014	30	35

== Awards and nominations ==
TVB Anniversary Awards 2014

- Best Drama (won by 61.90%)
- Best Actress: Charmaine Sheh (won by 78.60%)
- My Favourite Female Character: Charmaine Sheh as Ting Siu Ka 丁小嘉 (75171 votes)
- My Favourite Male Character: Benz Hui as Chum Foon Hei 覃歡喜 (62705 votes)
- Most Popular Series Song: "Love Is Not Easy" 越難越愛 by Jinny Ng (42935 votes)
- Nominated – Best Actor: Michael Miu (Top 15)
- Nominated – Best Actor: Raymond Lam (Top 15)
- Nominated – Best Supporting Actor: Benz Hui (Top 15)
- Nominated – Best Supporting Actor: Oscar Leung (Top 15)
- Nominated – Best Supporting Actress: Sharon Chan (Top 15)
- Nominated – Best Supporting Actress: Elena Kong (Top 15)
- Nominated – My Favourite Male Character: Michael Miu (Top 15)
- Nominated – My Favourite Male Character: Raymond Lam (Top 15)

(No Top 3 or Top 5 were announced)

TVB Star Awards Malaysia 2014

- Most Favourite Drama
- Most Favourite Leading Actress: Charmaine Sheh
- Most Favourite Supporting Actor: Benz Hui
- Most Favourite Supporting Actress: Sharon Chan
- Most Favourite Improved Actor: Sammy Sum
- Most Favourite Improved Actress: Samantha Ko
- Most Favourite Theme Song: "Love Is Not Easy" 越難越愛 by Jinny Ng
- Top 15 Favourite TV Characters: Charmaine Sheh as Ting Siu Ka 丁小嘉
- Top 15 Favourite TV Characters: Michael Miu as Cheuk Hoi 卓凱
- Top 15 Favourite TV Characters: Raymond Lam as Sit Ka Keung 薛家強
- Top 15 Favourite TV Characters: Benz Hui as Chum Foon Hei 覃歡喜
- Top 15 Favourite TV Characters: Sharon Chan as Mok Sin Yan 莫羨昕
- Nominated – Most Favourite Leading Actor: Raymond Lam (Top 3)
- Nominated – Most Favourite Supporting Actress: Elena Kong (Top 12)
- Nominated – Most Favourite Supporting Actor: Oscar Leung (Top 12)
- Nominated – Most Favourite On-Screen Couple: Raymond Lam and Charmaine Sheh (Top 3)

Singapore StarHub TVB Awards 2014

- My Favourite TVB Actress: Charmaine Sheh
- Top 6 Favourite TVB Female Characters: Charmaine Sheh as Ting Siu Ka 丁小嘉
- Singapore Media's Favourite TVB Drama
- Nominated – My Favourite TVB Drama
- Nominated – My Favourite TVB Actor: Michael Miu
- Nominated – My Favourite TVB Supporting Actor: Oscar Leung
- Nominated – My Favourite TVB Male TV Characters: Raymond Lam (Top 12)

Yahoo！Asia Buzz Awards 2014

- Searched Popularity Award TV Drama
- Searched Popularity Award TV Actress: Charmaine Sheh
- Searched Popularity Award Male Artist: Benz Hui

Taiwan TVBS

- The Most Favourite Hong Kong Drama 2014

Huading 15th Awards 2015

- Best Chinese Actor in a TV Series: Raymond Lam
- Best Chinese Actress in a TV Series: Charmaine Sheh

Weibo's Star 2014

- Weibo's Powerful TV Drama
- Hong Kong Top 10 Hot Topic: 9th Place
- Weibo's Powerful TV Female Character: Charmaine Sheh as Ting Siu Ka 丁小嘉
- Weibo's Powerful On-Screen Couple: Charmaine Sheh (as Ting Siu Ka 丁小嘉) and Raymond Lam (as Sit Ka Keung 薛家強)
- Weibo's Powerful TV Theme Song: "Love Is Not Easy" 越難越愛 by Jinny Ng
