= Mission Milano =

2016 Chinese-Hong Kong film by Wong Jing

- Poster
- Chinese: 王牌逗王牌
- Directed by: Wong Jing
- Written by: Wong Jing
- Produced by: Andy Lau; Wong Jing; Lee Ah-ping
- Starring: Andy Lau; Huang Xiaoming; Shen Teng; Wong Cho-lam; Michelle Hu; Nana Ou-yang
- Cinematography: Venus Keung
- Edited by: Li Ka-wing
- Music by: Ronald Ng
- Production companies: Gravity Pictures Film Production; Shanghai Aimei Entertainment; China Film Group Corporation; Hongkong Star Dynasty; Flagship Entertainment Group; Infinitus Entertainment; Dongyang Yixing Media; Yatai Weilai Entertainment (Beijing) 微影时代影业无锡有限公司; Dadi Shidai Media (Beijing); Omnijoi Media Corporation; HG Entertainment; Beijing Baidu Nuomi Information Technology; Yinli Entertainment International iQiYi Pictures
- Distributed by: Gravity Pictures Film Production; Wuzhou Film Distribution; Tianjin Huyu Times Technology; Beijing Baidu Nuomi Information Technology; China Film Group Corporation
- Release date: 30 September 2016 (China)
- Running time: 103 minutes
- Countries: China; Hong Kong
- Language: Mandarin
- Box office: CN¥198.4 million

Mission Milano (Chinese: 王牌逗王牌) is a 2016 action adventure comedy film written and directed by Wong Jing, who co-produced with Andy Lau. A Chinese-Hong Kong co-production, the film stars Andy Lau, Huang Xiaoming, Shen Teng, Wong Cho-lam, Michelle Hu and Nana Ou-yang. It was released in China on September 30, 2016.

== Synopsis ==
Rogue terrorists steal the revolutionary invention, the Seed of God, for world domination. After Interpol agent Sir Sampan's underhanded tactics to recruit young billionaire Luo, the team rallies to rescue and retrieve their prized invention.

== Cast ==
Name	Role
Andy Lau	as Sir Sampan Hung
Huang Xiaoming	as Louis Luo
Wong Cho-lam	as Amon
Michelle Hu	as Phoenix
Nana Ou-Yang	as Karen Luo / Luo Ka-yan
Fung Bo Bo (credited as Petrina Bo Bo Fung)	as Mrs. Luo
Wu Yue	as Iron Hawk
Evonne Hsieh (credited as Sie Yilin)	as Sophia
Mao Junjie	as woman in black
Xu Dongdong	as Snow
Shen Teng	as KK
Zhao Yingjun	as Bing Bing
Qi Wei	as Tina

== Reception ==
The film has grossed CN¥198.4 million at the Chinese box office.
