= Line Walker: Bull Fight =

Hong Kong TV series

- Promotional Poster
- Also known as: Line Walker 3 (使徒行者3)
- Genre: Modern; Crime; Action; Thriller
- Starring: Raymond Lam; Michael Miu; Kenneth Ma; Benjamin Yuen; Mandy Wong; Priscilla Wong; Sisley Choi; Owen Cheung; Benz Hui
- Opening theme: "Oblivious" (無人問我) by Raymond Lam
- Ending theme: "Can't Let You Go" (不能放手) by Hana Kuk; "Feels Like Heaven" (低谷天堂) by Raymond Lam & Hana Kuk
- Countries of origin: Hong Kong, China
- Original languages: Chinese (Cantonese, Mandarin)
- No. of episodes: 37

Production
- Producer: So Man Chung
- Production location: Hong Kong
- Production company: TVB

Original release
- Network: Tencent Video; TVB Jade
- Release: 9 November – 27 December 2020

Related
- Line Walker (2014); Line Walker: The Prelude (2017)

Line Walker: Bull Fight (Chinese: 使徒行者3), also known as Line Walker 3, is a 2020 crime drama produced by Tencent Penguin Pictures and TVB. It serves as the sequel season to both Line Walker (2014) and Line Walker: The Prelude (2017). It stars Raymond Lam, Michael Miu, Kenneth Ma, Benjamin Yuen, Mandy Wong, Priscilla Wong, Sisley Choi, Owen Cheung and Benz Hui.

Line Walker: Bull Fight premiered on 12 October 2020 on myTV Gold, TVB Anywhere, Tencent Video and Astro Go. For myTV Gold and TVB Anywhere, the first eight episodes are uploaded on 12 October and two episodes are uploaded on every Monday, Tuesday and Wednesday afterwards. For Tencent Video and Astro Go, two episodes are uploaded on every Monday, Tuesday and Wednesday starting from 12 October. The series premiered on 9 November 2020 on TVB Jade in Hong Kong.

== Synopsis ==
Set in Hong Kong, China, four years after the events in Line Walker, Sit Ka Keung (Raymond Lam) continues to work as a Hong Kong Police Criminal Intelligence Bureau (CIB) undercover officer, while Cheuk Hoi (Michael Miu) opens a coffee shop after being released from prison. CIB Chief Inspector Cheung Kei Gee (Mandy Wong) suspects Cheuk of joining the triad and investigates him. The Security Bureau establishes Security Intelligence Agency (SIA), a new intelligence department. The principal investigator of SIA, Wai Chok Wing (Kenneth Ma) invites Tsui Tin Tong (Benjamin Yuen) to join SIA. Chum Foon Hei (Benz Hui), who was thought to be killed by Seed, returns to Hong Kong to track down the leader of an international crime organization, Eternity. The true identity of Wai is later revealed to be Ngai Tak Lai, the younger paternal half-brother of Victor Ngai Tak Shun...

== Cast and characters ==
=== Main cast ===
Cast	Role	Description
Raymond Lam	Seed (爆Seed) / Sit Ka Keung (薛家強)	CIB undercover agent. Former leader of Hung Ying triad. Owner of Ho Yee Tao Foot Massage Spa. After his undercover mission in Thailand, he briefly reunited with Ting Siu Ka and opened Ho Yee Tao Foot Massage Spa. He is assigned to become an undercover agent handler and later becomes a CIB Inspector of Police (IP). See Line Walker for more details.
Michael Miu	Cheuk Sir / Cheuk Hoi (卓凱)	Former CIB Superintendent of Police (SP), a brilliant strategist. Katie Mok Sin-Ching's husband. After his release from prison, he becomes a target of CIB 's investigations. He later helps Pong Ho Yueng to become the leader of Sung Luen, on the premise that Sung Luen will go legitimate. Leads an outside special task force organised by Madam Chan to investigate corrupt police officers. In the last episode, Cheuk returns to CIB as a consultant. See Line Walker and Line Walker: The Prelude for more details.
Kenneth Ma	Wai Chok Wing (韋作榮) / Klein Ngai Tak Lai (魏德禮) Dickson Yu as young Ngai Tak Lai.	Younger half-brother of Victor Ngai Tak Shun. Groomed by his grandfather, Ngai Cheung Hing. Takes on the identity of the deceased Wai Chok Wing. Principal Investigator of the Security Intelligence Agency (SIA). See Security Bureau for more details. Used hypnosis to forget his identity as Ngai Tak Lai to sneak into SIA. Developed feelings for Madam G since she was in university. Leader of Eternity. See Line Walker: The Prelude for more details.
Benjamin Yuen	Tsui Tin Tong (徐天堂)	Former CIB undercover. Represented Hong Kong Police as an Interpol member. Senior investigator of the SIA. Joined upon an invitation from Ngai / Wai. Forges a relationship with So Miu Miu in order to investigate her father, So Sir. Mui's fiancé from Episode 35. See Line Walker: The Prelude for more details.
Mandy Wong	Madam G / Cheung Kei Gee (章紀孜) Stephanie Au as young Cheung Kei Gee	CIB Chief Inspector of Police (CIP). Has an obsession with elevators. Diagnosed with savant syndrome and Asperger syndrome since she was young. Her father abused her as a child. Speaks bluntly and is unaware of the others' feelings, until she re-encounters Ngai / Wai.
Priscilla Wong	Cheng Shuk Mui (鄭淑梅)	Former CIB undercover. A well-known journalist, creating documentaries around the world. Helps Cheuk gather evidence. Tsui's fiancé from Episode 35. Died in Episode 35 from poison that was secretly injected into her as ordered by Ngai / Wai. See Line Walker: The Prelude for more details.
Sisley Choi	Dau (阿兜) / Dau Nga Hei (竇亞希)	CIB undercover agent. Assigned to the Kum Poh Lor online casino to take down the Sung Luen triad. Develops feelings for Pong and later becomes his girlfriend.
Owen Cheung	Pong Ho Yeung (龐浩洋)	God-son of Wai Kit. Strives to take back the leadership of Sung Luen triad, which Kit founded. Dau's Boyfriend.
Benz Hui	Chum Foon Hei (覃歡喜) / Yaya Furaha	Former CIB Inspector of Police (IP). Former CIB undercover officer. Former leader of Hung Ying triad. Thought to be killed by Seed four years ago, he fled to another country and runs a counterfeit passport business. Returns to Hong Kong using a new identity, Yaya Furaha. Investigating Eternity, an international criminal organization, possibly related to Cheung Hing. See Line Walker and Line Walker: The Prelude for more details.

=== Supporting cast ===
Cast	Role	Description
Tony Hung	Wong Wing Cheung (王永翔)	CIB undercover who investigated Tsui in 2009. Died in 2010 in an explosion in Bangkok. See Line Walker: The Prelude for more details.
Shiga Lin	Luen (阿攣) / Cheung Yuk Huen (張玉瑄)	CIB undercover who investigated Tsui in 2009. Died in 2010 in an explosion in Bangkok. See Line Walker: The Prelude for more details.
Elena Kong	Katie Mok Sin Ching (莫羡晴)	Cheuk Hoi's wife. Senior public prosecutor of the Department of Justice (DOJ). Died in episode 8 from liver failure. See Line Walker for more details.
Emily Kwan	Madam Chan / Chan Lai Kwan (陳麗群)	Senior Assistant Commissioner of Police (SACP). Organised a secret team consisting of Cheuk, Madam G and Officer Leung to expose Officer So’s corrupt things.
Geoffrey Wong	Leung Sir / Leung Kin Pong (梁健邦)	Chief Superintendent of Police (CSP). Head of CIB.
Kelvin Yuen	Officer Lui / Lui Hap Sing (呂合星)	Chief Inspector of Police (CIP) in the Organized Crime and Triad Bureau (OCTB). Stepfather of Ching Chik, Seed's son.
Joseph Lee	Officer So / So Tsz On (蘇子安)	Deputy Secretary of Security Bureau. Established SIA in order to replace CIB. He was arrested for corruption. In episode 37, he was diagnosed with cancer in its late phases.
Sophie Yip	So Miu Miu	Officer So's daughter. Killed by Officer So accidentally.
Serene Lim	Lam Lam (藍楠)	Malaysian Dit Da practitioner. Becomes a masseuse at Ho Yee Tao after she is found to practice Dit Da without a license. Develops feelings for Seed and takes care of his son, Ching. Dies after being shot by officers whilst fleeing with Seed in Episode 36.
Anthony Ho	Mui Sze Kwai (梅小貴)	Staff member at Ho Yee Tao. Runs the store like he is the owner, often telling Seed to do chores.
Lee Shing-cheong	Wai Kit (韋傑)	Founder of Sung Luen triad. Godfather of Pong. Father of the deceased Wai. Imprisoned for thirty years after Cheuk's arrest. Initially believes that Cheuk killed his son Wai. Asks Cheuk to assist Pong to win the leadership of Sung Luen.
Kent Cheng	Sun Chi Kin (辛志堅) / Kin(堅哥)	One of the founders of the Cheung Hing triad. Tried to revive Cheung Hing. But in fact, was trying to retrieve Cheung Hing's secret to control the rich and powerful of Hong Kong.
Akina Hong	Wendy Cheung Kei Wan (章紀泓)	Madam G's elder sister. Runs The Core, a big data analytics company. Works for Eternity, who has been funding The Core.
Milkson Fong	Gor Bo-Lam / Goblin (哥布林) / Lam Po-Gor (林寶剛)	One of Cheuk’s prison mates. Later works at Cheuk’s coffee shop. Dies trying to protect Cheuk in Episode 36.
Penny Chan	Lee Man-Hung (李文雄) / Bird Poo (雀屎)	Member of the Criminal Intelligence Bureau (CIB) . Used to be an undercover under Cheuk. See Line Walker: The Prelude for more details.
Otto Chan	Ngai Jing-Feng	Subordinate of Ngai Tak-Lai / Wai Chok-Wing. Took over as Eternity's leader after Ngai Tak-Lai / Wai Chok-Wing's hypnosis. Killed by Ngai Tak-Lai / Wai Chok-Wing in Episode 24.
Joseph Zeng	Yan Tin-Hup (殷天俠) / Madman	Subordinate of Ngai Jing-Feng. Undercover agent of the New Zealand Police. Shot by Ngai Tak-Lai / Wai Chok-Wing in Episode 24. Revealed to be faking his identity as an undercover agent in the last Episode.

=== Other supporting cast ===
Cast	Role	Description
Mayanne Mak	Juicy Chu Sin (朱倩)	Bao Seed's undercover agent. Died in episode 2 because of Dr. X, who took out her organs.
FAMA	Prostitution clients	-
Eddie Koo	Hon Kin-Yi (韓建義) / Dr. X	Owner of Kangyi Medical Centre. Head of an international organ trafficking organization. Kills Juicy Chu in episode 2. Arrested in episode 6. Sentenced to life imprisonment in episode 8.
Mimi Kung	Fanny Fan Hiu-Wah (范曉華) / Madam Fan	Chief Superintendent of Police (CSP) and head of the Police's Commercial Crime Bureau (CCB). Wife of Yam Sir.
Savio Tsang	Yam Sheung-Yu (任尚宇) / Yam Sir	Chief Superintendent of Police (CSP) and head of the Police's Complaints and Internal Investigations Branch (C&IIB). Husband of Madam Fan.
Bowie Cheung	Lindy Kwong Mei-Lin (鄺美蓮)	Lui Hap-sing's deceased wife and Ching Chik's deceased mother. Bao Seed's girlfriend but broke up with him after he joined the triad.
Oscar Leung	Cheung Muk-Wing (張木榮) / Muk-sut (木蝨)	Bao Seed's deceased friend. See Line Walker for more details.
Brian Tse	Tat Q	A gang member in Fook Wo. Died in Line Walker: The Prelude.
Bob Lam	Kam Tin (金田)	An izakaya owner. CIB undercover agent.
Harriet Yeung	Kam Tin's wife	-
John Au	Secretary for Security	Minister of the Security Bureau.
Wilson Tsui	Prisoner	Paid by Ngai Tak-Lai / Wai Chok-Wing to hurt Wai Kit. Secretly interrogated by Cheuk Hoi in the prison hospital to tell who paid him to hurt Wai Kit.

=== Cameos ===
Cast	Role	Description
Zheng Kai	The Painter	Hitman for the Triads. Currently serving a life sentence in prison. Claims to know Ting Siu-Ka's location and wants Bao Seed to get him out of prison. Appeared in the first and final episodes.
Michael Tse	Unnamed Sniper	Sniper that killed Ngai Tak-Lai / Wai Chok-Wing. Appeared in the final episode.
Philip Keung	Bingo	Kidnapped Madman and claimed to know his real identity. Crossover character from The Defected and appeared in the final episode.
Ron Ng	Foot massage customer	-
Matt Yeung	Foot massage customer	-
