= From Vegas to Macau II =

2015 Hong Kong-Chinese film by Wong Jing

- Film poster
- Directed by: Wong Jing
- Written by: Wong Jing
- Produced by: Andrew Lau; Connie Wong
- Starring: Chow Yun-fat; Nick Cheung; Carina Lau; Shawn Yue; Angela Wang; Michelle Hu
- Cinematography: Andrew Lau; Cho Man-keung
- Edited by: Azrael Chung
- Music by: Chan Kwong-wing; Chen Zhiyi
- Production companies: Mega-Vision Project Workshop; Bona Film Group; Sun Entertainment Culture; Shaw Brothers Pictures; Media Asia Film Production
- Distributed by: Media Asia Group
- Release date: 19 February 2015
- Running time: 110 minutes
- Countries: Hong Kong; China
- Languages: Cantonese; Mandarin; Thai
- Box office: US$156.85 million (China)

From Vegas to Macau II
- Traditional Chinese: 賭城風雲II
- Simplified Chinese: 赌城风云II
Transcriptions
Standard Mandarin
- Hanyu Pinyin: Dǔchéng Fēngyún II
Yue: Cantonese
- Jyutping: dou2 sing4 fung1 wan4 II

From Vegas to Macau II (賭城風雲II) is a 2015 3D action comedy film directed and written by Wong Jing and starring Chow Yun-fat, Nick Cheung, Carina Lau, Shawn Yue, Angela Wang and Michelle Hu. A Hong Kong-Chinese co-production, the film is the sequel to From Vegas to Macau. The third installment of the series, From Vegas to Macau III was released on February 8, 2016.

== Cast ==
- Chow Yun-fat as Ken / Ko Chun
- Nick Cheung as Mark
- Carina Lau as Molly
- Shawn Yue as Vincent
- Angela Wang as Yan, Mark's daughter
- Michelle Hu as Purple, Aoi's assassin
- David Chiang as Victor
- Kimmy Tong as Rainbow
- Philip Keung as Ma Tai-fat
- Wu Yue as Aoi's enforcer that fought Vincent
- Jin Qiaoqiao as Aoi
- Kenny Wong as Ben, Interpol police
- Derek Tsang as Interpol police
- Connie Man as Jackie, Interpol police
- Rebecca Zhu as Interpol police
- Samantha Ko as Aoi's enforcer
- Jacky Cai as Aoi's enforcer that fought Mark
- Ken Lo as Muay Thai Champ Rymi
- Treechada Petcharat as Thai casino boss
- Candy Chang as Aoi's enforcer with a crossbow
- Bella Lo as Victor's daughter
- Julio Acconci as Do Min-shui, Molly's companion
- Hazel Tong as Interpol police
- Dominic Ho as Interpol police
- Wang Zizi as Aoi's enforcer that fought Mark
- Jolie Fan as casino dealer for Victor's charity

=== Guest stars and cameos ===
- Yuan Quan as Mark's wife
- Natalie Meng as mahjong cheater
- Eric Tsang as Yen Ji-dan
- Natalis Chan as Champ
- Wong Jing as Smartie (uncredited)
- Felix Lok as Mr. Hon
- Aman Chang as Jiang
- Andy Lau as Michael "Little Knife" Chan from God of Gamblers

== Critical response ==
James Marsh of the British magazine Screen International gave the film a negative review, writing, "The result is a noticeable step down in quality from last year's offering" and "Much of the comedy throughout the film also falls flat."

== Box office ==
As of March 2015 the film has grossed US$157 million in China.

The film opened at No. 2 at the Chinese box office behind Dragon Blade earning US$29 million in its opening weekend ($43.1 million from Thursday to Sunday) which is higher than its predecessor's opening weekend gross. It topped the box office in its second weekend with US$69.8 million (up 58%). In its third weekend, the film fell to No. 2 earning US$27.4 million while Hollywood's animated film, Big Hero 6 took the top spot.
