= From Vegas to Macau III =

2016 Hong Kong film by Andrew Lau and Wong Jing

- Official film poster

Chinese name
- Traditional Chinese: 賭城風雲III
- Simplified Chinese: 赌城风云III
Transcriptions
Standard Mandarin
- Hanyu Pinyin: Dǔ Chéng Fēng Yún Sān
Yue: Cantonese
- Jyutping: Dou2 Sing4 Fung1 Wan4 Saam1
- Directed by: Wong Jing; Andrew Lau
- Screenplay by: Wong Jing
- Produced by: Wong Jing; Andrew Lau; Connie Wong
- Starring: Chow Yun-fat; Andy Lau; Nick Cheung; Li Yuchun; Jacky Cheung; Carina Lau
- Cinematography: Andrew Lau; Cho Man-keung
- Edited by: Azrael Chung
- Music by: Chan Kwong-wing; Chen Zhiyi
- Production companies: Mega-Vision Project Workshop; Bona Film Group; Media Asia Films; Sun Entertainment Culture; Shaw Brothers Pictures; China Star Entertainment Group; Infinitus Entertainment
- Distributed by: Gala Film Distribution; Intercontinental Film Distributors (HK); Bona Film Group (China)
- Release dates: 6 February 2016 (Hong Kong); 8 February 2016 (China)
- Running time: 112 minutes
- Country: Hong Kong
- Language: Cantonese
- Budget: US$40 million
- Box office: US$182.6 million

From Vegas to Macau III (賭城風雲III) is a 2016 Hong Kong action comedy film directed by Andrew Lau and Wong Jing and starring Chow Yun-fat, Andy Lau, Nick Cheung and Li Yuchun, with special appearances by Jacky Cheung and Carina Lau. The film is the third and final installment of the From Vegas to Macau series and entire of God of Gamblers franchise. The film was released on 6 February 2016 in Hong Kong and on 8 February 2016 in China.

== Plot ==
The film starts with the ending of From Vegas to Macau II, where cardshark Ken's lifelong lover-nemesis, Molly, skydives without a parachute from her private jet. She now appears to be trapped inside some sort of laser bubble — unconscious, naked and horribly airbrushed — while her admirer, mad scientist JC, fumes about making Ken pay within his lair underneath Paradise Island, off the coast of Thailand.

In Macau, Ken is busy having a meltdown over the wedding of the century of his daughter Rainbow to his godson Vincent. To help him snap out of it, his friend Mark hypnotizes him into thinking Vincent is marrying his fat cousin. Things go very wrong when Michael, the disciple of Ko Chun, phones in a warning to beware of JC, who has sent an explosive robot that looks like Michael to kill Ken. An explosion during the wedding causes both Rainbow and Vincent to each fall into a coma, while Ken and Mark are accused to have taken DOA's illicit money. Enraged, Ken swears to seek vengeance and to pursue the mastermind who has entangled them in his evil plans.

Ken and Mark end up in prison, a convenient venue for them to play a card game using cigarettes as chips (so technically, it is not gambling), but are then abruptly rescued from a criminal raid and take refuge in Michael's home in Singapore. Michael's place serves as a cost-effective location for a lengthy stretch, while a gaggle of characters drop in and out to deliver gags. These range from a demonstration of wonky weapons by an expert to a cake-throwing match. Two romantic arcs unfold — one between Ken's C-3PO doppelganger robot, Stupido, and Michael's fembot, Skinny; the other a love triangle involving Michael, Ko's younger sister Ko Fei and Mark.

When JC finally arrives to exact revenge, he challenges Ken and his friends to a game of table tennis. He later invites them to a "charity" mahjong, dice and three-person card game from China (called "Fighting the Landlord") event at a hall in the island resort on Paradise Island. A host of cameos are trotted out, including Psy of "Gangnam Style" fame, who is then escorted out of the hall. After the games, sleeping gas is released into the hall, causing Ken and the guests to pass out.

Ken and his friends sneak into a warehouse under the hall, where they battle JC's mercenaries and four robots. Stupido and Skinny, who fly all the way to the resort, save them and defeat the robots, but are heavily damaged in the process. Michael encounters nine tough androids, who attack him, but he tricks them, and Only Yu arrives with Interpol officers, pressing a large button that forces the androids to dance and then self-destruct. Ken confronts JC in the latter's lair, and JC electrocutes him with a baton and a gauntlet on his right arm, destroying his laboratory in the process. Molly awakens from her laser bubble and calls JC, allowing Ken to defeat JC. As she dies in Ken's arms, JC watches and dies as well.

== Cast ==
- Chow Yun-fat as Ken Shek (石一堅) / Ko Chun, the God of Gamblers (賭神高進)
- Andy Lau as Michael "Dagger" Chan, the Knight of Gamblers (賭俠陳刀仔)
- Nick Cheung as Mark (馬尚風)
- Li Yuchun as Ko Fei (高菲)
- Jacky Cheung as JC (易天行) (special appearance)
- Carina Lau as Molly (莫愁) (special guest appearance)
- Charles Heung as Lung Ng (龍五) (guest star)
- Shawn Yue as Vincent (阿樂) (guest star)
- Psy (guest star) as Mr. Wong
- Angela Wang as Ma Cho-yat (馬初一) (guest star)
- Jacky Heung as Lung Sap-ng (龍十五)
- Michelle Hu as Purple (紫衣)
- David Chiang as Victor (偉哥)
- Law Kar-ying as Only Yu
- Kimmy Tong as Rainbow (石彩虹)
- Elena Kong as Miss Ice
- Philip Keung as Ma Tai-fat (馬大發)
- Derek Tsang as Interpol police
- Maria Cordero as Prison guard
- Ng Chi-hung as Big Brother B
- Lo Hoi-pang as Mahjong King
- Yuen Qiu as Mahjong Queen
- Raquel Xu as Dice Queen
- Jacquelin Chong as Interpol police
- Grace Wong as Interpol police
- King Kong Lee as King Black of Jiufen
- Hanjin Tan as prisoner
- Terence Siufay as prisoner
- Tony Ho as prisoner
- May Chan as Ken's cousin
- Iris Chung as Iris
- Anita Chui
- Wong Jing as prisoner being shot to death

== Production ==
Filming started in August 2015. The film features returning cast members Chow Yun-fat, Nick Cheung and Carina Lau reprising their roles from the previous installment, alongside new cast members Andy Lau, whom reprises his role as "Michael Chan" from the God of Gamblers film series, and Jacky Cheung as the new film's main antagonist. In addition to reprising his role as "Ken Shek" in the previous installments, Chow will also reprise his role as "Ko Chun" from the aforementioned film series.

== Box office ==
In China, From Vegas to Macau III opened simultaneously with The Mermaid and The Monkey King 2 and recorded an opening day gross of US$26.9 million.

== Reception ==
Variety described the film as "a gambling caper with model 'Chinese Socialist characteristics,' meaning there's hardly any gambling or any other naughty fun at all." and credited the film to "Single-handedly killing a once internationally beloved, one-of-a-kind Hong Kong genre that Wong himself invented", noting that Wong Jing and Andrew Lau had "mangled their material to suit mainland criteria that they’re left with a string of moronic gags barely held together by cheapskate production values."
