= The House of No Man (1999 film) =

1999 Hong Kong film by Soi Cheang

- Film poster
- Traditional Chinese: 摩登姑婆屋
- Directed by: Cheang Pou-soi
- Written by: Cheung Ngan-Man
- Story by: Cheang Pou-soi
- Produced by: Yeung Yat-Tak ( 楊逸德); Dennis Chan Yiu-Wa (陈耀华); Small Siu (士摩萧)
- Cinematography: Ng Wing-Sin (吴永善); Mak Hoi-Man (麥海文)
- Edited by: Exclamation (本名)
- Music by: Leung Chi-wa (梁志華)
- Production company: CUHK Film Studio
- Release date: October 15, 2003 (Hong Kong)
- Running time: 81 minutes
- Country: Hong Kong
- Language: Cantonese

The House of No Man (Chinese: 摩登姑婆屋) is a 1999 Hong Kong drama film. It was directed by Soi Cheang Pou-Soi and produced by Yeung Yat-Tak.

== Plot ==
Three women, career-minded Ada, playgirl Candy and novelist Gigi, choose to live together in a house on the beach. Life ends up drawing them in different directions.

== Cast ==
- Zuki Lee as Ada
- Joe Ma as Eric Ma
- Wong So-ying (黃素瑩)
- Raymond Cho as Hoi / Sea Monster
- Wong So-Bik (黃素璧) as Gigi
- Irene Tang (鄧凱珊) as Candy
- Jenny Yam (任港秀) as Anita
- Jacky Wong Cheung-Bo (王章寶)
- Chow Au-Ming (周藝明)
- Chan Cho-Kin (陳楚鍵)

== Production ==
This was one of three films shot by Cheang on digital video in 1999 before he began working with higher-quality cameras.

== Release ==
The film had a theatrical run from October 15 to October 21, 1999. The film was given a II A rating.
