= Wan Kwong =

Hongkonger singer (born 1944)

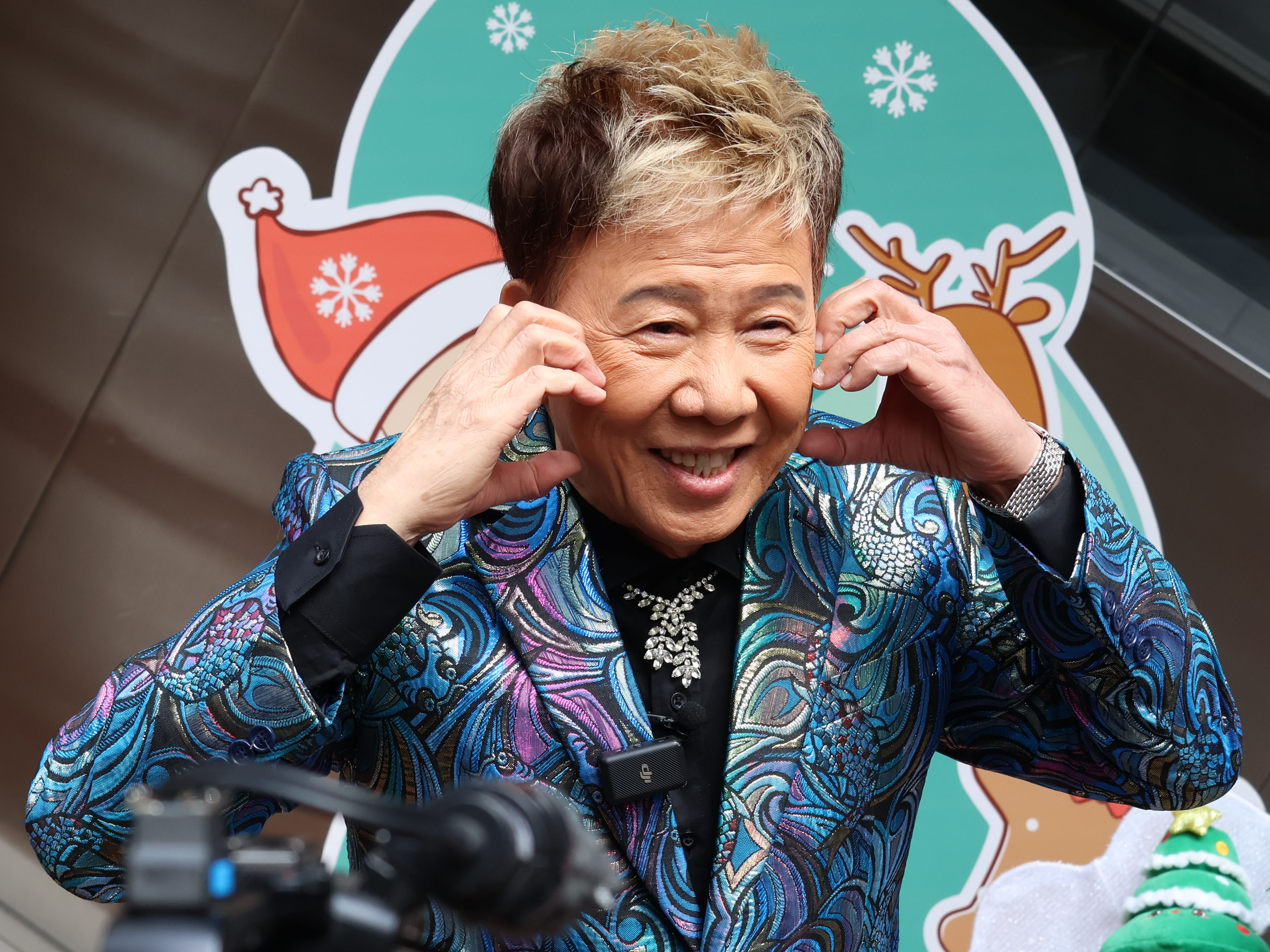
- Wan Kwong in 2024
- Born: 23 August 1944 (age 82); Cholon, Saigon, French Indochina
- Occupations: Cantonese opera singer, actor
- Years active: 1960s – present

Chinese name
- Chinese: 尹光
Transcriptions
Standard Mandarin
- Hanyu Pinyin: Yǐn Guāng
Yue: Cantonese
- Jyutping: Wan5 Gwong1

Jackson Wan Kwong (Chinese: 尹光), born Lữ Minh Quang (Chinese: 呂明光), is a Vietnamese-born Hong Kong singer and actor, nicknamed "the Temple Street Prince."

Wan was born in Cholon, Saigon in 1949 to a Cantonese Vietnamese family and was trained as a Cantonese opera singer. Wan left South Vietnam for British Hong Kong with his family as the Vietnam War heated up. From the 1960s to the 1980s, he switched to pop songs, whose lyrics, often in vulgar language, reflected the lives of the Hong Kong working class. Around the 1990s, he collaborated with other senior singers in Hong Kong, singing in pubs and on TV shows. He released an album called Ignoring Father (少理阿爸) in 2002 and still holds concerts occasionally.

== Discography ==
- Hollywood Grand Hotel (荷里活大酒店)
- Counting Hair (數毛毛)
- The Fortune Teller Tai Tset Sai (相士大隻西)
- Ignoring Father (少理阿爸)
- Chasing the Dragon (追龍)
