= From Vegas to Macau =

2014 Hong Kong-Chinese film by Wong Jing

- Official poster

Chinese name
- Traditional Chinese: 賭城風雲
- Simplified Chinese: 赌城风云
Transcriptions
Standard Mandarin
- Hanyu Pinyin: Dǔ Chéng Fēng Yún
Yue: Cantonese
- Jyutping: Dou2 Sing4 Fung1 Wan4
- Directed by: Wong Jing
- Written by: Wong Jing
- Produced by: Andrew Lau
- Starring: Chow Yun-fat; Nicholas Tse; Chapman To; Jing Tian
- Cinematography: Ng Man-Ching; Cho Man-Keung
- Edited by: Azrael Chung
- Music by: Chen Zhiyi
- Production companies: Mega-Vision Pictures; Television Broadcasts Limited; Bona Film Group; Golden Pictures Entertainment; Sun Entertainment Culture
- Distributed by: Mega-Vision Pictures; Bona Film Group
- Release dates: 30 January 2014 (Hong Kong); 31 January 2014 (China)
- Running time: 93 minutes
- Countries: Hong Kong; China
- Languages: Cantonese; Mandarin; Portuguese
- Box office: US$95.9 million (international)

From Vegas to Macau (Chinese: 賭城風雲), also known as The Man From Macau (Chinese: 澳門風雲), is a 2014 crime comedy film directed by Wong Jing. A Hong Kong-Chinese co-production, the film stars Chow Yun-fat, Nicholas Tse, Chapman To and Jing Tian. The film was released during 2014 Chinese New Year.

A sequel titled From Vegas to Macau II was released on 19 February 2015.

== Plot ==
Benz, his son "Cool" and nephew Ngau-Ngau are part of a team of vigilantes who rob gangsters at night and distribute the loot to the needy. However, his wife is suffering from cancer and knows nothing of their activities. Unbeknownst to all of them, Benz's stepson Lionel, a police officer, is on a deep undercover assignment as an employee of a multinational company called DOA. It is later revealed that DOA is merely the corporate front of a large criminal syndicate and is run by the ruthless Mr. Ko. Lionel, who had a camera implanted onto a contact lens which he wore so the police could track the syndicate's activities and eventually nab them.

Meanwhile, Benz reunites with his old friend Ken, known as the "Magic Hand". Ngau-Ngau becomes infatuated with Ken's daughter Rainbow and is determined to win her affection, even though Ken eventually makes it known that he prefers "Cool" to date his daughter and Rainbow repeatedly rebuffs Ngau-Ngau's efforts. Lionel realizes his cover has been blown and hides the contact lens in a stuffed teddy bear at home without his family's knowledge. Ngau-Ngau gives the bear to Rainbow when he and "Cool" visit Ken's house. Mr. Ko sends an assassin to Lionel's flat, only to find Benz, who has just returned home. Benz is beaten and tortured and ends up in a coma while Lionel's body is found later, also bearing torture marks.

Police detectives from China, Hong Kong and Macau decide to enlist the help of Ken to take down the wily and cunning Mr. Ko. Ken challenges Mr. Ko to a gambling match in hopes of provoking him into making a mistake. During the match he discovers that DOA's assassins have attacked his house and Rainbow, "Cool" and Ngau-Ngau are inside.

Rainbow is put inside a glass tank, which has gas in it. During the match, Ken reveals that he had undergone surgery to implant a card sensor into his fingernail which allows the details of a certain card to be fed into his brain. The people following Mr. Ko start a revolution against him after watching Lionel Messi of Barcelona score against Real Madrid, winning them. After killing them all, Mr. Ko tries finding Ken. Ken starts shooting cards in retaliation. "Cool", is revealed to be wearing the mask of one of Mr. Ko's crew, whom had secretly diverted the ship back towards the waters, which police are now making their way to. While making their way towards the top, "Cool" and Rainbow meets the Assassin. "Cool" and the Assassin fight, which "Cool" ends him off with a few punches to his face, making him look like a duck.

Mr. Ko starts to escape, only to be met by Ken. Ken now mercilessly shoots cards at Mr. Ko, striking him multiple times. Mr. Ko is later subdued by him, and arrested by the police.

While Ken is doing the disciple rituals with "Cool" on the first day of the Lunar New Year at his place, "Cool" receives a call from a mysterious someone, who also shows interest to take Cool as his disciple. Ken questions Cool who is more qualified to impart his skills to him. At this moment, the doors swing open. A man in his black suit, playing with his jade ring walks into the scene. "I believe I am qualified to take him as my disciple." This man was no other than God of Gamblers Ko Chun (from the God of Gamblers series) himself.

== Cast ==
- Chow Yun-fat as Ken 石一坚 / "God of Gamblers Ko Chun" 赌神高进
- Nicholas Tse as Cool 晒冷 "冷竟"
- Chapman To as Ngau-Ngau 牛必勝 "牛牛"
- Jing Tian as Detective Luo Xin
- Kimmy Tong as Rainbow 阿彩
- Philip Ng as Lionel
- Gao Hu as Mr. Ko
- Annie Wu as Susan
- Benz Hui as Benz
- Zhang Jin as DOA's bodyguard/assassin
- Michael Wong as Detective
- Sammy Sum as Ken's enforcer
- Tony Ho as Mr. Ko's enforcer
- Maria Cordero as Siu Wan
- Wong Man-wai as Benz's wife
- Philip Keung as Ma Sheung-fat
- Winnie Leung as Mr. Ko's female enforcer
- Candy Yuen as Mr. Ko's female enforcer
- May Chan as Ken's cousin
- Wong Chun-tong as Brother Man
- Yu Chi-ming as Uncle Wah
- Natalie Meng as Ngau-Ngau's fake wife
- Michelle Hu as Mr. Ko's female enforcer
- Philippe Joly as Mr. Ko's American delegate
- Roberto Losada as undercover Macau Police

== Production ==
The film's blessing ceremony press conference was held on 28 July 2013 at TVB City where it was attended by the cast alongside Mega-Vision Pictures representatives director Wong Jing and producer Andrew Lau, Television Broadcasts Limited production manager Virginia Lok, Polybona Films CEO Yu Dong, Golden Pictures Entertainment representative Yun Chi Yuen and Sun Entertainment Culture representative Paco Wong. Production started immediately after. The film's premise will be set in Macau.

== Box office ==
The film grossed RMB24.8 million (US$4.09 million) in its opening day in China, with a total opening gross of US$12.5 million. It had grossed a total of RMB523,490,000 (US$84,570,000) in China at the end of its run. In Hong Kong, it has grossed a total of HK$33,557,657 (US$4,324,184). It earned a total of US$95.9 million internationally.

== Sequel ==
The sequel From Vegas to Macau II was released in 2015 with Chow Yun-fat and Kimmy Tong reprising their roles as Ken and Rainbow. Nick Cheung replaced Nicholas Tse as Chow's new protégé and Carina Lau also joined the cast.
