= Flaming Butterfly =

Flaming Butterfly (Chinese: 火蝴蝶) is a drama series produced by Hong Kong broadcaster Asia Television. It was the first series to be filmed in High Definition by ATV. The series consisted of 40 1-hour episodes, but 21 of them were re-edited into 90-minute episodes, making it the second "Drama90" series to be aired by ATV. As a result of, the episode count was reduced to 31. The series was sold to MediaCorp TV, with each episode running for 1 hour, instead of 90 minutes.

== Cast ==
=== The Fok Family ===
- Fok Hong Kay (霍鴻基, portrayed by Lo Hoi Pang (盧海鵬))
- Fok Sum Yi (霍心儀, portrayed by Rain Li (李彩樺))- After her family's fall from wealth, she worked as an actress to support her siblings. Never a successful actress, she eventually married Cheung Hock Yu, and became a powerful businesswoman.
- Fok Sum Yen (霍心思, portrayed by Monie Tung (董敏莉))
- Fok Sum Ngai (霍心毅, portrayed by William Chow (周子濠))

=== The Cheung Family ===
==== The Elders ====
- Cheung Shou Yen (章守仁, portrayed by Kenneth Tsang (曾江))
- Cheung Shou Yi (章守義, portrayed by Lee Long Kay (李龍基))
- To Shou Ha (陶秀霞, portrayed by Lee Fong Sing (李鳳聲))
- Lam Cho Wen (藍楚雲, portrayed by Lou Ying Hong (柳影虹))

==== Second Generation ====
- Cheung Hock Lim (章學廉, portrayed by Jim Ping Hei (詹秉熙))
- Cheung Hock Yu (章學儒, portrayed by Michael Tong (唐文龍))
- Chris Cheung (章學禮, portrayed by Anson Leung (梁俊一))
- Cheung Hock Fong (章學風, portrayed by Chan Siu Ha (陳少霞))
- Cheung Hock Ying (章學盈, portrayed by Chan Yin Hang (陳彥行))

== Synopsis ==
The series began with the conclusion of a court case, which ruled that Cheung Hock Yu, having been missing since his kidnapping three years ago, is legally dead. His wife, Fok Sum Yi, did not accept the ruling, and disappeared later that evening, leaving behind a letter with the lyrics of Old Black Joe written on it.

The series flashed back to the 80s. It was revealed that Fok Sum Yi came from a wealthy family that later lost all its wealth in a stock market crash. Sum Yi’s father commits suicide after losing his fortune. In order to support her siblings, Sum Yi became a television actress. However, she endured many hardships and humiliation and never attained true success in the field. She eventually reunites with her first love Cheung Hock Yu. Sum Yi and Hock Yu marry despite objections from Hock Yu’s family.

Through wit and manipulation, Sum Yi was able to win the Cheung family over, and climbed the corporate ladder to become one of the key figures in the Cheung’s family business. While Sum Yi gained wealth and power, the romance between her and her husband faded, and she also made many enemies in the business world, which led to Hock Yu's kidnapping.

Police caught the kidnapper and the kidnapper stated how Hock Yu attempted to escape with a gunshot wound and fell off a cliff. This made Sum Yi believe that if she didn’t prolong the money exchanging process and gave the money right away, Hock Yu wouldn’t have to go through so much pain. As the police didn’t find Hock Yu’s body, just his blood-stained shirt, they suggested that Hock Yu's body might have been eaten by animals, or washed away due to heavy rain.

Sum Yi refuses to believe her husband is dead until a body is found. Eventually, rivals within the Cheung family had Hock Yu declared dead, so that his fortunes can be distributed. The Cheung family was happy that Sum Yi was left out of the will. However, a provision in the will left Hock Yu's entire fortune to Sum Yi, if she can prove she still has her wedding ring in her possession. Stunned to see Sum Yi still holding on to the ring as a necklace, she was able to inherited Hock Yu's massive fortunes.

Just as she inherited the wealth, she disappeared from the Cheung residence, and returned to her childhood playhouse to rediscover her childhood memories. She looked at the beautiful scenery and enjoys the peace. Suddenly she hears a knock. Shocked and stunned to see who was at the door, she cried as she is reunited with her husband.
