= Ciao UFO =

2019 Hong Kong film by Patrick Leung

- Theatrical release poster
- Traditional Chinese: 再見UFO
- Jyutping: Zoi^{3} Gin^{3} UFO
- Directed by: Patrick Leung
- Written by: Amy Chin; Kong Ho-yan
- Produced by: Amy Chin; Bonnie Wong
- Starring: Chui Tien-you; Charlene Choi; Wong You-nam
- Cinematography: Leung Ming-kai
- Edited by: Derek Hui; Joe Zhou; To To
- Music by: Tsui Chin-hung
- Production companies: Sun Pictures; Icon Group
- Distributed by: Golden Scene
- Release dates: 29 October 2019 (HKAFF); 19 March 2026 (Hong Kong)
- Running time: 121 minutes
- Country: Hong Kong
- Language: Cantonese
- Budget: HK$15 million

Ciao UFO (Chinese: 再見UFO) is a 2019 Hong Kong drama film directed by Patrick Leung and starring Chui Tien-you, Charlene Choi, and Wong You-nam as a group of childhood best friends growing up together. Based on the 1985 urban legend surrounding UFO sightings at Wah Fu Estate, the story follows their lives from 1985 to 2003, tracing how they witness a UFO together as children but gradually drift apart as they grow older and pursue their own ambitions, ultimately forgetting their childhood dreams.

The film was conceptualised in 2016 as a crossover project between the boy group Shine, consisting of Chui and Wong, and the girl group Twins, consisting of Choi and Gillian Chung, to coincide with Shine's comeback concert tour. The screenplay was completed in 2017, with Patrick Leung attached as director, while Chung dropped out due to scheduling conflicts. Principal photography took place from May to August 2018, with most location shooting conducted at Wah Fu Estate. The film also features the theme song "Wah Fu One", performed by Feanna Wong.

The film had its world premiere as the opening film of the 16th Hong Kong Asian Film Festival on 29 October 2019. However, due to disputes with its distributor, the film was unable to secure a theatrical release until the distribution contract expired in 2025. It began limited preview screenings on 19 December 2025, before receiving a theatrical release in Hong Kong on 19 March 2026. The film received 10 nominations in the 44th Hong Kong Film Awards and won in five categories, including Best Film, Best Director, and Best Supporting Actress for Michelle Wai.

== Plot ==
In 1985, Kin lives in Wah Fu Estate and is best friends with his neighbours Heem and Hoyi. Heem suffers from leukemia and fears his constant medication, while Hoyi faces pressure from her parents to excel academically and become a professional. Kin's father, a sailor, teaches him stargazing and tells him stories about UFOs. Inspired, the three children dream of building a "Wah Fu One" spaceship and leaving Earth to find aliens one day. One day, Kin's father falls seriously ill during a voyage and is hospitalized in a coma. Kin, Heem, Hoyi, and Hoyi's younger brother Ho-fung go to the rooftop of Wah Fu and witness a UFO hidden among the clouds. Kin wishes for the aliens to save his father, and when he returns to the hospital, his father wakes up. However, he fails to recognize Kin and instead asks about his two daughters, revealing that he had another family in secret, before he dies. Devastated, Kin tells his friends he wishes he had never seen the UFO and learned the truth. The group drifts apart and loses contact.

In 1997, Kin has become an orphan after losing his mother soon after his father's death. Forced to leave school to support himself, he reconnects with a former classmate Yan, after she hires him to repair her computer. They grow close, and one night Yan persuades him to sneak back into their secondary school. There, she reveals that she has secretly kept the homemade stargazing device he made years earlier, which she still treasures. Kin tells her to keep it. Hoyi graduates with an accounting degree and hopes to work at the Space Museum, but is rejected since she is not from an astronomy background. She instead joins an accounting firm, though she finds the work joyless. Heem, who still believes in UFOs, appears on a television program after angrily criticizing its portrayal of alien dissections. During the interview, a scientist dismisses his claims, prompting Heem to publicly reveal that Kin and Hoyi also witnessed the UFO. However, both are too occupied with work to see the broadcast.

Kin discovers that Yan is the mistress of a billionaire after encountering some women confronting her at her apartment. Kin accepts her past and promises to support her financially. Hoping to improve his fortunes, he begins speculating in stocks based on advice from the owner of the newspaper stall where he works. However, he loses everything during the 1997 financial crisis and falls into despair. Yan later tells him she is pregnant with the billionaire's child and moving to Vancouver, but Kin does not ask her to stay. Hoyi begins dating Austin, a senior accountant at her firm. After she passes her professional exams, Austin informs her parents of their marriage plans without consulting her, believing life should follow a strict timetable. Seeing her parents delighted, Hoyi remains silent.

Before the wedding, Ho-fung helps Hoyi to locate Kin and Heem so she can invite them. He finds Heem at his family's stationery shop, where Heem reveals his leukemia has returned. Ho-fung fails to find Kin directly and instead emails every "Chan Tsz-kin" in Hong Kong. On the wedding day, Heem reunites with Hoyi and brings an old videotape of their childhood promise to travel into space together, but Austin throws it away as childish nonsense, and it forces Hoyi to reconsider the life she has chosen. During the wedding, Kin finally arrives. Together, the three friends return to the night they saw the UFO and reflect on whether they fulfilled their childhood dreams. Hoyi ultimately abandons the wedding and leaves with Kin and Heem. As the guests sit in confusion, Ho-fung takes the microphone and recounts the night the four of them saw the UFO, declaring that he still believes in aliens. Soon after the friends reunite and watch the videotape together, Heem dies from cancer, and the city begins facing the SARS outbreak.

== Cast ==
- Chui Tien-you as Kin, the son of a sailor who pursues wealth through the stock market amid Hong Kong's economic bubble of the 1990s
  - Matthew Wong as the younger version of Kin
- Charlene Choi as Hoyi, an academically accomplished girl who becomes an accountant through hard work
  - Lam Seung-yu as the younger version of Hoyi
- Wong You-nam as Heem, who has suffered from leukaemia since childhood and "lives constantly in the short term under the shadow of illness"
  - Chui Ka-him as the younger version of Heem
- Michelle Wai as Yan, Kin's high-school crush and the mistress of a billionaire
- Ng Siu-hin as Hofung, Hoyi's younger brother
  - Shawn Heung as the younger version of Hofung
- Rachel Leung as Cat, Heem's ambitious girlfriend
- Joey Leung as Austin, an accountant and Hoyi's "dullard" fiancé
- Michael Ning as Uncle, a "spaced-out" artist and the uncle of Hoyi and Hofung who "spouts Maoist anti-capitalist doctrine"
- Chu Pak-hong as Heem's brother, a pragmatic real estate agent

Also appearing in the film are Alex To as Kin's father, a sailor who secretly keeps another family outside his marriage; JJ Jia as Kin's mother; Lo Hoi-pang and Stephen Au as Heem's grandfather and father respectively; Anthony Chan as Kin's boss, a newspaper stall owner who speculates in taxi licenses; Patrick Tang as Hoyi's boss; Alfred Cheung as the curator of the Hong Kong Space Museum; Yeung Wai-lun as a job applicant at the Space Museum; and Jiro Lee and Chip Tsao as the host and guest scientist respectively of a conspiracy theory-themed television program.

== Production ==
=== Development ===
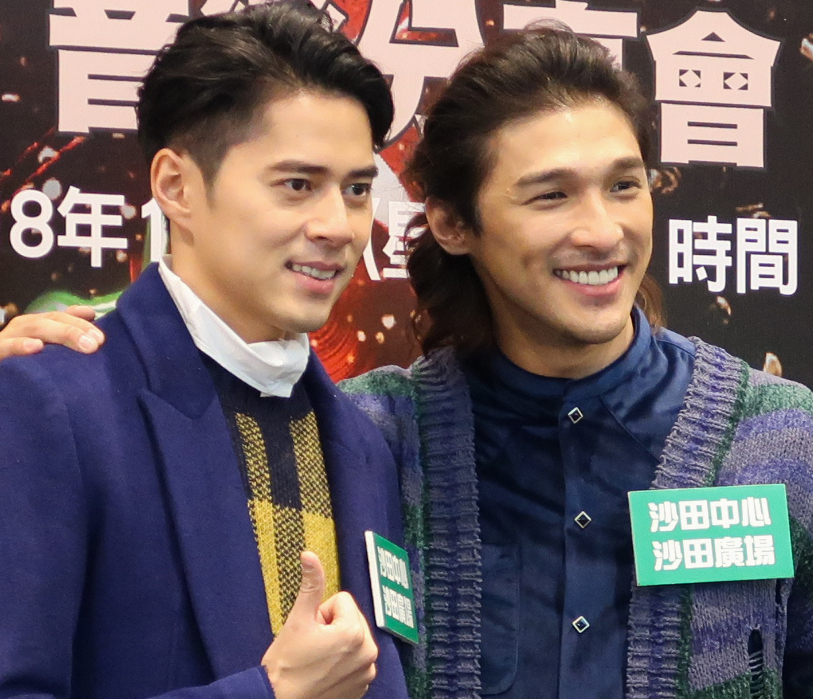
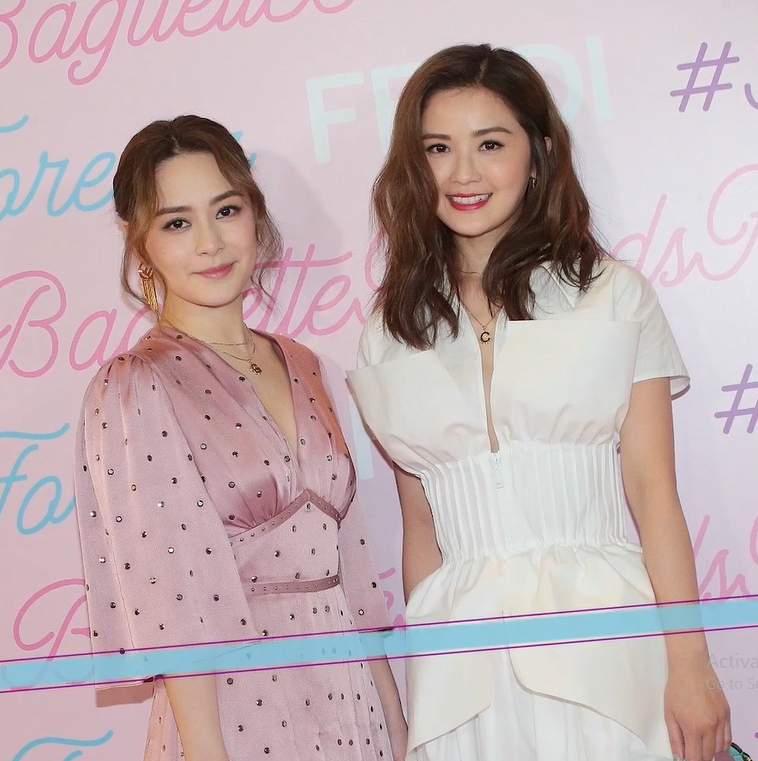
The film was envisioned as a crossover between Shine and Twins.

Film producer Amy Chin's company managed the boy group Shine (consisting of Chui Tien-you and Wong You-nam) and would plan a film project to sustain the duo's renewed popularity following their comeback concerts, beginning with their 2013 concert tour and the film The Midnight After (2014), in which they both starred. In 2016, the company planned to develop another film coinciding with their 2018 concert tour. Aiming to center the film on youths in the 1980s, Chin initially envisioned it as a crossover project between Shine and the girl group Twins (consisting of Charlene Choi and Gillian Chung). Kong Ho-yan, the screenwriter of The Midnight After, brought up the urban legends surrounding UFO sightings at Wah Fu Estate during a conversation with Chin, who thought the topic could serve as the film's central theme after conducting online research. Chin also cited a conversation with screenwriter and Hong Kong UFO Club member Jason Lam about humanity's tendency to pursue "lofty" dreams such as finding extraterrestrial life, which became the "emotional core" of the film. To research the urban legend, Kong reviewed reports of UFO sightings documented by Tuesday Report and Hong Kong Connection, while also conducting various interviews to construct the film's characters.

In 2017, after completing the screenplay, Chin sought an experienced director for the project and approached Patrick Leung, a university classmate with whom she had previously worked when Leung served as assistant director to John Woo and Chin worked in production for Woo's company Milestone Pictures. Leung initially hesitated after reading the first draft because he felt the film "lacked obvious commercial or genre-driven elements", but Chin described it as "a film for Hong Kong people" that "would never be made in the future if it was not made now", which convinced him to join the project. Leung explained that the story was largely inspired by the large-scale UFO sighting incident at Wah Fu Estate in 1985, which had even been documented by the media at the time and adapted into a documentary by RTHK, and said that he based the film on accounts provided by multiple witnesses.

Gillian Chung later withdrew from the project due to scheduling conflicts, and her role was filled by Michelle Wai, who belonged to the same talent agency. To prepare for her role as a fan of Yi Shu's novels, Wai specifically read the author's works and attempted to embody the feminine traits portrayed in them. The younger versions of the protagonists were selected from a pool of more than 100 child actors by Chin, Leung, and the assistant director, who aimed to ensure that the children's appearances and temperaments reflected those of their adult counterparts. The assistant director, who was also a parent, took care of the children during filming. Leung adopted a hands-off approach for the youngest actor, who was only around four to five years old, allowing him to behave freely on set in order to capture his "most natural and endearing" expressions. (Note: Shawn Heung was four years old at the time of filming.) The film's ending underwent constant revisions, with changes continuing until shortly before filming began, as Leung wanted the film's ending to "round up things" while Chin hoped to avoid making it feel overly preachy. According to Amy Chin, the film's original ending revealed the aftermath of Kin (played by Chui Tien-you) and Hoyi (played by Charlene Choi), where Kin travels to Malaysia to search for his paternal half-sisters, while Hoyi goes to Australia and meets a new boyfriend, who was slated to be played by singer Khalil Fong. Leung said that he had invited Fong to take on the role, but due to budget constraints preventing filming in Australia, the scene and Fong's appearance were ultimately scrapped.

=== Filming ===
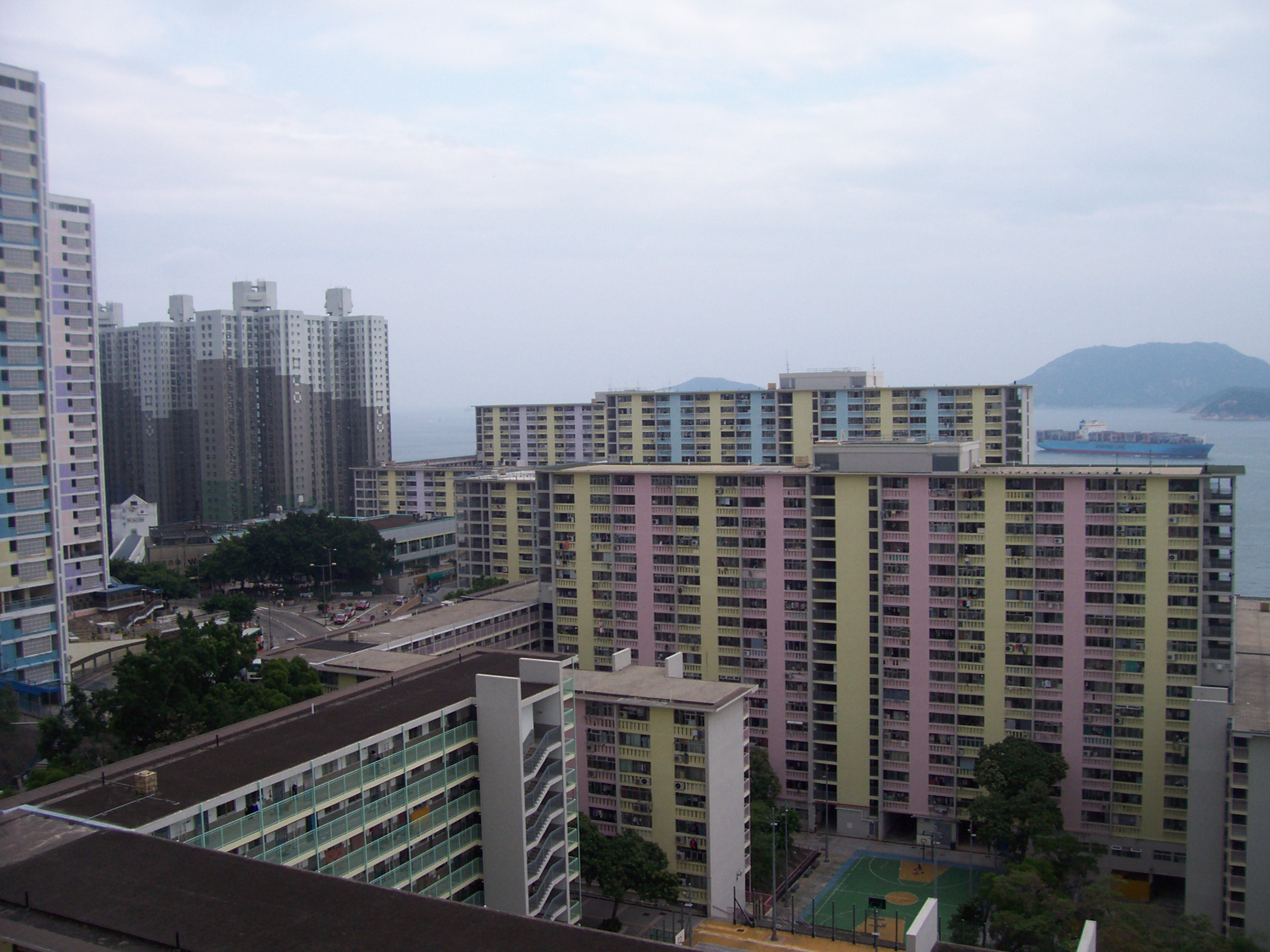
Most of the film was shot at Wah Fu Estate.

Principal photography began on 29 May 2018 at the Hong Kong Space Museum in Tsim Sha Tsui, with Alfred Cheung, Rachel Leung, and Ng Siu-hin also announced as part of the cast. Leung Ming-kai served as the film's cinematographer. Produced on a budget of HK$15 million, which Chin described as "difficult for a project of such scale", the production relied heavily on location shooting, cast mostly young new actors, and recreated many scenes set in the 1980s and 1990s through computer animation supervised by visual effects artist Water Chan. Most of the film was set and shot on location at Wah Fu Estate, which is scheduled for redevelopment beginning in 2027. As residents of Wah Fu Estate must pass through the Aberdeen Tunnel to reach the city, Kong found it "interesting" that "they have to travel from a quiet neighborhood into the dazzling prosperity of Hong Kong", and incorporated the Tunnel into the film. The production's single largest expense was renting a Hot Dog bus to film a sequence set inside the Aberdeen Tunnel. Several rooftop scenes at Wah Fu Estate and scenes inside Heem's (played by Wong You-nam) flat, were recreated as studio sets.

The funeral home scene was filmed in Lo Lung Hang, Hung Hom, and because the scene was set on 1 July 1997, the date of the Handover of Hong Kong, when heavy rain historically fell throughout the night, the crew prepared two water trucks for artificial raining effects, only for a real rainstorm to continue until dawn during filming. Scenes involving Lo Hoi-pang, including interactions with Wong You-nam and Charlene Choi, were filmed separately because of the production's inability to afford Lo for two additional shooting days. Filming lasted approximately 50 days, which Leung described as unusually long for a Hong Kong production, before wrapping in August 2018.

=== Post-production ===
Water Chan recommended editor Derek Hui, with whom he had previously collaborated on Soul Mate (2016), to the production team, and Hui subsequently brought in his frequent collaborator Joe Zhou to edit the first cut. Patrick Leung and editor To To later edited another version, after which the team combined the best sections from both cuts to shorten the running time. The film concludes in 2003, which Chin described as "the end of Hong Kong's golden era", as the year marked both the death of Leslie Cheung and the 2003 SARS outbreak. Chan said that the film contained approximately 380 visual effects shots, including extensive digital restoration on Wah Fu Estate, due to the estate's appearance in the 1980s differed significantly from its present-day look, with balconies having since been replaced by aluminum windows and air-conditioning units, many visual details had to be restored through visual effects. The scene in which the children witness a UFO was added with thunder and lightning effects as a tribute to the Japanese animated film Castle in the Sky (1986). A sequence in which the children break into an old woman's home designed to resemble the interior of a UFO, inspired by the works of Yayoi Kusama, was entirely cut from the film.

=== Music ===
Ciao UFO featured the theme song "Wah Fu One", performed by Feanna Wong, composed by Tsui Chin-hung, and with lyrics written by Pakkin Leung. Wong recorded the song in 2019 when she was 18 years old, and she had neither watched the film nor read the screenplay beforehand, explaining that she simply "sang the lyrics in a pure and straightforward way". She later performed the song at her first solo concert at the West Kowloon Cultural District in February 2026, prior to the film's release. The film also featured Lo Ta-yu and Ram Chiang's "Queen's Road East" and Sam Hui's "Half a Catty, Eight Taels". Patrick Leung specifically wanted to use the original version of "Queen's Road East" performed by Lo and Chiang, and after writing a letter to Lo's wife, he was granted permission to use the song in the film at what he described as a "very cheap" price.

== Release ==
Ciao UFO had its world premiere on 29 October 2019 as the opening film of the 16th Hong Kong Asian Film Festival. However, the film was unable to secure a theatrical release, with HK01 reporting that the delay stemmed from creative differences with the distributor, while United Daily News reported that investors indefinitely shelved the project due to "concerns over the market", with further delays caused by the COVID-19 pandemic and "societal changes" in Hong Kong. After cinemas reopened following the pandemic, Chin was encouraged by the success of films such as The Sparring Partner (2022) and revived plans for a theatrical release, leading to a special screening on 15 October 2023 during the 20th Hong Kong Asian Film Festival. According to industry specialist Ryan Ra, the film's production encountered disputes with its shareholders, as its main investors were predominantly from mainland China rather than Hong Kong, and the Chinese investors opposed a theatrical release. However, such restriction was only applicable to theatrical runs and not festival screenings.

After the distribution contract expired in 2025, Chin sought legal assistance to terminate it. Limited preview screenings in Hong Kong were then arranged, with one screening per day beginning on 19 December 2025, most of which sold out completely. According to Patrick Leung, the only edit made before the 2025 re-release was the digital removal of a tactile paving that did not yet exist in the 1980s from a continuity error shot. Following the film's positive reception, the production team reconsidered a full theatrical release. Golden Scene acquired distribution rights in March 2026, and the film was theatrically released in Hong Kong on 19 March. It was later released theatrically in Taiwan on 24 April, in the United Kingdom on 15 May, and also received limited screenings in Singapore from 15 to 24 May at Golden Village.

== Reception ==
=== Box office ===
Ciao UFO grossed approximately HK$1.2 million from its preview screenings, but earned only around HK$200,000 on the opening day of its theatrical release, which HK01 described as "falling far below expectations". The film grossed approximately HK$2.24 million during its opening week, and accumulated around HK$6.8 million after one month of release. It eventually surpassed the HK$10 million mark in May 2026 after about two months of release.

=== Critical response ===
Leslie Felperin of The Guardian gave Ciao UFO 3/5 stars, describing it as "really a straight-up multi-stranded realist drama" despite its sci-fi setting, praising its "colourful secondary figures" including "a spaced-out uncle who spouts Maoist anti-capitalist doctrine, a superstitious grandfather, and a doomed girlfriend who is the one who got away for one character", and concluding that although the film was "made back in 2019, it still feels fresh". In his 4/5 stars review for the South China Morning Post, Edmund Lee also observed that, despite having its premiere back in 2019, it has "only accrued an extra layer of poignancy in view of the years of chaos that the city has endured", with its "remarkably effective piece of storytelling" resonating with audiences "both as a touching character drama and as an elegy for a vanished 'golden age' that now exists only in the city's collective memory". am730 critic Ho Siu-bun also noted that although the film has a "fantastical plot", it is "not a mystery film but rather a story about growth and regret", and "despite its strong Hong Kong sentiment and cultural elements", it does not cheaply glorify old Hong Kong but instead portrays how a generation of Hongkongers in the 1980s were defeated and lost themselves in the process of growing up".

Gabriel Tsang, writing for Vogue Hong Kong, interpreted the film's use of UFOs and urban legends as "vessels of belief and symbols without narrative significance that satirise the emptiness of adults trapped in an endless cycle", arguing that the director "does not attempt to persuade audiences to return from worldly sophistication to a state of innocence or even childishness", but instead uses interwoven flashbacks between childhood and adulthood to "show the characters' anxiety within an increasingly homogenised 'ordinary world', and lead them to search for their true selves through self-determination". Calvin Choi, reviewing for the Hong Kong Economic Times, found that "some public housing estates carry symbolic meaning" and noted that Wah Fu Estate is "renowned for its beautiful sea views that would otherwise cost tens of millions of dollars to own", and therefore, for Kin, Hoyi, and Heem, "childhood represented the most carefree and beautiful period of their lives", while their coming-of-age story also "became intertwined with the history of a particular place and era, showing that even when people believe they control their own destiny, history and the times are always quietly shaping and influencing everyone's lives". Keith Ho of HK01 also commended the film's depiction of Wah Fu Estate, which is set to be demolished and is "portrayed on screen as both beautiful and dreamlike", as well as the ensemble cast, particularly Michelle Wai, who had not yet swept major awards with The Last Dance (2024) at the time of filming but nevertheless "gave a striking performance".

Fung Ka-ming of Ming Pao particularly praised the character Hofung, who serves as the film's narrator, finding that "the story unfolds through flashbacks prompted by his questions", which "challenge the values people have long taken for granted and ask what beliefs and aspirations remain beyond a lifetime spent pursuing profit", while noting that although Ho-fung always protected himself by hiding behind the older children, "through his eyeglasses he quietly witnessed the rise and fall of people and places and clearly understand the curse that has long haunted Hongkongers". P-articles's Brandon Yau wrote that the UFO long remembered by Kin, Hoyi, and Heem "symbolises both the limitless imagination of life and moments of autonomy over one's destiny", suggesting that "the absence of such autonomy constitutes Hong Kong’s collective tragedy while the pursuit of reclaiming it remains an ongoing historical aspiration, so that Ciao UFO represents not only Hongkongers' shared memories but also their collective character and desires", and he concluded that watching the film in 2026 "deepens one's understanding of Hong Kong's historical tragedy", as the city faces "repeated amendments of the national security law, leaving audiences wanting to urgently cry out 'Mayday, Mayday'". Wen Tien-hsiang rated the film 86/100 in his review for Mirror Media and similarly saw it as a story about "the transformation of Hong Kong and its era", writing that the film incorporates historical events such as the Handover of Hong Kong, the 1997 Asian financial crisis, and the 2003 SARS outbreak, therefore the characters' "farewell to childhood also becomes a farewell to the old Hong Kong", especially through scenes in which "the nationalist grandfather dies before witnessing the Handover" and "[Hoyi's] boss seeking fortune in China flees after discovering the fragility beneath its apparent strength", making the film especially "sarcastic" to watch in contemporary Hong Kong.

=== Accolades ===
Year	Award	Category	Nominee	Result	Ref.
2026	32nd Hong Kong Film Critics Society Awards	Best Film	—N/a	Won	
2026	32nd Hong Kong Film Critics Society Awards	Best Director	Patrick Leung	Nominated	
2026	32nd Hong Kong Film Critics Society Awards	Best Screenplay	Amy Chin, Kong Ho-yan	Nominated	
2026	21st Hong Kong Film Directors' Guild Awards	Best Film	—N/a	Won	
2026	21st Hong Kong Film Directors' Guild Awards	Best Director	Patrick Leung	Won	
2026	21st Hong Kong Film Directors' Guild Awards	Best Supporting Actress	Michelle Wai	Won	
2026	44th Hong Kong Film Awards	Best Film	—N/a	Won	
2026	44th Hong Kong Film Awards	Best Director	Patrick Leung	Won	
2026	44th Hong Kong Film Awards	Best Screenplay	Amy Chin, Kong Ho-yan	Won	
2026	44th Hong Kong Film Awards	Best Supporting Actor	Wong You-nam	Nominated	
2026	44th Hong Kong Film Awards	Best Supporting Actress	Michelle Wai	Won	
2026	44th Hong Kong Film Awards	Best Cinematography	Leung Ming-kai	Nominated	
2026	44th Hong Kong Film Awards	Best Editing	Derek Hui, Joe Zhou, To To	Nominated	
2026	44th Hong Kong Film Awards	Best Visual Effects	Water Chan	Nominated	
2026	44th Hong Kong Film Awards	Best Original Film Score	Tsui Chin-hung	Nominated	
2026	44th Hong Kong Film Awards	Best Original Film Song	"Wah Fu One"	Won	
