= Sofiee Ng =

Hong Kong actress (born 1989)

- 吳海昕
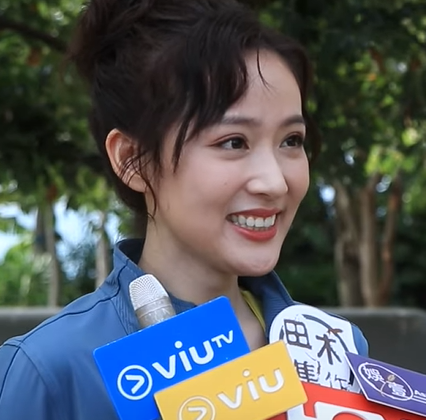
- Ng in December 2023
- Born: Ng Hoi-yan; 25 August 1989 (age 36) (Note: According to Sing Tao Daily, Ng had her birthday on 25 August 2021 and reached age 32.); Hong Kong
- Education: Hong Kong Shue Yan University (BA)
- Occupation: Actress
- Years active: 2017–present

Sofiee Ng Hoi-yan (Chinese: 吳海昕; born 25 August 1989) is a Hong Kong actress best known for her role as Yeesa Cheung in the ViuTV series Leap Day (2020), for which she was nominated for Best Actress in the 4th People's Choice Television Awards. She reprised her role in the spin-off series 940920 (2022), and also starred as Yung Hok-chin in another ViuTV series I SWIM (2022).

== Early life and education ==
Ng was born on 25 August 1989 in Hong Kong. She grew up in Wan Tau Tong Estate, Tai Po, and described her family's situation as poor. She attended Hong Kong Shue Yan University, where she earned a Bachelor of Arts in English language and literature. During her university years, she worked part-time as a model for advertisements. After graduating, Ng worked as a flight attendant for Cathay Pacific for four years. She became interested in acting after watching the performances of debut actors Cherry Ngan and Babyjohn Choi in the 2011 film The Way We Dance. Inspired, she decided to enter the film industry and participated in TVB's beauty pageant contest Miss Hong Kong 2014. Despite dubbed as a fan favorite by the media, she did not make it to the final three and only received the title of Miss Hong Kong Tourism Ambassador. After completing her term as ambassador, Ng spent a year studying at the New York Film Academy, where she earned a diploma in acting.

== Career ==
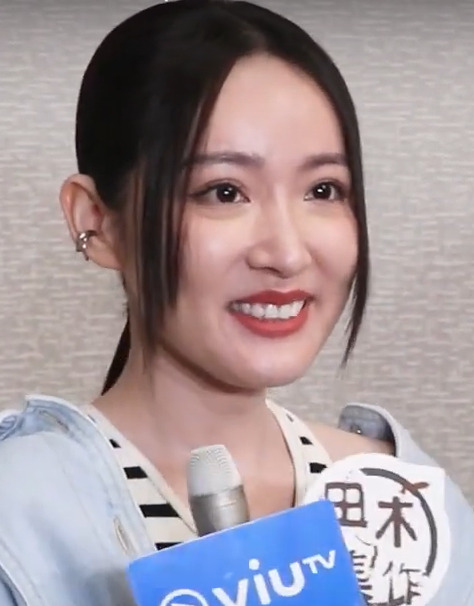
Ng interviewed by am730 in June 2023

Upon returning to Hong Kong from the New York Film Academy, Ng began auditioning for film roles and made her acting debut in Lawrence Ah Mon's 2017 crime film Dealer/Healer, portraying the younger version of Jiang Yiyan's character. She then starred in a main and titular role alongside Gregory Wong and Danny Chan in the ViuTV black comedy series 3 Haters. The following year, Ng landed a leading role alongside Justin Cheung in the TVB television film The War Net, and was given a starring role alongside Sammy Sum in the web series Dark Secret after signing with the talent agency Yiu Wing Live. In 2019, Ng took on a supporting role in the education-themed ViuTV drama series Limited Education, playing Yoyo, a cram school tutor and the girlfriend of the male lead Terrance Lau, followed by a guest role as a reformed cult follower Dr. Man in another ViuTV drama series Reboot. She also appeared in main roles in the ViuTV anthology series The Republic and Dark City. Shum Ngo-ming of Ming Pao praised her "appealing appearance" and "multi-faceted performance" in The Republic. In 2020, Ng starred in a lead role alongside Will Or as Maryanne, a law student involved in the Occupy Central Movement, in the political film Apart. She also made a brief appearance in the crime film Shock Wave 2 as a kidnapped woman, although her face was not visible throughout the film.

Ng received her breakout role as Yeesa Cheung, a time traveler caught in a love triangle with Terrance Lau and Chui Tien-you, in the 2020 ViuTV romance series Leap Day. She garnered public recognition for her performance, and was nominated for Best Actress in the People's Choice Television Awards. She also reprised her role as Yeesa Cheung in the 2022 spinoff series 940920. That same year, she appeared in another leading role as Yung Hok-chin, a teacher who develops a romantic relationship with a student on the swimming team played by Edan Lui, in the ViuTV sports series I SWIM. She also played Ginny, a web novelist, in the segment The Tenement of the horror anthology film Tales from the Occult, and made her stage acting debut later that year, starring alongside Andy Leung in Table for Two.

== Filmography ==
=== Film ===
Year	Title	Role	Notes/Ref.
2017	Dealer/Healer	Young Ho-yau (可柔)	
2020	Apart	Maryanne	
2020	Shock Wave 2	Kidnapped woman	
2022	Tales from the Occult	Ginny (阿芷)	Segment: The Tenement

=== Television ===
Year	Title	Role	Notes/Ref.
2017	3 Haters	Y	Main role
2018	The War Net	Si Tou Yeuk-hei (司徒若曦)	Main role; television film
2018	Dark Secret	Bui Ga-man (貝嘉文)	Main role
2019	Till Death Do Us Part	Jan	Guest role
2019	Limited Education	Yoyo	Recurring role
2019	Reboot	Dr. Man	Guest role
2019	The Republic	Rachel	Main role
2019	Dark City	Elsie	Main role
2020	Leap Day	Yeesa Cheung (張麗紗)	Main role
2022	940920	Yeesa Cheung (張麗紗)	Main role
2022	I SWIM	Yung Hok-chin (翁學千)	Main role

== Awards and nominations ==
Year	Award	Category	Work	Result	Ref.
2021	4th People's Choice Television Awards	Best Actress	Leap Day	Nominated	
