= Jiro Lee =

Hong Kong actor (born 1980/1981)

- 李尚正
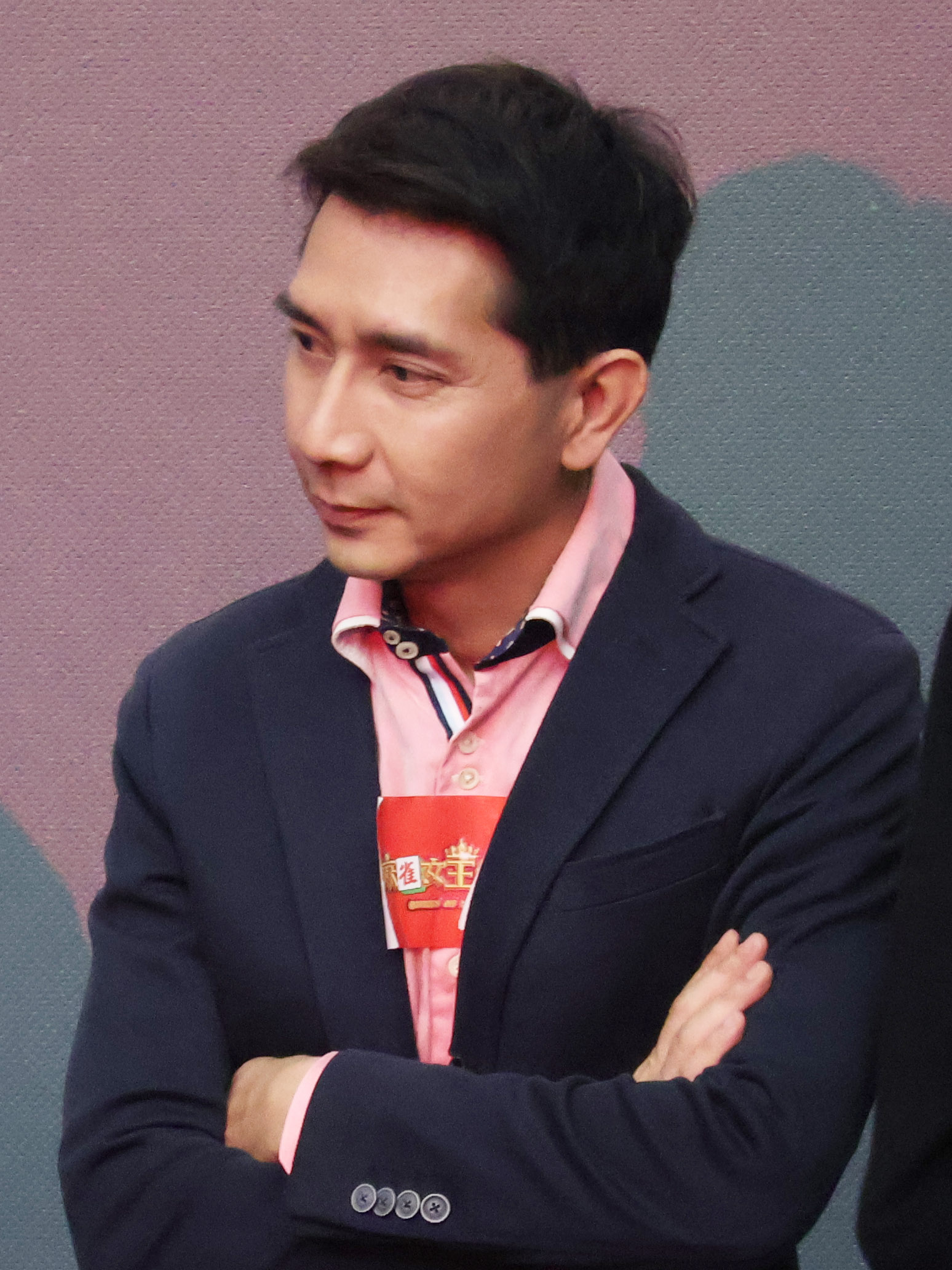
- Lee in January 2025
- Born: Lee Sheung-ching; 1980 or 1981 (age 45–46); Hong Kong
- Education: University of Hong Kong
- Occupation: Actor
- Years active: 2008–present

Jiro Lee Sheung-ching (Chinese: 李尚正; born 1980/1981) is a Hong Kong actor and television host. Lee rose to fame for portraying minor comical roles in Stephen Chow's comedy films, including CJ7 (2008), Journey to the West: Conquering the Demons (2013) and The Mermaid (2016). He co-wrote the screenplay of Journey to the West and was nominated for Best Adapted Screenplay in the 50th Golden Horse Awards. Lee later joined Hong Kong Cable Television and began to host TV programs, most notably the Casa Series and Undercover Tour. Lee also starred in the black comedy film Over My Dead Body (2023) and received a nomination for Best Supporting Actor in the 42nd Hong Kong Film Awards.

== Early life and education ==
Lee was born on 1980 or 1981. He attended Tsuen Wan Public Ho Chuen Yiu Memorial College and became interested in comedy when he was at school. After getting three As, one B and one C in Hong Kong Advanced Level Examination, he entered the University of Hong Kong to study architecture. However, he found himself not interested in the coursework and became pressurized with the heavy workload of internships and graduation thesis. He decided to dropped out in his third year and went backpacking in South America for half a year.

== Career ==
After returning to Hong Kong, Lee joined Hong Kong Cable Television as an entertainment journalist and co-hosted a program with Jan Lamb. The program sparked comedy film actor and director Stephen Chow's interest and Chow invited Lee to cast in a minor role in the 2008 sci-fi film CJ7. However, in 2010, Lee was severely injured in a car accident and was hospitalized for six months. He was forced to turn down all the roles offered to him by that time.

After recovery, he returned to Cable TV and continued to host television programs. He started the Casa Series and Undercover Tour in 2013 and 2014 respectively, which were both well-received and garnered Lee public recognition. Chow also invited Lee to co-write and star in the role of Sha Wujing in the 2013 fantasy film Journey to the West: Conquering the Demons. Lee and Chow, along with Derek Kwok and Ivy Kong, were nominated for Best Adapted Screenplay in the 50th Golden Horse Awards. Lee was cast in a lead role in the satirical comedy film The Midnight After in 2014. He also featured in Chow's 2016 fantasy film The Mermaid and the 2017 horror film Vampire Cleanup Department. In 2019, Lee landed his first major television role in the black comedy series Hong Kong West Side Stories, and had a main role in the crime thriller film Guilt By Design.

In 2023, Lee appeared in the black comedy film Over My Dead Body. He portrayed a comically priggish security guard and both his performance and sense of humour received universal acclaim. He received a nomination for Best Supporting Actor in the 42nd Hong Kong Film Awards.

== Filmography ==
=== Film ===
Year	Title	Role	Notes/Ref.
2008	CJ7	Mr. Cao	
2013	Journey to the West: Conquering the Demons	Sha Wujing	Also as screenwriter
2014	The Midnight After	Bobby	
2016	The Mermaid	Police officer	
2017	Vampire Cleanup Department	Inspector Chu	
2019	Guilt By Design	Chow Hung (周雄)	
2019	Ciao UFO	TV Host	
2023	Over My Dead Body	S.G. Lee (李寶安)	
2024	Last Song for You	School janitor	Cameo

=== Television ===
==== Drama series ====
Year	Title	Role	Notes/Ref.
2019	Hong Kong West Side Stories	Keung and Kwong (阿強、阿光)	Main role

==== Variety programs ====
Year	Title	Notes/Ref.
2013–Present	Casa Series	
2014–Present	Undercover Tour	

== Awards and nominations ==
Year	Award	Category	Work	Result	Ref.
2013	50th Golden Horse Awards	Best Adapted Screenplay	Journey to the West: Conquering the Demons	Nominated	
2024	42nd Hong Kong Film Awards	Best Supporting Actor	Over My Dead Body	Nominated	
