= The Mummy, Aged 19 =

2002 Hong Kong film by Wilson Yip

- Film poster
- 五個嚇鬼的少年; Ng goh haak gwai dik siu nin
- Directed by: Wilson Yip
- Written by: Kwok Chi-kin; Wilson Yip
- Produced by: Joe Ma; Ivy Kong
- Starring: Chui Tien You; Wong You-nam; Tiffany Lee
- Cinematography: Ko Chiu-Lam
- Production companies: Mei Ah Films Production; Brilliant Idea Group
- Release date: 31 October 2002 (Hong Kong)
- Running time: 95 minutes
- Country: Hong Kong
- Language: Cantonese

The Mummy, Aged 19 (pinyin: Ng goh haak gwai dik siu nin) is a 2002 Hong Kong comedy-horror film. It was directed by Wilson Yip and produced by Joe Ma Wai-Ho and Ivy Kong.

== Plot ==
The film is about a recent high school graduate who is having a hard time after finishing school and is embarrassed by his family and name. After being fired he takes up a new job as a security guard and the place houses two mummies. After trying to impress a girl whose cell phone he picked up after she dropped it he ends up being possessed by a mummy. His family and friends then have to perform an exorcism of sorts in order to save him as well as fend off the mummy's mommy.

== Cast ==
- Chui Tien-you
- Wong You-nam
- Tiffany Lee Lung-Yi
- Wyman Wong
- Benz Hui
- Siu Yeah-Jim
- Yuen King-Tan
- Li Chun-Wai
- Joe Lee Yiu-ming
- Matt Chow
- Chapman To

== Awards ==
- 9th Annual Hong Kong Film Critics Society Awards
