= Shine (Hong Kong group) =

Hong Kong Cantopop duo

- Born: Hong Kong
- Years active: 2002–present
- Musical career
- Origin: Hong Kong
- Genres: Cantopop
- Labels: EMI (2002–2004); Warner Music Hong Kong (2006–present)
- Members: Chui Tien-you; Wong You-nam

Shine is a Hong Kong Cantopop duo consisting of Chui Tien-you (徐天佑) and Wong You-nam (黃又南). They first signed with EMI and later with Warner Music Hong Kong. The band was Fruit Chan's answer to the male version of the group Twins.

In 2008, both members took roles in the movie La Lingerie.

== Discography ==
- 2002
  - Boys On Film
  - Favorites
- 2003
  - Semi-Matured Boy
  - Natural Shine
- 2004
  - Shine
  - The Best Of Shine (New + Best Selection)
- 2006
  - Shine On
- 2013
  - Essentials (New + Best Selection)
