= Raging Havoc =

Upcoming Hong Kong film by Derek Kwok

- Teaser poster
- Traditional Chinese: 怒火漫延
- Simplified Chinese: 怒火漫延
- Literal meaning: Raging Fire Spreads
- Hanyu Pinyin: Nù Huǒ Màn Yán
- Jyutping: Nou6 Fo2 Maan6 Jin4
- Directed by: Derek Kwok
- Written by: Derek Kwok; Ryan Ling; Ho Siu-hong
- Produced by: Andy Lau; Jason Siu
- Starring: Andy Lau; Nicholas Tse
- Cinematography: Jason Kwan
- Production companies: Emperor Film Production; The Generation Essentials Group
- Distributed by: Emperor Motion Pictures
- Country: Hong Kong
- Language: Cantonese

Raging Havoc, formerly known as The Unleashed Blaze, is an upcoming Hong Kong action film written and directed by Derek Kwok, produced by and starring Andy Lau. The film is a spiritual successor to the 2021 film Raging Fire, and stars Nicholas Tse returning in a different role while also serving as the film's action director.

The film was first announced on 14 March 2023. Production for Raging Havoc officially began in October 2023.

== Plot ==
As the reputation of the Hong Kong Police Force has reached its peak, Chief Commander Fong Wing-chau (Andy Lau) of the Operations Department is about to face a double crisis both in the workforce and in life. It turns out the mastermind behind this crisis is his younger brother, Chow (Nicholas Tse). After encountering Chow again, Fong discovers that his brother has become a ruthless criminal who is determined to bring Hong Kong down into a major crisis. Fong is persistent in his duties and refuses to bow down to crime, and fate has forced the two brothers head-to-head on opposite sides of the law. As the two engage in numerous battles and confrontations, many memories were brought which ignited burning rage and anger to both of them. Unbeknownst to them, everything is actually in the control of a dark, mysterious mastermind behind the scenes.

== Cast ==
- Andy Lau as Fong Wing-chau (方榮宙), chief commander of the Operations Department of the Hong Kong Police Force
- Nicholas Tse as Chow (阿秋), Fong's younger brother who is a notoriously ruthless criminal
- Michael Hui (special appearance)
- Ci Sha as Chow's underling
- Carlos Chan as Fong's superior officer
- Ray Lui
- Power Chan
- Kenny Wong
- Sammy Sum
- Mo Tse as Kan Sai-kit (靳世傑), a police officer
- Jeana Ho as a police officer
- Angus Yeung
- Tony Wu as a police officer
- Henry Fong
- German Cheung
- Chaney Lin
- Bruce Tong
- Andrew Pong
- Kevin Tong

== Production ==
The project was first announced on 14 March 2023 at the Hong Kong International Film & TV Market (FILMART) to be a spiritual successor to the 2021 film Raging Fire, the final film directed by Benny Chan, with Derek Kwok directing, Andy Lau producing and starring alongside Nicholas Tse, as part of Emperor Motion Pictures' upcoming film slate. Principal photography for Raging Havoc began in October of the same year. On 17 October 2023, the film held its production commencement ceremony at the Kai Tak Cruise Terminal which was attended by Emperor Group chairman Albert Yeung, director Kwok, Lau, Tse and other cast members including Michael Hui, Ci Sha, Carlos Chan, Ray Lui, Power Chan, Kenny Wong, Sammy Sum, Mo Tse, Jeana Ho, Angus Yeung, Tony Wu, Henry Fong, German Cheung, Chaney Lin, Bruce Tong, Andrew Pong and Kevin Tong. At the event Lau and Tse, the latter also serving as the film's action director, states the film has begun shooting for four days of the opening action scene involves Lau in fighting sequences. Tse also stated that Lau was the one who came up the film's Chinese title (Chinese: 怒火漫延; lit. 'Raging Fire Spreads') as a tribute to Benny Chan and continue on Chan's spirit of action, and Lau revealed that he had the idea when Raging Fire was released back 2021 and he wanted to continue Chan's style of filmmaking because he had starred in Chan's 1990 film A Moment of Romance; at the same time, he had also thought about collaborating with Tse again for a long time, so he gave a call to Albert Yeung. Lau and Tse will reportedly portray siblings who have a complicated relationship and are on the opposite sides of the law.

On 23 October 2023, filming of a major shootout scene took place at Statue Square where Tse's character wields a minigun and fires it at prop police cruisers. After Tse's shot were completed, Ci Sha's shots were being filmed where his character also shot at the police vehicles and ending with a big explosion. The entire filming of the scene took up to four hours to complete. Ho and Wu, who portray police officers, were also present for the shoot.

== See also ==
- Andy Lau filmography
