= Leap Day (Hong Kong TV series) =

Hong Kong drama television series, first broadcast in 2020

- Title card
- 二月廿九
- Genre: Drama; Romance
- Written by: Shek Chun-kit; So Sha-long
- Directed by: Steve Law
- Starring: Sofiee Ng; Chui Tien-you; Terrance Lau
- Theme music composer: Day Tai@ DDome Music; Labroe Lee @ DDome Music; Chan Yik Heng Eason @ DDome Music
- Composer: Day Tai
- Country of origin: Hong Kong
- Original language: Cantonese
- No. of series: 1
- No. of episodes: 10

Production
- Producer: Steve Law
- Production locations: Hong Kong; Sapporo
- Cinematography: Dino Wong
- Editor: Casper Leung
- Running time: 60 minutes (including commercials)
- Production company: HK Television Entertainment

Original release
- Network: ViuTV
- Release: 2 March – 13 March 2020

Related
- 940920 (2022)

Leap Day (Chinese: 二月廿九; Jyutping: ji6 jyut6 jaa6 gau2; lit. '29 February') is a Hong Kong television drama series produced by HK Television Entertainment and aired on ViuTV between 2 and 13 March 2020. Directed by Steve Law and written by Yellow Wong, the series stars Sofiee Ng, Chui Tien-you and Terrance Lau.

== Synopsis ==
Yeesa Cheung (Sofiee Ng), born on a leap day, believes her birthday is squeezed between 28 February and 1 March in common years. When she celebrates her birthday in 2017, she unexpectedly travels to 29 February 2020 in Sapporo. There she is greeted by two strangers, Ryan Ma (Chui Tien-you) and Yu Ka-chung (Terrance Lau), and finds her future self killed in a traffic accident. After she returns to 2017, only one second has passed, but the three have now to work together to circumvent their common destiny.

== Production ==
The crew describe the genre as romance more than sci-fi. The director, Steve Law, drew inspiration from a friend of his who was born on 29 February, before incorporating the idea of time travel. The filming in Hong Kong was completed before the overseas scenes. The crew initially planned to set the story in Taipei but later chose Sapporo to add to mystical and romantic elements. They received support and sponsor from the Sapporo Film Commission to cast Japanese characters at the desired spots. Yamano Hisaji, the coordinator of the collaborating producer company in Japan, was additionally cast to play the pivotal role of Kagawa Niro. With a limited budget, the crew had a tight filming schedule, hence some missing scenes had to be added by computer graphics and some written plots, such as the ending of Kagawa, were not filmed. The crash scene in Episode 9 was so complicated and expensive that, in order to ensure a smooth filming, Law and cinematographer Dino Wong found a visualiser to draw a storyboard, which is rare for a television series. The post-production was completed three days before the finale was aired.

Sofiee Ng worked with Steve Law on Margaret & David - Ex the Special Episode and Terrance Lau with Yellow Wong on Limited Education. They both accepted the roles without reading the script, based on the previous working experience with the crew. Ng had three ligaments torn during the filming of a chasing scene in Sapporo but went on with the shooting.

== Cast and characters ==
=== Main characters ===
- Sofiee Ng as Yeesa Cheung (張麗紗)

Born on 29 February 1992, she believes she is unlucky because she has a quarter of birthday wishes compared to others. She aspires to be a professional designer but has not found a permanent job for three years since graduation from a design degree. She describes herself as being indecisive, as she is afraid of bearing responsibility for her decisions. Her character name is inspired by Riisa Naka, the voice actress for Makoto Konno of The Girl Who Leapt Through Time.

- Chui Tien-you as Ryan Ma (馬智浩)

He aspires to be a professional Japanese chef but is growingly unsatisfied with his job at a supermarket. He puts his mother and sister before himself.

- Terrance Lau as Yu Ka-chung (余家聰)

A doctor of philosophy and chairman of Sacred Geometry Association. He distances himself from emotions.

=== Other characters ===
- Deon Cheung as Cheung San (張辰) — Yeesa's father. A grocery store owner.
- Kaki Sham as Pak Sai-kai 'Brazil Turtle' (白世繼; 巴西龜) — Vice-chairman of Sacred Geometry Association. Specialised in geometry and physics.
- Ranya Lee as Fiona Tse (謝心雪) — One of Yeesa's best friends. A professional real estate agent.
- Kiki Cheung as Lee Ka-man 'Kaka' (李嘉敏; 嘉嘉) — One of Yeesa's best friends. A beauty youtuber.
- Anna Ng as Lee (李姐) — Ryan's mother
- Krince Mak as Ma Tsz-ching (馬芷晴) — Ryan's younger sister. A senior secondary school student sitting for HKDSE in 2019
- Will Or as Jonathan — Fiona's boyfriend. A start-up entrepreneur.
- Eric Leung as Timothy — Kaka's boyfriend. A newspaper journalist.
- Yamano Hisaji as Kagawa Niro (香川二郎) — A beer deliveryman whose son suffers from chronic illness.
- Leung Tin-chak as 'Jesus' (耶穌) — Member of Sacred Geometry Association. Specialised in conspiracy theories.
- Esther So as 'Tripper' (跳掣) — Member of Sacred Geometry Association. Specialised in hypnosis.
- Kwan Wing-yu as 'Kwan Yu' (關羽) — Member of Sacred Geometry Association. Specialised in dimensional analysis.
- Cheng Man-hei as 'Alien' — Member of Sacred Geometry Association. Specialised in Extraterrestrial studies.
- Ho Kai-wa as Thomas — Ryan's coworker at a supermarket.
- Okizaki Chinatsu as Minamino Miko (南野美子) — Yeesa's mother. A native of Sapporo.

== Episodes ==
No.	Title	Original release date
1	"Zero past zero o'clock" (零時零分)	2 March 2020
In 2017, Yeesa Cheung receives a call from her alcoholic and dispirited father, San, asking her to tidy up his grocery store. In the storage room she discovers an omamori from her late mother's memento which appears to bring luck to her unfortunate life. After years of failures at finding a permanent job, she is entrusted by her friend Kaka to run a bookstore. As she was born on 29 February 1992, Yeesa makes a birthday wish in her bedroom at the exact second that 28 February ends, as she does every year. When she reopens her eyes, she is shocked at finding herself approached by a tram on a snowy tramway, but is saved by a stranger, Ryan Ma, before losing consciousness. As she wakes up at a Japanese hospital, she feels uncomfortable with the interactions with Ryan, who seems to know her very well, and decides to escape.
2	"Wanderer of time" (時空浪人)	3 March 2020
Yeesa manages to throw off the police with the help from another stranger, Yu Ka-chung. Ka-chung reveals to Yeesa that she has time-leapt to Sapporo of 29 February 2020, much to her disbelief. He also hints that he is her boyfriend and, before leaving urgently, gives her a secret code, "940920", that can help them meet again. Despite being told to stay at a hotel room, Yeesa wanders around the city. At night, she is shocked at seeing breaking news of a fatal traffic accident with a footage of her injury. At 23:59, she finds her another future self scattering some ashes on a footbridge; before she can comprehend the situation, she is brought back to her bedroom. Back in 2017, as the calendar turns 1 March, Kaka and Fiona arrive to give her a birthday surprise, only to find a hypothermic Yeesa. Yeesa is rushed to the hospital, where she bumps into Ryan, but he does not recognise her. Although she fails to convince anyone with her story, she reads Introduction to Time Travel in her bookstore. An interested customer, nicknamed 'Brazil Turtle', invites her to share her experiences on the online channel of the Sacred Geometry Association, a six-member society that discusses supernaturality.
3	"Sacred Geometry" (神聖幾何)	4 March 2020
Yeesa has diarrhea after eating a box of sushi. Encouraged by Fiona, she complains to the supermarket, where she meets Ryan, who works as a sushi preparer there, but he again denies firmly any knowledge of the time-leap. Yeesa shares her story on the live streaming of Sacred Geometry, but the hosts try to rationalise it with different theories and the audience ridicules her. On her way home, she is chased by a gang, but Ryan passes by and provides shelters for her in his home. The two introduce each other and Yeesa tells him about their future encounter. As Yeesa stays overnight on Ryan's sofa, his mother finds her kind and encourages Ryan to get close to her. They exchange numbers but dismiss chances of further development. As a far-fetched future entertainment news that Yeesa told suddenly proves true, members of Sacred Geometry begin to take her seriously; her second online sharing becomes the most-viewed episode.
4	"Gamblers' mindset" (賭徒原則)	5 March 2020
The chairman of Sacred Geometry, Yu Ka-chung, returns from abroad and is skeptical about Yeesa's story, but switches his mind when she tells him their secret code. Yeesa feels Ka-chung is cold towards her, unlike in 2020. Deducing that her time-leap is a recurring incident that enables her to change the future, Ka-chung theorises that it will happen again under the same condition, and suggests she receive a series of intensive training. Ka-chung finds his heartbeat rate exceptionally high but is unsure about his future relationship with Yeesa. Ryan convinces San to have a medical check-up, and a grateful Yeesa asks him for a dinner. Afterwards, Yeesa praises him for the tamagoyaki he made in Sapporo and encourages him to pursue his dream as a Japanese cuisine chef. At Sacred Geometry, Yeesa describes her omamori as a charm of good luck. However, Ka-chung repudiates it as merely 'gambler's mindset' for attributing her perceived luck to an unrelated object, and points out it is her friends and father who secretly help her out. He is again angry at Yeesa when she fails to memorise basic information and calls her irresponsible for her own future. Left with a damaged ego, Yeesa leaves the training but is cheered up by Ryan, who says she has always been lucky to be surrounded by helpful people.
5	"Startling news" (噩耗)	6 March 2020
Yeesa asks Ryan to participate in Jonathan's proposal surprise for Fiona, who aspires to be a good mother and soon gets pregnant. Ryan feels inferior to Kaka's and Fiona's boyfriends and eventually joins a Japanese restaurant as a junior cook. Ka-chung dismisses Yeesa's apology, saying emotional distance is essential for decision-making. However, Yeesa understands his deep care for her and resumes her training. On 28 February 2018, a well-prepared Yeesa leaps to a male Japanese bathhouse. While escaping, she hides in a lorry until the morning. At Ka-chung's instructions, she observes her 2017 self and confirms having leapt to the same place and time, thereby proving it is a recurring universe. She also attempts to check online the gender of Fiona's baby, only to find her memorial page. Astonished, she calls Jonathan and learns that Fiona, unwilling to give up her baby, died from cervical cancer in September 2018. When she returns to 2018, all the footage she filmed disappears, making all Sacred Geometry members but Ka-chung think the time-leap has failed. Ryan encourages a devastated Yeesa to save her friend, so she pleads that an incredulous Fiona should have a medical check-up. After the diagnosis, Fiona and Jonathan vow to support each other.
6	"Diversion" (分岔)	9 March 2020
Motivated by Ka-chung, a frustrated Yeesa shares the details of her latest time-leap, and recalls the lorry was involved in the fatal accident; Ka-chung rules out the possibility of coincidence. Yeesa then shares briefly about her mother, who died when giving birth to her, and her omamori. Ka-chung believes the omamori is crucial to the time-leap, but Yeesa refuses to investigate further as she feels insecure with diverting the future. Uneasy at seeing her closer relationship with Sacred Geometry, Ryan confesses his love to Yeesa, but she is hesitant to accept; nevertheless Ryan remains determined to love her. Fiona successfully has her uterus removed and survives beyond September 2018, but is haunted by sorrow. Ka-chung travels alone to Sapporo to investigate Yeesa's background and traces the accident to a beer deliveryman Kagawa Niro. Afterwards, Ka-chung concludes that Yeesa has to stop Kagawa from driving the lorry. Later, Ka-chung reveals to Yeesa that "940920" actually refers to the death date of his depressed mother, who committed suicide after being abandoned by his father. Ka-chung feels pity for her and believes love is void, but Yeesa, moved by San's unchanging affection for his late wife, treasures it.
7	"Omamori" (御守)	10 March 2020
In 2019, Yeesa falls asleep alone in her bookstore, and Ryan leaves her a hand-band as a Valentine's Day gift. Later, she explains that she always feels insecure to makes a decision alone so she wants them to prepare for the future together, but will delay confirming their relationship until 29 February 2020. On 28 February, Yeesa leaps to 2020 and attempts to stall Kagawa's lorry by pouring sugar into the engine. Following Ka-chung's notes, she then visits a shrine dedicated to time, where she learns from a priestess about her birth: her parents rushed to the shrine on a snowy night and her mother prayed to the deity to sacrifice her life for her child, while firmly grasping an omamori. At night, she sees Kagawa driving his lorry and follows the news to the accident site, where she recognises her hand-band on the ground and sees Ka-chung crying nearby. After Yeesa leaps back to 2019, Ka-chung advises she should avoid going to Japan at all cost, and she thanks him for leading her to discover her mother's life. Seeing her life counting down, Yeesa asks Kaka to take custody of her passport and returns the bookstore to her. Ryan receives appreciation for his hard work and is offered a training opportunity in Sapporo.
8	"Recursion" (迴環)	11 March 2020
Depressed Fiona attempts suicide, making Yeesa question her own action but Ka-chung comforts her with free will and fate. Yeesa asks San to share his life story and he finally expresses his decades-long guilt over his wife's death. With her mother's story, Yeesa encourages Fiona to live on with the memories of the departed. Ryan decides to join the overseas training but promises Yessa to return to celebrate her birthday. Yeesa and San's relationship greatly improves and they look after the grocery store together. When 2020 arrives, Ka-chung sees the fate as increasingly clear and summons Sacred Geometry to ensure Yeesa will stay in Hong Kong. However, he himself goes to Sapporo alone, insisting that it is to seek the truth rather than to protect Yeesa. Ryan is now well trained for making tamagoyaki and is asked to stay until 29 February. Without telling Yeesa, San visits his wife's tomb in Sapporo on the morning of 29 February; he is relieved from his grief but falls into a stroke coma. After spending a sleepover with her best friends, Yeesa learns about his father's critical condition and insists on seeing him regardless of the outcome. Fiona, who believes the future has changed, urges Kaka to return Yeesa's passport to her.
9	"29 February" (二月廿九)	12 March 2020
On the night of 28 February, Ka-chung visits Ryan at his restaurant; Ryan is convinced the future has changed but Ka-chung is wary. En route to the airport, Ryan saves 2017-Yeesa from an approaching tram at 0:00 and has his phone broken, cutting short of his call with 2020-Yeesa. Kagawa delivers beer to a bathhouse and unknowingly locks 2018-Yeesa up in his lorry before staying in the same internet café as 2019-Yeesa does. Ryan accompanies 2017-Yeesa at the hospital until the morning and gives her the tamagoyaki he made. He then calls 2020-Yeesa from the hospital and learns she is coming to Sapporo. Suspicious of him, 2017-Yeesa escapes from the hospital and bumps into Kagawa who visits his son every day. As she is pursued by the police, Ka-chung saves her and leads her to a hotel room, where he hints at being her boyfriend. Ka-chung receives a call from 'Brazil Turtle' about 2020-Yeesa's journey, so he urgently leaves after giving 2017-Yeesa a secret code. As Kagawa is about to begin his morning delivery, he finds his lorry stalled by 2019-Yeesa but later manages to deliver beer as usual. Ka-chung has no choice but to abduct Kagawa, but he breaks free at night. 2020-Yeesa arrives in Sapporo but realises that Ryan has a same hand-band as hers. Worried about Ryan, she decides to take responsibility and attempts to intervene, but is assaulted by an angry and exhausted Kagawa. Ryan saves the injured 2020-Yeesa and catches a car to hospital. Debt-stricken and now facing job loss, Kagawa learns that his son's health is deteriorating and rushes to hospital. Ka-chung arrives at the accident site and attempts to stop Ryan's car, only to see it crashing with Kagawa's lorry; he cries helplessly. Yeesa survives the collision but Ryan dies protecting her, dropping his hand-band on the snowy ground.
10	"Comprehending destiny" (知命)	13 March 2020
Ryan dies from the accident, recalling the memories that he has never accepted Ka-chung being referred to as Yeesa's future boyfriend. Remembering the priestess's teaching on sacrifices in all relationships, Yeesa unwittingly invokes the mystical power of her omamori and leaps back to half an hour before the accident. Understanding a death is inevitable, Yeesa attempts to die in Ryan's place. However, Ka-chung pushes her aside and gets knocked down by the lorry, with Yeesa and Ryan unharmed. Ka-chung dies with his memories of his heart beating fast whenever his future relationship with Yeesa is mentioned, though he is doubtful about it. Devastated, Yeesa stands on a footbridge as her omamori vanishes in ashes. At midnight of 1 March 2021, Yeesa wakes up from a one-year coma. Ryan, San, Fiona and Kaka are happy, but none of them has any memory of Ka-chung. Yeesa then visits Sacred Geometry, but fails to find any traits of Ka-chung in the five-member association led by 'Brazil Turtle'. She finds Ka-chung in the bookstore, but he is a famous novelist who sees her as a complete stranger, even upon hearing their secret code; Yeesa realises it must be a parallel universe that Ka-chung told her about. Yeesa sees Ryan off to another one-year abroad training. As Yeesa celebrates another birthday, she is not sure whether she will time-leap again. In the post-credits scene, Ka-chung publishes a novel titled Leap Day.

== Theme music and song ==
The original scores, opening and ending themes were composed by Day Tai and his team at D Dome Music.

"Sei nin yat yu" (Chinese: 四年一遇; lit. 'Quadrennial encounter'), composed, written, arranged, produced and sung by Chui Tien-you, was used as the ending song of Episode 9 instead of the normal ending theme. In the story, Ryan gives this song to Yeesa before he leaves Hong Kong for a half-year training in Sapporo.

== Accolades ==
Year	Award	Category	Nominee(s)	Result	Ref.
2020	Asian Academy Creative Awards	Best Drama Series – National Winner for Hong Kong	Leap Day	Won	
2021	Asia Contents Award	Best Actor	Terrance Lau	Nominated	

== Prequel and sequel ==
At ViuTV 2021, the channel's presentation show aired on 17 October 2020, a drama series titled 940920 was announced, alluding to the secret code between Yeesa and Ka-chung in Leap Day. The series will be produced by the same crew that produced Leap Day and will star Sofiee Ng, Terrance Lau and Cecilia Choi. It will be both a prequel and sequel to Leap Day, taking place in two universes and centred around Ka-chung. In the teaser trailer, the new character played by Choi discusses parallel universe with Ka-chung and invites him to be the first member of the Sacred Geometry Association she founded, whereas Yeesa expresses her wish to stay at a universe where she is a stranger. The story was originally set in Hong Kong and Yilan, Taiwan and filming was planned for the spring of 2021. However, the schedule was delayed by the global coronavirus pandemic. In May 2021, Law announced that due to force majeure, the script had to be rewritten to set in Hong Kong only and filming began in September.

940920 was broadcast as a ten-episode series on ViuTV, premiering on 7 March 2022.
