= Cheng Sihan =

Chinese actor (1961–2019)

Cheng Sihan (Chinese: 程思寒; 1961 – 6 November 2019), also known as Cheng Shihan (程逝寒), was a Chinese actor, known for playing major supporting roles in many television dramas and films, including Journey to the West: Conquering the Demons (2013) and The Taking of Tiger Mountain (2017).

== Biography ==
Cheng was born in 1961 in Jiamusi, Heilongjiang, China. After graduating from high school, he worked as a truck driver from 1979 to 1984. In October 1983, he struck a horse-drawn carriage while driving, injuring one person. He was later involved in another traffic accident and decided to change his career.

In 1986, Cheng tested into the Art Academy of Harbin Normal University, majoring in design. However, after his then girlfriend broke up with him, he quit his studies and moved south to Hainan Island in 1989.

In the late 1980s, Hainan was designated a special economic zone by the Chinese government and attracted migrants from all over the country. Like many other migrants, however, Cheng was unable to find a job there and had to sleep on the street after spending all his money. Desperate for work, he went to a film director he had met on the ferry to Hainan for help. The director took pity on him and gave him a background role as a migrant worker in the film Hot Love (热恋), which marked the beginning of Cheng's acting career. He then auditioned for a role (as Li Yi) in the film Tianya Liren (天涯丽人). Li Yi is an artist who is out of a job and becomes homeless in Hainan, which closely matched Cheng's own experience. He was therefore selected to play the role, his first credited appearance in a film.

Cheng moved to Beijing in 1995. In 1998, he had his breakout role as Zhu Fu in the television series The Water Margin, based on the eponymous classical novel. He later appeared in the TV series Mission of the Warriors (武林外史, 2001), Wind and Cloud (2002), The Proud Twins (2005), and Journey to the West (2010). He also starred in many films, including The Painted Veil (2006), Journey to the West: Conquering the Demons (2013) and The Taking of Tiger Mountain (2014). He was known for his freewheeling and often exaggerative performance, and is considered by many as a comedian.

== Personal life ==
Cheng was married twice. He had a daughter and a son, Cheng Zemiao (程泽淼).

Cheng died on 6 November 2019 from a heart attack, aged 58.

== Filmography ==
Year	Title	Role	Notes
2000	Kaixin dou lai mi	Fat man	
2006	The Painted Veil	Warlord Kwei	
2013	Journey to the West: Conquering the Demons	Master Nameless	
2014	The Taking of Tiger Mountain	Bro 4	
2017	Journey to the West: The Demons Strike Back	Monk Tang's master (in Liliput dream)	
2017	Du LiNiang	Guo Tuozi	
2017	Qimen Dunjia	Brothel Customer	(final film role)
