= Loneliness Can Kill =

Hong Kong television programme, first broadcast in 2020

- 寂寞是幫兇
- Genre: Anthology series
- Written by: Cheung Lai-sze
- Directed by: Ho Kwok-man
- Starring: Alma Kwok; Chan Kin-long; Howell Tsang; Yatho Wong
- Narrated by: Alan Po
- Opening theme: "一個一個人" by Alan Po
- Ending theme: "一起一個人" by Subyub Lee
- Country of origin: Hong Kong
- Original languages: Cantonese; Japanese; Korean
- No. of series: 1
- No. of episodes: 8

Production
- Producer: Ho Kwok-man
- Production locations: Hong Kong; Japan; South Korea
- Cinematography: Lai Wing-Cheung; Asa Li
- Animator: Cheng Yan-chun
- Editor: Ho Kwok-man
- Running time: 60 minutes (including commercials)
- Production company: HK Television Entertainment

Original release
- Network: ViuTV
- Release: 18 April – 6 June 2020

Loneliness Can Kill (Chinese: 寂寞是幫兇; Jyutping: zik3 mok3 si3 bong1 hung1; lit. 'Loneliness is an accomplice') is a Hong Kong television series produced by HK Television Entertainment and aired on ViuTV between 18 April and 6 June 2020. In the form of an anthology series, the programme is based on real-life events and interviews, and explores several social issues intensified by loneliness. It featured Alma Kwok, Yatho Wong, Chan Kin-long and Howell Tsang as the in-show crew who expressed their feelings and analyses during the production of the programme.

== Cast ==
=== Recurring characters ===
- Alma Kwok as Chocho (草草), scriptwriter
- Chan Kin-long as Paul (波叔), director
- Howell Tsang as Luke (阿碌), researcher
- Yatho Wong as A.J., assistant director

=== Unit characters ===
Inferior Elderly

- Akio Takei as Nishida Tsukasa (西田司)
- Tsuruta Hiromi as Suzuki Ryōko (鈴木涼子)

Left-handed

- Lee Jae-hee as Tae-ki (泰基)
- Kim Kyeong-min as Sang-ji (尚智)
- Eom Tae-hyeon as Beom-cheol (凡哲)
- Kim Soo-beum as Tong-shin (東勝)

Good 168 Hours

- Lee Chiu-wai as Wah (華仔)
  - Cheng Cheuk-name as younger Wah
- Chan Mei-shan as Wah's mother

Spirit of Marketing

- Mang Fan-wing as Matsuko (松子)
- Kwok Shiu-fan as Shadow
- Yonetaro Shimizu as Hans

Untouchable Lovers

- Liu Shuk-fan as Annie
- Giovanni Valencia as Mike (stock photo)
- Olanrewaju as scammer
- Olalekan as scammer
- ramos as scammer

== Episodes ==
No.	Title	Social Issue	Location	References	Original release date
1–2	"Inferior Elderly"; Transliteration: "Ha3 lau4 lou5 jan4" (下流老人)	Insufficient elderly care, ageism against the elderly	Japan	Ep1 Ep2	18 April 2020
1–2	"Inferior Elderly"; Transliteration: "Ha3 lau4 lou5 jan4" (下流老人)	Insufficient elderly care, ageism against the elderly	Japan	Ep1 Ep2	25 April 2020
Nishida Tsukasa, aged 71, is a waste disposal worker who lives under poverty in Yokohama. He is fed up with living on the meagre income from his manual labour job and decides to relying on government subsidies instead. However, he finds himself being looked down upon for being no longer productive. Unmarried and now jobless, he becomes a muenrōjin (relation-less old person). He is also shocked at witnessing an old neighbour found dead alone at home, without anybody to contact. He buys a bottle of petrol from a petrol station after being mocked by the staff. The night before the rent is due, he realises there is no way out. Suzuki Ryōko, aged 52, is a cheerful chiropractor who loves her job and her life. She takes a break from her patients to pay gratitude to the deity at the Ise Grand Shrine. Nishida and Suzuki board the same shinkansen Hope for Nagoya at Tokyo Station. Nishida sets himself on fire with petrol and dies on the spot, and Suzuki, sitting nearby, dies from smoke inhalation. The crew imagine, had the staff of the petrol station greeted Nishida with care, or had a friend called him, could the tragedy have been prevented? Interviewees: two elderly people who live alone in Hong Kong, psychiatrists, photographer who takes pictures for the deceased's belongings, president of Keepers and caretaker of the deceased's belongings
3–4	"Left-handed"; Transliteration: "Zo2 pit3 zi2" (左撇子)	School bullying	South Korea	Ep3 Ep4	2 May 2020
3–4	"Left-handed"; Transliteration: "Zo2 pit3 zi2" (左撇子)	School bullying	South Korea	Ep3 Ep4	9 May 2020
Tae-ki, aged 14, is a student in Class 2D. A left-handed person, he finds the world always at odds with him and likes going alone until he befriends Sang-ji in his class. When Tae-ki meets his classmates Tong-shin and Beom-cheol, he thinks they are going to be friends. Until one day, after Tae-ki witnesses Beom-cheol sexually molested by a senior student, Beom-cheol begins inciting their classmates to verbally attack Tae-ki on social media. Eventually, Tae-ki is often beaten up and even water-tortured by Tong-shin and Beom-cheol, leaving his eardrum ruptured. Increasingly hating himself, he fails to seek care from his parents, who only care about his academics. He repeatedly calls Sang-ji for help, only to be told to shrug it off or report to the teachers. His attempt to fight back results in quick loss to Beom-cheol, who takes shelter in the juvenile law that protects underaged criminals from facing criminal charges. On the Christmas Eve, Beom-cheol even breaks into Tae-ki's home and beats him. A desperate Tae-ki leaves a 14-page note to his parents, detailing the ordeals and helplessness he has gone through for two years, and commits suicide by jumping off a building. His parents and Sang-ji deeply regret. The public calls for an amendment to the juvenile law. The crew imagine, had Tae-ki's parents expressed concerns, or had Sang-ji stood by Tae-ki to withstand the torture, or had Beom-cheol not started a new bully circle by bullying Tae-ki, or had Tae-ki chosen not to give in to the bully, could the tragedy have been prevented? Interviewees: Bullied-bully, bully victims in South Korea and Hong Kong, spokesperson of Antibullying in Schools, clinical psychologist of Know My Students
5–6	"Good 168 Hours"; Transliteration: "Mei2 hou2 jat1 baak3 luk6 sap6 baat3 siu2 si4" (美好168小時)	Cocooning	Hong Kong	Ep5 Ep6	16 May 2020
5–6	"Good 168 Hours"; Transliteration: "Mei2 hou2 jat1 baak3 luk6 sap6 baat3 siu2 si4" (美好168小時)	Cocooning	Hong Kong	Ep5 Ep6	23 May 2020
Wah, aged 15, and his mother, aged 48, live in a small flat in a public housing. Wah has stopped going to school and lived in social isolation for seven years. One day in a hot summer, Wah finds his mother lying motionless on her bed. Although he realises his mother is dead, he does not seek help from the outside, but spends each day recalling the good memories before disowned by his father. He dies in hunger after seven days. The crew is aware that the case is pending the final verdict of the Coroner's Court, but writes the story based on known facts and their imagination. They imagine, had Wah's father, their neighbours or school social workers have paid them a visit in seven years, could the tragedy have been prevented? Can someone other than the Education Bureau and the Social Welfare Department have saved them? Interviewees: Professor who opens a café for hikikomori and its customers, former cocooners, social workers, psychiatrists
7	"Spirit of Marketing"; Transliteration: "gwong2 gou3 zi1 gwai2" (廣告之鬼)	Workplace bullying, karoshi	Japan	Ep7	30 May 2020
Matsuko, 24, is a graduate from the famous University of Tokyo and now a client representative in a multinational marketing company. She has been working overtime every day without taking day-off, but her proposal is disregarded by her manager Hans. She is constantly insulted by Hans and her colleagues, but no one in the company gives her any help. She is unwilling to quit the job, as she feels sorry for her mother, who fully sponsored her tuition fee. On the Christmas Day, Matsuko falls from the dormitory. The crew imagine, had Matsuko's shadow personified as a spirit to release her suppressed emotions, can she be saved from the overwhelming workload? Interviewees: People bullied at the workplace and their family
8	"Untouchable Lovers"; Transliteration: "zuk1 bat1 dou3 dik1 lyun2 jan4" (觸不到的戀人)	Online romance scam	Hong Kong	Ep8	6 June 2020
Annie, 62, is a widow who inherited a large sum from her late husband. She meets Mike, an American engineer, on an online dating app and the two have begun a long-distance relationship for one year without meeting in person. Mike has made several requests to Annie for financial assistance as his business is obstructed by illiquidity, and she always reacts promptly. Soon afterwards, Mike suddenly disappears from her connection, leaving her in despair. 'Mike' is actually impersonated by a group of scammers who use stock photos in their scams. The crew uses online dating app for researching the cases. Chocho falls in love with a Taiwanese handsome engineer who she meets online, but when she meets him in person, she is disappointed by his heavily edited profile picture. Interviewees: Online dating app users

== Accolades ==
Year	Award	Category	Nominee(s)	Result	Ref.
2020	Asian Academy Creative Awards	Best Infotainment Programme – National Winner for Hong Kong	Loneliness Can Kill - The Left Behind (II)	Won	
2021	The Telly Awards	Silver - Television: General-Public Interest/Awareness	Loneliness Can Kill	Won	
2021	New York Festivals TV & Film Awards	Entertainment Program: Educational/Instructional	Loneliness Can Kill	Finalist	
