= A.V. (film) =

2005 Hong Kong film by Pang Ho-cheung

- Film poster
- Directed by: Pang Ho-Cheung
- Written by: Pang Ho-Cheung; Wenders Li; Sam Chak-Foon
- Produced by: Catherine Hun
- Starring: Wong You Nam; Lawrence Chou; Derek Tsang; Chui Tien-you; Yan Ng
- Cinematography: Charlie Lam
- Edited by: Wenders Li
- Music by: Wong Ai-Lun; Janet Yung
- Distributed by: Mei Ah Entertainment
- Release date: 19 March 2005
- Running time: 103 minutes
- Country: Hong Kong
- Language: Cantonese
- Box office: HK$4,406,438.00

A.V. (青春夢工場; Qing chun meng gong chang) is a 2005 Hong Kong film directed by Pang Ho-Cheung.

== Synopsis ==
To satisfy their desire for Japanese porn stars, four university students decide to ask for government funding to direct their own adult movie. The project attracts numerous young people who want to be actors in the film.

== Cast and roles ==
- Lawrence Chou
- Wong You Nam – Jason
- Derek Tsang Kwok-cheung – Band-Aid
- Jeffery Chow Chik Fai – Fatty
- Chiu Tien-you – Kar Lok
- Yan Ng – Cally
- Monie Tung – Belinda
- Yoyo Chen – Fatty's girlfriend
- Christy Cheung- Student and aspiring actress
- Jim Chim – Uncle (porn DVD shop manager)
- Eric Kot – Loan Officer
- Chin Kar-lok – Action Director
- Chung King-fai – Recruiter for company
- Cheung Tat-ming – Warehouse Security Guard
- Hui Shiu-hung – Film Professor
- Bonnie Wong – Drugstore Owner
- Manami Amamiya – Japanese porn actress
