= Chui Tien-you =

Hong Kong actor, singer, writer and director

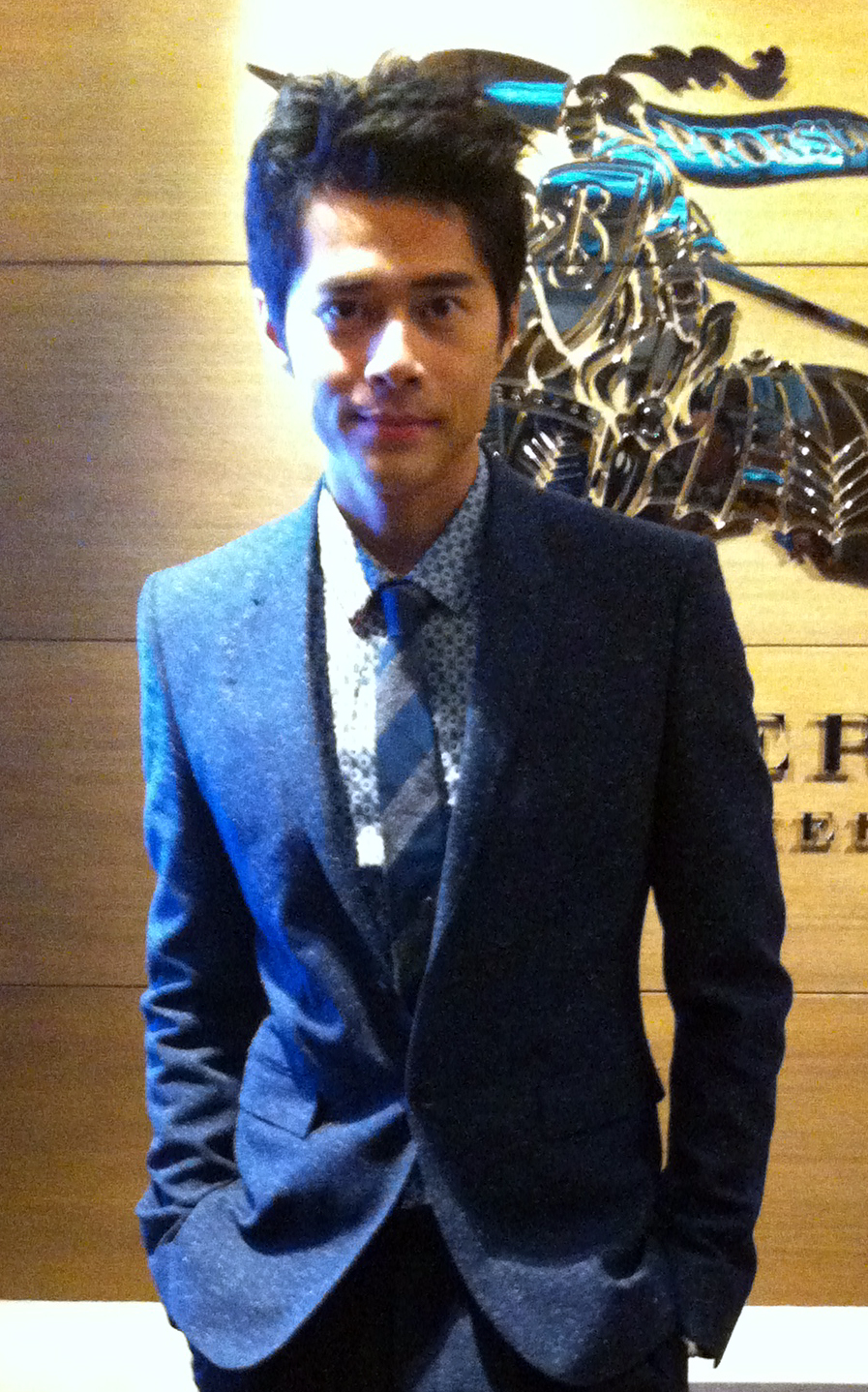
- Chui in 2012
- Born: Chui Man-kin (徐文健); May 16, 1983 (age 43); British Hong Kong
- Occupations: Singer; actor; writer
- Years active: 2002–present
- Musical career
- Also known as: Tien You, TY
- Genres: Cantopop
- Instruments: Vocals, guitar, piano

Chui Man-kin (徐文健, born May 16, 1983), better known as Chui Tien-you (徐天佑) or Tien You or "TY", is a Hong Kong actor, singer, writer and director.

== Early life ==
Chui was invited by director Fruit Chan for a beverage commercial shooting in 1998, when he was studying secondary school. He then signed a management contract and made his debut in Chan's Little Cheung as a guest actor.

== Acting career ==
Following secondary school graduation in Hong Kong and a half-year further education in Tokyo Japan, Chui began his onscreen acting career in 2000 in Lawrence Au Mon's film "Gimme, Gimme” and Lau Miu Suet's Glass Tears. Glass Tears entered the Cannes Film Festival 2001 where Chui celebrated his 18th birthday in Cannes.

Chui appeared in several films for instance Summer Breeze of Love and Sound of Colors by Joe Ma, and The Mummy, Aged 19 by Wilson Yip. He played a supporting role as a director in Pang Ho-cheung’s A.V. in 2005.

He starred as the grown-up son and attracted the most attention in Patrick Tam’s After This Our Exile. In the movie Magic Boy by Adam Wong and La Lingerie by Chan Hing-kai and Janet Chun, Chui’s sentimental roles brought him many compliments from film critics. He was then awarded the 2008 Rising Star in the 13th Pusan International Film Festival in Korea.

Chui became known to Southeast Asian audiences when he collaborated with Malaysian director Yuhang Ho in the movie At the End of Daybreak, which won the Asian Film Award in 2009 Locarno International Film Festival and 2009 Hong Kong Asian Film Festival closing film. In this breakthrough role, Chui portrayed a teenager who is psychological imbalanced, which caught international attention.

In 2010, after rounds of audition, Chui was offered an important role in Contagion directed by the Academy Award-winning film Director Steven Soderbergh. This was also his debut appearance in a Hollywood film, released in 2011.

Chui played a leading role in ViuTV television drama series Leap Day by Steve Law in 2020 and composed and sang the song "Sei nin yat yu" for the series.

== Filmography ==
=== Film ===
- Little Cheung (2000)
- Glass Tears (2000)
- Gimme, Gimme (2001)
- Summer Breeze of Love (2002)
- Treasure Planet (2002)
- The Mummy, Aged 19 (2002)
- Sound of Colors (2003)
- Himalaya Singh (2004)
- A.V. (2005)
- The Haunted School (2007)
- After This Our Exile (2007)
- Magic Boy (2007)
- Tactical Unit-Partners (2008)
- La Lingerie (2008)
- At the End of Daybreak (2009)
- Love in a Puff (2010)
- La Comédie humaine (2010)
- Mysterious Island (2011)
- Contagion (2011)
- The Woman Knight of Mirror Lake (2011)
- All's Well, Ends Well 2012 (2012)
- Kick Ass Girls (2013)
- The Buddha (2014)
- Enthralled (2014)
- The Midnight After (2014)
- Lazy Hazy Crazy (2015)
- Good Take Too (2016)
- Smurfs: The Lost Village (2017) Voice as Brainy
- My Little Pony: The Movie (2017) Voice as Capper
- Missbehavior (2019)
- Ciao UFO (2019)
- Unleashed (2020)
- Do Not Rescuitate (2022)
- Where the Wind Blows (2023) as Lui Lok

=== TV series ===
- Leap Day (2020)
- 940920 (2022)

== Theatre ==
- I Want It That Way (2016)
- Miyamoto Musashi (2019)as Miyamoto Musashi
- The Normal Heart by Larry Kramer (2019) as Felix

== Actor awards ==
- 13th Busan International film festival Asia Pacific Actors Award 「Rising Star」
- Lorcano International film festival Best Asia film award <At the end of daybreak>

== Singing career ==
In 2002, Chui together with his partner Wong You-nam set out Shine, a band that enjoyed tremendous local success. They immediately swept through a combination of the major Music Awards and turned them into popular teen idols of the year. They have released eleven albums, shot a number of TV commercials as the spokesman for many brands.

Despite the success, Chui decided to separate with his partner temporarily and pursued his acting career. Chui has teamed up with his partner Wong You-Nam again in 2012 after a significant performance at “Concert YY.” Shine had two major concerts in 2012 “Shine Again” and “Shine Passion Live”, in which the latter was a year-end count down show at the Hong Kong Coliseum.

In 2019, Chui released his first solo album "Thank You".And now he continues to release songs.

== Director ==
2013, Chui directs “Bullet Man”, a novel he wrote which is made into a short film. As a singasong writer, musician, singer, composer, artist, book writer, actor and now a director – Chui believes creativity is limitless and borderless; he is always excited to explore every possibility.

- <Ten> "Phoenix TV 10th Anniversary Shortfilm" as Actor, Director, Screenplay
- <Bulletman> as Actor, Director, Screenplay, Producer
- <Tan 90> as Actor, Director, Producer

== Other works ==
Apart from acting, Chui also involves in other creative genres. He has written a thriller book series called “Marson Studio”, screenplays, as well as various columns for newspapers and magazines. In 2006, he was invited to shoot a short film “Ten” for Phoenix Television, and became deeply interested in film directing. Since then, Chui has not stopped preparing for his first feature film where he writes, directs and acts.

== Written works ==
- 2010-2012 <Marson series> 1-4 episode
- 2011 <Sake winery journey>
