= Dealer/Healer =

2017 Hong Kong-Chinese film by Lawrence Ah Mon

- Film poster
- Traditional Chinese: 毒。誡
- Simplified Chinese: 毒。诫
- Hanyu Pinyin: Dú. Jiè
- Jyutping: Deok6. Gaai3
- Directed by: Lawrence Ah Mon
- Screenplay by: Chan Man-keung; Lam Wai-kuk
- Produced by: Julia Chu; Peter Chan; Cho King-man; Esther Koo; Ren Yue; Diao Lijun; Tang Wai-chuk; Yang Guang; Lee Wai; Lam Yuet-lan; Ricky Fan
- Starring: Sean Lau; Gordon Lam; Jiang Yiyan; Louis Koo; Zhang Jin
- Cinematography: Zhang Ying
- Edited by: Wong Hoi
- Music by: Yue Yat-yiu; Edgar Hung
- Production companies: Sil-Metropole Organisation; Leap Eagle Media Culture; Dalian Erdong Filming and Cultural; Cheers Studio; Sil-Meteropole Organisation (Guangzhou) Film & TV Culture; Beijing Each Media; Sumeru Culture Media (Shenzhen); Dreams Salon Entertainment Culture
- Distributed by: Intercontinental Film Distributors (HK)
- Release dates: 12 May 2017 (China); 18 May 2017 (Hong Kong)
- Running time: 101 minutes
- Countries: Hong Kong; China
- Language: Cantonese
- Box office: CN¥40 million (China)

Dealer/Healer is a 2017 action crime drama film directed by Lawrence Ah Mon and starring Sean Lau, Gordon Lam and Jiang Yiyan, with special appearances by Louis Koo and Zhang Jin. A Hong Kong-Chinese co-production, the film is based on the story of former Hong Kong triad member Peter Chan's recovery from drug addiction. Chan, who is portrayed in the film by Lau, served as one of the producers of the film. It was released in China on 12 May 2017 and in Hong Kong on 18 May 2017.

== Plot ==
During the 1960s-70s in Hong Kong, when the police were corrupt and triads ruled the city, it was the glorious days for Chan Wah (Sean Lau), La Ba (Gordon Lam), Kitty (Zhang Jin) and their brothers. Chan, who was very arrogant, was regarded as the leader of the "Thirteen Naughty Children of Tsz Wan Shan". Chan later meets the love of his life, Ho-yau (Jiang Yiyan), and spent his sweetest times with her. However, good times do not as long as Chan was being hunted down for drug trafficking. Fortunately, Chan was able to escape from death with the help of his frienemy, Halley (Louis Koo), who is the leader of the Anti-Drug Unit of the police force, but was unable to escape from the law. After being released from prison, Chan's father died while Ho-yau went missing, causing him to greatly blame himself. Chan realized his past mistakes and is determined to turn over a new leaf. Not only does he actively participate in helping youths rehab from drugs, he was also awarded as one of the Ten Outstanding Young Persons of Hong Kong. He also influenced La Ba and Kitty to the right path and helped mediate disputes among the triads and garnered great respects from both the triads and the police. Once while attending a drug treatment lectures in Japan, Chan encounters Ho-yau and once again wants to be together with her.

== Cast ==
- Sean Lau as Chan Wah (陳華)
  - Chan Kin-long as young Chan Wah
- Gordon Lam as La Ba (喇叭)
- Jiang Yiyan as Ho-yau (可柔)
  - Sofiee Ng as young Ho-yau
- Louis Koo as Halley (哈雷) (special appearance)
- Zhang Jin as Kitty (貓仔) (special appearance)
- Ng Man-tat
- Patrick Tam
- Lo Hoi-pang
- Chen Kuan-tai
- Billy Lau
- Stephen Au
- Ben Lam
- Wan Yeung-ming
- Nora Miao
- David Lam
- Jacqueline Chong
- Justin Cheung
- Deon Cheung
- Raymond Chiu
- Kevin Chu
- Tang Yat-ming
- Dave Lam
- Cliff Chan
- Lai Cheung-leung

== Production ==
Production for the film began on 26 October 2015 at the Drug Rehabilitation Center of The New Being Christian Fellowship in Pak Tam Chung.

== Reception ==
The film grossed US$4.42 million on its opening weekend in mainland China. It has grossed CN¥33.8 million there so far.
