= Chan Kin-long =

Hong Kong actor and filmmaker (born 1990)

- 陳健朗
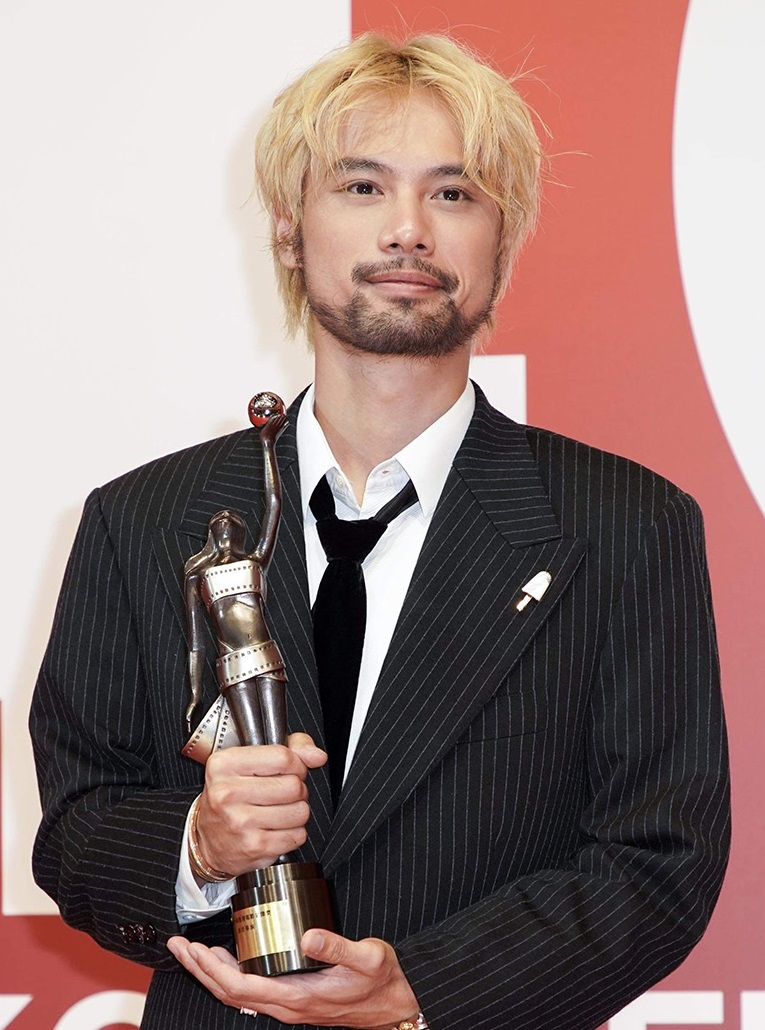
- Chan in August 2022
- Born: Chan Kin-long; 8 November 1990 (age 35); Hong Kong
- Education: City University of Hong Kong (BA)
- Occupations: Actor; filmmaker
- Years active: 2014–present

Kelvin Chan Kin-long (Chinese: 陳健朗; born 8 November 1990) is a Hong Kong actor and filmmaker. Initially working in the advertising industry, he was discovered by filmmaker Fruit Chan and made his debut as Glu-stick in Chan's The Midnight After (2014). He continued to act in minor roles before making his directorial debut with Hand Rolled Cigarette (2020), winning Best New Director in the 40th Hong Kong Film Awards. He also directed the ViuTV series Left On Read (2023), which won a People's Choice Television Award, and starred as Paul in the ViuTV series Loneliness Can Kill (2020) and as Dickson in the film Say I Do To Me (2023).

== Early life and education ==
Chan was born on 8 November 1990 in Hong Kong. He described his family's situation as "grassroots", which influenced the style of his future works. He studied at Ying Wa College, where he was classmates with fellow filmmaker Jun Li and the two became friends while participating in the drama club and writing plays together. He initially planned to apply to the Hong Kong Academy for Performing Arts, aspiring to become a stage actor, but missed the application deadline, and ultimately entered City University of Hong Kong to study creative media. During university, he shifted his passion from theatre to film after discovering the works of Fruit Chan, Johnnie To, and Japan's Akira Kurosawa and Takeshi Kitano, stating he was "heavily inspired by old-school Japanese cinema". He produced three short films, including Story of Ashin, Seven Days at Mino, and 1349 Road to Devil, and participated in several amateur performances during his university years. After graduation, he worked at an advertising production house.

== Career ==
In 2013, Chan was cast by filmmaker Fruit Chan in his sci-fi film The Midnight After as the gangster Glu-stick. The film premiered at the 64th Berlin Film Festival and received eight Hong Kong Film Awards nominations, which Chan described as "lucky" for debuting with a blockbuster. He also starred in the Fresh Wave short film I Can't Live Without A Dream, playing a terminal cancer patient, and won Best Actor at the 9th Sapporo International Short Film Festival the following year. Chan continued to secure minor roles in films, including Port of Call and Wild City, while also working as a production assistant. He received a co-starring role in the Fantastic Television romance series 100 Days of Love II, and appeared as the younger version of a gangster played by Deep Ng in the ViuTV sci-fi series VR Exorcist. In 2018, Chan played a smuggler in the political film No.1 Chung Ying Street, and appeared as a gangster in the Chinese drama film The Crossing. He was originally cast in the lead role as a smuggler, but the role was ultimately filled by debut actor Sunny Sun. He starred in a main role in the ViuTV anthology series Dark City the following year.

In 2020, Chan made his directorial debut with the crime drama film Hand Rolled Cigarette. He applied for the First Feature Film Initiative twice, winning in his second attempt with this project, and production began in 2017. Chan won Best New Director in the 40th Hong Kong Film Awards and received a nomination for Best New Director in the 57th Golden Horse Awards for the film. He also landed a lead role as Paul in the ViuTV drama series Loneliness Can Kill, and played the younger version of Bowie Lam in The Gutter. In 2023, Chan made his television directorial debut with the ViuTV thriller series Left On Read. The series was adapted from a web novel written by his childhood friend Ho Siu-hong, who also served as the screenwriter, and it won Best Cinematography at the 8th People's Choice Television Awards. Chan starred as the male lead Dickson, a social media influencer, in Kiwi Chow's drama film Say I Do To Me in the same year, and secured another lead role as Diga Chan in the 2024 ViuTV drama series Cicada Cycle.

== Personal life ==
Chan is a smoker. He began dating singer Jace Chan in 2020, but they broke up in October 2023.

== Filmography ==
=== As director ===
Year	Title	Notes/Ref.
2020	Hand Rolled Cigarette	
2023	Left On Read	Television series

=== As actor ===
==== Films ====
Year	Title	Role	Notes/Ref.
2014	The Midnight After	Glu-Stick (白膠漿)	
2014	I Can't Live Without A Dream	Chan Pak-kiu (陳柏橋)	Short film
2015	Port of Call	Policeman	
2015	Wild City	Hung (雄)	
2017	Dealer/Healer	Young Chan Wah (陳華)	
2018	No.1 Chung Ying Street	Wing-kuen (永權)	
2018	The Crossing	Seven (七仔)	
2019	My Prince Edward	Real estate agent	
2021	The First Girl I Loved	Kin-long (健朗)	Cameo
2023	Say I Do To Me	Dickson	

==== Television ====
Year	Title	Role	Notes/Ref.
2017	100 Days of Love II	Eric	Co-starring
2018	VR Exorcist	Young Hau (孝哥)	Guest role
2019	Dark City	Lau Tsz-chun (劉子進)	Main role
2020	Loneliness Can Kill	Paul (波叔)	Main role
2020	The Gutter	Young Thomas Li (李子勇)	Guest role
2022	In Geek We Trust	Hung Hom Crazy Bill (紅磡喪彪)	Cameo
2024	Cicada Cycle	Diga "Superman" Chan (陳迪加 / 超人)	Main role
2025	Where is My Fifteen Minutes	Himself	Cameo

== Awards and nominations ==
Year	Award	Category	Work	Result	Ref.
2014	9th Sapporo International Short Film Festival	Best Actor	I Can't Live Without A Dream	Won	
2020	57th Golden Horse Awards	Best New Director	Hand Rolled Cigarette	Nominated	
2021	23rd Far East Film Festival	White Mulberry	Hand Rolled Cigarette	Won	
2022	17th Hong Kong Film Directors' Guild Awards	Best New Director	Hand Rolled Cigarette	Won	
2022	40th Hong Kong Film Awards	Best New Director	Hand Rolled Cigarette	Won	
