= Journey to the West: Conquering the Demons =

2013 Chinese-Hong Kong film by Stephen Chow and Derek Kwok

- Theatrical release poster
- Chinese: 西遊·降魔篇
- Directed by: Stephen Chow; Derek Kwok
- Written by: Stephen Chow; Derek Kwok; Xin Huo; Yun Wang; Fung Chih Chiang; Lu Zheng Yu; Jiro Lee; Ivy Kong
- Based on: Journey to the West by Wu Cheng'en
- Produced by: Stephen Chow; Wang Zhonglei; Zhang Dajun; Ivy Kong
- Starring: Shu Qi; Wen Zhang; Huang Bo; Chen Bing Qiang; Jiro Lee; Chrissie Chau; Show Lo
- Cinematography: Sung Fai Choi
- Edited by: Chi Wai Chan
- Music by: Raymond Wong
- Production companies: Bingo Movie Development; Fox International Productions; Village Roadshow Pictures Asia; Chinavision Media Group; Edko Films; Huayi Brothers; China Film Group
- Distributed by: Huayi Brothers Media
- Release dates: 7 February 2013 (Hong Kong); 10 February 2013 (China)
- Running time: 110 minutes
- Countries: China; Hong Kong
- Languages: Mandarin; Cantonese
- Box office: $215 million

Journey to the West: Conquering the Demons (Chinese: 西遊·降魔篇) is a 2013 fantasy comedy film co-written and produced by Stephen Chow and co-directed by Chow and Derek Kwok. A Chinese-Hong Kong co-production, the movie was first announced in July 2011 and was released on 10 February 2013 in China. The film is a loose comedic re-interpretation of the 16th-century novel Journey to the West, a Chinese literary classic often believed to be written by Wu Cheng'en.

A sequel, Journey to the West: The Demons Strike Back, written and produced by Chow and directed by Tsui Hark, was released on January 28, 2017.

== Plot ==
The story takes place before Tang Sanzang got his disciples and embarked on the Journey to the West.

A riverside village is terrorized by a mysterious aquatic creature. A Taoist priest kills a giant manta ray and insists that it is the demon. Sanzang, a self-proclaimed demon hunter, appears to warn the villagers that the animal is not the true demon. The villagers ignore him and string him up due to the priest's provocation. The real demon reemerges and kills many of the villagers. Sanzang frees himself and along with the survivors, manages to beach the creature which turns into a man. Sanzang then opens a book of nursery rhymes and begins singing to the demon. Annoyed, the demon attacks Sanzang. Another demon hunter, Duan, captures and turns the demon into a puppet. Sanzang tells Duan that his master taught him a more humane approach; to use nursery rhymes to coax goodness out of demons, a tactic Duan scoffs at. Disillusioned, Sanzang meets his master and bemoans his lack of capabilities compared to more aggressive demon-hunters. His master reaffirms his humanist philosophy and sends Sanzang off again to find "enlightenment".

A couple enters an empty restaurant but the chef reveals himself to be a pig demon and kills them. Sanzang comes to the same restaurant, this time apparently filled with people. Sanzang sees through the illusion and recognizes them as reanimated corpses of the victims, as well as the demon's nine-toothed rake. Duan bursts into the restaurant, destroys all the zombies, and attacks the pig demon. She captures the demon in her magic bag to turn it into a puppet, but it bursts out of the bag and transforms into a huge boar, collapsing the building. Sanzang and Duan retreat. Duan then develops a strong limerence towards Sanzang after being impressed by his selfless ideals. She expresses her feelings, but Sanzang flees, not wishing to deal with romantic love in his quest for nirvana.

Sanzang's master advises him to tame the Monkey King demon Sun Wukong (trapped by Buddha) to subdue the pig demon. That night, he is captured by a gang that had also subdued Duan. It is later revealed to be a plot orchestrated by Duan to trick Sanzang into having sex with her. After Sanzang rejects her again, she has him imprisoned. The pig demon reappears and injures Duan, but is chased off by a trio of rivaling demon-hunters. Duan views Sanzang's concern for her injuries as a romantic attraction. After Sanzang refuses her advances again, she destroys his book of nursery rhymes and he leaves.

After days of traveling, Sanzang discovers a cave under a lotus garden, where Monkey King was trapped in for 500 years. Monkey King tells Sanzang to use a dancer to bait the demon. Duan appears and volunteers to dance. When the pig demon appears Monkey King easily subdues it, allowing Duan to turn it into a puppet. Duan then gives both the fish and pig puppets to Sanzang and offers her golden ringed weapon as an engagement band, but he rejects her again. She leaves after returning his nursery rhyme book, which she had pieced back together, although at random as she is illiterate.

Monkey King tricks Sanzang into removing the seal on his prison and bursts out of the cave. Sanzang begins to pray to Buddha, and an enraged Monkey King rips the hair from his head. The three demon hunters appear to catch Monkey King but he effortlessly kills them. Duan returns and defends Sanzang, but the Monkey King mortally injures her. Sanzang admits he loves her, and Monkey King proceeds to vaporize her body. Looking at the nursery book again, Sanzang realizes Duan reassembled the words of his book into those of the Buddha Sutra. Sanzang summons Buddha, who defeats Monkey King with the palm of his hand. Sanzang then places Duan's golden ring on Monkey King, and it turns into his restrictive headband.

Sanzang tells his master that his suffering due to Duan's loss has helped him to enlightenment. Sanzang is then instructed to travel on a journey to the west (India) for the Buddhist sutras of Leiyin Temple, and it is shown that the Water Demon, Pig Demon, and Monkey King have been tamed and turned into humans named, respectively, Sha Wujing, Zhu Bajie and Sun Wukong. As they hike across the desert, Sanzang looks across the sand and sees an image of Duan.

== Cast ==
- Shu Qi as Duan
- Wen Zhang as Tang Sanzang
- Huang Bo as Sun Wukong
- Chen Bing Qiang as Zhu Bajie
- Jiro Lee as Sha Wujing
- Show Lo as Prince Important
- Cheng Sihan as Master Nameless
- Xing Yu as Fist of the North Star
- Lu Zheng Yu as Killer One
- Chiu Chi Ling as Killer Two
- Yang Di as Killer Three
- Chrissie Chau as Killer Four
- Ge Hang Yu as Killer Five and Short Sun Wukong
- Fung Min-hun as Taoist Priest
- Yeung Lun as Mayor
- Zhang Chao Li as Almighty Foot
- He Wun Hui as Maple
- Tang Yixin as Blossom
- Chen Yichun and Liu Zhan Ling as Gao Family Inn Managers
- Huang Xiao Chuan as Leader of the Sand People
- Zhang Yu Wen as Sheng
- Xu Min as Mrs. Gen
- Li Jing as Gen
- Zhang Wei Fu as Grandpa Gen
- Fan Fu Lin as Muscleman
- Dai Qu Hua as Lan
- Zhong Kai Jie as Lan's baby
- Xie Jing Jing as Fat Lady
- Yu Qian Wen as Fat Lady's husband
- Kong Wu Shuang as Singing Girl
- Li Gao Ji as Taoist Priest Fook
- Wen Fei Fei as Monk Lu
- Huang Hai Seng as Monk Shou
- Zhang Wan Ku, Xu Wen Qiang, Chen Jian Feng, Li Nin Cai, Li Jing, Li Gui Suan, Han Xiao Chuang, Yu Ping, Li Yong Bo, Gong Meng Ying, Ge Hui Lei, Zhang Hong Di, Chen Xing Xiang, Zhang Cheng Long, and Wang Ya Bing as villagers
- Min Hun Fung

== Background ==
=== Key ghosts and demons in Journey to the West ===
Because of dialects and translations, there are various ways of spelling the demons names that are described below.

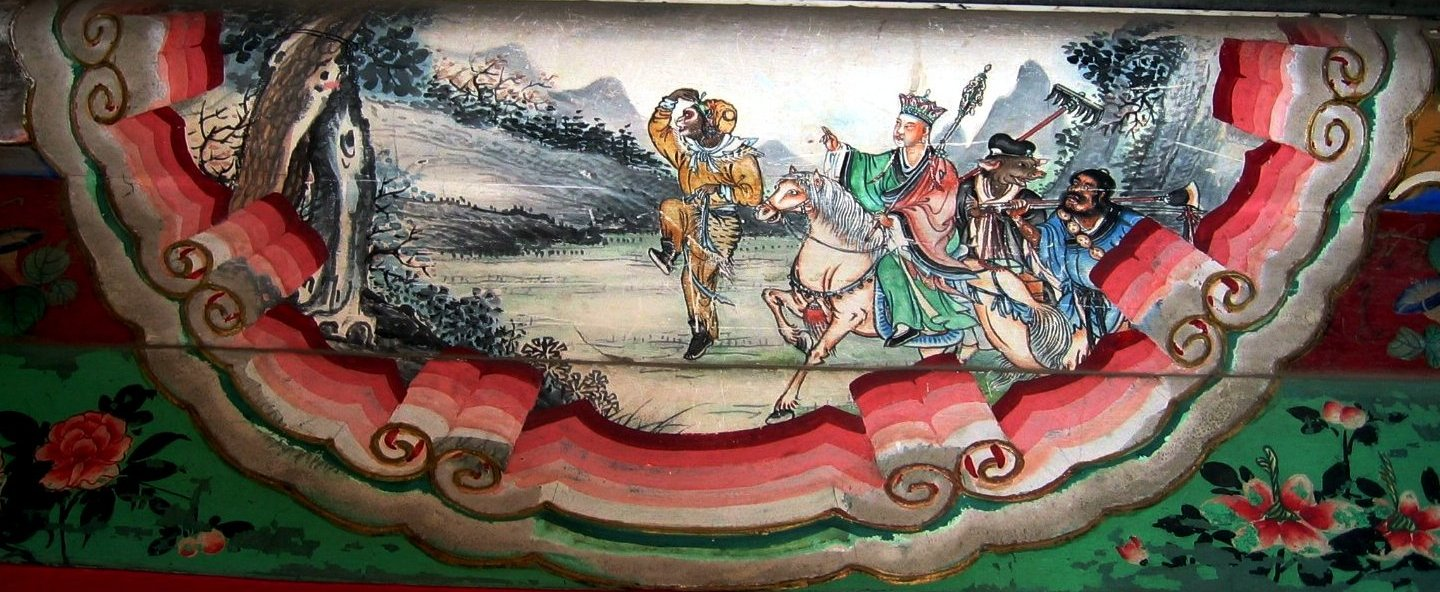
Sha Wujing (far right).

==== Sha Wujing ====
The Demon Sha Wujing is the first demon that we are introduced to in the film. Sha Wujing takes the form of a giant fish that begins by eating the villagers as they celebrate the killing of a giant manta ray, who they all believe, against Sanzang's pleading, is the demon. Also known as the 'Water Demon' in the literature, Sha Wujing's role in the film is to introduce us to Duan and Sanzang and their styles of demon hunting.

==== Zhu Bajie (Zhu Wuneng) ====
The Demon Zhu Bajie is the second formidable demon that is encountered in the film. In the film, his human form is that of a mute and playful inn keeper with a waxy visage. His demon form is that of a ferocious pig. Although he tries to trick Duan and Sanzang into becoming victims, Sanzang is able to see through Zhu Bajie's illusions and works with Duan in an attempt to defeat him.

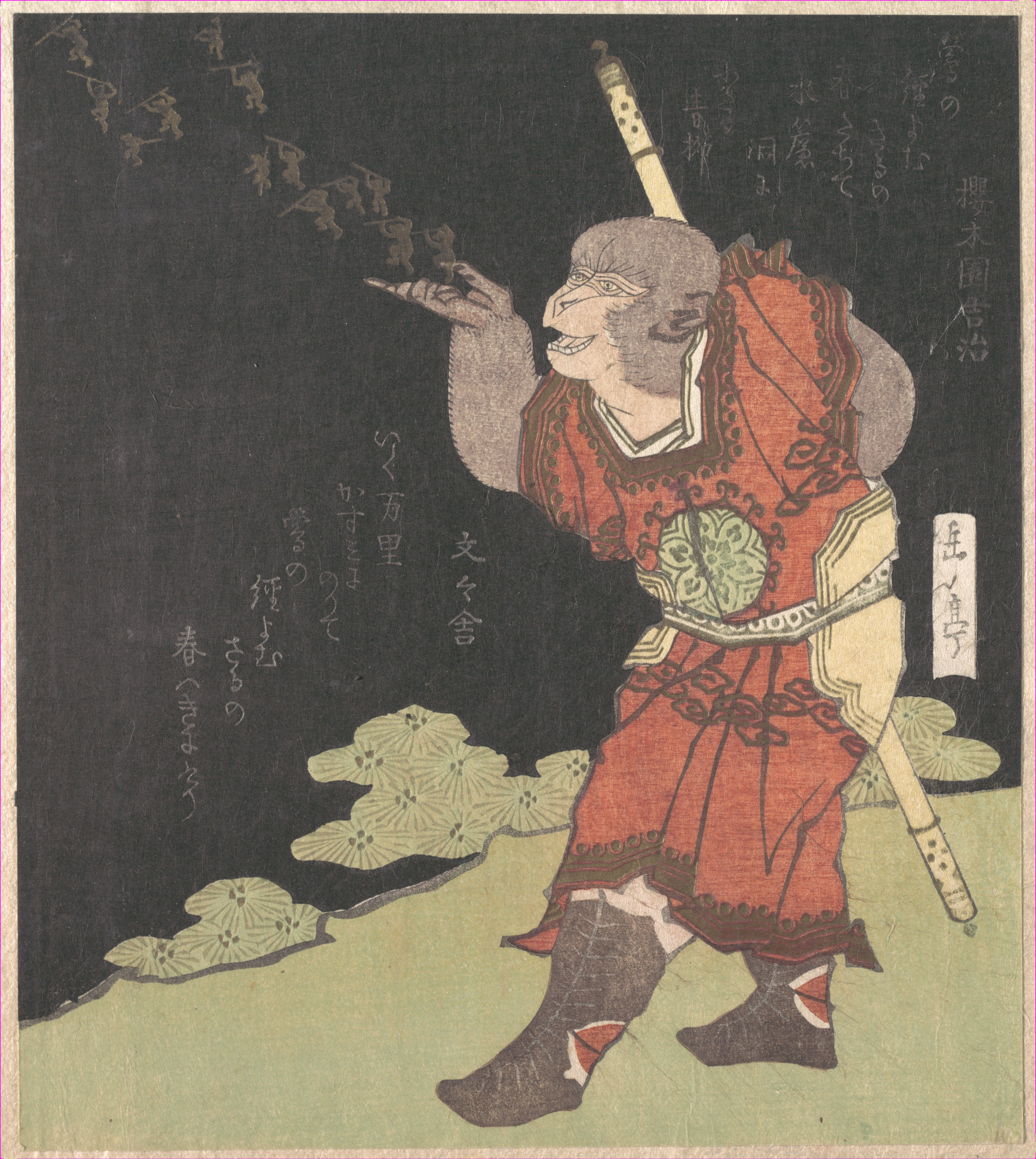
Sun Wukong- The Monkey King.

==== Sun Wukong ====
The final and most formidable demon that is encountered in the film is that of Sun Wukong, the Monkey King. Locked by Buddha in solitude in a hidden cave, the Monkey King first appear as a disheveled and awkward older man with monkey-like characteristics to his movements. Through many attempts at tricking Sanzang to release him, he finally succeeds, and we see The Monkey King restore himself to his greatest power and become the Demon Hunters' greatest threat.

== Reception ==
=== Critical response ===
The film was well received by critics. Rotten Tomatoes reported that 94% of critics have given the film a positive review based on 34 reviews, with an average rating of 7.22/10. The site's critics consensus reads: "As sweet, silly, action-packed and ridiculous as director Steven Chow's best work, Journey to the West serves up dazzling action sequences while playing its disparate elements against each other with thrilling abandon." According to Metacritic, the film has received a weighted average score of 68 based on 13 reviews, indicating "generally favorable reviews".

Edmund Lee of Screen International describes the film as "a thoroughly entertaining action comedy." Andrew Chan gave the film 9/10, wrote: "Stephen Chow latest revisit to Journey to the West: Conquering the Demons is a highly entertaining affair. From the get go, the audience is treated with Chow famed exaggerated style of comedy." However, the film provides its audience with something beyond entertainment. As American author Grady Hendrix says: "Now a director, Chow ups the stakes and makes what might be his most emotionally compelling movie yet".

=== Box office ===
The film set several records at the Chinese box-office. The film was released on 10 February 2013 in China and opened to 78 million Yuan ($12.5 million) on its first day, thus overtaking the 70 million yuan ($11.2 million) opening-day record set by Painted Skin: The Resurrection on June 28, 2012 as the biggest opening-day gross for a Chinese film. On 14 February 2013, the film grossed 122 million yuan ($19.6 million) and thus overtook the record of 112 million yuan by Transformers: Dark of the Moon as the biggest single-day gross by a film in China's box-office history. The film set an opening record in China with $92.46 million.

To date, the film has grossed US$205 million in China, US$3.6 million in Hong Kong, US$3.2 million in Malaysia, and US$1.8 million in Singapore.

Journey to the West: Conquering the Demons grossed a total of US$215 million worldwide, making it highest grossing Chinese-language film ever. It was surpassed by Monster Hunt, in 2015, as the highest grossing Chinese film ever produced.

== Sequel ==
Derek Kwok reported in March 2013 that there were ongoing discussions about a script for a sequel with Stephen Chow, who may appear in it himself. The film has a reported budget of around US$64 million. Filming started on 6 August 2015, starring Kris Wu as Tang Sanzang, Lin Gengxin as Sun Wukong, Mengke Bateer as Sha Wujing, Yao Chen as Taoist and Bao Bei'er as an unannounced character; Shu Qi and Cheng Sihan reprise their roles as Duan and Master Nameless respectively.

== See also ==
- A Chinese Odyssey (1995), a Journey to the West film adaptation starring Stephen Chow.
- The scene in which Sun Wukong tries to stop the palm of the giant Buddha is very reminiscent of a scene from video game Asura's Wrath, in which the main character Asura tries to stop the finger of one of the Seven Deities - Wyzen, in a similar manner, but instead of Monkey King, Asura goes victorious.
