= The Midnight After =

2014 Hong Kong film by Fruit Chan

- Film poster
- Directed by: Fruit Chan
- Written by: Chan Fai-hung; Kong Ho-yan
- Produced by: Amy Chin
- Starring: Wong You-nam; Janice Man; Simon Yam; Kara Hui; Lam Suet; Chui Tien-you; Cheuk Wan-chi; Jiro Lee; Sam Lee; Jan Curious
- Cinematography: Lam Wah-chuen
- Edited by: Tin Sup Fat; To To
- Music by: Ellen Joyce Loo; Veronica Lee
- Production companies: The Midnight After Film; One Ninety Films
- Distributed by: Golden Scene
- Release dates: 7 February 2014 (BIFF); 10 April 2014 (Hong Kong)
- Running time: 124 min
- Country: Hong Kong
- Language: Cantonese
- Budget: HK$15 million
- Box office: HK$21,202,240

The Midnight After
- Traditional Chinese: 那夜凌晨，我坐上了旺角開往大埔的紅VAN
- Simplified Chinese: 那夜凌晨，我坐上了旺角开往大埔的红VAN
- Literal meaning: That midnight, I got on a red public light bus that headed from Mong Kok to Tai Po
Transcriptions
Standard Mandarin
- Hanyu Pinyin: Nà yè língchén, wǒ zuò shàng le Wàng Jiǎo kāiwǎng Dàbù de hóng VAN
Yue: Cantonese
- Jyutping: naa5 je6 ling4 san4, ngo5 co5 soeng5 liu5 wong6 gok3 hoi1 wong5 daai6 bou3 dik1 hung4 VAN

The Midnight After (Chinese: 那夜凌晨，我坐上了旺角開往大埔的紅VAN; Jyutping: Naa5 je6 ling4 san4, ngo5 co5 soeng5 liu5 Wong6 Gok3 hoi1 wong5 Daai6 Bou3 dik1 hung4 VAN) is a 2014 Hong Kong horror comedy film directed by Fruit Chan and starring Wong You-nam, Janice Man, Simon Yam, Kara Hui, Lam Suet, Chui Tien-you, Cheuk Wan-chi, Jiro Lee, Sam Lee and Jan Curious. The film is based on the web-novel Lost on a Red Mini Bus to Taipo, by the 25-year-old Hong Kong writer nicknamed "Mr. Pizza" from the Internet forum HKGolden. It was first serialized online from February to July 2012 and then published in book form in July 2012.

The film had its world premiere at the Panorama section of the 64th Berlin International Film Festival on 7 February 2014.

== Plot ==
Seventeen people board a Hong Kong minibus which is going from Mong Kok to Tai Po. Driven by the minibus driver Suet, among the bus passengers are Yau Tsi-chi and Yuki, who are visiting their respective dates; Fat, an aging gangster; Mook Sau-ying, a fortune-telling insurance salesperson; Shun, a computer technician; Pat and Bobby, a married couple; Blind Fai, a drug addict; Au Yeung Wai, a music store salesperson; Lavina, a quiet, buck-toothed woman; Airplane and Glu-Stick, rowdy boys; and university students Tsing, Peter, Dawg, and Hung. As the minibus enters Lion Rock Tunnel, Fat notices the traffic seemingly disappear, and several other passengers remark upon how quiet the streets have become. The university students leave on the first stop, and one of them immediately becomes ill.

By the second stop, the passengers come to believe they are the only people remaining in Hong Kong. They propose various explanations, though Mook insists destiny has brought them together to experience a paranormal event. Before leaving, the passengers exchange phone numbers. Yau and Yuki leave together, and as Yuki talks about missing her boyfriend, Yau sees a man in a gas mask, though he keeps this from Yuki. After she leaves, Yau encounters the university students, all of whom have now become ill. They beg him for help as they melt before him. Yau swerves to avoid them on his bicycle as he speeds past, and the last remaining student curses him as he dies. Yau crosses the tunnel to return home but finds nobody there.

Each of the passengers receives a phone call comprising noises and mechanical screeches. They meet at a diner to discuss it, where Shun reveals he has performed audio analysis on it. He decodes English phrases that Au Yeung recognizes as lyrics from David Bowie's song "Space Oddity". No one understands its significance, though Mook continues to insist on a paranormal interpretation. After each describes their background, Au Yeung bursts into flames from the explosion by his electronics and dies. Spooked, Yau describes the man in a gas mask, though Yuki claims not to have been with him at the time. Yau spots another man in a gas mask, and he, Bobby, and Fat chase after the man.

Before catching him, they discover Lavina's body, surmising that she was raped before dying of a possibly-contagious illness. The man, revealed to be Japanese, claims through a mobile translation app to be there to save them and a former classmate of Yau's. Yau denies knowing him. As the Japanese man escapes, he says something about "fuku", which they speculate could be a reference to the Fukushima Daiichi nuclear disaster. Before returning with the others, Yau receives a phone call from his girlfriend, Yi, in which she claims he has disappeared for six years. The call ends abruptly as she makes oblique references to Major Tom and Tai Mo Shan.

Bobby suddenly dies shortly after Yau's return. Fat sends Suet to retrieve and refuel his bus upon learning of Yi's phone call. On the way, Suet is forced to kill a zombified Blind Fai with a cleaver. On Suet's return, Glu-Stick accuses Airplane of raping Lavina, who was an attractive thief in disguise. Glu-Stick says Lavina died mysteriously during her rape, but, undeterred by her death, Airplane continued assaulting her. Disgusted, the others discuss banishing Airplane, though Pat demands Airplane be killed for spreading Lavina's infection and causing Bobby's death. Yau reluctantly agrees, and each ritually stabs Airplane to death, except for Glu-Stick.

While Shun and Glu-Stick disposes of Airplane's body, Airplane suddenly revives. Shun argues his attack was the least vicious and offers to help Airplane get revenge on his killers. Airplane agrees, only to be killed again by Shun. As they board the minibus to go to Tai Mo Shan, the group sees more gas-masked people accompanied by armour. Two of the armour ram the minibus, but the damaged vehicle escapes and continues on its journey. After becoming annoyed with Glu-Stick, they briefly banish him before allowing him back in, along with Fai, who is inexplicably still alive. As they drive toward Tai Mo Shan, a red rain falls on the minibus, and several passengers experience regret at leaving Tai Po and back to Kowloon.

== Cast ==
- Wong You-nam as Yau Tsi-chi
- Janice Man as Yuki
- Simon Yam as Fat
- Kara Hui as Mook Sau-ying
- Lam Suet as Suet, the driver
- Chui Tien-you as Shun
- Cheuk Wan-chi as Pat
- Jiro Lee as Bobby
- Sam Lee as Blind Fai
- Jan Curious as Auyeung Wai
- Melodee Mak as Lavina
- Ronnie Yuen as Airplane
- Kelvin Chan as Glu-Stick
- Russell Zhou as Tsing, university student
- Zhang Chi as Peter, university student
- Sunday Yuen as Dawg, university student
- Wayne Si as Hung, university student
- Cherry Ngan as Yi, Yau Tsi-chi's girlfriend
- Endy Chow as Birthmark Japanese

== Production ==
Chan said he wanted to explain various problems in Hong Kong through metaphors. The film does not include the entirety of the source novel, and Chan said a sequel is a possibility.

== Release ==
The Midnight After premiered at the Berlin Film Festival on 7 February 2014, the film received a theatrical release in Hong Kong on 10 April.

It was the second highest grossing locally produced Hong Kong film in 2014.

== Reception ==
Film Business Asia gave the film a seven out of ten rating, referring to it as "an intensely local but exhilarating comedy-horror that shows Chan firing on all pistons with his indie energy of old." The review also noted that "Some of the dialogue, especially in the second half, starts to needlessly slow the film and could profitably be trimmed with no loss of detail — as in the movie's most blackly comic section when the group turns on a member with grisly results." Variety's Maggie Lee called the film a "delirious return to form" for Chan that will play well to fans of Hong Kong cinema, though she said it is uninterested in appealing to mainstream audiences. Lee described "themes of exile and death" and a "highly political message" about Hong Kong's itself. David Rooney of The Hollywood Reporter instead criticized the film's lack of tonal consistency, calling it a "tiresome comic strip of urban cataclysm".

Taipei Trends wrote, "The immense contrast and ridiculously inappropriate reactions from the characters to what is going on around them, as well as the strong personalities from each of them really sets the mood in a good way." However, it also added, "While the film continues to entertain, it soon becomes apparent that none of the mysteries that have been built-up will ever be answered."
