= La Lingerie =

2008 Hong Kong film by Chan Hing-ka and Janet Chun

- Theatrical poster
- Directed by: Chan Hing-Kai; Janet Chun
- Written by: Chan Hing-Kai; Janet Chun
- Produced by: Chan Hing-Kai; Amy Chin
- Starring: Stephy Tang; Janice Man; JJ Jia; Kathy Yuen; Ronald Cheng
- Cinematography: Wong Wing-Hung
- Edited by: Cheung Ka-Kit
- Music by: Chiu Tsang-Hei
- Production companies: Icon Pictures; One Hundred Years of Film Co. Ltd.
- Distributed by: China Star Entertainment Group
- Release date: 8 August 2008
- Running time: 118 minutes
- Country: Hong Kong
- Language: Cantonese
- Box office: US$1,237,565

La Lingerie (内衣少女, Noi Yee Siu Nü) is a 2008 Hong Kong film written and co-directed by Chan Hing-Kai and Janet Chun, and is a loose follow-up to Chan's 2001 debut La Brassiere. Stephy Tang heads the film's ensemble cast, which also includes Janice Man, J.J. Jia, Kathy Yuen and Ronald Cheng.

== Plot ==
Aspiring designer Miu Ho is hired as a "Lingerie Researcher", and is given the task of finding out how lingerie makes the woman, or in some cases, the other way around. After her aunt Lara unexpectedly passes away, Miu and her cousin Donut inherit a spacious, fully furnished apartment filled with designer lingerie. The two girls live upstairs from Celine, a gold digging flight attendant who has had items of underwear stolen by a mysterious thief, and after reporting the incident to the authorities becomes involved with part-time police officer James Shum. Donut works in a lingerie shop, and is involved with a much older married man, Henry, who buys her a pink bra as his first gift. Bargirl CC is a customer at Donut's shop, and after meeting Harvard student Eugene believes that she may have found true love.

Still a virgin, Miu is determined not to end up like her unmarried aunt Lara, and resolves to find her first love. Her new colleagues warn her about the office lothario, marketing manager Lucas, but after a failed attempt to bed her the two instead become friends. Lucas tries to teach Miu how to attract men, which leads to a number of encounters with potential suitors, including sperm bank worker CY and writer Jack Dee. Eventually she ends up in a relationship with "Prince" Antonio, the narcissistic heir to her company, but an increasingly jealous Lucas realises that his feelings for Miu are genuine after all.

== Cast ==
- Stephy Tang as Miu Ho
- Janice Man as Donut
- JJ Jia as CC
- Kathy Yuen as Celine
- Ronald Cheng as Lucas
- Maggie Lee as Lotion
- Wong Cho-Lam as Antonio
- Andy On as Eugene
- Chui Tien-you as Officer James Shum
- Chan Fai Hung as Henry
- Clifton Ko
- Wong You-Nam as the Lingerie Thief
- Gigi Leung as Lena
- Michelle Lo as Aunt Lara
- C-Kwan as CY
- 6 Wing as Jack Dee

== Development ==
Written and co-directed by Chan Hing-Kai and Janet Chun, La Lingerie has its roots in Chan's 2001 debut, La Brassiere. Speaking of that film, Chan said that although "[w]e did a lot of research, especially on the female side... we only took the point of view of men!" In order to redress the imbalance, Chan and his colleagues decided to make a film that gave "the female point of view about underwear", though the story changed several times before settling on four young women who hang out in a lingerie shop. He denied that the film had been inspired by the success of Sex and the City, saying that he had yet to finish watching the show's first season. Actress Gigi Leung, who starred in both La Brassiere and its 2002 sequel Mighty Baby, reprised her role as Lena in a cameo appearance.

== Release ==
La Lingerie opened in Hong Kong on 8 August 2008—the same day as the opening of the 2008 Beijing Olympics—though director Chan did not regard the timing as a problem. On its opening weekend the film was ranked third at the local box office, grossing US$398,512. By the end of 2008, the film had grossed a total of US$1,094,497 at the Hong Kong box office with an additional US$143,068 at the Malaysian box office, making a total gross of US$1,237,565.

== Critical response ==
Love HK Film.com regarded the film as neither "exceptional nor an accomplishment", but commented, "The whole 'underwear as metaphor' theme is rather thin, but as fodder for gags and oddball characters, it works... For a two-hour Hong Kong-specific urban comedy, La Lingerie is enough to entertain." Gabriel Chong of Singaporean website moveXclusive.com was more critical of the film, finding it "stale and not even mildly funny" and saying, "what this all amounts to are artificially concocted emotions that basically are just as hollow as the multiple characters here... Coming from Chan Hing-Kai who’s proven to be capable of much better, this is nothing less than a disappointment."
