= Terrance Lau =

Hong Kong actor

- 劉俊謙
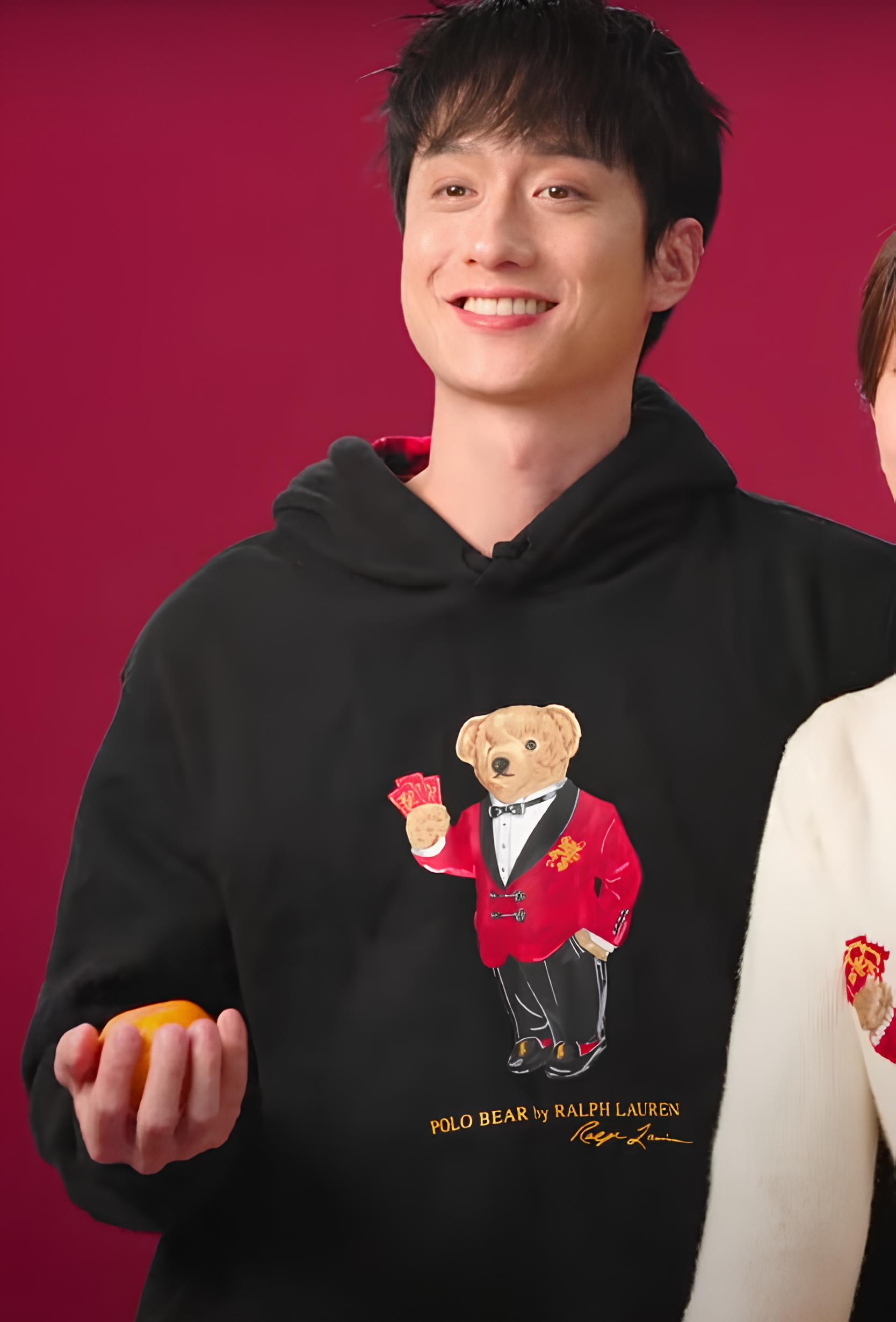
- Lau in 2024
- Born: Lau Chun-him; September 26, 1988 (age 37); British Hong Kong
- Education: Jockey Club Ti-I College; Hong Kong Academy for Performing Arts; Taipei National University of the Arts
- Occupation: Actor
- Years active: 2015—present

Chinese name
- Chinese: 劉俊謙
Transcriptions
Standard Mandarin
- Hanyu Pinyin: Liú Jùnqiān
Yue: Cantonese
- Yale Romanization: làuh jeun hīm
- Jyutping: lau4 jeon3 him1

Terrance Lau Chun-him (Chinese: 劉俊謙; born 26 September 1988) is a Hong Kong actor. He is known for playing leading roles in Beyond the Dream and Twilight of the Warriors: Walled In, for which he won for the Best Actor award at the 26th Hong Kong Film Critics Society Awards, the Best New Performer award at the 31st Hong Kong Film Directors' Guild Awards and was nominated for Best New Performer at 39th Hong Kong Film Awards and 57th Golden Horse Awards.

== Filmography ==
=== Film ===
Year	English title	Original title	Role	Notes/Ref.
2019	Beyond The Dream	幻愛	Lee Chi-lok	
2021	Anita	梅艷芳	Leslie Cheung	
2023	Trouble Girl	小曉	Paul	
2023	Tales from the Occult: Body and Soul	失衡凶間之罪與殺	Kwok Hin	
2024	I Did It My Way	潛行	Davis	
2024	Twilight of the Warriors: Walled In	九龍城寨之圍城	Shin	
2024	Peg O' My Heart	贖夢	Dr. Man	
2024	Stuntman	武替道	Lung Jai	
2026	Cold War 1994	寒戰1994	M.B. Lee	

=== Television series ===
Year	English title	Original title	Role	Channel	Notes
2016	We I U	We I U	Lau Him	ViuTV	
2016	Kai pop	Kai pop	Lau Kai	ViuTV	
2017	Trouble Free Salon	忘憂理髮店	Sam	RTHK	
2017	Ombudsman Special II	申訴II: 一命都不能少	Tung the ambulanceman	RTHK	
2017	Sign Language V	手語隨想曲5		RTHK	
2017	Midnight Cousin	午夜伴廊	Jacky	ViuTV	
2017	Margaret & David - Ex	瑪嘉烈與大衛系列 前度	David	ViuTV	
2017	Next Exit	未來還未來	Lau Chun	ViuTV	
2018	Afterlife Firm	身後事務所	John (Ep 11-12)	ViuTV	
2018	Elite Brigade IV	火速救兵IV	Hon Chun-kit (Patrick)	RTHK	
2018	If Love Was Not Timeless	假若愛有期限	Tat	ViuTV	
2019	Limited Education	教束	Lo Man-tat	ViuTV	
2020	Leap Day	二月廿九	Yu Ka-chung	ViuTV	
2022	940920	940920	Yu Ka-chung	ViuTV	
2023	At the Moment	此時此刻	Chen Chun-pin	Netflix	

=== Music video appearances ===
Year	Title	Artist	Ref.
2024	"Breaking Up Slowly"	Cloud Wan	

=== Stage ===
- 《舞鬥》 (2015)
- 《謀殺現場》 A Spot of Murder (2015)
- 《電子城市》 Electronic City (2015)
- Who's Next II (2015)
- 《馬克白》 Macbeth (2016)
- 《前度》 Skylight (2016)
- 《在牛池灣轉角遇上彩虹》 An Accidental Rainbow (2017)
- 《天邊外》 Beyond the horizon (2017)
- 《色相》 Make Love Visible (2019)
- 《午睡》 Waking Dreams in 1984 (2021)

== Awards and nominations ==
Year	Award	Category	Nominated work	Result
2020	26th Hong Kong Film Critics Society Awards	Best Actor	Beyond the Dream	Won
2020	31st Hong Kong Film Directors' Guild Awards	Best New Performer	Beyond the Dream	Won
2020	39th Hong Kong Film Awards	Best New Performer	Beyond the Dream	Nominated
2020	57th Golden Horse Awards	Best New Performer	Beyond the Dream	Nominated
2021	3rd Asia Contents Awards	Best Actor	Leap Day	Nominated
2024	26th Taipei Film Awards	Best Supporting Actor	Trouble Girl	Nominated
2024	59th Golden Bell Awards	Best Leading Actor in a TV Series	At the Moment	Nominated
