= Wong You-nam =

Hong Kong actor

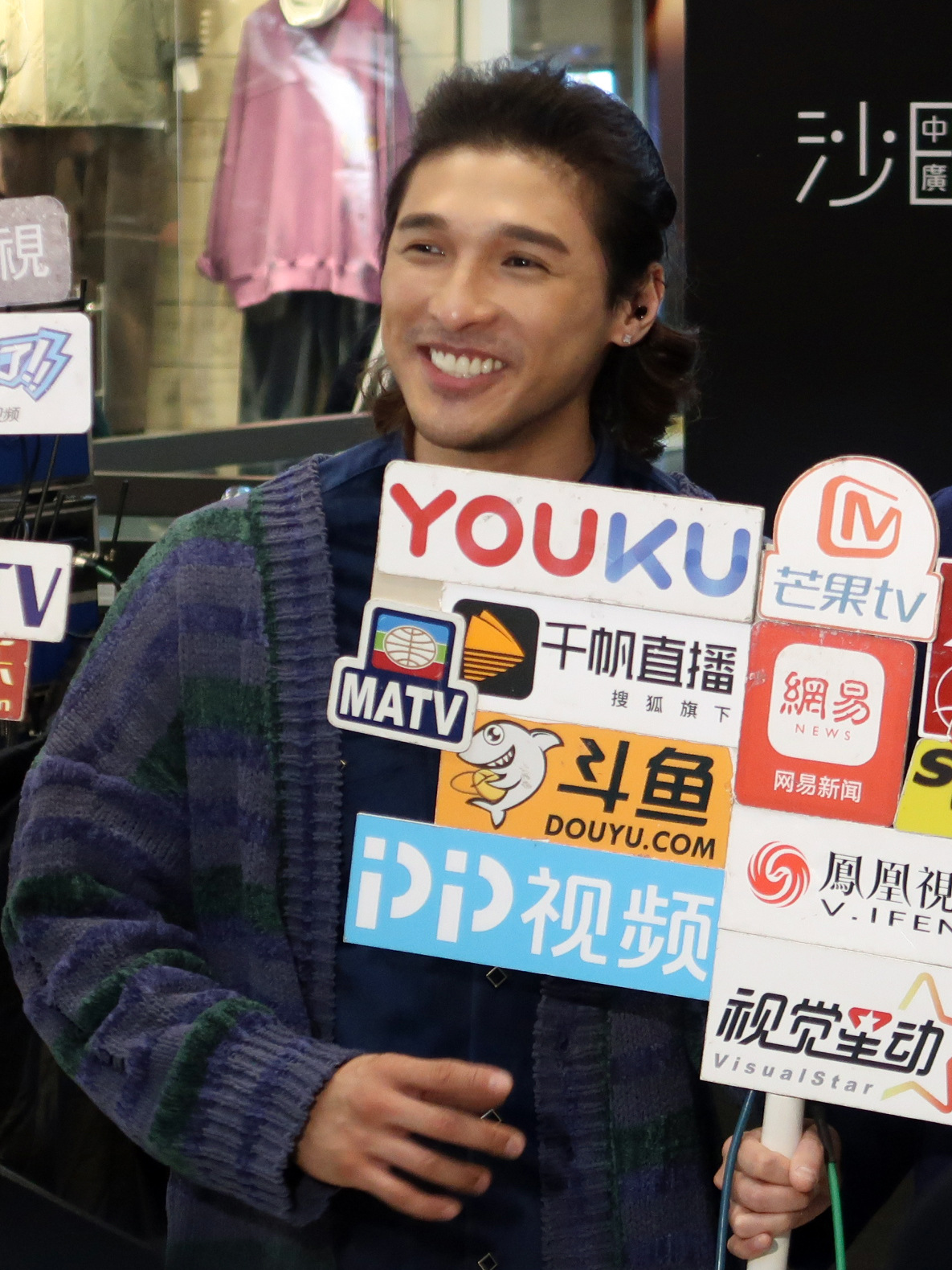
- Wong in 2018
- Born: Wong Tak-him (黃德謙); November 2, 1983 (age 42); Hong Kong
- Occupation: Actor
- Musical career
- Also known as: You Nam, YN
- Genres: Cantopop
- Instruments: Vocals, guitar, piano

Wong Tak-him (黃德謙, born November 2, 1983), better known as Wong You-nam (黃又南) is a Hong Kong actor.

== Filmography ==
- Just One Look (2002)
- The Mummy, Aged 19 (2002)
- Anna in Kungfuland (2003)
- Star Runner (2003)
- A.V. (2005)
- Hooked on You (2007)
- Linger (2008)
- La Lingerie (2008)
- Ip Man (2008)
- Poker King (2009)
- The Jade and the Pearl (2010)
- Gallants (2010)
- Mysterious Island (2011)
- The Midnight After (2014)
- Gangster Payday (2014)
- An Inspector Calls (2015)
- Guia in Love (2015)
- Wong Ka Yan (2015)
- Blue Veins (2016)
- Transcendent (2018)
- Ciao UFO (2019)
- Over My Dead Body (2023)
- Bursting Point (2023)
- Crisis Negotiators (2024)

== Accolades ==
He was nominated for Best New Performer at the 22nd Hong Kong Film Awards for his work on Just One Look and Hollywood Hong Kong, and for Best Supporting Actor at the 44th Hong Kong Film Awards with Ciao UFO.
