= Derek Kwok =

Hong Kong film director

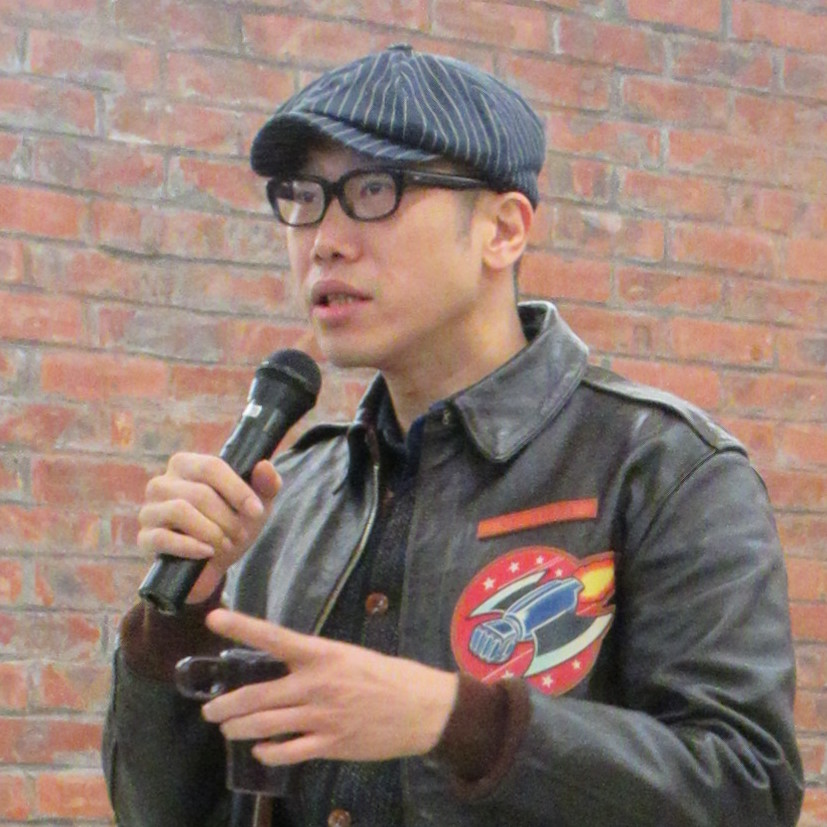
- Kwok in 2017
- Born: October 17, 1976 (age 50); British Hong Kong
- Occupation: Film director

Derek Kwok Chi-kin
- Chinese: 郭子健
Transcriptions
Standard Mandarin
- Hanyu Pinyin: Guō Zǐjiàn
Yue: Cantonese
- Jyutping: gwok3 zi2gin6

Derek Kwok Chi-kin (Chinese: 郭子健, born 10 October 1976) is a Hong Kong film director and screenwriter. He won the 28th Hong Kong Film Awards for Best New Director with his film The Moss.

== Filmography ==
=== Director ===
- 2007 The Pye-Dog
- 2008 The Moss
- 2010 Gallants
- 2010 Frozen
- 2013 Journey to the West: Conquering the Demons
- 2014 As the Light Goes Out
- 2015 Full Strike
- 2017 The Tales of Wukong
- TBD The Unleashed Blaze

=== Screenplay ===
- 2000 Skyline Cruisers
- 2001 2002
- 2002 The Mummy
- 2002 Dry Wood Fierce Fire
- 2004 Leaving Me, Loving You
- 2007 The Pye-Dog
- 2008 The Moss
- 2010 Gallants
- 2010 Frozen
- 2013 Journey to the West: Conquering the Demons
- 2014 As the Light Goes Out
- TBD The Unleashed Blaze
