= List of Hong Kong films of 2025 =

List of Films

This article lists feature-length Hong Kong films theatrically released in 2025.

== Releases ==
Opening		Title	Director	Cast	Genre	Ref.
J A N	2	Four Trails	Robin Lee	—N/a	Documentary, sports	
J A N	11	Remember What I Forgot	Keian Chui	Philip Keung, Fish Liew, Dada Chan, Endy Chow	Drama,comedy	
J A N	28	Hit N Fun	Albert Mak	Louis Koo, Gigi Leung, Louise Wong, Tony Wu, Chrissie Chau, German Cheung, Peter Chan	Action, comedy	
J A N	28	My Best Bet	Andy Lo	Charlene Choi, Louis Cheung, Chu Pak Hong, Kayan9896, Stanley Yau, Renci Yeung, Yeung Wai-lun, Bowie Wu	Comedy	
J A N	28	Queen of Mahjong	Wong Jing, Patrick Kong	Samantha Ko, Kenneth Ma, Carlos Chan, Dada Chan, Jiro Lee	Comedy	
F E B	20	The Way We Talk	Adam Wong	Neo Yau, Chung Suet Ying and Marco Ng	Drama	
F E B	27	Little Red Sweet	Vincent Chow	Simon Yam, Stephy Tang, Jeffrey Ngai, Mimi Kung	Drama	
M A R	7	True Love, for Once in My Life	Siu Koon-ho	Cecilia Yip, Tse Kwan-ho	Drama	
M A R	27	Peg O' My Heart	Nick Cheung	Nick Cheung, Fala Chen, Terrance Lau	Thriller	
A P R	4	The Last Dance (Extended version)	Anselm Chan	Dayo Wong, Michael Hui, Michelle Wai, Chu Pak Hong	Drama	
A P R	17	Smashing Frank	Trevor Choi	Hedwig Tam, Locker Lam, Kaki Sham, Renci Yeung, Ben Yuen, Yeung Wai-lun	Heist	
A P R	24	Montages of a Modern Motherhood	Oliver Chan	Hedwig Tam, Siuyea Lo, Janis Pang, Patra Au, Alice Fung So-bor	Drama	
M A Y	1	Vital Signs	Cheuk Wan-chi	Louis Koo, Neo Yau, Angela Yuen, Poon Chan-leung	Drama	
M A Y	1	The Dumpling Queen	Andrew Lau	Ma Li, Kara Wai, Zhu Yawen	Drama	
M A Y	8	A Gilded Game	Herman Yau	Andy Lau, Ou Hao, Ni Ni	Thriller	
J U N	5	Valley of the Shadow of Death	Jeffrey Lam, Antonio Tam	Anthony Wong, Louisa So, George Au	Drama	
J U N	12	Behind the Shadows	Jonathan Li, Chow Man-yu	Louis Koo, Liu Kuan-ting, Chrissie Chau	Action	
J U N	19	Pavane for an Infant	Chong Keat Aun	Fish Liew, Natalie Hsu, Ben Yuen, Pearlly Chua	Drama	
J U N	21	Fight For Tomorrow	Chan Tai-lee	Patrick Tam, Locker Lam, Ying Chi-yuet, Mark Cheng	Action	
J U L	10	Paws Land	Au Cheuk-man	—N/a	Documentary	
J U L	17	She's Got No Name	Peter Chan	Zhang Ziyi, Eric Wang, Jackson Yee, Mei Ting, Zhao Liying	Drama	
A U G	14	Reborn	Danny Pang	Cheung Siu-fai, Venus Wong, Law Lan	Horror	
A U G	22	My First of May	James Hung	Aaron Kwok, Natalie Hsu, Nina Paw, Gigi Leung, Patrick Tam, Kenji Fan	Drama	
S E P	4	Atonement	Ronald Cheng	Ronald Cheng, Chrissie Chau, Philip Keung	Action	
S E P	11	Operation Hadal	Dante Lam	Huang Xuan, Yu Shi, Zhang Hanyu, Duan Yihong, Wang Junkai, Du Jiang, Li Chen	Action	
S E P	11	The Remnant	Mandrew Kwan	Philip Keung, Fish Liew, Cecilia Yip, Ling Man-lung	Drama	
S E P	11	The Shadow's Edge	Larry Yang	Jackie Chan, Zhang Zifeng, Tony Leung Ka-fai	Action	
S E P	18	Good Game	Dickson Leung	Andrew Lam Man-Chung, Will Or, Yanny Chan, Lo Mang, Amy Lo, Ansonbean, Chloe So, Alice Fung So-bor, Christine Ng, Ng Siu-hin, Jessica Chan	Action, comedy	
S E P	25	Remember Me, Remember Love	Ho Fung	Penny Chan, Snow Suen	Romance	
O C T	1	Sons of the Neon Night	Juno Mak	Takeshi Kaneshiro, Sean Lau, Louis Koo, Tony Leung Ka-fai, Gao Yuanyuan	Thriller	
O C T	3	Measure in Love	Benny Kung	Greg Hsu, Angela Yuen	Romance	
O C T	29	Another World	Tommy Kai Chung Ng	Chung Suet Ying (voice), Hiu-Tung Choi (voice), Louis Cheung (voice), Kay Tse (voice), Will Or (voice), Thaimay (voice)	Animation	
N O V	21	Golden Boy	Joe Chan	Louis Cheung, Rosa Maria Velasco	Action, sports	
N O V	27	Someone Like Me	Tam Wai-ching	Fish Liew, Carlos Chan	Romance	
D E C
D E C	4	Road to Vendetta	Njo Kui Ying	Jeffrey Ngai, Sara Minami, Chu Pak-him, Naoto Takenaka, Rosa Maria Velasco, Takumi Saitoh, Daniel Hong	Action, drama	
D E C	6	Under Current	Alan Mak	Aaron Kwok, Simon Yam, Francis Ng, Alex Fong	Action	
D E C	17	My Date With A Vampire	Robert Chan	Bosco Wong, Karena Ng	Fantasy	
D E C	25	Pass and Goal	Jill Wong Pak Kei	Gigi Leung, Peter Chan, Ling Man-lung, Rachel Leung, Chu Pak Hong, Henry Chan	Comedy, sports	
D E C	31	Back to the Past	Ng Yuen-fai, Jack Lai	Louis Koo, Raymond Lam, Jessica Hsuan, Sonija Kwok, Joyce Tang, Bai Baihe	Science fiction	

== See also ==
- 2025 in Hong Kong
- List of 2025 box office number-one films in Hong Kong
- List of Hong Kong films of 2024
- 43rd Hong Kong Film Awards
