= List of 2025 box office number-one films in Hong Kong =

This is a list of films which placed number-one at the Weekly box office in Hong Kong during 2025.

== Number-one films ==
†	This implies the highest-grossing movie of the year.

#	Date	Film	Weekend gross	Total gross	Ref.
1	January 5, 2025	The Prosecutor	HK$6,374,017	HK$18,519,809	
2	January 12, 2025	The Prosecutor	HK$3,330,551	HK$21,850,360	
3	January 19, 2025	The Prosecutor	HK$2,216,628	HK$24,066,988	
4	January 26, 2025	The Prosecutor	HK$1,824,742	HK$25,891,730	
5	February 2, 2025	Hit N Fun	HK$8,441,481	HK$8,526,841	
6	February 9, 2025	My Best Bet	HK$2,850,871	HK$10,073,855	
7	February 16, 2025	Captain America: Brave New World	HK$9,948,223	HK$9,948,223	
8	February 23, 2025	Ne Zha 2	HK$12,115,948	HK$12,115,948	
9	March 2, 2025	Ne Zha 2	HK$17,448,672	HK$29,564,620	
10	March 9, 2025	Ne Zha 2	HK$11,171,815	HK$40,736,485	
11	March 16, 2025	Ne Zha 2	HK$7,185,653	HK$47,922,138	
12	March 23, 2025	Ne Zha 2	HK$3,941,401	HK$51,863,540	
13	March 30, 2025	Peg O' My Heart	HK$3,241,809	HK$3,261,826	
14	April 6, 2025	A Minecraft Movie	HK$7,519,057	HK$7,519,057	
15	April 13, 2025	A Minecraft Movie	HK$4,408,952	HK$11,928,009	
16	April 20, 2025	A Minecraft Movie	HK$3,852,591	HK$15,780,600	
17	April 27, 2025	A Minecraft Movie	HK$2,507,421	HK$18,288,021	
18	May 4, 2025	Thunderbolts*	HK$11,776,841	HK$11,776,841	
19	May 11, 2025	Thunderbolts*	HK$6,860,247	HK$18,637,088	
20	May 18, 2025	Final Destination Bloodlines	HK$3,050,000	HK$3,260,000	
21	May 25, 2025	Mission: Impossible – The Final Reckoning	HK$16,600,000	HK$24,310,000	
22	June 1, 2025	Mission: Impossible – The Final Reckoning	HK$11,290,000	HK$35,600,000	
23	June 8, 2025	Lilo & Stitch	HK$6,550,000	HK$16,870,000	
24	June 15, 2025	Lilo & Stitch	HK$4,820,000	HK$21,700,000	
25	June 22, 2025	How to Train Your Dragon	HK$4,720,000	HK$8,760,000	
26	June 29, 2025	F1	HK$11,110,000	HK$11,110,000	
27	July 6, 2025	F1	HK$16,070,000	HK$27,180,000	
28	July 13, 2025	F1	HK$10,940,000	HK$38,120,000	
29	July 20, 2025	F1	HK$8,320,000	HK$46,470,000	
30	July 27, 2025	The Fantastic Four: First Steps	HK$10,048,081	HK$10,048,081	
31	August 3, 2025	The Fantastic Four: First Steps	HK$5,289,177	HK$15,367,748	
32	August 10, 2025	F1	HK$5,030,919	HK$62,596,413	
33	August 17, 2025	Demon Slayer: Kimetsu no Yaiba – The Movie: Infinity Castle †	HK$25,532,135	HK$25,532,135	
34	August 24, 2025	Demon Slayer: Kimetsu no Yaiba – The Movie: Infinity Castle †	HK$24,121,905	HK$49,678,305	
35	August 31, 2025	Demon Slayer: Kimetsu no Yaiba – The Movie: Infinity Castle †	HK$16,369,590	HK$66,047,895	
36	September 7, 2025	Demon Slayer: Kimetsu no Yaiba – The Movie: Infinity Castle †	HK$9,508,460	HK$75,556,355	
37	September 14, 2025	Demon Slayer: Kimetsu no Yaiba – The Movie: Infinity Castle †	HK$6,881,287	HK$82,437,642	
38	September 21, 2025	Demon Slayer: Kimetsu no Yaiba – The Movie: Infinity Castle †	HK$4,439,174	HK$86,876,816	
39	September 28, 2025	Chainsaw Man – The Movie: Reze Arc	HK$3,071,363	HK$3,071,363	
40	October 5, 2025	Chainsaw Man – The Movie: Reze Arc	HK$4,951,108	HK$8,028,712	
41	October 12, 2025	Tron: Ares	HK$3,526,355	HK$3,526,355	
42	October 19, 2025	Tron: Ares	HK$2,205,974	HK$5,732,329	
43	October 26, 2025	Chainsaw Man – The Movie: Reze Arc	HK$1,611,874	HK$14,583,926	
44	November 2, 2025	Another World	HK$4,078,346	HK$4,291,063	
45	November 9, 2025	Predator: Badlands	HK$4,205,063	HK$4,205,063	
46	November 16, 2025	Predator: Badlands	HK$3,143,893	HK$7,348,956	
47	November 23, 2025	Wicked: For Good	HK$3,676,779	HK$3,676,779	
48	November 30, 2025	Zootopia 2	HK$15,552,475	HK$15,552,475	
49	December 7, 2025	Zootopia 2	HK$16,034,981	HK$31,587,110	
50	December 14, 2025	Zootopia 2	HK$12,815,324	HK$44,402,478	
51	December 21, 2025	Zootopia 2	HK$8,088,332	HK$52,490,810	
51	December 21, 2025	Zootopia 2	HK$10,114,189	HK$62,604,999	

== Highest-grossing films ==
International film

Hong Kong film

Highest-grossing films of 2025 (In-year releases)
Rank	Title	Distributor	Domestic gross
1	Demon Slayer: Kimetsu no Yaiba – The Movie: Infinity Castle	Crunchyroll / Sony	HK$97,600,936
2	Back to the Past	One Cool / Intercontinental	HK$84,044,405
3	Zootopia 2	Disney	HK$69,531,373
4	F1	Universal	HK$68,956,949
5	Ne Zha 2	Emperor / Intercontinental / Mandarin / Sil-Metropole	HK$59,880,336
6	Mission: Impossible – The Final Reckoning	Intercontinental / Paramount	HK$51,563,598
7	Lilo & Stitch	Disney	HK$30,109,452
8	Jurassic World Rebirth	Universal	HK$29,972,902
9	Thunderbolts*	Disney	HK$22,792,430
10	A Minecraft Movie	Universal	HK$20,483,190

Top-grossing Hong Kong films of 2025
Rank	Title	Distributor	Domestic gross
1	Back to the Past	One Cool / Intercontinental	HK$84,044,405
2	Another World	Edko	HK$15,115,178
3	Hit N Fun	Edko	HK$13,513,246
4	Peg O' My Heart	Golden Scene	HK$12,183,983
5	The Way We Talk	One Cool	HK$12,089,556
6	Sons of the Neon Night	13CC	HK$11,074,092
7	My Best Bet	Media Asia / Intercontinental	HK$10,943,673
8	Golden Boy	Intercontinental	HK$9,793,935
9	Vital Signs	Edko / One Cool	HK$9,205,475
10	Under Current	Emperor	HK$6,280,126

== See also ==
- 2025 in Hong Kong
- List of Hong Kong films of 2025
- List of 2024 box office number-one films in Hong Kong

Preceded by 2024 Box office number-one films	Box office number-one films 2025	Succeeded by 2026 Box office number-one films
