= 44th Hong Kong Film Awards =

2026 Hong Kong Film Awards

- Official poster
- Date: 19 April 2026
- Site: Hong Kong Cultural Centre; Tsim Sha Tsui, Kowloon
- Organized by: Hong Kong Film Awards Association
- Official website: Hong Kong Film Awards

Highlights
- Best Film: Ciao UFO
- Best Director: Patrick Leung; Ciao UFO
- Best Actor: Tony Leung Ka-fai; The Shadow's Edge
- Best Actress: Fish Liew; Someone Like Me
- Most awards: Sons of the Neon Night (8)
- Most nominations: Sons of the Neon Night (12)

Television coverage
- Channel: ViuTV
- Network: HK Television Entertainment

The 44th Hong Kong Film Awards (Chinese: 第44屆香港電影金像獎) honors the best Hong Kong films of 2025. Organized by the Hong Kong Film Awards Association, the ceremony took place at the Hong Kong Cultural Centre in Tsim Sha Tsui, Kowloon on 19 April 2026.

== Winners and nominees ==
Nominees were announced on 10 February 2026.

Winners are listed first, highlighted in boldface, and indicated with a double dagger (‡).

**Best Film**: **Ciao UFO – Amy Chin and Bonnie Wong, producers** ‡; Another World – Polly Yeung and Chan Gin-kai, producers; Sons of the Neon Night – Juno Mak and Catherine Hun, producers; Back to the Past – Louis Koo and Tang Wai-but, producers; She's Got No Name – Peter Chan, producer	**Best Director**: **Patrick Leung – Ciao UFO** ‡; Shu Qi – Girl; Tommy Ng – Another World; Jonathan Li, Chou Man-yu – Behind the Shadows; Peter Chan – She's Got No Name
**Best Screenplay**: **Ciao UFO – Kong Ho-yan, Amy Chin** ‡; Unidentified Murder – Kwok Ka-hei, Jack Lee, Ho Siu-hong, Devon Choi; Girl – Shu Qi; Another World – Polly Yeung; Behind the Shadows – Chou Man-yu	**Best Actor**: **Tony Leung Ka-fai – The Shadow's Edge** ‡; Louis Koo – Behind the Shadows; Louis Cheung – Golden Boy; Louis Koo – Back to the Past; Carlos Chan – Someone Like Me
**Best Actress**: **Fish Liew – Someone Like Me** ‡; Ma Li – The Dumpling Queen; Natalie Hsu – My First of May; Zhang Ziyi – She's Got No Name; Fala Chen – Peg O' My Heart	**Best Supporting Actor**: **Alex To – Sons of the Neon Night** ‡; Peter Chan – Unidentified Murder; Ben Yuen – The Dumpling Queen; Wong You-nam – Ciao UFO; Locker Lam – Fight for Tomorrow
**Best Supporting Actress**: **Michelle Wai – Ciao UFO** ‡; Elizabeth Tang – Girlfriends; Kara Wai – The Dumpling Queen; Nina Paw – Sons of the Neon Night; Joyce Tang – Back to the Past	**Best New Performer**: **Elizabeth Tang – Girlfriends** ‡; Ali Lee – Golden Boy; Li Zhekun – The Shadow's Edge; Chau Tsz Yuet – Pass and Goal; Kuku So Tsz Yan – For Alice
**Best Cinematography**: **Sion Michel, Richard Bluck – Sons of the Neon Night** ‡; Yu Jing-pin – Girl; Leung Ming-kai – Ciao UFO; Kenny Tse – Back to the Past; Jake Pollock – She's Got No Name	**Best Film Editing**: **William Chang – Sons of the Neon Night** ‡; Derek Hui, Joe Zhou, To To – Ciao UFO; Zhang Yibo – The Shadow's Edge; Wong Hoi, Kenny Lok – Back to the Past; William Chang, Zhang Yibo – She's Got No Name
**Best Art Direction**: **Juno Mak, Yee Chung-man, Ambrose Chow, Jona Sees – Sons of the Neon Night** ‡; Step C. – Another World; Man Lim-chung, Jasper Tsang – Measure in Love; Lam Wai-kin – Back to the Past; Sun Li, Lau Man-hung – She's Got No Name	**Best Costume & Makeup Design**: **SoMad, Uma Wang – Sons of the Neon Night** ‡; Man Lim-chung, So Chun-yan – Measure in Love; Cheung Siu-hong – Back to the Past; Dora Ng – She's Got No Name; Boey Wong – Peg O' My Heart
**Best Action Choreography**: **Su Hang – The Shadow's Edge** ‡; Jack Wong – Golden Boy; Tang Sui-wa, Xiong Xinxin – Sons of the Neon Night; Sammo Hung – Back to the Past; Ken Law – Good Game	**Best Original Film Score**: **Ryuichi Sakamoto, Nate Connelly – Sons of the Neon Night** ‡; Chou Liting, CMgroovy, Vicky Fung – Another World; Wan Pin Chu – Measure in Love; Tsui Chin-hung – Ciao UFO; Chan Kwong-wing, Kay Chan, Christopher Lai – Back to the Past
**Best Original Film Song**: **"Wah Fu One" from Ciao UFO – Music by Tsui Chin-hung; lyrics by Leung Pak-kin; performed by Feanna Wong** ‡; "Ordinary People" from Girlfriends – Music, lyrics, and performed by Panther Chan; "Until We Meet Again" from Another World – Music and lyrics by Vicky Fung; performed by Claudia Ng; "Blink of Eternity" from Measure in Love – Music by Wan Pin Chu and JJ Lin; lyrics by Yvonne Lin; performed by JJ Lin; "I Can Never Fall Asleep" from Peg O' My Heart – Music by Mark Lui; lyrics by Zhu Lin; performed by Nick Cheung	**Best Sound Design**: **Nopawat Likitwong, Poolpetch Hatthakitkosol, Dhanarat Dhitirojana – Sons of the Neon Night** ‡; Yiu Chun-hin, Cheung Man-hoi – Another World; Wang Yanwei, Belle Lau – The Shadow's Edge; Terry Shek – Back to the Past; James Ashton – Operation Hadal
**Best Visual Effects**: **Enoch Chan, Yu Yat-tung, Chris Chow, Felix Lai – Sons of the Neon Night** ‡; Water Chan – Ciao UFO; Dave Kwok Wai Ting, Jules Lin, Yee Kwok-leung, Kwok Tai – Back to the Past; Leung Chung-man – Good Game; Dennis Yeung (1), Dennis Yeung (2) – Peg O' My Heart	**Best New Director**: **Shu Qi – Girl** ‡; Tommy Ng – Another World; Kung Siu-ping – Measure in Love; Juno Mak – Sons of the Neon Night; Kwok Ka-hei, Jack Lee – Unidentified Murder
**Professional Achievement**: **Yiu Man-kei**	**Lifetime Achievement**: **John Chu Ka-yan**

== Shortlist exclusions ==
Four films were excluded from the official shortlist for the awards without explanation from the organizers, which has raised questions from the local film industry.

On January 13, 2026, the Hong Kong Film Awards announced the "List of Films to be Officially Released in Hong Kong in 2025" for the first round of voting. The eligibility criteria stated that any Hong Kong film that has been publicly screened in Hong Kong for the first time from January 1 to December 31, 2025, and has been screened for no less than five times in seven consecutive days, is automatically eligible to participate in the '44th Hong Kong Film Awards'. Filmmakers do not submit their films for consideration, nor can they with draw. However, it was reported that four films—Valley of the Shadow of Death, Finch & Midland, Vital Signs, and Mother Bhumi—that should have been eligible for nomination were missing. At least two of the missing films were on a reference list circulated to HKFA committee members before being removed in subsequent revisions. All four films feature cast members that have been the subject of political or criminal controversy in Hong Kong or mainland China. The Hong Kong Film Awards Association refused to comment on the incident.

=== Films with multiple nominations and wins ===
Films with multiple nominations
Nominations	Film
12	Sons of the Neon Night
11	Back to the past
10	Ciao UFO
8	Another World
7	She's Got No Name
5	The Shadow's Edge
5	Measure in Love
4	Girl
4	Peg O' My Heart
3	Behind the Shadows
3	Girlfriends
3	Golden Boy
3	Unidentified Murder
3	The Dumpling Queen
2	Good game
2	Someone Like Me

Film with multiple wins
Wins	Films
8	Sons of the Neon Night
5	Ciao UFO
2	The Shadow's Edge
