= An Abandoned Team =

2024 Hong Kong film by Tomas Lee

- Theatrical poster
- 得寵先生
- Directed by: Tomas Lee Chi-wai; Daniel Ho Ying-ngai
- Starring: Lawrence Cheng, Amy Lo, Jay Fung, Bonnie Wong
- Cinematography: Szeto Yat Lui Danny
- Production companies: Media Asia Film; One Cool Film Production
- Distributed by: Media Asia Film
- Release dates: 7 November 2024 (Hong Kong Asian Film Festival); 28 November 2024 (Hong Kong, Macau)
- Running time: 107 minutes
- Country: Hong Kong
- Language: Cantonese
- Box office: more than HKD$2.5 million

An Abandoned Team or Alone No More (Chinese: 得寵先生 or earlier 狗轉人生) is a 2024 Hong Kong drama film directed by Tomas Lee and Daniel Ho, and starring Lawrence Cheng, Amy Lo, Jay Fung and Bonnie Wong. The film is produced by Media Asia Film and One Cool Film Production, along with Film Development Fund's 4 million dollar investment.

== Plot ==
Uncle Gai is a 60-year-old hot-tempered loner who has been living a solitary life. His marriage ended in failure, and his distant relationship with his daughter (played by Fish Yu), leaving him increasingly isolated. After retiring, he feels that life has lost its meaning. One day, overwhelmed by despair, he decides to end his life by going to the mountains. However, just as he is about to give up, he is discovered by a stray dog named Roast Piggy, who leads animal volunteer Una (played by Amy Lo) to find him and rescue him. This unexpected encounter becomes a turning point in Uncle Gai’s life.

Initially, Uncle Gai has a strong dislike for dogs, but the actions of Roast Piggy begin to change his perspective on animals. Encouraged by Una, he starts volunteering at her animal shelter, helping to care for abandoned stray animals. Over time, Uncle Gai finds a new sense of purpose and meaning in life through his work with these animals. He begins to open up emotionally and, with Una's support, tries to repair his long-broken relationship with his daughter. Just when Uncle Gai believes that his life is getting back on track and things are improving, a shocking tragedy strikes......

== Cast ==
- Lawrence Cheng as Uncle Gai, a 60-year-old bad-tempered loner.
- Amy Lo as Una, an animal volunteer.
- Little as Roast Piggy, a stray dog.
- Jay Fung as Chung Man, Una's boyfriend.
- Bonnie Wong as Toby, a veterinary nurse and Una's friend.
- Fish Liew as Gai's daughter
- Ben Yuen as Master Sek, a char siu butcher.
- Patra Au as Una's mother

In addition, Kenny Wong, Ansonbean, and Zaneta Cheng, the daughter of Lawrence Cheng, make cameo appearances in the film.

== Reception ==
A 3 out of 5 stars review by Edmund Lee in the South China Morning Post wrote that the film was "a corny but wholesome story about a cantankerous old man whose bond with a dog opens a door to more new connections".

Writing for The Guardian, Cath Clarke gave the film 3 out of 5 stars and described it as "a conventional heart-tugger, pushing its sentimental message about the benefits to mind and body of pet ownership, and making a point about social isolation among older people".

Keith Ho, writing for HK01 considered the film as "uplifting and heartwarming", which effectively explores the deep connections between humans and animals and features surprising performances, particularly from the dog actor Little, and successfully addressing complex emotional themes that resonate with audiences.

Christy Yiu of Hong Kong Economic Times found the film to be poignant and meaningful, exploring the redemptive bond between a reclusive elderly man and a stray dog, ultimately emphasizing themes of love and connection, making it a worthwhile watch despite its quieter presence among larger releases.

== Awards and nominations ==
Year	Award	Category	Nominee	Result	Ref.
2025	43rd Hong Kong Film Awards	Best New Director	Tomas Lee, Daniel Ho	Nominated	
