= Girlfriends (2025 film) =

2025 Cantonese LGBT film

- Festival release poster
- Traditional Chinese: 女孩不平凡
- Literal meaning: Girl is extraordinary
- Directed by: Tracy Choi
- Written by: Shiu Wa Lou; Sebrina Cheng
- Produced by: Estela Valdivieso Chen; Jacqueline Liu
- Starring: Fish Liew; Jennifer Yu; Elizabeth Tang; Han Ning; Natalie Hsu; Eliz Lum
- Cinematography: Simmy Sin Mei Cheong
- Edited by: Chen Ching Lei
- Music by: Ellison Lau
- Production companies: Lumière Film Production; Serendipity Films; Playhouse Limited
- Distributed by: Golden Scene
- Release dates: 20 September 2025 (Busan); 5 March 2026 (Hong Kong and Macau); 27 March 2026 (Taiwan)
- Running time: 101 minutes
- Countries: Macau; Taiwan; Hong Kong
- Languages: Cantonese; Mandarin
- Budget: US$1.024 million

Girlfriends (Chinese: 女孩不平凡) is a 2025 Cantonese-language coming-of-age, LGBTQ romance film directed by Tracy Choi. The film starring Fish Liew, Jennifer Yu, Elizabeth Tang, Han Ning, Natalie Hsu and Eliz Lum, chronicles a woman's growth through three love stories at ages 17, 22 and 34.

The film had its world premiere at the 30th Busan International Film Festival in the 'Visions – Asia' section on September 20, 2025. Elizabeth Tang Tao was nominated for Golden Horse Award for Best Supporting Actress at the 62nd Golden Horse Awards to be held in Taipei on November 22, 2025.

== Synopsis ==
Lok, a 34-year-old filmmaker from Macau, faces creative block and personal pressure in Hong Kong. Her career has stalled and her girlfriend Bei urges her toward a conventional married life. Grappling with burnout and indecision, Lok revisits her past identities: "Choi" at 22 in Taiwan, caught in a fading relationship and uncertain future, and "Yan" at 17 in Macau, where a first love exposed the gap between idealism and reality.

These reflections made Lok confront the ongoing tension between artistic ambition and emotional stability, questioning whether to embrace an ordinary life or continue chasing something extraordinary.

== Plot ==
In 2024 Hong Kong, 34-year-old director Tsui Lok Yan, known as Lok, lives with her girlfriend Bei. Despite having some career and financial pressure, the two generally have a good relationship. Lok has submitted a script to film executives, but she is pressured to modify the script, and eventually is told the film will be put on hold indefinitely. Bei's impulsiveness further frustrates Lok, as Bei puts down a deposit for a house in Macau where Lok is from, constantly works odd jobs, and sets up a meeting for them to marry a gay couple and have children in an arranged lavender marriage. Lok's avoidant nature and unwillingness to be tied down similarly frustrates Bei. After arguing with Bei, Lok reflects on their relationship and recalls her past.

In 2010 Taipei, Tsui Lok Yan, then known as Choi, is studying at university while living with her older girlfriend Kai Ching, with whom she enjoys a passionate physical relationship. Choi is frustrated by how her groupmates are unwilling to take a strong stance in their graduation project, but Kai Ching merely tells her to ignore them. Eventually, under the encouragement of her junior named Fei-fei, Choi decides to remain firm on her position and complete the graduation project on her own. Choi and Fei-fei become close. Choi does a space and alien-themed photoshoot of Fei-fei, but does not explain why. Fei-fei becomes upset knowing that Choi will leave Taiwan and kisses her.

When Kai Ching tells Choi that she has gotten a casino hostess job in Macau so they can stay together after Choi's graduation, Choi becomes frustrated and questions why Kai Ching did not make the decision with her. Kai Ching attempts several times to talk about the future with Choi, who avoids answering; this culminates in an intense argument between them, which ends with them having hate sex. Choi's parents come visit Choi in Taipei and encourage her to return to Macau, while ignoring Choi and Kai Ching's relationship. Choi leaves Taipei without telling Kai Ching.

In 2006 Macau, Tsui Lok Yan, then known as Yan, is a final-year secondary school student who has been guaranteed entrance to the University of Macau because of her academics. Yan by accident becomes close with Faye, the sister of one of her friends on the school debate team. Faye encourages Yan to be herself and the two spend more time together. Yan becomes encouraged to take the public university examinations to try getting into a university in Taiwan so she can spend time with Faye, who plans on completing a Master's degree in Taiwan. However, when Yan kisses Faye, she does not reciprocate. Yan is accepted to a university in Taiwan, but Faye reveals she will be staying in Macau.

In 2024, Lok returns to Macau to visit her family. She runs into Faye, who now has a child. Faye expresses her support for Lok's film career. Lok changes her mind, and drags Bei out of the restaurant where she is discussing the lavender marriage with the gay couple. Lok proposes to Bei, wanting to do ordinary things and be better with her.

== Cast ==
- Fish Liew as Lok
- Jennifer Yu as Bei
- Elizabeth Tang as Choi
- Han Ning as Kai Ching
- Natalie Hsu as Yan
- Eliz Lum as Faye
- Candy Man as Mother
- Kin Tak Chan as Father

== Production ==
The film was shortlisted for the 23rd Hong Kong Asian Film Financing Forum (HAF23), one of the projects of the Hong Kong International Film Festival Society, and the Work-in-Progress Program (WIP).

The film was made with a production budget of US$1.024 million.

== Release ==
Girlfriends had its world premiere at the 30th Busan International Film Festival in the 'Visions – Asia' section on 20 September 2025.

The film was released on 5 March 2026 in Hong Kong and Macau, and on 27 March 2026 in Taiwan.

The film competed in the Uncaged Competition – For Best Feature Film, section of the 25th New York Asian Film Festival on 23 July 2026 and had its North American Premiere.

== Accolades ==
The film competed for various Vision Awards at Busan International Film Festival.

| Award | Date of ceremony | Category | Recipient(s) | Result | Ref. |
|---|---|---|---|---|---|
| Busan International Film Festival | September 26, 2025 | Vision Awards | Girlfriends | Nominated | |
| Golden Horse Awards | November 22, 2025 | Best Supporting Actress | Elizabeth Tang | Nominated | |
| Hong Kong Film Directors' Guild Awards | March 22, 2026 | Best New Performer | Elizabeth Tang | Won | |
| Hong Kong Film Awards | April 19, 2026 | Best Supporting Actress | Elizabeth Tang | Nominated | |
| Hong Kong Film Awards | April 19, 2026 | Best New Performer | Elizabeth Tang | Won | |
| Hong Kong Film Awards | April 19, 2026 | Best Original Film Song | Panther Chan "Ordinary People" | Nominated | |
| New York Asian Film Festival | July 26, 2026 | Uncaged Competition – For Best Feature Film | Girlfriends | Pending | |
