= Jennifer Yu (actress) =

Hong Kong actress

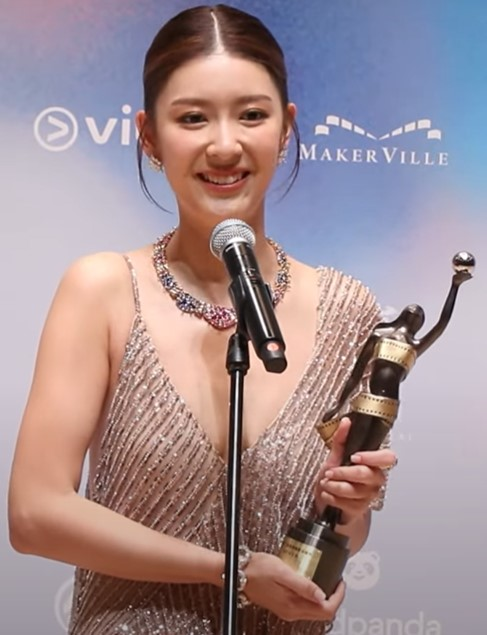
- Yu at the 42nd Hong Kong Film Awards on 14 April 2024
- Born: 5 July 1993 (age 33); British Hong Kong
- Occupations: Actress; singer; model
- Years active: 2011–present
- Spouse: Tim Luk (m. 2020)
- Children: 2
- Relatives: Zoe Yu (sister)

Chinese name
- Chinese: 余香凝
- Hanyu Pinyin: Yú Xiāngníng

Jennifer Yu Heung-ying (Chinese: 余香凝; born 5 July 1993) is a Hong Kong actress, singer, and model.

== Early life and career ==
Jennifer Yu was born on 5 July 1993 in Hong Kong. She has a younger sister, Zoe Yu, who is also a model. Yu attended Po Leung Kuk Dr. Jimmy Wong Chi-Ho (Tin Sum Valley) Primary School and Immaculate Heart of Mary College.

Yu became a model in 2011, signed under One Cool JamCast, appearing in a number of advertisements.

In 2016, she played the role of Ling in drama film Sisterhood, which earned her a Best New Performer nomination in the 36th Hong Kong Film Awards.

In 2017, she debuted as a singer, releasing her first single.

In 2024, she won Best Actress at the 42nd Hong Kong Film Awards for her role as Kay in In Broad Daylight.

== Personal life ==
Yu began dating actor Carlos Chan after their collaboration in the 2014 television series A Dream Comes True 2014. Although Chan mentioned plans of marriage in an interview with Ming Pao in March 2018, their breakup was announced in June 2018.

Yu announced in October 2020 that she would be marrying her boyfriend, Tim Luk, who is not from the entertainment industry, in November. The following month, Yu announced that she was pregnant. Their daughter, Clare, was born in May 2021. Their second child, a son, was born in September 2023.

Yu became best friends with Fish Liew after collaborating in Sisterhood.

== Selected filmography ==
- Sisterhood (2016)
- Tracey (2018)
- Distinction (2018)
- Men on the Dragon (2018)
- Septet: The Story of Hong Kong (2020)
- Single Papa (暖男爸爸) drama (2020)
- Far Far Away (2021)
- Over My Dead Body (2023)
- In Broad Daylight (2023)
- Table for Six 2 (2024)
- Papa (2024)
- Girlfriends (2025 Premiere at the Busan in September)

== Awards and nominations ==
Year	Award	Category	Nominated work	Result
2016	International Film Festival & Awards Macao	Best New Young Actress or Actor	Sisterhood	Won
2017	Chinese Film Media Awards	Best New Performer	Sisterhood	Nominated
2017	Hong Kong Film Critics Society Awards	Best Actress	Sisterhood	Nominated
2017	Hong Kong Film Awards	Best New Performer	Sisterhood	Nominated
2019	Hong Kong Film Awards	Best Actress	Distinction	Nominated
2019	Hong Kong Film Awards	Best Supporting Actress	Man on the Dragon	Nominated
2019	Hong Kong Film Awards	Best Original Film Song	Distinction	Nominated
2019	Hong Kong Film Critics Society Awards	Best Actress	Distinction	Nominated
2022	59th Golden Horse Awards	Best Supporting Actress	Far Far Away	Nominated
2023	29th Hong Kong Film Critics Society Awards	Best Actress	Far Far Away	Nominated
2023	41st Hong Kong Film Awards	Best Supporting Actress	Far Far Away	Nominated
2023	60th Golden Horse Awards	Best Leading Actress	In Broad Daylight	Nominated
2024	30th Hong Kong Film Critics Society Awards	Best Actress	In Broad Daylight	Won
2024	19th Hong Kong Film Directors' Guild Annual Awards	Best Actress	In Broad Daylight	Won
2024	42nd Hong Kong Film Awards	Best Actress	In Broad Daylight	Won
