= Sisterhood (2016 film) =

2016 Macanese-Hong Kong film by Tracy Choi

- Theatrical release poster
- Chinese: 骨妹
- Jyutping: Gwat1 Mui6
- Directed by: Tracy Choi
- Written by: Au Kin-yee
- Produced by: Tang Wai-but; Ding Yuin-shan; Jacqueline Liu
- Starring: Gigi Leung; Fish Liew; Jennifer Yu
- Cinematography: Cheong Sin-mei
- Edited by: Tracy Choi
- Music by: Ellison Lau
- Production company: One Cool Film Production
- Distributed by: One Cool Pictures
- Release dates: December 12, 2016 (IFFAM); February 23, 2017 (Hong Kong)
- Running time: 97 minutes
- Countries: Macau; Hong Kong
- Languages: Cantonese; Mandarin
- Box office: US$160,000

Sisterhood (Chinese: 骨妹; Jyutping: Gwaat Mui) is a 2016 drama film directed by Tracy Choi and starring Gigi Leung, Fish Liew and Jennifer Yu. A Macanese-Hong Kong co-production, the film had its North American premiere at the Toronto LGBT Film Festival on 28 May 2017.

== Premise ==
In the 1990s, Sei finds herself a job at a massage parlor in Macau and befriends Ling, an older woman who is a single mother. On the eve of Macau's handover to China, they have a fight which sets them on separate paths: Sei moves to Taiwan to marry a guesthouse owner while Ling stays in Macau with her infant son. Fifteen years later, Sei, now in her late thirties, learns that Ling has died. She decides to return to Macau to revisit her past, in a familiar yet very different Macau.

== Cast ==
- Gigi Leung as Sei
- Fish Liew as Teenage Sei
- Jennifer Yu as Ling
- Lee Lee-zen as Chen Chung
- Kevin Chu as Teenage Chen Chung
- Stephanie Che as #38
- Panther Chan as Teenage #38
- Teresa Mak as #44
- Eliz Lao as Teenage #44
- Elena Kong as Lai
- Dino Acconci as Massage parlor manager
- Louis Castro as Bakery boss
- Terence Siufay as Restaurant owner
- Ai Wai

== Soundtrack ==
=== Featured songs ===
No.	Title	Writer(s)	Performer	Length
1.	"Farewell to Yesterday 告別昨天"	Panther Chan, MJ	Panther Chan

== Reception ==
=== Accolades ===
Award	Category	Recipient and nominee	Result	Ref
1st Macao International Film Festival and Awards	Audience Choice Award	Sisterhood	Won	
1st Macao International Film Festival and Awards	Best New Young Actress	Jennifer Yu	Won	
23rd Hong Kong Film Critics Society Award	Best Actress	Fish Liew	Nominated	
23rd Hong Kong Film Critics Society Award	Best new performer	Jennifer Yu	Nominated	
12th Osaka Asian Film Festival	Most Promising Talent Award	Fish Liew	Won	
36th Hong Kong Film Awards	Best Supporting Actress	Fish Liew	Nominated	
36th Hong Kong Film Awards	Best New Performer	Jennifer Yu	Nominated	
17th Chinese Film Media Awards	Best Supporting Actress	Fish Liew	Nominated	
17th Chinese Film Media Awards	Best New Performer	Jennifer Yu	Nominated	
2017 Inside Out | Toronto LGBT Film Festival	Audience Award for Best Narrative Feature	Sisterhood	Won	
