= 風林火山 =

風林火山, meaning "Wind, Forest, Fire, Mountain", may refer to:

- Fūrin Kazan (TV series), 2007 Japanese Taiga television drama series
- Sons of the Neon Night, 2025 Hong Kong crime thriller film

== See also ==
- Fūrinkazan (disambiguation)
