= Little (dog) =

Little (2016–2022) was a dog actor from Hong Kong, best known for playing the role of "Roast Piggy" in the film "An Abandoned Team". Little died of cancer in 2022, before the film's release. Little was a Tang dog.
