= 36th Hong Kong Film Awards =

2017 film awards

- Poster
- Date: 9 April 2017
- Site: Hong Kong Cultural Centre
- Hosted by: Ronald Cheng
- Organised by: Hong Kong Film Awards Association Ltd

Highlights
- Best Picture: Trivisa
- Best Direction: Frank Hui, Jevons Au and Vicky Wong Wai-Kit; Trivisa
- Best Actor: Gordon Lam; Trivisa
- Best Actress: Kara Wai; Happiness
- Most awards: Trivisa (5)
- Most nominations: Soul Mate (12)

Television coverage
- Channel: TVB Jade
- Network: TVB

The 36th Hong Kong Film Awards presentation ceremony took place at Hong Kong Cultural Centre on 9 April 2017.

== Winners and nominees ==
Winners are listed first, highlighted in boldface, and indicated with a double dagger (‡).

**Best Film**: **Johnnie To, Yau Nai-hoi — Trivisa**‡; Peter Chan, Jojo Hui — Soul Mate; Stephen Chow, Y. Y. Kong — The Mermaid; Bill Kong, Ivy Ho, Jiang Ping — Cold War 2; Chan Hing-kai, O Sing-pui — Weeds on Fire	**Best Director**: **Frank Hui, Jevons Au, Vicky Wong — Trivisa**‡; Wong Chun — Mad World; Derek Tsang — Soul Mate; Johnnie To — Three; Stephen Chow — The Mermaid
**Best Screenplay**: **Loong Man Hong, Thomas Ng, Mak Tin Shu — Trivisa**‡; Florence Chan — Mad World; Lam Wing-sum, Li Yuan, Xu Yi-meng, Wu Nan — Soul Mate; Stephen Chow — The Mermaid; Longman Leung, Sunny Luk, Jack Ng — Cold War 2	**Best Actor**: **Gordon Lam — Trivisa**‡; Shawn Yue — Mad World; Francis Ng — Shed Skin Papa; Richie Jen — Trivisa; Tony Leung Ka-fai — Cold War 2
**Best Actress**: **Kara Wai — Happiness**‡; Zhou Dongyu — Soul Mate; Ma Sichun — Soul Mate; Paw Hee-ching — Show Me Your Love; Tang Wei — Book of Love	**Best Supporting Actor**: **Eric Tsang — Mad World**‡; Paul Chun — Book of Love; Ng Man-tat — The Menu; Philip Keung — Trivisa; Liu Kai-chi — Weeds on Fire
**Best Supporting Actress**: **Elaine Jin — Mad World**‡; Charmaine Fong — Mad World; Zhang Yuqi — The Mermaid; Fish Liew — Sisterhood; Janice Man — Cold War 2	**Best New Performer**: **Tony Wu — Weeds on Fire**‡; James Ng — Happiness; Lin Yun — The Mermaid; Jennifer Yu — Sisterhood; Hedwig Tam — Weeds on Fire
**Best Cinematography**: **Peter Pau, Cao Yu — See You Tomorrow**‡; Jake Pollock, Jing-Ping Yu — Soul Mate; Cheng Siu-Keung, To Hung Mo — Three; Jason Kwan — Cold War 2; O Sing-pui — Weeds on Fire	**Best Film Editing**: **Allen Leung, David Richardson — Trivisa**‡; Derek Hui, Li Dianshi, Zhou Xiaolin, Tan Xiang-Yuan — Soul Mate; Jordan Goldman, Ron Chan — Cold War 2; David Richardson — Operation Mekong; David Wu — See You Tomorrow
**Best Art Direction**: **Alfred Yau — See You Tomorrow**‡; Zhai Tao — Soul Mate; Silver Cheung, Fion Lee, Wu Zhen, Chong Kwok-wing — Sword Master; Daniel Fu — The Monkey King 2; Chan Kam Ho Raymond — The Mermaid	**Best Costume Make Up Design**: **Kenneth Yee, Dora Ng — The Monkey King 2**‡; Dora Ng — Soul Mate; Stanley Cheung — Sword Master; William Chang, Lui Fung-shan — League of Gods; William Chang, Cheung Siu-hong — See You Tomorrow
**Best Action Choreography**: **Stephen Tung — Operation Mekong**‡; Yuen Bun, Dion Lam — Sword Master; Sammo Hung — Call of Heroes; Chin Ka Lok — Cold War 2; Sammo Hung — The Monkey King 2	**Best Original Film Score**: **Peter Kam, Yusuke Hatano — Soul Mate**‡; Yusuke Hatano — Mad World; Peter Kam — Cold War 2; Day Tai — Weeds on Fire; Nathaniel Méchaly — See You Tomorrow
**Best Original Film Song**: **"Anthem Of Shatin Martins" — Weeds on Fire**‡; Composer: Day Tai; Lyrics: Saville Chan; Performer: Supper Moment; "(It's Not A Crime) It's Just What We Do" — Soul Mate; Composer: Leah Dou; Lyrics: Leah Dou; Performer:Leah Dou; "Wu Di" — The Mermaid; Composer: Stephen Chow; Lyrics: Stephen Chow; Performer: Deng Chao; "Better Tomorrow" — Happiness; Composer: Yusuke Hatano; Lyrics: Yusuke Hatano; Performer: Yusuke Hatano; "Keep Me By Your Side" — See You Tomorrow; Composer: Tang Han-xiao; Lyrics: Tang Han-xiao; Performer: Eason Chan	**Best Sound Design**: **Kinson Tsang, George Lee — Cold War 2**‡; Kinson Tsang, George Lee, Yiu Chun-hin, Lai Chi-hung — Sword Master; Yin Jay — The Monkey King 2; Nopawat Likitwong, Kaikangwol Rungsakorn, Sarunyu Nurnsai, Stan Yau — Operation Mekong; Robert Mackenzie — See You Tomorrow
**Best Visual Effects**: **Luke Jung, Kim Sung-hoon, Kim Chan-soo, Kim Chul-min — The Monkey King 2**‡; Luke Jung — Sword Master; Ken Law, Lee In-ho, Kang Tae-gyun, Marco Ng — The Mermaid; Yee Kwok-leung, Raymond Leung — Cold War 2; Yee Kwok-leung, Felix Lai, Kang Tae-gyun — Operation Mekong	**Best New Director**: **Wong Chun — Mad World**‡; Derek Tsang — Soul Mate; Jazz Boon — Line Walker; Andy Lo — Happiness; Steve Chan — Weeds on Fire
**Best Film from Mainland and Taiwan**: **Godspeed** (Taiwan) ‡; Chongqing Hot Pot (China); The Road to Mandalay (Taiwan); Mr. Six (China); I Am Not Madame Bovary (China)	**Lifetime Achievement**: **Fong Yim-fun**‡
**Professional Achievement**: **Yuen Tai-yung**‡	**Best Dressed**: **Shawn Yue**‡; **Elaine Jin**‡
