= Fūrinkazan (disambiguation) =

Fūrinkazan may refer to:

- Fūrinkazan, a popularized version of the war banner used by the Sengoku period Japanese daimyō Takeda Shingen
- Samurai Banners (titled Fūrin Kazan in Japan), a 1969 Japanese samurai drama film by Hiroshi Inagaki starring Toshirō Mifune
- Fūrin Kazan (TV series), a 2007 Japanese Taiga television drama series that aired on NHK
- Furinkazan (professional wrestling), a professional wrestling tag tournament held by Pro Wrestling Zero1

== See also ==
- 風林火山
