= Hong Kong Film Award for Best Supporting Actress =

Annual Chinese film award

- Awarded for: Performance by an actress in a supporting role
- Country: Hong Kong
- Presented by: Hong Kong Film Awards
- First award: 1985
- Currently held by: Michelle Wai (2026)

The Hong Kong Film Award for Best Supporting Actress is an annual Hong Kong industry award presented to an actress for the best performance by an actress in a supporting role.

== History ==
The award was established at the 4th Hong Kong Film Awards (1985) and the first winner was Anita Mui for her role in the film Behind the Yellow Line. There are 5, sometimes 6, nominations for the category of Best Supporting Actress from which one actress is chosen the winner of the Hong Kong Film Award for Best Supporting Actress. The most recent recipient of the award was Michelle Wai, who was honoured at the 44th Hong Kong Film Awards (2026), for her performance in Ciao UFO.

The actress with most awards in this category is Elaine Jin with 4 awards. There are six actresses who have been awarded in both the categories for leading and supporting roles, Anita Mui, Cecilia Yip, Zhou Xun, Deanie Ip, Kara Wai and Teresa Mo.

== Winners and nominees ==
Year	Actor	Film	Ref.
1985 (4th)	Anita Mui	Behind the Yellow Line	
1985 (4th)	Loletta Lee	Shanghai Blues	
1985 (4th)	Chiao Chiao	Love in a Fallen City	
1985 (4th)	Monica Lam	An Amorous Woman of Tang Dynasty	
1985 (4th)	Angela Yu Chien	Hong Kong 1941	
1986 (5th)	Deanie Ip	My Name Ain't Suzie	
1986 (5th)	Elaine Jin	Women	
1986 (5th)	Chan Yuen-Lai	Hong Kong Graffiti	
1986 (5th)	Pauline Wong	Night Caller	
1987 (6th)	Elaine Jin	Love Unto Waste	
1987 (6th)	Margaret Lee	The Last Emperor	
1987 (6th)	Lee Din-Hing	The Last Emperor	
1987 (6th)	Cher Yeung	Dream Lovers	
1987 (6th)	Tsai Chin	Love Unto Waste	
1988 (7th)	Elaine Jin	People's Hero	
1988 (7th)	Joyce Godenzi	Eastern Condors	
1988 (7th)	Carrie Ng	City on Fire	
1988 (7th)	Deanie Ip	Spiritual Love	
1989 (8th)	Sara Lee	School on Fire	
1989 (8th)	Elaine Jin	Set Me Free	
1989 (8th)	Prudence Liew	Law or Justice	
1989 (8th)	Cora Miao	The Other Half and the Other Half	
1990 (9th)	Cecilia Yip	Beyond the Sunset	
1990 (9th)	Josephine Koo	A Fishy Story	
1990 (9th)	Meg Lam	The First Time is the Last Time	
1990 (9th)	Seung Tin-Ngoh	Sentenced to Hang	
1990 (9th)	Pauline Wong	Web of Deception	
1991 (10th)	Rain Lau	Queen of Temple Street	
1991 (10th)	Carol Cheng	Queen's Bench III	
1991 (10th)	Maggie Cheung	Red Dust	
1991 (10th)	Hayley Man	Farewell China	
1991 (10th)	Rebecca Pan	Days of Being Wild	
1992 (11th)	Deanie Ip	Dances with Dragon	
1992 (11th)	Rosamund Kwan	This Thing Called Love	
1992 (11th)	Carrie Ng	Au Revoir Mon Amour	
1992 (11th)	Chingmy Yau	Lee Rock	
1992 (11th)	Cecilia Yip	To Be Number One	
1993 (12th)	Fung Bo Bo	92 Legendary La Rose Noire	
1993 (12th)	Teresa Mo	92 Legendary La Rose Noire	
1993 (12th)	Teresa Mo	Now You See Love, Now You Don't	
1993 (12th)	Wong Wan-Si	92 Legendary La Rose Noire	
1993 (12th)	Deanie Ip	Fight Back to School II	
1994 (13th)	Fung Bo Bo	C'est la vie, mon chéri	
1994 (13th)	Law Lan	Thou Shalt Not Swear	
1994 (13th)	Carrie Ng	C'est la vie, mon chéri	
1994 (13th)	Deanie Ip	Murder	
1994 (13th)	Veronica Yip	Love Among the Triad	
1995 (14th)	Law Koon-Lan	I Have a Date with Spring	
1995 (14th)	Valerie Chow	Chungking Express	
1995 (14th)	Fung Wai-Hung	I Have a Date with Spring	
1995 (14th)	Carrie Ng	The Lovers	
1995 (14th)	Sandra Ng	The Returning	
1996 (15th)	Karen Mok	Fallen Angels	
1996 (15th)	Law Koon-Lan	Summer Snow	
1996 (15th)	Law Koon-Lan	The Umbrella Story	
1996 (15th)	Teresa Ha	Full Throttle	
1996 (15th)	Francoise Yip	Rumble in the Bronx	
1997 (16th)	Shu Qi	Viva Erotica	
1997 (16th)	Law Koon-Lan	Bodyguards of Last Governor	
1997 (16th)	Law Koon-Lan	July 13th	
1997 (16th)	Theresa Lee	Big Bullet	
1997 (16th)	Theresa Lee	Who's the Woman, Who's the Man?	
1997 (16th)	Anita Yuen	Hu-Du-Men	
1998 (17th)	Anita Mui	Eighteen Springs	
1998 (17th)	Elaine Jin	The Soong Sisters	
1998 (17th)	Michelle Yeoh	The Soong Sisters	
1998 (17th)	Theresa Lee	Downtown Torpedoes	
1998 (17th)	Theresa Lee	Intimates	
1999 (18th)	Shu Qi	Portland Street Blues	
1999 (18th)	Stephanie Che	Beast Cops	
1999 (18th)	Amanda Lee Wai Man	9413	
1999 (18th)	Shu Qi	The Storm Riders	
1999 (18th)	Kristy Yang	Portland Street Blues	
2000 (19th)	Carrie Ng	The Kid	
2000 (19th)	Nina Paw	Ordinary Heroes	
2000 (19th)	Josie Ho	Purple Storm	
2000 (19th)	Elaine Jin	Metade Fumaca	
2000 (19th)	Elaine Jin	Tempting Heart	
2001 (20th)	Cheng Pei-pei	Crouching Tiger, Hidden Dragon	
2001 (20th)	Gigi Leung	A War Named Desire	
2001 (20th)	Candy Lo	Time and Tide	
2001 (20th)	Teresa Mo	And I Hate You So	
2001 (20th)	Rebecca Pan	In the Mood for Love	
2002 (21st)	Karena Lam	July Rhapsody	
2002 (21st)	Josie Ho	Forever and Ever	
2002 (21st)	Kara Hui	Visible Secret	
2002 (21st)	So Kung	Lan Yu	
2002 (21st)	Cecilia Yip	The Avenging Fist	
2003 (22nd)	Rene Liu	Double Vision	
2003 (22nd)	Kristal Tin	Golden Chicken	
2003 (22nd)	Cecilia Yip	May and August	
2003 (22nd)	Eugenia Yuan	Three: Going Home	
2003 (22nd)	Zhang Ziyi	Hero	
2004 (23rd)	Josie Ho	Naked Ambition	
2004 (23rd)	Nina Paw	Lost in Time	
2004 (23rd)	Josie Ho	The Twins Effect	
2004 (23rd)	Candy Lo	Truth or Dare: 6th Floor Rear Flat	
2004 (23rd)	Maggie Shiu	PTU	
2005 (24th)	Bai Ling	Dumplings: Three...Extremes	
2005 (24th)	Jenny Hu	Yesterday Once More	
2005 (24th)	Candy Lo	Six Strong Guys	
2005 (24th)	Maggie Shiu	Breaking News	
2005 (24th)	Kate Yeung	20 30 40	
2006 (25th)	Teresa Mo	2 Young	
2006 (25th)	Karena Lam	Ah Sou	
2006 (25th)	Maggie Shiu	Election	
2006 (25th)	Su Yan	Everlasting Regret	
2006 (25th)	Zhang Jingchu	Seven Swords	
2007 (26th)	Zhou Xun	The Banquet	
2007 (26th)	Kelly Lin	After This Our Exile	
2007 (26th)	Isabella Leong	Diary	
2007 (26th)	Kristal Tin	My Mother is a Belly Dancer	
2007 (26th)	Candice Yu	My Name Is Fame	
2008 (27th)	Susan Shaw	The Pye-Dog	
2008 (27th)	Anita Yuen	Protégé	
2008 (27th)	Karen Mok	Mr. Cinema	
2008 (27th)	Maggie Shiu	Eye in the Sky	
2008 (27th)	Zhao Wei	The Postmodern Life of My Aunt	
2009 (28th)	Chan Lai-Wun	The Way We Are	
2009 (28th)	Nora Miao	Run Papa Run	
2009 (28th)	Sun Li	Painted Skin	
2009 (28th)	Race Wong	True Women for Sale	
2009 (28th)	Zhao Wei	Red Cliff	
2010 (29th)	Michelle Ye	Accident	
2010 (29th)	Denise Ho	Look for a Star	
2010 (29th)	Fan Bingbing	Bodyguards And Assassins	
2010 (29th)	Li Yuchun	Bodyguards And Assassins	
2010 (29th)	Zhao Wei	Red Cliff II	
2011 (30th)	Susan Shaw	Gallants	
2011 (30th)	Candice Yu	Once A Gangster	
2011 (30th)	Mimi Chu	Crossing Hennessy	
2011 (30th)	Nina Paw	Crossing Hennessy	
2011 (30th)	Zhang Jingchu	City Under Siege	
2012 (31st)	Soh Hang-suen	Life Without Principle	
2012 (31st)	Kara Wai	Dragon	
2012 (31st)	Qin Hailu	A Simple Life	
2012 (31st)	Gwei Lun-Mei	Flying Swords of Dragon Gate	
2012 (31st)	Carina Lau	Let the Bullets Fly	
2013 (32nd)	Dada Chan	Vulgaria	
2013 (32nd)	Susan Shaw	Vulgaria	
2013 (32nd)	Jiang Yiyan	The Bullet Vanishes	
2013 (32nd)	Elaine Jin	The Viral Factor	
2013 (32nd)	Mavis Fan	The Silent War	
2014 (33rd)	Kara Wai	Rigor Mortis	
2014 (33rd)	Du Juan	American Dreams in China	
2014 (33rd)	Carina Lau	Young Detective Dee: Rise of the Sea Dragon	
2014 (33rd)	Law Lan	The White Storm	
2014 (33rd)	Crystal Lee	Unbeatable	
2015 (34th)	Ivana Wong	Golden Chickensss	
2015 (34th)	Kara Wai	The Midnight After	
2015 (34th)	Hao Lei	The Golden Era	
2015 (34th)	Fiona Sit	Girls	
2015 (34th)	Nina Paw	Insanity	
2016 (35th)	Elaine Jin	Port of Call	
2016 (35th)	Qin Hailu	A Tale of Three Cities	
2016 (35th)	Anna Ng	Little Big Master	
2016 (35th)	Janice Man	Helios	
2016 (35th)	Angelica Lee	Murmur of the Hearts	
2017 (36th)	Elaine Jin	Mad World	
2017 (36th)	Charmaine Fong	Mad World	
2017 (36th)	Zhang Yuqi	Mermaid	
2017 (36th)	Fish Liew	Sisterhood	
2017 (36th)	Janice Man	Cold War 2	
2018 (37th)	Deanie Ip	Our Time Will Come	
2018 (37th)	Joyce Cheng	29+1	
2018 (37th)	Estelle Wu	Love Education	
2018 (37th)	Susan Shaw	Vampire Cleanup Department	
2018 (37th)	Pui-Yee Bo	Somewhere Beyond The Mist	
2019 (38th)	Kara Wai	Tracey	
2019 (38th)	Huang Lu	G Affairs	
2019 (38th)	Jiang Luxia	Operation Red Sea	
2019 (38th)	Jennifer Yu	Men On The Dragon	
2019 (38th)	Catherine Chau	Project Gutenberg	
2020 (39th)	Patra Au	Suk Suk	
2020 (39th)	Megan Lai	Fagara	
2020 (39th)	Nina Paw	My Prince Edward	
2020 (39th)	Cya Liu	I'm Livin' It	
2020 (39th)	Charlene Choi	Fatal Visit	
2022 (40th)	Fish Liew	Anita	
2022 (40th)	Nina Paw	Caught in Time	
2022 (40th)	Chung Suet Ying	Time	
2022 (40th)	Fish Liew	Limbo	
2022 (40th)	Bai Lang	Leap	
2022 (40th)	Loletta Lee	Drifting	
2023 (41st)	Ivana Wong	Table for Six	
2023 (41st)	Harriet Yeung	The Sparring Partner	
2023 (41st)	Patra Au	The Narrow Road	
2023 (41st)	Lin Min Chen	Table for Six	
2023 (41st)	Jennifer Yu	Far Far Away	
2024 (42nd)	Rachel Leung	In Broad Daylight	
2024 (42nd)	Elaine Jin	Ready O/R Rot	
2024 (42nd)	Rosa Maria Velasco	Time Still Turns the Pages	
2024 (42nd)	Renci Yeung	A Guilty Conscience	
2024 (42nd)	Fish Liew	A Guilty Conscience	
2025 (43rd)	Jo Koo	Papa	
2025 (43rd)	Stephy Tang	Love Lies	
2025 (43rd)	Rachel Leung	The Last Dance	
2025 (43rd)	Rosa Maria Velasco	The Last Dance	
2025 (43rd)	Maggie Li Lin Lin	All Shall Be Well	
2026 (44th)	Michelle Wai	Ciao UFO	
2026 (44th)	Elizabeth Tang	Girlfriends	
2026 (44th)	Kara Wai	The Dumpling Queen	
2026 (44th)	Nina Paw	Sons of the Neon Night	
2026 (44th)	Joyce Tang	Back to the Past	

== Multiple wins and nominations ==
=== Multiple wins ===
Wins	Actress
4
4	Elaine Jin
3
3	Deanie Ip
2
2	Anita Mui
2	Fung Bo Bo
2	Shu Qi
2	Susan Shaw
2	Kara Wai
2	Ivana Wong

=== Multiple nominations ===
Nominations	Actress
11	Elaine Jin
7	Nina Paw
6	Deanie Ip
5	Carrie Ng
5	Law Koon-Lan
5	Kara Wai
4	Cecilia Yip
4	Teresa Mo
4	Theresa Lee
4	Josie Ho
4	Maggie Shiu
4	Susan Shaw
4	Fish Liew
3	Shu Qi
3	Candy Lo
3	Zhao Wei

== See also ==
- Hong Kong Film Award
- Hong Kong Film Award for Best Actor
- Hong Kong Film Award for Best Actress
- Hong Kong Film Award for Best Supporting Actor
- Hong Kong Film Award for Best Action Choreography
- Hong Kong Film Award for Best Cinematography
- Hong Kong Film Award for Best Director
- Hong Kong Film Award for Best Film
- Hong Kong Film Award for Best New Performer
