= 9m88 =

Taiwanese-raised New York-based musician (born 1990)

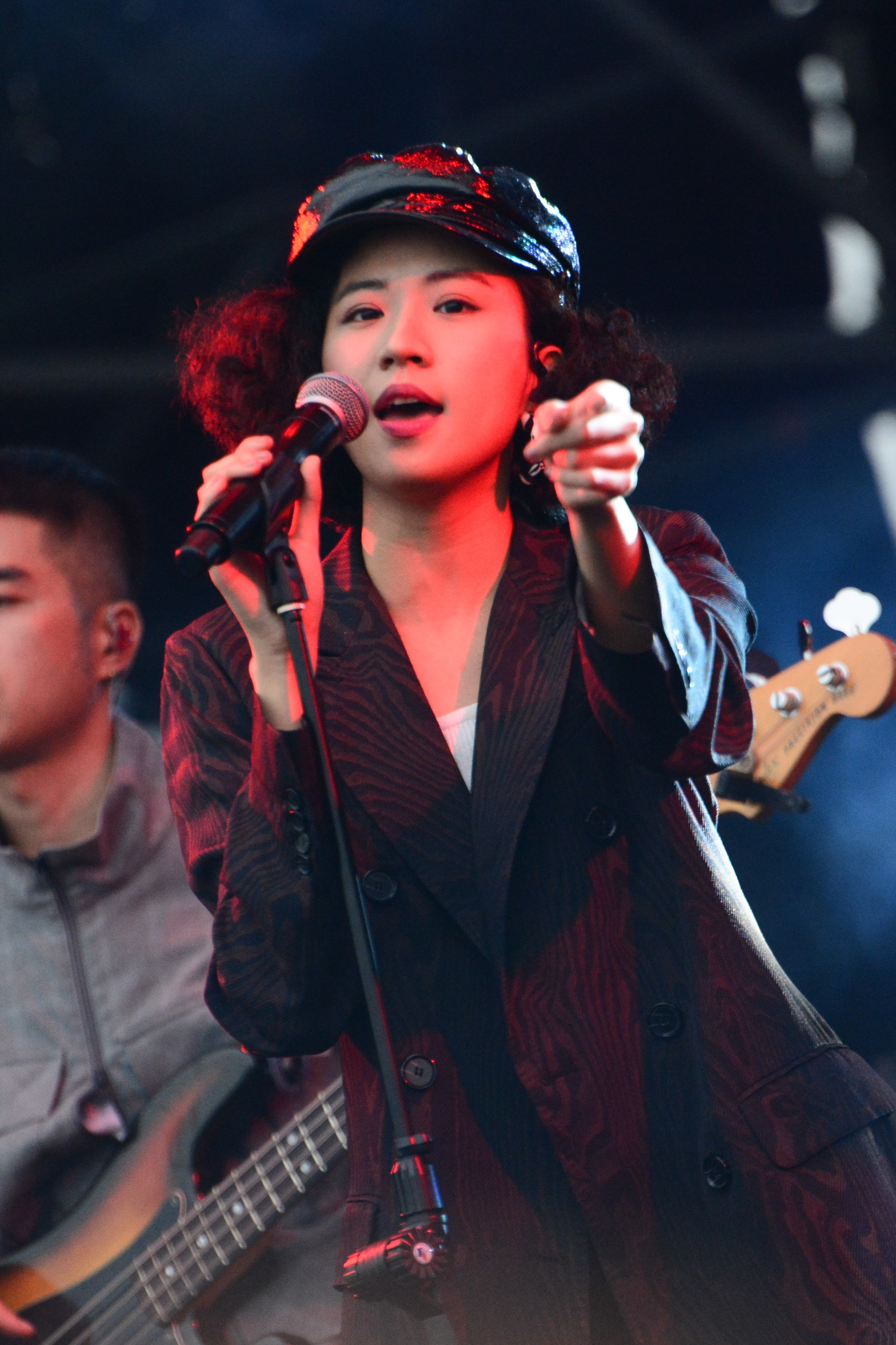
- 9m88 at 2019 Megaport Music Festival

Background information
- Born: November 20, 1990 (age 35); Taipei, Taiwan
- Genres: Jazz; R&B; hip hop; pop
- Occupations: Singer; songwriter; actress
- Years active: 2017-present
- Label: Jazz Baby Ltd.
- Website: 9m88.co

Joanne Tang Yu-chi (Chinese: 湯毓綺; pinyin: Tāng Yùqǐ; born November 20, 1990), better known by her stage name 9m88, is a Taiwanese singer, songwriter, and actress.

== Biography ==
9m88 was born in 1990. She majored in fashion design at Shih Chien University. At age 25, she went to The New School for Jazz and Contemporary Music. 9m88 released her debut album “Beyond Mediocrity” independently in August 2019. In October 2021, 9m88 performed with the Cloud Gate Dance Theater.

== Music style ==
After arriving in New York as a Jazz voice major, she has broadened her interest in various genres of music, including Jazz, R&B, Pop, and Free Improvisation. Baba is also known for infusing her music with vivid and retro visuals. Her lyrics usually deal with personal bitter-sweet stories on a daily basis. The release of her 7-inch vinyl “Nine Head Hinano”, including a cover of City Pop classic “Plastic Love”, has helped her increase followers over the world.

== Activism ==
9m88 recorded a track for the album T-POP: No Fear In Love, a compilation album celebrating the one-year anniversary of the legalization of same-sex marriage in Taiwan, with others including Enno Cheng.

== Discography ==
=== Studio albums ===
Sent (2023)

Track No.	Track name	Length
1	Hair	3:02
2	Look at My Way	3:49
3	Tsiok Kú Bô Kìnn	3:04
4	Sent	4:01
5	Fauvism	4:44
6	What If? (feat. Takuya Kuroda)	4:05
7	Frenemy	3:45
8	Farewell Summer	4:32

9m88 Radio (2022)

Track No.	Track name	Length
1	Whatchu Gonna…?	3:48
2	Tell Me	4:06
3	Sleepwalking (feat. SUMIN)	3:30
4	Love Is So Cruel	2:40
5	A Merry Feeling	3:08
6	:-D	0:51
7	Friend Zone (feat. Oddisee)	3:25
8	:’-(	0:52
9	Dark Night / Sunlight	3:14
10	Prelude to A Star	0:25
11	Star	4:2

Beyond Mediocrity (2019)
Track No.	Track name	Length
1	Intro - She Is	0:36
2	Beyond Mediocrity (平庸之上)	3:47
3	Airplane Mode (feat. Leo Wang) (最高品質靜悄悄)	3:23
4	Aim High	3:44
5	Waste of Time (浪費時間)	4:14
6	Leftlovers (廚餘戀人)	3:49
7	Love Rain (愛情雨)	3:08
8	Nine Head Hinano (九頭身日奈)	3:54
9	Inner	1:44
10	If I Could (如果可以)	4:24

=== Singles/Collaborative Singles ===
- Weekends With You - Leo Wang (ft. 9m88) (2016)
- Air Doll (2017)
- Walking Towards Me (feat. 馬念先) (2019)
- B.O. - ØZI (ft. 9m88) (2018)
- Everybody Woohoo - Wu Tsing-fong (ft. 9m88) (2018)
- 為i篩檢 (2019)
- Aim High (2019)
- Hello Bye Bye (2020)
- Strange Weather - 9m88 & YELLOW (2020)
- Stay a While - TOSHIKI HAYASHI(%C) (ft. 9m88) (2020)
- Shadow - Elephant Gym (feat. 9m88) (2022)
- Kitchen - Penthouse (feat. 9m88) (2024)

=== Film ===
- I Missed You (2021)
- Tales of Taipei (2024)
- A Foggy Tale (2025)
- Girl (2025)
- Double Happiness (2025)

=== Television ===
- Light the Night (2021)

== Awards ==
2026 28th TAIPEI FILM FESTIVAL-‘Best Original Film Song <A Foggy Midnight>’

2020 11th Golden Indie Music Awards – Best New Artist

2018 ELLE Taiwan Elle Style Awards - ‘The Most Stylish Future Star’

== Tour ==
29 February 2020 - New Taipei City
8 April 2020 - Santa Cruz, California
