= Back to the Past (film) =

2025 Hong Kong film by Ng Yuen-fai and Jack Lai

- Theatrical release poster
- Traditional Chinese: 尋秦記
- Simplified Chinese: 寻秦记
- Hanyu Pinyin: Xún Qín Jì
- Jyutping: Cam4 Ceon4 Gei3
- Directed by: Ng Yuen-fai; Jack Lai
- Screenplay by: Lily He
- Based on: The Chronicles of Searching Qin by Wong Yik
- Produced by: Louis Koo; Tang Wai-but
- Starring: Louis Koo; Raymond Lam; Jessica Hsuan; Sonija Kwok; Joyce Tang; Bai Baihe; Kevin Chu; Power Chan; Michael Miu
- Cinematography: Kenny Tse
- Edited by: Wong Hoi; Kenny Lok
- Music by: Chan Kwong-wing; Kay Chan; Christopher Lai
- Production companies: One Cool Film Production; Huace Pictures; China Star Movie
- Distributed by: One Cool Pictures
- Release date: 31 December 2025 (Hong Kong)
- Running time: 107 minutes
- Country: Hong Kong
- Languages: Cantonese; Mandarin; English
- Budget: US$45 million
- Box office: US$51 million

Back to the Past (Chinese: 尋秦記) is a 2025 Hong Kong historical science fiction action film directed by Ng Yuen-fai and Jack Lai, with action directed by Sammo Hung. The film is a legacy sequel of the 2001 television series A Step into the Past, which was a spiritual sequel of the Wong Yik's novel, The Chronicles of Searching Qin. Louis Koo, Raymond Lam, Jessica Hsuan, Sonija Kwok, Joyce Tang, Power Chan, Jimmy Au, Wong Man-piu, Liu Kai-chi, John Tang, and Michelle Saram reprising their roles from the series, alongside newcomers from the film include Louis Cheung, Wu Yue, Timmy Hung, Chris Collins, Kevin Chu, Bai Baihe, and Michael Miu.

Produced by Koo's One Cool Film Production, filming for Back to the Past began in April 2019 in Guizhou and wrapped up on 7 July 2019. It was theatrically released on 31 December 2025 in Hong Kong, and received mixed reviews from critics.

== Plot ==
In 1999, Hong Kong police officer Hong Siu-lung travels to the Warring States period by time machine, but fails to return to the present. In order to avoid corporate liability, executive Li Siu-chiu shifts responsibility for the failed mission onto the project's true inventor, Ken. The incident leaves unresolved tensions surrounding the ethics of time travel and accountability.

After serving over twenty years of wrongful imprisonment, Ken assembles his brother-in-law Phil, his daughter Galie, and several mercenaries to reclaim his lost future. In 2025, they force Dr. Mo Yau to reactivate the time machine. Traveling back two thousand years, Ken intends to overthrow the King of Qin, and establish himself as the first emperor in Chinese history, thereby rewriting the course of history.

In the past, Ching has just conquered Qi, thus unified all the six states. While returning in triumph to Hangu Pass, he is ambushed by Ken's group, whose modern weaponry overwhelms Qin forces. Ching narrowly escapes and seeks assistance from Siu-lung, who has long withdrawn from political life and lives in seclusion with his family in a mountain refuge. Recognizing that further temporal interference threatens both history and his family's safety, Siu-lung prepares to evacuate, but Ken's forces pursue them, leading to a violent confrontation.

During the conflict, Siu-lung and his allies manage to kill several mercenaries, rescue Ching and capture Galie, though Siu-lung's wife Wu Ting-fong is taken hostage. A negotiated exchange follows, complicated by the use of advanced technological disguises that enable both sides to impersonate Ching at different stages. Ken ultimately infiltrates the stronghold, wounds Ching and Sin-yau, and proceeds to Hangu Pass while posing as the King of Qin. However, inconsistencies arouse suspicion among Qin officials, including Li Si, who learns that the true king remains alive.

At Hangu Pass, the appearance of both the real and the impostor Ying Ching throws Qin troops into confusion. Galie attempts to buy time for Ken's escape by maintaining the deception while a signal receiver charges to facilitate their return to the modern era. Infuriated by the affront to his authority, Ching executes Galie and personally destroy the device, eliminating the possibility of return. In despair, Ken reveals that the emperor's reign will be short-lived for ten years more and that the Qin dynasty will ultimately fall to Hong Yu, which was eventually for Bowie, Siu-lung's son. Having lost his daughter and his ambitions, Ken kills himself.

In the aftermath, Ching briefly turns his suspicion toward Siu-lung upon learning of Hong Yu's future significance. However, after a final exchange reflecting on their shared past as mentor and student, the emperor once again spares Siu-lung and allows him to depart. To preserve imperial authority, Ching orders the official record altered, attributing the events to a royal expedition in search of elixir of immortality. An alternate ending as the post-credits scene depicts the successful activation of the signal receiver, transporting key Qin inhabitants to modern Hong Kong before they resolve to return to the past to correct the historical disruptions caused by time travel.

== Cast ==
- Louis Koo as Hong Siu-lung (項少龍)
- Raymond Lam as Chiu Poon (趙盤) / Ying Ching (嬴政)
- Jessica Hsuan as Wu Ting-fong (烏廷芳)
- Sonija Kwok as Kam Ching (琴清)
- Joyce Tang as Sin-yau (善柔)
- Bai Baihe as Galie (Cantonese voiced by Jennifer Yu)
- Michael Miu as Ken
- Kevin Chu as Bowie Hung (項寶兒) / Hong Yu (項羽)
- Jimmy Au as Steward To Fong (陶方)
- Wong Man-piu as Tang Yik (滕翼)
- Louis Cheung as Stone (石頭)
- Wu Yue as Max (Cantonese voiced by Ip Chun-sing)
- Timmy Hung as Phil
- Chris Collins as Tim
- Liu Yang as George
- Edward Chui as Dan
- Power Chan as Li Si (李斯)
- Michelle Saram as Maggie
- Fish Liew as Man Song (聞桑)
- Liu Kai-chi as Professor Wu Yau (烏有博士)
- John Tang as Lee Siu-chiu (李小超)

== Production ==
=== Development ===
For many years, Louis Koo has expressed interest in adapting A Step into the Past to the big screen. Koo's film production company, One Cool Film Production, was able to acquire the rights to the series in 2017.

In March 2018, it was announced that aside from Koo, Jessica Hsuan and Raymond Lam will also be reprising their roles from the series and production was to begin at the end of 2018 with budget of US$45 million. Jack Lai will be set to direct and make his directoral debut.

In February 2019, it was announced that Sammo Hung will serve as the film's action director.

On 18 March 2019, the film was promoted at the 2019 Hong Kong FILMART. Aside from Koo, Hsuan and Lam, series cast members Joyce Tang and Michelle Saram were also present at the event, confirming their participation in the film. Visual effects artists Ng Yuen-fai will also co-direct the film with Lai.

=== Filming ===
Principal photography for Back to the Past began in April 2019 in Guizhou. On 12 April 2019, photos from the set were revealed, showing Koo's costume. Production for the film officially wrapped on 7 July 2019.

== Release ==
The film experienced a series of delays due to the COVID-19 pandemic, going without a release date for years. A trailer was released in March 2021, but the film did not receive a release date until November 2025.

It was ultimately released in Hong Kong on 31 December 2025. It was distributed by Trinity CineAsia in the UK and Ireland on 2 January 2026, and by Well Go USA in North America on 30 January 2026.

== Reception ==
=== Box office ===
Back to the Past grossed HK$10.9 million (US$1.4 million) on its first day, setting a record for the highest opening-day performance of a Chinese-language film in Hong Kong. It was the second-biggest opening overall in Hong Kong, behind Avengers: Endgame in 2019, which earned HK$20.88 million.

In China, the film made approximately RMB 78.6 million (US$24 million) during its opening weekend.

=== Critical response ===
On the review aggregator website Rotten Tomatoes, 40% of 10 critics' reviews are positive. Edmund Lee of the South China Morning Post awarded the film 3 out of 5 stars, describing it as "a subpar historical sci-fi fantasy that is saved – and arguably even transcended – by the potent wave of nostalgia it inspires in its target audience." Lee noted that "both Koo and Lam have matured into significantly better actors in the intervening years", though it was hampered by what he characterized as Lily He's "slack screenplay" and logical gaps in the plot.

Simon Abrams of RogerEbert.com awarded the film 2 out of 4 stars, criticizing the film's "bland exposition" and "functional, forgettable dialogue". Abrams wrote that the villain Ken was "a fairly generic villain", and felt the film ultimately did not offer anything new compared to the original show. Phil Hoad of The Guardian gave the film 2 out of 5 stars, finding the "rote gun-fu" fight choreography surprising given the involvement of Sammo Hung, and criticized the story's "soapy convolutions" and "increasingly sententious tone."

=== Awards and nominations ===
Year	Awards	Category	Recipient(s)	Result(s)
2026	44th Hong Kong Film Awards	Best Film	—N/a	Nominated
2026	44th Hong Kong Film Awards	Best Actor	Louis Koo	Nominated
2026	44th Hong Kong Film Awards	Best Supporting Actress	Joyce Tang	Nominated
2026	44th Hong Kong Film Awards	Best Cinematography	Kenny Tse	Nominated
2026	44th Hong Kong Film Awards	Best Film Editing	Wong Hoi, Kenny Lok	Nominated
2026	44th Hong Kong Film Awards	Best Art Direction	Lam Wai-kin	Nominated
2026	44th Hong Kong Film Awards	Best Costume Makeup Design	Cheung Siu-hong	Nominated
2026	44th Hong Kong Film Awards	Best Action Choreography	Sammo Hung	Nominated
2026	44th Hong Kong Film Awards	Best Sound Design	Terry Shek	Nominated
2026	44th Hong Kong Film Awards	Best Visual Effects	Dave Kwok, Jules Lin, Yee Kwok-leung, Kwok Tai	Nominated
2026	44th Hong Kong Film Awards	Best Original Film Score	Chan Kwong-wing, Kay Chan, Christopher Lai	Nominated

== See also ==
- Sammo Hung filmography
- List of films based on television programs
