= The Dumpling Queen =

2025 Chinese-Hong Kong film by Andrew Lau

- Theatrical release poster
- Traditional Chinese: 水餃皇后
- Simplified Chinese: 水饺皇后
- Hanyu Pinyin: Shuǐjiǎo huánghòu
- Jyutping: Seoi^{2} Gaau^{2} Wong^{4} Hau^{6}
- Directed by: Andrew Lau
- Written by: Han Jianü; Zhang Mengchu; Theresa Tang
- Produced by: Mandy Law; Andrew Lau
- Starring: Ma Li; Kara Wai; Zhu Yawen
- Cinematography: Andrew Lau; Wang Hao
- Edited by: Lin Zhuangyu; Chen Yuxuan; Li Jianxiang
- Music by: Chan Kwong-wing; Christopher Lai
- Production companies: CMC Pictures; Alibaba Pictures
- Distributed by: CMC Pictures
- Release date: 30 April 2025
- Running time: 119 minutes
- Countries: China; Hong Kong
- Languages: Mandarin; Cantonese
- Budget: ¥80 million
- Box office: US$52.8 million

The Dumpling Queen (simplified Chinese: 水饺皇后; traditional Chinese: 水餃皇后) is a 2025 biographical drama film co-produced and directed by Andrew Lau. Starring Ma Li as the titular character, the film is adapted from the entrepreneurial journey of Chong Kin-wo, the founder of the Hong Kong frozen food brand Wanchai Ferry. It tells the story of Chong Kin-wo and her struggle from being a single mother who fled from mainland China to Hong Kong to becoming a well-known entrepreneur.

A Chinese-Hong Kong co-production, the film was released in China on April 30, 2025.

== Synopsis ==
In the 1980s, at the beginning of China's Reform and opening-up when the economy was rapidly taking off, many entrepreneurs rode the rising wave of commerce. During this time, Chong Kin-wo, who had come from Shandong, was unexpectedly forced to remain in Hong Kong. To make a living, she began selling her family's traditional northern-style dumplings, gradually building what would become a globally popular dumpling brand.

Together with her two daughters, Madame Chong struggled to adapt to life in a foreign country. With limited financial resources, she sets out to build a new life through her own efforts. Despite facing exploitation by employers, illness, and numerous personal hardships, she perseveres in her efforts to achieve stability and independence. Along the way, she receives support from several neighbors, including Ms. Hung, Mr. Hua, and Uncle Tong sui.

== Cast ==
- Ma Li as Chong Kin-wo
- Kara Wai as Ms. Hung
- Zhu Yawen as Mr. Hua
- Wong Cho-lam as Mr. Gam
- Fiona Sit as Rose
- Michael Tse as Stanry
- Pan Binlong as Ice-cream Bing
- Ben Yuen as Tong sui bo
- Elena Kong as Sister Zan
- Tai Bo as Happy Uncle
- Cheung Tat-ming as Mr. Spicy Tart
- Wang Jiayi as adult Peng Peng
- Ashley Lam as adult Bei Bei

== Production ==
Filming officially started on October 5, 2023, at the Xiqiao National Arts Film Studio in Foshan, Guangdong. On November 22, 2023, it was announced that filming had wrapped up.

== Release ==
The film was showcased in the Hong Kong Panorama section of the 25th New York Asian Film Festival on 11 July 2026 and had its New York Premiere.

== Accolades ==
| Year | Award | Category | Recipient(s) | Results | Ref. |
|---|---|---|---|---|---|
| 2025 | 38th Golden Rooster Awards | Best Supporting Actor | Ben Yuen | Won | |
| 2025 | 38th Golden Rooster Awards | Best Supporting Actress | Kara Wai | Nominated | |
| 2025 | 38th Golden Rooster Awards | Best Music | Chan Kwong-wing, Christopher Lai | Nominated | |
| 2026 | 44th Hong Kong Film Awards | Best Actress | Ma Li | Nominated | |
| 2026 | 44th Hong Kong Film Awards | Best Supporting Actor | Ben Yuen | Nominated | |
| 2026 | 44th Hong Kong Film Awards | Best Supporting Actress | Kara Wai | Nominated | |
