= Another World (2025 film) =

2025 Hong Kong film by Tommy Ng

- Theatrical release poster
- Chinese: 世外
- Directed by: Tommy Kai Chung Ng
- Screenplay by: Polly Yeung
- Based on: Thousand Year Ghost by Naka Saijō....
- Produced by: Polly Yeung; Gin Kai Chan
- Starring: Short film: Kay Tse; Rosa Maria Velasco; Film: Chung Suet Ying; Christy Choi Hiu Tung; Louis Cheung; Kay Tse; Will Or; Goofy Yeung Nga Man
- Music by: Adlian Chau; CMgroovy; Vicky Fung Wing Ki
- Production companies: Point Five Productions; SILVER MEDIA GROUP; Film Development Council
- Distributed by: Edko Films
- Release dates: June 16, 2025 (Annecy); October 29, 2025 (Hong Kong)
- Running time: 111 minutes
- Country: Hong Kong
- Language: Cantonese
- Budget: HKD 30-50 million
- Box office: HKD 15 million

Another World (Chinese: 世外) is a 2025 Hong Kong fantasy animated film, adapted from Naka Saijō's 2012 novel Thousand Year Ghost. The film is co-produced by Point Five Productions and SILVER MEDIA GROUP, directed by Tommy Ng, and written and produced by Polly Yeung, with Gin Kai Chan as co-producer. Initially released as a 14-minute short film in 2019 and winning multiple international awards, it was later remade into a full-length feature film released in 2025. This film marks Hong Kong's second full-length animation after My Life as McDull to be selected for the Annecy International Animation Film Festival, and the first Hong Kong animation to be featured in the festival's "Midnight Special" section. In 2025, the film won the Golden Horse Award for Best Animated Feature, with nominations for Best Adapted Screenplay and Best Original Score. As of December 25, 2025, the film had grossed over HK$15 million, making it the highest-grossing Hong Kong animated film, and also the second highest-grossing homemade movie of 2025 in Hong Kong.

== Plot ==
An afterlife realm, called Another World, is populated by several groups of beings, including short, mask-adorned creatures known as "soulkeepers". Once dead humans in this afterlife are willing to let their past life go, the soulkeepers take them to a waterfall where they leave their memories behind and reincarnate. Their souls then turn into ropes, which float down the river. Ropes with knots signify that soul's unresolved resentments. If a soul gains too many resentments that are not resolved, a seed will grow inside of them called a Seed of Evil. If this seed sprouts, they will turn into a Wrath, an evil being of unimaginable power. Gudo, a soulkeeper, longs to know why these unresolved resentments create the Seeds. While pondering, he meets Yuri, who is looking for her brother Kenji. The two go off to find him and form a friendship. Gudo takes Yuri to see the Goddess, the ruler of Another World. When Yuri demands that the Goddess help her find Kenji, the Goddess gives Gudo the power to observe the past.

Elsewhere, in a kingdom called Flower City, a princess named Goran is being plagued by her emerging Seed of Evil. Goran's uncle reveals to her that her father, the King, had died in battle. Her Seed only sprouts more as she is secretly berated. At the King's funeral, a defecting general from Nyer, the enemy kingdom, and trusted aide of her father, is arrested. She later visits him in the dungeon, but lashes out in disbelief after she is told that the King committed suicide, while Nyer's troops are advancing on their kingdom.

Goran is visited by Gudo, who asks for some food. Goran reluctantly gives him some, and as a reward, Gudo uses his power to take her to the moments before her father's death. Once there, Goran sees the defected general leaving the King's tent, which she believes confirms the man's guilt, before her Seed begins to spike and she falls unconscious. Dark Sky, Gudo's bodyguard, demands Gudo steps aside, so he can kill Goran before her Seed turns her into a Wrath. Gudo protests this, stating that since Goran hasn't sprouted the horns of a Wrath yet, she can still be saved from turning into one. After Gudo tricks him into thinking he decapitates her, the three are summoned to Another World. Goran, back in Flower City, becomes more deranged.

A few decades into the future, Flower City has fallen due to a Wrath known as the "Ghost Princess" and has been renamed "Wheat Village". Keung, a wheat farmer, is considering a rebellion by calling upon the power of the Ghost Princess' Wrath in order to stop Nyer's forces from stealing half of their harvest, and slaughtering anyone who objects, despite the oncoming winter.

Later that night, Keung visits the Requiem Temple, where the supposed hand of the Wrath "Ghost Hand" lies, despite the protests of his family and fellow farmers. Upon meeting Gudo, Keung demands to be made a Wrath just like the Ghost Princess. Gudo reveals that the Ghost Princess was simply Goran: after slaughtering all of Flower City's prisoners and the people who belittled her, she realised the weight of her actions and begged Gudo to see her father one last time, realizing the General was telling the truth. Having been given closure, Gudo removes Goran's Seed of Evil and destroys it. However, Flower City had already fallen, and despite her attempts to find her uncle and save the city, Goran succumbs to a fatal amount of wasp stings and dies in the forest. Gudo tries to intervene, but is stopped by Dark Sky.

Seeing that Keung is still not convinced that becoming a Wrath is not a good idea, Gudo turns his attention to the nearby "Ghost Hand", and explains that "Ghost Hand" was once a man wanting to save his people, but ended up slaughtering them all when becoming a Wrath, including his own daughter. This nearly causes Keung to falter long enough for Gudo to pluck his Seed, but it closes again when Keung tells himself that he won't befall the same fate and would recognise his daughter. Eventually, Dark Sky jumps in to kill a hidden Wrath behind the duo, which is revealed to be his friend, Duan, who has lost his family. Seeing his friend's corpse, and feeling despair over his death, Keung renounces his pledge to become a Wrath, and Gudo plucks his Seed before collapsing. The other farmers eventually find Keung and start a revolution against Nyer and its Leader, but are killed upon falling into a trap. As Keung dies, he sees that one of his fellow farmers has turned into a Wrath.

As Gudo heals from his injuries from the fight, Dark Sky realises that Keung's failed rebellion has made so many ropes of resentment from their reincarnations that they have incapacitated the Goddess. She reveals that this can only be undone once Gudo's resentment is resolvesd. Gudo decides to tell Dark Sky about his pact.

Back in the past, after lamenting to Yuri that she had been dead the whole time, Gudo takes her back to the past so she can find out what happened to Kenji: After a landslide ravaged their village, the town had fallen into an immense famine. Kenji succumbs to the famine and his family reluctantly cook him into a stew so that they don't suffer the same fate.

Upon realizing she inadvertently ate her brother, she begins to turn into a Wrath, but Gudo is able to stop the process after one only horn sprouts. However, the Goddess appears and demands that Yuri be turned into dust so that her Wrath form cannot harm Another World. Gudo runs away with Yuri into the forest and uses the lake to summon Mother Earth, asking her about the creation of the Seeds of Evil. Mother Earth reveals Yuri will have to reincarnate for a millennia before she can reincarnate into a form that doesn't have a Seed from birth. Gudo then accepts the Goddess' offer to watch over Yuri's reincarnations for a thousand years, on the condition that, should he fail, will also turn into dust. The two head to the waterfall and Yuri allows herself to reincarnate, with Goran and Keung being Yuri's future reincarnations.

Yuri's last reincarnation, Ying, is a little orphaned girl and a child labourer in the Industrial Revolution. Gudo and Dark Sky arrive in a nearby factory to observe Ying, but Gudo starts to grow weak from his constant ventures into the human realm. Ying's Seed begins to sprout upon seeing another child labourer, Hardy, and her sister Nana protecting her from the attack of bullies. Nana falls from a second floor railing onto machinery below. Despite the workers' and Ying's best efforts, Nana falls to death into a flywheel's gears. Ying’s despair at witnessing this causes her to turn into a Wrath. After a fierce battle, Dark Sky manages to ground Ying, and Gudo takes the opportunity to use his past vision power on her, at the cost of fatally wounding himself.

Yuri, in form of Ying, laments to Gudo that she is not worth the thousand year's sacrifice that Gudo made, especially after eating Kenji and killing many people in her future incarnations. Gudo manages to comfort Yuri by proving she has saved Hardy, the reincarnation of Kenji. Filled with sorrow and relief, Yuri allows her final Seed to be plucked, finishing their pact. As Yuri happily looks at Hardy one last time before her death, Gudo begins to succumb to his wounds.

As Yuri appears in Another World, Dark Sky whisks her away to the Goddess, where a dying Gudo awaits. Gudo laments that he cannot return to the human realm, nor can he stay in Another World, due to his injuries. The Goddess reveals that he could also reincarnate himself now that his resentment has been resolved. Gudo elects to do so, despite losing his memories of Another World, as Yuri and Dark Sky look over him and he becomes a baby in Ying's city.

== Production history ==
=== Early development ===
Inspired by US psychiatrist Brian Weiss's book Many Lives, Many Masters: The True Story of a Prominent Psychiatrist, His Young Patient, and the Past-Life Therapy That Changed Both Their Lives, Screenwriter Polly Yeung started to explore themes of reincarnation and letting go of obsessions, which is prominent in the film. Director Tommy Kai Chung Ng drew inspiration from Tibetan "Skull Dance" rituals for the ghost character design, blending Buddhist "impermanence" philosophy to create an East Asian-influenced fantastical world. The film is inspired by Japanese author Naka Saijō's novel Thousand Year Ghost, which involves the main protagonist collecting "demon buds" and explores themes of purity, obsession, and sin. The concept revolves around spirits entering the "Beyond" after death, where they must relinquish worldly attachments to pass through a waterfall and reincarnate, or else risk transforming into monsters made from hatred In a 2026 interview, Yeung mentioned that she decided to work with Ng after watching his 2017 project Zombieology: Enjoy Yourself Tonight, during her search for an animator suitable for the project.

=== Short film ===
The 14-minute short film, completed in 2019, received the Hong Kong ifva Animation Award. The film employed a "digital picture book" style (hand-drawn watercolor backgrounds scanned, then animated with a 3D skeletal system), laying the visual foundation for the feature. Funded through the "Animation Support Scheme" under "Create Hong Kong," it won awards in 14 countries and regions, including the 21st Japan TBS Digicon6 ASIA Hong Kong Award, the Asia Grand Prize, Best Animation Short at the New York Horizons program, the Special Jury Award at the 8th China Independent Animation Film Forum, and the Montreal Animaze Festival Grand Prize. The short focuses on the protagonists' first encounter and farewell, setting the stage for the full-length story. In addition to voice work by Kay Tse and Rosa Maria Velasco, the ending theme song "Thinking" was performed by Linda Chau.

=== Feature film ===
The full-length version received HKD 5.6 million in funding from the Film Development Fund's "Film Production Financing Scheme" in 2020, while receiving international co-production funding from the Philippine Film Commission in 2022. During production, the producers actively reached out and secured support from investors in Saudi Arabia, marking the first animation project investment by Middle Eastern company Animekey, which believed the story about Eastern reincarnation would be popular in the Middle East. The film also received funding support from Hong Kong's Full Colour Limited, China's TMZ Media, and Japan's Digital Hollywood University. The production team took seven years to complete the film. Director Tommy Kai Chung Ng stated that the full film was a "rebuilding" process, expanding the story while maintaining the core ideas of Thousand Year Ghost and incorporating Hong Kong perspectives. During a Varsity interview, Yeung pointed out that the process of advancing from a short film into a large-scale project, led the team to create work of high quality while working under tight schedules and high pressure, due to their lack of experience, while comparing their stumbling naivete to the fully matured Japanese animation industry.

The film was showcased as a "Work-in-progress" at Annecy 2024, revealing unreleased content and the seven-year production journey, gaining international recognition. Visually, the film maintains the "digital picture book" aesthetic of the short, combining hand-painted watercolor with 3D techniques to present a unique East Asian style. Furthermore, in 2025, the Hong Kong Digital Entertainment Association established a "Hong Kong Pavilion" at Annecy to promote Hong Kong animation works like Another World and help expand their international market

== Voice cast ==
=== 2019 short film ===
- Kay Tse as Gudo
- Rosa Maria Velasco as Yuri
- Linda Chow as Little Ghost A
- Polly Yeung as Little Ghost B, Girl, Mother
- Daniel Chan Yee-Heng as Man, Soldier

=== 2025 feature film ===
- Chung Suet Ying as Gudo
- Christy Choi Hiu Tung as Yuri/Ying
- Louis Cheung as Dark Sky
- Kay Tse as Goddess
- Will Or as Keung
- Goofy Yeung Nga Man as Princess Goran
- Ko Hon Man as The King
- Yuen Tin Yan as Hardy
- Christine Li Yun Chi as Keung (Young)/Yao'er
- Mona Ching Man Yi as Noblewoman
- Chan Yuk Hang as Duan
- Kay Wong as Eunuch
- Ken Siu as Hung
- Benny Wong Chi Ming as Grandfather
- Antonio Cheung Chun Shing as General Mok
- Raymond Fung Chi Fai as Goran's Uncle
- Li Ka Fai as Nyer General
- Gilbert Lee Kin Leung as Nyer Official
- Gary Lee, Oscar Or as Nyer Soldiers
- Huang Zi Zhen as Flower City Maid
- Cheng Wai Ho as Farmer in Wheat Village
- Chiang Ziya as Nana
- Louise Chan On Ying as Mark
- Li Shok Chun as Peter, Xiao Wen
- Leung Wai Ka as Crowd Member

== Production team ==
- Technical Director: Jam Cheng
- Art Director: Step Cheung
- Voice Director: Antonio Cheung Chun Shing

== Songs ==
Type	Name	Composer	Lyricist	Vocal Artist
Theme Song	"Until We Meet Again"	Vicky Fung Wing Ki	Vicky Fung Wing Ki	On Chan

== Release ==
The film premiered globally on June 11–13, in the "Midnight Special" section of 2025's Annecy. Distribution rights are held by Edko Films in Hong Kong and Acau, while the North American rights are acquired by GKIDS. The film's international premiere was at 2025's Annecy, with subsequent release in Hong Kong and Macau on October 29, 2025. It was selected as the opening film of the 22nd Hong Kong Asian Film Festival, before premiering in Hong Kong on October 22, 2025. Originally scheduled for November 1, 2025, it was moved forward to October 29 due to popular demand, with special preview screenings available on October 25 and 26. Besides Hong Kong and North America, plans for releases are included in Japan, Taiwan, France, Middle East, while negotiations are ongoing for mainland China

== Reception ==
=== Box office ===
Another World has surged past $1.8 million (HKD$14 million) at the local box office after six weeks on release since its opening on October 29. As of December 26, 2025, it had grossed $15 million in HKD.

=== Critical response ===
The film received positive reactions from critics. Cath Clarke of The Guardian awarded the film three point five stars out of four, calling the film as "the wonder of Studio Ghibli meets the gruesomeness of Game of Thrones and the dark fury of a Greek tragedy", while calling the animation "striking and deeply strange". Ashlyn Chak of South China Morning Post called the film as "not a family-friendly viewing experience", instead as "the type of animated film that showcases the ugly side of humanity with gore and psychological horror". Another South China Morning Post columnist, Edmund Lee, awarded the film four stars out of five and claimed the animation as "a morally complex film that repeatedly challenges its characters with circumstances of extreme evil" at its heart. He subsequently listed the film as the second-best Hong Kong film released in 2025.

It was listed as one of the best movies to watch in 2025 Hong Kong Asian Film Festival by South China Morning Post

=== Awards and honours ===
- Short film (2019)
  - 21st Japan TBS Digicon6 ASIA Hong Kong Award & Asia Grand Prize
  - Best Animation Short, Horizons NYC
  - Gold Award, 25th IFVA Animation Category
  - Special Jury Prize, 8th China Independent Animation Film Forum
  - Grand Prize, Montreal Animaze Festival
- Feature film (2025)
  - Selected for 2024 Annecy International Animation Film Festival "Work-in-progress"
  - In the "Midnight Special" section at Annecy 2025

Year	Award/Nomination	Category	Nominee	Result
2025	62nd Golden Horse Awards	Best Animated Feature	Another World	Won
2025	62nd Golden Horse Awards	Best Adapted Screenplay	Yang Baowen	Nominated
2025	62nd Golden Horse Awards	Best Original Score	Adlian Chau, CMgroovy, Vicky Fung Wing Ki	Nominated
2026	32nd Hong Kong Film Critics Society Award	Best Picture	Another World	Nominated
2026	32nd Hong Kong Film Critics Society Award	Best Director	Tommy Ng	Nominated
2026	32nd Hong Kong Film Critics Society Award	Films of Merit	Another World	Won
2026	44th Hong Kong Film Awards	Best Film	Another World	Nominated
2026	44th Hong Kong Film Awards	Best Director	Tommy Ng	Nominated
2026	44th Hong Kong Film Awards	Best Screenplay	Polly Yeung	Nominated
2026	44th Hong Kong Film Awards	Best Art Direction	Step Cheung	Nominated
2026	44th Hong Kong Film Awards	Best Sound Design	Yiu Chun Hin, Cheung Man Hoi	Nominated
2026	44th Hong Kong Film Awards	Best Original Film Score	Adlian Chau, CMgroovy, Vicky Fung Wing Ki	Nominated
2026	44th Hong Kong Film Awards	Best Original Film Song	"Until We Meet Again"	Nominated
2026	44th Hong Kong Film Awards	Best New Director	Tommy Ng	Nominated
