= Peg O' My Heart (2024 film) =

2024 Hong Kong film by Nick Cheung

- Theatrical release poster
- Traditional Chinese: 贖夢
- Jyutping: Suk^{6} Mung^{6}
- Directed by: Nick Cheung
- Screenplay by: Nick Cheung; Ryan Ling
- Produced by: Claudie Chung; Ray Pang
- Starring: Nick Cheung; Terrance Lau; Fala Chen
- Cinematography: Jason Kwan
- Edited by: Li Ka-wing
- Music by: Chan Kwong-wing; Day Tai
- Production companies: Star Talent Production; United Filmmakers Organisation
- Distributed by: Golden Scene
- Release dates: 30 April 2024 (Udine); 27 March 2025 (Hong Kong)
- Running time: 98 minutes
- Country: Hong Kong
- Language: Cantonese

Peg O' My Heart (Chinese: 贖夢) is a 2024 Hong Kong psychological thriller film directed and co-written by Nick Cheung. Cheung stars alongside Terrance Lau and Fala Chen as a taxi driver who suffers from insomnia due to constant nightmares and seeks help from a psychiatrist (Lau) to free himself from them.

Marking his fourth feature, Nick Cheung continued his noir style from previous films and began advancing the project in January 2022 with the Hong Kong Film Development Fund. Principal photography started in December of the same year in Hong Kong and wrapped up in February 2023. Cheung also performed the film's theme song "I Can Never Fall Asleep", composed by Mark Lui.

The film had its world premiere at the 26th Far East Film Festival on 30 April 2024. In March 2025, the film launched a marketing campaign featuring Nick Cheung opening a Threads account to interact with netizens, shortly before its theatrical release in Hong Kong on 27 March 2025. The campaign received positive feedback from young audiences. The film also received four nominations in the 44th Hong Kong Film Awards.

== Plot ==
Psychiatrist Dr. Man constantly suffers from nightmares of hearing a woman scream behind a half-closed door, which affects his mental health. Meanwhile, he attends a hearing by the Hospital Authority for privately investigating patients' backgrounds multiple times, violating their privacy. Even the hospital director, who usually defends him, expresses frustration, warning that this is the last time he will support him. One night after work, Man takes a taxi home, driven dangerously by Choi, who seems lethargic. Concerned about Choi's mental health, Man asks him about his sleep. Choi reveals he has not slept well for years, haunted by nightmares. Man leaves him a business card for therapy, but Choi discards it. Choi soon gets into a car crash while driving the wrong way in a tunnel due to drowsiness and is arrested. His poor mental state leads to a psychiatric evaluation by Man. Recognizing Choi, Man guides him to discuss his dreams. Choi describes being pursued by numerous ghosts and mentions seeing a fly buzzing around him. He breaks down emotionally, fearing that his wife will die without him, and is taken back into custody. After the evaluation, Man meets Dr. Ching, a former psychiatrist who claims to have the ability to enter people's dreams. Skeptical, Man dismisses Ching's abilities, but Ching suggests that facing his nightmares directly might help Man find freedom from them.

Man administers a sedative to Choi for some sleep and considers electroconvulsive therapy. However, Choi continues to experience the same nightmare of being chased, which leaves him terrified and biting a tooth off. Man's assistant Donna, knowing that Man's curiosity will get the better of him, helps him pull up a background check on Choi and his wife Fiona. Man visits Fiona for further investigation. Upon arriving, he finds the house disheveled and filled with feng shui items, while Fiona appears mentally unstable. Mistaking him for an acquaintance, she invites him in but soon has an emotional breakdown, begging him to leave her and Choi alone, forcing Man to flee. Through a contact, Man learns that Choi was once a talented financial analyst who lost a close friend's money during the 2008 financial crisis and subsequently quit his job. Choi’s ex-boss also provides surveillance footage showing Choi modifying a document on his last day of work before breaking down in tears.

In their next session, Man shares his findings with Choi and pieces together the story, where Choi is not guilty for losing his friend's money but for betraying him. Recalling past memories, Choi remembers how Fiona accrued unpayable debts during the financial crisis. He modified a contract with his friend to withdraw all the savings to repay the debts, leading to his friend's bankruptcy and eventual suicide with his family. When Choi visits his friend's burned-down house, he finds corpses surrounded by flies and a photo with a note of revenge from his friend, which fuels his nightmares. Choi cries and apologizes, while Man advises him that freedom from his nightmares can only come through admitting guilt. After meeting Choi, Man confronts his estranged father, revealing that his nightmares stem from his father's brutal beatings of his mother for stealing his money, causing her to commit suicide by leaping out of the building, while he is the one who actually stole it. Man's father apologizes for his abusive behaviors, and the two reconcile. Meanwhile, Choi, now imprisoned for fraud, is visited by Fiona. Despite his reassurances, Fiona cannot handle their separation and takes her own life, leaving Choi devastated.

In the mid-credits scene, Ching locks himself in a hotel room and enters Man's nightmare, revealing that Man has altered his dream, in which he actually pushed his mother from the building.

== Cast ==
- Nick Cheung as Choi San-keung, a taxi driver haunted by recurring nightmares
- Terrance Lau as Dr. Man, a public hospital psychiatrist who often interferes in his patients' private lives during therapy
- Fala Chen as Fiona, Choi's mentally unstable wife
- Ben Yuen as Man's father, the abusive father of Man and a street hawker
- Rebecca Zhu as Donna, a senior psychiatric nurse and Man's assistant

Also appearing in the film are Julius Brian Siswojo as Chi, Choi's childhood friend who committed suicide during the financial crisis; Carl Ng as John, a high-ranking official of the Hospital Authority; and Geoffrey Wong as the hospital director. Cast members credited as special appearances include Andy Lau as Dr. Vincent Ching, a former psychiatrist with the ability to enter people's dreams; German Cheung (Nick Cheung's cousin in real life) as Dr. Ching's bodyguard; and Natalie Hsu as Yi, a pregnant teenager seeking help from Man.

== Production ==
=== Development ===
Marking his fourth feature film, actor-director Nick Cheung conceived the project based on his personal experience of having nightmares for an entire week during his time as a cadet police officer, after witnessing a woman who had hanged herself. Cheung decided to pursue a noir style for the film, noting a lack of such genres in Hong Kong cinema over the past decade. In January 2022, the project received HK$9 million in funding from the Hong Kong Film Development Fund, marking the highest funding amount in history, and was announced that Terrance Lau would co-star. Cheung was initially reported to have cast Lau for his performances in Beyond the Dream (2019) and Anita (2021), but Cheung later clarified that he had not watched Beyond the Dream and had chosen Lau based on his physical appearance, which was deemed suitable for the character. Lau mentioned that he researched mental illness while preparing for his role in Beyond the Dream, which helped him understand his character as a psychiatrist, and cited the works of David Lynch and Lee Chang-dong as inspirations for his portrayal. He also learned scuba diving to film an underwater scene.

=== Filming ===
Principal photography began on 20 December 2022, at a mansion in Tuen Mun, Hong Kong, with Jason Kwan serving as cinematographer and Fala Chen, Ben Yuen, Rebecca Zhu, and Natalie Hsu rounding out the cast. It marks Chen's first film in Hong Kong since Tales from the Dark 2 (2013) and her return to the Hong Kong cinema after pursuing a career in Hollywood following Shang-Chi and the Legend of the Ten Rings (2021). Chen was cast at the invitation of producer Claudie Chung, who was initially reluctant to take on the role but found the character intriguing after discussing it with Nick Cheung during a costume fitting in Hong Kong. During her two-month shooting period, she split her time between Hong Kong and the United States. To prepare for her role, Chen eliminated starches from her diet and lost five to six pounds. Filming concluded in late February 2023.

=== Post-production and marketing ===
In April 2023, a teaser and character posters featuring Nick Cheung and Terrance Lau were released, along with a cover version by Cheung of Dave Wong's 1991 song "This Life No Regrets". Similar to Keeper of Darkness (2015), Cheung also performed the film's theme song, "I Can Never Fall Asleep", and produced a music video featuring himself and Fala Chen. The song was composed by Mark Lui with lyrics written by Ivory Chu. Both the song and the music video were publicly released on 28 February 2025.

In early March 2025, a photograph of Nick Cheung in Choi San-keung's costumes sleeping on the MTR was posted to social media platform Threads. An account named Choi San-keung, featuring a selfie of Nick Cheung as the profile picture, responded that it was him and requested the poster to take down the photo. The Choi San-keung account subsequently shared numerous graffiti and complained about his insomnia, which attracted attention from netizens. The account replied to comments from netizens through both text and audio messages. Cheung's co-star Fala Chen, along with several celebrities including Cloud Wan, Denis Kwok, Tyson Yoshi, and Neo Yau, interacted with the Choi San-keung account, and the account gain over 50,000 followers in two weeks. In mid-March, it was revealed that the Threads account was part of the marketing campaign for Nick Cheung's new film, with Choi San-keung being his character's name. Harper's Bazaar praised the film's marketing strategy, calling it "a victory" among young audiences and noting that it improved Nick Cheung's reputation; while Oriental Sunday remarked that the campaign was "well-received by netizens".

On 21 March 2025, Nick Cheung held an in-person marketing event by setting up a pop-up stall at Temple Street in Mong Kok, where he ate a box of siu mei rice and listened to passersby share their nightmares. On 27 April, Nick Cheung and Fala Chen acted as presenters for Best Screenplay at the 43rd Hong Kong Film Awards ceremony, where they dressed in character costumes as Choi San-keung and Fiona and performed a short skit based on their roles.

== Release ==
Peg O' My Heart had its world premiere at the 26th Far East Film Festival on 30 April 2024, followed by screenings as the closing film at the 7th Malaysia International Film Festival, and in the Panorama section at the 57th Sitges Film Festival. Distribution rights for the United Kingdom and Ireland were acquired by Central City Media in May 2024. The film premiered in Kwun Tong, Hong Kong on 24 March 2025, and was theatrically released on 27 March. It was also released in Malaysia on the same date, and premiered in Taiwan on 11 April.

== Reception ==
=== Box office ===
Peg O' My Heart topped the domestic box office for four consecutive days following its release, grossing over HK$3.37 million in its opening weekend, and climbed to HK$5 million in the first week. The total gross reached HK$10 million by the fourth week, and accumulated HK$12 million during the fifth week.

=== Critical response ===
Edmund Lee of the South China Morning Post gave Peg O' My Heart 2.5/5 stars, criticizing Nick Cheung as a "clumsy storyteller" who, despite delivering "stylish visuals" and memorable characters, fails to engage the audience due to inconsistent tonal shifts and "subpar writing" that inadequately explores the stories of both Cheung and Terrance Lau's characters, ultimately deeming the film as one that "does not deserve" a planned sequel suggested by the cameo and credit scenes. Finnlay Dall of FilmInk rated the film 7.5/10, calling it an "enjoyable watch" for its visuals and horror momentum, particularly the "full throttle nightmare sequences", but he criticized its handling of sensitive themes, including mental illness and the "laughably bad" depictions of domestic abuse, along with Fala Chen's stereotypical character portrayal, ultimately questioning its ability to resonate with modern audiences.

Alex Chung of HK01 considers Peg O' My Heart a solid film that demonstrates Cheung's matured filmmaking skills, particularly through the standout performances of Fala Chen and Terrance Lau, while noting some weaknesses in the depth of character development and plot progression. Siu Yu of am730 also praised the film as a standout work by Cheung, particularly its intense atmosphere and exploration of psychological torment, which conveyed the message that dreams reflect past sins, making it a thought-provoking film rather than just a horror experience. Huang Long Xiang of Lianhe Zaobao, while acknowledged the film's creative exploration of dreams without traditional horror elements, noted that it fell short due to its reliance on conventional tropes and a lack of genuine emotional depth, resulting in a missed opportunity for a more profound psychological experience.

== Awards and nominations ==
Year	Award	Category	Nominee	Result	Ref.
2026	44th Hong Kong Film Awards	Best Actress	Fala Chen	Nominated	
2026	44th Hong Kong Film Awards	Best Costume Make Up Design	Boey Wong	Nominated	
2026	44th Hong Kong Film Awards	Best Visual Effects	Dennis Yeung (1), Dennis Yeung (2)	Won	
2026	44th Hong Kong Film Awards	Best Original Film Song	"I Can Never Fall Asleep"	Nominated	
