= Fish Liew =

Malaysian-born Hong Kong model and actress (born 1990)

- 廖子妤
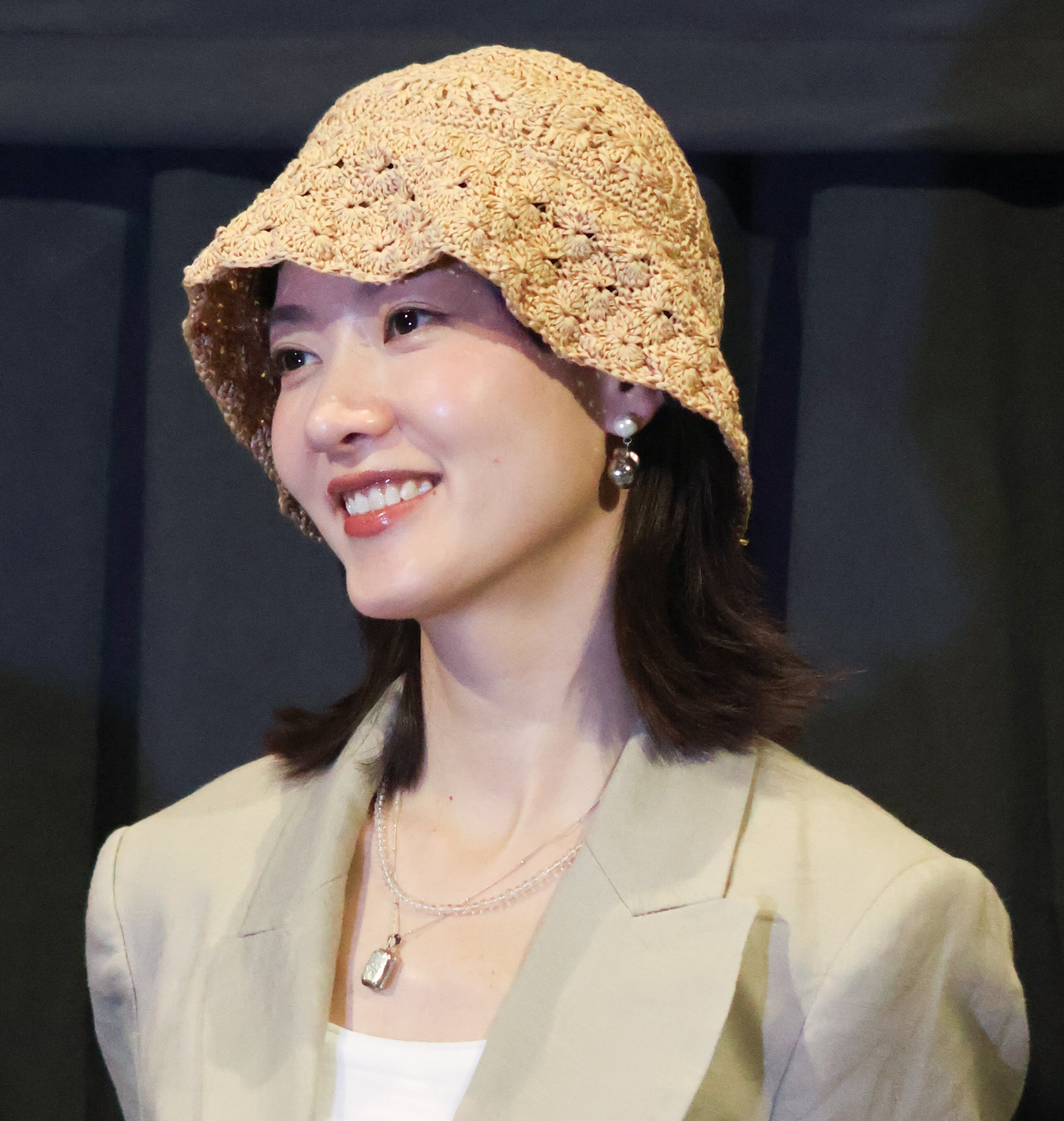
- Liew in 2026
- Born: Liew Chi-yu; 31 March 1990 (age 36); Johor Bahru, Johor, Malaysia
- Occupations: Actress; model
- Years active: 2012–present
- Awards: Full list

Fish Liew Chi-yu (Chinese: 廖子妤; born 31 March 1990) is a Malaysian-born Hong Kong actress and model. She won two Hong Kong Film Awards for Best Supporting Actress in Anita (2021) and Best Actress in Someone Like Me (2025).

== Biography ==
Liew was born on 31 March 1990, in Johor Bahru, Johor, Malaysia. In 2012, she was determined to expand her career in Hong Kong’s film industry. With her first film, Doomsday Party, she earned her first nomination for Best New Performer at the 33rd Hong Kong Film Awards.

She received a nomination, Best Supporting Actress for her performance in Sisterhood, at the 36th Hong Kong Film Awards.

In 2022, Liew received two nominations for Best Supporting Actor at the 40th Hong Kong Film Awards for her performance in the biopic Anita and the thriller Limbo. She won Best Supporting Actress for her role Ann Mui in the biopic Anita.

She was once again shortlisted for the 42nd Hong Kong Film Awards and nominated for the Best Supporting Actress in film A Guilty Conscience.

In 2026, she won the Best Actress award at the 44th Hong Kong Film Awards, the 32nd Hong Kong Film Critics Society Award and the 21st Hong Kong Film Directors' Guild Awards for her performance in the film Someone Like Me. She is the second Malaysian-born Hong Kong Film Awards Best Actress winner.

== Filmography ==
=== Films ===
Year	Film	Role	Notes	Ref.
2013	Doomsday Party	Fish		
2014	Twilight Online	Lam Siu-yu		
2015	Lazy Hazy Crazy	Alice		
2016	Sisterhood	Sei (young)		
2016	Pseudo Secular	Li Er		
2017	Love Off the Cuff	Night club twins		
2018	No. 1 Chung Ying Street	Sze Wai/Lai Wah		
2018	Distinction	Shun		
2021	Anita	Ann Mui		
2021	Limbo	Coco		
2022	Table for Six	Mother		
2023	A Guilty Conscience	Victoria Chung		
2023	Lonely Eighteen	Jacky		
2023	Ready Or Rot	"Double 8"		
2023	Trolls Band Together	Viva	Cantonese dubbing	
2024	Table for Six 2	Mother		
2024	All Shall Be Well	Fanny		
2024	Twilight of the Warriors: Walled In	Fanny		
2024	Cesium Fallout	Zoe		
2024	An Abandoned Team	Zoie		
2025	Remember What I Forgot	Ginger		
2025	Pavane for an Infant	Lai Sum		
2025	The Remnant	Fa		
2025	Someone Like Me	Mui		
2025	My Date with a Vampire	Yamamoto Future		
2025	Back to the Past	Man Song		
2026	Girlfriends	Lok	Premiere at the Busan in September	
2026	Night King	Mimi		
2026	Cold War 1994	Rosamund Yi-Sum Keswyk-Poon		
2026	Dog Day Evening	The Mascot, Lucky		
2026	Beyond Hostage Crisis	Leta		

=== Dramas ===
Year	Title	Chinese title	Role	Notes	Ref.
2020	Who Sell Bricks in Hong Kong 地產仔		Yu Wan		
2023	Beyond the Common Ground 和解在後				
2023	Sparks 冰上火花		Wing		
2024	Margaret & David Tie 瑪嘉烈與大衛系列 絲絲		Margaret		
2024	Cicada Cycle 十七年命運週期		Tomato		
2025	City of Light 光明大押		Jennifer Ho		

=== Music video appearances ===
Year	Title
2022	Jay Fung - "Take A Breath"
2022	Jeremy Lee - "Half"
2021	Panther Chan - "I Wanna Be With You"
2021	Manson Cheung - "無可救藥的浪漫"

== Awards and nominations ==
Award	Year	Nominee / Work	Category	Result	Ref.
Hong Kong Film Awards	2014	Doomsday Party	Best New Performer	Nominated	
Hong Kong Film Awards	2017	Sisterhood	Best Supporting Actress	Nominated	
Hong Kong Film Awards	2022	Anita	Best Supporting Actress	Won	
Hong Kong Film Awards	2022	Limbo	Best Supporting Actress	Nominated	
Hong Kong Film Awards	2024	A Guilty Conscience	Best Supporting Actress	Nominated	
Hong Kong Film Awards	2026	Someone Like Me	Best Actress	Won	
Hong Kong Film Critics Society Award	2026	Someone Like Me	Best Actress	Won	
Hong Kong Film Directors' Guild Awards	2026	Someone Like Me	Best Actress	Won	
Hong Kong Screenwriters' Guild Awards	2026	Someone Like Me	Best Film Character of the Year	Nominated	
