= Ben Yuen =

Hong Kong actor

- 袁富華
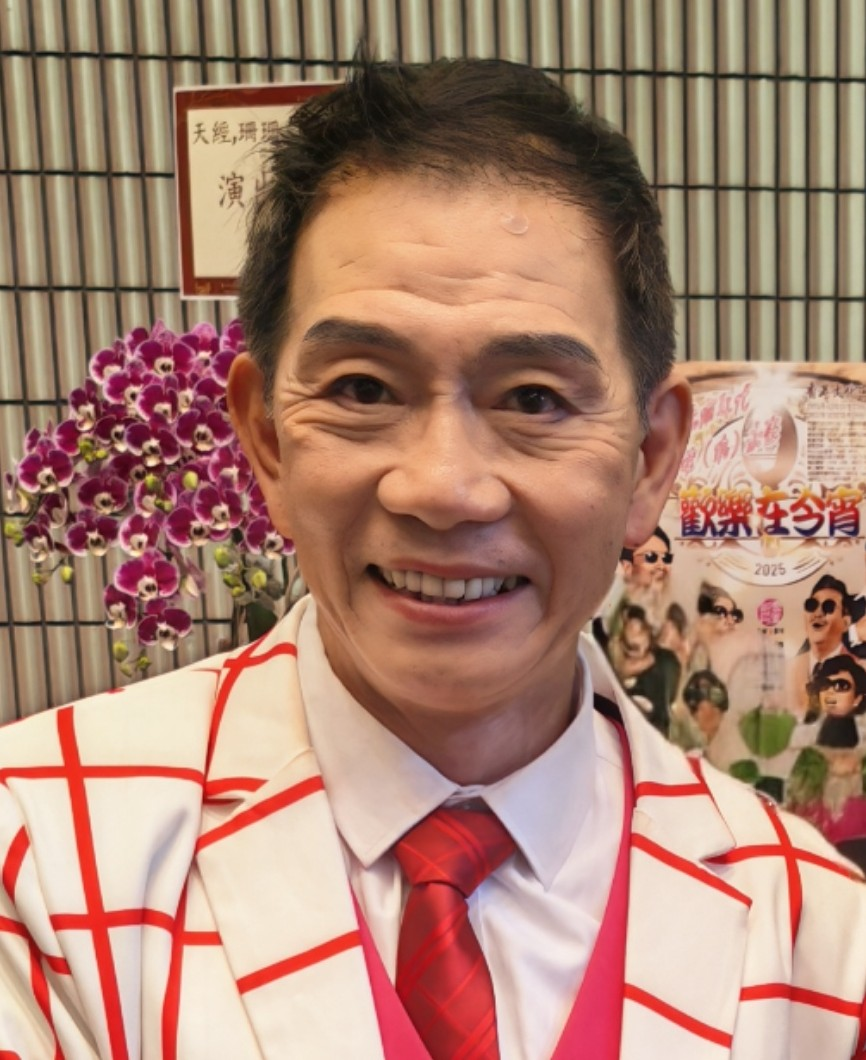
- Yuen in December 2025
- Born: February 12, 1964 (age 62); British Hong Kong
- Occupation: Actor
- Years active: 1988–present
- Awards: Golden Horse Award – Best Supporting Actor; 2018 Tracey Hong Kong Film Award – Best Supporting Actor; 2019 Tracey Golden Rooster Award – Best Supporting Actor; 2025 The Dumpling Queen

Ben Yuen (Chinese: 袁富華; born 12 February 1964) is a Hong Kong actor.

Yuen began his film career in 1995. He won the Golden Horse Award for Best Supporting Actor in 2018. He was nominated in the Golden Horse Award for Best Leading Actor the following year.

== Selected filmography ==
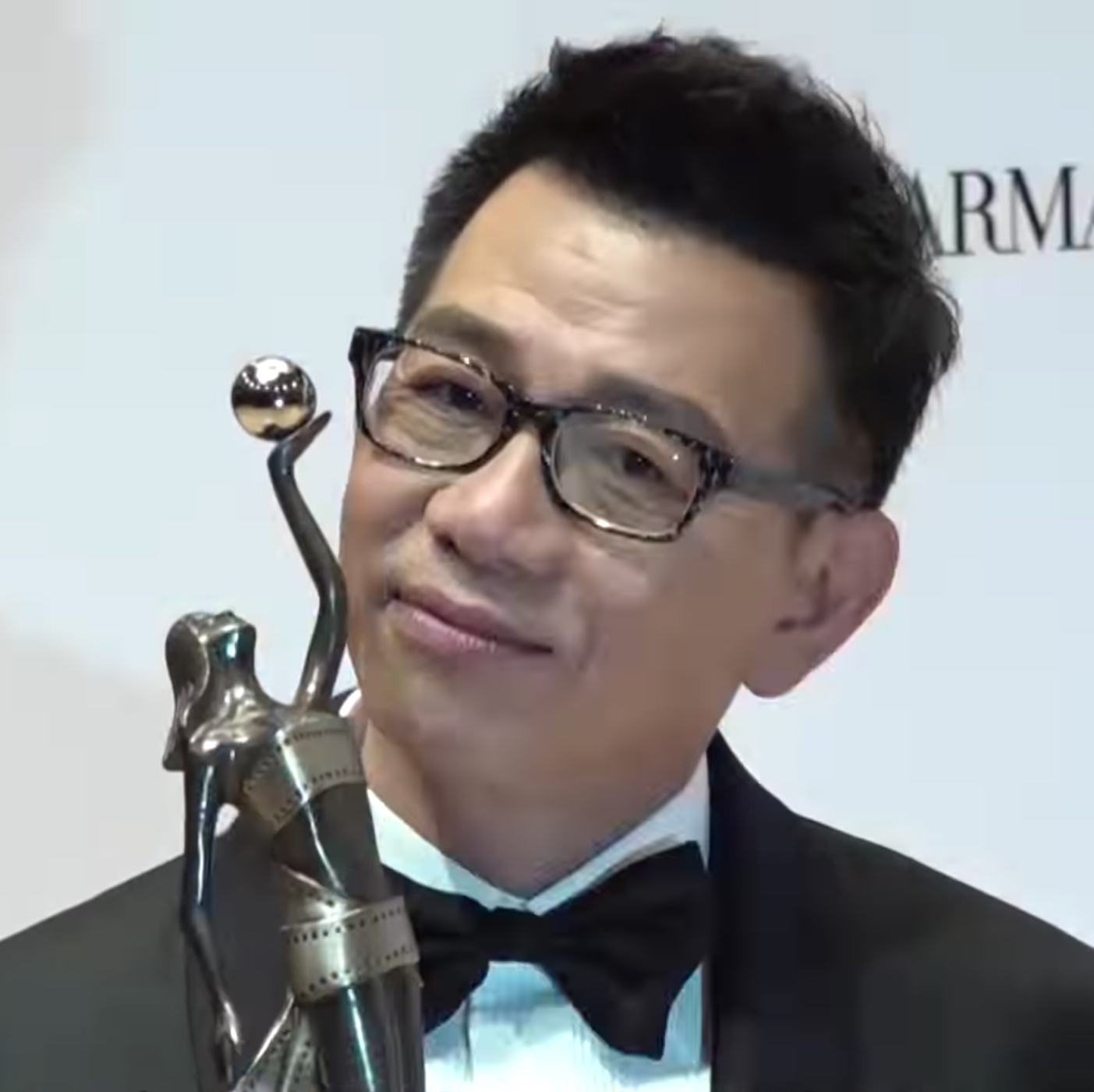
Yuen with his Best Supporting Actor Award at the 38th Hong Kong Film Awards

- Smashing Frank (2025)
- Peg O' My Heart (2024)
- The Pig, The Snake and The Pigeon (2023)
- Raging Fire (2021)
- One Second Champion (2021)
- Suk Suk (2019)
- Tracey (2018)
- Trivisa (2016)
- Helios (2015)
- Overheard 3 (2014)
- Rule No. 1 (2008)
- Confession of Pain (2006)
- Bullets of Love (2001)
- Fighting for Love (2001)
- King of Comedy (1999)
- A True Mob Story (1998)
