= One Cool Group Limited =

Hong Kong film production company

- Type: Holding company
- Industry: Entertainment
- Founded: 2013; 13 years ago
- Founder: Louis Koo
- Headquarters: 3/F, Milkyway Bldg 77, Hung To Rd, Kwun Tong, Hong Kong
- Area served: Worldwide
- Products: Film
- Services: Film financing, production, post-production and distribution Sound and visual effects Film promotion Artist management Cinematic equipment rental
- Subsidiaries: One Cool Film Production Limited; One Cool Pictures Limited; One Cool CMC Limited; One Cool Production Limited; One Cool Animation Limited; One Cool Film Cut Company Limited; One Cool Sound Limited; One Cool Cut Limited; Fatface Production Limited; One Cool Artist Management Limited; One Cool Jam Cast Artiste Management Limited; One Cool Jacso Entertainment Limited; One Cool Hang Wan Rental Limited
- Website: www.onecool.com

One Cool Group Limited
- Traditional Chinese: 天下一集團有限公司
- Simplified Chinese: 天下一集团有限公司
Transcriptions
Yue: Cantonese
- Jyutping: Tin1 Haa6 Jat1 Zaap5 Tyun4 Jau5 Haan6 Gung1 Si1

One Cool Group Limited (Chinese: 天下一集團有限公司) is a Hong Kong company founded by actor and film producer Louis Koo in 2013. One Cool Group engages films business such as financing, production, post-production, distribution and promotion, as well as artist management business and film equipment rental services.

== Scopes of operation ==
Category	Company	Services
Film services	One Cool Film Production Limited (天下一電影製作有限公司)	Film financing and production
Film services	One Cool CMC Limited (華人文化天下一有限公司)	Film financing
Film services	One Cool Pictures Limited (天下一電影發行有限公司)	Film distribution
Post-production	One Cool Production Limited (天下製作有限公司)	Digital color grading Online editing Visual effects for film DCP mastering Audio post-production
Post-production	One Cool Film Cut Company Limited (天下一電影剪接有限公司)	Film editing
Post-production	One Cool Sound Limited (天下一音效有限公司)	Sound design Music production Sound editing Audio mixing Sound effects creation
Post-production	One Cool Cut Limited (天下一展有限公司)	Offline editing Online special effects CG post-production for film, TV commercials, animation and MTV
Computer graphics	Fatface Production Limited (發輝製作室有限公司)	Visual effects Post production
Animation	One Cool Animation (天下一動畫)	
Artist management	One Cool Artist Management Limited (天下一藝人管理有限公司)	Artist management agent representation
Artist management	One Cool Jam Cast Artist Management Limited (天下一將士藝人管理有限公司)	Training local talent Assisting young artists for performance opportunities
Artist management	One Cool Jasco Entertainment Limited (天加一文化傳媒有限公司)	Artiste management and training in China; Web drama development in China; Hosting concerts/events of Korean Artists.
Cinematic Equipment Rental	One Cool Hang Wan Rental Limited (天下一恆運租賃有限公司)	Providing video, lighting and support equipment
Dubbing and Voice Acting	One Cool BB Dub Production House (天下一聲優館)	Dubbing production, Artist articulation and Voice Acting Training

== Filmography ==
The films produced by the company under One Cool Films and/or One Cool CMC and distributed by One Cool Pictures

Year	English title	Chinese title	Notes
2014	Naked Ambition 2	3D豪情	
2014	Golden Chicken 3	金雞SSS	
2015	12 Golden Ducks	12金鴨	
2015	Triumph in the Skies	衝上雲霄	
2015	Little Big Master	五個小孩的校長	
2015	Wild City	迷城	
2015	Keeper of Darkness	陀地驅魔人	
2015	Lazy Hazy Crazy	同班同學	
2015	Get Outta Here	死開啲啦	
2016	Line Walker	使徒行者	
2016	Heartfall Arises	驚心破	
2016	Sisterhood	骨妹	
2017	Meow	喵星人	
2017	The Empty Hands	空手道	
2018	In Your Dreams	以青春的名義	Distributor only
2018	The Trough	低壓槽	
2018	Men on the Dragon	逆流大叔	
2018	Tracey	翠絲	
2019	A Witness Out of the Blue	犯罪現場	
2019	Line Walker 2: Invisible Spy	使徒行者2：諜影行動	
2020	The Secret Diary of a Mom to Be	Baby復仇記	
2021	Ready o/r Knot	不日成婚	
2021	All U Need Is Love	總有愛在隔離	
2021	The Mitchells vs. the Machines	一家人大戰機械人	Co-production with Columbia Pictures and Sony Pictures Animation
2021	Vivo	蜜熊仔維沃	Co-production with Columbia Pictures and Sony Pictures Animation
2021	Raging Fire	怒火	
2021	Madalena	馬達•蓮娜	
2021	Zero to Hero	媽媽的神奇小子	
2021	Anita	梅艷芳	
2022	Warriors of Future	明日戰記	
2022	Marmaduke	酷狗馬馬杜	Co-production with StoryBerry and Legacy Classics
2022	Table for Six	飯戲攻心	
2023	Shadows	殘影空間	
2023	Over My Dead Body	死屍死時四十四	
2023	Social Distancing	電子靈	
2023	La Luna	TBA	Co-production with Clover Films, ACT 2 Pictures, and Papahan Films
2024	The Garfield Movie	加菲貓：農場大冒險	Co-production with Columbia Pictures, Alcon Entertainment, Prime Focus, DNEG Animation, and Wayfarer Studios
2024	Twilight of the Warriors: Walled In	九龍城寨之圍城	
2024	Gold	TBA	Co-production with Astro Shaw, ACT 2 Pictures, and Clover FIlms
2025	Sons of the Neon Night	風林火山	
2025	Back to the Past	尋秦記	
2026	The Angry Birds Movie 3	憤怒鳥大電影3	Co-production with Paramount Pictures, Rovio Entertainment, Sega Sammy Group, Prime Focus, DNEG Animation, Flywheel Media, and Dentsu
	Love Revolution	愛·革命	Post-production
	Remember What I Forgot	曾經擁有	Post-production
	A Life of Papers	紙皮婆婆	Post-production
	Beyond the Sin	惡行之外	Post-production
	The Trier of Fact	守闕者	Post-production
	Behind the Shadows	尾隨	Post-production
	Storm Cloud	風雲	Pre-production
	The Mighty Palms of Taghagata	如來神掌	Pre-production
	When It All Begins	雞蛋仔	Pre-production
	Un Coeur D'Artichaut	暖暖‧暖男	Pre-production
	Hercules Xue	力神薛仁貴	Pre-production
	The Little Big Monsters	(大猩小怪)	Pre-production
	Under Control	一線生機	Pre-production
	Personal Best	逆走人生	Pre-production
	You Only Live Once	YOLO	Pre-production
	The Dream, The Bubble and the Shadow Trailer	誰變走了大佛	Post-production
