= Sons of the Neon Night =

2025 Hong Kong crime thriller film

- Theatrical release poster
- Traditional Chinese: 風林火山
- Simplified Chinese: 风林火山
- Hanyu Pinyin: Fēng Lín Huǒ Shān
- Jyutping: Fung^{1} Lam^{4} Fo^{2} Saan^{1}
- Directed by: Juno Mak
- Written by: Juno Mak
- Produced by: Juno Mak; Percy Cheung; Catherine Hun
- Starring: Takeshi Kaneshiro; Sean Lau; Tony Leung Ka-fai; Louis Koo; Gao Yuanyuan
- Cinematography: Sion Michel
- Edited by: William Chang
- Music by: Nate Connelly
- Production companies: One Cool Film Production; Sil-Metropole Organisation; J.Q. Pictures; Fortis Films (China) Limited; Shaw Brothers Pictures; Sons Company Limited; Er Dong Pictures; Peeli Ventures; Xiaomi Pictures
- Release dates: 17 May 2025 (Cannes); 1 October 2025 (Hong Kong)
- Running time: 125 minutes (theatrical cut); 132 minutes (Cannes)
- Country: Hong Kong
- Language: Cantonese
- Budget: US$50 million
- Box office: US$13.4 million (Note: See Box office)

Sons of the Neon Night (Chinese: 風林火山; Jyutping: Fung1 Lam4 Fo2 Saan1) is a 2025 Hong Kong crime thriller film written, co-produced, and directed by Juno Mak. It stars an ensemble cast led by Takeshi Kaneshiro, Sean Lau, Tony Leung Ka-fai, Louis Koo, and Gao Yuanyuan.

Production began in June 2017, and wrapped up in March 2018. It was originally set for release in 2019, but post-production was interrupted by the COVID-19 pandemic, resuming only once the pandemic ended.

The film had its world premiere at the Midnight Screenings section of the 78th Cannes Film Festival on 17 May 2025. It was theatrically released in Hong Kong on 1 October 2025. It was selected as Hong Kong's official entry for Best International Feature Film at the 99th Academy Awards.

== Plot ==
In an alternate 1994, a sudden explosion erupts in snowbound Causeway Bay, killing a wealthy Hong Kong businessman and igniting a fierce conflict between drug traffickers and those who oppose them. An investigation reveals that the chaos was part of a meticulously planned, unhinged series of actions orchestrated by the heir of a drug trafficking syndicate. Declaring war with the mission to create "a world without drugs" and change his family's legacy, his actions plunge both the world above and the underworld below into utter turmoil.

== Cast ==
- Takeshi Kaneshiro as Moreton Li (Li Mo-tung), the youngest son of the Li family who hopes to become an heir to his financial company and wipe out the dark history of his family
- Sean Lau as Wong Chi-tat, a double-faced police officer
- Tony Leung Ka-fai as Dik Man-kit, a former police inspector who also moonlights as a criminal psychologist
- Louis Koo as Ching Man-sing, a killer with a complicated past
- Gao Yuanyuan as Lau Sze-yan, a retired therapist and Moreton’s lover
- Alex To as Maddox Li (Li Man-dik), a fugitive criminal, eldest son of the Li family and older brother to Moreton who hopes to continue drug trafficking and extend his family’s legacy
- Nina Paw as Sister Huan (欢姊), a weapons handler
- Michelle Wai as Little, a police officer
- Wyman Wong as Baldy
- Jiang Peiyao as Little Yip, an assassin
- Rosa Maria Velasco
- Carl Ng as Alex, a cop
- Wilson Lam
- Ching Tung
- Tony Liu
- Clement Fung
- Lo Hoi-pang
- Jerald Chan
- Lowell Lo
- Kam Kwok-leung
- Jason Choi
- Conan Lee
- Wang Shunde
- Philippe Joly as Enzo

== Production ==
=== Development ===
The project was first announced on 25 March at the 2015 Hong Kong Filmart as Juno Mak's second directorial feature after the 2013 film, Rigor Mortis. According to Mak, the film's script took over five years to develop. In June 2017, it was reported that the film has begun production with a budget of HK$150 million and confirmed cast members of Takeshi Kaneshiro, Sean Lau, Louis Koo and Tony Leung Ka-fai.

=== Filming ===
On 25 September 2017, filming of a snowing scene took place outside Windsor House, despite being 30 °C, in which Lau took part in. On 28 September 2017, the film held its first press conference, where director Mak and cast members Sean Lau, Tony Leung Ka-fai, Gao Yuanyuan and Michelle Wai attended. A two-minute behind-the-scene featurette, the teaser film poster and various character photostills were released. It was also revealed the film crew constructed a 1:1 replica of Causeway Bay in Huizhou for the shooting of the film's large scale opening.

On 27 March 2018, it was reported that production for the film has officially wrapped up after eight months of filming, with another two minute behind-the-scene featurette being released.

=== Post-production ===
By August 2020, it was reported that the budget had ballooned from HK$200 million to HK$400 million, making it the most expensive Hong Kong production to date.

On 21 March 2018, Juno Mak promoted the film at the 2018 Hong Kong Filmart, where he revealed the film is planned for release in 2019. In 2020, it was reported that the film was expected to be released in 2021. In October 2024, Juno Mak revealed that post-production was nearly complete and that a release was expected for early 2025.

In October 2024, Juno Mak told Variety that the film was in post-production for two years when it was indefinitely paused due to the COVID-19 pandemic. They only resumed work on the film after the pandemic ended, with Mak attributing the delay to "technical issues, not a rethink of the story".

== Release ==
In April 2025, Sons of the Neon Night was selected to be screened out of competition in the Midnight Screenings section at the 78th Cannes Film Festival, where it had its world premiere on 17 May 2025. The film was theatrically released in Hong Kong on 1 October 2025.

== Reception ==
=== Box office ===
Sons of the Neon Night has grossed a total of US$13.4 million worldwide combining its box office gross from Hong Kong (US$1.4 million) and China (US$12 million).

=== Critical response ===
Elizabeth Kerr of Screen International described Sons of the Neon Night as a highly ambitious and "lushly constructed" epic that, despite its "desaturated palette", "post-apocalyptic industrial chic production design", and Juno Mak's efforts to redefine the crime thriller genre, was "hampered by choppy pacing and storytelling", with its ineffective narrative and worldbuilding attributed to the seven-hour rough cut that removed many connections and emotional depths between characters, leading her to suggest it would work better as "an excellent miniseries". Graeme Guttmann of Screen Rant found the film "hyper-stylized", highlighting its "precise editing and light camera work" that creates a composition reminiscent of a music video, but lamented the lack of narrative cohesion, character development, and emotional depth, which makes it difficult for the audience to engage.

=== Accolades ===
At the 44th Hong Kong Film Awards, Sons of the Neon Night won eight awards: Best Supporting Actor (Alex To), Best Cinematography (Sion Michel and Richard Bluck), Best Editing (William Chang), Best Art Direction (Juno Mak, Yee Chung-man, Ambrose Chow Sai-hung, and Jona Sees), Best Costume and Makeup Design (Somad and Uma Wang), Best Original Film Score (Ryuichi Sakamoto and Nate Connelly), Best Sound Design (Nopawat Likitwong, Poolpetch Hatthakitkosol, and Dhanarat Dhitirojana), and Best Visual Effects (Enoch Chan, Yu Yat-tung, Chris Chow, and Felix Lai Tsz-fei). It also received four nominations for Best Film, Best Supporting Actress (Nina Paw), Best Action Choreography (Tang Sui-wa and Xiong Xinxin), and Best New Director (Mak).

== See also ==
- List of submissions to the 99th Academy Awards for Best International Feature Film
- List of Hong Kong submissions for the Academy Award for Best International Feature Film
