= Panther Chan =

Hong Kong female singer

- 陳蕾
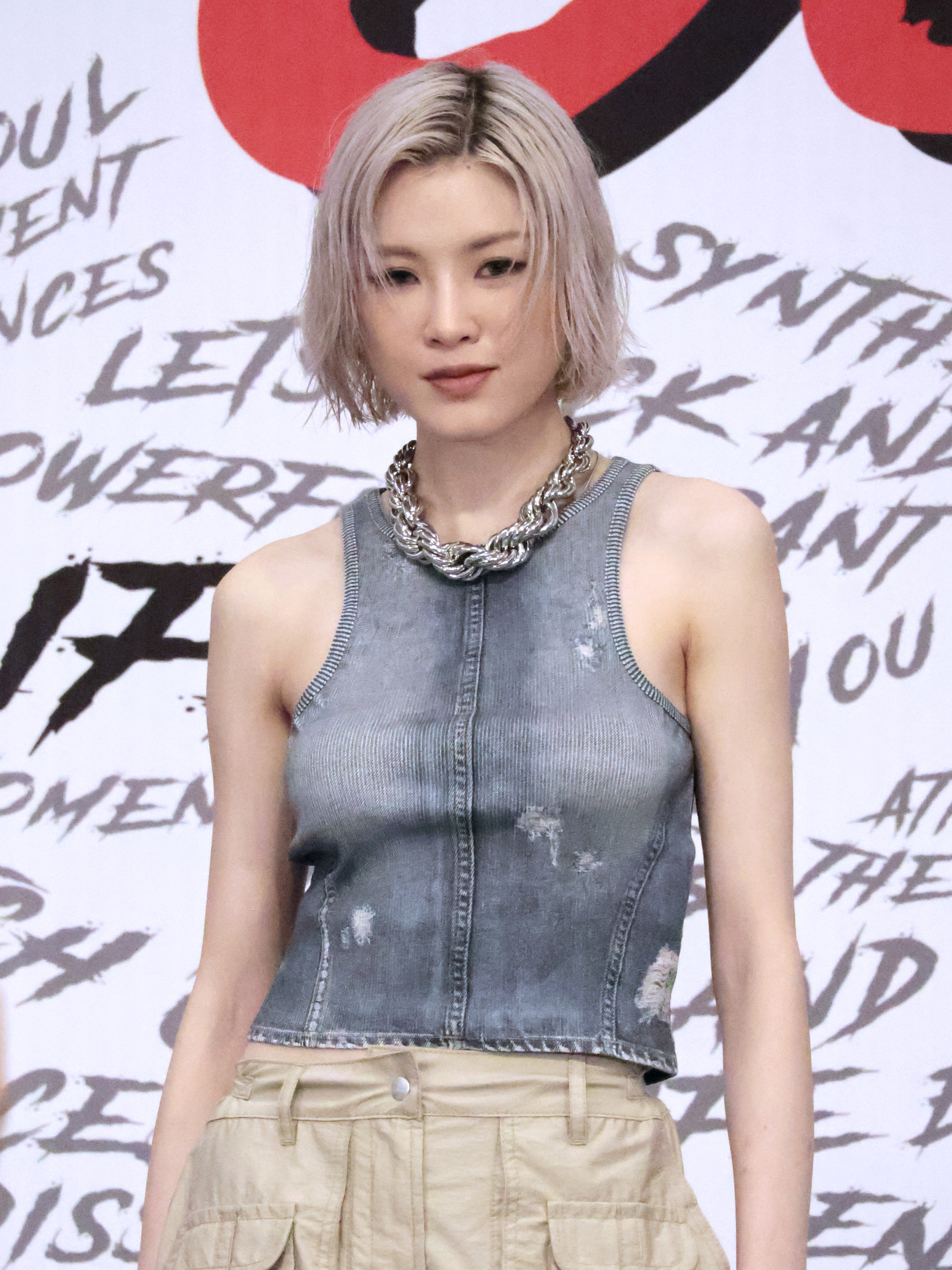
- Chan at New Town Plaza in 2024
- Born: Guangzhou, China
- Occupation: Singer
- Agents: Warner Music Hong Kong
- Musical career
- Years active: 2009–present

Chinese name
- Traditional Chinese: 陳蕾
- Simplified Chinese: 陈蕾
Transcriptions

Signature
- Musical career
- Genres: C-pop
- Labels: Cactus Creation (2017–2019); Warner Music (2019–present)

Panther Chan Lei (Chinese: 陳蕾) is a Hong Kong singer-songwriter. She joined the first season of Asian Millionstar, organized by Asia Television, when she was 18 years old.

== Biography ==
Chan was 3rd runner up in the first season of Asian Millionstar and released her debut song "Fever" (發燒) in 2016.

At the end of 2023, Chan won the first "Gold Award for Ultimate Female Singer" in her singing career and 3 more awards at the Ultimate Song Chart Awards Presentation 2023.

== Discography ==
Studio albums

- 1029 (2019)
- Honesty (2021)
- Mindfulness (念) (2024)

== Concerts ==
| Name | Date | Venue | Ref. |
|---|---|---|---|
| Runaway·Come Home Concert | 22 February 2019 | SD Live House @ Guangzhou | |
| 1029 Concert | 3 May 2019 | Music Zone, KITEC | |
| Orange & Blue Concert | 14 September 2019 | Drama Theatre, Hong Kong Academy for Performing Arts | |
| Sramana Concert 2021 | 28-31 October 2021 | Macpherson Stadium, Hong Kong | |
| Panther Chan Live 2024 Mindfulness | 2-5 March 2024 | Hong Kong Coliseum | |

== Awards ==
=== Music awards ===
| Year | Award ceremony | Platform | Venue | Category | Result | Criteria |
|---|---|---|---|---|---|---|
| 2024 | Ultimate Song Chart Awards Presentation 2023 | CRHK | AsiaWorld–Arena, AsiaWorld–Expo | Ultimate Female Singers | Golden | CRHK Airplay |
| 2024 | Ultimate Song Chart Awards Presentation 2023 | CRHK | AsiaWorld–Arena, AsiaWorld–Expo | Ultimate Singer-songwriters | Silver | CRHK Airplay |
| 2024 | Ultimate Song Chart Awards Presentation 2023 | CRHK | AsiaWorld–Arena, AsiaWorld–Expo | Top 10 Songs of the Year | No.3 - "Bungee Gum" | CRHK Airplay |
| 2024 | Ultimate Song Chart Awards Presentation 2023 | CRHK | AsiaWorld–Arena, AsiaWorld–Expo | Audience's Favourite Female Singer | Won | Online Voting |
