= Trial & Error (company) =

Hong Kong video production company

Trial & Error Limited
- Logo of 試當真 Trial & Error
- Native name: 試當真
- Type: Private company
- Industry: Film production
- Founded: October 2020; 5 years ago
- Founders: Neo Yau; Hui Yin; So Chi Ho
- Headquarters: Flat B, 3/F, Shui Wing Industrial Building, 12-22 Tai Yuen Street; Kwai Chung, New Territories; Hong Kong
- Products: Internet video
- Website: https://www.trialanderror924.com/

試當真 Trial & Error

YouTube information
- Channel: 試當真 Trial & Error
- Years active: 2020–present
- Subscribers: 640 thousand
- Views: 225 million
- Last updated: 13 September 2026

Trial & Error
- Traditional Chinese: 試當真有限公司
- Simplified Chinese: 试当真有限公司
Transcriptions
Standard Mandarin
- Hanyu Pinyin: Shì Dàngzhēn Yǒuxiàn Gōngsī
Yue: Cantonese
- Jyutping: Si^{3} Dong^{1} Zan^{1} Jau^{5} Haan^{6} Gung^{1} Si^{1}

Trial & Error Limited (traditional Chinese: 試當真有限公司; simplified Chinese: 试当真有限公司) is a Hong Kong video production company that creates online comedic skits. The group's YouTube channel was started in October 2020 by Neo Yau, Hui Yin and So Chi Ho.

Yau, who had previously had film and television roles, said his motivation for establishing the YouTube channel was anger that the traditional media failed to allow people in his generation to express themselves. He proposed the channel's creation to Hui and So, who had previous experience running YouTube channels. Six months after its establishment, the YouTube channel received almost 200 million views and nearly 200,000 subscribers. Trial & Error accrued the most subscribers of all Hong Kong channels in 2021, having in a little over a year of its founding produced 210 videos and accrued over 350,000 subscribers.

Trial & Error's content is heavily influenced by Stephen Chow's work. The group's videos include game shows, music videos, funny sketches, and parodies of popular songs and movies, through which the channel's founders share their thoughts about interactions with others, workplace politics, and what is currently in vogue. Frequently featuring slapstick, mo lei tau humour, and preposterous practical jokes, its videos are analogies of what it is like to be a Hong Kong resident. The group released several satirical songs by parodying a Dear Jane song and lampooning Mirror. In June 2021, they released "Hai Gum Sin La", which the South China Morning Post's Emily Tsang said alludes to the "inner struggle" that people have over many Hong Kong people moving abroad.

== History ==
The Chinese name of Trial & Error, "試當真", is a film studio term of art meaning that during shooting, the team should film with an attempt mentality and without fear of failure. It was founded by the actor Neo Yau and the YouTubers Hui Yin, and So Chi Ho in October 2020. All three founders were born in Hong Kong. Hui and So, who had been former secondary school classmates, had been making YouTube videos on the Diamond Crew (Chinese: 金剛Crew) channel. Yau invited the duo, who had also run the YouTube channel CapTV (Chinese: 擷電視), to join him in founding Trial & Error. Yau had earlier experience in running the YouTube channel Mocking Jer (Chinese: 學舌鳥). With prior experience in being a film and television actor, Yau decided to return to making YouTube videos because of the change in climate and the opportunities for creation. He said that anger was the motivating factor for creating the channel because he felt that film and television did not give people in his generation the opportunity for expression. Ho said his motivating factor for cofounding the group was "being poor" and having nothing else to do after he and Hui completing writing the script for the ViuTV television series Generation Slash. In less than a half a year of its founding, Locker Lam, Kaki Sham, Jessica Chan, Kathy Ngai, and Yanny Chan became group members.

As the founders had little capital, their initial videos were very low-budget and made in their homes. Within half a year of its founding, the group accrued almost 200 million views and nearly 200,000 subscribers and made enough revenue to rent a studio and pay employees' salaries. It made money through advertising and contributions from the group's followers. After China enacted the Hong Kong national security law in 2020, a number of books and movies were barred and numerous Hong Kong entertainers became fearful about its impact on their work. In this context, the group became popular. Yau said in an interview in 2021, "It's all about how you pop in and out of the grey areas. The grey area is where we survive. If we lose this space, between the red lines, then we quit. Or we die." On 20 April 2021, Trial & Error participated in a livestream with fellow Hong Kong YouTube channels Arm Channel TV, FHProductionHK, and Pomato to discuss their films. Over 20 people from the four groups took part in the almost four-hour-long livestream, which at peak had 15,000 watchers. In December 2021, YouTube released its Hong Kong channel rankings of who had accrued the most subscribers. Trial & Error, which had gained the most subscribers that year, was ranked number one, having in a little over a year of its founding produced 210 videos and accrued over 350,000 subscribers. The group had several videos that had accrued over one million videos, including "Don't tell me that she has a boyfriend" (Chinese: 唔通佢有男朋友), "Traffic jam on Tsun Yip Street" (Chinese: 哪裡只塞駿業里), and "Channel needs girls" (Chinese: Channel需要女).

In April 2022, Yau announced that the group would release a non-fungible token (NFT) called Next Trial Run (NTR) in which purchasers could buy a membership to support the channel. Purchasers would receive benefits including early purchase of tickets for live shows and "artist training classes". According to am730, netizens criticised the move as "exploiting other supporters" and hoped the group would use another method to raise money. The group set a limit of 6,000 tokens that would be sold. In one day, people purchased one-third of the tokens, earning the group HK$10,000,000 (US$1,287,001).

== Members ==
=== Actors ===
- Neo Yau is a founder of the channel. After receiving a degree from the Hong Kong Academy for Performing Arts, he received attention for his role in the film She Remembers, He Forgets. He wrote, directed, and acted in the ViuTV television series Haters Gonna Stay.
- Hui Yin is a founder of the channel. He and So were screenwriters for the ViuTV television series Generation Slash and are part of the musical duo MC $oHo & KidNey.
- So Chi Ho is a founder of the channel. He and Hui were screenwriters for the ViuTV television series Generation Slash and are part of the musical duo MC $oHo & KidNey.
- Locker Lam was recruited to the channel by Neo Yau within six months of its founding. On the ViuTV television show Haters Gonna Stay, Yau starred and Lam made a guest appearance. According to Yau, although Lam's character had few speaking lines and primarily expressed himself through facial expressions, Lam showed a "very special sense of humour". Lam's first foray into entertainment was the 2016 film Weeds on Fire, and he subsequently appeared in the films P Storm and A Witness Out of the Blue and the ViuTV shows Who Sells Bricks in Hong Kong and We Are the Littles. He announced in 2021 that he is dating fellow group member Kayan9896.
- Kaki Sham is a member of the group. He performed in the film High Noon (Chinese: 烈日當空) in his youth and in the 2016 film Weeds on Fire. Sham received a lot of attention after becoming the host of the ViuTV show be ON game.
- Jessica Chan joined the channel after being a model and receiving a university degree in 2018. After starring in the group's short video "Godfather" (Chinese: 教父), she became a channel regular. According to Harper's Bazaar, numerous companies seek her to film commercials including the mixian chain restaurant TamJai SamGor. She starred in the second episode of the ViuTV short drama You Only Live Once.
- Kathy Ngai was selected to become a group member after the group's recruitment campaign "Channel needs girls" (Chinese: Channel需要女). According to Harper's Bazaar in October 2021, she was the female group member who appeared the most in its videos and portrayed pleasant and harmless characters. She competed in the 2021 ViuTV reality television show Miss Mask Pageant.
- Yanny Chan is a member of the disbanded girl group Super Girls. She was a star in the ViuTV television series Who Sells Bricks in Hong Kong, and Louis Koo's artist management company manages her. In Trial & Error videos, she frequently portrays "nosey women" characters (Chinese: 八婆).
- Kayan9896 had a breakout performance in the 2020 Trial & Error video "Don't tell me that she has a boyfriend (Chinese: 唔通佢有男朋友). She acted in Ian Chan's music video "DWBF" and sang "Hai Gum Sin La" with MC $oHo & KidNey.
- Ernest Poon is a member of the group. He played a blowup doll in the group's skit "No masturbation" (Chinese: 唔准打飛機).
- Jacky Tong is a member of the group. Born in Malaysia, he moved to Hong Kong when he was three years old. He starred in the 2019 ViuTV television series Limited Education as the student union president. He majored in directing at the Hong Kong Academy for Performing Arts. Before becoming an actor, he did behind-the-scenes work as a screenwriter and director. After performing in Limited Education, Tong had almost no work to do and considered becoming a monk by joining a friend who went to Taiwan to take a monk class. On learning that Trial & Error was recruiting behind-the-scenes members, he applied for a role and was selected. Tong started out as an assistant director and owing to his interest and prior experience in acting, he became an actor for the group. In Trial & Error skits, he frequently portrays dapper lovers such as Vincent in "A fairy tale without autumn" (Chinese: 沒有秋天的童話).
- Wong Tsz Ho is a former member of the group.

=== Behind-the-scenes members ===
- Leung Ho-gam (Chinese: 梁顥晉), also known as "Match Guy" (Chinese: 火柴仔), is a camera operator and an early member of the group.

== Videos ==
Trial & Error makes short videos that cost little to produce and are frequently filmed as mockumentaries. The videos include game shows, music videos, funny sketches, and parodies of popular songs and movies, through which the channel's founders share their thoughts about interactions with others, workplace politics, and what is currently in vogue. Frequently featuring slapstick and preposterous practical jokes, its videos are analogies of what it is like to be a Hong Kong resident, the channel's followers think. In their youth, the YouTube channel's members watched Stephen Chow's films, which feature mo lei tau humour. Their content is heavily influenced by Chow's work.

Released on 26 October 2020, the group's first short film was a spoof of the film Tenet. Titled "The Realistic Tenet: the full version" (Chinese: 《寫實的天能》完整版), it shows a YouTuber (played by So Chi Ho) who is no longer making money. A person played by Hui Yin invites the YouTuber to time travel back by two years to kill the instigator of the Third World War, who is played by Neo Yau. The instigator had killed someone which caused a massive string of events that needed to be put in school history lessons. Since secondary schools could not withstand the massive increase in stress, the Third World War began. Apple Daily noted that the Yau-played instigator had a mole inked on his face, which the newspaper thought alluded to Chan Tong-kai. The fight scenes between So and Yau happen on different timelines, which pays homage to similar scenes in Tenet. The film received a positive reception from netizens. One of Trial & Error's earliest videos was "Don't tell me that she has a boyfriend" (Chinese: 唔通佢有男朋友). The story was told from the perspective of an otaku who wants to date a goddess and stars Kayan9896 as the female lead. Kayan9896 is filmed from many angles from the otaku's perspective, leading to her receiving a lot of attention from netizens who called her "the Hong Kong Tzuyu".

After Trial & Error members Yau, Hui, and So played people from the future in the ViuTV television series 940920, the group made a spoof titled "140520". The 940920 actors Terrance Lau, Cecilia Choi, and Kaki Sham performed in the parody, which spoofed scenes from Beyond the Dream as well as from 940920 and its prequel Leap Day. The group spoofed the television series My Date with a Vampire in a video released 4 July 2022 titled "The vampire and I have a misunderstanding" (Chinese: 我和殭屍有個誤會). The Hong Kong Economic Times praised the parody, writing, "In addition to the high fidelity of the modeling, even the shooting skills, angles and editing of fighting scenes are all at the same level as the previous work."

Trial & Error made a television commercial for Hang Seng Bank titled "Try to be mature, try to be serious" (Chinese: 試下成熟、試下認真) starring Yau, Hui, and So. The ad aired on ViuTV on 10 May 2022 and was posted on the YouTube channels of the bank and the group. Using the multiverse concept, the commercial shows the three men travelling through the worlds of different films and Trial & Error videos to encourage viewers to do more experimentation.

== Songs ==
On 3 December 2020, the group released a parody of the Dear Jane song "You & Me" (Chinese: 哪裡只得我共你), which was renamed to "Traffic jam on Tsun Yip Street" (Chinese: 哪裡只塞駿業里), and had its lyrics rewritten in collaboration with the lyricist Leung Pak-Kin. Showing commuters on buses and minibuses, the song discusses the massive gridlock in Kwun Tong District. Angela Yuen, who had starred in the Dear Jane music video, starred again in the Trial & Error music video, and scenes in the spoof music video allude to the original's scenes. The parody became viral and received a lot of discussion.

In June 2021, Hui and So released the Cantonese song "Hai Gum Sin La", which means "see you later" in English. In its music video, which evokes the music style of the 1980s, people are celebrating at a party. Feeling desolate, a person played by So Chi Ho longs to walk away during the partying, singing, "Let me go first, that's that. Let's play again next time!" People convince So to remain but after he decides stay they do not pay attention to him. The song's enthusiasts, who were primarily young people, started saying the lyrics in place of saying "goodbye". According to the South China Morning Post's Emily Tsang, the song alludes to the "inner struggle" that people have over many Hong Kong people moving abroad. For weeks, the song topped the ranking of Cantonese songs played on Spotify.

To lampoon the musical group Mirror, which has a dozen members, Hui and So released the song "Black Mirror". In reference to the group's prevalence on Hong Kong's billboards and promotions in the MTR and on buses, the song's lyrics say, "They're here. They're here. You see them everywhere." The duo sing, "There shouldn't be only 12 handsome men in the world. There should be at least 14."

== Shows ==
At the Kowloonbay International Trade & Exhibition Centre's Star Hall, Trial & Error performed twice on October 26, 2021, in a show titled "Trial & Error's first anniversary show: the in-person version" (Chinese: 試當真一週年現場版). The venue had 3,600 seats, and to combat scalpers they sold seats using the Dutch auction methodology, which is rarely used in Hong Kong. For the first four days, tickets cost HK$10,000 (US$1,287), HK$5,000 (US$644), HK$2,000 (US$257), and HK$800 (US$103), respectively. By the 24th day, tickets would cost HK$10 (US$1), but by the fourth day, all seats had been purchased with 13 being sold on the first day, four on the second day, and 61 on the third day. The group earned HK$5,000,000 (US$643,501) in revenue from the seat purchases, analysts estimated.

Lasting for around two hours each, the shows featured skits, dancing, singing, and stand-up comedy. The actor Louis Koo, the musical groups Dear Jane and ToNick, and fellow Hong Kong YouTube channels Pomato and FHProductionHK were guests during the live show. Yau danced with the child actor Leander Lau and did a stand-up comedy set where he joked, "I care the most about the audience in the back, because the audience in the front will say I did well no matter what I say. But the audience in the back will write bad things about me on the Internet when I do something wrong." In 2022, one of the test questions for the economics section of the 2022 Hong Kong Diploma of Secondary Education (HKDSE) discussed how Trial & Error had sold tickets for their shows. The university entrance examination's multiple choice question asked test takers about the rationale for the price, having them choose between answers of "distributing" and "rationing".

== Reception ==
The South China Morning Post's Emily Tsang said Trial & Error "tapped on enthusiasm among fans for their anti-idol sarcasm and witty use of Cantonese slang". Gary Tang Kin-yat, a Hang Seng University of Hong Kong social science assistance professor, said, "They have produced some high-quality works that are excellent in plot and humour, as well as film-making techniques and use of language." Tang said that Trial & Error became popular with Hong Kong people after having invested significant time and having gone through other platforms. The psychologist Peter Chan Kin-yan said, "Their stories or parodies often use metaphors or employ a clever, self-mocking way to discuss an embarrassing topic, which ... puts people at ease. In a way, the messages in their comedies appeal to our inner fears and desires." The BBC stated, "Its videos are unique in humor, irony and metaphor, and are very popular among the younger generation." Harper's Bazaar's Ba Ze wrote, "The works of Trial & Error are funny and in line with the current values, arousing the resonance of many young people and allowing them to become popular."
