= The Way We Talk (film) =

2024 Hong Kong film by Adam Wong

- Theatrical release poster
- Traditional Chinese: 看我今天怎麼說
- Jyutping: Hon^{1} Ngo^{5} Gam^{1} Tin^{1} Zaam^{2} Mo^{1} Syut^{3}
- Directed by: Adam Wong
- Screenplay by: Adam Wong; SeeKing; Ho Hong
- Produced by: Adam Wong; Jacqueline Liu; Ho Hong
- Starring: Neo Yau; Chung Suet Ying; Marco Ng
- Cinematography: Leung Ming Kai
- Edited by: Adam Wong; Jason Yiu; 1000springs Poon Po-yan
- Music by: Day Tai
- Production company: One Cool Film Production
- Distributed by: Edko Films; One Cool Pictures
- Release dates: 12 October 2024 (BFI LFF); 20 February 2025 (Hong Kong)
- Running time: 132 minutes
- Country: Hong Kong
- Languages: Cantonese; Hong Kong Sign Language

The Way We Talk (Chinese: 看我今天怎麼說) is a 2024 Hong Kong drama film directed and co-written by Adam Wong. Produced by One Cool Film Production, it stars Neo Yau, Chung Suet Ying, and Marco Ng. The film explores the identity conflicts of a cochlear implant user (Chung) as she navigates whether to integrate with hearing people or embrace the deaf community after befriending a sign language enthusiast (Yau).

Marking his sixth feature film, Adam Wong conceived the project in 2020 after being exposed to sign languages through a short film series. Pre-production lasted a year, during which Wong cast both previous collaborators and deaf actors, including Marco Ng in his acting debut, and the characters primarily communicate using Hong Kong Sign Language in the film. Principal photography took place in 2023, with post-production completed the same year. The film features the theme song "What If", with lyrics written by lead actress Chung and performed by Panther Chan.

The film had its world premiere at the 68th BFI London Film Festival on 12 October 2024, followed by a theatrical release in Hong Kong on 20 February 2025. It received seven nominations in the 43rd Hong Kong Film Awards, and Chung Suet Ying won Best Leading Actress in the 61st Golden Horse Awards for her role.

== Plot ==
Recently graduated from university with an actuarial science degree, Sophie becomes the ambassador for an awareness campaign on cochlear implants alongside a young designer Alan. Sophie, who is deaf due to a fever in childhood, underwent the cochlear implant surgery at age ten under her mother's pressure to fit in with hearing people and distinguish herself from the deaf community. During a campaign speech, Sophie mentions how the implant helps her feel "normal". This triggers Wolf, a volunteer and Alan's childhood friend, who is a sign language user and sees himself as equal to hearing individuals. Angrily, he disrupts her speech, signs "I am proud to be deaf", and storms off. After the event, Alan reunites with Wolf, who apologizes for leaving early. Knowing Wolf works as a car washer to save money for opening a diving school, Alan offers to help him design promotional materials and develop his brand. Initially hesitant about exploiting his deaf identity, Wolf eventually accepts Alan's insistence. While designing their logo, Alan shows Wolf a video of Sophie apologizing to him. Although she doesn't know sign language, she tries to communicate her apology using basic signs and changes Wolf's impression on her. One day, while leaving work, Alan and Sophie find Wolf accused of stealing a phone at the carpark. Sophie helps resolve the situation by assisting the accuser in finding his lost phone. Grateful, Wolf offers to teach Sophie sign language, encouraged by Alan.

Sophie soon passes an interview for a managerial assistant position at an insurance company, aiming to become an actuary. However, she realizes she was hired mainly to improve the company's image as a DEI employer. With little actual work to do, she struggles to connect with her colleagues. Despite this, she meets up with Wolf and Alan after work to learn sign language, asking Wolf to teach her the terminology of the insurance and finance industries. Sophie becomes amazed by the experience of using signs. As they bond, she joins them and their deaf friends to hang out, discovering Wolf's passion for diving and his goal to become a diving coach. While learning sign language from Wolf one day, Sophie removes her cochlear implant transmitter, only to hear muffled voices. Initially thinking it's a transmitter issue, she later learns from her audiologist that her implant has malfunctioned and requires surgery for replacement. Hesitant about the surgery, she faces Alan's confrontation, who questions whether Wolf's influence affects her decision. Sophie explains that while she tries to live like a "normal" person, she feels exhausted and reduced to a mascot by her company, only beginning to express herself truly through sign language. Sophie's mother discovers a notebook recording sign language gestures from Wolf and Alan and scolds her for straying from their goal of distinction from the deaf community, to which Sophie angrily asserts her identity as deaf. Meanwhile, Wolf learns that the diving school won't examine him due to a lack of sign language interpreters with diving knowledge. He feels his dreams are shattered and is devastated. Sophie, who has a fear of water, seeks him out at their beach and attempts to motivate him by walking into the sea to demonstrate how to overcome fears, but she nearly drowns.

Hospitalized, Sophie apologizes to her mother for the worry, and they reconcile. She quits her job and becomes a sign language interpreter at a special education school, finding joy in her work, while Wolf decides to go to the United States to pursue his diving coach exam, encouraged by Sophie.

== Cast ==
- Neo Yau as Wolf Yip, a deaf aspiring diving coach and childhood friend of Alan who prefers sign language for communication
  - Nathan Cheng as young Wolf
- Chung Suet Ying as Sophie Fong, a deaf actuarial science graduate and ambassador for cochlear implant awareness who underwent the implant surgery at a young age
- Marco Ng as Alan Ng, a deaf designer and childhood friend of Wolf who becomes Sophie's fellow ambassador for cochlear implants
  - Jesse Wong as young Alan

In addition, Yam Yuen appears as Sophie's mother, while singer Panther Chan makes a cameo appearance as herself.

== Production ==
=== Development ===
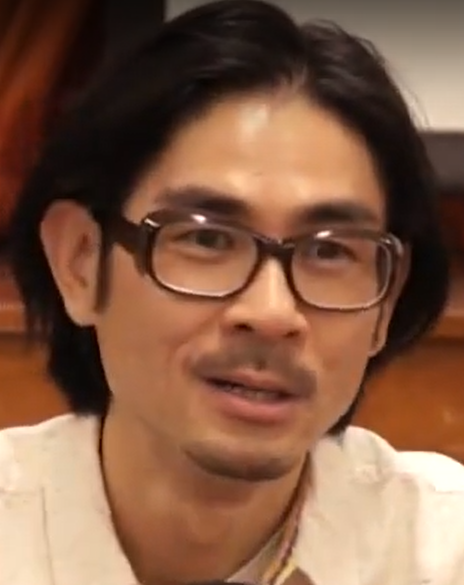
Director and screenwriter Adam Wong

In early 2020, director and screenwriter Adam Wong conceived the film during a meal with screenwriter SeeKing, where they discussed a short film series created by producer Ho Hong about deaf people signing underwater, sparking Wong's interest in producing a film about them. Wong began field research, referencing the memoir My Deaf Friends and the American documentary Sound and Fury (2000). He interviewed otorhinolaryngologists and audiologists to understand the mechanisms and limitations of cochlear implants, and he spoke to over 50 deaf individuals, social workers, and scholars to learn about deaf culture. In September 2020, the film was included in the Golden Horse Project Promotion under the working title 85 Decibel, marking Wong's sixth feature film. He chose this title because it represented the medical threshold for hearing loss. After learning about Wong's plans to produce a film on deaf culture, Chung Suet Ying messaged him to express her gratitude for addressing the topic, as she had learned sign language for family reasons and previously hosted an RTHK program about the deaf community, making her familiar with the issues. Following their discussion, Wong decided to cast Chung after watching her performance on set in his previous film The Way We Keep Dancing (2021), when he was researching for 85 Decibel, as he found Chung to be a suitable choice due to her knowledge of the deaf community and her acting potential. He noted that Chung's sign language skills were actually better than her character's, which required her to sign "worse" to convey the sense of being a beginner.

After a year of pre-production, a deaf friend of Wong suggested that he'd include real deaf people in the project. Wong agreed and decided to cast one of the three protagonists with a deaf actor. Marco Ng, who had been deaf since the age of two due to a genetic mutation, was recommended for the role by his secondary school teacher after he won Mister Deaf World in 2023. Ng accepted the offer after learning that the film focused on the deaf community and culture. Since Ng's hearing condition was worsened gradually, he retained some hearing in childhood, allowing him to communicate using spoken language and deliver his lines without assistance. However, due to his hearing deficit, he struggled to hear his co-stars' lines while filming in noisy environments and had to rely on instinct to perform. The film marked Ng's acting debut, but he expressed no interest in pursuing acting further. To prepare for his role, Ng took acting classes from actress Yam Yuen (who also played Sophie's mother in the film) for three months.

In May 2022, Wong approached Neo Yau for the final protagonist role, and Yau received the screenplay in August 2022 while pre-producing the action film Little Fighters (2025) with his production company Trial & Error. He put aside his producer work to take on the role, citing reasons related to his passion in acting. Wong cast Yau, who was the lead actor in another of his films, She Remembers, He Forgets (2015), believing Yau's characteristics and enthusiasm as an actor would help him to pass the sign language training. To prepare for his role, Yau underwent two years of sign language training with interpreters Seabird and Kimberly Wu, starting during the COVID-19 pandemic. Since Yau's character was profoundly deaf, Seabird taught him natural sign languages, which did not follow the logic of spoken languages, strengthening his character's authenticity. Wong chose sign language as a primary language for the film and entrusted its execution to sign language instructors, comparing it to how action films relied on fight choreographers for action scenes. Due to the lack of direct translations between Cantonese and sign languages, Wu explained that metaphors could not be utilized in the sign language dialogues, necessitating adjustments to some word choices in the screenplay using synonyms. Wong aimed to incorporate deaf individuals in the film and reached out to The Hong Kong Society for the Deaf, dedicating two days to auditioning interested candidates.

=== Filming and post-production ===
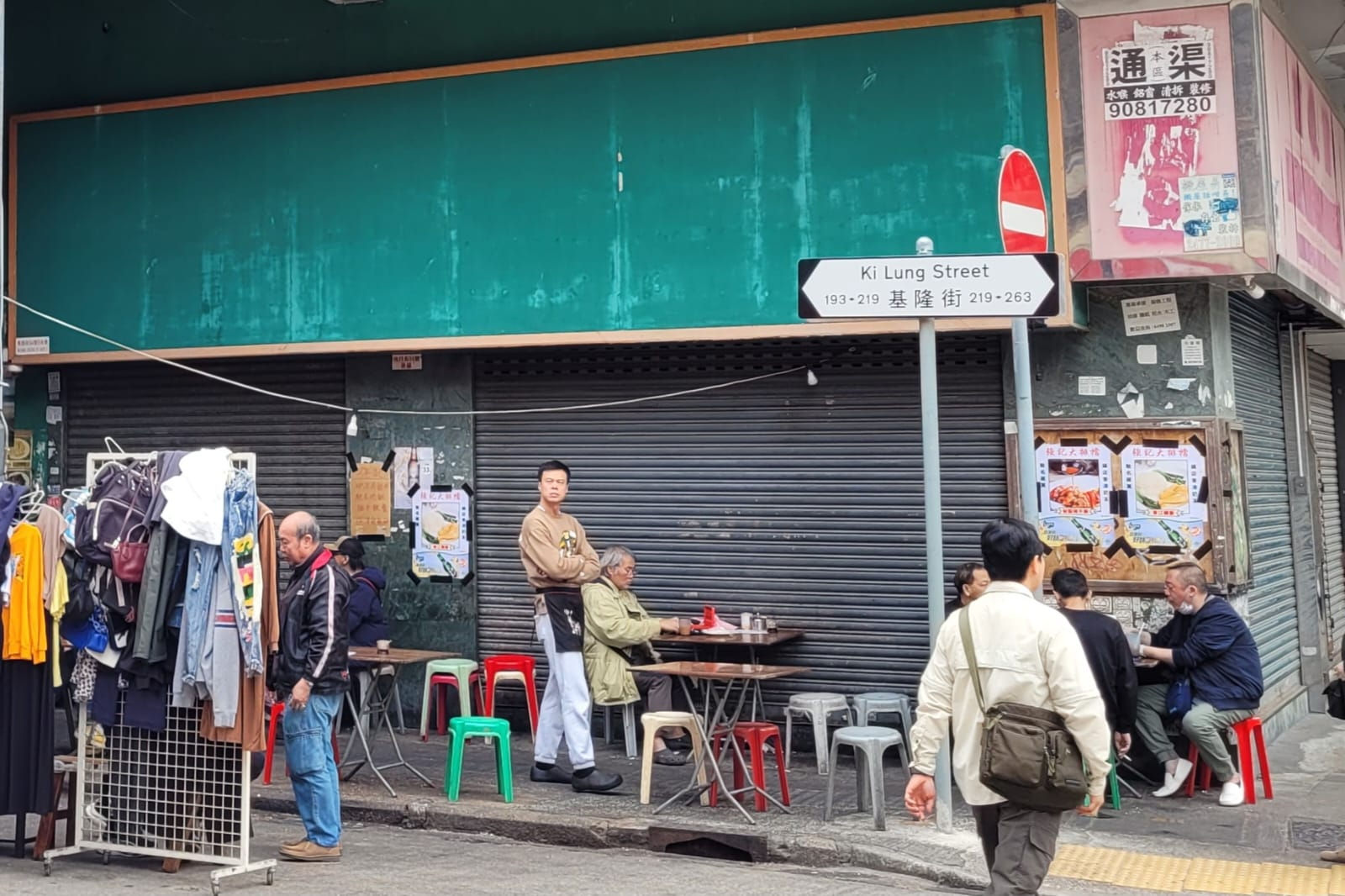
The sign language lesson scenes were filmed at Keung Kee Dai Pai Dong in Sham Shui Po.

Principal photography took place in 2023, with Leung Ming Kai acting as the cinematographer. Adam Wong noted that he took a more casual approach to location scouting compared to his previous feature The Way We Keep Dancing, which focuses on the themes of real estate hegemony and requires specific filming locations to present the phenomenon, while The Way We Talk addresses a more universal theme and he did not want it to be overshadowed by prominent landmarks. Wong chose to film several scenes at dai pai dongs, as he was fond of their local character and found the noisy environment provides a stark contrast to the experiences of deaf people. He decided to shoot scenes with Wolf (played by Neo Yau) at Keung Kee Dai Pai Dong on Ki Lung Street in Sham Shui Po, and scenes with Alan (played by Marco Ng) at Tak Yu Restaurant on Star Street in Wan Chai, to reflect the two characters' backgrounds. Although Wong considered filming Alan's scenes in Tai Hang, he ultimately chose the Starstreet Precinct because he believed its sense of decay was more cinematic. Filming also took place at Wong Chuk Street and Fuk Wing Street in Shum Shui Po.

Wong also selected a beach as another main setting for the film, finding it relatively quiet and suitable as a private space for the protagonists. He initially considered filming in Changsha, Hunan, but deemed it unrealistic for the Hongkonger protagonists to suddenly go there within the screenplay's context, and he ultimately decided to shoot the scene in Hong Kong, despite the nearby mansions appearing in the frame. Post-production lasted three months and concluded in late 2023. In March 2024, One Cool Pictures presented the film at the Hong Kong Filmart, during the 48th Hong Kong International Film Festival, where it won the CCG Grand Award. In October, the film was also presented in the market screenings at the 29th Busan International Film Festival.

=== Music ===
The Way We Talk was scored by composer Day Tai. It features the theme song "What If", which Tai composed and produced, with lyrics written by lead actress Chung Suet Ying and performed by Panther Chan. A music video for the theme song was released prior to the film's release, produced by Adam Wong and Chung Chi-fai. The video depicts various daily life scenarios where sign language is used for communication by a group of 72 sign language users, both deaf and hearing, including Panther Chan, who learned sign language specifically for the project, along with scenes of deaf dancers Heidi Wong and Yuen Ning-chun performing dances in sign.

== Release ==
The Way We Talk had its world premiere at the 68th BFI London Film Festival on 12 October 2024, followed by screenings at the 21st Hong Kong Asian Film Festival and the 2024 Golden Horse Film Festival. The film held 12 early screenings in December 2024, and received its theatrical release in Hong Kong on 20 February 2025. It was also screened in competition at the 20th Osaka Asian Film Festival, and at the 27th Far East Film Festival.

The film is also selected at the 24th New York Asian Film Festival to be held from July 11 to July 27, 2025 for its North American Premiere.

== Reception ==
=== Box office ===
The Way We Talk debuted as the box office champion on its opening day. But due to the Chinese animated film Ne Zha 2 pushing ahead for an earlier release and receiving most of the screening times in Hong Kong cinemas, it only received one fourth of the screenings compared to Ne Zha 2 and grossed approximately HK$2.5 million in its opening weekend, ranking second in the weekly box office. It reached HK$8.5 million by the third week, and accumulated over HK$9 million by the fourth week.

=== Critical response ===
Edmund Lee of the South China Morning Post gave The Way We Talk 4.5/5 stars, calling it Adam Wong's "best film yet" and praising its "immersive sense of soul-searching" while acknowledging its exploration of identity and the complexities of deaf culture through the experiences of its young characters. Siu Yu of am730 also named the film "the best of Adam Wong's", acknowledging his commendable balance between heartfelt themes and controversial social issues, particularly the tension between cochlear implants and sign language in the deaf community, as well as the award-worthy performance of lead actress Chung Suet Ying.

Ho Tak of Harper's Bazaar called the film "the best Hong Kong film of the year", commending Adam Wong's screenplay and thorough research on social issues concerning the deaf community, particularly the "well-developed" and "emotionally resonant" characters that include both sign language users and cochlear implant recipients, which effectively balance and express the viewpoints of both groups without favoring either side through the strong performances and chemistry among the three lead actors. Keith Ho, writing for HK01, complimented the film as "masterfully crafted", immersing viewers in the world of sign language with its strong screenplay, excellent sound design, and authentic portrayal of deaf culture, and viewing it as a significant work in Hong Kong cinema with the potential to reach a broader international audience and provoke reflection on identity and communication.

== Awards and nominations ==
Year	Award	Category	Nominee	Result	Ref.
2024	61st Golden Horse Awards	Best Leading Actor	Neo Yau	Nominated	
2024	61st Golden Horse Awards	Best Leading Actress	Chung Suet Ying	Won	
2024	61st Golden Horse Awards	Best Sound Effects	Cyrus Tang, Mandy Kwan	Nominated	
2025	31st Hong Kong Film Critics Society Awards	Best Director	Adam Wong	Nominated	
2025	31st Hong Kong Film Critics Society Awards	Best Actor	Neo Yau	Nominated	
2025	31st Hong Kong Film Critics Society Awards	Best Actress	Chung Suet Ying	Nominated	
2025	31st Hong Kong Film Critics Society Awards	Film of Merit	—N/a	Won	
2025	43rd Hong Kong Film Awards	Best Film	—N/a	Nominated	
2025	43rd Hong Kong Film Awards	Best Director	Adam Wong	Nominated	
2025	43rd Hong Kong Film Awards	Best Actor	Neo Yau	Nominated	
2025	43rd Hong Kong Film Awards	Best Actress	Chung Suet Ying	Nominated	
2025	43rd Hong Kong Film Awards	Best New Performer	Marco Ng	Nominated	
2025	43rd Hong Kong Film Awards	Best Sound Design	Cyrus Tang, Mandy Kwan	Nominated	
2025	43rd Hong Kong Film Awards	Best Original Film Song	"What If"	Nominated	
2025	27th Far East Film Festival	Golden Mulberry	—N/a	Nominated	
2025	24th New York Asian Film Festival	Audience Award	—N/a	Won	
