= Jessica Chan =

Hong Kong actress (born 1995/1996)

- 陳苡臻
- Born: Chan Yee-chun; 1995 or 1996 (age 29–30); Hong Kong
- Education: City University of Hong Kong (BBA)
- Occupation: Actress
- Years active: 2020–present

Jessica Chan Yee-chun (Chinese: 陳苡臻; born 1995/1996) is a Hong Kong actress and a member of YouTube sketch comedy group Trial & Error.

== Early life and education ==
Chan was born in 1995 or 1996. She was fond of being an actress while growing up. Chan later attended City University of Hong Kong to study finance and graduated with a Bachelor of Business Administration in 2018. She featured in several short films and music videos during university years, and worked in the public relations industry for two years after graduation.

== Career ==
In 2020, she was approached by Neo Yau, the founder of Trial & Error, who was impressed by her performance after watching her music videos. Chan quitted her job and joined Trial & Error to pursue an acting career in the same year. She was one of the regular members of the comedy skits group and received public attention after filming short films Beyblade Christmas Eve (爆旋平安夜) and Godfather (教父).

In 2021, Chan received her first onscreen role in the ViuTV drama series You Only Live Once. She was also featured in singer Gareth T.'s new single, "Love In The Snow" (雪不完的浪漫), in the same year. She voiced the titular character in the Cantonese dub version of 2022 Japanese animated film Pompo: The Cinéphile, and appeared in the 2023 drama film Time Still Turns the Pages. In 2024, she had leading roles in the Chinese-Canadian comedy film Fresh Off Markham, and Hong Kong horror film Haunting Call. Chan is set to star in another leading role in the upcoming drama film Good Game.

== Personal life ==
As of January 2024, Chan is dating actor and founder of Trial & Error Neo Yau. The couple confirmed their relationship in April 2022.

== Filmography ==
=== Film ===
Year	Title	Role	Notes/Ref.
2022	Pompo: The Cinéphile	Pompo	Cantonese voice dub
2023	Back Home	Actress	
2023	Time Still Turns the Pages	Miss Chan	
2024	Fresh Off Markham	Circle Tam (譚圓圓)	
2024	Haunting Call	Siu Nga (小雅)	
TBA	Good Game †	TBA	

=== Television ===
Year	Title	Role	Notes/Ref.
2020	You Only Live Once	Jessica	Main role
