= Pompo =

Pompo may refer to:

- an Oscan praenomen (personal name)
- the name of the father and a son of Numa Pompilius (753–673 BC), second king of Rome
- Algernon Heneage (1833–1915), Royal Navy admiral nicknamed "Pompo"
- Alfonso "Pompo" Aguado, a founder of the Venezuelan band Guaco
- Pompo: The Cinéphile, a Japanese manga series
