= Ten Years (2015 film) =

2015 Hong Kong anthology film

- Film poster
- Chinese: 十年
- Directed by: Kwok Zune; Wong Fei-pang; Jevons Au; Kiwi Chow; Ng Ka-leung
- Written by: Kiwi Chow; Ng Ka-leung; Jevons Au; Wong Fei-pang; Fean Chung Chu-fung; Ho Fung-lun
- Produced by: Ng Ka-leung; Mandrew Kwan; Jevons Au; Frankie Chan; Andrew Choi
- Starring: Peter Chan; Wong Ching; Lau Ho-Chi; Kin-Ping Leung; Liu Kai-chi; Ng Siu-hin
- Cinematography: Rick Lau Tsz-kin; Benny Chan Ka-shun; Ho Chiu-yuen; Ng Ka-yin
- Edited by: Wong Fei-pang; Ng Ka-leung; Kwok Zune; Kiwi Chow; Gipsy Chang Yuk-mui; Samuel Chan Ka-hin
- Music by: Chun Hor; Herman Ho-man Yip; Daisuke Kashiwa; Chill Yang
- Production companies: Ten Years Studio; 109G Studio; Four Parts Production
- Distributed by: Golden Scene Co. Ltd.
- Release date: 17 December 2015 (Hong Kong)
- Running time: 104 minutes
- Country: Hong Kong
- Language: Cantonese
- Budget: HK$600,000
- Box office: HK$6 million

Ten Years
- Chinese: 十年
- Literal meaning: Ten Years
Transcriptions
Standard Mandarin
- Hanyu Pinyin: Shí nián
Yue: Cantonese
- Yale Romanization: Sahp nìhn
- Jyutping: Sap6 Nin4

Ten Years (Chinese: 十年) is a 2015 Hong Kong speculative fiction anthology film, featuring a vision of the semi-autonomous territory in the year 2025, with human rights and freedoms gradually diminishing as the Chinese government exerts increasing influence there. Produced on a shoestring budget, the film was a surprise hit, beating Star Wars: The Force Awakens at the Yau Ma Tei cinema where it was first released. It was released on Netflix in February 2019.

Due to the film's sensitive political themes, mainland Chinese authorities censored reports mentioning Ten Years except in terms of condemnation. State television channels and major internet sites were prohibited from broadcasting the 35th Hong Kong Film Awards live as the film was nominated for Best Film, which it eventually won.

== Plot ==
The film comprises five short stories set in or before the year 2025.

=== Extras ===
Prior to an International Labour Day celebration in 2020, government officials concoct a false flag assassination plot to foment public support for legislation of the National Security Law. They hire two petty gangsters to execute the plot: Hairy (Zerisawa Courtney Wu), a middle-aged low-level triad member, and Peter (Peter Chan), an immigrant from India. While the two argue over who should fire the gun, the director of the Liaison Office decides that the leaders of both the TMD and the Fortune Parties are to get shot with real bullets, so as to instigate greater panic in the territory. Misbelieving they will get paid and flee to India afterwards, both Hairy and Peter attempt the assassination but are killed instantly on scene by the police. Later, the government identifies the perpetrators as terrorists and restates the significance of the upcoming legislation.

Director Kwok Zune stated that the triad-like behaviour of the officials was inspired by real-world pro-establishment groups in Hong Kong, who were accused of beating and sexually assaulting pro-democratic protesters during the 2014 Hong Kong protests.

=== Season of the End ===
Wong Ching (herself) and Lau Ho-chi (himself) attempt to preserve objects from homes destroyed by bulldozers. The last specimen Lau wants to create is his own body.

=== Dialect ===
As the government enacts laws limiting operating areas of non-Mandarin-speaking taxi drivers, a Cantonese-speaking driver (Leung Kin-ping) finds himself marginalised as he fails to pass the national Mandarin proficiency test. The driver's wife instructs him to stop using Cantonese with their son, Kongson, so that the boy will do better at his Mandarin medium of instruction school. A series of vignettes further illustrate the increasing dominance of Mandarin and Leung's struggle adjusting. He is unable to make himself understood by his Mandarin GPS unit and is ridiculed by a passenger for it. Two Mandarin-speaking fares opt to take another cab when they realise he cannot speak the language. One of his passengers, an office lady (Catherine Chau), is fired from her job for failing to clearly explain something to a client in Mandarin.

The film alludes to a 2003 real-world proposal by the Transport Department that failed, as well as a regulation introduced in Wuhan. In Mainland China, Mandarin (a.k.a. Putonghua) is promoted as a national language, and legislation such as the Guangdong National Language Regulations restricts the use of Cantonese and all other varieties of Chinese. The name Dialect comes from the fact that the Mainland government refers to Cantonese as a dialect despite the fact that it is mutually unintelligible with Mandarin. The short was directed by Jevons Au Man-kit, a graduate of the Hong Kong Academy for Performing Arts, who said that the taxi driver's plight was influenced by his own struggles to write scripts in Mandarin in an increasingly Mainland-oriented Hong Kong film sector.

=== Self-immolator ===
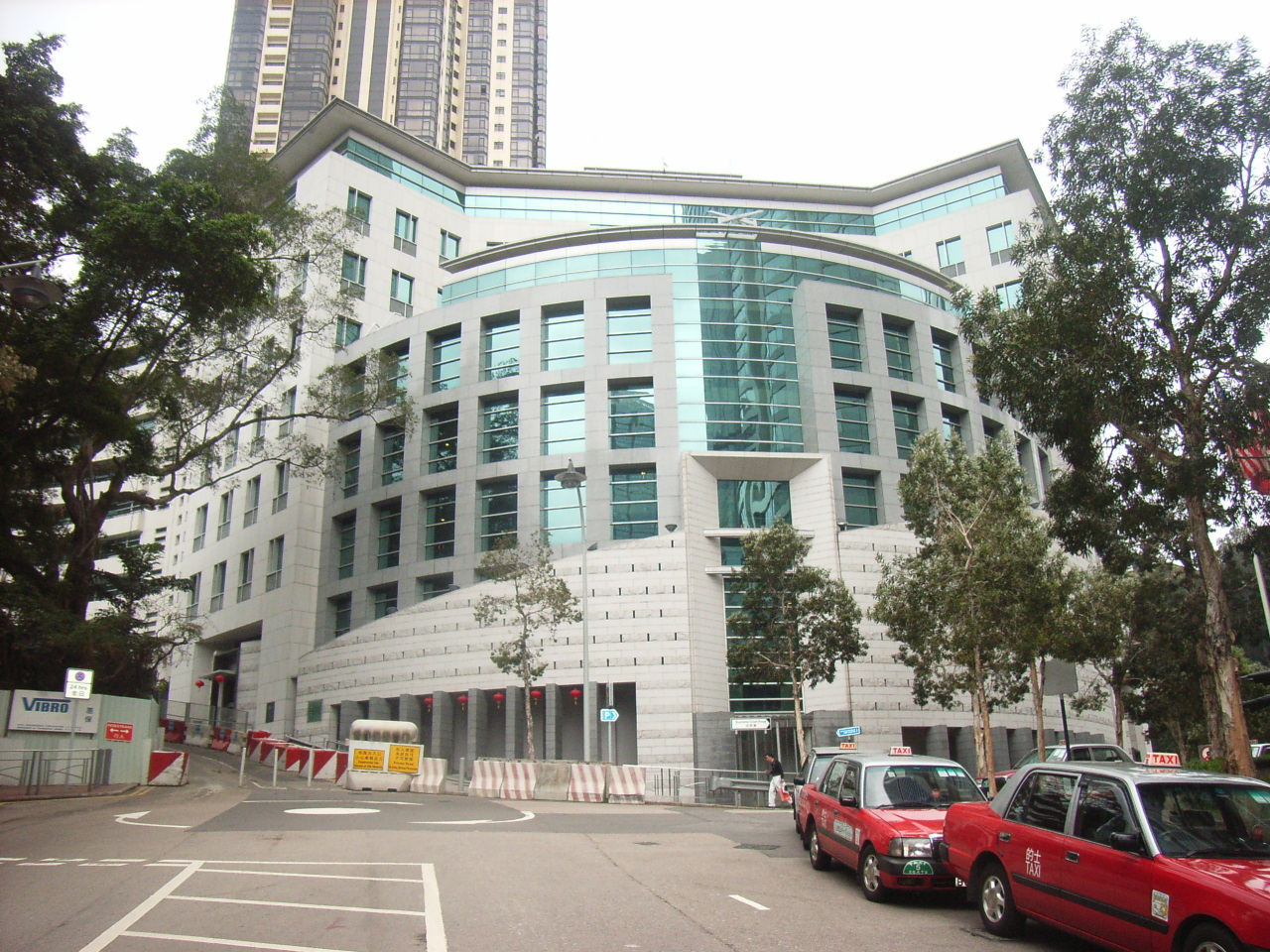
The British Consulate-General, location of the eponymous self-immolation

Au-yeung Kin-fung (Ng Siu-hin), a young hardline supporter for Hong Kong independence, becomes the first to be convicted under the National Security Law and dies during a hunger strike in prison. An unknown person commits self-immolation in front of the British Consulate-General in Admiralty. This escalates public concerns about Hong Kong's undecided future beyond 2047. Au-yeung's friend Karen (Tanzela Qoser) is initially feared to be the self-immolator but is later revealed to have been kidnapped by secret police. Au-yeung's allies, led by Marco (Neo Yau), break into and set fire to the Central Government Liaison Office in Sai Wan, while a group of Christians gather and pray outside the British Consulate-General to urge the Britons to uphold the Sino-British Joint Declaration co-signed with the Beijing authorities. The Communist Party labels the demand for independence a diplomatic affair, thereby justifying the deployment of the People's Liberation Army in the city. The protests in Sai Wan and Admiralty are crushed violently. As a flashback reveals, after witnessing Au-yeung being severely beaten by police, an old woman was moved to commit self-immolation outside the British Consulate-General. The film ends on a prolonged shot of her umbrella burning, alluding to the Umbrella Movement.

The storytelling is intertwined with interviews with commentators analysing ongoing events and providing background information such as Hong Kong's removal from the UN decolonisation list in 1972 at China's behest.

Directed by Kiwi Chow, Self-immolator alludes to the common practice of self-immolation in mainland China as a form of protest, particularly among Tibetans. Chow stated that while the plot of this piece may seem extreme, "In 2004, people would also find it hard to believe that [the police can drag a protester into a dark corner and beat him up]", alluding to the beating of Ken Tsang and other incidents of police brutality during the 2014 Hong Kong protests.

=== Local Egg ===
Sam (Liu Kai-chi), a grocery store keeper, is told about the closure of the last chicken farm in Hong Kong. He then visits his egg supplier, farm owner Cheung who recalls the government's actions to gradually kill off the industry despite the fact that he has been meeting their demands. Sam's store is frequently checked by Youth Guards, members of a Red Guards-like uniform group, since his use of "local eggs" on his label is on the censor list. He questions why "local eggs" must be relabeled "Hong Kong eggs" when they refer to the same thing. Sam finds his son Ming among a squad of Youth Guards throwing eggs at a bookstore, but Ming assures his father that he has kept his teaching in mind and has not participated in the vandalism; instead, he often leaks the censor lists and actions to bookstore keepers so that they can remain safe and preserve the books. Relaxed at his son's critical thinking, Sam reminds a bookstore keeper not to get used to such suppressive acts.

== Production ==
The independent film was conceived by Ng Ka-leung, a graduate of the Hong Kong Polytechnic University. Ng said that the idea predated the Umbrella Movement, and was inspired by ongoing political, educational and housing problems. He explained in late 2015:

I had the idea for Ten Years early last year. I had been feeling dejected for years about the lack of future for Hong Kong. The national education controversy showed that the next generation are at risk of ideological indoctrination. Political, education and housing problems have festered for years and all protest movements have turned out to be futile in the end. I wanted to make a film to flesh out possible future scenarios so people might be goaded into thinking more about the future path Hong Kong should take.

The film was produced on a budget of HK$500,000 (US$64,000). The cast and crew were mainly volunteers. It was filmed in Hong Kong.

== Release ==
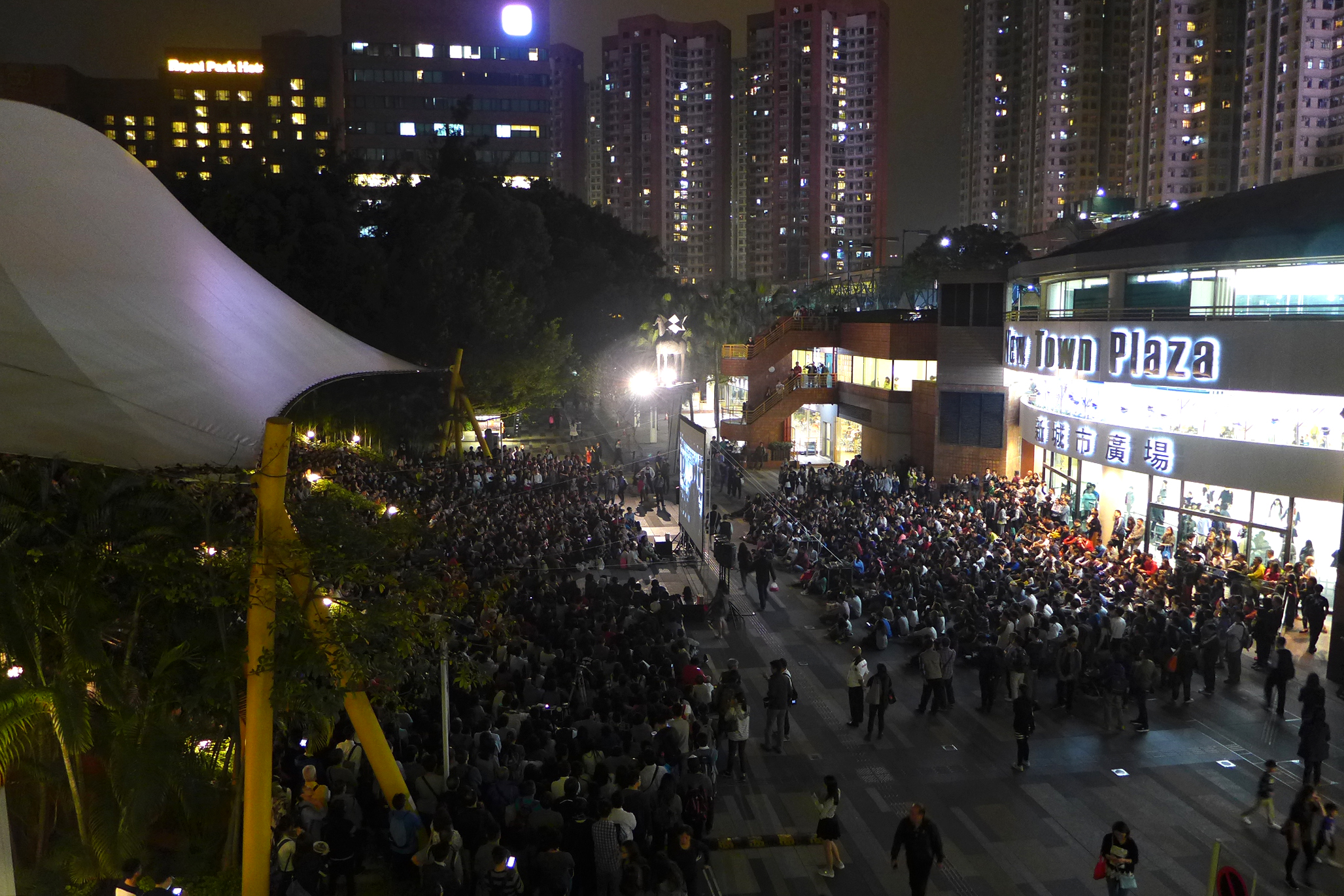
A community screening of Ten Years on 1 April 2016 in front of Sha Tin Town Hall

The film was featured at the Hong Kong Asian Film Festival in November 2015 before its general release. It was initially released on only one screen in Hong Kong at the Broadway Cinematheque in Yau Ma Tei at the end of 2015. It was a surprise hit, and subsequently received a release at select UA Cinemas. It was further picked up by two independent cinemas, the Metroplex in Kowloon Bay and the Ma On Shan Classics Cinema. The Metroplex decided to show the film in its largest cinema (430 seats) boosting ticket sales.

By early February 2016, only the independent cinema in Ma On Shan was showing the film. It ended its run there following the weekend of 12 February. Since being pulled from theatres, the film has been showing at private screening at universities and other rented venues, advertised on social media.

In February 2016, the international distribution rights for the film were purchased by Golden Scene, a Hong Kong-based distributor.

On 1 April 2016, with no cinemas screening the film despite high demand, Ten Years was simultaneously screened at 34 different public locations around Hong Kong, including the underside of motorway flyovers (in Sham Shui Po and Mei Foo), the public steps leading to the Sha Tin Town Hall, and the forecourt of the Legislative Council Complex. The screenings were organised by a variety of community groups, educational institutions, and churches. They were attended by thousands, many of whom were frustrated to have been unable to get tickets before the film was pulled from cinemas.

In 2019, the film was made available globally via Netflix. The film was removed from Netflix in 2021 and is no longer available on the streaming service.

== Reception ==
=== Box office ===
In the first month of its general release, most showings were sold out. At the only cinema showing it in the week of its opening, it grossed more ticket sales than Star Wars: The Force Awakens, and ranked top ten in Hong Kong's weekend box office. At the end of January 2016 the film surpassed HK$5 million in box office earnings, which one of the directors called a miracle given the film's modest budget and limited screening. At the time the film was only being shown at UA Megabox, the Metroplex and the Ma On Shan Classics Cinema. By mid-February, when Ten Years ended its run at the sole screen where it was still being shown, the film had grossed more than HK$6 million.

The South China Morning Post reported that "Ten Years" topped the charts on Chinese download site zimuzu.tv after the Hong Kong Film Awards ceremony, but that users were disappointed to find they had downloaded the 2011 American film of the same name.

=== Critical response ===
Ten Years received generally positive reviews locally. Some viewers reportedly left the cinema in tears. Time Out Hong Kong called the film "powerful, poignant, relevant and brave", as well as "nightmarish". The Hong Kong Economic Journal called it "well-constructed", and wrote: "Viewers will realize that although some of the scenes may seem unfamiliar and others way too radical, the stories are always anchored on developments in the past and the present. There’s always something in the movie that viewers can identify with, something believable and within the realm of the possible." Writing in the South China Morning Post, Edmund Lee called the film "a reminder of the power of independent, intelligent filmmaking as a vehicle for social and political critique" and "one of the most thought-provoking local films in years". Alice Wu said: "Provocation is an art form. Perhaps the true value of Ten Years lies in how uncomfortable it is to us all... As a portrayal of our worst fears, it is arguably the quintessential political horror film of our time. It perfectly plays (or should it be 'preys'?) on many Hongkongers' primal fears..."

A review in Hong Kong Free Press responded that

while Global Times and other reviewers have primarily directed their critiques at the likelihood of the film's events actually taking place, the film cannot be entirely interpreted as a prediction for the year 2025. Ten Years is not a forecast calculated via econometric modelling; it is simply a portrayal of the Hong Kong public's worst fears. Perhaps a more pertinent question raised by the film is why people have come to dread – rather than look forward to – the city’s future. The answer is probably because we have been shown no realistic alternative.

The same reviewer observed a message about belonging in Hong Kong: "For example, Extras and Self-Immolator [...] portray mainland immigrants, South Asians and elderly characters without treating them as antagonists or resorting to stereotypes. The latter film even features a mixed-race relationship, advocating the idea that Hong Kong identity should be based on civic, not ethnic, factors."

The film was selected to be screened at the 18th Taipei Film Festival opening on 30 June 2016.

=== Industry voices ===
Peter Lam, chairman of Media Asia and of the Hong Kong Tourism Board, said: "The fact that the film got the prize is a tragedy for Hong Kong's movie industry [because] politics has kidnapped the profession and politicised film-awarding events." Lam added that, from a film investor's perspective: "The movie did not possess the qualities of best film, as you can see that it was not nominated for best actress or best actor awards, nor was it a blockbuster." Crucindo Hung, former chairman of the Federation of Motion Film Producers of Hong Kong, criticised the award as "an out-of-your-mind and outrageous decision." Lam defended his remark from criticism, but earned further rebuke to his statement by implying that a wonton noodles shop never ought to be voted best restaurant in Hong Kong. Some members of the Chamber of Films said they would submit a proposal to the Hong Kong Film Awards Association to change the voting mechanism of the awards. Daniel Lam, Chamber of Films member and owner of Universe Films, whose film Little Big Master lost to Ten Years, said that current voting mechanism "can be easily manipulated to produce an irrational result".

=== Political response ===
On the other hand, the Chinese Communist Party-controlled Global Times called the film absurd and ridiculous, and accused the filmmakers of trying to spread anxiety. It referred to the film's political message as a "virus of the mind" and claimed its box office earnings were minimal.

Due to the fact that the film was nominated for best picture in the 35th Hong Kong Film Awards, the state-owned China Central Television announced that it would not live telecast the ceremony, as it had done every year since 1991. The online video website Tencent has said that it will also not cover the event. China's leading film review websites Douban and Mtime.com do not allow users to create a page for the film. Derek Yee, chairman of Hong Kong Film Awards, who presented the award to the directors, said that it had been hard to find anyone else to present the award, due to fears of being blacklisted for mainland opportunities.

Major mainland news websites, including Sina and Tencent, covered the awards ceremony, held 3 April 2016, but did not mention the winner of best picture, considered one of Asia's top film awards. In mainland Chinese cities where TVB, the main Hong Kong television channel, is aired, users on social media reported that the programme was blacked out and replaced with a cooking programme.

During the week of 11 April 2016, Apple was ordered by the Chinese State Administration of Press, Publication, Radio, Film and Television to shut down its iTunes Movie and iBooks stores, which had been approved approximately six months earlier. This appears to be in response to the availability of Ten Years in the iTunes Movie store. News of the store closures broke shortly before the movie became available on iTunes in Hong Kong.

=== Accolades ===
Awards and nominations
| Association | Category | Nominee(s) | Result | Ref. |
|---|---|---|---|---|
| 22nd Hong Kong Film Critics Society Award | Film of Merit | Ten Years | Won | |
| 35th Hong Kong Film Awards | Best Film | Ten Years | Won | |

== Legacy ==
The film remains a subject of discussion in the Hong Kong society as concerns of diminishing civil rights in the city grew. Commentators said the plots became reality as time passes on. At the start of the pro-democracy movement in 2019, Leung Ling-kit, who demanded the resignation of Chief Executive Carrie Lam, fell to his death in Admiralty. Director of Self-immolator Kiwi Chow said part of the plot in his film had become reality. A year later, Beijing imposed a national security law in Hong Kong to crush the demonstrations and "stop the chaos", coinciding with the events imagined in Extras. The Hong Kong legislature passed another security ordinance in 2024.

== Franchise ==
In October 2017, a pan-Asian franchise based on the film was announced. Producer Andrew Choi stated that he hoped to make it a cross-regional exchange platform to collectively reflect on and discuss 'our future.' Japanese, Taiwanese and Thai versions were planned, each offering a very specific take on those societies' "hidden dangers and hidden fears", according to Rina B. Tsou, one of five Taiwanese directors on that project. For instance, the Japanese version would explore a country "plagued by pollution and aging" as well as a "society where morality and personal history are manipulated by technology." "Surveillance and government control" in a Thailand a decade hence will be envisaged by director Aditya Assarat, while the Taiwanese project foretells an island where "immigrant workers are systematically exploited and the loss of culture and dropping birth rate" have caused its inhabitants to turn to "virtual reality escapes."

Executive producers for the franchise include Andrew Choi, one of the original Hong Kong 'Ten Years' producers, and Japanese filmmaker Hirokazu Kore-eda. Films released in 2018 were titled Ten Years Japan (Jû-nen), Ten Years Taiwan, and Ten Years Thailand, respectively. Ten Years Myanmar was released in 2023.

== See also ==
- Hong Kong Will Be Destroyed After 33 Years – a 2014 short film with similar themes
- List of TV and films with critiques of Chinese Communist Party
