= Neo Yau =

Hong Kong actor (born 1990)

- 游學修
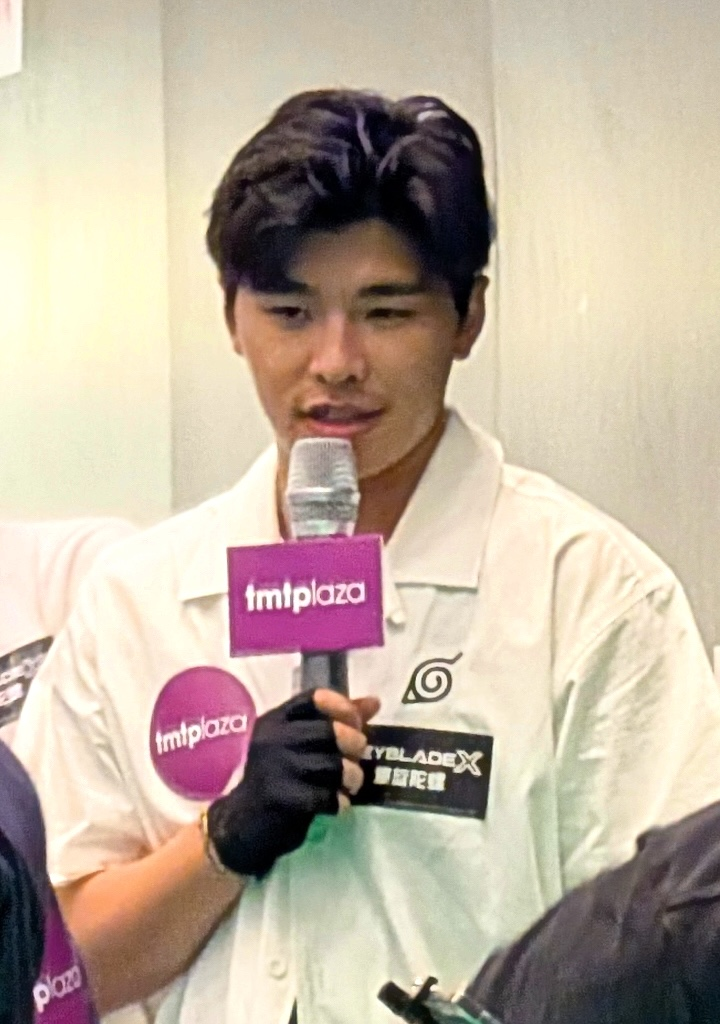
- Yau in 2026
- Born: Yau Hawk-Sau; 24 September 1990 (age 35); Hong Kong
- Education: Hong Kong Academy for Performing Arts
- Occupation: Actor
- Years active: 2012—present

Chinese name
- Traditional Chinese: 游學修
Transcriptions
Yue: Cantonese
- Yale Romanization: Yàuh Hohksāu
- Jyutping: Jau4 Hok6sau1

Neo Yau Hawk-Sau (游學修; born 24 September 1990) is a Hong Kong–based actor. He co-founded a political satire group called "Mocking Jer," which specialised in creative derivative work which satirized local news and government. In 2015, he gained recognition with his performance as the main character Pang Shing-Wa in She Remembers, He Forgets. In 2020, he co-founded the YouTube channel "Trial & Error" who produces short drama videos.

== Early life ==
He graduated from Yan Oi Tong Tin Ka Ping Secondary School and studied in the School of film and television in the Hong Kong Academy for Performing Arts for his tertiary education.

== Career ==
Yau first came into contact with film as the second assistant director in The Boy Who Shouted Teresa in 2012. He started his acting career in 2013 by acting in Sam Hui Yat (The phonetic translation of the Cantonese title, literally meaning Three Minus One). Yau gained fame after the release of She Remembers, He Forgets in 2015, in which he portrayed the young version of Pang Shing-wa (adult version portrayed by Jan Lamb). In the same year, he was invited to promote Pandora in Christmas with his then-girlfriend Cecilia So.

Yau was very passionate and enthusiastic as an actor and vowed to never give up acting. In his self-introduction in the column of Mocking Jer in Ming Pao, he affirmed that acting was his life-long career. In addition, during an interview with Cecilia So in Stand News, he compared films to his eyes such that he can see this world through movie and this is a world that he wants to dedicate himself to.

In 2019, Yau wrote, produced and directed the drama series Haters Gonna Stay and played its leading role Chau Lok-chau. The series was based on the generational tension through the narratives of Chau and his grandfather. Among the four roles he concurrently served during the production, he said he preferred that of director.

Yau starred in the 2024 drama filmThe Way We Talk, which earned him a nomination for Best Leading Actor at the 61st Golden Horse Awards, marking his first nomination for a Golden Horse Award, and received a nomination for Best Actor in the 43rd Hong Kong Film Awards in the following year.

== Other works ==
Yau had zero interest in politics when he was young, however, the protests against National Education (2012) inspired him to voice out his opinion against unpopular government policies. After the outbreak of the Umbrella Movement, Yau co-founded a political satire group called Mocking Jer in 2014. The group, consisting of young actors and dancers, produced parody videos on YouTube, such as their debut work, a derivative of Young and Dangerous, with an aim to promote awareness other young people about politics of Hong Kong. The group once had more than 30,000 subscribers and caught the attention of 100Most Magazine founder Lam Yat-hei, a local artist and supporter of the Umbrella Movement. However, Yau was warned that his political views would hurt his future career, but he believed in the message conveyed by and importance of Mocking Jer.

In October 2020, Yau co-founded a YouTube channel called Trial & Error with Hui Yin and So Chi-ho, which attracted 100,000 subscribers in two months. Their first video is a parody of Tenet with reference to the murderer of Poon Hiu-wing.

== Filmography ==
=== Movies ===
Year	Movie	Role	Character	Director	Related Artists
2012	The Boy Who Shouted Teresa	Second Assistant Director	—N/a	Sheung Man Yim	Hugo Chan, Byrant Sze
2013	Sam Hui Yat	Actor	—N/a	—N/a	So Ka-ue, Ho Chung-ken, Lui Shi-pang, Chau Nim-wa
2014	For Love, We Can	Actor	Jun	Chi-Lung Lam	Carlos Chan, Fung Lee, On-lai Liu, Derrick Ownn
2014	Thin Dream Bay	Actor	N.A.	Shu Kei	Erica Yuen Mi-ming, Howard Sit Lap-Yin
2015	She Remembers, He Forgets	Actor	Shing Wa Pang (Young)	Adam Wong	Jan Lamb, Miriam Yeung, Cecilia So, Ng Siu-hin
2015	Ten Years (4th Unit: Self-immolator)	Actor	Pak Yeung	Chow Kwun-wai	Siu Hin Ng
2018	No. 1 Chung Ying Street	Actor	So Chun-man (1967); Yat-hong (2019)		
2018	Keyboard Warriors	Actor	Lui On-ming		
2018	Distinction	Actor			
2018	Ralph Breaks the Internet	Voice Actor	Felix		
2021	The Way We Keep Dancing	Actor	Journalist	Wong Sau-ping	
2024	The Way We Talk	Actor		Adam Wong Sau-ping	Chung Suet Ying

=== Television series ===
Year	English title	Chinese title	Role	Channel	Notes
2015	Below the Lion Rock 2015:一場飯局	獅子山下2015－一場飯局	Tam Ka-ming (young)	RTHK	Unit 1
2016	Margaret and David: Green Bean	瑪嘉烈與大衛系列 - 綠豆	Chiu Tsz-lung (young)	ViuTV	
2016	3X1	三一如三	Mok Chee-fan	ViuTV	
2016	Storage Stories	有倉出租	Liu Hawk-Sau	RTHK	Episode 3
2019	Psycho Detective 2	詭探前傳	Sze-ma Chi-chuen	ViuTV	
2019	Haters Gonna Stay	仇老爺爺	Chau Lok-chau	ViuTV	Also as producer, writer and director
2022	940920	940920	Man from Future	ViuTV	Cameo appearance

== Personal life ==
On 1 December 2015, Yau announced that he was in a romantic relationship with actress Cecilia So, his co-star in She Remembers, He Forgets. Their relationship ended in 2016.

As of January 2024, Yau is dating actress Jessica Chan. The couple confirmed their relationship in April 2022.
