= Yanny Chan =

Hong Kong singer

- 陳穎欣
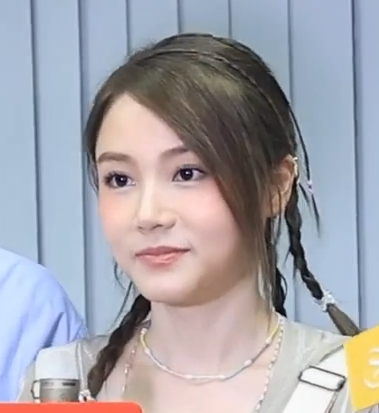
- Chan in October 2023

Yanny Chan Wing-yan (Chinese: 陳穎欣) is a Hong Kong female singer and actress. She was a member of the disbanded girl group Super Girls and is currently a member of the YouTube sketch comedy channel Trial & Error.

== Biography ==
On March 1, 2021, Chan became a permanent on-screen member of the YouTube channel Try to Be Serious. She was officially announced as a contracted artist of Trial & Error at Trial & Error physical ticket thank-you event on June 5, 2022.

== Personal life ==
As of 2025, Chan is dating musician Gareth Chan, who announced at the 2024 HITS Music Awards that they would get married.
