= All U Need Is Love =

2021 Hong Kong film by Vincent Kok

- Film poster
- Traditional Chinese: 總是有愛在隔離
- Simplified Chinese: 总是有爱在隔离
- Hanyu Pinyin: Zǒng Shì Yǒu Ài Zài Gé Lí
- Jyutping: Zung2 Jau2 Ngoi3 Zoi6 Gaak6 Lei4
- Directed by: Vincent Kok
- Written by: Steven Fung; Anselm Chan; Kelvin Lee; Edmond Wong; Huang Haohua; Deng Yunxian; Mai Jiaxi; Luo Jingyin; Ou Yingyao
- Produced by: Raymond Wong; Eric Tsang
- Starring: Louis Koo; Tony Leung; Eric Tsang; Francis Ng; Gordon Lam; Philip Keung; Julian Cheung; Louis Cheung; Carlos Chan; Fiona Sit; Alex Fong; Jenn Lau; Luk Wing; Cecilia So; Cheung Tat-ming; Michael Hui; Chin Ka-lok
- Cinematography: Tony Cheung Tung-Leung; Edmond Fung Yuen-Man; Kenny Tse
- Edited by: Hui Barfuss; Lee Ka-Wah; Li Ka-Wing; Wenders Li; Sin Man-Chiu
- Music by: Lowell Lo
- Production companies: China Star Entertainment Group; Edko Films; Emperor Motion Pictures; Mandarin Motion Pictures; Media Asia Films; Mei Ah Film Productions; One Cool Film Production; Shaw Brothers Pictures International; Sun Entertainment Culture; Universe Films Distribution
- Release date: 22 April 2021
- Running time: 95 minutes
- Country: Hong Kong
- Language: Cantonese
- Budget: HK$30 million
- Box office: HK$494,409

All U Need Is Love (Chinese: 總是有愛在隔離) is a 2021 Hong Kong comedy-drama film directed by Vincent Kok and starring an all-star ensemble cast. The film is a benefit effort for Hong Kong film industry workers affected by the COVID-19 pandemic launched by the Hong Kong Performing Artistes Guild and the Federation of Hong Kong Filmmakers, and produced by ten major local film companies.

All U Need Is Love was theatrically released on 22 April 2021.

== Plot ==
During a calm and peaceful afternoon in Hong Kong, the Grande Hotel (格尼酒店) is suddenly suspected to be the source of the COVID-19 outbreak, and the Centre for Health Protection orders the hotel to be on lockdown while all hotel guests are forced to be quarantined for 14 days to be tested. While the guests are being quarantined in the hotel, they develop deeper connections as human beings facing their situation together.

== Cast ==
- Louis Koo plays the captain of the Epidemic Prevention Operation Unit.
- Tony Leung Ka-fai plays Yam Yan-kau (任因九) (reprising his role from the 2003 film Men Suddenly in Black), a guest at Grande Hotel who is looking for an extraordinary affair.
- Eric Tsang plays Kwok Tin-yau (郭天佑), reprising his role from Men Suddenly in Black, a guest at Grande Hotel who is looking for extraordinary affairs.
- Francis Ng, Gordon Lam and Alex Fong play a trio of COVID-19 diagnosed carriers.
- Michael Hui plays the president of Grande Hotel.
- Kent Cheng and Mary Hon play a married couple.
- Candice Yu plays Kwok Tin-yau's wife.
- Fiona Sit plays a service staff of Grande Hotel who is a single mother.
- Law Lan and Alex Lam play service staffs of Grande Hotel.
- Philip Keung, Annie Liu and Ken Lo play guests at Grande Hotel.
- Yuen Qiu plays a guest at Grande Hotel, parodying her role from the 2004 film Kung Fu Hustle.
- Michael Ning plays a guest at Grande Hotel, parodying his role from the 2015 film Port of Call.
- Chrissie Chau plays a guest at Grande Hotel who is a bodybuilder who has a phobia of men.
- Julian Cheung plays Chai-yau (柴油), a guest at Grande Hotel who is a triad leader.
- Louis Cheung plays Lui Kung (雷公), a guest at Grande Hotel who is a triad leader and Chai-yau's rival.
- Larine Tang play a Japanese actress who is a guest at Grande Hotel
- Cecilia So plays Chu-chu (豬豬), a bride-to-be who is planning to hold her wedding at Grande Hotel.
- Luk Wing plays Chu-chu's fiancé.
- Carlos Chan plays the manager of Grande Hotel.
- Chin Ka-lok plays the head of security of Grande Hotel who is also the president's assistant.
- Ben Yuen
- Cheung Tat-ming as Chu-chu's father.
- Sam Lee plays the security manager of Grande Hotel.
- Jenn Lau
- Ken Wong
- Jacky Cai plays a guest at Grande Hotel who is an office lady.
- Max Cheung
- Gregory Charles Rivers
- Stephanie Che
- Pinky Cheung
- Dough-Boy
- Ng Siu-hin
- Gladys Li plays a chef at Grande Hotel.
- Ng Wing-sze
- Fung Min-hang plays the assistant of Grande Hotel's president.
- Samuel Pang
- June Lam
- Jackie Chan plays the supervisor of the Pandemic Task Force.

== Theme song ==
The film's theme song, If Love Is in Your Heart (如果心裡是愛), is composed by Lowell Lo with lyrics written by Susan Tong and is collaboratively sung by Andy Lau, Jacky Cheung, Hacken Lee, Joey Yung, Grasshopper, William So, Edmond Leung, Pakho Chau, Fiona Sit, Joyce Cheng, Stephy Tang, Stephanie Cheng, Shiga Lin and Deep Ng.

== Production ==
The film was launched by the Hong Kong Performing Artistes Guild and the Federation of Hong Kong Filmmakers as a benefit project for local film industry workers, with president of both associate bodies Louis Koo along with Eric Tsang contacting 10 of Hong Kong's major film companies, which include Koo's One Cool Film Production, China Star Entertainment Group, Edko Films, Emperor Motion Pictures, Mandarin Motion Pictures, Media Asia Films, Mei Ah Film Productions, Shaw Brothers Pictures International, Sun Entertainment Culture and Universe Films Distribution, to produce the film, with each company providing a fund of HK$3 million, while also applying for a fund of HK$9 million from the Hong Kong Film Development Council, for a total budget of HK$39 million for the film. However, the HK Film Development Council only approved 70% of HK$9 million, so Koo and Raymond Wong gave up the application and hoped to ask each film company for an extra HK$900,000 of funding, but was unsuccessful in doing so, with the final budget of the film being HK$30 million, and caused the film's post-production process being at stalemate at one point.

=== Filming ===
Principal photography for All U Need Is Love took place from May to June 2020, mainly taking place at Ocean Park's Marriott Hotel, which was used as the film's fictional central setting, Grande Hotel, with three units filming simultaneously. Due to certain actors wearing protective clothing during filming, media outlets were misled to believe that a real outbreak occurred at the amusement park.

== Release ==
All U Need Is Love was originally planned for a summer release at around July to August 2020, but was postponed due to post-production difficulties. The film was theatrically released in Hong Kong on 22 April 2021.

== Reception ==
=== Box office ===
In Hong Kong, the film debuted at No. 9 on its opening weekend, grossed HK$494,409 during its first four days of release.

=== Critical reception ===
Lim Lian-yu of Yahoo! Singapore gave the film a score of 3/5 stars and describes its star-studded cast as its most interesting element but also notes the abundance of actors cannot be fully utilised. Edmund Lee of the South China Morning Post gave the film a score of 2.5/5 stars and describes it as an "uninspiring movie" but "there is still some mindless fun to be had". Jeanmarie Tan of The New Paper gave the film a score of 1.5/5 and criticizes its dated slapstick, sexual humor and overacting.
