= List of TV and films with critiques of Chinese Communist Party =

This list shows TV and film content that includes at least one critique of the Chinese Communist Party's actions. The list helps to understand where censorship of content outside of China by its ruling party has taken place, and where it hasn't.

== Films by major studios ==
These films by major studios tend to receive far greater financing, advertising and reach than independent films

Title	Year	Type	Producer
No major films critique China after 1997
Kundun	1997	Drama	Disney
Seven Years in Tibet	1997	Drama	Sony
Red Corner	1997	Mystery/thriller	MGM

== Independent films ==
Independent films are done outside of a major studio and often include documentaries

Title	Year	Type	Producer	Distributor
Revolution of Our Times	2021	Documentary	Kiwi Chow	
Mission: Joy - Finding Happiness in Troubled Times	2021	Documentary	Peggy Callahan, Mark Monroe	Netflix
China Undercover	2020	Investigative	Frontline	PBS
PBS Newshour Presents: China: Power and Prosperity	2020	News		PBS
Do Not Split	2020	Documentary	Anders Hammer, Charlotte Cook	Field of Vision
Tiananmen: The People vs. the Party	2019	Documentary		PBS
Joshua: Teenager vs. Superpower	2017	Documentary	Mark Rinehart, Matthew Torne, Andrew Duncan, Joe Piscatella	Netflix
Tibetan Warrior: The True Story of One Man's Fight for Freedom	2015	Documentary	Urs Schnell	
Ten Years	2015	Sci-fi		
Tibet's End? Sterilization in the Land of Snows	2015	Documentary	Blake Kerr	
Hong Kong will be Destroyed after 33 Years	2014	Sci-fi		
The Dossier	2014			
The River of Life	2014			
I Want To Be a People's Representative	2014			
Uyghurs: Prisoners of the Absurd	2014	Documentary	Patricio Henríquez, Colette Loumède	
Miss Tibet: Beauty in Exile	2014	Documentary	Norah Shapiro	
Web Junkie	2013	Documentary	Hilla Medalia, Shosh Shlam, Neta Zwebner-Zaibert	
A Touch of Sin	2013	Thriller	Shôzô Ichiyama	
When Night Falls	2012	Drama		
Listening to Third Grandmother's Stories	2012			
Female Directors	2012			
People's Park	2012	Musical Documentary		
Ping'an Xueqing	2011			
Tibet: In the Land of the Brave	2011	Documentary	Geneviève Brault	
Tibet in Song	2009	Documentary	Ngawang Choephel	
Tibet: Beyond Fear	2008	Documentary	Michael Perlman	
Tibet: Murder in the Snow	2008	Documentary	Sally Ingleton	
Tibet: Cry of the Snow Lion	2003	Documentary	Maria Florio, Victoria Mudd, Sue Peosay, Tom Peosay	
The Gate of Heavenly Peace	1995	Documentary	Richard Gordon and Carma Hinton	
Tibet: A Buddhist Trilogy	1984	Documentary	Graham Coleman	

== See also ==
- Apple TV+#2023
- Beijing Independent Film Festival
- Chinese censorship abroad
- Cinema of Hong Kong
- Cinema of South Korea
- Cinema of Taiwan
- Cinema of the United States
- Film industry
- Nazism and cinema: Censorship abroad
- Self-censorship
