= Far Far Away (film) =

2021 Hong Kong film by Amos Why

- Theatrical release poster
- Traditional Chinese: 緣路山旮旯
- Simplified Chinese: 缘路山旮旯
- Literal meaning: "Affinity at the far edges"
- Hanyu Pinyin: Yuán lù shān gā lá
- Jyutping: jyun4 lou6 saan1 kaa1 laa1
- Directed by: Amos Why
- Written by: Amos Why
- Produced by: Winnie Tsang; Amos Why; Teresa Kwong
- Starring: Kaki Sham; Cecilia So; Rachel Leung; Hanna Chan; Jennifer Yu; Crystal Cheung
- Cinematography: Leung Ming Kai
- Edited by: Jefferson Lai; Key Tan
- Production companies: Golden Scene Company; Dot 2 Dot Production
- Release dates: 14 November 2021 (Hong Kong Asian FF); 4 August 2022 (Hong Kong)
- Running time: 96 minutes
- Country: Hong Kong
- Language: Cantonese
- Box office: US$1.2 million

Far Far Away (Chinese: 緣路山旮旯) is a 2021 Hong Kong romantic comedy film and the third full-length feature written and directed by Amos Why. The film follows a 28-year-old introverted IT geek who is inexperienced in dating, but suddenly finds himself romantically involved with five attractive women at different times, all are living in New Territories or Outlying Islands, Hong Kong.

It premiered as the closing film of the 2021 Hong Kong Asian Film Festival, and screened at the Osaka Asian Film Festival, New York Asian Film Festival, as well as the Far East Film Festival in Udine. It was theatrically released in Hong Kong on 4 August 2022.

== Cast ==
- Kaki Sham as Hau
- Cecilia So as A. Lee, living in Sha Tau Kok
- Rachel Leung as Mena Man, living in Tai O
- Hanna Chan as Lisa, living in Lai Chi Wo
- Jennifer Yu as Melanie, living in Sea Ranch, Lantau Island
- Crystal Cheung as Fleur, living in Pak Nai, Lau Fau Shan
- Will Or as Tai-tung
- Yatho Wong as Jude Law
- Ning Chan as Gigi
- Peter Chan as Manager
- Adam Wong as Colleague Chris
- Manson Cheung as Mena's boyfriend

== Awards and nominations ==
Awards	Category	Recipient	Result	Ref.
59th Golden Horse Awards	Best Supporting Actress	Jennifer Yu	Nominated	
41st Hong Kong Film Awards	Best Supporting Actress	Jennifer Yu	Nominated	
