= Tibet: Cry of the Snow Lion =

- Directed by: Tom Peosay
- Written by: Maria Florio; Victoria Mudd; Sue Peosay
- Narrated by: Martin Sheen
- Music by: Jeff Beal
- Release date: 2002
- Running time: 104 minutes
- Country: United States
- Language: English

Tibet: Cry of the Snow Lion is a 2002 documentary film about the Chinese occupation of Tibet directed by Tom Peosay. It is narrated by Martin Sheen and Tibetan voiceovers are provided by Edward Edwards, Ed Harris, Tim Robbins, Susan Sarandon and Shirley Knight. This film won the "Audience Award for Best Documentary" at the 2003 Santa Barbara International Film Festival. It was also the 2003 "Official Selection" at Toronto International Film Festival, Seattle International Film Festival and Los Angeles Film Festival.

A Los Angeles Times movie reviewer wrote, "the most comprehensive and devastating documentary yet on that tragic country, ends with a note of optimism from the Dalai Lama in the face of the suffering and oppression of his people. (...) Since the Chinese invaded Tibet, which has a population of 6 million, in the wake of the Communist Revolution more than half a century ago, an estimated 1.2 million Tibetans have died in the course of a brutal occupation, and approximately 3,000 people risk their lives every year hiking over the Himalayas to escape."

The New York Times review stated, "impeccably made, often moving account of the captive nation of Tibet, forcibly annexed by China more than 50 years ago. (...) in fact, the monasteries were systematically destroyed by Chinese military forces in the late 1950s and early 60s. (...) A more concise and affecting summation of the Tibetan crisis would be hard to imagine."

== Reception ==
On review aggregator website Rotten Tomatoes, the film holds an approval rating of 86% based on 49 reviews, with an average rating of 7.6/10.

== See also ==
List of TV and films critical of Chinese Communist Party
