= Cecilia So =

Hong Kong actress (born 1992)

- 蘇麗珊
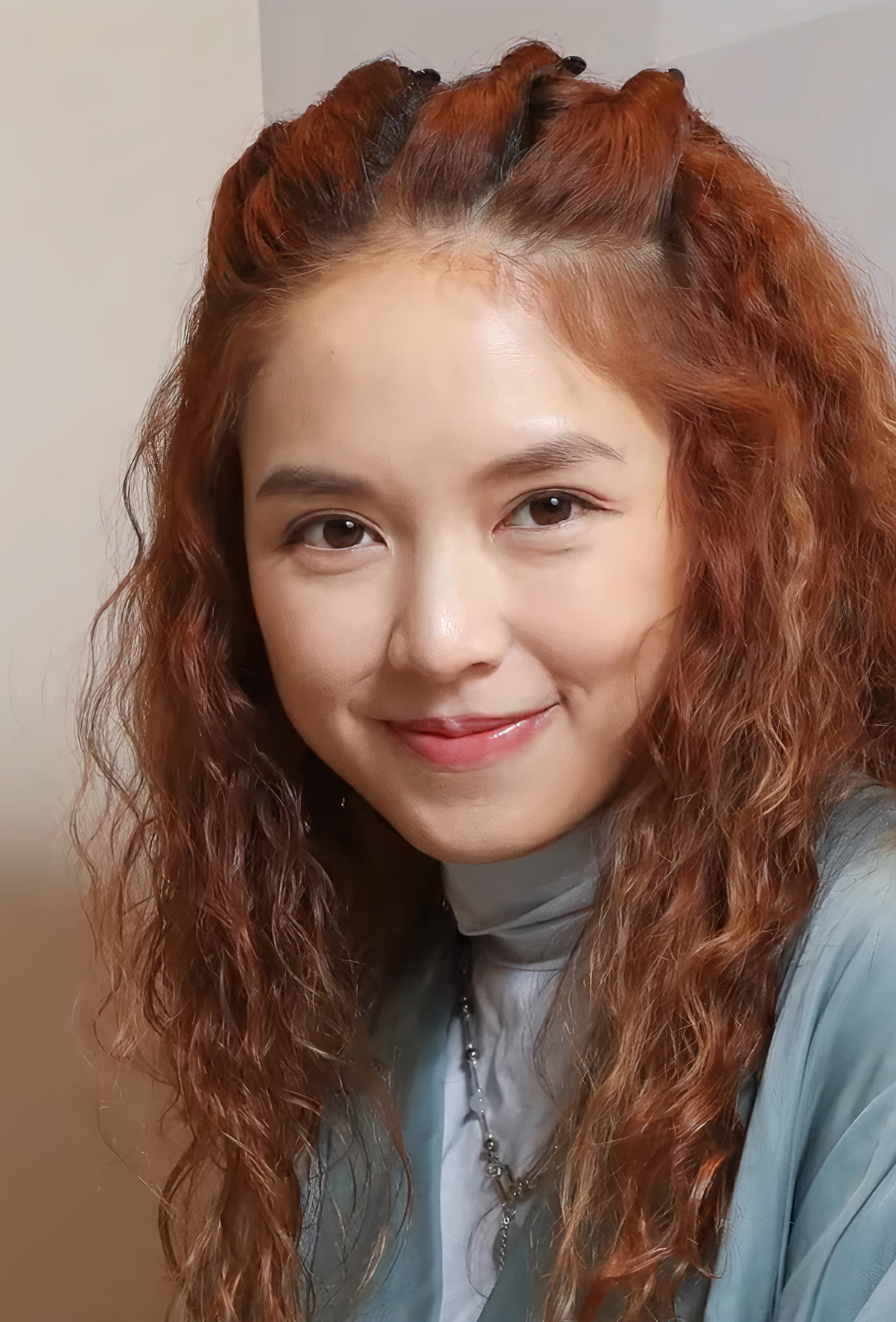
- So in December 2021
- Born: So Lai-shan; 6 August 1992 (age 34); Hong Kong
- Education: Hong Kong Polytechnic University (BSc)
- Occupation: Actress
- Years active: 2015–present

Cecilia So Lai-shan (Chinese: 蘇麗珊; born 6 August 1992) is a Hong Kong actress. She made her acting debut as Gigi in the romance film She Remembers, He Forgets (2015), for which she received nominations for Best New Performer in the 52nd Golden Horse Awards and 35th Hong Kong Film Awards. She then landed leading roles in the films Never Too Late (2017), Napping Kid (2018), Hell Bank Presents: Running Ghost (2020), and Far Far Away (2021).

== Early life and education ==
So was born on 6 August 1992. She grew up in a single-parent family, with her father leaving before she was old enough to remember. Raised by her grandparents at a young age, she later lived with her mother and cousin from primary school onward, residing in a public housing estate. So had learned piano and began entering singing contests, aspiring to become a singer as a child. She attended Tin Ka Ping Secondary School, and considered herself to have good academic results. In Form 5, she signed with a talent agency as a model, citing "curiosity" as her motivation, but eventually stopped taking jobs to prepare for the Hong Kong Advanced Level Examination in Form 7. She continued modeling during her university years, including shooting covers for Weekend Weekly from 2011 to 2015. So studied at Hong Kong Polytechnic University and graduated in 2014 with a Bachelor of Science in Environmental Engineering and Sustainable Development. She originally intended to pursue a career with environmental protection NGOs after graduation. However, after completing her graduation exam in May 2014, she happened to see an open casting call for Adam Wong's new film, which she applied for, describing her motivation as "trying to see what acting is like". After shooting the film, So developed an interest in acting and enrolled in an acting for film program at the New York Film Academy.

== Career ==
In 2015, So made her acting debut in the romance film She Remembers, He Forgets, where she shared a lead role with Miriam Yeung as the younger version of Gigi, a member of a close-knit trio of friends who secretly loves Ng Siu-hin's character but ultimately ends up marrying Neo Yau's character in the future. She was personally cast by director Adam Wong during the audition, and So credited her previous modeling experience with helping her feel comfortable in front of the camera. Rob Hunter of Film School Rejects particularly praised So, stating that she "steals the show", with "her chemistry with the boys revealing a sincere sweetness and relatable energy"; while Edmund Lee of South China Morning Post also acknowledged So's casting, describing it as "adding a further sheen to the story". She received nominations for Best New Performer in the 52nd Golden Horse Awards and Best New Performer in the 35th Hong Kong Film Awards with the role. Following her breakout performance, she signed with Media Asia Entertainment Group and began receiving offers for film roles. She starred as the female lead alongside Alex Fong in Patrick Kong's romance film Never Too Late, and took on a supporting role as Max Zhang's adoptive daughter in the crime thriller The Brink. Edmund Lee called So "one of Hong Kong's best young actresses", but he called her role in Never Too Late "a miscast" in his South China Morning Post review.

In 2018, she appeared in all three new year films, playing the younger version of Gigi Leung's character in The Monkey King 3, a lead role as a young idol alongside Larine Tang in Agent Mr Chan, and making a cameo appearance in Patrick Kong's A Beautiful Moment, where she portrayed the younger version of Chung Ka-bo (played by Carina Lau). That same year, she starred alongside her She Remembers, He Forgets co-star Ng Siu Hin as a criminal mastermind in the mystery thriller Napping Kid, and appeared in Infernal Affairs, the spinoff web series of the Infernal Affairs film series, as a police detective and the daughter of the deceased Chan Wing-yan (played by Tony Leung Chiu-wai in Infernal Affairs). In 2019, she joined an ensemble cast featuring Kent Cheng, Elaine Jin, and Babyjohn Choi as jury members in the crime film Guilt by Design. Edmund Lee of South China Morning Post lamented the lack of screen-time for So and the rest of the ensemble cast, stating that their characters were only "there to serve functions of the plot, no more". In late 2019, So initially planned to take a hiatus from acting and enrolled in a two-year acting program in the United States. However, after one semester, the COVID-19 pandemic broke out, leading to the suspension of classes and forcing So to quit and return to Hong Kong.

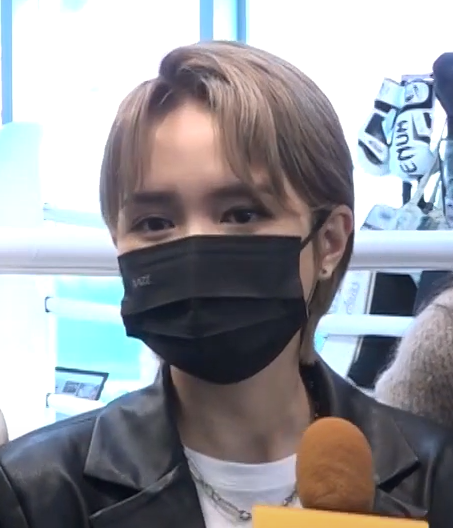
So interviewed by am730 in November 2022

In 2020, So landed a starring role alongside Wong You-nam in the horror comedy film Hell Bank Presents: Running Ghost, portraying Chiu Ling-kay, a woman who can communicate with the dead. Alex Chung of HK01 praised So's performance as "lively and natural", highlighting her strong chemistry with co-star Wong You-nam; while Tay Yek Keak of Today compared her character to Whoopi Goldberg's in Ghost. The following year, she had a main role in the ViuTV drama series Generation Slash, and later appeared as a bride holding her wedding in a quarantined hotel with her fiancé (played by Luk Wing) in All U Need Is Love. She then starred as A Lee, one of five leading actresses alongside Jennifer Yu, Crystal Cheung, Rachel Leung, and Hanna Chan, who has a relationship with Kaki Sham in Far Far Away. Ho Tak, writing for Harper's Bazaar, described So's performance as "eye-catching" and noted the challenge of portraying her character. In 2022, she appeared in the anthology film Tales from the Occult as a social media influencer. She also took on a main role as a business tycoon in the boxing-themed ViuTV sports series Rope a Dope, but her performance in the series was negatively received. That same year, So signed with Warner Music Hong Kong and debuted as a singer with songs she had written during the pandemic. She received a bronze prize for Most Promising Artist in the 2023 Top Ten Chinese Gold Songs Awards. However, she terminated her contract with Warner Music prematurely in August 2024, with reports from Oriental Daily News and am730 indicating her dissatisfaction with the lack of job opportunities during her time as an artist with the label.

== Personal life ==
So began dating her She Remembers, He Forgets co-star Neo Yau in December 2015, and they broke up in October 2016. In 2022, she opened a massage café with her boyfriend.

== Filmography ==
=== Film ===
Year	Title	Role	Notes/Ref.
2015	She Remembers, He Forgets	Gigi (余鳳芝)	
2017	Never Too Late	Boey (細寶)	
2017	The Brink	Sai Gau's daughter	
2018	The Monkey King 3	Young Advisor (國師)	
2018	Agent Mr Chan	Angela Lam (林楚楚)	
2018	A Beautiful Moment	Chung Ka-bo (鍾嘉寶)	Cameo
2018	Napping Kid	Siu-yu (小儒)	
2019	Guilt by Design	Fong Wai-shan (方慧珊)	
2020	Hell Bank Presents: Running Ghost	Chiu Ling-kay (趙凌琪)	
2021	All U Need Is Love	Chu-chu (豬豬)	
2021	Far Far Away	A. Lee	
2022	Tales from the Occult	Garuda (金翅鳥)	

=== Television ===
Year	Title	Role	Notes/Ref.
2018	Infernal Affairs	Chan Yuet-kei (陳玥琪)	Main role
2021	Generation Slash	Mok Tsz-yui (莫梓蕊)	Main role
2022	Rope a Dope	Fan Siu-fung (范兆風)	Main role

== Awards and nominations ==
Year	Award	Category	Work	Result	Ref.
2015	52nd Golden Horse Awards	Best New Performer	She Remembers, He Forgets	Nominated	
2016	35th Hong Kong Film Awards	Best New Performer	She Remembers, He Forgets	Nominated	
2023	2023 Top Ten Chinese Gold Songs Awards	Most Promising Artist	—N/a	Bronze	
