= Guilt by Design =

2019 Hong Kong-Chinese film by Lai Siu-kwan, Paul Sze, and Lau Wing-tai

- Theatrical release poster

Chinese name
- Traditional Chinese: 催眠·裁決
Transcriptions
Yue: Cantonese
- Jyutping: Ceoi^{1} Min^{4} Coi^{4} Kyut^{3}
- Directed by: Lai Siu-kwan; Paul Sze; Lau Wing-tai
- Produced by: Derek Yee
- Starring: Nick Cheung; Hans Zhang; Paul Chun; Kent Cheng; Cheung Siu-fai; Elaine Jin
- Distributed by: Mei Ah Entertainment; Dahe Pictures
- Release dates: 25 October 2019 (China); 15 November 2019 (Hong Kong)
- Running time: 90 minutes
- Countries: Hong Kong; China
- Language: Cantonese

Guilt by Design (Chinese: 催眠·裁決) is a 2019 crime thriller film written and directed by Lai Siu-kwan, Paul Sze, and Lau Wing-tai. A Hong Kong-Chinese co-production, the film stars Nick Cheung, alongside an ensemble cast that includes Hans Zhang, Paul Chun, Kent Cheng, Cheung Siu-fai, and Elaine Jin. It is one of the award-winning film projects of the Hong Kong Asia Film Financing Forum.

== Plot ==
On the last day of the trial for the Lin family murder case that shocked Hong Kong, as the jury was about to retire to deliberate, one of the members, Xu Lisheng (Zhang Jiahui), suddenly receives a message that his daughter Yinyin (Amy) has been kidnapped. The mysterious kidnapper demands that Lisheng, a former international hypnosis expert, use hypnosis to ensure the jury finds the defendant guilty, or his daughter will be killed. This means Lisheng must secretly hypnotize at least four people in a confined space, under everyone’s watch, without any professional tools. Lisheng quietly forwards the kidnapping message to his brother-in-law, Yang Kai (Zhang Han), a former member of the domestic special forces, before entering the jury deliberation room.

== Cast ==
- Nick Cheung as Hui Lap-sang, a psychiatrist and hypnotist who serves as a juror in the Lin Family Yacht murder
- Hans Zhang as Yang Kai, an ex-soldier and Hui's brother-in-law
- Paul Chun as Lam Kwok-kuen, a billionaire and the father of Lam Pak-ming, the culprit of the Lam Family Yacht murder
- Kent Cheng as Leung, a social worker and the chairman of the jury for the Lam Family Yacht murder
- Cheung Siu-Fai as Tang Siu-Keung, a hitman hired by Lam Kwok-kuen
- Elaine Jin as Lau, a housewife and one of the jurors for the Lam Family Yacht murder
- Babyjohn Choi as Chan Wing-hei, a geographer and one of the jurors for the Lam Family Yacht murder
- Cecilia So as Fong Wai-shan, one of the jurors for the Lam Family Yacht murder
- Jo Kuk as May Yim, one of the jurors for the Lam Family Yacht murder
- Jiro Lee as Chow Hung, one of the jurors for the Lam Family Yacht murder who was bribed by Lam Kwok-kuen
- Vincent Wong as Lam Pak-ming, Lam Kwok-kuen's son who murdered on his family's yacht
- Derek Kok as Peter, a businessman and friend of Hui Lap-sang
- Ai Mi as Hui Chung-yan, the daughter of Hui Lap-sang
- Renci Yeung as Lam Tsz-ying, the wrongly accused defendant of the Lam Family Yacht murder
- Felix Lok as Fung Hin-fai, Lam's lawyer

== Movie Songs ==
| Type | Song Title | Composer | Lyricist | Arranger | Music Producer | Singer |
|---|---|---|---|---|---|---|
| Theme Song | "Lingering at the Twilight Street Corner" | Chung Chi Wing | Chung Chi Wing / Cheung Siu Hung | Cheung Siu Hung | Chung Chi Wing, Cheung Siu Hung | Lau Shuang Ning |

== Awards and nominations ==
| Year | Award Ceremony | Award | Name | Result |
|---|---|---|---|---|
| 2019 | 15th China-US Film Festival | Top Ten Golden Angel Awards of the Year | | Won |

== Production ==
Scenes were shot at Admiralty High Court of Hong Kong, Kai Tak Industrial Trade Tower, Tseung Kwan O Sports Ground, Tin Shui Wai Wetland Park Road, the area around Lau Fau Shan, and Central Chater Road (in front of Alexandra House), Clear Water BayHong Kong Adventist College
