= Web Junkie =

- Sundance film poster
- Directed by: Hilla Medalia; Shosh Shlam
- Written by: Hilla Medalia; Shosh Shlam
- Produced by: Hilla Medalia; Shosh Shlam; Neta Zwebner-Zaibert
- Cinematography: Shaoguang Sun
- Edited by: Enat Sidi
- Music by: Ran Bagno
- Production companies: Chicken And Egg Pictures; Impact Partners; Shlam Productions
- Distributed by: Dogwoof Pictures
- Release date: July 10, 2013 (Jerusalem Film Festival)
- Running time: 79 minutes
- Countries: Israel; United States
- Language: English

Web Junkie is a 2013 American-Israeli documentary film co-written, directed and produced by Hilla Medalia and Shosh Shlam. The film premiered at the 2013 Jerusalem Film Festival on July 10, 2013.

The film also premiered in-competition in the World Cinema Documentary Competition at 2014 Sundance Film Festival on January 19, 2014.

After its premiere at the Sundance Film Festival, Dogwoof Pictures acquired the worldwide distribution rights of the film. The film will be broadcast in the UK at BBC Storyville, who has acquired the British TV rights of the film.

== Synopsis ==
The film focuses on the Chinese government's classification of internet addiction as a clinical disorder and focuses on the treatment used in Chinese rehabilitation centres.

== Reception ==
Web Junkie received mostly positive reviews upon its premiere at the 2014 Sundance Film Festival. Review aggregator Rotten Tomatoes gives the film a 67% rating based on reviews from 6 critics, with an average score of 6.1/10.

Dennis Harvey of Variety, wrote in his review that "A bizarre and entertaining documentary about China's attempts to reprogram its Internet-addicted youth." Duane Byrge in his review for The Hollywood Reporter called the film "A startling look at China’s Internet addiction centers." Drew Taylor from Indiewire praised the film by writing that "The specificity of the documentary...is one of its biggest strengths since it is able to place you right alongside these kids...But it also has the effect of being even more heartbreaking." Dan Fienberg of HitFix gave the film grade B and wrote that "Web Junkie is a little sad, a little funny and a little scary. I'd say that I wish it had been a little more provocative, but I'm sure conversations after screenings will serve some of that purpose and those are conversations worth having." In her review for The Telegraph, Amber Wilkinson praised the directors of the film that "Directors Shosh Shlam and Hilla Medalia get a remarkable amount of access to one of 400 rehabilitation camps set up in China." However Dan Schindel of Movie Mezzanine criticized the film, writing that "What really undoes the film is its formlessness."

== Accolades ==
Year	Award	Category	Recipient	Result
2013	Jerusalem Film Festival	Honorable Mention	Hilla Medalia and Shosh Shlam	Nominated
2014	Sundance Film Festival	World Cinema Grand Jury Prize: Documentary	Hilla Medalia and Shosh Shlam	Nominated

== See also ==
- List of TV and films with critiques of Chinese Communist Party
