= Ng Siu-hin =

Hong Kong actor (born 1993)

- 吳肇軒
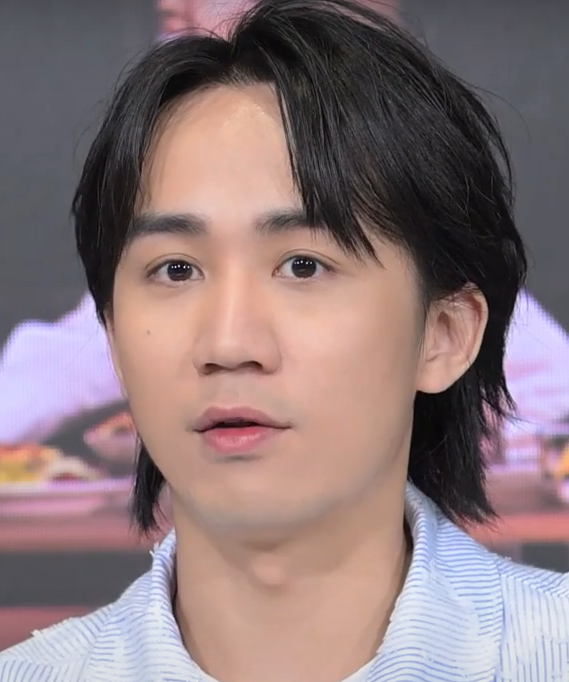
- Ng in October 2023
- Born: 9 July 1993 (age 33); Hong Kong
- Education: Hong Kong Academy of Performing Arts (BFA)
- Occupation: Actor
- Years active: 2015–present

Ng Siu-hin (Chinese: 吳肇軒; born 9 July 1993) is a Hong Kong actor best known for his debut role as So Pok-man in the romance film She Remembers, He Forgets (2015), for which he was nominated for Best Actor in the 22nd Hong Kong Film Critics Society Awards, and as Au Yeung Kin-fung in the political anthology film Ten Years (2015). In 2017, he received another Best Actor nomination in the 24th Hong Kong Film Critics Society Awards for his performance in In Your Dreams.

== Early life and education ==
Ng was born on 9 July 1993. He grew up in Lam Tei, Tuen Mun, and attended Yan Oi Tong Tin Ka Ping Secondary School. He developed an interest in performing at a young age and aspired to become an actor. Ng described his school years as "lazy" and "disheartened", and he became fascinated with Japanese, Taiwanese, and Korean television shows during secondary school. He only scored 10 marks in the Hong Kong Certificate of Education Examination and enrolled at San Wui Commercial Society Secondary School to retake his exams. He joined the drama club and was exposed to acting in San Wui, and he won the grand prize and best screenplay in a district drama competition for a stage play he wrote. Ng then studied performing arts and graduated with a Bachelor of Fine Arts from the Hong Kong Academy of Performing Arts. He was cast in Adam Wong's She Remembers, He Forgets during his third year of study.

== Career ==
In 2015, Ng made his acting debut as So Pok-man, a member of a close-knit trio of friends, alongside Cecilia So and Neo Yau in She Remembers, He Forgets. Edmund Lee of South China Morning Post praised his casting, describing it as "adding a further sheen to the story", and he was nominated for Best Actor in the 22nd Hong Kong Film Critics Society Awards for this role. He also starred in the political anthology film Ten Years in the segment Self-immolator, portraying Au Yeung Kin-fung, a student democracy activist. The film won Best Film in the 35th Hong Kong Film Awards. Ng received a supporting role in the 2016 drama film Mad World, and landed his first leading role in Carina Lau's 2017 drama In Your Dreams, where Edmund Lee described him as the "true protagonist" of the film in his South China Morning Post review. Lau cast Ng due to his aura which resembles Tony Leung Chiu-wai. He was nominated for Best Actor again in the 24th Hong Kong Film Critics Society Awards for the role. Ng also made his stage acting debut in The Rose of The Name that same year.

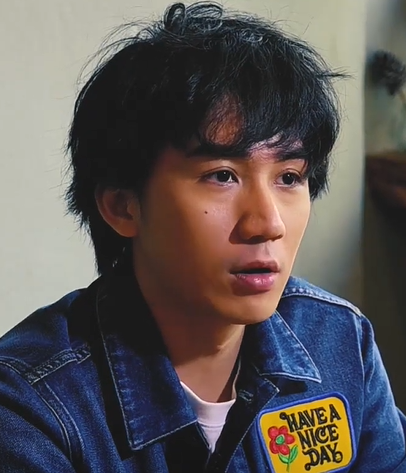
Ng interviewed by Hong Kong Economic Times in July 2020

In 2018, Ng starred as Chik, a technician involved in solving a crime, alongside his She Remembers, He Forgets co-star Cecilia So in Napping Kid. He then took on a supporting role as Vincent, a lawyer and the husband of Jennifer Yu's character, in the drama film Tracey. He also appeared in the ViuTV drama series Afterlife Firm and the web series Shadow of Justice in the same year. In 2019, Ng appeared in supporting roles as Lo Bun-hong in the comedy film A Home with a View, and as Handiwork, a petty thief, in the crime film A Witness Out of the Blue. He also appeared in the ViuTV series Stained and The Republic that year. In 2020, Ng starred as Zulie, who provokes his best friend (played by Isaac Yang) to lose his virginity on his 18th birthday, in the Taiwanese drama film Leaving Virginia. Cheng Bing-hong, writing for Yahoo! Lifestyle, commended the film's adaptation of Ng's Hong Kong background into the plot and character.

Ng also starred as Ling Su Fei, the male lead and a trainee real estate agent, in the 2020 ViuTV comedy series Who Sells Bricks in Hong Kong. He then made cameo appearances in Adam Wong's drama film The Way We Keep Dancing, comedy film All U Need Is Love, and as an inventor residing in a dystopian slum in the sci-fi film Warriors of Future. In 2023, Ng appeared in leading roles in the horror film It Remains, as well as in the ViuTV series Food Buddies and Tales at the Corner. He also starred as Manny, a young man living with his single father (played by Ben Yuen) in the drama film Stand Up Story. Edmund Lee praised Ng's performances as "consistently heartfelt"; while Alex Chung of HK01 highlighted the evolution in Ng's acting, highlighting his "multifaceted delivery and the layers" he brought to his portrayal. Ng also played a supporting role as a mathematics major who becomes an ICAC investigator in the crime film The Goldfinger, where Keith Ho praised Ng's performance in his review for HK01, highlighting the character's stark contrast to his usual comedic roles and commending his ability to deliver a "precise and lively" portrayal.

== Filmography ==
=== Film ===
Year	Title	Role	Notes/Ref.
2015	She Remembers, He Forgets	So Pok-man (蘇博文)	
2015	Ten Years	Au-yeung Kin-fung (歐陽健鋒)	Segment: Self-immolator
2016	Mad World	Cable guy (寬頻仔)	
2017	In Your Dreams	Cheung Tsz-hang (張子行)	
2018	Napping Kid	Chik (阿植)	
2018	Tracey	Vincent Tung (佟立賢)	
2019	A Home with a View	Lo Bun-hong (盧奔康)	
2019	A Witness Out of the Blue	Handiwork (手作仔)	
2019	Ciao UFO	Hofung (林可峰)	
2020	Leaving Virginia	Zulie (陳祖烈)	
2021	The Way We Keep Dancing	Heyo's brother	Special appearance
2021	All U Need Is Love	Hotel resident	Cameo
2022	Warriors of Future	Citizen A	Cameo
2023	It Remains	Ng Ho-tin (吳浩天)	
2023	Stand Up Story	Chim Cheuk-man (詹卓文)	
2023	Night School	Yin (言仔)	
2023	The Goldfinger	Chim Man-wai (詹文偉)	

=== Television ===
Year	Title	Role	Notes/Ref.
2018	Afterlife Firm	Wong Yi (王爾)	Main role
2018	Shadow of Justice	Cheung Sek-hoi (張碩海)	Recurring role
2019	Stained	Sek Chun (石晉)	Recurring role
2019	The Republic	Cheung Ho-ming (張皓明)	Main role
2020	Who Sells Bricks in Hong Kong	Ling Wu Fei (令狐飛)	Main role
2023	Food Buddies	Wong Chi-tak (王智德)	Main role
2023	Tales at the Corner	Marco	Main role

== Awards and nominations ==
Year	Award	Category	Work	Result	Ref.
2015	22nd Hong Kong Film Critics Society Awards	Best Actor	She Remembers, He Forgets	Nominated	
2017	24th Hong Kong Film Critics Society Awards	Best Actor	In Your Dreams	Nominated	
