= A Witness Out of the Blue =

2019 Hong Kong film by Derek Yee

- Film poster
- Traditional Chinese: 犯罪現場
- Simplified Chinese: 犯罪现场
- Hanyu Pinyin: Fàn Zuì Xiàn Chǎng
- Jyutping: Faan3 Zeoi3 Jin3 Ceong4
- Directed by: Andrew Fung
- Written by: Andrew Fung
- Produced by: Derek Yee
- Starring: Louis Koo; Louis Cheung; Jessica Hsuan; Cherry Ngan; Philip Keung
- Cinematography: Kenny Tse
- Edited by: Law Wing-cheung; Kelvin Chau
- Music by: Peter Kam
- Production companies: One Cool Film Production; Guang Dong Century Coast Pictures; Media Asia Films; Sun Entertainment Culture; Lian Ray Picturrs; Zhe Jiang Hengdian Film; Big Honor Entertainment; China Film Media Asia Audio Video Distribution; Beijing Jurongyouhe Technology; Sky Film International Entertainment; Guangdong Quasar Culture & Technology; Imagi International Holdings; Trillion Production; Tianjin Maoyan Writing Media; Shanghai Tao Piao Piao Movie & TV Culture; Leading PR & Promotion
- Distributed by: One Cool Pictures (Hong Kong & Worldwide); Edko Films (Hong Kong)
- Release dates: 18 October 2019 (HKAFF); 24 October 2019 (Hong Kong)
- Running time: 104 minutes
- Country: Hong Kong
- Language: Cantonese
- Box office: US$37.09 million

A Witness Out of the Blue is a 2019 Hong Kong crime thriller film produced by Derek Yee and written and directed by Andrew Fung. The film stars Louis Koo as a robber who becomes a prime suspect of a new murder case in which the only witness is a talking parrot present during the scene. A Witness Out of the Blue premiered at the Hong Kong Asian Film Festival on 18 October 2019 before it was theatrically released on 24 October 2019 in Hong Kong. The film was also shown at the International Film Festival Rotterdam from 28 January to 1 February 2020.

== Plot ==
Sean Wong (Louis Koo) leads an armed robbery at a jewelry shop. Three months later, Wong's partner in crime, Homer Tsui (Deep Ng), is found dead inside an apartment and Chief Inspector Yip Sau-ching (Philip Keung) suspects Wong to be the culprit in the murder of Tsui. The only apparent witness to the murder case is a talking parrot that was present inside the apartment room during the crime scene. Wong sets out to find out the real murderer in order to clear his name and avenge his partner.

== Cast ==
- Louis Koo as Sean Wong (汪新元)
- Louis Cheung as Larry Lam (林法樑)
- Jessica Hsuan as Joy Ting (丁喜悅)
- Cherry Ngan as Charmaine Hui (許少梅)
- Philip Keung as Yip Sau-ching (葉守正)
- Fiona Sit as Cindy Yeung (楊見珊)
- Patrick Tam as Bull Yiu (姚笙)
- Andy On as Tony Ho (何兆東)
- Ling Man-lung as Redhead (洪小武)
- Sam Lee as Clark Au-yeung (歐陽剋儉)
- Evergreen Mak as Crab (昌哥)
- Power Chan as Donkey (大雄)
- Tsui Kwong-lam as Uncle Monk (凱叔)
- Annie Liu as Ms. Expert (special appearance)
- Jacky Cai as Au-yeung's girlfriend (special appearance)
- Ng Siu-hin as Handiwork (手作仔) (special appearance)
- Deno Cheung as Lui Yau-piu (雷友彪)
- Chan Kin-on as Internal affairs officer
- Chan Lai-wan as Bull's mother
- Amy Tam as Donkey's wife
- Terry Zou as Harry (亨少)
- Danny Chan as Bad guy
- Aaron Chow as Food delivery guy
- Ben Cheung as Keeper
- Andrew Fung as Footballer
- Law Wing-cheung as Cafe owner

== Critical reception ==
A Witness Out of the Blue received generally positive reviews. Edmund Lee of the South China Morning Post gave the film a score of 3.5/5 stars, praising the performances by Louis Koo and Louis Cheung, and describes the film as director Andrew Fung's best effort to date. Gabriel Chong of Movie Xclusive gave the film a similar score of 3.5/5, praising Koo's commitment to his role and the well-paced mystery from start to end. Andrew Chan of Film Critics Circle of Australia gave the film a score of 7.5/10 on his blog, praising the performances by the cast and sums up the film as "an effective crime thriller that lacks a sharpening cutting edge."

== Awards and nominations ==
Ceremony	Category	Recipient	Results
39th Hong Kong Film Awards	Best Actor	Louis Koo	Nominated
39th Hong Kong Film Awards	Best Supporting Actor	Philip Keung	Nominated
39th Hong Kong Film Awards	Best Action Choreography	Jack Wong	Nominated
39th Hong Kong Film Awards	Best Cinematography	Kenny Tse	Nominated
39th Hong Kong Film Awards	Best Film Editing	Law Wing-cheung, Kelvin Chau	Nominated
39th Hong Kong Film Awards	Best Art Direction	Chet Chan	Nominated
3rd Kongest Film Awards	My Favorite Hong Kong Film	A Witness Out of the Blue	Nominated
Hong Kong Screenwriters' Guild Awards 2020	Recommend Screenplay Award	Andrew Fung	Nominated
Hong Kong Screenwriters' Guild Awards 2020	Best Film Character Award	Louis Cheung	Nominated
3rd Movie6 Film Awards	Best Film	A Witness Out of the Blue	Won
3rd Movie6 Film Awards	Best Director	Andrew Fung	Won
3rd Movie6 Film Awards	Best Actor	Louis Koo	Nominated
3rd Movie6 Film Awards	Best Actor	Louis Cheung	Nominated
3rd Movie6 Film Awards	Best Actress	Jessica Hsuan	Won
3rd Movie6 Film Awards	Best Supporting Actor	Philip Keung	Nominated
3rd Movie6 Film Awards	Best Supporting Actress	Fiona Sit	Nominated
Vote for Hong Kong Movies Awards 2020	Best Actor	Louis Koo	Won
Vote for Hong Kong Movies Awards 2020	Best Supporting Actor	Philip Keung	Won
