= Hong Kong Performing Artistes Guild =

- 香港演藝人協會
- Founded: 1993
- Location: Hong Kong, China
- President: Louis Koo
- Website: HKPAG

The Hong Kong Performing Artistes Guild (HKPAG; Chinese: 香港演藝人協會) is a non-profit labour association that represents Hong Kong artistes, canto-pop singers and stage performers. As a member of International Society for the Performing Arts its main aims are to improve entertainment industry standards as well as to protect and promote artistes’ rights. Today the guild represents over 900 performers including Andy Lau, Eason Chan and Josephine Siao. In 2014 founding member Jackie Chan took over from Eric Tsang as chairman. In 2018 Louis Koo succeeded the position of President of the guild.

== History ==
On 11 August 1993 actors Jackie Chan, Eric Tsang, Anita Mui gathered together along with close to a hundred of the Hong Kong Academy for Performing Arts workers to set up an organisation which would belong to the members of the Hong Kong Academy for Performing Arts. That night, they also elected temporary members of the preparatory committee, which include, Jackie Chan, Michael Hui, Chow Yun-fat as a vice president. And there are more than twenty members from different performing arts level include: Eric Tsang, Andhra respect, Money Lo, Lam Kin-ming, Wei LieGe Wenhui, Jan Lamb, Ho Kam Wah, Anita Mui, Jacky Cheung, Maggie Cheung, Sandra Ng, Yammie Lam, Danny Lee, Richard Ng, Frankie Chan, Nat Chan, Tommy Wong, Carina Lau, Chen Guo-Xin, Philip Chan, Dong Wei, Guo Xiuyun, Lvshao Ling are all extensive advisers. On 12 December the Hong Kong Performing Artistes Guild held the first session of the General Assembly at the Jubilee Sports Institute officially establishing the governing council.

== Executive committee ==
| Position | |
|---|---|
| President | Louis Koo |
| Vice President | Miu Kiu Wai; Maria Cordero; Stanley Tong; Yam Tat Wah |
| Executive Secretary | Astrid Chan Chi Ching |
