= Chung Suet Ying =

Hong Kong actress and lyricist (born 1994)

- 鍾雪瑩
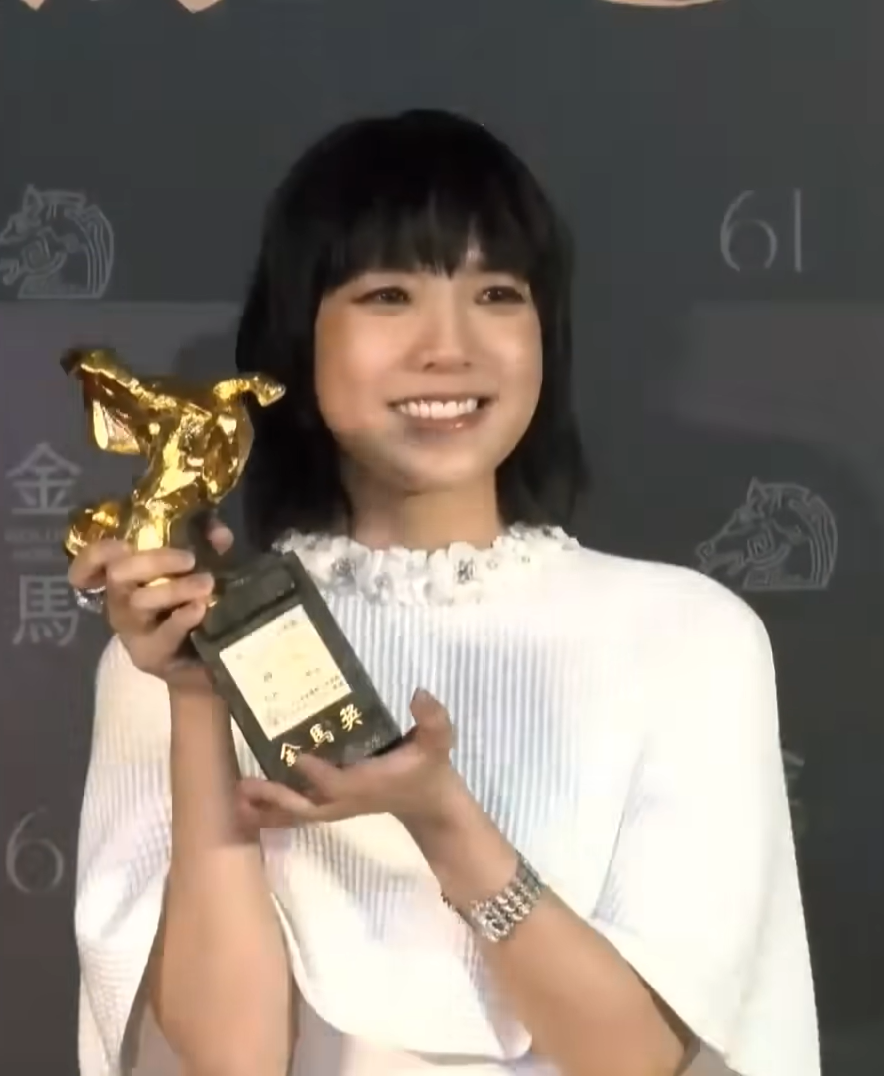
- Chung in November 2024
- Born: Chung Suet Ying; 17 December 1994 (age 31); Hong Kong
- Education: Hong Kong Baptist University (BCOMM)
- Occupations: Actress; lyricist; radio presenter
- Years active: 2019–present

Chung Suet Ying (Chinese: 鍾雪瑩; born 17 December 1994) is a Hong Kong actress, lyricist, and radio presenter. She is best known for her role as Tsz-ying in Time (2021), which earned her nominations for Best New Performer and Best Supporting Actress in the 40th Hong Kong Film Awards. She also starred in the drama film The Lyricist Wannabe (2023) and received nominations for Best Leading Actress and Best Actress in the 60th Golden Horse Awards and 42nd Hong Kong Film Awards respectively.

In 2024, Chung won the Best Leading Actress in the 61st Golden Horse Awards with the film The Way We Talk.

== Early life and education ==
Chung was born on 17 December 1994. She became interested in films and comics when she was young, especially Pixar animated movies and Hong Kong comics. She was motivated to become an actress after watching Japanese actress Fumi Nikaido's films. Chung joined Asian Millionstar 3, a talent show program hosted by Asia Television, in 2010 when she was 15 years old. She was eliminated in the round of 16. She later attended Hong Kong Baptist University (HKBU) in 2014 and featured as a background actor in Heiward Mak's 2014 romance film Uncertain Relationship Society. However, as her grades in freshman year did not meet the requirements for a film major, she chose to pursue a financial journalism major instead. Nevertheless, her passion for films persisted and she even set her graduation thesis topic related to the development of creative media. She had also attended lyrics writing classes taught by Chow Yiu-fai during her university years.

== Career ==
After graduating with a Bachelor of Communication from HKBU, Chung joined Commercial Radio Hong Kong as a production assistant of ILUB's program. In 2019, she began to host her own late night program. However, she quit the job in early 2020 to pursue a longed-for acting career. She also started her lyricist career under the pen name "Chung Said" (Chinese: 鍾說) in late 2019 and wrote Jace Chan's "Born to Be Different", Janice Vidal's "Little Miss Janice" and Joey Hung's "Dirty".

Chung landed her first onscreen role in 2019 ViuTV drama series Limited Education and received public attention. Wong Chi-yeung, the director and writer of the series, offered her the role without casting as Chung left him with a deep impression while auditioning for the 2016 drama film Weeds on Fire. In 2021, Chung was cast in lead role in the black comedy film Time, portraying an orphaned schoolgirl who forms an uncanny bonding with a retired assassin. She received nominations for Best New Performer and Best Supporting Actress in the 40th Hong Kong Film Awards with her performance. From 2021 to 2022, she also featured in lead roles in the biographical film Zero to Hero, sports film Life Must Go On and horror thriller Let It Ghost.

In 2024, Chung was cast in the lead and titular role in the drama film The Lyricist Wannabe, for which she was nominated for Best Leading Actress and Best Actress in the 60th Golden Horse Awards and 42nd Hong Kong Film Awards respectively. She also starred in The Way We Talk, which again earned her a nomination for Best Leading Actress in the 61st Golden Horse Awards, marking the second year in a row that Chung was up for the award in the Golden Horse Awards. Chung eventually won the award, which is her first major cinematic award.

== Filmography ==
=== Film ===
Year	Title	Role	Notes/Ref.
2021	The Way We Keep Dancing	Alan's girlfriend	
2021	Time	Tsz-ying (屈紫瑩)	
2021	Zero to Hero	Giu (嬌)	
2021	Anita	Anita's fan	
2022	The Sparring Partner	Cheng Ka-Man (鄭家雯)	
2022	Tales from the Occult	Mai Mai (米米)	
2022	Life Must Go On	Tsang Nok Fan (曾諾凡)	
2022	Let It Ghost	Si Si (思思)	
2023	The Lyricist Wannabe	Law Wing Sze (羅穎詩)	
2024	The Last Dance	Suey	
2024	The Way We Talk	So Yan (素恩)	

=== Television ===
Year	Title	Role	Notes/Ref.
2019	Limited Education	Bonix	Recurring role
2020	Hong Kong Love Stories	Cecili (西西利)	Guest role
2021	Generation Slash	Lam Yuen Yuen (林婉婉)	Recurring role
2024	Margaret & David Tie	Suet Yi (雪兒)	Main role

== Awards and nominations ==
Year	Award	Category	Work	Result	Ref.
2022	40th Hong Kong Film Awards	Best Supporting Actress	Time	Nominated	
2022	40th Hong Kong Film Awards	Best New Performer	Time	Nominated	
2023	60th Golden Horse Awards	Best Leading Actress	The Lyricist Wannabe	Nominated	
2024	30th Hong Kong Film Critics Society Awards	Best Actress	The Lyricist Wannabe	Nominated	
2024	2023 Hong Kong Screenwriters' Guild Awards	Best Movie Character of the Year	The Lyricist Wannabe	Nominated	
2024	42nd Hong Kong Film Awards	Best Actress	The Lyricist Wannabe	Nominated	
2024	61st Golden Horse Awards	Best Leading Actress	The Way We Talk	Won	
2025	31st Hong Kong Film Critics Society Awards	Best Actress	The Way We Talk	Nominated	
2025	43rd Hong Kong Film Awards	Best Actress	The Way We Talk	Nominated	
