= Hong Kong Will Be Destroyed After 33 Years =

2014 Hong Kong short film

- 香港將於33年後毀滅
- Production company: GVA Creative
- Release date: 3 March 2014
- Running time: 7 minutes
- Language: Cantonese

Hong Kong Will Be Destroyed After 33 Years
- Traditional Chinese: 香港將於33年後毀滅
- Simplified Chinese: 香港将于33年后毁灭
Transcriptions
Standard Mandarin
- Hanyu Pinyin: Xiānggǎng jiāng yú sānshísān nián hòu huǐmiè
Yue: Cantonese
- Jyutping: hoeng1 gong2 zoeng1 jyu1 saam1 sap6 saam1 nin4 hau6 wai2 mit6

Hong Kong Will Be Destroyed After 33 Years (Chinese: 香港將於33年後毀滅) is a Hong Kong science fiction short film produced by a studio called GVA Creative. It was released on YouTube in March 2014 and quickly went viral.

== Plot ==
The premise of the film is that a meteor has been projected to destroy Hong Kong after 33 years (i.e., in 2047). The storyline details the subsequent reaction of local residents and the transformation Hong Kong undergoes leading up to the date of destruction.

== Censorship ==
The film alludes to the changes that have taken place in the city since the 1997 transfer of sovereignty over Hong Kong from the United Kingdom to the People's Republic of China; the 2047 meteor a metaphor for the real-world expiry of the autonomy afforded to Hong Kong within the One country, two systems arrangement, and the uncertainty that follows.

The film was subsequently banned in China by the State Council Information Office, a mainland propaganda authority, who ordered the removal from all websites of "video, text, etc. that advocates the short sci-fi film about Hong Kongers ‘saving themselves’ titled Hong Kong Will Be Destroyed in 33 Years." (Chinese: 鼓吹港人"自救"的科幻短片"香港将于33年后毁灭"相关视频、文字等。) It was subsequently reported that mention of the film was suppressed on both Baidu and Sina Weibo.

A spokesperson for the film's production studio responded that authorities were "keeping people away from knowing the truth, that China is trying to suffocate Hong Kong to death by importing Mainland Chinese into Hong Kong until there’s enough people for them to control the elections. After that, there will be no open elections in Hong Kong" and that "They don’t want people to be awake. We can’t stop them, but at least we want to let the world know: we’re dying. Soon, there will be no more Hong Kongers."

== See also ==
List of TV and films with critiques of Chinese Communist Party
