= Pompo: The Cinéphile =

Japanese manga series

- Cover of Pompo: The Cinéphile volume 1 by Media Factory

映画大好きポンポさん (Eiga Daisuki Ponpo-san)
- Genre: Comedy, slice of life
- Manga
- Written by: Shogo Sugitani
- Published by: Media Factory
- English publisher: NA: Seven Seas Entertainment
- Imprint: MFC Gene Pixiv Series
- Magazine: pixiv Comic
- Original run: April 2017 – present
- Volumes: 3 + Omni.
- Manga

Fran: The Cinéphile
- Written by: Shogo Sugitani
- Published by: Media Factory
- Imprint: MFC Gene Pixiv Series
- Magazine: pixiv Comic
- Original run: July 2018 – present
- Volumes: 1
- Manga

Kāna: The Cinéphile
- Written by: Shogo Sugitani
- Published by: Media Factory
- Imprint: MFC Gene Pixiv Series
- Published: September 26, 2020
- Volumes: 1
- Manga

Mazurka: The Cinéphile
- Written by: Shogo Sugitani
- Published by: Media Factory
- Imprint: MFC Gene Pixiv Series
- Magazine: pixiv Comic
- Original run: May 2022 – present
- Volumes: 1
- Manga

Nyallywood! 2 - Alan: The Cinéphile
- Written by: Shogo Sugitani
- Published by: Media Factory
- Imprint: MFC Gene Pixiv Series
- Published: January 26, 2024
- Volumes: 1
- Anime film
- Pompo: The Cinéphile (2021)

Pompo: The Cinéphile (Japanese: 映画大好きポンポさん, Hepburn: Eiga Daisuki Ponpo-san) is a Japanese manga series by Shogo Sugitani (also known as Ningen Plamo), serialized online via pixiv Comic website since April 2017. It has been collected in four tankōbon volumes by Media Factory. A spin-off manga by Sugitani, titled Fran: The Cinéphile (映画大好きフランちゃん, Eiga Daisuki Fran-chan), began July 2018. A standalone volume, Kāna: The Cinéphile, was published September 2020. Another spin-off manga, Mazurka: The Cinéphile, started May 2022. An anime film adaptation by CLAP was released on June 4, 2021.

== Characters ==
Joelle Davidovich "Pompo" Pomponett (ポンポさん / ジョエル・ダヴィドヴィッチ・ポンポネット, Joeru Davuidovuitchi "Ponpo-san" Ponponetto)
Voiced by: Konomi Kohara (Japanese); Brianna Gentilella (English)
Gene Fini (ジーン・フィニ, Jīn Fini)
Voiced by: Hiroya Shimizu (Japanese); Christopher Trindade (English)
Nathalie Woodward (ナタリー・ウッドワード, Natarī Uddowādo)
Voiced by: Rinka Ōtani (Japanese); Jackie Lastra (English)
Mystia (ミスティア, Misutia)
Voiced by: Ai Kakuma (Japanese); Anne Yatco (English)
Martin Braddock (マーティン)
Voiced by: Akio Otsuka (Japanese); Kenneth Cavett (English)
Alan Gardner (アラン・ガードナー, Aran Gādonā)
Voiced by: Ryuichi Kijima (Japanese); Jonah Platt (English)

== Media ==
=== Manga ===
Sugitani published the manga on Pixiv in April 2017. In 2018, it was nominated for the Manga Taishō awards. Seven Seas Entertainment publishes the manga in North America. An omnibus series of short stories began February 2020.

==== Volumes ====
No.	Original release date	Original ISBN	English release date	English ISBN
1	August 26, 2017	978-4-04-069453-5	August 3, 2021	978-1-64827-561-6
2	September 27, 2018	978-4-04-065150-7	November 2, 2021	978-1-64827-565-4
omni	April 26, 2021	978-4-04-064637-4	—	—
3	May 27, 2021	978-4-04-064636-7	February 28, 2023	978-1-63858-610-4

A spin-off manga by Sugitani titled Fran: The Cinéphile (映画大好きフランちゃん, Eiga Daisuki Fran-chan) began July 2018.

No.	Japanese release date	Japanese ISBN
1	August 26, 2019	978-4-04-065151-4

A standalone volume Kāna: The Cinéphile (映画大好きカーナちゃん, Eiga Daisuki Kāna-chan) about a writer/actress friend of Fran was published in September 2020.

No.	Japanese release date	Japanese ISBN
1	September 26, 2020	978-4-04-064635-0

Another spin-off manga Mazurka: The Cinéphile (映画大好きマズルカちゃん, Eiga Daisuki Mazurka-san) about a cinematographer started in May 2022.

No.	Japanese release date	Japanese ISBN
1	February 27, 2023	978-4-04-681572-9

A volume related to Marzuka, titled Nyallywood! 2 - Alan: The Cinéphile (映画大好きアランくん, Eiga Daisuki Alan) about a bank financer was published in January 2024.

No.	Japanese release date	Japanese ISBN
1	January 26, 2024	978-4-04-683273-3

=== Anime film ===
An anime adaptation was announced on August 26, 2017, later revealed to be an anime film on September 1, 2019. The film was animated by CLAP and directed by Takayuki Hirao, with Ryoichiro Matsuo serving as producer and Shingo Adachi designing the characters. Kenta Matsukuma composed the film's music. The film was set to premiere on March 19, 2021, after being delayed from 2020. However, it was delayed again to June 4, 2021, due to the COVID-19 pandemic.

GKIDS acquired the rights to the film in North America, and have screened it in Japanese with English subtitles and an English dub in April 2022. They released the film in digital format on June 28, 2022, and in a Blu-ray Disc/DVD combo on July 12.

The film was nominated for Best Animated Feature – Independent at the 49th Annie Awards.
