= She Remembers, He Forgets =

2015 Hong Kong film by Adam Wong

- Poster
- Chinese: 哪一天我們會飛
- Directed by: Adam Wong
- Written by: Saville Chan; Adam Wong
- Screenplay by: Saville Chan; Adam Wong
- Story by: Saville Chan
- Produced by: Saville Chan
- Starring: Miriam Yeung; Jan Lamb; Cecilia So; Ng Siu-hin; Neo Yau
- Cinematography: Tam Wai-Kai
- Edited by: Poon Hung; Adam Wong
- Music by: Day Tai
- Distributed by: Media Asia Group Holdings
- Release date: 5 November 2015
- Running time: 110 minutes
- Country: Hong Kong
- Language: Cantonese
- Box office: HK$9.89 million

She Remembers, He Forgets is a 2015 Hong Kong drama film produced by Saville Chan and directed by Adam Wong and starring Miriam Yeung. It was released on 5 November 2015.

== Cast ==
- Miriam Yeung
- Jan Lamb
- Cecilia So
- Ng Siu-hin
- Neo Yau
- Ranya Lee (李敏)
- Gill Mohindepaul Singh

== Release ==
The film was one of two opening films at the 2015 Hong Kong Asian Film Festival.

== Reception ==
The film grossed HK$2.71 million on its opening weekend, behind Spectre and Our Times.

Cecilia So was nominated for Best New Performer at the 52nd Golden Horse Film Awards.
