= Super Girls (Hong Kong group) =

Hong Kong Cantopop girl group

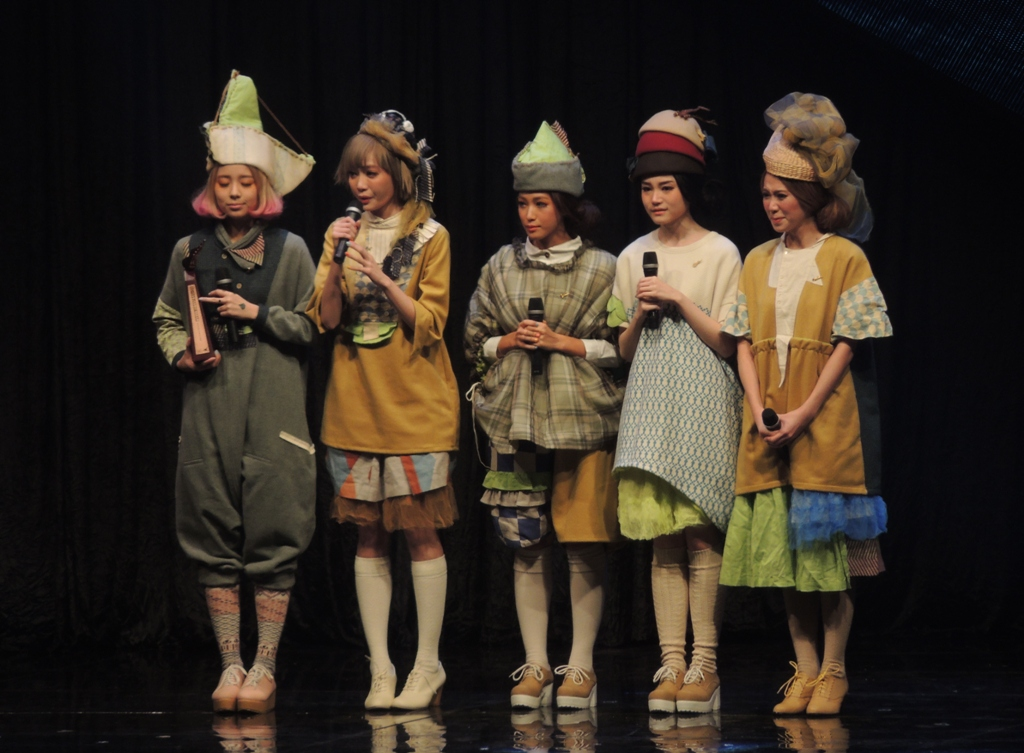

Background information
- Origin: Hong Kong
- Genre: Cantopop
- Years active: 2010–present
- Labels: Stars Shine International; JamMusic
- Members: Aka; Cheronna; Yanny; Jessica; Heidi
- Website: www.youtube.com/c/SuperGirlsGroup

Super Girls also known as Icon Girls, is a Hong Kong Cantopop girl group formed by Stars Shine International. They are managed by Jam Cast Management HK Ltd. The group has five members: Aka Chio, Heidi Lee, Yanny Chan, Cheronna Ng, and Jessica Tsoi. They disbanded in February 2022.

== Discography ==
=== Album ===
- 超女時代 (2012)

=== EP ===
- Blossom (2015)

== Filmography ==
=== Drama ===
Year	Title	Network	Member
2014	Never Dance Alone	TVB	Heidi, Cheronna
