= List of Hong Kong films of 2021 =

This article lists feature-length Hong Kong films released in 2021.

== Box office ==
The highest-grossing Hong Kong films released in 2021, by domestic box office gross revenue, are as follows:

(List of 2021 box office number-one films in Hong Kong)

Highest-grossing films released in 2021
| Rank | Title | Distributor | Domestic gross |
|---|---|---|---|
| 1 | Anita | Edko Films | HK$62,267,377 |
| 2 | Zero to Hero | One Cool Film | HK$27,412,646 |
| 3 | Raging Fire | Emperor Cinema | HK$26,353,966 |
| 4 | Shock Wave 2 | Universe Films Distribution | HK$18,921,704 |
| 5 | One Second Champion | Universal Pictures | HK$16,190,644 |

== Releases ==
| Opening | | Title | Director | Cast | Ref. |
|---|---|---|---|---|---|
| F E B | 18 | Shock Wave 2 | Herman Yau | Andy Lau, Sean Lau | |
| F E B | 18 | The Way We Keep Dancing | Adam Wong Sau Ping | Cherry Ngan, Babyjohn Choi, Lokman Yeung | The Way We Dance Cast |
| F E B | 25 | Breakout Brothers | Mak Ho-Bon | Louis Cheung, Justin Cheung, Adam Pak, Patrick Tam | |
| M A R | 4 | Keep Rolling | Man Lim-chung | Ann Hui | Documentary |
| M A R | 11 | One Second Champion | Chiu Sin-hang | Endy Chow, Chanon Santinatornkul, Chiu Sin-hang, Lin Min Chen, Lo Hoi-pang, Ben Yuen, Justin Cheung, Hung Cheuk Lok | It won Best Original Film Song at the 40th Hong Kong Film Awards |
| A P R | 1 | Ready or Knot | Anselm Chan Mou Yin | Carlos Chan, Michelle Wai, Chu Pak Hong, Hedwig Tam, Kaki Sham, Renci Yeung | |
| A P R | 1 | My Voice, My Life Revisited | Ruby Yang | | Documentary |
| A P R | 15 | I Still Remember | Ho Lik Hang | Patrick Tam, Tony Wu, Johnny Hui, Isabel Chan, Sofiee Ng | |
| A P R | 22 | All U Need Is Love | Vincent Kok | Louis Koo, Tony Leung, Eric Tsang, Francis Ng | |
| A P R | 29 | Dynasty Warriors | Chow Hin Yeung | Louis Koo, Carina Lau, Wang Kai, Tony Yang, Han Geng, Justin Cheung, Gulnazar, Ray Lui, Lam Suet, Philip Keung, Law Kar-ying, Eddie Cheung, Jonathan Wong | |
| A P R | 29 | Once Upon a Time in Hong Kong | Wong Jing, Woody Hui | Louis Koo, Tony Leung, Francis Ng, Gordon Lam | |
| M A Y | 14 | 77 Heartwarmings | Herman Yau | Charlene Choi, Pakho Chau, Mario Maurer | |
| M A Y | 27 | My Indian Boyfriend | Sri Kishore | Karan Cholia, Shirley Chan | |
| J U N | 3 | Drifting | Jun Li | Francis Ng, Rachel Lee, Tse Kwan-ho | |
| J U N | 3 | Call Me Agent | Lam Siu Kei, Michael Chuah | Mimi Chu | |
| J U N | 10 | Elisa's Day | Alan Fung | Ronald Cheng, Hanna Chan | |
| J U N | 17 | Hand Rolled Cigarette | Chan Kin-long | Gordon Lam, Binpin Karma | |
| J U N | 24 | Caught in Time | Lau Ho-Leung | Wang Qianyuan, Daniel Wu, Jessie Li, Michelle Wai, Nina Paw | |
| J U L | 15 | Time | Ricky Ko | Patrick Tse, Fung Bo-bo | Patrick Tse won Best Actor at the 40th Hong Kong Film Awards |
| A U G | 5 | Ladies Market | Wing-chung Kwan | Liu Kai-chi, Lam Suet, Chung Suet Ying | |
| A U G | 5 | Coffin Homes | Fruit Chan | Wong You Nam, Loletta Lee, Siu Yam-yam | |
| A U G | 12 | Zero to Hero | Jimmy Wan | Sandra Ng, Leung Chung-hang, Louis Cheung, Mason Fung | A biographical film about medal-winning Paralympian So Wa Wai. Fung Ho Yeung won Best Supporting Actor at the 40th Hong Kong Film Awards. |
| A U G | 19 | Raging Fire | Benny Chan | Donnie Yen, Nicholas Tse | It won Best Film, Best Director, Best Film Editing and Best Action Choreography at the 40th Hong Kong Film Awards. |
| S E P | 22 | P.T.G.F | Terry Cheng Fung Lam | Chiu Sin-hang, Larine Tang, Chun Chor Ying (Nami), Ngan Minghon Charlie, Kaki Sham, Cheung Pui Lok, Kiwi Ching, Kwok Yik Sum, Justin Cheung, Rose Ma | |
| O C T | 16 | Kungfu Stuntmen | Junzi Wei | | Documentary |
| O C T | 28 | Madalena | Emily Chan | Louis Cheung, Chrissie Chau | |
| O C T | 28 | The Attorney | Wong Kwok Fai | Alex Fong, Patrick Tam, Carlos Chan, Liu Kai-Chi, Justin Cheung, Nina Paw, Jeana Ho, Kenneth Tsang, Himmy Wong | |
| N O V | 5 | Anita | Longman Leung | Louise Wong, Terrance Lau, Fish Liew, Louis Koo, Lam Ka Tung, Miriam Yeung, Yo Yang | A biographical film about singer Anita Mui. It won Best Supporting Actress (Fish Liew), Best New Performer (Louise Wong), Best Costume & Make Up Design, Best Visual Effects and Best Sound Design at the 40th Hong Kong Film Awards. |
| N O V | 25 | Showbiz Spy | Keian Chui | Anson Lo, Chloe So, Heidi Lee, Alina Lee, Summer Chan | MIRROR's Anson Lo first film. Chloe So was former member of girl group "As One". Heidi Lee was former member of girl group "Super Girls". |
| N O V | 25 | The First Girl I Loved | Yeung Chiu Hoi Candy Ng Wing-Shan | Hedwig Tam, Renci Yeung, Stephen Au, Teresa Mak | Lesbian film |
| D E C | 31 | G Storm | David Lam | Louis Koo, Julian Cheung, Kevin Cheng | |

== See also ==
- 2021 in Hong Kong
- List of 2021 box office number-one films in Hong Kong
- List of Hong Kong films of 2022
- 40th Hong Kong Film Awards
