= List of 2021 box office number-one films in Hong Kong =

This is a list of films which placed number-one at the Weekly box office in Hong Kong during 2021.

== Number-one films ==
†	This implies the highest-grossing movie of the year.

#	Date	Film	Gross
1	3 January 2021	Box office closed due to the COVID-19 pandemic.	
2	10 January 2021	Box office closed due to the COVID-19 pandemic.	
3	17 January 2021	Box office closed due to the COVID-19 pandemic.	
4	24 January 2021	Box office closed due to the COVID-19 pandemic.	
5	31 January 2021	Box office closed due to the COVID-19 pandemic.	
6	7 February 2021	Box office closed due to the COVID-19 pandemic.	
7	14 February 2021	Box office closed due to the COVID-19 pandemic.	
8	21 February 2021	Shock Wave 2	US$827,334
9	28 February 2021	Shock Wave 2	US$850,633
10	7 March 2021	Soul	US$707,785
11	14 March 2021	Soul	US$695,568
12	21 March 2021	One Second Champion	US$479,518
13	28 March 2021	Godzilla vs. Kong †	US$1,716,813
13	4 April 2021	Godzilla vs. Kong †	US$1,654,612
14	11 April 2021	Stand by Me Doraemon 2	US$928,628
15	18 April 2021	Seo Bok	US$340,836
16	25 April 2021	Seo Bok	US$185,086
17	2 May 2021	Dynasty Warriors	US$378,458
18	9 May 2021	Dynasty Warriors	US$285,777
19	16 May 2021	77 Heartwarmings	US$209,687

== Highest-grossing films ==
International film

Hong Kong film

Highest-grossing films of 2021 (In-year releases)
Rank	Title	Distributor	Domestic gross
1	Spider-Man: No Way Home	Sony Pictures	HK$120.71 million (US$15.54 million)
2	Shang-Chi and the Legend of the Ten Rings	Walt Disney Pictures	HK$63.1 million (US$8.12 million)
3	Anita	Edko Films	HK$62.4 million (US$8.03 million)
4	No Time to Die	Universal Pictures	HK$53.84 million (US$6.93 million)
5	Eternals	Walt Disney Pictures	HK$50.4 million (US$6.49 million)
6	Black Widow	Walt Disney Pictures	HK$49.28 million (US$6.34 million)
7	Godzilla vs. Kong	Universal Pictures	HK$34.61 million (US$4.45 million)
8	F9	Universal Pictures	HK$32.59 million (US$4.19 million)
9	Venom: Let There Be Carnage	Sony Pictures	HK$28.11 million (US$3.62 million)
10	Zero to Hero	One Cool Film	HK$27.4 million (US$3.53 million)

== See also ==
- List of Hong Kong films of 2021
- List of 2022 box office number-one films in Hong Kong
