= Mason Fung =

Hong Kong actor (born 2004)

- 馮皓揚
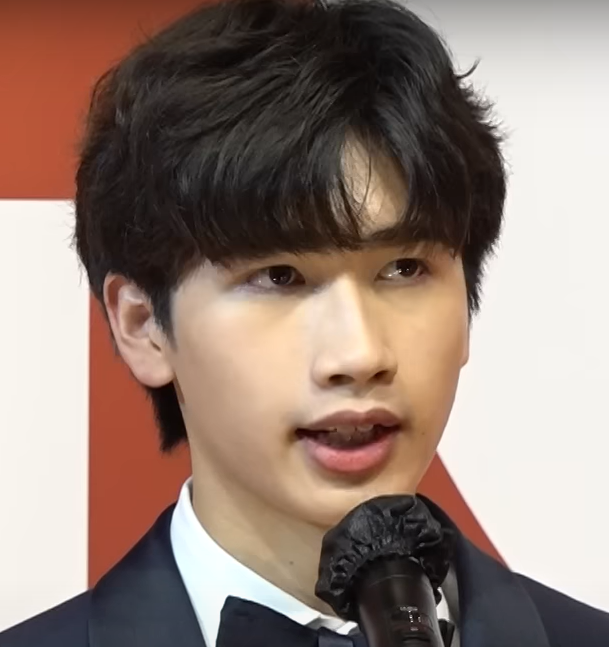
- Fung in July 2022
- Born: Fung Ho-yeung; 2004 (age 21–22); Hong Kong
- Occupation: Actor
- Years active: 2019–present

Mason Fung Ho-yeung (Chinese: 馮皓揚; born 2004) is a Hong Kong actor best known for portraying So Wa-wai in the biographical film Zero to Hero (2021), for which he won Best Supporting Actor in the 40th Hong Kong Film Awards.

== Early life ==
Fung was born in 2004. He trained in Choy Li Fut with his grandfather from a young age. Diagnosed with Asperger syndrome and ADHD during primary school, he struggled with speaking and faced bullying due to his condition. To help improve his speaking skills, Fung's mother enrolled him in an acting school when he was 13, although she did not initially intend for him to pursue acting. He then attended Baptist Lui Ming Choi Secondary School. After taking acting classes for a year, Fung auditioned for Zero to Hero. In November 2021, after winning a Hong Kong Film Award, he decided to drop out of school in Form 5 to pursue a full-time acting career.

== Career ==
Fung made his debut as a child actor when he was in Form 3, playing the younger version of Edward Ma's character in the 2019 sports film We Are Legends. He also began shooting advertisements and music videos, including the music video for Hins Cheung's "Prodigy 1985". At the age of 15, Fung shared a lead role with Leung Chung-hang as the younger version of So Wa-wai, an Paralympic-winning athlete, in the biographical film Zero to Hero. Allan Hunter of Screen Daily praised Fung's performance, noting his ability to convey "a warm sense of [So Wa Wai's] irrepressible charm, modesty, and determination"; while Hui Yuk-man of HK01 commended Fung's portrayal of innocence as "so convincing that it seemed innate rather than acted", especially considering his young age. He won Best Supporting Actor and received a nomination for Best New Performer in the 40th Hong Kong Film Awards for this role.

In July 2022, following his win at the Hong Kong Film Awards, Fung announced his intention to join the TVB's Artiste Training Class to enhance his oral and presentation skills. However, he quit the class after the first day in September, explaining that the teaching methods did not meet his expectations and he did not find the class helpful for his career. He also appeared in a supporting role in the 2022 crime film A Murder Erased, followed by a role as the younger version of Hubert Wu in the TVB series Hello Missfortune. In 2024, he received a starring role as the autistic brother of Venus Wong in the TVB crime series Forensic Heroes VI: Redemption. He is also set to star in Donnie Yen's upcoming action film The Prosecutor.

== Filmography ==
=== Film ===
Year	Title	Role	Notes/Ref.
2019	We Are Legends	Young Jack	
2021	Zero to Hero	Young So Wa-wai	
2022	A Murder Erased	Wu Tsun-tung (胡俊彤)	
2024	The Prosecutor	Ma Ka-kit (馬家杰)	

=== Television ===
Year	Title	Role	Notes/Ref.
2021	Hello Missfortune	Young Chan Pei-ho (陳北河)	Recurring role
2024	Forensic Heroes VI: Redemption	Fok Bo-lok (霍寶樂)	Main role

== Awards and nominations ==
Year	Award	Category	Work	Result	Ref.
2022	40th Hong Kong Film Awards	Best Supporting Actor	Zero to Hero	Won	
2022	40th Hong Kong Film Awards	Best New Performer	Zero to Hero	Nominated	
