= Leung Chung Hang =

Leung Chung Hang, or Leung Chung-hang, may refer to:

- Baggio Leung, Hong Kong activist and politician
- Leung Chung-hang (actor), Hong Kong actor
