= Time (2021 film) =

2021 Hong Kong film by Ricky Ko

- Theatrical poster
- Traditional Chinese: 殺出個黃昏
- Literal meaning: Fighting Until the Dusk
- Jyutping: Saat^{3} Ceot^{1} Go^{3} Wong^{4} Fan^{1}
- Directed by: Ricky Ko
- Screenplay by: Gordon Lam; Pinky Ho
- Produced by: Gordon Lam; Kevin Tse
- Starring: Patrick Tse; Petrina Fung; Lam Suet; Chung Suet Ying
- Cinematography: Jam Yau; David Cheung
- Edited by: Yeung Kai-Wing
- Music by: Tommy Wai
- Production companies: Sunny Side Up Culture; Fei Fan Entertainment
- Distributed by: Edko Films
- Release dates: 4 April 2021 (HKIFF); 15 July 2021 (Hong Kong)
- Running time: 100 minutes
- Country: Hong Kong
- Language: Cantonese
- Box office: HK$4.37 million

Time (Chinese: 殺出個黃昏) is a 2021 Hong Kong black comedy film directed by Ricky Ko and co-written by Gordon Lam and Pinky Ho. Starring Patrick Tse, Petrina Fung, Lam Suet, and Chung Suet Ying, the film follows a retired killer (Tse) who returns to business by providing euthanasia to the suffering elderly, and finds a new life purpose through an encounter with an orphaned young client (Chung).

Conceived by writer Pinky Ho in 2014, the screenplay was initially rejected by multiple production companies before actor Gordon Lam attached himself to the project as co-writer, producer, and major investor, marking Lam's screenwriting debut. The duo spent four years rewriting the screenplay, before Lam invited Ricky Ko to helm the project. Filming commenced in September 2019 and wrapped in October, with post-production taking place in Hong Kong and Malaysia.

The film premiered at the 45th Hong Kong International Film Festival on 4 April 2021, followed by a theatrical release in Hong Kong on 15 July. It won three awards in the 28th Hong Kong Film Critics Society Awards, and received five nominations in the 40th Hong Kong Film Awards, with Patrick Tse winning Best Actor, making him the oldest recipient of the award.

== Plot ==
In the 1950s, Chau, along with his partners Fung and Chung, are a formidable team of triad contract killers who successfully wipe out a gang of rival thugs at the fruit market. As time passes, the team has already retired, and Chau is working as a chef in a noodle shop. However, his boss fires him after purchasing a robot to replace his job.

Chau is approached by Fung, who invites him to meet up with her and Chung. Over the years, Fung has amassed a sizable fortune working as a lounge singer and operator of a popular cabaret but has a falling out with her son after he demands she sell her home and business to finance the purchase of a mansion in the prestigious Kowloon Tong district so he can put her grandson in a prestigious school. Chung, an unemployed deliveryman, has fallen in love with a young prostitute named Ching Ching. At Fung's suggestion, Chau and Chung agree to come out of retirement.

The team soon receives a new contract, but when Chau arrives, he finds the client is an old man who hires him to euthanize his terminally ill wife to end her suffering. Chau refuses, but that night, he sees on the news that the old man has murdered his wife himself and is arrested by the police. Sympathetic to the suffering elderly, Chau proposes to his partners that they provide euthanasia services, and the team soon rebrands themselves as "Elderly's Angels".

In one contract, Chau arrives to find only an orphaned young girl named Tsz-ying, who reveals she is the client. Chau is dissatisfied with her request, as his services were intended for the elderly, and when Tsz-ying tries to live stream her euthanasia process, Chau furiously grabs her phone and leaves. Tsz-ying then tails Chau home with her phone's GPS function and asks him to train her as a killer. Over time, Chau relents, realizing they are both lonely and seeking familial warmth. Meanwhile, Fung is forcibly institutionalized after her son forges her signature on documents selling her property. Chung proposes to marry Ching Ching, but she rejects him as being too old for her. Shocked, Chung has a heart attack and winds up in the hospital.

Chau convinces his partners to kidnap Tsz-ying's ex-boyfriend Bun, a gangster who impregnated and then abandoned her, and forces Bun to promise to take care of the baby. After releasing Bun, Fung returns to the nursing home of her own will, while Chung sells his van after learning Ching Ching is getting married in Macau and gives the money to her as a blessing. Chau is then ambushed by Bun's gang, managing to fight them off. Realizing that Bun has lied about his repentance and has pressured Tsz-ying into having an abortion, Chau contacts Fung for help. They manage to rescue her from an underground abortion clinic, but when they try to fight their way out, they run into the police. Chung sacrifices himself to pin down the policemen, allowing Chau to reunite with Tsz-ying.

At the end, Chau visits Chung in prison, who is content with no longer having to worry about money and medical attention. Fung continues to perform as a singer in the elderly home, and Tsz-ying gives birth to the baby, which she raises together with Chau.

== Cast ==
- Patrick Tse as Chau, a retired contract killer who works in a modest noodle shop
  - Lam Yiu-sing as young Chau
- Petrina Fung as Fung, Chau's former accomplice and cleaner who becomes a lounge singer
  - Stephanie Ho as young Fung
- Lam Suet as Chung, Chau's former accomplice and getaway driver who falls in love with a prostitute
  - Calvert Fu as young Chung
- Chung Suet Ying as Tsz-ying, an orphaned school-girl and Chau's latest client

Also appearing in the film are Sam Lee and JJ Jia as Fung's son and daughter-in-law; Belinda Yan as Ching Ching, Chung's favourite prostitute; Zeno Koo as Chan Bun, Tsz-ying's ex-boyfriend; and Law Wing-cheung as an underground abortionist. Cameo appearances in the film include Chow Chung as a terminally-ill billionaire, as well as YouTubers Hui Yin and So Chi Ho as thugs employed by Bun to ambush Chau.

== Production ==
=== Development ===
Writer Pinky Ho conceived of a screenplay about the challenges faced by the elderly in their retirement life in 2014, based on personal experiences between her and her parents. Ho pitched the screenplay to several production companies, but it was rejected due to the lack of interest in an elderly-themed film. In the same year, Ho became acquainted with actor Gordon Lam and showed him the screenplay, who expressed interest in it. Lam proposed rewriting the theme as examining the elderly problems and social issues in Hong Kong and changed the whole storyboard, attaching himself to the project as co-writer and producer, marking Lam's screenwriting debut. Lam also acted as the major investor of the film to reduce creative constraints.

The duo spent four years penning the screenplay, making over thirty drafts, with Ho finalizing a version that Lam found satisfactory while he was filming in mainland China. Lam invited Ricky Ko to helm the project as director while filming on the set of The White Storm 2: Drug Lords (2019), where Ko was intending to pitch an original screenplay to Lam. Lam also invited Patrick Tse and Petrina Fung to star in the project, both of whom had stayed out of showbiz and had not co-starred together for over sixty years. Lam cast Tse for his resemblance to Chau's character traits in real life; he also flew to Malaysia to persuade Fung to come out of retirement. The film's production commencement was teased by Lam in June 2019, and was officially announced in September 2019, with Lam Suet, Chung Suet Ying, JJ Jia, Sam Lee, Stephanie Ho, Belinda Yan, and Zeno Koo revealed as part of the cast. Retired actor Chow Chung was announced to have a cameo appearance in November.

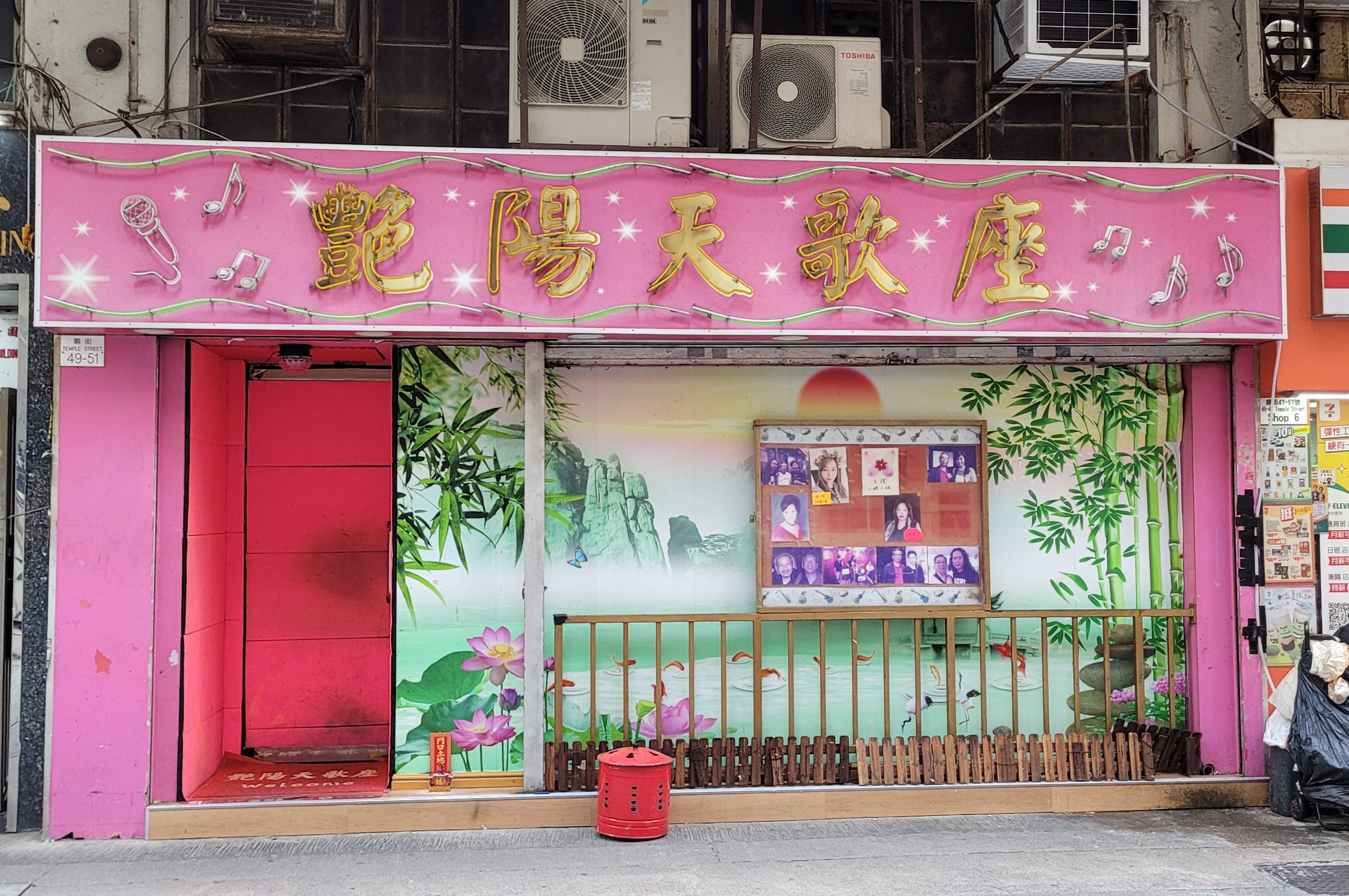
Yim Yeung Tin Night Club, a recurring filming location, located on Temple Street, Yau Ma Tei.

=== Filming ===
Principal photography began on 27 September 2019 in Yau Ma Tei, with scenes shot at Yau Ma Tei Fruit Market and Yim Yeung Tin Night Club. Location shooting also took place in Sai Wan on 4 October, with Patrick Tse, Petrina Fung, Lam Suet, Ricky Ko, and Gordon Lam spotted on set, which included filming the ending scene in Sai Ying Pun, as well as in Catchick Street. Chau's residence in his post-retirement life was shot at Sha Tau Kok. Filming wrapped up in late October.

=== Post-production ===
Editing commenced prior to Christmas 2019, and continued through mid-January 2020. Post-production was initially planned to take place in Malaysia in March, but was postponed due to the COVID-19 pandemic. It was then rescheduled to after producer and writer Gordon Lam had finished filming for Hand Rolled Cigarette (2020), and spanned across November. The film was announced with a scheduled premiere date, along with the release of the official trailer, in March 2021.

The film's theme song "Embrace Youth" is composed by Tomy Wai with lyrics written by Gordon Lam, and performed by Li Lai Ha, who was also a lounge singer prior to entering showbiz. Deanie Ip's "Weary" was also featured, covered by Petrina Fung.

== Release ==
Time premiered at the 45th Hong Kong International Film Festival on 4 April 2021, followed by early screenings on 20 June (Father's Day), and was released theatrically on 15 July in Hong Kong. The film had its European premiere at the 50th International Film Festival Rotterdam, and was also screened at the 25th Fantasia International Film Festival, 20th New York Asian Film Festival, and 23rd Far East Film Festival, with the film winning the Audience Award for Asian Feature at Fantasia.

== Reception ==
=== Box office ===
Time grossed over HK$1 million within three days of its release, and reached HK$1.5 million in its opening weekend. The film went on to accumulate HK$3 million in revenue by the second week, and eventually concluded its theatrical run with a total box office gross of HK$4.37 million.

=== Critical response ===
Edmund Lee of South China Morning Post gave Time 3.5/5 stars, describing it as "a surprisingly pleasant genre hybrid" that morphs from a "pitch-black comedy on the subject of assisted suicide for the elderly into a heart-warming drama", examining the themes of family bonds and friendship, while also noting the film's strong nostalgic vibes due to the unusual casting choices for 1960s stars Patrick Tse and Petrina Fung. Lee also ranked the film fifth out of the 32 Hong Kong films theatrically released in 2021. Ard Vijn of Screen Anarchy considered the film as an easy-on-the-eyes Hong Kong comedy drama, despite no new reflective insights or engaging characters which never quite reaches the depth of its themes, it remains mostly a schmaltzy crowd-pleaser with compelling performances from veteran actors Patrick Tse, Petrina Fung, and most particularly Lam Suet.

Sek Kei, reviewing for The Stand News, considers the film a commendable effort with solid performances by veteran actors Patrick Tse and Petrina Fung, as it addresses elderly-related social issues and features well-thought-out details, though some plotlines are deemed far-fetched and unrealistic. James Au, writing for Apple Daily, praised the film as a highly entertaining and genre-blending dark comedy that explores the plight of the elderly in Hong Kong with strong nostalgic appeal due to the casting of veteran actors, despite its grim subject matter.

Chan Wing-sze of HK01 complimented the film for delving into the generational conflicts and the problems faced by the elderly in Hong Kong with a light-hearted and humorous approach, while delivering an uplifting message and encouragement to find life purposes. Cheung Nok of Sing Tao Daily also lauded the film for its clever blend of dark humor and sensitivity that reflects the older generation's struggles, anchored by the strong performances of the veteran cast.

Hong Kong Film Critics Society described the film as a passionate effort of an intergenerational cast and crew, featuring a stereotype-breaking and creative exploration through a blend of traditional Hong Kong storytelling and modern sensibilities.

== Awards and nominations ==
Year	Award	Category	Nominee	Result	Ref.
2022	28th Hong Kong Film Critics Society Awards	Best Film	—N/a	Nominated	
2022	28th Hong Kong Film Critics Society Awards	Best Screenplay	Gordon Lam, Pinky Ho	Won	
2022	28th Hong Kong Film Critics Society Awards	Best Actor	Patrick Tse	Won	
2022	28th Hong Kong Film Critics Society Awards	Best Actress	Chung Suet Ying	Nominated	
2022	28th Hong Kong Film Critics Society Awards	Film of Merit	—N/a	Won	
2022	Hong Kong Screenwriters' Guild Awards 2021	Best Movie Character of the Year	Patrick Tse, Lam Yiu-sing	Won	
2022	Hong Kong Screenwriters' Guild Awards 2021	Best Screenplay	Gordon Lam, Pinky Ho	Won	
2022	40th Hong Kong Film Awards	Best Screenplay	Gordon Lam, Pinky Ho	Nominated	
2022	40th Hong Kong Film Awards	Best Actor	Patrick Tse	Won	
2022	40th Hong Kong Film Awards	Best Supporting Actor	Lam Suet	Nominated	
2022	40th Hong Kong Film Awards	Best Supporting Actress	Chung Suet Ying	Nominated	
2022	40th Hong Kong Film Awards	Best New Performer	Chung Suet Ying	Nominated	
2022	18th Hong Kong Film Directors' Guild Awards	Best Actor	Patrick Tse	Won	

Patrick Tse, who won the Hong Kong Film Award for Best Actor at the age of 85, is the oldest recipient of the award to date.
