= Hong Kong Film Award for Best Visual Effects =

Annual Chinese film award

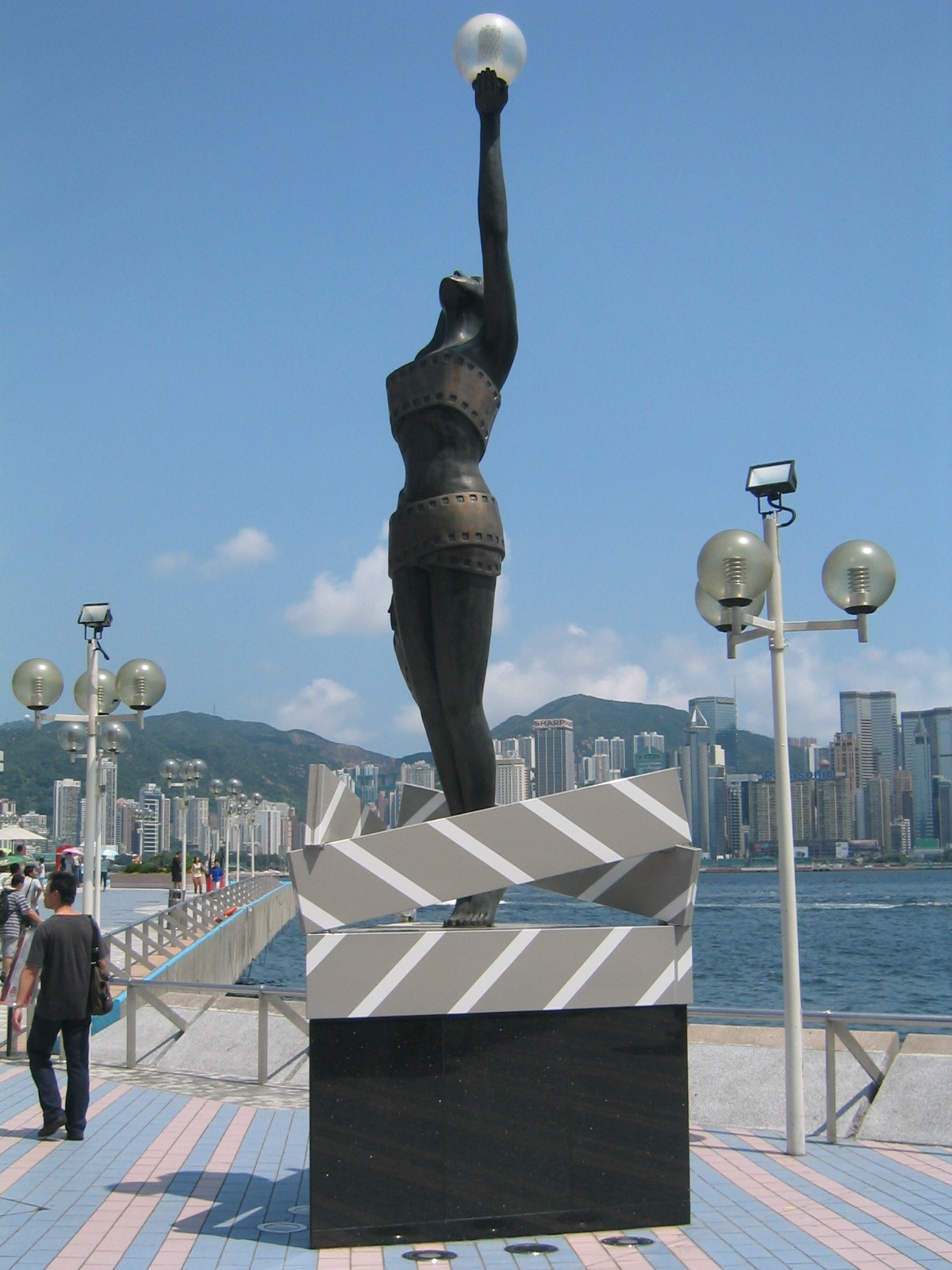
- Avenue of stars
- Country: Hong Kong
- Presented by: Hong Kong Film Awards
- Currently held by: Yee Kwok Leung; Garrett K Lam; Raymond Leung Wai Man; Hung Man Shi Candy; (2022)

The Hong Kong Film Award for Best Visual Effects is an award presented annually at the Hong Kong Film Awards for a film with the best visual effects. As of 2016 the current winners are Jason H. Snell, Ellen Poon and Bingbing Tang for Monster Hunt.

== Winners and nominees ==
Table key
| ‡ | Indicates the winner |

| Year | Nominee | Film | Note |
|---|---|---|---|
| 2022 (40th) | Yee Kwok Leung, Garrett K Lam, Raymond Leung Wai Man, Hung Man Shi Candy‡ | Anita‡ | |
| 2022 (40th) | Yee Kwok Leung, Garrett K Lam, Chiu Tak Piu, Loki Ho | Shock Wave 2 | |
| 2022 (40th) | Tsui Hark, Dennis Yeung, Wang Lei | The Battle at Lake Changjin | |
| 2022 (40th) | Raymond Leung Wai Man, Lim Hung Fung Alex, Diu King Wai, Hung Man Shi Candy | Raging Fire | |
| 2022 (40th) | Garrett K Lam, Ho Man Lok, Diu King Wai | Limbo | |
