= Love After Love (2020 film) =

- Film poster
- Traditional Chinese: 第一爐香
- Simplified Chinese: 第一炉香
- Hanyu Pinyin: Dì yī lú xiāng
- Directed by: Ann Hui
- Written by: Wang Anyi
- Based on: Aloeswood Incense: The First Brazier by Eileen Chang
- Produced by: Ann Hui
- Starring: Ma Sichun; Faye Yu; Eddie Peng; Chang Chun-ning; Fan Wei
- Cinematography: Christopher Doyle
- Edited by: Kwong Chi-leung; Mary Stephen
- Music by: Ryuichi Sakamoto
- Production companies: Alibaba Pictures; Blue Bird Film; HeHe Pictures
- Distributed by: Fortissimo Films
- Release dates: 8 September 2020 (77th Venice International Film Festival); 22 October 2021 (Mainland China); 25 November 2021 (Hong Kong)
- Running time: 144 minutes
- Country: China
- Language: Mandarin
- Box office: ¥64 million

Love After Love (Chinese: 第一炉香) is a 2020 Chinese romantic drama film directed by Ann Hui, and starring Ma Sichun, Faye Yu, Eddie Peng, Chang Chun-ning and Fan Wei. The film had its world premiere at the 77th Venice International Film Festival on September 8, 2020. It was released theatrically in China on October 22, 2021.

The film marked the third time Hui directed an Eileen Chang adaptation (following 1984's Love In A Fallen City and 1997's Eighteen Springs). It is an adaption of Chang's novella Aloeswood Incense: The First Brazier, a sprawling love story set in 1940s Hong Kong.

== Synopsis ==
The story is set shortly before World War II. Ge Weilong is a young girl who travels from Shanghai to Hong Kong in pursuit of education, but ends up working for her aunt seducing rich and powerful men.

== Cast ==
- Ma Sichun as Ge Weilong
- Faye Yu as Aunt Liang
- Eddie Peng as Qiao Qiqiao (George Qiao)
- Janine Chang as Ni'er
- Fan Wei as Situ Xie
- Zhang Jianing as Sui Sui
- Yin Fang as Lu Zhaolin
- Isabella Leong as Ji Jie
- Paul Chun as Sir Qiao Cheng
- Michelle Bai as Mrs Xin
- Wu Yanshu

== Music ==
The film's soundtrack was composed by Ryuichi Sakamoto.

== Release ==
The film had its world premiere at the 77th Venice International Film Festival on September 8, 2020. It also screened at the 25th Busan International Film Festival on October 23, 2020, and at the 33rd Tokyo International Film Festival on October 31, 2020.

== Awards and nominations ==
Year	Ceremony	Category	Recipient	Results	Ref(s)
2022	40th Hong Kong Film Awards	Best Cinematography	Christopher Doyle, Kubbie Tsoi	Nominated	
2022	40th Hong Kong Film Awards	Best Art Direction	Zhao Hai	Nominated	
2022	40th Hong Kong Film Awards	Best Costume Make Up Design	Emi Wada	Nominated	
2022	40th Hong Kong Film Awards	Best Original Film Score	Ryuichi Sakamoto	Won	
