= Hong Kong Film Award for Best Editing =

Annual Chinese film award

- Country: Hong Kong
- Presented by: Hong Kong Film Awards
- First award: 1983
- Currently held by: Curran Pang — Raging Fire (2022)

The Hong Kong Film Award for Best Editing is an award presented annually at the Hong Kong Film Awards for best editing in a Hong Kong film. As of 2018 the current holder is Li Ka Wing for Chasing The Dragon.

== Winners and nominees ==
Table key
‡	Indicates the winner

Year	Nominee	Film	Note
2020 (39th)	Cheung Ka Fai‡	Ip Man 4: The Finale‡	
2020 (39th)	Zhang Yibo	Better Days	
2020 (39th)	Law Wing Cheong, Kelvin Chau	A Witness Out of the Blue	
2020 (39th)	William Chang Suk Ping, Nose Chan Chui Hing	Suk Suk	
2020 (39th)	William Chang Suk Ping, Peter Chung	My Prince Edward	
2022 (40th)	Curran Pang‡	Raging Fire‡	
2022 (40th)	William Chang, Alan Lo	Hand Rolled Cigarette	
2022 (40th)	Chung Wai Chiu	Shock Wave 2	
2022 (40th)	Mak Chi Sin, Li Dianshi, He Yongyi	The Battle at Lake Changjin	
2022 (40th)	David Richardson	Limbo	
2023 (41st)	J.Him Lee, Zhang Zhao, Jojo Shek‡	The Sparring Partner‡	
2023 (41st)	Wong Hoi, Kenny Luk	Warriors of Future	
2023 (41st)	David Richardson, Allen Leung	Detective vs Sleuths	
2023 (41st)	William Kwok, Nose Chan	To My Nineteen-Year-Old Self	
2023 (41st)	Cheung Ka-fai, Cheng Wai-lun	Table for Six	
2024 (42nd)	Lo Wai-lun	In Broad Daylight	
2024 (42nd)	Keith Chan Hiu Chun, Nick Cheuk	Time Still Turns the Pages	
2024 (42nd)	Allen Leung, David Richardson‡	Mad Fate‡	
2024 (42nd)	William Chang, Curran Pang	The Goldfinger	
2024 (42nd)	Chan Ki-hop	A Guilty Conscience	
2025 (43rd)	Cheung Ka-fai‡	Twilight of the Warriors: Walled In‡	
2025 (43rd)	Jojo Shek	Papa	
2025 (43rd)	Robin Lee	Four Trails	
2025 (43rd)	William Chang, Curran Pang	The Last Dance	
2025 (43rd)	Li Ka-wing	The Prosecutor	
2026 (44th)	Derek Hui, Joe Zhou, To To	Ciao UFO	
2026 (44th)	William Chang‡	Sons of the Neon Night‡	
2026 (44th)	Zhang Yibo	The Shadow's Edge	
2026 (44th)	Wong Hoi, Kenny Lok	Back to the Past	
2026 (44th)	William Chang, Zhang Yibo	She's Got No Name	
