= Hong Kong Film Award for Best Art Direction =

Annual Chinese film award

- Country: Hong Kong
- Presented by: Hong Kong Film Awards
- Currently held by: Kenneth Mak; Renee Wong (2022)

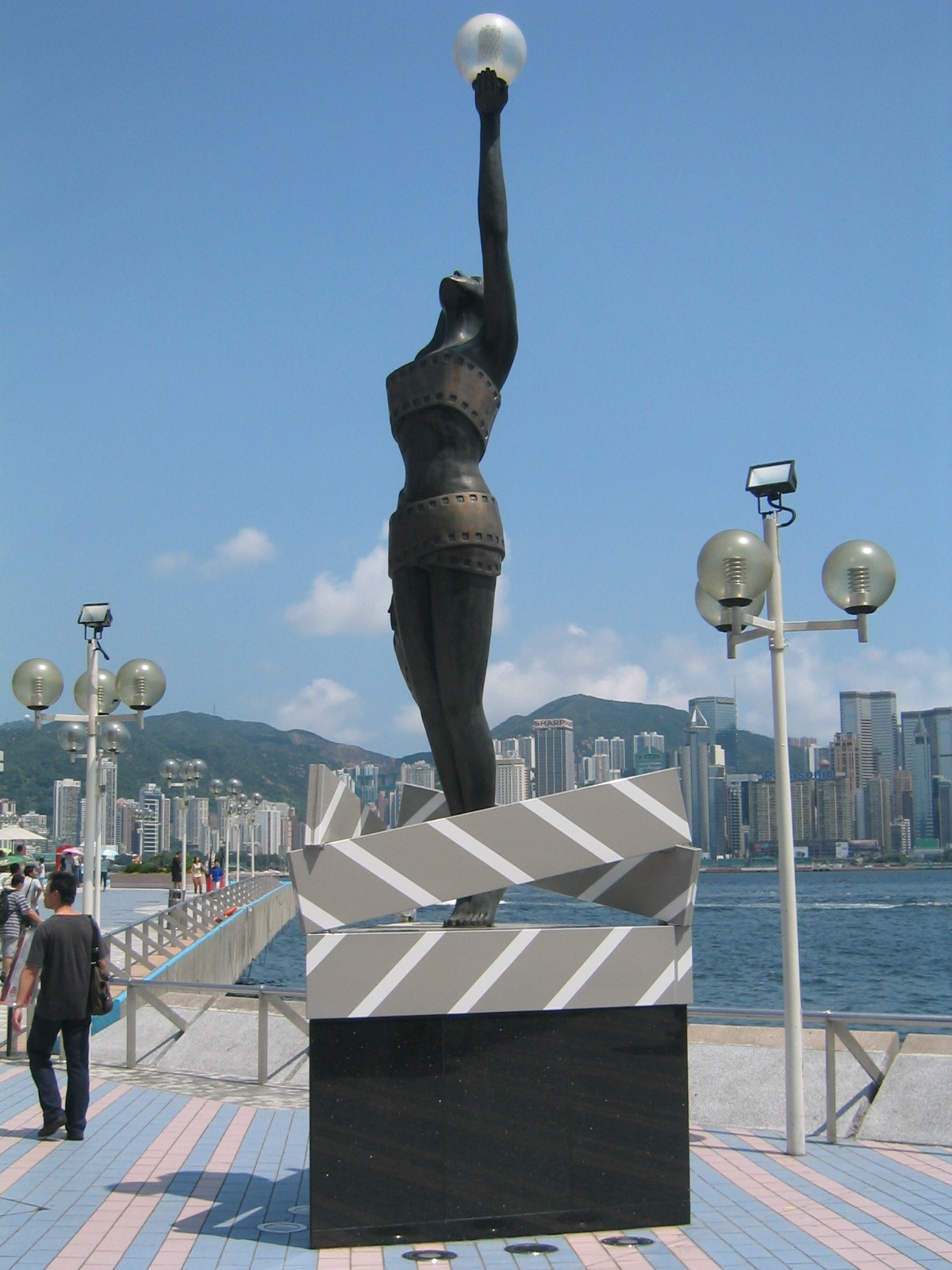
The Avenue of Stars at Tsim Sha Tsui, Hong Kong.

The Hong Kong Film Award for Best Art Direction is an award presented annually at the Hong Kong Film Awards for the best art direction in a Hong Kong film. As of 2016, the current winners are William Chang and Alfred Yau for Office.

== Winners and nominees ==
Table key
‡	Indicates the winner

Year	Nominee	Film	Note
2022 (40th)	Kenneth Mak, Renee Wong‡	Limbo‡	
2022 (40th)	Cheung Siu Hong, Yman Yiu	Hand Rolled Cigarette	
2022 (40th)	Pater Wong	Anita	
2022 (40th)	Zhao Hai	'Love After Love	
2022 (40th)	Albert Poon Yick Sum	Drifting	
