= List of 2022 box office number-one films in Hong Kong =

This is a list of films which placed number-one at the Weekly box office in Hong Kong during 2022.

== Number-one films ==
†	This implies the highest-grossing movie of the year.

#	Date	Film	Weekend gross HK$	Total gross HK$	Ref.
1	9 January 2022	Spider-Man: No Way Home	$3,163,180	$120,546,024	
2 to 15	16 January 2022 to 17 April 2022	Hong Kong cinemas were closed by the government due to the COVID-19 fifth wave from 7 January until 20 April 2022.			
16	24 April 2022	Fantastic Beasts: The Secrets of Dumbledore	$9,964,906	$9,964,906	
17	1 May 2022	The Batman	$9,971,787	$10,030,187	
18	8 May 2022	Doctor Strange in the Multiverse of Madness	$30,043,010	$30,043,010	
19	15 May 2022	Doctor Strange in the Multiverse of Madness	$23,316,718	$53,359,728	
20	22 May 2022	Doctor Strange in the Multiverse of Madness	$7,176,858	$60,536,586	
21	29 May 2022	Top Gun: Maverick	$16,903,278	$21,986,287	
22	5 June 2022	Jurassic World Dominion	$21,570,098	$21,570,098	
23	12 June 2022	Top Gun: Maverick	$16,005,462	$58,304,020	
24	19 June 2022	Top Gun: Maverick	$12,081,640	$70,406,190	
25	26 June 2022	Top Gun: Maverick	$10,678,905	$81,084,915	
26	3 July 2022	Minions: The Rise of Gru	$12,902,613	$12,902,613	
27	10 July 2022	Thor: Love and Thunder	$24,670,446	$24,670,446	
28	17 July 2022	Thor: Love and Thunder	$13,683,657	$38,354,103	
29	24 July 2022	Chilli Laugh Story	$8,585,875	$19,682,082	
30	31 July 2022	Chilli Laugh Story	$5,675,777	$25,357,859	
31	7 August 2022	Bullet Train	$4,566,229	$4,566,229	
32	14 August 2022	Mama's Affair	$9,598,934	$10,118,624	
33	21 August 2022	Mama's Affair	$11,015,822	$21,134,586	
34	28 August 2022	Warriors of Future	$19,703,177	$21,784,237	
35	4 September 2022	Warriors of Future	$22,266,042	$44,069,479	
36	11 September 2022	Table for Six	12,399,037	12,731,485	
37	18 September 2022	Table for Six	18,084,153	30,815,638	
38	25 September 2022	Table for Six	12,145,740	42,961,378	
39	2 October 2022	Table for Six	9,340,576	52,301,954	
40	9 October 2022	Table for Six	$8,793,319	$61,095,273	
41	16 October 2022	Table for Six	$4,988,927	$66,084,200	
42	23 October 2022	Black Adam	$10,050,753	$10,050,753	
43	30 October 2022	Black Adam	$7,623,202	$17,674,285	
44	6 November 2022	The Sparring Partner	$5,404,699	$8,647,865	
45	13 November 2022	Black Panther: Wakanda Forever	$23,692,764	$23,692,764	
46	20 November 2022	Black Panther: Wakanda Forever	$13,298,797	$36,991,941	
47	27 November 2022	Black Panther: Wakanda Forever	$6,672,078	$43,664,019	
48	4 December 2022	The Sparring Partner	$3,704,698	$34,566,721	
49	11 December 2022	The Sparring Partner	$2,229,923	$36,796,644	
50	18 December 2022	Avatar: The Way of Water †	$30,137,306	$30,137,306	
51	25 December 2022	Avatar: The Way of Water †	$45,023,241	$75,160,547	
52	1 January 2023	Avatar: The Way of Water †	$36,367,947	$105,297,853	

== Highest-grossing films ==
International film

Hong Kong film

Highest-grossing films of 2022 (In-year releases)
Rank	Title	Distributor	Domestic gross
1	Avatar: The Way of Water	20th Century Studios	HK$138.66 million (US$17.85 million)
2	Top Gun: Maverick	Paramount Pictures	HK$107.69 million (US$13.86 million)
3	Warriors of Future	One Cool Pictures	HK$81.71 million (US$10.52 million)
4	Table for Six	Edko Films	HK$76.9 million (US$9.9 million)
5	Doctor Strange in the Multiverse of Madness	Walt Disney Pictures	HK$65.38 million (US$8.41 million)
6	Jurassic World Dominion	Universal Pictures	HK$50.97 million (US$6.56 million)
7	Black Panther: Wakanda Forever	Walt Disney Pictures	HK$49.01 million (US$6.31 million)
8	Thor: Love and Thunder	Walt Disney Pictures	HK$47.84 million (US$6.16 million)
9	Mama's Affair	Emperor Motion Pictures	HK$41.49 million (US$5.34 million)
10	The Sparring Partner	Golden Scene	HK$41.36 million (US$5.32 million)

== See also ==
- 2022 in Hong Kong
- List of Hong Kong films of 2022
- List of 2021 box office number-one films in Hong Kong

Preceded by 2021 Box office number-one films	Box office number-one films 2022	Succeeded by 2023 Box office number-one films
