= Hong Kong Film Award for Best Costume Make Up Design =

Annual Chinese film award

- Country: Hong Kong
- Presented by: Hong Kong Film Awards
- Final award: 2022
- Currently held by: Wu Lilu; Ye Jiayin; Dora Ng; Karen Yip; Anita (2022)

The Hong Kong Film Award for Best Costume Make Up Design is an award presented annually at the Hong Kong Film Awards for a film with the best costume and makeup design. As of 2016 the current winner is Yee Chung-Man for his work on Monster Hunt.

== Winners and nominees ==
Table key
‡	Indicates the winner

Year	Nominee	Film	Note
2022 (40th)	Wu Lilu, Ye Jiayin, Dora Ng, Karen Yip‡	Anita‡	
2022 (40th)	Cheung Siu Hong, Chan Chi Ching Dos Santos	Hand Rolled Cigarette	
2022 (40th)	Wu Baoling, Bobo Ng Bo Ling	'Dynasty Warriors	
2022 (40th)	Emi Wada	Love After Love	
2022 (40th)	Bruce Yu, Karen Yip	Limbo	
