= Hello Missfortune =

Hong Kong television series (2021–2022)

- Also known as: 愛上我的衰神
- Genre: Fantasy; Drama; Romance
- Written by: Yeung Suet-yi; Lau Chi-ling; Chau Hiu-hung
- Directed by: Sandy Wong Wing-shan
- Starring: Hubert Wu; Erica Chan; Law Lan; Mark Ma; Mayanne Mak
- Opening theme: "Never Knew" by Hubert Wu
- Country of origin: Hong Kong
- Original language: Cantonese
- No. of episodes: 10

Production
- Producer: Dave Fong
- Production location: Hong Kong
- Running time: 43 minutes
- Production company: TVB

Original release
- Network: TVB Jade
- Release: 27 December 2021 – 7 January 2022

Hello Missfortune (Chinese: 愛上我的衰神; lit. 'Falling in Love with My Bad Luck') is a Hong Kong television series created by television network TVB, with Dave Fong serving as producer. The 10-episode series premiered on 27 December 2021 and concluded on 7 January 2022. Starring Hubert Wu and Erica Chan, the show incorporates elements of fantasy and the afterlife, depicting beings from different dimensions as they navigate unresolved conflicts from the past and learn to let go.

== Cast ==
- Hubert Wu as Chan Pei-ho: a timid food delivery man who lives and takes care of his grandmother Dave Fong indicated that the character is not meant to be a hero; instead, he is a representation of cowardice and fearful people living in society.
  - Mason Fung as teenage Pei-ho
- Erica Chan as Poon Siu-yu: a novice destiny administrator at the Life Administration Agency who is tasked with managing luck or misfortune in the human world
  - Stephanie "Miumiu" Au as the teenage Siu-yu
  - Lee Tsz-yan as the childhood Siu-yu
- Mark Ma as Santino Pong Yiu-tin: a colleague of Siu-yu at the Life Administration Agency
- Mayanne Mak as Pau Sau-yuk: a colleague of Siu-yu at the Life Administration Agency
- Timothy Cheng as Szema Kwan-leun: the supervisor at the Life Administration Agency
- Law Lan as Lam Sze-mei: Chan Pei-ho's grandmother
- Lincoln Hui as Alvin Tau Jit-yan: an artist and Siu-yu's ex-boyfriend
- Vivian Koo as Kam-yan: a visual arts university student and Alvin's current girlfriend
- Eddie Li Kong as Chan Chuen: Pei-ho's father who is alienated from home due to his gambling debt
- June Ng as Chan Lai-chi: Pei-ho's older sister who is married and works in the financial industry
- Susan Tse as Bong Yeung Ka-sin: Santino's living mother
- Chiu Lok-yin as Poon Hou-yin: Siu-yu's deceased father
- Doris Chow as Ng Wai-yi: Siu-yu's deceased mother

== Synopsis ==
When a person dies, they are either taken to many layers of Heaven or reincarnated. The deceased Poon Siu-yu died seven years ago at the age of 17 in the first dimension, "Human World". She entered the second dimension and joined the Life Administration Agency, becoming a novice destiny administrator. She is tasked to give out a certain amount of misfortune to Chan Pei-ho, a food delivery worker in the human world. Despite the rain and sunshine, Pei-ho works daily, earning just a little income, with his family paying little attention to him. The stumbling blocks in life make Pei-ho difficult to breathe. Moreover, he has to endure the obstacles Siu-yu causes him at work. Finding empathy for her client, Siu Yu is reluctant to fulfill her task and finds herself helping him. Pei-ho gradually discovers that this mysterious girl is not an ordinary being. As the story unfolds, Siu-yu recalls the reason for her death and how she was mercilessly killed, in which Pei-ho was indirectly involved, realizing there is a deliberate link that dragged them back together. The two, despite everything, develop a love story that most likely wouldn't work out.

== Production and background ==
Sometimes I work with a pen. For some reason, the pen went missing. What happened? Is there a "higher spirit" trick? Why do they want to trick mortals? There is a great mystery behind life events as nothing happens without reason. Based on these life experiences, we created this story.

— Fong spoke of the conceptual idea

Produced by Dave Fong, the central theme of Hello Missfortune talks about how one can make wrong decisions when facing different opportunities in life. When that happens, they need to endure loss and learn how to redeem themselves. The series featured Erica Chan in her first leading role. Fong was deeply impressed with Chan's professionalism and learning motivation during her previous cameo roles and decided to cast her as the female lead, feeling she has the "right temperament" for the character. Chan deliberately took an acting course before filming to be fully prepared. Singer-songwriter Vivian Koo also made her acting debut appearing in a supporting role. She was "moved" by the storyline, which inspired her to co-write a song, "With You", for the soundtrack. Principal photography took place approximately from April to June 2021. A few details in the storyline made references to the classic film Days of Being Wild (1990) and TVB series, including Gods of Honour (2001) and When Heaven Burns (2004).

== Music ==
Track Listing
No.	Title	Lyrics	Music	Artist(s)	Length
1.	"Never Knew (太多不知道)"	Wong Hau-lam	Hubert Wu, Sotoc	Hubert Wu	3:31
2.	"With You (我要和你在一起)"	Sandy Cheung	Vivian Koo, Liu Yu-san, Nick Wong, Joseph Wei	Vivian Koo	4:06

== Reception and ratings ==
Hello Missfortune received a favorable response from the audience, being noted for the depth of its storyline and freshness in casting. Lam Chun-king from HK01 wrote the show was able to "explain complex truths in a simple way", which can "impact the soul and make people reflect". Lam Wai-san from Sky Post expressed that the plot brought out "different touching stories" while Shum Ngo-ming from Ming Pao Weekly highlighted Erica Chan's "natural acting" as the "biggest surprise" of the series.

Week	Episodes	Airing dates	Average ratings (Note: According to Hong Kong's TV rating system, each rating point represents approximately 64,670 viewers.)	Ref.
1	1 – 5	27–31 December 2021	15.9 points	
2	6 – 10	3–7 January 2022	17.7 points	
Average Total:			16.8 points	

== Awards and nominations ==
Year	Award	Category	Nominated work	Results	Ref.
2022	55th TVB Anniversary Awards	My Favorite Female Character In A Television Series	Erica Chan (for Poon Siu-yu)	Nominated	
