= Hong Kong Film Award for Best Sound Design =

Annual award at Hong Kong film festival

- Country: Hong Kong
- Presented by: Hong Kong Film Awards
- Currently held by: Tu Duu-Chih; Wu Shu-Yao (2022)

The Hong Kong Film Award for Best Sound Design is an award presented annually at the Hong Kong Film Awards for a film with the best sound design. As of 2016 the current winners are Kinson Tsang, George Yiu-Keung Lee and Chun Hin Yiu for The Taking of Tiger Mountain.

== Winners and nominees ==
Table key
‡	Indicates the winner

Year	Nominee	Film	Note
2022 (40th)	Tu Duu-Chih, Wu Shu-Yao‡	Anita‡	
2022 (40th)	Nip Kei Wing, Ip Siu Kei	Shock Wave 2	
2022 (40th)	Wang Danrong, Steve Burgess, Yin Jie	The Battle at Lake Changjin	
2022 (40th)	Lee Yiu Keung George, Yiu Chun Hin, Kaikangwol Rungsakorn, Stan Yau	Raging Fire	
2022 (40th)	Nopawat Likitwong	Limbo	
