= Limbo (2021 film) =

2021 Hong Kong film by Soi Cheang

- Official film poster

Chinese name
- Traditional Chinese: 智齒
- Simplified Chinese: 智齿
Transcriptions
Standard Mandarin
- Hanyu Pinyin: Zhì Chǐ
Yue: Cantonese
- Jyutping: Zi3 Ci2
- Directed by: Soi Cheang
- Written by: Au Kin-yee; Shum Kwan-sin
- Based on: Wisdom Tooth by Lei Mi
- Produced by: Wilson Yip; Paco Wong
- Starring: Gordon Lam; Cya Liu; Mason Lee; Hiroyuki Ikeuchi
- Cinematography: Cheng Siu-Keung
- Edited by: David Richardson
- Music by: Kenji Kawai
- Production companies: Sun Entertainment Culture; Bona Film Group; Er Dong Pictures; Aether Film Production
- Distributed by: Just Distribution Limited
- Release dates: 1 March 2021 (Berlinale); 18 November 2021 (Hong Kong)
- Running time: 118 minutes
- Country: Hong Kong
- Languages: Cantonese; Japanese; English
- Budget: US$16 million
- Box office: HK$1,276,603

Limbo is a 2021 Hong Kong action thriller film directed by Soi Cheang and starring Gordon Lam, Cya Liu, Mason Lee and Hiroyuki Ikeuchi. The film is based on the novel Wisdom Tooth by Chinese novelist Lei Mi.

The film had its worldwide premiere at the 71st Berlin International Film Festival on 1 March 2021, and was theatrically released in Hong Kong on 18 November 2021. The film enjoyed box office success in France.

== Plot ==
Rookie police officer Will Yam (Mason Lee) is a recent graduate of the police academy. Due to a wave of serial killings, Will is partnered with veteran officer Cham Lau (Gordon Lam), who was recently reinstated on the force. However, the duo is unable to solve the cases and instead causes a series of incidents. Later, Cham re-encounters a drug-addicted street urchin, Wong To (Cya Liu), who ran over his wife and daughter in the past, and his anger makes him spiral out of control and continuously abuse her. Will clumsily loses his pistol, which is found by the serial killer. With the killer lurking in the city, a crisis grows closer.

== Cast ==
- Gordon Lam as Cham Lau (劉中選), respectfully referred to as Brother Cham (斬哥), a veteran police officer of the Regional Crime Unit.
- Cya Liu as Wong To (王桃), a drug-addicted street urchin who ran over Cham's wife in a DUI, leaving her in a vegetative state and becomes Cham's informant in order to repent her past mistake.
- Mason Lee as Will Yam (任凱), a rookie police officer of the Regional Crime Unit and Cham's new partner.
- Hiroyuki Ikeuchi as Yamada Akira (山田收), a waste picker with Oedipus complex and acrotomophilia.
- Fish Liew as Coco (可樂), a disabled drug dealer.
- Hugo Ng as Chief (大Sir), Cham and Will's superior officer.
- Sammy Sum as Boss Spark (逼啪)
- Hanna Chan as Will's wife
- Kumer So as Grizzly (灰熊)

== Production ==
Principal photography for Limbo began in September 2017 in Hong Kong and wrapped up after three months filming, with To Kwa Wan and Kwun Tong being the main filming locations as many old buildings are located in these districts of the city.

On 2 October 2017, filming of a fight scene between actors Gordon Lam and Hiroyuki Ikeuchi took place on a rooftop in Kwun Tong. Both Lam and Ikeuchi lost 8 pounds and 30 pounds of weight respectively for their roles in the film. On 8 October 2017, which was also Lam's birthday, filming took place in Kowloon Bay for a scene where Lam was going through a garbage chute looking for evidence.

The film was released in black-and-white.

== Release ==
Limbo had its world premiere at the 71st Berlin International Film Festival, which was held virtually from 1 to 5 March 2021. The film was later shown in competition at the 23rd Far East Film Festival from 25 to 26 June 2021 where it won the Purple Mulberry Award The film was released in Hong Kong on 18 November 2021.

== Reception ==
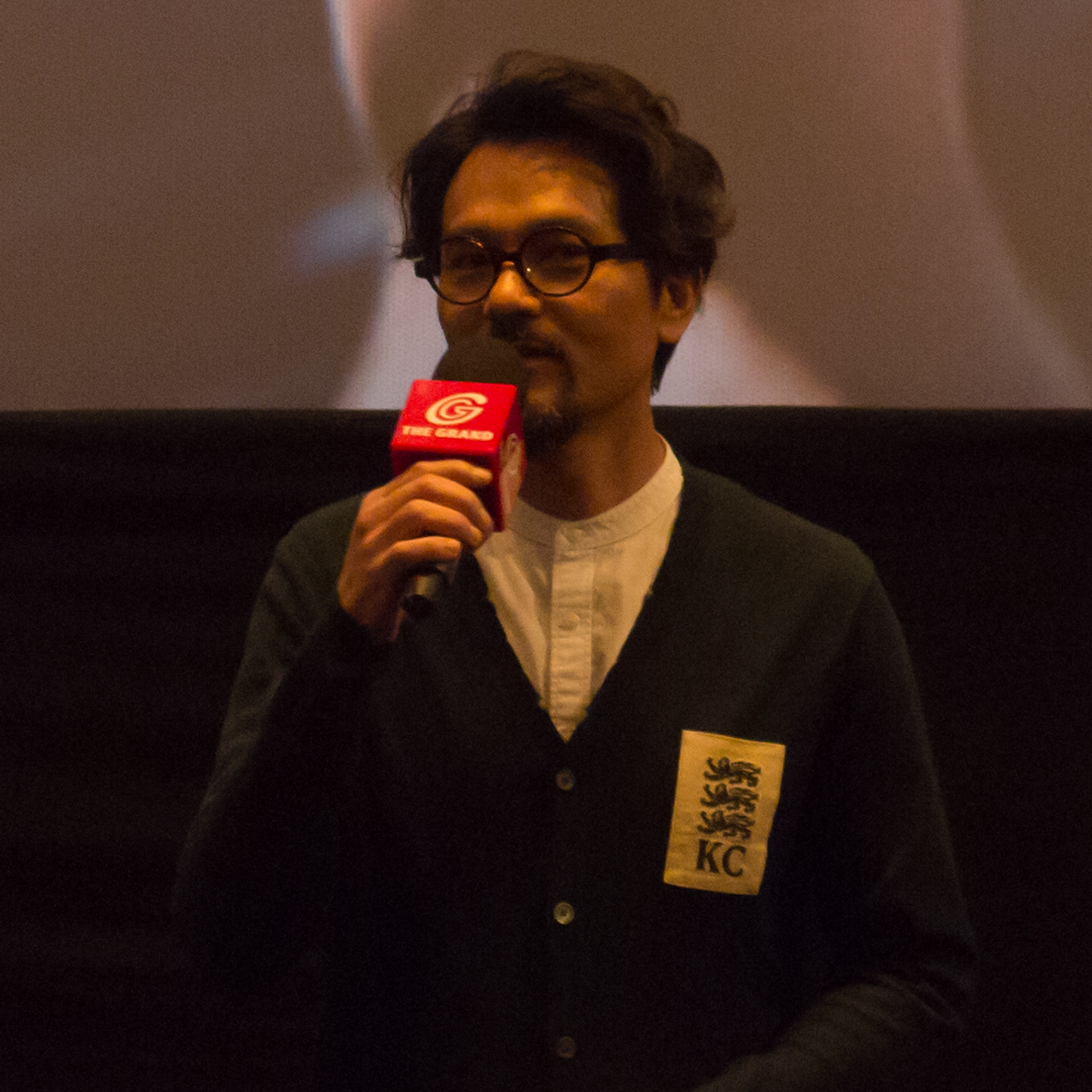
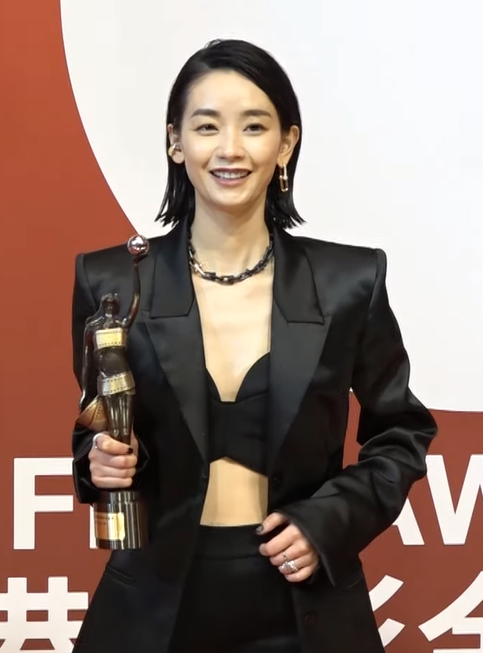
Gordon Lam and Cya Liu's performance received critical acclaim. Liu's performance earned her Best Actress award at the 40th Hong Kong Film Awards.

=== Box office ===
In Hong Kong, the film grossed HK$740,238 during its first four days of release, opening at No. 5 during its debut weekend. In its second weekend, the film grossed HK$563,365, coming in at No. 10, and have grossed a total of HK$1,276,603 so far.

The film enjoyed box office success in France with 51,254 tickets sold nationwide, the film outgrossed X (2022) and became distributor Kinovista's highest-grossing release.

=== Critical reception ===
Lee Marshall of Screen Daily praises director Cheang Pou-soi's "dystopian vision of an Asian metropolis in the throes of a political and social identity crisis" as the film's "most striking feature." Jessica Kiang of Variety praises the film's well-choreographed action sequences which complement Cheng Siu-Keung's dazzling camera work.

== Awards and nominations ==
Year	Award	Category	Recipient(s)	Result	Ref.
2021	23rd Far East Film Festival	MYmovies Purple Mulberry Award	Limbo	Won	
2022	28th Hong Kong Film Critics Society Awards	Best Film	Limbo	Won	
2022	28th Hong Kong Film Critics Society Awards	Best Director	Cheang Pou-soi	Nominated	
2022	28th Hong Kong Film Critics Society Awards	Best Actor	Gordon Lam	Nominated	
2022	28th Hong Kong Film Critics Society Awards	Best Actress	Cya Liu	Won	
2022	40th Hong Kong Film Awards	Best Film	Limbo	Nominated	
2022	40th Hong Kong Film Awards	Best Director	Cheang Pou-soi	Nominated	
2022	40th Hong Kong Film Awards	Best Actor	Gordon Lam	Nominated	
2022	40th Hong Kong Film Awards	Best Actress	Cya Liu	Won	
2022	40th Hong Kong Film Awards	Best Supporting Actress	Fish Liew	Nominated	
2022	40th Hong Kong Film Awards	Best Screenplay	Au Kin-yee, Shum Kwan Sin	Won	
2022	40th Hong Kong Film Awards	Best Cinematography	Cheng Siu-Keung	Won	
2022	40th Hong Kong Film Awards	Best Art Direction	Kenneth Mak, Renee Wong	Won	
2022	40th Hong Kong Film Awards	Best Film Editing	David Richardson	Nominated	
2022	40th Hong Kong Film Awards	Best Costume & Make Up Design	Bruce Yu, Karen Yip	Nominated	
2022	40th Hong Kong Film Awards	Best Original Film Score	Kenji Kawai	Nominated	
2022	40th Hong Kong Film Awards	Best Action Choreography	Jack Wong Wai-leung	Nominated	
2022	40th Hong Kong Film Awards	Best Visual Effects	Garrett Lam, Ho Man Lok, Diu King Wai	Nominated	
2022	40th Hong Kong Film Awards	Best Sound Design	Nopawat Likitwong	Nominated	
2022	59th Golden Horse Awards	Best Narrative Feature	Limbo	Nominated	
2022	59th Golden Horse Awards	Best Director	Cheang Pou-soi	Nominated	
2022	59th Golden Horse Awards	Best Leading Actor	Gordon Lam	Nominated	
2022	59th Golden Horse Awards	Best Leading Actress	Cya Liu	Nominated	
2022	59th Golden Horse Awards	Best Supporting Actor	Mason Lee	Nominated	
2022	59th Golden Horse Awards	Best Adapted Screenplay	Au Kin-yee and Shum Kwan-sin	Won	
2022	59th Golden Horse Awards	Best Cinematography	Cheng Siu-Keung	Won	
2022	59th Golden Horse Awards	Best Visual Effects	Garrett Lam, Ho Man-lok and Diu King-wai	Won	
2022	59th Golden Horse Awards	Best Art Direction	Mak Kwok-keung and Renee Wong	Won	
2022	59th Golden Horse Awards	Best Makeup & Costume Design	Bruce Yu Ka-on and Karen Yip	Nominated	
2022	59th Golden Horse Awards	Best Action Choreography	Jack Wong Wai-leung	Nominated	
2022	59th Golden Horse Awards	Best Original Film Score	Kenji Kawai	Nominated	
2022	59th Golden Horse Awards	Best Film Editing	David M. Richardson	Nominated	
2022	59th Golden Horse Awards	Best Sound Effects	Nopawat Likitwong	Nominated	
2022	59th Golden Horse Awards	Audience Choice Award	Limbo	Won	
