= Hong Kong Film Award for Best Original Film Score =

Annual Chinese film award

- Country: Hong Kong
- Presented by: Hong Kong Film Awards
- Final award: 2022
- Currently held by: Ryuichi Sakamoto (2022)

The Hong Kong Film Award for Best Original Film Score is an award presented annually at the Hong Kong Film Awards for a film with the best original music score. As of 2022 the current winner is Ryuichi Sakamoto for Love After Love.

== Winners and nominees ==
Table key
‡	Indicates the winner

Year	Nominee	Film	Note
2020 (39th)	Eman Lam‡	My Prince Edward‡	
2020 (39th)	Varqa Buehrer	Better Days	
2020 (39th)	Yusuke Hatano	Say It Properly	
2020 (39th)	Peter Kam	I'm Livin' It	
2020 (39th)	Kenji Kawai	Ip Man 4: The Finale	
2022 (40th)	Ryuichi Sakamoto‡	Love After Love‡	
2022 (40th)	Chiu Tsang Hei, Andy Cheung	Anita	
2022 (40th)	Kenji Kawai	Limbo	
2022 (40th)	Day Tai	Zero to Hero	
2022 (40th)	Wong Hin Yan	Drifting	
