= Ricky Ko =

Hong Kong film director

Ricky Ko Tsz Pun
- 高子彬
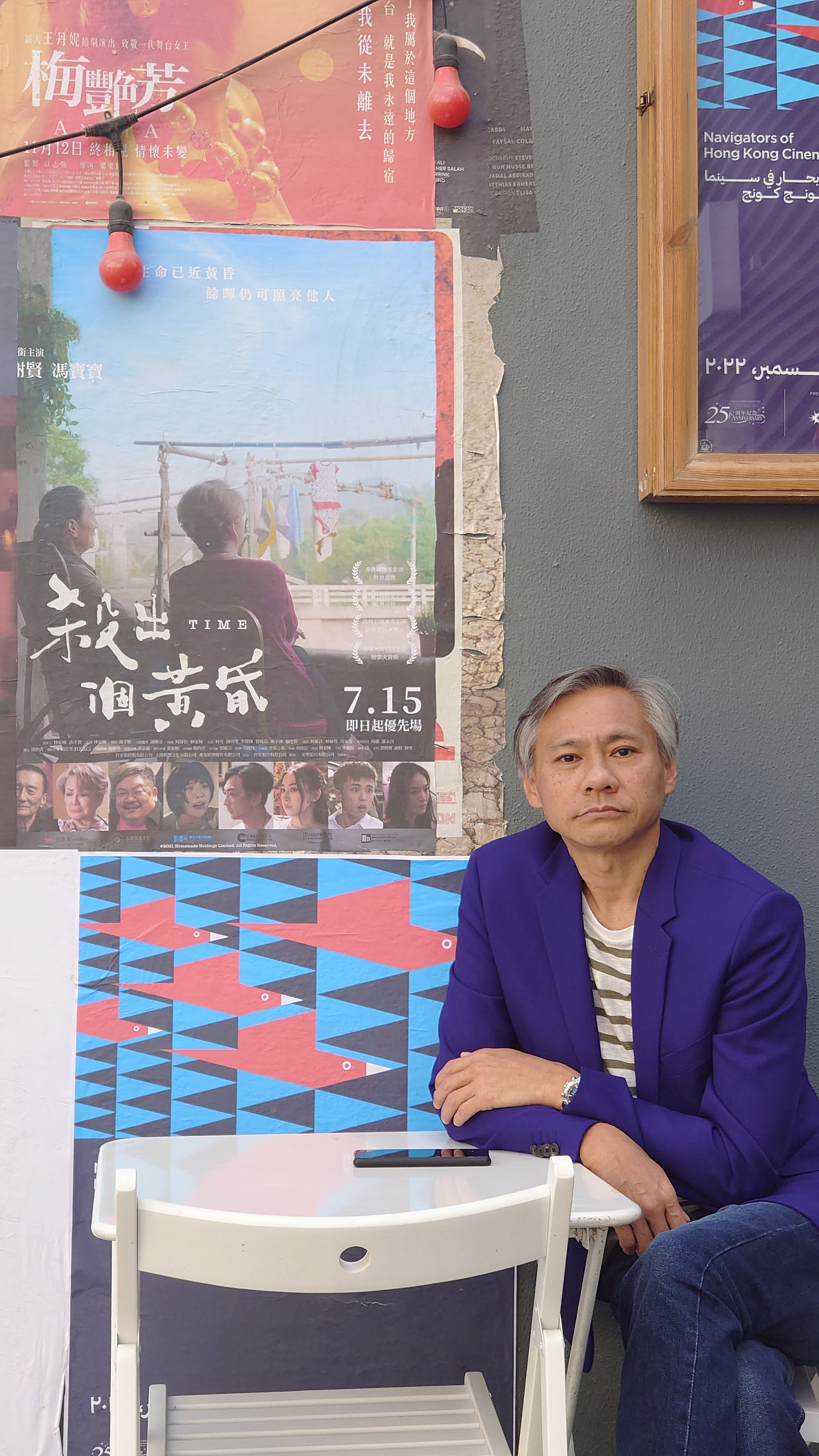
- Ko at the Dubai International Film Festival
- Born: 16 January 1972 (age 54); British Hong Kong
- Occupations: Film director; actor; screenwriter; NAUI diving instructor
- Years active: 1997–present

Chinese name
- Traditional Chinese: 高子彬
- Simplified Chinese: 高子彬
Transcriptions
Standard Mandarin
- Hanyu Pinyin: Gao Zi Bin

Ricky Ko Tsz Pun (高子彬] born 16 January 1972) is a film director from Hong Kong. He worked at Television Broadcasts Limited (TVB) before shifting to film work in 2004.

== Career ==
After completing his studies in Australia, Ko returned to Hong Kong in 1996 and joined the television broadcasting company TVB. Beginning his career as a production assistant, he worked on a number of television series, including Gods of Honour, Journey to the West, A Kindred Spirit, Country Spirit, Blade Heart, The Conqueror's Story, War of the Genders, Happy Ever After, Seed of Hope, and The Legend of Lady Yang.

In late 2004, Ko resigned from TVB and transitioned to the film industry.

Ko was a first assistant director on films including Ghost In the Shell, Project Gutenberg, The White Storm 2 - Drug Lords, The New King of Comedy, and Ip Man: The Final Fight.

In 2021, he directed his debut film, Time. Ko is a member of the Hong Kong Film Directors' Guild.

== Filmography ==
=== As director ===
As Director
Year	Title	Cast	Notes/Ref.
2021	Time	Patrick Tse, Petrina Fung, Lam Suet, Chung Suet Ying	The 28th Hong Kong Film Critics Society: Best Actor (Won), Best Screenplay (Won), Best Film (Won), Film of Merit (Nominated), Best Actress (Nominated); 2021 LEAFF London East Asian Film Festival: Special Mention Award (Ricky Ko Tsz Pun Awarded); 2021 VIFF (Vancouver International Film Festival); Audience Award, Gateway (Won: Ricky Ko Tsz Pun); 2021 FEFF (Udine Far East Film Festival); White Mulberry Award (Nominated: Ricky Ko Tsz Pun); The 18th Hong Kong Film Directors' Guild]; Best Actor (Won); 2021 Hong Kong Screenwriters' Guild; Best Character Award (Won), Best Screenplay Award (Won); The 40th Hong Kong Film Awards: Best Actor (Won), Best Screenplay (Nominated), Best Supporting Actor (Nominated), Best Supporting Actress (Nominated), Best New Performer (Nominated)
2022	Drug Hunting	Wang Qianyuan, Yang Zi, Liu Min Tao Yuxian Shang, Ding Haifeng	
2023	Out of the Shadow	Kay Tse, Larine Tang, Ansonbean, Lawrence Cheng, Natalie Tong	Osaka Asian Film Festival World Premiere; Fantasia 2024 North American Premiere and Cheval Noir; Asia Film Awards Hong Kong Film Gala Presentation 2024 in Phnom Penh Cambodia

=== Other positions ===
Films
Year	Title	Post	Note
2005	Election	Director (Making Of)	
2007	Mad Detective	Director (Making Of)	
2006	Exiled	Director (Making Of)	
2008	Linger	Director (Making Of)	
2008	Sparrow	Director (Making Of)	
2009	Coweb	Director (Making Of)	
2010	All's Well, Ends Well 2010	First Assistant Director	
2012	Love Lifting	First Assistant Director	
2012	Nightmare	First Assistant Director	
2012	Lan Kwai Fong 2	First Assistant Director	
2013	Ip Man: The Final Fight	First Assistant Director	
2014	The Second Coming	First Assistant Director	
2014	Kung Fu Angels	First Assistant Director	
2014	Sara	First Assistant Director	
2015	An Inspector Calls	First Assistant Director	
2015	Angel Whispers	First Assistant Director, Actor	
2015	Daughter	First Assistant Director, Actor	
2016	The Mobfathers	First Assistant Director	
2016	Nessun Dorma	First Assistant Director	
2017	77 Heartbreaks	First Assistant Director	
2017	Ghost in the Shell	First Assistant Director	Hong Kong Splinter Unit
2017	The New King of Comedy	First Assistant Director	
2018	Project Gutenberg	First Assistant Director	
2019	The White Storm 2: Drug Lords	First Assistant Director	
2020	Federation of Hong Kong Filmmakers - Skills Enhancement Programme for Hong Kong Filmmakers - Action Choreography	Director	

=== Television ===
TV series
Year	Title	Post	Note
2007	ICAC Investigators 2007	Project Manager	
2009	ICAC Investigators 2009	Project Manager	
2010	Who's the Hero	Director	
2011	The Emperor's Harem	First Assistant Director	
2013	The Moment 2 (Episode 6)	Director	
2016	China's Megatomb Revealed	Director	National Geographic Channel
2024	ICAC Investigators	Director	
