= Raging Fire (film) =

2021 Hong Kong-Chinese film by Benny Chan

- Film poster

Chinese name
- Traditional Chinese: 怒火
- Simplified Chinese: 怒火
Transcriptions
Standard Mandarin
- Hanyu Pinyin: Nù Huǒ
Yue: Cantonese
- Jyutping: Nou6 Fo2
- Directed by: Benny Chan
- Screenplay by: Benny Chan; Ryan Ling; Tim Tong
- Produced by: Benny Chan; Donnie Yen
- Starring: Donnie Yen; Nicholas Tse; Qin Lan; Simon Yam
- Cinematography: Edmond Fung
- Edited by: Curran Pang
- Music by: Nicolas Errèra
- Production companies: Emperor Film Production Company; Tencent Pictures; Sil-Metropole Organisation; Maoyan Pictures; Super Bullet Pictures; One Cool Film Production; Central Motion Pictures; BC Films Production
- Distributed by: Emperor Motion Pictures (Hong Kong, Worldwide); Intercontinental Film Distribution (HK) (Hong Kong)
- Release dates: 30 July 2021 (China); 19 August 2021 (Hong Kong)
- Running time: 126 minutes
- Countries: Hong Kong; China
- Languages: Cantonese; Mandarin
- Box office: US$225 million (Note: See Box office)

Raging Fire is a 2021 action film directed by Benny Chan in his final directorial role before his death. The film is a co-production between Hong Kong and China and stars Donnie Yen in the lead role, alongside co-stars Nicholas Tse, Qin Lan and Simon Yam.

Raging Fire was released on 30 July 2021 in mainland China and Hong Kong on 19 August 2021. A spiritual successor titled Raging Havoc began production in Hong Kong under its former title The Unleashed Blaze in October 2023.

== Plot ==
Senior Inspector Cheung Sung-bong sets out to track down former Senior Inspector Yau Kong-ngo and his team as they ambushed many officers during major drugs bust against Wong Kwun, a gangster. Yau and his team finishes Wong Kwun and steals the drugs. It is revealed that Yau and his team wants to exact revenge on Cheung and the police department for having them imprisoned on charges of beating Coke, a suspect, to death during a case on the disappearance of Fok Siu-tong, a bank tycoon and owner a bank named HK Fortune Banking.

Cheung and his team raids nightclubs in order to know about the drug dealer who sold Wong Kwun's drugs. They soon learn about the drug dealer named Gwai and tries to capture him, but Gwai dies as he tries to escape Cheung. During a date with his girlfriend Kwan Mei-you, Chu Yuk-ming strangles Mei-you to death after he finds that she is cheating on him. Wong Kwun's watch is found on Mei-you's body and Cheung realizes Chu had stolen the watch and deduces Yau's involvement in Wong Kwun's death. Cheung tracks down Chu and a chase ensues where one of Yau's teammate Law Kim-wah gets arrested by the police.

Yau kills Chu in order to cover his tracks, where he along with his other teammate Mok Yik-chuen soon arrives at the police station to file a complaint about his another teammate Chiu Chi-keung's disappearance. The police soon find Chiu's body and learns that Yau strapped Cheung's former superior Sze-to Kit with a timed collar bomb to his neck and sent him to hold Cheung's pregnant wife Anna Lam hostage. Cheung manages to rescue Anna, but Kit dies in an explosion. Yau, Wah and Mok are released due to lack of evidence, where they form a plan to rob HK Fortune Banking.

Cheung soon learns about their plan where he along with his team head to HK Fortune Banking. Yau and his teammates rob the bank and shoots Fok due to his disappearance being the reason behind his imprisonment. Cheung locates Yau and his teammates and a chase ensues where Yau's team are all killed trying to flee. Yau is cornered by Cheung and they have an intense fight in a church. As police surround him, Yau kills himself by falling on an exposed rebar rather than going back to prison, while Cheung walks away.

== Cast ==
- Donnie Yen as Cheung Sung-bong (張崇邦), senior inspector of the Regional Crime Unit
- Nicholas Tse as Yau Kong-ngo (邱剛敖), Cheung's former protege and former senior inspector
- Qin Lan as Anna Lam (藍可盈), Cheung's pregnant wife.
- Simon Yam as Lok Chi-fai (駱智輝), Senior Assistant Commissioner of Police
- Ray Lui as Yiu Yeuk-sing (姚若成), Superintendent of the Regional Crime Unit and Cheung's superior officer and mentor.
- Ben Yuen as Sze-to Kit (司徒傑), former Commissioner of Police and Cheung's and Yau's former superior
- Ben Lam as Au Man-kwai (區萬貴), a drug dealer
- Ken Lo as Ma Kau-wing (馬交榮)
- Carlos Chan as Ha Chi-ming (夏智明), a higher-up police officer who looks down on Cheung and his squad.
- Patrick Tam as Beau Yuen (袁家寶), Chief Inspector of Regional Crime Unit, Cheung's superior officer and best friend.
- Kenny Wong as Tai Cheuk-yin (戴卓賢), Sergeant of the Regional Crime Unit and Cheung's most trusted subordinate.
- Deep Ng as Chow Chi-chun (周子俊), a Regional Crime Unit Probation Inspector and Cheung's subordinate
- Jeana Ho as Turbo Lui (呂慧思), a Regional Crime Unit officer and Cheung's subordinate.
- Angus Yeung as Cho Ning (曹寧), a Regional Crime Unit officer and Cheung's subordinate.
- Bruce Tong as Kwan Chung-him (關頌謙), a Regional Crime Unit officer and Cheung's subordinate.
- Henry Mak as Chiu Chi-keung (招志強), Yau's underling and former police officer.
- Yu Kang as Mok Yik-chuen (莫亦荃), Yau's underling and former police officer.
- German Cheung as Chu Yuk-ming (朱旭明), Yau's underling and former police officer.
- Tony Wu as Law Kim-wah (羅劍華), Yau's underling and a former police officer
- Derek Kok as Bill Cheung (張德標), an officer in Yau's squad
- Matt Chow as Officer Chow (周Sir)
- Fire Lee as Officer Tai (戴Sir)
- Mak Cheung-ching as Lam Ngai-sing (林毅星), a police senior superintendent
- Cheung Kwok-keung as Officer Lau (劉Sir), the Chief of the Explosive Ordnance Disposal Bureau, a Senior Superintendent.
- Kwok Fung as Fok Siu-tong (霍兆堂), a bank tycoon
- Julius Brian Siswojo as Wong Kwan (王焜), a drug dealer

== Music ==
The score is composed by Nicolas Errèra.
The film's theme song, titled Dead Lock (對峙), is composed and performed by Nicholas Tse, with lyrics written by Kenny So. A promotional song for the film was also released as a tribute to director Benny Chan, which is a cover of the song A Real Man (真的漢子), which was originally composed and performed by George Lam, with lyrics written by Cheng Kwok-kong. The new version is performed by Andy Lau, Donnie Yen, Wu Jing, Nick Cheung and Jordan Chan, with slightly altered lyrics written by Keith Chan.

== Production ==
The film was first announced at the 2019 Hong Kong Film & TV Market (FILMART). Producer and star Donnie Yen revealed that the film had originally been planned to be filmed in a foreign country, but he persuaded co-producer and director Benny Chan to stay in Hong Kong for filming. Production began in April of the same year. On 6 May 2019, a scene was filmed involving Yen jumping from a balcony for which he was suspended on wires for two hours. The film held its blessing ceremony on 23 July 2019 at a constructed set on Peking Road in Quarry Bay Film Studio that was attended by Emperor Group head Albert Yeung, Chan, Yen and the rest of the cast and crew. Production for the film wrapped up in September 2019.

On 23 August 2020, director Chan died from nasopharyngeal cancer. It was reported that he had fallen ill during the film's production and had later been diagnosed with the illness. Chan completed his directing duties for the film but was unable to take part in post-production due to his illness.

== Release ==
Raging Fire was theatrically released in China on 30 July 2021, followed by a limited release in the United States on 13 August 2021, and in Hong Kong on 19 August 2021.

== Reception ==
=== Box office ===
As of 10 October 2021, Raging Fire has grossed US$225 million worldwide, combining its gross from Hong Kong (US$3.3 million), China (US$221.2 million), North America (US$368,301), Australia (US$54,211), New Zealand (US$2,417) and Taiwan (US$172,558).

In Hong Kong, the film debuted at No. 2 during its opening weekend, grossing HK$7,592,576 (US$974,544) during its first four days of release. On its second weekend, the film grossed HK$8,775,780, coming in at No. 1, and have grossed a total of HK$16,368,356 (US$2,101,717) by then. During its third week, the film grossed HK$5,271,353, coming in at No. 2, and have grossed a total of HK$21,636,628 (US$2,783,956) by then. On its fourth weekend, the film remained at No. 2 where it grossed HK$2,749,226 and have grossed a total of HK24,385,854 (US$3,135,396) so by then. During its fifth weekend, the film grossed HK$1,049,458, coming in No. 5, and have accumulated a total gross of HK$25,435,312 (US$3,268,144) so far.

In China, the film debuted at No. 1 during its opening weekend, grossing US$40.5 million during its first three days of release. On its second weekend, the film grossed US$49.2 million, remaining at No. 1, and have grossed a total of US$89.7 million by then. The film remained at first place during its third weekend, grossing US$42.5 million, and have accumulated a total gross of US$132.3 million so far. The film stayed at No. 1 again for four consecutive weeks, grossing US$25.1 million during its fourth weekend and have grossed a total of US$157.9 million by then. During its fifth weekend, the film grossed US$19.2, coming in at No. 2 behind new release Free Guy, and have grossed a total of US$177.1 million by then. On its sixth week, the film grossed US$13.1 million, remaining at No. 2, and have grossed a total of US$190.2 million by then. During its seventh week, the film grossed US$10.7 million, coming in at No. 3, and have accumulated a total gross of US$200.9 million by then. On its eighth week, the film grossed US$8.8 million, remaining at No. 3, and have grossed a total of US$209.7 million so far.

=== Critical reception ===
Matthew Monagle of the Austin Chronicle gave the film 4/5 stars and praises the characterizations and action set pieces Lim Lian-yu of Yahoo! Singapore gave the film a score of 3.5/5 stars, describing the film as "126 minutes worth of explosive action that is bound to entertain and keep your eyes busy." Edmund Lee of the South China Morning Post gave the film a score of 3/5 stars, praising it as "the best that Hong Kong action-film making has to offer", but criticizing its illogical story and crude script.

G. Allen Johnson of the San Francisco Chronicle praises the film's action scenes but criticizes the exposition scenes which drags the film. Cary Darling of the Houston Chronicle praises director Chan's execution of a basic premise and the action choreography as "breathlessly exhilarating." Anna Smith of Deadline Hollywood describes the film as "an accomplished visual feat with detailed fight choreography and strong physical performances", while also noting its underdeveloped characterizations and overuse of flashbacks.

Marc Zirogiannis of Tae Kwon Do Life Magazine wrote, "In Raging Fire, Benny Chan's final directorial work, Yen combines the elements of his persona as an action star and dramatic actor for a successful result. His dramatic engagement equals his action prowess, and these elements combine to make this film superior."

== Awards and nominations ==
Year	Ceremony	Category	Recipient	Results	Ref(s)
2022	40th Hong Kong Film Awards	Best Film	Raging Fire	Won	
2022	40th Hong Kong Film Awards	Best Director	Benny Chan	Won	
2022	40th Hong Kong Film Awards	Best Cinematography	Fung Yuen Man	Nominated	
2022	40th Hong Kong Film Awards	Best Action Choreography	Donnie Yen, Ku Huen Chiu, Kenji Tanigaki, Li Chung Chi	Won	
2022	40th Hong Kong Film Awards	Best Film Editing	Curran Pang	Won	
2022	40th Hong Kong Film Awards	Best Sound Design	Lee Yiu Keung George, Yiu Chun Hin, Kaikangwol Rungsakorn, Stan Yau	Nominated	
2022	40th Hong Kong Film Awards	Best Visual Effects	Raymond Leung Wai Man, Lim Hung Fung Alex, Diu King Wai, Hung Man Shi Candy	Nominated	
2022	40th Hong Kong Film Awards	Best Original Film Song	"Dead Lock", composer: Nicholas Tse	Nominated	

== Spiritual successor ==
A spiritual successor to the film was first announced on 14 March 2023 at the Hong Kong International Film & TV Market (FILMART) to be directed by Derek Kwok, with Andy Lau production and starring alongside retiring cast member Nicholas Tse. The film began production in October 2023, with its English title announced as The Unleashed Blaze.
