= 40th Hong Kong Film Awards =

2022 Hong Kong Film Awards

- Official poster
- Awarded for: Excellence in cinematic achievements
- Announced on: February 16, 2022
- Presented on: July 17, 2022
- Site: The Star Hall, Kowloonbay International Trade & Exhibition Centre
- Organised by: Hong Kong Film Awards Association
- Official website: Hong Kong Film Awards

Highlights
- Best Film: Raging Fire
- Best Director: Benny Chan; Raging Fire
- Best Actor: Patrick Tse; Time
- Best Actress: Cya Liu; Limbo
- Most awards: 5 — Anita
- Most nominations: 14 — Limbo

Television coverage
- Channel: ViuTV
- Network: HK Television Entertainment

The 40th Hong Kong Film Awards presentation ceremony took place at The Star Hall at Kowloonbay International Trade & Exhibition Centre (KITEC) on 17 July 2022. Earlier it was scheduled for April 17 but it was postponed thrice due to COVID-19. Nominations announced on 16 February 2022, include films released theatrically both in 2020 and 2021, as the 2021 edition was cancelled due to the COVID-19 pandemic.

Raging Fire won the best film award, whereas its director Benny Chan, who died in 2020 and won the best director award at the ceremony. Anita, a biopic on Cantopop star Anita Mui won most awards, followed by Limbo and Raging Fire.

== Winners and nominees ==
Sources: Nominations

Winners are listed first, highlighted in boldface, and indicated with a double dagger ‡.

**Best Film**: **Raging Fire — Donnie Yen and Benny Chan, producers** ‡; Anita — Bill Kong, Ivy Ho and Tang Wai-but, producers; Limbo — Paco Wong and Wilson Yip, producers; Zero to Hero — Sandra Ng, producer; Drifting — Mani Man, producer	**Best Director**: **Benny Chan — Raging Fire**‡; Man Lim-chung — Keep Rolling; Longman Leung — Anita; Cheang Pou-soi — Limbo; Peter Chan — Leap
**Best Screenplay**: **Au Kin-yee, Shum Kwan Sin — Limbo** ‡; Ashley Cheung Yin Kei, Ho Siu Hong, Li Ho Tin, Ling Wai Chun — One Second Champion; Ho Ching Yi, Gordon Lam — Time; Jimmy Wan, David Lo — Zero to Hero; Jun Li — Drifting	**Best Actor**: **Patrick Tse — Time** ‡; Gordon Lam — Hand Rolled Cigarette; Gordon Lam — Limbo; Leung Chung-hang — Zero to Hero; Francis Ng — Drifting
**Best Actress**: **Cya Liu — Limbo** ‡; Chrissie Chau — Madalena; Louise Wong — Anita; Sandra Ng — Zero to Hero; Gong Li — Leap	**Best Supporting Actor**: **Mason Fung — Zero to Hero** ‡; Louis Koo — Anita; Lam Suet — Time; Will Or — Drifting; Tse Kwan-ho — Drifting
**Best Supporting Actress**: **Fish Liew — Anita**‡; Paw Hee Ching — Caught in Time; Chung Suet Ying — Time; Fish Liew — Limbo; Bai Lang — Leap; Lee Lai-chun — Drifting	**Best New Performer**: **Louise Wong — Anita**‡; Chung Suet Ying — Time; Leung Chung-hang — Zero to Hero; Mason Fung — Zero to Hero; Will Or — Drifting
**Best Cinematography**: **Cheng Siu-Keung — Limbo**‡; Rick Lau — Hand Rolled Cigarette; Fung Yuen Man — Raging Fire; Anthony Pun — Anita; Christopher Doyle, Kubbie Tsoi — Love After Love	**Best Film Editing**: **Curran Pang — Raging Fire**‡; William Chang, Alan Lo — Hand Rolled Cigarette; Chung Wai Chiu — Shock Wave 2; Mak Chi Sin, Li Dianshi, He Yongyi — The Battle at Lake Changjin; David Richardson — Limbo
**Best Art Direction**: **Kenneth Mak, Renee Wong — Limbo**‡; Cheung Siu Hong, Yman Yiu — Hand Rolled Cigarette; Pater Wong — Anita; Zhao Hai — Love After Love; Albert Poon Yick Sum — Drifting	**Best Costume & Make Up Design**: **Wu Lilu, Ye Jiayin, Dora Ng, Karen Yip — Anita**‡; Cheung Siu Hong, Chan Chi Ching Dos Santos — Hand Rolled Cigarette; Wu Baoling, Bobo Ng Bo Ling — Dynasty Warriors; Emi Wada — Love After Love; Bruce Yu, Karen Yip — Limbo
**Best Action Choreography**: **Donnie Yen, Ku Huen Chiu, Kenji Tanigaki, Li Chung Chi — Raging Fire** ‡; Leung Pok Yan — One Second Champion; Tang Sui Wa — Hand Rolled Cigarette; Li Chung Chi — Shock Wave 2; Jack Wong Wai Leung — Limbo	**Best Original Film Score**: **Ryuichi Sakamoto — Love After Love**‡; Chiu Tsang Hei, Andy Cheung — Anita; Kenji Kawai — Limbo; Day Tai — Zero to Hero; Wong Hin Yan — Drifting
**Best Original Film Song**: **"Origin of Time" — One Second Champion**; **Composer: Endy Chow, Chiu Sin-hang**; **Lyricist: Cheng Man**; **Vocal Artist: Endy Chow, Chiu Sin-hang @ToNick**‡; "Welcome To This City" — The Way We Keep Dancing; Composer: Day Tai, Heyo; Lyricist: Heyo, Afuc, Saville Chan; Artists: Heyo, Afuc, Lydia Lau, Jan Curious, Kids Choir-Ethan Tai, Sophia Tai, Yoyo Fan, Labroe Lee, Andrea Faith Chong; "Dead Lock" — Raging Fire; Composer: Nicholas Tse; Lyricist: Qiao Xing; Vocal Artist: Nicholas Tse; "Zero to Hero" — Zero to Hero; Composer: Day Tai; Lyricist: Saville Chan; Vocal Artist: Jer Lau; Drifting — Drifting; Composer, Lyricist, Vocal Artist: Wong Hin Yan	**Best Visual Effects**: **Yee Kwok Leung, Garrett K Lam, Raymond Leung Wai Man, Hung Man Shi Candy — Anita** ‡; Yee Kwok Leung, Garrett K Lam, Chiu Tak Piu, Loki Ho — Shock Wave 2; Tsui Hark, Dennis Yeung, Wang Lei — The Battle at Lake Changjin; Raymond Leung Wai Man, Lim Hung Fung Alex, Diu King Wai, Hung Man Shi Candy — Raging Fire; Garrett K Lam, Ho Man Lok, Diu King Wai — Limbo
**Best Sound Design**: **Tu Duu-Chih, Wu Shu-Yao — Anita**‡; Nip Kei Wing, Ip Siu Kei — Shock Wave 2; Wang Danrong, Steve Burgess, Yin Jie — The Battle at Lake Changjin; Lee Yiu Keung George, Yiu Chun Hin, Kaikangwol Rungsakorn, Stan Yau — Raging Fire; Nopawat Likitwong (Wisdom Teeth) — Limbo	**Best New Director**: **Chan Kin-long — Hand Rolled Cigarette** ‡; Chiu Sin-hang — One Second Champion; Man Lim Chung — Keep Rolling; Lau Ho Leung — Caught in Time; Jun Li — Drifting
**Best Asian Chinese Language Film**: **American Girl — Feng-I Fiona Roan (Taiwan)** ‡; Till We Meet Again — Giddens Ko (Taiwan); My Missing Valentine — Chen Yu-hsun (Taiwan)
**Lifetime Achievement**: **Michael Hui**‡	**Professional Spirit Award**: **Tony Chow**‡

== Films that received multiple nominations ==
Films that received multiple nominations
Nominations	Film
14	Limbo
12	Anita
11	Drifting
9	Zero to Hero
8	Raging Fire
7	Hand Rolled Cigarette
5	Time
4	One Second Champion
4	Love After Love
4	Shock Wave 2
3	The Battle at Lake Changjin
3	Leap

== Films that received multiple awards ==
Films that received multiple awards
Awards	Film
5	Anita
4	Raging Fire
4	Limbo
