= Anita (2021 film) =

2021 Hong Kong film by Longman Leung

- Theatrical release poster
- 梅艷芳
- Directed by: Longman Leung
- Screenplay by: Longman Leung; Jack Ng
- Based on: Anita Mui
- Produced by: Bill Kong; Ivy Ho; Tang Wai-but
- Starring: Louise Wong; Terrance Lau; Fish Liew; Gordon Lam; Miriam Yeung; Louis Koo
- Cinematography: Anthony Pun
- Edited by: David Richardson; Cheung Ka-fai; Ron Chan
- Music by: Chiu Tsang-hei; Cheung Yan-kit; Kubert Leung; Elliot Leung (Director's Cut)
- Production companies: Edko Films; Huaxia Film Distribution; Irresistable Films (HK); PCCW Media; One Cool Film Production
- Distributed by: Edko Films (HK); Sony Pictures Releasing International (Asia)
- Release date: 12 November 2021
- Running time: 140 minutes
- Country: Hong Kong
- Languages: Cantonese; Mandarin; Japanese; English
- Box office: US$18.5 million

Anita (Chinese: 梅艷芳) is a 2021 Hong Kong biographical musical drama film directed by Longman Leung, who co-wrote the screenplay with Jack Ng, based on the life of singer and actress Anita Mui. Louise Wong, in her screen role debut, stars as the titular singer, depicting her life from childhood until her last moments before her death of cervical cancer in 2003. The film features an ensemble cast, including Terrance Lau, Fish Liew, Gordon Lam, Miriam Yeung, and Louis Koo in supporting roles.

Production of the biopic began in the 2010s when Bill Kong, president of Edko Films, initiated the project to commemorate Mui's legacy. Leung signed on to the project and took over a year to write the script with Ng, as well as finalize the cast. Principal photography took place in 2018.

Although its initial 2020 release date was delayed due to COVID-19 pandemic, Anita was released in Hong Kong on 12 November 2021, followed by some Southeast Asia countries in the same month. The film received mixed to positive reviews, and made its HK$12M box-office debut with previous preview screenings. It is currently the ninth-highest grossing Hong Kong film of all time. An extended director's cut, featuring 1 hour of extra footage, was released digitally as five-episode miniseries on Disney+ through Star starting from 2 February 2022. A 4K re-edit version at 191 minutes was released in Hong Kong movie theaters in October 2025.

== Plot ==
Anita Mui and her elder sister Ann Mui are raised in a financially disadvantaged household. As children, they perform at Lai Chi Kok Amusement Park to help support their family. Their early exposure to live performance leads to an opportunity in the entertainment industry following an encounter with Adam Cheng. Anita later enters the inaugural New Talent Singing Awards organized by Television Broadcasts Limited and Capital Artists, where she wins first place and signs a professional recording contract. During this period, she works with manager Florence Chan, company executive Alfredo So, and fashion designer Eddie Lau.

At a nightclub engagement, Anita fills in for the absent senior singer Johnny Yip, this leads to her first stage appearance alongside Leslie Cheung. After the performance, the two develop a professional friendship and agree that if either holds a concert at the Hong Kong Coliseum, the other will appear as a guest without payment.

Anita subsequently develops a relationship with Japanese singer Goto Yuki. In 1985, while traveling in Japan, she becomes aware of tensions between Goto and his management, which reflect constraints on his career. After learning further details about his personal circumstances, she ends the relationship. Upon returning to Hong Kong, she recommends Leslie for the leading role in the film Rouge. The film contributes to her recognition as an actress and leads to major awards, including Best Actress at both the Golden Horse Awards and Hong Kong Film Awards.

At the height of her career, Anita is involved in an incident at a nightclub in which she refuses a request to perform for Kwok, a criminal boss. She subsequently leaves Hong Kong and spends a period in Chiang Mai with her partner, actor Ben Lam. After their separation, she returns to Hong Kong and participates in charitable activities, including providing assistance to people in need and supporting the construction of schools in mainland China.

In 2000, Ann dies of cervical cancer, while Anita is later diagnosed with the same illness. Three years later, while the world faced the SARS epidemic, the sudden death of Leslie further affects Anita's personal life. Despite her condition, she undergoes treatment and proceeds with a final series of concerts. During her farewell performance at the Hong Kong Coliseum, she wears a special wedding gown designed by Eddie and concludes the concert with the song "Song of the Sunset". Anita dies on 30 December 2003 at the age of 40, shortly after completing her final performances.

== Cast ==
- Louise Wong as Anita Mui, a renown Hong Kong musician, known as the Queen of Cantopop.
  - Chan Jan as young Anita
- Fish Liew as Ann Mui, an Anita's older sister who is also a musician.
  - Goldgi Yan as young Ann
- Terrance Lau as Leslie Cheung, a singer and actor who is Anita's best friend.
- Louis Koo as Eddie Lau, a fashion designer who is Anita's best friend.
- Gordon Lam as Alfredo So, a general manager of Capital Artists.
- Miriam Yeung as Florence Chan, a talent agent of Capital Artists.
- Ayumu Nakajima as Goto Yuki, a Japanese singer who was the first ex-boyfriend of Anita, which is based on Japanese singer Masahiko Kondō.
- Tony Yang as Ben Lam, an actor who was the second ex-boyfriend of Anita (Cantonese dubbed version by Gabriel Harrison).
- David Siu as Kwok, a triad-affiliated film investor, which is based on 14K-affiliated film producer Wong Long-wai.
- Waise Lee as Leonard Ho, a film producer and CEO of Golden Harvest.
- Wong Chun as Stanley Kwan, a filmmaker who is the director of Rouge.
- Michael Ning as Michael Lai, a songwriter worked in Capital Artists.
- Carlos Chan as Adam Cheng, a singer and actor who discovered Mui sisters at the Lai Chi Kok Amusement Park.

== Production ==
=== Development and writing ===
Producer Bill Kong had first become friends with Anita Mui during the 1980s, after Mui helped his then-fledgling film company, Edko, successfully promote The Adventures of Milo and Otis (1986) in Hong Kong. Years later, Mui asked Kong to help her get an impactful, memorable movie role in return. Grateful for her earlier generosity, Kong had her lined up to star in Zhang Yimou's House of Flying Daggers (2004), but Mui died in December 2003 before the film began production. Regretful that he couldn't repay the favour for Mui in time, Kong thought about producing a biopic about the singer's life for over a decade. However, he had difficulties finding an appropriate script for the project, and could not find a suitable actress to play Mui.

Determined to bring the project to life, Kong decided to approach Longman Leung in 2015 about the biopic project. Kong initially wanted to work with screenwriter Lilian Lee, who had written the screenplay for Rouge, which Mui starred in. However, Lee turned the offer down. Leung wrote an initial synopsis, conducted a year of interviews with Mui's inner circle, and developed a script with co-writer Jack Ng.

=== Casting ===
For Anita, Leung took notes on how historical drama The Crown portrayed its subject matter. He was inspired by the television series' focus on casting actors for their ability to evoke a historical figure's personality. Casting calls for the film began in late 2016, with Kong and Leung spending a year deliberating on who should play Mui. According to Leung, the production team auditioned over 3000 actors during the process. After multiple rounds of auditions, the team made the decision in November 2017 to cast model Louise Wong in her first film role. In her auditions, Wong performed a Cantonese nanyin song, a wenxi Chinese opera performance, the theme from Rouge, and Anita Mui's song “Life Written in Water” (似水流年). According to Kong, the production team were moved to tears by Wong's performance during her final audition, where she sang Mui's "Sunset Melodies" (夕陽之歌) in a full dress rehearsal of the film's final scene. Wong was initially stunned by her casting, as she had never considered becoming an actress. After coming to terms with the magnitude of the role, she began training in acting and performance for six months.

In addition to Wong, the production team cast Louis Koo to play fashion designer Eddie Lau, and Gordon Lam as pianist-friend So Hau-leung (蘇孝良). For the role of Leslie Cheung, the production team went with Terrance Lau, who was positively received for his work in the 2019 romantic drama Beyond the Dream. While he eventually accepted the part, Lau nearly turned the opportunity down due to the pressure he felt of portraying Cheung.

=== Filming ===
Anita entered production in 2018, with principal photography lasting 80 days. As the movie depicted scenes mostly in 1980s Hong Kong, the production crew secured permissions to film in Hong Kong landmarks, such as the Hong Kong Coliseum before its renovation and Hong Kong Stadium. Leung, who had previously directed effects-heavy action films, used his post-production experience to leverage computer-generated imagery to produce settings of the past. The Hong Kong visual effects company, Free-D workshop, was tasked with recreating various Hong Kong landmarks from the 80s and 90s. The visual effects team worked with the art team to reconstruct demolished buildings like the Lee Theatre, or places where the scenery had changed a lot, such as the East Tsim Sha Tsui waterfront.

Filming in Thailand took place ostensibly in a secluded villa called Lanna Hill House, in the Mae-On district of Chiang Mai.

Although Leung had members of his crew dedicated to obtaining the rights to Mui's music from the company that held them, he still found difficulty finding existing masters of her recordings and was only able to locate four originals. Taking inspiration from the recording process of the biopic Bohemian Rhapsody, Leung's audio team blended vocal tracks of Mui, Wong, and a session singer in order to recreate Mui's singing style.

After getting feedback from friends in the industry, the cast and crew did an additional 10-day shoot in 2019. The film was in post-production during the COVID-19 pandemic in Hong Kong.

== Release ==
=== Marketing ===
The first trailer and poster for Anita was released in May 2021. However, Wong's involvement with the project was kept a mystery until 8 July 2021, when she was officially announced as the actor to be portraying Mui.

Following the film's release, Edko Films would continue to promote Anita by offering free tram rides in Hong Kong on the 18th anniversary of Mui's death on 30 December.

=== Box office ===
Anita had its world premiere as the last film shown at the 2021 Busan International Film Festival. The film was released on 12 November 2021 in Hong Kong and mainland China. Sony Pictures Releasing and Buena Vista International will distribute the film in five Asian countries, Malaysia, Singapore, Taiwan, Thailand and Vietnam by the end of 2021. The film topped the box office in Hong Kong upon release, and debuted second at the Chinese box office with $6.3 million in ticket sales and earning more than 10 million yuan on its opening day.

On 5 January 2022, Disney announced that an episodic adaptation of Anita would be available on Disney+ Star content starting on 2 February of that year. The series, titled Anita (Director's Cut), is composed of five 45-minute long episodes. It rearranges existing scenes and contains over an hour of unreleased footage.

On 6 January 2022, the film was screened in Thailand nationally.

Almost four years after the original screening, another re-edited version of Anita premiered in Hong Kong on 10 October 2025. This version, featuring unreleased footage, had a runtime of 206 minutes with a 15-minute intermission.

== Reception ==
Richard Kulpers of Variety wrote, "Longman Leung’s nostalgic drama has a soft center but should still please the late star’s worldwide legion of fans. Edmund Lee of South China Morning Post wrote, "There are notable – and understandable – omissions. While the film elaborates on Mui’s ultimately futile romantic relationships and highlights her charitable endeavors, it shies away from mentioning her fabled political activism in the aftermath of the Tiananmen Square crackdown in 1989. Mui’s bloodsucking mother and brothers – a key part of her tragic backstory – are also conspicuously absent."

On the review aggregator website Rotten Tomatoes, 60% of 5 critics' reviews are positive, with an average rating of 7.3/10.

== Accolades ==
Award	Date of ceremony	Category	Recipients	Result	Ref.
Hong Kong Film Awards	17 July 2022	Best Film	Anita	Nominated	
Hong Kong Film Awards	17 July 2022	Best Director	Longman Leung	Nominated	
Hong Kong Film Awards	17 July 2022	Best Actress	Louise Wong	Nominated	
Hong Kong Film Awards	17 July 2022	Best Supporting Actor	Louis Koo	Nominated	
Hong Kong Film Awards	17 July 2022	Best Supporting Actress	Fish Liew	Won	
Hong Kong Film Awards	17 July 2022	Best New Performer	Louise Wong	Won	
Hong Kong Film Awards	17 July 2022	Best Cinematography	Anthony Pun	Nominated	
Hong Kong Film Awards	17 July 2022	Best Art Direction	Pater Wong	Nominated	
Hong Kong Film Awards	17 July 2022	Best Costume and Make Up Design	Dora Ng and Karen Yip	Won	
Hong Kong Film Awards	17 July 2022	Best Original Film Score	Chiu Tsang-hei and Andy Cheung	Nominated	
Hong Kong Film Awards	17 July 2022	Best Sound Design	Tu Duu-chih and Wu Shu-yao	Won	
Hong Kong Film Awards	17 July 2022	Best Visual Effects	Yee Kwok-leung, Garrett K Lam, Raymond Leung, and Candy Hung	Won	
