= Hand Rolled Cigarette =

2020 Hong Kong film by Chan Kin-long

- Official film poster
- Traditional Chinese: 手捲煙
- Simplified Chinese: 手卷烟
- Hanyu Pinyin: Shǒu Juàn Yān
- Jyutping: Sau2 Gyun2 Jin1
- Directed by: Chan Kin-long
- Written by: Ryan Ling; Chan Kin-long
- Produced by: Lawrence Ah Mon
- Starring: Gordon Lam; Bipin Karma
- Cinematography: Rick Lau
- Edited by: William Chang; Alan Lo
- Music by: Hanz Au; Iris Liu; Joylon Cheung
- Production company: Hand-Roll Cigarette Film Production
- Distributed by: Edko Films
- Release dates: 3 November 2020 (HKAFF); 19 November 2020 (GHFF); 17 June 2021 (Hong Kong)
- Running time: 110 minutes
- Country: Hong Kong
- Language: Cantonese
- Budget: HK$3.25 million
- Box office: HK$7.34 million

Hand Rolled Cigarette (Chinese: 手捲煙) is a 2020 Hong Kong neo-noir crime drama film written and directed by Chan Kin-long in his directorial debut, and starring Gordon Lam as a retired colonial-era soldier who takes in a troubled South Asian youth (Bipin Karma). The film opened the 17th Hong Kong Asian Film Festival on 3 November 2020, and also closed the 57th Golden Horse Film Festival on 19 and 20 November 2020, where it was nominated for seven awards including Best Feature Film. The film held a special preview screening in Hong Kong on 30 April 2021, before it was widely released on 17 June 2021 in the territory.

== Plot ==
In 1996, a band of British Hong Kong soldiers who are not granted British citizenship choose different paths after the disbandment of the Hong Kong Military Service Corps. Kwan Chiu convinces Winston to speculate on the stock markets, but the 1997 Asian financial crisis sees Winston lose all his wealth. After a debt-stricken Winston commits suicide, his ex-brothers-in-arms blame Kwan and cut ties with him, but Kwan secretly takes on his debt in place of his widow.

Kwan has joined the triads in the subsequent years. In 2019, Kwan brokers a deal between Taiwanese turtle smuggler Pickle and local triad leader Big Mouth Tai. One day, a young South Asian thief, Mani, is pursued by Tai's top follower Chook and takes shelter in Kwan's home in Chungking Mansions. Mani offers Kwan HK$1 million to take him in for five days to which Kwan agrees. The two men are initially cold towards each other, but start to bond when Mani discovers a video of Kwan's past military services and Kwan takes care of Mani's brother Mansu on his behalf.

Later, Tai finds out that the turtles he bought are dead in transit, summons Kwan to demand the return of the deposit and kills Pickle. Kwan is shocked at seeing the corpse of Mani's cousin Kapil, who was punished for stealing Tai's drugs. Mani gives Kwan a bag of drugs for him to pay off the debt, and Kwan gives him a pack of his hand rolled cigarette as a sign of their friendship. Just as the problem seems to have resolved, Mani is abducted by Tai's underlings, and his relation with Kwan is revealed by Kwan's iconic cigarette.

Pickle's fellow smuggler Bamboo tracks down Kwan, and Kwan leads Bamboo to Tai's hideout, where Mani is held captive. Held at gunpoint, Tai shifts the blame on a seriously injured Chook and seals a new deal with Bamboo. Kwan ferociously fights off a couple of Tai's henchmen, but when Tai is about to deal a fatal blow to Kwan, the betrayed Chook interrupts and kills Tai. Mani rolls a cigarette for a dying Kwan, becoming the first person to do so.

Some time later, Mani gives Kwan's fellow soldiers a note of full repayment of Winston's debt.

== Cast ==
- Gordon Lam as Kwan Chiu (關超)
- Bipin Karma as Mani (文尼)
- Michael Ning as Chook (辣雞)
- Ben Yuen as Big Mouth Tai (大口泰)
- Tai Bo as Bamboo (竹昇)
- Chin Siu-ho as Wah (華佬)
- Tony Ho as Tofu (豆腐)
- Chu Pak-hong as Wood (木頭)
- Aaron Chow as Winston (雲斯頓)
- To Yin-gor as Pickle (菜甫)
- Bitto Singh Hartihan as Kapil (卡比)
- Anees as Mansu (文素)
- Joman Chiang as teacher

== Production ==
Supported by the Hong Kong First Feature Film Initiative (FFFI), Hand Rolled Cigarette began production in March 2020 in Hong Kong and was the only film in production when the film industry was affected by the COVID-19 pandemic. As a result, Lam did not receive any salary for acting in the film to support the local film industry. The film held its blessing ceremony on 16 June 2020 in Kwai Chung, after a delay in the filming schedule due to the pandemic. Shooting for Hand Rolled Cigarette officially wrapped up on 12 August 2020 .

== Release ==
Hand Rolled Cigarette made its world premiere as the opening film of the 17th Hong Kong Asian Film Festival on 3 November 2020. The film also closed the 57th Golden Horse Film Festival on 19 November 2020 and competed in its award ceremony. The film later held a special preview screening at the Premier Elements Cinema in Hong Kong on 30 April 2021, before having a wide theatrical release on 17 June 2021 in the territory.

Hand Rolled Cigarette was later shown in competition at the 23rd Far East Film Festival from 1 to 2 July 2021 where it won the White Mulberry Award. It was also invited at 20th New York Asian Film Festival in 'Uncaged Award for Best Feature Film Competition' section and was screened on August 6, 2021 at Film at Lincoln Center.

== Box office ==
In Hong Kong, the film debuted at No. 4 on its opening weekend, grossing HK$1,835,082 during its first four days of release. On its second weekend, the film grossed HK$2,342,955, moving up to No. 3, and have grossed a total of HK$4,178,037 (US$538,310) by then. During its third weekend, the film grossed HK$1,924,475, remaining at No. 3, and have accumulated a total gross of HK$6,102,512 (US$785,788) by then. On its fourth week, the film grossed HK$753,578, coming in at No. 6, and have grossed a total of HK$6,856,090 (US$882,675) by then During its fifth weekend, the film grossed HK$492,984, ranking at No. 9, and have accumulated a total gross of HK$7,349,074 so far.

== Awards and nominations ==
Year	Ceremony	Category	Recipient	Results
2020	57th Golden Horse Awards	Best Film	Hand Rolled Cigarette	Nominated
2020	57th Golden Horse Awards	Best Actor	Gordon Lam	Nominated
2020	57th Golden Horse Awards	Best New Director	Chan Kin-long	Nominated
2020	57th Golden Horse Awards	Best Art Direction	Cheung Siu-hong, Yiu Hon-man	Nominated
2020	57th Golden Horse Awards	Best Makeup & Costume Design	Cheung Siu-hong, Chan Chi-ching	Nominated
2020	57th Golden Horse Awards	Best Action Choreography	Johnny Tang	Nominated
2020	57th Golden Horse Awards	Best Film Editing	William Chang, Alan Lo	Nominated
2021	23rd Far East Film Festival	White Mulberry Award for best first film	Hand Rolled Cigarette	Won
2022	2021 Hong Kong Film Directors' Guild Awards	Best New Director	Chan Kin-long	Won
2022	40th Hong Kong Film Awards	Best Actor	Gordon Lam	Nominated
2022	40th Hong Kong Film Awards	Best Cinematography	Rick Lau	Nominated
2022	40th Hong Kong Film Awards	Best Film Editing	William Chang, Alan Lo	Nominated
2022	40th Hong Kong Film Awards	Best Art Direction	Cheung Siu-hong, Yman Yiu	Nominated
2022	40th Hong Kong Film Awards	Best Costume & Make Up Design	Cheung Siu-hong, Dos Santos Chan Chi-ching	Nominated
2022	40th Hong Kong Film Awards	Best Action Choreography	Tang Sui-wah	Nominated
2022	40th Hong Kong Film Awards	Best New Director	Chan Kin-long	Won
