= So Wa-wai =

Hong Kong Paralympic athlete

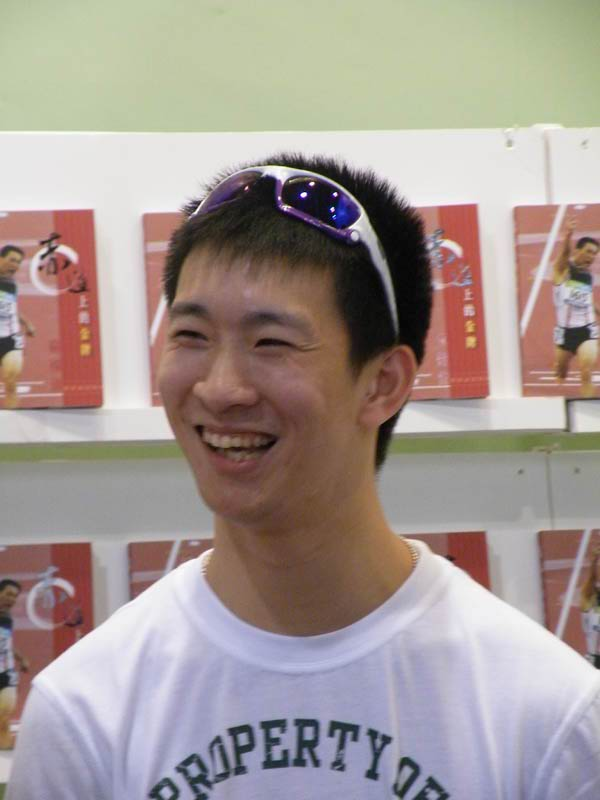
- So Wa-wai at the Hong Kong Book Fair, 2009

Personal information
- Born: 6 October 1981 (age 44) British Hong Kong
- Height: 172 cm (5 ft 8 in) (2021)

Sport
- Sport: para-athletics
- Disability class: T36
- Event(s): 100 metres, 200 metres, 400 metres
Medal record
Men's para-athletics
Representing Hong Kong
Paralympic Games
Gold medal – first place	1996 Atlanta	4 × 100 m T34–37
Representing Hong Kong, China
Paralympic Games
Gold medal – first place	2000 Sydney	100 m T36
Gold medal – first place	2000 Sydney	200 m T36
Gold medal – first place	2000 Sydney	400 m T36
Gold medal – first place	2004 Athens	200 m T36
Gold medal – first place	2008 Beijing	200 m T36
Silver medal – second place	2004 Athens	100 m T36
Silver medal – second place	2004 Athens	400 m T36
Silver medal – second place	2012 London	200 m T36
Bronze medal – third place	2000 Sydney	4×100 m T38
Bronze medal – third place	2000 Sydney	4×400 m T38
Bronze medal – third place	2008 Beijing	100 m T36
IPC World Championships
Gold medal – first place	2011 Christchurch	100 m T36
Bronze medal – third place	2013 Lyon	200 m T36
Asian Para Games
Silver medal – second place	2010 Guangzhou	100m T36
Silver medal – second place	2010 Guangzhou	200m T36

So Wa-wai (Chinese: 蘇樺偉; Jyutping: sou^{1} waa^{4} wai^{5}; born on 6th October 1981) is a retired athlete from Hong Kong who has competed in the Paralympic Games on five occasions, winning 12 medals. He has been referred to as the "Wonder Boy" (Chinese: 神奇小子; Jyutping: san^{4} kei^{4} siu^{2} zi^{2}) by Hong Kong people.

== Early life ==
So was born with jaundice which affected both his hearing and the balance of his limbs, and hence competes in the T36 classification for athletes with cerebral palsy. At the age of 10, his enthusiasm for running was noticed by athletics coach Poon Kin-lui, who then began to formally train So.

== Paralympic career ==
His first Paralympic appearance came at the 1996 games in Atlanta, where he won a gold medal as part of the men's 4×100 m relay team in the T34–37 classification.

Over the course of the next two summer Paralympic Games, 2000 in Sydney and 2004 in Athens, So won four gold and two silver medals in a range of individual events, up to a distance of 400 m, as well as two bronze medals in relay events.

In 2008, So was chosen to be part of the torch relay as the Olympic flame passed through Hong Kong on its way to Beijing. However, his participation in the games themselves was put into doubt when an injury to his father rendered him unable to work. So was forced to give up his training and take up a full-time job to support his family. In response, Andy Lau, a Hong Kong entertainer and the singer of the Beijing Paralympic Games official theme song "Flying with the Dream", gave him a full-time job with the flexibility to allow him to train for the Games.

At the 2008 Summer Paralympics, So led the Hong Kong team into the Bird's Nest Stadium during the opening ceremony as the flagbearer. He first won a bronze medal in the 100 m, a performance with which he was disappointed with, followed by a sixth place in the 400 m. In the 200 m T36 final, he broke his own world record with a time of 24.64 seconds on the way to winning the gold medal, making him the Paralympic champion in that event for the third successive occasion. After the race, he said he had been ill before the competition and that, "During the first part of today's competition I did not run at my normal speed"; he attributed his win to both "good luck" and "practice".

So retired from competition in January 2016 and began to work for the Hong Kong Paralympic Committee and Sports Association for the Physically Disabled that year.

So is the current world record holder in both the 100 and 200 m men's T36 classification.

== Related film ==
In 2021, So's story was adapted into the film Zero to Hero (Chinese: 媽媽的神奇小子; lit. 'Mom's Wonder Boy'), starring Sandra Ng and Leung Chung-hang. The film focuses on So's perseverance. In response to the film's fictional elements and dramatisation of So's story, Hong Kong Paralympic Committee chief Martin Lam Chun-ying said that, "There's no way his brother would sell his gold medals".

== See also ==
- Hong Kong at the 2008 Summer Paralympics
- Hong Kong at the Paralympics
