= Zero to Hero (film) =

2021 Hong Kong film by Jimmy Wan

- Film poster
- Traditional Chinese: 媽媽的神奇小子
- Simplified Chinese: 妈妈的神奇小子
- Literal meaning: Mom's magical boy
- Hanyu Pinyin: Māmā de shénqí xiǎozi
- Jyutping: maa1 maa1 dik1 san4 kei4 siu2 zi2
- Directed by: Jimmy Wan
- Written by: Lo Man-tsun
- Produced by: Sandra Ng
- Starring: Leung Chung-hang; Mason Fung; Sandra Ng; Louis Cheung
- Cinematography: Tam Wai-kai
- Edited by: Curran Pang
- Music by: Day Tai
- Production companies: One Cool Pictures; Lian Ray Pictures; Big Honor Entertainment; Edko Films
- Release dates: 1 July 2021 (Udine); 12 August 2021 (Hong Kong); 18 August 2021 (Macau)
- Running time: 102 minutes
- Country: Hong Kong
- Language: Cantonese

Zero to Hero (previously known as On Your Mom, Get Set, Go!; Chinese: 媽媽的神奇小子) is a 2021 Hong Kong biographical sports drama film directed by Jimmy Wan. The film is based on the true story of medal-winning Paralympian So Wa-wai, who overcame personal and physical struggles with the help of his mother to emerge a winner.

The film has its premium at Far East Film Festival at Udine on 1 July 2021 and was later released in Hong Kong on August 12, 2021.

The film was selected as the Hong Kong entry for the Best International Feature Film at the 94th Academy Awards.

== Plot ==
In 1984, So Wa-wai is born with cerebral palsy caused by severe neonatal jaundice, leaving him with hearing and mobility impairments. Doctors tell his parents that he may never be able to walk or care for himself, but his mother, So Bik-chu, refuses to give up on him. She dedicates herself to raising So while working multiple jobs to support the family.

Growing up, So is frequently bullied because of his condition. During one encounter, he unexpectedly outruns his attackers, revealing an exceptional natural speed. Recognizing his talent, Bik-chu introduces him to athletics coach Fong Yiu-ming, who recruits him to Hong Kong's para-athletics team. Although So initially lacks confidence and discipline, Fong's demanding coaching and Bik-chu's unwavering support help him develop into a promising sprinter.

As So competes in international competitions, he gradually earns recognition as one of Hong Kong's leading Paralympic athletes. His success culminates at the 1996 Summer Paralympics, where he wins Hong Kong's first Paralympic gold medal. Despite his achievement, he discovers that Paralympic athletes receive significantly less financial support and public recognition than their Olympic counterparts. Frustrated by the disparity, Bik-chu speaks out on behalf of the athletes, earning respect from both the sporting community and the public.

As the years pass, So continues to gain more gold metals through his running and becomes his countries “Wonder Boy”. Outside athletics, So struggles to balance training with everyday life. After an incident leaves his father unable to work, So is left with no choice but to quit running and help support his family financially as a mail courier. His mother is eventually able to get So sponsorships and he then has to juggle between training for the upcoming Olympics, ads, and the strained relationship that has grown with his mother. The amounting exhaustion and pressure all comes to a head for So before the upcoming Olympics.

Competing before a home-region audience, he defends his standing as a para-athlete. Reflecting on his family and his mother, he sets a world record to win a Paralympic gold medal. His victory brings recognition to himself and Hong Kong's Paralympic movement.

The film ends with photographs and captions detailing the real So Wa-wai's achievements, including his twelve Paralympic medals and his status as Hong Kong's most successful Paralympian, while paying tribute to Bik-chu's role in his success.

== Cast ==
- Leung Chung-hang and Mason Fung as So Wa-wai
- Sandra Ng
- Louis Cheung
- Chin Siu-ho
- Lo Hoi-pang
- Mak Pui-tung
- Yeung Wai-lun
- Chung Suet Ying
- Tony Wu

== Reception ==
On the review aggregator website Rotten Tomatoes, 100% of 5 critics' reviews are positive, with an average rating of 6.1/10.

== Awards and nominations ==
Year	Ceremony	Category	Recipient	Results	Ref(s)
2022	40th Hong Kong Film Awards	Best Film	Zero to Hero	Nominated	
2022	40th Hong Kong Film Awards	Best Screenplay	Jimmy Wan, David Lo	Nominated	
2022	40th Hong Kong Film Awards	Best Actor	Leung Chung-hang	Nominated	
2022	40th Hong Kong Film Awards	Best Actress	Sandra Ng	Nominated	
2022	40th Hong Kong Film Awards	Best Supporting Actor	Mason Fung	Won	
2022	40th Hong Kong Film Awards	Best New Performer	Mason Fung	Nominated	
2022	40th Hong Kong Film Awards	Best New Performer	Leung Chung-hang	Nominated	
2022	40th Hong Kong Film Awards	Best Original Film Score	Day Tai	Nominated	
2022	40th Hong Kong Film Awards	Best Original Film Song	"Zero to Hero", Composer: Day Tai; Lyricist: Saville Chan; Vocal Artist: Jer Lau	Nominated	

== See also ==
- List of submissions to the 94th Academy Awards for Best International Feature Film
- List of Hong Kong submissions for the Academy Award for Best International Feature Film
