= Leung Chung-hang (actor) =

Hong Kong actor

- 梁仲恆
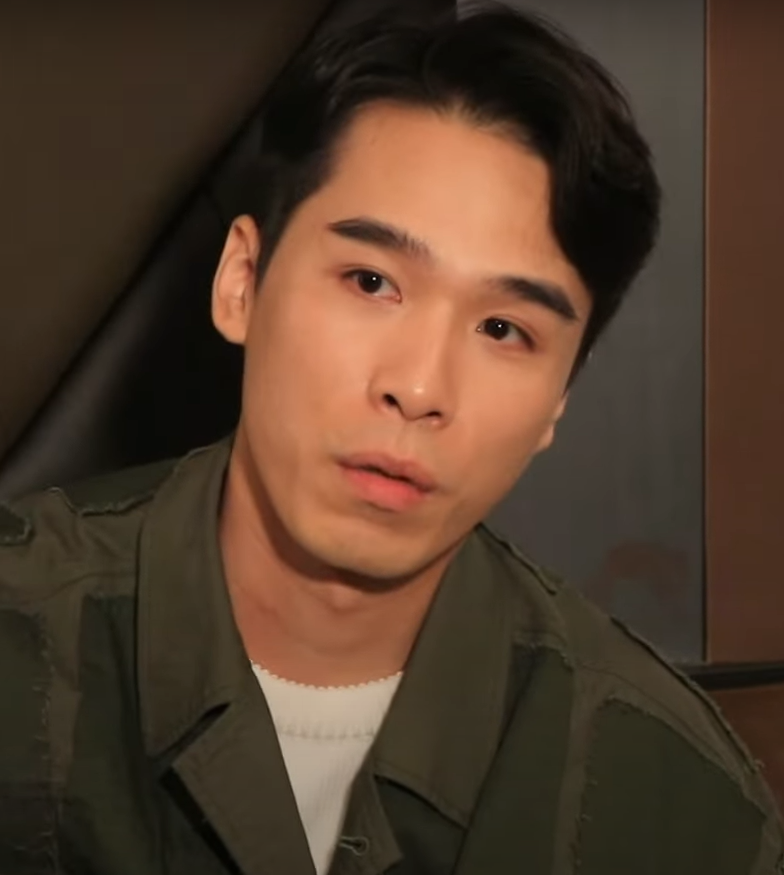
- Leung in January 2024
- Born: Leung Chung-hang; 1993 or 1994 (age 31–32); Hong Kong
- Education: Hong Kong Academy for Performing Arts (BFA)
- Occupation: Actor
- Years active: 2021–present

Bing Leung Chung-hang (Chinese: 梁仲恆; born 1993/1994) is a Hong Kong actor best known for his debut role as So Wa-wai in the biographical film Zero to Hero (2021), which earned him nominations for Best Actor and Best New Performer in the 40th Hong Kong Film Awards.

== Biography ==
Leung was born in 1993 or 1994. He attended the Hong Kong Academy for Performing Arts to study acting and graduated with first class honours in 2016. After graduation, he joined the Chung Ying Theatre Company and became a full-time stage actor. He left the theatre company in November 2021 to pursue an onscreen acting career.

In 2021, Leung won his onscreen debut role as medal-winning Hong Kong Paralympian So Wa-wai in the biographical film Zero to Hero after three rounds of audition. His performance was positively received and earned him nominations for Best Actor and Best New Performer in the 40th Hong Kong Film Awards. Leung later landed another major role in the 2023 drama film In Broad Daylight, starring alongside Bowie Lam and Jennifer Yu. In 2024, Leung was cast in lead roles in romance film Love at First Lie and action thriller film Rob N Roll.

== Filmography ==
=== Film ===
Year	Title	Role	Notes/Ref.
2021	Zero to Hero	So Wa-wai	
2023	In Broad Daylight	Leung (亮)	
2024	Love at First Lie	Dai Keung (大強)	
2024	Rob N Roll	Fisher	
2024	The Lyricist Wannabe	Kan	
2024	All Shall Be Well	Victor	
2024	Cesium Fallout	Po-ming (寶明)	
2024	The Prosecutor	Prosecutor	

=== Television ===
Year	Title	Role	Notes/Ref.
2025	Where is My Fifteen Minutes	Admin	Recurring role
2026	Before the End	Steven	Recurring role
TBA	In Geek We Trust	TBA	Main role (season 2)

== Awards and nominations ==
Year	Award	Category	Work	Result	Ref.
2022	40th Hong Kong Film Awards	Best Actor	Zero to Hero	Nominated	
2022	40th Hong Kong Film Awards	Best New Performer	Zero to Hero	Nominated	
