= List of Hong Kong films of 2024 =

List of Films

This article lists feature-length Hong Kong films released in 2024.

== Box office ==
The highest-grossing Hong Kong films released in 2024, by domestic box office gross revenue, are as follows:

(List of 2024 box office number-one films in Hong Kong)

Highest-grossing films released in 2024
Rank	Title	Distributor	Domestic gross
1	The Last Dance	Emperor Cinema	HK$147,426,913
2	Twilight of the Warriors: Walled In	Media Asia Distribution	HK$112,907,437
3	Cesium Fallout	Edko Films	HK$43,400,494
4	Table for Six 2	Edko Films	HK$39,586,496
5	The Prosecutor	Mandarin Motion Pictures	HK$29,492,403
6	The Moon Thieves	Emperor Cinema	HK$27,967,216
7	Papa	Golden Scene	HK$23,471,177
8	We 12	Edko Films	HK$22,540,610
9	Rob N Roll	Gala Film Distribution	HK$22,127,621
10	Crisis Negotiators	Edko Films	HK$21,597,547

== Releases ==
Opening		Title	Director	Cast	Genre	Ref.
J A N	11	I Did It My Way	Jason Kwan	Andy Lau, Gordon Lam, Eddie Peng, Cya Liu, Simon Yam	Action, crime	
J A N	18	Love at First Lie	Patrick Kong	Mandy Tam, Edward Chen, Leung Chung-hang, Henick Chou	Romance	
J A N	25	Moscow Mission	Herman Yau	Zhang Hanyu, Andy Lau, Huang Xuan, Janice Man	Crime, action	
F E B	9	The Moon Thieves	Steve Yuen	Edan Lui, Anson Lo, Louis Cheung, Michael Ning, Keung To	Action, crime	
F E B	9	Table for Six 2	Sunny Chan	Stephy Tang, Louis Cheung, Ivana Wong, Lin Min Chen, Peter Chan, Tse Kwan Ho, Jeffrey Ngai, Dee Ho, Bowie Wu, Law Lan, Michelle Yim, Fish Liew, Ram Chiang	Drama, comedy	
F E B	9	Rob N Roll	Albert Mak	Aaron Kwok, Gordon Lam, Richie Jen	Action, crime	
F E B	29	The Movie Emperor	Ning Hao	Andy Lau, Rima Zeidan, Pal Sinn, Ning Hao	Comedy	
M A R	7	The Lyricist Wannabe	Norris Wong	Chung Suet Ying, Eric Kot, Ansonbean, Amy Tang, Sabrina Ng, Chu Pak Hong	Drama	
M A R	14	We are Family	Benny Lau	Carlos Chan, Catherine Chau, Eric Tsang, Tien Niu	Drama	
M A R	28	We 12	Berry Ho	Mirror, Yeung Wai-lun	Comedy, action	
A P R	11	Fly Me to the Moon	Sasha Chuk	Sasha Chuk, Angela Yuen, Wu Kang-ren	Drama	
M A Y	1	All Shall Be Well	Ray Yeung	Patra Au, Maggie Li, Tai Bo, Leung Chung-hang, Fish Liew, Rachel Leung	Drama	
M A Y	1	Twilight of the Warriors: Walled In	Soi Cheang	Louis Koo, Sammo Hung, Richie Jen, Raymond Lam, Terrance Lau, Philip Ng, Tony Wu, German Cheung	Martial arts	
M A Y	21	Under Parallel Skies	Sigrid Andrea Bernardo	Janella Salvador, Metawin Opas-iamkajorn	Romance	
J U N	13	Crisis Negotiators	Herman Yau	Sean Lau, Francis Ng	Crime, drama	
J U L	4	Once Upon a Time in HKDSE	Leung Yik-ho	Hui Yin, Tang Ngai-hong	Documentary	
J U L	5	Customs Frontline	Herman Yau	Jacky Cheung, Nicholas Tse, Karena Lam, Cya Liu, Francis Ng	Action, crime	
A U G	29	The Unwavering Brotherhood	Terry Ng	Bosco Wong, Carlos Chan, Louis Cheung, Niki Chow, Michael Dao, Mark Cheng	Crime	
S E P	12	Love Lies	Ho Miu-ki	Sandra Ng, MC Cheung Tin-fu, Stephy Tang	Drama, romance	
S E P	19	Once in a Blue Moon	Andy Lo	Gladys Li, Peter Chan, Rachel Lee, Sumling Li, Yeung Wai-lun, Amy Tang, Carlos Chan	Drama	
S E P	26	Stuntman	Albert Leung, Herbert Leung	Tung Wai, Terrance Lau, Philip Ng, Cecilia Choi	Action, drama	
O C T	9	High Forces	Oxide Pang	Andy Lau, Zhang Zifeng, Qu Chuxiao, Liu Tao	Action, crime	
O C T	31	Possession Street	Jack Lai	Philip Keung, Candy Wong, Yeung Wai-lun	Horror	
N O V	1	Cesium Fallout	Anthony Pun	Andy Lau, Bai Yu, Karen Mok, Tse Kwan Ho, Ivana Wong, Louise Wong, Fish Liew, Dee Ho, Jeffrey Ngai, Leung Chung-hang	Disaster	
N O V	7	Blossoms Under Somewhere	Riley Yip	Marf Yau, Sheena Chan, Shin Cheung, Adam Pak, Paisley Wu	Drama	
N O V	14	The Last Dance	Anselm Chan	Dayo Wong, Michael Hui, Michelle Wai, Chu Pak Hong, Catherine Chau, Paul Chun, Elaine Jin, Rachel Leung, Rosa Maria Velasco, Michael Ning, Chung Suet Ying	Drama	
N O V	28	An Abandoned Team	Tomas Lee, Daniel Ho	Lawrence Cheng, Amy Lo, Jay Fung, Bonnie Wong	Drama	
N O V	28	Fresh Off Markham	Tak Yuen, Cyrus Lo, Trevor Choi	Jessica Chan, Edmond Clark, Nian Chang, Howard Li	Comedy	
D E C	5	Papa	Philip Yung	Sean Lau, Jo Koo, Dylan So	Drama	
D E C	12	Haunting Call	Danny Pang	Lin Min Chen, Jessica Chan	Horror	
D E C	20	Last Song for You	Jill Leung	Ekin Cheng, Ian Chan, Natalie Hsu, Cecilia Choi	Romance	
D E C	21	The Prosecutor	Donnie Yen	Donnie Yen, Julian Cheung, Michael Hui, Francis Ng, MC Cheung Tin-fu	Action, thriller	

== See also ==
- 2024 in Hong Kong
- List of 2024 box office number-one films in Hong Kong
- List of Hong Kong films of 2023
- 42nd Hong Kong Film Awards
