= The Lyricist Wannabe =

2023 Hong Kong film by Norris Wong

- Theatrical poster
- Traditional Chinese: 填詞L
- Jyutping: Tin^{4} Ci^{4} L
- Directed by: Norris Wong
- Screenplay by: Norris Wong
- Produced by: Wong Hoi; Norris Wong
- Starring: Chung Suet Ying; Eric Kot; Anson Chan; Amy Tang; Sabrina Ng; Chu Pak Hong; Ernest Poon; Yukki Tai
- Cinematography: Alfred Pong
- Edited by: Peter Chung
- Music by: Wong Kin Wai
- Production company: Sonatina Film
- Distributed by: Edko Films
- Release dates: 12 November 2023 (HKAFF); 7 March 2024 (Hong Kong)
- Running time: 113 minutes
- Country: Hong Kong
- Language: Cantonese
- Budget: HK$2,800,000

The Lyricist Wannabe (Chinese: 填詞L) is a 2023 Hong Kong drama film directed and written by Norris Wong and starring Chung Suet Ying, Eric Kot, Anson Chan, Amy Tang, Sabrina Ng, Chu Pak Hong, Ernest Poon and Yukki Tai in lead roles. The film is the first motion picture to be about Cantopop lyric writing, with Chung taking on the lead and titular role as a student with frustrated aspirations to become a lyricist.

Norris Wong conceived the idea for a Cantonpop-themed film in 2019 following her debut project, My Prince Edward. Self-funded by Wong and producer Wong Hoi, pre-production commenced in 2021. Filming took place in Hong Kong and Taiwan over fifteen days from July 2022 to April 2023, with several cast members accepting reduced or pro bono compensation due to budget constraints.

The film premiered at the 20th Hong Kong Asian Film Festival on 12 November 2023, before releasing theatrically on 7 March 2024. It was named as a Film of Merit in the 30th Hong Kong Film Critics Society Awards and Chung was nominated for Best Leading Actress in the 60th Golden Horse Awards and Best Actress in the 42nd Hong Kong Film Awards.

== Plot ==
Law Wing Sze and her best friend Chick, both aspiring lyricists, decide to participate in their school's talent show by rewriting the lyrics of Infernal Affairs' theme song, but their performance gets cancelled as the show is overrun. They cross paths with Mak, a classmate who shares their passion for music and despises the limitations on creativity imposed by the school. Sze then decides to explore external competitions and stumbles upon a lyric writing competition hosted by CASH. Sze enlists Chick's help, as well as two classmates who excel in classical piano and choral singing, to join the competition with the lyrics she has written, but they cannot make it through the longlist. Worse still, Chick informs Sze that her mother has forced her to study abroad in Britain, leaving the duo sadden that Chick will not be able to fulfill her dream.

However, Sze refuses to give up and begins sending cold emails to music composers, inquiring if they need lyricists, but only one composer named Wong Hiu Tung responds. Sze quickly drafts lyrics for Wong's demo, but he never replies again. After completing her A-Levels, Sze enrols in a summer lyric writing course taught by Lo, a struggling lyricist who reluctantly shares the "0243" Cantonese lyric writing method after recognizing Sze's talent. Empowered by this newfound knowledge, Sze starts searching for other songwriters and encounters Chris Lee, an aspiring singer-songwriter who agrees to collaborate with her. Meanwhile, Sze begins attending university and dating her classmate Zeke. Sze also reunites with Mak, who reveals to be the composer Wong Hiu Tung and is actually impressed by her lyrics. While Sze and Zeke are on a trip with their university friends, Chris informs Sze that a Taiwanese record label has shown interest in their demo album and requests her to meet the producers on their behalf during the trip. Despite the label's interest, Zeke is dissatisfied with how Sze prioritizes the meeting over their group and accuses her of selfishly chasing her dreams, leading to their breakup.

Sze channels the emotions from her breakup into writing lyrics and decides to participate in a lyric writing competition jointly organized by Hong Kong record labels. She wins the gold prize and secures a lyricist contract with one of the labels. However, on her way home in a taxi, she hears Chris' song on the radio, but with altered lyrics attributed to a Taiwanese lyricist. Afterwards, Sze receives her first job to write for singer Helencandy's debut album. Sze, frustrated by the betrayal of Chris and desperate for an opportunity, approaches Helencandy and offers to write lyrics for her even for free. As a result of this encounter, Helencandy mistakenly perceives Sze as an untalented novice and criticizes her lyrics after listening to a demo that Sze co-writes with Mak. Wong, infuriated by Sze's overstepping behavior, fires her and suggests that she may not be suitable for a career as a lyricist, especially after she has invested with tremendous effort and dedication.

Feeling disheartened, Sze abandons her dream and starts searching for stable employment to make a living. She applies to work at Hong Kong Free-riders, a newly established ridesharing company, and is interviewed by the company's founder Kan. Kan shares his visions behind founding the company and asks Sze if she has any dreams. Sze honestly expresses her desire to be a lyricist, and Kan happily hires her, assigning her the task of writing lyrics for the company's advertisement song. However, as soon as Sze submits the song to Kan, they receive the news that all drivers have been arrested due to illegal carriage of passengers. The company is forced to shut down. Sze attempts to find Kan to resign, only to discover a devastated Kan sobbing in his room.

Finally, Sze embarks on a working holiday in Taiwan and overhears the demo song she had co-written with Mak playing on the radio in a convenience store. She cries and reaffirms her identity as a lyricist.

== Cast ==
- Chung Suet Ying as Law Wing Sze: a student with frustrated aspirations to become a lyricist.
- Eric Kot as Law Wing Sze's father: the nagging father of Sze who often argues with his wife.
- Anson Chan as Wong "Mak" Hiu Tung: Sze's secondary school classmate who becomes a composer and her creative ally.
- Amy Tang as Maru: Sze's secondary classmate who develops a relationship with her brother.
- Sabrina Ng as Chick: Sze's playful best friend who also aspires to become a lyricist.
- Chu Pak Hong as Wing Lo: a struggling lyricist and the teacher of Sze's summer lyric writing course.
- Ernest Poon as Law Wai Lok: Sze's elder brother who is supportive of her dream.
- Yukki Tai as Zeke: Sze's university boyfriend.

Also appearing in the film are Luna Shaw as Law Wing Sze's mother; Tony Wu as Chris Lee, an amateur singer-songwriter who becomes the first collaborator with Sze; Jeannie Ng as Helencandy, a debut singer; Yeung Wai-lun as Wong, the record producer of Helencandy's new album; Henick Chou and Sheena Chan as William and Piggy, Sze's secondary school classmates; Sica Ho as Creamy, Sze's lyric writing coursemate; Leung Chung-hang as Kan, the founder of Hong Kong Free-riders; Angel Lam and Ken Law as Betty and Ivan, Kan's co-workers; Jessey Tsang as Sister Che, a nun at Sze's secondary school. Taiwanese actors Ma Nien-hsien and Oscar Chiu cameo as Kao and Ko, the manager and assistant of a Taiwanese record label, respectively. Singers Stephy Tang and Jason Chan cameo as themselves. Numerous Cantopop lyricists, including Calvin Poon, Tim Lui, Saville Chan, Pakkin Leung, Cheng Man, Brian Tsang, GingerLemonCola, and Wong Chi Wah (Note: Wong Chi Wah is the inventor of the "0243" Cantonese lyric writing method in real life.) also make cameo appearances either as themselves or in minor roles.

== Production ==
=== Development ===
In 2019, director and writer Norris Wong conceived the idea of producing a film about lyric writing during the premiere of her previous romance film project, My Prince Edward, when she was asked about composing the lyrics for the film's theme song herself. Intrigued by the notion, she shared the story concept with Wong Hoi, a frequent collaborator, and together they decided to produce the film as an independent project funded by themselves. The film had a total budget of HK$2,800,000, with Norris Wong and Wong Hoi each contributing HK$1,000,000, and Norris' share primarily came from her remuneration for My Prince Edward and the Taiwanese Netflix series At the Moment (2023). Following the release of their horror anthology film Let It Ghost in 2022, the duo commenced filming on The Lyricist Wannabe. They established Sonatina Film, and The Lyricist Wannabe is the film company's first production. The film was selected for the Taipei Golden Horse Film Project Promotion in September 2022, and the 21st Hong Kong-Asia Film Financing Forum in March 2023, securing funding of US$15,000 (HK$117,000) for the purchase of filming equipment.

The film was originally titled "填詞撚" in Chinese, but due to the homophonic pronunciation of the word "撚" with a Cantonese profanity, it could not be broadcast or displayed on public posters in Hong Kong. As a result, the production crew decided to rename the film as "填詞L" before its premiere at the Hong Kong Asian Film Festival in September 2023. Wong suggested that the letter "L" could be interpreted in different ways, such as representing "Lyricist", the protagonist Law Wing Sze's name, or a person seating down after a long journey. The film was enlisted in the Taipei Golden Horse Film Project Promotion once again in October 2023. The rights to the film are held by Edko Films, and the distribution rights for the United Kingdom were sold to Trinity CineAsia. An official trailer was released in December 2023.

=== Writing ===
The Lyricist Wannabe is a semi-autobiographical film, and the first motion picture centered around Cantopop lyric writing. Norris Wong penned the screenplay based on her autobiographical novel written in 2013, which chronicled her pursuit of dreams to become a lyricist. The film is divided into seven chapters, each representing a stage in the protagonist's journey towards her dream. The protagonist, Law Wing Sze, based on Wong herself, shares a similar passion for lyric writing that began during secondary school, aspiring to become a lyricist by sending out demos and participating in competitions before pursuing a career in filmmaking. The name "Law Wing Sze" is a homophonic pronunciation of Wong's English name, "Norris". Many scenes in the film draw from Wong's personal experiences and several characters in the film are based on real-life individuals, including Wong's parents, her brother, and her ex-boyfriend. She also intentionally incorporated real and significant elements of Cantopop lyric writing into the film, such as the "0243" writing method. Wong also drew inspiration from Chung Suet Ying's personal experiences, including the practice of earning extra income by selling idol merchandise outside the Hong Kong Coliseum. Wong had not finalized the ending of the screenplay even when filming began, and she based the ending scene on her encounters after relocating to Taiwan.

=== Casting ===
In December 2022, Chung Suet Ying was reported to be attached to the project as the lead actress. In March 2023, Eric Kot, Amy Tang, and Sabrina Ng were cast in leading roles, while Chu Pak Hong, (Note: Chu Pak Hong was credited as co-starring in the final version of the film.) Jessey Tsang, and Taiwanese actor Oscar Chiu were announced to have cameo appearances in the film. In September 2023, Anson Chan, Ernest Poon, Yukki Tai, Tony Wu, Sheena Chan, and Jeannie Ng were announced to be part of the cast. Luna Shaw, Henick Chou, Sica Ho, Stephy Tang, Leung Chung-hang, Yeung Wai-lun and Angel Lam were later revealed to be part of the ensemble through the official trailer released in December 2023.

Norris Wong had a preference for casting actors with music backgrounds in the film. She handpicked Chung Suet Ying, who is a real-life lyricist, during the early stages of production due to the resemblance in their vibes and life experiences to the protagonist Law Wing Sze. Chung immediately agreed upon Wong's invitation, as she had a strong interest in the idea of filming a lyric writing-themed movie. Due to her previous experience as lyricist, Chung improvised lyrics on set during the shooting of a few scenes. Eric Kot, who played the protagonist's father, met Wong during an interview for the 39th Hong Kong Film Awards. Wong invited Kot to join the cast because she found that Kot exuded energy very similar to her own father and highly experienced in acting. Kot agreed on the spot after reading the scripts. Anson Chan, initially cast for a cameo role, had his part significantly expanded by Wong during the production, ultimately making him the male lead. Wong also cast members from YouTube sketch comedy groups, including Amy Tang, Sabrina Ng, and Ernest Poon. Ng, who knew Wong prior to the film, was invited to portray a character based on a real-life person who shares similarities with her. Poon, who made his feature film debut, was cast in a dramatic role and requested by Wong not to portray the character in a comical way, contrasting with his comedic reputation on the YouTube channel Trial & Error.

The Cantopop lyricists' cameo appearances were pro bono, and several actors were cast with a lower remuneration, participating in the project solely out of friendship. Henick Chou, who was a friend of the assistant director, as well as Stephy Tang and Chu Pak Hong, who collaborated with Norris Wong in My Prince Edward, were also cast in the film. Chu, portraying an always-criticizing lyric writing teacher, noted that Wong had granted him more creative freedom in this project, enabling him to draw inspiration from snobby seniors he had encountered in his life and depict the character comically.

=== Filming ===
Principal photography began in July 2022 after a year of pre-production. Although the filming period in Hong Kong spanned approximately seven months, the crew actually only spent fifteen days on set. Due to budget constraints, the crew selected mostly free filming locations, including Lung Wah Hotel, which sponsored the film, and a cafe owned by Norris Wong's friend. The three office scenes in the film, including the Hong Kong Free-riders office, the record producing studio, and the radio station office, were all shot in the same location within a single day. Most of the secondary school scenes were filmed at St. Stephen's College, the alma mater of producer Wong Hoi, who also managed the venue bookings, and these scenes were completed in two days. Filming also took place at the Hong Kong Coliseum and the Chinese University of Hong Kong. The crew then moved to northern Taiwan to continue the shoot. However, one of the filming days unexpectedly had rain, which forced Wong to modify the script. Filming ultimately wrapped up in April 2023. Scenes that involved the protagonist's imagination and the visualization of lyrics were achieved through post-production animation.

=== Music ===
The film's original soundtrack was composed by Wong Kin Wai, with lyrics penned by Norris Wong. The theme song of the film, titled "A Lyricist Wannabe", was composed and performed by independent singer Ngayi Tse, with lyrics also written by Norris Wong. Wong explained that her intention in writing lyrics for the soundtrack was to secure a nomination as a lyricist in the Hong Kong Film Awards. Additionally, my little airport's "The OK Thing to Do on Sunday Afternoon Is to Toddle in the Zoo" was featured in the film.

== Release ==
The Lyricist Wannabe premiered as the closing film of the 20th Hong Kong Asian Film Festival on 12 November 2023, and was selected for the Special Focus section at the 19th Osaka Asian Film Festival. Broadway Cinematheque scheduled eight earlybird screenings on 16 December 2023, followed by the theatrical release of the film in Hong Kong on 7 March 2024. Internationally, the film was released on 15 and 22 March 2024, in the United Kingdom and Taiwan, respectively. It was also selected for screening at the 26th Far East Film Festival.

== Reception ==
=== Box office ===
The Lyricist Wannabe grossed HK$0.55 million on its first day of release, directly ascending to the top of the box office in Hong Kong. It received approximately HK$2 million by the end of the first week, and accumulated a total gross of just under HK$4 million by the third weekend. Due to positive reviews, the film's box office continued to surge, reaching HK$4.5 million by the fourth week. On 6 April 2024, Norris Wong announced that the film had surpassed the $5.26 million mark at the box office, surpassing the total gross of her previous debut project, My Prince Edward.

=== Critical response ===
Phil Hoad of The Guardian gave the film 3/5 stars and acknowledged the poignant exploration of the emotional risks in pursuing dreams within the cutthroat Cantopop industry, while its journal-style aesthetic and seamless integration of songs contribute to its intimate and enriching storytelling. Edmund Lee of South China Morning Post gave the film 4/5 stars and praised its technical insight into Cantopop lyric writing, which adds poignancy to the frustrated dreams and continuous struggles of the underdog protagonist, with a charismatic performance delivered by emerging actress Chung Suet Ying. Lee also ranked the film fourth out of the 36 Hong Kong films theatrically released in 2024.

Sek Kei focused on the technicality of Cantonpop lyric writing and complimented the film for its interesting depiction of the implication of numerical codes to word pronunciations in Cantonese, claiming that this unique phenomenon of lyrics not fitting the music notes can arouse resonance and laughter among the Hong Kong audience, and praised the casting choice of Chung Suet Ying, who delivered a convincing performance due to her previous career as a lyricist. Keith Ho, writing for HK01, lauded the performances of the ensemble cast and the evocative portrayal of a realistic tragedy that prompted contemplation on the choice between accepting reality or persevering in the pursuit of dreams. Dennis Chan of Ming Pao shared a similar view with Sek and Ho, commenting that the film is a touching tale of failure in the pursuit of a dream, with an additional resonance that captivated the Hong Kong audience due to its heavy depiction on Cantonese linguistics.

== Awards and nominations ==
Year	Award	Category	Nominee	Result	Ref.
2023	60th Golden Horse Awards	Best Leading Actress	Chung Suet Ying	Nominated	
2023	60th Golden Horse Awards	Best Adapted Screenplay	Norris Wong	Nominated	
2024	30th Hong Kong Film Critics Society Awards	Films of Merit	—N/a	Won	
2024	30th Hong Kong Film Critics Society Awards	Best Actress	Chung Suet Ying	Nominated	
2024	Hong Kong Screenwriters' Guild Awards 2023	Best Movie Character of the Year	Chung Suet Ying	Nominated	
2024	42nd Hong Kong Film Awards	Best Actress	Chung Suet Ying	Nominated	
2024	42nd Hong Kong Film Awards	Best Original Film Score	Wong Kin Wai	Nominated	
2024	42nd Hong Kong Film Awards	Best Original Film Song	"A Lyricist Wannabe"	Won	
