= Angel Lam =

Angel Lam may refer to:

- Angel Lam (composer), New York-based Hong Kong-born composer and writer
- Angel Lam (actress), Hong Kong actress and model
