= Time Still Turns the Pages =

2023 Hong Kong film by Nick Cheuk

- Theatrical release poster
- Traditional Chinese: 年少日記
- Jyutping: Nin^{4} Siu^{3} Jat^{6} Gei^{3}
- Directed by: Nick Cheuk
- Screenplay by: Nick Cheuk
- Produced by: Derek Yee
- Starring: Siuyea Lo; Ronald Cheng
- Cinematography: Meteor Cheung
- Edited by: Keith Chan; Nick Cheuk
- Music by: Hanz Au; Iris Liu; Jolyon Cheung
- Production company: Roundtable Pictures
- Distributed by: mm2 Studios Hong Kong
- Release dates: 11 June 2023 (SIFF); 16 November 2023 (Hong Kong)
- Running time: 95 minutes
- Country: Hong Kong
- Language: Cantonese

Time Still Turns the Pages (Chinese: 年少日記) is a 2023 Hong Kong drama film directed and co-written by Nick Cheuk and produced by Derek Yee, marking Cheuk's directorial debut as part of the First Feature Film Initiative. Starring Siuyea Lo and Ronald Cheng, the film follows a secondary school teacher (Lo) who confronts a childhood trauma caused by academic pressure from his father (Cheng) while helping a suicidal student.

Cheuk wrote the screenplay in response to student suicides in Hong Kong in 2015, drawing heavily on the real-life experience of a friend who took his own life and who was also a mutual friend of Siuyea Lo. The project was greenlit in 2019 as part of the First Feature Film Initiative, with rewrites occurring in 2020 and principal photography taking place in 2021, primarily at Chiu Yang Por Yen Primary School.

The film had its world premiere at the 25th Shanghai International Film Festival on 11 June 2023, followed by a theatrical release in Hong Kong on 16 November. It received five and twelve nominations in the 60th Golden Horse Awards and 42nd Hong Kong Film Awards, respectively, with Nick Cheuk winning Best New Director at both ceremonies.

== Plot ==
The film opens with a child named Cheng Yau-kit, who aspires to become a teacher, sitting despairingly on the rooftop of a condo.

In modern times, a secondary school teacher named Cheng punishes a hearing-impaired student, Vincent, for pushing another student down the staircase. When Cheng attempts to counsel him, Vincent scoffs and tells Cheng to handle his own divorce issues first. Cheng then discovers a suicide note in the classroom rubbish bin. He reports it to the headmaster, but the vice principal advises him to ignore it to avoid affecting the students' preparation for the upcoming university entrance exams. In desperation, Cheng asks Ka-yee, the class monitor, to help identify students who may be contemplating suicide.

The film then transitions to a flashback: Cheng Yau-kit, the son of renowned barrister Cheng Chi-hung, is a well-educated but academically challenged schoolboy. His younger brother, Cheng Yau-chun, is a prodigy who excels in both academics and music. Yau-kit tries hard to improve his grades, even starting a diary to appease his father after hearing a respected educator advise Yau-chun that diary writing can aid language learning. Despite his efforts, Yau-kit's grades remain poor, frustrating his father, who blames Yau-kit for not working hard enough and for spending too much time reading manga, leading him to punish Yau-kit by throwing away his manga books. Despite their conflicts, Chi-hung promises Yau-kit a trip to Disneyland in California if he can rank in the top 15 in class, based on Yau-kit's mother Heidi's suggestion. However, Yau-kit's performance worsens, and he ranks second to last, forcing him to repeat the grade. Enraged, Yau-kit is severely beaten by his father, while Yau-chun quietly studies nearby.

To cheer up his brother, Yau-chun takes Yau-kit to buy toys and play on the rooftop, but they are caught and Heidi scolds Yau-kit only. When Yau-kit anticipates punishment from his father, he is surprised by Chi-hung's calm demeanor, as Chi-hung claims he has given up on Yau-kit and will no longer waste effort guiding him. Realising his family is going to California without him, Yau-kit tries to hug Yau-chun, who responds casually, saying he will bring souvenirs back. Believing his family would be happier without him, Yau-kit commits suicide. After receiving the news, the family is devastated. Chi-hung refuses to reveal the truth and pretends Yau-kit died from an illness, while he sinks into depression and guilt. Heidi, overwhelmed by grief, leaves the family. Yau-chun is traumatised and feels regretful for not reaching out to Yau-kit, focusing solely on appeasing his parents and teachers while looking down on Yau-kit due to the academically inclined environment he grew up in. This leads him to become rebellious and decide to fulfill Yau-kit's dream of becoming a teacher.

Back in the present, it is revealed that the teacher Cheng is actually Yau-chun, who has not communicated with his father for a long time, blaming him for his brother's death. He finally visits Chi-hung, who is now terminally ill. The two embrace, crying together as they express their shared guilt and regret over Yau-kit's death, which has haunted them for years. After Chi-hung passes away soon afterwards, Yau-chun writes down his story in Yau-kit's diary and gives it to his estranged wife, Sherry, explaining his panic upon learning of her pregnancy and hoping she can share their story through her radio drama program. On graduation day, Cheng leaves his phone number for his students and bids them farewell, ultimately receiving a text message from the student who wrote the suicide note, seeking counseling from him.

== Cast ==
- Siuyea Lo as Mr. Cheng / Alan Cheng Yau-chun, a traumatised secondary school teacher who grew up in a strict household with overwhelming academic pressure
  - Curtis Ho and Yukki Tai as younger versions of Cheng Yau-chun
- Ronald Cheng as Cheng Chi-hung, a senior counsel and a stern and abusive father
- Sean Wong as Eli Cheng Yau-kit, an academically incompetent schoolboy from a strict, upper-middle-class family
- Rosa Maria Velasco as Heidi Cheng, the Cheng siblings' long-suffering mother from her abusive husband
- Hanna Chan as Sherry Lam Suet-yee, a voice actress and the wife of Mr. Cheng
  - Nancy Kwai as a younger version of Sherry Lam Suet-yee
- Henick Chou as Vincent, a hearing-impaired student of Mr. Cheng who was bullied at school
- Sabrina Ng as Wong Ka-yee, the monitor of Mr. Cheng's class

Also appearing in the film are Rachel Leung as Zoey, the secretary of Cheng Chi-hung; Luna Shaw as Sister Ha, a social worker; Koyi Mak as Miss Leung, the Cheng siblings' class teacher; and Joey Leung as the vice principal. Jessica Chan and Peter Chan cameo as the piano teachers of Cheng Yau-kit.

== Production ==
=== Development ===
Director and writer Nick Cheuk originally penned the screenplay in 2015, based on the death of a close friend and university classmate. He later made revisions to the script, altering certain aspects of his friend's experiences to explore the social phenomenon of student suicides in Hong Kong. He completed the first draft in 2019, initially titled Suicide Note. During the same year, he applied for and received funding from the Hong Kong Film Development Council's First Feature Film Initiative. He dedicated two years to rewriting and fine-tuning the script. In 2020, Derek Yee returned to Hong Kong after filming in Mongolia and joined Cheuk in revising the script. Cheuk retitled the film as Time Still Turns the Pages, drawing inspiration from the lyrics of Avenged Sevenfold's "So Far Away". Movie critic and secondary school teacher Chan Kwong-lung was also invited to be a consultant for the film. After filming, Cheuk and Keith Chan, both first-time film editors, spent an additional two years on post-production. An official trailer was released on 27 September 2023.

=== Casting ===
In September 2021, shortly after finishing the screenplay draft, Cheuk approached Siuyea Lo, a mutual friend of his and his deceased friend, and offered him the role of Mr. Cheng. The original setting of Mr. Cheng was actually 40 years old and spoke in a much more mature manner. Lo accepted the role on the spot after reading the script, and Cheuk amended the settings for him. Besides, Cheuk handpicked comedian actor Ronald Cheng for the role of a stubborn and abusive father, after seeing Louis Cheung's performance in The Narrow Road and wanting to bring out the emotional side of actors who appear comedic. Cheuk also chose Henick Chou to portray Vincent, a character based on his own experiences growing up at school, as he found Chou's previous portrayals of slacker youths very convincing. Child actor Sean Wong won his role through an audition.

=== Filming ===
Principal photography began in 2021 and wrapped up in 19 days. Most of the school scenes were filmed at Chiu Yang Por Yen Primary School, Tin Shui Wai, and the farewell scene between Cheng and Sherry was filmed at an art store in Sham Shui Po.

== Release ==
Time Still Turns the Pages had its world premiere in the Asian New Talent section of the 25th Shanghai International Film Festival on 11 June 2023. The film was also screened as the opening film of 20th Hong Kong Asian Film Festival on 13 October 2023, and in World Focus section of the 36th Tokyo International Film Festival. It was released theatrically on 16 November 2023 in Hong Kong.

== Reception ==
=== Box office ===
Time Still Turns the Pages initially grossed approximately HK$1.93 million during its first weekend, not making it to the top three at the box office. After receiving positive reviews from critics, the film saw a significant boost and climbed to HK$4.15 million, surpassing Napoleon, Trolls Band Together, Sound of Freedom, and local production In Broad Daylight, securing the top position at the box office. By the fourth weekend, the film had grossed over HK$16 million, and surpassed HK$25 million by the eighth weekend, making it the second highest-grossing film of 2023 in Hong Kong. As of 19 February 2024, the film's total gross stood at over HK$27 million. It was the second highest-grossing Hong Kong film domestically in 2023.

=== Critical response ===
Edmund Lee of South China Morning Post gave the film 4/5 stars and lauded the film for its powerful emotional impact, crediting Siuyea Lo's impressive performance as Mr. Cheng and the execution of a clever plot twist that effectively convey layers of emotion within the film's poignant and heavy-hearted tone. Lee also ranked the film second out of the 37 Hong Kong films theatrically released in 2023. Mátin Cheung of The Student gave the film 4/5 stars and acknowledged Cheuk's thoughtful utilization of a complex narrative structure to reveal the harsh realities of Hong Kong's ailing education system and suffocating household atmosphere, while simultaneously challenging audience biases and presenting the talent of the new generation of Hong Kong filmmakers.

Phuong Le of The Guardian gave the film 3/5 stars, praising director Nick Cheuk's sensitive portrayal of taboo topics like childhood abuse and academic pressure, as the film skillfully explored a debilitating cycle of trauma through the intertwined stories of a high school teacher and a young boy. Alan Chu of United Daily News also found the film to powerfully address themes of personal and societal trauma through its intricate storytelling and emotional depth, making it a poignant reflection on contemporary Hong Kong.

Keith Ho, writing for HK01, referred to the film as the best film of 2023, commending its excellent script and performances while effectively exploring themes of communication and the emotional struggles of its characters. Estella Huang of Mirror Media perceived the film as a profound and emotionally resonant work, exploring melancholic childhoods and the limitations of education with depth and nuance through the adept navigation of Cheuk.

== Awards and nominations ==
Year	Award	Category	Nominee	Result	Ref.
2023	60th Golden Horse Awards	Best Narrative Feature	—N/a	Nominated	
2023	60th Golden Horse Awards	Best Supporting Actor	Sean Wong	Nominated	
2023	60th Golden Horse Awards	Best New Director	Nick Cheuk	Won	
2023	60th Golden Horse Awards	Best Original Screenplay	Nick Cheuk	Nominated	
2023	60th Golden Horse Awards	Best Film Editing	Keith Chan, Nick Cheuk	Nominated	
2023	60th Golden Horse Awards	Audience Choice Award	—N/a	Won	
2023	60th Golden Horse Awards	FIPRESCI Prize	—N/a	Nominated	
2024	30th Hong Kong Film Critics Society Awards	Best Film	—N/a	Nominated	
2024	30th Hong Kong Film Critics Society Awards	Best Director	Nick Cheuk	Nominated	
2024	30th Hong Kong Film Critics Society Awards	Best Screenplay	Nick Cheuk	Nominated	
2024	30th Hong Kong Film Critics Society Awards	Best Actor	Sean Wong	Nominated	
2024	30th Hong Kong Film Critics Society Awards	Films of Merit	—N/a	Won	
2024	17th Asian Film Awards	Best Supporting Actor	Sean Wong	Nominated	
2024	17th Asian Film Awards	Best New Director	Nick Cheuk	Won	
2024	17th Asian Film Awards	Best Editor	Nick Cheuk, Keith Chan	Nominated	
2024	2023 Hong Kong Screenwriters' Guild Awards	Best Movie Character of the Year	Sean Wong	Nominated	
2024	42nd Hong Kong Film Awards	Best Film	—N/a	Nominated	
2024	42nd Hong Kong Film Awards	Best Director	Nick Cheuk	Nominated	
2024	42nd Hong Kong Film Awards	Best Screenplay	Nick Cheuk	Nominated	
2024	42nd Hong Kong Film Awards	Best Actor	Siuyea Lo	Nominated	
2024	42nd Hong Kong Film Awards	Best Supporting Actor	Sean Wong	Nominated	
2024	42nd Hong Kong Film Awards	Best Supporting Actress	Rosa Maria Velasco	Nominated	
2024	42nd Hong Kong Film Awards	Best New Performer	Curtis Ho	Nominated	
2024	42nd Hong Kong Film Awards	Best Cinematography	Meteor Cheung	Nominated	
2024	42nd Hong Kong Film Awards	Best Editing	Keith Chan, Nick Cheuk	Nominated	
2024	42nd Hong Kong Film Awards	Best Art Direction	Irving Cheung	Nominated	
2024	42nd Hong Kong Film Awards	Best Original Film Score	Hanz Au, Iris Liu, Jolyon Cheung	Nominated	
2024	42nd Hong Kong Film Awards	Best New Director	Nick Cheuk	Won	
