= 39th Hong Kong Film Awards =

2020 Hong Kong Film Awards

- Poster
- Date: 6 May 2020
- Hosted by: Derek Yee
- Organised by: Hong Kong Film Awards Association

Highlights
- Best Film: Better Days
- Best Director: Derek Tsang; Better Days
- Best Actor: Tai Bo; Suk Suk
- Best Actress: Zhou Dongyu; Better Days
- Most awards: Better Days (8)
- Most nominations: Better Days (12)

Television coverage
- Network: YouTube and Facebook

The 39th Hong Kong Film Awards presentation ceremony took place at the Hong Kong Cultural Centre in April 2020, but it was moved online due to preventive measures against COVID-19 and it was livestreamed on May 6, 2020. The awards were handed out on the 17th July 2022 at the 40th Hong Kong Film Awards

== Winners and nominees ==
Winners are listed first, highlighted in boldface, and indicated with a double dagger ‡.

| **Best Film**: **Jojo Hui — Better Days** ‡; Michael J. Werner, Teresa Kwong, Sandy Yip, Chowee Leow — Suk Suk; Ann Hui, Julia Chu — Fagara; Soi Cheang — I'm Livin' It; Stephen Chow, Y. Y. Kong — The New King of Comedy | **Best Director**: **Derek Tsang — Better Days** ‡; Kiwi Chow — Beyond The Dream; Ray Yeung — Suk Suk; Heiward Mak — Fagara; Wilson Yip — Ip Man 4: The Finale |
| **Best Screenplay**: **Lam Wing Sum, Li Yuan, Xu Yimeng — Better Days** ‡; Felix Tsang, Kiwi Chow — Beyond The Dream; Ray Yeung — Suk Suk; Heiward Mak — Fagara; Norris Wong— My Prince Edward | **Best Actor**: **Tai Bo — Suk Suk** ‡; Louis Koo — A Witness Out Of The Blue; Chu Pak Hong — My Prince Edward; Aaron Kwok — I'm Livin' It; Jackson Yee — Better Days |
| **Best Actress**: **Zhou Dongyu — Better Days** ‡; Sammi Cheng — Fagara; Sammi Cheng — Fatal Visit; Cecilia Choi — Beyond The Dream; Stephy Tang — My Prince Edward | **Best Supporting Actor**: **Cheung Tat Ming — I'm Livin' It** ‡; Philip Keung — A Witness Out Of The Blue; Siuyea Lo — Suk Suk; Alex Man — I'm Livin' It; Zhang Qi — The New King of Comedy |
| **Best Supporting Actress**: **Patra Au — Suk Suk** ‡; Charlene Choi — Fatal Visit; Megan Lai — Fagara; Nina Paw — My Prince Edward; Cya Liu — I'm Livin' It | **Best New Performer**: **Jackson Yee — Better Days** ‡; E Jingwen — The New King of Comedy; Vanda Margraf — Ip Man 4: The Finale; Patra Au — Suk Suk; Terrance Lau — Beyond The Dream |
| **Best Cinematography**: **Yu Jing Pin — Better Days** ‡; Szeto Yat Lui — Beyond The Dream; Tse Chung To Kenny — A Witness Out Of The Blue; S.K. Yip — Fagara; Cheng Siu Keung — Ip Man 4: The Finale | **Best Film Editing**: **Cheung Ka Fai — Ip Man 4: The Finale** ‡; Zhang Yibo — Better Days; Law Wing Cheong, Kelvin Chau— A Witness Out Of The Blue; William Chang Suk Ping, Nose Chan Chui Hing — Suk Suk; William Chang Suk Ping, Peter Chung — My Prince Edward |
| **Best Art Direction**: **Cheung Siu Hong — Fagara** ‡; Liang Honghu — Better Days; Chet Chan — A Witness Out Of The Blue; Man Lim Chung, Li Kwok Lam Billy — I'm Livin' It; Kenneth Mak — Ip Man 4: The Finale | **Best Costume & Make Up Design**: **Dora Ng — Better Days** ‡; Albert Poon — Suk Suk; Cheung Siu Hong — Fagara; Man Lim Chung, Chan Po Yan Polly — I'm Livin' It; Lee Pik Kwan — Ip Man 4: The Finale |
| **Best Action Choreography**: **Yuen Woo-ping — Ip Man 4: The Finale** ‡; Jack Wong — A Witness Out of the Blue; Chin Ka Lok, Ka Lok Stunt Team, Wong Wai Fai, Tang Sui Wa, Thomson Ng — Line Walker 2: Invisible Spy; Stephen Tung — Double World; Hon Ping, Gobi Ng — The White Storm 2: Drug Lords | **Best Original Film Score**: **Eman Lam — My Prince Edward** ‡; Varqa Buehrer — Better Days; Yusuke Hatano — Say It Properly; Peter Kam — I'm Livin' It; Kenji Kawai — Ip Man 4: The Finale |
| **Best Original Film Song**: **"Fly" — Better Days** ‡; **Composer: Ellen Joyce Loo**; **Lyrics: Ellen Joyce Loo, Ellen Joyce Loo**; **Performer: Yoyo Sham**; "Say It Properly" — Fagara; Composer: Tonyi Ng; Lyrics: Tonyi Ng; Performer: Sammi Cheng; "My Prince Edward" — My Prince Edward; Composer: Eman Lam; Lyrics: Norris Wong; Performer: Stephy Tang; "Brotherhood" — The White Storm 2: Drug Lords; Composer: Jacky Cai; Lyrics: Andy Lau; Performer: Andy Lau, Louis Koo; "i’m livin’ it" — I’m Livin’ It; Composer: Peter Kam; Lyrics: Siu May; Performer: Aaron Kwok | **Best Sound Design**: **Lee Yiu Keung George, Yiu Chun Hin — Ip Man 4: The Finale** ‡; Victor Ray Ennis — The Captain; Tu Duu-Chih, Wu Shu-Yao — Beyond The Dream; Tu Duu-Chih, Chiang Yi Chen — Fagara; Nip Kei Wing, Ip Siu Kei — The White Storm 2: Drug Lords |
| **Best Visual Effects**: **Yee Kwok Leung, Ma Siu Fu, Leung Wai Man, Ho Man Lok — The White Storm 2: Drug Lords** ‡; Ellen Poon — The Captain; Tam Kai Kwan, Ng Ka Lung, Chung Kar Hau, Yeung Hey Chiu — Line Walker 2: Invisible Spy; Eric Xu, Allen Wei, Li Shuai — Double World; Victor Wong — The Bravest | **Best New Director**: **Norris Wong — My Prince Edward** ‡; Jazz Boon — Line Walker 2: Invisible Spy; Wong Hing Fan — I’m Livin’ It; Nick Leung Kwok-Pun — Lion Rock; Cheuk Cheung — Bamboo Theatre |
**Best Asian Chinese Language Film**: **An Elephant Sitting Still** (China) ‡; Detention (Taiwan); Shadow (China)

== Films that received multiple awards and nominations ==
Films that received multiple nominations
| Nominations | Film |
|---|---|
| 12 | Better Days |
| 11 | Fagara |
| 10 | I'm Livin' It |
| 9 | Suk Suk |
| 9 | Ip Man 4: The Finale |
| 8 | My Prince Edward |
| 6 | Beyond The Dream |
| 6 | A Witness Out of the Blue |
| 4 | The White Storm 2: Drug Lords |
| 3 | The New King of Comedy |
| 3 | Line Walker 2: Invisible Spy |
| 2 | Fatal Visit |
| 2 | Double World |
| 2 | The Captain |
