= Luna Shaw =

Hong Kong stage actress (born 1973)

- 邵美君
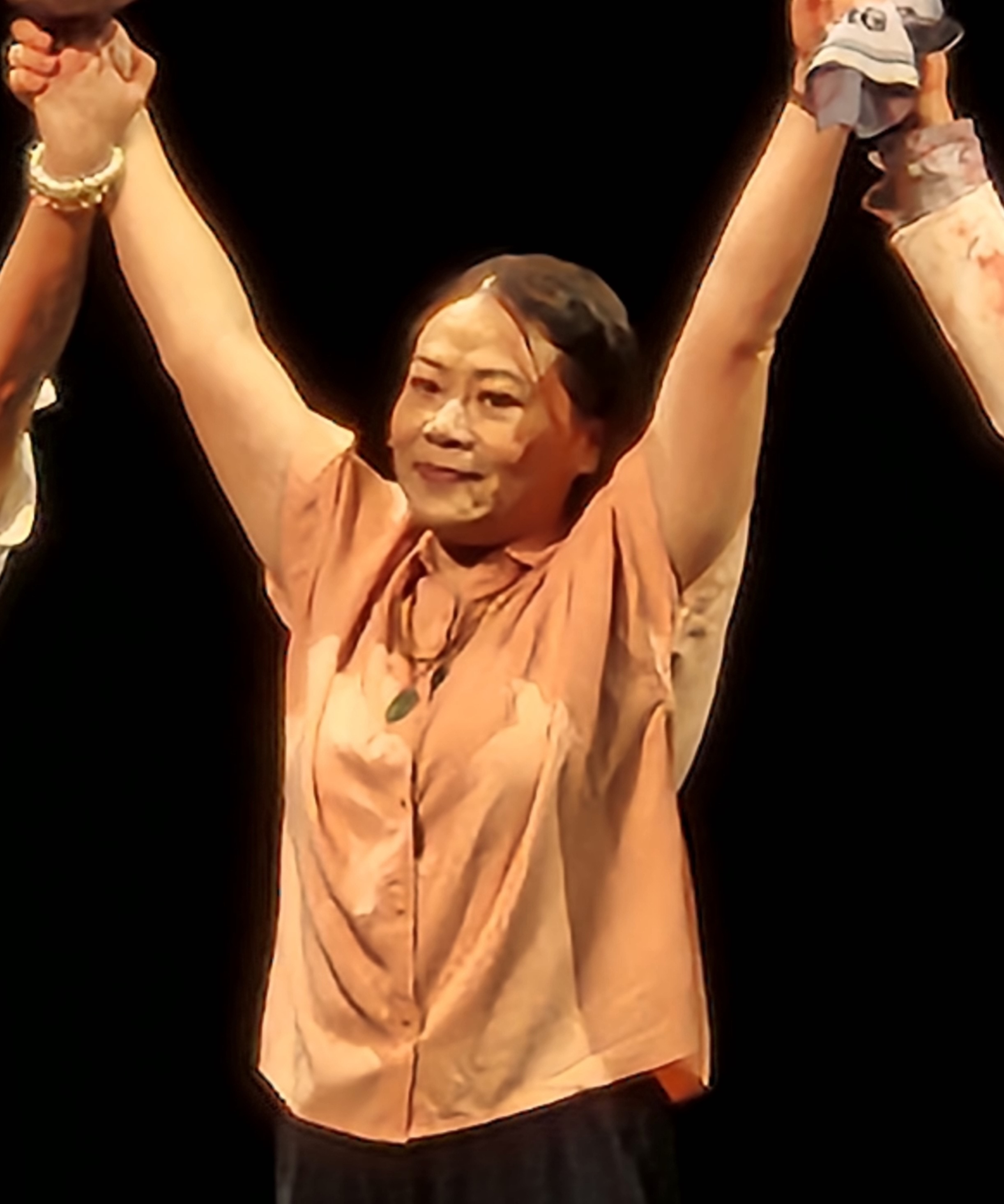
- Shaw in August 2023
- Born: Shaw Mei-kwan; 1973 (age 52–53); Hong Kong
- Education: Hong Kong Academy for Performing Arts (HD)
- Occupation: Actress
- Years active: 1999–present

Luna Shaw Mei-kwan (Chinese: 邵美君; born 1973) is a Hong Kong stage actress best known for her role in Love is Shit (2012). She won eight Hong Kong Drama Awards, which makes her the actress with the most wins for the accolade.

== Biography ==
Shaw was born in 1973. She had her secondary education at Kiangsu-Chekiang College and became interested in drama after having classes with Poon Wai-Sum, a scriptwriter and the artist-in-residence. She attended the Hong Kong Academy for Performing Arts to study acting, but dropped out in her second year due to family issues. She reapplied to the school three years later after her father's death under the motivation of Poon and her elder sister. She graduated with a higher diploma in 1999 and landed her first stage acting role in the play Non Dimenticar (Chinese: 年年有今日). She won Best Supporting Actress in the 11th Hong Kong Drama Awards in 2002 and formed the Windmill Grass Theatre (Chinese: 風車草劇團) with Joey Leung and Edmond Tong. She won a total of eight Hong Kong Drama Awards, most notably winning Best Actress in the 2012 original stage play Love is Shit, which makes her the actress with the most wins for the accolade. Shaw received her first onscreen role in the 2020 ViuTV drama series The Gutter and featured in the 2023 drama film Time Still Turns the Pages. In 2024, she was cast in lead roles in the crime thriller film The Moon Thieves and drama film The Lyricist Wannabe.

== Filmography ==
=== Film ===
Year	Title	Role	Notes/Ref.
2023	Time Still Turns the Pages	Sister Ha (蝦姐)	
2024	The Moon Thieves	Ms. Hong (紅姐)	
2024	The Lyricist Wannabe	Law Wing Sze's mother	
2024	All Shall Be Well	Yvonne	

=== Television ===
Year	Title	Role	Notes/Ref.
2020	The Gutter	Wu Choi Wan (胡彩雲)	Guest role

== Awards and nominations ==
Year	Award	Category	Work	Result	Ref.
1998	7th Hong Kong Drama Awards	Best Supporting Actress	See You Soon	Nominated	
2000	9th Hong Kong Drama Awards	Best Actress	Cricket in My Life	Nominated	
2001	10th Hong Kong Drama Awards	Best Supporting Actress	The Naked Eyes	Nominated	
2002	11th Hong Kong Drama Awards	Best Supporting Actress	The Black Comedy	Won	
2002	11th Hong Kong Drama Awards	Best Actress	Spiders in Meditation	Nominated	
2003	12th Hong Kong Drama Awards	Best Actress	K For	Nominated	
2003	12th Hong Kong Drama Awards	Best Actress	Hobson's Choice	Nominated	
2003	12th Hong Kong Drama Awards	Best Actress	Venezia Cafe in Portland Street	Nominated	
2004	13th Hong Kong Drama Awards	Best Actress	Dragonhead	Nominated	
2005	14th Hong Kong Drama Awards	Best Supporting Actress	Tiger Crane Style	Won	
2006	15th Hong Kong Drama Awards	Best Supporting Actress	Superman Forever	Won	
2006	15th Hong Kong Drama Awards	Best Actress	I Love You, You're Perfect, Now Change!	Nominated	
2007	16th Hong Kong Drama Awards	Best Actress	The Massage King	Nominated	
2010	19th Hong Kong Drama Awards	Best Supporting Actress	Shadow Box	Won	
2012	21st Hong Kong Drama Awards	Best Actress	Love is Shit	Won	
2015	24th Hong Kong Drama Awards	Best Supporting Actress	Shuraba	Won	
2017	26th Hong Kong Drama Awards	Best Actress	Almost, Maine	Won	
2019	28th Hong Kong Drama Awards	Best Actress	Boy Gets Girl	Nominated	
2020	29th Hong Kong Drama Awards	Best Actress	The Good Person of Szechwan	Won	
2023	31st Hong Kong Drama Awards	Best Actress	Bye-Bye Your Tale	Nominated	
