= Angel Lam (actress) =

Hong Kong actress and model (born 1992/1993)

- 林千渟
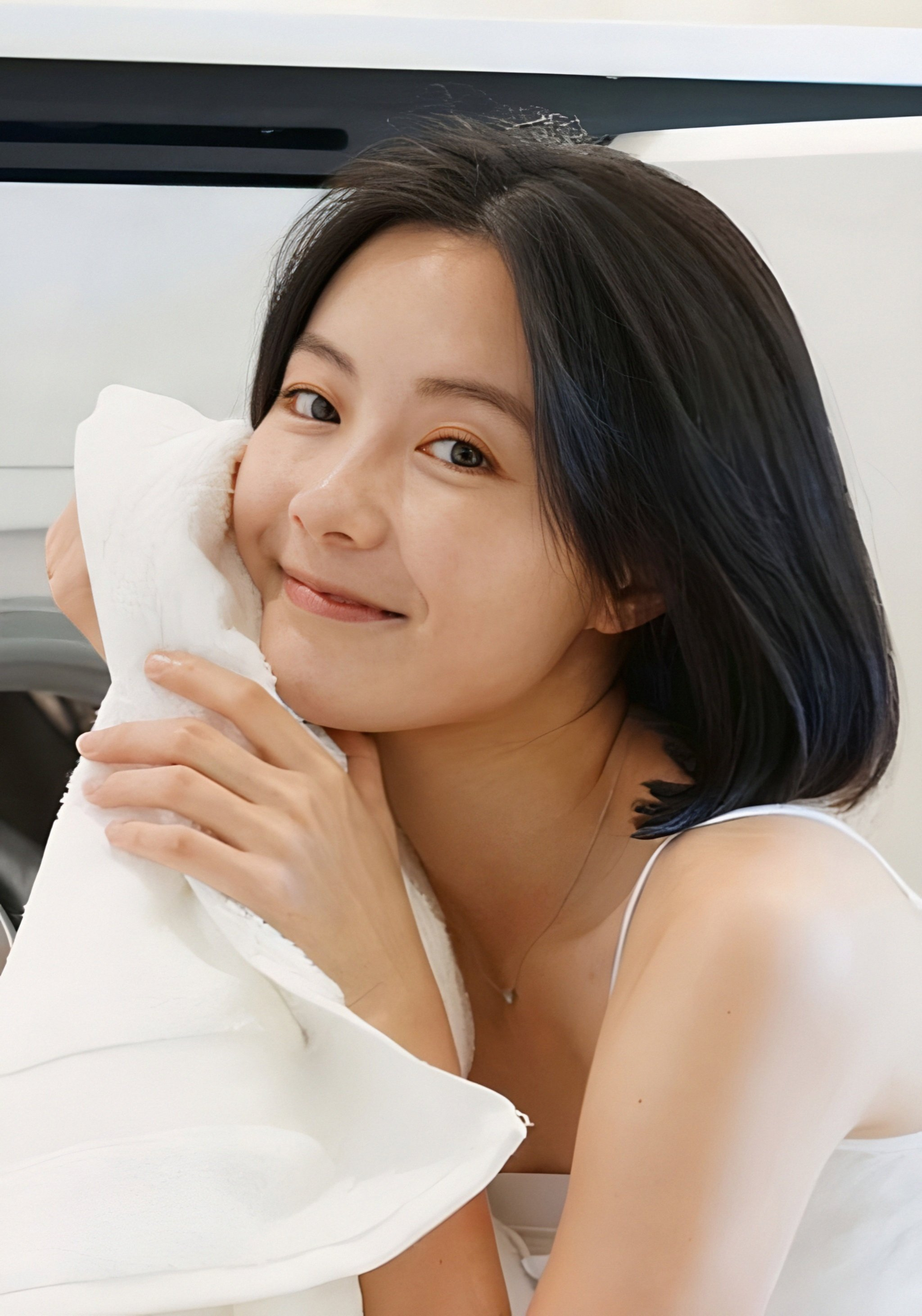
- Lam in June 2021
- Born: Lam Chin-ting; 1992 or 1993 (age 33–34); Hong Kong
- Occupations: Actress; model
- Years active: 2019–present

Angel Lam Chin-ting (Chinese: 林千渟; born 1992/1993) is a Hong Kong actress and model best known for her role in the ViuTV miniseries Lovesignal (2022) and as younger Irene Wan in the autobiographical film Lonely Eighteen (2023).

== Biography ==
Lam was born in 1992 or 1993. She made her debut as a model in 2015 after appearing in an advertisement for finance company Promise Co. In 2017, Lam began to host the ViuTV horror-themed variety show The Haunted Rooms. She hosted all four seasons of the show until 2019 and began to gain public recognition. In the same year, she joined the cast of the ViuTV sci-fi anthology series The Republic in a recurring role. She discovered her interest in acting after participating in the television production and decided to switch careers, joining Louis Koo's acting agency, One Cool Jam Cast. Lam then attended an acting course taught by Louis Cheung, and began starring in music videos, including Serrini's "Pure and True".

In 2022, Lam made her onscreen debut in Norris Wong's segment of the three-part horror anthology film Let It Ghost. She landed one of the three co-leading roles in the ViuTV romance miniseries Lovesignal, starring alongside Anson Chan and Jeannie Ng in the following year. She was also handpicked by Irene Wan to portray her younger self in Wan's 2023 autobiographical film Lonely Eighteen. In 2024, Lam had a minor role in the drama film The Lyricist Wannabe, and landed a lead role as Marble in the crime drama film The Unwavering Brotherhood. She was cast in a main role in the upcoming crime thriller film Beyond The Sin, starring alongside Louis Koo and Gordon Lam as a young girl with polio.

== Filmography ==
=== Film ===
Year	Title	Role	Notes/Ref.
2022	Let It Ghost	Fong (阿芳)	
2023	Lonely Eighteen	Elaine	
2024	The Lyricist Wannabe	Betty	
2024	The Unwavering Brotherhood	Marble (波子)	
TBA	Beyond The Sin	TBA	

=== Television ===
Year	Title	Role	Notes/Ref.
2019	The Republic	Angel	Recurring role
2022	Lovesignal	Ling	Main role

=== Variety shows ===
Year	Title	Notes/Ref.
2017–2019	The Haunted Rooms	Host; season 1—4
2020	Staycation	Host
