= Fagara (film) =

2019 Hong Kong film by Heiward Mak

- Film poster
- Directed by: Heiward Mak
- Screenplay by: Heiward Mak
- Based on: 我的愛如此麻辣 by Amy Cheung
- Produced by: Ann Hui; Julia Chu
- Starring: Sammi Cheng; Megan Lai; Li Xiaofeng
- Cinematography: Yip Shiu Kei
- Edited by: Heiward Mak; Chung Siu-hong
- Music by: Yusuke Hatano
- Production companies: Media Asia Film; Emperor Motion Pictures; Beijing Lajin Entertainment; Dadi Film
- Distributed by: Media Asia Film
- Release dates: 6 September 2019 (China); 12 September 2019 (Hong Kong)
- Running time: 118 minutes
- Country: Hong Kong
- Languages: Cantonese; Mandarin

Fagara (Chinese: 花椒之味; Jyutping: faa1 ziu1 zi1 mei6) is a 2019 Hong Kong family drama film written and directed by Heiward Mak, adapted from Hong Kong chick lit writer Amy Cheung's novel ngo5 dik1 oi3 jyu4 ci2 maa4 laat6 (我的愛如此麻辣).The film is distributed by Media Asia Film and produced by Ann Hui and Julia Chu, starring Sammi Cheng, Megan Lai and Li Xiaofeng.

== Plot ==
After her father died, a Hong Kong girl discovers she has two hitherto unknown sisters, one in Taiwan and one in China. To settle her father's debt, she must reunite with them to run the family's hot pot restaurant. While the androgynous Taiwan sister is plagued by her toxic relationship with her mother, the fashionista sister from China is trying to fend off her grandmother's pressure to get married. Meanwhile, she is striving to unshackle herself from her ex-boyfriend in order to start a new relationship.

== Cast ==
- Sammi Cheng as Acacia, a travel agent
  - Leung Wing as young Acacia
- Megan Lai as Branch, a professional pool player
- Li Xiaofeng as Cherry, a fashion vlogger
- Richie Jen as Choi Ho-san, an anaesthetist
- Kenny Bee as Ha Leung, owner of a hot pot restaurant
- Andy Lau as Kwok Tin-yan, Acacia's ex-boyfriend
- Liu Juei-chi as Chang Ya-ling, Branch's mother
- Wu Yanshu as Liu Fang, Cherry's grandmother
- Siuyea Lo as Radish, a worker at the hot pot restaurant
- Bryant Mak as Sweet Potato, a worker at the hot pot restaurant
- Kaki Sham as real-estate agent
- Ben Yuen as Brother Yung, funeral parlor agent
- Yeung Yi-yi as dish-washing grandmother
- Tam Tin-bo as cashier
- Lo Pei-an as Branch's father
- Sunjet Wang as Branch's brother
- Judy Hsu as Branch's sister
- Pipi Yao as Branch's fan
- Joman Chiang as Acacia's mother

== Reception ==
Critical reception for the film was mostly positive, with critics and audience praising Mak's storytelling and the performance of the cast, especially Cheng's. Edmund Lee of South China Morning Post gives the film a 4.5 out of 5 stars, calling it "an astonishingly assured return to form for director Heiward Mak, and already a front-runner for next year’s Hong Kong Film Awards".

The Hollywood Reporter's Elizabeth Kerr commends writer-director Mak for her work, writing: "It would all be treacly, weepy nonsense were Mak not to maintain a light touch, and, especially, if the three leads weren’t so engaging." Commenting on the performances of cast, Scott Marks of the San Diego Reader writes that Fagara "is a film told from a feminist point-of-view by three smart, strong, and self-reliant actresses who bring plausibility to their characters."

Richard Yu of The Cinema Escapist calls it a "touching family drama", but suggests that "the story and characters would have received a more in-depth treatment in the form of a multi-part television series instead of a two hour movie". Similarly, Richard Gray writing for The Reel Bits awards the film 4 out of 5 stars, calling it an "excellent character-based drama that never falls into the trap of sentimentality."

== Awards and nominations ==
Award	Category	Recipients	Result	Ref(s)
26th Hong Kong Film Critics Society Award	Best Actress	Sammi Cheng	Nominated	
39th Hong Kong Film Awards	Best Film	Fagara	Nominated	
39th Hong Kong Film Awards	Best Director	Heiward Mak	Nominated	
39th Hong Kong Film Awards	Best Screenplay	Heiward Mak	Nominated	
39th Hong Kong Film Awards	Best Actress	Sammi Cheng	Nominated	
39th Hong Kong Film Awards	Best Supporting Actress	Megan Lai	Nominated	
39th Hong Kong Film Awards	Best Cinematography	S.K. Yip	Nominated	
39th Hong Kong Film Awards	Best Art Direction	Cheung Siu-hong	Won	
39th Hong Kong Film Awards	Best Costume Make Up Design	Cheung Siu-hong	Nominated	
39th Hong Kong Film Awards	Best Sound Design	Tu Duu-Chih, Chiang Yi Chen	Nominated	
39th Hong Kong Film Awards	Best Original Film Score	Yusuke Hatano	Nominated	
39th Hong Kong Film Awards	Best Original Film Song	"Say It" by Sammi Cheng	Nominated	
