= Chu Pak Hong =

Hong Kong actor (born 1982)

- 朱栢康
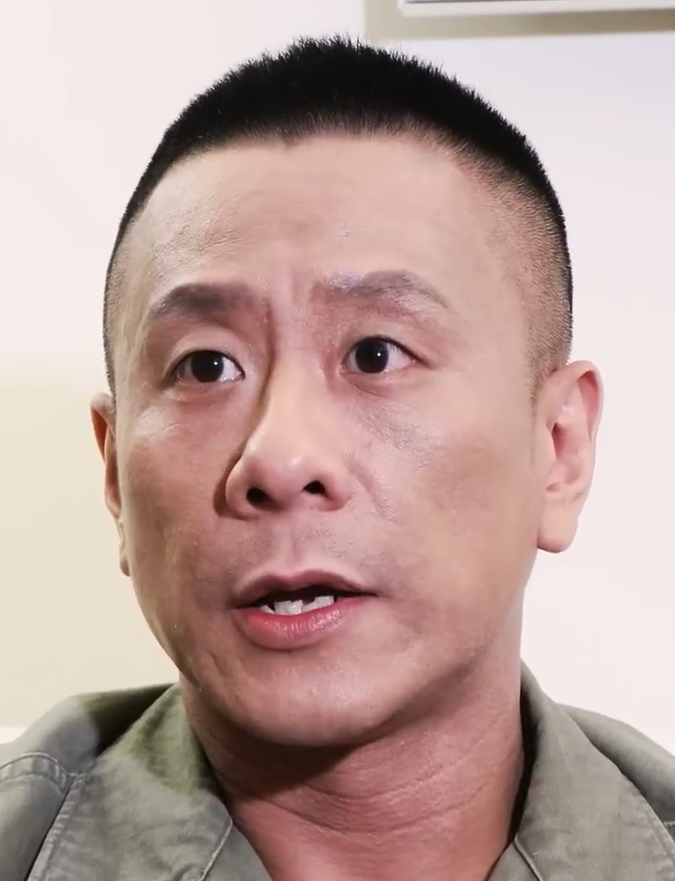
- Chu in November 2024
- Born: Chu Pak Hong; 4 November 1982 (age 43); Hong Kong
- Education: Hong Kong Academy for Performing Arts (BFA)
- Occupation: Actor
- Years active: 2017–present
- Family: Chu Pak Him (brother)

Tommy Chu Pak Hong (Chinese: 朱栢康; born 4 November 1982) is a Hong Kong actor. He rose to fame with his lead and titular role as Edward in the romance film My Prince Edward (2019), which earned him nominations for Best Leading Actor in the 56th Golden Horse Awards and Best Actor in the 39th Hong Kong Film Awards, and gained international recognition for starring in the Finnish romantic comedy film Master Cheng (2019) directed by Mika Kaurismäki. In 2025, Chu won Best Supporting Actor in the 43rd Hong Kong Film Awards with The Last Dance (2024).

== Early life and education ==
Chu was born on 4 November 1982 in Hong Kong. He grew up in Shatin and attended a Christian school, where he was influenced by his elder brother, Chu Pak Him, who joined the drama club and became enthusiastic about school performances. Following in his brother's footsteps, he also joined the drama club when he entered secondary school. Due to his grades not being sufficient for promotion to Form 6, Chu initially attended Hong Kong Institute of Vocational Education to study business administration. During that time, he participated in a drama competition and won a prize. Screenwriter Loong Man-Hong, the competition's adjudicator, encouraged him to study acting. Therefore, Chu transferred to Hong Kong Academy for Performing Arts in 2000 to study performing arts. While in university, Chu started working as a freelance actor in theatre companies. He graduated with a Bachelor of Fine Arts in 2005.

== Career ==
After graduating from the Hong Kong Academy for Performing Arts, Chu pursued a full-time career as a stage actor. In 2007, he formed a band called Juicyning with his brother Pak Him and APA classmates Michael Ning and Yeung Wai-lun. Chu faced limited job opportunities in the subsequent years, which led him to consider a career change, but his father encouraged him to continue acting.

Chu landed his first major television role in the 2017 miniseries Midnight Cousin, alongside his bandmates. The following year, he won Best Actor in the 28th Hong Kong Drama Awards with his performance in Stones in His Pockets. In 2019, he was invited by director Mika Kaurismäki to star in the lead and titular role of the Finnish romantic comedy film Master Cheng, marking his first prominent and first international onscreen role. In the same year, Chu was handpicked by director Norris Wong to co-lead the romance film My Prince Edward after Wong saw his performance in the music video of Alfred Hui's "An Actor Prepares". Chu portrayed Edward, the possessive, obnoxious, and immature long-time boyfriend of Stephy Tang's character. His performance received widespread acclaim, and earned him nominations for Best Leading Actor in the 56th Golden Horse Awards and Best Actor in the 39th Hong Kong Film Awards.

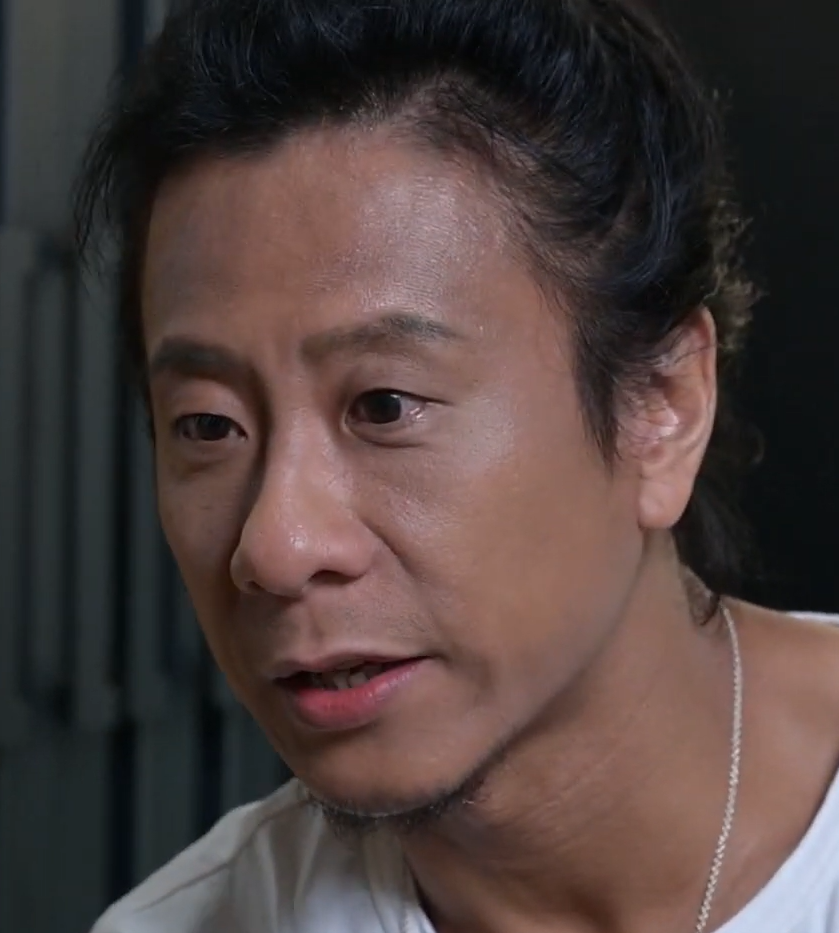
Chu interviewed by am730 in September 2022

In 2021, Chu secured lead roles as Grey Bear in the romance film Ready o/r Knot and Dai Shing in the drama film Drifting. He also appeared in the 2022 drama film The Narrow Road alongside his brother. In 2023, Chu landed the lead role in the horror film It Remains, and reprised his role in Ready or Rot, the sequel to Ready or K/not. He also played the main villain in the ViuTV drama series 940920, a sequel to the 2020 series Leap Day. Despite receiving praise for his performance, the character faced criticism for odd motives and sudden personality twist. In 2024, Chu took on the lead role of Wing Lo, a comedic lyric writing course tutor, in the drama film The Lyricist Wannabe. He also appeared in supporting roles in the drama film Fly Me to the Moon and the martial arts film Twilight of the Warriors: Walled In the same year. Chu played Ben, a Taoist priest who is forced to industry to uphold family traditions in the 2024 drama film The Last Dance, for which he won Best Supporting Actor in the 43rd Hong Kong Film Awards.

== Personal life ==
Chu is a Christian. He had married a Taiwanese woman but got divorced as the couple failed to maintain their long-distance relationship.

== Filmography ==
=== Film ===
Year	Title	Role	Notes/Ref.
2017	Zombiology: Enjoy Yourself Tonight	Brother Kim Jr.	
2019	Ciao UFO	Heem's brother	
2019	Master Cheng	Cheng	
2019	My Prince Edward	Edward Yan Chun-wing	
2021	Ready o/r Knot	Grey Bear (灰熊)	
2021	Drifting	Dai Shing (大勝)	
2022	Let It Ghost	Mall customer	Cameo
2022	The Narrow Road	Chak's friend	
2023	Tales from the Occult：Body and Soul	Steve Pun	
2023	It Remains	Tam Ka Ho (譚珈豪)	
2023	In Broad Daylight	Prosecutor	
2023	Ready or Rot	Grey Bear	
2024	The Lyricist Wannabe	Wing Lo (魯永康)	
2024	Fly Me to the Moon	Fai (阿輝)	
2024	Twilight of the Warriors: Walled In	Gau Sok (九索)	
2024	The Last Dance	Ben (郭志斌)	
2024	Last Song for You	Bing (細炳)	
2024	The Prosecutor	Cheng Ho-yin (鄭浩賢)	
2025	My Best Bet	Ian Suen (孫敏俊)	

=== Television ===
Year	Title	Role	Notes/Ref.
2017	Midnight Cousin	Dak Shing (德成)	Main role
2019	Dark City	Chow Yuk Ming (周郁明)	Main role
2020	Warriors Within	Lee Yat Dong (李一當)	Main role
2020	Iron Ladies	Shum Dai Hong (岑大康)	Recurring role
2021	Ink at Tai Ping	Chow Yu Si (周宇時)	Special appearance
2023	940920	Yuet (月)	Main role

== Awards and nominations ==
Year	Award	Category	Work	Result	Ref.
2019	28th Hong Kong Drama Awards	Best Actor	Stones in His Pockets	Won	
2019	56th Golden Horse Awards	Best Leading Actor	My Prince Edward	Nominated	
2020	39th Hong Kong Film Awards	Best Actor	My Prince Edward	Nominated	
2025	18th Asian Film Awards	Best Supporting Actor	The Last Dance	Nominated	
2025	43rd Hong Kong Film Awards	Best Supporting Actor	The Last Dance	Won	
