= Master Cheng =

2019 Finnish film

- Finnish: Mestari Cheng
- Directed by: Mika Kaurismäki
- Written by: Hannu Oravisto
- Produced by: Mika Kaurismäki
- Starring: Anna-Maija Tuokko; Chu Pak Hong; Kari Väänänen; Lucas Hsuan; Vesa-Matti Loiri
- Cinematography: Jari Mutikainen
- Edited by: Tuuli Kuittinen
- Music by: Anssi Tikanmäki; Eemil Tikanmäki; Eljas Tikanmäki
- Production companies: Marianna Films; By Media; Han Run Yuan He
- Release date: 27 September 2019
- Running time: 114 minutes
- Countries: Finland; China
- Languages: Finnish; Mandarin; English
- Budget: €2.9 million

Master Cheng (Finnish: Mestari Cheng) is a 2019 Finnish romantic drama comedy film directed by Mika Kaurismäki. The film stars Anna-Maija Tuokko, Chu Pak Hong, Kari Väänänen, Lucas Hsuan and Vesa-Matti Loiri, with dialogue in English, Finnish and Mandarin.

The story is about a Chinese master chef who comes to a small Finnish village, where his cooking causes an overhaul of local life and cures local people of various ailments. The story also touches on aspects of childlessness and of losing one's spouse.

The film premiered in Finland 27 September 2019 and in China in January 2020.

== Plot ==
After the death of his wife, the Chinese master chef Cheng travels from Shanghai to the village of Pohjanjoki in Finnish Lapland with his son Niu Niu to meet his benefactor Fongtron, who had helped him during a difficult period after his wife's death. When they arrive in Pohjanjoki by bus, they walk to a building consisting of a lunch cafe and a small supermarket and are welcomed by Sirkka, who runs the cafe. Cheng asks her and all the lunch guests if they know a man named Fongtron, but nobody does. Later in the film, it turns out that Fongtron's actual name was Pekka Forsström, a man who had died a year earlier.

Sirkka invites them to stay for lunch, consisting of a sausage stew, mashed potatoes and a mix of shredded carrots and shredded cabbage as side salad. Except for variations to how the sausage is prepared, this turns out to be the dish served most days, as Sirkka has very limited cooking skills and has no help in the kitchen. At the end of the day, as there are no hotels in Pohjanjoki, Sirkka finds them a room in a house nearby.

The next day, a bus full of Chinese tourists breaks down just outside the cafe, so Sirkka invites them for lunch. However, seeing what's on offer the tourists aren't interested. Cheng intervenes, telling Sirkka that he can give them what they want. He and Sirkka run into the supermarket and buy various ingredients, and he ends up serving the tourists Chinese noodle soup followed by a sorbet with fruit. They love the food and tell Sirkka that they will come back the next day, and the Chinese tourist guide tells her that he will recommend her cafe for other groups.

So Cheng starts planning more dishes and the local lunch guests must change their eating habits or go elsewhere, as the cafe doesn't have the resources to offer a variety of dishes. However, the locals also find Cheng's food tasty. He explains to them that Chinese food can create happiness and wellbeing, and they soon find that it cures them from many ailments, ranging from high blood pressure to menstrual pain. In return, the locals treat Cheng to Finnish experiences, such as fishing by the lake shore, Finnish sauna and tango dancing.

With Sirkka's help, Cheng's son Niu Niu soon gets over his homesickness for China and makes friends with the local children.

Gradually, Cheng and Sirkka fall in love. As Cheng has overstayed his tourist visa, they travel to China to marry so they then can return and run the cafe as a team and ensure continued happiness and wellbeing for the locals.

== Cast ==
- Chu Pak Hong as Cheng
- Anna-Maija Tuokko as Sirkka
- Lucas Hsuan as Niu Niu
- Kari Väänänen as Romppainen
- Vesa-Matti Loiri as Vilppula
- Paula Miettinen as Mervi

== Production ==
Most of the filming was done in the village of Raattama in northern Kittilä. The village has about 160 inhabitants and sits between the Ounasjoki river and the Pallas-Yllästunturi National Park.

Two-thirds of the film's budget of €2.9 million came from China. The film was shot for six weeks in summer 2018 in Raattama, Sodankylä, and in China.

The film premiered in Finland on 27 September 2019 and had its Chinese premiere in January 2020 during the Chinese New Year.

The film won the first prize in the public's choice awards at the Lübeck Nordic Film Days festival in autumn 2019 and received 93% of the votes, which was a new record during the festival's history.

The film was sold to many countries. It received its premiere in Germany on 30 July 2020 in 146 cinemas, gaining a huge public success. The film received its premiere in Austria on the same day. Next the film came to cinemas in Switzerland on 20 August 2020 and later in autumn in the United Kingdom and Japan.
