= List of 2024 box office number-one films in Hong Kong =

This is a list of films which placed number-one at the Weekly box office in Hong Kong during 2024.

== Number-one films ==
†	This implies the highest-grossing movie of the year.

#	Date	Film	Weekend gross	Total gross	Ref.
1	4 January 2024	The Goldfinger	HK$14.58 million (US$1.88 million)	HK$23.95 million (US$3.08 million)	
2	11 January 2024	The Goldfinger	HK$8.28 million (US$1.07 million)	HK$32.23 million (US$4.15 million)	
3	18 January 2024	The Goldfinger	$772,222	$4,895,056	
4	25 January 2024	The Goldfinger	$379,431	$5,275,909	
5	1 February 2024	Spy x Family Code: White	$640,028	$640,028	
6	8 February 2024	Table for Six 2	$1,712,519	$1,712,519	
7	15 February 2024	Table for Six 2	$2,137,162	$3,873,656	
8	22 February 2024	Rob N Roll	$611,355	$1,894,688	
9	29 February 2024	Dune: Part Two	$1,322,535	$1,322,535	
10	7 March 2024	Dune: Part Two	$1,280,546	$2,604,467	
11	14 March 2024	Dune: Part Two	$827,600	$3,426,082	
12	21 March 2024	Dune: Part Two	$498,407	$3,924,574	
13	28 March 2024	We 12	$1,397,714	$1,397,714	
14	4 April 2024	Godzilla x Kong: The New Empire	$1,199,816	$2,481,281	
15	11 April 2024	Haikyu!! The Dumpster Battle	$590,085	$649,570	
16	18 April 2024	Haikyu!! The Dumpster Battle	$395,382	$1,045,416	
17	25 April 2024	Mobile Suit Gundam SEED Freedom	$594,360	$594,360	
18	2 May 2024	The Fall Guy	$214,018	$828,974	
19	9 May 2024	Twilight of the Warriors: Walled In	$2,718,521	$5,349,196	
20	16 May 2024	Twilight of the Warriors: Walled In	$2,800,892	$8,158,028	
21	23 May 2024	Twilight of the Warriors: Walled In	$1,884,859	$10,032,058	
22	30 May 2024	Twilight of the Warriors: Walled In	$1,208,276	$11,231,417	
23	6 June 2024	Twilight of the Warriors: Walled In	$808,084	$12,048,371	
24	13 June 2024	Twilight of the Warriors: Walled In	$679,682	$12,731,153	
25	20 June 2024	Twilight of the Warriors: Walled In	$456,422	$13,194,962	
26	27 June 2024	Inside Out 2	$1,242,176	$1,242,176	
27	4 July 2024	Inside Out 2	$2,954,599	$4,195,917	
28	11 July 2024	Inside Out 2	$2,395,339	$6,604,791	
29	18 July 2024	Inside Out 2	$1,795,782	$8,387,396	
30	25 July 2024	Deadpool & Wolverine	$3,061,730	$3,061,730	
31	1 August 2024	Deadpool & Wolverine	$1,130,050	$4,861,919	
32	8 August 2024	Deadpool & Wolverine	$546,269	$5,724,900	
33	15 August 2024	Alien Romulus	$1,242,011	$1,242,011	
34	22 August 2024	Alien Romulus	$679,092	$2,374,775	
35	29 August 2024	Alien Romulus	$332,109	$2,972,914	
36	5 September 2024	Alien Romulus	$168,169	$3,199,405	
37	12 September 2024	Love Lies	$349,372	$349,372	
38	19 September 2024	Love Lies	$592,212	$1,011,324	
39	26 September 2024	Alien Romulus	$14,952	$3,434,801	
40	3 October 2024	The Wild Robot	$177,662	$177,662	
41	10 October 2024	Joker: Folie à Deux	$342,882	$1,334,606	
42	17 October 2024	The Substance	$224,525	$536,230	
43	24 October 2024	Venom: The Last Dance	$925,573	$925,573	
44	31 October 2024	Cesium Fallout	$1,193,494	$1,193,494	
45	7 November 2024	The Last Dance	$1,974,020	$1,974,020	
46	14 November 2024	The Last Dance	$5,374,197	$7,453,948	
47	21 November 2024	The Last Dance	$3,967,237	$11,047,152	
48	28 November 2024	The Last Dance	$2,557,018	$13,607,647	
49	5 December 2024	The Last Dance	$1,645,478	$15,258,352	
50	12 December 2024	The Last Dance	$1,114,647	$16,379,867	
51	19 December 2024	The Last Dance	$811,283	$17,190,212	
52	26 December 2024	The Prosecutor	$1,142,941	$1,564,772	

== Highest-grossing films ==
International film

Hong Kong film

Highest-grossing films of 2024 (In-year releases)
Rank	Title	Distributor	Domestic gross
1	The Last Dance	Emperor Motion Pictures / Intercontinental Film Distributors	HK$157,577,964
2	Twilight of the Warriors: Walled In	Media Asia Films / Intercontinental Film Distributors	HK$108,448,257
3	Inside Out 2	Walt Disney Pictures	HK$84,526,606
4	Deadpool & Wolverine	Walt Disney Pictures	HK$48,053,147
5	Cesium Fallout	Edko Films	HK$41,050,625
6	Table for Six 2	Edko Films	HK$37,359,450
7	Dune: Part Two	Universal Pictures (Hong Kong)	HK$35,985,002
8	Despicable Me 4	Universal Pictures (Hong Kong)	HK$35,525,502
9	The Moon Thieves	Emperor Motion Pictures	HK$27,547,277
10	The Prosecutor	Mandarin Motion Pictures	HK$26,905,359

== See also ==
- 2024 in Hong Kong
- List of Hong Kong films of 2024
- List of 2023 box office number-one films in Hong Kong

Preceded by 2023 Box office number-one films	Box office number-one films 2024	Succeeded by 2025 Box office number-one films
