= Heiward Mak =

Hong Kong director

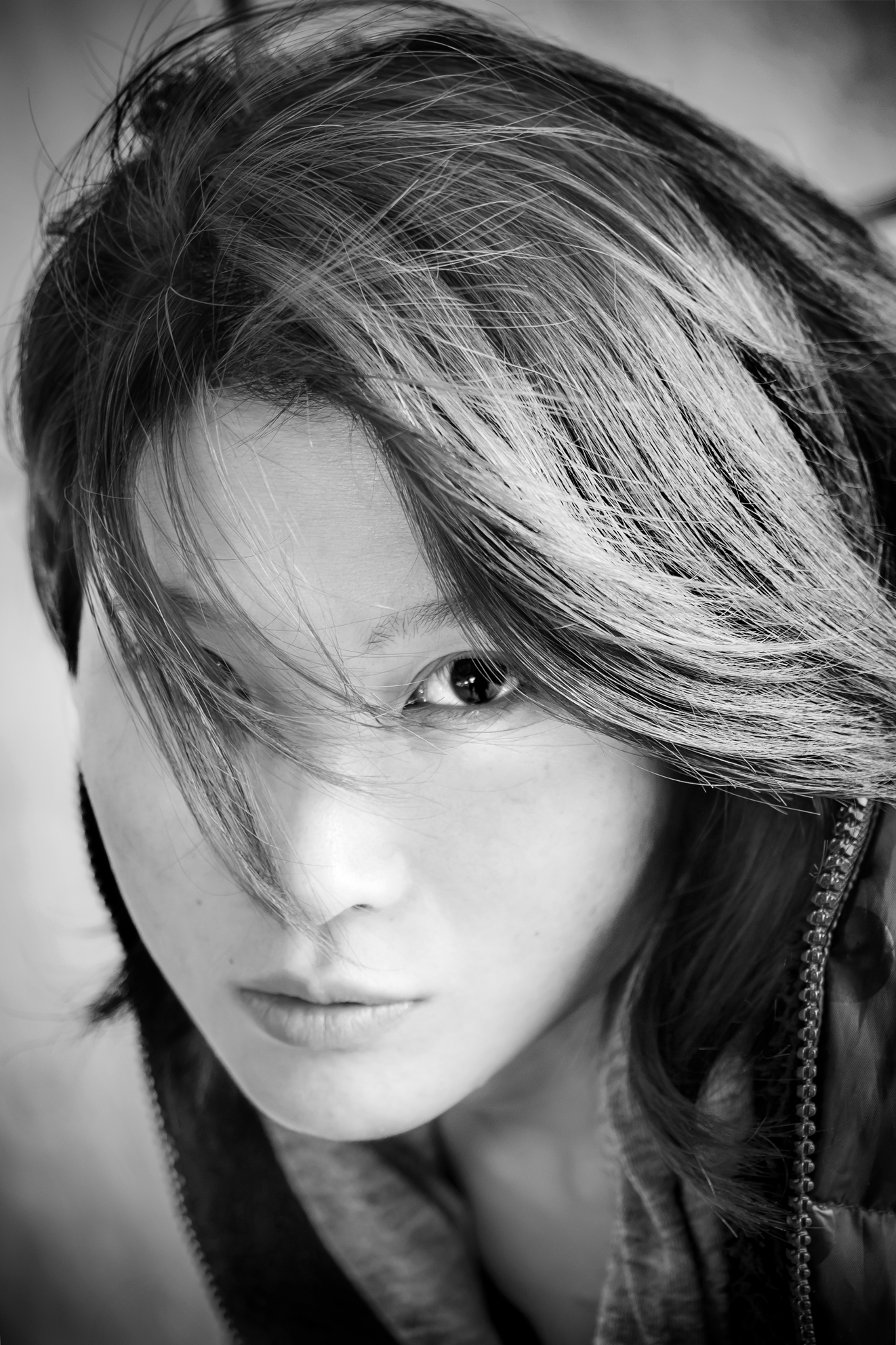
- Mak in 2014
- Born: August 21, 1984 (age 42); Tai Wai, Hong Kong
- Occupations: Director; writer; producer

Heiward Mak Hei-yan (Chinese: 麥曦茵; Jyutping: mak6 hei1 jan1) is a Hong Kong film director, writer and producer. Her work has been featured at various international film festivals including Singapore, Bratislava and Fribourg. In 2011, she won a Hong Kong Film Award for Best Screenplay for her writing on Love in a Puff.

== Biography ==
Mak was born in 1984 and grew up in Tai Wai, Hong Kong where she attend Sha Tin Government Secondary School. She received a diploma in graphic design at Hong Kong Polytechnic University in 2003. After graduation, she worked as a graphic artist before enrolling at City University of Hong Kong within the school of Creative Media. Her thesis film Lovers’ Lover won a Gold Award at the IFVA in their Open Category section. Her teacher Patrick Tam later showed Lovers’ Lover to actor Eric Tsang. This landed Mak a casting job on the comedy film Men Suddenly in Black 2, which Tsang acted in and co-produced. Mak had written a few lines of dialogue for the casting process as the screenplay had not been written that early into production. After Tsang read what Mak had written, he offered her a co-writer position.

She graduated with a BA in Creative Media in 2006.

In 2008, Mak made her directorial debut when producer Eric Tsang gave her the opportunity to film a remake of Winds of September which later became High Noon. For her work she was nominated for a Hong Kong Film Award for Best New Director and given a Film of Merit by the Hong Kong Film Critics Society.

After directing the film Ex, she worked alongside to Pang Ho-cheung to make romantic comedy Love in a Puff which went on to earn her a Hong Kong Film Award for Best Screenplay.

== Filmography ==
Year	Film	Director	Writer	Notes
2006	Men Suddenly in Black 2	No	Yes	Co-writer
2008	High Noon	Yes	Yes	
2010	Ex	Yes	Yes	
2010	Love in a Puff	No	Yes	Co-writer
2011	I Love Hong Kong	No	Yes	Co-writer
2012	Diva	Yes	Yes	
2014	Uncertain Relationships Society	Yes	Yes	
2018	Golden Job	No	Yes	Co-writer
2019	Fagara	Yes	Yes	Co-writer

== See also ==
- Wong Chun—Hong Kong director and fellow City University alumni who got his start in the industry working with Eric Tsang
- Jun Li (director)—Hong Kong director; Mak was the editor for his film Drifting
