= Pomato (company) =

Online video production team based in Hong Kong

Pomato Studio Limited
- Pomato 小薯茄 logo
- Native name: 小薯茄工作室有限公司
- Company type: Private company
- Industry: Film production
- Founded: September 2016; 9 years ago
- Headquarters: 29–35 Sha Tsui Road; Tsuen Wan, New Territories; Hong Kong
- Products: Internet video
- Website: https://www.pomato.hk/

Pomato 小薯茄

YouTube information
- Channels: Pomato 小薯茄; 小薯茄日常 Pomato Daily
- Years active: 2016–present
- Subscribers: 529 thousand (Pomato 小薯茄); 138 thousand (小薯茄日常 Pomato Daily)
- Views: 185 million (Pomato 小薯茄); 17.4 million (小薯茄日常 Pomato Daily)
- Last updated: 20 May 2023

Pomato
- Chinese: 小薯茄
Transcriptions
Standard Mandarin
- Hanyu Pinyin: Xiǎo shǔ qié
Yue: Cantonese
- Jyutping: Siu^{2} syu^{4} ke^{4}

Pomato Studio Limited (Chinese: 小薯茄工作室有限公司) is a Hong Kong video production company that creates online comedic skits.

Pomato was established by students of Hong Kong Baptist University's film school who thought they collaborated well in their school projects and wanted to continue making skits. The group makes videos that appeal to Hongkongers' sense of humour and that focus on the topics of friendship, romantic relationships, and life in Hong Kong. They started their Facebook page in September 2016 and also upload YouTube videos. Their appeal led to their receiving numerous requests for producing advertisement skits including from businesses like Subway, government entities like the Hong Kong Police Force and the Consumer Council, and people like the singer-songwriter Deep Ng and the singer Wilfred Lau.

== History ==
Pomato's members are people born in the 1990s who largely attended Hong Kong Baptist University's film school. Pomato was borne from Ko Kong Lin, Kenneth, Kwan Ho Kit, and Kiko's film school project. After collaborating, the group thought they worked well together and decided to continue making films together on various topics. They participated in competitions and used the prize money to purchase filming equipment. In September 2016, Pomato created its Facebook page. To serve as their workspace, they rented a unit in factory. Initially, Pomato had eight members, which grew to 13 people by 2018. The group's headquarters is on Sha Tsui Road in Tsuen Wan District in New Territories.

The group makes skits about Hong Kong people's lives with the videos having lengths of between several tens of seconds and two minutes. The skits are primarily about romantic relationships, friendships, and life in general. They attempt to produce comedic content that appeals to Hongkongers' sense of humour. Ko and Kenneth are the primary writers for the skits' scripts. As inspiration for their content, they pay close attention to the latest popular online discussions so that they can understand how Hong Kong people live. According to U Lifestyle, Pomato's skits are "funny and easily resonate" with viewers. In August 2019, Pomato had 130,000 Facebook followers, which has allowed its members to be recruited for outside job options.

There are a small number of characters in Pomato's skits. The Hong Kong Economic Times said the characters are very relatable to Hong Kong netizens who love watching them. Influenced by the popularity of seven-second funny videos from foreign countries, Pomato initially tried producing similar content. Their short videos received a tepid response from Hongkongers who had to imagine what happened at the end of the video to understand why the video was funny. Pomato director Ko Kong Lin found that Hongkongers preferred clear and direct humour. Ko concluded that Hongkongers enjoyed watching skits that shared some more information, was filled with dialogue, and had many laugh out loud moments. Pomato found inspiration in comedy films, which they analysed to determine what made the films funny and then created their own comedy content. Pomato actor Rik Ching said many Pomato skits have hints of Virtues of Harmony, which is marked by much dialogue, a fast cadence, and filled with laughter. Pomato's subsequent content has a heavy focus on how couples interact with each other. They distinguish their content by showcasing heartfelt words that people usually would not say to each other. In a demonstration of how the skits resonate with couples, after watching the skits, many boyfriends or girlfriends would comment and tag their counterpart. Pomato makes skits that discuss daily life such as one about the five-second rule that accumulated 660,000 views on Facebook.

In support of the protests against the 2019 Hong Kong extradition bill, Pomato backed a joint statement from 44 members of the YouTube community that proclaimed "Hong Kong is seriously ill" and joined a strike on 5 August 2019. Pomato participated in YouTube's "#StayHome #WithMe" campaign done in collaboration with Hong Kong Performing Artistes Guild that encouraged people to isolate at home during the COVID-19 pandemic. On 25 April 2020, local Hong Kong content creators including Pomato performed live for the campaign. On 11 October 2020, Pomato performed live during the virtual YouTube FanFest in a segment that showcased Asia-Pacific creators. On 20 April 2021, Pomato collaborated on YouTube with three other major Hong Kong YouTube video production teams, Trial & Error, Arm Channel and FHProductionHK, to hold a live four-hour broadcast of discussions and films they produced. One of the initiators of the event, Neo Yau, considered it as a new generation of Hong Kong entertainment industry.

== Members ==
=== Actors ===
- Rik Ching (Chinese: 程仁富; born 25 June 1991), known as 程人富 (Ching Yan Fu), received a bachelor's degree from City University of Hong Kong's School of Creative Media and a higher diploma from Hong Kong Baptist University's film school. In his third year of university in 2016, a classmate invited him to perform in a comedy skit for Pomato that was posted online. The director of the ViuTV TV series Limited Education noticed the film and saw his resemblance to a character in the planned series and invited him to audition to the role, which he subsequently was selected for.
- Sabrina Ng (Chinese: 吳冰), known as 阿冰 (Ah Ping), was a film student during university and dreamed of becoming an actress. She struggled to get involved in the industry. During a freelance opportunity, she saw a Pomato staff member she recognised, after which she joined Pomato as an actress. She acted as the leading female role in the band Dear Jane's "Galactic Repairman" music video. During the song's promotion, Dear Jane had frequent interactions with Pomato.
- Amy Tang Lai Ying (Chinese: 鄧麗英; born 4 April 1997) entered the entertainment industry when after graduating from high school, her drama teacher recommended that she try movie casting. She attended the Hong Kong Baptist University and said in August 2018 that she had two years remaining to receive a creative writing degree. Pomato invited her to join the group to make videos. Her mother was a huge fan of the singer Teresa Teng, so her maternal grandfather selected her name to be similar in sound to the actress' name.
- Christy Choi Hiu Tung (Chinese: 蔡曉童), known as 童童 (Tung Tung), began acting at school in sixth grade and joined Pomato in 2017. She has the youthful face of a girl but frequently portrays a fierce girlfriend in Pomato skits.
- Jeffrey Kwan (Chinese: 關浩傑), known as 阿J (Ah J).

=== Behind the scenes members ===
- Ko Kong Lin (Chinese: 高江凌) is the director.
- Kenneth is a screenwriter.
- Kiko (Chinese: 陳健欣) does postproduction.
- Ho Si Cai (Chinese: 何師齊) is the camera operator.

== Sponsored videos ==
Pomato's "fresh, positive image and filming style" has led to numerous government agencies, businesses, and celebrities to approach them to make sponsored videos. In the last six months of 2017, Pomato received requests to make 20 advertisements, each of which they charged roughly HK$20,000 to HK$30,000 (US$2,574 to US$3,861) to make. Pomato has created ads for Deep Ng, Wilfred Lau, the Consumer Council, and the Hong Kong Police Force. With everyday products, Pomato focuses on how people use the products in their day-to-day lives to build common ground among Hong Kong viewers. They exaggerate how the product is used to induce laughs and to make people be fine with being shown an advertisement.

For example, Pomato published an ad skit titled "When ordering a meal in Subway" that depicted how owing to weak English language skills, when buying food at Subway, Hong Kong people are reduced to saying "This, this, this". Despite the video's clearly being an ad, the skit's humorous depiction of daily life caused audience members to give it "likes". The audience acquiesced to it, which allowed the video to do a "hard sell" of Subway at the end. In an ad produced for the Consumer Council and the Financial Services and the Treasury Bureau, Pomato taught consumers how to turn away people who make calls offering debt restructuring services. One method was for the person to tell the caller, "I want to buy an $80 million house. I want to be an owner." When the caller asks how much money the person makes a month, respond "$2000", which will make the caller immediately leave. The second method was to counter-sell to the caller in telling them that their voice sounds hoarse and to offer a reasonably priced physical examination plan. The third method was to be a "master of reasoning" who sees through the scam and tells the caller that if they were a real bank employee, they would disclose their full name and employee number. In another sponsored video, they made a one-minute skit broadcast on Chungking Mansions' outer wall warning about a love scam where a woman played by the actress Mimi Chu is defrauded of her money.

== Skits ==
The Pomato skit titled "Women's level of makeup depends on their counterpart? One glance will reveal who most likes you" received numerous views. It said women have different levels of putting on makeup. The first level of putting on basic makeup is for typical activities of going out and going to work. The second level of putting on eye liner and rouge is for someone she is more interested in. The third level of full makeup including putting on eyelash extensions and eye shadow is for a man she is deeply infatuated with because she wants to be his centre of attention. The fourth level of putting on no makeup is for showing a woman's true self to her boyfriend in which she no longer wears a "disguise". She loves the man so much that she will relinquish the opportunity to encourage other men to be attracted to her.

Pomato created a skit in 2019 discussing a boyfriend's not understanding safety pants (leggings) versus underwear and sports bra versus bra. It depicted a guy, upon seeing the length of his girlfriend's skirt, objecting to her wearing it and going out. She reassured him that she was wearing safety pants underneath but he countered that male voyeurs who wanted to see underneath her skirt would already have taken advantage of her even if she were wearing safety pants. The skit's release sparked impassioned debates among netizens with many saying it showcased male chauvinism. Stressing the importance of bodily integrity, they argued that women should be able to wear whatever they liked. Another set of netizens agreed with the male character in the skit, saying that "safety pants are not safe" and "Obscene males don't care if it's safety pants or underwear". SET News said the actors had "hilarious acting skills" and the skit sparked substantial discussion about respect and the relationship between men and women.

Pomato published a skit in 2018 titled "Don't call the wrong girlfriend's name" in which a boyfriend who is playing on his cell phone uses the wrong name, Kiki, to address his girlfriend Tungtung when he asks her for water. As his girlfriend becomes angry, he successfully soothes her by saying, "Other guys call their girlfriend 'piggy" or 'BB' (baby). If I call you that today, am I calling another person's girlfriend?" His phone rings with Kiki's name on the caller ID, after which Tungtung becomes angry and immediately kills him.
