= The Moon Thieves =

2024 Hong Kong film by Steve Yuen

- Theatrical release poster
- Traditional Chinese: 盜月者
- Jyutping: Dou^{6} Jyut^{6} Ze^{2}
- Directed by: Steve Yuen
- Screenplay by: Ronald Chan
- Produced by: Jason Siu; Ray Pang
- Starring: Anson Lo; Edan Lui; Louis Cheung; Michael Ning; Keung To
- Cinematography: Karl Tam
- Edited by: Wong Hoi
- Music by: Yusuke Hatano
- Production companies: Emperor Motion Pictures; MakerVille
- Distributed by: Emperor Motion Pictures
- Release date: 9 February 2024 (Hong Kong)
- Running time: 108 minutes
- Country: Hong Kong
- Language: Cantonese

The Moon Thieves (Chinese: 盜月者) is a 2024 Hong Kong heist film directed by Steve Yuen. Starring Anson Lo, Edan Lui, Louis Cheung, Michael Ning and Keung To, the film is loosely based on the 2009 Ginza Tenshodo heist and the 2010 Hong Kong post office robbery. It revolves around a heist mission in Japan,featuring two inexperienced recruits, a counterfeiter (Lui) and a locksmith (Lo), who join a reluctant crew (Cheung and Ning).

Principal photography took place from March to May 2023, with locations in Tokyo and Hong Kong. The film was theatrically released in Hong Kong on 9 February 2024 as a Chinese New Year film of the Year of Dragon. It became the fifth highest-grossing Hong Kong film of 2024 and received a nomination for Best Visual Effects in the 43rd Hong Kong Film Awards.

== Plot ==
Vincent sells a frankenwatch – an antique watch composed of vintage parts sourced from different watches – to a customer at his father's watch shop. Uncle, the son of an influential underworld watch dealer, recognizes Vincent's talent and wants to recruit him as the watchmaker for a heist crew. Initially refusing, Vincent succumbs to Uncle's threats of exposing his deception to his father's customers. Uncle introduces Vincent to the leader of the crew, Chief, and orders Chief to gather Mario and Ms. Hong for a heist targeting three prestigious Picasso watches in Japan. Mario reluctantly agrees, while Ms. Hong declines in rage. But Yoh, Ms. Hong's son, volunteers to join the crew to earn money for his mother's cataract surgery.

The crew locates the Picasso watches at a renowned watch store in Tokyo. The crew gain access to the VIP room with Vincent and Yoh posing as wealthy customers who intend to buy an expensive watch from Chief and Mario at the target store. However, Vincent becomes distracted by the legendary Moonwatch inside the vault and fails to act according to the plan. Mario warns Vincent to take only the three watches they need. The crew carry out the heist during a fireworks show and successfully enter the VIP room. Yoh initially struggles to unlock the vault, but Vincent notices dried wax on the buttons, enabling Yoh to open it. Meanwhile, a drunk pedestrian triggers the alarm of the store's entrance, forcing the crew to retreat. Mario succumbs to greed and steals the Moonwatch during their escape. However, Mario realizes the trouble he's in with after learning about the backstory of the Moonwatch from Vincent later at the safe house. He exposes the crew's association with Uncle to the underground watch dealing market with Vincent's phone. Meanwhile, Chairman Kato, the crime lord who owns Moonwatch, orders his men to retrieve it. Chief confronts Mario about the additional watch requested by the Japanese hitmen. Mario shows Chief the stolen Moonwatch and proposes revolting against Uncle as he believes Uncle is trying to eliminate his father's longtime companions. The crew thus plans to expose Uncle and ensure their safety.

Yoh pretends to betray the crew and reveals their hideout to Uncle. Uncle's men capture the crew and bring them back to Hong Kong. Before Uncle orders Yoh to kill the others, Vincent intervenes and claims he is the only one who knows the location of the hidden Picasso watches. Uncle sends Vincent and Yoh to retrieve them. The duo goes to the post office to recover the watch parts that were mailed back to Hong Kong but encounter complications. Vincent and Yoh then decide to confront Uncle after setting up a trap door in the truck. Vincent threatens to destroy the watches unless Uncle releases Chief and Mario. Uncle reluctantly agrees and orders their release. However, as Yoh tosses the watches out of the truck to Uncle, a group of Japanese hitmen arrives on the scene. The arrogant Uncle orders his men to fire at the Japanese, but his men are swiftly gunned down. The hitmen take the Moonwatch while Uncle only secures the Picasso watches. The hitmen shoot at the truck, but the crew has already escaped through a trap door into underground pipes. They seek refuge at Tung's house, where Vincent discovers the missing parcel has been mailed back to Japan according to the return address.

In the mid-credits scene, Vincent reveals that the three Picasso watches given to Uncle were actually frankenwatches, and he proudly displays the real watches to his crewmates. Meanwhile, Uncle, unaware of the deception, attempts to sell the frankenwatches to a Russian crime lord who quickly discovers that the watches are fake. Uncle's henchman immediately abandons him, leaving a horrified Uncle at the Russians' gunpoint.

== Cast ==
- Anson Lo as Yoh: the younger son of Ms. Hong who volunteers to be the heist crew's lock-picking artist.
- Edan Lui as Vincent Ma: an antique watches counterfeiter who is recruited by Uncle to replace a deceased heist crew member.
- Louis Cheung as Chief: the leader of the heist crew who is loyal to Uncle's father.
- Michael Ning as Mario: an explosives specialist and a long-time member of the heist crew.
- Kwok Fung as Mr. Bard: an acquaintance of Uncle's father who orders the three Picasso watches.
- Ben Yuen as Kuen: a watch shop owner and the father of Vincent.
- Deon Cheung as Wayne: a crime lord who bought a frankenwatch from Vincent.
- Luna Shaw as Ms. Hong: a former accomplice of Chief and Mario who lost her eldest son in the previous operation.
- Ray So as Tung: a mentally-challenged worker at the post office who collects watch parts for Vincent.
- Keung To as Uncle: an arrogant and unhinged son of a deceased underworld watch dealer who tries to kill off his father's long-time subordinates.

Also appearing in the film are Kazuya Tanabe as Chairman Kato, a Japanese businessman and crime lord who secretly owns the Moonwatch; Ronald Lam as Arkin, a former accomplice of Chief and Mario and the watchmaker of the crew; Polly Lau and Elly Lam as news anchorwomen.

== Production ==
=== Development ===
The Moon Thieves was announced during the film presentation of Emperor Motion Pictures in March 2023, with Steve Yuen set to direct and boy group Mirror members Edan Lui, Anson Lo and Keung To cast in lead roles. The story is loosely based on the 2009 heist at Tenshodo in Ginza and the 2010 post office robbery in Hong Kong. In April 2023, production began with Louis Cheung and Michael Ning added to the cast. An official trailer was released in October 2023.

=== Filming ===
Principal photography began in March 2023 in Tokyo, Japan, and wrapped up in two weeks. Filming resumed on 27 April in Hong Kong, and wrapped on 1 May. Filming locations include a tailor shop in Prince Edward, a post office in Yau Tong and Chun Wang Street in Tseung Kwan O.

== Release ==
The Moon Thieves was theatrically released in Hong Kong on 9 February 2024 as a Chinese New Year film of the Year of Dragon. It was also selected to be the opening film of the 19th Osaka Asian Film Festival, and is available for streaming on Disney+ starting from 16 August 2024. The film was also screened in the Órbita section of the 57th Sitges Film Festival.

== Reception ==
=== Box office ===
The Moon Thieves grossed over HK$10 million on the fifth day after its theatrical release, and accumulated approximately HK$20 million during its second week. As of 2 March 2024, the film has grossed over HK$25 million, and it concluded its theatrical run with a total gross of over HK$27.5 million, making it the fifth highest-grossing Hong Kong film of 2024.

=== Critical response ===
Leslie Felperin of The Guardian gave the film 3/5 stars and described it as "very silly yet fiendishly watchable", acknowledging the incorporation of elements from Steven Soderbergh's Ocean's Eleven (2001) and entertaining plot mechanics that explores the workings of locks and watches, but pointed out its pre-packaged feel and the miscasting of Keung To, resulting in a film that is oddly enjoyable despite its absurdity. Edmund Lee of South China Morning Post gave the film 3.5/5 stars, praising its playful storytelling, slick visuals, and charismatic performances delivered by the majority of the cast, but criticized the miscasting of Keung To as the main villain. Lee also ranked the film ninth out of the 36 Hong Kong films theatrically released in 2024. Tara Brady of The Irish Times gave the film 3/5 stars and described the film as entertaining, falling somewhere between Hong Kong 1990s action flicks and Soderbergh's Oceans films, and praised the fun elements of lock-picking and watch mechanics, but criticizing the miscasting of Keung To and the occasional out-of-place performances by the ensemble.

Conversely, Thomas Kong of Esquire provided a contrasting opinion, focusing on the surprisingly impressive performances by the Mirror members, namely Edan Lui's clever and natural portrayal and Anson Lo's ability to evoke sympathy, as well as the challenging and standout role played by first-time villain actor Keung To. Ho Siu-bun of am730, who focused on the plotline, described the film as moderately entertaining, as it incorporated familiar elements of Hong Kong crime movies and explores an unfamiliar theme of watches as the target of the heist, but criticized its inconsistent storytelling and lack of character development.

== Awards and nominations ==
Year	Award	Category	Nominee	Result	Ref.
2025	43rd Hong Kong Film Awards	Best Visual Effects	Ng Ka-lung, Yeung Hey-chiu, Wave Cheung	Nominated	
