= The Prosecutor =

2024 Hong Kong film by Donnie Yen

- Theatrical release poster
- Traditional Chinese: 誤判
- Simplified Chinese: 误判
- Literal meaning: Miscarriage of justice
- Hanyu Pinyin: Wùpàn
- Jyutping: Ng^{6} Pun^{3}
- Directed by: Donnie Yen
- Written by: Edmond Wong
- Produced by: Donnie Yen; Raymond Wong
- Starring: Donnie Yen; Julian Cheung; Michael Hui; Francis Ng; MC Cheung Tin-fu
- Cinematography: Noah Wong
- Edited by: Li Ka-wing
- Music by: Chui Chit-ho
- Production companies: Mandarin Motion Pictures; Maoyan Entertainment; Huace Pictures
- Distributed by: Mandarin Motion Pictures
- Release dates: 21 December 2024 (Hong Kong); 27 December 2024 (China)
- Running time: 118 minutes
- Countries: Hong Kong; China
- Language: Cantonese
- Budget: HK$300 million (~US$38.5 million)
- Box office: US$128.1 million

The Prosecutor (Chinese: 誤判) is a 2024 action thriller film directed and co-produced by Donnie Yen, who also stars in the film alongside an ensemble cast that includes Julian Cheung, Michael Hui, Francis Ng, and MC Cheung Tin-fu. Loosely based on a real-life 2016 drug-trafficking case, the story follows a police detective-turned-public prosecutor (Yen) who seeks to overturn the conviction of a misjudged defendant (Mason Fung) entangled with a crime syndicate led by a law-educated drug lord (Julian Cheung).

Driven by the Supreme People's Procuratorate and co-produced by Hong Kong's Mandarin Motion Pictures and China's Shanghai Huace Film, the project was initially conceived as a legal drama film. The screenplay began development by Edmond Wong during the COVID-19 pandemic. In 2023, co-producer Raymond Wong approached Donnie Yen for the lead role, leading to a reimagining of the film as a hybrid of action and legal thriller. Pre-production started in May 2023, with principal photography taking place from October 2023 to February 2024 in Hong Kong. Japanese action choreographer Takahito Ouchi acted as the film's action director.

The film was theatrically released in Hong Kong and China on 21 and 27 December 2024, respectively. It secured three nominations in the 43rd Hong Kong Film Awards and received generally positive reviews from critics, who praised the action, innovative genre blend, and performances of the cast, particularly Donnie Yen and Michael Hui, but the screenplay and the lack of exploration of themes regarding justice in Hong Kong were subject to criticism. The box office performance was also considered satisfactory and the film became the fifth-highest-grossing Hong Kong film of 2024.

== Plot ==
Police detective Fok Chi-ho leads his team in the pursuit of an armed robbery gang. Although they capture all of the surviving gang members, the leader leaves no trace linking him to the crime and is released without conviction. This incident causes Fok to lose faith in policing, prompting him to leave the force and study law.

Seven years later, Fok joins the Department of Justice and becomes a public prosecutor. Under the mentorship of pupil master Bao, he receives his first case involving drug smuggling. The defendant, Ma, receives a parcel from Brazil containing a kilogram of cocaine. Ma insists he is innocent, claiming he has only lent his address to a friend, Chan, who promises him money to alleviate his family's debts. However, Ma's defense lawyer, Li, and legal executive, Au, mislead him into believing he is likely to be convicted, urging him to plead guilty for a reduced sentence, which Ma and his grandfather, Uncle Ma, agree to. When Li approaches Fok to discuss the plea bargain, Fok finds it suspicious that the terms require Ma to take full responsibility while Chan is completely absolved. Nevertheless, chief prosecutor Yeung accepts the terms, believing they provide the best chance for a conviction. During detention, Ma learns from fellow inmates that Li has deceived him, causing him to reconsider his guilty plea out of fear of not seeing his grandfather again. Fok, who believes in Ma's innocence, allows him to change his plea, which dissatisfies Yeung. In the first trial, Au and Li serve as prosecution witnesses. Despite Ma's lawyer attempting to prove that they have misled him during negotiations, his claims lack evidence and are easily dismissed. Fok begins to defend Ma and question his own witnesses. The judge attempts to stop Fok, leading to a clash where Fok argues that the prosecution should focus on those who are truly guilty rather than simply securing a conviction. This argument damages Ma's reputation with the jury, resulting in Chan being acquitted while Ma is convicted of drug smuggling and sentenced to 27 years for showing no remorse.

Realizing his mistake, Fok seeks to help Uncle Ma, who initially rejects him until Fok saves him during an assassination attempt. Uncle Ma reveals to Fok that they hired Li based on a recommendation from Lau, the owner of the restaurant where Ma works. After learning about the assassination attempt, Bao agrees to help Fok investigate, leading them to discover that Yeung has been the prosecutor in every case involving Au. Bao infiltrates a nightclub owned by Lau and overhears a conversation revealing that Lau and Chan are half-brothers. They learn that one brother solicits people to lend their addresses for drug smuggling, while the other pretends to offer pro bono legal assistance through Li and Au, who actually have them take the blame. Fok assists Uncle Ma in applying for an appeal, but Ma's uncle is later assassinated in a tea restaurant cha chaan teng. With the half-brothers as the only lead, Fok approaches other victims and eventually locates a girl willing to testify against Lau. Knowing Lau is exposed, Au attempts to persuade him to turn himself in and take full responsibility. However, he is murdered by Sang and Tung, Au's drug lord associates. Meanwhile, Fok confronts Yeung, discovering Yeung's innocence, and the two sets their differences aside.

During the retrial, Yeung acts as the prosecutor and buys time for Fok, who seeks to locate the hiding Chan. With the help of Inspector Lee, Fok's former protégé, they find and convince Chan to testify. However, they are attacked on their way to court, resulting in Lee being severely injured. Fok and Chan continue to the courthouse by MTR, encountering Sang's assassins during the ride. Fok dispatches them all and manages to reach the courthouse, where Chan delivers his testimony against Au. Ultimately, Ma is acquitted, while Au and his syndicate receive appropriate sentences.

== Cast ==
- Donnie Yen as Fok Chi-ho, a police senior inspector-turned-public prosecutor
- Julian Cheung as Au Pak-man, a law-educated drug lord who runs a barrister's chamber
- Michael Hui as George Hui, a high court judge who presides over the drug smuggling case
- Francis Ng as Yeung Dit-lap, the chief prosecutor of the Department of Justice
- MC Cheung Tin-fu as Lee King-wai, a police inspector and Fok's former subordinate
- Kent Cheng as Bao Ding, the pupil master of the Department of Justice
- Lau Kong as Uncle Ma, Ma Ka-kit's grandfather
- Yu Kang as Kim Hung, Sang's lead assassin
- Adam Pak as Lau Siu-keung, a restaurateur and Au's right-hand man in his drug-trafficking syndicate
- Locker Lam as Chan Kwok-wing, a drug dealer and the second defendant in the drug smuggling case
- Shirley Chan as Li Sze-man, a rising young barrister and the wife and accomplice of Au Pak-man
- Mason Fung as Ma Ka-kit, a young man from a low-income family wronged as the first defendant in the drug smuggling case
- Chu Pak Hong as Cheng Ho-yin, Ma Ka-kit's defense lawyer

In addition, cast members credited as special appearances include Ray Lui as Sang, a Cambodian drug lord who has been arrested by Fok years ago; Mark Cheng as Tung, Sang's rival drug lord who also receives supplies from Au; Sisley Choi as Leung May-yee, Fok's former detective partner; Justin Cheung as Cheung Man-bing, an armed robber arrested by Fok but released without conviction; and Mandy Wong as Cheung Man-bing's defense lawyer. Also appearing in the film are Max Cheung and Leung Chung-hang as Fok's fellow prosecutors; and Philip Chan as a judge. Liza Wang cameos as the Secretary for Justice, while Klyster Yen, Donnie Yen's father, cameos as Fok Chi-ho's father.

== Production ==
=== Development ===
"I don't want to create a world where people get caught in the realism of the case itself, then all of a sudden you have people flying around and kicking. I wanted to use the case as more of a driving force of the motion. So when a person's in the action, the audience can feel the emotion behind it. Ultimately, what I want to say is, the film is about driving the audience to synchronize their emotion with how I want them to react, so they get excited and emotionally attached to the story, rather than the subject itself."

— Donnie Yen on the initial challenges while blending the genres of action and legal thrillers

The Prosecutor is loosely based on a real-life case from 2016, involving a teenager Ma Ka-kin, who was accused of drug-trafficking and misled into pleading guilty by his defense lawyer and legal executive in exchange for absolving the second defendant Hung Chi-him from charges. After the case received widespread media attention, the Center for Film and Television of Supreme People's Procuratorate initiated plans to adapt it into a film and approached Mandarin Motion Pictures and Shanghai Huace Film, marking the film as a co-production between Hong Kong and China. Initially, the film was set to be a traditional legal drama, with the Procuratorate comparing its vision to The Shawshank Redemption (1994). During the COVID-19 pandemic, Raymond Wong and Edmond Wong from Mandarin Motion Pictures conducted field research to assess the potential for the adaptation, including discussions with a group of barristers and investigations into drug-trafficking cases worldwide. Edmond Wong, the film's screenwriter, aimed to move away from the stereotypical courtroom dramas often depicted in television series, shifting the screenplay's focus towards crime investigation and creating the protagonist, Fok Chi-ho, a narcotics police detective who transitions to a public prosecutor to drive the story.

In 2023, while in talks to produce a sequel to Flash Point (2007), Raymond Wong showed Donnie Yen the screenplay of The Prosecutor and invited him to star as the lead. Yen initially declined, feeling unfamiliar with the legal drama genre, and hesitant to develop a film that echoed the commercially successful A Guilty Conscience (2023). However, after two months of continued invitations from Wong, Yen finally agreed to join on the condition that the story be rewritten in "a style he was familiar with". Yen signed a deal for a total of three films with Mandarin Motion Pictures, which also included Ip Man 5 and a spin-off for SPL: Sha Po Lang (2005). Among the earliest creative decisions Yen made was to invite veteran actors he admired to join the cast and transform combative dialogue into actual fight scenes, such as an argument between his character and that of Francis Ng. The original screenplay featured only a few fight scenes, with most action sequences added later at the request of the production companies.

=== Pre-production ===
Lau Kong and singer-songwriter MC Cheung Tin-fu were the first two cast members confirmed for the project, with Cheung being handpicked by Yen for a role he deemed suitable. During a meal, Yen recommended Cheung's songs to Raymond and Edmond Wong and suggested he be approached for acting. The film marked Cheung's first foray into action films, and he was initially hesitant to join due to concerns about his physique. Lau was cast by Yen after watching an interview of him and discovering that his real-life experiences closely resembled those of the character Uncle Ma. Yen also invited his friends and fellow actors Ray Lui and Mark Cheng for cameo appearances, with Lui accepted the offer without learning any details about the storyline beforehand, marking his third cameo in Yen's films after Raging Fire (2021) and Sakra (2023). Kent Cheng, Sisley Choi, and Mandy Wong were cast at Yen's request, while Chu Pak Hong was chosen as the defense lawyer as the production team aimed to utilize his ability to bring humor to courtroom scenes alongside a veteran cast. The role of Fok Chi-ho's father was initially slated for a cameo by an established actor until Yen suggested casting his real-life father, Klyster Yen, a retired police officer. Raymond Wong was initially set to portray Judge Hui but later deemed Michael Hui more suitable for the role after further consideration. He reached out to Hui, who agreed to star in the film in exchange for just a cup of coffee after listening to Wong describe the story for five minutes. The 82-year-old Michael Hui initially requested action scenes to be written for him, but Yen declined his request. Wong also invited Liza Wang to make a cameo as the Secretary for Justice, explaining that Wang's casting choice was due to many Secretaries of Justice in Hong Kong are female.

In May 2023, Mandarin Motion Pictures announced the development of a legal thriller under the working title Misjudgement at the 76th Cannes Film Festival, with Donnie Yen attached as the lead actor and Raymond Wong as the producer. Yen also acted as the director and co-producer, while Wong was the primary investor. The film's budget exceeded HK$300 million. (Note: In an interview with Collider, however, Donnie Yen stated that the budget was under US$25 million.) Yen made revisions to the production sets and action choreography before the production commencement based on his experiences from filming John Wick: Chapter 4 (2023), aiming to elevate the film's production values to match Hollywood standards. On 27 September, Yen confirmed that pre-production would soon be wrapped during the 10th Silk Road International Film Festival. In November, Julian Cheung and MC Cheung Tin-fu were announced in lead roles. Adam Pak was revealed to be part of the cast in the same month.

=== Filming ===
Principal photography began in October 2023. Japanese action choreographer Takahito Ouchi acted as the action director, leading a stunt team of nine. A group of Japanese stunt actors also joined the production crew. Due to language barriers, the crew initially struggled with the action choreography, requiring many scenes to be reshot, which delayed the filming schedule. Therefore, Kenji Tanigaki, a Japanese frequent collaborator of Donnie Yen, was invited to assist with coordination. Tanigaki and Yu Kang (who also portrayed a killer in the film) received action director credits. Renee Wong acted as the film's production designer, leading an all-female team of six art designers. The production team categorized the film sets as large, medium, and small, scheduling the largest sets to be filmed first and the smallest last. The large-scale sets included a courtroom and a set resembling the MTR, both of which had a filming period of over two weeks. For the courtroom set, the production design team began construction four months prior to filming, designing it at Shing Fung Film Studio in Sai Kung with a 1:1 scale based on a British courthouse. The MTR scene was filmed on a constructed set at Shaw Studios, featuring 1:1 scale MTR carriages and costing over a million dollars. To simulate the sensation of the train moving, the carriages were placed on tracks to create the illusion of movement during the fight scenes. Construction of the MTR set took one and a half months and primarily used steel to strengthen authenticity. A train platform set was also built, which had to be detached during the action scenes in the carriages. While shooting a scene where Yen was thrown over the shoulder by another actor on the MTR set, he sustained a neck injury and was hospitalized, although no bones were fractured. After completing the large-scale sets, the crew moved on to the medium sets, including scenes set in the Department of Justice offices, where they filmed for three to four days.

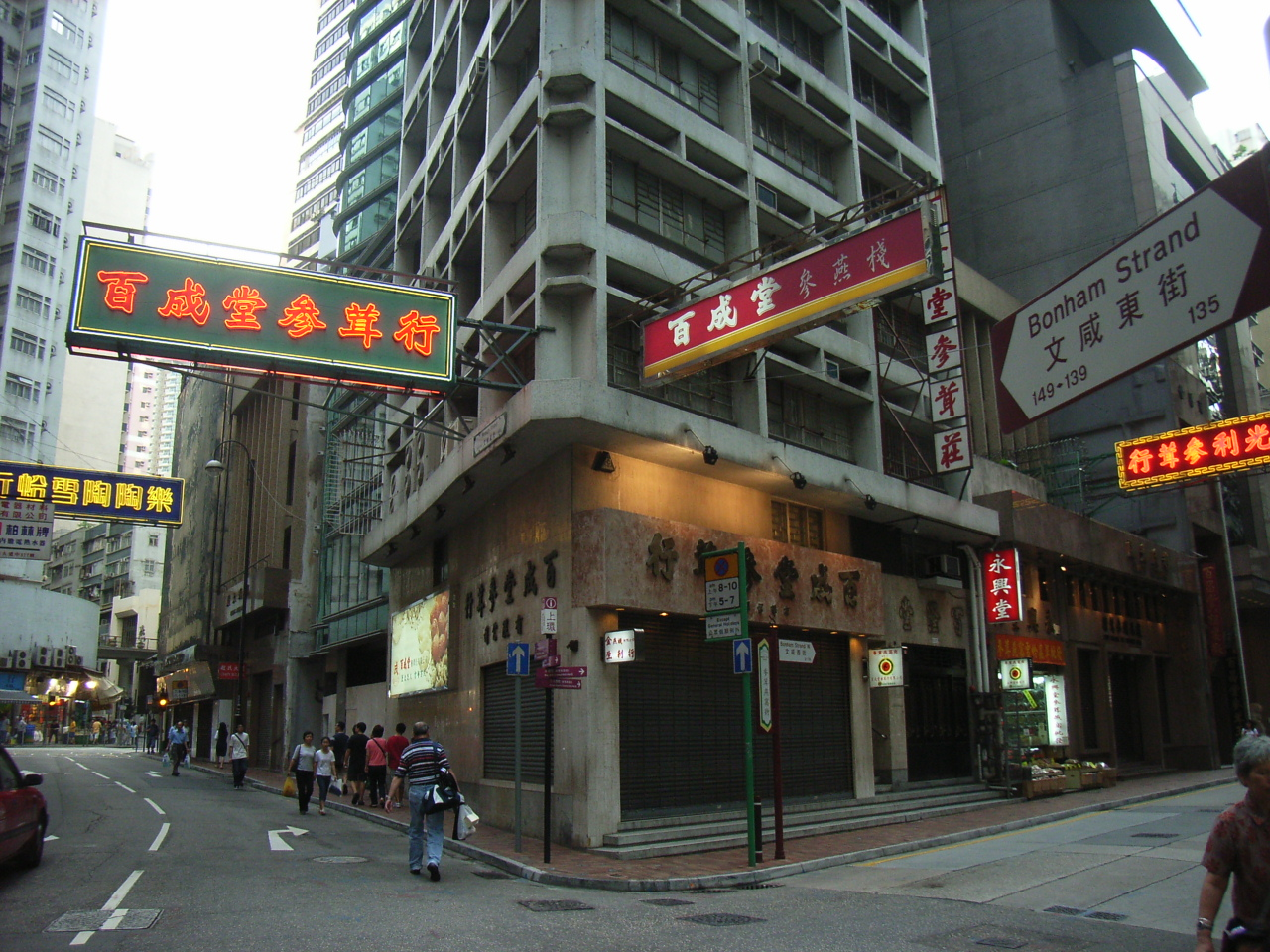
A chase scene featuring Donnie Yen and MC Cheung Tin-fu was filmed at Bonham Strand

On 14 November, filming took place in Sai Wan. Yen then took a brief hiatus to attend an awards ceremony in Singapore, and filming resumed on 19 November in Sai Ying Pun, where Yen and MC Cheung were spotted on set. The scene shot in Sai Ying Pun and Sheung Wan featured a fight scene with Yen and Cheung, featuring Fai Wong Records on Bonham Strand, during a chase sequence. The nightclub fight scene was initially filmed at a disco in Wan Chai, but Yen proposed reshooting the entire sequence after the first scene, finding both the set and the extras "not authentic". He envisioned a set resembling high-end nightclubs in Lan Kwai Fong and suggested hiring foreign extras. The scene was ultimately shot at a private club on Westlands Road in Quarry Bay, and used aerial drones for filming, featuring about 40 to 50 stunt actors performing real actions in a long take without any post-production special effects. The small sets included the lair of the drug-trafficking syndicate, filmed at the abandoned Tat Tak School in Ping Shan, and Uncle Ma's apartment, shot on the rooftop of a building opposite the flagship Sogo store in Causeway Bay, providing views of neon light signs. Filming spanned across January 2024, and ultimately wrapped on 6 February 2024.

=== Post-production ===
Post-production spanned for six months. In May 2024, the film was presented at the project market during the 77th Cannes Film Festival, coinciding with the release of a promotional poster that appeared on the cover of Screen International. An official trailer was released in September, with Francis Ng and Kent Cheng revealed to be part of the cast. In November, Well Go USA Entertainment acquired the North American distribution rights. A 52-minute behind-the-scenes documentary was released in January 2025, chronicling Donnie Yen's entire filmmaking process.

== Release ==
The Prosecutor had its premiere at Tsim Sha Tsui, Hong Kong on 11 December 2024, followed by the Chinese premiere in Beijing on 15 December. The film was theatrically released in Hong Kong and China on 21 and 27 December 2024 respectively. It was also screened in competition at the 27th Far East Film Festival.

== Reception ==
=== Box office ===
The Prosecutor debuted with HK$1.90 million in Hong Kong, rising directly to the top of the box office, and maintained its position for six consecutive days following its release, grossing over HK$5 million during Christmas. It accumulated over HK$18 million after two weeks, and climbed to HK$20 million after 17 days, entering the top 10 highest-grossing Hong Kong films of 2024. The film wrapped up its third week with HK$22 million, leading the weekly box office for three straight weeks, and reached HK$29 million by mid-February, becoming the fifth-highest-grossing 2024 Hong Kong film. Sing Tao Daily described the box office performance as "impressive", Ming Pao found it "satisfactory", and the Hong Kong Economic Times referred to it as "a victory", although it noted that the performance was not particularly remarkable for a Donnie Yen film.

In China, early screenings generated over RMB$128 million, ranking second in the weekly box office while competing with another Hong Kong film, The Last Dance, which held the top position. The film earned over RMB$4 million in its official opening weekend and grossed more than RMB$27.7 million in its first week.

Internationally, The Prosecutor debuted at the top of Taiwan's box office with a gross of over NTD$8 million, and earned over NTD$17 million in its second week, which TVBS described as "a rare success for a Sinophone film in recent years". In Malaysia, the film grossed over RM$2 million within three days of its release. It went on to become the third-highest-grossing 2024 Chinese-language film in the country. In Singapore, the film grossed over SGD$1.33 million as of February 2025, making it the highest grossing Chinese-language film released in 2024 in the country.

=== Critical response ===
The critical response of The Prosecutor was generally regarded as positive both domestically and internationally. On the review aggregator website Rotten Tomatoes, 93% of 29 critics' reviews are positive, with an average rating of 6.8/10. Metacritic, which uses a weighted average, assigned the film a score of 66 out of 100, based on 6 critics, indicating "generally favorable" reviews.

Richard Kuipers of Variety characterized The Prosecutor as "a flashy combination of Hong Kong crime story and legal drama" with "top-notch fighting and action scenes" and "flamboyant and colorful exchanges" in the courtroom, but also noted that its focus on action led to a "[loss] of sharpness as a legal and human drama", lacking the gripping quality in recent successes like The Sparring Partner (2022) and A Guilty Conscience (2023), while its themes of justice appeared "simplistic" and "sometimes contradictory", suggesting that the film might be treading carefully to avoid provoking censors. Jeff Ewing of Collider rated The Prosecutor 7/10, finding it to be "an interesting genre hybrid with some exceptional moments of action and strong character work", but noted that it fell short due to insufficient drama to qualify as a solid legal thriller, a lack of action to be considered a true martial arts film, and an inability to effectively balance characters from vastly different backgrounds, resulting in "missed opportunities". Simon Abrams of RogerEbert.com gave the film 3/4 stars, praising its "heavy-handed" combination of action and legal drama that demonstrates Donnie Yen's action skills and charismatic persona, effectively delivering thrilling sequences with "hokey one-liners" and "rousing action", while also exploring justice within a civic context.

Edmund Lee of South China Morning Post gave The Prosecutor 3/5 stars, praising its action, particularly the "thrilling opening scene" in a first-person shooter style and the "action-packed climax", but lamenting the lackluster portrayal of the villain played by Julian Cheng, which led the film to "morph into a conventional thriller". Lee also ranked the film 16th out of the 36 Hong Kong films theatrically released in 2024. Whang Yee Ling of The Straits Times also gave the film 3/5 stars, describing it as an "energetic but melodramatic blockbuster" that features "explosive action" from the Donnie Yen Stunt Team and a strong performance by Michael Hui, while critiquing its "dense yet simplistic" narrative and overly dramatic elements. Tay Yek Keak of 8days rated the film 3/5 stars as well, lauding the action and the face-off scenes between Donnie Yen and Michael Hui, while noting that the legal settings are underdeveloped and the villains are one-dimensional, yet the film effectively combines genres with moments of humor and social commentary.

David Ehrlich of IndieWire gave the film a B−, also lamenting that the legal case "struggles to match the same intensity" as the action sequences and fails to adequately examine the systemic corruption harming Hong Kong's lower class in a "hurried and ham-fisted" narrative, while also crediting Donnie Yen for venturing into a new genre despite his age and delivering a "charismatic" performance. James Marsh of Deadline Hollywood offered a negative review, criticizing the film as a "slickly polished slice of mainstream entertainment" with action sequences that felt like "late additions" forced in after Donnie Yen's involvement, which failed to meet the expectations of the action fanbase, while it also inadequately addressed the critical issues surrounding the Hong Kong national security laws and the challenges within the legal sector, making its exploration of justice seem "vaguely worded and far-reaching in application".

Ho Siu-bun of am730 called the film a "high-quality Hong Kong action film", acknowledging both the upsides and downsides commonly seen in the genre, complimenting Takahito Ouchi's impressive action choreography and the humor in Michael Hui's performance, while noting that the dramatic elements feel laid-back, with character development being too slow and unclear, and the dialogues being "hilariously predictable". Alex Chung of HK01 called the film a strong entry in the Hong Kong action genre for its blend of action and drama, particularly the "intense" MTR fight scene reminiscent of John Wick: Chapter 4 (2023), commending the performances of the ensemble cast, especially MC Cheung Tin-fu's impressive action work, while noting that the court scenes, although less exciting, still reflect Yen's effort to merge the two genres. Calvin Choi, in his opinion piece for Hong Kong Economic Times, particularly praised Michael Hui's "extremely authentic" portrayal of a judge, noting that Hui's humor, infused with satire and conveyed through his expressions and intonations, made his performance even more impressive compared to the other characters in the film who lacked realism.

=== Awards and nominations ===
Year	Award	Category	Nominee	Result	Ref.
2025	43rd Hong Kong Film Awards	Best Editing	Li Ka-wing	Nominated	
2025	43rd Hong Kong Film Awards	Best Action Choreography	Takahito Ouchi	Nominated	
2025	43rd Hong Kong Film Awards	Best Sound Design	George Lee	Nominated	
2025	27th Far East Film Festival	Golden Mulberry	—N/a	Nominated	
