= My Prince Edward =

2019 Hong Kong film by Norris Wong

- Film poster
- 金都
- Directed by: Norris Wong
- Written by: Norris Wong
- Produced by: Chan Hing-ka; O Sing-pui
- Starring: Stephy Tang; Chu Pak Hong
- Cinematography: Alfred Pong
- Edited by: William Chang; Peter Chung
- Music by: Eman Lam
- Distributed by: Golden Scene
- Release dates: 17 November 2019 (HKAFF); 11 June 2020 (Hong Kong)
- Running time: 91 minutes
- Country: Hong Kong
- Language: Cantonese
- Budget: HK$ 3.25 million (Film Development Fund)

My Prince Edward (Chinese: 金都; Jyutping: Gam1 dou1) is a 2019 Hong Kong romance drama film directed by Norris Wong in her directional debut. It starred Stephy Tang and Chu Pak Hong, who portrayed a pair of lovers experiencing challenges as they prepare to step into marriage. The Chinese and English titles allude to Golden Plaza in Prince Edward, a wedding-themed shopping mall. The film was the winner of 4th First Feature Film Initiative and received funding from the Film Development Fund.

== Plot ==
Cheung Lei-fong 'Fong', who works in a bridal gown rental shop in Golden Plaza, Prince Edward, is in the 8th year of her relationship with Edward Yan, who runs his business as a wedding photographer in the same shopping mall. They are renting a flat above the mall. Despite their plan to move out of the area, Edward's mother negotiates with the owner about buying the flat, much to Fong's dismay, but Edward simply shrugs it off.

Fong learns that the marriage certificate of a divorcee bears a remark and begins to worry about her past. Ten years ago, when she severed ties with her parents, she was introduced by her friend Yee to an agent and entered a sham marriage with a mainlander. The next day, she is told by marriage registration office that she is still legally married to Yang Shuwei, whom she has little memory about, as the agent failed to file for divorce on her behalf. At a loss of what to do, Fong attempts to seek help from Yee, only to be led to a public proposal party. Before Fong can respond, Edward puts the engagement ring on her finger. She declines to hold a wedding banquet for fear that her secret will be exposed.

Fong posts a tracing notice for Yang on a newspaper and he finally shows up. He agrees to jointly file for divorce, which will take immediate effect, only if Fong helps him in applying for a one-way permit, which will allow him to apply for emigration to New York City. Fong would rather wait for unilateral divorce to take effect, but her plan is frustrated as Edward's mother decides to hold a grand banquet the next year. Left with no alternatives, Fong agrees to fake daily life photos with Yang and Yang thrusts a pile of cash into her hands. There, Fong contemplates buying a long table but votes against it as it realistically wouldn't fit in her small flat. Yang notices Edward constantly bombarding Fong with instant messages and questions her decision to give up her freedom.

Edward discovers a copy of her marriage record in her handbag and furiously questions her. Fong confesses to her past and expresses deep regrets. The pair has a brief fight but quickly makes up. The next morning, Fong has to travel to Fuzhou for a face-to-face interview, which Edward attempts to stop but in vain. She meets Yang's girlfriend and overhears that she is pregnant, forcing Yang to rethink his migration plan. Keeping mobile data switched off during her journey, Fong returns to Hong Kong but her attitude towards Edward has changed.

One day, a message from Yang triggers the most serious quarrel between them, with Fong disclosing for the first time her dissatisfaction about the wedding arrangements and his mother's intervention. Having abandoned his migration plan, Yang is willing to file for divorce immediately. Fong resigns from her job to get ready for her new life. However, when she returns home, she finds her turtle was released by her future mother-in-law. She rushes to a nearby pond in an attempt to recover her turtle and complains to Edward about the loss of freedom. Edward lovingly assures her they will remain the way they have been.

Early next morning, Fong leaves Edward a sticky note a reminder of his bad habit and boards a bus to Fuzhou, where she returns the cash to Yang. When she switches on mobile data, she ignores Edward's messages and orders a long table of her own choice.

== Cast ==
- Stephy Tang as Cheung Lei-fong 'Fong'
- Chu Pak Hong as Edward Yan Chun-wing
- Jin Kai-jie as Yang Shuwei
- Nina Paw as Edward's mother
- Eman Lam as Yee
- Siuyea Lo as Groom
- Chan Kin-long as Real estate agent

== Production ==
Norris Wong is a resident of Allied Plaza, right opposite to Golden Plaza, and set the story in the area where she grew up. Wong won the 4th First Feature Film Initiative (Higher Education Institutions Group) with My Prince Edward in 2018. With shoestring budget, the filming of an important quarrel scene ran overtime, but Stephy Tang volunteered to act without extra pay. After working on a 110-minute version by Peter Chung, Wong sought opinion from William Chang, who did the final cut himself.

== Release ==
My Prince Edward was the closing film of 2019 Hong Kong Asian Film Festival. The film was scheduled for public release in mid-April 2020, but was postponed to June as cinemas were closed due to coronavirus disease. Cheng Cheng Films has bought the distribution rights in North America.

== Awards and nominations ==
Award	Category	Recipients	Result
56th Golden Horse Awards	Best Leading Actor	Chu Pak Hong	Nominated
56th Golden Horse Awards	Best Original Film Song	"My Prince Edward"	Nominated
56th Golden Horse Awards	Best New Director	Norris Wong	Nominated
26th Hong Kong Film Critics Society Award	Best Director	Norris Wong	Nominated
26th Hong Kong Film Critics Society Award	Best Screenplay	Norris Wong	Won
26th Hong Kong Film Critics Society Award	Best Film	My Prince Edward	Nominated
26th Hong Kong Film Critics Society Award	Films of Merit	My Prince Edward	Won
26th Hong Kong Film Critics Society Award	Best Actor	Chu Pak Hong	Nominated
26th Hong Kong Film Critics Society Award	Best Actress	Stephy Tang	Nominated
12th Hong Kong Film Directors' Guild Awards	Best New Director	Norris Wong	Won
3rd The Kongest Film Awards	Panel's Choice for the Kongest Film	My Prince Edward	Nominated
3rd The Kongest Film Awards	My Favourite Film	My Prince Edward	Nominated
3rd The Kongest Film Awards	Kongest Actor	Chu Pak Hong	Nominated
3rd The Kongest Film Awards	Kongest Actress	Stephy Tang	Nominated
3rd The Kongest Film Awards	Kongest Director	Norris Wong	Won
39th Hong Kong Film Awards	Best Screenplay	Norris Wong	Nominated
39th Hong Kong Film Awards	Best New Director	Norris Wong	Won
39th Hong Kong Film Awards	Best Actor	Chu Pak Hong	Nominated
39th Hong Kong Film Awards	Best Actress	Stephy Tang	Nominated
39th Hong Kong Film Awards	Best Supporting Actress	Nina Paw	Nominated
39th Hong Kong Film Awards	Best Editing	William Chang, Peter Chung	Nominated
39th Hong Kong Film Awards	Best Original Film Score	Eman Lam	Won
39th Hong Kong Film Awards	Best Original Film Song	"My Prince Edward"	Nominated
2020 Hong Kong Screenwriters' Guild Awards	Recommended Character	Edward	Nominated
2020 Hong Kong Screenwriters' Guild Awards	Recommended Screenplay	Norris Wong	Nominated
2020 "I Support Hong Kong Film" Awards	Most Supported Actress	Stephy Tang	Nominated
2020 "I Support Hong Kong Film" Awards	Most Supported Actor	Chu Pak Hong	Nominated
2020 "I Support Hong Kong Film" Awards	Most Supported Supporting Actress	Nina Paw	Won
