= Sabrina Ng =

Hong Kong actress (born 1996/1997)

- 吳冰
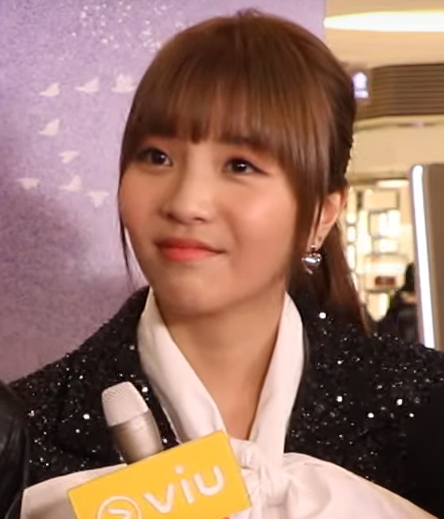
- Ng in October 2023
- Born: Ng Ping; 1996 or 1997 (age 29–30); Hong Kong
- Education: Hong Kong Design Institute (HD)
- Occupation: Actress
- Years active: 2019–present

Sabrina Ng Ping (Chinese: 吳冰; born 1996/1997) is a Hong Kong actress and a member of YouTube sketch comedy group Pomato best known for her lead and titular role in romance film Say I Do To Me (2023), which earned her a nomination for Best New Performer in the 42nd Hong Kong Film Awards. She also starred in lead roles in the drama films Time Still Turns the Pages (2023) and The Lyricist Wannabe (2024).

== Biography ==
Ng was born in 1996 or 1997. She studied at Salesian Yip Hon Millennium Primary School and was classmates with singer Edan Lui. She later attended Hong Kong Design Institute and graduated with a higher diploma in film, television and photography. After graduation, she began to work as a freelance post-production editor. In 2016, she met one of the founding members of YouTube comedy skits group Pomato and was invited to join the group as a regular cast member. She began to appear in the short films and online videos produced by Pomato and received public attention. Ng also appeared in ViuTV anthology series The Republic and the music video of Dear Jane's "Galactic Repairman" in 2019 and 2020 respectively. She also made a cameo appearance in 2022 drama series The Parents League as the younger version of Gigi Leung's character.

In 2023, Ng auditioned and was cast in the lead and titular role in Kiwi Chow's romance film Say I Do To Me. She portrayed a social media influencer who staged a "sologamy" to seek attention on the internet, which earned her a nomination for Best New Performer in the 42nd Hong Kong Film Awards. She also starred in the 2023 drama film Time Still Turns the Pages as a student suffering from depression. In 2024, Ng was cast in a lead role in drama film The Lyricist Wannabe.

== Filmography ==
=== Film ===
Year	Title	Role	Notes/Ref.
2023	Say I Do To Me	Cheung Ping (張冰)	
2023	Time Still Turns the Pages	Wong Ka-Yee (黃家怡)	
2024	The Lyricist Wannabe	Chick (何雞)	

=== Television ===
Year	Title	Role	Notes/Ref.
2019	The Republic	Lindy	Guest role
2022	The Parents League	Young Cheung Nok Nga (張諾雅)	Guest role

== Awards and nominations ==
Year	Award	Category	Work	Result	Ref.
2024	42nd Hong Kong Film Awards	Best New Performer	Say I Do To Me	Nominated	
