= Norris Wong =

Hong Kong film director and screenwriter

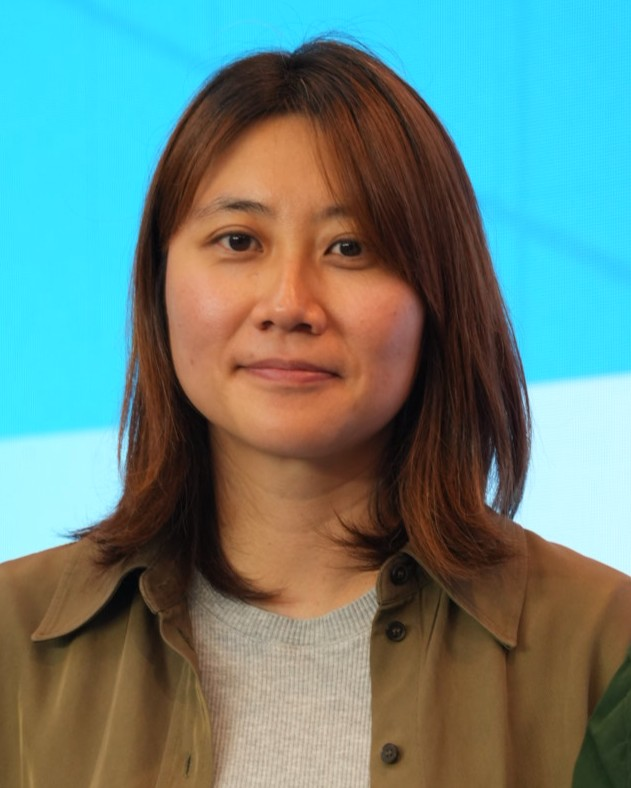
- Wong at 2026 Shanghai International Film Festival
- Education: Hong Kong Baptist University (MFA)
- Notable work: My Prince Edward (2019)

Chinese name
- Traditional Chinese: 黃綺琳
Transcriptions

Norris Wong Yee-lam (Chinese: 黃綺琳; born 1980s; 38–39) is a Hong Kong novelist, songwriter, screenwriter, and director. She made her feature length directorial debut with My Prince Edward (2019), for which she won the Award for Best New Director and was nominated for Best Screenplay at the 39th Hong Kong Film Awards.

== Early life ==
Wong grew up in Prince Edward, Hong Kong.

Wong received her first degree in biology. She received her master's degree from Hong Kong Baptist University's film school in 2012. After graduation, she focused on writing due to the lack of opportunities for new directors.

== Career ==
After graduation, she got a job at television station HKTV, which had just opened, as a screenwriter.

Wong wrote the script for My Prince Edward about a newly engaged Hong Kong woman trying to get out of her past secret sham marriage in May 2017. The film received funding from the First Feature Film Initiative. Stephy Tang signed on after reading the script through the program. The film has gone on to be nominated in several Asian film award ceremonies, including at the 56th Golden Horse Awards and the 39th Hong Kong Film Awards, where Wong won the Award for Best New Director.

Wong announced on July 13, 2020 that her second feature film would be executively produced by Mabel Cheung and Alex Law as part of Hong Kong's HK$100,000,000 (US$12,900,000) Directors’ Succession Scheme aimed at supporting local films.

== Style and influence ==
Wong cites the Coen brothers, Ang Lee, and Charlie Kaufman as her influences.

== Filmography ==
Year	Title	Original title	Director	Writer	Notes
2012	From Here to There	赤鱲角到天水圍是我愛你最佳距離	Yes	Yes	short
2013	Fall	落踏	Yes	Yes	
2016	Sisterhood	骨妹	No	No	Assistant writer
2016	Where Are You Going	妳往何處去	No	No	Assistant director; by Zheng-fan Yang
2018	Down There	那里	No	No	Assistant director; short by Zheng-fan Yang
2019	My Prince Edward	金都	Yes	Yes	
2022	Let It Ghost	猛鬼3寶	No	Yes	
2024	The Lyricist Wannabe	填詞L	Yes	Yes	

== Awards and nominations ==
Year	Award	Category	Film	Result	Notes
2019	56th Golden Horse Awards	Best New Director	My Prince Edward	Nominated	
2019	56th Golden Horse Awards	Best Original Film Song	My Prince Edward	Nominated	Song Lyrics
2019	26th Hong Kong Film Critics Society Award	Best Director	My Prince Edward	Nominated	
2019	26th Hong Kong Film Critics Society Award	Best Screenplay	My Prince Edward	Won	
2020	12th Hong Kong Film Directors' Guild Awards	Best New Director	My Prince Edward	Nominated	
2020	2020 Hong Kong Screenwriters' Guild Awards	Recommended Screenplay	My Prince Edward	Nominated	
2020	39th Hong Kong Film Awards	Best Screenplay	My Prince Edward	Nominated	
2020	39th Hong Kong Film Awards	Best New Director	My Prince Edward	Won	
2020	39th Hong Kong Film Awards	Best Original Film Song	My Prince Edward	Nominated	Song Lyrics
