= 41st Hong Kong Film Awards =

2023 Hong Kong Film Awards

- Official poster
- Awarded for: Excellence in cinematic achievements
- Presented on: April 16, 2023
- Site: Hong Kong Cultural Centre
- Organised by: Hong Kong Film Awards Association
- Official website: Hong Kong Film Awards

Highlights
- Best Film: To My Nineteen Year-Old Self
- Best Director: Wai Ka-fai; Detective vs Sleuths
- Best Actor: Sean Lau; Detective vs Sleuths
- Best Actress: Sammi Cheng; Lost Love
- Most awards: 4 — Detective vs Sleuths
- Most nominations: 16 — The Sparring Partner

Television coverage
- Channel: ViuTV
- Network: HK Television Entertainment

The 41st Hong Kong Film Awards presentation ceremony took place at Hong Kong Cultural Centre on 16 April 2023. Nominations were announced on 9 February 2023. The Sparring Partner received 16 nominations most for any film and Detective vs Sleuths, Warriors of Future, and Table for Six with 11 nominations each were second.

To My Nineteen Year-Old Self surprisingly won the Best Film award, which made the first time in history a Hong Kong documentary film won this award; while Wai Ka-fai won the Best Director award for his work on Detective vs Sleuths. Detective vs Sleuths won most awards at the ceremony.

== Winners and nominees ==
Sources: Nominations

Winners are listed first, highlighted in boldface, and indicated with a double dagger ‡.

**Best Film**: **To My Nineteen Year Old Self — Eunice Wong, producer**‡; The Sparring Partner — Philip Yung, producer; Warriors of Future — Tang Wai-but, producer; Detective vs Sleuths — Wai Ka-fai, Jason Siu and Elaine Chu, producers; The Narrow Road — Mani Man, producer	**Best Director**: **Wai Ka-fai — Detective vs Sleuths**‡; Ho Cheuk Tin — The Sparring Partner; Lam Sum — The Narrow Road; Mabel Cheung, William Kwok — To My Nineteen Year Old Self; Sunny Chan — Table for Six
**Best Screenplay**: **Wai Ka-fai, Ryker Chan, Mak Tin Shu — Detective vs Sleuths**‡; Frankie Tam, Oliver Yip, Thomas Leung — The Sparring Partner; Lau Kok Rui — The Sunny Side of the Street; Fean Chung — The Narrow Road; Sunny Chan — Table for Six	**Best Actor**: **Sean Lau — Detective vs Sleuths**‡; Mak Pui-tung — The Sparring Partner; Yeung Wai-lun — The Sparring Partner; Anthony Wong — The Sunny Side of the Street; Louis Cheung — The Narrow Road
**Best Actress**: **Sammi Cheng — Lost Love**‡; Louisa So — The Sparring Partner; Teresa Mo — Mama's Affair; Angela Yuen — The Narrow Road; Sylvia Chang — A Light Never Goes Out	**Best Supporting Actor**: **Michael Hui — Where the Wind Blows**‡; Jan Lamb — The Sparring Partner; Law Wing-cheong — Mama's Affair; Louis Cheung — Table for Six; Peter Chan — Table for Six
**Best Supporting Actress**: **Ivana Wong — Table for Six**‡; Harriet Yeung — The Sparring Partner; Patra Au — The Narrow Road; Lin Min Chen — Table for Six; Jennifer Yu — Far Far Away	**Best New Performer**: **Sahal Zaman — The Sunny Side of the Street**‡; Jer Lau — Mama's Affair; Edan Lui — Hong Kong Family; Henick Chou — A Light Never Goes Out; Edan Lui — Chilli Laugh Story
**Best Cinematography**: **Cheng Siu-Keung — Detective vs Sleuths**‡; Leung Yau Cheong — The Sparring Partner; Ng Kai Ming — Warriors of Future; Chin Ting-chang, Meng Qing, Tsui Siu Kong — Where the Wind Blows; Meteor Cheung Yu Hon — The Narrow Road	**Best Film Editing**: **J.Him Lee, Zhang Zhao, Jojo Shek — The Sparring Partner**‡; Wong Hoi, Kenny Luk — Warriors of Future; David Richardson, Allen Leung — Detective vs Sleuths; William Kwok, Nose Chan — To My Nineteen Year Old Self; Cheung Ka-fai, Cheng Wai Lun — Table for Six
**Best Art Direction**: **Bill Lui, Andrew Wong — Where the Wind Blows**‡; Ida Mak — The Sparring Partner; Alex Mok, Lam Wai Kin — Warriors of Future; Jean Tsoi — Detective vs Sleuths; Irving Cheung, Leung Tsz Yin — Table for Six	**Best Costume & Make Up Design**: **Dora Ng, Petra Kwok — Where the Wind Blows**‡; Cheung Siu Hong — Warriors of Future; Man Lim Chung, Kwok In Wai Vann — Lost Love; Stanley Cheung, Pat Tang — Detective vs Sleuths; Bonnie Ho — The Narrow Road
**Best Action Choreography**: **Jack Wong Wai Leung — Warriors of Future**‡; Sammo Hung, Jimmy Hung, Yuen Wo-ping — Septet: The Story of Hong Kong; Lin Feng, Stephen Tung — The Battle at Lake Changjin II; Wong Chi Man — Where the Wind Blows; Jack Wong Wai Leung — Detective vs Sleuths	**Best Original Film Score**: **Wong Hin Yan — The Narrow Road**‡; Sara Fung Chi Han — The Sparring Partner; Chan Kwong-wing — Warriors of Future; Ding Ke, Sara Fung Chi Han — Where the Wind Blows; Alan Wong Ngai Lun, Janet Yung Wai Ying — Table for Six
**Best Original Film Song**: **Live a Life — Lost Love**; **Composer：Hans Wing**; **Lyricist：Lin Ruo Ning**; **Vocal Artist：Sammi Cheng**‡; Twisted Fate — The Sparring Partner; Composer：Sara Fung Chi Han, Kenny Wong; Lyricist：Morgan Cheung; Vocal Artist：Hung Kaho; Tomorrow, and Tomorrow — Warriors of Future; Composer：Chan Kwong-wing; Lyricist：Oscar; Vocal Artist：Ansonbean, Winka@COLLAR; Forever — Mama's Affair; Composer：Alan Wong Ngai Lun, Janet Yung Wai Ying; Lyricist：Chan Wing Him; Vocal Artist：Keung To; Hate, Love, Hate, Love You — Table for Six; Composer & Vocal Artist：Ivana Wong; Lyricist：Sunny Chan	**Best Visual Effects**: **Chas Chau Chi Shing, Leung Wai Kit, Kwok Tai, Law May — Warriors of Future**‡; Shigeharu Tomotoshi — The Sparring Partner; Tsui Hark, Dennis Yeung, Wang Lei — The Battle at Lake Changjin II; Shigeharu Tomotoshi — Where the Wind Blows; Don Ma, Chan Wah, Specta Wong, Jacky Chung — Detective vs Sleuths
**Best Sound Design**: **Nopawat Likitwong, Stan Yau, Sarunyu Nurnsai, Dhanarat Dhitirojana — Warriors of Future**‡; Tu Duu-Chih, Chiang Yi Chen — The Sparring Partner; Steve Burgess, Wang Danrong, Yin Jie — The Battle at Lake Changjin II; Tu Duu-Chih, Wu Shu Yao — Where the Wind Blows; Thomas Cheng, Vincent Tam, Chill Yang — Detective vs Sleuths	**Best New Director**: **Ho Cheuk Tin — The Sparring Partner**‡; Lau Kok Rui — The Sunny Side of the Street; Ng Yuen Fai — Warriors of Future; Lam Sum — The Narrow Road; Sunny Chan — Table for Six
**Best Asian Chinese Language Film**: **In Search of Lost Time** (China) ‡; Goddamned Asura (Taiwan); Moon Man (China)
**Lifetime Achievement**: **Bowie Woo**‡	**Professional Achievement**: **Law Kar**‡; **Sek Kei**‡

== Films that received multiple nominations ==
Films that received multiple nominations
Nominations	Film
16	The Sparring Partner
11	Warriors of Future
11	Detective vs Sleuths
11	Table for Six
10	The Narrow Road
8	Where the Wind Blows
4	The Sunny Side of the Street
4	Mama's Affair
3	To My Nineteen Year Old Self
3	Lost Love
3	The Battle at Lake Changjin II
2	A Light Never Goes Out

== Films that received multiple awards ==
Films that received multiple awards
Awards	Film
4	Detective vs Sleuths
3	Where the Wind Blows
3	Warriors of Future
2	The Sparring Partner
2	Lost Love
