= Table for Six =

2022 Hong Kong film by Sunny Chan

- Promotional poster
- Traditional Chinese: 飯戲攻心
- Simplified Chinese: 饭戏攻心
- Literal meaning: The Rice Scene Attacking the Heart
- Hanyu Pinyin: Fàn xì gōngxīn
- Jyutping: Faan6 hei3 gung1 sam1
- Directed by: Sunny Chan
- Written by: Sunny Chan
- Produced by: Bill Kong; Ivy Ho; Tang Wai-But
- Starring: Dayo Wong; Stephy Tang; Louis Cheung; Ivana Wong; Lin Min Chen; Peter Chan
- Cinematography: Meteory Cheung Yu-Hon
- Edited by: Cheung Ka-Fai; Alan Cheng
- Music by: Alan Wong Ngai-Lun; Janet Yung Wai-Ying
- Production companies: Edko Films; One Cool Film Production; Irresistible Beta Limited
- Distributed by: Anle Videos
- Release dates: April 2022 (Far East Film Festival); 8 September 2022
- Running time: 116 minutes
- Country: Hong Kong
- Language: Cantonese
- Box office: est. HK$74.54 million (US$9.59 million)

Table for Six (Chinese: 飯戲攻心; lit: Heart Attack) is a 2022 Hong Kong comedy film written and directed by Sunny Chan. It was written as a sequel to the 2015 short film Table for Three. The film is centered around the classical Chinese motifs of shared meals and dysfunctional family ties. It was initially scheduled to be released on 1 February 2022, the first day of the Lunar New Year, but it was postponed until 8 September 2022 due to the COVID-19 pandemic.

It was selected at the 24th edition of the Far East Film Festival held from 22 April 2022 to 30 April 2022, where it had its world premiere and its nomination for Best Screenplay Award. Later it was also invited to the 21st New York Asian Film Festival in the crowd pleasures section, where it had its North American premiere on 23 July.

A thematic sequel to the film, Table for Six 2, was released on 9 February 2024 during Chinese New Year's Eve.

== Synopsis ==
In the comedy, three brothers reside in a home that they have inherited from their late parents. The eldest brother, Steve, is theoretically the man of the house but is constantly criticised by his two younger brothers, Bernard and Lung, for his decisions, the inedible meals he cooks, and his complicated romantic encounters. To prepare for a family reunion dinner, Steve seeks the help of Lung’s girlfriend, Josephine, and wins back their hearts for a while, until Monica, his former lover and Bernard’s new girlfriend, shows up. The unexpected visit of "Meow", a web idol and Steve’s part-time girlfriend, further escalates the siblings' conflict.

== Cast ==
- Dayo Wong as Steve Chan
- Stephy Tang as Monica
- Louis Cheung as Bernard Chan
- Ivana Wong as Josephine
- Lin Min Chen as Meow
- Peter Chan as Lung Chan
- Fish Liew as the mother of Bernard and Lung
- Rik Ching as Esports teammate

In addition to the main cast, Louis Koo, Kenny Wong, Jennifer Yu, Tony Wu, Louise Wong, Philip Keung, Locker Lam, Ansonbean, Ng Siu Hin and Ling Man-lung make cameo appearances in a promotional easter egg.

== Release ==
The film was initially planned to be released on 1 February 2022 but was postponed until 8 September 2022 due to the COVID-19 pandemic. It was selected at the 24th edition of Far East Film Festival held from 22 April 2022 to 30 April 2022.

It was invited at the 21st New York Asian Film Festival, where it was screened at Asia Society on July 23 for its North American premiere.

== Reception ==
=== Box office ===
Table for Six has grossed a total of US$19.75 million worldwide combining its box office gross from Hong Kong (US$5.53), and China (US$15.79 million).

As of 25 September 2022 the film is the second highest-grossing, Hong Kong-produced film released in the year 2022 with gross of HK$42,961,378.

In the five weeks since the opening of the film, the cumulative box office exceeded 74.54 million Hong Kong dollars, breaking the box office record of Anita of 62.52 million, becoming the third highest-grossing domestic film in Hong Kong at that time.

=== Critical response ===
Tara Judah of Screen Daily reviewing the film for Far East Film Festival stated that "Sunny Chan serves up a light-hearted, soft-boiled comedy about misguided romance." Concluding Judah wrote, "Chan plays every narrative beat for laughs. While this approach makes the film easy to digest, it also means it misses out on the emotional payoff that comes with slightly higher – or at least somewhat consequential – stakes."

== Accolades ==
Year	Award	Category	Recipient(s)	Result	Ref.
2022	24th Udine Far East Film Festival	Best Screenplay Award	Table for Six	Nominated	
2023	Hong Kong Film Award	Best Director	Sunny Chan	Nominated	
2023	Hong Kong Film Award	Best Screenplay	Sunny Chan	Nominated	
2023	Hong Kong Film Award	Best Supporting Actor	Louis Cheung	Nominated	
2023	Hong Kong Film Award	Best Supporting Actor	Peter Chan	Nominated	
2023	Hong Kong Film Award	Best Supporting Actress	Ivana Wong	Won	
2023	Hong Kong Film Award	Best Supporting Actress	Lin Min Chen	Nominated	
2023	Hong Kong Film Award	Best Editing	Cheung Ka Fai, Cheng Wai Lun	Nominated	
2023	Hong Kong Film Award	Best Art Direction	Irving Cheung, Leung Tsz Yin	Nominated	
2023	Hong Kong Film Award	Best Original Film Score	Alan Wong Ngai Lun, Janet Yung Wai Ying	Nominated	
2023	Hong Kong Film Award	Best Original Film Song	"I love you so much" Composer & Vocal Artist：Ivana Wong; Lyricist：Sunny Chan	Nominated	
2023	Hong Kong Film Award	Best New Director	Sunny Chan	Nominated	
