= Table for Six 2 =

2024 Hong Kong film by Sunny Chan

- Theatrical release poster
- Traditional Chinese: 飯戲攻心2
- Jyutping: Faan^{6} Hei^{3} Gung^{1} Sam^{1} Ji^{6}
- Directed by: Sunny Chan
- Screenplay by: Sunny Chan
- Produced by: Bill Kong
- Starring: Stephy Tang; Louis Cheung; Ivana Wong; Lin Min Chen; Peter Chan; Tse Kwan-ho; Jeffrey Ngai; Dee Ho
- Cinematography: Meteor Cheung
- Edited by: Alan Cheng
- Music by: Alan Wong; Janet Yung; Kenny Chung
- Production companies: Edko Films; Irresistible Beta; One Cool Film Production; Tao Piao Piao
- Distributed by: Edko Films
- Release date: 9 February 2024 (Hong Kong)
- Running time: 132 minutes
- Country: Hong Kong
- Language: Cantonese

Table for Six 2 (Chinese: 飯戲攻心2) is a 2024 Hong Kong comedy film directed and written by Sunny Chan. The film is a sequel to Table for Six (2022), with Stephy Tang, Louis Cheung, Ivana Wong, Lin Min Chen, and Peter Chan reprising their roles, though Dayo Wong, the lead actor from the first film, does not return for undisclosed reasons. It is set two years after the first film, and revolves around three wedding banquets for the Chan family, as the members navigate the meaning of love and family bonding in the absence of their eldest brother (Dayo Wong).

Following the commercial success of Table for Six, Sunny Chan began preparing for the sequel before the first film's theatrical run ended and started developing the screenplay in February 2023. Principal photography took place under wraps in Hong Kong starting in July, with Edko Films publicly announcing the production in October. The film features a theme song "I Love You So Much", composed and performed by lead actress Ivana Wong with lyrics written by Chan.

The film was theatrically released in Hong Kong on 9 February 2024, as a Chinese New Year film for the Year of Dragon. It became the highest-grossing 2024 Hong Kong New Year film, as well as the fourth highest-grossing 2024 Hong Kong film overall for the year.

== Plot ==
Two years after the events of Table for Six, Steve (played by Dayo Wong), the eldest half-brother of the Chan siblings, leaves for Africa without leaving any messages. Though their relationship status remains uncertain, Steve's girlfriend Meow stays with the Chan family and grows closer to them. Meanwhile, Bernard, the middle half-brother who runs a PR agency, tries to stage a fake wedding between his younger half-brother Lung and Meow to capitalize on their celebrity status. However, when Meow accidentally slaps Lung during a forced kiss for the press, the plan falters, especially due to Lung's jealous girlfriend, Josephine. She wants to fulfill her grandmother's dying wish to see her married, prompting her and Lung to plan a real wedding. In turn, Bernard decides to publicly fake propose to his long-time girlfriend Monica. But due to a miscommunication with Meow, Monica believes the proposal is sincere and accepts it with emotion.

On Lung's wedding day, Lung panics when he loses his wedding ring. He fabricates a story about wanting to rehearse putting the ring on Josephine's finger and measures her size. When he rushes out to buy a new one, he is trapped in the elevator and gets delayed. Bernard and Monica greet the Chan relatives, who mistakenly think Monica is still Steve's girlfriend. Before she can clarify, the uncles express their disdain for an uncle who has an affair with a sister-in-law, leading Bernard and Monica to claim she is Steve's sister instead. Bernard meets a famous magician Hugh, who turns out to be his distant cousin. Hugh proposes to stage the wedding at Ocean Park with gimmicks to attract attention, and Bernard agrees. As they wait for Lung, Josephine fears he might be a runaway. With pressure mounting from the civil celebrant and guests, Bernard pretends to be Lung by wearing a robot costume to start the ceremony. When Lung finally arrives, Josephine has already exchanged vows and rings with the disguised Bernard, doing it only as a show for her grandmother. She gives Lung a final kiss and breaks up with him afterwards.

On Bernard's wedding day, Lung informs him that Hugh has overspent their budget with extravagant features. They confront Hugh, who reveals he has made a deal with Ocean Park for future events, provided they accommodate their sixth uncle, a shark fin seller. Meanwhile, Meow approaches singer Mark Gor, who is actually Monica's long-lost half-brother. She asks him to feign mistreatment by his father, but when he confides that his father never took him to Ocean Park, it sparks a deeper connection with Monica. As the ceremony begins, Monica learns her shark fin dress is made from imitation shark fin. In an effort to boost his failing video game project, Lung announces his reconciliation with Meow, drawing jealousy from Josephine, who reveals her lingering feelings for him. Monica and Bernard try to comfort Josephine, but it triggers Meow, who complains that she has done so much for the family while everyone neglects her own feelings. In response, Josephine reveals that Steve left to silently break up with her, but even though she is no longer Steve's girlfriend, the Chan family still considers her one of their own, mending their relationships. During the wedding, the sixth uncle mistakenly refers to Monica as Steve's girlfriend, igniting tensions. He accuses Bernard of stealing his brother's girlfriend, leading to chaos as social media influencers stir the pot. The Chan family rushes to protect Bernard, who finds solace in the aquarium, where Monica comforts him. Despite the chaos, they complete their wedding ceremony. Later, as the family enjoys a poon choi meal, the sixth uncle apologizes to Bernard, revealing his own struggles. Seeing this, Lung realizes his love for Josephine and proposes again. Finally, Meow decides to travel to Africa to find Steve, with the Chan family sending her off.

== Cast ==
- Stephy Tang as Monica, a cultural conservationist and Bernard's long-time girlfriend
- Louis Cheung as Bernard Chan, a wedding planning company executive and Lung and Steve's half-brother
- Ivana Wong as Josephine, a well-known chef and Lung's long-time girlfriend
- Lin Min Chen as Meow, a Taiwanese social media influencer who became the girlfriend of Steve Chan (Dayo Wong) in Table for Six (2022)
- Peter Chan as Lung Chan, an esports player and Bernard and Steve's half-brother
- Tse Kwan-ho as Sixth uncle, a shark fin seller and sponsor of the Chan family weddings
- Jeffrey Ngai as Mark Gor, a popular idol and the estranged brother of Monica
- Dee Ho as Hugh, a distant cousin of the Chan siblings

Also appearing in the film are members of the Chan family, including Bowie Wu as the great-uncle; Peter Lai as the third uncle; Ram Chiang as the seventh uncle; Tony Wu as the great-uncle's son (the Chan siblings' cousin); and Fish Liew reprising her role as the deceased mother of the Chan siblings. In addition, Law Lan and Michelle Yim appear as Josephine's grandmother and mother, while Jennifer Yu appears as Miss Smile, a Japan-based client of Meow. Other wedding attendees include Renci Yeung as Lucy, a lawyer and civil celebrant; Ling Man-lung as Beanpole, a dance tutor; Locker Lam as Tiny Head, a social media influencer; and Ng Wing-sze as Ling, a journalist.

== Production ==
=== Development ===
"In the first movie, I focused on a family reunion through five meals at home. And this time, the story revolves around three opulent wedding banquets. In this film, I try to explore what love is and what makes a family."

— Sunny Chan, the director and writer, on the themes of Table for Six 2

Due to the commercial success of Table for Six (2022), which had held the record for the second highest-grossing Hong Kong film of all time, director-screenwriter Sunny Chan planned to produce a sequel before the end of its theatrical run. Chan began writing the screenplay in February 2023, following the stage play adaptation of the first film, describing the creative process as "rushed". He initially conceived the project as a standalone sequel unrelated to the first film, featuring an entirely different cast and story similar to All's Well, Ends Well (1992) and it sequel All's Well, Ends Well 1997 (1997), but he appreciated the performances and unique family dynamics of the first film's characters and chose to continue their story instead. Chan noted that he drew inspiration from the American sitcom Friends when creating the six main characters, which significantly shortened the screenwriting process since he did not need to invent new characters. In the first film, the narrative revolves around five family meals at the characters' home, while Chan maintained a similar structure by intertwining the entire story with three wedding banquets, aiming to examine love and family as the characters confront each other's personal struggles in the second film. On 6 October 2023, Edko Films announced the production of Table for Six 2 on social media, confirming that Fish Liew would reprise her cameo role as the Chan siblings' mother, while new additions to the cast included Peter Lai, Tse Kwan-ho, Ram Chiang, Law Lan, Michelle Yim, Bowie Wu, Dee Ho, Tony Wu, Jeffrey Ngai, Jennifer Yu, Renci Yeung, Ling Man-lung, and Locker Lam, although it was not confirmed whether the six lead actors from the first film would return. Most of the cast members were from the TVB series Heart of Greed (2007) or the New Year film A Guilty Conscience (2023). Chan specifically cast Ling Man-lung after collaborating with him on the stage play Yat-sen (2022), where Ling also spent three days helping to choreograph the dance sequence in the film. The film was presented at TIFFCOM, the film market of the Tokyo International Film Festival, in the same month.

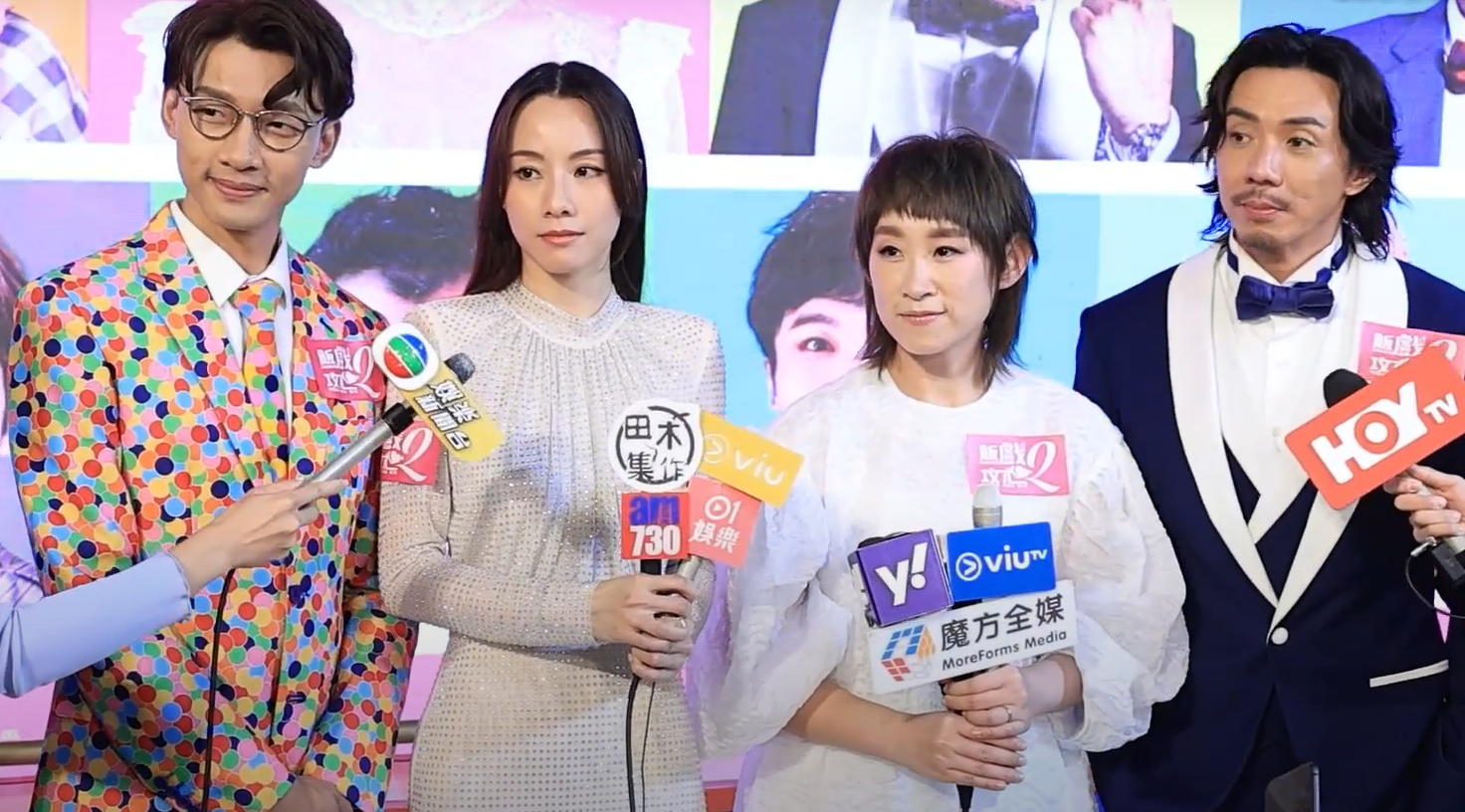
Peter Chan (left), Stephy Tang, Ivana Wong, and Louis Cheung at the press conference in November 2023

On 3 November, a press conference was held with Louis Cheung, Stephy Tang, Peter Chan, Ivana Wong, and Lin Min Chen in attendance, confirming their return to their roles, while Dayo Wong, the lead actor from the first film, was confirmed not to return for the sequel. Chan stated that Wong's absence was due to "personal reasons", which led to rewrites, as he had initially written the script with all six lead characters returning in the first two drafts. Chan considered abandoning the project after learning about Wong's unavailability but ultimately chose to proceed, recognizing the rarity of having a successful intellectual property in contemporary Hong Kong cinema and wanting to provide opportunities for the other five lead actors to advance their careers. Chan acknowledged that Wong's absence is a "significant shortcoming" since he is an essential character to the story, but he opted not to write the character out entirely, instead he allowed the other characters to mention him throughout the film, symbolizing their close family ties. The screenplay was finalized just two weeks before filming began because Chan was dissatisfied with Meow's (played by Lin Min Chen) character arc and wanted to provide her with a more profound ending. In an interview with Carol Cheng on her YouTube channel, Wong expressed that he was willing to return but was unable to, calling it "the most difficult decision in his entertainment career" and stating he would not reveal the reason leading to his decision for ten years. Wong's absence sparked criticism online, with film critic Calvin Choi noting that the missing lead actor in a Chinese New Year film is "not ideal", as New Year films stress the importance of good omens and the absence of a family member feels incomplete.

=== Filming and post-production ===
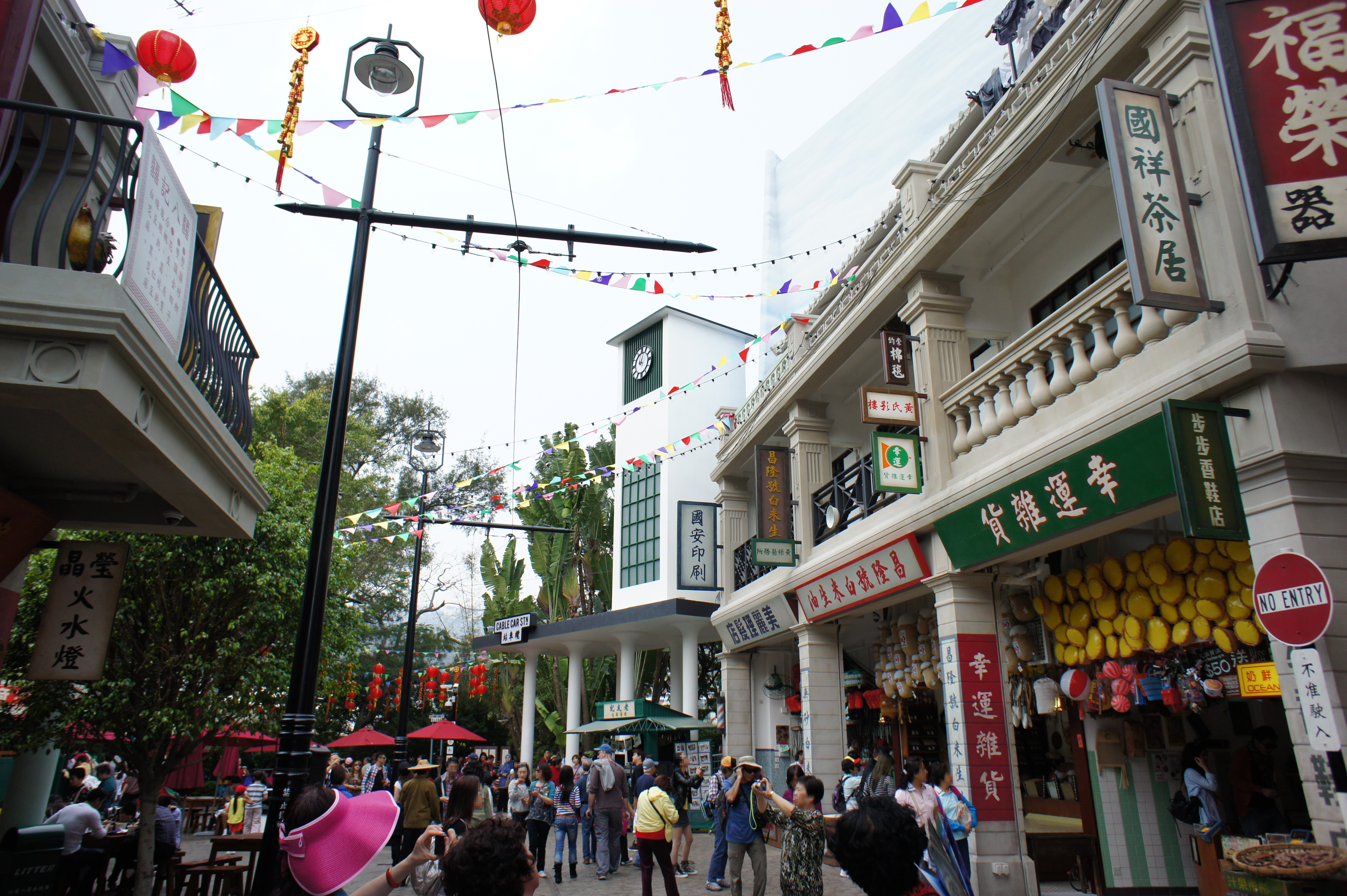
Bernard and Monica's wedding was shot at the Ocean Park's Old Hong Kong area.

Principal photography began in July 2023, with Irving Cheung returning as the production designer. Since Table for Six 2 was entirely structured around three wedding scenes, the crew decided to forgo the main set used in an industrial building in Ngau Tau Kok from the first film and scouted new locations to accommodate the wedding banquets. The entire filming was carried out in secret, with no public announcements made. Over a month was spent shooting at Ocean Park Hong Kong, with the crew only filming at night to avoid disrupting the park's daily operations. The scenes of Bernard and Monica's (played by Louis Cheung and Stephy Tang) wedding were primarily shot in the Old Hong Kong area and at Neptune's Restaurant. The other two wedding scenes were filmed at the West Kowloon Cultural District and WM Hotel in Sai Kung District respectively. HK01 reported that filming had been completed by the time the announcement of production was made on 6 October 2023. The rough cut of the film was around 3 hours long, and because Sunny Chan wanted to preserve all the scenes, only minimal editing was done to shorten each scene, resulting in a final runtime of 132 minutes. In December 2023, an official trailer was released, and distribution rights for the United Kingdom and Ireland were acquired by Trinity CineAsia in the following month.

=== Music ===
Table for Six 2 features a score by Alan Wong and Janet Yung. The film's theme song "I Love You So Much" was composed and performed by lead actress Ivana Wong, with lyrics written by director-screenwriter Sunny Chan. Wong, who also composed the theme song for Table for Six, described this new song as a "lyrical song" conveying a message of honesty in relationships, in contrast to the previous rock song. An official music video for the theme song was released on 31 January 2024. The film also revised "Table for Six", an interlude from the first installment, into a new piece titled "The Song of Feast", also composed by Day Tai with lyrics by Siu Hak. The film also includes Leslie Cheung's "Monica", Aling Choi's "Little Water, Long Flowing", and Ekin Cheng's "Together", with "Little Water, Long Flowing" being covered by Ivana Wong.

== Release ==
Table for Six 2 had its premiere at the Sha Tin Town Hall on 3 February 2024, followed by a theatrical release in Hong Kong on 9 February as a Chinese New Year film of the Year of Dragon. The film was also released in Malaysia and Taiwan on 10 February and 28 February 2024 respectively.

== Reception ==
=== Box office ===
Table for Six 2 grossed over HK$1.8 million on its opening day, surpassing the first film's HK$1.5 million opening gross, and climbed to HK$10 million by its third day of release. The film wrapped up the Lunar New Year period with HK$21.1 million, and raked in HK$25 million after its first week. It reached the HK$30 million mark on its ninth day, and accumulated approximately HK$31.9 million by the end of the second week, ranking first among all Chinese New Year films released in Hong Kong in 2024. The film ultimately concluded its theatrical run with HK$37 million, and combined with its gross in Macau, the total reached HK$39 million, making it the fourth highest-grossing 2024 Hong Kong film.

Internationally, the film grossed around RM$1 million after four days, and finished its theatrical run with about RM$1.6 million, with HK01 described the performance as "slightly lacking", attributing it to cultural differences.

=== Critical response ===
Edmund Lee of the South China Morning Post gave Table for Six 2 3.5/5 stars and considered it "a chaotic but satisfying follow-up" that lacked the "meticulous scripting of the original", relying heavily on Stephy Tang, who "reinvented herself to such a remarkable extent in such a short time that she is now effortlessly anchoring a festive ensemble comedy". Lee also ranked the film 13th out of the 36 Hong Kong films theatrically released in 2024. Keith Ho, writing for HK01, described the film as a "high-quality Chinese New Year film" that surpasses its predecessor with characters that are "distinctive and full of subtle contradictions", "driving the story's development and generating various layers of humor and climax".

Siu Yu of am730 compared the film with All's Well, Ends Well (1992) and appreciated Sunny Chan for "meticulously crafting every joke", and that she can see the director "pouring his heart and soul into this painstakingly created work". Nic Wong of Jet Magazine found the film to be a "festive" and "ambitious" sequel that, despite the absence of Dayo Wong, has "enough stars and humor to make viewers happy and start the new year with good spirits".

Phuong Le of The Guardian gave the film 3/5 stars and wrote that the film became "ill-equipped to explore in depth, zigzagging from one splashy wedding venue to another", and the new characters "[don't] really compensate for the void left behind by the lack of [Dayo] Wong's fabulous comedic timing". Gabriel Tsang, writing for The News Lens, offered a negative review and also found that the film's humor and pacing were "relatively weaker" compared to its predecessor, describing the films as "ambitious in terms of spectacle but lacking in emotional depth".
