= Peter Chan (actor) =

Hong Kong actor (born 1982)

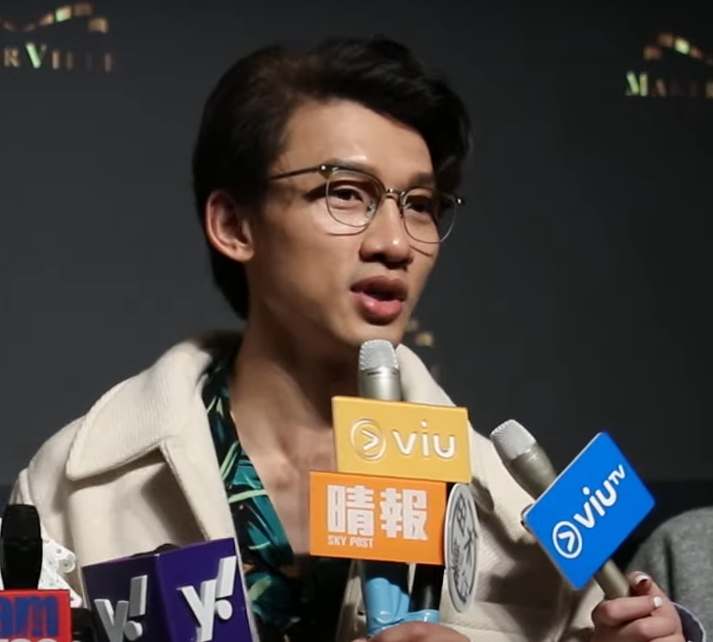
- Chan in March 2023
- Born: Chan Charm-man; 24 October 1982 (age 43) (Note: According to HK01, Chan had his birthday on 24 October 2022 and reached age 40.); Hong Kong
- Education: Hong Kong Academy for Performing Arts (BFA)
- Occupation: Actor
- Years active: 2018–present
- Spouse: Sung Man (m. 2019)
- Children: 1

Peter Chan Charm-man (Chinese: 陳湛文, born 24 October 1982) is a Hong Kong actor best known for his debut role in the drama film Three Husbands (2018), which earned him nominations for Best New Performer in the 38th Hong Kong Film Awards and Best Newcomer in the 13th Asian Film Awards. In 2023, he was nominated for Best Supporting Actor in the 41st Hong Kong Film Awards with his performance in the drama film Table for Six (2022).

== Biography ==
Chan was born on 24 October 1982. Chan worked as a clerk after graduating from secondary school. He discovered his passion in acting and left his job to attend Hong Kong Academy for Performing Arts at the age of 24. He graduated with a BFA in performing arts in 2012. Chan then featured in several stage plays and received numerous awards, including a Hong Kong Drama Award and a Hong Kong Theatre Libre.

In 2018, Chan made his feature film debut in the drama film Three Husbands. He was nominated for Best New Performer in the 38th Hong Kong Film Awards and Best Newcomer in the 13th Asian Film Awards with the role in the following year. However, Chan did not receive any roles during the COVID-19 pandemic and was forced to work as a part-time staff in an entertainment park to make a living. Chan ultimately returned to the film industry and landed his first major television role as Billy in ViuTV drama series In Geek We Trust in 2022. He also starred alongside Dayo Wong, Louis Cheung, Stephy Tang, Ivana Wong and Lin Min Chen in the film Table for Six, which earned him a nomination for Best Supporting Actor in the 41st Hong Kong Film Awards.

In 2023, Chan appeared in the miniseries Killing Procedures as a contract killer codenamed "J", which is his first role as the sole leading actor. Chan also appeared in Cheang Pou-soi's crime thriller Mad Fate as The Murderer, starring alongside Gordon Lam, Lokman Yeung and Berg Ng.

== Personal life ==
Chan married anchorwoman Sung Man in 2019. They gave birth to a daughter in 2021.

== Filmography ==
=== Film ===
Year	Title	Role	Notes/Ref.
2018	Three Husbands	Four Eyes (四眼)	
2022	Table for Six	Lung Chan (陳熹)	
2022	Tales from the Occult	Gat (吉仔)	
2022	Let It Ghost	Security Guard	
2023	Twelve Days	Simon's cousin	
2023	Mad Fate	The Murderer	
2023	Everyphone Everywhere	Raymond	
2023	In Broad Daylight	Shum (琛哥)	
2023	Time Still Turns the Pages	Piano teacher	
2024	Table for Six 2	Lung Chan	
2025	Hit N Fun	Daniel Wu	

=== Television ===
Year	Title	Role	Notes/Ref.
2022	In Geek We Trust	Billy	Main role
2022	#lovesignal	Daniel	Recurring role
2022	Into the Wild	Young Raymond	Recurring role
2023	Killing Procedures	J	Main role

== Awards and nominations ==
Year	Award	Category	Work	Result	Ref.
2017	26th Hong Kong Drama Awards	Best Supporting Actor	Brighton Beach Memories	Won	
2018	10th Hong Kong Theatre Libre	Best Lead Actor	Twists and Turns	Won	
2019	38th Hong Kong Film Awards	Best New Performer	Three Husbands	Nominated	
2019	13th Asian Film Awards	Best Newcomer	Three Husbands	Nominated	
2023	41st Hong Kong Film Awards	Best Supporting Actor	Table for Six	Nominated	
