= One Second Champion =

2021 Hong Kong film by Chiu Sin-hang

- Theatrical poster
- Traditional Chinese: 一秒拳王
- Jyutping: Jat^{1} Miu^{5} Kyun^{4} Wong^{4}
- Directed by: Chiu Sin-hang
- Written by: Ashley Cheung; Ho Siu-Hong; Lee Ho-Tin; Ling Wai-Chun
- Story by: Chiu Sin-hang
- Produced by: Mani Man
- Starring: Endy Chow; Chiu Sin-hang; Chanon Santinatornkul; Lin Min Chen
- Cinematography: Oliver Lau
- Edited by: Jack Tang
- Music by: Harry Ng
- Production companies: mm2 Entertainment; Medialink; Disney Networks Group Asia Pacific
- Distributed by: Universal Pictures
- Release dates: 22 November 2020 (HKAFF); 11 March 2021 (Hong Kong)
- Running time: 97 minutes
- Country: Hong Kong
- Language: Cantonese

One Second Champion (Chinese: 一秒拳王) is a 2020 Hong Kong sports film directed by Chiu Sin-hang, marking his second feature film project after Vampire Cleanup Department (2017). Chiu also takes on a lead role, alongside Endy Chow, Chanon Santinatornkul, and Lin Min Chen, portraying an asthmatic heir of a boxing gym who transforms a gambling addict with an ability to see one second into the future (played by Chow) into a professional boxer.

The film premiered as the closing film of 17th Hong Kong Asian Film Festival on 22 November 2020, and was theatrically released on 11 March 2021, in Hong Kong. It was named a Film of Merit in the 27th Hong Kong Film Critics Society Awards and received four nominations in the 40th Hong Kong Film Awards.

== Plot ==
Chow Tin Yan is a child prodigy with the ability to foresee one second into the future due to his one-second-long heartbeat pause at birth. He is coerced by his father into cheating in gambling. Unfortunately, his foresight is of no use at the gambling table as it only provides limited advantages, leading his father to consider him useless.

Years later, as a grown-up, Chow becomes addicted to gambling to raise money for his hearing-impaired son, Chi Leung's surgery. He works at a pub and faces debt collectors one day. To evade their attacks, Chow utilizes his foreseeing ability, deftly dodging their punches and causing them to stumble or hit each other. Witnessing Chow's talents, Yip Chi Shun, a boxer and heir to a struggling boxing gym, approaches Chow and recruits him as his sparring partner. With his pub job lost after the altercation with the debt collectors, Chow agrees to join Yip and begins training the next day. However, his laziness and quick exhaustion raise doubts in Yiu, Yip's cousin and yoga instructor at the gym, about Chow's usefulness to Yip's training. Nevertheless, Chow's dedication and energy increase when his son, Chi Leung, accompanies him to the gym.

Yip eventually enters an open championship but succumbs to asthma, forcing him to withdraw after only half a round. Dissatisfied with the lack of excitement from their gym's fighters, both the opponent and audience express their disappointment. Yip then asks Chow to replace him as the gym's representative, to which Chow reluctantly agrees. Despite being a novice with amateur moves, Chow's foreseeing ability helps him dodge most punches and deliver a powerful blow to his opponent, securing victory. Encouraged by his talent in boxing, Chow decides to become a boxer at Yip's gym, engaging in tough training. With his boxing skills improving significantly and his one-second foreseeing ability, he advances through the preliminaries until the finals, where he faces a formidable opponent, Sung Ngo Yeung. Despite Sung's aggressive attacks, Chow skillfully evades every move, including a surprise head punch. Suspicious of Chow's uncanny abilities, Sung investigates and discovers his one-second foreseeing power. He lodges a complaint with the boxing association, resulting in Chow's disqualification according to the association's guidelines on body standards.

Meanwhile, Joe, a champion boxer, finds himself without funding after unintentionally killing an opponent. Desperate for an exhibition match to attract new investments, Joe's coach approaches Chow, considering his foreseeing ability as a gimmick. However, Sung confronts Chow that night, accusing him of stealing the opportunity to fight Joe and winning matches solely based on his ability rather than hard work. During their argument, Chi Leung, frightened, rushes onto the road, and in an attempt to save him, Chow is struck by a van, losing his foreseeing ability in the accident. Sung apologizes to Chow, and with Chi Leung's encouragement, Chow resolves to continue fighting against Joe, pushing through grueling training.

However, Chow initially struggles to match Joe's skill and finds himself at a significant disadvantage in the first two rounds of the match against Joe. Joe grows contemptuous of Chow, perceiving him as too weak. Undeterred, Chow displays exceptional endurance and determination, repeatedly standing up despite Joe's relentless attacks. The two fighters last until the tenth round, both sustaining severe injuries. Chow's evolution throughout the match allows him to dodge Joe's final blows, almost as if he has regained his foreseeing ability, and persists until the match's final bell. As he teeters on the brink of collapse from his injuries, Joe rushes over to steady him, having earned Chow's respect through their bout. Although Chow ultimately loses the match in terms of score, he celebrates joyfully with his son and newfound friends.

== Cast ==
- Endy Chow as Chow Tin Yan, a gamble addict-turned-boxer who can see one second into the future
- Chanon Santinatornkul as Joe Cheng, a Thai boxing champion
- Chiu Sin-hang as Yip Chi Shun, a boxing fanatic and the heir of a boxing gym who has asthma
- Lin Min Chen as Yiu, the cousin of Yip and the potential love interest of Chow who teaches yoga at Yip's boxing gym
- Justin Cheung as Sung Ngo Yeung, a high-ranking boxer with the nickname "Iron Hammer"
- Hung Cheuk-lok as Chow Chi Leung, the hearing-impaired son of Chow

Actors credited as special appearances include Lo Hoi-pang as the barkeeper of the pub where Chow works; Ben Yuen as Master Cheung, the coach of Joe and a respected member of the boxing association; Wong You-nam as Chow Tin Yan's father; and Kaki Sham as a policeman. Babyjohn Choi made a cameo appearance as a janitor which resembles his character in another Chiu Sin-hang's film Vampire Cleanup Department (2017).

== Production ==
=== Development ===
Following the conclusion of filming Vampire Cleanup Department (2017), director Chiu Sin-hang was inspired by the soundtracks of Rocky and decided to write a heart-lifting story about boxing. This idea eventually evolved into One Second Champion prior to the 2019-20 Hong Kong protests. In 2019, Endy Chow was invited to join the project and accepted the role due to his desire to film a boxing movie. Lin Min Chen, the lead actress of Vampire Cleanup Department, was also invited by Chiu to star in the film, and she accepted the role on spot after reading the script. Both Chiu and Chow, the two lead actors, underwent six months of boxing training and followed a strict diet in preparation for filming. The film was officially announced in August 2019, and production took place during the protests. Chiu stated that the crew incorporated the emotions triggered by the social atmosphere into the film. In October 2019, Thai actor Chanon Santinatornkul was cast in the film, marking his first international action film project. He learned boxing and Cantonese specifically for the film. An official trailer was released in November 2020, revealing Lo Hoi-pang, Ben Yuen, Justin Cheung, and child actor Hung Cheuk-lok as part of the cast.

=== Filming ===
Principal photography began on 30 August 2019. The majority of the scenes were filmed in Tai Po, which included interior shots of Yip's boxing gym and the pub where Chow worked, as well as at the Yan Hing Street Refuse Collection Point. Scenes depicting Chow jogging and conversing with Yiu were shot at Ma Liu Shui and Sam Mun Tsai, respectively. While filming the final match between Chow and Santinatornkul, Chow sustained an injury to his forehead and required twelve stitches. However, he returned to the set without resting to ensure that the filming schedule would not be delayed. Filming ultimately wrapped on 30 September 2019.

== Release ==
One Second Champion premiered as the closing film of the 17th Hong Kong Asian Festival on 22 November 2020. Initially, the film was scheduled to have five days of early screenings from 28 November to 2 December 2020, followed by a theatrical release on 3 December in Hong Kong. However, due to the COVID-19 pandemic, the government shut down the cinemas on 2 December, leading to a postponement of the release date to 11 March 2021. The film was also selected for screening in the 23rd Far East Film Festival.

== Reception ==
=== Box office ===
One Second Champion grossed over HK$3 million in its first weekend and reached HK$7 million by the second week, maintaining its box office dominance for eight consecutive days. The film surpassed the 10 million mark within the third week, and ultimately accumulated a total of HK$15.56 million, surpassing Beyond the Dream (2019) as the highest-grossing domestic film during the COVID-19 pandemic. The film's box office run concluded at HK$17 million, making it the second highest-grossing domestic film of 2021.

=== Critical response ===
Edmund Lee of South China Morning Post gave the film 3/5 stars and recognized the delivery of an ultimate underdog story with a rousing climax in the final boxing match, particularly the energetic performances and standout moments from Chiu Sin-hang, Lin Min Chen, and Hung Cheuk-lok. Lee also ranked the film 14th out of the 32 Hong Kong films theatrically released in 2021. Kwok Kar Peng of AsiaOne praised the film for its polished execution, well-developed characters, captivating cinematography during boxing matches, and its uplifting theme of underdogs transforming their lives through determination and shifts in perspective, making it a feel-good flick that offered a hopeful message.

Yan Kei of Hong Kong Inmedia recommended the film for its engaging story, fast pacing, and Endy Chow's impressive performance, finding its enjoyment beyond "mere localness". Ho Siu-bun of am730 lauded the film with a decent level of quality, noting the director's improvement from his previous work, but also pointed out some shortcomings in the execution of comedy and the absence of dramatic elements.

== Awards and nominations ==
Year	Award	Category	Nominee	Result	Ref.
2021	27th Hong Kong Film Critics Society Award	Best Film	—N/a	Nominated	
2021	27th Hong Kong Film Critics Society Award	Best Screenplay	Ashley Cheung, Ho Siu-Hong, Lee Ho-Tin, Ling Wai-Chun	Nominated	
2021	27th Hong Kong Film Critics Society Award	Film of Merit	—N/a	Won	
2021	2020 Hong Kong Film Directors' Guild Awards	Best Actor	Endy Chow	Won	
2021	2020 Hong Kong Screenwriters' Guild Awards	Best Movie Character of the Year	Endy Chow	Won	
2021	2020 Hong Kong Screenwriters' Guild Awards	Best Screenplay	Ashley Cheung, Ho Siu-Hong, Lee Ho-Tin, Ling Wai-Chun	Won	
2022	40th Hong Kong Film Awards	Best Screenplay	Ashley Cheung, Ho Siu-Hong, Lee Ho-Tin, Ling Wai-Chun	Nominated	
2022	40th Hong Kong Film Awards	Best Action Choreography	Pokyan Leung	Nominated	
2022	40th Hong Kong Film Awards	Best Original Film Song	"Origin of Time"	Won	
2022	40th Hong Kong Film Awards	Best New Director	Chiu Sin-hang	Nominated	
