= Chiu Sin-hang =

Hong Kong singer, director and actor (born 1984)

- 趙善恆
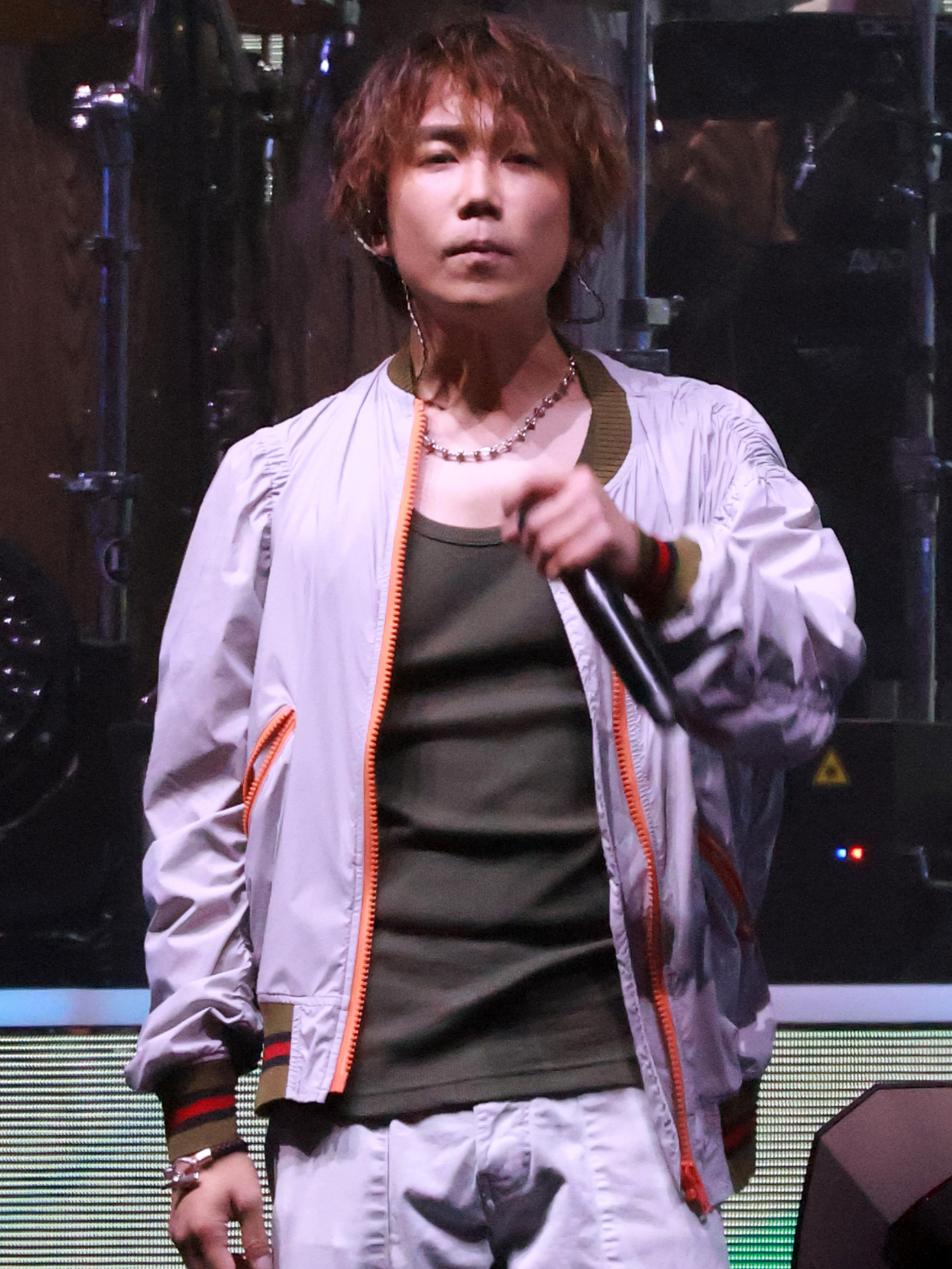
- Chiu in June 2023
- Born: Chiu Sin-hang; 11 March 1984 (age 42) (Note: According to AsOne Entertainment, Chiu had his birthday on 11 March 2024 and reached age 40.); Hong Kong
- Education: Hong Kong Academy for Performing Arts (BFA)
- Occupations: Singer; director; actor
- Years active: 2007–present

Chiu Sin-hang (Chinese: 趙善恆; born 11 March 1984) is a Hong Kong singer-songwriter, film director and actor. Debuting as the lead vocalist and guitarist of the rock band ToNick, Chiu gained public recognition with the band's first album Let's Go and their non-album single "Last Christmas" in 2010. He made his onscreen debut with a guest role in the HKTV drama series Second Life (2015), and ventured into film directing with the horror film Vampire Cleanup Department (2017).

Continuing his pursuits in both film and music, Chiu directed and starred in the sports film One Second Champion (2021), earning a nomination for Best New Director and winning Best Original Film Song as the singer and composer of the film's theme song in the 40th Hong Kong Film Awards. In 2023, Chiu made his television directorial debut and starred as the male lead in the ViuTV drama series Beyond the Common Ground.

== Early life and education ==
Chiu was born on 11 March 1984. He became interested in music and started learning guitar after watching Back to the Future. He attended the Hong Kong Polytechnic University and joined the music clubs and bands at the university. He also met his future bandmates Ryan Chan, Siugwai Wu, and Yip Sen Hei at PolyU. Chiu transferred to the School of Film and Television of the Hong Kong Academy of Performing Arts a year later and majored in sound system design. He also began directing short films in his freshman year at HKAPA and befriended Anthony Yan, his future frequent collaborator, while working on a project for a directorial course. Chiu graduated with a Bachelor of Fine Arts in 2007.

== Career ==
Chiu formed the rock band ToNick alongside his PolyU friends Chan, Su, and Yip after watching a concert by Mayday in the same year. He worked as a full-time screenwriter for several years before the band's official debut and the release of their first single "Mochi Ice Cream" in 2010. Chiu then spent most of his time composing and performing with the band and took on several part-time jobs, including teaching guitar, stage management, working at a cha chaan teng, and working for a renovation company to make a living. The band received public recognition after releasing their first album Let's Go and a non-album single "Last Christmas" on YouTube in 2010. Chiu, still intending to participate in film projects, also wrote several screenplays with Yan but failed to pitch them to distributors. However, he secured a guest role in the 2015 HKTV drama series Second Life as the younger version of Wilfred Lau's character. In 2016, Chiu became one of the co-hosts of the ViuTV music program Canton Lyrics Lovers.

In 2017, Chiu made his directorial debut alongside Anthony Yan with the horror romance film Vampire Cleanup Department. Although the film was not able to be released in China due to censorship, it was positively received in Hong Kong and grossed over HK$6 million at the local box office. "Stay Together", the theme song of the film which was composed and performed by ToNick, also went viral on the internet and won numerous music awards that year, including a nomination for Best Original Film Song in the 37th Hong Kong Film Awards. He also starred in the 2019 action thriller film The Fatal Raid and the 2021 romance film P.T.G.F..

In 2021, Chiu directed his second feature film One Second Champion and starred in a lead role as Yip Chi Shun, an heir to a boxing gym and a boxing fanatic, alongside Endy Chow and Lin Min Chen, the lead actress from Vampire Cleanup Department. He was nominated for Best New Director and won Best Original Film Song as the co-performer and composer of the film's theme song "Origin of Time" in the 40th Hong Kong Film Awards. In 2023, Chiu made his television directorial debut with the ViuTV drama series Beyond the Common Ground, while also taking on the lead role as Yip Chi Fan, a former barrister who became disillusioned with the corruption and manipulation of the law in the legal system, starring alongside Ivy So and Vincent Kok.

== Personal life ==
Chiu was in a relationship with singer Hana Tam for over ten years, and they had plans of getting married. However, they ultimately broke up in February 2023. After their breakup, Chiu was diagnosed with depression and struggled with it for a year.

== Filmography ==
=== Film ===
Year	Title	Director	Actor	Role	Notes/Ref.
2017	Vampire Cleanup Department	Yes	Yes	Driver	
2018	Keyboard Warriors	No	Yes	Gei Gei (紀基)	
2019	The Fatal Raid	No	Yes	Lee Chi Hang (李志恆)	
2021	P.T.G.F.	No	Yes	Wong Ka Chun (王家俊)	
2021	One Second Champion	Yes	Yes	Yip Chi Shun (葉志信)	
2023	Fate	No	Yes	Chung (聰仔)	

=== Television ===
Year	Title	Director	Actor	Role	Notes/Ref.
2015	Second Life	No	Yes	Young Cheung Yuk-jit (張旭哲)	Guest role
2018	Hong Kong West Side Stories	No	Yes	Ming (阿明)	Guest role
2020	Leap Day	No	Yes	Nick Tong	Cameo
2023	Beyond the Common Ground	Yes	Yes	Sheldon Yip Chi Fan (葉志凡)	Main role

== Awards and nominations ==
Year	Award	Category	Work	Result	Ref.
2022	40th Hong Kong Film Awards	Best New Director	One Second Champion	Nominated	
2022	40th Hong Kong Film Awards	Best Original Film Song	One Second Champion	Won	
