= Lin Min Chen =

Malaysian actress and singer (born 1990)

- 林明禎
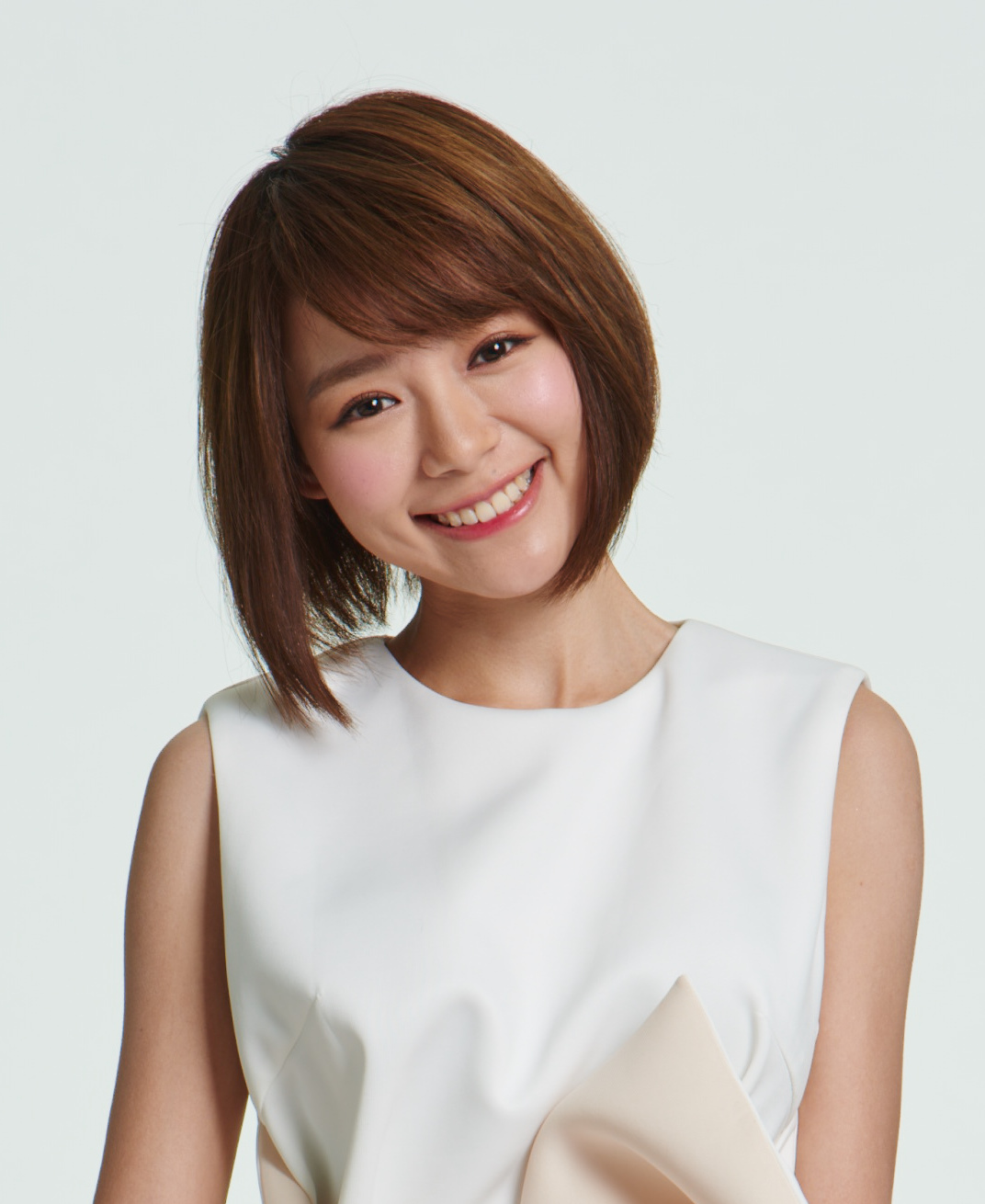
- Lin in December 2015
- Born: Lin Min Chen; 1 June 1990 (age 35) (Note: According to HK01, Lin had her birthday on 1 June 2023 and reached age 33.); Penang, Malaysia
- Occupations: Actress; Singer
- Years active: 2015–present

Lin Min Chen (Chinese: 林明禎; born 1 June 1990) is a Malaysian actress active in Malaysian, Taiwanese, and Hong Kong cinema. Debuting as a singer in Taiwan, Lin embarked on her acting career with the Taiwanese romance series Love Me and Prince of Wolf (both 2016). She gained recognition in Hong Kong with her role as Summer/Winter in the horror romance film Vampire Cleanup Department (2017) and has since appeared in various Hong Kong productions, including The Fatal Raid, A Journey of Happiness (both 2019), and One Second Champion (2021). Lin delivered a breakout performance as Meow in the comedy film Table for Six (2022), earning a nomination for Best Supporting Actress in the 41st Hong Kong Film Awards. She reprised the role in the sequel Table for Six 2 (2024).

== Early life ==
Lin was born on 1 June 1990, in Penang, Malaysia. She was of Chinese descent with ancestral roots from Chaozhou, Guangdong. Her mother was a lounge bar singer, and she had an elder sister and two younger brothers. When she was six years old, her family moved to Johor Bahru. After graduating from high school, Lin ran a beauty salon with her sister to raise money for her brothers' school fees. In her childhood, she never intended to join the entertainment industry; instead, she aspired to become a chef. She had plans to study culinary arts in Australia after saving enough money from the salon business.

== Career ==
In 2014, Lin gained popularity on the internet when a customer took a photo of her at the beauty salon. Several artist agencies, including singer Yu Heng's recently established studio, approached her. Yu Heng invited Lin to Taiwan to record a demo after recognizing her potential. In 2015, Lin signed with Seed Music as a singer and moved to Taipei to begin her career. She released her first single, "My Happy Adventure" in 2016, and subsequently starred in lead roles in the romance web series Love Me and Prince of Wolf. During the same year, the production crew of the horror romance film Vampire Cleanup Department directed by Chiu Sin-hang, went to Taiwan to audition for a suitable lead actress. Lin's agency recommended her for the audition, and she won the dual role of Summer/Winter, a vampire who died in the nineteenth century. Her performance in the film garnered public recognition in Hong Kong and marked the beginning of her career there. Lin filmed an advertisement for a Hong Kong fintech company in 2017, and released her second EP #Me in both Taiwan and Hong Kong. In 2019, she starred in the comedy action thriller film The Fatal Raid and the Hong Kong-Malaysian comedy film A Journey of Happiness, playing lead roles. She also released her third EP Whoo in the same year. In 2021, Lin appeared in Chiu Sin-hang's sports film One Second Champion as Yiu, a yoga teacher at a struggling boxing gym, and landed a recurring role in the Singaporean horror mystery thriller series The Ferryman·Legends of Nanyang.

In 2022, Lin achieved a breakout role in the Hong Kong comedy film Table for Six. She portrayed Meow, a Taiwanese media personality who moves to Hong Kong and stays with a family starring Dayo Wong, Stephy Tang, Louis Cheung, Ivana Wong, and Peter Chan. Her performance, along with her iconic greeting posture in the film, generated significant buzz on the internet, and she received a nomination for Best Supporting Actress in the 41st Hong Kong Film Awards. Lin reprised her role in the sequel Table for Six 2 in 2024, and her performance, particularly a crying monologue scene, received positive acclaim. She was also named the Youth Ambassador in the 16th Asian Film Awards.

In May 2024, Lin announced that she would be taking a hiatus from acting due to health conditions.

== Filmography ==
=== Film ===
Year	Title	Role	Notes
2017	Vampire Cleanup Department	Summer / Winter	
2019	The Fatal Raid	Zhi Hen (梓涵)	
2019	It's a Mad, Mad, Mad, Mad Show	Diva	
2019	A Journey of Happiness	Pumpkin BB	
2020	A Moment of Happiness	Zhen (真真)	
2021	One Second Champion	Yiu (小瑤)	
2022	Table for Six	Meow (阿Meow)	
2024	Table for Six 2	Meow (阿Meow)	
2024	We 12	Princess	

=== Television ===
Year	Title	Role	Notes
2016	Love Me	Lin Yi-jun (林怡君)	Main role
2016	Prince of Wolf	Chen Shu Pei (陳舒裴)	Main role
2021	The Ferryman·Legends of Nanyang	Qing Qing (青青)	Recurring role
2022	Coffee for the Soul	Yeung Sin Yu (楊善茹)	Special appearance

== Awards and nominations ==
Year	Award	Category	Work	Result	Ref.
2023	29th Hong Kong Film Critics Society Award	Best Actress	Table for Six	Nominated	
2023	41st Hong Kong Film Awards	Best Supporting Actress	Table for Six	Nominated	
