= Vampire Cleanup Department =

2017 Hong Kong film by Yan Pak-wing and Chiu Sin-hang

- Theatrical release poster
- Chinese: 救殭清道夫
- Directed by: Yan Pak-wing; Chiu Sin-hang
- Written by: Yan Pak-wing; Ho Wing-hong; Ashley Cheung
- Produced by: Ha Yue: Angus Chan
- Starring: Babyjohn Choi; Chin Siu-ho; Lin Min Chen; Richard Ng
- Cinematography: Choi Ko-bei
- Edited by: Tong Wai-wing
- Music by: Chiu Sin-hang; Marco Wan; Ho Kwan-wai
- Production companies: Media Asia Films; Entertaining Power; Samart Limited mm2 Studios Hong Kong
- Distributed by: Media Asia Distribution
- Release date: 16 March 2017
- Running time: 94 minutes
- Country: Hong Kong
- Language: Cantonese
- Box office: US$263,970

Vampire Cleanup Department (Chinese: 救僵清道夫) is a 2017 Hong Kong comedy horror film directed by Yan Pak-wing and Chiu Sin-hang.

The film is a memorial for Lam Ching-ying's death in 1997.

== Plot ==
=== Prologue ===
In 1840 in Oxtail Village-Hong Kong, a 20-year-old girl named Yik Siu-ha (aka Summer) was buried alive as an offering to her dead landlord. They both died from deep negative emotions and became jiangshi.

The existence of jiangshi, widely viewed as a myth by society, is taken seriously by the authorities. Formerly the responsibility of Maoshan Taoist priests, the jiangshi are now discreetly hunted and exorcised by the Vampire Cleanup Department (VCD). Established by the British Hong Kong government under the cover as the city's sanitation, the VCD are the first line of defense against vampire threats.

Yat Lung Cheung and his wife (both VCD agents) were bitten and infected by jiangshi. Cheung set himself on fire before turning. Before his pregnant wife's death, she gave birth to a baby boy.

=== Main Story ===
Twenty years later, Yat Lung's child Tim lives with his paternal grandmother who recycles cardboard for a living. One night, a vampire bites Tim before being neutralized by VCD agent Chau. After taking Tim home, Chung gives him an address, offering to explain everything.

The following day, Tim arrives at the sanitation building and learns of the agency. Because of their aging members, Chung proposes recruiting Tim. The other members were reluctant to accept due to their history with Yat Lung. Chung reveals Tim's parents' ties to the department and his father was their leader. As his mother was bitten during her pregnancy, Tim has a unique immunity against vampire toxins, making him an asset to the agency. After hesitating, Tim chooses to join.

Each agent starts training Tim in their area of expertise. Priest Ginger taught him anti-vampire amulet spells, Chau taught him martial arts, and Kui taught him how to use their anti-vampire weapons. Chau takes Tim to Sai Kung for a training mission. A treasure hunter had dived into the lake (that was once Oxtail Village) and found two caskets. He opened one and died from wrath of the undead landlord (aka Vampire King).

At the lake, Chung and Chau encounter Vampire King. After a fight, Chau uses his stakes to impale the Vampire King, who flees. Tim falls into the lake. Summer bites him and regains her human form. Chau arrests Summer and takes her back to VCD HQ. Along the way, the crew encounters Inspector Chu. Part of the HK police division that co-manages the vampire situation with the VCD, he doesn't like the VCD and has his own research team look into new ways in dealing with the vampire situation. Chu is interested in developing an anti-vampire vaccine that would cure vampirism and end the VCD's jurisdiction. Examining the scene, Chu's group discovers Summer's vampire tooth.

At VCD HQ, the crew learns about Oxtail Village and Summer's fate. They realize that Summer is the Vampire King's bride and their bond will lead to a disaster. Tim was instructed to burn Summer's body but the amulet restraining her comes off. Instead of fleeing, Summer follows Tim around. At his house, he keeps her occupied with Chinese Opera while he researches vampires. Tim learned the landlord is a Dry Vampire (a powerful and malevolent type) and Summer a Human Vampire (a vampire with human traits).

Viewing Summer as harmless, Tim decided to keep her around to learn more about vampires. Over time, Summer becomes more human and Tim learns more about her. The two slowly fall in love. As his grandmother grows weaker, to placate her fear of him being alone, Tim introduces Summer to her as his girlfriend. Elsewhere, the Vampire King, having recovered by feeding on rats, begins attacking civilians.

In a final test, Tim faces a live jiangshi. He overpowers it but hesitates to kill. Tim loses the and the jiangshi chokes him. Summer charges into the HQ to save Tim. Chau was angered to learn Tim disobeyed a direct order and kept Summer. Their argument was interrupted by news of the Vampire King. Summer was restrained and Tim begged Priest Ginger to not kill her. Tim tried to reason with Chau, who angrily destroys his sword, saying he was unworthy to wield it.

While Chau and Kui hunts for the Vampire King, Chu arrives with official order to disband the VCD. He takes over with his own squad, armed with the experimental anti-vampire vaccine. They take Summer to an empty mall to bait the Vampire King. Despite their dismissal, the remaining VCD members regroup at the mall.

The landlord arrived for Summer, and proves immune to Chu's developed vaccine, which is useless against the dry type. Chau, Kui, Ginger, and Tim step in to take on the Vampire King. Despite their best efforts, the vampire overwhelms them and bites Chau. The team manages to bind the Vampire King with rope and drags his body toward sunlight. Tim is tangled up along with thewas also stuck with the vampire as well. Summer broke free of her bindings and saved Tim from harm and helped burn the Vampire King to death. Sadly, Summer's actions cost her life. The sunlight was burning Summer away. Despite Tim encouraging Summer to drink his blood to save herself, she refused to. In their final moments, Summer smiled as she disintegrated and Tim tearfully kissed her, confessing his love for her.

In the aftermath, the VCD proved their effectiveness and not only reinstated, but was given a larger facility and even recruited a new team of VCD trainees. Chau survived his bite and was cured after doctors developed a vaccine from Tim's immunity. It was while talking to the new trainees that Tim happily encountered Winter, a trainee that looks just like Summer. The story ends with Tim preparing for a new mission.

== Cast ==
- Babyjohn Choi as Tim Cheung, an intern vampire sweeper whose blood is resistant to the infection from vampires. His parents were both in the department, but were unfortunately bitten by a vampire during a mission. Tim's mother was giving birth to Tim, which resulted in him being neither human nor vampire. Tim then falls in love with a female vampire called Summer (Yik Siu-ha).
- Lin Min Chen as Summer/Winter, originally named Yik Siu-ha, born in 1820, died in 1840. She was buried as funeral objects to the landlord. She woke up as a female vampire with the landlord vampire. Winter is a trainee vampire sweeper who looks exactly like Summer and is implied to be her reincarnation.
- Chin Siu-ho as Yip Chi Chau, Tim's master, teaching him how to fight against vampires. The fighter of the department.
- Richard Ng as "Uncle" Yeung Chung, director of the department, in charging technical support.
- Lo Mang as Tai Gau Kui, in charge of producing weapons and supplies or cleaning up.
- Bondy Chiu as M
- Yuen Cheung-yan as Master Ginger
- Siu Yam-yam as Tim's Grandma
- Jiro Lee as Inspector Chu
- Tat Chi Yu as Security Guard
- Jim Chim Sui-man as Congee Restaurant Owner
- Eric Tsang as Policeman

== Reception ==
The Hollywood Reporter stated that the film was "enjoyable in a throwaway kind of way, and it’s forgotten as soon as the credits roll" and that the film finding that it "shamelessly trades in nostalgia for both the singularly Chinese creature and the goofy horror comedies Hong Kong pumped out in the 1980s and early ’90s." Edmund Lee of the South China Morning Post compared the film to Juno Mak's Rigor Mortis and the Wong Jing production Sifu vs Vampire that "we finally have an adequate homage to the comedic tradition immortalised by Mr Vampire (1985) and its sequels." The review gave the film a three out of five rating, concluding it as a "frothy yet genuinely likeable film"

== Awards and nominations ==
Awards	Category	Nominee	Results	Ref.
37th Hong Kong Film Awards	Best Supporting Actress	Siu Yam-yam	Nominated	
37th Hong Kong Film Awards	Best Original Film Song	"Jeung Seung Si Sau"	Nominated	
