= Detective vs Sleuths =

2022 Hong Kong film by Wai Ka-fai

- Theatrical release poster
- Traditional Chinese: 神探大戰
- Simplified Chinese: 神探大战
- Directed by: Wai Ka-fai
- Screenplay by: Wai Ka-fai; Ryker Chan; Mak Tin-shu
- Story by: Wai Ka-fai; Mak Tin-shu
- Produced by: Wai Ka-fai; Jason Siu; Elaine Chu
- Starring: Sean Lau; Charlene Choi; Raymond Lam; Carman Lee
- Cinematography: Cheng Siu-keung
- Edited by: David Richardson; Allen Leung
- Music by: Chung Chu-wing; Ben Cheung
- Production companies: Emperor Motion Pictures; Miracle Age Pictures; Super Lion Pictures
- Distributed by: Emperor Motion Pictures
- Release dates: 8 July 2022 (China); 21 July 2022 (Hong Kong)
- Running time: 102 minutes
- Country: Hong Kong
- Language: Cantonese
- Box office: US$107.4 million (Note: See Box office)

Detective vs Sleuths is a 2022 Hong Kong action thriller film directed, co-written and co-produced by Wai Ka-fai, starring Sean Lau, Charlene Choi, Raymond Lam and Carman Lee. The film follows former police officer Lee Jun (Lau) and elite police inspector Chan Yee (Choi) as they investigate a series of murders that appear to be connected to previous cases they investigated. They find themselves in a race against time to uncover the mastermind behind these murders.

Announced in 2018, Detective vs Sleuths was Wai's first film since 2009's Written By. It also marked a reunion between Wai and his frequent collaborator Sean Lau. Filming took place in Hong Kong and Guangzhou from 21 August 2018 to 17 December 2018, and the film began the post-production process in April 2019.

Detective vs Sleuths was released in Hong Kong on 21 July 2022, after a period of postponement due to the COVID-19 pandemic. The film received critical acclaim, winning 4 out of 11 categories at the 41st Hong Kong Film Awards, including Best Director for Wai Ka-fai, Best Screenplay, Best Actor for Sean Lau and Best Cinematography. It was also nominated for Best Film.

== Synopsis ==
Lee Jun is a former police chief inspector and elite detective in the Hong Kong Police Force (OCTB) who has been expelled from the police force following a mental breakdown due to wrongful convictions in two murder cases.

Years later, a series of high-profile murders have been committed by a group of culprits calling themselves the "Sleuths." At the crime scenes, the perpetrators leave behind police case file numbers of previous murder cases. The Sleuths believe that they are killing the real murderers who were not brought to justice.

Lee hallucinates that he is talking to victims and future victims of the Sleuth, leading him to deduce the victims and locations of the Sleuths' upcoming murders. This leads the OCTB to suspect that Lee is a member of the Sleuths. Chan Yee, a senior inspector of the OCTB who is also the only survivor of a murder case that occurred 17 years ago, requests Lee's help. During their investigation, Lee and Chan uncover secrets regarding past murder cases.

== Cast ==
- Sean Lau as Jun Lee, a former police chief inspector and detective in the OCTB who was expelled after experiencing hallucinations. He quotes Nietzsche: "Whoever battles monsters should see to it that in the process he does not become a monster himself."
- Charlene Choi as Yee Chan, a senior inspector who is also the only survivor in the Butcher case and later got promoted to chief inspector of the OCTB.
- Raymond Lam as Fong Lai-shun, a chief inspector in OCTB.
- Carman Lee as Yan Wong, Jun Lee's old colleague, chief superintendent of the OCTB, the superior of Yee Chan, Fong Lai-shun and Au Yeung Kim.
- Tan Kai as Au Yeung Kim, a superintendent of the OCTB.
- Carlos Chan as Tsai Ka-chu, an OCTB senior inspector. Chun Chi-to's son and Yeung Lai's boyfriend.
- Kathy Yuen as Yeung Lai, an OCTB senior inspector. Keung's daughter and Tsai Ka-chu's girlfriend.
- Jeana Ho as Lynn Cheung, Jun Lee's rebellious daughter.
- Deep Ng as Chun Chi-to, a deceased victim from the Devil Cop Case.
- Timmy Hung as Keung, a deceased victim from the Butcher Case.
- Stephanie Che as Fishmonger, one of the murderers in the Corpse Cooking Case.

== Release ==
Detective vs Sleuths was originally planned for release in December 2019 but was postponed. Production company Emperor Motion Pictures did not gave any reasons for the delay.

== Reception ==
=== Box office ===
Detective vs Sleuths grossed a total of US$107.4 million worldwide, combining its box office gross from Hong Kong (US$1,906,153), and China (US$105.5 million).

In Hong Kong, the film grossed HK$5,224,908 (US$645,603) during its first four days of release, debuting at No. 2 behind Chilli Laugh Story. The film remained at No. 2 in its second weekend, grossing HK$5,318,944 and accumulating a total gross of HK$10,543,852 (US$1,343,166) by then. During its third weekend, the film grossed HK$2,999,499, moving down to No. 4, and have grossed a total of HK$13,543,351 (US$1,725,290) by then. On its fourth weekend, the film grossed HK$1,396,127, coming in at No. 7, accumulating a total gross of HK$14,939,478 (US$1,906,153) so far. Announced on August 15, 2022, the box office exceeded HK$15,000,000.

=== Critical reception ===
Edmund Lee of South China Morning Post gave the film three stars out of five, writing, "its relentless parade of shoot-outs and explosions also make this quite an exhausting watch".

== Awards and nominations ==
Ceremony	Category	Recipient	Results
41st Hong Kong Film Awards	Best Film	Detective vs Sleuths	Nominated
41st Hong Kong Film Awards	Best Director	Wai Ka-fai	Won
41st Hong Kong Film Awards	Best Screenplay	Wai Ka-fai, Ryker Chan, Mak Tin Shu	Won
41st Hong Kong Film Awards	Best Actor	Sean Lau	Won
41st Hong Kong Film Awards	Best Cinematography	Cheng Siu-keung	Won
41st Hong Kong Film Awards	Best Film Editing	David Richardson, Allen Leung	Nominated
41st Hong Kong Film Awards	Best Art Direction	Jean Tsoi	Nominated
41st Hong Kong Film Awards	Best Costume & Make Up Design	Stanley Cheung, Pat Tang	Nominated
41st Hong Kong Film Awards	Best Action Choreography	Jack Wong Wai-leung	Nominated
41st Hong Kong Film Awards	Best Visual Effects	Don Ma, Chan Wah, Spectra Wong, Jacky Chung	Nominated
41st Hong Kong Film Awards	Best Sound Design	Thomas Cheng, Vincent Tam, Chill Yang	Nominated
