= A Journey of Happiness =

2019 Cantonese-language comedy film

- Film poster
- Directed by: JY Teng
- Written by: Ryon Lee
- Produced by: Sunstrong Entertainment, Lomo Pictures
- Starring: Joyce Cheng; Lo Hoi-pang; Alex Lam; Jerry Lamb; Ah Niu; Lin Min Chen
- Distributed by: MM2 Entertainment Sdn. Bhd.
- Release dates: 5 February 2019 (Malaysia); 21 February 2019 (Hong Kong)
- Running time: 92 minutes
- Countries: Malaysia, Hong Kong
- Language: Cantonese
- Box office: RM 3.5 million

A Journey of Happiness (Chinese: 玩轉全家福) is a 2019 Malaysian-Hong Kong Cantonese-language comedy film that was produced by Sunstrong Entertainment & Lomo Pictures. The films tells the journey of a dysfunctional Hong Kong family of four who self-travels in Malaysia for vacation.

It is released on 5 February 2019 in Malaysia and Hong Kong, and its Mandarin dubbed version was released on 31 January in Singapore.

== Synopsis ==
The Siew family consists of father Siew Fatt (Lo Hoi-pang), who is depressed after his wife died, eldest son Siew Beng (Jerry Lamb), a property agent; only daughter Siew Shen (Joyce Cheng), a loud optimistic tour guide; and youngest son Siew Lup (Alex Lam), a social media influencer wannabe. Siew Shen decides to takes her family on a trip to Malaysia, hoping to fix the family's strained relationship. Along the journey, they encounter many people, endless catastrophes and fun surprises. How will their journey end?

== Cast ==
- Joyce Cheng as Siew Shen, daughter
- Lo Hoi-pang as Siew Fatt, father
- Alex Lam as Siew Lup, younger son
- Jerry Lamb as Siew Beng, elder son
- Ah Niu as Cui Fong
- Lin Min Chen as Pumpkin BB
- Siu Yam-yam as Orchid
- Cheng Kam Cheong
- Mimi Chu
- Hay Wong
- Miss Hunny/Hunny Ho
