= Sunny Chan (filmmaker) =

Hong Kong filmmaker (born 1976/1977)

- 陳詠燊
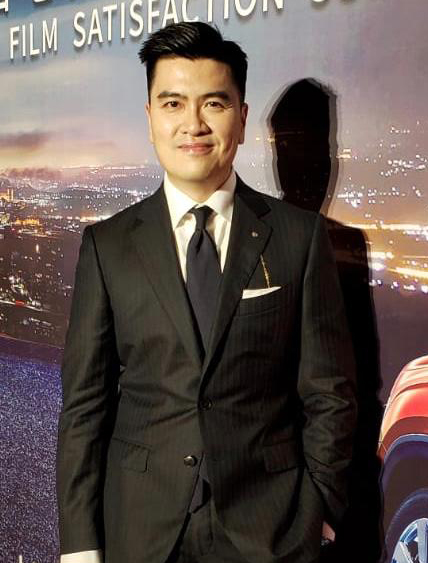
- Chan in June 2019
- Born: Chan Wing-san; 1976 or 1977 (age 48–49); Hong Kong
- Education: Hong Kong Academy for Performing Arts (BFA); Lingnan University (MA)
- Occupations: Director; screenwriter
- Years active: 2000–present

Sunny Chan Wing-san (Chinese: 陳詠燊; born 1976/1977) is a Hong Kong director and screenwriter best known for co-writing comedy film Love Undercover (2002) with Joe Ma, and directing drama films Men On The Dragon (2018) and Table for Six (2022), which earned him nominations for Best Director twice in the 38th and 41st Hong Kong Film Awards respectively.

== Biography ==
Chan was born in 1976 or 1977. He became interested in storytelling after reading the novels of Hong Kong fantasy writer Christopher Woo. He later attended the Hong Kong Academy for Performing Arts in 1997 and graduated with a Bachelor of Fine Arts in film and television in 2000. He began to write commercial screenplays after graduation and co-wrote romance film Funeral March with filmmaker Joe Ma in 2001. They received a nomination for Best Screenplay in the 7th Golden Bauhinia Awards. Chan then became an apprentice of Ma and the duo co-wrote more than ten films together, including the 2002 comedy film Love Undercover. In 2006, Ma decided to pursue a career in mainland China, while Chan, who had just gotten married and preferred a more stable life, chose not to join him. However, Chan did not receive any scriptwriting offers after Ma's departure. After being unemployed for two years, he found a job at Hong Kong Jockey Club and taught screenwriting part-time at Hong Kong Design Institute. He also acquired a Master of Arts in Chinese from Lingnan University.

In 2018, Chan was invited to join the production of fantasy comedy film Monster Hunt 2 by his APA classmate Jack Ng, as Ng found himself rather inexperienced in comedy writing, while Chan was well-versed in the field. Chan also made his directorial debut with drama film Men On The Dragon in the same year, and received nominations for Best Director, Best Screenplay and Best New Director in the 38th Hong Kong Film Awards. In 2022, Chan directed and wrote comedy film Table for Six. The film received widespread acclaim and became the third highest-grossing domestic film of all time in Hong Kong. Chan also received nominations for Best Director, Best Screenplay, Best New Director and Best Original Film Song (as lyricist) in the 41st Hong Kong Film Awards. Table for Six 2, a sequel also directed and wrote by Chan, was released in 2024.

== Filmography ==
=== Film ===
Year	Title	Writer	Director	Notes
2001	Funeral March	Yes	No	
2001	Dummy Mommy, without a Baby	Yes	No	
2001	Horror Hotline... Big Head Monster	Yes	No	
2001	Feel 100% II	Yes	No	
2002	The Lion Roars	Yes	No	
2002	Summer Breeze of Love	Yes	No	
2002	Love Undercover	Yes	No	
2003	Sound of Colors	Yes	No	
2003	Love Undercover 2	Yes	No	
2003	Diva... Ah Hey	Yes	No	
2004	Three of a Kind	Yes	No	
2006	Love Undercover 3	Yes	No	
2018	Monster Hunt 2	Yes	No	
2018	Men On The Dragon	Yes	Yes	
2018	Napping Kid	Yes	No	
2022	Table for Six	Yes	Yes	
2024	Table for Six 2	Yes	Yes	

== Awards and nominations ==
Year	Award	Category	Work	Result	Ref.
2001	7th Golden Bauhinia Awards	Best Screenplay	Funeral March	Nominated	
2019	38th Hong Kong Film Awards	Best Director	Men On The Dragon	Nominated	
2019	38th Hong Kong Film Awards	Best Screenplay	Men On The Dragon	Nominated	
2019	38th Hong Kong Film Awards	Best New Director	Men On The Dragon	Nominated	
2023	29th Hong Kong Film Critics Society Award	Best Director	Table for Six	Nominated	
2023	29th Hong Kong Film Critics Society Award	Best Screenplay	Table for Six	Nominated	
2023	41st Hong Kong Film Awards	Best Director	Table for Six	Nominated	
2023	41st Hong Kong Film Awards	Best Screenplay	Table for Six	Nominated	
2023	41st Hong Kong Film Awards	Best New Director	Table for Six	Nominated	
2023	41st Hong Kong Film Awards	Best Original Film Song	Table for Six	Nominated	
