= Peter Lai (lyricist) =

Hong Kong lyricist and actor (1950–2026)

Peter Lai (Chinese: 黎彼得; 13 May 1950 – 5 August 2026) was a Hong Kong lyricist and actor. He was nicknamed "The Lyrical Maverick", having written more than 200 Cantopop songs.

In the 1970s and 1980s, he co-wrote many lyrics of the first Cantopop songs with Sam Hui. He also wrote songs for Anita Mui, Leslie Cheung and Alan Tam among other Hong Kong pop stars. Lai, along with Jim Wong, Jimmy Lo and Cheng Kwok Kong, are the pioneer generation of Cantopop lyricists in Hong Kong.

Lai also worked as a screenwriter and film producer for Golden Harvest and TVB. Starting in the 1980s, he has acted in movies and TV series.

He portrayed a private tutor in the 1993 film, Flirting Scholar.

Lai died from complications of a stroke in Hong Kong, on 5 August 2026, at the age of 76.
