= Endy Chow =

Hong Kong actor, singer and songwriter

- 周國賢
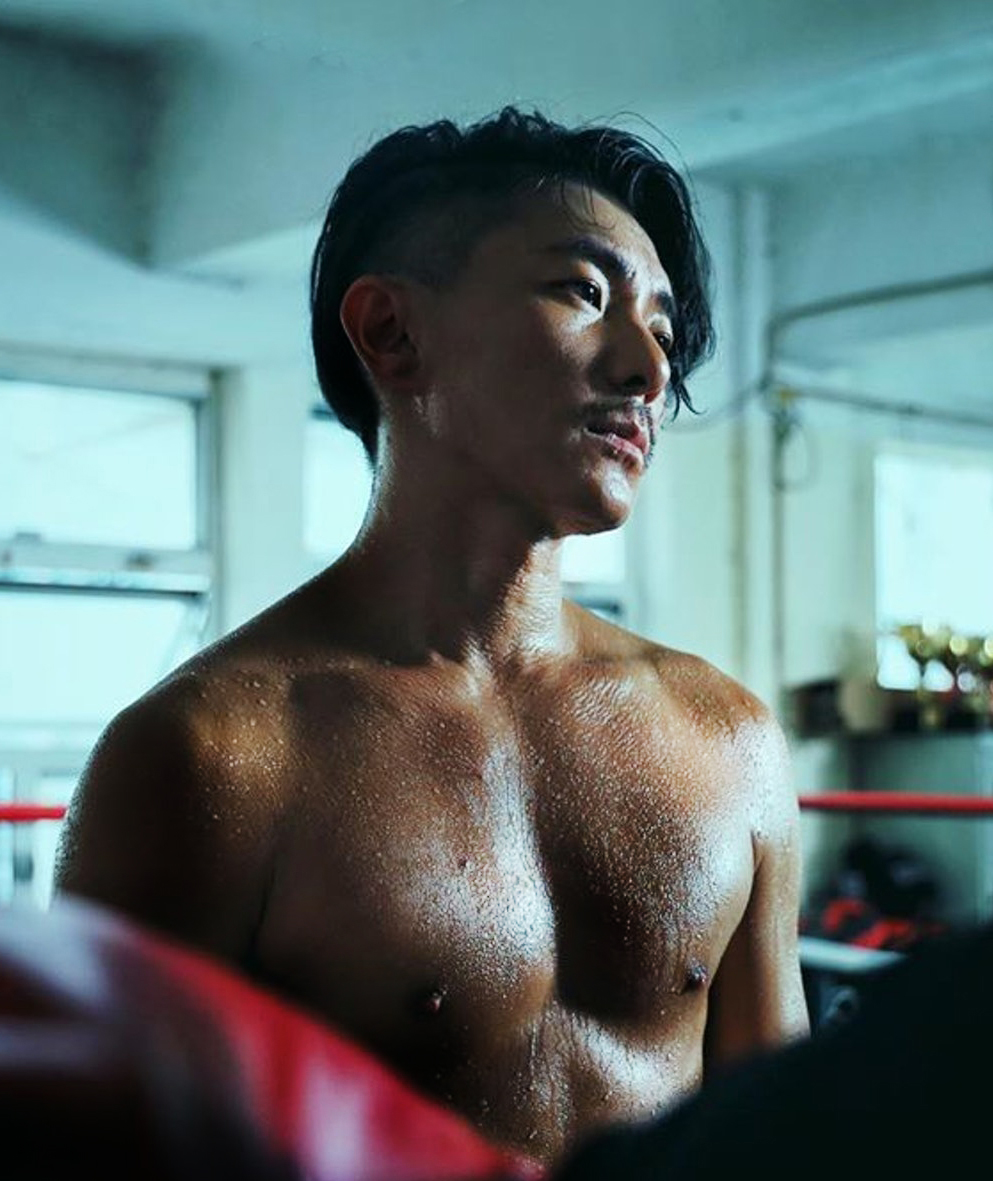
- Chow in 2021
- Born: Chow Kwok-yin
- Occupations: Actor, singer, songwriter
- Spouse: Lee Mi-young (m. 2002; div. 2021)
- Children: 3

Chinese name
- Traditional Chinese: 周國賢
- Simplified Chinese: 周国贤
Transcriptions
Standard Mandarin
- Hanyu Pinyin: zhou1 guo2 xian2
Yue: Cantonese
- Jyutping: zau1 gwok3 yin4
- Musical career
- Origin: Hong Kong
- Genres: Cantopop, Rock
- Instruments: Vocals, guitar, cello, piano
- Labels: WOW Music (2015-present)
- Website: facebook.com/endychowjaugwokyin

Endy Chow Kwok-yin is a Hong Kong actor, singer and songwriter.

== Career ==
In mid-2009, before his contract with Warner Music ended, he released a compilation album, "College", and completely withdrew from the music scene. However, in mid-2010, she announced his signing with BMA, marking his return to the music industry. Over two years, he achieved remarkable success at various music award ceremonies and simultaneously founded the production company Vague Eyes (Vague Eyes Art Studio). In mid-2013, due to emotional distress, he withdrew from the music scene again.

== Personal life ==
In 2001, Chow married a Korean woman he met while studying in Japan. With his wife, Chow has three daughters named Clara, Rachael and Elisia. The couple ended their marriage in 2021.

== Filmography ==
=== Film ===
- The Invincible Dragon (2019)
- One Second Champion (2021)
- The Sunny Side of the Street (2022)

=== MV Appearance (Actor) ===
- AGA - "理性與任性之間" (2021)
- Lolly Talk - "My Seven Stars" (2023)
