= Hong Kong Film Award for Best New Director =

Hong Kong film award

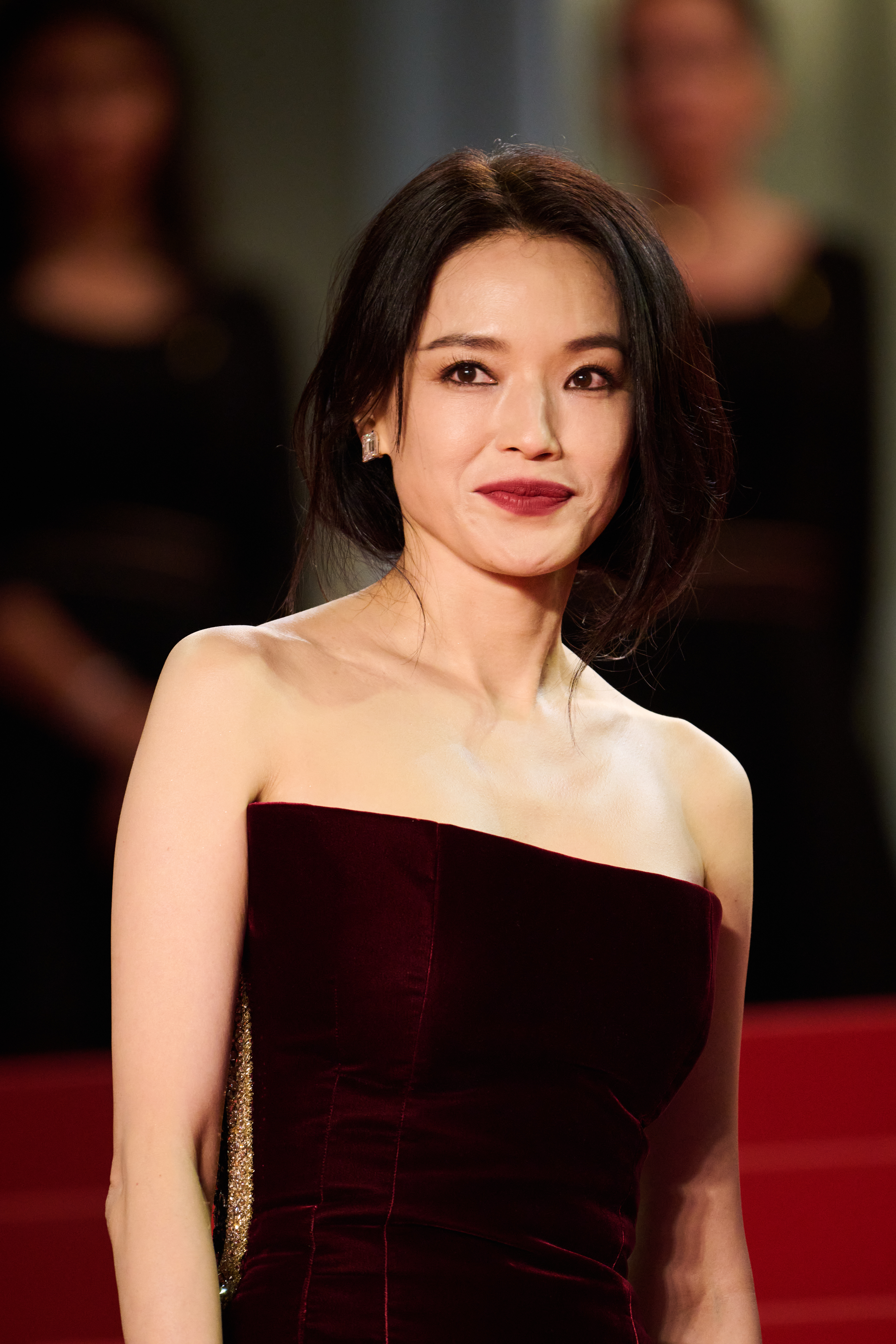
- The 2026 recipient: Shu Qi
- Awarded for: Best Achievement in Direction in a First or Second Feature Film
- Country: Hong Kong
- Presented by: Hong Kong Film Awards Association
- First award: 2002
- Currently held by: Shu Qi for Girl (2026)
- Website: hkfaa.com

The Hong Kong Film Award for Best New Director (Chinese: 香港電影金像獎新晉導演) is an annual Hong Kong industry award presented to a director for a debut or sophomore feature film.

== History ==
In 2002, the new category of Outstanding Young Director was introduced to recognize up-and-coming directors, with the inaugural award presented to Stephen Chow for his 2001 film Shaolin Soccer. Two years later, at the 23rd Hong Kong Film Awards, the category was renamed Best New Director and has been awarded annually ever since.

== Winners and nominees ==
indicates the winner

Year	Director(s)	Film	Ref.
2002 (21st)	Stephen Chow	Shaolin Soccer	
2003 (22nd)	Law Chi-Leung	Inter Sense	
2004 (23rd)	Pang Ho Cheung	Men Suddenly In Black	
2004 (23rd)	Wong Chun Chun	Truth Or Dare : 6th Floor Rear Flat	
2004 (23rd)	Carol Lai	The Floating Landscape	
2005 (24th)	Wong Ching Po	Jiang Hu	
2005 (24th)	Barbara Wong Chun Chun	Six Strong Guys	
2005 (24th)	Toe Yuen	Mcdull, Prince De La Bun	
2006 (25th)	Kenneth Bi	Rice Rhapsody	
2006 (25th)	Mathew Tang Hon Keung	Before Twenty…. Before Too Old….	
2006 (25th)	Derek Yee Tung Sing Chun Tin Nam	2 Young	
2006 (25th)	Stephen Fung	House Of Fury	
2007 (26th)	Daniel Wu	The Heavenly Kings	
2007 (26th)	Law Wing Cheong	2 Become 1	
2007 (26th)	Patrick Kong	Marriage With A Fool	
2008 (27th)	Yau Nai Hoi	Eye In The Sky	
2008 (27th)	Derek Kwok	The Pye-Dog	
2008 (27th)	Adam Wong	Magic Boy	
2009 (28th)	Derek Kwok	The Moss	
2009 (28th)	Heiward Mak	High Noon	
2009 (28th)	Ivy Ho	Claustrophobia	
2010 (29th)	Cheung King Wai	KJ	
2010 (29th)	Philip Yung	Glamorous Youth	
2010 (29th)	Roy Chow Hin Yeung	Murderer	
2011 (30th)	Felix Chong Man Keung	Once A Gangster	
2011 (30th)	Ivy Ho	Crossing Hennessy	
2011 (30th)	Freddie Wong Kwok Shiu	The Drunkard	
2012 (31st)	Tsang Tsui Shan	The Big Blue Lake	
2012 (31st)	Calvin Poon Yuen Leung	Hi, Fidelity	
2012 (31st)	Bill Yip Kim Fung	Cure	
2013 (32nd)	Chow Hin Yeung	Nightfall	
2013 (32nd)	Brian Tse	The Pork of Music	
2013 (32nd)	Fung Chih Chiang	The Bounty	
2014 (33rd)	Adam Wong	The Way We Dance	
2014 (33rd)	Alan Yuen	Firestorm	
2014 (33rd)	Juno Mak	Rigor Mortis	
2015 (34th)	David Lee Kwong Yiu	Insanity	
2015 (34th)	Ruby Yang	My Voice, My Life	
2015 (34th)	Amos WHY	Dot 2 Dot	
2016 (35th)	Raman Hui	Monster Hunt	
2016 (35th)	Nick Cheung Ka Fai	Keeper Of Darkness	
2016 (35th)	Lau Ho Leung	Two Thumbs Up	
2017 (36th)	Wong Chun	Mad World	
2017 (36th)	Derek Tsang	Soul Mate	
2017 (36th)	Jazz Boon	Line Walker	
2017 (36th)	Andy Lo	Happiness	
2017 (36th)	Stevefat	Weeds on Fire	
2018 (37th)	Kearen Pang	29+1	
2018 (37th)	Jonathan Li	The Brink	
2018 (37th)	Chapman To	The Empty Hands	
2018 (37th)	Derek Hui	This Is Not What I Expected	
2018 (37th)	Chan Tai Lee	Tomorrow is Another Day	
2019 (38th)	Oliver Chan	Still Human	
2019 (38th)	Lee Cheuk Pan	G Affairs	
2019 (38th)	Sunny Chan	Men On The Dragon	
2019 (38th)	Jeff Cheung	Agent Mr Chan	
2019 (38th)	Jun Li	Tracey	
2020 (39th)	Norris Wong	My Prince Edward	
2020 (39th)	Jazz Boon	Line Walker 2: Invisible Spy	
2020 (39th)	Wong Hing Fan	I’m Livin’ It	
2020 (39th)	Nick Leung Kwok-Pun	Lion Rock	
2020 (39th)	Cheuk Cheung	Bamboo Theatre	
2022 (40th)	Chan Kin-long	Hand Rolled Cigarette	
2022 (40th)	Chiu Sin-hang	One Second Champion	
2022 (40th)	Man Lim Chung	Keep Rolling	
2022 (40th)	Lau Ho Leung	Caught in Time	
2022 (40th)	Jun Li	Drifting	
2024 (42nd)	Nick Cheuk	Time Still Turns the Pages	
2024 (42nd)	Lawrence Kan	In Broad Daylight	
2024 (42nd)	Sasha Chuk	Fly Me to the Moon	
2024 (42nd)	Jack Ng	A Guilty Conscience	
2024 (42nd)	Jonathan Li	Dust to Dust	
2025 (43rd)	Robin Lee	Four Trails	
2025 (43rd)	Jill Lai Yin Leung	Last Song for You	
2025 (43rd)	Ho Miu Ki	Love Lies	
2025 (43rd)	Albert Leung, Herbert Leung	Stuntman	
2025 (43rd)	Thomas Lee, Daniel Ho	An Abandoned	
2026 (44th)	Shu Qi	Girl	
2026 (44th)	Tommy Ng	Another World	
2026 (44th)	Kung Siu-ping	Measure in Love	
2026 (44th)	Kwok Ka-hei, Jack Lee	Unidentified Murder	
2026 (44th)	Juno Mak	Sons of the Neon Night	

== See also ==
- Asian Film Award for Best New Director
- Golden Horse Award for Best New Director
