= Ivana Wong =

- 王菀之
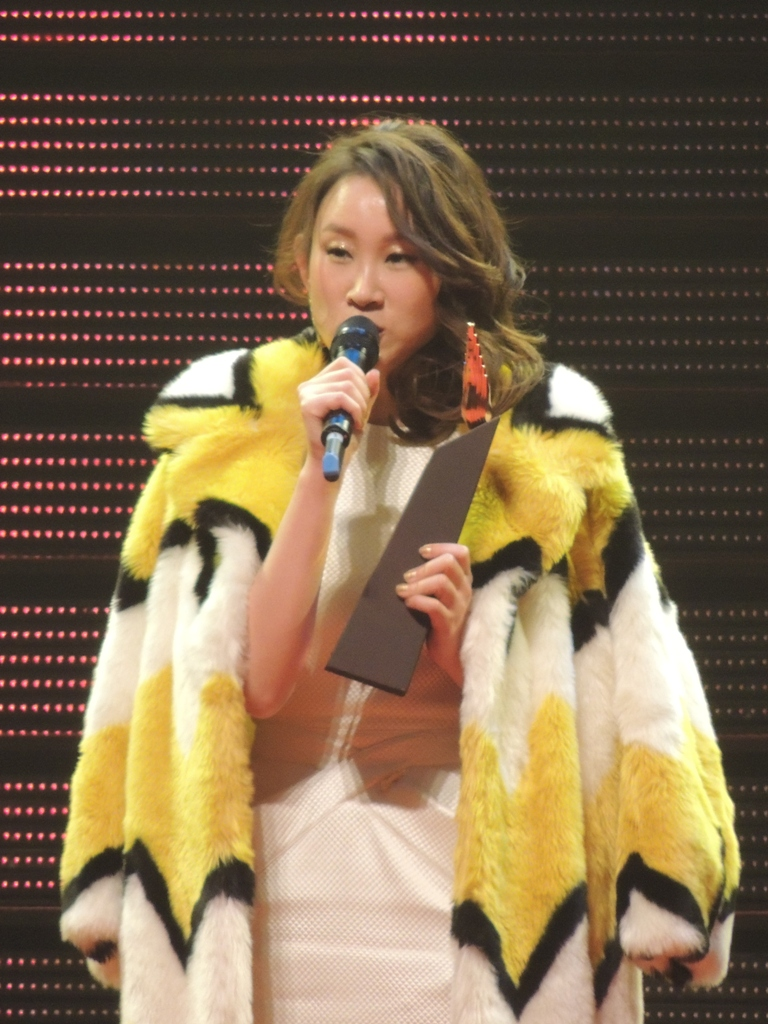
- Wong at the Ultimate Song Chart Awards Presentation, Hong Kong (2013).
- Born: Wong Oi-chi (王愛之); 18 June 1979 (age 47); British Hong Kong
- Education: University of British Columbia
- Occupations: Singer; songwriter; actress
- Years active: 2005–present
- Spouse: Eric So Cheuk-hong (m. 2015)
- Awards: Hong Kong Film Awards – Best Supporting Actress; 2014 Golden Chicken 3; 2022 Table for Six; Best New Performer; 2014 Golden Chicken 3 Asian Television Awards – Best Comedy Performance By an Actor/Actress; 2015 Come On, Cousin

Chinese name
- Chinese: 王菀之
Transcriptions
Standard Mandarin
- Hanyu Pinyin: wang2 wan3 zhi1
Yue: Cantonese
- Jyutping: wong4 jyun2 zi1
- Musical career
- Genres: C-pop; Cantopop
- Instruments: Vocals; piano; guitar; carlimba; flute
- Labels: East Asia Music; Media Asia Music; Universal Music Group

Ivana Wong Yuen-chi (Chinese: 王菀之; born 18 June 1979) is a Hong Kong singer, songwriter, and actress. She made her debut in 2005 with the self-titled EP Ivana. She is a four-time winner of the Ultimate Song Chart Awards Singer-songwriter Gold Award, and a three-time Hong Kong Film Awards winner.

== Music career ==
In 2000, she won the 12th CASH Song Writers Quest competition with her song "Just a Misunderstanding" (是個誤會沒甚可悲). In 2005, she signed with Universal Music Hong Kong, and made her debut with the self-titled EP Ivana.

In 2011, Ivana wrote and performed the theme song "Missed Address" for Andrew Lau's film A Beautiful Life. It was nominated as Best Original Film Song in a Movie Picture. In 2012, her song (Chinese: 留白; Jyutping: lau4 baak6) achieved the 2012 Golden Song JSG Award (Jade Solid Gold Awards Presentation) and was the only song awarded in all four music award ceremonies in the industry. Her debut concert held in the Hong Kong Coliseum in October 2011, “The Water Lily Concert”, led by three renowned musical directors working with an orchestra of forty-two musicians, was considered unprecedented and phenomenal, and was recognized by all as an “art Show upsurge that overpowers the HK Coliseum”. She then had her second concert held in the Hong Kong Coliseum in May 2014, and her first collaboration concert with the Hong Kong Philharmonic Orchestra held in the Concert Hall at the Hong Kong Cultural Centre in October 2015, “Fragrance of Music, Ivana Wong x Hong Kong Philharmonic Orchestra”. Both concerts received immense praise.

== Acting career ==
In 2010, she appeared in the musical stage play Octave, which held nineteen full-house shows, and the music she wrote for this drama was nominated for The Best Original Music Score in a Drama in the 20th Hong Kong Drama Society Award. In 2011, her appearance in the Broadway Musical “I Love You Because” brought her the first nomination for Best Supporting Actress in the 21st Hong Kong Drama Award Presentation.

In 2013, she starred in the comedy television series Inbound Troubles. She made her film debut in the 2014 Lunar New Year movie Golden Chickensss, and was nominated for Best New Performer and Best Supporting Actress at the 34th Hong Kong Film Awards in 2015, going on to win both awards. She was also named Best Newcomer at the 2014 Hong Kong Film Directors’ Guild. She participated in the performance of the stage play "Little HK 4-6" from 2013 to 2017. In May 2018, she formed “Lungg” together with Michael Ning and Yeung Wai Leun (Lun) for the 21 performances of the "Laboratory". In August 2019, she translated the Broadway romantic music comedy "First Date". Ivana Wong is the initiator of this play.

In 2022, she portrayed Josephine in the comedy film Table for Six, earning critical praise. She won Best Supporting Actress for the second time at the 41st Hong Kong Film Awards.

== Discography ==
- 2005 May - Ivana - Universal Music
- 2005 November - I Love My Name - Universal Music
- 2006 December - Poetry. Painting - Universal Music
- 2007 June - Read My Senses... New Songs + Best Selections - Universal Music
- 2007 December - Ivana First Mandarin Album - SeedMusic / East Asia
- 2008 October - Infinity Journey - East Asia
- 2009 October - On Wings Of Time - East Asia
- 2010 July - Octave EP - East Asia
- 2011 May - Cinema of Love - East Asia
- 2011 October - The Songbird Anthology - East Asia
- 2013 February - Atmosphere EP - East Asia
- 2013 June - Sunny Songs Collection - East Asia
- 2017 February - The Whimsical Voyage EP - Media Asia
- 2017 March - Much Feeling Little Thinking - Media Asia

== Awards ==
- 2000 – CASH Song Writers Quest Champion
  2000 CASH 流行曲創作大賽冠軍
- 2005 – TVB JSG Seasonal (Second) "Newcomers" Award (one of the awards)
  2005 TVB勁歌金曲優秀選第二回"新人薦場飆星獎" (得獎者之一)
- 2005 – TVB Top Ten Children's Songs – "Little Happy Doctor"
  2005 十大兒歌金曲(得獎作品《快樂小博士》)
- 2005 – Metroshowbiz Top Ten New Stars Second Round "Dazzling New Female Star"
  2005 新城十強新星鬥第二回「奪目女新星」
- 2005 – Friday Weekly "University and College Students' Favourite New Singer-songwriters
  2005 學勢力xFriday大專生熱愛歌手選「大專生最熱愛唱作新人」
- 2005 – PM Newcomers Awards "PM Powerful New Singer-songwriter"
  2005 PM 樂壇新人頒獎禮"PM強勢唱作女新人"
- 2005 – TVB8 Hall of Fame "Best Female Newcomers" Silver Award
  2005 TVB8金曲榜頒獎典禮"最佳女新人銀獎"
- 2005 – Guangzhou Radio/TV Hall of Fame "Best Female Newcomers of Year (Hong Kong, Taiwan and Overseas)" Gold Award
  2005 廣州電台/電視台05金曲金榜頒獎禮"年度最佳女新人(港台海外)金獎"
- 2005 – Metroshowbiz Hits New Hopes Award (one of the awarded)
  2005 新城勁爆唱好新希望獎
- 2005 – Metroshowbiz "Hits Singer-songwriters of New Generation" (one of the awarded)
  2005 新城勁爆新一代創作歌手 (得獎者之一)
- 2005 – Metroshowbiz "i-Tech Metro Hits Kings of New Singers" (one of the awarded)
  2005 i-Tech 新城勁爆新人王 (得獎者之一)
- 2005 – 4 Stages Association Performance Excellence Award – Bronze
  2005 四台聯頒音樂大獎 – 卓越表現大獎銅獎
- 2005 – Ultimate Song Chart "Singer-songwriter" Bronze Award
  2005 叱吒樂壇唱作人銅獎
- 2005 – Ultimate Song Chart "New Female Singer" Silver Award
  2005 叱吒樂壇生力軍女歌手銀獎
- 2005 – TVB JSG Award "Most Popular Singer-songwriter" Silver Award
  2005 TVB十大勁歌金曲頒獎典禮 – 最受歡迎唱作歌星銀獎
- 2005 – TVB JSG Award "Most Popular New Female Singer" Silver Award
  2005 TVB十大勁歌金曲頒獎典禮 – 最受歡迎新人獎(女)銀獎
- 2005 – Hit Rank of Chinese Songs (Cantonese)"New Female Singer Praised by the whole Nation"
  2005 加拿大至HIT中文歌曲排行榜(粵語組)"全國推祟女新人"
- 2005 – 28th Hong Kong Top Ten Chinese Songs "New Female Singer with Best Prospect" Silver Award
  2005 第二十八屆香港十大中文金曲頒獎禮"最有前途女新人銀獎"
- 2005 – SINA MUSIC Voting Index Awards "Best Live Performance" Award – "Hopes in Hand (Care Version)" with Hins Cheung
  2005 SINA MUSIC樂壇民意指數頒獎典禮 "最佳現場演繹大獎" (得獎作品：與張敬軒合唱《手望(守望版)》
- 2005 – SINA MUSIC Voting Index Awards "My Favourite New Female Singer" Gold Award
  2005 SINA MUSIC樂壇民意指數頒獎典禮"我最喜愛女新人金獎"
- 2006 – Ultimate Song Chart "Singer-songwriter" Bronze Award
  2006 叱吒樂壇唱作人銅獎
- 2007– Metroshowbiz "Hits Original Song"
  2007 新城勁爆頒獎禮 – 勁爆原創歌曲 《幸福》
- 2007– Metroshowbiz "Hits Singer- Songwriters of the year"
  2007 新城勁爆頒獎禮 – 新城勁爆創作歌手
- 2007– Ultimate Song Chart "Singer- Songwriter " Gold Award
  2007 年度叱吒樂壇流行榜頒獎典禮「叱吒樂壇唱作人 金獎」
- 2007– RoadShow Best Music Award "Best song"
  RoadShow至尊音樂頒獎禮2007 – 至尊歌曲 《真心話》
- 2007– RoadShow Best Music Award "Most improved Singer"
  2007 RoadShow至尊音樂頒獎禮 – 至尊飛躍歌手
- 2007– TVB JSG Award "Most Popular Singer-Songwriter Gold"
  2007 TVB十大勁歌金曲頒獎典禮「最受歡迎唱作歌手金獎」
- 2007– 30th Top 10 Hong Kong Chinese Songs " CASH best singer- songwriter"
  2007 第三十屆十大中文金曲 「CASH最佳創作歌手」
- 2008– Metroshowbiz "Hits Original Songwriter Album Award"
  2008 新城勁爆頒獎禮 「新城勁爆創作專輯」【Infinity Journey】
- 2008– Metroshowbiz "Hits Songwriter Album Award"
  2008 新城勁爆頒獎禮 「新城勁爆創作歌手」
- 2008– Metroshowbiz "Hits Song Award"
  2008 新城勁爆頒獎禮 「新城勁爆歌曲」《我來自火星》
- 2008– Ultimate Song Chart "Singer- Songwriter " Silver Award
  2008 年度叱吒樂壇流行榜頒獎典禮「叱咤樂壇唱作人銀獎」
- 2008– Ultimate Song Chart "Female Singer" Bronze Award
  2008 年度叱吒樂壇流行榜頒獎典禮「叱咤樂壇女歌手銅獎」
- 2008– 31st Top 10 Hong Kong Chinese Songs " Top 10 Elite Singers"
  2008 第31屆十大中文金曲頒獎典禮「優秀流行歌手大獎」
- 2008– TVB JSG Award "Most Popular Singer-Songwriter Gold"
  2008 TVB十大勁歌金曲頒獎典禮「最受歡迎唱作歌手金獎」
- 2008 – Top 10 Selling Mandarin Albums of the Year – IFPI Hong Kong Album SalesAwards
  Ivana's First Mandarin Album (王菀之Ivana首張國語創作專輯)
- 2009 - Top 10 Selling Mandarin Albums of the Year – IFPI Hong Kong Album Sales Awards
  2009 香港唱片銷量大獎 - 十大銷量本地歌手
- 2009 - Ultimate Song Chart "Singer- Songwriter " Gold Award
  2009 商業電台叱咤樂壇流行榜頒獎典禮 - 叱咤樂壇唱作人 金獎
- 2009 - TVB JSG Award "Most Popular Singer-Songwriter Gold"
  2009 TVB十大勁歌金曲頒獎典禮 - 最受歡迎唱作歌星金獎
- 2009 - 32st Top 10 Hong Kong Chinese Songs " Top 10 Elite Singers"
  2009 香港電台第32屆十大中文金曲頒獎禮 - 十大優秀流行歌手大獎
- 2009 - 32st Top 10 Hong Kong Chinese Songs
  2009 香港電台第32屆十大中文金曲頒獎禮 - 十大金曲《月亮說》
- 2009 - 32st Top 10 Hong Kong Chinese Songs "Composer Award"
  2009 香港電台第32屆十大中文金曲頒獎禮 - 作曲人大奬
- 2009 - Metroshowbiz "Hits Songwriter Album Award"
  2009 新城勁爆頒獎禮 - 新城勁爆創作歌手
- 2009 - Metroshowbiz "Hits Song Award"
  2009 新城勁爆頒獎禮 - 新城勁爆歌曲《月亮說》
- 2009 - Top 20 Sina Music Voting Index Awards"Highest listening rate"
  2009 Sina Music樂壇民意指數頒獎禮 - Sina Music最高收聽率20大歌曲《月亮說》
- 2009 - Sina Music Voting Index Awards "Creative concept album《On Wings Of Time》
  2009 Sina Music樂壇民意指數頒獎禮 - Sina Music創作概念大碟《On Wings Of Time》
- 2009 - Sina Music Voting Index Awards "My favorite creator"
  2009 Sina Music樂壇民意指數頒獎禮 - 我最喜愛唱作人(女)
- 2009 - Hit Rank of Chinese Songs (Cantonese)"National praise for Cantonse singer-songwriters"
  2009 加拿大至HiT中文歌曲排行榜 - 全國推崇粵語唱作人
- 2009 - Hit Rank of Chinese Songs (Cantonese)"Top 10 Cantonse songs nationwide"
  2009 加拿大至HiT中文歌曲排行榜 - 全國推崇十大粵語歌曲《月亮說》
- 2009 - TVB JSG Seasonal (Second)
  2009 勁歌金曲優秀選第二回 - 歌曲《大笨鐘》
- 2009 - TVB JSG Seasonal (Third)
  2009 勁歌金曲優秀選第三回 - 歌曲《月亮說》
- 2009 - Esquire“Women We Love”
  2009 Esquire月亮女神
- 2009 - TOUCH ICON
- 2009 - CASH Golden Sail Music Awards "Best melody"
  2009 CASH金帆音樂獎 - 最佳旋律《月亮說》
- 2009 - "10th Anniversary Ceremony" Top Chinese Music Award "New power female singer"
  2009 音樂風雲榜十周年盛典 - 樂壇新勢力女歌手
- 2009 - The 10th Chinese Music Media Awards "Baijia Media"s most watched album of the year《On Wings Of Time》"
  2009 第十屆華語音樂傳媒大獎 - 百家傳媒年度最受矚目專輯《On Wings Of Time》
- 2009 - Chinese Music Awards - Top 10 Chinese Album (Cantonese)《On Wings Of Time》
  2009 華語金曲獎 - 十大華語唱片(粵語)《On Wings Of Time》
- 2009 - Neway Karaoke Awards
  2009 Neway卡拉OK頒獎典禮 - 歌曲《月亮說》
- 2010 - Ultimate Song Chart "Singer- Songwriter " Gold Award
  2010 商業電台叱咤樂壇流行榜頒獎典禮 - 叱咤樂壇唱作人 金獎
- 2010 - TVB JSG Award "Top 10 Golden Songs"
  2010 TVB十大勁歌金曲頒獎典禮 - 十大金曲《開籠雀》
- 2010 - Metroshowbiz "Hits Singer- Songwriters of the year"
  2010 新城勁爆頒獎禮 - 新城勁爆創作歌手
- 2010 - Metroshowbiz "Hits Song"
  2010新城勁爆頒獎禮 - 新城勁爆歌曲《開籠雀》
- 2010 - Sina Music Voting Index Awards "My favorite female singer"
  2010 Music樂壇民意指數頒獎禮 - Sina Music我最喜愛女歌手
- 2010 - Sina Music Voting Index Awards "Top 20 songs with highest listening rate"
  2010 Music樂壇民意指數頒獎禮 - Sina Music最高收聽率20大歌曲《開籠雀》
- 2010 - CASH Golden Sail Music Awards "Best singer performance"
  2010 CASH金帆音樂獎 - 最佳女歌手演繹《小團圓》
- 2010 - CASH Golden Sail Music Awards "Best Choral Interpretation"
  2010 CASH金帆音樂獎 - 最佳合唱演繹《高八度》
- 2010 - TVB JSG Seasonal (Second)
  2010 勁歌金曲優秀選第二回 - 歌曲《開籠雀》
- 2010 - TOUCH ICON
- 2010 - JET ICON
- 2011 - The 31st Hong Kong Film Awards – Best Original Film Song (Movie “A Beautiful Life”)(Nomination)
  2011 第31屆香港電影金像獎 - 最佳原創電影歌曲獎 提名《電影：不再讓你孤單》
- 2011 - Hong Kong Top Sales Music Award "Top 10 selling local album"《The Songbird Anthology》
  2011 IFPI香港唱片銷量大獎 - 十大銷量本地唱片《The Songbird Anthology》
- 2011 - Ultimate Song Chart "Singer - Songwriter" Bronze Award
  2011 商業電台叱咤樂壇流行榜頒獎典禮 - 叱咤樂壇唱作人 銅獎
- 2011 - Ultimate Song Chart "Top 10 professional referrals" Sixth place
  2011 商業電台叱咤樂壇流行榜頒獎典禮 - 專業推介叱咤十大 第六位《末日》
- 2011 - TVB JSG Award - Asia-Pacific's most popular Hong Kong female singer
  2011 TVB十大勁歌金曲頒獎典禮 - 亞太區最受歡迎香港女歌星
- 2011 - TVB JSG Award "Most Popular Singer-Songwriter" Silver Award
  2011 十大勁歌金曲頒獎典禮 - 最受歡迎唱作歌星 銀獎
- 2011 - TVB JSG Award - Top 10 Golden Songs
  2011 TVB十大勁歌金曲頒獎典禮 - 十大金曲《水百合》
- 2011 - Metroshowbiz "Asian singer - Songwriter award"
  2011 新城勁爆頒獎禮 - 新城勁爆亞洲創作歌手大獎
- 2011 - Metroshowbiz "Best Songs"
  2011 新城勁爆頒獎禮 - 新城勁爆歌曲《末日》
- 2011 - 34th Top 10 Hong Kong Chinese Songs
  2011 香港電台第34屆十大中文金曲頒獎禮 - 十大金曲《末日》
- 2011 - 34th Top 10 Hong Kong Chinese Songs - Composer Award
  2011 香港電台第34屆十大中文金曲頒獎禮 - 作曲人大奬
- 2011 - Sina Music Voting Index Awards "My favorite singer-songwriter"
  2011 Music樂壇民意指數頒獎禮 - Sina Music我最喜愛創作歌手
- 2011 - Sina Music Voting Index Awards "Top 20 songs with highest listening rate"
  2011 Music樂壇民意指數頒獎禮 - Sina Music最高收聽率20大歌曲《末日》
- 2011 - Sina Music Voting Index Awards "My favorite concert"
  2011 Sina Music樂壇民意指數頒獎禮 - Sina Music我最喜愛演唱會《“水．百合”演唱會》
- 2011 - Yahoo! Music Award - Song Award
  2011 Yahoo! Music Award - 歌曲獎《末日》
- 2011 - Yahoo! Music Award - Concert Award
  2011 Yahoo! Music Award - 演唱會獎《“水．百合”演唱會》
- 2011 - TVB8 Award - Song Award
  2011 TVB8金曲榜頒獎禮 - 金曲獎《錯過了地址》
- 2011 - TVB8 Award - The most popular Cantonese songs
  2011 TVB8金曲榜頒獎禮 - 最受歡迎粵語歌曲《末日》
- 2011 - TVB8 Award - The most popular singer-songwriter Silver Award
  2011 TVB8金曲榜頒獎禮 - 最受歡迎唱作歌手 銀獎
- 2011 - Sprite List Award - The best singer-songwriter(Hong Kong)
  2011 雪碧榜頒獎禮 - 最優秀創作歌手(香港地區)
- 2011 - Sprite List Award - Most popular female singer(Hong Kong)
  2011 雪碧榜頒獎禮 - 最受歡迎女歌手(香港地區)
- 2011 - TVB JSG Seasonal (Third)
  2011 TVB勁歌金曲優秀選第三回 - 歌曲《水百合》
- 2011 - TVB JSG Seasonal (Second)
  2011 TVB勁歌金曲優秀選第二回 - 歌曲《末日》
- 2011 - TVB JSG Seasonal (First)
  2011 TVB勁歌金曲優秀選第一回 - 歌曲《最好的》
- 2012 - Ultimate Song Chart "Top 10 professional referrals" The third
  2012 商業電台叱咤樂壇流行榜頒獎典禮 - 專業推介叱咤十大 第三位《留白》
- 2012 - TVB JSG Award - Gold Medal
  2012 TVB十大勁歌金曲頒獎典禮 - 金曲金獎《留白》
- 2012 - TVB JSG Award - Top 10 Golden Songs
  2012 TVB十大勁歌金曲頒獎典禮 - 十大金曲《留白》
- 2012 - TVB JSG Award - Most popular choral songs Gold Award
  2012 TVB十大勁歌金曲頒獎典禮 - 最受歡迎合唱歌曲 金獎《生命之花》
- 2012 - 35th Top 10 Hong Kong Chinese Songs " Top 10 Elite Singers"
  2012 香港電台第35屆十大中文金曲頒獎禮 - 十大優秀流行歌手大獎
- 2012 - 35th Top 10 Hong Kong Chinese Songs
  2012 香港電台第35屆十大中文金曲頒獎禮 - 十大金曲《留白》
- 2012 - Metroshowbiz "Asian singer-Songwriter award"
  2012 新城勁爆頒獎禮 - 新城勁爆亞洲創作歌手大獎
- 2012 - Metroshowbiz "Best Songs"
  2012 新城勁爆頒獎禮 - 新城勁爆歌曲《留白》
- 2012 - TVB JSG Seasonal (Third)
  2012 TVB勁歌金曲優秀選第三回 - 歌曲《留白》
- 2012 - TVB JSG Seasonal (First)
  2012 TVB勁歌金曲優秀選第一回 - 歌曲《下次愛你》
- 2012 - Hong Kong Top Sales Music Award "Top 10 selling local singers"
  2012 IFPI 香港唱片銷量大獎 - 十大銷量本地歌手
- 2013 - Hong Kong Top Sales Music Award "Top 10 selling local singers"
  2013 IFPI 香港唱片銷量大獎 - 十大銷量本地歌手
- 2013 - Hong Kong Top Sales Music Award "Top 10 selling local album"
  2013 IFPI香港唱片銷量大獎 - 十大銷量本地唱片《晴歌集》
- 2013 - Ultimate Song Chart "Female Singer " Bronze Award
  2013 商業電台叱咤樂壇流行榜頒獎典禮 - 叱咤樂壇女歌手 銅獎
- 2013 - 36th Top 10 Hong Kong Chinese Songs " Top 10 Elite Singers"
  2013 香港電台第36屆十大中文金曲頒獎禮 - 優秀流行歌手大獎
- 2013 - 36th Top 10 Hong Kong Chinese Songs
  2013 香港電台第36屆十大中文金曲頒獎禮 - 十大中文金曲《哥歌》
- 2013 - 36th Top 10 Hong Kong Chinese Songs - Composer Award
  2013 香港電台第36屆十大中文金曲頒獎禮 - 作曲人獎
- 2013 - 36th Top 10 Hong Kong Chinese Songs - Lyricist Award
  2013香港電台第36屆十大中文金曲頒獎禮 - 填詞人獎
- 2013 - Metroshowbiz "Asian singer-Songwriter award"
  2013 新城勁爆頒獎禮 - 新城勁爆亞洲創作歌手大獎
- 2013 - Metroshowbiz "Best Songs"
  2013 新城勁爆頒獎禮 - 新城勁爆歌曲《哥歌》
- 2013 - TVB JSG Seasonal - Golden Melody Award
  2013 TVB勁歌金曲優秀選 - 金曲獎《哥歌》
- 2013 - TVB JSG Award 16th
  2013 TVB勁歌金曲頒獎典禮 - 勁歌金曲 第十七位《哥歌》
- 2013 - TVB JSG Award 17th
  2013 TVB勁歌金曲頒獎典禮 - 勁歌金曲 第十六位《妳的名字我的姓氏》
- 2013 - TOUCH ICON
- 2014 - Hong Kong Top Sales Music Award "Top 10 selling local singers"
  2014 IFPI香港唱片銷量大獎 - 十大銷量本地歌手
- 2014 - Hong Kong Top Sales Music Award "Produced by the best-selling local live recording audiovisual"
  2014 香港唱片銷量大獎 - 最暢銷本地現場錄制音像出品《菀之論王菀之2014演唱會》
- 2014 - Ultimate Song Chart "Singer - Songwriter" Gold Award
  2014 商業電台叱咤樂壇流行榜頒獎典禮 - 叱咤樂壇唱作人 金獎
- 2014 - 37th Top 10 Hong Kong Chinese Songs " Top 10 Elite Singers"
  2014 香港電台第37屆十大中文金曲頒獎禮 - 優秀流行歌手大獎
- 2014 - 37th Top 10 Hong Kong Chinese Songs " CASH best singer- songwriter"
  2014 香港電台第37屆十大中文金曲頒獎禮 - CASH最佳創作歌手大獎
- 2014 - CASH Golden Sail Music Awards "Best singer performance"
  2014 CASH金帆音樂獎 - 最佳女歌手演繹《天堂有路》
- 2014 - Metroshowbiz "Best Songs"
  2014 新城勁爆頒獎禮 - 新城勁爆歌曲《好時辰》
- 2014 - Metroshowbiz "Digital music most appreciates female singers"
  2014 新城勁爆頒獎禮 - 新城數碼音樂台最欣賞女歌手
- 2014 - TVB JSG Seasonal
  2014 勁歌金曲優秀選 - 得獎歌曲《天堂有路》
- 2015 – 34th Hong Kong Film Award "Best Supporting Actress and Best New Performer"
  2015 第三十四屆香港電影金像獎「最佳女配角獎」及「最佳新演員獎」
- 2015 - CASH Golden Sail Music Awards "Best melody"
  2015 CASH金帆音樂獎 - 最佳旋律《我們他們》
- 2015 - IFPI Music Video Awards - 《小手術》
- 2015 - Ultimate Song Chart "Female Singer " Silver Award
  2015 商業電台叱咤樂壇流行榜頒獎典禮 - 叱咤樂壇女歌手 銀獎
- 2015 - Ultimate Song Chart "Singer - Songwriter" Silver Award
  2015 商業電台叱咤樂壇流行榜頒獎典禮 - 叱咤樂壇唱作人 銀獎
- 2015 - 38th Top 10 Hong Kong Chinese Songs " Top 10 Elite Singers"
  2015 香港電台第38屆十大中文金曲頒獎禮 - 優秀流行歌手大獎
- 2015 - 38th Top 10 Hong Kong Chinese Songs " CASH best singer- songwriter"
  2015 香港電台第38屆十大中文金曲頒獎禮 - CASH最佳創作歌手大獎
- 2016 - Hong Kong Top Sales Music Award "Produced by the best-selling local live recording audiovisual"
  2016 IFPI香港唱片銷量大獎 - 最暢銷本地現場錄製音像出品
  《Fragrance of Music with Alex Fung & Hong Kong Philharmonic Orchestra Live》
- 2017 - 40th Top 10 Hong Kong Chinese Songs " Top 10 Elite Singers"
  2017 第四十屆十大中文金曲頒獎典禮 - 優秀流行歌手大獎
- 2017 - Metroshowbiz "Best Songs"
  2017 新城勁爆頒獎禮 - 勁爆歌曲《突然一生人》
- 2017 - Metroshowbiz "Singer - Songwriter"
  2017 新城勁爆頒獎禮 - 勁爆唱作人
- 2017 - Metroshowbiz "Female singer"
  2017 新城勁爆頒獎禮 - 勁爆女歌手
- 2017 - Ultimate Song Chart "Singer - Songwriter" Silver Award
  2017 叱咤樂壇流行榜頒獎典禮 - 叱咤樂壇唱作人 銀獎
- 2017 - Ultimate Song Chart "Female Singer " Bronze Award
  2017 叱咤樂壇流行榜頒獎典禮 - 叱咤樂壇女歌手 銅獎
- 2018 - Ultimate Song Chart "Top 10 professional referrals" Tenth place
  2018 叱咤樂壇流行榜頒獎典禮 - 專業推介叱咤十大 第十位《沉默的士高》

== Acting awards & nominations ==
- 2011 -The 20th Hong Kong Drama Awards – Best Original Music (Drama “Octave”) (Nomination)
- 2012 -The 21st Hong Kong Drama Awards – Best Supporting Actress (Drama “I Love You Because”)(Nomination)
- 2012 -The 31st Hong Kong Film Awards – Best Original Film Song (Movie “A Beautiful Life”)(Nomination)
- 2015 -The 9th Asian Film Awards – Best Newcomer (Movie “Golden Chicken SSS”) (Nomination)
- 2015 -The 34th Hong Kong Film Awards – Best Supporting Actress (Movie “Golden Chicken SSS”)
- 2015 -The 34th Hong Kong Film Awards – Best Newcomer (Movie “Golden Chicken SSS”)
- 2015 -Hong Kong Film Directors’ Guild – Best Newcomer (Movie “Golden Chicken SSS”)
- 2015 -The 15th Chinese Film Media Awards – Most Outstanding Performance Award (Movie “Golden Chicken SSS”)
- 2015 -Singapore Asian Television Award – Best Actress in Comedy (TVB Drama “Come On Cousin”)
- 2015 -The 34th Hong Kong Film Awards – Best Newcomer (Movie “Delete My Love”) (Nomination)
- 2015 -The 34th Hong Kong Film Awards – Best Newcomer (Movie “Break Up 100”) (Nomination)
- 2015 -The 34th Hong Kong Film Awards – Best Original Film Song (Movie “Break Up 100”)(Nomination)
- 2019 -The 29th Hong Kong Drama Awards – Best Actress (Drama “First Date”) (Nomination)
- 2023 -The 41st Hong Kong Film Awards – Best Supporting Actress (Movie “Table for Six”)
- 2023 -The 41st Hong Kong Film Awards – Best Original Film Song (Movie “Table for Six”) (Nomination)

== Filmography ==
Television series

- 2013 - Inbound Troubles
- 2014 - Come On, Cousin

Films

- 2007 - The Simpsons Movie (voice acting as Lisa)
- 2008 - 10 Promises to My Dog (voice acting as Akari)
- 2014 - Temporary Family (guest role) (Director: Vincci Cheuk Wan Chi)
- 2014 - Break Up 100 (Director: Lawrence Cheng)
- 2014 - Delete My Love (Director: Patrick Kong)
- 2014 - Golden Chickensss (Director: Matt Chow)
- 2015 - The Little Prince (voice acting as The Little Girl)
- 2015 - Love Detective (Director: Patrick Kong)
- 2015 - Inside Out (voice acting as Sadness)
- 2015 - 12 Golden Ducks (Director: Matt Chow)
- 2016 - Show Me Your Love (Director: Ryon Lee)
- 2016 - Kidnap Ding Ding Don (Director: Wilson Chin)
- 2017 - Goldbuster (voice acting as A Ping)
- 2017 - Our Time Will Come (Director: Ann Hui)
- 2018 - A Lifetime Treasure (Director: Andrew Lam)
- 2018 - A Beautiful Moment (Director: Patrick Kong)
- 2019 - I Love You, You Are Perfect (Director: Wong Cho-lam)
- 2020 - The Grand Grandmaster (Director: Dayo Wong)
- 2020 - The Calling of a Bus Driver (Director: Patrick Kong)
- 2022 - Table for Six (Director: Sunny Chan)
- 2023 - Everything Under Control (Director: Ying Chi Wen)
- 2023 - One More Chance (Director: Anthony Pun)
- 2024 - Table for Six 2 (Director: Sunny Chan)
- 2024 - Cesium Fallout (Director: Anthony Pun)

== Concerts / musical dramas / dramas ==
- 2006 July -Ivana Wong x Hins Cheung 903 Music is Live Concert – HK
- 2006 December -Ivana Wong x Khalil Fong Moov Live Concert – HK
- 2007 January -TVB Live House Concert – HK
- 2007 March -Ivana Wong x Hins Cheung Charity Concert – Macau
- 2007 December -“You're My True Love” Concert – Taipei, Taiwan
- 2008 July -903 Music is Live Concert – EMAX Rotunda 2, HK
- 2008 September -“I Am From Mars” Concert – Star Hall HITEC, HK (2 shows)
- 2008 October -Moov Live Music Concert – Fringe Club, HK
- 2009 February -Caring For Children Foundation 15th Anniversary Music Concert – City Hall, HK
- 2009 November -Asianwave Concert – Richmond Hill Centre for the Performing Arts, Toronto, CAN
- 2009 December -Moov Ivana Wong Little Reunion Live Concert – Y Theatre, Youth Square, HK
- 2010 July -W Creation x East Asia Musical Drama “Octave” – Lyric Theatre, HKAPA, HK (19 shows)
- 2010 November -Ivana Wong x Khalil Fong x SodaGreen 903 Music is Live Concert – Hall 5BC, HKCEC, HK
- 2011 May -Windmill Grass Theatre Musical Drama “I Love You Because” – Shouson Theatre, Arts Centre, HK (14 shows)
- 2011 October -Ivana Wong “Water．Lily” Concert 2011 – HK Coliseum, HK (2 shows)
- 2012 March -Windmill Grass Theatre Musical Drama “I Love You Because” – Lyric Theatre, HKAPA, HK (11 shows)
- 2012 May -Strawberry Festival, Love Stage, Beijing, China
- 2012 May -Strawberry Festival, Love Stage, Shanghai, China
- 2012 October -Strawberry Festival, Main Stage, ZhenJiang, Shanghai, China
- 2012 November -Moov Idol Café Mini Live Concert – HK
- 2012 December -Ivana Wong x McDull x Hong Kong Sinfonietta “A Sentimental Little Christmas” – Concert Hall, City Hall, HK (4 shows)
- 2013 April -Strawberry Festival, Main Stage, Shanghai, China
- 2013 May -Strawberry Festival, Main Stage, Beijing, China
- 2013 May -Ivana Wong x Fiona Sit x Kary Ng x Eman Lam 903 Music is Live Concert – Hall 5BC, HKCEC, HK
- 2013 June -W Creation x Windmill Grass Theatre Drama “Little HK 4” – Kwai Tsing Theatre, HK (14 shows)
- 2013 September -Inbound Troubles in Genting Concert – Arena of Stars, Resorts World Genting, MY
- 2014 January -Brand's mini concert – Sun Yat-Sen Memorial Hall, Guangzhou, China
- 2014 May -Ivana Wong Concert 2014 – HK Coliseum, HK
- 2015 Jan -Ivana Wong Music Live Concert – Xinghai Concert Hall, Guangzhou, China
- 2015 July -W Creation x Windmill Grass Theatre Drama “Little HK 5” – Lyric Theatre, HKAPA, HK (21 shows)
- 2015 August -Ivana Wong Music Live Concert – Shenzhen Gymnasium, Shenzhen, China
- 2015 October -Ivana Wong Fragrance of Music with Hong Kong Philharmonic Orchestra – Concert Hall, Hong Kong Cultural Centre, HK (3 shows)
- 2015 November -Ivana Wong x Hins Cheung 903 Music is Live Concert – Hall 5BC, HKCEC, HK
- 2015 December -Ivana Wong x Louis Cheung Live Concert – Reno Ballroom, Reno Casino, Nevada, USA
- 2016 June -Kearen Pang Production x Media Asia Drama “45 mins Soulmate” – Lyric Theatre, HKAPA, HK (10 shows)
- 2017 February -Ivana Wong x Hins Cheung “The Magical Teeter Totter” Concert 2017 – HK Coliseum, HK (4 shows)
- 2017 July -W Creation x Windmill Grass Theatre x Media Asia Drama “Little HK 6” – Lyric Theatre, HKAPA, HK (21 shows)
- 2017 October - Ivana Wong x Hins Cheung “The Magical Teeter Totter” Concert 2017 – Macau
- 2018 January -Ivana Wong X MOOV 《Happiness is...》Concert – Macpherson Stadium
- 2018 May -Lungg “Laboratory” – HK Arts Centre (21 shows)
- 2018 August -Ivana Wong “Northern Lights in Shimokitazawa” Concert - Macpherson Stadium ( 2 shows)
- 2018 September -Dave Wang X Ivana Wong Live Concert – Thunder Vallery Casino Resort, California
- 2018 November -Ivana Wong Concert – Casino Rama, Canada Toronto
- 2019 May -Ivana Music Limited “First Date” - LyricTheatre, HKAPA, HK (13 shows)

=== Commercial ===
- 2005 -Trend Coffee and Food Limited
- 2005 -Symantec Norton Save & Restore Software
- 2006 -Vita “Tsing Sum Zhan” Fruity Range
- 2006 -Motorola A732
- 2007 -Estee Lauder
- 2007 -Vita “Tsing Sum Zhan”
- 2007 -Mirinda (China)
- 2007-2008 -Parsons Music
- 2008 -Reenex
- 2010 -Parsons Music
- 2011 -Reenex
- 2011 -Lactacyd Feminine Hygiene Products
- 2011 -Converse Jack Purcell Smile Campaign
- 2012-2014 -Carrera Polygon Homes (Vancouver, Canada)
- 2013 -Giordano x Hong Kong Designers “Pass the Torch, Play it Forward” Series
- 2013 -The Body Shop “Tea Tree Generation” Campaign
- 2013-2014 -Reenex
- 2013-2015 -Hung Fook Tong
- 2014 -Longchamp 20th Anniversary Iconic Bag
- 2014-2015 -Cadbury GLOW
- 2015-2016 -TSL Jewellery Finger Language Campaign
- 2015-2016 -Pricerite
- 2015-2016 -Guerlain Makeup and Fragrance
- 2015-2016 -Brand's Essence of Chicken with TangKwei
- 2015-2016 -L’OCCITANE en Provence Reine Blanche Whitening promotion campaign
- 2016 -IITTALA “Bird and the City 2016” Campaign
- 2016 -Swarovski Christmas Campaign
- 2016 -Vidal Sassoon Academy
- 2016 -nextjourney.com.hk
- 2016 -Ngong Ping 360 Summer Campaign
- 2016 -Pizza Hut American Chunky BBQ Pizza
- 2016-2017 -Lion Top Laundry Powder
- 2016-2018 -AIA Vitality Campaign
- 2016-2018 -Nutriworks Flexi-Patch
- 2017 -Citibank Citi Jetco Pay App
- 2017-2018 -Fuze Tea
- 2018 -OLAY Online
- 2018 -Onitsuka Tiger Flagship store opening
- 2018 -Maltesers online
- 2018 -Mcdonalds online
- 2020 -AZ Severe Asthma Education Campaign
- 2020 -MPF- Direct your retirement Life

=== Charity ambassador ===
- 2008-2010 -Orbis Student Ambassador
- 2010 -Oxfam Ambassador
- 2011 -Organic Day Ambassador
- 2012 -World Vision 30-Hour Famine Ambassador
- 2012 -Kiehl's Gives Event Ambassador
- 2012-2013 -Hong Kong Government Notifications Mobile Apps Ambassador
- 2012-2014 -Oxfam Unwrapped Ambassador
- 2013 -Concert in the Dark
- 2013 -Red Cross Blood Transfusion Service Ambassador
- 2013-2014 -Grand Parents Day Ambassador
- 2014 -Pink Dessert Ambassador
- 2014-2016 -Green Power 5-Min Shower Campaign Ambassador
- 2015 -Breast Cancer Foundation Promotion Ambassador
- 2015 -Staunton ”Play Me, I'm Yours” Street Piano Campaign
- 2016 -Tiffany & Co. Holiday Charity Campaign
- 2017 -Hong Kong Tourism Board “Old Town Central” Campaign
- 2018 -JCI Hong Kong Ambassador
- 2018 -Staunton Smart Fashion Runway
- 2018-2023 -World Vision (China) “End Violence Against Children” Campaign
