= Hong Kong Film Award for Best Original Film Song =

Annual Chinese film award

- Country: Hong Kong
- Presented by: Hong Kong Film Awards
- Final award: 2022
- Winners: "Origin of Time"; One Second Champion; Composer: Endy Chow, Chiu Sin-hang; Lyricist: Cheng Man; Vocal Artist: Endy Chow, Chiu Sin-hang @ToNick; (2022)

The Hong Kong Film Award for Best Original Film Song is an award presented annually at the Hong Kong Film Awards for a film with the best original song. As of 2016 the current winner is She Remembers, He Forgets with Day Tai composing, Saville Chan for lyrics and Feanna Wong singing.

== Winners and nominees ==
Table key
‡	Indicates the winner

Year	Original Film Song	Film	Note
2022 (40th)	"Origin of Time"‡	One Second Champion‡	
2022 (40th)	"Welcome to This City"	The Way We Keep Dancing	
2022 (40th)	"Dead Lock"	Raging Fire	
2022 (40th)	"Zero to Hero"	Zero to Hero	
2022 (40th)	"Drifting"	Drifting	
