= Patra Au =

Hong Kong actress (born 1952/1953)

- 區嘉雯
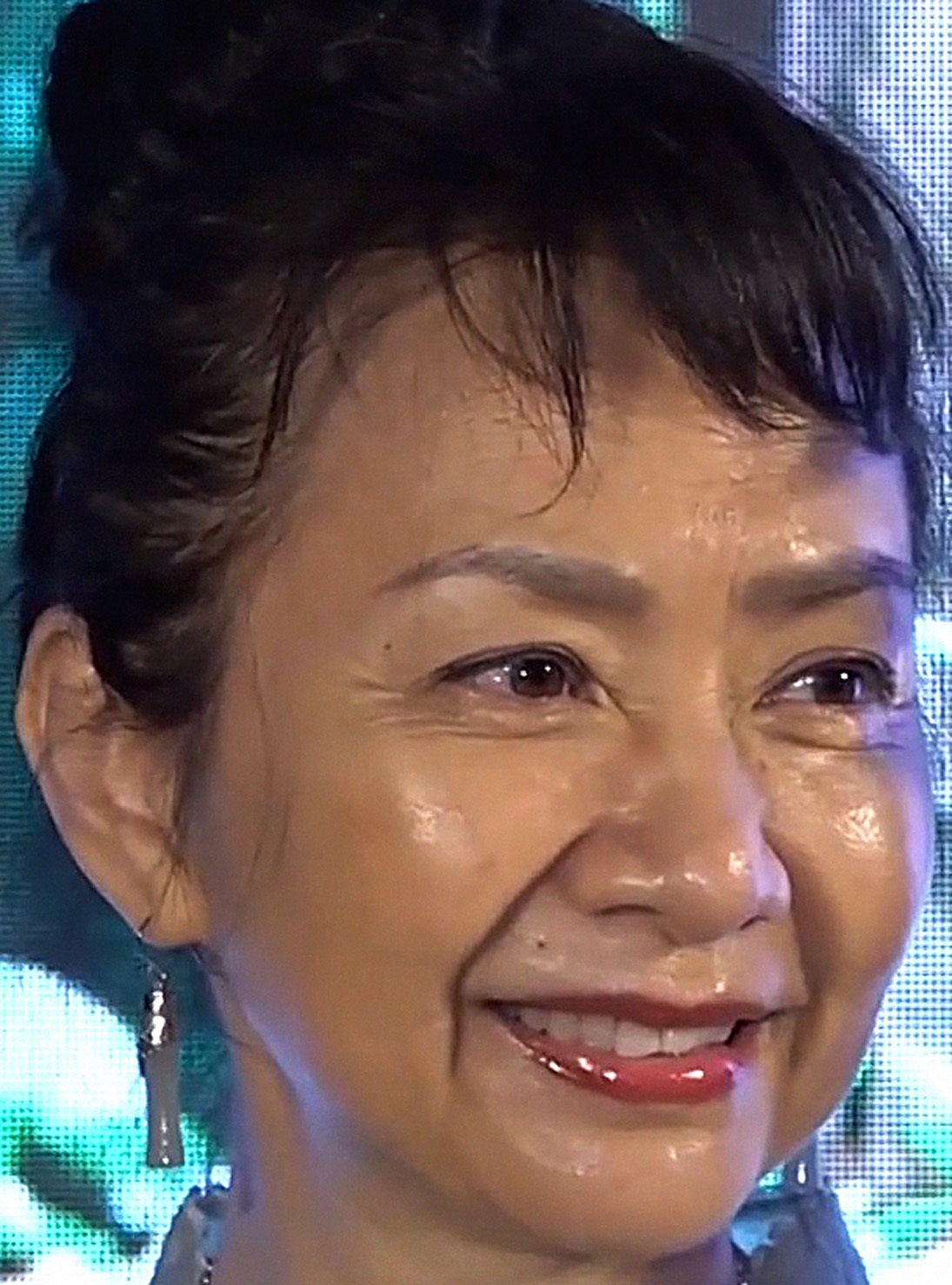
- Au in May 2020
- Born: Au Ga-man; 1952 or 1953 (age 73–74); Hong Kong
- Education: University of Missouri; University of Hong Kong (PGDE)
- Occupations: Actress; teacher
- Years active: 2020–present

Patra Au Ga-man (Chinese: 區嘉雯; born 1952/1953) is a Hong Kong actress and retired secondary school teacher best known for her role in the drama film Suk Suk (2020), which she won Best Supporting Actress and was nominated for Best New Performer in the 39th Hong Kong Film Awards. She was nominated for Best Supporting Actress again in the 41st Hong Kong Film Awards for her performance in the drama film The Narrow Road (2022).

== Biography ==
Au was born in 1952 or 1953. She migrated to the United States when she was young and attended the University of Missouri. After she got divorced, she returned to Hong Kong and taught English in a secondary school. She later acquired a Postgraduate Diploma in Education from the University of Hong Kong. In the early years of teaching, some of her students suggested her to join a theatre company because she often incorporates drama and roleplaying into her classes to pique the students' interest in language learning. Therefore, Au started acting as a hobby and began to feature in stage plays, most notably co-starring alongside Connie Chan in Raymond To's 1999 adaptation of A Sentimental Journey.

After retirement, Au received her first onscreen role at the age of 67, as the wife of an aged and deflated taxi driver, in the 2020 drama film Suk Suk directed by Ray Yeung. Au won Best Supporting Actress and was nominated for Best New Performer in the 39th Hong Kong Film Awards, making her the oldest nominee of the Best New Performer category. She was also nominated for Best Supporting Actress in the 56th Golden Horse Awards with the critically acclaimed role. After her breakout performance, she received her first television role in the ViuTV drama series Single Papa later in the same year. In 2022, Au appeared in the featured films The Sparring Partner and The Narrow Road. The latter role earned her another nomination for Best Supporting Actress in the 41st Hong Kong Film Awards. In 2024, she was cast in a lead role in Ray Yeung's drama film All Shall Be Well, for which she was nominated for Best Leading Actress in the 61st Golden Horse Awards.

== Filmography ==
=== Film ===
| Year | Title | Role | Notes/Ref. |
|---|---|---|---|
| 2020 | Suk Suk | Ching (清) | |
| 2022 | The Sparring Partner | Little O's mother | |
| 2022 | The Narrow Road | Wong Ying (黃英) | |
| 2023 | The Sunny Side of the Street | Mrs So | |
| 2023 | Everyphone Everywhere | Old lady | Cameo |
| 2024 | All Shall Be Well | Angie | |
| 2024 | Cesium Fallout | Director of Hong Kong Observatory | |

=== Television ===
| Year | Title | Role | Notes/Ref. |
|---|---|---|---|
| 2020 | Single Papa | Mona | Recurring role |
| 2022 | Generation Slash | Shun Man Ha (孫曼霞) | Recurring role |
| 2022 | Food Buddies | Jan's supervisor | Guest role |

== Awards and nominations ==
| Year | Award | Category | Work | Result | Ref. |
|---|---|---|---|---|---|
| 2019 | 56th Golden Horse Awards | Best Supporting Actress | Suk Suk | Nominated | |
| 2020 | 39th Hong Kong Film Awards | Best Supporting Actress | Suk Suk | Won | |
| 2020 | 39th Hong Kong Film Awards | Best New Performer | Suk Suk | Nominated | |
| 2020 | 14th Asian Film Awards | Best Supporting Actress | Suk Suk | Nominated | |
| 2023 | 41st Hong Kong Film Awards | Best Supporting Actress | The Narrow Road | Nominated | |
| 2024 | 61st Golden Horse Awards | Best Leading Actress | All Shall Be Well | Nominated | |
| 2025 | 43rd Hong Kong Film Awards | Best Actress | All Shall Be Well | Nominated | |
