= 43rd Hong Kong Film Awards =

2025 Hong Kong Film Awards

- Official poster
- Date: 27 April 2025
- Site: Hong Kong Cultural Centre; Tsim Sha Tsui, Kowloon
- Organized by: Hong Kong Film Awards Association
- Official website: Hong Kong Film Awards

Highlights
- Best Film: Twilight of the Warriors: Walled In
- Best Director: Soi Cheang; Twilight of the Warriors: Walled In
- Best Actor: Sean Lau; Papa
- Best Actress: Michelle Wai; The Last Dance
- Most awards: Twilight of the Warriors: Walled In (9)
- Most nominations: The Last Dance (18)

Television coverage
- Channel: ViuTV
- Network: HK Television Entertainment

The 43rd Hong Kong Film Awards (Chinese: 第43屆香港電影金像獎) honored the best Hong Kong films of 2024. Organized by the Hong Kong Film Awards Association, the ceremony took place at the Hong Kong Cultural Centre in Tsim Sha Tsui, Kowloon on 27 April 2025.

Twilight of the Warriors: Walled In, despite their nominations (14 nominations total) was fewer than The Last Dance (18 nominations total), was the night's biggest winner with nine awards total, including Best Film and Best Director (Soi Cheang). Sean Lau won Best Actor with Papa, while Michelle Wai received her first Best Actress win with The Last Dance.

== Winners and nominees ==
Nominees were announced on 14 February 2025.

Winners are listed first, highlighted in boldface, and indicated with a double dagger (‡).

**Best Film**: **Twilight of the Warriors: Walled In – John Chong and Wilson Yip, producers** ‡; Papa – Amy Chin, producer; The Way We Talk – Adam Wong, Jacqueline Liu, and Ho Hong, producers; The Last Dance – Anselm Chan, Jason Siu, and Chan Sing-yan, producers; All Shall Be Well – Michael J. Werner, Teresa Kwong, Sandy Yip, Chowee Leow, and Stan Guingon, producers	**Best Director**: **Soi Cheang** – **Twilight of the Warriors: Walled In** ‡; Philip Yung, Au Cheuk Man – Papa; Adam Wong – The Way We Talk; Chan Mou Yin Anselm – The Last Dance; Ray Yeung – All Shall Be Well
**Best Actor**: **Sean Lau** – **Papa** ‡; Raymond Lam – Twilight of the Warriors: Walled In; Neo Yau – The Way We Talk; Michael Hui – The Last Dance; Aaron Kwok – Rob N Roll	**Best Actress**: **Michelle Wai** – **The Last Dance** ‡; Natalie Hsu – Last Song for You; Hedwig Tam – Montages of a Modern Motherhood; Chung Suet Ying – The Way We Talk; Patra Au – All Shall Be Well
**Best Supporting Actor**: **Chu Pak Hong** – **The Last Dance** ‡; Louis Koo – Twilight of the Warriors: Walled In; Philip Ng – Twilight of the Warriors: Walled In; Siuyea Lo – Montages of a Modern Motherhood; Paul Chun – The Last Dance	**Best Supporting Actress**: **Jo Koo** – **Papa** ‡; Stephy Tang – Love Lies; Rachel Leung – The Last Dance; Rosa Maria Velasco – The Last Dance; Maggie Li Lin Lin – All Shall Be Well
**Best New Director**: **Robin Lee** – **Four Trails** ‡; Jill Lai Yin Leung – Last Song for You; Ho Miu Ki – Love Lies; Albert Leung, Herbert Leung – Stuntman; Thomas Lee, Daniel Ho – An Abandoned Team	**Best New Performer**: **Dylan So** – **Papa** ‡; Jozev Kiu – Twilight of the Warriors: Walled In; Ian Chan – Last Song for You; Marco Ng – The Way We Talk; Marife Yau – Blossoms Under Somewhere
**Best Screenplay**: **The Last Dance** – **Chan Mou Yin Anselm, Cheng Wai-kei** ‡; Love Lies – Ho Miu Ki, Chan Hing Kai; Papa – Philip Yung; All Shall Be Well – Ray Yeung; Rob N Roll – Albert Mak, Ryker Chan, Man Uen-Ching	**Best Asian Chinese Language Film**: (Taiwan) **Old Fox** ‡; (China) Black Dog; (Taiwan) Dead Talents Society; (China) Article 20; (China) YOLO
**Best Film Editing**: **Twilight of the Warriors: Walled In** – **Cheung Ka-fai** ‡; Papa – Jojo Shek; Four Trails – Robin Lee; The Last Dance – William Chang, Curran Pang; The Prosecutor – Li Ka-wing	**Best Cinematography**: **Twilight of the Warriors: Walled In** – **Cheng Siu-keung** ‡; Last Song for You – Oliver Lau; Papa – Chin Ting-chang, Leung Yau-cheong; The Last Dance – Anthony Pun; Cesium Fallout – Anthony Pun
**Best Original Film Score**: **The Last Dance** – **Chu Wan Pin** ‡; Twilight of the Warriors: Walled In – Kenji Kawai; Last Song for You – Chan Kwong-wing, Kay Chan; Love Lies – Day Tai; Papa – Ding Ke	**Best Original Film Song**: **"The Last Dance" from The Last Dance** ‡; **Composer/Lyricist/Vocal Artist: Terence Lam**; "Last Song for You" from Last Song for You; Composer: Chan Kwong-wing; Lyricist: Oscar; Vocal Artist: Ekin Cheng, Ian Chan; "Pen Pal" from Love Lies; Composer: Day Tai; Lyricist: Leung Pak Kin, Ho Miu Ki; Vocal Artist: Cheung Tin Fu; "What if" from The Way We Talk; Composer: Day Tai; Lyricist: Chung Suet Ying; Vocal Artist: Panther Chan; "Lak1 Kak1" from Blossoms Under Somewhere; Composer: Sara Fung; Lyricist: Wong Lok Yee Yvette, Chow Yiu Fai; Vocal Artist: Marife Yau
**Best Art Direction**: **Twilight of the Warriors: Walled In** – **Mak Kwok Keung, Chau Sai Hung Ambrose** ‡; Last Song for You – Twiggy Tang; Papa – Mak Tsz Kwan Ida; The Last Dance – Yiu Hon Man; Cesium Fallout – Lee Kin Wai	**Best Costume & Makeup Design**: **Twilight of the Warriors: Walled In** – **Bruce Yu, Karen Yip** ‡; Love Lies – Dora Ng, ShaSha Law; Papa – Dora Ng, Kayden Chan; The Last Dance – Lee Pik Kwan; Rob N Roll – Man Lim Chung, Kwok In Wai
**Best Sound Design**: **Twilight of the Warriors: Walled In** – **Yiu Chun-hin, Cheung Man-hoi, To Burnard Davy** ‡; The Way We Talk – Cyrus Tang Hok-lun, Mandy Kwan Wai-sum; The Last Dance – Yiu Chun-hin; Cesium Fallout – Tu Duu-chih, Chiang Yi-chen; The Prosecutor – George Lee	**Best Visual Effects**: **Twilight of the Warriors: Walled In** – **Lin Chun Yue Jules, Ma Siu Fu, Garrett K Lam, Yee Kwok Leung** ‡; Customs Frontline – Wong Sum Yin, Lin Chun Yue Jules, Loki Ho, Yee Kwok Leung; The Last Dance – Chan Tik Hoi Water; Cesium Fallout – Dennis Yeung, Adrian Chan, Dennis Yeung; The Moon Thieves – Ng Ka Lung, Yeung Hey Chiu, Wave Cheung Yiu Ho
**Best Action Choreography**: **Twilight of the Warriors: Walled In** – **Kenji Tanigaki** ‡; Stuntman – Kong Tao Hai, Tommy Leung; The Last Dance – Jack Wong Wai Leung; Cesium Fallout – Jack Wong Wai Leung; The Prosecutor – Takahito Ouchi	**Professional Achievement**: **Jiang Xiaoliang**; **Han Dongqing**
**Lifetime Achievement**: **Tsui Hark**; **Nansun Shi**

== See also ==
- 61st Golden Horse Awards
- 37th Golden Rooster Awards
- 18th Asian Film Awards
