= Natalie Hsu =

Hong Kong actress (born 2004)

- 許恩怡
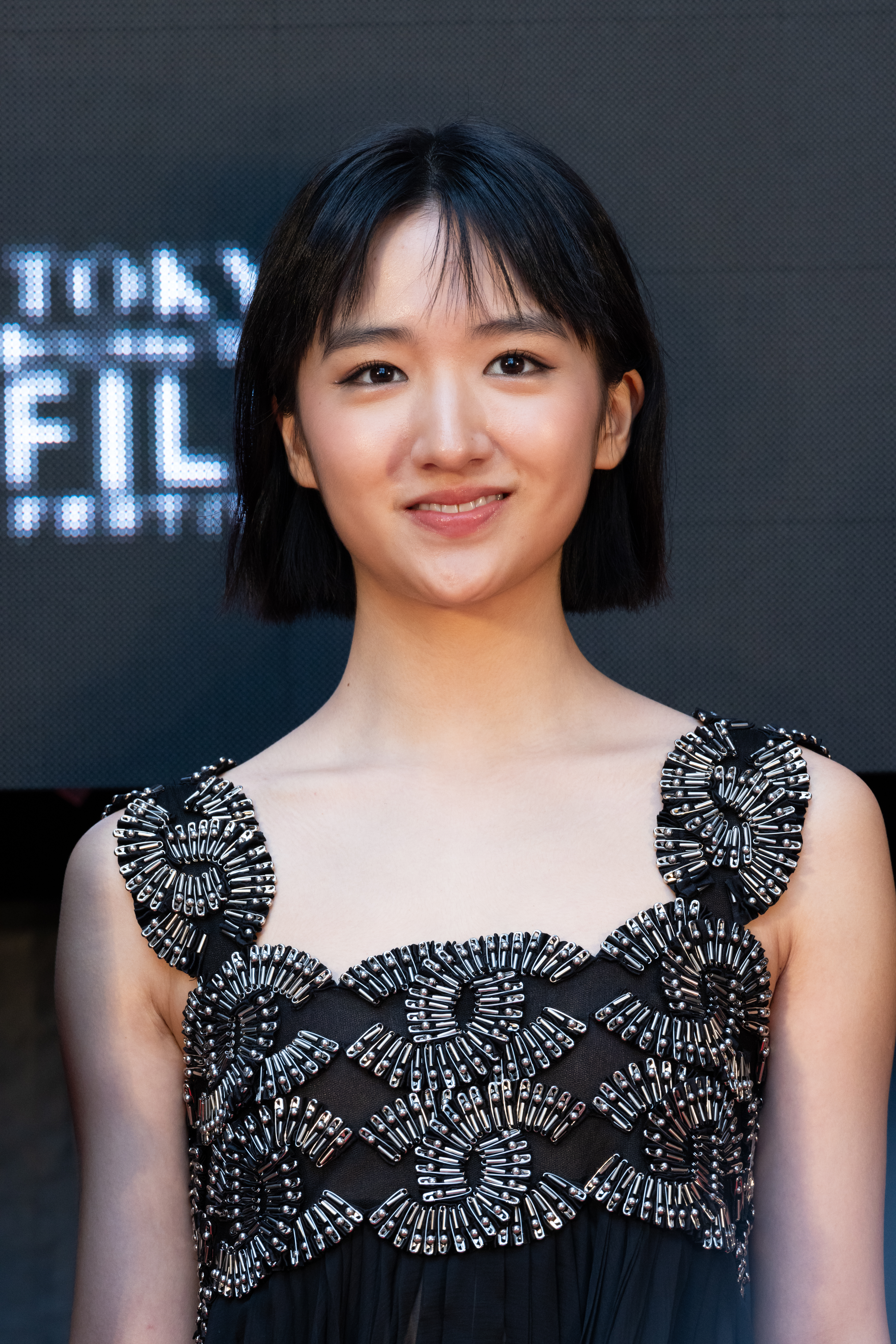
- Hsu at the 2024 TIFF
- Born: Hsu En-yi; 2004 (age 21–22); Hong Kong
- Education: Independent Schools Foundation Academy
- Occupation: Actress
- Years active: 2021–present
- Family: Ann Bridgewater (mother)

Natalie Hsu En-yi (Chinese: 許恩怡; born 2004) is a Hong Kong actress who made her debut as a child actor and gained recognition for her roles in Fly Me to the Moon (2023), Last Song for You, and Pavane for an Infant (both 2024). She was nominated for Best Actress in the 43rd Hong Kong Film Awards with Last Song for You.

== Early life ==
Hsu was born in 2004. She is the daughter of retired actress and occupational therapist Ann Bridgewater. She started learning classical dance, ballet, and modern dance at the age of three, completing examinations for all grades at the Royal Academy of Dance. She discovered her mother's profession as an actress only until she turned ten, and albeit joining the drama club at school, she initially had no intention of becoming an actress herself. Hsu pursued her education at Independent Schools Foundation Academy, where she took theatre studies in the International Baccalaureate curriculum.

== Career ==
In the summer of 2020, Hsu received a message from Kim Chou, an artist agent and a friend of her mother, that director Zhang Yibai was seeking a schoolgirl actress with a dancing background for his latest feature film project The Day We Lit Up the Sky, and invited Hsu to have a chat. A day after a casual video call, Hsu was confirmed for the role. In the film, she portrayed Wong, a schoolgirl with dreams of becoming a dancer. Her performance earned her Best Newcomer in the 4th Golden Crane Awards presented on the Chinese Japan International Festival the following year. Hsu also appeared in several music videos, including Leo Ku and Edan Lui's "Floating Classroom". In 2023, Hsu played the role of Ling, the daughter of Isabella Leung's character, in the action thriller film Bursting Point, directed by Dante Lam.

In 2024, Hsu took on the role of Lam Tsz Kuet, the younger version of Angela Yuen's character, in the film Fly Me to the Moon. The character is a Hunanese girl who migrates to Hong Kong and faces discrimination and family issues. Hsu also starred in a lead role as Summer, a girl who time travelled to meet the future version of her childhood love (played by Ekin Cheng) in the romance film Last Song for You, for which she was nominated for Best Actress in the 43rd Hong Kong Film Awards. Also in 2024, she starred in Cesium fallout, and in 2025, in My First of May., Peg O' My Heart, Pavane for an Infant, and Measure in Love. She also had leading roles in Mother Bhumi and Girlfriends.

== Filmography ==
=== Film ===
Year	Title	Role	Notes/Ref.
2021	The Day We Lit Up the Sky	Wong (小黃)	
2023	Fly Me to the Moon	Lam Tsz Kuet (林子缺)	
2023	Bursting Point	Cheng Yuk Ling (鄭玉玲)	
2024	Cesium Fallout	Eileen Fan (范藹林)	
2024	Last Song for You	Summer	
2024	Peg O' My Heart	Yi (阿怡)	Cameo
2024	Pavane for an Infant	Siew Man (小曼)	
2025	Girlfriends	Yan	
2025	Mother Bhumi	Boon (阿雯)	
2025	My First of May	Tang Chi (鄧辭)	

== Awards and nominations ==
Year	Award	Category	Work	Result	Ref.
2021	4th Golden Crane Awards	Best Newcomer	The Day We Lit Up the Sky	Won	
2025	43rd Hong Kong Film Awards	Best Actress	Last Song for You	Nominated	
2025	24th New York Asian Film Festival	Screen International Rising Star Asia Award	New generation of Hong Kong talent	Won	
