= Suk Suk =

2019 Hong Kong film by Ray Yeung

- Theatrical release poster
- Chinese: 叔．叔
- Directed by: Ray Yeung
- Written by: Ray Yeung
- Produced by: Michael J. Werner; Teresa Kwong; Sandy Yip; Chowee Leow; Stan Guingon
- Starring: Tai Bo; Ben Yuen; Patra Au
- Cinematography: Leung Ming Kai
- Edited by: William Chang; Nose Chan
- Music by: Veronica Lee
- Production company: New Voice Film Productions
- Release dates: October 4, 2019 (BIFF); February 27, 2020 (Taiwan); May 28, 2020 (Hong Kong)
- Running time: 92 minutes
- Country: Hong Kong
- Language: Cantonese

Suk Suk (Chinese: 叔．叔; lit. 'uncle'), also known as Twilight's Kiss, is a 2019 Hong Kong drama film written and directed by Ray Yeung. It presents the story of two closeted gay men in their twilight years who contemplate a possible future together after unexpectedly falling in love. The film was selected to compete in the Panorama section at the 70th Berlin International Film Festival.

== Synopsis ==
The film presents the story of two closeted married men in their twilight years. One day Pak (Tai Bo), a taxi driver who refuses to retire, meets Hoi (Ben Yuen), a retired single father, in a park. Despite years of societal and personal pressure, they are proud of the families they have created through hard work and determination. Yet in that brief initial encounter, something is unleashed in them which had been suppressed for so many years. As both men recount and recall their personal histories, they also contemplate a possible future together.

== Cast ==
- Tai Bo as Pak
- Ben Yuen as Hoi
- Patra Au Ga Man as Ching
- Lo Chun Yip as Wan
- Kong To as Chiu
- Lam Yiu-sing as Edmond
- Wong Hiu Yee as Fong
- Hu Yixin as Zheng
- Lau Ting Kwan as Joyce
- Shmily as Dior

== Release ==
- Suk Suk had its world premiere at the 24th Busan International Film Festival on 4 October 2019.
- Suk Suk was released in Taiwan by Cai Chang International in February 2020
- Suk Suk was released in Hong Kong by Golden Scene Company Ltd. in May 2020
- Suk Suk was released in Thailand by M Pictures / Never So Small in July 2020
- The Hong Kong Economic and Trade Office in Brussels (HKETO, Brussels) and Create Hong Kong have jointly supported the participation of three Hong Kong films at the CinemAsia Film Festival 2020 in Amsterdam, the Netherlands, being held from March 4 to 8 (Amsterdam time). One of the three Hong Kong films is Suk Suk.
- Suk Suk was released in North America by Strand Releasing in February 2021.
- Suk Suk was released in France by Epicentre Filmes in June 2021.
- Suk Suk was released in Spain by Vitrine Filmes in July 2021
- Suk Suk was released in Brazil by Vitrine Filmes in September 2021

The original title "Suk Suk" was changed to "Twilight's Kiss" for USA and Canada by North American distributor Strand Releasing.

The original title "Suk Suk" was changed to "Un Printemps à Hong Kong" for France by French distributor Epicentre Films.

The original title "Suk Suk" was changed to "Suk Suk - Um Amor em Segredo" for Brazil by Brazilian distributor Vitrine Filmes

The film was showcased in 'LGBTQ+ Visions & Horizon: Queer Unbound at NYAFF' at the 23rd New York Asian Film Festival on July 14, 2024.

== Reception ==
Review aggregator Rotten Tomatoes gives the film a 100% approval rating based on 20 reviews, with an average rating of 7.6/10. According to Metacritic, which sampled six critics and calculated a weighted average score of 71 out of 100, the film received "generally favorable reviews".

Elizabeth Kerr from The Hollywood Reporter describes Suk Suk as Ray Yeung's "most accomplished, mature film to date, and Yeung demonstrates a keen eye for the social dynamics that impact us and how we respond to them, and finds space to bask in the simple pleasures, basic generosity and the safety net that is family while simultaneously dealing with homophobia, ageism and faith." Wendy Ide from Screen Daily described Suk Suk as "a gentle, understated storytelling with subtly observant camerawork to match". Zhuo-Ning Su from The Film Stage writes, "In lucid, carefully non-judgmental strokes, Yeung recreates the easy familiarity of (hetero-normative) family life that both men have gotten used to." Sight & Sound indicates, "Suk Suk is a loving, considerate tale of queer love in later life. Elaborating an affair between two elderly men in present-day Hong Kong, Ray Yeung proves himself as an astute observer of human affection and social obligation in his third feature film." Alissa Simon from Variety describes, "Strong performances by veterans Tai Bo and Ben Yuen make the protagonists' struggle concrete and affecting."

== Accolades ==
Award	Category	Recipient(s)	Result	Ref.
70th Berlin International Film Festival	Best Feature Film	Ray Yeung	Nominated	
56th Golden Horse Awards	Best Narrative Feature	Suk Suk	Nominated	
56th Golden Horse Awards	Best Original Screenplay	Ray Yeung	Nominated	
56th Golden Horse Awards	Best Leading Actor	Ben Yuen	Nominated	
56th Golden Horse Awards	Best Leading Actor	Tai Bo	Nominated	
56th Golden Horse Awards	Best Supporting Actress	Patra Au	Nominated	
Hong Kong Directors Guild Awards	Best Actor	Tai Bo	Won	
Hong Kong Screenwriters' Guild Awards	Best Screenplay	Ray Yeung	Won	
Hong Kong Screenwriters' Guild Awards	Best Role in a Screenplay	Tai Bo	Won	
Hong Kong Screenwriters' Guild Awards	Best Role in a Screenplay	Patra Au	Nominated	
Hong Kong Film Critics Society Awards	Best Film	Suk Suk	Won	
Hong Kong Film Critics Society Awards	Best Actor	Tai Bo	Won	
Hong Kong Film Critics Society Awards	Best Screenplay	Ray Yeung	Nominated	
Hong Kong Film Critics Society Awards	Best Director	Ray Yeung	Nominated	
Hong Kong Film Critics Society Awards	Best Actor	Ben Yuen	Nominated	
39th Hong Kong Film Awards	Best Actor	Tai Bo	Won	
39th Hong Kong Film Awards	Best Supporting Actress	Patra Au	Won	
39th Hong Kong Film Awards	Best Film	Suk Suk	Nominated	
39th Hong Kong Film Awards	Best Director	Ray Yeung	Nominated	
39th Hong Kong Film Awards	Best Screenplay	Ray Yeung	Nominated	
39th Hong Kong Film Awards	Best Supporting Actor	Lo Chun Yip	Nominated	
39th Hong Kong Film Awards	Best New Performer	Patra Au	Nominated	
39th Hong Kong Film Awards	Best Editing	William Chang & Nose Chui Hing Chan	Nominated	
39th Hong Kong Film Awards	Best Costume Make Up Design	Albert Poon	Nominated	
Renaissance Awards	Best Drama	Suk Suk	Won	
Kongest Film Awards	Best Film	Suk Suk	Won	
Kongest Film Awards	Best Actor	Ben Yuen	Nominated	
Wicked Queer Boston LGBT Film Festival	Jury Award: Best Narrative Feature	Twilight's Kiss	Won	
To Ten Chinese Films Festival	Youth Film Handbook: Outstanding Film	Twilight's Kiss	Won	
To Ten Chinese Films Festival	Youth Film Handbook: Best Actor	Ben Yuen	Won	
Out on Film: Atlanta's LGBT Film Festival	Jury Award: Best International Film	Twilight's Kiss	Won	
Out on Film: Atlanta's LGBT Film Festival	Jury Award: Best Actor	Tai Bo	Won	
Out on Film: Atlanta's LGBT Film Festival	Audience Award: Best International Film	Twilight's Kiss	Won	
Florence Queer Festival	Best Long Feature Film	Twilight's Kiss	Won	
Festival International du Film Independent de Bordeaux	Special Mention: Best Feature Film	Twilight's Kiss	Won	
GAZE Film Festival Dublin	Audience Award: Best Feature	Twilight's Kiss	Won	
Seoul International Pride Film Festival	Best Asian Feature	Twilight's Kiss	Won	
Madrid LGBTQ International Film Festival	Best Actor	Tai Bo	Won	
Madrid LGBTQ International Film Festival	Best Actor	Ben Yuen	Won	
Amiens International Film Festival	Special Mention: Best Actor	Tai Bo	Won	
Amiens International Film Festival	Special Mention: Best Actor	Ben Yeun	Won	
Asian Film Awards	Best Actor	Tai Bo	Nominated	
Asian Film Awards	Best Supporting Actor	Ben Yuen	Nominated	
Asian Film Awards	Best Supporting Actress	Patra Au	Nominated	
Asian American International Film Festival	Audience Choice Award: Best Narrative Film	Twilight's Kiss	Won	
Tel Aviv International LGBT Film Festival	Honorable Mention: Best Feature	Twilight's Kiss	Won	
Zinegoak Festival, Bilbao Spain	Special Mention: Best Feature Film	Suk Suk	Won	
La Mostra Internacional de Cinema de Gai i Lesbià FIRE!!	Audience Award: Best Feature	Suk Suk	Won	
LGBT Film Fest of the Niemeyer Center, Spain	Jury Award: Best Feature Film	Suk Suk	Won	
Santo Domingo OutFest - Festival Internacional de Cine GLBT	Jury Award: Best Film	Suk Suk	Won	
Santo Domingo OutFest - Festival Internacional de Cine GLBT	Jury Award: Best Screenplay	Suk Suk	Won	
Santo Domingo OutFest - Festival Internacional de Cine GLBT	Jury Award: Best Performance	Tai Bo	Won	
Queerties Awards 2022	Best Indie Movie	Twilight's Kiss	Nominated	
GLAAD Media Awards 2022	Outstanding Feature - Limited Release	Twilight's Kiss	Nominated	

== Soundtrack ==
Name	Performed by	Original Singer	Written by	Composed by
Gentle breeze and drizzle	Qing Shan	Liu lanxi	Lin gongxin	Lin gongxin
