= One More Chance (2023 film) =

2023 Hong Kong film by Anthony Pun

- Film poster
- Traditional Chinese: 別叫我“賭神”
- Simplified Chinese: 别叫我“赌神”
- Hanyu Pinyin: Bié Jiào Wǒ “Dǔ Shén”
- Jyutping: Bit6 Giu3 Ngo2 "Dou2 San4"
- Directed by: Anthony Pun
- Written by: Felix Chong
- Produced by: Ronald Wong
- Starring: Chow Yun-fat; Anita Yuen; Alex Fong; Liu Kai-chi; Andy On; Kenny Wong; Michael Ning; Calvin Choy; Amy Lo; Will Or
- Cinematography: Tam Wan-kai
- Edited by: Curran Pang
- Music by: Hatano Yusuke; Day Tai
- Production companies: Bona Film Group; Zinnia Pictures; Sil-Metropole Organisation; Alibaba Pictures; Shanghai Bona Culture Media; Bona Entertainment Company; 2898 Limited
- Distributed by: Distribution Workshop; A Really Happy Film
- Release date: 29 June 2023
- Country: Hong Kong
- Language: Cantonese
- Budget: US$40 million
- Box office: US$7.7 million (Note: See Box office)

One More Chance (Chinese: 別叫我"賭神"; lit. 'Don't Call Me the "God of Gamblers'), formerly known as Be Water, My Friend (Chinese: 驕陽歲月), is a 2023 Hong Kong comedy-drama film directed by Anthony Pun and starring Chow Yun-fat as a pathological gambler who searches a way to communicate and connect with his autistic son. The film's former English title was based on Bruce Lee's quote on martial arts philosophy. Production for the film began in January 2019 and wrapped up in late March of the same year.

One More Chance was theatrically released on 29 June 2023.

== Plot ==
Fai, a compulsive gambler and an irresponsible man, is asked to take care of his ex-girlfriend Chik's son, Yeung. Chik also reveals to Fai that Yeung is his son, and promises to pay him HK$100,000, so Fai agrees to be a father for one month.

Soon, Fai notices his son has autism and gets to understand the difficulties of raising a child with special needs. When Chik fails to show up on the date when they agreed to meet, Fai realises why she brought him his child.

He finds his life goal while discovering Yeung's talent on the racing field, then decides to give up his former dissipated life and to accompany his son as he sets out to achieve his dream.

== Cast ==
- Chow Yun-fat as Ng Kwong-fai (吹水輝), a compulsive gambler.
- Anita Yuen as Lee Chik (李夕), Fai's ex-girlfriend.
- Alex Fong as Fong Sir
- Liu Kai-chi as Fa Suk
- Andy On as Boss Seui
- Kenny Wong as Tai Ji Kei
- Michael Ning as Fei Gau
- Calvin Choi as Tart
- Amy Lo as Angelina
- Will Or as Lee Yeung (李陽), Fai and Chik's son.

== Production ==
With a budget of US$40 million, One More Chance was shot on location in Hong Kong, Macau and China.

On 7 March 2019, Chow suffered from an injury on set while filming a scene where he was threatened by co-star Kenny Wong who played a debt collector with a hairspray bottle on hand. In the scene, Wong was preparing to toss the hairspray bottle from his left hand to his right, but the cover of the bottle popped off and struck Chow on his forehead. Despite his forehead bleeding, Chow continued filming the scene. Originally wanting to continue the shoot for the rest of the day, director Anthony Pun and action director Nicky Li eventually advised him to seek treatment at the hospital, where he received five stitches.

== Release ==
One More Chance was theatrically released in Hong Kong on 29 June 2023.

It was invited to the 28th Busan International Film Festival in the Open Cinema section and was screened on 5 October 2023.

== Box office ==
One More Chance grossed a total of $7,697,682 worldwide, combining its box office gross from Hong Kong (US$1,647,313), mainland China (US$5,970,000), South Korea (US$62,738), Australia (US$13,947), and United Kingdom (US$3,684).

One More Chance debuted at No. 2 during its opening weekend in Hong Kong, grossing HK$4,430,879 (US$565,415) after its first four days of release and bringing in a total of HK$4,532,059 (US$578,326) including preview screenings. The film grossed HK$4,216,896 (US$538,728) in its second weekend, coming at No. 4, while having grossed a total of HK$8,749,065 (US$1,117,734) by then. The film remained at No. 4 during its third weekend grossing HK$2,286,311 (US$292,557), while having accumulated a total gross of HK$11,035,376 (US$1,412,094) by then. In its fourth weekend, the film grossed HK$1,357,907 (US$173,703) coming in at No. 5, and has grossed a total of HK$12,393,283 (US$1,585,345) by then. The film fell down to No. 10 during its fifth weekend grossing HK$450,490 (US$57,778), while accumulating a total gross of HK$12,843,773 (US$1,647,313) so far.

== See also ==
- Chow Yun-fat filmography
