= All Shall Be Well (film) =

2024 Hong Kong film by Ray Yeung

- Festival release poster
- Traditional Chinese: 從今以後
- Literal meaning: From Now On
- Jyutping: Cung^{4} Gam^{1} Ji^{5} Hau^{6}
- Directed by: Ray Yeung
- Written by: Ray Yeung
- Produced by: Michael J. Werner; Teresa Kwong; Sandy Yip; Chowee Leow; Stan Guingon
- Starring: Patra Au; Maggie Li Lin Lin
- Cinematography: Leung Ming Kai
- Edited by: William Chang; Lai Kwun Tung
- Music by: Veronica Lee
- Production company: New Voice Film Productions
- Distributed by: Golden Scene (Hong Kong); Films Boutique (International)
- Release date: 16 February 2024 (Berlinale)
- Running time: 93 minutes
- Country: Hong Kong
- Language: Cantonese

All Shall Be Well (Chinese: 從今以後) is a 2024 Hong Kong drama film, written and directed by Ray Yeung, starring Patra Au and Maggie Li Lin Lin. The film initially revolves around Angie and Pat, a well-off lesbian couple in their mid-60s, but the story ultimately explores family dynamics after the sudden death of Pat.

It had its premiere in the Panorama section at the 74th Berlin International Film Festival on 16 February 2024. The film won the Teddy Award for best LGBTQ-themed feature film, and 3rd place in Panorama Audience Award for Best Feature Film.

== Synopsis ==
Angie and Pat are a wealthy lesbian couple in their 60s who have been in a happy relationship for the last 30 years, and live together in Pat's flat in Hong Kong. Their friends and relatives respect and adore their relationship. One night, when Pat suddenly passes away, Angie receives comfort from her friends and initially from Pat's family as well. But soon, disputes over Pat's funeral and estate cause a rift between them. Angie has no legal claim to the flat and depends on the fading kindness of Pat's family. Pat was the one who handled everything in their relationship, even though they split the costs equally. With the help of her chosen family, Angie starts a journey of self-reliance in her later years.

== Cast ==
- Patra Au as Angie
- Maggie Li Lin Lin as Pat
- Tai Bo (張嘉年) as Shing
- Leung Chung-hang as Victor
- Fish Liew as Fanny
- Hui So Ying as Mei
- Rachel Leung as Kitty
- Luna Shaw as Yvonne

== Release ==
All Shall Be Well had its world premiere on 16 February 2024, as part of the 74th Berlin International Film Festival, in Panorama.

In December 2023, Berlin-based company Films Boutique has acquired the sales rights of the film prior to its Berlinale premiere.

The film opened the 48th Hong Kong International Film Festival on 28 March 2024. It had its Canadian premiere at the Inside Out Film and Video Festival on 26 May 2024.

The film was featured in Features section of the 71st Sydney Film Festival on June 6, 2024.

The film was showcased in 'LGBTQ+ Visions & Horizon: Queer Unbound at NYAFF' at the 23rd New York Asian Film Festival on July 13, 2024. It was also presented in 'Strands: Love' section of the 2024 BFI London Film Festival on 10 October 2024.

The film was selected in the Standpoint section of the 35th Singapore International Film Festival and was screened on 29 November 2024.

== Reception ==
On the review aggregator website Rotten Tomatoes, 100% of 23 critics' reviews are positive, with an average rating of 7.9/10. Metacritic, which uses a weighted average, assigned the film a score of 82 out of 100, based on 8 critics, indicating "universal acclaim".

Josh Slater-Williams of IndieWire reviewing at Berlinale graded the film A and wrote, "[the] deeply moving fourth feature from writer-director Ray Yeung tenderly explores the aftermath of unexpected loss, where the uncertainty and chaos of the immediate grieving period is compounded by delicate negotiations that need addressing amid a very specific set of circumstances."

Clotilde Chinnici writing in Loud And Clear Reviews rated the film with four stars and said, "If there is a film that could capture this same feeling of this mundane and yet world-shattering grief, it is this one. All Shall Be Well will break your heart for its entire 90-minute runtime, but by the end of it, we realise it is all worth it."

Paul Heath of The Hollywood News reviewing at Berlinale rated the film with 4 stars and wrote, "Beautifully told and superbly acted, All Shall Be Well is an involving, very sad drama that is a standout at this year’s Berlinale Panorama strand."

Olivia Popp of Asian Movie Pulse states, "Yeung's latest feature is generous but never indulgent, taking the approachable genre of the family drama and placing it in the context of topical issues in today's queer Hong Kong...Between sequences, Yeung interjects towering Hong Kong highrises shot from below, the city both a haven for the couple — where street market stall owners happily recognize them — as well as a threatening source of the unknown."

== Accolades ==
Award	Date	Category	Recipient	Result	Ref.
Berlin International Film Festival	25 February 2024	Panorama Audience Award for Best Feature Film	Ray Yeung	3	
Berlin International Film Festival	25 February 2024	Teddy Award for Best Feature Film	Ray Yeung	Won	
Frameline Film Festival	29 June 2024	Comcast Audience Award for Narrative Feature	All Shall Be Well	Won	
FilmOut San Diego	12–15 September 2024	Best Actress	Patra Au	Won	
FilmOut San Diego	12–15 September 2024	Best Supporting Actress	Maggie Li Lin Lin	Won	
Festival International du Film LGBTQIA+ de Grenoble	6 October 2024	Jury Prize Best Feature Film	All Shall Be Well	Won	
Rio de Janeiro International Film Festival	13 October 2024	Felix Award for Best International Feature	All Shall Be Well	Won	
Utah Queer Film Festival	25–27 October 2024	Narrative Audience Award	All Shall Be Well	Won	
MIX Copenhagen	27 October 2024	Lili Award for Best Feature	All Shall Be Well	Won	
Thessaloniki International Film Festival	10 November 2024	Mermaid Award for Best LGBTQAI+ Film	All Shall Be Well	Won	
Golden Horse Awards	23 November 2024	Best Narrative Feature	All Shall Be Well	Nominated	
Golden Horse Awards	23 November 2024	Best Director	Ray Yeung	Nominated	
Golden Horse Awards	23 November 2024	Best Leading Actress	Patra Au	Nominated	
Golden Horse Awards	23 November 2024	Best Film Editing	William Chang, Lai Kwun-tung	Nominated	
Hong Kong Film Critics Society Awards	13 January 2025	Film of Merit	All Shall Be Well	Won	
Dorian Awards	13 February 2025	Non-English Language LGBTQ Film of the Year	All Shall Be Well	Nominated	
Asian Film Awards	16 March 2025	Best Supporting Actress	Maggie Li Lin Lin	Nominated	
Hong Kong Film Awards	27 April 2025	Best Film	All Shall Be Well	Nominated	
Hong Kong Film Awards	27 April 2025	Best Director	Ray Yeung	Nominated	
Hong Kong Film Awards	27 April 2025	Best Screenplay	Ray Yeung	Nominated	
Hong Kong Film Awards	27 April 2025	Best Actress	Patra Au	Nominated	
Hong Kong Film Awards	27 April 2025	Best Supporting Actress	Maggie Li Lin Lin	Nominated	
