= Rosa Maria Velasco =

Hong Kong actress (born 1983)

- 韋羅莎
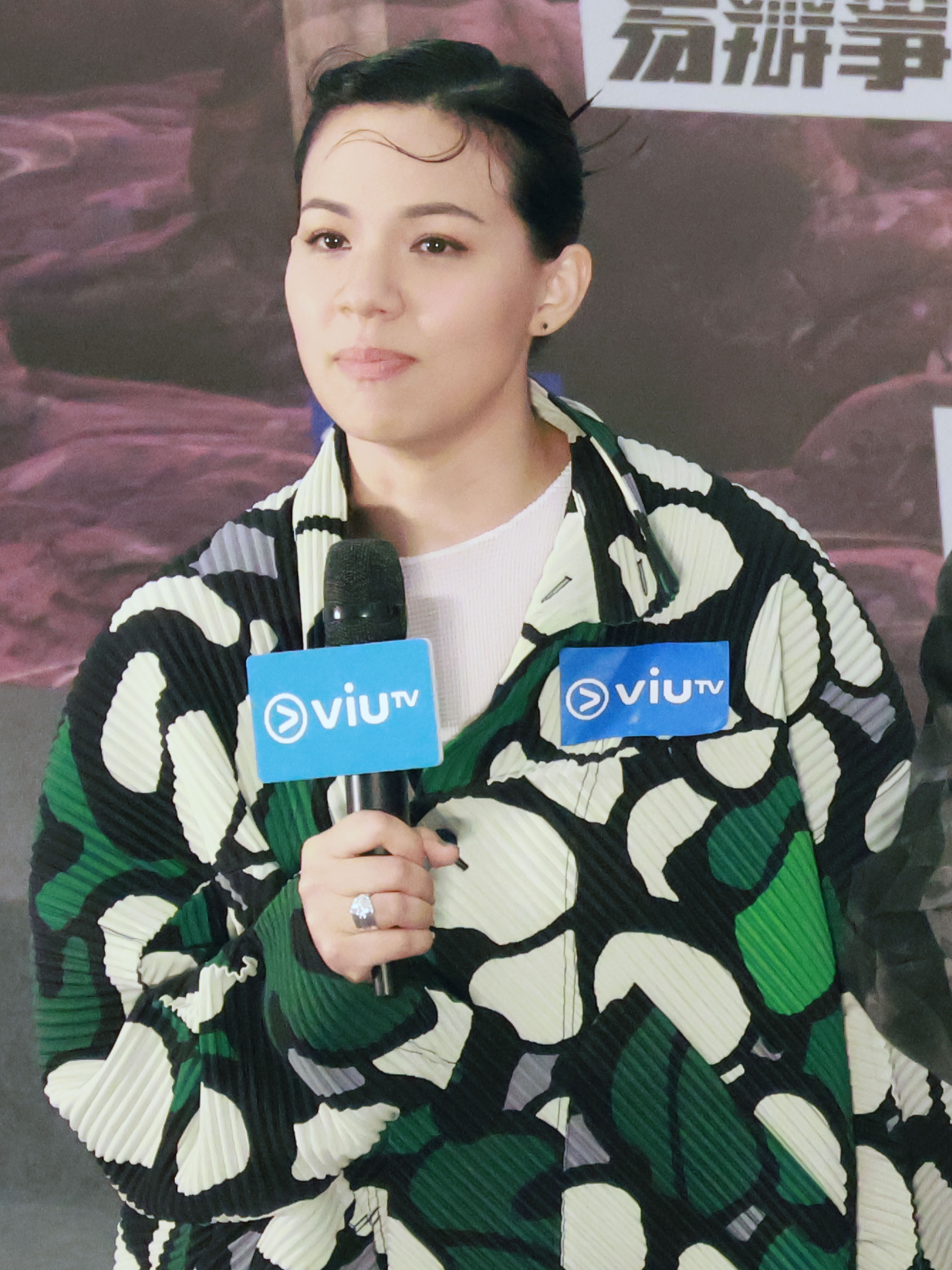
- Velasco in May 2023
- Born: Rosa Maria Velasco; 12 March 1983 (age 43); Taiwan
- Education: Hong Kong Academy for Performing Arts (BFA)
- Occupation: Actress
- Years active: 2006–present
- Spouse: German Cheung (m. 2001)
- Children: 1

Rosa Maria Velasco (Chinese: 韋羅莎; born 12 March 1983) is a Hong Kong actress. She was nominated for Best Supporting Actress twice in the 42nd and 43rd Hong Kong Film Awards with Time Still Turns the Pages (2023) and The Last Dance (2024).

== Biography ==
Velasco was born on 12 March 1983, in Taiwan, to a Spanish father and Taiwanese mother. She grew up in Hong Kong and attended the Hong Kong Academy for Performing Arts to study acting. After graduating with first class honours in 2007, Velasco turned down an offer from television and joined the Hong Kong Repertory Theatre to feature in stage plays. Velasco received her first role in the play Trojan Woman and was nominated for the Best Supporting Actress in the Hong Kong Drama Awards. She later also appeared in the 2019 stage play No News Is True News and won Best Actress in the Hong Kong Drama Awards with the role.

In 2023, Velasco was cast in the lead role alongside Endy Chow and Peter Chan in the comedy film Everyphone Everywhere. She also starred in the featured film Time Still Turns the Pages in the same year, portraying a long-suffering mother of an abusive husband. She was nominated for Best Supporting Actress in the Hong Kong Film Awards for the role.

== Personal life ==
Velasco married stage actor German Cheung Ming Yiu in 2001. They gave birth to a daughter, Mia, in 2021.

== Filmography ==
=== Film ===
Year	Title	Role	Notes/Ref.
2016	Heaven in the Dark	Susanna	
2017	77 Heartbreaks	Client A	
2017	Zombiology: Enjoy Yourself Tonight	Push-pin's mother	
2021	Anita	Carol Cheng	
2023	Everyphone Everywhere	Ana	
2023	Time Still Turns the Pages	Heidi Cheng	
2023	Ready or Rot	Samantha	
2024	Crisis Negotiators	Hoi Lam (凱琳)	
2024	The Last Dance	Miss Yan (甄小姐)	
2025	Sons of the Neon Night		

== Awards and nominations ==
Year	Award	Category	Work	Result	Ref.
2006	15th Hong Kong Drama Awards	Best Supporting Actress (Tragedy/Drama)	Trojan Woman	Nominated	
2010	19th Hong Kong Drama Awards	Best Actress (Comedy/Farce)	MircoSex Office, Caligula, Writing in Water, A Flea in Her Ear	Nominated	
2013	22nd Hong Kong Drama Awards	Best Supporting Actress (Tragedy/Drama)	Open Relationship	Nominated	
2014	23rd Hong Kong Drama Awards	Best Supporting Actress (Comedy/Farce)	The Mixed Doubles	Won	
2015	24th Hong Kong Drama Awards	Best Actress (Comedy/Farce)	Black Monday	Won	
2017	26th Hong Kong Drama Awards	Best Actress (Comedy/Farce)	MircoSex Office, Caligula, Writing in Water, A Flea in Her Ear	Nominated	
2017	26th Hong Kong Drama Awards	Best Actress (Tragedy/Drama)	Macbeth	Nominated	
2019	28th Hong Kong Drama Awards	Best Actress (Tragedy/Drama)	No News Is True News	Won	
2024	42nd Hong Kong Film Awards	Best Supporting Actress	Time Still Turns the Pages	Nominated	
2025	43rd Hong Kong Film Awards	Best Supporting Actress	The Last Dance	Nominated	
