= Divergence (film) =

2005 Hong Kong film by Benny Chan

- Theatrical poster in Mandarin
- Traditional Chinese: 三岔口
- Simplified Chinese: 三岔口
- Hanyu Pinyin: Sān Chà Kǒu
- Jyutping: Saam1 Caa1 Hau2
- Directed by: Benny Chan
- Written by: Ivy Ho
- Produced by: Benny Chan
- Starring: Aaron Kwok; Ekin Cheng; Daniel Wu
- Cinematography: Anthony Pun
- Edited by: Yau Chi-wai
- Music by: Anthony Chue
- Production company: Universe Entertainment
- Distributed by: Universe Films Distribution Co. Ltd.
- Release date: 28 April 2005
- Running time: 101 minutes
- Country: Hong Kong
- Languages: Cantonese; Mandarin
- Box office: HK$6,349,209

Divergence is a 2005 Hong Kong action film directed and produced by Benny Chan, from a screenplay by Ivy Ho. The film stars Aaron Kwok, Ekin Cheng and Daniel Wu.

== Plot ==
Three people - a cop, a lawyer and a killer - cross paths after the murder of a federal witness and a kidnapping of a pop star.

CID Suen Siu-yan (Aaron Kwok) arrests the accountant of a money launderer. However, the accountant is assassinated upon his arrival in the Hong Kong airport. The killer Coke (Daniel Wu) escapes without leaving any clues. While the masterminded laundry head (Gallen Lo) is happy about the soon resumption of his frozen assets for the death of his unfavorable witness, his fond son Xia is kidnapped suddenly.

Suen is an ill-fated CID. He can't forget his loving girlfriend (Angelica Lee) who disappeared 10 years ago and has not yet been found. During investigation, he finds a woman (Angelica Lee) who looks very much alike with his missing girlfriend. The woman is married to the lawyer To (Ekin Cheng) who represents the laundry head. It raises his interest in the couple.

Although the killer Coke has completed his job, he can't help feeling great interest in the case and it violates the code of killers. He does it because years ago Suen was the host of the Police Call which leave him great impression. And he knows why Suen's girlfriend disappeared 10 years ago.

The lawyer To is very successful in his field. He always wins cases in the court and helps the suspects escape from prison terms. Will there be a hidden side for an arrogant person like him? Everyone in the story seems to possess some qualities that don't suit their identity. Will it engulf them into the whirlpool?

Simultaneously, there are many other crimes around the city. Unknown motivated murders and disappearances are plentiful. Will the cases related to the 3 characters of the story?

== Cast ==
- Aaron Kwok as Suen Siu-yan
- Ekin Cheng as To Hou-san
- Daniel Wu as Koo/Coke
- Gallen Lo as Yiu Tin-chung
- Angelica Lee as Siu-fong / Amy
- Ning Jing as Ting
- Eric Tsang as Uncle Choi
- Yu Rongguang as Inspector Mok
- Tommy Yuen as Yiu Ha
- Samuel Pang as So Fu-on
- Jan Lamb as Detective Chu
- Sam Lee as Leung Tak
- Lam Suet as Mou Wai-bun

== Awards and nominations ==
Awards and nominations
Ceremony	Category	Recipient	Outcome
42nd Golden Horse Awards
42nd Golden Horse Awards	Best Actor	Aaron Kwok	Won
42nd Golden Horse Awards	Best Cinematography	Anthony Pun	Won
42nd Golden Horse Awards	Best Film Editing	Yau Chi-wai	Won
42nd Golden Horse Awards	Best Original Film Score	Anthony Chue	Nominated
25th Hong Kong Film Awards
25th Hong Kong Film Awards	Best Actor	Aaron Kwok	Nominated
25th Hong Kong Film Awards	Best Film Editing	Yau Chi-wai	Won
25th Hong Kong Film Awards	Best Action Choreography	Lee Chung-chi	Nominated
