= Four Trails =

2023 Hong Kong film by Robin Lee

- Chinese: 香港四徑大步走
- Directed by: Robin Lee
- Produced by: Ben Lee; Allison Friedman
- Starring: Andre Blumberg; Stone Tsang; Salomon Wettstein; Law Kai-pong; Will Hayward; Jacky Leung; Hyun Chan Chung; Sarah Pemberton; Nikki Han; Tom Robertshaw
- Production company: Lost Atlas Productions
- Distributed by: Edko Films
- Release dates: October 2023 (Hong Kong Asian Film Festival); 2 January 2025 (Hong Kong)
- Running time: 101 minutes
- Country: Hong Kong
- Languages: English; Cantonese
- Box office: HKD$10 million (Hong Kong)

Four Trails (Chinese: 香港四徑大步走) is a 2023 Hong Kong documentary film directed by Robin Lee. Starring Andre Blumberg, Stone Tsang, Salomon Wettstein, Law Kai-pong, Will Hayward, Jacky Leung, Hyun Chan Chung, Sarah Pemberton, Nikki Han and Tom Robertshaw, it records the story of these challengers in 2021 who attempted to finish the 298-km mountain running within 60 hours. Lee won Best New Director in the 43rd Hong Kong Film Awards with the film.

== Synopsis ==
Founded by Andre Blumberg, a German expat in Hong Kong in 2012, the Hong Kong Four Trails Ultra Challenge is considered the most overwhelming race in the city. It requires strong contenders to finish four major hiking trails, MacLehose, Wilson, Hong Kong, and Lantau, spaning a total distance of 298 kilometres with a cumulative elevation of 14,500 metres. Contenders need to finish within 60 hours in order to claim the title of "finisher", and 72 hours for "survivor". As the challenge approaches its tenth edition and amidst the coronavirus pandemic, Blumberg only invited finishers and survivors in the past races to challenge themselves once again. Eventually, eighteen signed up for the ultramarathon which began on 12 February.

Stone Tsang Siu-keung, legendary trail runner in Hong Kong, aimed to achieve the "breaking 50" title and finished the race in under 50 hours. Two other ex-finisher Tom Robertshaw, the record holder of the race, and Salomon Wettstein, a co-CEO of a tech powerhouse, also wished to break the barrier. Other contenders include Law Kai-pong, who suffered a major injury 3 weeks before the challenge; Will Hayward, Dean of Social Sciences at University of Hong Kong; Jacky Leung Chun-keung, past finisher in 2020; Korean-Spanish Hyun Chan Chung; Sarah Pemberton, the youngest participant joining for the record fourth time; and Nikki Han, first female finisher of the challenge.

Tsang and Robertshaw were forced to withdraw from the race due to knee injuries and stomachache. Pemberton also chose not to continue with huge discomfort. Wettstein attempted to give up after running behind the schedule but decided to go ahead with the encouragement from others. Sleep-deprived Hayward and Law battled hallucination and worsened wound respectively, while others faced different challenges as well. At last, Leung, finishing in 58.5 hours at 2020 edition, unexpectedly made history and attained the historic "breaking 50" honour with 49 hours and 26 minutes.

=== Challenge results ===
The results of those starred in the documentary are as follows:

- Jacky Leung: 49 hours and 26 minutes
- Salomon Wettstein: 51 hours and 53 minutes
- Hyun Chang Chung: 59 hours and 23 minutes
- Nikki Han: 59 hours and 42 minutes
- Law Kai-pong: 62 hours
- Will Hayward: 66 hours and 59 minutes
- Tom Robertshaw: withdrew after 34 hours and 34 minutes
- Stone Tsang: withdrew after 28 hours and 1 minute
- Sarah Pemberton: withdrew after 16 hours and 10 minutes

== Production ==
The film was directed by Robin Lee, British director born and bred in Hong Kong, who previously filmed the 2017 race and made it into a video, Breaking 60. First invited by Blumberg to shoot Breaking 50 as a sequel, Lee decided instead to cover the stories of other survivors as well which symbolise self-challenge. He approached the 18 runners six months before the race and interviewed those who would become the major faces in the documentary. The team of 12 cameramen, including Lee who hiked 70 km with the 20-kg equipment for three days without sleep, spent hours at various locations, capturing the moments of different runners.

With a total of 200 hours of footages and the lack of funding, it took two years for Robin and his brother Ben for post-production.

== Release ==
Four Trails premiered at the 2023 Hong Kong Asian Film Festival. The documentary was officially released on 2 January 2025 after a premiere on 6 December 2024.

== Reception ==
As of early April 2025, the film has grossed more than HKD$10 million at the box office.

Paul McNamara of South China Morning Post praised the documentary with beautiful footage that "shines a spotlight on the jaw-dropping scenery and wide-open spaces which mark Hong Kong as a go-to destination for ultra-runners and endurance athletes". Yau Tai-tong, writing for am730, commended the film as an emotionally powerful documentary that vividly captures the challenges of the ultra-marathon, evoking deep reflections on personal perseverance and the human spirit.

Ngan Ming-fai of HK01 considered the film a compelling documentary that not only showcases the intense challenges of the Ultra Challenge but also highlights the vibrant and passionate culture of trail running in Hong Kong, aiming to inspire a broader recognition of this unique community. Ho Siu-bun, also reviewing for am730, acknowledged the documentary for effectively capturing the grueling nature of the ultra-marathon and the emotional journeys of its participants, ultimately prompting viewers to reflect on the motivations behind such extreme challenges.

== Awards and nominations ==
Year	Award	Category	Nominee	Result	Ref.
2025	43rd Hong Kong Film Awards	Best Editing	Robin Lee	Nominated	
2025	43rd Hong Kong Film Awards	Best New Director	Robin Lee	Won	
