= The Last Dance (2024 film) =

2024 Hong Kong film by Anselm Chan

- Theatrical release poster
- Traditional Chinese: 破·地獄
- Jyutping: Po^{3} Dei^{6} Juk^{6}
- Directed by: Anselm Chan
- Screenplay by: Anselm Chan; Cheng Wai-kei
- Produced by: Anselm Chan; Jason Siu; Chan Sing-yan
- Starring: Dayo Wong; Michael Hui; Michelle Wai; Chu Pak Hong
- Cinematography: Anthony Pun
- Edited by: William Chang; Curran Pang
- Music by: Chu Wan-pin
- Production companies: Emperor Motion Pictures; Alibaba Pictures; AMTD Digital
- Distributed by: Emperor Motion Pictures
- Release dates: 11 October 2024 (HIFF); 9 November 2024 (Hong Kong)
- Running time: 127 minutes 140 minutes (Director's cut)
- Country: Hong Kong
- Language: Cantonese

The Last Dance (Chinese: 破·地獄) is a 2024 Hong Kong drama film directed and written by Anselm Chan. Starring Dayo Wong, Michael Hui, Michelle Wai, and Chu Pak Hong, the film explores themes related to Hong Kong's deathcare and follows a wedding planner (Wong) who enters the funeral industry through a partnership with a traditional Taoist priest (Hui), seeking to understand the meaning of life and death through funeral rituals.

Marking the third feature film as a director, Anselm Chan transitioned from comedy to drama after conceiving the story during the COVID-19 pandemic. He began writing the screenplay in 2022 while filming Ready or Rot (2023), with principal photography taking place from January to March 2024. The film was shot on location at the Tung Wah Coffin Home and the International Funeral Parlour, marking the first time these venues have opened to the public for filming.

The film had its world premiere on 11 October 2024 at the 44th Hawaii International Film Festival, followed by a theatrical release in Hong Kong on 9 November. The film broke numerous box office records, grossing over HK$122 million as of early December, making it the highest-grossing domestic film of all time in Hong Kong. The film was selected as Hong Kong's official entry for Best International Feature Film at the 98th Academy Awards, but it was not nominated.

== Plot ==
Dominic, a wedding planner, faces financial struggles during the pandemic lockdown and decides to change careers. He takes over his girlfriend Jade's retiring uncle's funeral parlour and meets Master Man, a Taoist priest who performs the traditional funeral ritual "Break Hell's Gate". Initially skeptical of Dominic's dedication to the funeral business, Man is antagonistic. To ease tensions, Dominic visits Man at home, where he witnesses a heated argument between Man's son Ben, a fellow priest, and daughter Yuet, a paramedic. Yuet expresses her disdain for Man's outdated views, particularly his comments about menstruation and its perceived impurity of women in Taoist beliefs.

To modernize the parlour, Dominic begins accepting tailor-made requests and sells merchandise, but Master Man disapproves of his non-traditional approach. Their conflict intensifies when Dominic agrees to fulfill a special request from a grieving mother who wants to embalm her son using mummification. While other parlours reject her due to the request's unusual nature, Dominic is drawn in by her unlimited budget. He initially attempts to blackmail Ben for help after overhearing that Ben was baptized to secure a spot for his son in a Catholic school, but Ben panics upon seeing the decayed corpse. As Dominic feels helpless, Man shows up and offers assistance to Dominic in embalming the body. Though Dominic expresses gratitude, Man scolds him, explaining that processing such request would obstruct the boy's reincarnation. Determined to learn more about the funeral business, Dominic seeks training in corpse transportation, dressing, and embalming. His growing enthusiasm impresses Man, who begins to accept him. During dinner, Dominic shares his life stories and thanks Man for teaching him about caring for the deceased, contrasting it with his previous focus on the living. Meanwhile, Jade reveals that she is pregnant, leaving Dominic uncertain about how to proceed.

One evening, Ben's wife discloses at dinner that Ben has been baptized, prompting a confrontation the next day. Man tells Ben he is no longer qualified to be a priest and suffers a stroke in the process. Following Man's hospitalization, Ben contemplates migrating to Melbourne after his son is rejected by the Catholic school. Yuet accuses him of irresponsibility, but Ben admits he never wanted to be a priest, and he feels jealous of Yuet's freedom from the family's funeral business which traditionally only passes down to men. Once Man is discharged, Yuet takes on the responsibility of caring for him, but he continues to reject her help due to his misogynist Taoist views, even slapping her when she tries to assist. Eventually, he relents, allowing her support and even protecting her when she is confronted by her hookup's wife in public. One night, Man entrusts Dominic with the funeral parlour license, asking him to take care of the business. The next day, Man passes away in his sleep, leaving a note thanking Dominic for inspiring him to consider the feelings of the living, which he had neglected.

During Man's funeral, Dominic announces that Ben and Yuet will serve as the priests for "Break Hell's Gate". Many guests from the funeral business vehemently oppose the idea of women as Taoist priests, but Dominic refutes their arguments, further revealing that it was Man's final wish for Yuet to take part. Nearly all the guests leave in protest of this protocol breach, but Ben supports Yuet and offers to guide her. Together, they perform the ritual and reconcile, with Ben apologizing to her. Dominic decides to support Jade's pregnancy, realizing that his experience in the funeral business has deepened his understanding of life and its significance.

== Cast ==
- Dayo Wong as Dominic Ngai, a wedding planner who enters the funeral business after the pandemic
- Michael Hui as Master "Hello" Man, a reputable Taoist priest strictly loyal to tradition
- Michelle Wai as Yuet, a paramedic and Master Man's daughter who suffers from her father's patriarchal attitude
- Chu Pak Hong as Ben, Master Man's son who is forced to become a Taoist priest to uphold the family tradition
- Catherine Chau as Jade, Dominic's longtime girlfriend and Ming's niece
- Paul Chun as Uncle Ming, a retiring funeral parlour owner

Also appearing in the film are Elaine Jin as Lin, a restaurant owner near Master Man's funeral parlour who becomes acquainted with Yuet; Chung Suet Ying as Suey, Dominic's loyal assistant who supports his career transition; Rosa Maria Velasco as Miss Yan, a client who wishes to embalm her son's body; Michael Ning as Lai, a client and businessman whose wife dies from an illness; Rachel Leung as Soso, the same-sex lover of Lai's deceased wife; and Thor Lok as On, Yuet's paramedic colleague. Kaki Sham was cast in a co-starring role as Dominic's younger brother, and Vincent Kok was cast in an undisclosed role, but both of their scenes were cut from the theatrical version, and they received special thanks credits.

== Production ==
=== Development ===
Director-screenwriter Anselm Chan conceived the idea of creating a film to explore life and death ten years before the project began, but he felt he "wasn't ready technically or mentally". During the COVID-19 pandemic, he revisited the concept after witnessing numerous deaths around him, and he conducted field research for one and a half year by interviewing various workers in the funeral industry, incorporating real-life events they encountered into the story. In 2022, he began writing the screenplay following his grandmother's passing while he was filming Ready or Rot (2023). Chan intended to cast comedic actors during the scriptwriting phase, believing that they possess the highest acting skills and would be most suited to handle the film's solemn themes, and he selected Dayo Wong and Michael Hui due to the commercial success of Wong's A Guilty Conscience (2023) and Hui's performance in the drama film Godspeed (2016). Since Chan's career has primarily focused on writing comedies, he initially expected rejections when pitching the screenplay and his intended casting choices to Emperor Motion Pictures, but the proposal was unexpectedly accepted on the spot by producer Jason Siu. The project marks Chan's third feature film and the third collaboration with Emperor Motion Pictures. Chan also described the early drafts of the screenplay as more "dark", which met with opposition from the confirmed cast members Dayo Wong, Elaine Jin, and Vincent Kok, prompting him to refine the screenplay to give it a lighter and more comedic tone before Michael Hui received the script and board the project. The screenplay also initially explored themes of sexism in Chinese traditions, inspired by Chan's personal experiences at a relative's funeral.

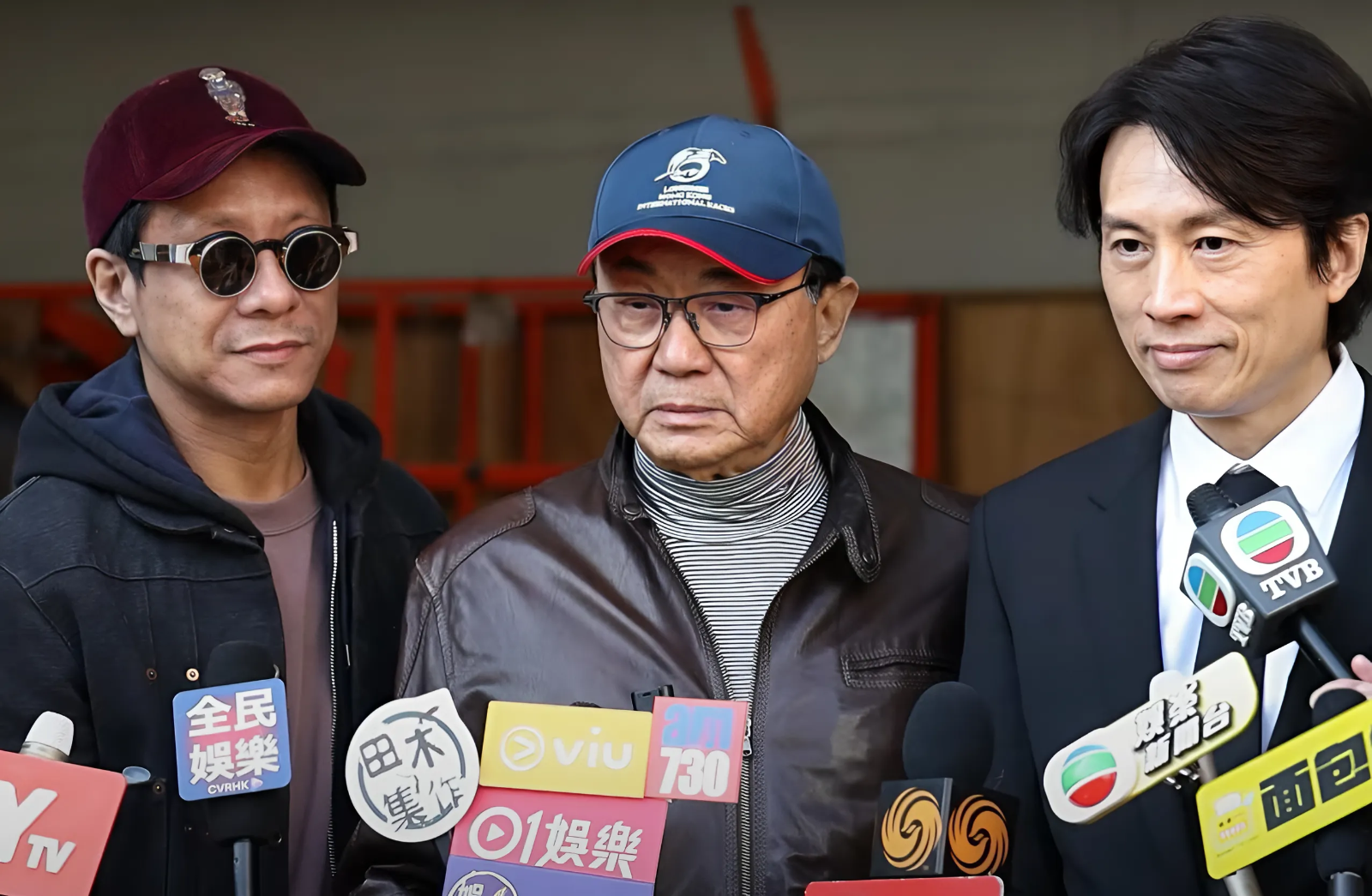
Chu Pak Hong (left), Michael Hui, and Dayo Wong interviewed on set in January 2024

The film was officially announced to be in production with Dayo Wong and Michael Hui as the lead cast on 2 January 2024, under the Chinese working title "度脫之舞" (lit. The Dance of Relief). The title was changed to "破地獄" (lit. Break Hell's Gate (Note: Break Hell's Gate is a traditional Taoist funeral ritual currently listed as an intangible cultural heritage of Hong Kong.)) after filming began. Michelle Wai, Catherine Chau, Chu Pak Hong, Paul Chun, Elaine Jin, and Kaki Sham were revealed to be the rest of the main cast in the same month. Chu Pak Hong, who is a Christian, was invited to join the cast by Chan while they were filming Ready or Rot, even though Chan was uncertain about whether he would accept the role due to his religious beliefs. To prepare for their roles, Chu and Wai learned Break Hell's Gate for nine months before filming, with their training starting prior to receiving the full script. Although the ritual is traditionally performed only by men, Wai described the Taoist priests as "open-minded" and noted that they did not object to teaching her. In March 2024, the film was presented at the Hong Kong Filmart. In April, Dayo Wong teased that the film would be released in 2024, and an official trailer was released in June. Trinity CineAsia acquired distribution rights for the United Kingdom and Ireland in late October.

=== Filming ===
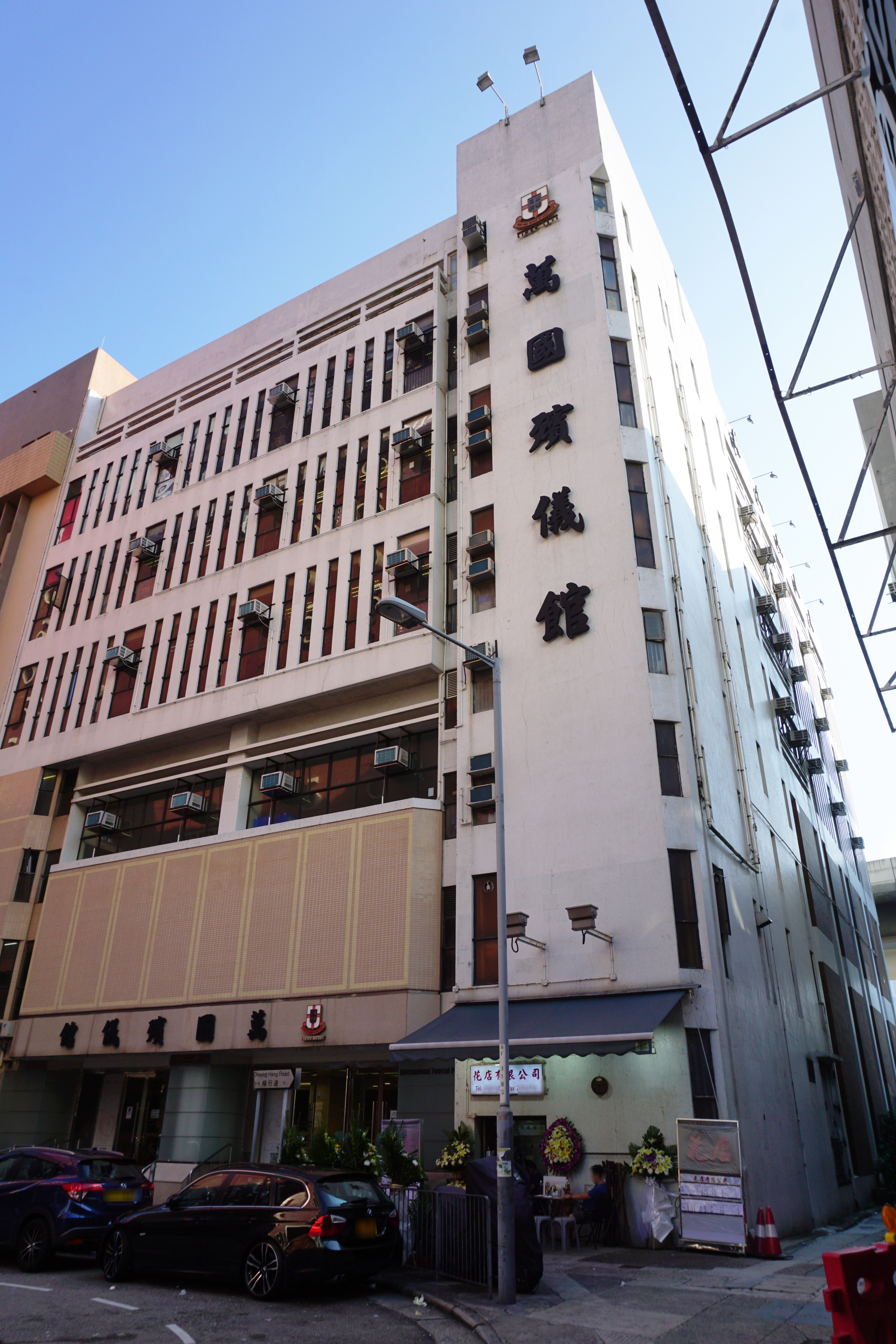
International Funeral Parlour opened for the first time to film

Principal photography began on 4 January 2024 in Tai Po. Most of the location shooting took place in Hung Hom, an area known for its high concentration of funeral businesses, including on Cooke Street and Baker Street. The film was shot on-site at the Tung Wah Coffin Home and the International Funeral Parlour, marking the first times for both venues to be opened for filming. Shooting at the International Funeral Parlour took place at night and included scenes filmed in the mourning halls, basement, and morgue. Filming reportedly wrapped in March, while Anselm Chan noted that post-production lasted for nine months.

=== Music ===
On 10 October 2024, Terence Lam was announced as the composer and performer of the film's theme song "The Last Dance". This film marks Lam's first experience scoring for a feature film, and he joined the project only after watching a test screening to determine if he felt inspired to write the music. The theme song was released online on 23 October. The film's soundtrack was composed by erhu artist Chu Wan-pin. The naamyam piece "Song of the Exile" was also featured in the film.

== Release ==
The Last Dance had its world premiere at the 44th Hawaii International Film Festival on 11 October 2024, followed by screenings as the opening film of the 21st Hong Kong Asian Film Festival, and in the World Focus section of the 37th Tokyo International Film Festival. It subsequently premiered in Hong Kong on 22 October at iSQUARE, Tsim Sha Tsui, with the premiere ceremony co-hosted by the Tung Wah Group of Hospitals. The film was originally scheduled for theatrical release in Hong Kong on 14 November 2024, but in late October, it was announced that the date would be moved up to 9 November, with the distributors citing "positive reviews during festival screenings" as the reason for the change.

Cinemas in Hong Kong and Macau scheduled over 1,000 showings for the film on its first day of release, marking the highest number of showings for any film on its opening day in Hong Kong. The film was marketed alongside another Hong Kong film Cesium Fallout during its early release, offering a packaged ticket set that allowed purchasers to watch both films at a discounted price in November. The film is also set to be screened in the Limelight section of the 54th International Film Festival Rotterdam.

== Reception ==
=== Box office ===
==== Domestic ====
The Last Dance grossed more than HK$5.2 million by 4 pm (HKT) of the opening day, surpassing Twilight of the Warriors: Walled In (2024) to achieve the highest opening day gross for 2024 Hong Kong films. The total box office for the opening day concluded at approximately HK$7.47 million, outdoing the record of HK$5.45 million set by Cold War 2 (2016) and making it the highest opening day gross in the history of Hong Kong cinema. On the early morning of the second day of release, the box office reached HK$10 million, surpassing A Guilty Conscience (2023) which also starred Dayo Wong, and making it the fastest film to reach the 10 million mark in history. The film raked in HK$20 million on its third day of release, and climbed to HK$30 million by the fifth day. The film concluded the first week with HK$50 million, and generated HK$9.18 million in revenue on the eighth day after release, which became the highest single-day gross for a Hong Kong film.

The box office continued to surge, reaching HK$60 million by the tenth day, and rising to HK$80 million by the end of the second week. It surpassed the HK$100 million mark on the twentieth day after release, becoming the third Hong Kong film to achieve a domestic gross of over 100 million and the fastest film to reach this milestone. On 2 December 2024, the film reached HK$112 million during its fourth week of release, surpassing Twilight of the Warriors: Walled In to become the second highest-grossing domestic film. It accumulated a total gross of HK$122 million on 7 December, outdoing A Guilty Conscience to become the highest-grossing domestic film of all time in Hong Kong. The film grossed HK$130 million by 11 December after about a month of release, and concluded 2024 with a gross of over HK$152 million.

==== Mainland Chinese ====
In mainland China, due to positive reviews prior to its release, over 100,000 early screenings were arranged nationwide. It had grossed RMB$70 million by the third day of its release, and reached RMB$90 million on the sixth day.

==== International ====
The film debuted at the top of the weekly box office in Malaysia, grossing RM$10 million within 18 days. In the United Kingdom, the film debuted with the second highest opening day gross, despite being released in only 59 cinemas, compared to Gladiator II, which took first place with releases in 712 cinemas. The box office reached £388,000 during its second week, making it the third highest-grossing Hong Kong film of all time in the United Kingdom and Ireland. It also reached first place in Taiwan's box office during its opening weekend, with a gross of NTD$4.09 million, and accumulated NTD$4.62 million in its first week. The total revenue climbed to NTD$10 million during its second week of release.

=== Critical response ===
On the review aggregator website Rotten Tomatoes, 100% of 14 critics' reviews are positive, with an average rating of 7.7/10.

Richard Kuipers of Variety described The Last Dance as "lovely, life-affirming", highlighting its poignant exploration of life and death through the unlikely partnership of a former wedding planner and a traditional Taoist priest, strengthened by the chemistry between Dayo Wong and Michael Hui, while also praising Michelle Wai as a "particular standout", along with the "polished cinematography" and "terrific production design", and noting the film's insightful commentary on gender roles and personal growth within the context of Hong Kong's deeply rooted Taoist funeral customs. Phil Hoad of The Guardian gave the film 4/5 stars, describing it as a "well-constructed and punchy melodrama" that effectively balances themes of death, tradition, and sexism through its "confident dramatic patterning" and "breezy universality", while also acknowledging the complementary relationship between the characters portrayed by Dayo Wong and Michael Hui.

Edmund Lee of South China Morning Post also gave the film 4/5 stars and called it "one of the best women's empowerment films Hong Kong cinema has seen", particularly praising Michelle Wai's "career-best performance" with her portrayal of her character's conflicted emotions in the face of her father and brother's misogynistic mindsets, and noted the film's powerful themes regarding gender and the search for meaning in life. Lee also ranked the film second out of the 36 Hong Kong films theatrically released in 2024. In Joanne Soh's 4/5 star review for The Straits Times, she described highlighted the "strong performances" from Dayo Wong and Michael Hui and "fascinating glimpses into Hong Kong's funeral traditions". Tay Yek Keak of 8days gave the film 4.5/5 stars and lauded the film as "well-scripted and wonderfully acted", emphasizing the unusual casting choices of Wong and Hui that resonate unexpectedly with Anselm Chan's story and effectively convey a hopeful message about life and human connections.

Wendy Ide of Screen International described the film as engaging for its successful blend of domestic drama and humor, offering a "forthright examination of the collision between tradition and feminism" through the "conflicted, strong-willed, and empathetic" character of Yuet, while also acknowledging the "vivid depiction of Taoist funeral rituals" and the emotionally resonant film score. David West of Sight and Sound described the film as "moving, serious, and yet stubbornly celebratory," effectively showcasing the talents of the "unlikely choice" of casting comedy legends Dayo Wong and Michael Hui in a serious context, highlighting their unexpectedly profound performances while capturing the "clash of generations and values" and "Hong Kong's unique funeral culture".

Keith Ho, writing for HK01, praised the screenplay as "masterful" for redefining the concept of "Break Hell's Gate" and highlighting its poignant exploration of life, death, and the struggles of women in a patriarchal society, while also commending the female ensemble's performances and specifically acknowledging Chu Pak Hong and Michelle Wai for their memorable portrayals of complex characters. In his Esquire review, Kwok Ching-yin praised the film as a significant achievement in Hong Kong cinema for its box office success, commending its strong script and character development, particularly highlighting the performances of Dayo Wong and Michael Hui for their successful transition from comedic roles to exploring serious themes, which ultimately showcases the film's depth and emotional resonance in a challenging market.

== Awards and nominations ==
The film received a total of 18 nominations in the 43rd Hong Kong Film Awards, making it the most-nominated film of the year.

Year	Award	Category	Nominee	Result	Ref.
2024	39th Huading Awards	Best Actress	Michelle Wai	Won	
2024	16th Golden Lotus Awards	Best Director	Anselm Chan	Won	
2024	16th Golden Lotus Awards	Best Actor	Dayo Wong	Won	
2024	16th Golden Lotus Awards	Best Actress	Michelle Wai	Won	
2025	31st Hong Kong Film Critics Society Awards	Film of Merit	—N/a	Won	
2025	20th Hong Kong Film Directors' Guild Awards	Best Actor	Michael Hui	Won	
2025	20th Hong Kong Film Directors' Guild Awards	Best Actress	Michelle Wai	Won	
2025	20th Hong Kong Film Directors' Guild Awards	Best Supporting Actor	Chu Pak Hong	Won	
2025	18th Asian Film Awards	Best Actor	Michael Hui	Nominated	
2025	18th Asian Film Awards	Best Supporting Actor	Chu Pak Hong	Nominated	
2025	18th Asian Film Awards	Best Original Music	Chu Wan-pin	Won	
2025	43rd Hong Kong Film Awards	Best Film	—N/a	Nominated	
2025	43rd Hong Kong Film Awards	Best Director	Anselm Chan	Nominated	
2025	43rd Hong Kong Film Awards	Best Screenplay	Anselm Chan, Cheng Wai-kei	Won	
2025	43rd Hong Kong Film Awards	Best Actor	Michael Hui	Nominated	
2025	43rd Hong Kong Film Awards	Best Actress	Michelle Wai	Won	
2025	43rd Hong Kong Film Awards	Best Supporting Actor	Chu Pak Hong	Won	
2025	43rd Hong Kong Film Awards	Best Supporting Actor	Paul Chun	Nominated	
2025	43rd Hong Kong Film Awards	Best Supporting Actress	Rachel Leung	Nominated	
2025	43rd Hong Kong Film Awards	Best Supporting Actress	Rosa Maria Velasco	Nominated	
2025	43rd Hong Kong Film Awards	Best Cinematography	Anthony Pun	Nominated	
2025	43rd Hong Kong Film Awards	Best Editing	William Chang, Curran Pang	Nominated	
2025	43rd Hong Kong Film Awards	Best Art Direction	Yiu Hon-man	Nominated	
2025	43rd Hong Kong Film Awards	Best Costume Make Up Design	Lee Pik-kwan	Nominated	
2025	43rd Hong Kong Film Awards	Best Action Choreography	Jack Wong	Nominated	
2025	43rd Hong Kong Film Awards	Best Original Film Score	Chu Wan-pin	Won	
2025	43rd Hong Kong Film Awards	Best Original Film Song	"The Last Dance"	Won	
2025	43rd Hong Kong Film Awards	Best Sound Design	Yiu Chun-hin	Nominated	
2025	43rd Hong Kong Film Awards	Best Visual Effects	Water Chan	Nominated	
2025	38th Golden Rooster Awards	Best Picture	—N/a	Nominated	
2025	38th Golden Rooster Awards	Best Director	Anselm Chan	Nominated	
2025	38th Golden Rooster Awards	Best Actress	Michelle Wai	Nominated	
2025	38th Golden Rooster Awards	Best Writing	Anselm Chan, Cheng Wai-kei	Won	
2025	38th Golden Rooster Awards	Best Editing	William Chang, Curran Pang	Nominated	
2025	11th Asian World Film Festival	Snow Leopard Jury Discretionary Award for Best Director	Anselm Chan	Won	

== See also ==
- List of submissions to the 98th Academy Awards for Best International Feature Film
- List of Hong Kong submissions for the Academy Award for Best International Feature Film
