= Last Song for You =

2024 Hong Kong film by Jill Leung

- Theatrical poster
- Traditional Chinese: 久別重逢
- Literal meaning: To meet again after a long separation
- Jyutping: Gau^{2} Bit^{6} Cung^{4} Fung^{4}
- Directed by: Jill Leung
- Screenplay by: Jill Leung
- Produced by: Wilson Yip; Pang Yuk-lam
- Starring: Ekin Cheng; Natalie Hsu; Ian Chan; Cecilia Choi
- Cinematography: Oliver Lau
- Edited by: Tsang Yu-kin
- Music by: Chan Kwong-wing; Kay Chan
- Production company: Mei Ah Entertainment
- Distributed by: Intercontinental Film
- Release date: 20 December 2024 (Hong Kong)
- Running time: 110 minutes
- Country: Hong Kong
- Language: Cantonese

Last Song for You (Chinese: 久別重逢) is a 2024 Hong Kong romance film directed and written by Jill Leung in his directorial debut and produced by Wilson Yip. Starring Ekin Cheng, Natalie Hsu, Ian Chan, and Cecilia Choi, the film follows a washed-up songwriter (Cheng) who embarks on a journey with the daughter of his childhood love (Hsu) to navigate his life and heal old wounds.

Marking a transition from screenwriting in the Hong Kong action cinema, Jill Leung intended to make his directorial debut with a romance film, which was greenlit by the Hong Kong Film Development Council in January 2021. Principal photography began in October 2023, taking place primarily in Cheung Chau, Hong Kong and Shikoku, Japan. The film also features a theme song of the same title, co-performed by lead actors Ekin Cheng and Ian Chan. The film was theatrically released in Hong Kong on 20 December 2024, and received seven nominations in the 43rd Hong Kong Film Awards, with Natalie Hsu nominated for Best Actress.

== Plot ==
A washed-up songwriter So, who has lost his inspiration, is hospitalized due to severe gout and attempts to end his life. There, he encounters his childhood love, Ha. Shortly after their reunion, So learns from their mutual friend Bing that Ha has died from cancer. After attending Ha's funeral, he meets a girl named Summer, who claims to be Ha's daughter. She asks him to scatter her mother's cremated ashes in Japan, fulfilling her final wish.

Initially hesitant, So travels to Japan and reunites with Summer at a hotel. Excited to see him, Summer tries to engage So in conversation, but he remains distant. When they have drinks at a pub and Summer plays one of So's songs on the piano, So begins to recall memories of Ha. The two lived in Cheung Chau and met at a record shop, where they discover a shared taste in music. Later, Ha finds So in the school's warehouse, intrigued by his emotional compositions. They start chatting frequently, with So seeking Ha's feedback on his songs. On Ha's encouragement, So enters a singing contest in the urban district but is eliminated when the judges dislike his original song. That same day, he encounters his father, who is cheating with another woman. Confronting his father at home, So learns that his father plans to divorce his mother. Ha intends to confess her feelings to So before learning that So's parents are divorcing and that he will leave for Australia with his mother the following week. Heartbroken, she cries at home, comforted by her grandmother, who gives her a crystal necklace that can transport a person to their desired time and place. Wearing the necklace and making a wish, Ha finds herself in the future, at the hospital where her future self lies. The future Ha, knowing she is dying, asks Ha to find So for her, revealing that Summer is actually Ha time-traveling from the past.

Back in the present, Summer sneaks into So's room and sends his incomplete song to a producer on So's behalf. Initially furious, So calms down after Summer apologizes and begins to open up to her after they scatter the ashes together. However, So later tells Summer he plans to quit music, which disappoints her. She tries to motivate him by playing a song he wrote about chasing dreams. Then, she reveals she is actually Ha from the past and leaves. Before So can catch up, Ha disappears into a shrine. So returns to Hong Kong and, with Bing's help, finds Ha's real daughter, who gives him her mother's crystal necklace. So wears it and makes a wish, sending him back to the past. He finds the young So and Ha at the beach, playing with friends. Ha recognizes him and takes their friends away to make room for a private chat between the two Sos. The older So plays the incomplete song to the young So who is unaware of his identity, and together they improvise the latter half. The older So also chats with young Ha, and they promise to try their best to make a difference in their future. After returning to the present, So contacts Ha, who replies, revealing she has survived through alternative treatments. They reunite at their alma mater's warehouse, where So plays his song for her.

== Cast ==
- Ekin Cheng as So Sing-wah, a washed-up Cantopop songwriter
- Natalie Hsu as Summer, a teenage girl who claims to be Ha Man-huen's daughter
- Ian Chan as young So Sing-wah, a high school student who aspires to become a songwriter
- Cecilia Choi as Ha Man-huen, the childhood love of So Sing-wah

Also appearing in the film are Chu Pak Hong and Henick Chou as the older and younger versions of Bing, So and Ha's classmate and mutual friend; Chu Pak Him as So's father; Bonnie Wong as Ha's grandmother; and Julius Brian Siswojo as Hugo, So's record producer. Jiro Lee cameos as a school janitor.

== Production ==
=== Development ===
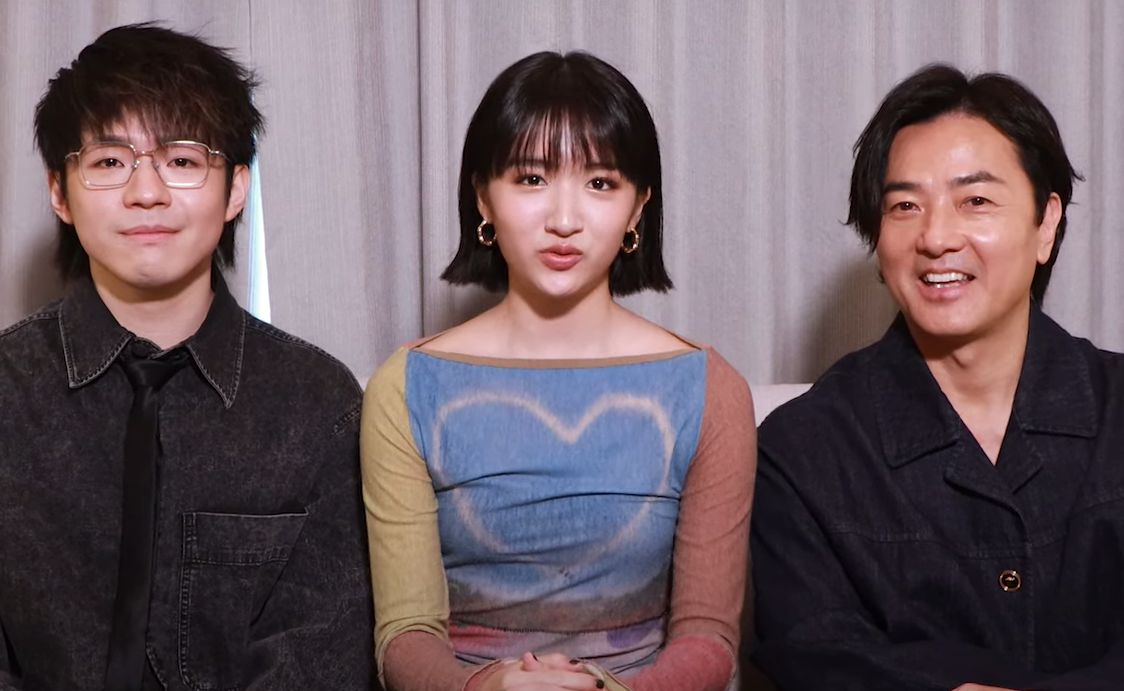
Ian Chan (left), Natalie Hsu, and Ekin Cheng interviewed by am730 in December 2024

Screenwriter Jill Leung worked for over 20 years in Hong Kong action cinema before planning his directorial debut with a romance film, a genre he considers his favorite and feels has been lacking in recent years. He invited his frequent collaborator and film director Wilson Yip as the film's producer. The film was greenlit in January 2021 by the Hong Kong Film Development Council, with funding of HKD$5,353,220. To prepare for his directorial debut, Leung took acting classes with actor Chu Pak Him to improve his communication with the cast. He envisioned the protagonist being played by Ekin Cheng and Ian Chan in the early stages of the project and directly approached them, as he found both to be musicians who have "a self-sufficient vibe from the showbiz" that suits the character's traits. Cheng accepted the invitation from Wilson Yip right after reading the screenplay, finding the role a refreshing change from the gang bosses he usually plays and a challenging portrayal. The film also marks singer Ian Chan's first leading role in a feature film. In October 2023, the film was announced as in production, with Cheng, Chan, and Natalie Hsu confirmed as the lead cast. In March 2024, the film was presented at the Hong Kong Filmart. The film was presented at the Asian Contents & Film Market in October, and an official trailer was released that same month, with a tentative release date set for December.

=== Filming ===
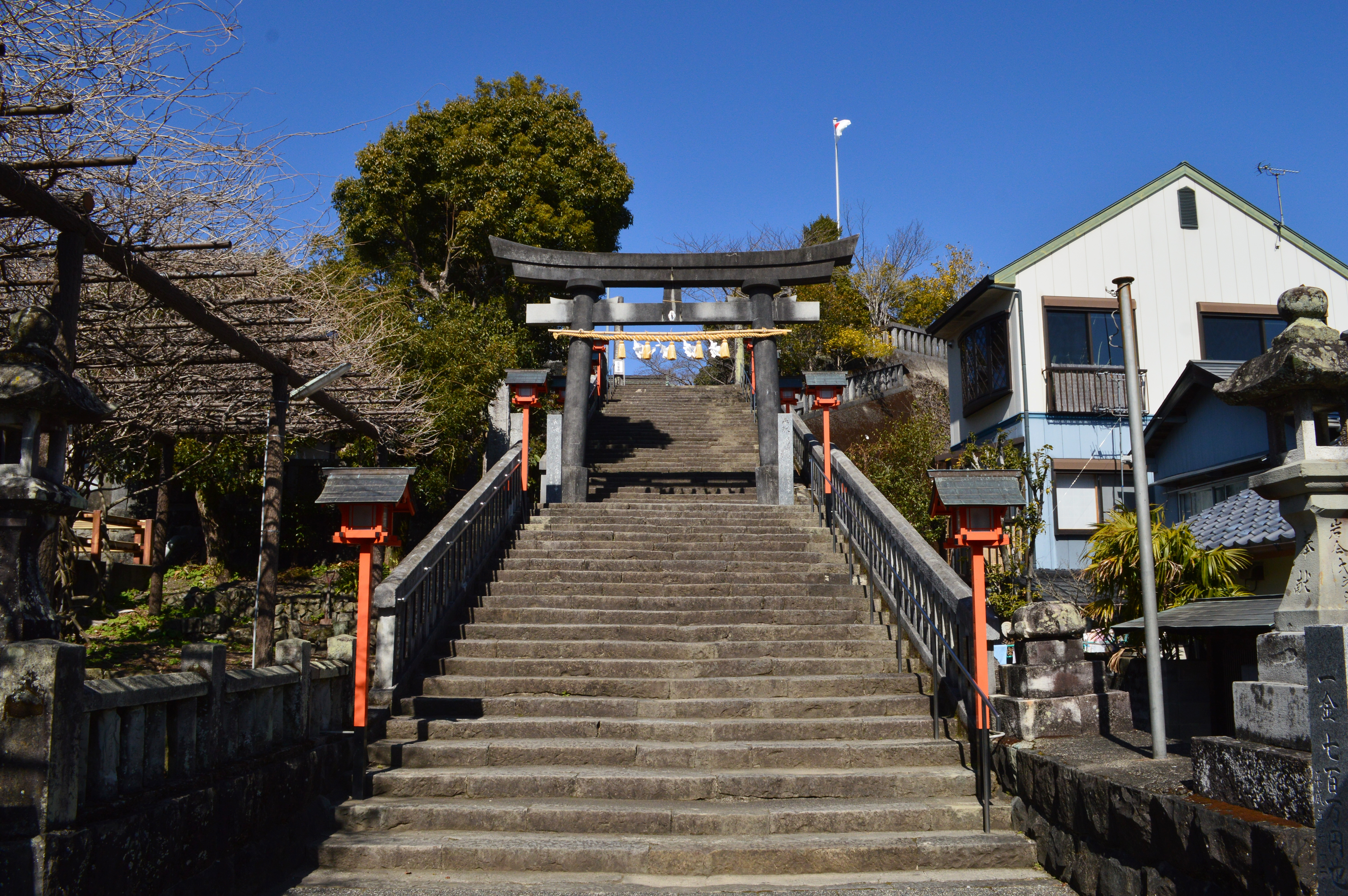
The shrine scenes were shot at Ichijyo Shrine in Kōchi Prefecture, Japan.

Principal photography began on 16 October 2023, with filming locations in both Hong Kong and Japan. In Hong Kong, the shoot primarily took place in Cheung Chau, with school scenes filmed at Cheung Chau Church Kam Kong Primary School, as well as at Tin Fuk Ting and Tai Shek Hau Tin Hau Temple. Leung chose to film in Cheung Chau because he felt the island's current atmosphere still evokes the essence of late 1990s Hong Kong, fitting the film's chronological setting. Additional shoots included scenes set in the record shop, which were filmed at Sino Centre in Mong Kok, while hospital scenes were shot at Yan Chai Hospital in Tsuen Wan. In Japan, filming occurred in Kōchi Prefecture and Ehime Prefecture on Shikoku, with notable locations in Ehime including Dōgo Onsen Honkan and Okaido Shopping Street, and the shrine scenes were filmed at Ichijyo Shrine in Kōchi. Leung selected Shikoku for its unique mirages of sunsets and sunrises, which he believed echoed the film's themes.

=== Music ===
Last Song for You is scored by Chan Kwong-wing. It features a theme song also titled "Last Song for You", composed by Chan with lyrics written by Oscar Lee, and co-performed by Ekin Cheng and Ian Chan. The theme song was released publicly on YouTube on 16 December 2024, along with a music video produced by Jill Leung. The film also includes an interlude "Tides", which was composed, arranged, and performed by Ian Chan, who also co-wrote the lyrics with singer-songwriter Anson Poon. Ekin Cheng's 1996 single "My Song" is featured in the film as well. Regarding the song choices, Alex Chung of HK01 praised the inclusion of Cheng's "My Song", noting that the lyrics not only echo the film's themes, but also effectively weave through the story and complement the protagonists' romance; Ho Tak of Harper's Bazaar shared a similar opinion, acknowledging "My Song" as fitting for the film's themes and the nostalgic feeling it evokes, while also commending Ian Chan's "Tides", describing the scene in which he performs the song as "deeply moving".

== Release ==
Last Song for You had its premiere in Sha Tin on 10 December 2024, followed by a theatrical release in Hong Kong on 20 December. The film was also screened in the Harbour section at the 54th International Film Festival Rotterdam, in competition at the 20th Osaka Asian Film Festival, and in competition at the 27th Far East Film Festival.

The film is also selected at the 24th New York Asian Film Festival to be held from July 11 to July 25, 2025 for its North American Premiere.

== Reception ==
=== Box office ===
Last Song for You debuted with HK$378,000, rising to fourth place at the box office on its opening day. By the sixth day of its release, it accumulated a gross of HK$4 million, including approximately HK$1.8 million during Christmas, also ranking fourth in Hong Kong's Christmas box office.

=== Critical response ===
Edmund Lee of South China Morning Post gave Last Song for You 3.5/5 stars and described it as suitable for "jaded viewers to reconnect with their younger, purer selves", particularly praising the use of an "unsophisticated conception of time travel" that maximize emotional resonance, as well as Ekin Cheng's "refreshing" character and Natalie Hsu's "heart-melting performance" that "elevates the film with its genuine quality". Lee also ranked the film sixth out of the 36 Hong Kong films theatrically released in 2024. Calvin Choi, writing for my903.com, described the film as "extremely clichéd" yet "deeply moving", noting that the "ordinary" setting, reflected in both the characters and themes, was made compelling through Natalie Hsu's performance, evoking a sense of nostalgia and emotional connection often absent in contemporary Hong Kong cinema.

Connie Chan of Esquire commended the film as "a stunning directorial debut" by Jill Leung, noting that it stands out among recent Hong Kong films by presenting a heartfelt story of love and dreams through the journey of a middle-aged musician's self-discovery, with strong performances from the cast, particularly Natalie Hsu's portrayal of youthful innocence and the profound resonance brought by the characters' shared memories. Ringo Fung of am730 shared similar opinion with Chan and noted that the film offers a "refreshing depiction of the excitement of puppy love", particularly praising the performances of Ian Chan and Natalie Hsu, as well as the film's emotional resonance from the perspective of a middle-aged man. Keith Ho, reviewing for HK01, acknowledged Jill Leung's direction, lauding the choice of filming locations in Cheung Chau and Kōchi Prefecture, which bring a natural sense of elegance and happiness, respectively, while noting the effective use of the nostalgic songs by Ekin Cheng and emotionally enriching tracks by singer-actor Ian Chan.

== Awards and nominations ==
Year	Award	Category	Nominee	Result	Ref.
2025	43rd Hong Kong Film Awards	Best Actress	Natalie Hsu	Nominated	
2025	43rd Hong Kong Film Awards	Best New Performer	Ian Chan	Nominated	
2025	43rd Hong Kong Film Awards	Best Cinematography	Oliver Lau	Nominated	
2025	43rd Hong Kong Film Awards	Best Art Direction	Twiggy Tang	Nominated	
2025	43rd Hong Kong Film Awards	Best Original Film Score	Chan Kwong-wing, Kay Chan	Nominated	
2025	43rd Hong Kong Film Awards	Best Original Film Song	"Last Song For You"	Nominated	
2025	43rd Hong Kong Film Awards	Best New Director	Jill Leung	Nominated	
2025	27th Far East Film Festival	Golden Mulberry	—N/a	Nominated	
