= Cesium Fallout =

2024 Hong Kong film by Anthony Pun

- Theatrical release poster
- Traditional Chinese: 焚城
- Simplified Chinese: 焚城
- Literal meaning: Burning City
- Hanyu Pinyin: Fén Chéng
- Jyutping: Fan4 Sing4
- Directed by: Anthony Pun
- Written by: Mak Tin-shu; Shum Kwan-sin; Wong Wing-yiu; Frances To; Oscar Fung
- Produced by: Andy Lau; William Kong; Anthony Pun
- Starring: Andy Lau; Bai Yu; Karen Mok
- Cinematography: Anthony Pun
- Edited by: Cheung Ka-fai
- Music by: Elliot Leung
- Production companies: Edko Films; Alibaba Pictures
- Distributed by: Edko Films
- Release date: 1 November 2024
- Running time: 138 minutes
- Country: Hong Kong
- Language: Cantonese
- Box office: US$41.3 million (Note: See Box office)

Cesium Fallout is a 2024 Hong Kong disaster thriller film produced and directed by Anthony Pun, produced by and starring Andy Lau. Touted as the first nuclear radiation disaster-themed blockbuster production from Hong Kong, the film revolves around an accidental radioactive leak in the city which puts the lives of seven million citizens at risk.

Production took place throughout 2024. The film was theatrically released on 1 November 2024.

== Plot summary ==
In 1996, Financial Secretary Simon Fan (played by Andy Lau) loosens container inspection regulations, allowing unscrupulous traders to exploit loopholes to import dangerous goods. Thus a fire breaks out at the Kwai Chung Container Terminals, resulting in deaths of several firefighters, including his wife, May Lai. Following this tragedy, Simon Fan leaves the political field, pursues degrees, and becomes a waste management expert.

In 2007, a high-intensity radioactive material, cesium-137, suddenly leaks at the Hung Lik Recycling Yard in Queen's Hill, Fanling. Tropical Storm Murphy is looming, which means that radiation could spread across Hong Kong within 24 hours, putting seven million people in grave danger. To avoid causing public panic, Hong Kong government officials decide to withhold information about the radiation. Simon Fan and main officials headed by the Acting Chief Executive, Cecilia Wong (played by Karen Mok), engage in a fierce confrontation, as Simon fights to secure a chance of survival for the public. Meanwhile, fire station officer Lai Kit-fung (played by Bai Yu) and his teammates are dispatched to the unknown front line, unaware that there may be more behind this disaster than meets the eye.

== Cast ==
- Andy Lau as Simon Fan, former Financial Secretary of Hong Kong who is now a scientist and nuclear radiation expert
- Bai Yu as Lai Kit-fung, a station officer of the Hong Kong Fire Services Department and Simon's younger brother in-law who blames Simon for his sister's death.
  - Siuyea Lo provides the Cantonese voice dub for Bai Yu
- Karen Mok as Cecilia Fong, the Financial Secretary and the acting Chief Executive of Hong Kong.
- Tse Kwan-ho as Chainsmoker, principal fireman of the unit
- Ivana Wong as Kelly Wong, administrative officer along with Cecilia Fong
- Louise Wong as Madam Chan Mei-yan, a senior station officer of the fire unit
- Fish Liew as Zoe, principal firewoman of the unit
- Dee Ho as Water, firefighter
- Jeffrey Ngai as Sai-chu, firefighter
- Leung Chung-hang as Po-ming, senior fireman of the unit
- Bowie Lam as the Director of Fire Services
- Michael Wong as Peter Cowen, APAC CEO of DOE Corporation
- Michael Chow as Roger Fong, businessman and husband of Cecilia Fong who colludes with Cowen.
- Kent Cheng as the Secretary for Security.
- Kenny Wong as Lau Siu-keung, firefighting coordinator of the unit
- Locker Lam as Finger, firefighter
- Wesley Wong as Big B, firefighter

=== Guest appearances ===
- David Chiang as the Chief Executive of Hong Kong
- Patra Au as the director of Hong Kong Observatory
- Natalie Hsu as Eileen Fan, Simon's daughter
- Eric Kwok as Eric, the explosive officer of civil engineering
- Max Cheung as Maxco, the explosive officer of civil engineering
- Cheung Tat-ming as cafe owner nearby the fire place
- Wu Yanshu as Simon Fan's mother-in-law
  - Nina Paw provides the Cantonese voice dub for Wu Yanshu.
- Tong Yao as May Fan, the late wife of Simon Fan and a firefighter who died in an accident
- Patrick Pak as the chairman of Hospital Authority
- Deon Cheung as the director of FEHD
- Simon Yu as the Commissioner of Police

== Production ==
The film was publicly announced during filming on 17 June 2024, where producer Edko Films officially released a teaser poster which also states the release date within 2024 despite reports from Variety that the film was expected to complete production by the end of the year. The same day, producer Bill Kong, alongside cast members Bai Yu and Louise Wong, promoted the film during a presentation event at the 26th Shanghai International Film Festival, where Bai and Wong revealed their roles as firefighters in the film. Producer and star Andy Lau also appeared via a pre-recorded video discussing his role as a radiation crisis expert, as well as production of disaster spectacles and themes of humanity.

On 19 July 2024, Karen Mok revealed that she had to memorise many professional terms for her role and will start working on promotions by the latter half of the year.

== Release ==
Cesium Fallout was theatrically released on 1 November 2024 in Hong Kong. The film was marketed alongside another Hong Kong film The Last Dance during its early release, offering a packaged ticket set that allowed purchasers to watch both films at a discounted price in November.

=== Box office ===
Cesium Fallout has grossed a total of US$41.3 million worldwide combining its box office gross from Hong Kong (US$5.3 million) and China (US$36 million).

The film debuted at No. 1 during its opening weekend in Hong Kong grossing HK$9,281,777 (US$1,193,494) during its first three days of release, while accumulating a total of HK$10,073,229 (US$1,295,262) by then end of the weekend including preview screenings. In its second weekend, the film grossed HK$10,490,080 (US$1,349,267) while coming in at No. 2, and have grossed a total of HK$20,595,076 (US$2,649,004) by then. The film remained at No. 2 during its third weekend grossing HK$7,556,285 (US$970,594), while having accumulated a total gross of HK$28,150,016 (US$3,615,828) by then. The film stayed at No. 2 for its third consecutive week by its fourth weekend grossing HK$5,084,267 (US$653,129), while having grossed a total of HK$32,251,872 (US$4,143,099) so far. The film stayed at No. 2 for its fourth consecutive week during its fifth weekend grossing HK$5,084,267 (US$472,743), while having grossed a total of HK$35,930,694 (US$3,678,822) by then. During its sixth weekend, the film grossed HK$2,169,195 (US$278,843), coming in at No. 5, while accumulating a total gross of HK$38,100,819 (US$4,897,731) by then. The film remained at No. 5 in its seventh weekend while grossing HK$1,187,263 (US$152,687), and have grossed a total of HK$39,288,082 (US$5,052,623) by then. During its eighth weekend, the film grossed HK$754,542 (US$97,032) coming in at No. 9, while having accumulated a total gross of HK$40,042,624 (US$5,149,362) by then. In its 9th weekend, the film grossed HK$829,861 (US$106,913), while having grossed a total of HK$40,872,485 (US$5,265,702) so far.

In China, the film debuted at No. 2 during its opening weekend, grossing US$11.6 million during its first three days of release and accumulating a total gross of US$12.4 million including previews. The film moved up to No. 1 during its second weekend grossing US$13.4 million, while having a cumulative gross of US$25.8 million by then. During its third weekend, the film grossed US$7.5 million, coming in at No. 3, while having accumulated a total gross of US$33.3 million by then. The film grossed US$2.7 million in its fourth weekend, coming in at No. 7, and have grossed a total of US$36 million so far. The film grossed US$2.7 million in its fourth weekend, coming in at No. 7, and have grossed a total of US$36 million so far.

=== Critical reception ===
James Marsh of Deadline Hollywood praises Anthony Pun's cinematography, noting its visual coherence and ultimately writes Cesium Fallout bombards its audience with a cacophony of mindless destruction and muddled messaging, yet somehow fails to illustrate just what it is that these individuals are so courageously fighting for. Edmund Lee of South China Morning Post gave the film 3.5/5 stars, calling it "immersive and engaging" and praising its logical narrative and "solid performances", while noting that despite some contrived plot elements, it effectively balances action and drama in its thoughtful exploration of a nuclear crisis. Lee also ranked the film eighth out of the 36 Hong Kong films theatrically released in 2024.

Yasmin Zulraez of The Sun gave the film 7/10 and praised it as a "roller-coaster ride filled with tension, heroism and the kind of emotional weight that grips the heartstrings", highlighting the film's effective combination of intense action with emotional depth, with strong performances and exploration of themes like redemption and personal conflict, despite some melodramatic moments. Whang Yee Ling of The Straits Times gave the film 3/5 stars, describing it as "big, unsubtle entertainment" that critically examines government indecision and delivers a "tense" apocalyptic spectacle effectively highlighting the dangers of man-made disasters, though she found the crisis ultimately "exhausting".

== Awards and nominations ==
Year	Award	Category	Nominee	Result	Ref.
2025	43rd Hong Kong Film Awards	Best Cinematography	Anthony Pun	Nominated	
2025	43rd Hong Kong Film Awards	Best Art Direction	Lee Kin-wai	Nominated	
2025	43rd Hong Kong Film Awards	Best Action Choreography	Jack Wong	Nominated	
2025	43rd Hong Kong Film Awards	Best Sound Design	Tu Duu-chih, Chiang Yi-chen	Nominated	
2025	43rd Hong Kong Film Awards	Best Visual Effects	Dennis Yeung, Adrian Chan	Nominated	

== See also ==
- Andy Lau filmography
- Goiânia accident
