= Anthony Pun =

Hong Kong filmmaker

- 潘耀明
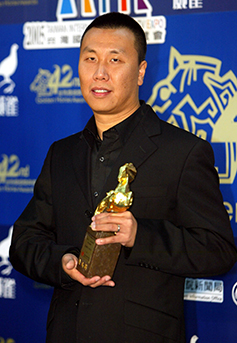
- Pun in November 2005
- Born: Pun Yiu-ming; Hong Kong
- Occupations: Director; Cinematographer
- Years active: 1994–present

Anthony Pun Yiu-ming (Note: Occasionally credited as Anthony Poon.) (Chinese: 潘耀明) is a Hong Kong filmmaker. Making his debut as a cinematographer in 1994, Pun is known for his collaborations with director Benny Chan, and he won Best Cinematography in the 42nd Golden Horse Awards for their action film Divergence (2005). He is also a twelve-time nominee for the Hong Kong Film Award for Best Cinematography, winning twice for The Silent War (2012) and The Goldfinger (2023) in the 32nd and 42nd Hong Kong Film Awards respectively.

Pun made his directorial debut by co-directing the crime film Extraordinary Mission (2017) with Alan Mak, followed by his first and second solo directorial efforts with the drama film One More Chance (2023) and the disaster film Cesium Fallout (2024).

== Early life ==
Pun developed an interest in photography at a young age, and entered the film industry in the 1980s. He initially worked as a gaffer apprentice before transitioning to the cinematography crew, where he served as an apprentice to Joe Chan Kwong-hung.

== Career ==
=== Early ventures and critical recognition (1994–2016) ===
Pun received his first solo cinematographer credit with Lau Kar-yung's 1994 drama film Lanterns. He took on another cinematographer role for Benny Chan's 1999 action-comedy film Gen-X Cops, marking the beginning of his cinematographic career. This also initiated his frequent collaborations with Chan, starting with his role in the sequel Gen-Y Cops in 2000. Pun went on to work on the 2001 romantic comedy La Brassiere and the 2002 horror film Demi-Haunted, before reuniting with Chan on the crime-action film Heroic Duo, which earned him his first nomination for Best Cinematography in the 23rd Hong Kong Film Awards. In 2004, he served as cinematographer for Wilson Yip's romance film Leaving Me, Loving You and Chan's New Police Story, where he received another nomination for Best Cinematography in the 24th Hong Kong Film Awards with the former. In 2005, Pun won Best Cinematography in the 42nd Golden Horse Awards for Chan's action film Divergence, and continued to collaborate with Chan on the 2006 action-comedy film Rob-B-Hood starring Jackie Chan and Louis Koo. Jay Weissberg of Variety praised Pun's "masterful ease with complicated spatial constructions", noting that he was "clearly enjoying the expansive possibilities of scope". Pun then worked on Chan's 2007 action film Invisible Target, and the 2008 action film Connected, with Derek Elley of Variety describing Pun's widescreen lensing in Connected as "tops".

In 2009, Pun filmed the Taiwanese-Hong Kong-Chinese historical epic Empire of Silver, earning nominations for Best Cinematography in both the 27th Golden Rooster Awards and the 29th Hong Kong Film Awards. Don Groves of SBS Australia praised Pun's cinematography as "spectacular", noting that he "makes maximum use of the locations"; while Ho Yi of Taipei Times commended Pun for delivering "an immaculately polished look" and demonstrating "unforgiving attention to the smallest detail" in the film. That same year, Pun also worked on Alan Mak and Felix Chong's Overheard, marking the start of their future frequent collaborations. Mak described Pun as a "sentimental person", noting that his filming style is meticulous, with every shot carefully planned out. He later participated in the 2010 action film Triple Tap, and the 2011 anthology drama film 10+10, contributing to the segment 100. The same year, Pun returned to shoot the sequel Overheard 2, for which Hugo Ozman of Screen Anarchy praised him for the film's high production value and called the action scenes "wonderful". He was nominated once again in the 31st Hong Kong Film Awards. In 2012, he filmed Mak and Chong's action film The Silent War, for which he won Best Cinematography in the 32nd Hong Kong Film Awards.

Pun collaborated with Chan again on the 2013 crime thriller The White Storm, followed by Mak and Chong's Overheard 3 in 2014, earning him nominations in the 33rd and 34th Hong Kong Film Awards. Clarence Tsui of The Hollywood Reporter described The White Storm as a "full-on cinematic spectacle", while James Marsh of Screen Daily praised Pun's "lush cinematography" in Overheard 3, which gave the film "a luxurious, almost garish sheen"; and Ronnie Scheib of Variety called Overheard 3 stylish thanks to Pun's "high-contrast lensing". In 2015, Pun worked on Adrian Kwan's education-themed drama Little Big Master, produced by Benny Chan. Clarence Tsui of The Hollywood Reporter praised his camerawork for "getting the best out of [the child actors'] raw performances", while Maggie Lee of Variety noted that Pun effectively captured "the drab New Territories and crumbling school with the plainest of shots". That same year, he also worked on the Chinese-Hong Kong fantasy action film Monster Hunt.

=== Directorial debut and multi-faceted career (2017–present) ===
In 2017, Pun made his directorial debut by co-directing the crime film Extraordinary Mission with Alan Mak, with a screenplay by Felix Chong. Ed Travis of Cinapse noted that Pun, along with Chong and Mak, who have produced numerous classics, offered "a new go" on the classic police-undercover theme in Hong Kong action cinema. In 2018, he reprised his role in Monster Hunt 2, receiving his eighth nomination in the 38th Hong Kong Film Awards. Clarence Tsui of The Hollywood Reporter lauded Pun for bringing "immaculate special effects" and "impressive production design" vividly to the forefront. The following year, Pun served as the director of photography for the thriller film Bodies at Rest. In 2021, Pun cinematographed Anita, the biographical film about Anita Mui. Richard Kuipers of Variety complimented Pun for "bringing [his] A game to this enterprise" through his nostalgic camerawork, which enabled the film to "rock into 1982". He received another nomination in the 40th Hong Kong Film Awards. Following Benny Chan's death in 2020, he was given special thanks in Chan's posthumously released swan song Raging Fire, and served as one of Chan's pallbearers.

In 2023, Pun made his first solo directorial effort with One More Chance, which featured a screenplay by Chong and starred Chow Yun-fat. Tay Yek Keak of Today noted that Pun's background as a cinematographer "doubles as an effective tourist brochure with panoramic views of Macau's scenic sights"; while Edmund Lee of South China Morning Post described Pun's vision as "a rare attempt at a heartwarming drama". That same year, he also served as cinematographer for Jack Ng's A Guilty Conscience, which held the title of the highest-grossing domestic film in Hong Kong. He collaborated with Chong again on the 2023 crime drama film The Goldfinger, starring Tony Leung Chiu-wai and Andy Lau, for which he won Best Cinematography the second time in the 42nd Hong Kong Film Awards. Keith Ho, writing for HK01, praised the film's cinematography as "brilliant", crediting Pun for bringing back "the dazzling era of Hong Kong to the big screen".

In 2024, Pun made his second solo directorial effort while also serving as the cinematographer for the disaster film Cesium Fallout, the first feature film from Hong Kong centered around a radiation crisis. James Marsh of Deadline Hollywood noted that Pun's dual role ensured "that the unfolding mayhem retains a visual coherence", acknowledging his ability to strike a balance between disastrous scenes and images that resonate with the preceding pandemic and protests, serving as a political satire packaged with "boisterous, breathless" vibes; while Edmund Lee of South China Morning Post also commended Pun for effectively blending "firefighting action, government workplace bureaucracy, nefarious business practices and epic effects sequences", which "vividly picture the city in ruins". He also cinematographed the drama film The Last Dance that year, where Richard Kuipers of Variety particularly praised Pun's "polished cinematography in Hong Kong's Hung Hom funeral district", which made the film capable of "making lists of memorable movie funeral scenes". In 2026, Pun cinematographed the comedy film Night King and the crime thriller film Cold War 1994.

== Filmography ==
=== As director ===
Year	Title	Director	Cinematographer	Notes
2017	Extraordinary Mission	Yes	Yes	
2023	One More Chance	Yes	No	
2024	Cesium Fallout	Yes	Yes	

=== As cinematographer ===
Year	Title	Notes
1994	Lanterns	
1999	Gen-X Cops	
2000	Gen-Y Cops	
2001	La Brassiere	
2002	Demi-Haunted	
2003	Heroic Duo	
2004	Leaving Me, Loving You	
2004	New Police Story	
2005	Divergence	
2006	Rob-B-Hood	
2007	Invisible Target	
2008	Connected	
2009	Empire of Silver	
2009	Overheard	
2010	Triple Tap	
2011	10+10	Segment: 100
2011	Overheard 2	
2012	The Silent War	
2013	The White Storm	
2014	Overheard 3	
2015	Little Big Master	
2015	Monster Hunt	
2018	Monster Hunt 2	
2019	Bodies at Rest	
2021	Anita	
2023	A Guilty Conscience	
2023	The Goldfinger	
2024	The Last Dance	
2026	Night King	
2026	Cold War 1994	

== Awards and nominations ==
Year	Award	Category	Work	Result	Ref.
2004	23rd Hong Kong Film Awards	Best Cinematography	Heroic Duo	Nominated	
2005	24th Hong Kong Film Awards	Best Cinematography	Leaving Me, Loving You	Nominated	
2005	42nd Golden Horse Awards	Best Cinematography	Divergence	Won	
2009	27th Golden Rooster Awards	Best Cinematography	Empire of Silver	Nominated	
2010	29th Hong Kong Film Awards	Best Cinematography	Empire of Silver	Nominated	
2012	31st Hong Kong Film Awards	Best Cinematography	Overheard 2	Nominated	
2013	32nd Hong Kong Film Awards	Best Cinematography	The Silent War	Won	
2014	33rd Hong Kong Film Awards	Best Cinematography	The White Storm	Nominated	
2015	34th Hong Kong Film Awards	Best Cinematography	Overheard 3	Nominated	
2019	38th Hong Kong Film Awards	Best Cinematography	Monster Hunt 2	Nominated	
2022	40th Hong Kong Film Awards	Best Cinematography	Anita	Nominated	
2024	42nd Hong Kong Film Awards	Best Cinematography	The Goldfinger	Won	
2025	43rd Hong Kong Film Awards	Best Cinematography	The Last Dance	Nominated	
2025	43rd Hong Kong Film Awards	Best Cinematography	Cesium Fallout	Nominated	
