= Independent Schools Foundation Academy =

Bilingual private school in Hong Kong

The Independent Schools Foundation Academy
- 弘立書院
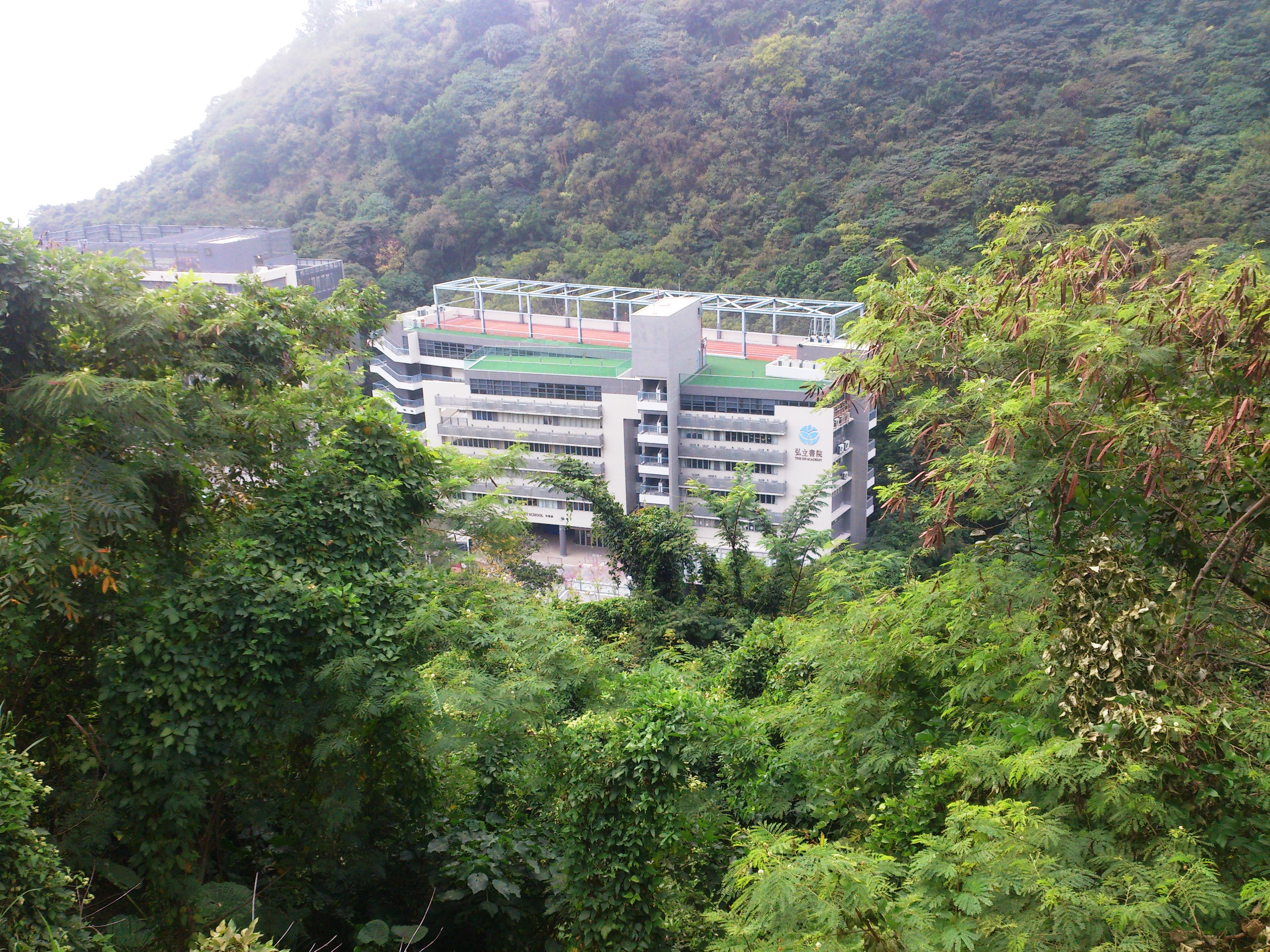
- 1 Kong Sin Wan Road, Pokfulam; Hong Kong SAR; China

Information
- Type: Private School
- Motto: Independent · Chinese · Global
- Established: 2003
- Closed: N/A
- School district: Pokfulam
- Head of school: Dr. Malcolm Pritchard
- Faculty: 400
- Grades: Foundation Year to Grade 12
- Enrollment: over 2000
- Average class size: 20
- Student to teacher ratio: 7:1
- Language: English, Chinese (Optional, French, Spanish, Latin)
- Area: approximately 13,152 square meters
- Campus type: Urban
- Houses: Metal House, Wood House, Water House, Fire House, and Earth House
- Colours: Blue, Black, White
- Sports: Wushu
- Mascot: Qilin
- Tuition: Primary School (Foundation Year to Grade 5): HK$240,320. Secondary School (Grade 6 to 10): HK$279,210. Secondary School (Grade 11 and 12): HK$303,530.
- Website: academy.isf.edu.hk

The Independent Schools Foundation Academy (The ISF Academy) is a non-profit bilingual (Mandarin and English) private independent school in Hong Kong. It is also an IBO World School, and offers the IB Middle Years Programme and Diploma Programme (IBDP). Unlike some Hong Kong schools with selective IBDP placement, at ISF Academy, the IBDP is mandatory for all students of grade 11 to 12. The current campus is in Cyberport, Pokfulam, Hong Kong.

== History ==
The Independent Schools Foundation was established in January 2000 as a registered charitable organisation. The school was co-founded by Charles Kao and Frances Wong. In 2003, the foundation established a non-profit, private independent school, the Independent Schools Foundation Academy (The ISF Academy), from Foundation Year to Grade 12 to cater for Mandarin and English education. The school is notable for its promotion of Mandarin education, which usually results in the grade 12 students graduating with an IBDP bilingual diploma.

In August 2003, the school began its temporary campus in Wanchai, with 56 students in Grades 1 to 4. It set up a second temporary campus in Causeway Bay before moving to a new campus in Pokfulam in July 2007.

In February 2007, the school commenced its Foundation Year program, a preparatory year for students prior to Grade 1. The academic year 2007–08 marked the first full year of its Foundation Year program.

== Campus ==
The campus opened in August 2007, in the Kong Sin Wan Tsuen Valley in Pokfulam, within the Island South District of Hong Kong Island, on a 13,152 sq. meter site, with over 20,000 pieces of metal used as well as to preserve the historical monument on the road nearby.

== Student life ==
The ISF Academy has a wide range of student life activities and student-led organizations, clubs and societies. Some of these organizations have achieved local and even international impact. For instance, Qirui Pay is a student-developed application that has widespread usage in ISF academy, eventually leading to it being chosen as the school-endorsed digital transaction platform for carnivals and fundraising events (such as JAM day secondary service market).
