= Ray Yeung =

Hong Kong screenwriter and film director

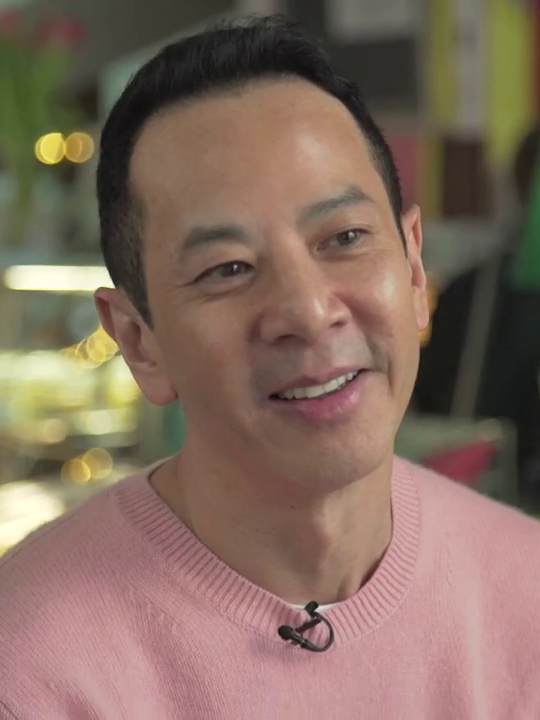
- Yeung in 2020
- Born: Raymond Yeung Yaw-kae
- Education: University of Canterbury (LLB); Columbia University School of the Arts (MFA)
- Known for: Suk Suk (2019)

Chinese name
- Traditional Chinese: 楊曜愷
Transcriptions

Ray Yeung (Chinese: 楊曜愷) is a Hong Kong screenwriter and independent film director. After graduating with a law degree and practicing law for two years, Yeung found his job tedious and decided to switch career paths to become a director. Yeung's films frequently center around gay stories. He made his feature film debut with Cut Sleeve Boys (2006) in Britain and later shifted his focus back to Hong Kong, directing Suk Suk (2020) and All Shall Be Well (2024). Yeung is also the Chairman of the Hong Kong Lesbian and Gay Film Festival, the longest running LGBT film festival in Asia. He revived the festival in 2000.

== Early life ==
Born in 1964, Yeung grew up in Hong Kong. At the age 13, he was sent to an English boarding school outside of London. He was the only Asian student at school and faced severe bullying. Upon his family's request, he went on to read law at the University of Canterbury. After graduating with a Bachelor of Laws, he began his career as a lawyer. He practiced law in the United Kingdom for two years before realizing that the profession was too tedious for him. He decided to switch career paths and become an advertising director. He enrolled at Columbia University School of the Arts to study filmmaking in 2008, and obtained a Master of Fine Arts in 2013.

== Career ==
Yeung wrote the plays Banana Skin and The Third Sex. He made several shorts prior to his feature film debut.

Yeung made his feature film debut with Cut Sleeve Boys, a gay love story between two Chinese-British men, in 2005 at the International Film Festival Rotterdam. The film won Best Feature at the Outfest Fusion Festival in Los Angeles and Best Actor for Chowee Leow at the Madrid Lesbian and Gay Film Festival.

His second feature film Front Cover premiered at the 2015 Seattle International Film Festival. The story follows Ryan Fu, a gay Chinese American fashion stylist (Jake Choi), who rejects his ethnic heritage, and is assigned to style Ning (James Chen), an ostensibly heterosexual patriotic actor from Beijing. Front Cover won Best Screenplay at FilmOut San Diego, Jury Award for Best Domestic Feature at the Outflix Film Festival in Memphis and Audience Award at the Boston Asian American Film Festival.

Yeung had expressed interest in doing a Cantonese-language film set in Hong Kong, having grown up there until age 13. Twilight's Kiss, or Suk Suk, is a film about a gay relationship between two elderly men in Hong Kong and was inspired by the book “Oral Histories of Older Gay Men in Hong Kong” by Hong Kong University Professor Travis S.K. Kong. The film premiered at the Busan International Film Festival in 2019. The film had its European Premiere at the Berlin International Film Festival 2020. Suk Suk is his first Chinese-language film. It was awarded Best Film at the 2019 Hong Kong Film Critics Society Award and numerous other awards and nominations from 2019- 2022. He was also presented with the Artist of the Year for Film award from the Hong Kong Arts Development Council in 2021.

In 2024, Yeung directed another LGBT-themed drama film All Shall Be Well, the film won a Teddy Award and Yeung was nominated for Best Director in the 61st Golden Horse Awards.

== Style and influences ==
Yeung cites directors Yasujirō Ozu and Stanley Kwan as his influences.

== Filmography ==
Year	Title	Notes
1995	A Chink in the Armour	
1996	A Bridge to the Past	
1998	Yellow Fever	
2006	Cut Sleeve Boys	
2008	Doggy... Doggy...	
2010	Derek and Lucas	
2011	Entwine	
2012	Paper Wrap Fire	
2015	Front Cover	
2019	Suk Suk (Twilight's Kiss)	
2024	All Shall Be Well	

== Awards and nominations ==
Year	Award	Category	Work	Result	Notes
2019	56th Golden Horse Awards	Best Original Screenplay	Twilight's Kiss (Suk Suk)	Nominated	
2019	56th Golden Horse Awards	Best Feature Film	Twilight's Kiss (Suk Suk)	Nominated	
2020	70th Berlin International Film Festival	Best Feature Film	Twilight's Kiss (Suk Suk)	Nominated	
2020	39th Hong Kong Film Awards	Best Director	Twilight's Kiss (Suk Suk)	Nominated	
2020	39th Hong Kong Film Awards	Best Screenplay	Twilight's Kiss (Suk Suk)	Nominated	
2020	Hong Kong Screenwriters’ Guild Awards	Best Screenplay	Twilight's Kiss (Suk Suk)	Won	
2020	Hong Kong Screenwriters’ Guild Awards	Best Director	Twilight's Kiss (Suk Suk)	Nominated	
2020	Hong Kong Film Critics Society Award	Best Screenplay	Twilight's Kiss (Suk Suk)	Nominated	
2020	Hong Kong Film Critics Society Award	Best Director	Twilight's Kiss (Suk Suk)	Nominated	
2020	Hong Kong Film Critics Society Award	Best Film	Twilight's Kiss (Suk Suk)	Won	
2020	39th Hong Kong Film Awards	Best Picture	Twilight's Kiss (Suk Suk)	Nominated	
2020	39th Hong Kong Film Awards	Best Screenplay	Twilight's Kiss (Suk Suk)	Nominated	
2020	39th Hong Kong Film Awards	Best Director	Twilight's Kiss (Suk Suk)	Nominated	
2020	Renaissance Awards	Best Drama	Twilight's Kiss (Suk Suk)	Won	
2020	Kongest Film Awards	Best Film	Twilight's Kiss (Suk Suk)	Won	
2020	To Ten Chinese Films Festival	Youth Film Handbook: Outstanding Film	Twilight's Kiss (Suk Suk)	Won	
2020	Out on Film: Atlanta's LGBT Film Festival	Jury Award: Best International Film	Twilight's Kiss (Suk Suk)	Won	
2020	Out on Film: Atlanta's LGBT Film Festival	Audience Award: Best International Film	Twilight's Kiss (Suk Suk)	Won	
2020	Florence Queer Film Festival	Best Long Feature Film	Twilight's Kiss (Suk Suk)	Won	
2020	Festival International du Film Independent de Bordeaux	Special Mention: Best International Feature Film	Twilight's Kiss (Suk Suk)	Won	
2020	GAZE Film Festival Dublin	Audience Award: Best Feature	Twilight's Kiss (Suk Suk)	Won	
2020	Seoul International Pride Film Festival	Best Asian Feature	Twilight's Kiss (Suk Suk)	Won	
2020	Asian American International Film Festival	Audience Choice Award: Best Narrative Film	Twilight's Kiss (Suk Suk)	Won	
2020	Tel Aviv International LGBT Film Festival	Honorable Mention: Best Feature	Twilight's Kiss (Suk Suk)	Won	
2020	Brussels International Film Festival	Grand Prix du Festival Award	Twilight's Kiss (Suk Suk)	Nominated	
2020	Chicago International Film Festival	Gold Q- Hugo Award	Twilight's Kiss (Suk Suk)	Nominated	
2021	Zinegoak Festival, Bilbao Spain	Special Mention: Best Feature Film	Twilight's Kiss (Suk Suk)	Won	
2021	La Mostra Internacional de Cinema de Gai i Lesbià FIRE!!	Audience Award: Best Feature	Twilight's Kiss (Suk Suk)	Won	
2021	LGBT Film Fest of the Niemeyer Center, Spain	Jury Award: Best Feature Film	Twilight's Kiss (Suk Suk)	Won	
2021	Santo Domingo OutFest - Festival Internacional de Cine GLBT	Jury Award: Best Film	Twilight's Kiss (Suk Suk)	Won	
2021	Santo Domingo OutFest - Festival Internacional de Cine GLBT	Jury Award: Best Screenplay	Twilight's Kiss (Suk Suk)	Won	
2022	Queerties Awards 2022	Best Indie Movie	Twilight's Kiss (Suk Suk)	Nominated	
2022	GLAAD Media Awards 2022	Outstanding Feature - Limited Release	Twilight's Kiss (Suk Suk)	Nominated	
2024	Teddy Award 2024	Best Feature Film	All Shall Be Well	Won	
2024	Berlinale Panorama	Audience Award	All Shall Be Well	Won	
2024	61st Golden Horse Awards	Best Director	All Shall Be Well	Pending	
