= Papa (2024 film) =

2024 Hong Kong film by Philip Yung

- Theatrical release poster
- Traditional Chinese: 爸爸
- Literal meaning: Father
- Jyutping: Baa^{1} Baa^{1}
- Directed by: Philip Yung (Note: According to the film's end credits, Philip Yung was credited as the director and Au Cheuk-man as the co-director. When the film was submitted for awards, the production team nominated only Yung as the director, which Au agreed to. Yung was shortlisted for Best Director at the Hong Kong Film Critics Society Awards, ultimately winning in January 2025, but the Hong Kong Film Critics Society faced criticism for excluding Au Cheuk-man from the nomination despite his credited role. On 3 February, the Society issued a press release clarifying that they received a letter from producer Amy Chin during the film's submission process, explaining that the production team had reached a consensus that Yung would be the sole director. Chin also attached a handwritten letter from Au, reinstating that his role was merely supportive and that he believed Yung should be credited as the sole director of Papa. Later that month, the Hong Kong Film Awards announced their nominations, including both Philip Yung and Au Cheuk-man for Best Director for Papa. The Awards clarified that they prioritised the filmmakers' interests and would rely on the film's end credits to determine nominees, thus shortlisting both Yung and Au. Yung subsequently responded to the Awards' statements, expressing understanding of their concerns and stating that he would not make any further comments to contest their decision.)
- Written by: Philip Yung
- Produced by: Amy Chin
- Starring: Sean Lau; Jo Koo; Dylan So; Lainey Hung
- Cinematography: Chin Ting-chang
- Edited by: Jojo Shek
- Music by: Ding Ke
- Production company: Word by Word
- Distributed by: Golden Scene
- Release dates: 31 October 2024 (Tokyo); 5 December 2024 (Hong Kong)
- Running time: 131 minutes
- Country: Hong Kong
- Language: Cantonese
- Budget: HK$7.2 million
- Box office: HK$23 million

Papa (Chinese: 爸爸) is a 2024 Hong Kong family drama film directed and written by Philip Yung. Produced by Word by Word and distributed by Golden Scene, it is based on the real-life 2010 Heung Wo Street Murder, in which a mentally unstable son killed his mother and sister, leaving his father as the sole survivor. With Sean Lau, Jo Koo, Dylan So, and Lainey Hung portraying the family, the film is set in the aftermath of the murder and follows the father (Lau) as he navigates survivor guilt and seeks reconciliation with his son (So).

Philip Yung was initially attached to the adaptation of the Heung Wo Street Murder as the screenwriter in 2011, interviewing the surviving father Kan Fuk-kui in person and beginning to write the screenplay in 2012. Development stalled when the director dropped out of the project after 2013. Yung later bought the screenplay and took on the role of director after filming Port of Call (2015). Pre-production and rewrites continued until 2022, when investment was secured. Principal photography commenced in March 2023, shot in a 4:3 aspect ratio, primarily in To Kwa Wan, with additional filming in Tsuen Wan and Sham Shui Po.

Papa had its world premiere in competition for the Tokyo Sakura Grand Prix at the 37th Tokyo International Film Festival on 31 October 2024, followed by a theatrical release in Hong Kong on 5 December. The film became the ninth highest-grossing Hong Kong film of 2024 and received generally positive reviews from critics, particularly for Sean Lau's performance and the emotional depth, but its fragmented narrative elicited both praise and criticism. It garnered various accolades, including 11 nominations in the 43rd Hong Kong Film Awards, and Lau won a Hong Kong Film Award, an Asian Film Award, and an Asia Pacific Screen Award for his performance.

== Plot ==
The film adapts a nonlinear narrative: Nin starts a usual work day at his cha chaan teng, a Hong Kong restaurant he owns, interrupted by the revelations delivered by his colleagues and neighbours that his son Ming has murdered his wife Yin and daughter Grace, and subsequently turned himself in to the police. Sometime later, Nin sells the cha chaan teng to one of his waiters, no longer wanting to see the place that brings back painful memories. He attends his son's trial, where Ming confesses and reveals that he committed the murders because he heard a voice telling him he has a mission to eliminate a portion of the population and save the world. One night, Nin has dinner with his mother and his sister's family, where he lies about his family to his mother, saying that they are busy, but his mother reveals that she has known what happened all along. Nin recalls meeting Yin in 1993, when both families object to their engagement. Despite this, Nin insists on marrying Yin, and they soon welcome their first son.

Nin visits Ming in prison. He asks him to apply for a pardon to increase the number of visits he can have, but Ming refuses. Lonely at home with their house cat Carnation, Nin tries to hire a door-to-door prostitute, but after she deceives him and sneaks away with his payment, he becomes frustrated and experiences an emotional breakdown. During a family therapy session, Nin and Ming talk under the guidance of a psychiatrist. Nin demands an explanation from Ming for why he killed their loved ones, while Ming finally reveals his true thoughts, admitting he thinks Nin never listened to what his family wanted to say.

Before the murders, Yin asks Nin to stop running their restaurant 24/7, but he refuses. One day, Grace brings home a stray cat, naming it Carnation, and insists on keeping it despite Ming's objections toward limiting the animal's freedom. However, Grace soon loses interest in Carnation, and their busy parents leave Ming to take care for it. Carnation goes missing once, and Ming, worried, carefully rescues it after finding it on the edge of the corridor window. During summer, Ming works at Nin's restaurant clashing with Nin when he refuses to use the packing method his father's staff taught him and causes a mess. Ming asks Nin to buy him a new phone with photography functions, but Nin refuses, claiming multifunctional phones are prone to malfunction. Instead, he buys a camera, which Ming insists he does not want. Using his summer job salary, Ming buys the phone himself. During a family trip to Hainan, his mother discovers the phone and gives him back the money he spent on it, but only waits until Nin is asleep, as she does not object to Ming's purchase but avoids to go against her husband, leaving Ming puzzled as to why she will not just discuss it with Nin.

By 2013, Ming has been locked in the psychiatric hospital for four years. His request for early release is denied, even though Nin wishes to reunite with his son and expresses his willingness to care for Ming full-time now that he is retired. Realizing he may not be released anytime soon, Ming writes a letter to Nin, apologising for his actions and asking his father to visit him on his 18th birthday, which Nin does but refuses to discuss the murders during their reunion. Years later, when Ming is finally released, he is already an adult. He returns to his old home and has lunch with his father, with the film ending as Ming looks at their family photo.

== Cast ==
- Sean Lau as Nin Yuen, a 24-hour cha chaan teng owner whose wife and daughter were murdered by his son
- Jo Koo as Yin, Nin's Hakka wife and Ming and Grace's mother
- Dylan So as Ming, Nin's son who has schizophrenia
- Lainey Hung as Grace, Nin's daughter and Ming's younger sister

Also appearing in the film are Yeung Wai-lun as Salty, a waiter at Nin's restaurant; Helen Tam as Dr. Lee, Ming's psychiatrist; Law Wing-cheung as Keung, Nin's brother-in-law; Chan Lai-wun as Nin's mother; Mak Pui-tung as Mr. Lee, Ming's liberal studies teacher; and Tung Fong-shing as Junior, a fellow restaurant owner acquainted with Nin. Cameo appearances include Tai Bo as Uncle Kim, Ming's fellow inmate; Hui So-ying as a fishmonger, Edan Lui as the adult version of Ming; and John Shum as the chairman of the prison sentences review board. The house cat Carnation was portrayed by director Philip Yung's pet cat Siufa.

== Production ==
=== Background ===
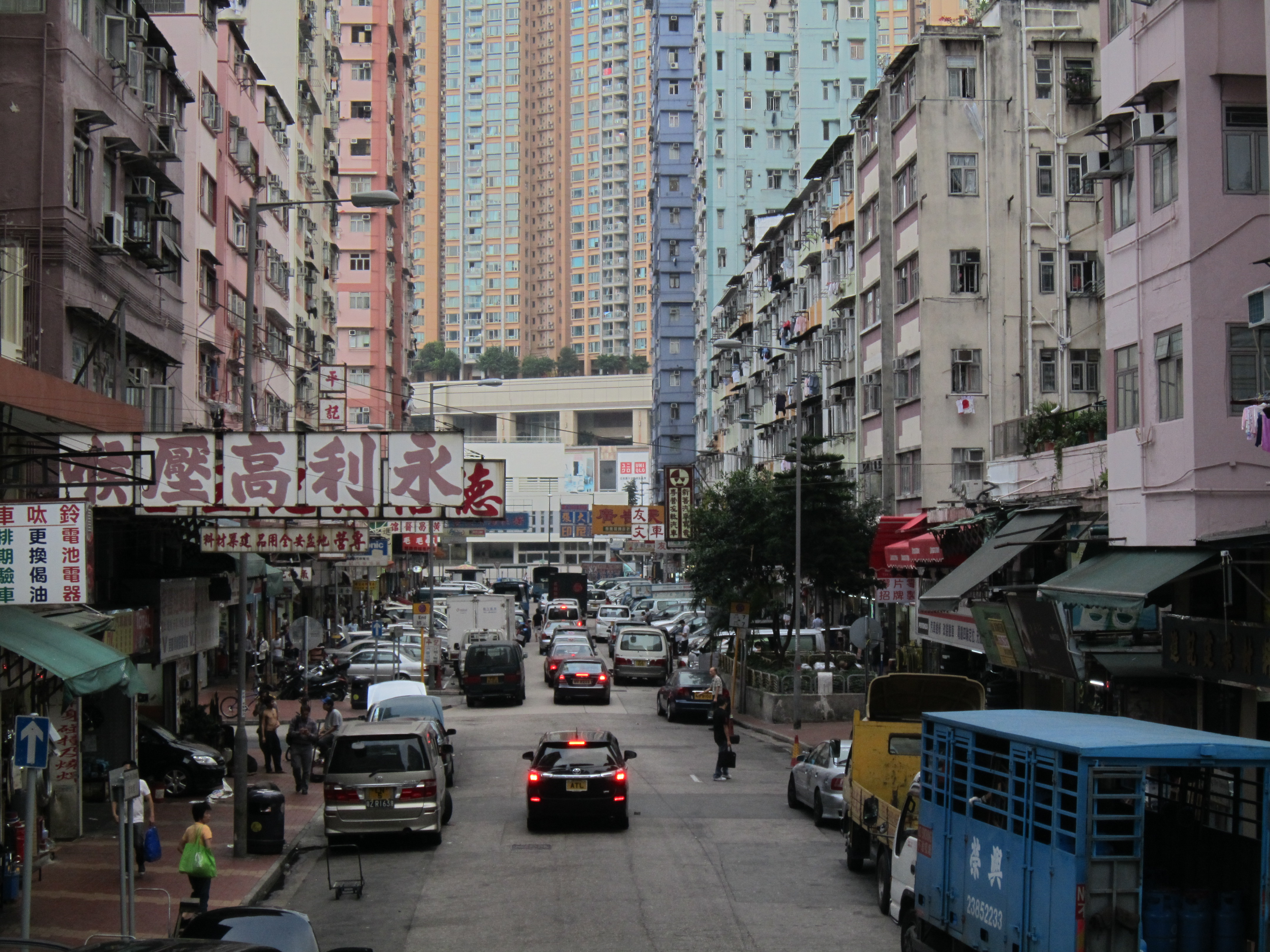
Papa is based on a 2010 murder at Heung Wo Street, Tsuen Wan.

The story of Papa is based on the 2010 Heung Wo Street Murder. On 22 July 2010, a 15-year-old teenager Kan Ka-leung murdered his mother Lam Lin-kam and his younger sister Kan Chung-yue at home, before turning himself in to the police after wandering the streets for a short period. The family, which included the father Kan Fuk-kui, lived together on Heung Wo Street in Tsuen Wan. Kan Fuk-kui used to work as a chicken butcher before opening a cha chaan teng called Fan Fan Ho Restaurant in 2004 directly opposite their apartment. After having a family dinner at their restaurant on the night of the murder, the mother and children returned home while Kan Fuk-kui stayed behind to run the restaurant, thus escaping the murder. Kan Ka-leung was tried and convicted for manslaughter in 2012. His psychological assessment diagnosed him with schizophrenia and revealed that he suffered from auditory hallucinations during the murder, hearing voices told him to eliminate part of the population on a mission to solve the problem of overpopulation, resources waste and harm to environment. Before Papa's release, Kan Ka-leung's mental condition had improved following years of therapy, and he was released from detainment at the Siu Lam Psychiatric Centre, continuing his treatment at Castle Peak Hospital. Kan Fuk-kui had sold the restaurant in August 2012 and moved out of the apartment where the murder occurred.

=== Conception ===
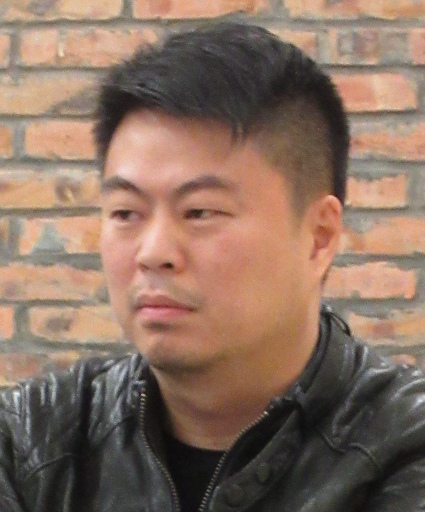
Director-screenwriter Philip Yung

In 2011, Philip Yung was invited to join the adaptation of the Heung Wo Street Murder as the screenwriter, after an undisclosed director was impressed by his screenplay draft which later evolved into Port of Call (2015). Yung, who grew up in Tsuen Wan and lived nearby Heung Wo Street, was already familiar with the murder case before the film's production and cited his familiarity with the crime scene as essential for capturing the film's sense of place. To research the screenplay, Yung personally approached the surviving father Kan Fuk-kui with assistance from then-district councilor Leung Yiu-chung and solicitor Mary Jean Reimer to hear his story. Yung felt that Kan initially was defensive and reluctant to have his story adapted, as he did not want the public to cast judgement on his son. Originally, Yung planned to adapt the murder into a true crime film involving mysticism, as he found newspaper articles that mentioned occult symbols being found outside the Kans' apartment. However, he scrapped this idea after speaking with Kan, realising that there were no mysteries in the murder, but rather "the devastation of a father unable to understand his son".

Kan eventually softened his stance upon finding that Yung was more interested in adapting the film as a personal story from the father's perspective rather than focusing solely on the murder, and was willing to listen to Kan's inner thoughts. He later agreed to have his story adapted and provided necessary details to the production team. For instance, the film included scenes of the father writing letters to his deceased wife, inspired by real advice from psychiatrist David Tsang to Kan as a form of narrative therapy. Yung stated that his motivation for creating the film was to raise awareness of families affected by mental disorders and to demonstrate how to process emotions for Hongkongers. Au Cheuk-man, a filmmaker and friend of Philip Yung, accompanied him in the interviews with Kan and contributed to the scriptwriting process, suggesting the inclusion of a birthing scene and a funeral scene. Yung credited Au as co-director in recognition of his contributions to the film. Yung also interviewed several experts and researched materials related to mental disorders, even though it was not a theme explored in depth in the film, to accurately depict it and avoid stigmatisation or discrimination against those affected.

=== Pre-production ===
"I'm crazy about exploring the presentation of time onscreen. I studied the homicide case through and through and found that the father's memories were jumpy. It's almost like he was remembering things from a stream of consciousness. When he recalled the whole story [to the court], his memories were jumbled up and in bits and pieces. So how do I present his chaotic emotions? I used objects and scenarios as triggers for the father's memory. It's a journey of how he combs through the past and tries to make peace."

— Philip Yung on adopting a nonlinear narrative for the screenplay of Papa

The screenplay began development in 2012. Adopting a narrative style similar to that of Port of Call and Where the Wind Blows (2022), Yung used a stream of consciousness and wrote the screenplay from the father's perspective, focusing on his navigation of the aftermath of the murder while the arcs of the other characters unfolded around him. Disjointed flashbacks were incorporated into the screenplay, as Yung aimed to replicate human memories that "do not function linearly and can be fragmented". Instead of fragmenting the narrative in post-production editing, he opted for a nonlinear structure during the scripting stage, as in his interviews with Kan Fuk-kui, Kan spoke about his experiences in a fragmented manner, which Yung described as "pieces of a puzzle", with each piece offering a different view of time and fate. Yung characterised Papa as a "family story", using murder only as a means to explore human nature, citing Seichō Matsumoto's novels as an inspiration for the film's genre approach, where he aimed to incorporate elements of social school mystery to examine familial relationships and values within Hong Kong society. Mikio Naruse's Mother (1952) was also cited as an influence on both the film's aesthetics and the subtle emotions translated through family members' interactions. Yung included a house cat in the story, drawing from his personal experiences of having a cat, and he believed that keeping a pet would enrich the father's life. Writing was completed in 2013, but the project was subsequently stalled in development when the director dropped out to work on a Hong Kong-Chinese film. Yung, still fond of the screenplay and feeling confident in his filmmaking skills after making Port of Call, reached out to the director and had been in talks for seven to eight years to buy back his script.

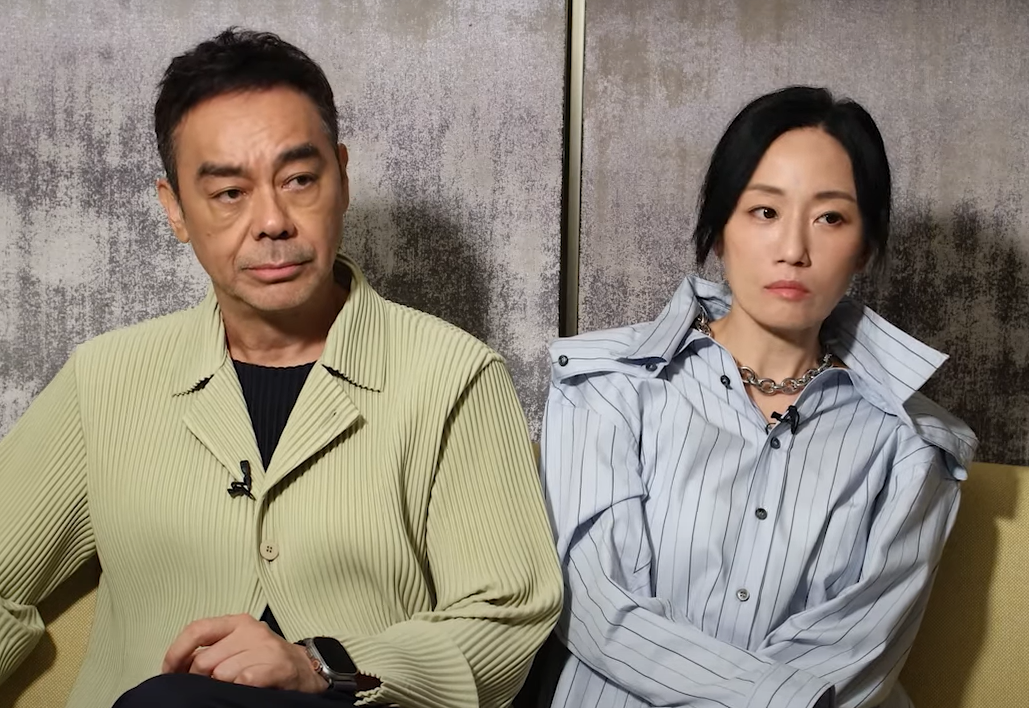
Sean Lau (left) and Jo Koo interviewed by am730

In 2016, Jo Koo, a friend of Philip Yung, read the screenplay after Yung requested her feedback while searching for potential investors, but they did not discuss collaboration. After Yung confirmed the film's production, he approached Koo for the role of the mother, before Sean Lau was cast as the titular father. Although Yung initially considered a mainland Chinese actress for the role, since the character is a new immigrant, he ultimately decided against it to maintain the authenticity of the cast's dynamic. He cast Koo because he believed she embodied a charisma that was "both gentle and strong", similar to his own mother. Koo, who established a charity fund for mental illness with her paternal uncle Vincent Kok, accepted the role to raise awareness about mental illness, and because of her own experiences as a mother. To prepare for her role as a Hakka native, Koo learned Hakka language for three days from Yung's relative. (Note: There are conflicting reports regarding who taught Jo Koo Hakka, with am730 stating it was Yung's cousin, while East Week stating it was Yung's aunt.) Yung considered Sean Lau the top choice for the role of the father since the casting began, noting the strong contrast in Lau's appearance and personality, which suited the character. He also observed that, despite Lau's diverse roles, he rarely had been cast in more artistically nuanced performances since C'est la vie, mon chéri (1993), and he aimed to set a precedent for young filmmakers. Lau was initially hesitant about the character, describing the screenplay as "heavy", and did not want to portray a tragic figure who had to face the death of his children. However, Yung insisted on casting Lau and waited three years for his agreement, during which investors suggested changing the lead actor, but Yung refused. Lau ultimately accepted the role, finding the screenplay "well-written" after re-reading it multiple times and appreciating that it was not simply a story of "good versus evil", viewing the role as a "good challenge". Approaching the character, Lau intentionally minimised his preparation work due to the film's realistic tone, where he only transcribed the lyrics of the theme song and the biographical sketches of the son and daughter to immerse himself in the role. A culinary coach was hired for Lau, who did not know how to cook, to help him prepare for his role as a cha chaan teng owner and learn to make soy sauce chicken. Lau voluntarily lowered his salary due to the film's budget constraints.

Yung held auditions and screened over a hundred actors but was unable to find a suitable candidate for the role of the son. Dylan So, an 18-year-old high-schooler with no prior acting experience was subsequently recommended to Yung by his mother's friend, who worked at Yung's production company. After seeing So's photo, Yung felt that his demeanor matched his vision for the character and cast him in the role. While acting, So did not try to imitate a mentally disordered person or a murderer, and he instead drew on his own experiences with his parents during puberty. Lau tried to collaborate with So and another child actress Lainey Hung (who played the daughter Grace) while providing them room for creative freedom, with many of their interactions and dialogues improvised on set. Yeung Wai-lun, the lead actor from The Sparring Partner (2022) produced by Yung, returned to star in this film and offered advice to So on portraying a murderer. Wing Mo, who worked with Yung as the acting coach for The Sparring Partner, also reprised her position. Cameo appearances by Hui So-ying, John Shum, and Tai Bo were featured, with Yung explaining that he cast these actors based on the characteristics that the audience was most familiar with, aiming to evoke a sense of nostalgia for past Hong Kong cinema. For instance, Hui, whose break-out role was as a fishmonger in Ah Ying (1983), again played a fishmonger, while Shum, whom Yung described as "an established figure in the filmmaking industry", was cast as an authoritative character.

Funding was secured approximately six to seven years after the release of Port of Call, which Yung noted that the film initially struggled to attract investment because its title was deemed "not commercial enough". Yung continued to refine the screenplay until 2022, aiming to differentiate the story from Port of Call, despite both films revolving around murder, and rewrote the screenplay incorporating his personal experiences following the death of a family member and the changing social atmosphere. In June 2022, the film was greenlit as part of the Hong Kong Film Development Council's Operation Greenlight with a budget of HK$7,246,400 through the Film Production Financing Scheme, with Sean Lau and Jo Koo announcing as the lead cast and Amy Chin producing. After producing The Sparring Partner, Yung found himself in debt and had to make a low-budget Chinese romance film, Penny Pinchers (2024), to repay it while on holiday that same year and postponed Papa's production. He returned to Hong Kong to direct Papa right afterwards, a film he described as a real "Hong Kong film", in contrast to Penny Pinchers, which he characterised as a "very mainland Chinese film". In February 2023, Ming Pao reported that production on an adaptation of the Heung Wo Street Murder was set to begin, coinciding with the box office success of the courtroom drama A Guilty Conscience (2023). Yung teased the production of the project in the same month, describing it as a "small-scale art-house film" and expressing uncertainty about whether it could be released in China. Jennifer Yu was reported to be part of the cast in March 2023.

=== Filming ===
Principal photography began in March 2023, with Taiwanese cinematographer Chin Ting-chang, who collaborated with Yung on Where the Wind Blows, helming the shoot. Sean Lau and Jennifer Yu reportedly joined the production on 17 March, with filming continuing through April. Lau took a hiatus to attend the 41st Hong Kong Film Awards on 16 April before returning to shoot the following day. The shoot wrapped up within the first half of the year.

Yung used a 4:3 aspect ratio during filming to create "the sensation of watching a home video rather than a feature film", enhancing the film's casual atmosphere and making it feel like "a glimpse into everyday life in a typical household". Yung initially opted for a 1.66:1 aspect ratio to achieve this effect based on recommendations from cinematographer Leung Ming-kai, but he found it did not convey the casual and everyday feel he was aiming for, so he switched to 4:3. He also included cotton-tree flowers in the background of several scenes, noting that this detail was not in the original script, but simply a result of the shoot coinciding with the cotton-tree blossoming and causing the falling cotton to "keep coming back into the shot". All but one scene in the film used eye-level camera angles, which Yung described as making the audience "feel as if they are standing next to or behind the characters" and allowed for a subjective interpretation of their lives, citing inspiration from Huang Hsin-yao's The Great Buddha+ (2017). A beach scenery shot in bird's-eye view was later added during the film's post-production, which Yung opposed, but the editor insisted on including it to create a distancing effect for the audience.

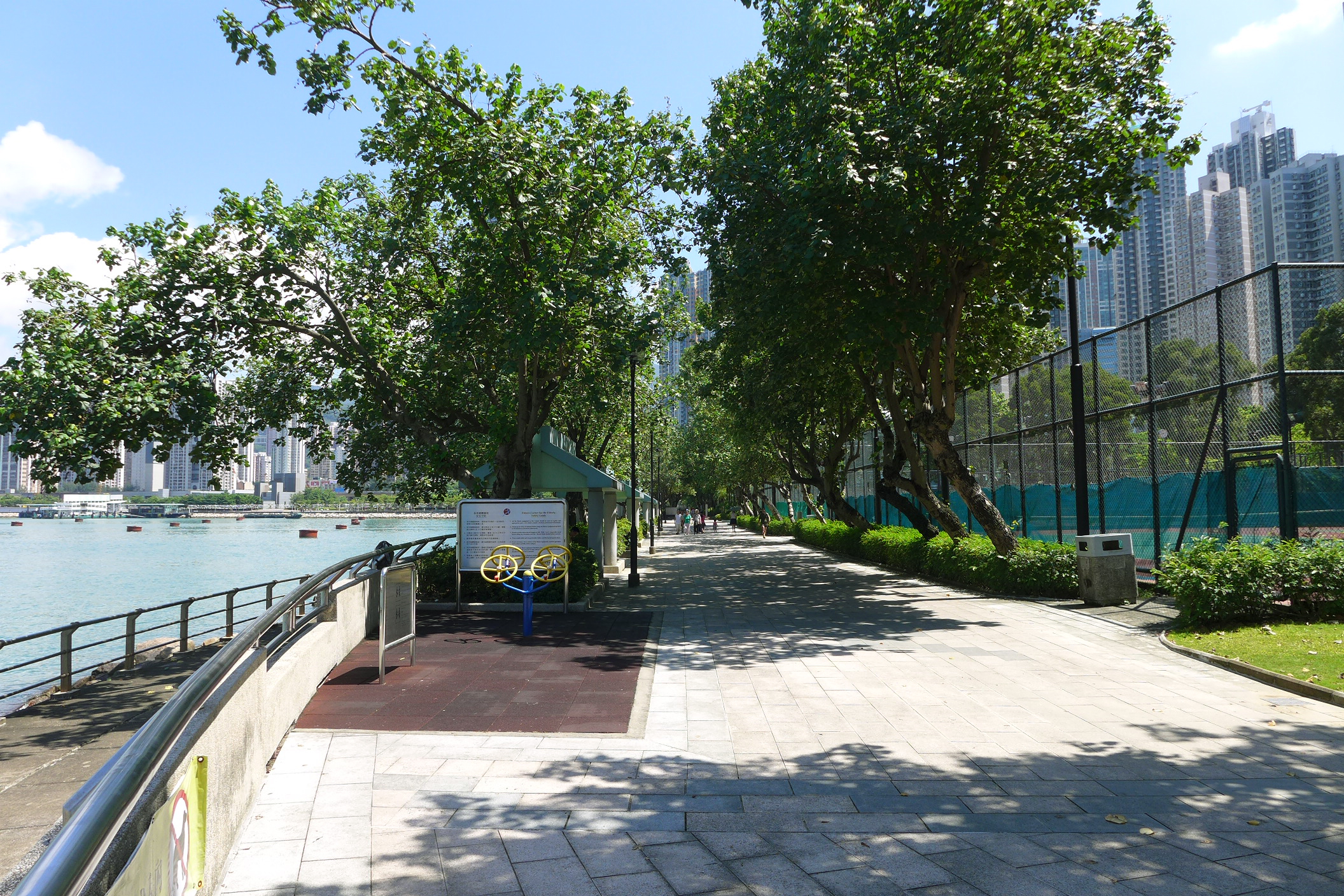
Tsuen Wan Riviera Park, where Kan Ka-leung fled and was arrested, served as a filming location.

Although the murder occurred on Heung Wo Street in Tsuen Wan, Yung opposed filming on location to avoid bringing back tragic memories for local residents. Instead, he primarily shot the film in To Kwa Wan, and used Mei King Street to represent Heung Wo Street. Yung chose Mei King Street because his production company's office was nearby, and he felt the landscape and architectural style of the tong laus there resembled those of Heung Wo Street. The cha chaan teng that was used as the backdrop for the Yuens' family restaurant was filmed at Mei King Restaurant, while the tong sui shop owned by Junior (played by Tung Fong-shing) was based on Kam Lo Dessert on the same street. The interior scenes of the Yuens' apartment were filmed in a tong lau on Boundary Street in Sham Shui Po, where the window views and police investigation scenes featuring the building's exterior were created with computer-generated imagery to blend with the scenery of Mei King Street during post-production. Yung originally did not intend to film the process of the son killing his mother and sister, as he became apprehensive about gory scenes after working on Port of Call. However, while on set, he found the atmosphere and the cast's emotional state deeply immersed in the situation, which led him to improvise the shoot. The scene where Ming fled after the murder was filmed on location at Tsuen Wan Riviera Park, in accordance with real-life events. Yung explained that he chose to film there because the park offers a unique view of the Rambler Channel that cannot be replicated elsewhere, and its sloped design gives the impression of "a cage trapping the murderer". Additional shooting in Tsuen Wan took place at the Yeung Uk Road Street Market and Cheung Shan Estate.

=== Post-production ===
Jojo Shek, who collaborated with Yung on The Sparring Partner, edited the film. The rough cut was completed by September 2023. Yung and Shek reached a consensus that the film's structure should focus on family rather than chronology, and used montage techniques to rearrange the scene sequences. They decided to use all five family members (including the house cat Carnation) as chapter titles, with each chapter centering on a specific family member while also connecting to the others. Yung cited the works of Milan Kundera as inspiration for this approach, describing it as a symphonic composition, where each chapter represents an orchestral section, and only when all sections come together can the audience fully understand how each family member influenced the father's consciousness. A flashback scene of the father teaching the son to ride a bicycle was presented in black-and-white, which Yung compared it to Zhu Ziqing's essay "Retreating Figure", explaining that he wanted to evoke a surrealistic sense and present an emotional image of a father who is both protective and caring while raising his son. Several cast members' scenes were entirely cut from the theatrical version due to length constraints.

In January 2024, the film was pitched to festival directors by Screen International alongside 14 Asian films, and was presented at the Hong Kong Filmart in March 2024. On 25 September, the film's teaser poster was released along with the announcement of its world premiere date. In November, a member of the Cantopop boy group Mirror was reported to have a cameo appearance, and Philip Yung revealed that it was Edan Lui in the same month. Lui's cameo scene was not included in the original screenplay and was added as a last-minute shoot, because Yung wanted to "add a touch of hope" at the end as he believed society was in greater need of it compared to the time when he was writing the screenplay. Yung met Lui while he was the lead in Secret in the Box (2026), another film Yung produced that year, and recognised his acting potential after watching him in three other films of various genres, inviting him to make a cameo.

=== Music ===
The film was scored by Chinese musician Ding Ke, and features Teddy Robin's 1981 song "This is Love" as the theme song, with characters singing it in various scenes. Yung chose the song for its sense of vintage, aiming to evoke the nostalgia of older Cantopop to resonate with the pasts of Sean Lau and Jo Koo's characters. Fung Ka-ming of Ming Pao noted that, much like Port of Call used Sammi Cheng's "Aerial View of My Life" to weave through the narrative, Papa's song choice echoed and captured the film's theme of love; while Cyrus Lamprecht from the Hong Kong Economic Times compared the film to Ann Hui's The Story of Woo Viet (1981), which also used the song as an intermezzo, observing that both films share a similar message about the protagonists letting go of their obsessions and freeing themselves from their tragedies.

== Themes ==
"To make sure that you and the other person are both comfortable when you're communicating is the biggest form of mercy, especially for a movie like Papa' that deals with an inescapable situation, sometimes beating around the bush and using a more comfortable method is best."

— Philip Yung on the film's theme of mercy

According to Philip Yung, the screenplay initially focused on the aspects of "tolerance", "letting go", and aimed to "further explore mercy". Unlike the typical approach to father-son relationships that focuses on conflicts of values, the conflict in Papa arises from the survivor guilt of the surviving father, who loves his family equally and cannot hate the son who murdered them. Writer Priscilla Ng echoed Yung's explanation, viewing the film's thematic centre in "relief", and noted that the father's repeated attempts to calm himself symbolise his struggle to maintain sanity amidst life's impermanence, and that only by embracing one's emotions can one find peace. Scholar Natalia Chan offered another perspective interpreting the film as a metaphor for contemporary Hong Kong society, where Yuens' home symbolises two opposite sentiments within Hong Kong society, marked by love for the place and desire to stay, despite tragedies and fractured relationships that cannot be easily forgotten.

Yung later subverted the film's theme of mercy in an interview with Ming Pao, stating that he found it more about "time" after reconsideration. He cited Yasumi Kobayashi's novella The Drunk Man as inspiration for this interpretation, explaining that without a concept of time, a person viewing their life as fragmented would not experience feelings of regret, remorse, and hope, much like the film's nonlinear narrative. He viewed the father's confusion in the film as a representation of how time allows for the reinterpretation and evolution of emotions, suggesting that there exists a stasis, "the chaotic vacuum", between present memories and memories fading into oblivion, and the film captures this in-between moment when a person wants to forget something they cannot yet let go of. Critics have also suggested that the father-son relationship in the film symbolises the generational divide in Hong Kong, although Yung has denied this interpretation.

== Release ==
Papa had its world premiere in competition for the Tokyo Sakura Grand Prix at the 37th Tokyo International Film Festival on 31 October 2024, and was screened as the closing film of the 21st Hong Kong Asian Film Festival. Distribution was managed by Golden Scene in Asia and Moebius Entertainment outside of Asia. The film premiered in Hong Kong at Olympian City, Tai Kok Tsui on 2 December 2024, and had its theatrical release in Hong Kong on 5 December. It received a nationwide release in Taiwan on 3 January 2025, followed by screenings in the United Kingdom on 28 February, distributed by Central City Media in over 25 locations and 60 cinemas. It was released in North America and Malaysia on 14 March and 12 June 2025 respectively. The film was also screened in competition at the 27th Far East Film Festival, the 24th New York Asian Film Festival, the 28th Shanghai International Film Festival, and as part of the Hong Kong Making Waves touring program in Lisbon and Paris. It is scheduled to be released nationwide in mainland China on 27 June 2026.

== Reception ==
=== Box office ===
Papa debuted with a gross of HK$1.93 million on its opening day, with am730 calling the figure "impressive" and Philip Yung expressing satisfaction with the numbers. It grossed HK$5 million by the third day of release, and climbed to HK$10 million after one week. The box office continued to surge, reaching HK$15 million by the second week, and finishing the third week with about HK$18.3 million. The film concluded 2024 with HK$19.6 million, and combined with its earnings in Macau, the total reached HK$20.2 million, making it the ninth highest-grossing Hong Kong film of the year. It finished its theatrical run with a total gross of HK$23 million, with Deadline Hollywood describing the overall box office performance as "encouraging". Film critic Li Cheuk-to observed that Papa, along with two other commercially successful 2024 Hong Kong films All Shall Be Well and The Last Dance, centered on the theme of mourning the deceased, suggesting that this theme has become a collective unconscious for Hongkongers and reflected the city's decline.

=== Critical response ===
Papa's critical reception was positive, with Screen International calling the film "critically acclaimed". South China Morning Post ranked it first out of the 36 Hong Kong films theatrically released in 2024. As of March 2025, the film held a rating of 7.5/10 on the Chinese media review platform Douban.

Richard Kuipers of Variety commended Papa for its "low-key presentation that creates high emotional impact" and its "great depth and complexity", particularly Sean Lau's "beautifully calibrated performance", which balances "crushing sorrow and anguish behind his apparently calm and measured exterior". Edmund Lee of the South China Morning Post gave the film 4/5 stars, applauding it as an "emotionally genuine slice-of-life drama" that explores grief and family love through Sean Lau's "rich and poignant" performance, and noting the artistic use of fragmented flashbacks and the square aspect ratio that deliver a "complex tale of unconditional family love". Whang Yee Ling also rated the film 4/5 stars in her review for The Straits Times, appreciating Lau's portrayal of the grieving father and the delivery of a "wrenching story" full of emotional weight through the piecing together of his fragmented memories and the box-like screen ratio.

Calvin Choi, writing for the Hong Kong Economic Times, described Yung's screenplay as "complex", acknowledging that it avoids the direction of 1990s Category III true crime films to instead explore the victim's emotions and familial love through the father's memories, with nuanced performances that allow the audience to experience the rollercoaster of feelings in the tragic aftermath alongside him. am730's Jonathan Hung also observed that Yung departed from the style of his previous crime thriller Port of Call (2015) and typical crime narratives, instead focusing on a father's journey of reconciliation through character-centric cinematography and nonlinear flashbacks, effectively capturing the complexities of loss and memory. Estella Huang echoed Hung's view in her review for Mirror Media, finding that Yung took an opposite approach from Port of Call by employing a purely artistic presentation style in Papa, which transcends sensationalism to examine universal human emotions and the impact of loss through unconventional plot progression and a "heartbreaking but unforgettable" performance by Lau.

The Hollywood Reporter's Jordan Mintzer characterised the film as "a kaleidoscope of impressions" that explores guilt and regret through an emotional journey from the father's perspective, while noting that its disoriented timeline and filming style "dulls the dramatic impact", yet ultimately praised Yung's "cerebral" direction for providing a complex reflection on handling grief. Keith Ho, reviewing for HK01, also described Papa as a "powerfully moving" film that thoughtfully examines the navigation of tragedy's aftermath and presents the father's struggle with survivor's guilt through the ensemble's excellent performances, though he noted it focuses more on sensational aspects of the crime that may not resonate with all audiences. Wendy Ide at The Guardian gave the film 2/5 stars and offered a rather negative review, criticising its missed opportunity for psychological exploration despite a "promising opening", which is undermined by "flabby backstory" and "unwieldy flashbacks" that reduce the remainder of the film to a mere "ghoulish countdown to the attack itself".

=== Audience response ===
The film received mixed reviews from the audience, with Sing Tao Daily reporting criticism on the internet regarding whether it inflicted secondary victimisation on the surviving father from the Heung Wo Street Murder. Philip Yung later responded on Facebook, explaining that he had received full consent from Kan Fuk-kui to adapt his story and that Kan expressed his support for the film. (Note: Kan Fuk-kui was given a "Special Thanks" credit in the film.) William Lau of the Hong Kong Film Critics Society summarised other common criticisms online, particularly regarding the film's narrative subtlety, questioning the abnormal emotional state and illogical motives of Sean Lau's character, which prioritise an omniscient point of view over the father's perspective in interpreting the tragedy.

== Awards and nominations ==
Papa received a total of 11 nominations in the 43rd Hong Kong Film Awards, making it the third most-nominated film of the year.

Year	Award	Category	Nominee	Result	Ref.
2024	37th Tokyo International Film Festival	Tokyo Sakura Grand Prix	—N/a	Nominated	
2025	31st Hong Kong Film Critics Society Awards	Best Director	Philip Yung	Won	
2025	31st Hong Kong Film Critics Society Awards	Best Actor	Sean Lau	Won	
2025	31st Hong Kong Film Critics Society Awards	Best Actress	Jo Koo	Nominated	
2025	31st Hong Kong Film Critics Society Awards	Film of Merit	—N/a	Won	
2025	20th Hong Kong Film Directors' Guild Awards	Best Supporting Actress	Jo Koo	Won	
2025	20th Hong Kong Film Directors' Guild Awards	Best New Performer	Dylan So	Won	
2025	18th Asian Film Awards	Best Actor	Sean Lau	Won	
2025	18th Asian Film Awards	Best Newcomer	Dylan So	Nominated	
2025	18th Asian Film Awards	Best Editing	Jojo Shek	Nominated	
2025	43rd Hong Kong Film Awards	Best Film	—N/a	Nominated	
2025	43rd Hong Kong Film Awards	Best Director	Philip Yung, Au Cheuk-man	Nominated	
2025	43rd Hong Kong Film Awards	Best Screenplay	Philip Yung	Nominated	
2025	43rd Hong Kong Film Awards	Best Actor	Sean Lau	Won	
2025	43rd Hong Kong Film Awards	Best Supporting Actress	Jo Koo	Won	
2025	43rd Hong Kong Film Awards	Best New Performer	Dylan So	Won	
2025	43rd Hong Kong Film Awards	Best Cinematography	Chin Ting-chang, Leung Yau-cheong	Nominated	
2025	43rd Hong Kong Film Awards	Best Editing	Jojo Shek	Nominated	
2025	43rd Hong Kong Film Awards	Best Art Direction	Ida Mak	Nominated	
2025	43rd Hong Kong Film Awards	Best Costume Make Up Design	Dora Ng, Kayden Chan	Nominated	
2025	43rd Hong Kong Film Awards	Best Original Film Score	Ding Ke	Nominated	
2025	27th Far East Film Festival	Golden Mulberry	—N/a	Nominated	
2025	18th Asia Pacific Screen Awards	Best Performance	Sean Lau	Won	
