= Last Letter =

Last Letter may refer to:

- Last Letter (2018 film)
- Last Letter (2020 film)
- Last Letter, a 2023 song by Kayan9896
- The Last Letter, song by Rex Griffin
