= Ke (surname) =

- Pronunciation: [kʰɤ́]
- Language: Chinese

Origin
- Language: Old Chinese
- Region of origin: China, and among the overseas Chinese

Other names
- Variant forms: Quah, Qua, Kua, Kuah, Kwa, Ker, Ko, Koa, Kok, O, Or, Orr (Chinese); Kha (Vietnamese)

Ke (Chinese: 柯; pinyin: Kē; Jyutping: O1) is a Chinese surname. It originally appeared in the Hundred Family Surnames. As of 2006 it was no longer one of the 100 most common surnames in China. A 2013 study found that it was the 145th most common surname, shared by 1.06 million people or 0.080% of the population, with the greatest concentration in Hubei.

The surname has many English spellings, which fall into two groups reflecting different pronunciations. Those beginning with a k sound — Ke, Ker, Ko, Koa, Kok, Kua, Kuah, Kwa, Qua, and Quah — come from Mandarin and other dialects; Ke is the Pinyin spelling and Ko the Wade–Giles spelling of the same reading. Those beginning with a vowel — O, Or, and Orr — are Hong Kong spellings derived from the Cantonese pronunciation (O in Jyutping).

== Origin ==
There are several origins of this surname:

1. The descendants of Duke Ke Lu (柯盧) of the State of Wu during the Spring and Autumn period;
2. The descendants of a tribe in the Northern Wei dynasty whose surname was originally Keba (柯拔) but was simplified to Ke;
3. The descendants of the Qiang tribe or the Xianbei tribe with the surname Ke.

One source lists it as originating from the town of Han in Zhejiang Province, while another states it originated in Jiyang Prefecture (located in present-day Dingtao County, Shandong Province) during the Jin dynasty (266–420).

== Notable people ==
- Cua Yi Lam, baptized as Domingo Lamco, patrilineal ancestor of José Rizal, Philippine national hero
- Ke Mengde, a Song dynasty poet
- Ke Jiusi (柯九思), a Yuan dynasty officer
- Ke Qian, a Ming dynasty scholar
- Ke Weizhen, a Qing dynasty poet
- Blackie Ko Shou Liang (柯受良), director, actor, and stuntman
- Alan Ke You Lun (柯有綸), a Taiwanese singer and actor; son of Blackie Ko Shou Liang
- Ker Chien-ming (柯建銘), Taiwanese politician
- Danny Quah, professor of economics at the London School of Economics
- Kwa Geok Choo, wife of Singapore's first prime minister, Lee Kuan Yew
- Ko Chen-tung (柯震東), a Taiwanese actor and singer
- Ko Chia-yen (柯佳嬿), a Taiwanese actress
- Ko Wen-je (柯文哲), former Mayor of Taipei and chairman of the Taiwan People's Party
- Ke Jie (柯洁), a Chinese world Go champion
- Quah Chow Cheung (柯昭璋), a Hong Kong Scout commissioner
- Simon Ko, deputy foreign minister of the Republic of China
- Quah Kim Lye, a Singaporean footballer
- Quah Kim Song (柯金松), a Singaporean footballer
- Quah Ting Wen (柯婷文), a Singaporean swimmer
- Quah Zheng Wen (柯政文), a Singaporean swimmer
- Quah Jing Wen (柯敬文), a Singaporean swimmer
- Ke Qingshi (柯庆施), senior Chinese politician
- Quah Nian King (柯年庆), entrepreneur in Malaysia and Singapore
- Myth Or (柯翠婷), a Hong Kong singer and comedian

=== Kha (Vietnamese variant) ===
Kha is a Vietnamese variant of the surname Ke (柯).

- Kha Mỹ Vân, a Vietnamese model

== See also ==
- Hundred Family Surnames
- Chinese name
