= Over My Dead Body (2023 film) =

2023 Hong Kong film by Ho Cheuk-tin

- Theatrical poster
- Traditional Chinese: 死屍死時四十四
- Literal meaning: The Dead Body Died at the Age of Forty-four
- Jyutping: Sei^{2} Si^{1} Sei^{2} Si^{4} Sei^{3} Sap^{6} Sei^{2}
- Directed by: Ho Cheuk Tin
- Screenplay by: Amy Chin; Kong Ho Yan
- Produced by: Amy Chin; Josie Ho
- Starring: Teresa Mo; Ronald Cheng; Wong You-nam; Jennifer Yu; Edan Lui; Yeung Wai-lun; Lau Kong; Bonnie Wong
- Cinematography: Joseph Leung
- Edited by: David Wu
- Music by: Tsui Chin Hung
- Production companies: One Cool Film Production; 852 Films; Icon Group
- Distributed by: Intercontinental Film
- Release dates: 15 March 2023 (OAFF); 4 April 2023 (Hong Kong)
- Running time: 119 minutes
- Country: Hong Kong
- Language: Cantonese
- Budget: HK$18.8 million

Over My Dead Body (Chinese: 死屍死時四十四) is a 2023 Hong Kong black comedy film directed by Ho Cheuk Tin and co-written by Amy Chin and Kong Ho Yan. Starring Teresa Mo, Ronald Cheng, Wong You-nam, Jennifer Yu, Edan Lui, Yeung Wai-lun, Lau Kong, and Bonnie Wong, the film revolves around a group of apartment residents trying to dispose of a mysterious corpse that has appeared on their floor to prevent their homes from becoming stigmatized properties and losing value.

The screenplay began development in March 2019 and was greenlit in October 2021, with Ho Cheuk Tin joining the project that same year, marking his second feature film after The Sparring Partner (2022). Filming commenced in May 2022 and wrapped in June, primarily taking place in Tai Wai, Sha Tin District.

The film had its world premiere as the closing film of the 18th Osaka Film Festival on 15 March 2023, followed by a theatrical release in Hong Kong on 4 April. It received two nominations in the 42nd Hong Kong Film Awards, with Jiro Lee nominated for Best Supporting Actor.

== Plot ==
Ming returns to his mother-in-law Meghan's apartment 14A in high-end private estate Seaside Heights after work, where he lives with his wife Yana and brother-in-law Kingston. Later that night, after Ming takes out the garbage, he discovers a male body lying at the door of their apartment. Nervously, he alerts everyone inside.

Without thoroughly checking whether the man is dead, Ming suggests calling the police, but Meghan immediately rejects this option, fearing their apartment will become stigmatized property, significantly losing value and complicating their already debt-ridden lives. She proposes moving the corpse to their neighboring apartment 14B, and the four residents of 14A push the body next door with mops to avoid leaving any traces. However, they accidentally make noise, alerting the 14B residents, an elderly couple named Boron and Betty. Boron sees the 14A residents moving the corpse through the peephole and immediately opens the door to confront them. Concerned that their apartment's devaluation will affect their planned migration and retirement savings, the old couple bursts into an argument with them. Soon, they all agree to move the corpse to 14C, where Mary, a taciturn woman rumored to be associated with sorcery, lives and might know how to handle the situation. When they move the corpse to her door, it breaks open, and a pet dog runs out, revealing that her strange behavior is due to her secretly keeping a pet. Meghan immediately accuses the dog of having bitten the man to death, but Mary denies it, claiming that the dog is a Buddhist, and such an accusation of it taking a life could prevent it from reincarnating.

A man steps out of the elevator, introducing himself as Bear, who lives in 14D. Everyone then falsely claims they have seen a corpse lying outside of his apartment, insisting it belongs to him. Arguments ensue, with threats to call the police, but none actually take action. Then, a man walks out of 14D, alerted by the loud commotion, and introduces himself as Bear's son Messi. To ease the hostility, Meghan brings up the public housing estate next to Seaside Heights known for suicides. Everyone, except Messi, agrees to move the corpse there since it is a public estate and will not affect property prices. As Ming, Kingston, Boron, and Bear move the corpse downstairs, they encounter their apartment's security guard Lee. They try but fail to fool him, and after he discovers the body, they subdue him and lock him up in 14D under the reluctant supervision of Messi. Realizing that all exits of the building have CCTV, they decide to drop the corpse down the garbage chute and retrieve it from the refuse chamber. However, a group of workers cleans the pipe, forcing them to retrieve the body and find an alternative plan. Their actions catch the attention of a girl smoking nearby, who introduces herself as Sue, a resident of 13A. She is getting married the next day and doesn't want any bad luck in the building, so she offers her help.

Lee manages to escape while luring Messi to drink beer and gets drunk. He pursues the residents of the 14th floor, who are moving the corpse to the rooftop, using a suspended working platform to transport it out of the building on Sue's advice. Boron kicks Lee down the stairs, but he then suffers a heart attack and dies. The platform jams when it reaches the 14th floor, and everyone starts making excuses to stall the corpse from entering their home.

With no other options, they seek Sue's help again. She offers to smuggle the corpse under her bridal gown during her tea ceremony the next day. Although the residents of the 14th floor manage to sneak past Sue's relatives and friends, they are blocked again by Lee on the road. Messi hands Lee a red envelope, and he happily moves out of the way. They bury the corpse on a nearby hill. However, the corpse is actually still alive and has only been stung by a bee. Hearing his moans as he recovers, the residents begin to dig him out of the grave.

== Cast ==
- Teresa Mo as Meghan So, a materialistic matriarch and resident of 14A
- Ronald Cheng as Bear Cheung, a grumpy taxi driver and resident of 14D
- Wong You-nam as Ming To, the underemployed husband of Yana who resides in his mother-in-law's 14A
- Jennifer Yu as Yana Chung, Ming's wife and resident of 14A
- Edan Lui as Messi Cheung, a football coach and the son of Bear who resides in 14D
- Yeung Wai-lun as Kingston Chung, the autistic son of Meghan and Yana's brother who resides in 14A
- Lau Kong as Boron Chan, a retired teacher and resident of 14B
- Bonnie Wong as Betty Chan, Boron's wife and a resident of 14B

Also appearing in the film are Hanna Chan as Sue Yu, a soon-to-be-married resident of 13A who offered help to the 14th floor residents; Hang Sang Poon as Sue's father; Jiro Lee as S.G. Lee, a "believably priggish" security guard of Seaside Heights; Grace Wu as Mary Tse, a resident of 14C who lives alone with her pet dog; and Kenneth Cheung as Mr. Si, the new resident of 15A who was presumed dead throughout the film. Cameo appearances include Jer Lau as Sue's fiancé; Sunny Chan as a pundit; Mak Pui-tung as a security guard; and members of YouTube channel Pomato as Sue's bridesmaids and groomsmen. Louisa So and Jan Lamb, who previously starred in Ho Cheuk Tin's The Sparring Partner (2022), provide voice-overs as the narrator and for the advertisement of Seaside Heights respectively. Fruit Chan was slated to cameo as a garage owner, but his scenes were cut from the final version.

== Production ==
=== Development ===
Writer Kong Ho Yan was approached by producer Amy Chin, with whom he had previously collaborated on The Midnight After (2014) and Ciao UFO (2019), to produce a comedy film. Kong presented several ideas, including one centered on the Hong Kong property market that follows a group of residents driven to madness by inflated property prices. The duo developed the screenplay from March 2019 and completed it by the end of that year. Chin then began searching for suitable directors and was advised by filmmaker Philip Yung and actor Yeung Wai-lun to consider Ho Cheuk Tin, who had worked with them on the then-unreleased The Sparring Partner (2022). Ho accepted the invitation in 2021, despite The Sparring Partner being a dark thriller that contrasts with the comedic tone of Over My Dead Body, marking his second feature film. He also cited The Seventh Seal (1957) and Shanghai, Shanghai (1990) as significant influences on the film. The main cast was handpicked by Chin, and potential cameos began to be arranged once the cast was finalized. In October 2021, the film was greenlit and received funding from the Film Development Fund of the Hong Kong Film Development Council, with Yeung Wai-lun and boy group Mirror member Ian Chan reported to be part of the main cast. Chan later denied being cast on Telegram. The film has a total production budget of HK$18.8 million, with the Development Fund consisting of HK$7.6 million. In April 2022, Teresa Mo, Ronald Cheng, and another Mirror member Edan Lui were announced as the main cast. Mo, who resided in Canada, returned to Hong Kong for filming earlier in January. In May, it was announced that the film would be jointly produced by One Cool Film Production, 852 Films, and Icon Group, with Josie Ho attached as a producer, and Jer Lau, Wong You-nam, Jennifer Yu, Hanna Chan, Lau Kong, and Bonnie Wong revealed to star. A teaser poster and release date were announced in January 2023, while the official trailer was released in March.

=== Filming ===
Principal photography began on 21 May 2022, with the first day of filming focused on a wedding scene. Approximately two-thirds of the film was shot in a studio, while most of the location shooting took place in Tai Wai, Sha Tin District. Director Ho Cheuk Tin chose to set the film in Tai Wai, as it is a new town and logical to have a new housing estate as the setting, with the town only bisected by the canals of Shing Mun River instead of being situated near the sea, which was designed as an irony to the name of the housing estate "Seaside Heights" in the film. Filming wrapped up on 15 June.

=== Music ===
The film's theme song "Salted Fish Game" was composed by Tsui Chin Hung, with lyrics by Wyman Wong and performed by Jer Lau. Director Ho Cheuk Tin deemed Lau's role, which was a cameo appearance in the film, too minor, so he also invited him to perform the theme song.

== Release ==
Over My Dead Body had its world premiere as the closing film of the 18th Osaka Film Festival on 15 March 2023, followed by a theatrical release on 4 April in Hong Kong. The film was also presented at the 25th Taipei Film Festival on 6 July.

== Reception ==
=== Box office ===
Over My Dead Body grossed over HK$5.83 million during Easter, and reached 10 million in its opening weekend. The film received HK$17 million in its second week, and accumulated over HK$20 million by its third week on 28 April, making it the second highest-grossing Hong Kong film of 2023 at that time. As of mid-May, the film's box office total stood at over HK$30 million.

=== Critical response ===
Edmund Lee of South China Morning Post gave Over My Dead Body 3.5/5 stars, praising director Ho Cheuk Tin's raw talent and confidence in crafting a conceptually adventurous and aesthetically considered comedy-drama out of an unlikely but clever premise revolving around a political pun and the absurdities of Hong Kong's inflated property market. Lee also ranked the film eighth out of the 37 Hong Kong films theatrically released in 2023. Keith Ho, writing for HK01, praised the film as a surprising black comedy filled with incisive absurdity, acknowledging the relevant themes, sharp dialogue, and the excellent direction and performances, which perfectly reflect the beauty and tragedy that Hong Kong people face in dealing with the absurdities of the real estate market. Jonathan Hung, in his review for am730, praised the film as a hilarious yet poignant black comedy that showcases the young director's bold and insightful approach to tackling the absurdities of Hong Kong society, with Hung noting the standout performances, particularly from actors Jiro Lee and Kenneth Cheung in minor roles, as well as the exceptionally written script and applaudable humour.

Leaf Arbuthnot of The Guardian gave the film 2/5 stars and offered a rather negative review, criticizing the film's frustrating attempt at delivering goofy comedy, which falls short with jokes that are unfunny, characters that are overly stereotypical, and an overall inane feeling, despite its promising premise about the madness of the Hong Kong property market. Kwok Ching-yin of Esquire focused on the auteur approach of the filmmaker, noting the similarity between this film and Ho Cheuk Tin's previous entry The Sparring Partner in their exploration of generational and political conflict in Hong Kong through metaphors, introspection scenes, and word puns, but whereas The Sparring Partner had a tragic ending, Over My Dead Body offered a more optimistic resolution where the generations reconciled.

== Awards and nominations ==
Year	Award	Category	Nominee	Result	Ref.
2024	42nd Hong Kong Film Awards	Best Supporting Actor	Jiro Lee	Nominated	
2024	42nd Hong Kong Film Awards	Best Costume Make Up Design	Stephanie Wong	Nominated	
