= Yeung Wai-lun =

Hong Kong actor (born 1982)

- Yeung in November 2022
- Born: Yeung Wai-lun; 1982 (age 43–44); Hong Kong
- Education: Hong Kong Academy for Performing Arts (BFA)
- Occupation: Actor
- Years active: 2014–present

Alan Yeung Wai-lun (Chinese: 楊偉倫, born 1982) is a Hong Kong actor best known for portraying Pierre in ViuTV drama series Ossan's Love (2021) and his role based on real-life murderer Henry Chau in the legal thriller film The Sparring Partner (2022). He was nominated for Best Actor in the 41st Hong Kong Film Awards with the latter role.

== Biography ==
Yeung was born in 1982. He became interested in acting after watching Liu Wai-hung's performances on television when he was in secondary school. He went to Caritas Institute of Community Education to study acting for a year, before attending Hong Kong Academy for Performing Arts (APA) to pursue a Bachelor of Fine Arts in performing arts. After graduating in 2007, he joined the Chung Ying Theatre Company and performed in numerous stage plays. He had won a Hong Kong Drama Award and a Hong Kong Theatre Libre for his performances. He also formed a band called Juicyning, with his APA classmates Michael Ning, Chu Pak Hong and Chu Pak Him.

In 2014, Yeung was invited by his APA classmate Wong Cho-lam to have a cameo in TVB drama series Come On, Cousin. He enjoyed the experience and began to look for on-screen opportunities. Yeung landed his first major television role in the 2017 miniseries Midnight Cousin along with his bandmates. He had his first solo major acting role in 2021 ViuTV drama series Ossan's Love, starring alongside Kenny Wong, Edan Lui and Anson Lo. Yeung also appeared in several feature films, including 2021 biographical film Zero to Hero, and 2022 drama series I SWIM.

Yeung received his breakthrough role in 2022, portraying a psychopathic murderer loosely based on real-life person Henry Chau in Ho Cheuk Tin's legal thriller The Sparring Partner. Yeung's performance received widespread acclaim from both the critics and the audience, and he was nominated for Best Actor in the 41st Hong Kong Film Awards. In 2023, Yeung also appeared in Ho Cheuk Tin's black comedy film Over My Dead Body in a lead role.

== Filmography ==
=== Film ===
| Year | Title | Role | Notes/Ref. |
|---|---|---|---|
| 2017 | Zombiology: Enjoy Yourself Tonight | Egg (阿蛋) | |
| 2019 | I Love You, You're Perfect, Now Change! | Cheung Chun (張春) | |
| 2019 | Ciao UFO | Applicant | |
| 2021 | Zero to Hero | Silly Keung (傻強) | |
| 2022 | Tales from the Occult | Joe | |
| 2022 | The Sparring Partner | Henry Cheung (張顯宗) | |
| 2023 | Over My Dead Body | Kingston Chung (鍾定堅) | |
| 2024 | The Lyricist Wannabe | Wong (黃大爺) | |
| 2024 | Crisis Negotiators | Lo Dik (魯迪) | |
| 2024 | Papa | Salty (鹹球) | |
| 2025 | My Best Bet | Golden Tooth (金牙佬) | |
| 2025 | Smashing Frank | Father Tang (鄧神父) | |
| 2026 | Night King | Turf (土地) | |

=== Television ===
| Year | Title | Role | Notes/Ref. |
|---|---|---|---|
| 2014 | Come On, Cousin | Billy | Cameo |
| 2017 | Midnight Cousin | Tam Tun (譚盾) | Main role |
| 2020 | The Gutter (TV series) | Chu Wai Keung (朱偉強) | Recurring role |
| 2021 | Ossan's Love | Pierre Fong (方梓平) | Main role |
| 2022 | I SWIM | Mr. Chiu (焦sir) | Main role |
| 2023 | Killing Procedures | Uncle | Main role |
| 2023 | Beyond the Common Ground | Chan Ying Kit (陳應傑) | Guest role |

== Awards and nominations ==
| Year | Award | Category | Work | Result | Ref. |
|---|---|---|---|---|---|
| 2014 | 23rd Hong Kong Drama Awards | Best Supporting Actor | The Big Big Day | Nominated | |
| 2015 | 24th Hong Kong Drama Awards | Best Supporting Actor | Go Go Ghost | Won | |
| 2015 | 7th Hong Kong Theatre Libre | Best Lead Actor | Freedom of Expression | Won | |
| 2022 | AEG 2022 | Best Actor (Film) | The Sparring Partner | Won | |
| 2023 | 41st Hong Kong Film Awards | Best Actor | The Sparring Partner | Nominated | |
