= Paws Land =

2024 Hong Kong documentary by Au Cheuk-man

- Theatrical release poster
- Traditional Chinese: 毛家
- Jyutping: Mou^{4} Gaa^{1}
- Directed by: Au Cheuk-man
- Produced by: Wong Suet-lee
- Cinematography: Wallace Jim
- Edited by: Au Cheuk-man; Wallace Jim
- Music by: Sebastian Poon
- Production companies: 60mass Hundred Doc
- Distributed by: Golden Scene
- Release dates: 27 October 2024 (HKAFF); 10 July 2025 (Hong Kong)
- Running time: 107 minutes
- Country: Hong Kong
- Language: Cantonese

Paws Land (Chinese: 毛家) is a 2024 Hong Kong documentary directed by Au Cheuk-man. The film is 107 minutes in length, and premiered on 27 October 2024 at the Hong Kong Asian Film Festival. It documents the rescue efforts of the local non-profit animal protection organization Paws Guardian Rescue Shelter from 2019 to 2023, revealing the harsh realities faced by stray animals in Hong Kong. The film is set to release theatrically on 10 July 2025 in Hong Kong.

== Synopsis ==
For humans, home is a warm refuge; for stray animals, however, it is a distant and often unreachable dream. Paws Land follows a four-year journey, documenting the lives of over 40 stray dogs who were abandoned or abused, and their paths to receiving medical treatment, temporary shelter, and ultimately adoption. The film shows that due to issues such as physical appearance or health conditions, many animals failed to find permanent homes—only four of the featured dogs were successfully adopted. This highlights the immense challenges and helplessness faced in the field of animal protection, especially in the face of limited resources and weak public awareness.

Structured in a segmented format, the documentary presents individual stories behind each rescue. It portrays the adjustment process between adopted animals and their new families, while also confronting the harsh realities—such as failed treatments and animals growing old and dying in shelters without ever being adopted. Through a candid lens, the film captures the emotional and moral struggles of rescuers, helping audiences better understand the difficulty and heartache involved in animal welfare work.

== Production ==
Director Au Cheuk-man is known for his narrative film Stand Up Story, and previously explored animal-related themes in his 2018 work Paws Men. Paws Land marks his first full documentary on animal protection, focusing on the front-line efforts of rescue. Using an immersive filming approach, he follows Paws Guardian Rescue Shelter members Kent and Jinny as they carry out animal rescues, provide medical care, and find homes for the animals. This includes emergency missions such as the operation at the Chi Kee Sawmill in Kwu Tung.
