= The Sparring Partner =

2022 Hong Kong film by Ho Cheuk-tin

- Theatrical release poster
- Traditional Chinese: 正義迴廊
- Jyutping: Zing^{3} Ji^{6} Wui^{4} Long^{4}
- Directed by: Ho Cheuk Tin
- Screenplay by: Frankie Tam; Oliver Yip; Thomas Leung
- Produced by: Philip Yung
- Starring: Yeung Wai-lun; Mak Pui-tung; Louisa So; Michael Chow; Jan Lamb
- Cinematography: Leung Yau Cheong
- Edited by: J.Him Lee; Zhang Zhao; Jojo Shek
- Music by: Sara Fung Chi Han
- Production companies: Mei Ah Entertainment; Word by Word; Film Development Fund
- Distributed by: Golden Scene; Mei Ah Entertainment
- Release dates: 27 October 2022 (Hong Kong, Macau); 9 December 2022 (US, Canada); 22 December 2022 (Australia, New Zealand); 30 December 2022 (Taiwan)
- Running time: 138 minutes
- Country: Hong Kong
- Languages: Cantonese; English(partial); German(partial)
- Budget: HK$10 million (US$1.29 million)
- Box office: HK$43 million (US$5.53 million) (Hong Kong); NT$590,000 (Taiwan)

The Sparring Partner is a 2022 Hong Kong legal crime thriller film directed by Ho Cheuk Tin in his directorial debut. The film stars Yeung Wai-lun, Mak Pui-tung, Louisa So, and Michael Chow, with Jan Lamb and Gloria Yip listed as special performers. The story is adapted from the 2013 Tai Kok Tsui double parricide and dismemberment case.

The film was premiered at The 46th Hong Kong International Film Festival. It was approved by the Film Development Fund with a financing amount of HK$2.5 million. and released by Golden Scene and Mei Ah Entertainment. The film was officially released in Hong Kong on 27 October 2022. It earned HK$43 million and becomes the tenth highest-grossing movie of 2022 in Hong Kong.

== Premise ==
The case of a double parricide becomes complicated and confusing. Two barristers represent the two defendants in court. Nine jurors with different backgrounds are involved in the debate of right and wrong in justice at the same time.

== Cast ==
- Yeung Wai-lun as Henry Cheung, the first defendant; a Hitler admirer with an IQ of 127
- Mak Pui-tung as Angus Tong, the second defendant of the case; an accountant with an IQ of 84
- Louisa So as Barrister Carrie Yau, a senior counsel and Angus' representative lawyer
- Michael Chow as Barrister Allen Chu, a solicitor in Prosecutions Division of the Department of Justice; He can perform excellent English but is bad at Cantonese
- Jan Lamb as Barrister Wilson Ng, Henry's representative lawyer
- Gloria Yip as Wai-Ping Yip, one of the jurors; a retired teacher and housewife
- Choi Tsz-Ching as Barrister Chan Yuk-Yu, a senior counsel in Prosecutions Division of the Department of Justice and Chu's assistant
- David Siu as Cheung Shiu, DCS sergeant
- Chu Pak-Him as Hin Jo Cheung, Henry's brother
- Harriet Yeung as Man Shan Tong, Angus' sister
- Xenia Chong as Pui King Shiu, Henry and Hin's cousin; a devout Christian
- Au Shiu Hee James as Kuen Kwai Cheung, Henry and Hin's father and the murder victim
- Fung-Kam Chan as Suet Yee Shiu, Henry and Hin's mother and the murder victim
- Brenda Chan Kwai-Fan as Yim-Or Suen, one of the jurors; a former principal
- Au Cheuk-man as Siu-Hung Mak, the jury foreman
- Ursula Wong Yue-Si as Mei Fan Liu, one of the jurors
- Chung Suet Ying as Ka-Man Cheng, one of the jurors
- Yau Man-Shing as Kin-Shing Lee, one of the jurors; a merchant
- Lam Sen as Si-Kwan Ko, one of the jurors; a Philosophy graduate
- Wong Wa-Wo as Fu Ho, one of the jurors who is retired
- Kiki Cheung Hoi Kei as Ka-Yan Koo, one of the jurors; an office lady
- Nicky Wong as Little O, a DCS officer
- Matt Chow as Superintendent Kam, the DCS superintendent
- Rachel Leung as Man Yee Ho, Ng's apprentice
- Joe Cheung as judge
- Larine Tang as Mika, Angus' ex-girlfriend
- Crystal Kwok as Amanda, a magazine editor
- Myth Or as Kate, a reporter who works for Amanda
- Patra Au as Little O's mother
- Sun Heyi as Concubine

== Production ==
Filming started on 25 December 2020. The new director Ho Cheuk Tin has been the assistant director of the film's producer Philip Yung for many years. The Sparring Partner is based on the 2013 Tai Kok Tsui double parricide and dismemberment case. The case involves parricide, dismemberment and hidden corpses, and shocked the Hong Kong society that time.

Philip Yung revealed that he knocked on doors everywhere to find investors for The Sparring Partner, but results in nothing, and he used his savings for buying property to invest the film. Afterwards, he thanked the owner of Mei Ah Entertainment, Guoxing Lee, for agreeing to invest part of the film's expenses, as well as the film fund, and two anonymous saviors. In the end, there was still HK$1 million short. "I boldly called Mr. K. He has always loved me in the wrong way. He only said two sentences on the phone, "Listen to the number of days", "Don't thank me, and don't mention it. I, try my best to make a good movie for Hong Kong'". Netizens have guessed who Mr. K is. Some hinted that it is Louis Koo, who also loves Hong Kong movies and is willing to help others realize their dreams, or Aaron Kwok, who won his first Best Actor Award with "Treading Blood and Looking for Plums", and sang "Killo Levi's Reply Letter" and "Call of Wrong Love". When interviewed by the media, Aaron Kwok responded that Mr. K is an investor in the film, but he is not an investor in the film himself, emphasizing that he supports the new director as an actor. People used different reasons to speculate whether it was Louis Koo or Aaron Kwok. Philip Yung responded by saying that he invested in the film, believing that it was Louis Koo himself, and Aaron Kwok himself denied it. Since the film involves parricides and subsequent dismemberment, it can definitely not pass the film censorship in China, so it can only rely on the Hong Kong local and overseas sales markets.

This is the first category III film of Mak Pui-tung, Louisa So, Jan Lamb, Choi Tsz-Ching, Chu Pak-Him, Ursula Wong Yue-Si, Chung Suet-Ying, Kiki Cheung Hoi Kei, Myth Or Yik-Ki, Rachel Leung, Nicky Wong and Patra Au. It also serves as Kicky Wong's debut film. In the meantime, this is Au Shiu Hee James' posthumous release.

Director Ho Cheuk Tin specially invited Wing Mo to act as an acting instructor at the filming scene in order to enable the actors to perform in a short period of time.

== Release ==
According to the movie rating system in Hong Kong, the film is listed as category III, only allowing aged 18 or above to watch.

The film had its world premiere as the opening film at the 46th Hong Kong International Film Festival on 30 August 2022. On September 1 the same year, Distributor Golden Scene announced that the film would be officially released in Hong Kong and Macau on 27 October, with the first screenings began in the same month.

The box office of the film on the opening day was only HK$200,000. Although it had a good reputation, the results were not as good as expected. After a week of release, it reversed its decline and became the single-day box office champion for four consecutive days starting from 3 November 2022. As of 6 November 2022, the cumulative daily box office is HK$8,642,637, approaching the 10 million dollar mark. The box office continued to rise and created a miracle in releasing. The box office in the first week was 3,229,784, the box office in the second week was 5,404,699, the box office in the third week was 7,532,260, the box office in the fourth week was 8,503,424, the box office in the fifth week was 6,163,268, and the box office in the sixth week was 3,704,698.}

Four weeks after its release (as of November 18), the box office of The Sparring Partner exceeded 20 million, becoming the 11th category III film in Hong Kong to reach HK$20 million.

As of November 27, the box office has exceeded HK$30 million. It is the fifth film in 2022 to break through HK$30 million after Chilli Laugh Story, Mama's Affair, Warriors of Future and Table for Six. It is also the eighth 30 million category III film in Hong Kong. In the sixth week, the box office defeated Black Panther 2: Wakanda Forever and regained the weekly box office championship.

As of January 21, the cumulative box office has reached HK$41.6 million, becoming the 29th most-grossing Chinese film in Hong Kong, breaking the box office record of HK$41.07 million in the 2011 movie 3D Sex and Zen: Extreme Ecstasy, and becomes the champion of Hong Kong's third-level film, and became the fourth Hong Kong film to break through HK$40 million box office in 2022, setting a film record in Hong Kong film history.

The Walt Disney Company has purchased the exclusive copyright of the film. It was streamed exclusively online on Disney+ at 9:30 p.m. on 25 March 2023, and premiered exclusively on Fox Networks Group's Star Chinese Movies.

== Songs ==
Type	Name	Composer	Lyricist	Music arranger	Song producer	Vocal Artist
Theme Song	Twisted Fate	Sara Fung Chi Han	Morgan Cheung	Sara Fung Chi Han; Kenny Wong	Randy Chow; Sara Fung Chi Han; Kenny Wong	Hung Kaho

== Reception ==
=== Critical response ===
On Rotten Tomatoes, The Sparring Partner has an approval rating of 100% based on reviews from 7 critics. Cath Clarke of The Guardian gave the film three stars out of five, and described the movie as "part stylish courtroom drama, relishing the intellectual sparring of the barristers". Simon Abrams of RogerEbert.com awarded the film three point five stars out of four, writing that ""The Sparring Partner" is more about the culpability and partiality of a jury of Hong Kong residents, some of whom have read about this case in the tabloids, despite being told they should not".

== Awards and nominations ==
Year	Ceremony	Category	Recipient	Results	Ref(s)
2022	46th Hong Kong International Film Festival	Best New Actor in a Chinese Film	Mak Pui-tung	Nominated	
2022	AEG Entertainment Most Popular 2022	Best Drama	The Sparring Partner	Won	
2022	AEG Entertainment Most Popular 2022	Best New Director (Film)	Ho Cheuk Tin	Won	
2022	AEG Entertainment Most Popular 2022	Best Actor (Film)	Yeung Wai-lun	Won	
2022	AEG Entertainment Most Popular 2022	Best New Actor (Film)	Mak Pui-tung	Won	
2023	29th Hong Kong Film Critics Society Award	Best Screenplay	Frankie Tam, Oliver Yip, Thomas Leung	Nominated	
2023	29th Hong Kong Film Critics Society Award	Best Actor	Mak Pui-tung	Nominated	
2023	29th Hong Kong Film Critics Society Award	Recommended Movie	The Sparring Partner	Won	
2023	2022 Hong Kong Screenwriters' Guild Award	Recommended Screenplay of the Year	The Sparring Partner	Won	
2023	2022 Hong Kong Screenwriters' Guild Award	Best Movie Character of the Year	Mak Pui-tung	Won	
2023	16th Asian Film Awards	Best Newcomer	Mak Pui-tung	Won	
2023	2022 Hong Kong Film Directors' Guild Awards	Best New Director	Ho Cheuk Tin	Won	
2023	The 1st Hong Kong Online Film Critics HIGHLIGHT Awards	Most HIGHLIGHT Director	Ho Cheuk Tin	Won	
2023	The 1st Hong Kong Online Film Critics HIGHLIGHT Awards	Most HIGHLIGHT New Director	Ho Cheuk Tin	Won	
2023	The 1st Hong Kong Online Film Critics HIGHLIGHT Awards	Most HIGHLIGHT Movie	The Sparring Partner	Won	
2023	The 1st Hong Kong Online Film Critics HIGHLIGHT Awards	Most HIGHLIGHT Screenplay	Frankie Tam, Oliver Yip, Thomas Leung	Won	
2023	The 1st Hong Kong Online Film Critics HIGHLIGHT Awards	Most HIGHLIGHT Actor	Mak Pui-tung	Won	
2023	The 1st Hong Kong Online Film Critics HIGHLIGHT Awards	Most HIGHLIGHT Supporting Actress	Harriet Yeung	Won	
2023	MOVIE6 People's Choice Movie Award	Best Supporting Actress	Harriet Yeung	Won	
2023	MOVIE6 People's Choice Movie Award	Best Picture	The Sparring Partner	Won	
2023	MOVIE6 People's Choice Movie Award	Best Film Poster	The Sparring Partner	Nominated	
2023	MOVIE6 People's Choice Movie Award	Best Director	Ho Cheuk Tin	Won	
2023	MOVIE6 People's Choice Movie Award	Best New Director	Ho Cheuk Tin	Won	
2023	MOVIE6 People's Choice Movie Award	Best Actor	Mak Pui-tung	Nominated	
2023	MOVIE6 People's Choice Movie Award	Best Actress	Louisa So	Nominated	
2023	MOVIE6 People's Choice Movie Award	Best Supporting Actor	Jan Lamb	Nominated	
2023	MOVIE6 People's Choice Movie Award	Best Original Song	"Twisted Fate", composer：Sara Fung Chi Han, Kenny Wong	Nominated	
2023	41st Hong Kong Film Awards	Best Film	The Sparring Partner	Nominated	
2023	41st Hong Kong Film Awards	Best Director	Ho Cheuk Tin	Nominated	
2023	41st Hong Kong Film Awards	Best New Director	Ho Cheuk Tin	Won	
2023	41st Hong Kong Film Awards	Best Screenplay	Frankie Tam, Oliver Yip, Thomas Leung	Nominated	
2023	41st Hong Kong Film Awards	Best Actor	Mak Pui-tung	Nominated	
2023	41st Hong Kong Film Awards	Best Actor	Yeung Wai-lun	Nominated	
2023	41st Hong Kong Film Awards	Best Actress	Louisa So	Nominated	
2023	41st Hong Kong Film Awards	Best Supporting Actor	Jan Lamb	Nominated	
2023	41st Hong Kong Film Awards	Best Supporting Actress	Harriet Yeung	Nominated	
2023	41st Hong Kong Film Awards	Best Cinematography	Leung Yau Cheong	Nominated	
2023	41st Hong Kong Film Awards	Best Film Editing	J.Him Lee, Zhang Zhao, Jojo Shek	Won	
2023	41st Hong Kong Film Awards	Best Art Direction	Ida Mak	Nominated	
2023	41st Hong Kong Film Awards	Best Visual Effects	Shigeharu Tomotoshi	Nominated	
2023	41st Hong Kong Film Awards	Best Sound Design	Tu Duu Chih, Chiang Yi Chen	Nominated	
2023	41st Hong Kong Film Awards	Best Original Film Score	Sara Fung Chi Han	Nominated	
2023	41st Hong Kong Film Awards	Best Original Film Song	"Twisted Fate", composer：Sara Fung Chi Han, Kenny Wong	Nominated	
