= My Best Bet =

2025 Hong Kong film by Andy Lo

- Theatrical release poster
- Traditional Chinese: 祥賭必贏
- Jyutping: Coeng^{4} Dou^{2} Bit^{1} Jing^{4}
- Directed by: Andy Lo
- Screenplay by: Andy Lo
- Produced by: Ng Kin-hung
- Starring: Charlene Choi; Louis Cheung; Stanley Yau; Kayan9896; Chu Pak Hong; Bowie Wu; Yeung Wai-lun; Renci Yeung
- Cinematography: Karl Tam
- Edited by: Lin Pak-cheung
- Music by: Ronald Ng
- Production companies: Local Production; Mei Ah Entertainment
- Distributed by: Intercontinental Film
- Release date: 28 January 2025 (Hong Kong)
- Running time: 105 minutes
- Country: Hong Kong
- Language: Cantonese

My Best Bet (Chinese: 祥賭必贏) is a 2025 Hong Kong comedy film directed and written by Andy Lo. Starring an ensemble cast of Charlene Choi, Louis Cheung, Stanley Yau, Kayan9896, Chu Pak Hong, Bowie Wu, Yeung Wai-lun, and Renci Yeung, the film focuses on a pathological gambler (Choi) who struggles to overcome her addictions after marrying a husband (Cheung) who despises gambling.

The film was conceived and developed in 2024, marking screenwriter-director Andy Lo's return to comedy writing. Principal photography took place from October to November of the same year. It was theatrically released in Hong Kong on 28 January 2025, as a Chinese New Year film of the Year of Snake.

== Plot ==
Ching, a pathological gambler, starts gambling to support herself and her brother after their mother's death but loses all her money in an underground casino. Desperate, she tries to pengci by jumping into traffic, only to be rescued by a passerby Jing. They fall in love and begin dating, but Ching soon learns that Jing detests gambling, and he even calls the police when he sees schoolkids betting while playing basketball. To protect their relationship, Ching hides her gambling addiction from Jing, even after they marry.

After their wedding, Ching struggles to control her gambling urges and sneaks away to gamble while taking Jing's grandfather out for exercise. Guilt-ridden, she calls a hotline and tries to quit by joining an anti-gambling therapy session. Meanwhile, Jing's younger sister Ying meets a Chinese-Korean playboy named Ian. Initially put off by him, she changes her mind upon discovering he is a millionaire. Ying begins dating Ian, and they visit an underground casino he runs, where they win a large sum by betting against an unlucky gambler. Ching, however, fails her final therapy test and relapses into gambling. That night, Jing's grandfather goes missing, prompting the family to search for him. During this, Ching mistakenly follows someone she thinks is her grandfather into a mahjong parlor. When she realizes her mistake and exits, she runs into Jing, who finds her story suspicious. He contacts the anti-gambling therapist, revealing that he has been posing as a hotline operator to guide Ching into therapy. The therapist informs Jing that Ching has failed the test and shows him videos of her returning to gambling. The next day, Jing confronts Ching, scolding her for her addiction and telling her to leave their home. Desperate, Ching goes to stay with her brother Ming, who locks her inside to help her quit.

Ying expresses disappointment in Jing's treatment of Ching, revealing that he was once a pathological gambler too and overcame his addiction with family support. Ying later discovers Ian cheating with her best friend, revealing that Ian is actually a classmate of her brother Jing, and they have been at odds since school. He only pursues a relationship with her to get revenge. He throws a large amount of casino chips at her and breaks up with her. Heartbroken, Ying goes to Ming's bar for drinks, where Ming confesses his feelings for her. Meanwhile, Jing visits Ching, encouraged by Ying to reconcile. He shares his own struggles, and they make up. However, they soon get a call from Ian, who announces he has kidnapped Ying and Ming after they returned to his casino and lost everything. Despite having quit gambling, Ching and Jing go to Ian's casino and accept his gamble for the hostages' release. Ching outplays Ian, and after their win, the police arrive and arrest him, as Jing had called them to report the situation. Finally, Ching, Jing, and their family come together for a new year meal, and Jing allows them to gamble a little for fun.

== Cast ==
- Charlene Choi as Ching, a pathological gambler
- Louis Cheung as Jing, Ching's eventual husband and a fourth-generation owner of a struggling preserved fruit business
- Stanley Yau as Ming, a bartender and Ching's younger brother
- Kayan9896 as Ying, a gold-digger and Jing's younger sister
- Chu Pak Hong as Ian Suen, a Chinese-Korean millionaire and chauvinist
- Bowie Wu as Yan, Jing and Ying's grandfather
- Yeung Wai-lun as Golden Tooth, an unlucky gambler
- Renci Yeung as Sunny, a staff member at Jing's family business who secretly loves him

Also appearing in the film are Kay Tse as Sister Cheung, the best gambler in the neighborhood; Lam Yiu-sing as Terry, Suen's right-hand man; Kaki Sham as Kei, a blind gambler; Alan Luk as Mr. Lam, the mentor for the anti-gambling therapy sessions; Maggie Shiu as a police inspector; and Paulyn Sun, Karen Tong, JJ Jia, and film director Ho Cheuk Tin as street market stall owners and customers. Cameo appearances include singer Kaho Hung as BM, a loan shark and acquaintance of Ching, and indie film director Ronnie Chiu as a fortune teller.

== Production ==
=== Development ===
After filming Once in a Blue Moon (2024), screenwriter-director Andy Lo, who began his career in comedy screenwriting as an apprentice to Vincent Kok, was approached by producer Ng Kin-hung for a Chinese New Year film project, and he accepted the offer because he wanted to return to comedy screenwriting. Lo described the development of the project as "rushed", with pre-production lasting less than two months. In mid-October 2024, the film was officially announced as in production, with Lo also serving as director and Louis Cheung and Charlene Choi in lead roles. Choi, a mahjong enthusiast, also acted as a mahjong coach on set for the rest of the cast. An appreciation banquet was held in December, and an official trailer was released later that month.

=== Filming ===
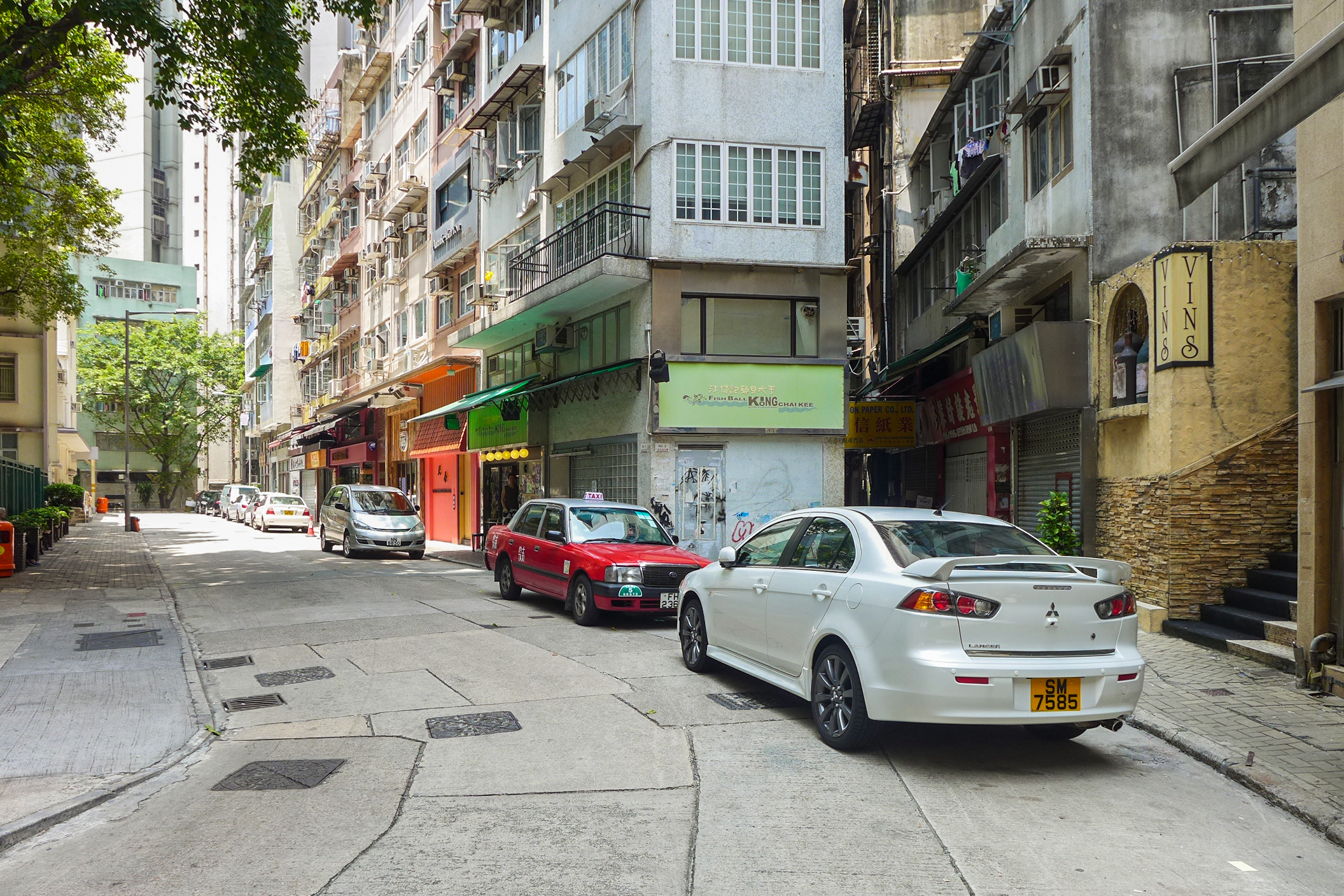
A scene filmed at Kau U Fong, Sheung Wan was deleted due to controversy over unauthorized shooting

Principal photography began on 21 October 2024. On 22 October, shooting took place at INUF, a skincare store at Kau U Fong, Sheung Wan, owned by designer Olive Wong, the wife of actor-singer Chui Tien-you, with Charlene Choi and Louis Cheung on set. On the same day, Wong posted on INUF's social media account, accusing the production crew of entering the store without consent and compared their actions to rape. On 23 October, the production crew of My Best Bet apologized on social media, clarifying that they had obtained authorization to film on the street and on the filming day, a crew member who claimed to be familiar with Wong asked a staff member of the store for permission, which led to the crew being allowed to film three scenes. The crew suggested this may have been due to a miscommunication with the staff. The scene was also deleted from the theatrical version. Charlene Choi expressed her shock at Wong's social media post, noting that she found the filming environment to be harmonious and that Chui Tien-you was present on set that day.

On 29 October, shooting took place at a street market in Shau Kei Wan, where Choi and JJ Jia were spotted on set. A worship ceremony was held on 12 November, with Kayan9896, Stanley Yau, Chu Pak Hong, and Yeung Wai-lun announced as part of the main cast. The film marks the first time for Kayan9896, Yau, and Chu to star in a new year film. Filming occurred in Tseung Kwan O on the same day. Production wrapped in late November.

== Release ==
My Best Bet had its premiere in Sha Tin on 18 January 2025, followed by a theatrical release in Hong Kong on 28 January as a Chinese New Year film of the Year of Snake.

== Reception ==
=== Box office ===
My Best Bet grossed over HK$1.3 million on its opening day, and concluded the Chinese New Year film period with HK$5.79 million, ranking second among the 2025 New Year Films. It accumulated HK$7.6 million in its first week of release.

=== Critical response ===
Edmund Lee of the South China Morning Post gave the film 3.5/5 stars, finding it "amusing but fairly unrefined in its first half", while praising Chu Pak Hong's portrayal of a "deceptively hackneyed villain" for adding unpredictability and life to the film, particularly through his fourth-wall-breaking scenes, and commending writer-director Alan Lo's "snappier, wittier, and more inventive" screenplay, which evolved into an effective comedy compared to his previous works in other genres. Keith Ho, writing for HK01, described the film as a "delightful and warm-hearted comedy" that combines humor with a simple yet engaging story featuring strong performances, particularly from Chu Pak Hong, while incorporating surprising fourth-wall-breaking elements that ultimately deliver a positive message about resilience and support in challenging times.

Siu Yu of am730 considered the film a refreshing and unexpectedly delightful Chinese New Year film that, despite its seemingly unremarkable production values, delivers frequent laughs, a heartfelt story, and strong performances, ultimately conveying a critical message about anti-gambling. Ho Tak of Harper's Bazaar also found the film to be "a surprising dark horse among the 2025 Chinese New Year films", complimenting its heartfelt exploration of family and anti-gambling themes and strong performances, especially from Chu Pak Hong who turns the film into a "genuinely entertaining comedy".
