= Prince of Tears (film) =

- Film poster
- Directed by: Yonfan
- Written by: Yonfan
- Produced by: Fruit Chan
- Starring: Fan Zhiwei; Océane Zhu; Joseph Chang; Terri Kwan; Li Po-husan; Tsai Pei-han; Kenneth Tsang
- Narrated by: Yonfan
- Cinematography: Chin Ting-chang
- Edited by: Derek Hui; Kwong Chi-leung
- Music by: Yu Yat-yiu
- Release date: 2009
- Country: Taiwan
- Language: Mandarin

Prince of Tears (Chinese: 淚王子; pinyin: Lei Wangzi) is a 2009 Taiwanese historical drama film by Yonfan. It was nominated for the Golden Lion at the 66th Venice International Film Festival. It tells the story of a family embroiled in the tragic "White Terror" suppression of political dissidents that was wrought during the 1950s by the Kuomintang government (KMT) after their acquisition of Taiwan in the 1940s.

The film was selected as the Hong Kong entry for the 82nd Academy Awards for Best Foreign Language Film in 2009.

== Cast ==
- Fan Zhiwei as Ding keqiang (丁克強)
- Océane Zhu as Jin Wanping (金皖平)
- Joseph Chang as Sun Hansheng (孫漢生)
- Terri Kwan as Ouyang Qianjun (歐陽千君)
- Kenneth Tsang as General Liu (劉將軍)
- Li Po-husan
- Tsai Pei-han
- Jack Kao
- Chiao Chiao
- Lin Yo-wei

== Reception ==
The film received generally negative reviews from the press.

Hong Kong film critic Perry Lam writes in Muse Magazine, "Prince of Tears makes a strange movie-going experience for, despite all the pathos - two little girls lose their father, a loyal soldier loses his life and a happy family is torn apart - the story is aesthetically shaped and distanced by the pictorial verve of the director to be eye-pleasing at all times."

== See also ==
- List of Hong Kong submissions for the Academy Award for Best Foreign Language Film
