= Chin Ting-chang =

Taiwanese cinematographer

- 秦鼎昌
- Born: Chin Ting-chang; Taiwan
- Education: Shih Hsin University (BA, MA)
- Occupation: Cinematographer
- Years active: 1998–present

Chin Ting-chang (Chinese: 秦鼎昌) is a Taiwanese cinematographer best known for his frequent collaborations with Wei Te-sheng. He gained recognition for his work on Cape No. 7 (2008), for which he won Best Cinematography in the 10th Taipei Film Awards and received a nomination for Best Cinematography in the 45th Golden Horse Awards. He later earned another nomination for Warriors of the Rainbow: Seediq Bale (2011) in the 48th Golden Horse Awards, as well as three Best Cinematography nominations for Prince of Tears (2009), Where the Wind Blows (2022), and Papa (2024) in the 29th, 41st, and 43rd Hong Kong Film Awards respectively.

== Career ==
Chin graduated from the Department of Radio and Television Studies at Shih Hsin University. During his sophomore year, he interned at a film production company alongside a senior, and he later returned to that company for a full-time position after graduation. He entered the film industry in 1994, starting as an Assistant Camera on Chen Kuo-fu's Peony Pavilion, working under cinematographer Christopher Doyle. He met Wei Te-sheng on the set of Edward Yang's Mahjong, where Wei was the assistant director. The two became acquainted due to their shared vision of filming localized stories despite commercial constraints, marking the beginning of their close collaboration. In 1999, Wei began writing his first screenplay, which later developed into Warriors of the Rainbow: Seediq Bale. Chin found the project immersive and of Hollywood quality, motivating him to improve his cinematography skills for such ambitious work. He made his cinematography debut with the 2000 documentary Grandma's Hairpin and received two Golden Bell Award for Best Cinematography for a Drama Series nominations for the television series Crystal Boys and Love's Lone Flower. Chin cited Mark Lee Ping-bing's cinematography as a major influence on his style, while Va Kio Daily described Chin's cinematography style as adept in natural lighting and expressive character capture.

In 2003, Wei self-funded NTD$2.5 million to film a five-minute trailer for Seediq Bale, with Chin directing the shoot. Chin's first feature film collaboration with Wei was as director of photography for Cape No. 7. The film broke the Taiwanese box office record with a gross of over NTD$500 million, and Chin won Best Cinematography in the 10th Taipei Film Awards and received a nomination for Best Cinematography in the 45th Golden Horse Awards. That same year, he also made his international debut with the South Korean action-comedy film My Mighty Princess, collaborating with Kwak Jae-yong, and earned a Master of Arts from Shih Hsin University. In 2009, Chin shot the Taiwanese-Hong Kong historical drama Prince of Tears and the romantic comedy Hear Me, earning a nomination for Best Cinematography in the 29th Hong Kong Film Awards with the former.

Chin and Wei collaborated again on Seediq Bale, which garnered Chin another nomination in the 48th Golden Horse Awards and a nomination for Best Cinematographer in the 6th Asia Pacific Screen Awards. Marc Savlov of The Austin Chronicle praised Chin's "dreamy" cinematography; while Don Groves of SBS Australia lauded his "widescreen photography" that gave the film "a grey, gloomy look". Chin continued to work on Night Market Hero, the Chinese film Joyful Reunion, and the Hokkien film Twa-Tiu-Tiann. In 2014, Chin worked on the sports film Kano, written and produced by Wei Te-sheng. Maggie Lee of Variety commended the film's grandeur, highlighting Chin's "sweeping widescreen visuals" that "captures the whirlwind movement and gut-busting exertion on the [baseball] field"; while James Marsh of ScreenAnarchy credited Chin's "sumptuous photography" for conveying the film's "grand spectacle". Chin reunited with the Kano production crew on the Malaysian film Ola Bola, and was selected to work on the fantasy film The M Riders Finding Pangu due to his work on Seediq Bale. In 2017, Chin collaborated with Wei again on his third feature 52Hz, I Love You, and later shot the Taiwanese films About Youth and Eclipse.

In 2022, Chin lensed Philip Yung's Hong Kong crime thriller Where the Wind Blows, with Philip Concannon of Sight and Sound praising his cinematography for "elegantly" enhancing the drama. He received a nomination in the 41st Hong Kong Film Awards for his work. Due to scheduling conflicts, he was absent from the filming of Wei Te-sheng's 2023 drama Big, but assisted in the post-production editing, particularly on color grading. In 2024, he collaborated with Philip Yung again on the feature film Papa. Leon Kuo of GQ praised his shots as "realistic and spiritually rich", which resemble a historical epic, and the film earned him another nomination in the 43rd Hong Kong Film Awards. Chin is also set to reunite with Wei on his upcoming project Taiwan Trilogy.

== Filmography ==
=== Film ===
Year	Title	Notes
1995	Peony Pavilion	Assistant Camera
1996	Mahjong	Assistant Camera
2000	Grandma's Hairpin	
2006	The Shoe Fairy	
2008	Cape No. 7	
2008	My Mighty Princess	
2009	Prince of Tears	
2009	Hear Me	
2011	Warriors of the Rainbow: Seediq Bale	
2011	Night Market Hero	
2012	Joyful Reunion	
2014	Twa-Tiu-Tiann	
2014	Kano	
2016	Ola Bola	
2016	The M Riders Finding Pangu	
2017	52Hz, I Love You	
2018	About Youth	
2020	Eclipse	
2022	Where the Wind Blows	
2024	Papa	

=== Television ===
Year	Title	Notes
2003	Crystal Boys	
2005	Love's Lone Flower	

== Awards and nominations ==
Year	Award	Category	Work	Result	Ref.
2003	38th Golden Bell Awards	Best Cinematography for a Drama Series	Crystal Boys	Nominated	
2005	40th Golden Bell Awards	Best Cinematography for a Drama Series	Love's Lone Flower	Nominated	
2008	10th Taipei Film Awards	Best Cinematography	Cape No. 7	Won	
2008	45th Golden Horse Awards	Best Cinematography	Cape No. 7	Nominated	
2010	29th Hong Kong Film Awards	Best Cinematography	Prince of Tears	Nominated	
2011	48th Golden Horse Awards	Best Cinematography	Warriors of the Rainbow: Seediq Bale	Nominated	
2012	6th Asia Pacific Screen Awards	Best Cinematographer	Warriors of the Rainbow: Seediq Bale	Nominated	
2023	41st Hong Kong Film Awards	Best Cinematography	Where the Wind Blows	Nominated	
2025	43rd Hong Kong Film Awards	Best Cinematography	Papa	Nominated	
