= 2010 Heung Wo Street Murder =

2010 Hong Kong murder case

On 22 July 2010, in Tsuen Wan, Hong Kong, a 15-year-old boy fatally stabbed his 42-year-old mother, Lam Lim-kam, and 12-year-old sister, Kan Chun-yuen, in their apartment on Heung Wo Street. Afterward, he wandered the streets and surrendered to the police. On 1 February 2012, he pleaded guilty at the High Court of Hong Kong to two counts of manslaughter. Psychiatric assessment found that he was suffering from schizophrenia at the time of the offences, and he was therefore given an indefinite hospital order.

== Background ==
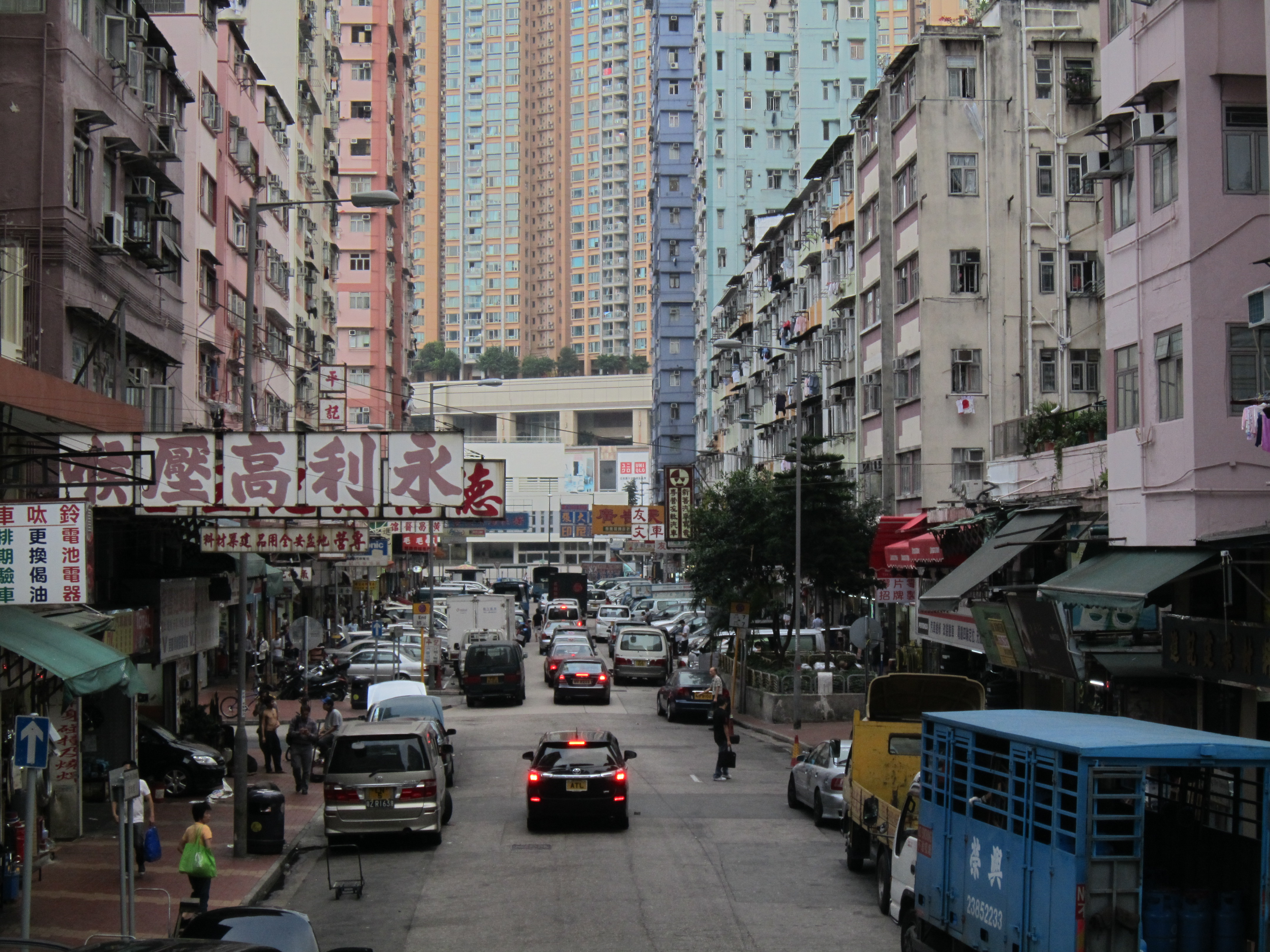
Heung Wo Street, 2012

The family of four lived in a flat at On Fung Building, Heung Wo Street, Tsuen Wan. Since 2004, the parents had operated the 24-hour cha chaan teng, called Fan Fan Ho Restaurant (飯飯好餐廳), across the street from their home. They had two children, Kan Ka-leung and Kan Chun-yuen, and the family relationship had generally been normal. Restaurant employee Ms. Jim said the siblings were well-behaved and often helped at the restaurant; she had never heard of family disputes, and their mother often made soup for them and clearly cared deeply for her children.

The 15-year-old boy, Kan Ka-leung, was known to the neighbors and teachers as a well-behaved and academically gifted boy, though introverted and quiet. He consistently ranked near the top of his class, placing first in his class in Primary Six and later serving as class monitor in secondary school. He enjoyed reading online novels and playing video and online games. His younger sister, Chun-yuen, was likewise academically accomplished and well-liked. Tsang Wai-yiu, the vice-principal of Po Leung Kuk Lee Shing Pik College in Tsuen Wan, which Kan Ka-leung attended, described Ka-leung as an average student, but well-behaved and disciplined. He was not a social-work case and had no record of seeking help from the school.

== Incident ==
On the morning of 22 July 2010, in an apartment on Heung Wo Street, Tsuen Wan, a 15-year-old boy attacked his 42-year-old mother and 12-year-old younger sister with a knife, resulting in their deaths. The boy reportedly admitted to the killings, though the motive remained unclear in initial reports.

== Legal proceedings ==
On 24 July, 6 August, and 17 September 2010, the case was brought before the Juvenile Court of the Tsuen Wan Magistrates' Courts. The defendant, Kan Ka-leung, was charged with two counts of murder. The charges alleged that on 22 July 2010, Kan murdered his 42-year-old mother, Lam Lim-kam, and his 12-year-old sister, Kan Chun-yuen, at their home in On Fung Building, Heung Wo Street. TMCC 700073/2010

On 1 February 2012, the case was heard at the High Court. Kan pleaded not guilty to two counts of murder but pleaded guilty to two counts of manslaughter. Following the hearings, Kan was remanded in custody at Siu Lam Psychiatric Centre. HCCC 186/2011

== Cultural impact ==
In 2024, the incident served as the basis for the film Papa, directed by Philip Yung and starring Sean Lau Ching-wan. The film focuses on the emotional aftermath of the murders, particularly the grief of the surviving father, and is described as a poignant exploration of loss and redemption. The film became the ninth highest-grossing Hong Kong film of 2024 and received generally positive reviews from critics, particularly for Sean Lau's performance. It garnered various accolades, including 11 nominations in the 43rd Hong Kong Film Awards, and Lau won a Hong Kong Film Award, a Hong Kong Film Critics Society Award and an Asian Film Award for his performance.
