= Mak Pui-tung =

Hong Kong actor (born 1988/1989)

- Mak in November 2022
- Born: Mak Pui-tung; 1988 or 1989 (age 36–37); Hong Kong
- Education: Hong Kong Academy for Performing Arts (BFA)
- Occupation: Actor
- Years active: 2020–present

Mak Pui-tung (Chinese: 麥沛東, born 1988/1989) is a Hong Kong actor best known for his role based on real-life murder suspect Angus Tse in the legal thriller film The Sparring Partner (2022), for which he won Best Newcomer in the 16th Asian Film Awards and was nominated for Best Actor in the 41st Hong Kong Film Awards.

== Biography ==
Mak was born in 1988 or 1989. He attended City University of Hong Kong to pursue an associate degree and joined the university's drama club. He became interested in acting after performing in several stage plays and transferred to Hong Kong Academy for Performing Arts in 2010 to acquire a BFA in performing arts. After graduating in 2014, Mak joined the Chung Ying Theatre Company and performed in numerous stage plays. He earned a nomination for Best Supporting Actor in the 25th Hong Kong Drama Awards.

In 2019, Mak left the Theatre Company and began to work as a freelance actor. He featured in the 2020 ViuTV drama series Warriors Within and the 2021 biographical film Zero to Hero. Mak received his breakthrough and first leading role in Ho Cheuk Tin's legal thriller The Sparring Partner in 2022, portraying a disabled and manipulated murder accomplice loosely based on real-life person Angus Tse. His performance received widespread acclaim from both the critics and the audience. One of his lines in the film, where he tells the jury and opposing counsels feel free to frame him, had also become a viral internet meme in Hong Kong. He won Best Newcomer in the 16th Asian Film Awards, and received nominations for Best Actor in the 41st Hong Kong Film Awards and Best Actor in the 29th Hong Kong Film Critics Society Award in the following year with the role. In 2023, Mak had a cameo appearance in Ho Cheuk Tin's black comedy film Over My Dead Body.

== Filmography ==
=== Film ===
Year	Title	Role	Notes/Ref.
2021	Zero to Hero	Chicken (阿雞)	
2022	The Sparring Partner	Angus Tong (唐文奇)	
2023	Over My Dead Body	Security guard	Cameo
2023	The Super Mario Bros. Movie	Luigi	Cantonese voice dub
2024	The Garfield Movie	Garfield	Cantonese voice dub

=== Television ===
Year	Title	Role	Notes/Ref.
2020	Warriors Within	Fat Lung (肥龍)	Guest role

== Awards and nominations ==
Year	Award	Category	Work	Result	Ref.
2016	25th Hong Kong Drama Awards	Best Supporting Actor	The Big Big Day	Nominated	
2022	30th Hong Kong Drama Awards	Best Supporting Actor	SHHHH	Nominated	
2022	46th Hong Kong International Film Festival	Young Cinema (Best Actor)	The Sparring Partner	Won	
2022	AEG 2022	Best Actor (Film)	The Sparring Partner	Won	
2023	29th Hong Kong Film Critics Society Award	Best Actor	The Sparring Partner	Nominated	
2023	16th Asian Film Awards	Best Newcomer	The Sparring Partner	Won	
2023	41st Hong Kong Film Awards	Best Actor	The Sparring Partner	Nominated	
