= Au Cheuk-man =

Au Cheuk-man (Chinese: 區焯文; born April 26, 1975), nicknamed A-men, is a Hong Kong-born film director, screenwriter, and actor. He is a former actor and television host at Hong Kong Cable Television.

== Background ==
=== Early life ===
Au Cheuk-man studied at St. Francis Xavier’s School in Tsuen Wan before enrolling in the School of Drama at the Hong Kong Academy for Performing Arts, where he completed a diploma program in acting. He also took part in the 3rd Directors' Training Program organized by the Hong Kong Film Directors' Guild. Au later pursued a directing course at the New York Film Academy in the United States and studied Fine Arts for a year at Blake College in London.

In 1999, he joined the artist management company Star East (東方魅力). Three years later, he was introduced by a friend to Cable TV's children’s channel, where he co-hosted educational programs IQ Atypical with Andrew Liu Shuk Wing. During the 2003 SARS outbreak, when most students stayed home and watched television, his children’s shows gained high viewership. He was later reassigned to host a program on the entertainment channel, but due to complaints about his frivolous on-screen behavior, his contract with Cable TV was terminated in 2009. On the same day he was dismissed, his wife suffered a miscarriage. Following that, a business venture he started in Tsuen Wan resulted in significant financial losses. This led to an imbalance between his workload and income, and he was unemployed for three years.

=== Film career ===
In 2015, Au made his directorial debut with the film The Gigolo. The film grossed over HKD 6 million in Hong Kong and Macau, bringing him back into the public spotlight.

Since then, Au's creative direction has increasingly focused on social issues. His 2018 film Paws Men, which he wrote, directed, and starred in, was produced on a low budget and focused on animal welfare. His 2023 work Stand Up Story explored father-son relationships and received positive reviews.

Beginning in 2024, Au released several socially conscious films. The Manor focused on the lives of people with disabilities, while the documentary Paws Land chronicled the everyday operations of the local animal rescue organization Paws Guardian Rescue Shelter.

He also served as co-director of the 2024 film Papa, which earned him the 43rd Hong Kong Film Award for Best Director. Although only Philip Yung was submitted as director with Au's agreement and acknowledgment of his supportive role, this led to controversy when Au was excluded from the Hong Kong Film Critics Society Awards. The Society later clarified they followed the production team's consensus. In contrast, the Hong Kong Film Awards nominated both Yung and Au, citing their policy of honoring official film credits.
