= Kayan9896 =

Hong Kong singer

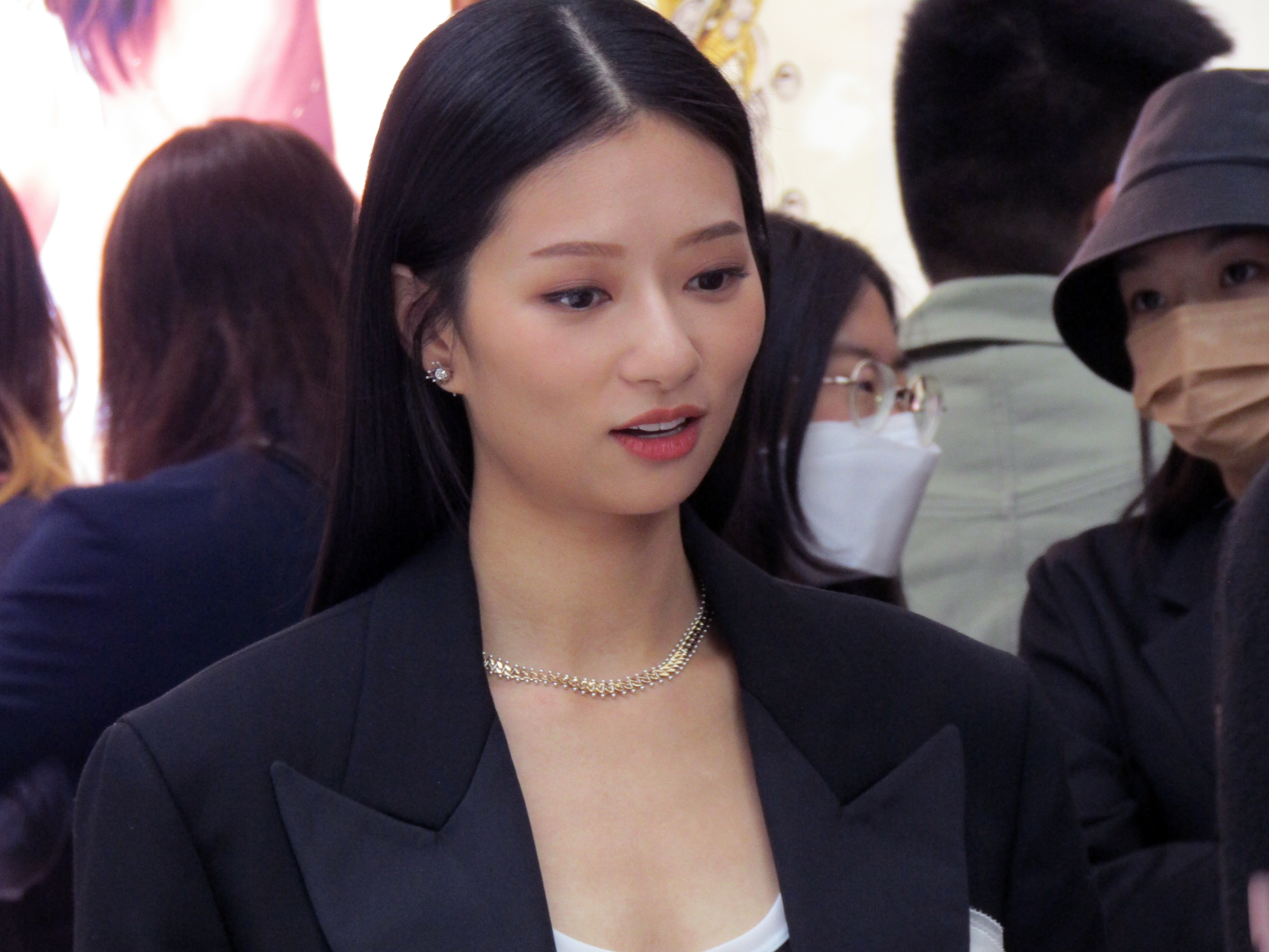
- Kayan9896 in a brand event

Background information
- Born: Ng Ka-yan (吳家忻); 6 September 1998 (age 28); Hong Kong
- Genres: Cantopop; Dance-pop; R&B
- Occupation: Singer
- Instruments: Vocals, piano
- Years active: 2020–present
- Label: New Age Tone Entertainment

Jeannie Ng Ka-yan (Chinese: 吳家忻; born 6 September 1998), better known by her stage name Kayan9896, is a Hong Kong singer. She is known for appearing on a video of the YouTube Channel Trial & Error, appearing on ViuTV's Drama You Only Live Once and featuring in MC $oHo & KidNey's song "係咁先啦 ". She released her first single "Be Around" on 9 December 2021.

== Discography ==
=== Singles ===
Cantonese

- "Be around" (2021)
- "Not Too Close" (2022)
- "Farewell at Night" (夜幕下告別) (2025)

English

- "Hell No" (2022)
- "Think I'm In Love" (2023)
- "Last Letter" (2023)
- "Midnight Serenade" (2023)
- "Lost in the Rain" (2025)

== Filmography ==
=== Film ===
Year	Title
2023	The Lyricist Wannabe
2025	My Best Bet
2026	Gamer Girls

=== Drama ===
Year	Title	Platform
2021	You Only Live Once	ViuTV
2022	lovesignal	Viu
2024	The Divination Gossip Club	Viu

=== Music video appearances ===
Year	Title
2020	Tyson Yoshi - "Something"
2021	Ian Chan - "DWBF"
2021	Gigi Leung Capítulo Music Short Film Part 1 & 2
2023	Mayao - "Many Times of First Love"

=== Music videos ===
Year	Title
2021	You Only Live Once's Theme Song - "Difficult to Choose" (選擇困難)

== Awards and nominations ==
Year	Award ceremony	Category	Result	Ref.
2022	Ultimate Song Chart Awards Presentation	Best Female Rookies	Bronze	
2022/23	Chill Club Chart Award Presentation	Best Female Rookies	Bronze	
