= Myth Or =

Hong Kong singer and comedian

Tsui Ting Or
- Born: 13 June 1993 (age 33); British Hong Kong
- Occupations: Singer; comedian
- Years active: 2015–present

Chinese name
- Traditional Chinese: 柯翠婷
Transcriptions
Yue: Cantonese
- Jyutping: o1 ceoi3 ting4
- Musical career
- Also known as: Keiko Myth Or
- Genres: Cantopop
- Instrument: Vocals

Myth Or
- Traditional Chinese: 柯翠婷
Transcriptions
Yue: Cantonese
- Jyutping: o1 ceoi3 ting4

Poon Choi Ying Chi
- Traditional Chinese: 盤菜瑩子
Transcriptions
Yue: Cantonese
- Jyutping: pun4 coi3 jing4 zi2

Tsui Ting Or (born 13 June 1993), known professionally as Myth Or, is a Hong Kong singer and comedian. She is the director and one of the hosts of the news satire programmes of TV Most, debuting with the stage name Poon Choi Ying Chi, and is the vocalist of the band Autumn Cicada. Beside her role in the satire programmes, she has been an opinion leader among the younger generation of Hong Kong people and has impact on the recent emergence of a Hong Kong identity. She is also known for her involvement in pro-democratic activism.
