= Murder of Glory Chau and Moon Siu =

2013 Hong Kong murder case

Moon Siu Yuet-yee, Glory Chau Wing-ki
- Glory Chau (left) and Moon Siu (right)
- Disappeared: Hoi Hing Building, Kok Cheung, Tai Kok Tsui, Hong Kong
- Died: presumably on 1 March 2013, Glory Chau (aged 65), Moon Siu Yuet-yee (aged 63)
- Cause of death: Murder
- Body discovered: Tai Kok Tsui, Hong Kong, 15 March 2013 at Angus Tse's flat in Kok Cheung
- Children: 2

Glory Chau Wing-ki (Note: traditional Chinese: 周榮基; simplified Chinese: 周荣基; Jyutping: zau1 wing4 gei1; pinyin: Zhōu Róngjī) (aged 65) and Moon Siu Yuet-yee (Note: 蕭月兒; 萧月儿; siu1 jyut6 ji4; Xiāo Yuèér) (aged 63) were a couple murdered in the Kok Cheung section of Tai Kok Tsui, Hong Kong, presumably on 1 March 2013. Their youngest son, Henry Chau Hoi-leung (Note: 周凱亮; 周凯亮; zau1 hoi2 loeng6; Zhōu Kǎiliàng) (29 at the time of the murder) and his friend Angus Tse Chun-kei (Note: 謝臻麒; 谢臻麒; ze6 zeon1 kei4; Xiè Zhēnqí) (35 at the time of the murder), were indicted for the murder, which they initially denied being involved in. During Chau and Tse's interviews with the police, they admitted that after the murder, they chopped up the parents' dead bodies and cooked the remains with salt to make them look "like barbecue pork". They kept part of the remains in lunch boxes, which they stored in the refrigerator. The gruesome details of the murder sparked a huge amount of media coverage in Hong Kong.

On 20 March 2015, High Court deputy judge Michael Stuart-Moore found Chau guilty of double murder while finding his accomplice Tse not guilty on both counts of murder. He described Chau as "an extremely dangerous man" and "an actor" who would lie to anybody.

== Background ==
The main culprit of the case, Henry Chau Hoi-leung, was born on 7 June 1983, and was 29 years old when the case happened. According to Chau's friends, Chau has "lived in his own world" since he was a child. According to his friend who has known him for many years, Chau resented his parents because his parents forced him to learn piano when he was in elementary school. In secondary school, he also failed to keep up with his academic performance due to emotional problems, had difficulty getting along with his classmates, and failed the Hong Kong Certificate of Education Examination. Later, his parents arranged for Chau to study in Australia. During this period, he suffered discrimination and bullying many times, as well as the experience of "being beaten by black people every time they saw him". After Chau returned to Hong Kong in 2003, he would not express his thoughts to his friends, and his personality was relatively withdrawn.

The second defendant in the case is Angus Tse Chun-kei, who is of Macanese descent from his father. A friend of his recalled that Tse had a gentle and pure personality, and Tse once dated his sister. Later, Tse went to New Zealand and met a woman, but was cheated out of money by her. After returning to Hong Kong in 2010, he tried to commit suicide three times at home by burning charcoal, taking rat poison, and swallowing mercury. His sister rescued him when she returned home in time. Because of this, however, he suffered permanent brain damage resulting in cognitive decline and poor memory. Later, Tse's mentality was to "muddle through his days".

== Timeline of events ==
On 12 March 2013, five days after filing a missing persons report, the two Chau brothers heard from the police that there were no (departure) records of their parents leaving Hong Kong. Thus on 13 March 2013, Henry Chau Hoi-leung and his older brother approached Apple Daily, claiming that they had not heard from their parents since 2 March. Chau stated that before their disappearance, his parents had informed him that they were planning to travel to mainland China. The brothers then created a Facebook page titled, "My missing dad and mom", and asked their friends and the public for any information that could link to their parents' whereabouts.

On 14 March 2013, Henry Chau was invited to the police station for further questioning. Apple Daily released articles about the Chau brothers' struggle to find their missing parents. During the police interview, Chau texted his friends in a WhatsApp group "HK-Tekken" and confessed to the crime. Chau even described the details and reasons for the murder.

On 15 March 2013, a day after the interview, Chau and his friend, Angus Tse Chun-kei, were indicted for killing and dismembering Chau's parents in Tse's Tai Kok Tsui flat in the Hoi Hing Building, Kok Cheung Street. According to reports, Chau invited his parents to visit Tse's flat, telling them that it was a new flat he had just rented, and murdered his parents with Tse.

== Deaths of Glory Chau and Moon Siu ==
During further interrogation and investigation, Chau claimed that he and Tse coordinated the attack the moment Glory Chau and Moon Siu arrived in the living room because this was the time "when they felt ready". Chau described his accomplice Tse as a "very powerful" man who covered Moon Siu's mouth from behind while slashing her throat. Henry Chau admitted to stabbing his father in the back of the neck, but stated Tse had finished the job by slashing Glory Chau's throat. The autopsy report further confirmed the cause of death.

Chau returned to the Tai Kok Tsui crime scene four days after the incident, at the time when Tse already had all the body parts dismembered, salted, refrigerated, and dried. Chau described his role in the double murder as 'killing only', while Tse dismembered the bodies.

According to Chau, Tse initially attempted to disguise the remains as bricks by covering them with cement and sand. Then he came up with an easier plan to cook the remains of the bodies and disguise them as char siu, barbecued pork. Some of the remains were also covered with sand and thrown into the sea. During the investigation held on 15 March 2013, the heads of the two victims were found inside the two separate refrigerators. In those refrigerators, lunch boxes containing microwaved human flesh, and three bags containing chopped limbs and other body parts were found. According to the video interviews shown to the jury, Chau said that his father was "an arrogant man who left [Chau] without a moment of peace" while his mother "always looked sad when [Chau] did not contribute to the family." "I thought that if I could resolve the emotional connection with my parents, it would be a solution," he said. "If they died, I could be reborn." He blamed his parents for his failures in life, such as his father distracting his studies by watching television at a high volume, and his mother forcing him to practice the piano and humiliating him in front of a girl.

== Trial proceedings ==
The Court of First Instance, HKSAR v. Chau Henry and Another (20/03/2015, HCCC376/2013), began the first hearing on 4 August 2014, with both Chau and Tse as the defendants. The initial jury of seven was reduced to six during the first week of testimony. Soon after, another jury member asked for dismissal due to the psychological stress burdening him. On 13 August 2014, High Court Deputy Judge Michael Stuart-Moore announced that the case would have to be restarted with a fresh jury of nine.

The trial resumed in February 2015. Throughout the course of the trial, Chau's defense argued on the basis of diminished responsibility due to his mental instability, while the prosecution stressed the meticulous planning of Henry Chau and his multiple confessions.

On 9 March 2015, the defense lawyer, Nicholas Adams, called psychiatrist Chung Ka-fai to the stand. Chung diagnosed Chau with bipolar disorder and obsessive–compulsive disorder. Chung stated that Chau had experienced many suicidal thoughts after dropping out of college, being rejected by women, and being unemployed, giving a possible psychological trigger for the murder.

The consultant of Siu Lam Psychiatric Centre, Lui Sing-Heung, conducted an IQ test for Tse and Chau. Chau's IQ was found to be 126, higher than average, while Tse's IQ is 84. Lui argued the possibility that Chau, having such a higher IQ than Tse, could have manipulated and framed Tse for the murder. On 20 March 2015, the verdict was passed. High Court deputy judge Michael Stuart-Moore found Chau guilty of double murder while finding his accomplice Tse not guilty on both counts of murder. Chau was sentenced to life imprisonment while Tse was sentenced to one year for preventing the lawful burial of the bodies. As Tse had already been detained for two years on remand, he was released immediately.

== In popular culture ==
The case was adapted into two episodes of the Chinese-language miniseries Stained (心冤; debuted 2017) produced by Fox Networks Group Asia and directed by Patrick Kong. The case was also adapted in the TVB 2018 Anniversary drama OMG, Your Honour (是咁的，法官閣下) as the final case.

The case was also adapted into a 2022 film The Sparring Partner (正義迴廊), directed by Ho Chuek-Tin and produced by Philip Yung, premiered at The 46th Hong Kong International Film Festival and released on October 27, 2022 in theatres.

== See also ==
- List of solved missing person cases (post-2000)
- Murder of Abby Choi
- Hello Kitty murder case
- Eight Immortals Restaurant murders
- Lam Kor-wan
- Braemar Hill murders
