= Hong Kong Film Awards =

Annual film award

Hong Kong Film Awards 香港電影金像獎
- Current: 44th Hong Kong Film Awards
- Awarded for: Achievements in filmmaking
- Location: Hong Kong
- Presented by: Hong Kong Film Awards Association Ltd
- Reward: Hong Kong Film Award statuette
- First award: 9 March 1982
- Website: www.hkfaa.com

The Hong Kong Film Awards (HKFA; Chinese: 香港電影金像獎), founded in 1982, is an annual film awards ceremony in Hong Kong. The ceremonies typically take place in April, and have mostly been held at the Grand Theatre of the Hong Kong Cultural Centre since 1991. The awards recognise achievement in various aspects of filmmaking, such as directing, screenwriting, acting and cinematography. The awards are regarded as the Hong Kong equivalent of the Academy Awards.

The HKFA, incorporated into Hong Kong Film Awards Association Ltd. since December 1993, are currently managed by a board of directors, which consists of representatives from thirteen professional film bodies in Hong Kong. Voting on eligible films for the HKFA is conducted January through March every year and is open to all registered voters, which include local film workers as well as critics, and a selected group of adjudicators.

== General rules ==
The Hong Kong Film Awards are open to all Hong Kong films which are longer than an hour and commercially released in Hong Kong within the previous calendar year. A film qualifies as a Hong Kong film if it satisfies two of the three criteria, namely: the film director is a Hong Kong resident, at least one film company is registered in Hong Kong, and at least six persons of the production crew are Hong Kong residents. Since 2002, the HKFA also feature a Best Asian Film category, which accepts non-Hong Kong films which are commercially released in Hong Kong.

In January each year, a first round of election, open to all registered voters and a selected group of 100 professional adjudicators, is held to determine the five nominees for each award category. In the rare case where there is a tie between two nominees within the top five slots, six nominees will be allowed. Nominations are usually announced in February, after which a second round of election is held to determine the winner. Voting in the second round is open to a group of 50 professional adjudicators, Executive Committee members of the HKFA, as well as members of the thirteen professional film bodies. Each voting group holds a percentage of the ultimate score for each nominee, and each film body holds a higher share in the categories associated with it.

== Board of directors ==
The Board of Directors consists of representatives from thirteen professional film bodies in Hong Kong, listed below.

- City Entertainment
- Hong Kong Kowloon and New Territories Motion Picture Industry Association
- Hong Kong Film Directors' Guild
- Hong Kong Theatres Association
- Hong Kong Society of Cinematographers
- Hong Kong Movie Production Executives Association
- Hong Kong Cinematography Lighting Association
- Hong Kong Stuntman Association
- Hong Kong Screen Writer's Guild
- Hong Kong Performing Artistes Guild
- Hong Kong Film Arts Association
- Hong Kong Society of Film Editors
- Hong Kong Chamber of Films

== Categories ==
The Hong Kong Film Awards currently feature 19 regular categories, listed below.

- Best Film
- Best Director
- Best Screenplay
- Best Actor
- Best Actress
- Best Supporting Actor
- Best Supporting Actress
- Best New Performer
- Best New Director
- Best Cinematography
- Best Film Editing
- Best Art Direction
- Best Costume Make Up Design
- Best Action Choreography
- Best Original Film Score
- Best Sound Design
- Best Original Film Song
- Best Visual Effects
- Best Asian Chinese Language Film

== Winners of Best Film Over the Years ==
Year	Best Film	Original title	Director	Origin
1982	Father and Son	父子情	Allen Fong	Hong Kong
1983	Boat People	投奔怒海	Ann Hui	Hong Kong
1984	Ah Ying	半邊人	Allen Fong	Hong Kong
1985	Homecoming	似水流年	Ho Yim	Hong Kong / China
1986	Police Story	警察故事	Jackie Chan	Hong Kong
1987	A Better Tomorrow	英雄本色	John Woo	Hong Kong
1988	An Autumn's Tale	秋天的童話	Mabel Cheung	Hong Kong
1989	Rouge	胭脂扣	Stanley Kwan	Hong Kong
1990	Beyond the Sunset	飛越黃昏	Jacob Cheung	Hong Kong
1991	Days of Being Wild	阿飛正傳	Wong Kar-wai	Hong Kong
1992	To Be Number One	跛豪	Poon Man Kit	Hong Kong
1993	Cageman	籠民	Jacob Cheung	Hong Kong
1994	C'est la vie, mon chéri	新不了情	Tung-Shing Yee	Hong Kong
1995	Chungking Express	重慶森林	Wong Kar-wai	Hong Kong
1996	Summer Snow	女人四十	Ann Hui	Hong Kong
1997	Comrades: Almost a Love Story	甜蜜蜜	Peter Chan	Hong Kong
1998	Made in Hong Kong	香港製造	Fruit Chan	Hong Kong
1999	Beast Cops	野獸刑警	Gordon Chan & Dante Lam	Hong Kong
2000	Ordinary Heroes	千言萬語	Ann Hui	Hong Kong / China
2001	Crouching Tiger, Hidden Dragon	臥虎藏龍	Ang Lee	Taiwan / Hong Kong / China / United States
2002	Shaolin Soccer	少林足球	Stephen Chow	Hong Kong / China
2003	Infernal Affairs	無間道	Wai-keung Lau & Alan Mak	Hong Kong
2004	Running on Karma	大隻佬	Johnnie To & Ka-Fai Wai	Hong Kong
2005	Kung Fu Hustle	功夫	Stephen Chow	Hong Kong / China
2006	Election	黑社會	Johnnie To	Hong Kong
2007	After This Our Exile	父子	Patrick Tam	Hong Kong
2008	The Warlords	投名狀	Peter Chan & Raymond Yip	Hong Kong / China
2009	Ip Man	葉問	Wilson Yip	Hong Kong
2010	Bodyguards and Assassins	十月圍城	Teddy Chan	China / Hong Kong
2011	Gallants	打擂台	Clement Cheng & Derek Kwok	Hong Kong
2012	A Simple Life	桃姐	Ann Hui	Hong Kong
2013	Cold War	寒戰	Lok Man Leung & Kim-ching Luk	Hong Kong
2014	The Grandmaster	一代宗師	Wong Kar-wai	Hong Kong / China
2015	The Golden Era	黃金時代	Ann Hui	Hong Kong / China
2016	Ten Years	十年	Ng Ka-leung, Jevons Au, Chow Kwun-Wai, Fei-Pang Wong, Kwok Zune	Hong Kong
2017	Trivisa	樹大招風	Frank Hui, Jevons Au, Vicky Wong	Hong Kong
2018	Our Time Will Come	明月幾時有	Ann Hui	Hong Kong / China
2019	Project Gutenberg	無雙	Felix Chong	Hong Kong / China
2020	Better Days	少年的你	Derek Tsang	Hong Kong / China
2022	Raging Fire	怒火	Benny Chan	Hong Kong
2023	To My Nineteen-Year-Old Self	給十九歳的我	Mabel Cheung & William Kwok	Hong Kong
2024	A Guilty Conscience	毒舌大狀	Jack Ng	Hong Kong
2025	Twilight of the Warriors: Walled In	九龍城寨之圍城	Soi Cheang	Hong Kong

== Records ==
=== Mosts ===
- Most wins for a film: The Grandmaster — won 12 awards in 2014, including Best Film, Best Director, Best Screenplay, Best Actress, Best Supporting Actor, Best Cinematography, Best Film Editing, Best Art Direction, Best Costume & Make Up Design, Best Action Choreography, Best Sound Design and Best Original Film Score.
- Most wins for Best Director: Ann Hui — awarded 6 times in 1983, 1996, 2009, 2012, 2015 and 2018.
- Most wins for Best Actor: Tony Leung Chiu Wai — awarded 6 times in 1995, 1998, 2001, 2003, 2005, and 2024.
- Most wins for Best Actress: Maggie Cheung — awarded 5 times in 1990, 1993, 1997, 1998 and 2001.
- Most wins for Best Supporting Actor: Five actors with 2 times each.
  - Tony Leung Chiu Wai
  - Paul Chun
  - Anthony Wong Chau Sang
  - Liu Kai-Chi
  - Eric Tsang
- Most wins for Best Supporting Actress: Elaine Jin — awarded 4 times in 1987, 1988, 2016 and 2017.
- Most nominations for a film:
  - Bodyguards and Assassins — received 18 nominations in 2010 and won 8 including Best Film.
  - The Last Dance — received 18 nominations in 2025 and won 5 awards without winning Best Film, which would be won by Twilight of the Warriors: Walled In.
- Most nominations for Best Director: Johnnie To — nominated 18 times between his first nomination in 1990 and his latest in 2017.
- Most nominations for Best Actor: Lau Ching-wan — nominated 18 times between his first nomination in 1994 and his latest in 2025.
- Most nominations for Best Actress: Sylvia Chang — nominated 12 times between her first nomination in 1983 and her latest in 2023.
- Most nominations without win: Chin Ka-lok — nominated 14 times between his first nomination for Best Supporting Actor in 1996 and his latest for Best Action Choreography in 2024, and not a single win.
- Most consecutive wins in the same category:
  - Arthur Wong, awarded Best Cinematography in 1998, 1999 and 2000.
  - Kinson Tsang, awarded Best Sound Design in 2016, 2017 and 2018.
  - Wu Lilu, awarded Best Costume Make Up Design in 2020, 2022 and 2023.

=== Firsts ===
- First winner: Kara Hui — awarded Best Actress in the 1st Hong Kong Film Awards, making her the first recipient of the Hong Kong Film Awards.
- First non-Hong Kong resident winner: Song Hongrong — born in Mainland China, awarded Best Art Direction in 1984.
- First non-Hong Kong resident winner for Best Actor: Jet Li — born in Mainland China, awarded Best Actor in 2008 for his role in film The Warlords.
- First non-Hong Kong resident winner for Best Actress: Siqin Gaowa — born in Mainland China, awarded Best Actress in 1985 for her role in film Homecoming.

=== Special ===
- The films winning all 5 major awards (film, director, screenplay, actor, actress):
  - Summer Snow by Ann Hui in 1996.
  - A Simple Life by Ann Hui in 2012.

== Best 100 Chinese Motion Pictures ==
To celebrate a century of Chinese cinema, the Hong Kong Film Awards unveiled a list of Best 100 Chinese Motion Pictures (which in fact includes 103 films) during the 24th Hong Kong Film Awards ceremony on 27 March 2005. The list, selected by a panel of 101 filmmakers, critics and scholars, includes 24 films from Mainland China (11 from pre-1949 and 13 from post-1949), 61 from Hong Kong, 16 from Taiwan, and 2 co-productions.

Rank	Title	Year	Region	Language	Director(s)
1	Spring in a Small Town	1948	China	Mandarin	Fei Mu
2	A Better Tomorrow	1986	Hong Kong	Cantonese	John Woo
3	Days of Being Wild	1990	Hong Kong	Cantonese (+)	Wong Kar-wai
4	Yellow Earth	1984	China	Mandarin	Chen Kaige
5	City of Sadness	1989	Taiwan	Taiwanese (+)	Hou Hsiao-hsien
6	Long Arm of the Law	1984	Hong Kong	Cantonese	Johnny Mak
7	Dragon Gate Inn	1967	Taiwan	Mandarin	King Hu
8	Boat People	1982	Hong Kong	Cantonese (+)	Ann Hui
9	A Touch of Zen	1971	Taiwan	Mandarin	King Hu
10	Crouching Tiger, Hidden Dragon	2000	China/Hong Kong/Taiwan/United States	Mandarin	Ang Lee
11	Street Angel	1937	China	Mandarin	Yuan Muzhi
12	A Brighter Summer Day	1991	Taiwan	Mandarin (+)	Edward Yang
13	The Private Eyes	1976	Hong Kong	Cantonese	Michael Hui
14	The Mission	1999	Hong Kong	Cantonese	Johnnie To
15	One-Armed Swordsman	1967	Hong Kong	Mandarin	Chang Cheh
16	Fist of Fury	1972	Hong Kong	Mandarin / English	Lo Wei
17	In the Heat of the Sun	1994	China	Mandarin	Jiang Wen
18	In the Face of Demolition	1953	Hong Kong	Cantonese	Lee Tit
19	A Chinese Odyssey	1995	Hong Kong	Cantonese / Mandarin	Jeffery Lau
20	The Arch	1970	Hong Kong	Mandarin	Tang Shu Shuen
21	Rouge	1987	Hong Kong	Cantonese	Stanley Kwan
22	Chungking Express	1994	Hong Kong	Cantonese (+)	Wong Kar-wai
23	Homecoming	1984	Hong Kong	Cantonese / Mandarin	Yim Ho
24	The Time to Live and the Time to Die	1985	Taiwan	Mandarin / Taiwanese	Hou Hsiao-hsien
25	Red Sorghum	1987	China	Mandarin	Zhang Yimou
26	Father and Son	1981	Hong Kong	Cantonese	Allen Fong
27	The Spring River Flows East	1947	China	Mandarin	Cai Chusheng, Zheng Junli
28	Comrades: Almost a Love Story	1996	Hong Kong	Cantonese	Peter Chan
29	The Goddess	1934	China	(Silent)	Wu Yonggang
30	The Big Road	1934	China	(Silent)	Sun Yu
31	The Secret	1979	Hong Kong	Cantonese	Ann Hui
32	Infernal Affairs	2002	Hong Kong	Cantonese	Andrew Lau, Alan Mak
33	Drunken Master	1978	Hong Kong	Cantonese	Yuen Woo-Ping
34	The Butterfly Murders	1979	Hong Kong	Cantonese	Tsui Hark
35	Ashes of Time	1994	Hong Kong	Cantonese	Wong Kar-wai
36	Made in Hong Kong	1997	Hong Kong	Cantonese	Fruit Chan
37	Sorrows of the Forbidden City	1948	China	Mandarin	Zhu Shilin
38	The Love Eterne	1963	Hong Kong	Cantonese / Mandarin	Li Han-Hsiang
39	Story of a Discharged Prisoner	1967	Hong Kong	Cantonese	Patrick Lung Kong
40	Zu Warriors	1983	Hong Kong	Cantonese	Tsui Hark
41	Terrorizers	1986	Taiwan	Mandarin / Taiwanese	Edward Yang
42	The Killer	1989	Hong Kong	Cantonese	John Woo
43	Once Upon a Time in China	1991	Hong Kong	Cantonese / English	Tsui Hark
44	Center Stage	1992	Hong Kong	Mandarin (+)	Stanley Kwan
45	The Story of Qiu Ju	1992	China	Mandarin	Zhang Yimou
46	This Life of Mine	1950	China	Mandarin	Shi Hui
47	Kingdom and the Beauty	1959	Hong Kong	Mandarin	Li Han Hsiang
48	The Winter	1969	Taiwan	Mandarin	Li Han Hsiang
49	An Autumn's Tale	1987	Hong Kong	Cantonese (+)	Mabel Cheung
50	A Chinese Ghost Story	1987	Hong Kong	Cantonese	Ching Siu-Tung
51	The Purple Hairpin	1959	Hong Kong	Cantonese	Lee Tit
52	The Orphan	1960	Hong Kong	Cantonese	Lee Sun-Fung
53	Two Stage Sisters	1965	China	Mandarin	Xie Jin
54	City on Fire	1987	Hong Kong	Cantonese / Mandarin	Ringo Lam
55	Farewell My Concubine	1993	Hong Kong/China	Mandarin	Chen Kaige
56	Yi Yi	2000	Taiwan	Mandarin / Taiwanese	Edward Yang
57	Cold Nights	1955	Hong Kong	Cantonese	Lee Sun-fung
58	At Dawn	1967	Taiwan		Sung Tsun-shou
59	Raining in the Mountain	1979	Taiwan	Mandarin	King Hu
60	Police Story	1985	Hong Kong	Cantonese	Jackie Chan
61	C'est la vie, mon chéri	1993	Hong Kong	Cantonese	Derek Yee
62	The Wedding Banquet	1993	Taiwan	Mandarin / English	Ang Lee
63	Platform	2000	China	Mandarin	Jia Zhangke
64	The Wild, Wild Rose	1960	Hong Kong	Mandarin	Wang Tian-Lin
65	The Great Devotion	1960	Hong Kong	Cantonese	Chor Yuen
66	My Intimate Partner	1960	Hong Kong	Cantonese	Kim Chun
67	Dangerous Encounters of the First Kind	1980	Hong Kong	Cantonese	Tsui Hark
68	Ah Ying / Ban Bian Ren	1983	Hong Kong	Cantonese / Mandarin / English	Allen Fong
69	Durian Durian	2000	Hong Kong	Cantonese / Mandarin	Fruit Chan
70	Little Toys	1933	China	(Silent)	Sun Yu
71	Ai le zhongnian	1949	China	Mandarin	Sang Hu
72	The House of 72 Tenants	1973	Hong Kong	Cantonese	Chor Yuen
73	Nomad	1982	Hong Kong	Cantonese	Patrick Tam
74	Dust in the Wind	1986	Taiwan		Hou Hsiao-hsien
75	92 Legendary La Rose Noire	1992	Hong Kong	Cantonese	Jeffrey Lau
76	Shaolin Soccer	2001	Hong Kong	Cantonese	Stephen Chow
77	Song at Midnight	1937	China	Mandarin	Ma-Xu Weibang
78	China Behind	1974	Hong Kong		Tang Shu Shuen
79	The Spooky Bunch	1980	Hong Kong	Cantonese	Ann Hui
80	Taipei Story	1985	Taiwan	Mandarin	Edward Yang
81	The Blue Kite	1993	China	Mandarin	Tian Zhuangzhuang
82	Long Live the Missus!	1948	China	Mandarin	Sang Hu
83	Mambo Girl	1957	Hong Kong	Mandarin	Yi Wen
84	Feast of a Rich Family	1959	Hong Kong	Cantonese	Lee Sun-Fung, Lee Tit, Ng Wui, Lo Ji-Hung
85	Execution in Autumn	1972	Taiwan	Mandarin	Lee Hsing
86	Hibiscus Town	1986	China	Mandarin	Xie Jin
87	God of Gamblers	1989	Hong Kong	Cantonese	Wong Jing
88	As Tears Go By	1988	Hong Kong	Cantonese / Mandarin	Wong Kar-wai
89	Happy Together	1997	Hong Kong	Mandarin / Cantonese / Spanish	Wong Kar-wai
90	In the Mood for Love	2000	Hong Kong	Cantonese / Shanghainese	Wong Kar-wai
91	Myriad of Lights	1948	China	Mandarin	Shen Fu
92	Festival Moon	1953	Hong Kong	Mandarin	Zhu Shilin
93	Parents' Hearts	1955	Hong Kong	Cantonese	Kim Chun
94	Lin Zexu	1959	China	Mandarin	Zheng Junli, Cen Fan
95	Dream of the Red Chamber	1962	China	Mandarin	Cen Fan
96	Digital Master	1983	Hong Kong	Cantonese	Kirk Wong
97	Shanghai Blues	1984	Hong Kong	Cantonese	Tsui Hark
98	The Eight Diagram Pole Fighter	1984	Hong Kong	Cantonese	Lau Kar-Leung
99	The Black Cannon Incident	1985	China	Mandarin	Huang Jianxin
100	Rebels of the Neon God	1992	Taiwan	Mandarin / Taiwanese	Tsai Ming-liang
101	The Puppetmaster	1993	Taiwan	Mandarin / Taiwanese / Japanese	Hou Hsiao-hsien
102	Summer Snow	1995	Hong Kong	Cantonese	Ann Hui
103	Not One Less	1998	China	Mandarin	Zhang Yimou

== Presenters ==
Year	Ceremony	Presenter/s
1982	1	Eric Ng and Zhan Xiaoping
1983	2	Eric Tsang and Josephine Siao
1984	3	Chung King-fai
1985	4	Winnie Yu
1986	5	Winnie Yu
1987	6	Carol Cheng and Chung King-fai
1988	7	Lydia Shum and Paul Chung
1989	8	Lydia Shum, Eric Tsang and Philip Chan
1990	9	Philip Chan and John Sham
1991	10	Anita Mui and Philip Chan
1992	11	Philip Chan and Lawrence Cheng
1993	12	Lydia Shum and John Sham
1994	13	Lydia Shum and John Sham
1995	14	John Sham and Meg Lam
1996	15	Sandra Ng, Dayo Wong and Veronica Yip
1997	16	Lydia Shum and Nancy Sit
1998	17	Carol Cheng and Cheung Tat Ming
1999	18	Carol Cheng, Cheung Tat Ming, Vincent Kok, Chin Ka Lok and Jerry Lamb
2000	19	Eric Tsang, Sandra Ng and Vincent Kok
2001	20	Carol Cheng, Eric Tsang, Gigi Leung and Eric Ng
2002	21	Eric Tsang, Cecilia Yip, Cheung Tat Ming and Jacqueline Pang
2003	22	Eric Tsang, John Sham, Athena Chu and Anna Yau Hoi Man
2004	23	Dayo Wong, Candice Yu, Athena Chu, Josie Ho, Bowie Tsang, Cherrie Ying and Ada Choi
2005	24	Carol Cheng and Lawrence Cheng
2006	25	Eric Tsang, Teresa Mo and Chapman To
2007	26	Nick Cheung, Bowie Tsang and Lam Chi-chung
2008	27	Carol Cheng, Sandra Ng and Sammi Cheng
2009	28	Eric Tsang, Sandra Ng, Teresa Mo, Vincent Kok, Kay Tse, Denise Ho, Chin Ka Lok, Fan Siu Wong, Wong Cho Lam, Lam Chi Chung, Tin Kai-man and Michelle Loo
2010	29	Lawrence Cheng
2011	30	Lawrence Cheng, Teresa Mo and Vincent Kok
2012	31	Eric Tsang, Gordon Lam, Bowie Tsang, Ronald Cheng and Angelababy
2013	32	Eric Tsang, Gordon Lam, Ronald Cheng and Jerry Lamb
2014	33	Teresa Mo, Gordon Lam and Ronald Cheng
2015	34	Jordan Chan, Gordon Lam and Miriam Yeung
2016	35	Lau Ching Wan
2017	36	Ronald Cheng
2018	37	Charlene Choi and Louis Cheung
2019	38	Hedwig Tam, Neo Yau, Venus Wong, Babyjohn Choi, Angela Yuen, Lam Yiu-sing, Kaki Sham, To Siu Kiu, Kevin Chu, Shirley Chan, Himmy Wong, Jennifer Yu, Cecilia So, Kochun Tse, Rachel Leung, Yatho Wong, Koyi Mak, Ling Man-lung, Zeno Koo, Hanna Chan, Ashina Kwok, Siuyea Lo, Larine Tang, Kyle Li, Carmen Tong, Ng Siu Hin, Kelvin Chan, Gladys Li, Enson Lau, Fish Liew, Tony Wu and Rose Chan
2020	39	None (Note: The winners were announced by Derek Yee, the then-chairman of the Hong Kong Film Awards Association.)
2022	40	Kearen Pang

== See also ==
- Hong Kong Film Awards statue
- Avenue of Stars, Hong Kong
- Hong Kong International Film Festival
