= Hong Kong Film Award for Best Film =

Annual Chinese film award

- Awarded for: Best Hong Kong film of the year
- Country: Hong Kong
- Presented by: Hong Kong Film Awards
- First award: 1982
- Currently held by: Ciao UFO (2026)

The Hong Kong Film Award for Best Film is an annual Hong Kong industry award presented to the films which is considered the best of the year.

== History ==
The award was established at the 1st Hong Kong Film Awards (1982) and the first winner and the sole participant in this category was Father and Son, a film by Allen Fong. From the 2nd Hong Kong Film Awards (1983), there are 5, sometimes 6, nominations for the category of Best Film from which one film is chosen the winner of the Hong Kong Film Award for Best Film. The most recent recipient of the award was To My Nineteen Year Old Self, a documentary directed by Mabel Cheung and William Kwok and produced by Eunice Wong, which was honoured at the 41st Hong Kong Film Awards (2023).

== Winners and nominees ==
=== 1982 — 1999 ===
Year	Film	Producer(s)	Production Company	Note
1982 (1st)	Father and Son	Wong Kai-chuen	Phoenix Motion Picture Company	
1983 (2nd)	Boat People	Xia Meng	Bluebird Film Company Greenworld Company	
1983 (2nd)	Lonely Fifteen	Johnny Mak Tong-hung	Pearl City Films	
1983 (2nd)	The Prodigal Son	Raymond Chow	Golden Harvest	
1983 (2nd)	Coolie Killer	Dennis Yu Jeffrey Lau	Century Motion Picture	
1983 (2nd)	Nomad	Jeffrey Lau Dennis Yu	Century Motion Picture	
1984 (3rd)	Ah Ying			
1984 (3rd)	Burning of the Imperial Palace			
1984 (3rd)	The Dead and the Deadly			
1984 (3rd)	Zu Warriors from the Magic Mountain			
1984 (3rd)	Health Warning			
1985 (4th)	Homecoming			
1985 (4th)	Shanghai Blues			
1985 (4th)	Long Arm of the Law			
1985 (4th)	Hong Kong 1941			
1986 (5th)	Police Story			
1986 (5th)	The Illegal Immigrant			
1986 (5th)	Mr. Vampire			
1986 (5th)	Women			
1987 (6th)	A Better Tomorrow			
1987 (6th)	Brotherhood			
1987 (6th)	Just Like Weather			
1987 (6th)	The Lunatics			
1987 (6th)	The Last Emperor			
1987 (6th)	Love Unto Waste			
1988 (7th)	An Autumn's Tale			
1988 (7th)	A Chinese Ghost Story			
1988 (7th)	City on Fire			
1988 (7th)	Tin Po San			
1988 (7th)	The Romance of Book & Sword	Ann Hui		
1988 (7th)	Final Victory			
1989 (8th)	Rouge			
1989 (8th)	Gangs			
1989 (8th)	Painted Faces			
1989 (8th)	As Tears Go By			
1989 (8th)	Chicken and Duck Talk			
1990 (9th)	Beyond the Sunset			
1990 (9th)	All About Ah-Long			
1990 (9th)	The Killer			
1990 (9th)	A Fishy Story			
1990 (9th)	Eight Taels of Gold			
1991 (10th)	Days of Being Wild	Wong Kar-wai		
1991 (10th)	A Terra-Cotta Warrior			
1991 (10th)	Song of the Exile	Ann Hui		
1991 (10th)	Red Dust			
1991 (10th)	Farewell China			
1992 (11th)	To Be Number One			
1992 (11th)	Once a Thief			
1992 (11th)	This Thing Called Love			
1992 (11th)	Lee Rock			
1992 (11th)	Once Upon a Time in China			
1993 (12th)	Cageman			
1993 (12th)	92 Legendary La Rose Noire			
1993 (12th)	King of Beggars			
1993 (12th)	Once Upon a Time in China II			
1993 (12th)	Center Stage			
1994 (13th)	C'est la vie, mon chéri			
1994 (13th)	Crime Story			
1994 (13th)	Always on My Mind			
1994 (13th)	Tom, Dick and Hairy			
1994 (13th)	Temptation of a Monk			
1995 (14th)	Chungking Express	Wong Kar-wai		
1995 (14th)	Ashes of Time	Wong Kar-wai		
1995 (14th)	He's a Woman, She's a Man			
1995 (14th)	I Have a Date with Spring			
1995 (14th)	The Final Option			
1996 (15th)	Summer Snow	Ann Hui		
1996 (15th)	Full Throttle			
1996 (15th)	Fallen Angels	Wong Kar-wai		
1996 (15th)	The Day the Sun Turned Cold			
1996 (15th)	Rumble in the Bronx			
1997 (16th)	Comrades: Almost a Love Story	Peter Chan		
1997 (16th)	Police Story 4: First Strike			
1997 (16th)	Viva Erotica			
1997 (16th)	Hu Du Men			
1997 (16th)	Big Bullet			
1998 (17th)	Made in Hong Kong			
1998 (17th)	Happy Together	Wong Kar-wai		
1998 (17th)	Full Alert			
1998 (17th)	The Soong Sisters			
1998 (17th)	Lifeline			
1999 (18th)	Beast Cops			
1999 (18th)	Who Am I?			
1999 (18th)	The Longest Summer			
1999 (18th)	City of Glass			
1999 (18th)	The Storm Riders			

=== 2000 — present ===
Year	Film	Producer(s)	Production Company	Note
2000 (19th)	Ordinary Heroes	Ann Hui	Class Limited	
2000 (19th)	Little Cheung	Doris Yang & Makoto Ueda	Nicetop Independent Ltd & NHK Japan Broadcasting Corporation	
2000 (19th)	The Mission	Johnnie To	Milkyway Image (HK) Ltd.	
2000 (19th)	Fly Me to Polaris	David Chan	GH Pictures (China) Ltd, Deltamac Company Limited & Sil-Metropole Organisation Limited	
2000 (19th)	Running Out of Time	Johnnie To	Win's Entertainment Ltd	
2001 (20th)	Crouching Tiger, Hidden Dragon	Bill Kong, Hsu Li Kong & Ang Lee	Columbia Pictures Film Production Asia & Good Machine International	
2001 (20th)	In the Mood for Love	Wong Kar-wai	Block 2 Pictures Inc & Paradis Film	
2001 (20th)	Durian, Durian	Doris Yang	Nicetop Independent Ltd	
2001 (20th)	Needing You...	Johnnie To & Wai Ka-Fai	One Hundred Years of Film Co Ltd	
2001 (20th)	Jiang hu: The Triad Zone	Chan Hing Kai & Amy Chin	One Hundred Years of Film Co Ltd	
2002 (21st)	Shaolin Soccer	Yeung Kwok Fai	The Star Overseas Ltd & Universe Entertainment Ltd	
2002 (21st)	July Rhapsody	Ann Hui, Derek Yee	Filmko Pictures Ltd	
2002 (21st)	Lan Yu	Zhang Yong Ning, Kwan Siu Wai	Omico International Management Co Ltd	
2002 (21st)	Love on a Diet	Johnnie To & Wai Ka-Fai	One Hundred Years of Film Co Ltd	
2002 (21st)	Beijing Rocks	John Chong, Solon So, Alex Law	Media Asia Films (BVI) Ltd	
2003 (22nd)	Infernal Affairs	Andrew Lau	Media Asia Films Ltd	
2003 (22nd)	Golden Chicken	Peter Chan & Jo Jo Hui	Applause Pictures & Panorama Entertainment	
2003 (22nd)	Three: Going Home	Jo Jo Hui	Applause Pictures	
2003 (22nd)	Hollywood Hong Kong	Fruit Chan, Doris Yang, Kei Haruna & Sylvain Bursztejn	Nicetop Independent Ltd	
2003 (22nd)	Hero	Zang Yimou, Bill Kong	Elite Group Enterprises Inc.	
2004 (23rd)	Running on Karma	Johnnie To & Wai Ka-Fai	One Hundred Years of Film Co Ltd	
2004 (23rd)	PTU	Johnnie To	Mei Ah Production Co Ltd	
2004 (23rd)	Lost in Time	Henri Fong Ping	One Hundred Years of Film Co Ltd & Sil-Metropole Organisation Ltd	
2004 (23rd)	Infernal Affairs II	Andrew Lau	Media Asia Films Ltd, Raintree Pictures Pte Ltd & Eastern Dragon Film Co Ltd	
2004 (23rd)	Infernal Affairs III	Andrew Lau & Gao Feng Jun	Media Asia Films Ltd, Tianjin Film Studio, Eastern Dragon Film Co Ltd & CMC Group	
2005 (24th)	Kung Fu Hustle	Stephen Chow, Chui Po Chu, Jeffrey Lau, Han San Ping & Wang Zhong Lei	Columbia Pictures Film Production Asia Ltd, Beijing Film Studio of China Film Group Corporation & Huayi Brothers & Taihe Film Investment Co Ltd	
2005 (24th)	2046	Wong Kar-wai	Block 2 Pictures, Paradis Films, Classic SRL, Orly Films & Shanghai Film Group Corporation	
2005 (24th)	One Nite in Mongkok	Henri Fong Ping	Universe Entertainment Ltd & Sil-Metropole Organisation Ltd	
2005 (24th)	New Police Story	Willie Chan, Solon So, Benny Chan Muk-Sing & Barbie Tung	JCE Movies Ltd & China Film Group Corporation	
2005 (24th)	Breaking News	Johnnie To & Cao Biao	Media Asia Films Ltd & China Film Group Corporation	
2006 (25th)	Election	Johnnie To, Dennis Law Sau-Yiu	Milkyway Image (HK) Ltd & One Hundred Years Of Film Co Ltd	
2006 (25th)	The Myth	Willie Chan Chee Kheong, Solon So Che Hung & Barbie Tung Wun Sze	JCE Movies Ltd & China Film Group Corporation	
2006 (25th)	Initial D	Andrew Lau	Media Asia Films Ltd & Sil-Metropole Organisation Ltd	
2006 (25th)	Perhaps Love	Peter Chan & Andre Morgan	Astro-Shaw, Television Broadcasts Ltd & Stellar Megamedia Group Ltd	
2006 (25th)	Seven Swords	Tsui Hark, Lee Joo Ick, Ma Zhong Jun & Pan Zhizhong	Beijing Ciwen Film & TV Production Co Ltd, Boram Entertainment Inc, City Glory Pictures Ltd	
2007 (26th)	After This Our Exile	Chiu Li Kuang	Vision Film Workshop, Black & White Films Ltd	
2007 (26th)	Fearless	Bill Kong, Ronny Yu, Jet Li, Yang Buting	Hero China International Ltd & China Film Group Corporation Beijing Film Studio	
2007 (26th)	Election 2	Johnnie To, Dennis Law Sau-Yiu	One Hundred Years Of Film Co Ltd & Milkyway Image (HK) Ltd	
2007 (26th)	Exiled	Johnnie To	Media Asia Films Ltd	
2007 (26th)	Curse of the Golden Flower	Bill Kong, Zhang Weiping	Film Partner International Inc, Edko Films Ltd & Beijing New Picture Film Co Ltd	
2008 (27th)	The Warlords	Peter Chan, Andre Morgan, Huang Jian Xin	Media Asia Films Ltd, Morgan & Chan Films Ltd & China Film Group Corporation	
2008 (27th)	The Postmodern Life of My Aunt	Yuan Mei, Yu Dong & Cui Yong	Class Ltd, Cheerland Entertainment Organization & Beijing Polybona Film Distribution Co Ltd	
2008 (27th)	Eye in the Sky	Johnnie To, Tsui Siu Ming	Sundream Motion Pictures Ltd	
2008 (27th)	Mad Detective	Johnnie To & Wai Ka-Fai	One Hundred Years Of Films Co Ltd	
2008 (27th)	Protégé	Peter Chan	Artforce International Ltd, MediaCorp Raintree Pictures, Global Entertainment Group (Asia) Ltd, China Film Group Corporation & Polybona Film Distribution Co Ltd	
2009 (28th)	Ip Man	Raymond Wong	Mandarin Films Distribution Co Ltd	
2009 (28th)	CJ7	Stephen Chow, Chui Po Chu, Han San Ping, Vincent Kok, Shi Dong Ming, Connie Wong	Columbia Pictures Film Production Asia Ltd, Star Overseas, Beijing Film Studio of China Film Group Corporation	
2009 (28th)	Red Cliff	John Woo, Terence Chang	China Film Group Corporation, Avex Entertainment Inc., CMC Entertainment, Showbox, Lion Rock Productions, Chengtian Entertainment International Holdings Ltd	
2009 (28th)	Painted Skin	Gordon Chan	Golden Sun Films Holdings Ltd, MediaCorp Raintree Pictures Pte Ltd, NingXia Film Studio, Shanghai Film Group Corporation	
2009 (28th)	The Way We Are	Ann Hui, Wong Yat Ping	Mega-Vision Pictures Ltd	
2010 (29th)	Bodyguards and Assassins	Peter Chan		
2010 (29th)	KJ: Music and Life	Cheung King Wai		
2010 (29th)	Overheard	Alan Mak, Felix Chong		
2010 (29th)	Red Cliff II	John Woo		
2010 (29th)	Shinjuku Incident	Derek Yee		
2011 (30th)	Gallants	Gordon Lam		
2011 (30th)	Detective Dee and the Mystery of the Phantom Flame	Tsui Hark, Nansun Shi and Peggy Lee		
2011 (30th)	Ip Man 2	Raymond Wong		
2011 (30th)	Reign of Assassins	John Woo, Terence Chang, Ivy Zhong, Tina Shi and Lorraine Hoh		
2011 (30th)	The Stool Pigeon	Albert Lee, Wang Zhonglei and Cheung Hong-tat		
2012 (31st)	A Simple Life	Roger Lee, Ann Hui and Chan Pui Wah		
2012 (31st)	Life Without Principle	Johnnie To		
2012 (31st)	Flying Swords of Dragon Gate	Tsui Hark		
2012 (31st)	Overheard 2	Derek Yee		
2012 (31st)	Let the Bullets Fly	Ma Ke, Albert Lee, Yin Homber, Barbie Tung & Zhao Haicheng		
2013 (32nd)	Cold War	Bill Kong, Mathew Tang & Ivy Ho		
2013 (32nd)	Vulgaria	Pang Ho-cheung & Subi Liang		
2013 (32nd)	Motorway	Johnnie To		
2013 (32nd)	The Bullet Vanishes	Derek Yee, Mandy Law, Zhang Zhao & Albert Lee		
2013 (32nd)	The Viral Factor	Candy Leung		
2014 (33rd)	The Grandmaster	Ng See-yuen, Megan Ellison & Wong Kar-wai		
2014 (33rd)	Journey to the West: Conquering the Demons	Stephen Chow & Wang Zhonglei		
2014 (33rd)	Unbeatable	Candy Leung		
2014 (33rd)	The Way We Dance	Saville Chan & Roddy Wong		
2014 (33rd)	The White Storm	Benny Chan		
2015 (34th)	The Golden Era	Qin Hong		
2015 (34th)	Dearest	Peter Chan & Hui Yuet-chun		
2015 (34th)	Overheard 3	Derek Yee & Ronald Wong		
2015 (34th)	The Midnight After	Amy Chin		
2015 (34th)	Aberdeen	Kuo-fu Chen, Subi Liang, Ho-Cheung Pang & Zhonglei Wang		
2016 (35th)	Ten Years	Andrew Choi & Ng Ka Leung	Ten Years Studio Ltd	
2016 (35th)	Little Big Master	Benny Chan Muk Shing, Alvin Lam Siu Keung, Stanley Tong Man Hong	Universe Entertainment Ltd, Sil-Metropole Organisation Ltd, Sun Entertainment Culture Ltd, One Cool Film Production Ltd, Beijing Monster Pictures Co Ltd, Yunnan Parashorea Cathayensis Culture Communication Co Ltd, Yinming Culture Communication Co Ltd, Foshan Join Media Group Co Ltd	
2016 (35th)	The Taking of Tiger Mountain	Huang Jianxin	Bona Film Group Co Ltd, Huaxia Film Distribution Co Ltd, August First Film Studio, Wanda Media Co Ltd, China Movie Channel, Youku Tudou Film Inc, Shanghai Real Thing Media Co Ltd, Dream Sky Film Co Ltd, Bona Entertainment Co Ltd	
2016 (35th)	Ip Man 3	Raymond Wong	Pegasus Motion Pictures (HK) Ltd, Dreams Salon Entertainment Culture Ltd, Starbright Communications Ltd, My Pictures Studio	
2016 (35th)	Port of Call	Julia Chu, Esther Koo, Kingman Cho	Mei Ah Film Production Co Ltd, Mei Ah Entertainment Development Inc	
2017 (36th)	Trivisa	Johnnie To & Yau Nai-hoi	Media Asia Film Production Ltd & Beijing Hairun Pictures Co Ltd	
2017 (36th)	Soul Mate	Peter Chan, Jojo Hui	We Pictures Ltd, JOYCORE Pictures (Shanghai) Co Ltd, J.Q. Pictures Ltd, Alibaba Pictures Group Ltd, Huoerguosi Jiamei Pictures Co Ltd, Sky Grant Entertainment Ltd, JOYCORE Communication Co Ltd, Shanghai SMG Pictures Co Ltd, Applause Media (Beijing) Ltd	
2017 (36th)	The Mermaid	Stephen Chow, Y. Y. Kong	The Star Overseas Ltd, Alpha Pictures (Hong Kong) Ltd, China Film Co Ltd, Hehe (Shanghai) Film Corporation Ltd, Shannan Enlight Pictures Co Ltd, Shanghai New Culture Media Group Co Ltd, Shanghai Tianshi Culture Communication Co Ltd, China Cultural and Entertainment Fund L.P., Xiangshan Ze Yue Culture Media Co Ltd	
2017 (36th)	Cold War 2	Bill Kong, Ivy Ho, Jiang Ping	Edko Films Ltd, Irresistible Beta Ltd, Edko (Beijing) Films Ltd, Tencent Penguin Pictures (Shanghai) Co Ltd, China Film Co Ltd	
2017 (36th)	Weeds on Fire	Chan Hing-kai, O Sing-pui	Flash Glory Ltd	
2018 (37th)	Our Time Will Come	Ann Hui, Roger Lee & Stephen Lam	Bona Film Group, Class Limited, Distribution Workshop & Entertainment Team Media Group	
2018 (37th)	Shock Wave	Peter Chan, Jojo Hui	Universe Entertainment, Infinitus Entertainment, Bona Film Group	
2018 (37th)	Love Education	Patricia Cheng	Beijing Harirun Pictures, Dream Creek Productions	
2018 (37th)	Chasing the Dragon	Wong Jing, Donnie Yen, Andy Lau & Connie Wong	Mega-Vision Project Workshop, Bona Film Group Company, Infinitus Entertainment & Super Bullet	
2018 (37th)	Paradox	Cheang Pou-soi, Paco Wong, Ren Yue, Stanley Tong & Yang Guang	Sun Entertainment Film Group, Bona Film Group Company, Alibaba Pictures, Sunny Side Up (Never) Limited & Shanghai PMF Media YL Entertainment and Spors (YLES)	
2019 (38th)	Project Gutenberg	Ronald Wong	Pop Movies, Emperor Motion Pictures, Bona Film Group &Two Sixty Six Productions	
2019 (38th)	Three Husbands	Fruit Chan, Doris Yang		
2019 (38th)	Operation Red Sea	Candy Leung	Bona Film Group, Emperor Motion Pictures, Film Fireworks Production & Star Dream Studio Media	
2019 (38th)	Still Human	Fruit Chan	Golden Scene Company Limited	
2019 (38th)	Men on the Dragon	Joe Ma, Jacqueline Liu Yuen-Hung	One Cool Film Production Limited	
2020 (39th)	Better Days	Jojo Hui	Henan Film Group; China Wit Media; Tianijn Xiron Entertainment; We Pictures; Shooting Pictures	
2020 (39th)	Suk Suk	Michael J. Werner, Teresa Kwong, Sandy Yip, Chowee Leow	New Voice Film Productions	
2020 (39th)	Fagara	Ann Hui, Julia Chu		
2020 (39th)	I'm Livin' It	Soi Cheang		
2020 (39th)	The New King of Comedy	Stephen Chow, Y. Y. Kong		
2022 (40th)	Raging Fire	Benny Chan, Donnie Yen	Emperor Film Production Company	
2022 (40th)	Anita	Bill Kong, Ivy Ho, Tang Wai-but	Edko Films	
2022 (40th)	Limbo	Wilson Yip, Paco Wong	Sun Entertainment Culture	
2022 (40th)	Zero to Hero	Sandra Ng		
2022 (40th)	Drifting	Mani Man	mm2 Entertainment	
2023 (41st)	To My Nineteen Year Old Self	Eunice Wong	Ying Wa Girls' School	
2023 (41st)	The Sparring Partner	Philip Yung	Golden Scene; Mei Ah Entertainment	
2023 (41st)	Warriors of Future	Louis Koo, Tang Wai But	One Cool Film Production; Media Asia Film Production; World Universe Culture; iQiyi Motion Pictures (Beijing); Beijing Unimedia Television Culture; Tianjin Maoyan Weying Media; Shenzhen Film Studio; Shanghai CMC Pictures; Beijing Gutian Film and Television Production Shenzhen Film & Television Co.; Beijing Le Art Media & Culture Co.; Lok Tin Films Production	
2023 (41st)	Detective vs Sleuths	Wai Ka-fai; Jason Siu; Elaine Chu	Emperor Film Production; Beijing Super Lion Culture Communication	
2023 (41st)	The Narrow Road	Mani Man	mm2 Entertainment	
2024 (42nd)	A Guilty Conscience	Bill Kong, Ivy Ho	Edko Films; Alibaba Pictures; The Film Development Fund; Irresistible Beta Limited	
2024 (42nd)	In Broad Daylight	Philip Yung	One Cool Film Production Limited; The Joseph Lau Luen Hung Charitable Trust	
2024 (42nd)	Time Still Turns the Pages	Derek Yee	Roundtable Pictures Limited	
2024 (42nd)	Mad Fate	Johnnie To; Yau Nai Hoi; Elaine Chu	MakerVille Company Limited; Noble Castle Asia Limited	
2024 (42nd)	The Goldfinger	Ronald Wong	Emperor Film Production Company; Tianjin Maoyan Weying Cultural Media Company; Xin Hui Ying Film Culture	
2025 (43rd)	Twilight of the Warriors: Walled In	John Chong, Wilson Yip	Media Asia Films; Entertaining Power; One Cool Film Production Limited; Sil-Metropole Organisation; Lian Ray Pictures; HG Entertainment	
2025 (43rd)	Papa	Amy Chin	Word by Word; The Film Development Fund of Hong Kong; CCIDAHK; Yan Ley Investment Limited; Ling Ying Foundation	
2025 (43rd)	The Way We Talk	Adam Wong; Jacqueline Liu; Ho Hong	One Cool Film Production	
2025 (43rd)	The Last Dance	Anselm Chan; Jason Siu; Chan Sing-yan	Emperor Motion Pictures; Alibaba Pictures; AMTD Digital	
2025 (43rd)	All Shall Be Well	Michael J. Werner; Teresa Kwong; Sandy Yip; Chowee Leow; Stan Guingon	New Voice Film Productions	
2026 (44th)	Ciao UFO	Amy Chin, Bonnie Wong	Sun Pictures; Icon Group	
2026 (44th)	Another World	Polly Yeung; Chan Gin-kai	Point Five Productions; Silver Media Group	
2026 (44th)	Sons of the Neon Night	Juno Mak; Catherine Hun	One Cool Film Production; Sil-Metropole Organisation	
2026 (44th)	Back to the Past	Louis Koo; Tang Wai-but	One Cool Film Production	
2026 (44th)	She's Got No Name	Peter Chan	Tianjin Maoyan Weiying Culture Media; Huangxi Media; China Film Group	

== See also ==
- Hong Kong Film Award
- Hong Kong Film Award for Best Actor
- Hong Kong Film Award for Best Actress
- Hong Kong Film Award for Best Supporting Actor
- Hong Kong Film Award for Best Supporting Actress
- Hong Kong Film Award for Best Action Choreography
- Hong Kong Film Award for Best Cinematography
- Hong Kong Film Award for Best Director
- Hong Kong Film Award for Best New Performer
