= List of Hong Kong films of 1983 =

This article lists feature-length Hong Kong films released in 1983.

== Box office ==
The highest-grossing Hong Kong films released in 1983, by domestic box office gross revenue, are as follows:

Highest-grossing films released in 1983
Rank	Title	Domestic gross
1	Aces Go Places 2	HK$23,273,140
2	Winners & Sinners	HK$21,994,190
3	Project A	HK$19,323,824
4	The Burning of Imperial Palace	HK$15,439,323
5	Let's Make Laugh	HK$15,017,514
6	Esprit d'amour	HK$14,102,667
7	All the Wrong Spies	HK$13,782,062
8	The Perfect Wife?!	HK$12,472,847
9	Reign Behind a Curtain	HK$12,021,886
10	The Dead and the Deadly	HK$10,104,527

== Releases ==
Title	Director	Cast	Genre	Notes
1983
The 18 Bronze Girls of Shaolin	Chien Lai Yeh			
7 Star Grand Mantis	Sunny Chiu			
Aces Go Places 2	Eric Tsang	Samuel Hui, Karl Maka		
The Accident	Lo Bo Lun			
Ah Fei	Maan Yan			
Ah Ying	Allen Fong			
Air Disaster	Yuk Ping			
All the King's Men	King Hu	Tien Feng, Cheng Pei-pei, Lee Kwan		
All the Wrong Spies	Teddy Robin Kwan	George Lam, Teddy Robin, Brigitte Lin, Paul Chun, Brenda Lo, Tsui Hark	Comedy	
Angels and Devils				
Angry Young Man	Wong Sing Lui			
Assassin's Revenge				
Attack of the Joyful Goddess	Chang Cheh			
The Black Magic With Buddha	Lo Lieh	Chen Kuan-Tai, Candice Yu, Lo Lieh, Cho Seung Wah, Elaine Jin, Mun Yiu Wah	Horror	
Blood Money	Wong Shu Tong	Chow Yun-fat, Chan Man Ngai	Action	
Burning of Imperial Palace	Li Han-hsiang	Tony Leung Ka-fai, Liu Xiaoqing	Historical drama	
The Champions	Brandy Yuen	Yuen Biao, Moon Lee, Cheung Kwok Keung, Dick Wei	Action / Comedy	
Esprit D'amour	Ringo Lam	Alan Tam, Joyce Ngai, Cecilia Yip, Bil Tung, Tang Pik-wan	Horror	
Fantasy Mission Force	Kevin Chu	Jackie Chan, Adam Cheng, Brigitte Lin, Jimmy Wang Yu	Action / Comedy	
Fearless Hyena Part II	Lo Wei, Cheung Kuen	Jackie Chan, Dean Shek	Martial arts / Action / Comedy	
Gun Is Law	Norman Law	Philip Chan, John Shum	Crime	
Home at Hong Kong	King Hoi Lam	Andy Lau, Chu Hoi Lun, Caroll Gordon, Ku Feng	Drama	
Hong Kong Playboys	Wong Jing	Alexander Fu, Patrick Tse, Natalis Chan, Cherie Chung	Comedy / Drama / Romance	
Just for Fun	Frankie Chan	Frankie Chan, Liu Wai-hung, Sally Yeh, Wong Wan Si, Wu Ma	Comedy	
Last Affair	Tony Au	Chow Yun-fat, Carol Cheng, Pat Ha	Drama	
Little Dragon Maiden	Hua Shan	Leslie Cheung, Mary Jean Reimer, Chen Kuan-Tai, Leanne Liu	Wuxia	
Mad. Mad 83	Chor Yuen	Johnny Ngan, Elton Loo, Lucia Leung, Lee Ngo, Lee Ka Ting, Henry Lee, Wong San, Michael Miu, Stanley Fung, Albert Lo, Eddy Ko, Yu Mo Lin, Barbara Yung, Felix Wong, Tony Leung, Anita Mui, Shek Sau	Comedy	
Men from the Gutter	Lam Nai-Choi	Michael Miu, Jason Pai	Action / Drama	
On the Wrong Track	Clarence Fok	Andy Lau, Jeem Yim, Elliot Ngok, Prudence Liew, Winnie Chin	Action / Drama	
Perfect Wife?!	Dean Shek	Dean Shek, Eric Tsang, Linda Lau, Paul Chun, May Lo, Wong Ching, Raymond Wong, Lily Li, Jamie Chik	Comedy	
Play Catch	Lau Kar-wing	Alan Tam, Olivia Cheng, Eric Tsang, David Chiang	Comedy	
Project A	Jackie Chan	Jackie Chan, Sammo Hung, Yuen Biao	Martial arts / Action	
Reign Behind a Curtain	Li Han-hsiang	Tony Leung Ka-fai, Liu Xiaoqing	Historical drama	
Shaolin and Wu Tang	Gordon Liu	Gordon Liu, Adam Cheng, Idy Chan	Martial arts	
This Is Kung Fu	Chung Yee, Yeung Chung	Jet Li	Documentary	
Winners and Sinners	Sammo Hung	Sammo Hung, Jackie Chan, Yuen Biao, Richard Ng, Charlie Chin, Stanley Fung	Action / Comedy	
Zu Warriors from the Magic Mountain	Tsui Hark	Sammo Hung, Yuen Biao, Adam Cheng, Brigitte Lin		Hong Kong Film Awards
