= Hong Kong Film Award for Best Director =

Annual Chinese film award

- Awarded for: Achievement in cinematic direction
- Country: Hong Kong
- Presented by: Hong Kong Film Awards
- First award: 1982
- Currently held by: Patrick Leung (2026)

The Hong Kong Film Award for Best Director (Chinese: 香港電影金像獎最佳導演) is an award presented annually at the Hong Kong Film Awards (HKFA). It is given to honour the best director of a Hong Kong film.^{[Note 1]} The 1st Hong Kong Film Awards ceremony was held in 1982, with no formal nomination procedure established; the award was given to Allen Fong for his direction of Father and Son. After the first award ceremony, a nomination system was put in place whereby no more than five nominations are made for each category and each entry is selected through two rounds of voting. Firstly, prospective nominees are marked with a weight of 50% each from HKFA voters and a hundred professional adjudicators, contributing towards a final score with which the top five nominees advance to the second round of voting. The winner is then selected via a scoring process where 55% of the vote comes from 55 professional adjudicators, 25% from representatives of the Hong Kong Film Directors' Guild and 20% from all other HKFA Executive Committee Members.

From the 2nd Hong Kong Film Awards (1983), there are five, sometimes 6, nominations for the category of Best Director from which one director is chosen the winner of the Hong Kong Film Award for Best Director. The most recent recipient of the award was Soi Cheang, who was honoured at the 43rd Hong Kong Film Awards (2025), for his film Twilight of the Warriors: Walled In. The directors with most awards in this category is Ann Hui with six wins, followed by Allen Fong, Johnnie To, Tsui Hark and Wong Kar-wai with 3 times each.

== Winners and nominees ==
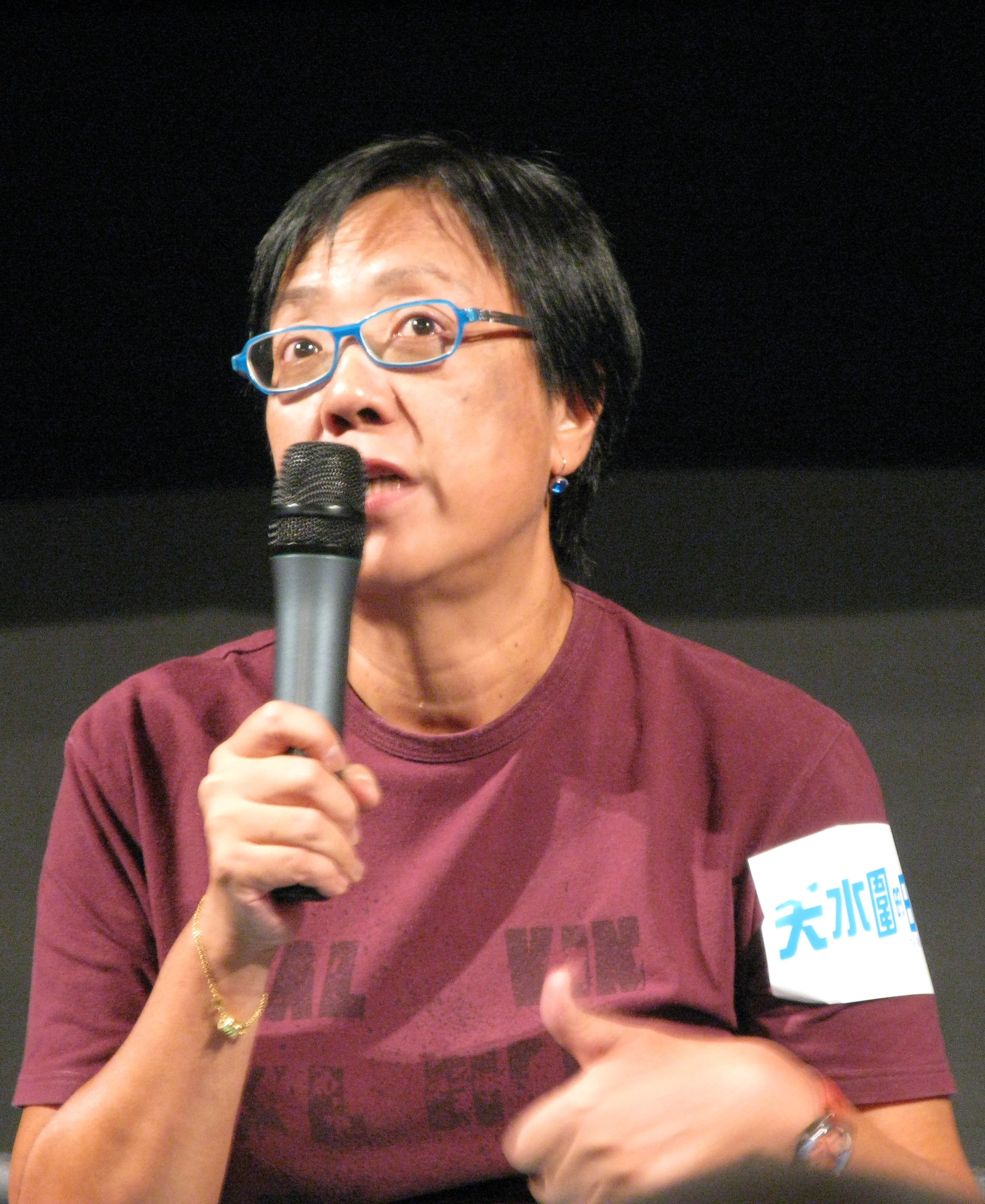
Ann Hui has won the award 6 times with 13 nominations.

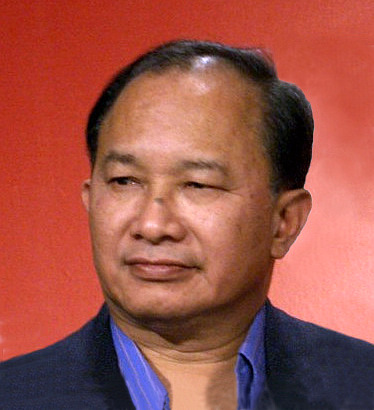
John Woo won in 1990 for The Killer.

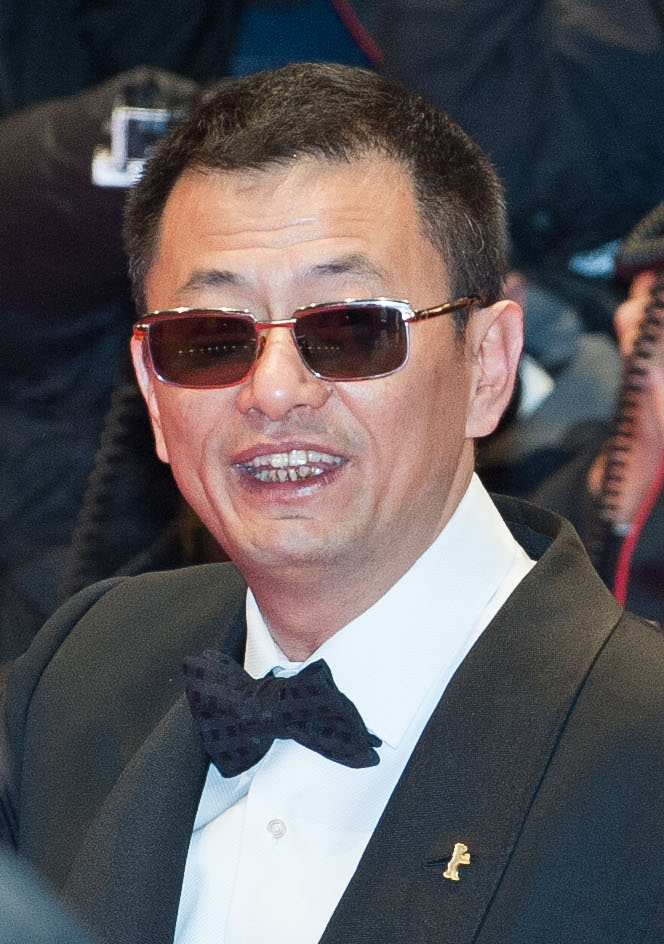
Wong Kar-wai won in 1991 for Days of Being Wild, 1995 for Chungking Express and 2014 for The Grandmaster.

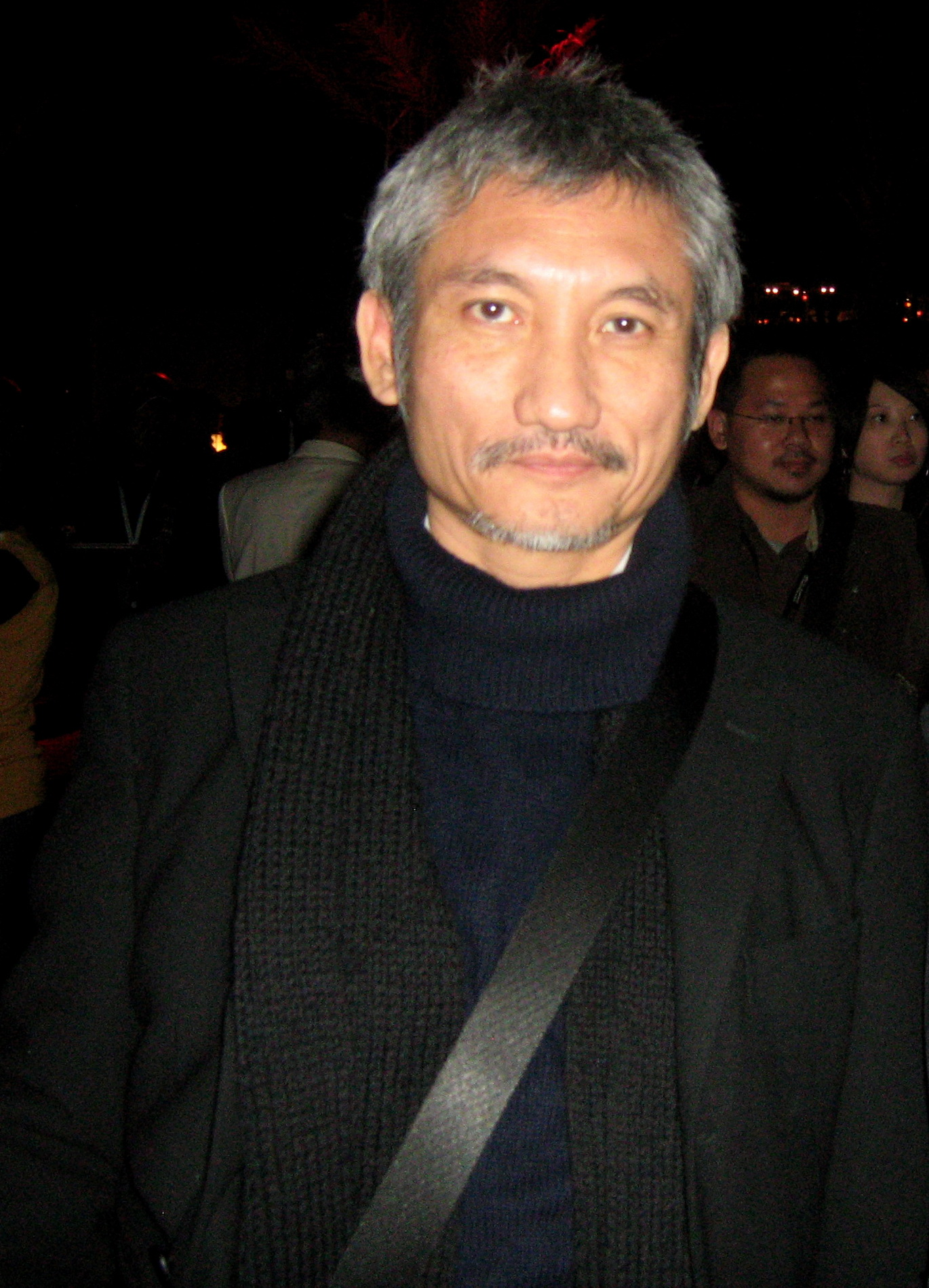
Tsui Hark won for his films Shanghai Blues, Detective Dee and the Mystery of the Phantom Flame and The Taking of Tiger Mountain.

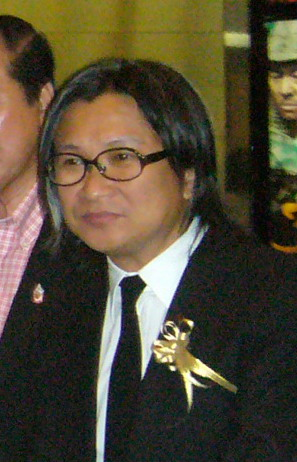
Peter Chan won in 2008 for The Warlords.

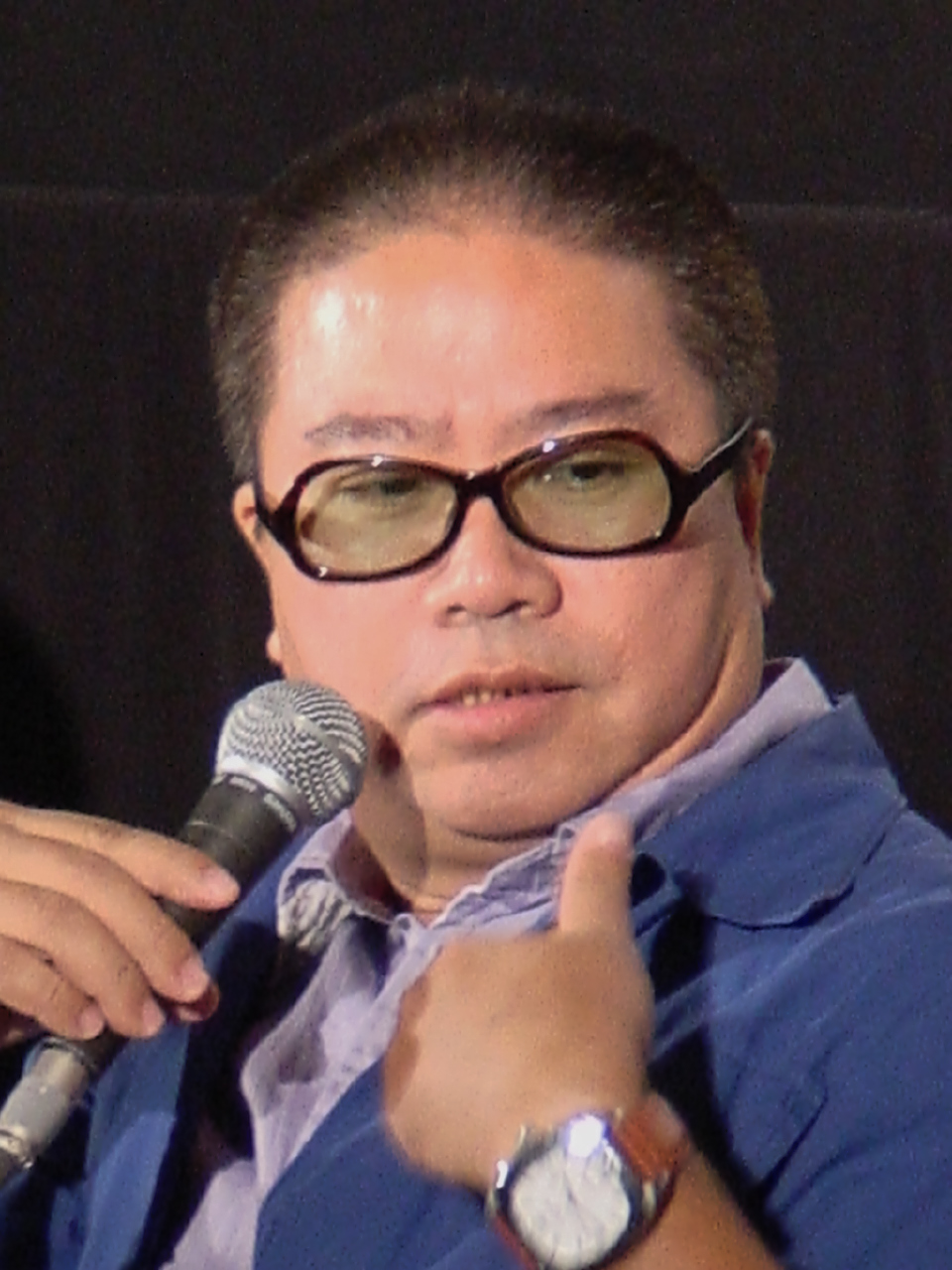
Fruit Chan won in 1998 for crime drama Made in Hong Kong.

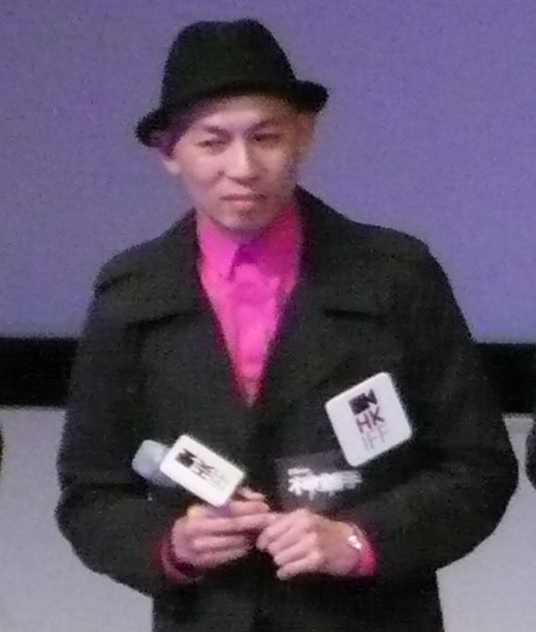
Dante Lam and Gordon Chan won jointly in 1999 for crime-drama Beast Cops.

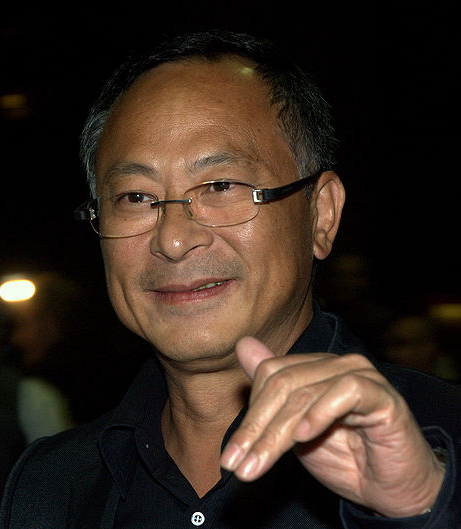
Johnnie To has won 3 times with 18 nominations.

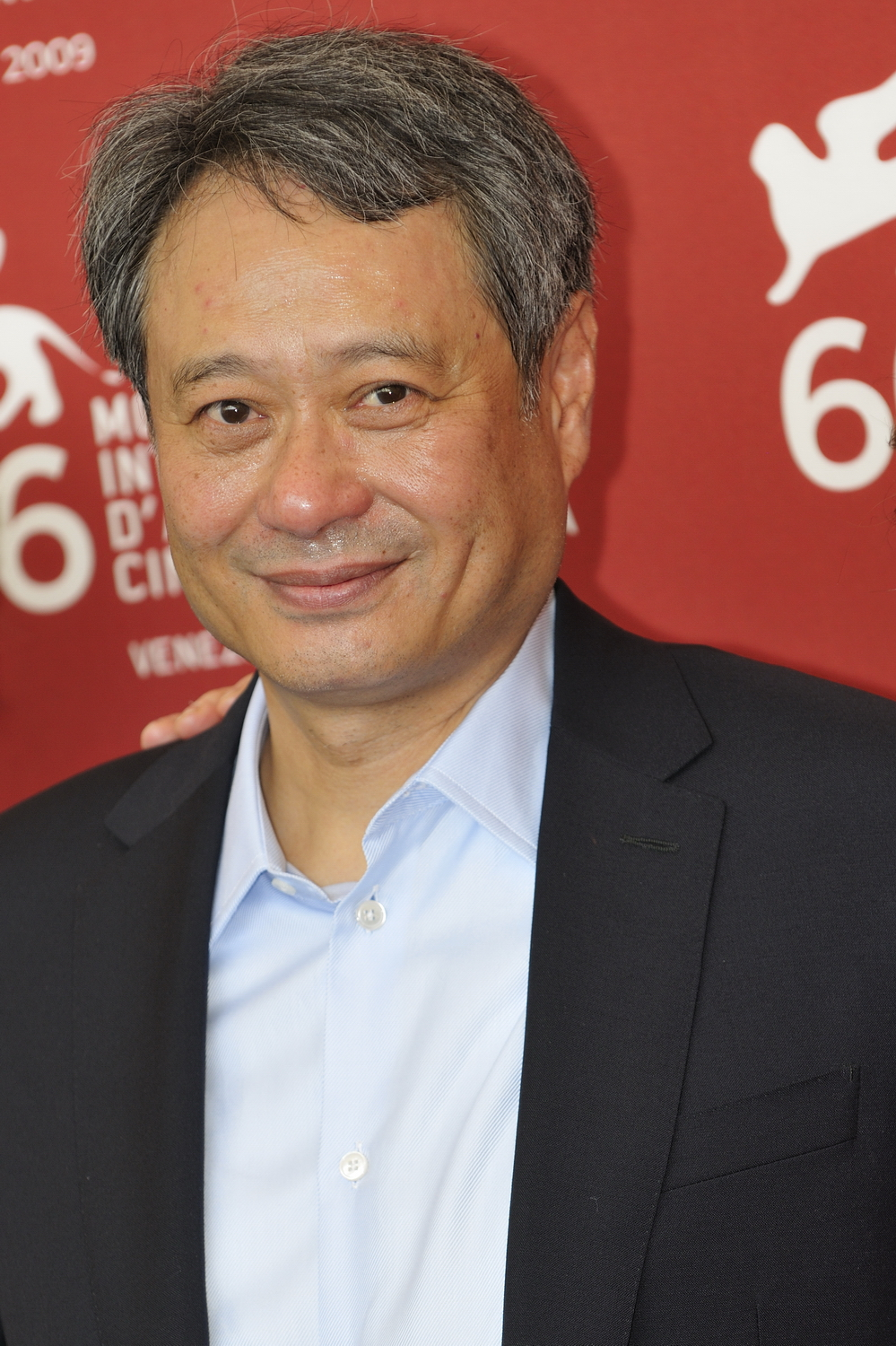
Ang Lee won in 2001 for Crouching Tiger, Hidden Dragon.

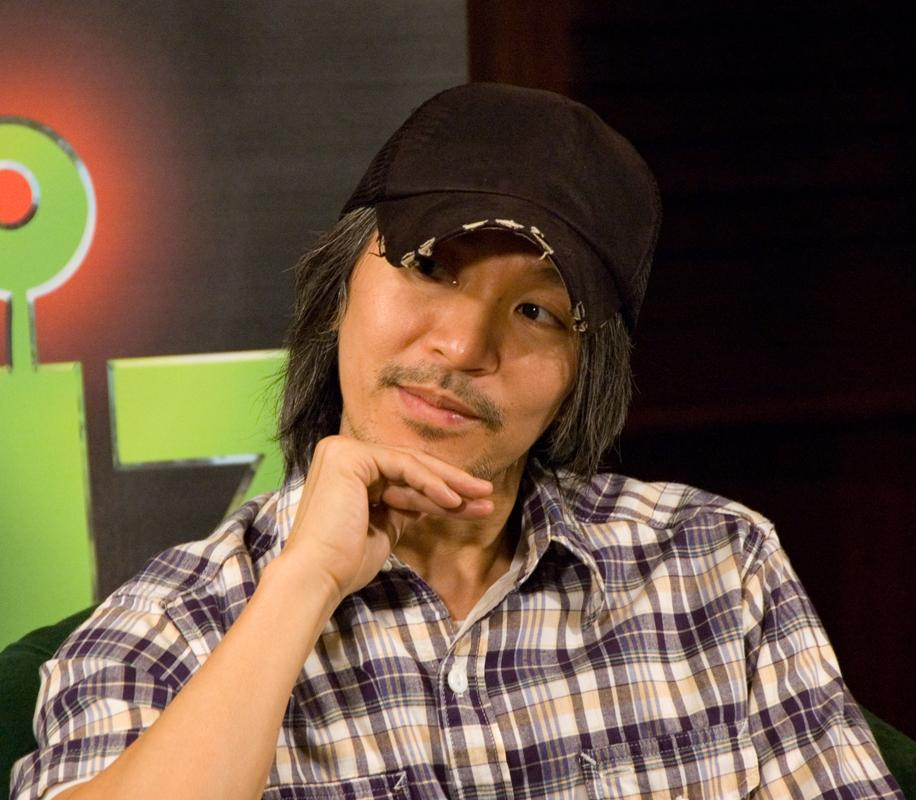
Stephen Chow won in 2002 for martial arts comedy Shaolin Soccer.

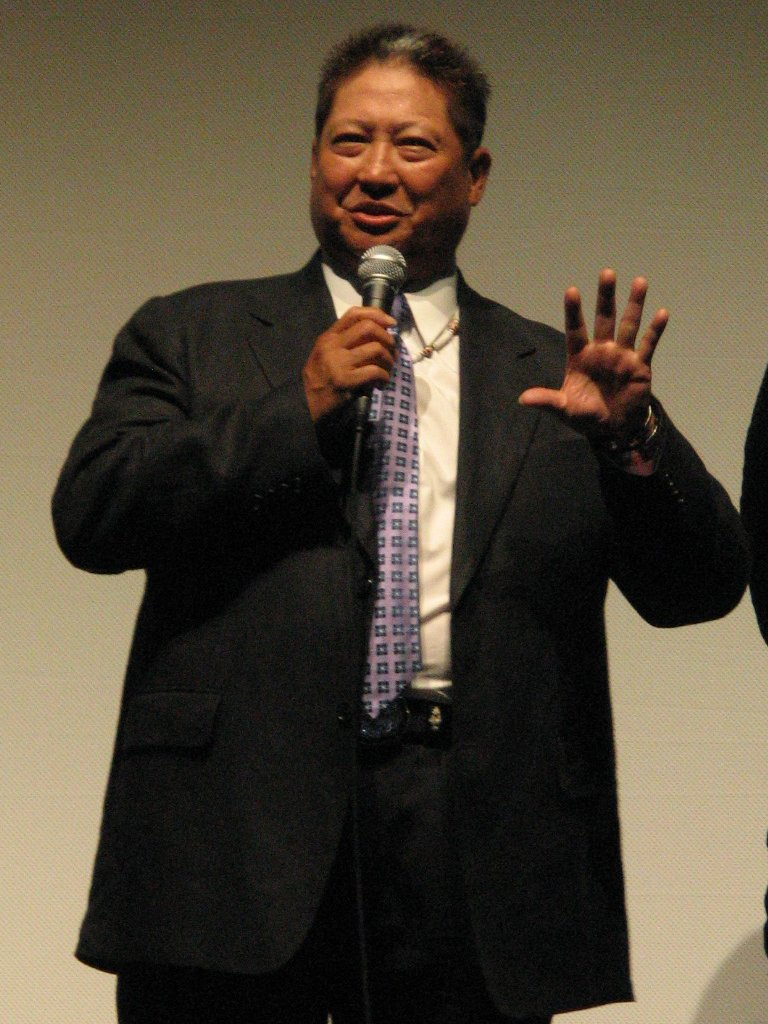
Sammo Hung received nominations for The Prodigal Son and Heart of Dragon.

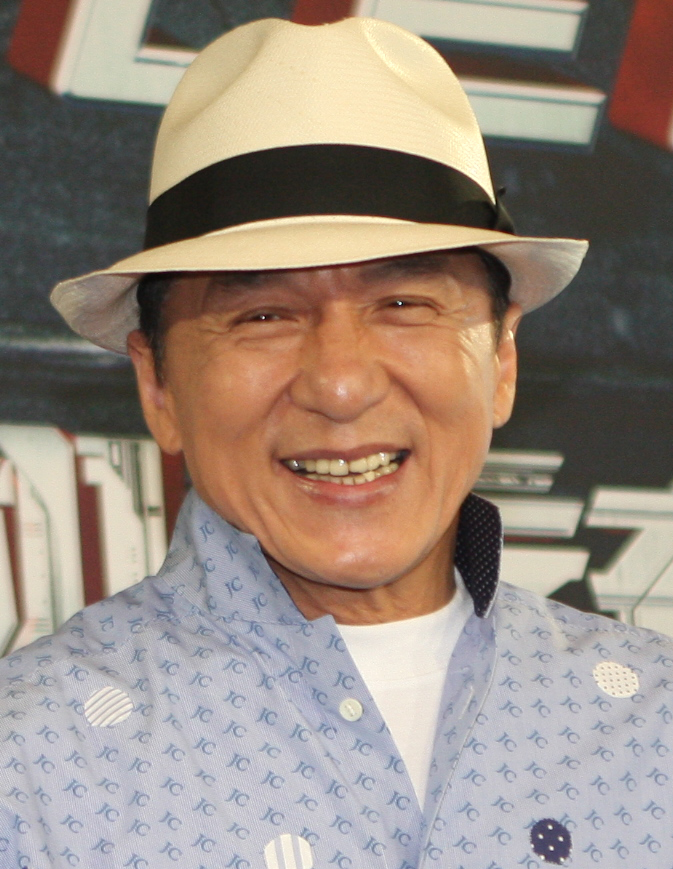
Jackie Chan was nominated in 1986 for Police Story.

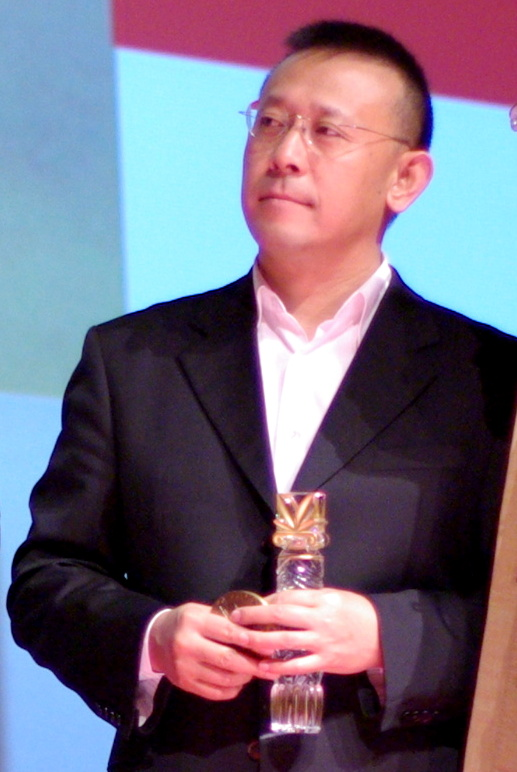
Jiang Wen was nominated in 2012 for Let the Bullets Fly.

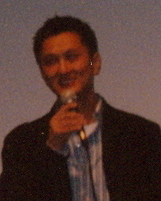
Wilson Yip was nominated six times.

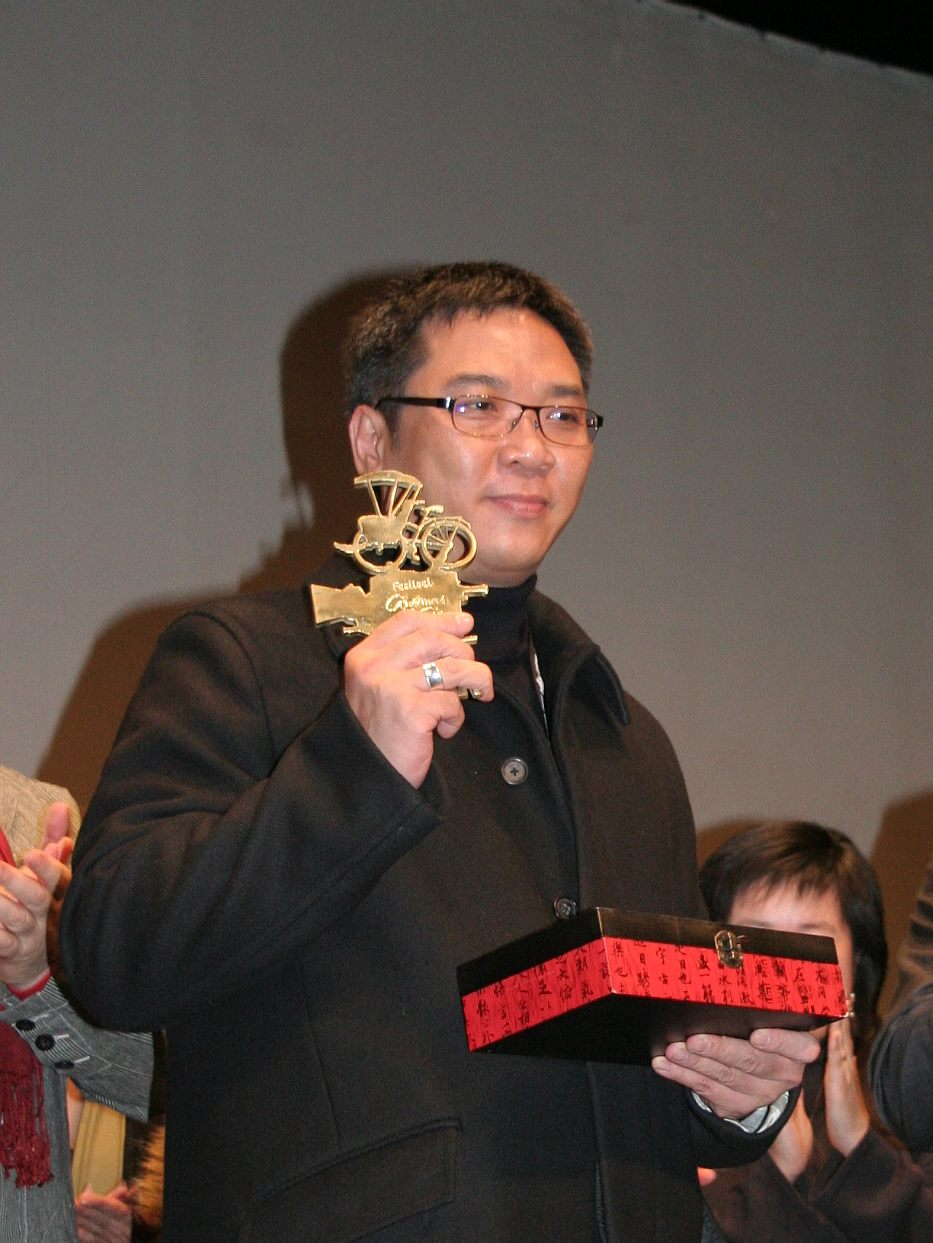
Stanley Kwan was nominated six times.

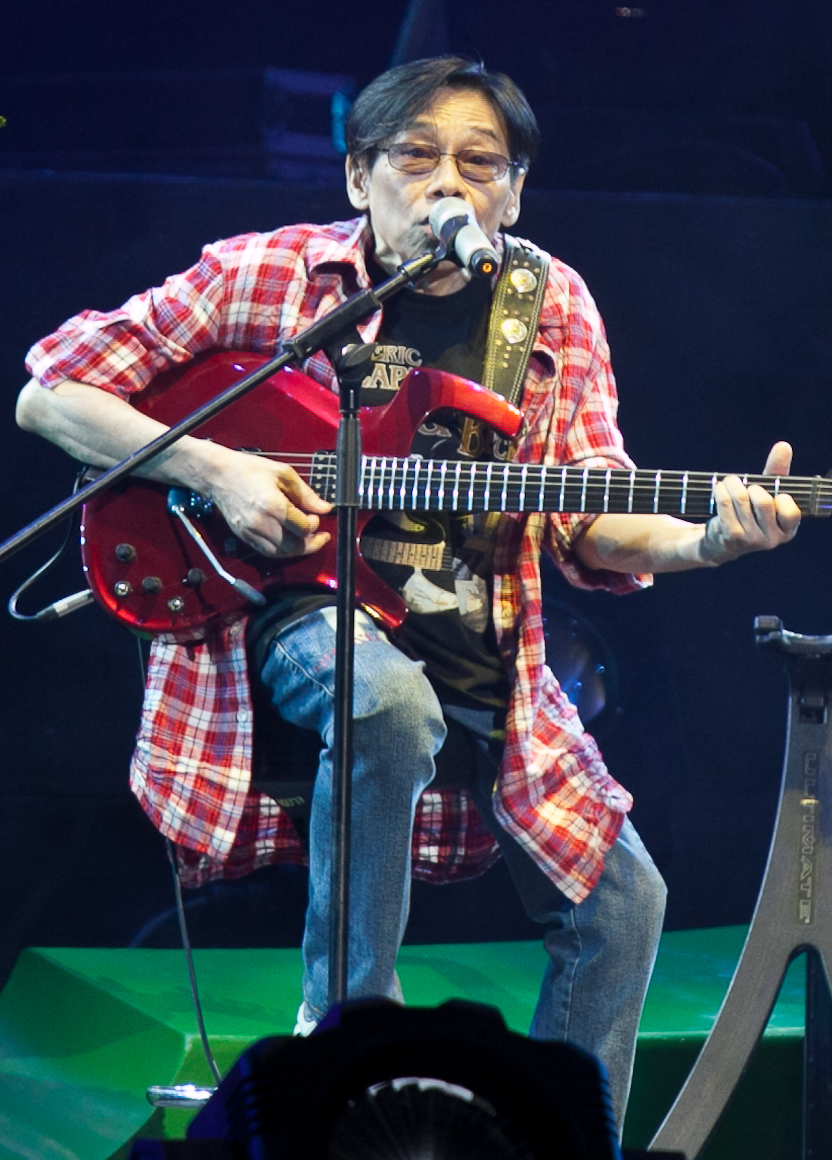
Teddy Robin was nominated once in 1984.

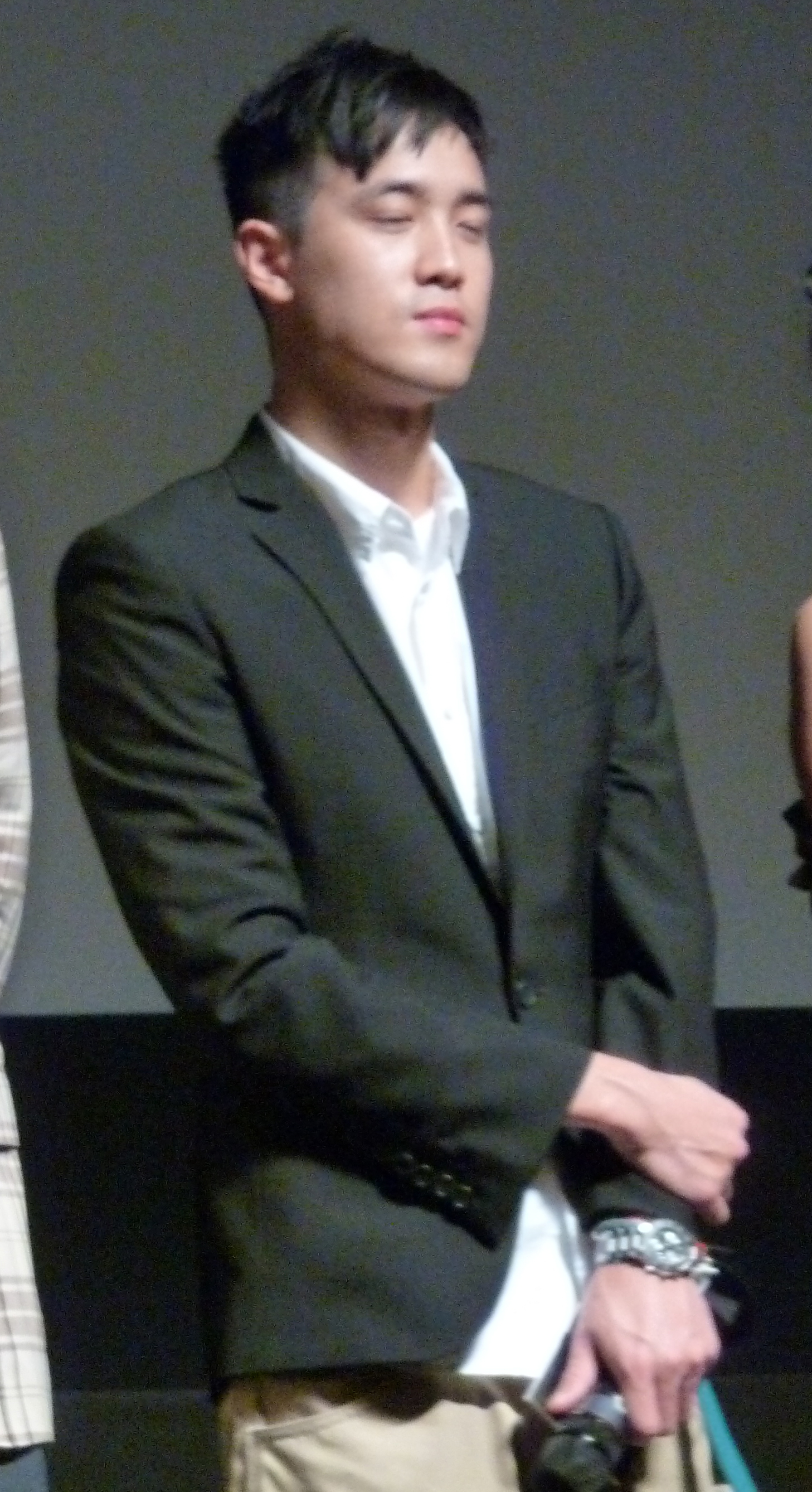
Derek Tsang won in 2020 for Better Days.

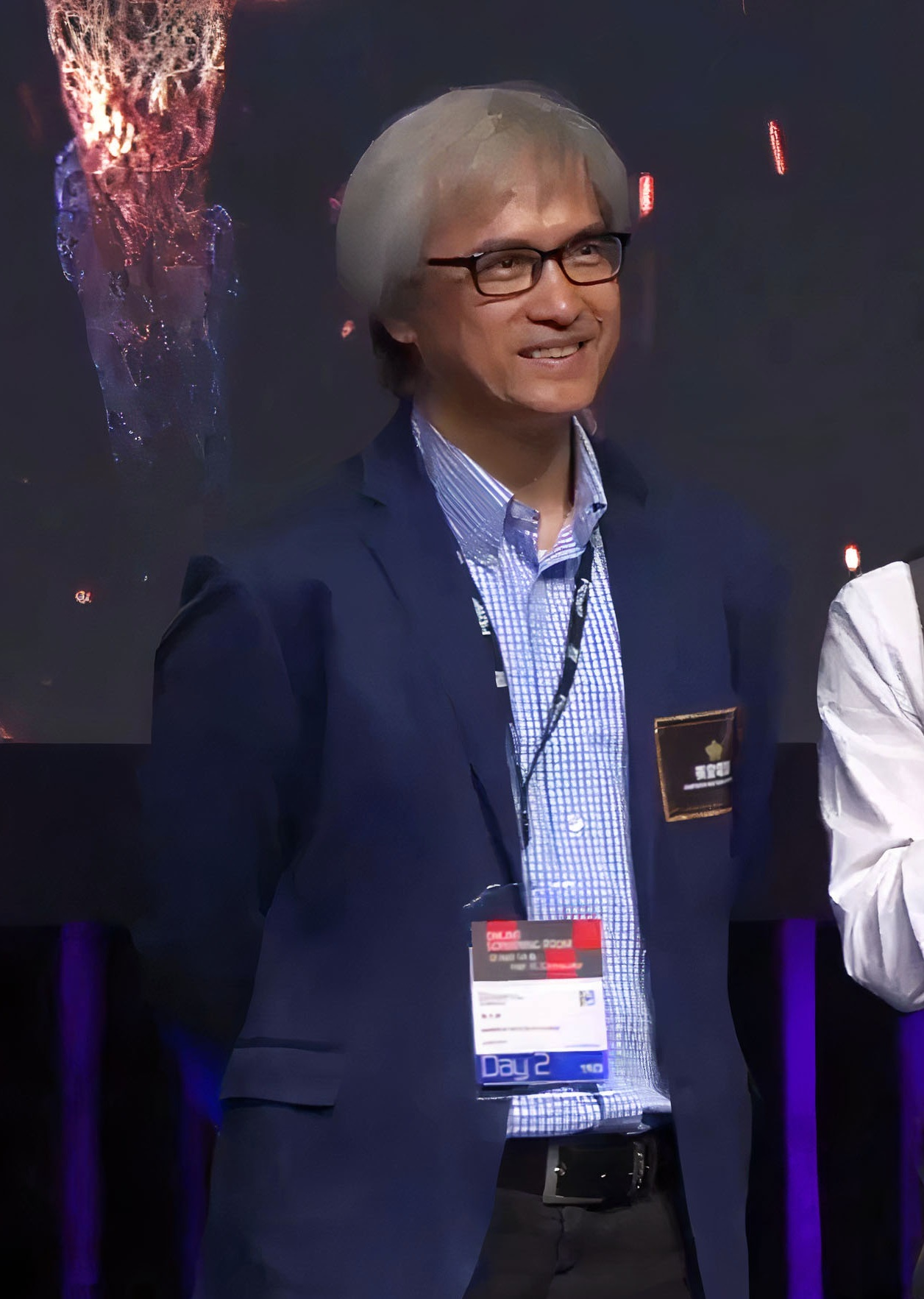
Benny Chan won in 2022 for Raging Fire.

Table key
‡	Indicates the winner

Year	Director(s)	Film	Ref.
1981 (1st)	Allen Fong	Father and Son	
1982 (2nd)	Ann Hui	Boat People	
1982 (2nd)	David Lai	Lonely Fifteen	
1982 (2nd)	Sammo Hung	The Prodigal Son	
1982 (2nd)	Clifford Choi	Teenage Dreamers	
1982 (2nd)	Patrick Tam	Nomad	
1983 (3rd)	Allen Fong	Ah Ying	
1983 (3rd)	Li Han-hsiang	The Burning of Imperial Palace	
1983 (3rd)	Wu Ma	The Dead and the Deadly	
1983 (3rd)	Teddy Robin	All the Wrong Spies	
1983 (3rd)	Kirk Wong	Health Warning	
1984 (4th)	Yim Ho	Homecoming	
1984 (4th)	Tsui Hark	Shanghai Blues	
1984 (4th)	Johnny Mak	Long Arm of the Law	
1984 (4th)	Po-Chih Leong	Hong Kong 1941	
1984 (4th)	Danny Lee Sau-Yin	Law with Two Phases	
1985 (5th)	Mabel Cheung	The Illegal Immigrant	
1985 (5th)	Stanley Kwan	Women	
1985 (5th)	Ricky Lau	Mr. Vampire	
1985 (5th)	Sammo Hung	Heart of Dragon	
1985 (5th)	Jackie Chan	Police Story	
1986 (6th)	Allen Fong	Just Like Weather	
1986 (6th)	Stephen Shin	Brotherhood	
1986 (6th)	John Woo	A Better Tomorrow	
1986 (6th)	Derek Yee	The Lunatics	
1986 (6th)	Li Han-Xiang	The Last Emperor	
1986 (6th)	Stanley Kwan	Love Unto Waste	
1987 (7th)	Ringo Lam	City on Fire	
1987 (7th)	Ching Siu-tung	A Chinese Ghost Story	
1987 (7th)	Mabel Cheung	An Autumn's Tale	
1987 (7th)	Ringo Lam	Prison on Fire	
1987 (7th)	Ann Hui	The Romance of Book & Sword	
1987 (7th)	Patrick Tam	Final Victory	
1988 (8th)	Stanley Kwan	Rouge	
1988 (8th)	Lawrence Ah Mon	Gangs	
1988 (8th)	Alex Law	Painted Faces	
1988 (8th)	Wong Kar-wai	As Tears Go By	
1988 (8th)	Jacob Cheung	Last Eunuch in China	
1989 (9th)	John Woo	The Killer	
1989 (9th)	Johnnie To	All About Ah-Long	
1989 (9th)	Jacob Cheung	Beyond the Sunset	
1989 (9th)	Anthony Chan Yau	A Fishy Story	
1989 (9th)	Mabel Cheung	Eight Taels of Gold	
1990 (10th)	Wong Kar-wai	Days of Being Wild	
1990 (10th)	John Woo	Bullet in the Head	
1990 (10th)	Ann Hui	Song of the Exile	
1990 (10th)	Yim Ho	Red Dust	
1990 (10th)	Clara Law	Farewell China	
1991 (11th)	Tsui Hark	Once Upon a Time in China	
1991 (11th)	John Woo	Once a Thief	
1991 (11th)	Gordon Chan	Fight Back to School	
1991 (11th)	Lawrence Ah Mon	Lee Rock	
1991 (11th)	Poon Man-kit	To Be Number One	
1992 (12th)	Jacob Cheung	Cageman	
1992 (12th)	Jeffrey Lau	92 Legendary La Rose Noire	
1992 (12th)	Gordon Chan	King of Beggars	
1992 (12th)	Tsui Hark	Once Upon a Time in China II	
1992 (12th)	Stanley Kwan	Center Stage	
1993 (13th)	Derek Yee	C'est la vie, mon chéri	
1993 (13th)	Kirk Wong	Crime Story	
1993 (13th)	Cha Yuen-yee	Legal Innocence	
1993 (13th)	Peter Chan and Lee Chi-ngai	Tom, Dick and Hairy	
1993 (13th)	Clara Law	Temptation of a Monk	
1994 (14th)	Wong Kar-wai	Chungking Express	
1994 (14th)	Wong Kar-wai	Ashes of Time	
1994 (14th)	Peter Chan	He's a Woman, She's a Man	
1994 (14th)	Tsui Hark	The Lovers	
1994 (14th)	Gordon Chan	The Final Option	
1995 (15th)	Ann Hui	Summer Snow	
1995 (15th)	Derek Yee	Full Throttle	
1995 (15th)	Wong Kar-wai	Fallen Angels	
1995 (15th)	Yim Ho	The Day the Sun Turned Cold	
1995 (15th)	Johnnie To	Loving You	
1996 (16th)	Peter Chan	Comrades: Almost a Love Story	
1996 (16th)	Derek Chiu	The Log	
1996 (16th)	Derek Yee and Law Chi-leung	Viva Erotica	
1996 (16th)	Shu Kei	Hu-Du-Men	
1996 (16th)	Benny Chan	Big Bullet	
1997 (17th)	Fruit Chan	Made in Hong Kong	
1997 (17th)	Wong Kar-wai	Happy Together	
1997 (17th)	Ringo Lam	Full Alert	
1997 (17th)	Mabel Cheung	The Soong Sisters	
1997 (17th)	Johnnie To	Lifeline	
1998 (18th)	Gordon Chan and Dante Lam	Beast Cops	
1998 (18th)	Stanley Kwan	Hold You Tight	
1998 (18th)	Fruit Chan	The Longest Summer	
1998 (18th)	Mabel Cheung	City of Glass	
1998 (18th)	Patrick Yau	The Longest Nite	
1999 (19th)	Johnnie To	The Mission	
1999 (19th)	Sylvia Chang	Tempting Heart	
1999 (19th)	Ann Hui	Ordinary Heroes	
1999 (19th)	Ringo Lam	Victim	
1999 (19th)	Johnnie To	Running Out of Time	
2000 (20th)	Ang Lee	Crouching Tiger, Hidden Dragon	
2000 (20th)	Wong Kar-wai	In the Mood for Love	
2000 (20th)	Fruit Chan	Durian Durian	
2000 (20th)	Johnnie To and Wai Ka-fai	Needing You...	
2000 (20th)	Wilson Yip	Juliet in Love	
2001 (21st)	Stephen Chow	Shaolin Soccer	
2001 (21st)	Ann Hui	July Rhapsody	
2001 (21st)	Stanley Kwan	Lan Yu	
2001 (21st)	Johnnie To and Wai Ka-fai	Love on a Diet	
2001 (21st)	Ann Hui	Visible Secret	
2002 (22nd)	Andrew Lau and Alan Mak	Infernal Affairs	
2002 (22nd)	Law Chi-Leung	Inner Senses	
2002 (22nd)	Peter Chan	Three: Going Home	
2002 (22nd)	Fruit Chan	Hollywood Hong Kong	
2002 (22nd)	Zhang Yimou	Hero	
2003 (23rd)	Johnnie To	PTU	
2003 (23rd)	Johnnie To and Wai Ka-fai	Running on Karma	
2003 (23rd)	Derek Yee	Lost in Time	
2003 (23rd)	Andrew Lau and Alan Mak	Infernal Affairs II	
2003 (23rd)	Benny Chan Muk-Sing	Heroic Duo	
2004 (24th)	Derek Yee	One Nite in Mongkok	
2004 (24th)	Wong Kar-wai	2046	
2004 (24th)	Stephen Chow	Kung Fu Hustle	
2004 (24th)	Benny Chan Muk-Sing	New Police Story	
2004 (24th)	Johnnie To	Breaking News	
2005 (25th)	Johnnie To	Election	
2005 (25th)	Derek Yee	2 Young	
2005 (25th)	Andrew Lau and Alan Mak	Initial D	
2005 (25th)	Peter Chan	Perhaps Love	
2005 (25th)	Tsui Hark	Seven Swords	
2006 (26th)	Patrick Tam	After This Our Exile	
2006 (26th)	Jacob Cheung	A Battle of Wits	
2006 (26th)	Johnnie To	Election 2	
2006 (26th)	Johnnie To	Exiled	
2006 (26th)	Zhang Yimou	Curse of the Golden Flower	
2007 (27th)	Peter Chan	The Warlords	
2007 (27th)	Ann Hui	The Postmodern Life of My Aunt	
2007 (27th)	Yau Nai-Hoi	Eye in the Sky	
2007 (27th)	Johnnie To and Wai Ka-fai	Mad Detective	
2007 (27th)	Derek Yee	Protégé	
2008 (28th)	Ann Hui	The Way We Are	
2008 (28th)	Benny Chan	Connected	
2008 (28th)	John Woo	Red Cliff	
2008 (28th)	Johnnie To	Sparrow	
2008 (28th)	Wilson Yip	Ip Man	
2009 (29th)	Teddy Chan	Bodyguards and Assassins	
2009 (29th)	Ann Hui	Night and Fog	
2009 (29th)	John Woo	Red Cliff II	
2009 (29th)	Derek Yee	Shinjuku Incident	
2009 (29th)	Alan Mak and Felix Chong	Overheard	
2010 (30th)	Tsui Hark	Detective Dee and the Mystery of the Phantom Flame	
2010 (30th)	Derek Kwok and Clement Cheng	Gallants	
2010 (30th)	Wilson Yip	Ip Man 2	
2010 (30th)	Su Chao-pin	Reign of Assassins	
2010 (30th)	Dante Lam	The Stool Pigeon	
2011 (31st)	Ann Hui	A Simple Life	
2011 (31st)	Johnnie To	Life without Principle	
2011 (31st)	Tsui Hark	Flying Swords of Dragon Gate	
2011 (31st)	Alan Mak and Felix Chong	Overheard 2	
2011 (31st)	Jiang Wen	Let the Bullets Fly	
2012 (32nd)	Longman Leung and Sunny Luk	Cold War	
2012 (32nd)	Soi Cheang	Motorway	
2012 (32nd)	Pang Ho-cheung	Love in the Buff	
2012 (32nd)	Lo Chi Leung	The Bullet Vanishes	
2012 (32nd)	Dante Lam	The Viral Factor	
2013 (33rd)	Wong Kar Wai	The Grandmaster	
2013 (33rd)	Johnnie To	Drug War	
2013 (33rd)	Benny Chan	The White Storm	
2013 (33rd)	Derek Kwok	As the Light Goes Out	
2013 (33rd)	Dante Lam	Unbeatable	
2014 (34th)	Ann Hui	The Golden Era	
2014 (34th)	Fruit Chan	The Midnight After	
2014 (34th)	Peter Chan	Dearest	
2014 (34th)	Dante Lam	That Demon Within	
2014 (34th)	Alan Mak and Felix Chong	Overheard 3	
2015 (35th)	Tsui Hark	The Taking Of Tiger Mountain	
2015 (35th)	Adrian Kwan	Little Big Master	
2015 (35th)	Derek Yee	I Am Somebody	
2015 (35th)	Wilson Yip	Ip Man 3	
2015 (35th)	Philip Yung Tsz Kwong	Port of Call	
2016 (36th)	Frank Hui, Jevons Au and Vicky Wong	Trivisa	
2016 (36th)	Wong Chun	Mad World	
2016 (36th)	Derek Tsang	Soul Mate	
2016 (36th)	Johnnie To	Three	
2016 (36th)	Stephen Chow	The Mermaid	
2017 (37th)	Ann Hui	Our Time Will Come	
2017 (37th)	Kearen Pang	29+1	
2017 (37th)	Herman Yau	Shock Wave	
2017 (37th)	Sylvia Chang	Love Education	
2017 (37th)	Wilson Yip	Paradox	
2018 (38th)	Felix Chong	Project Gutenberg	
2018 (38th)	Fruit Chan	Three Husbands	
2018 (38th)	Dante Lam	Operation Red Sea	
2018 (38th)	Sunny Chan	Men On The Dragon	
2018 (38th)	Oliver Chan	Still Human	
2019 (39th)	Derek Tsang	Better Days	
2019 (39th)	Kiwi Chow	Beyond the Dream	
2019 (39th)	Ray Yeung	Suk Suk	
2019 (39th)	Heiward Mak	Fagara	
2019 (39th)	Wilson Yip	Ip Man 4: The Finale	
2020 and 2021 (40th)	Benny Chan	Raging Fire	
2020 and 2021 (40th)	Peter Chan	Leap	
2020 and 2021 (40th)	Soi Cheang	Limbo	
2020 and 2021 (40th)	Longman Leung	Anita	
2020 and 2021 (40th)	Man Lim-chung	Keep Rolling	
2022 (41st)	Wai Ka-fai	Detective vs Sleuths	
2022 (41st)	Ho Cheuk-tin	The Sparring Partner	
2022 (41st)	Lam Sum	The Narrow Road	
2022 (41st)	Mabel Cheung and William Kwok	To My Nineteen Year Old Self	
2022 (41st)	Sunny Chan	Table for Six	
2023 (42nd)	Soi Cheang	Mad Fate	
2023 (42nd)	Nick Cheuk	Time Still Turns the Pages	
2023 (42nd)	Felix Chong	The Goldfinger	
2023 (42nd)	Jack Ng	A Guilty Conscience	
2023 (42nd)	Lawrence Kan	In Broad Daylight	
2024 (43rd)	Soi Cheang	Twilight of the Warriors: Walled In	
2024 (43rd)	Philip Yung and Au Cheuk-man	Papa	
2024 (43rd)	Adam Wong	The Way We Talk	
2024 (43rd)	Anselm Chan	The Last Dance	
2024 (43rd)	Ray Yeung	All Shall Be Well	
2025 (44th)	Patrick Leung	Ciao UFO	
2025 (44th)	Shu Qi	Girl	
2025 (44th)	Tommy Ng	Another World	
2025 (44th)	Jonathan Li, Chow Man-yu	Behind the Shadows	
2025 (44th)	Peter Chan	She's Got No Name	

== Multiple wins and nominations ==
The following individuals received two or more Best Director awards:

Wins	Director	Years
6	Ann Hui	1982, 1997, 2008, 2011, 2014, 2017
3	Allen Fong	1981, 1983, 1986
3	Johnnie To	1999, 2003, 2005
3	Tsui Hark	1991, 2010, 2015
3	Wong Kar-wai	1990, 1994, 2013
2	Derek Yee	1993, 2004
2	Peter Chan	1996, 2007
2	Soi Cheang	2023, 2024

The following individuals received three or more Best Director nominations:

Nominations	Director
18	Johnnie To
13	Ann Hui
10	Derek Yee
9	Peter Chan
9	Wong Kar-wai
8	Tsui Hark
6	Alan Mak
6	Benny Chan
6	Dante Lam
6	Fruit Chan
6	John Woo
6	Mabel Cheung
6	Stanley Kwan
6	Wilson Yip
5	Felix Chong
5	Wai Ka-Fai
4	Gordon Chan
4	Jacob Cheung
4	Ringo Lam
4	Soi Cheang
3	Allen Fong
3	Andrew Lau
3	Patrick Tam
3	Stephen Chow
3	Yim Ho

== Records ==
Items	Name	Statistics	Notes
Most wins	Ann Hui	6 wins	13 nominations
Most nominations	Johnnie To	18 nominations	3 wins
Oldest winner	Ann Hui	Age 70 years, 327 days	For Our Time Will Come
Oldest nominee	Mabel Cheung	Age 72 years, 150 days	For To My Nineteen-Year-Old Self
Youngest winner	Stanley Kwan	Age 31 years, 182 days	For Rouge
Youngest nominee	Stanley Kwan	Age 31 years	For Rouge
Most nominations without a win	Wilson Yip	6 nominations	

== See also ==
- Hong Kong Film Award
- Hong Kong Film Award for Best Actor
- Hong Kong Film Award for Best Actress
- Hong Kong Film Award for Best Supporting Actor
- Hong Kong Film Award for Best Supporting Actress
- Hong Kong Film Award for Best Action Choreography
- Hong Kong Film Award for Best Cinematography
- Hong Kong Film Award for Best Film
- Hong Kong Film Award for Best New Performer

== Notes ==
A film is considered to be a "Hong Kong film" by meeting at least 2 of the following criteria:

1. The film's director is a Hong Kong resident that holds a Hong Kong Identity Card
2. At least one of the film's production companies are legally registered in Hong Kong SAR.
3. At least one person involved in the film's production from any six separate award categories who are Hong Kong resident holding a Hong Kong Identity Card.
