= 7th Hong Kong Film Awards =

1988 Hong Kong awards ceremony

- Date: 10 April 1988
- Hosted by: Lydia Shum and Paul Chung

The 7th Hong Kong Film Awards ceremony, honored the best films of 1987 and took place on 10 April 1988 at Hong Kong Academy for Performing Arts, Wan Chai, Hong Kong. The ceremony was hosted by Lydia Shum and Paul Chung, during the ceremony awards are presented in 14 categories. The ceremony was sponsored by City Entertainment Magazine.

== Awards ==
Winners are listed first, highlighted in boldface, and indicated with a double dagger (‡).

**Best Film**: **Dickson Poon and John Shum — An Autumn's Tale**‡; Buddha's Lock; City on Fire; Final Victory; The Romance of Book and Sword; A Chinese Ghost Story	**Best Director**: **Ringo Lam — City on Fire**‡; Ringo Lam — Prison on Fire; Tony Ching — A Chinese Ghost Story; Mabel Cheung — An Autumn's Tale; Patrick Tam — Final Victory; Ann Hui — The Romance of Book and Sword
**Best Actor**: **Chow Yun Fat — City on Fire**‡; Yun-Fat Chow — An Autumn's Tale; Yun-Fat Chow — Prison on Fire; Leslie Cheung — A Better Tomorrow II; Danny Lee — City on Fire; Eric Tsang — Final Victory; Shichang Da — The Romance of Book and Sword	**Best Actress**: **Josephine Siao — The Wrong Couples**‡; Carol Cheng — Wonder Women; Cherie Chung — An Autumn's Tale; Loletta Lee — Final Victory; Margaret Lee Final Victory; Joey Wong — A Chinese Ghost Story
**Best Supporting Actor**: **Tony Leung — People's Hero**‡; Wu Ma — A Chinese Ghost Story; William Ho — Prison on Fire; Hark Tsui — Final Victory; Ronald Wong — People's Hero; Roy Cheung — Prison on Fire	**Best Supporting Actress**: **Elaine Jin — People's Hero**‡; Deannie Yip — Spiritual Love; Carrie Ng — City on Fire; Joyce Godenzi — Eastern Condors
**Best New Performer**: **Ben Lam — Long Arm of the Law: Part 2**‡; Tommy Wong — Prison on Fire; Ling Yeung — No Regret; Nadia Chan — Porky's Meatball; Ha Chi-chun — Eastern Condors	**Best Screenplay**: **Alex Law — An Autumn's Tale**‡; Wong Kar-wai — Final Victory; Shum Sai-Sing — City on Fire; Yin Nam — Prison on Fire; Kwok-Leung Gan — Shen qi liang xia nu
**Best Cinematography**: **James Hayman and David Chung — An Autumn's Tale**‡; Hang-Sang Poon, Ka Ko Lee, Moon-Tong Lau and Wing-Hang Wong — A Chinese Ghost Story; Bill Wong — The Romance of Book and Sword; Peter Pau — The Legend of Wisely; Ardy Lam — Final Victory	**Best Film Editing**: **Kwok Kuen Cheung — Final Victory**‡; Mok Leung Chau — The Romance of Book and Sword; Peter Cheung — Project A Part II; Ming Lam Wong — City on Fire; SNS Group — A Chinese Ghost Story
**Best Art Direction**: **Chung Man Yee — A Chinese Ghost Story**‡; Patrick Tam — Final Victory; Chi Fung Lok — City on Fire; Pak-Suen Kwan — No Regret; Kwan Ho, Yim Po Wong, Mui Chiu, Wah-Sang Leung and Lai Pan — The Romance of Book and Sword	**Best Action Choreography**: **Jackie Chan's Stuntman Association — Project A Part II**‡; Jackie Chan's Stuntman Association, Lau Kar-Wing and Danny Yuen Ching-Yeung — Armour of God; Sammo Hung's Stuntman Association — Eastern Condors; Tsui Siu-Ming — Mirage; Tony Ching — A Better Tomorrow II; Tony Ching, Philip Kwok, Alan Chui Chung-San, Lau Chi-Ho and Wu Chi-Lung — A Chinese Ghost Story
**Best Original Film Score**: **Lok Man Tai, James Wong — A Chinese Ghost Story**‡; Teddy Robin — City on Fire; Lowell Lo — Prison on Fire; Lowell Lo — An Autumn's Tale; Danny Chung — Final Victory	**Best Original Film Song**: **Composer/Lyrics: James Wong** **• Singer: Sally Yeh — A Chinese Ghost Story**‡; Composer: Donald Ashley • Lyrics: Lam Chun-Keung • Singer: Sam Hui — Legend of Wu; Composer: Lowell Lo Koon-Ting • Lyrics: Cheung Koon-Nam • Singer: Maria Cordero — Prison on Fire; Composer: Teddy Robin • Lyrics: Teddy Robin and Lam Man-Ting • Singer: Maria Cordero — City on Fire; Composer/Lyrics/Singer: James Wong — A Chinese Ghost Story; Composer/Lyrics: James Wong • Singer: Leslie Cheung — A Chinese Ghost Story
