= 1st Hong Kong Film Awards =

1982 Hong Kong Film Awards

- Official poster
- Date: 9 March 1982
- Site: Hong Kong Arts Centre Shouson Theatre
- Hosted by: Eric Ng and Zhan Xiaoping

The 1st Hong Kong Awards ceremony, honoured the best films of 1981 and took place on 9 March 1982, at the Hong Kong Arts Centre Shouson Theatre in Wan Chai, Hong Kong. The ceremony was hosted by Eric Ng and Zhan Xiaoping, during the ceremony awards are presented in 5 categories. The ceremony was sponsored by RTHK and City Entertainment Magazine.

== Awards ==
Winners are listed first, highlighted in boldface, and indicated with a double dagger (‡). (Note: The 1st Hong Kong Film Awards had no nominees, only winners .)

**Best Film**: **Father and Son – Wong Kai-chuen, producer**‡	**Best Director**: **Allen Fong – Father and Son**‡
**Best Screenplay**: **Alfred Cheung – The Story of Woo Viet**‡; **Best Actor**: **Michael Hui – Security Unlimited**‡	**Best Actress**: **Kara Wai – My Young Auntie**‡

Winners in 1982

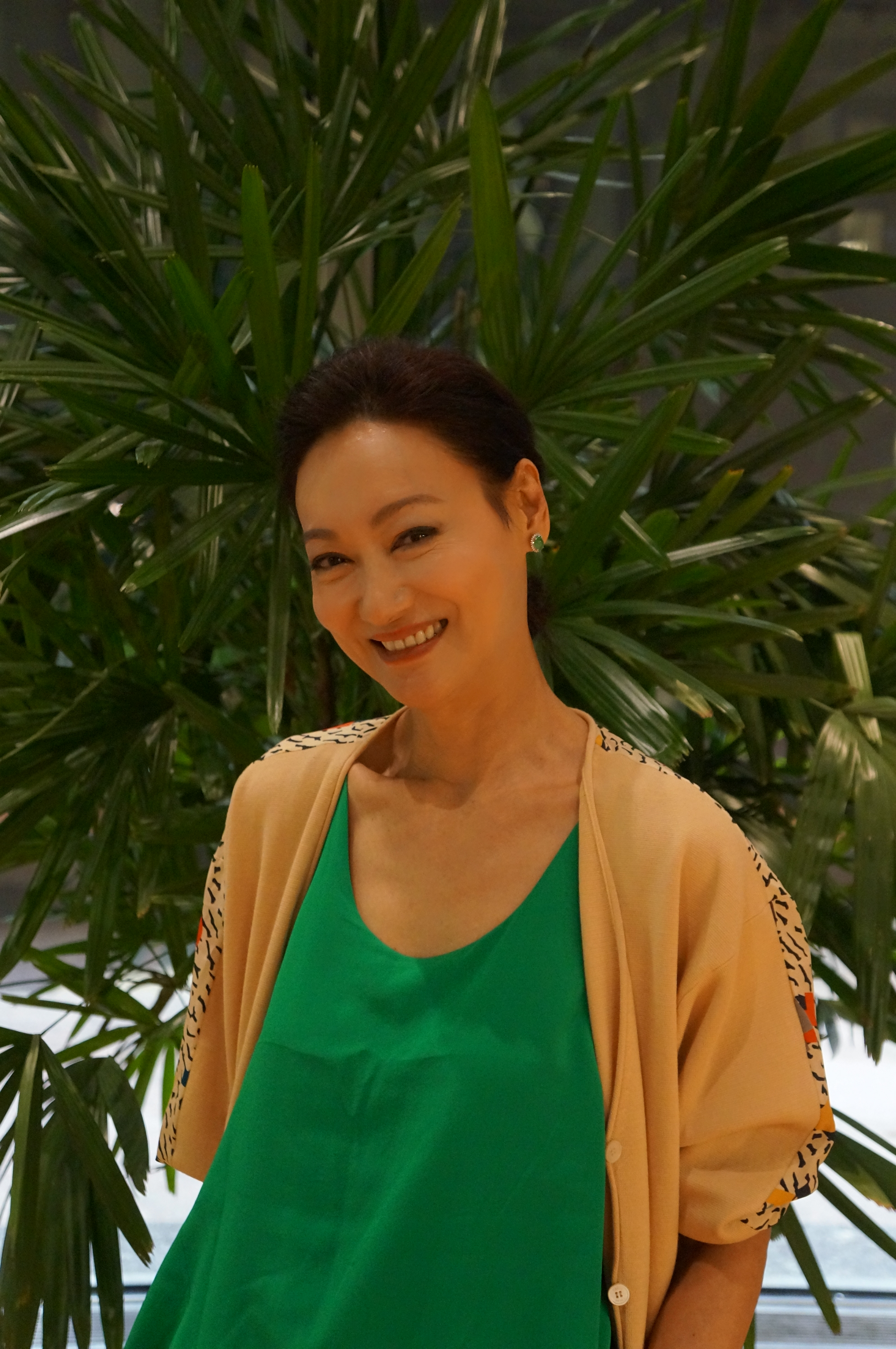
Kara Wai, Best Actress winner

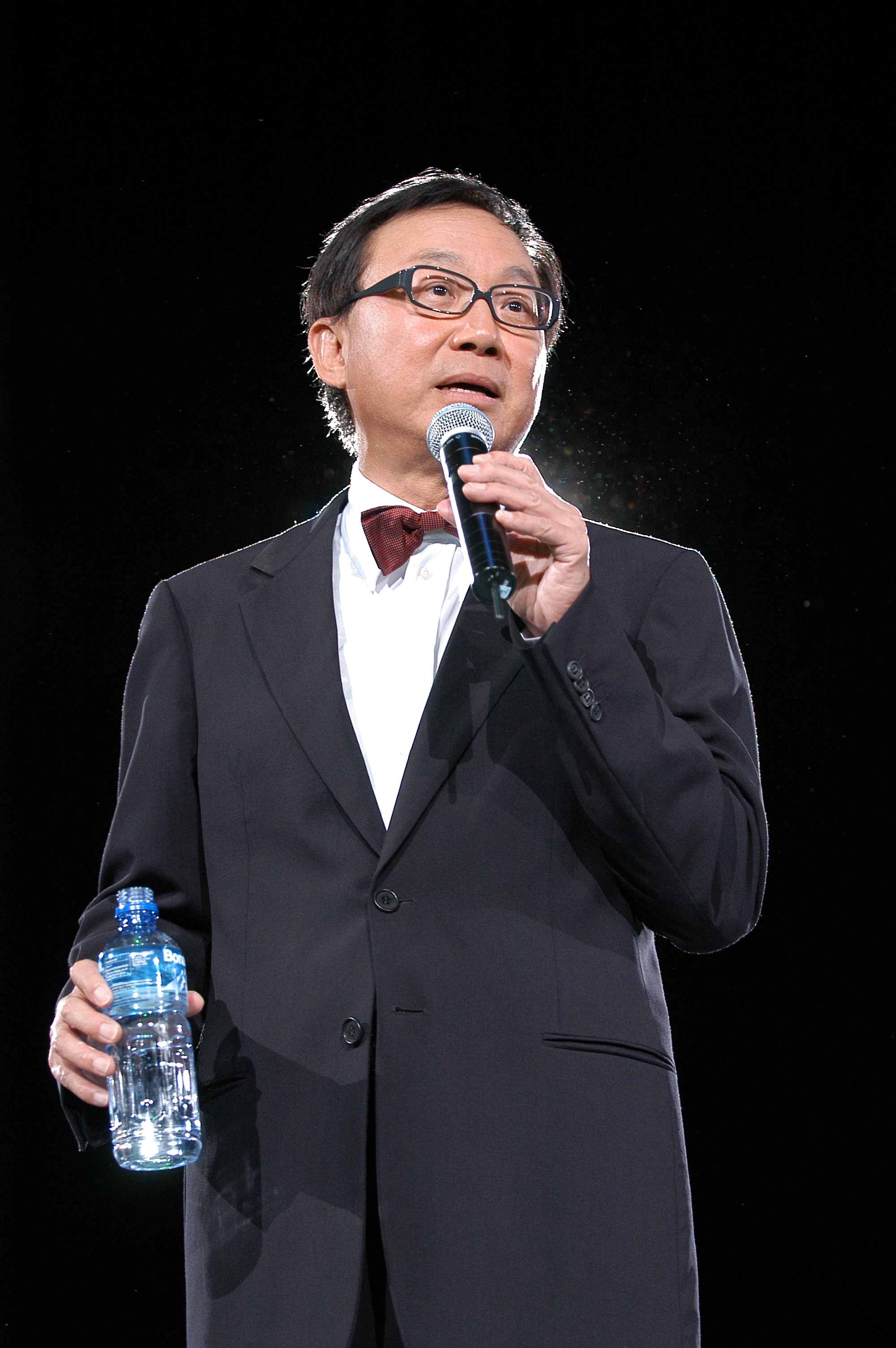
Michael Hui, Best Actor winner
