= A Little Life-Opera =

1998 Hong Kong film by Allen Fong

- Film poster
- Traditional Chinese: 一生一台戲
- Simplified Chinese: 一生一台戏
- Directed by: Allen Fong
- Written by: Chan Kin Chung; Chen Chi-zhe
- Produced by: Ann Hui; Stephen Lam; Wang Lijun; Yao Wentai
- Starring: Yang Kuei-Mei; Winston Chao
- Cinematography: Mai-Quan
- Edited by: Cheng Chi-Hung; Guo Qiang; Kwok Keung; Li Yu-Huai
- Music by: Violet Lam
- Production companies: Fujian Film Studio; Great Root Ltd.
- Release date: 1998
- Running time: 103 minutes
- Countries: Hong Kong; China
- Language: Mandarin

A Little Life-Opera (Chinese: 一生一台戲) is a 1998 Hong Kong film directed by Allen Fong. The film, set in Fujian province, was filmed in the People's Republic of China and stars Yang Kuei-Mei and Winston Chao.

The dialogs of the film are entirely in Hokkien (Min Nan) and Mandarin. It is Fong's last feature film as he has not made any more feature movies since.

== Synopsis ==
Xueyan (雪雁, played by Yang Kuei-Mei) is a 40-something single mother who lives in the coastal region of Fujian province. She has a daughter in her late teens and is part of a part-time Min opera troupe from the village. When she is invited to perform with her troupe members for a show, she comes across Sanpeng (三朋, Winston Chao), a former troupe actor who is now a businessman. Meanwhile, the troupe struggles to survive as modernity and Western habits clash with the traditional performance art.

== Cast ==
- Yang Kuei-Mei
- Winston Chao
