= Keith Kwan =

Hong Kong actor

- 關朝聰
- Born: 1959; British Hong Kong
- Died: 19 September 1995 (aged 35–36); Vancouver, Canada
- Education: True Light Middle School of Hong Kong
- Occupation: Actor

Keith Kwan Chiu-chung (Chinese: 關朝聰, 1959 - 19 September 1995), nicknamed "Gwai Chai" (鬼仔), was a Hong Kong actor. He joined TVB in 1984 and became an artist under the company. He was known as a program host on the Pearl Channel and occasionally participated in TVB guest appearances in movies and TV series, hosting and showbiz, etc. Later, in the early 1990s, Kwan Chiu-chung moved to Canada until he died of cancer caused by AIDS in Vancouver, Canada on September 19, 1995. He was 36 years old.

== Biography ==
=== Summary ===
In 1959, Kwan was born in British Hong Kong. His father was from Kaiping, Guangdong, China and his mother was Scottish. When he was a child, he studied at True Light Middle School of Hong Kong (Second Primary School Kindergarten, graduated in 1965), he moved to Canada with his family at the age of 8 to continue his studies there. He has performed in dramas, stage plays and filmed commercials in the United States and Canada. After graduating from university, he returned to Hong Kong and became a member of the Hong Kong Performing Arts Troupe. He also worked as a director at Hong Kong Radio. In 1984, Kwan joined TVB under the introduction of artist Deborah Moore, Kwan co-hosted a variety show on the English channel Pearl Channel with Deborah Moore in the mid-1980s, his performance attracted the attention of the audience, and he was later invited to participate in a TV series on the Cantonese channel Jade Channel, and occasionally made guest appearances in movies and TV.

=== Death ===
Kwan withdrew from stage performances after 1991. He was diagnosed with human immunodeficiency virus and needed to stay in a Canadian hospital for long-term treatment. Soon the cancer cells spread, and the disease lasted for four years. On September 19, 1995, Kwan died of complications from AIDS at St. Paul's Hospital (Vancouver) in downtown Vancouver, British Columbia, Canada, at the age of 36. He was the first artist who died by AIDS in Hong Kong.

== Filmography ==
=== TV series ===
Year	Title	Role	Notes/Ref.
1987	The Torn Between	YoYo (Bar singer)	
1988	Withered in the Wind	Tong Sau-chai	
1988	Fate Cast In The Wind	So Ha-mai	
1989	Yanky Boy	Stephen Ho Sheung-ka	
1989	War of the Dragon		
1990	When the Sun Shines	Man Fook-chuen	
1990	The Challenge of Life	Pierre	
