= Final Victory =

1987 Hong Kong film by Patrick Tam

- Film poster
- Traditional Chinese: 最後勝利
- Simplified Chinese: 最后胜利
- Hanyu Pinyin: Zuì Hòu Shèng Lì
- Jyutping: Zeoi3 Hau6 Sing3 Lei6
- Directed by: Patrick Tam
- Screenplay by: Wong Kar-wai
- Story by: Wong Kar-wai
- Produced by: John Shum
- Starring: Eric Tsang; Loletta Lee; Margaret Lee; Tsui Hark
- Cinematography: Ardy Lam
- Edited by: Cheung Kwok-kuen
- Music by: Chris Babida; Danny Chung; Danny Chan; Tang Siu-lam
- Production company: D&B Films
- Distributed by: Fortune Star Media
- Release date: 12 March 1987
- Running time: 108 minutes
- Country: Hong Kong
- Language: Cantonese
- Box office: HK$5.8 million

Final Victory (Chinese: 最後勝利) is a 1987 Hong Kong action film directed by Patrick Tam and starring Eric Tsang, Loletta Lee, Margaret Lee and Tsui Hark.

== Plot ==
Triad leader Big Bo is a violent man, but his younger brother Hung is a "good guy" with a light personality who fusses around him. Even once Hung's girlfriend was taken, his brother stood up for him.

Bo committed a crime and was sentenced to prison for six months. Before he went to prison, Bo entrusted Hung to take care of his two lovers Ping and Mimi. Hung becomes involved in a dispute between Ping and loan sharks. Later Hung and Ping also rushes to Japan and look for Mimi, who is also in a sticky situation herself. Hung beats his brain out to help them get out of trouble, while also preventing them from finding out each other's identity. After the three return to Hong Kong, Ping and Mimi discovers each other's identity as Bo's mistress. Ping cries but was restrained by Bo. While waiting for Bo's release, Hung and Mimi fall in love, but because of this, he cannot face his brother, which becomes a burden that he cannot resolve.

== Cast ==
- Eric Tsang as Hung
- Loletta Lee as Mimi
- Margaret Lee as Ping
- Tsui Hark as Big Bo
- Kam Lui as Big Bo's friend at karaoke lounge
- Dennis Chan as Manager of mahjong den
- Michelle Sze-ma as Hung's girlfriend
- Patrick Gamble as Filipino lover of Hung's girlfriend
- Johnny Koo as Man watching porn videos in Japan
- Wong Hung as Loanshark Choi
- Wong Ying-hung
- Wong Wai-kwong
- Cheung Kwok-ban
- Yung Chung-yan
- Cheung Yuen-ling
- Wong Sin-tung
- Chan Ging as Thug at Bar

== Box office ==
The film grossed HK$5,795,427 at the Hong Kong box office during its theatrical run from 12 to 25 March 1987 in Hong Kong.

== Awards and nominations ==
Awards and nominations
Ceremony	Category	Recipient	Outcome
7th Hong Kong Film Awards'	Best Director	Patrick Tam	Nominated
7th Hong Kong Film Awards'	Best Screenplay	Wong Kar-wai	Nominated
7th Hong Kong Film Awards'	Best Actor	Eric Tsang	Nominated
7th Hong Kong Film Awards'	Best Actress	Loletta Lee	Nominated
7th Hong Kong Film Awards'	Best Actress	Margaret Lee	Nominated
7th Hong Kong Film Awards'	Best Supporting Actor	Tsui Hark	Nominated
7th Hong Kong Film Awards'	Best Cinematography	Ardy Lam	Nominated
7th Hong Kong Film Awards'	Best Film Editing	Cheung Kwok-kuen	Won
7th Hong Kong Film Awards'	Best Art Direction	Patrick Tam	Nominated
7th Hong Kong Film Awards'	Best Original Film Score	Danny Chung	Nominated
