= Shanghai Blues =

1984 Hong Kong film by Tsui Hark

- Original film poster
- Chinese: 上海之夜
- Literal meaning: The Shanghai Night
Transcriptions
Standard Mandarin
- Hanyu Pinyin: Shànghǎi Zhīyè
Yue: Cantonese
- Jyutping: Soeng^{6}hoi^{2} Zi^{1}je^{6}
- Directed by: Tsui Hark
- Written by: Chan Koon-chung; Szeto Cheuk-hon; Raymond To
- Produced by: Tsui Hark
- Starring: Kenny Bee; Sylvia Chang; Sally Yeh; Tin Cing; Loletta Lee
- Cinematography: Peter Ngor Chi-kwan; Lin Tsan-ting; Chang Hui-kung
- Edited by: Chow Siu-lam; Ng Kam-wah
- Music by: Wong Jim
- Production company: Film Workshop
- Distributed by: Film Workshop
- Release date: 11 October 1984 (HK)
- Running time: 100 minutes
- Country: Hong Kong
- Languages: Cantonese; Shanghainese
- Box office: $13,377

Shanghai Blues (Chinese: 上海之夜; lit. 'The Shanghai Night') is a 1984 Hong Kong period romantic comedy directed and produced by Tsui Hark, and starring Kenny Bee, Sylvia Chang, Sally Yeh, and Loletta Lee. The score was composed by James Wong Jim.

This was the first film that Hark produced under his new company, Film Workshop. It was nominated in eight categories at the 4th Hong Kong Film Awards, including for Best Film, Best Director, and Best Actress (for Sylvia Chang).

== Plot ==
Tung Kwok-man and "Uncle Twenty" are both clowns at a Shanghai night club, and after the outbreak of the Second Sino-Japanese War, Kwok-man is seized by patriotic zeal, and prepares to join the army. As the Japanese fighter planes attack Shanghai, Kwok-man meets a young girl named Shu-shu, while they are sheltering together from the bombs under Suzhou Bridge and they fall in love, promising each other to meet at Suzhou Bridge after the war.

Ten years pass, and Kwok-man returns to Shanghai to look for Shu-shu, but only meets several vagrant veterans. At this time Shu-shu has become a taxi dancer at a nightclub. One day she runs into "Stool", a scatterbrained girl who is new in town and has had all her money stolen, and she lets Stool live in her room, not realising that their upstairs neighbour is Kwok-man. One day, Shu-shu's teenage maid at the club is molested by a pervert and Shu-shu herself is beaten for helping her and in the farcical chaos, she is bundled on stage and sings in an impromptu number, which attracts a plutocrat's attention. This man wants to marry her, but Shu-shu haughtily refuses him.

Stool takes part in a beauty contest to be the city's "Calendar Queen" quite by chance, thinking that she is going to be interviewed for the position of kindergarten teacher. Accidentally, she is chosen as the winner by the wealthy old lady who sponsors the contest, because Stool looks plainer than the rest and she does not want her husband to seduce the new "Calendar Queen". At the same time, "Shanghai Blues", a song composed by Kwok-man, is chosen by a famous singer Chow Siu-sin, and suddenly becomes a smash hit with the Shanghai people. One day it rains very heavily, Kwok-man and Shu-shu share an umbrella, they return to Kwok-man's home together, but are encountered by Stool, who is in love with Kwok-man unrequitedly. Another day, Kwok-man saves Shu-shu when she is annoyed by some ruffians.

Kwok-man and Uncle later find a job as street performers to advertise a new gift shop. One day when he is performing, Shu-shu happens to come out of this shop where a besotted sugar daddy has been buying her and other young women gifts and demanding kisses in return. Kwok-man and Shu-shu's eyes meet; they have a strange moment in which they realise there is a bond between them. Shu-shu wants to meet Kwok-man, but she hurts her leg when she jumps out of a car. Stool appears at Calendar Queen party, a rich man fuddles her, so the boss can rape her. But the wealthy old lady drinks the wine mixed with magic potions by mistake and faints on the bed in the boss's room. The drunken Stool falls to the ground, escaped from rape. A power failure occurs that night, the boss mistakes the old lady for Stool, and it ends with a farce. In the same night, Kwok-man and Shu-shu finally recognize each other.

When Shu-shu realize that Stool also love Kwok-man, she decides to leave Shanghai. At the last moment, Kwok-man catches up with the train, to be together with Shu-shu again. Stool, walking away feeling sad about Kwok-man and Shu-shu's departures, meets a young woman who appears to resemble Stool.

== Cast ==
- Kenny Bee as Tung Kwok-man
- Sylvia Chang as Shu-shu
- Sally Yeh as "Stool"
- Tin Ching as "Uncle Twenty"
- Loretta Lee as "Chicken Fung," the maid
- Helen Ma as Chow Siu-sin
- Shing Fui-On as "Dummy"
- Manfred Wong as Gangster
- Fung Ging-man as Bald Man
- Fung Woo as Mr. Mo
- Patrick Lung as Big Boss
- Huang Man as Chairman Yu
- Fung Hak-on as Ma
- Ken Boyle as Rude Foreigner
- Tsui Hark as Pedestrian

== Reception ==
Andrew Saroch of Far East Films wrote, "'Shanghai Blues' is, overall, superior entertainment, but by the time the end credits roll it's hard not to think of what might have been."

The film was selected as one of the Top 10 Chinese films of 1984 at Hong Kong International Film Festival.

=== Awards and nominations ===
Ceremony	Category	Nominee(s)	Result
4th Hong Kong Film Awards	Best Film	Tsui Hark	Nominated
4th Hong Kong Film Awards	Best Director	Tsui Hark	Nominated
4th Hong Kong Film Awards	Best Actress	Sylvia Chang	Nominated
4th Hong Kong Film Awards	Best Supporting Actress	Loletta Lee	Nominated
4th Hong Kong Film Awards	Best New Performer	Loletta Lee	Nominated
4th Hong Kong Film Awards	Best Editing	Chow Siu-lam, Ng Kam-wah	Nominated
4th Hong Kong Film Awards	Best Art Direction	Au-Yeung Hing-yee	Nominated
4th Hong Kong Film Awards	Best Original Film Score	James Wong Jim	Nominated
4th Hong Kong Film Awards	Best Original Film Song	"Shanghai Blues"; James Wong Jim (composer and lyricist), Sally Yeh (singer)	Nominated
1985 Nantes Three Continents Festival	Montgolfiere d'or	Tsui Hark	Nominated
1985 Nantes Three Continents Festival	Special Jury Award	Tsui Hark	Won

== Restoration ==
As part of celebrating the 40th anniversary of the film it was announced a 4K restoration of Shanghai Blues would screen in the Cannes Classics section of the 77th Cannes Film Festival.

Film Movement announced a 4K re-release supervised by director Tsui from the original negative with restroation by L’Immagine Ritrovata. A theatrical and physical release is planned.
