= Father and Son (1981 film) =

1981 Hong Kong film by Allen Fong

- Film poster
- Directed by: Allen Fong
- Written by: Chan Chiu; Lilian Lee; Alfred Cheung
- Produced by: Wong Kai-chuen
- Starring: Shi Lei; Chu Hung; Yung Wai-man; David Lo; Ching Hor-wai; Cheung Yu-Ngot
- Cinematography: Bill Wong; Ho Wai-boon; Chung Yung; Wan Kwai; Lai Yat-keung
- Edited by: John Chow
- Music by: Yue Lun
- Production company: Phoenix Motion Picture Company
- Distributed by: Mei Ah Entertainment
- Release date: April 16, 1981
- Running time: 92 minutes
- Country: British Hong Kong
- Language: Cantonese
- Box office: HK$1.48 million

Father and Son (父子情) is a 1981 Hong Kong drama film directed by Allen Fong. It won the Best Film Award at the 1st Hong Kong Film Awards.

== Plot ==
The story is about a not well-educated father with low-income job who wishes his son can become an important and successful person. However, his son cannot understand his father's wishes and often is in trouble and got expelled from school. Despite his son's failure in school, the father is determined that he should get a good education so he marries his oldest daughter off to a rich man to ensure that his son's can study abroad and the college fee being paid.

== Cast ==
- Shi Lei as Law San Muk
- Chu Hung as Mrs Law (as Hung Chu)
- Yung Wai-Man as Law Family Younger Brother
- Cheung Yu-Ngor as Law Kar-Hing
- Yun Sin-Mei as Law Kar-Hei

== Awards ==
1st Hong Kong Film Awards

- Won: Best Film
- Won: Best Director - Allen Fong
