= Ah Ying =

1983 Hong Kong film by Allen Fong

- Film poster
- Directed by: Allen Fong
- Written by: Sze Yeung-Ping; Peter Wang
- Starring: Chi-Hung Chang; Pui Hui; So-ying Hui; Kei Shu
- Cinematography: Chan Lok-Yee
- Edited by: Ng Kam-Wah; John Chow Cheung-Gan; Kwok Keung
- Music by: Violet Lam
- Production company: Feng Huang Motion Picture Company
- Release date: 10 December 1983 (Hong Kong)
- Running time: 110 minutes
- Country: Hong Kong
- Language: Cantonese

Ah Ying (Chinese: 半邊人; pinyin: Bànbiānrén; lit. 'Widow') is a 1983 Hong Kong drama film directed by Allen Fong. It stars Chi-Hung Chang, Pui Hui, So-ying Hui, and Kei Shu. It won the Best Film Award at the 3rd Hong Kong Film Awards. It was also entered into the 34th Berlin International Film Festival.

== Cast ==
- Chi-Hung Chang
- Pui Hui
- So-ying Hui
- Kei Shu

== Awards ==
3rd Hong Kong Film Awards

- Won: Best Film
- Won: Best Director - Allen Fong
