= Paul Chung =

Hong Kong actor (1959–1989)

- Born: David Chan (陳鎮文); 5 April 1959; Hong Kong
- Died: 1 September 1989 (aged 30); Hong Kong
- Occupations: Actor; MC; DJ (early 1980s)
- Years active: 1978–1989

Chinese name
- Traditional Chinese: 鍾保羅
- Simplified Chinese: 钟保罗
Transcriptions
Standard Mandarin
- Hanyu Pinyin: Zhōng Bǎoluó
Yue: Cantonese
- Jyutping: Zung Bou Lo

Paul Chung Po Lo (5 April 1959 – 1 September 1989) was a Hong Kong actor, MC (Master of Ceremonies) and a DJ in the early 1980s. He committed suicide on 1 September 1989.

== Biography ==
Paul Chung was originally a host in Commercial Radio and was part of a 13 member DJ group, including Brenda Lo, Winnie Yu and Suzie Wong (TV host), so-called "6 pair-half". In 1981, he had a dispute with Commercial radio, and joined Asia Television (ATV/RTV) where he was cast in several TV dramas. He became popular when he costarred with Danny Chan and Leslie Cheung in two films.

Chung joined TVB in 1985, hosting a number of TV shows such as Miss Hong Kong Pageant and Enjoy Yourself Tonight (EYT). He was praised by media as "the best host of Miss Hong Kong".

He committed suicide on 1 September 1989 in his home of Shatin City One. It was reported that he had amassed large gambling debts prior to his death.

== Filmography ==
=== Film ===
Year	Film's Name	Character	Director	Starring
1980	《Encore (1980 film)》	Paul		Danny Chan, Leslie Cheung, Mary Jean Reimer Lau
1980	《The Beasts》	Louis		Patricia Chong, Kent Cheng
1981	《On Trial (1981 film)》	Paul	Clarence Fok	Danny Chan, Leslie Cheung
1985	《Carry On Doctors and Nurses》	Paul Lo	Anthony Chan (actor)	Anthony Chan (actor), Lawrence Cheng, Keith Kwan, Alfred Cheung, Sandy Lamb, Amy Chan

=== Drama (RTV / ATV) ===
Year	Name	Character	Starring
1981	《I.Q. 100》	Ah Man	Patricia Chong, Kenneth Choi, Blanche Tang, Dang Wai-Si
1981	《Agency 24》		Rosamund Kwan, Leslie Cheung, Max Mok (replacing Paul after an accident during shooting)
