= City on Fire (1987 film) =

1987 Hong Kong film by Ringo Lam

- Theatrical release poster
- Directed by: Ringo Lam
- Screenplay by: Tommy Sham
- Story by: Ringo Lam
- Produced by: Karl Maka; Ringo Lam
- Starring: Chow Yun-fat; Danny Lee; Sun Yueh; Carrie Ng; Roy Cheung
- Cinematography: Andrew Lau
- Edited by: Wong Ming-lam
- Music by: Teddy Robin Kwan
- Distributed by: Cinema City & Films Co. (Hong Kong)
- Release date: 13 February 1987
- Running time: 105 minutes
- Country: Hong Kong
- Language: Cantonese
- Budget: HK$6,000,000
- Box office: HK$19,723,505; NT$6,914,417

City on Fire (traditional Chinese: 龍虎風雲; simplified Chinese: 龙虎风云; Jyutping: lung4 fu2 fung1 wan4; lit. 'The Wind and Clouds of the Dragon and the Tiger') is a 1987 Hong Kong action thriller film directed by Ringo Lam. It stars Chow Yun-fat, Danny Lee, and Sun Yueh. Following Chow's previous film appearance A Better Tomorrow (1986), City on Fire helped establish Chow's popularity as an action star in Asia and to a lesser degree North America.

== Plot ==
An undercover cop, Chan Kam-wah, investigating a group of jewelry thieves, is killed by three attackers. Inspector Lau assigns Ko Chow, another undercover officer, to continue the investigation. Chow hesitates due to a past experience where he had to betray a friend during an undercover mission. The thieves attempt to rob a jewelry factory but are interrupted by the police which ends with one of the robbers killing a police officer. A task force led by Inspector John Chan is formed to investigate the gang, leading to a rivalry between Chan and Lau.

Chow offers the gang weapons for sale through Tai Song, a middleman, but is followed by Chan's team during the meeting. Chow successfully plants a recording device on himself and arranges to meet the gang again. Chow's girlfriend, Hung, plans to leave with another man, Tso, to Canada. Chow tries to stop her and proposes marriage, but she challenges him to prove his sincerity by meeting her at the registry office the next day. Due to Chow getting tailed by Chan's men, he is unable to arrive. He is rescued by gang member Fu, who takes him to the weapons deal. There, gang leader Nam invites Chow to join an upcoming jewelry heist.

Fu then drives Chow to the airport, where he attempts to stop Hung from departing Hong Kong with Tso. As he approaches Hung at the gate, Chow is arrested by Chan's team for the weapons deal. Chow is tortured by Chan's men, but Lau intervenes and suggests that Chow participates in the gang's planned robbery to catch them in the act. The police are unaware of which jewelry store the gang will target, but have multiple teams ready on standby. Chow spends time with the gang before the heist, growing closer to Fu. Nam designates the Tai Kong jewelry store as their target.

During the heist, a shootout occurs, and gang members Bill and Joe are killed. Chow realizes that Fu is the one responsible for killing the officer during the jewelry factory heist. Chow, Fu and gang members Skinny and Big Song escape to a hideout at the harbor, and Chow is mortally wounded in the process. Nam accuses Chow of being an informant, but Fu defends him, initiating a Mexican standoff. The police then arrive and open fire on the hideout, killing Big Song. Nam then kills Skinny for attempting to surrender, but is shot dead by Fu and Chow before he can kill them as well. Chow confesses to Fu that he's an undercover cop and asks for a quick death. However, Fu can't bring himself to do it. The police breach the hideout, and in the ensuing confrontation, Chow dies from his wound. Fu is arrested, and Inspector Lau is devastated by Chow's death and hits Inspector Chan over the head with a brick for his arrogance and actions.

== Cast ==
Sources:

- Chow Yun-fat as Ko Chow
- Danny Lee as Fu
- Sun Yueh as Inspector Lau / Uncle Kung
- Carrie Ng as Hung
- Roy Cheung as Inspector John Chan
- Maria Cordero as Lounge Singer
- Fong Yau as Chow Nam
- Victor Hon as Bill
- Lau Kong as Inspector Chow
- Elvis Tsui as Chan Kam-wah
- Tommy Wong Kwong-leung as Kwong
- Cheng Mang-ha as Ko Chow's Grandmother
- Parkman Wong as Detective
- Jessica Chow as Lily
- Ringo Lam as Ko Chow's Contact
- Joe Chu as Joe
- Chan Chi-fai as Big Song
- William Ko Ka-kui as Nightclub Boss

== Production ==
The film was based on the Time Watch company robbery in 1984. Lam attended the trial of the criminals, and stated "I found out they didn’t dress well, and everybody looked like a loser", with Lam stating he wanted to embrace realism in the film. Filming began in Hong Kong in 1986 and concluded around the Christmas season. The budget was HK$6,000,000.

== Reception ==
=== Box office ===
The film made HK$19,723,505 and NT$6,914,417.

=== Critical response ===
On the review aggregator website Rotten Tomatoes, 89% of 18 critics' reviews are positive, with an average rating of 6.6/10. The film won the awards for Best Director and Best Actor (Chow Yun-fat) at the 7th Hong Kong Film Awards.

In 2005, it was voted one of the "100 Best Chinese Films" by the Hong Kong Film Awards Association.

== Influence ==
Quentin Tarantino's 1992 film Reservoir Dogs includes several similar key plot elements and scenes, including the Mexican standoff near the end of the film. After critic Jeffrey Dawson noted "in jest, similar elements" in Empire, other publications including Film Threat promoted the observation, and a Michigan film student created a 1995 short film, Who Do You Think You're Fooling?, which mixed dialog and visuals from both movies to demonstrate the similarities. In addition to Reservoir Dogs, critic Matt McAllister notes that one "can equally see the influence of City on Fire—and similar Hong Kong cops-and-robbers movies—on many other Hollywood 'undercover cop' movies such as Point Break."

At the 1994 Cannes film festival, Tarantino addressed accusations of plagiarizing the film, stating "I love City on Fire and I have the poster for it framed in my house. It's a great movie. I steal from every movie. I steal from every single movie ever made. I love it. If my work has anything it's that I'm taking this from this and that from that and mixing them together and if people don't like them then tough titty, don't go and see it, alright. I steal from everything. Great artists steal, they don't do homages." In a 1995 interview, Lam stated he did not mind the accusations of plagiarism, saying: "I am lucky that people can take my film and compare it with Reservoir Dogs. It can only make my name better known and help my career actually", noting that he had taken inspiration from Hollywood films himself.

Chow Yun-fat and Danny Lee appeared together two years later in John Woo's The Killer, where again their characters bond despite being on opposite sides of the law. However, there is a role reversal, as Chow plays a hitman while Lee is a cop.

The 2002 Bollywood film Kaante was inspired by both City on Fire and Reservoir Dogs.
