= Allen Fong =

Hong Kong film director

- Born: 10 July 1947 (age 79)
- Occupation: Film director
- Years active: 1981–1997
- Awards: Hong Kong Film Awards – Best Director; 1982 Father and Son; 1983 Ah Ying; 1987 Just like the Weather; Best Film; 1982 Father and Son; 1983 Ah Ying

Chinese name
- Traditional Chinese: 方育平
- Simplified Chinese: 方育平
Transcriptions

Allen Fong Yuk-ping (方育平) (born July 10, 1947) is a film director and one of the leaders of the Hong Kong New Wave of the late 1970s and early 1980s. His cinematic style is highly influenced by Italian neorealism. He also usually uses personal or real-life stories as the basis for his films.

Despite his limited number of productions, he is one of the directors to have won "Best Director" three times at the Hong Kong Film Awards. Others who share this achievement are Ann Hui and Johnnie To. He won in 1982 for Father and Son. His 1983 film Ah Ying was entered into the 34th Berlin International Film Festival.

== Filmography ==
- Father and Son (1981)
- Ah Ying (1983)
- Just like the Weather (1986)
- Dancing Bull (1990)
- A Little Life-Opera (1998)
- Tibetan Tao (documentary, 2000)
