= 21st Hong Kong Film Awards =

2002 Hong Kong Film Awards

- Date: 21 April 2002
- Site: Hong Kong Cultural Centre
- Hosted by: Eric Tsang; Cecilia Yip; Jacqueline Pang; Cheung Tat-Ming

The 21st Hong Kong Film Awards ceremony was held on 21 April 2002 in the Hong Kong Cultural Centre and hosted by Eric Tsang, Cecilia Yip, Jacqueline Pang and Cheung Tat-Ming. Twenty-three winners in eighteen categories were unveiled. The year's biggest winner was Shaolin Soccer, winning six awards in total. Its director and leading actor Stephen Chow was awarded Best Director and a Best Actor title, after being nominated for the award seven times since 1991. The 21st Hong Kong Film Awards also saw the establishment of the Best Asian Film category, open to all non-Hong Kong films commercially released in Hong Kong within the previous calendar year. The first winner for this category is the Japanese animated feature Spirited Away.

== Awards ==
Winners are listed first, highlighted in boldface, and indicated with a double dagger (‡).

**Best Film**: **Shaolin Soccer**‡; Beijing Rocks; July Rhapsody; Love on a Diet; Lan Yu	**Best Director**: **Stephen Chow — Shaolin Soccer**‡; Ann Hui — July Rhapsody; Ann Hui — Visible Secret; Johnnie To and Wai Ka-Fai — Love on a Diet; Stanley Kwan — Lan Yu
**Best Screenplay**: **Ivy Ho — July Rhapsody**‡; Stephen Chow — Tsang Kan-Cheung — Shaolin Soccer; GC Goo-Bi — Merry-Go-Round; Vincent Kok and Pang Ho-Cheung — You Shoot, I Shoot; Jimmy Ngai — Lan Yu	**Best Actor**: **Stephen Chow — Shaolin Soccer**‡; Jacky Cheung — July Rhapsody; Andy Lau — Love on a Diet; Hu Jun — Lan Yu; Liu Ye — Lan Yu
**Best Actress**: **Sylvia Chang — Forever and Ever**‡; Sammi Cheng — Fighting for Love; Anita Mui — July Rhapsody; Sammi Cheng — Love on a Diet; Sammi Cheng — Wu Yen	**Best Supporting Actor**: **Wong Yat-fei — Shaolin Soccer**‡; Patrick Tam — Born Wild; David Lee — From the Queen to the Chief Executive; Lam Ka-Tung — Dance of a Dream; Simon Yam — Midnight Fly
**Best Supporting Actress**: **Karena Lam — July Rhapsody**‡; Josie Ho — Forever and Ever; Kara Wai — Visible Secret; Cecilia Yip — The Avenging Fist; Su Jin — Lan Yu	**Best New Performer**: **Karena Lam — July Rhapsody**‡; Niki Chow — Dummy Mommy, Without a Baby; Lawrence Chou — Merry-Go-Round; Zeny Kwok — Glass Tears; Charlene Choi — Funeral March
**Best Cinematography**: **Arthur Wong — Visible Secret**‡; Kwen Pak-Huen and Andy Kwong — Shaolin Soccer; Peter Pau — Beijing Rocks; Henry Chung — Peony Pavilion; Yang Tao and Zhang Jian — Lan Yu	**Best Film Editing**: **Eric Kong — The Accidental Spy**‡; Kai Kit-Wai — Shaolin Soccer; David Richardson — Fulltime Killer; Marco Mak — The Legend of Zu; William Chang — Lan Yu
**Best Art Direction**: **Lou Zhongguo and Yan Zhanlin — Peony Pavilion**‡; Man Lim-Chung — July Rhapsody; Cyrus Ho and Fu Delin — The Legend of Zu; Bruce Yu — Wu Yen; William Chang — Lan Yu	**Best Costume Make Up Design**: **Yeung Fan — Peony Pavilion**‡; Hilda Choi — Shaolin Soccer; William Fung, Mabel Kwan and Lee Pik-Kwan — The Legend of Zu; Bruce Yu — Wu Yen; William Chang — Lan Yu
**Best Action Choreography**: **Tung Wai and Jackie Chan Stunt Team — The Accidental Spy**‡; Ching Siu-tung — Shaolin Soccer; Ching Siu-tung — My Schoolmate, The Barbarian; Corey Yuen — The Avenging Fist; Yuen Wo Ping, Yuen Bun, Ku Huen-Chiu and Yuen Siu-tien — The Legend of Zu	**Best Original Film Score**: **Steve Ho — My Life as MuDull**‡; Raymond Wong — Shaolin Soccer; Henry Lai Wan-man — Beijing Rocks; Mui Lam-Mau — Midnight Fly; Zhang Yadong — Lan Yu
**Best Original Film Song**: **終生美麗 — Love on a Diet**‡; Composer: Chan Fai-Yeung; Lyricist: Albert Leung; Singer: Sammi Cheng; 踢出個未來 — Shaolin Soccer; Composer: Jackie Chan; Lyricist: Andy Lau; Singer: Andy Lau; 回憶之前，忘記之後 — Beijing Rocks; Composer: Henry Lai Wan-man; Lyricist: Alex Law; Singer: Wang Feng; Para Para Sakura — Para Para Sakura; Composer: Peter Kam; Lyricist: Chan Siu-Kei; Singer: Aaron Kwok; 明明 — Peony Pavilion; Composer: Chan San-Lie; Lyricist: Yiu Him; Singer: Sandy Lam	**Best Sound Design**: **Kinson Tsang — Shaolin Soccer**‡; Kinson Tsang — Beijing Rocks; Tu Duu Chih — Visible Secret; Kinson Tsang — The Accidental Spy; Martin Chappell — The Legend of Zu
**Best Visual Effects**: **Frankie Chung, Ken Law, Ronald To** **and Maurice Ng — Shaolin Soccer**‡; Eddy Wong — 2002; Eddy Wong, Bryan Cheung, Victor Wong and Thalia Tau — The Avenging Fist; Stephen Ma, Jonathan Ting and Jacky Tang — The Accidental Spy; Eddy Wong, Koan Hui, Joe Bauer — The Legend of Zu	**Best Asian Film**: **Spirited Away (Japan**‡; Yi Yi (Taiwan); Happy End (South Korea); Roots and Branches (China); Shower (China)
