= Hong Kong Film Award for Best Actress =

Annual Hong Kong film award

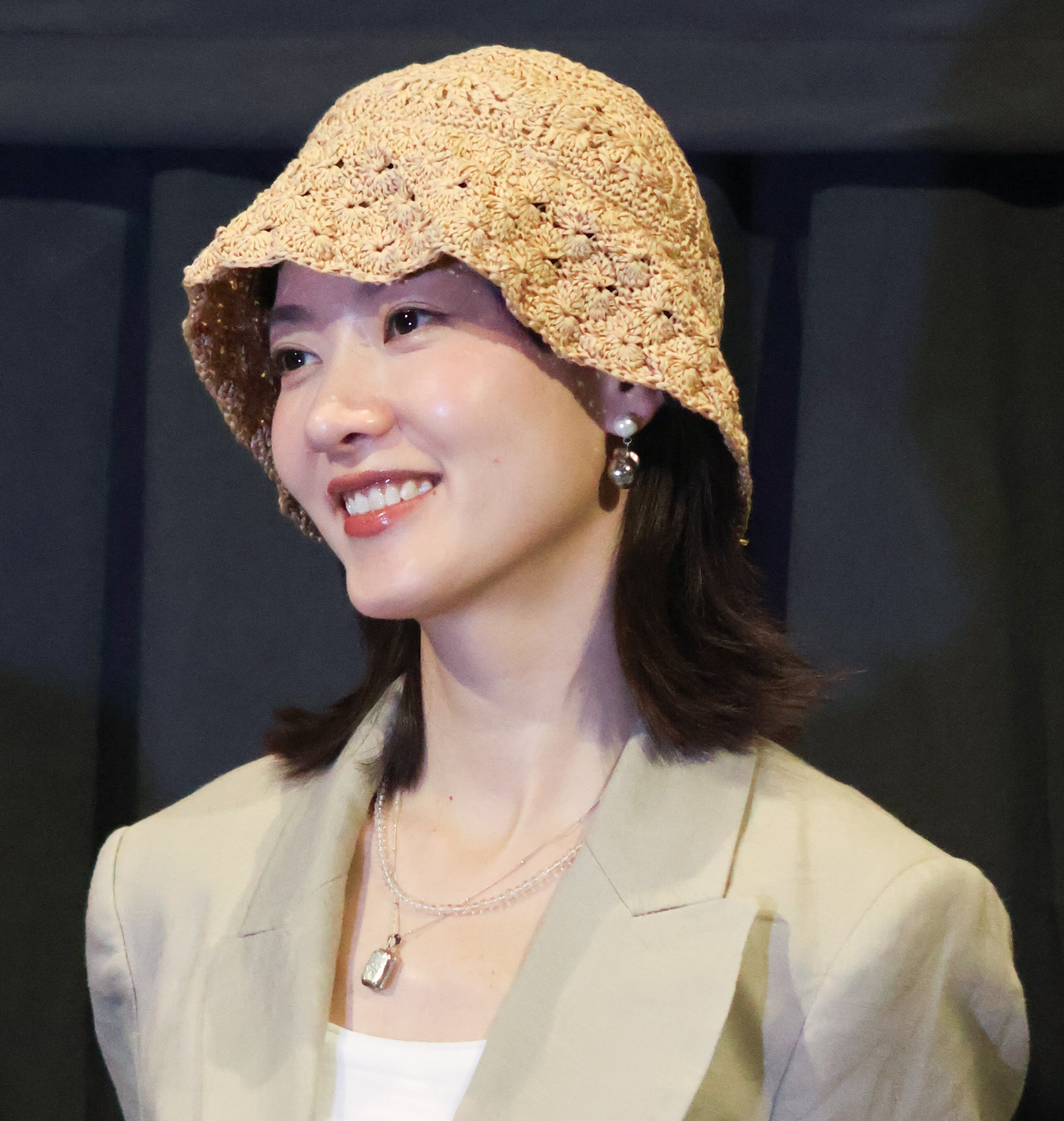
- The 2026 recipient: Fish Liew
- Awarded for: Best Performance by an Actress in a leading role
- Country: Hong Kong
- Presented by: Hong Kong Film Awards Association
- First award: 1982 (for performances in films released in 1981/1982)
- Currently held by: Fish Liew for Someone Like Me (2026)
- Website: hkfaa.com

The Hong Kong Film Award for Best Actress is an award presented annually at the Hong Kong Film Awards (HKFA). It is given to honour an actress who has delivered an outstanding performance in a Hong Kong film.^{[Note 1]} The 1st Hong Kong Film Awards ceremony was held in 1982, with no formal nomination procedure established; the award was given to Kara Wai for her role in My Young Auntie. After the first award ceremony, a nomination system was put in place whereby no more than five nominations are made for each category and each entry is selected through two rounds of voting. Firstly, prospective nominees are marked with a weight of 50% each from HKFA voters and a hundred professional adjudicators, contributing towards a final score with which the top five nominees advance to the second round of voting. The winner is then selected via a scoring process where 55% of the vote comes from 55 professional adjudicators, 25% from representatives of the Hong Kong Performing Artistes Guild and 20% from all other HKFA Executive Committee Members.

Maggie Cheung holds the title of the most awards received having been honoured on 5 separate occasions. Sylvia Chang holds the record for the most nominated actress with 12 nominations.

== Winners and nominees ==
In the following table award nominees are listed by year corresponding to the Hong Kong Film Awards' annual presentation ceremony. At the first incarnation of the ceremony in 1982 awards were presented to winners with no nominees selected. Thereafter, the winner is chosen from a list of nominees from the chosen category.

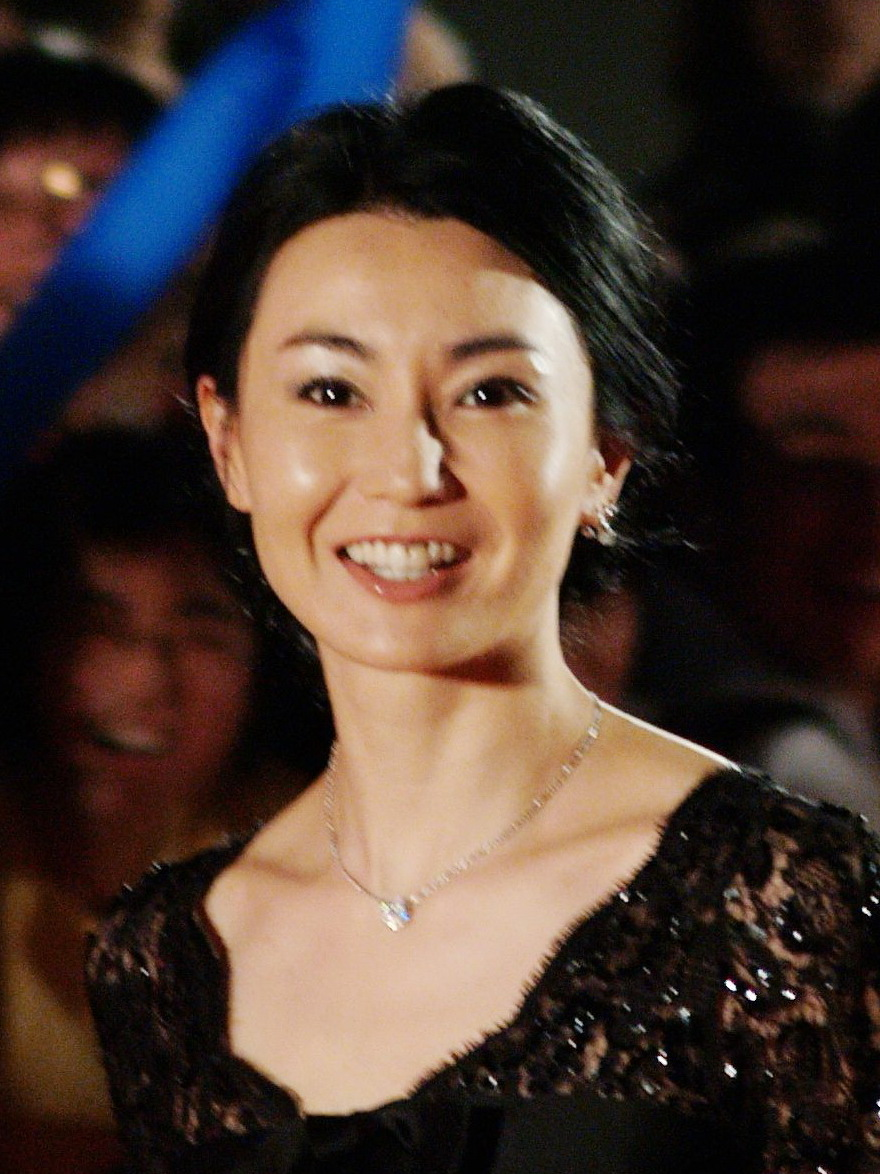
Maggie Cheung won the award five times for A Fishy Story (1989), Center Stage (1991), Comrades: Almost a Love Story (1996), The Soong Sisters (1997) and In the Mood for Love (2000).

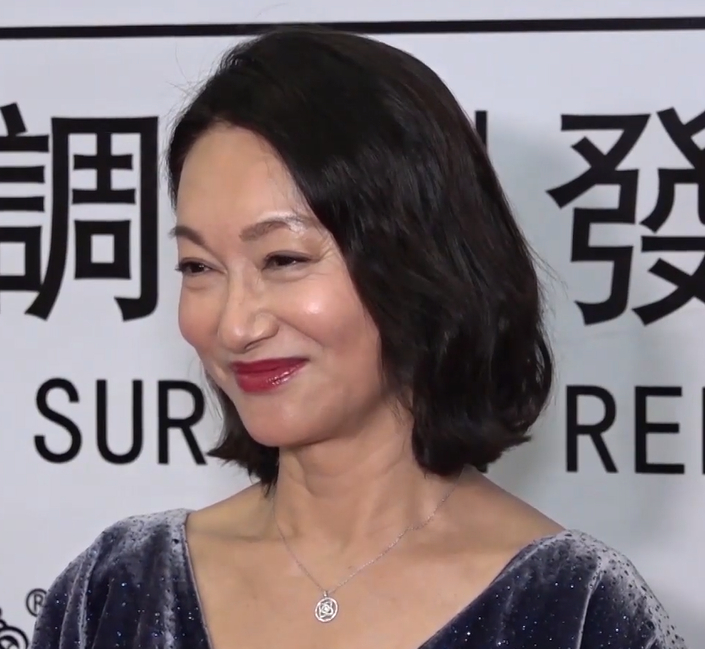
Kara Wai won the award thrice for My Young Auntie (1981), At the End of Daybreak (2010) and Happiness (2017).

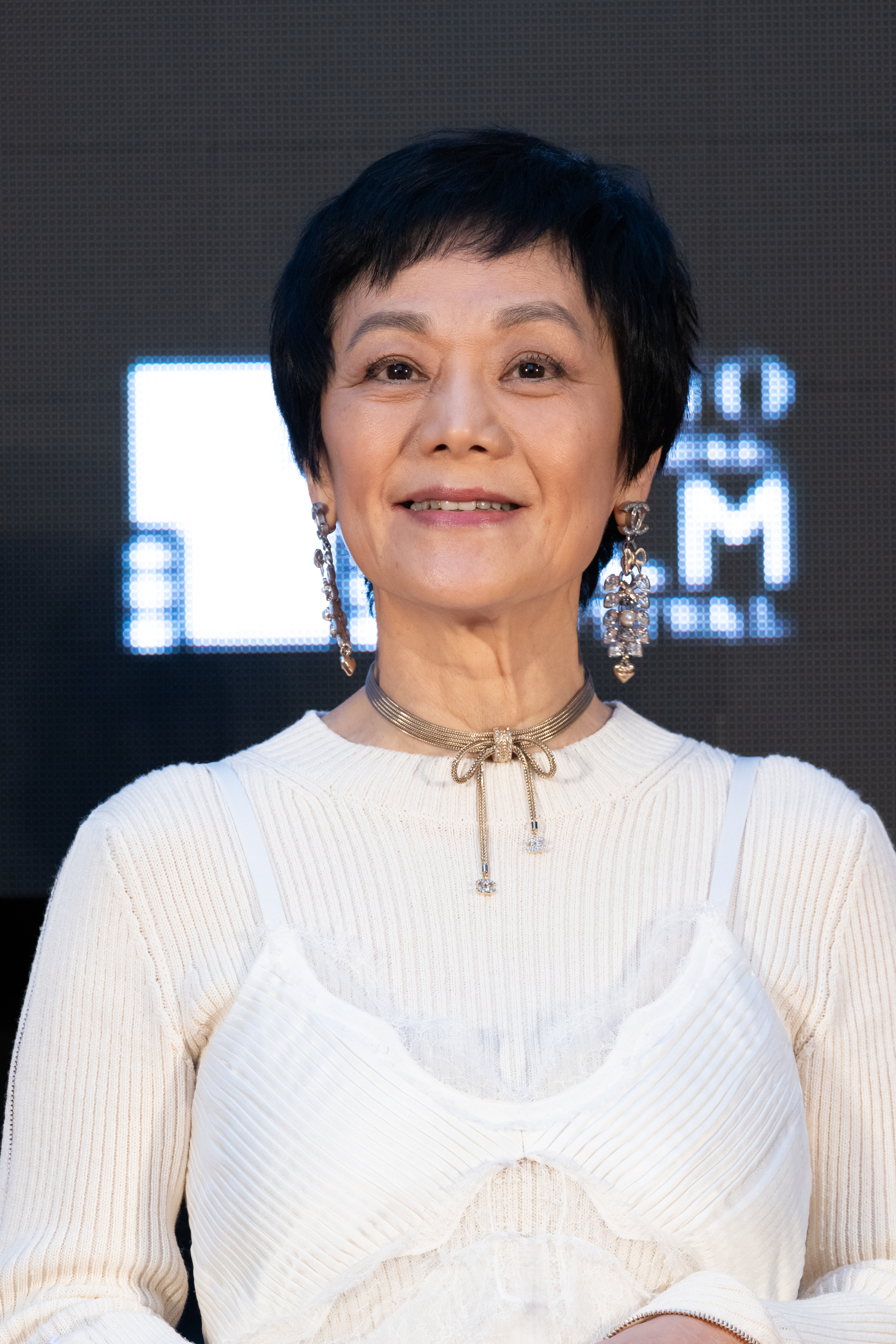
Sylvia Chang won the award twice for Passion (1986) and Forever and Ever (2002).

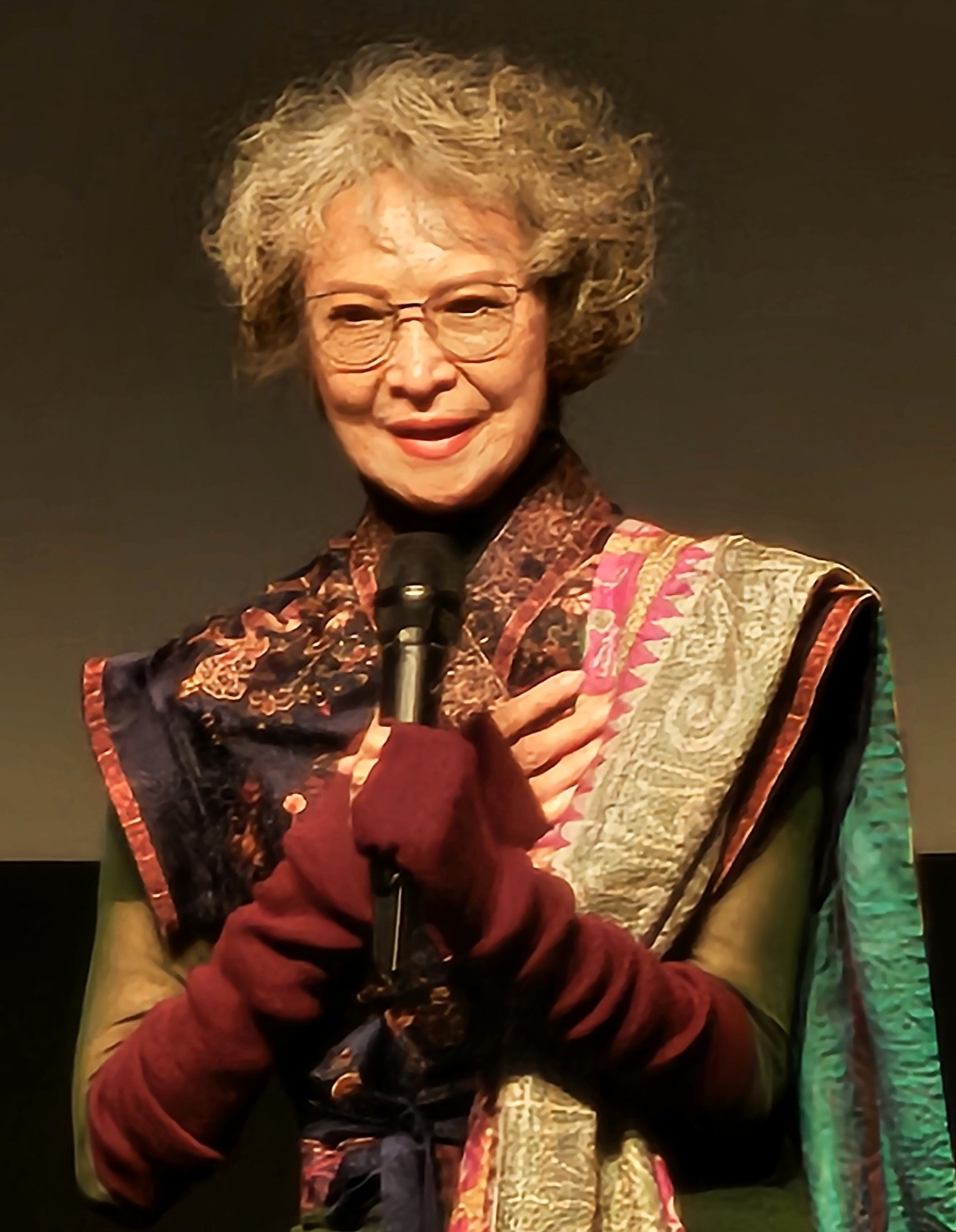
Josephine Siao won the award twice for The Wrong Couples (1987) and Summer Snow (1995).

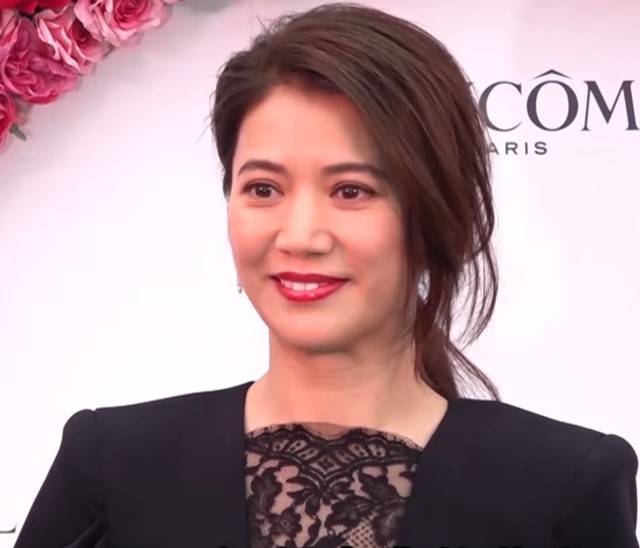
Anita Yuen won the award two years in a row for C'est la vie, mon chéri (1993) and He's a Woman, She's a Man (1994).

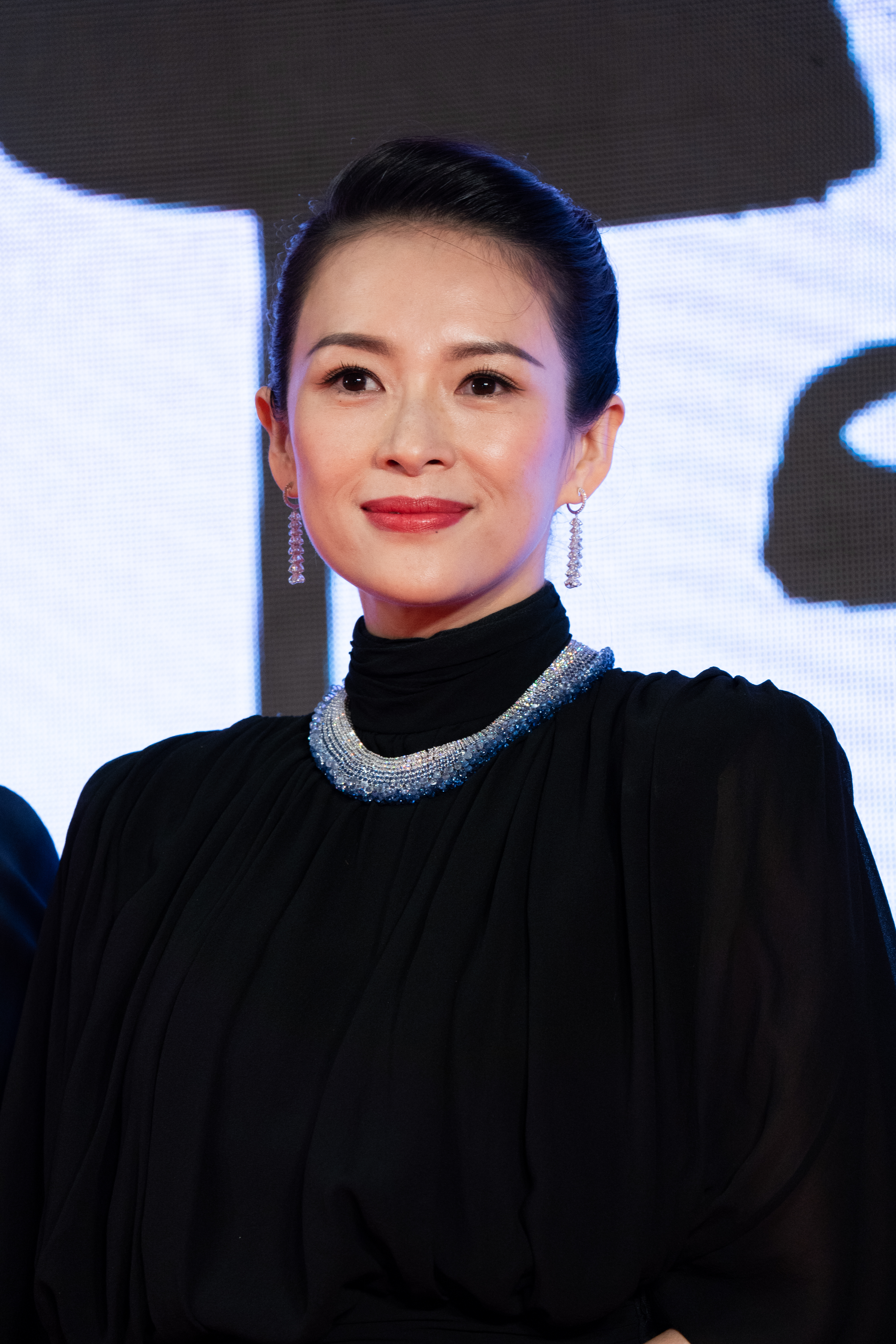
Zhang Ziyi won the award twice for 2046 (2005) and The Grandmaster (2014).

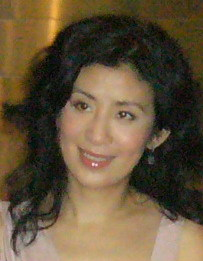
Sandra Ng won in 1998 for Portland Street Blues.

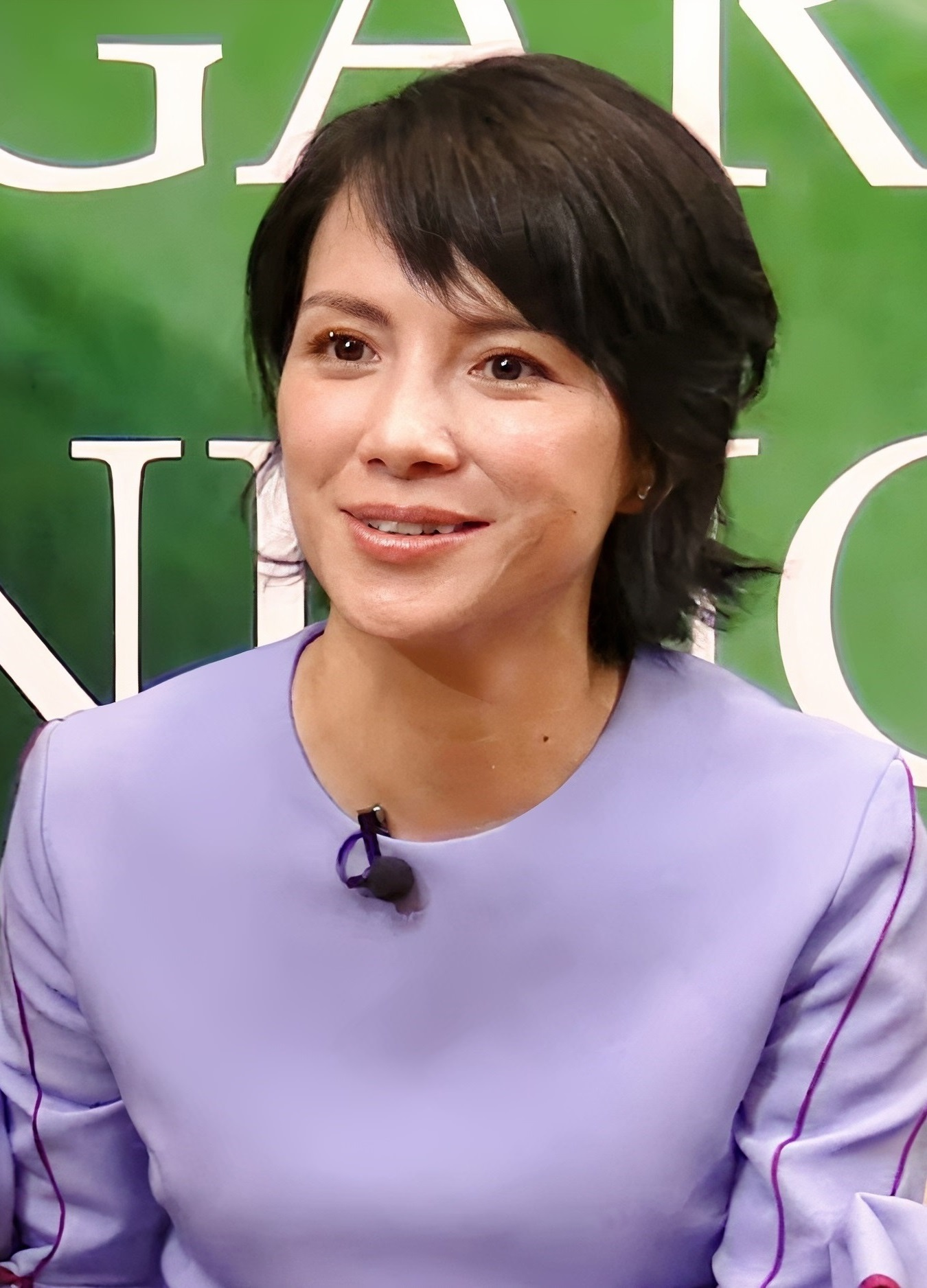
Angelica Lee won in 2003 for The Eye.

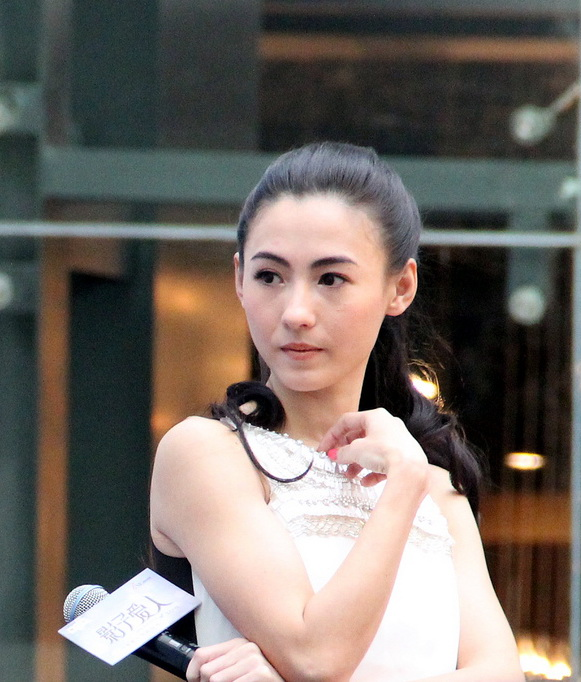
Cecilia Cheung won in 2004 for Lost in Time.

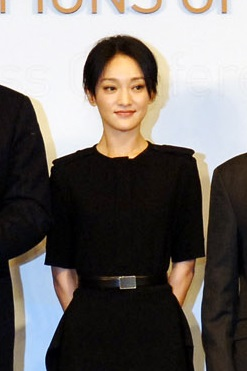
Zhou Xun won in 2006 for Perhaps Love.

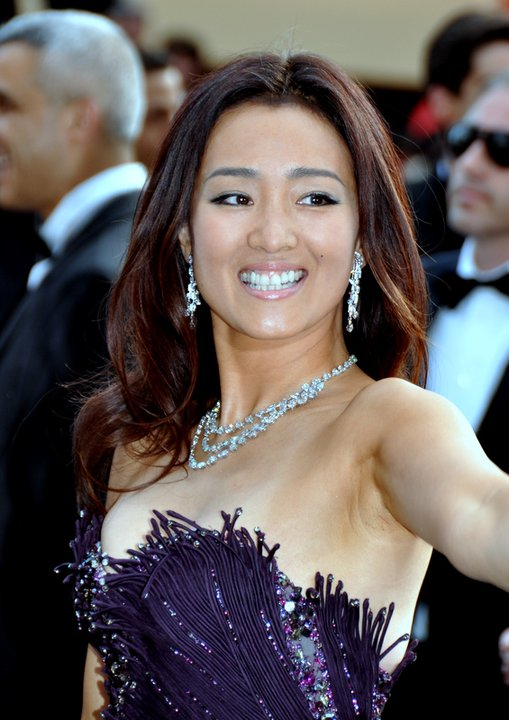
Gong Li won in 2007 for Curse of the Golden Flower.

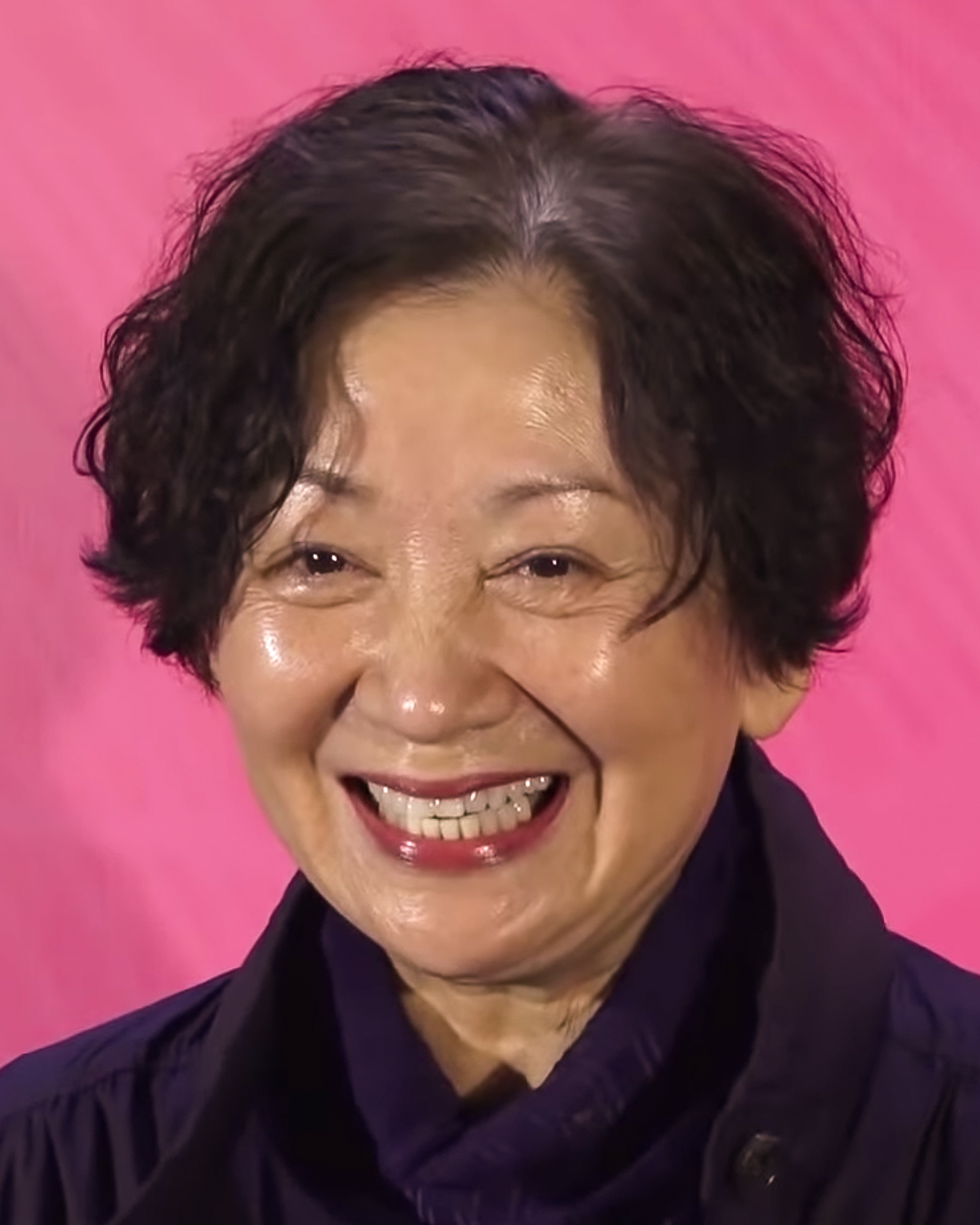
Paw Hee-Ching won in 2009 for The Way We Are.

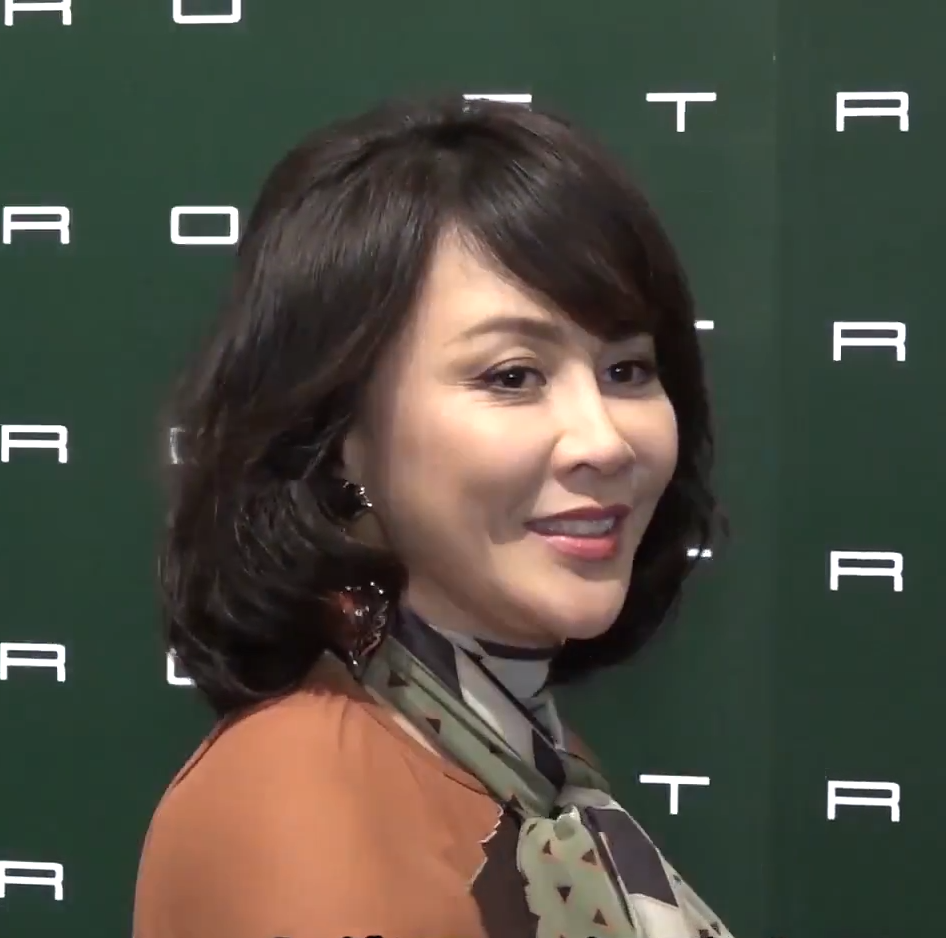
Carina Lau won in 2011 for Detective Dee and the Mystery of the Phantom Flame.

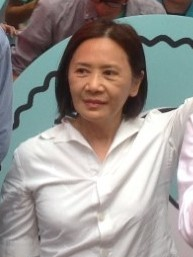
Deanie Ip won in 2012 for A Simple Life.

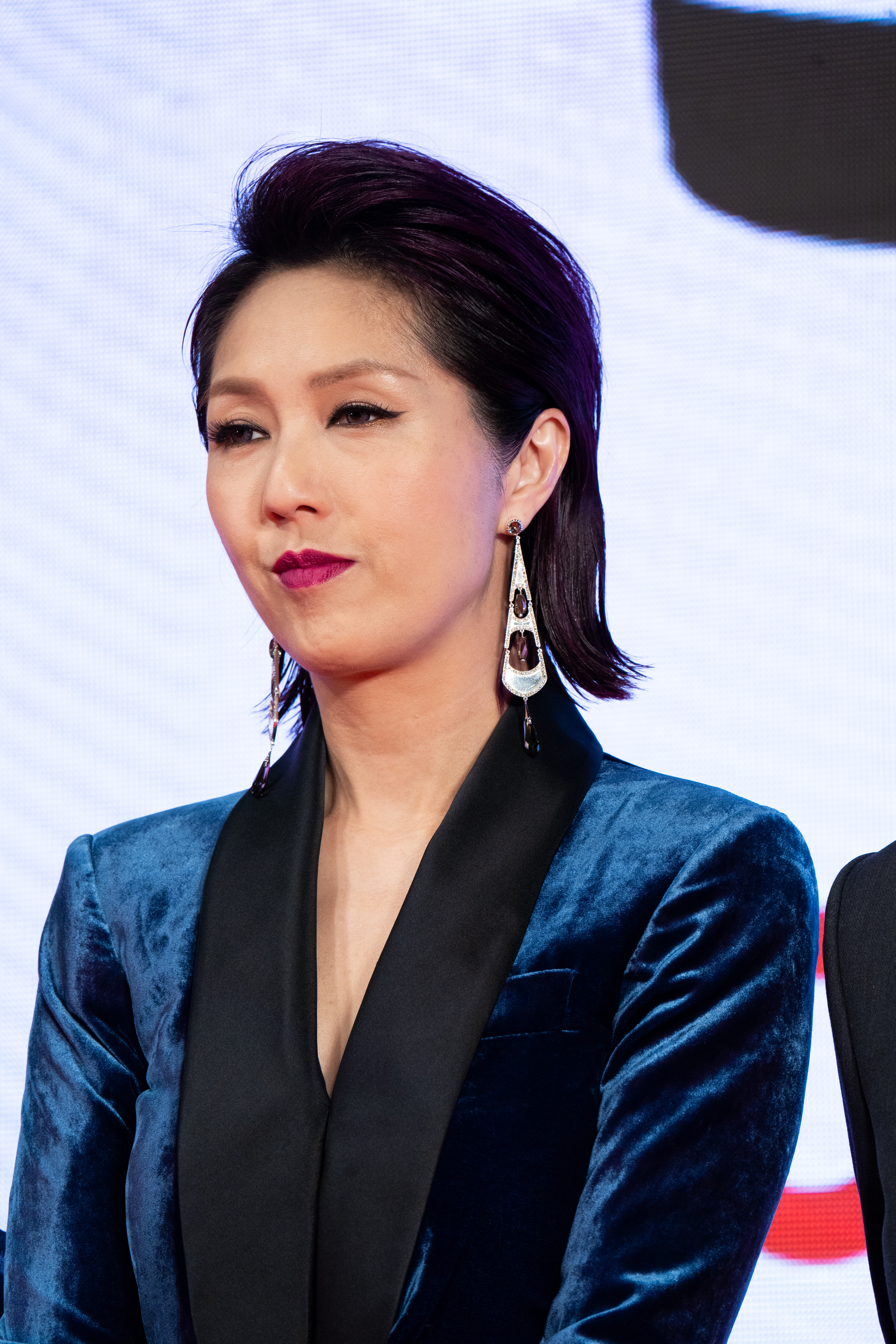
Miriam Yeung won in 2013 for Love in the Buff.

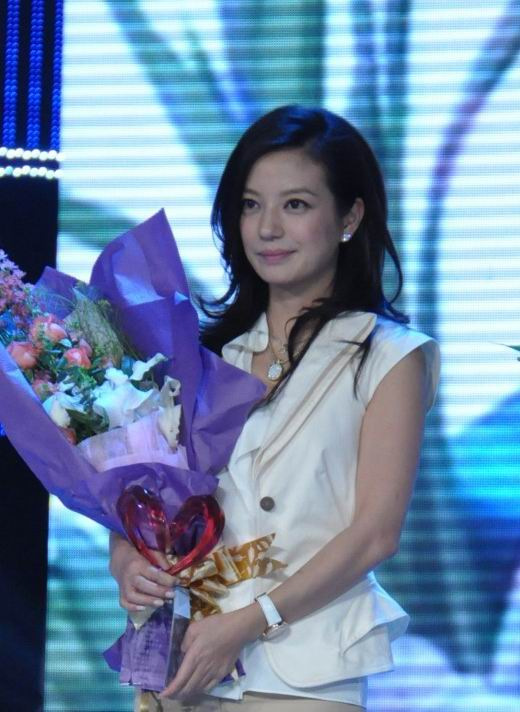
Zhao Wei won in 2015 for Dearest.

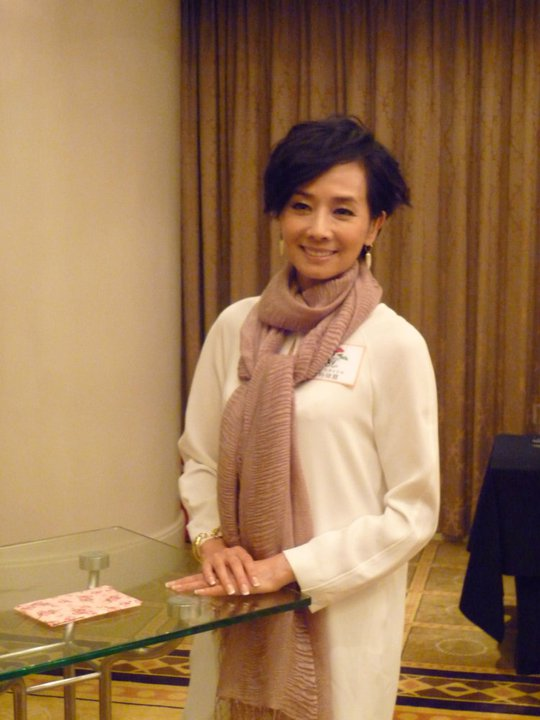
Teresa Mo won in 2018 for Tomorrow Is Another Day.

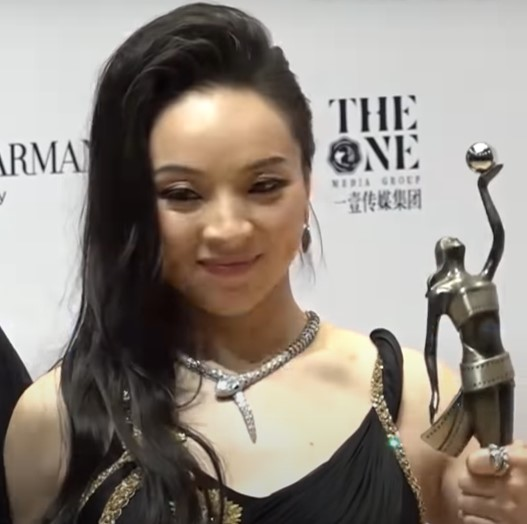
Chloe Maayan won in 2019 for Three Husbands.

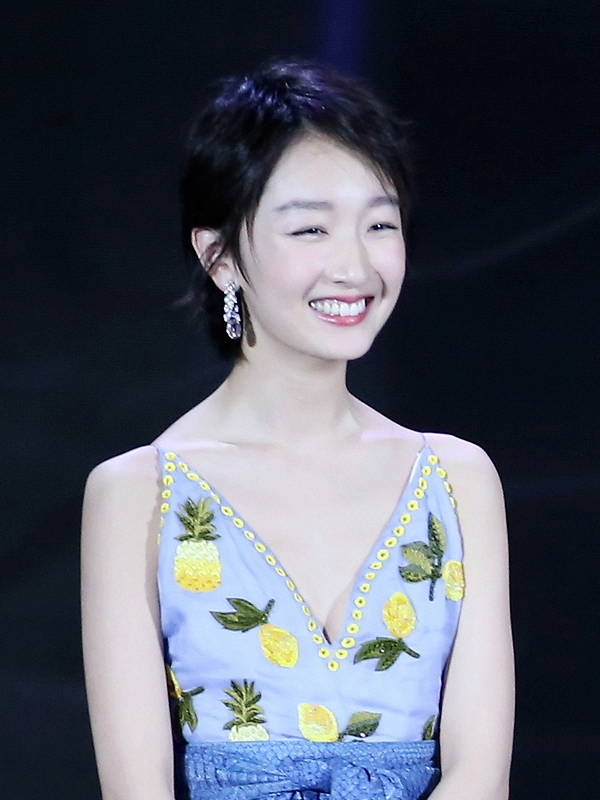
Zhou Dongyu won in 2020 for Better Days.

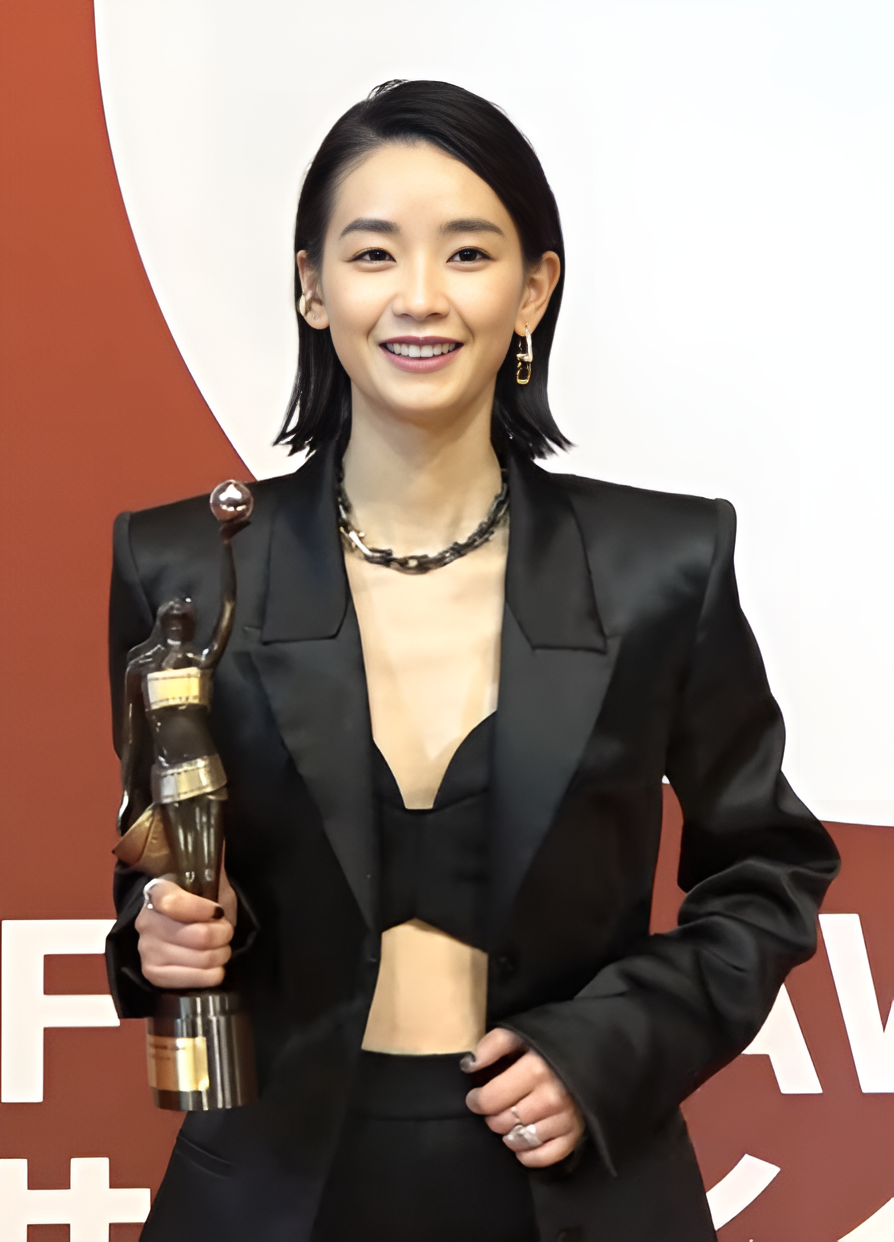
Cya Liu won in 2022 for Limbo.

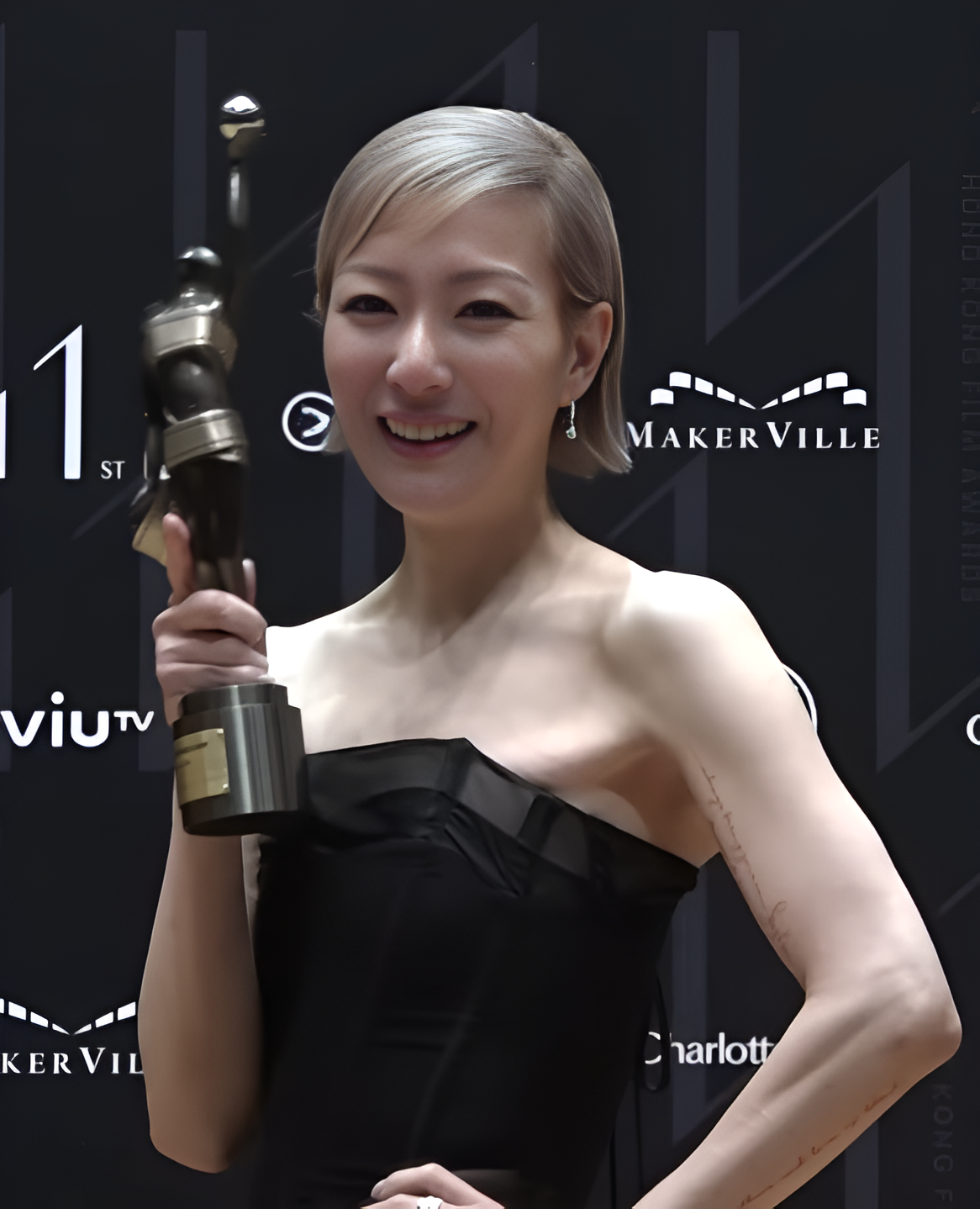
Sammi Cheng won in 2023 for Lost Love.

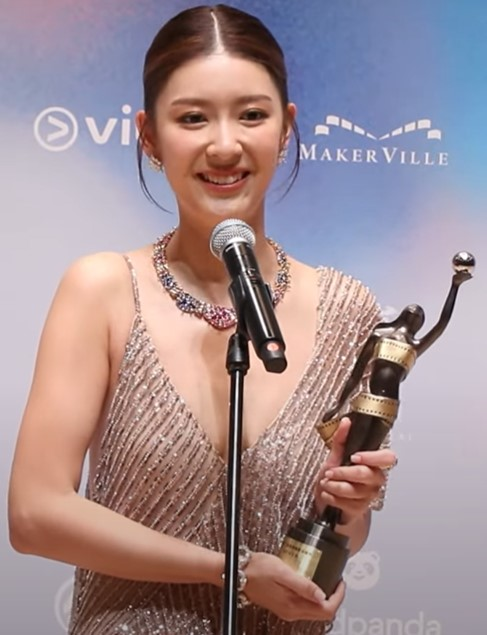
Jennifer Yu won in 2024 for In Broad Daylight.

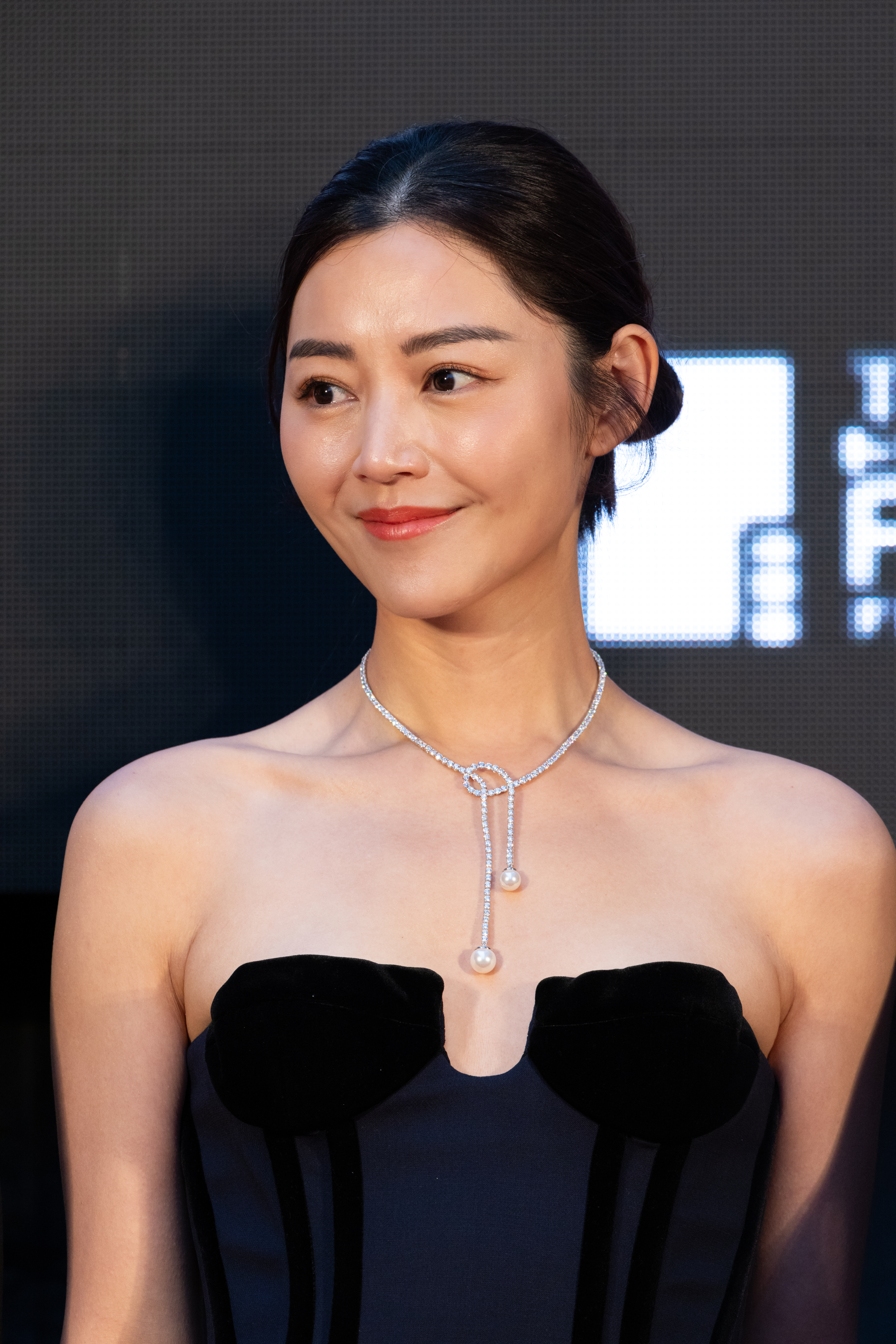
Michelle Wai won in 2025 for The Last Dance.

Table key
‡	Indicates the winner

=== 1982–2019 ===
Year	Actress	Film	Role(s)	Ref.
1981 (1st)	Kara Wai ‡	My Young Auntie	Cheng Tai-Nan	
1982 (2nd)	Becky Lam ‡	Lonely Fifteen	Bik-Kei Lam	
1982 (2nd)	Cherie Chung	Eclipse	Fu Min	
1982 (2nd)	Season Ma	Boat People	Cam Nuong	
1982 (2nd)	Cora Miao	Boat People	Nguyen's Mistress	
1982 (2nd)	Sylvia Chang	Aces Go Places	Supt. Nancy Ho	
1983 (3rd)	Cecilia Yip ‡	Let's Make Laugh	Yeung Noi-dong	
1983 (3rd)	So-ying Hui	Ah Ying	Ah Ying	
1983 (3rd)	Liu Xiaoqing	Reign Behind a Curtain	Dowager Empress	
1983 (3rd)	Cherie Chung	Hong Kong, Hong Kong	Man Si Sun	
1983 (3rd)	Brigitte Lin	Zu Warriors from the Magic Mountain	Countess	
1984 (4th)	Siqin Gaowa ‡	Homecoming	Pearl	
1984 (4th)	Cecilia Yip	Hong Kong 1941	Han Yuk Nam	
1984 (4th)	Deanie Ip	Wrong Wedding Trail	Miss Cheng	
1984 (4th)	Sylvia Chang	Shanghai Blues	Shu-Shu	
1984 (4th)	Josephine Koo	Homecoming	Coral Zhang	
1985 (5th)	Pauline Wong ‡	Love with the Perfect Stranger	Wong Gam Gam	
1985 (5th)	Pat Ha	My Name Ain't Suzie	Mary Lai Shui Mei	
1985 (5th)	Deanie Ip	The Unwritten Law	Lau Wai Lan	
1985 (5th)	Brigitte Lin	Police Story	Selina Fong	
1985 (5th)	Cora Miao	Women	Bao-er	
1986 (6th)	Sylvia Chang ‡	Passion	Wendy Pai	
1986 (6th)	Sally Yeh	Peking Opera Blues	Pat Neil	
1986 (6th)	Pan Hong	The Last Emperor	Li Shuxian	
1986 (6th)	Yuk Guen Lee	Just Like Weather	Christine	
1986 (6th)	Season Ma	Silent Love	Heung Gite	
1987 (7th)	Josephine Siao ‡	The Wrong Couples	Wong Mui	
1987 (7th)	Cherie Chung	An Autumn's Tale	Jennifer	
1987 (7th)	Carol Cheng	Wonder Women	Leung Ho Kau	
1987 (7th)	Joey Wang	A Chinese Ghost Story	Lit Sin Seen	
1987 (7th)	Din Long Lee	Final Victory	Ping	
1987 (7th)	Loletta Lee	Final Victory	Mimi	
1988 (8th)	Anita Mui ‡	Rouge	Fleur	
1988 (8th)	Cora Miao	Keep on Dancing	Chieh Chang Chang	
1988 (8th)	Carol Cheng	Heart to Hearts	Chu Lai Ngor	
1988 (8th)	Niu Tien	The Other ½ & the Other ½	June Lee	
1988 (8th)	Maggie Cheung	As Tears Go By	Ngor	
1989 (9th)	Maggie Cheung ‡	A Fishy Story	Huang	
1989 (9th)	Sylvia Chang	All About Ah-Long	Sylvia Poon	
1989 (9th)	Sylvia Chang	Eight Taels of Gold	Odds and Ends	
1989 (9th)	Carrie Ng	The First Time is the Last Time	Winnie Wong	
1989 (9th)	Bo-Bo Fung	Beyond the Sunset	May	
1989 (9th)	Carina Lau	Her Beautiful Life Lies	Carole Chang	
1990 (10th)	Carol Cheng ‡	Her Fatal Ways	Cheng Shih-Nan	
1990 (10th)	Carina Lau	Days of Being Wild	Leung Fung-ying	
1990 (10th)	Maggie Cheung	Farewell China	Li Hung	
1990 (10th)	Sylvia Chang	Queen of Temple Street	Big Sis Wah	
1990 (10th)	Gong Li	A Terra-Cotta Warrior	Dong Er/ Zhu Lili	
1991 (11th)	Cecilia Yip ‡	This Thing Called Love	Yee	
1991 (11th)	Carol Cheng	Her Fatal Ways 2	Cheng Shih-Nan	
1991 (11th)	Anita Mui	Au Revoir, Mon Amour	Mui Ye	
1991 (11th)	Carina Lau	Gigolo and Whore	Chung Siu-Hung	
1991 (11th)	Sharla Cheung	Dances with Dragon	Moon Chan	
1992 (12th)	Maggie Cheung ‡	Center Stage	Ruan Ling-yu	
1992 (12th)	Chingmy Yau	Naked Killer	Kitty / Vivian Shang	
1992 (12th)	Brigitte Lin	Handsome Siblings	Eva Mor, daughter of Eva	
1992 (12th)	Anita Mui	Justice, My Foot!	Madam Sung	
1992 (12th)	Maggie Cheung	New Dragon Gate Inn	Jade King	
1992 (12th)	Brigitte Lin	Swordsman II	Asia the Invincible	
1993 (13th)	Anita Yuen ‡	C'est La Vie Mon Cheri	Min	
1993 (13th)	Josephine Siao	Always on My Mind	Yin Tseung's wife	
1993 (13th)	Josephine Siao	The Legend	Miu Chui-Fa	
1993 (13th)	Carrie Ng	Remains of a Woman	Judy Yu	
1993 (13th)	Veronica Yip	A Roof with a View	Yip Hiu-Tung	
1994 (14th)	Anita Yuen ‡	He's a Woman, She's a Man	Lam Chi Wing	
1994 (14th)	Hui Fan	One of the Lucky Ones	Maid Wo	
1994 (14th)	Faye Wong	Chungking Express	Faye	
1994 (14th)	Chien-lien Wu	The Returning	Elaine	
1994 (14th)	Joan Chen	Red Rose White Rose	Wang Jiao-Rui	
1994 (14th)	Alice Lau	I Have a Date with Spring	Butterfly Yiu	
1995 (15th)	Josephine Siao ‡	Summer Snow	May Sun	
1995 (15th)	Chingmy Yau	I'm Your Birthday Cake!	Cher	
1995 (15th)	Bo-Bo Fung	Mother of a Different Kind	Nurse Lam	
1995 (15th)	Anita Mui	Rumble in the Bronx	Elaine	
1995 (15th)	Cecilia Yip	Peace Hotel	Oman	
1996 (16th)	Maggie Cheung ‡	Comrades: Almost a Love Story	Qiao Li	
1996 (16th)	Gong Li	Temptress Moon	Pang Ruyi	
1996 (16th)	Josephine Siao	Hu Du Men	Lang Kim-Sum	
1996 (16th)	Sandra Ng	4 Faces of Eve	Gam Mo/Chan Giu/Miu Si/Mei Mei	
1996 (16th)	Karen Mok	The God of Cookery	Turkey	
1997 (17th)	Maggie Cheung ‡	The Soong Sisters	Soong Ching-ling	
1997 (17th)	Chien-lien Wu	Eighteen Springs	Gu Manzhen	
1997 (17th)	Shu Qi	Love Is Not a Game, But a Joke	Lee Lai-shan	
1997 (17th)	Paulyn Sun	Island of Greed	Miu-Heung	
1997 (17th)	Carina Lau	Intimates	Wan	
1998 (18th)	Sandra Ng ‡	Portland Street Blues	Sister Thirteen	
1998 (18th)	Shu Qi	City of Glass	Vivian	
1998 (18th)	Fiona Leung	A Hero Never Dies	Fiona	
1998 (18th)	Anita Yuen	Till Death Do Us Part	BoBo	
1998 (18th)	Chingmy Yau	Hold You Tight	Ah Moon	
1999 (19th)	Law Lan ‡	Bullets Over Summer	Granny	
1999 (19th)	Deanie Ip	Crying Heart	Mrs. Fat	
1999 (19th)	Loletta Lee	Ordinary Heroes	Sow	
1999 (19th)	Gigi Leung	Tempting Heart	Sheo-rou	
1999 (19th)	Cecilia Cheung	Fly Me to Polaris	Autumn	
2000 (20th)	Maggie Cheung ‡	In the Mood for Love	Su Li-zhen	
2000 (20th)	Sammi Cheng	Needing You...	Kinki Kwok	
2000 (20th)	Qin Hailu	Durian Durian	Qin Yan	
2000 (20th)	Michelle Yeoh	Crouching Tiger, Hidden Dragon	Yu Shu Lien	
2000 (20th)	Zhang Ziyi	Crouching Tiger, Hidden Dragon	Jen Yu	
2001 (21st)	Sylvia Chang ‡	Forever and Ever	Chi Mo's mom	
2001 (21st)	Sammi Cheng	Wu yen	Chung Wu Yen	
2001 (21st)	Anita Mui	July Rhapsody	Lam Man-Ching	
2001 (21st)	Sammi Cheng	Love on a Diet	Mini Mo	
2001 (21st)	Sammi Cheng	Fighting for Love	Siu Tong	
2002 (22nd)	Angelica Lee ‡	The Eye	Man	
2002 (22nd)	Sandra Ng	Golden Chicken	Kam	
2002 (22nd)	Faye Wong	Chinese Odyssey 2002	Princess Wushuang	
2002 (22nd)	Karena Lam	Inner Senses	Cheung Yan	
2002 (22nd)	Maggie Cheung	Hero	Flying Snow	
2003 (23rd)	Cecilia Cheung ‡	Lost in Time	Siu Wai	
2003 (23rd)	Cecilia Cheung	Running on Karma	Lee Fung Yee	
2003 (23rd)	Sandra Ng	Golden Chicken 2	Kam	
2003 (23rd)	Karena Lam	The Floating Landscape	Maan	
2003 (23rd)	Carina Lau	Infernal Affairs II	Mary Hon	
2004 (24th)	Zhang Ziyi ‡	2046	Bai Ling	
2004 (24th)	Sylvia Chang	20 30 40	Lily	
2004 (24th)	Karena Lam	Koma	Ling	
2004 (24th)	Yuen Qiu	Kung Fu Hustle	Landlady	
2004 (24th)	Cecilia Cheung	One Nite in Mongkok	Dandan	
2005 (25th)	Zhou Xun ‡	Perhaps Love	Sun Na	
2005 (25th)	Sammi Cheng	Everlasting Regret	Wang Qiyao	
2005 (25th)	Karena Lam	Home Sweet Home	Yan Hong	
2005 (25th)	Sylvia Chang	Rice Rhapsody	Jen	
2005 (25th)	Karen Mok	Wait 'Til You're Older	Tsui Man	
2006 (26th)	Gong Li ‡	Curse of the Golden Flower	Empress Phoenix	
2006 (26th)	Teresa Mo	Men Suddenly in Black 2	Chang Wai-Yee	
2006 (26th)	Angelica Lee	Re-cycle	Ting-Yin	
2006 (26th)	Rene Liu	Happy Birthday	Mi	
2006 (26th)	Isabella Leong	Isabella	Bik-Yan Cheung	
2007 (27th)	Siqin Gaowa ‡	The Postmodern Life of My Aunt	Ye Rutang	
2007 (27th)	Teresa Mo	Mr. Cinema	Chan Sau Ying	
2007 (27th)	Zhang Jingchu	Protégé	Jane	
2007 (27th)	Rene Liu	Kidnap	He Wanzhen	
2007 (27th)	Charlene Choi	Simply Actors	Dani Dan	
2008 (28th)	Paw Hee-Ching ‡	The Way We Are	Mrs. Cheung	
2008 (28th)	Prudence Liew	True Women For Sale	Lai Chung-chung	
2008 (28th)	Barbie Shu	Connected	Grace Wong	
2008 (28th)	Zhou Xun	Painted Skin	Xiao Wei	
2008 (28th)	Karena Lam	Claustrophobia	Pearl	
2009 (29th)	Kara Wai ‡	At the End of Daybreak	Tak's mother	
2009 (29th)	Zhang Jingchu	Night and Fog	Wong Hiu Ling	
2009 (29th)	Zhao Wei	Mulan	Hua Mulan	
2009 (29th)	Shu Qi	Look for a Star	Milan Sit	
2009 (29th)	Sandra Ng	Echoes of the Rainbow	Mrs. Law	
2010 (30th)	Carina Lau ‡	Detective Dee and the Mystery of the Phantom Flame	Wu Zetian	
2010 (30th)	Josie Ho	Dream Home	Cheng Lai-Sheung	
2010 (30th)	Fiona Sit	Break Up Club	Flora	
2010 (30th)	Miriam Yeung	Love in a Puff	Cherie	
2010 (30th)	Tang Wei	Crossing Hennessy	Oi-lin	
2011 (31st)	Deanie Ip ‡	A Simple Life	Sister Peach	
2011 (31st)	Shu Qi	A Beautiful Life	Li Pei-ru	
2011 (31st)	Tang Wei	Dragon	Yu	
2011 (31st)	Gao Yuanyuan	Don't Go Breaking My Heart	Zixin	
2011 (31st)	Zhou Xun	Flying Swords of Dragon Gate	Ling Yan-qiu	
2012 (32nd)	Miriam Yeung ‡	Love in the Buff	Cherie	
2012 (32nd)	Sammi Cheng	Romancing in Thin Air	Sue	
2012 (32nd)	Elanne Kong	Love Lifting	Li Li	
2012 (32nd)	Zhou Xun	The Great Magician	Liu Yin	
2012 (32nd)	Zhou Xun	The Silent War	Xue Ning	
2013 (33rd)	Zhang Ziyi ‡	The Grandmaster	Gong Er	
2013 (33rd)	Tang Wei	Finding Mr. Right	Wen Jia-jia	
2013 (33rd)	Sammi Cheng	Blind Detective	Goldie Ho	
2013 (33rd)	Hee Ching Paw	Rigor Mortis	Mui	
2013 (33rd)	Cherry Ngan	The Way We Dance	Lam Fa/ Fleur	
2014 (34th)	Zhao Wei ‡	Dearest	Li Hongqin	
2014 (34th)	Sandra Ng	Golden Chickensss	Kam	
2014 (34th)	Tang Wei	The Golden Era	Zhang Naiying	
2014 (34th)	Zhou Xun	Women Who Flirt	Zhang Hui	
2014 (34th)	Charlene Choi	Sara	Sara	
2015 (35th)	Jessie Li ‡	Port of Call	Wang Jiamei	
2015 (35th)	Miriam Yeung	Little Big Master	Lui Wai-hung	
2015 (35th)	Tang Wei	A Tale of Three Cities	Chen Yuerong	
2015 (35th)	Sylvia Chang	Office	Winnie Chang	
2015 (35th)	Karena Lam	Heaven in the Dark	Michelle	
2016 (36th)	Kara Wai ‡	Happiness	Aunt Fanny	
2016 (36th)	Zhou Dongyu	Soul Mate	Ansheng	
2016 (36th)	Ma Sichun	Soul Mate	Qiyue	
2016 (36th)	Nina Paw	Show Me Your Love	Yau Ngan	
2016 (36th)	Tang Wei	Book of Love	Jiao	
2017 (37th)	Teresa Mo ‡	Tomorrow Is Another Day	Mrs Wong	
2017 (37th)	Sylvia Chang	Love Education	Yue Huiying	
2017 (37th)	Zhou Xun	Our Time Will Come	Lan	
2017 (37th)	Stephy Tang	The Empty Hands	Mari Hirakawa	
2017 (37th)	Chrissie Chau	29+1	Christy Lam	
2018 (38th)	Chloe Maayan ‡	Three Husbands	Ah Mui	
2018 (38th)	Charlene Choi	The Lady Improper	Siu Man	
2018 (38th)	Zhang Jingchu	Project Gutenberg	Yuen Man	
2018 (38th)	Jennifer Yu	Distinction	Qian Siying	
2018 (38th)	Crisel Consunji	Still Human	Evelyn Santos	

=== 2020s ===
Year	Actress	Film	Role(s)	Ref.
2019 (39th)	Zhou Dongyu ‡	Better Days	Chen Nian	
2019 (39th)	Sammi Cheng	Fagara	Acacia Ha	
2019 (39th)	Sammi Cheng	Fatal Visit	Ling	
2019 (39th)	Cecilia Choi	Beyond The Dream	Yan / Yip Lam	
2019 (39th)	Stephy Tang	My Prince Edward	Fong	
2020-21 (40th)	Cya Liu ‡	Limbo	Wong To	
2020-21 (40th)	Chrissie Chau	Madalena	Lena	
2020-21 (40th)	Louise Wong	Anita	Anita Mui	
2020-21 (40th)	Sandra Ng	Zero to Hero	So's mother	
2020-21 (40th)	Gong Li	Leap	Coach Lang Ping	
2023 (41st)	Sammi Cheng ‡	Lost Love	Tin Mei	
2023 (41st)	Louisa So	The Sparring Partner	Carrie Yau	
2023 (41st)	Teresa Mo	Mama's Affair	Mei Fung	
2023 (41st)	Angela Yuen	The Narrow Road	Candy	
2023 (41st)	Sylvia Chang	A Light Never Goes Out	Mei Hsiang	
2024 (42nd)	Jennifer Yu ‡	In Broad Daylight	Kay	
2024 (42nd)	Kay Tse	Band Four	Cat	
2024 (42nd)	Michelle Wai	Ready O/R Rot	Heidi	
2024 (42nd)	Louise Wong	A Guilty Conscience	Jolene Tsang	
2024 (42nd)	Chung Suet Ying	The Lyricist Wannabe	Law Wing Sze	
2025 (43rd)	Michelle Wai ‡	The Last Dance	Yuet	
2025 (43rd)	Patra Au	All Shall Be Well	Angie	
2025 (43rd)	Natalie Hsu	Last Song for You	Summer	
2025 (43rd)	Chung Suet Ying	The Way We Talk	Sophie Fong	
2025 (43rd)	Hedwig Tam	Montages of a Modern Motherhood	Jing	
2026 (44th)	Fish Liew ‡	Someone Like Me	Mui	
2026 (44th)	Natalie Hsu	My First of May	Tang Chi	
2026 (44th)	Ma Li	The Dumpling Queen	Chong Kin-wo	
2026 (44th)	Zhang Ziyi	She's Got No Name	Zhan Zhou	
2026 (44th)	Fala Chen	Peg O' My Heart	Fiona	

== Multiple wins and nominations ==
The following individuals received two or more Best Actress awards:

Wins	Actress	Years
5	Maggie Cheung	1990, 1993, 1997, 1998, 2001
3	Kara Wai	1982, 2010, 2017
2	Anita Yuen	1994, 1995
2	Cecilia Yip	1984, 1992
2	Josephine Siao	1988, 1996
2	Siqin Gaowa	1985, 2008
2	Sylvia Chang	1987, 2002
2	Zhang Ziyi	2005, 2014

The following individuals received five or more Best Actress nominations:

Nominations	Actress
12	Sylvia Chang
10	Sammi Cheng
9	Maggie Cheung
7	Sandra Ng
7	Zhou Xun
6	Carina Lau
6	Karena Lam
6	Tang Wei
5	Anita Mui
5	Josephine Siao

== Age superlatives ==
Record	Actress	Film	Age (in years)	Ref.
Oldest winner	Law Lan	Bullets Over Summer	66	
Oldest nominee	Sylvia Chang	A Light Never Goes Out	69	
Youngest winner	Becky Lam	Lonely Fifteen	17	
Youngest nominee	Becky Lam	Lonely Fifteen	17	

== Notes ==
A film is considered to be a "Hong Kong film" by meeting at least 2 of the following criteria:

1. The film's director is a Hong Kong resident that holds a Hong Kong Identity Card
2. At least one of the film's production companies are legally registered in Hong Kong SAR.
3. At least one person involved in the film's production from any six separate award categories who are Hong Kong resident holding a Hong Kong Identity Card.

== See also ==
- Asian Film Award for Best Actress
- Golden Horse Award for Best Leading Actress

== Bibliography ==
- Bettinson, Gary (2015). Directory of World Cinema: CHINA 2. Intellect. ISBN 978-1-78320-400-7.
- Charles, John (2000). The Hong Kong Filmography. McFarland. ISBN 978-1-4766-0262-2.
- Choi, Jinhee (2009). Horror to the Extreme: Changing Boundaries in Asian Cinema. Hong Kong University Press. ISBN 978-962-209-973-9.
- Davis, Edward L. (2004). Encyclopedia of Contemporary Chinese Culture. Taylor & Francis Ebooks. ISBN 978-1-134-54953-5.
- Ford, Stacilee (2008). Mabel Cheung Yuen-Ting's An Autumn's Tale: A Cultural Janus. Hong Kong University Press. ISBN 978-962-209-894-7.
- Fu, Poshek (2008). The Cinema of Hong Kong: History, Arts, Identity. Cambridge University Press. ISBN 978-0-521-77602-8.
- Hammond, Wilkins (1996). Sex and Zen and a Bullet in the Head. Prentice Hall & IBD. ISBN 978-0-684-80341-8.
- Jones, Stephen (2000). The Essential Monster Movie Guide: A Century of Creature Features on Film, TV, and Video. Watson-Guptill Publications. ISBN 978-0-8230-7936-0.
- Kam, Tan See (2016). Tsui Hark's Peking Opera Blues. Hong Kong University Press. ISBN 978-988-8208-86-9.
- Martin, Fran (2010). Backward Glances. Duke University Press Books. ISBN 978-0-8223-9263-7.
- Nochimson, Martha (2007). Dying to Belong: Gangster Movies in Hollywood and Hong Kong. John Wiley & Sons. ISBN 978-1-4051-6370-5.
- Rowan, Terry (2015). World War II Goes to the Movies & Television Guide. Lulu.com. ISBN 978-1-105-58602-6.
- Schroeder, Andrew (2004). Tsui Hark's Zu: Warriors from the Magic Mountain. Hong Kong University Press. ISBN 978-962-209-651-6.
- Shin, Chi-Yun (2014). East Asian Film Noir: Transnational Encounters and Intercultural Dialogue. I.B.Tauris. ISBN 978-1-78076-009-4.
- Stokes, Lisa Odham (2009). Peter Ho-sun Chan's "He's a Woman, She's a Man". Hong Kong University Press. ISBN 978-962-209-970-8.
- Teo, Stephen (2007). Director in Action: Johnnie To and the Hong Kong Action Film. Hong Kong University Press. ISBN 978-962-209-839-8.
- Ursini, James (2006). The Modern Amazons: Warrior Women On-Screen. Limelight Editions. ISBN 978-0-87910-327-9.
- Xiao, Zhiwei (2002). Encyclopedia of Chinese Film. Taylor & Francis Ebooks. ISBN 978-1-134-74554-8.
- Yang, Jeff (2003). Once Upon a Time in China. James Bennett Pty Ltd. ISBN 978-0-7434-4817-8.
