= Public Toilet (film) =

2002 South Korean-Hong Kong-Japanese film by Fruit Chan

- Korean poster
- Directed by: Fruit Chan
- Written by: Fruit Chan; Lam Kee-To
- Produced by: Jeong Tae-sung; Radium Cheung
- Starring: Tsuyoshi Abe
- Cinematography: Henry Chung; Lam Wah-Chuen; Wong Man-wan
- Edited by: Fruit Chan (as Tin Sam-Fat)
- Music by: Jo Seong-woo
- Production companies: Nicetop Independent Ltd. Digital Nega
- Release dates: 29 November 2002 (South Korea); 7 August 2003 (Hong Kong)
- Running time: 102 minutes
- Countries: South Korea; Hong Kong; Japan
- Languages: Korean; Cantonese

Public Toilet (Chinese: 人民公廁; Jyutping: jan4 man4 gung1 cak1) is a 2002 film by Hong Kong director Fruit Chan, his first in digital format.

== Plot ==
The story revolves around a Beijing man, "Dong-dong", who was born in a public toilet. To look for his past, he searches lavatories around the world.

== Cast ==
- Tsuyoshi Abe – Dong Dong
- Ma Zhe – Tony
- Pietero Diletti – Stone
- Jang Hyuk – Kim
- Zo In-sung – Cho
- Kim Yang-hie – Ocean Girl
- Jo Kuk – Jo
- Sam Lee – Sam
- Oh Se-jeong

== Production ==
Chan was inspired by the terrible quality of public toilets in mainland China while filming Durian Durian (2000), which served as the concept for Public Toilet.

Chan shot digital video for the film at the request of the investor, Digital Nega.
