= Ivy Ho =

Hong Kong screenwriter and film director

- Born: August 15, 1958 (age 67); Macau
- Years active: 1996 – present
- Awards: Hong Kong Film Awards – Best Screenplay; 1997 Comrades, Almost a Love Story; 2002 July Rhapsody Golden Bauhinia Awards – Best Screenplay; 1996 Comrades, Almost a Love Story Hong Kong Film Critics Society Awards – Best Screenplay; 2008 Claustrophobia; 2010 Crossing Hennessy Golden Horse Awards – Best Original Screenplay; 2002 July Rhapsody

Chinese name
- Traditional Chinese: 岸西
- Simplified Chinese: 岸西
Transcriptions

Ivy Ho Sai-Hong (Chinese: 岸西, born 15 August 1958) is a Hong Kong screenwriter and film director.

Ho's work has received high critical acclaim in Hong Kong. Perry Lam of Muse magazine wrote, 'As a writer, Ho excels as a miniaturist. Whether they are the mainlanders trying to survive and prosper in Hong Kong in 甜蜜蜜 (Comrades: Almost a Love Story) or the middle-aged school teacher trying to do the right thing in 男人四十 (July Rhapsody), the characters she creates are keenly observed, psychologically acute portraits. Her tone is intimate and confessional. The many piquant details her stories contain give her characters and the movies in which they appear a solid foothold in reality.'

== Filmography ==
=== Director ===
Year	Title	Starring
2008	Claustrophobia 親密	Karena Lam, Ekin Cheng, Andy Hui
2009	Crossing Hennessy 月滿軒尼詩	Jacky Cheung, Tang Wei, Danny Lee Sau-Yin, Paw Hee-Ching, Maggie Cheung Ho-Yee, Andy On
2014	Two For The Night	Derek Tsang, Bonnie Xian, Ai Wai, Shaun Tam

=== Story ===
Year	Title
1999	Gorgeous 玻璃樽
2006	2 Become 1 天生一對
2008	Claustrophobia 親密

=== Writer ===
Year	Title
1986	Silent Love 聽不到的說話
1996	Comrades, Almost a Love Story 甜蜜蜜
1996	The Age of Miracles
1998	Anna Magdalena 安娜瑪德蓮娜
2000	And I Hate You So
2001	The Accidental Spy 特務迷城
2002	July Rhapsody 男人四十
2003	Jade Goddess of Mercy
2005	Divergence 三岔口
2008	Linger 蝴蝶飛
2008	Claustrophobia 親密
2009	Crossing Hennessy 月滿軒尼詩

== Awards and nominations ==
=== Awards ===
Year	Award	Category	Film	Result
1997	16th Hong Kong Film Awards	Best Screenplay	Comrades: Almost a Love Story	Won
1997	Golden Bauhinia Awards	Best Screenplay	Comrades: Almost a Love Story	Won
2002	Golden Horse Awards	Best Screenplay	July Rhapsody	Won
2002	21st Hong Kong Film Awards	Best Screenplay	July Rhapsody	Won
2008	15th Hong Kong Film Critics Society Awards	Best Screenplay	Claustrophobia	Won
2008	15th Hong Kong Film Critics Society Awards	Film of Merit	Claustrophobia	Won
2009	28th Hong Kong Film Awards	Best Screenplay	Claustrophobia	Nominated
2009	28th Hong Kong Film Awards	Best New Director	Claustrophobia	Nominated
2010	17th Hong Kong Film Critics Society Awards	Best Screenplay	Crossing Hennessy	Won
2010	17th Hong Kong Film Critics Society Awards	Film of Merit	Crossing Hennessy	Won
2011	30th Hong Kong Film Awards	Best Screenplay	Crossing Hennessy	Nominated
2011	30th Hong Kong Film Awards	Best New Director	Crossing Hennessy	Nominated

Awards
Preceded by Chan Man Keung for Summer Snow	Hong Kong Film Awards for Best Screenplay; 1997 for Comrades: Almost a Love Story	Succeeded by Raymond To for The Mad Phoenix
Preceded by Chan Man Keung for Summer Snow	Golden Bauhinia Awards for Best Screenplay; 1997 for Comrades: Almost a Love Story	Succeeded by Wai Ka-Fai, Matt Chow, Szeto Kam-Yuen for Too Many Ways to Be No. 1
Preceded by Fruit Chan for Durian Durian	Hong Kong Film Awards for Best Screenplay; 2002 for July Rhapsody	Succeeded by Alan Mak, Felix Chong for Infernal Affairs
Preceded by Fruit Chan for Durian Durian	Golden Horse Awards for Best Original Screenplay; 2002 for July Rhapsody	Succeeded by Yau Nai-Hoi, Au Kin-Yee for PTU
Preceded by Wai Ka-Fai, Au Kin-Yee for Mad Detective	Hong Kong Film Critics Society Awards for Best Screenplay; 2008 for Claustrophobia	Succeeded by TBD
