= The Accidental Spy =

2001 Hong Kong film by Teddy Chan

- Film poster

Chinese name
- Traditional Chinese: 特務迷城
- Simplified Chinese: 特务迷城
Transcriptions
Standard Mandarin
- Hanyu Pinyin: Tè Wù Mí Chéng
Yue: Cantonese
- Jyutping: Dak6 Mou6 Mai4 Sing4
- Directed by: Teddy Chan
- Written by: Ivy Ho
- Produced by: Jackie Chan; Raymond Chow
- Starring: Jackie Chan; Eric Tsang; Vivian Hsu; Wu Hsing-kuo; Scott Adkins
- Cinematography: Horace Wong; William Yim
- Edited by: Kwong Chi-leung
- Music by: Peter Kam; Michael Wandmacher
- Production companies: Golden Harvest; GH Pictures
- Distributed by: Golden Harvest
- Release date: 18 January 2001
- Running time: 108 minutes
- Country: Hong Kong
- Languages: Cantonese; English; Mandarin; Korean; Turkish
- Box office: HK$30.5 million

The Accidental Spy (特務迷城) is a 2001 Hong Kong martial arts action film directed by Teddy Chan, produced by Jackie Chan and Raymond Chow, and starring Jackie Chan. Filming took place in Seoul, Hong Kong, Cappadocia and Istanbul. Most of the dialogue is in English, particularly between characters of different nationalities.

The film was nominated for the Best Action Choreography, Best Editing, Best Visual Effects and Best Sound Design at the 21st Hong Kong Film Awards, and won in former two categories. It was also nominated the Best Action Choreography in the 38th Golden Horse Awards.

== Plot ==
A reporter covers a story in an Anatolian village where many people have seemingly died of pneumonia while a team of scientists try to find a cure. They are attacked and killed by a terrorist group disguised as farmers. Days later, a former North Korean spy shows up at the South Korean embassy in Istanbul.

Meanwhile, in Hong Kong, Buck Yuen, an exercise equipment salesman, shoots to fame after inadvertently foiling a bank robbery. That night, a stranger, Manny Liu, approaches Yuen and says that he is searching for men around Yuen's age and description on behalf of a terminally ill Korean man, Park Won-sung, who hopes to find his long-lost son.

Yuen agrees and meets Park in a military hospital in Seoul, as well as Carmen, a reporter. After saving Park from thugs, he accepts Park's offer to play a game: if he wins, he gets everything Park has left behind for his real son; if he loses, he will still have fun. Park dies soon after. Yuen receives a crucifix and goes to the grave of Park's wife where he scatters Park's ashes and finds the message "wait for me" on the tombstone. After leaving the cemetery with Carmen, the duo are attacked by the same thugs earlier but manage to escape. Yuen later figures out that the message corresponds to the phone number of a bank in Istanbul.

Yuen goes to Istanbul and uses the crucifix, which turns out to be a stamp, to open a safe deposit box. After leaving the bank, he encounters robbers trying to grab his briefcase full of money, but the leader of robbers doesn't find "the thing" which he wants. Yuen fends off the robbers until the police show up. While touring Istanbul, Yuen meets a woman, Yong, who has "wait for me" embroidered on her scarf. She arranges to meet him at a later time to tell him where she got the scarf.

Yuen visits a Turkish bath, where he gets attacked by thugs demanding that he hands over "the thing". After a chase through the streets, Yuen finally escapes but shows up late for his meeting with Yong. Just then, Carmen and her colleague Philip approach Yuen and reveal that they are actually CIA agents. "The thing" is the Anthrax II, a biological weapon deadlier than anthrax and has already killed many people in Anatolia. Yuen also learns that Lee Sang Zen, a crime lord, wants to buy the Anthrax II and had sent Yong to get close to Yuen to gather intel.

Yuen meets Yong, who confirms she is working for Zen. Shortly after, they are captured by thugs and taken to the Anatolian village. While the thugs are beating up Yuen to force him to reveal where the Anthrax II is, Zen sends mercenaries to attack the village and kill all the thugs. In the ensuing chaos, Yuen escapes with Yong on a makeshift raft and they are eventually picked up by Zen. Yuen learns that Yong is a drug addict enslaved by Zen. Zen offers Yuen a new deal: more money and Yong's freedom in exchange for the Anthrax II.

Yuen recalls there was a bible in the safe deposit box so he goes to a nearby church and meets a priest who knows Park. The priest leads him to the basement where Park stayed. There, Yuen finds two vials of Anthrax II and a note saying "game over". Yuen then reluctantly hands over the Anthrax II to Zen in exchange for Yong. Later, it turns out that Zen had double-crossed Yuen by giving Yong a fatal dose of drugs. After Yong dies, Yuen is arrested but Carmen and Philip bail him out. Carmen, feeling sorry for Yong's death, secretly tells Yuen that the CIA is meeting Zen the next day to discuss buying the Anthrax II from him.

Yuen tries to stop Zen at the airport, leading to a chase on the roads and through the streets. Although Yuen manages to get the Anthrax II, Zen's car is stuck to the rear of a tanker, which catches fire. Zen blows up by the fireball when he going to kills Yuen. The tanker has to keep moving or else it will explode. After Yuen saves the driver and his son, the tanker falls off the edge of an unused bridge and explodes. Yuen jumps out of the tanker before it blows up, swings down while holding on to the plastic bridge barrier, rolls down a slope and passes out due to the injuries he sustained. Manny Liu appears in a helicopter, searches Yuen for the Anthrax II, finds it and apparently leaves Yuen to die.

When Yuen regains consciousness in hospital later, he learns from Liu that his entire adventure was actually a CIA mission arranged to be performed by him as an informal, non-official agent: an "accidental spy". He was chosen because of his background as an orphan, his sharp intuition, and excellent fighting skills. In a post-credits scene, Yuen, now officially a spy, delivers a briefcase to a drug dealer in Italy and tips off the police to arrest him.

== Cast ==
- Jackie Chan as Buck Yuen
- Eric Tsang as Manny Liu
- Vivian Hsu as Yong
- Wu Hsing-kuo as Lee Sang Zen
- Kim Min as Carmen
- Joh Young-kwon as Park Won-jung
- Alfred Cheung as Park's lawyer
- Lillian Ho as Candice
- Cheung Tat-ming as Stan
- Anthony Rene Jones as Philip Ashley
- Scott Adkins as Lee's bodyguard / Turkish thug leader

== Soundtrack ==
Track listing

No.	Title	Artist	Length
1.	"身不由己"	Jackie Chan, Mavis Fan	4:30
2.	"一路上"	Jacky Cheung	3:56
3.	"捉迷藏"	Cheung	3:54
4.	"我们一起逃"	Peter Kam	4:07
5.	"主题音乐"	Kam	3:17
6.	"The Robbery"	Kam	4:25
7.	"Danger in the Hospital"	Kam	2:33
8.	"The Game Begins"	Kam	2:30
9.	"The Bath House"	Kam	2:21
10.	"The Market and White Clothes"	Kam	3:00
11.	"Fishing Village Sword Fight & the Pier"	Kam	5:15
12.	"Worst Day of My Life"	Kam	2:25
13.	"Destiny's Choice & in God's Hand"	Kam	2:50
14.	"Showdown"	Kam	5:11
15.	"The Oil Tank 1"	Kam	1:58
16.	"The Oil Tank 2"	Kam	4:53
17.	"The Brider"	Kam	4:47
18.	"决战迷城"	Kam	3:58
19.	"极度冒险"	Kam	3:49

== Production and release ==
Produced at a budget of HK$200 million, the film grossed only HK$30 million during its theatrical run in Hong Kong despite being Hong Kong's third biggest domestic release of the year. The Accidental Spy is the last film Jackie Chan film produced under Golden Harvest after some 22 films the production company has worked on with Chan.

== Dimension Films version ==
Dimension Films acquired the international distribution rights to the film outside of Asia. Like many Jackie Chan films distributed by Disney, scenes were cut, foreign dialogue was dubbed, and the music score was changed. Parts of the plot were also changed, including the Anthrax II becoming "Opio Maxa" a new and more potent form of opium.

The film holds a 25% "rotten" rating on Rotten Tomatoes based on eight reviews.

== Home media ==
The film was first released on DVD by Universe Laser in Hong Kong. The release contains a non-anamorphic picture and a "making of" feature section. On 19 March 2009, Kam & Ronson released a remastered DVD with an anamorphic picture, 5.1 and DTS sound, but with no special features.

The film was released on Blu-ray on 4 May 2009.

== Legacy ==
The scene of Yuen disguising himself by wrapping himself in a white cloth to escape from the thugs was reproduced in the 2011 Bollywood movie Thank You, wherein Akshay Kumar's character also hides by twisting hanging materials around himself.

== Awards and nominations ==
- 21st Hong Kong Film Awards (2002)
  - Won: Best Action Choreography (Tung Wei)
  - Won: Best Film Editing (Kwong Chi-leung)
  - Nomination: Best Sound Design (Kinson Tsang)
  - Nomination: Best Visual Effects

== See also ==
- Jackie Chan filmography
- List of Hong Kong films
