= Jacqueline Pang =

Hong Kong radio and television host

Jacqueline Pang Ching
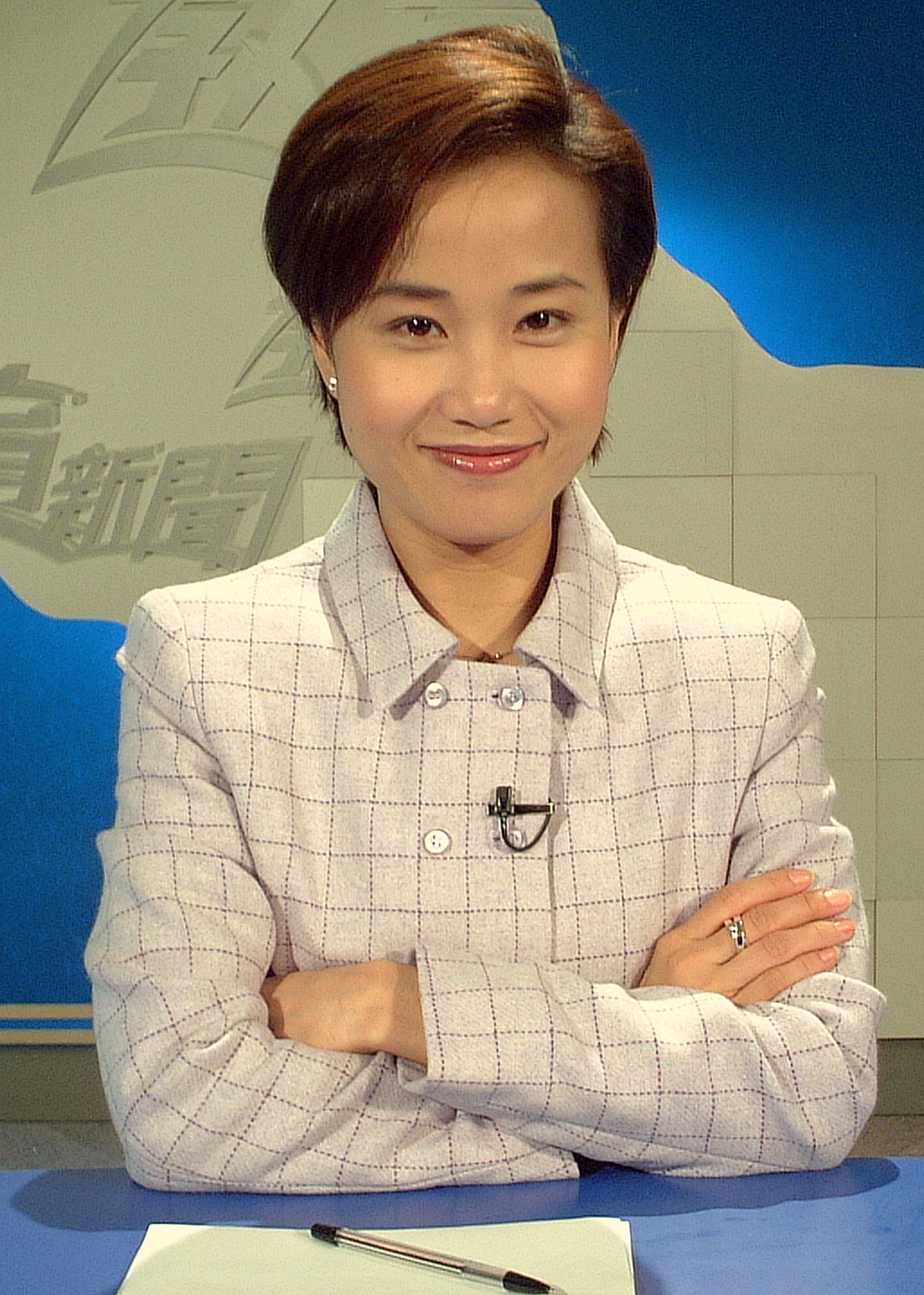
- Born: 彭家敏; 27 August 1973 (age 52); Hong Kong
- Other names: Peng Qing, Pang Ching
- Occupation: Radio Host & TV Compere

Jacqueline Pang (born Pang Ka-man, 27 August 1973) is a Hong Kong live television compère/host, interviewer, author, and has been a radio announcer and DJ on RTHK (Radio Television Hong Kong) since 1998. Pang is fluent in English and Putonghua, in addition to her native Cantonese.

== Personal life ==
Born on 27 August 1973 in Hong Kong to Fujian-ese parents of Vietnamese origin, Pang was educated in Toronto, Ontario, Canada, where her parents now reside. She has one younger sister who participated in the Miss Hong Kong Pageant of 1997. Pang also worked briefly as an airline hostess at Virgin Airways before embarking on her career in Hong Kong broadcasting.

In 2000, Pang married a businessman, but divorced him in 2006. She has one son. Pang was interviewed by local newspaper Ming Pao in Chinese about her personal feelings.

== Career ==
=== Radio ===
In 1998, Pang began working for government public-broadcaster Radio Television Hong Kong (RTHK) Radio 2, which broadcasts in Cantonese with programmes aimed at youth, entertainment and popular music. Having a brief background as a DJ in Toronto, Pang trained for six months at RTHK and became a very popular broadcast DJ and announcer.

In 1999, Pang earned a main character role in the 32-episode Radio RTHK historical drama The Book and the Sword. She became noted for her vocal changes in taking on a character and was sought by dubbing studios and for commercial advertisements. Pang made appearances on RTHK's Teen Power, coaching prospective DJs on how to use vocal changes to emote.

Pang was asked by director Alan K.K. Yip to sing a Cantonese-version of the theme for a Korean drama, "A Wrongly Secured Love" (錯落的深情), which rose to the No. 12 position on the Cantonese Golden Songs Pop Chart in March 2003. Pang released a few records and had other Top 20 songs including "Waiting For Your Love" (等你的愛) sung with Chan Kin Chong (陳敬創).

In May 2004, Pang moved from the midnight music programme Late Mother, Late Father to the long-running 06:00–10:00 weekday programme Morning Suite (replacing Candy Che Suk-Mui) and also co-hosted the Saturday 12:00–14:00 Cantonese Top 20 Pop Chart (中文歌曲龍虎榜), increasing her on-air exposure.

Despite moving to television news in March 2008, Pang maintains a presence on RTHK Radio 2. She continued to co-host Cantonese Top 20 Pop Chart until July 2009, filled-in for her Morning Suite replacement on 1 October 2008, and made numerous guest-hosting appearances on other RTHK radio programmes. In October 2009, Pang began a new Sunday afternoon radio programme Lassies and Nerds (中女宅男殺很大) with co-host Tsang Chi Ho (曾志豪), which examines the social needs of those who are single and over the age of 30 in Hong Kong.

=== Master of ceremonies ===
Known as a very animated hostess for live stage, TV shows and special events, Pang also performs master of ceremonies (MC) duties at high-society private parties. Pang lectures on public speaking at the HK Productivity Council and makes appearances as a judge at the Master-of-Ceremony Competitions.

Pang is noted for her hosting of the popular annual environmental programme, The Solar Project, an RTHK combined live radio-and-TV stage production, from 2001 to 2007. Her last "Let's Go" concert by RTHK was held in Hong Kong in conjunction with TVB.

=== Television ===
Pang started in television in 2001 with segments on RTHK's education channel, ETV, including co-hosting "Education News" and "Inter-School Quiz". She co-hosted a number of televised awards shows and events, including the 21st Hong Kong Film Awards (2002), the 4th Global Chinese Music Awards (2004), benefits for Save China's Tigers (2005) and for victims of the 2008 Sichuan earthquake, and Hong Kong's 2008 New Year's celebrations. She is noted for hosting the annual televised production The Solar Project.

From October 2007 to February 2008, Pang co-hosted a thrice-daily 3-minute video news segment 'Witty Banter' for PCCW's 'NOW! News' Channel 332. In March, Pang was promoted to senior anchor for the channel's weekday morning news programme (09:30–12:30). Also in March 2008, Pang was invited to host NOW!TV's Dim Sum TV channel current-affairs programme Talk of Fame (點心名人榜). Pang hosted many early episodes, showing her ability to research and interview a wide variety of subjects.

=== Author, playwright and columnist ===
Pang's first book is Yi Zhong Ai Qi Duan Qing (一種愛 七段情', literally translated as 'One Kind of Love but Seven Situations'), a collection of gay and lesbian love stories. It was released on 18 July 2007 at the Hong Kong Book Fair. A second paperback titled 中女挑宅男 is a collection of short stories recounted from her popular RTHK radio programme Lassies and Nerds, published at the end of 2010. In July 2011, Pang released another Chinese book titled 中女解毒 (or Women in Detoxification) in parallel with a stage play of the same name, in which Pang starred. A follow-up book was released at the 2012 Hong Kong Book Fair.

Pang is a regular contributor to weekday (Hong Kong) Chinese-language newspaper AM0730. Her column, running on Tuesdays and Thursdays, is titled "Zhong Nui Wan Sui" (Happy Zhong Girls). Pang also contributed articles in English to the Local section of the free daily newspaper The Standard. These articles echoed her Chinese-language blog. The last of Pang's well-received short articles was printed on 25 October 2010. A 2011 interview about her personal life struggles is also in print by The Standard.

== Detention ==
On 12 January 2007, Jacqueline Pang Ching was detained (with several more-prominent RTHK DJs) by Hong Kong's Independent Commission Against Corruption (ICAC) for purportedly being involved in a fraud by a superior involving claims of reimbursement of tens of thousands of Hong Kong dollars between 2002 and 2003. Due to lack of any conclusive evidence, Pang was released, and returned to host Morning Suite.

== See also ==
- 21st Hong Kong Film Awards
