= Lonely Fifteen =

1982 Hong Kong film by David Lai

- Film poster
- Directed by: David Lai
- Screenplay by: Manfred Wong
- Produced by: Johnny Mak Tong-hung; Terence Chang
- Starring: Becky Lam; Irene Wan
- Cinematography: Tong Bo-Sang; Bob Thompson
- Music by: Michael Lai
- Production companies: Pearl City Films; Johnny Mak Production
- Release date: 20 April 1982 (Hong Kong)
- Running time: 96 minutes
- Country: Hong Kong
- Language: Cantonese
- Box office: >HK$10 million

Lonely Fifteen (靚妹仔, Leng mooi jai) is a 1982 Hong Kong film directed by David Lai and starring Becky Lam, Irene Wan, and Peter Mak Tak-woh. It was the first film produced by producer Johnny Mak Tong Hung (麥當雄) after leaving Rediffusion Television to enter the film industry. The story tells of several underage girls who run away from home and fall into prostitution, losing themselves in the comfort of love and material pleasure. This film is one of the representative works of the Hong Kong New Wave.

Released in Hong Kong on April 21, 1982, the film grossed over HK$10 million in its first three weeks, ranking eighth for the year. It was nominated for eight awards at the 2nd Hong Kong Film Awards, including Best Film and Best Director, with 17-year-old Becky Lam ultimately winning the Best Actress award.

== Cast ==
- Becky Lam
- Irene Wan
- Mak Tak-who
- John Au
- Chung-Lung Chan
- Hsing-Tang Chen
- Chu Fung Cheng
- Ging Cheung
- Kar Lok Chin
- Shing-Choi Chu
- Yee Chui
- Shiu-Mei Fung
- Kwok Wing Ha
- Yue-Keung Ho
- Yu Lung Hsiao
- Siu-Fong Lai
- Wan Lee
- Mei-King Leung
- Chi Ling
- Ying Hong Luk
- Wang Ban Poon
- Bo Sha
- Ching-Mei Sham
- Pui-Fong So
- Sam Sorono
- Kwai-Hing Suen
- Kam Bo Wong
- Manfred Wong
- Mei-Ling Wu
- Koon-Jip Yip
- Sau-yee Yung

== Reception ==
=== Awards ===
2nd Hong Kong Film Awards

- Won: Best Actress - Becky Lam
- Nominated: Best Film
- Nominated: Best Director - David Lai
- Nominated: Best Screenplay - Manfred Wong
- Nominated: Best New Performer - Irene Wan
- Nominated: Best Cinematography - Tong Bo-Sang Bob Thompson
- Nominated: Best Film Editing - Mak Family Editing Group
