= Claustrophobia (2008 film) =

2008 Hong Kong film by Ivy Ho

- Film poster
- Directed by: Ivy Ho
- Written by: Ivy Ho
- Produced by: Cary Cheng; William Kong; Yee Chung-Man
- Starring: Karena Lam; Ekin Cheng
- Cinematography: Mark Lee Ping Bin
- Edited by: Kong Chi-leung
- Music by: Anthony Chue
- Production companies: Irresistible Films; The Film Development Fund of Hong Kong; Runaway Films; Runaway Films; Mega Profit Creation
- Distributed by: Edko Films
- Release dates: 26 October 2008 (HKAFF); 12 February 2009 (Hong Kong)
- Running time: 100 minutes
- Country: Hong Kong
- Language: Cantonese

Claustrophobia (traditional Chinese: 親密; simplified Chinese: 亲密) is a 2008 Hong Kong romantic drama film written and directed by Ivy Ho in her directorial debut, and starring Karena Lam and Ekin Cheng.

== Synopsis ==
Pearl (Karena Lam) has quietly fallen in love with her boss Tom (Ekin Cheng), who's married with a family. Without warning, Tom asks Pearl to interview for another job. Wounded, Pearl demands that Tom terminate her. The gauntlet has been thrown down. In a space as small, crowded and claustrophobic as the office, love doesn't grow - it incubates and breeds, like a virus.

== Cast ==
- Karena Lam as Pearl
- Ekin Cheng as Tom
- Felix Lok as Karl
- Derek Tsang as John
- Chucky Woo as Jewel
- Eric Tsang as Dr. Chiu
- Andy Hui as Ken
- Siu Miu-yin as Dr. Chiu's nurse
- Cary Cheng as Dr. Chiu's patient
- Ben Wong as Michael
- Dhillion Harit Singh as Lift passenger
- Zhou Ji-cheng as Lift passenger
- D.S.F. Chow as Pier hand
- Cheung Yat-fei as Man at restaurant
- Lulu Wong as Girl at restaurant
- Pancy Chan as Yvonne
- Allie Poon as Bianca
- Kong Ka-yin as Rollerblading girl
- Choy Ka-chai as Rollerblading guy
- Wong Kin-ko as Woman in conference room
- Yeung Chiu-hoi as Man in TV commercial
- Iris Ngai as Girl in TV commercial

== Release ==
- Tokyo International Film Festival 23 October 2008
- Hong Kong Asian Film Festival 26 October 2008
- Berlin International Film Festival 10 February 2009
- Hong Kong Wide Release 12 February 2009
- San Francisco International Film Festival May 2009

== Awards and nominations ==
Awards and nominations
Ceremony	Category	Recipient	Outcome
28th Hong Kong Film Awards	Best Screenplay	Ivy Ho	Nominated
28th Hong Kong Film Awards	Best Actress	Karena Lam	Nominated
28th Hong Kong Film Awards	Best New Director	Ivy Ho	Nominated
15th Hong Kong Film Critics Society Awards	Best Screenplay	Ivy Ho	Won
15th Hong Kong Film Critics Society Awards	Film of Merit	Claustrophobia	Won
