= Love on a Diet =

2001 Hong Kong film by Johnnie To and Wai Ka-fai

Love on A Diet
- Film poster
- Traditional Chinese: 瘦身男女
- Simplified Chinese: 瘦身男女
- Hanyu Pinyin: Shòu Shēn Nán Nǚ
- Jyutping: Sau3 San1 Naam4 Neoi2
- Directed by: Johnnie To; Wai Ka-fai
- Written by: Wai Ka-fai; Yau Nai-hoi
- Produced by: Johnnie To; Wai Ka-fai
- Starring: Andy Lau; Sammi Cheng
- Cinematography: Cheng Siu-Keung
- Edited by: Law Wing-cheung; Wong Wing-ming
- Music by: Cacine Wong
- Production companies: One Hundred Years of Film; Milkyway Image
- Distributed by: China Star Entertainment Group
- Release date: 21 June 2001 (Hong Kong)
- Running time: 95 minutes
- Country: Hong Kong
- Languages: Cantonese; Japanese; English
- Box office: HK$40,435,886

Love on a Diet (Chinese: 瘦身男女 - literally "Slimming Men and Women") is a 2001 Hong Kong romantic comedy film produced and directed by Johnnie To and Wai Ka-fai, starring Andy Lau and Sammi Cheng.

The film reunites Lau and Cheng, who last paired up in 2000's Needing You.... For their roles, both actors play obese characters and had to wear fatsuits with prosthetic makeup.

== Plot ==
Mini Mo (Sammi Cheng) is a Hong Kong resident living in Japan. She has depression, low self-esteem and a binge eating disorder – the result which sees her has extreme obesity. A suicide attempt causes her to meet Fatso (Andy Lau), a Hong Kong salesman working in Japan who is also obese.

Mini sticks with Fatso everywhere, and although initially vexed by Mini, Fatso discovers the reason behind her depression. Mini cannot forget her former boyfriend, Kurokawa, who is now a world-famous pianist. Ten years ago, the two had pledged to meet at the foot of Yokohama Marine Tower on the night of their break-up. Mini is fearful of meeting Kurokawa in her present size. Touched by her story and her sweet nature, Fatso promises to whip her back into shape.

After trying desperate means of losing weight (such as swallowing tapeworms and exercising to Dance Dance Revolution), Mini finally sheds pounds. But Fatso finds his funds running low. To earn enough to finance Mini's weight-loss programs, he opens a boxing gig on the streets allowing on-lookers to punch him to vent their pent-up frustrations. He next enrolls Mini on an expensive weight-loss program, which proves to be very successful. Mini regains her former slim and pretty look.

On the night of her reunion with Kurokawa, Fatso drops Mini off at Tokyo Tower and she meets up with former beau under the gazing eyes of the local media. The pair are interviewed by a local network, but Mini notices another broadcast featuring Fatso's street boxing gig. She finally realizes how much Fatso has sacrificed himself for her and is moved to tears. Turning to apologize to Kurokawa, she leaves hastily.

Months later, Mini publishes a bestseller on dieting, and finds a slimmed-down Fatso carrying her book in a park. The two kiss, promising never to leave each other again.

== Cast ==
- Andy Lau as Fatso
- Sammi Cheng as Mini Mo
- Wong Tin-lam as Fatso's fat friend
- Lam Suet as Bun Man
- Rikiya Kurokawa as Kurokawa
- Kenji Sato as Fatso's boxing customer
- Asuka Higuchi as Ms. Kudo
- Wong Mei-fan as Radio DJ
- Po Ming-nam as Cocaine Ken
- Hung Wai-leung as Fatso's fat friend
- Cheung Chi-ping as Fatso's fat friend
- Cheng Kam-cheung as Fatso's fat friend
- Lo Ching-ting

== Awards and nominations ==
Awards and nominations
Ceremony	Category	Recipient	Outcome
21st Hong Kong Film Awards	Best Film	Love on a Diet	Nominated
21st Hong Kong Film Awards	Best Director	Johnnie To, Wai Ka-fai	Nominated
21st Hong Kong Film Awards	Best Actor	Andy Lau	Nominated
21st Hong Kong Film Awards	Best Actress	Sammi Cheng	Nominated
21st Hong Kong Film Awards	Best Screenplay	Wai Ka-fai, Yau Nai-hoi	Nominated
21st Hong Kong Film Awards	Best Original Film Song	Song: Beautiful for Life (終身美麗) Composer: Keith Chan Fai-young; Lyricist: Lin Xi; Singer: Sammi Cheng	Won
38th Golden Horse Awards	Best Actor	Andy Lau	Nominated
7th Golden Bauhinia Awards	Best Actor	Andy Lau	Nominated
7th Golden Bauhinia Awards	Best Actress	Sammi Cheng	Nominated

== Trivia ==
- Fatso's car is a Mitsubishi Minica Toppo
