= Becky Lam =

Hong Kong actress

- Chinese: 林碧琪
- Born: 1966 (age 59–60)
- Other name: Lam Bik-Kei
- Occupation: Actress

Becky Lam (Chinese: 林碧琪) is a Hong Kong actress. She won the Hong Kong Film Award for Best Actress at the 2nd Hong Kong Film Awards.

== Filmography ==
- 1982 Lonely Fifteen - Becky

== Awards ==
- 1983 Hong Kong Film Award for Best Actress for Lonely Fifteen
