= July Rhapsody =

2002 Hong Kong film by Ann Hui

July Rhapsody 男人四十
- DVD cover
- Traditional Chinese: 男人四十
- Directed by: Ann Hui
- Written by: Ivy Ho
- Produced by: Ann Hui; Derek Yee
- Starring: Jacky Cheung; Anita Mui; Karena Lam; Shaun Tam
- Cinematography: Kwan Pun Leung; Thomas Yeung
- Edited by: Eric Kwong
- Music by: Tommy Wai
- Production company: FilmKo Pictures
- Distributed by: FilmKo Pictures Distribution
- Release date: 14 March 2002
- Running time: 103 minutes
- Country: Hong Kong
- Language: Cantonese
- Box office: HK$4,874,951

July Rhapsody (Chinese: 男人四十) is a 2002 Hong Kong drama film directed by Ann Hui and produced by Ann Hui and Derek Yee. This was Anita Mui's final film appearance before her death from cervical cancer in 2003.

== Overview ==
The film's Chinese title Chinese: 男人四十 literally translates to Man, 40. Its alternative title is Laam yan sei sap. The film explores midlife crisis, marriage, and teacher-student seduction.

== Plot ==
Lam Yiu-kwok (Jacky Cheung), a Hong Kong secondary school teacher, is facing a midlife crisis, marriage problems, and seduction by a student. He and his wife Man-ching (Anita Mui) are married, living in a modest apartment with their two sons. However, his first son Ang (Shaun Tam) is not his, but actually of his wife and Mr. Shing (Tou Chung Hua), their former teacher. When Man-ching was a student, she seduced Mr. Shing, resulting in her pregnancy with Ang. As a teacher, Yiu-kwok does not have financial success like his friends, successful businessmen and professionals who flaunt their extravagant lifestyles at reunion dinners. Mr. Shing returns to Hong Kong. Mr. Shing is old and dying and Man-ching feels obliged to spend time with her ex-lover. In school, Yiu-kwok receives flirtatious attention from Choi-lam (Karena Lam), a student from his class who has a crush on him. Yiu-kwok's resistance to his raunchy student's advances begins to weaken.

== Cast ==
- Jacky Cheung as Lam Yiu-kwok
  - Otto Wu as Young Lam Yiu-kwok
- Anita Mui as Chan Man-ching
  - Cara Chu as Young Chan Man-ching
- Karena Lam as Woo Choi-lam
- Shaun Tam as Lam On-yin
  - Ricky Kwok as Infant Lam On-yin
- Eric Kot as Wong Yui
- Tou Chung-hua as Shing Sai-nin
- Jin Hui as Lam Lui-yin
- Leung Tin as Principal Leung
- Race Wong as Mrs. Mak
- Ku Tin-nung as Yiu-kwok's former classmate
- Roddy Wong as Yiu-kwok's former classmate
- Jason Yip as Yiu-kwok's former classmate
- Simon Li as Yiu-kwok's former classmate
- Raymond Yu as Yiu-kwok's former classmate
- James Cheng as Yiu-kwok's former classmate
- Yu Sai-tang as Cho
- Alan Wong as Cho's son
- Wong Yuet-ling as Waiter
- Chan Kui-fai as P.E. teacher
- Lee Yiu-tong as Teacher
- Ng Ka-leung as Teacher
- Law Wai-yee as Teacher
- Li Chui-yee as Teacher
- Fok Bo as Teacher
- Tony Lui as Teacher
- Chan Kin-shun as Teacher
- Nakata Yuki as Japanese girl
- Chow Au-ming as Old man
- Lau Miu-ling as Filipino maid
- Lee Tung-yung as Mainland female doctor
- Cheung Lai-kwan as Tramp in tunnel
- Jonathan Lam
- Ho Tsz-kit
- Carson Fan
- William Ho
- Roy Lau
- Jason Lee
- Levan Mak
- Courtney Wu as Father
- Ko Tin Lung

== Awards and nominations ==
Awards and nominations
Ceremony	Category	Recipient	Outcome
21st Hong Kong Film Awards	Best Film	July Rhapsody	Nominated
21st Hong Kong Film Awards	Best Director	Ann Hui	Nominated
21st Hong Kong Film Awards	Best Actor	Jacky Cheung	Nominated
21st Hong Kong Film Awards	Best Actress	Anita Mui	Nominated
21st Hong Kong Film Awards	Best Supporting Actress	Karena Lam	Won
21st Hong Kong Film Awards	Best New Performer	Karena Lam	Won
21st Hong Kong Film Awards	Best Screenplay	Ivy Ho	Won
21st Hong Kong Film Awards	Best Art Direction	Man Nim-chung	Nominated
39th Golden Horse Awards	Best Feature Film	July Rhapsody	Nominated
39th Golden Horse Awards	Best Actress	Anita Mui	Nominated
39th Golden Horse Awards	Best Supporting Actress	Karena Lam	Won
39th Golden Horse Awards	Best New Performer	Karena Lam	Won
39th Golden Horse Awards	Best Original Screenplay	Ivy Ho	Won
39th Golden Horse Awards	Best Art Direction	Man Nim-chung	Nominated
39th Golden Horse Awards	Best Costume & Make-up Design	Man Nim-chung	Nominated
8th Hong Kong Film Critics Society Awards	Film of Merit	July Rhapsody	Won
6th Golden Bauhinia Awards	Best Director	Ann Hui	Nominated
6th Golden Bauhinia Awards	Best Actor	Jacky Cheung	Nominated
6th Golden Bauhinia Awards	Best Actress	Anita Mui	Nominated
6th Golden Bauhinia Awards	Best Supporting Actress	Karena Lam	Won
6th Golden Bauhinia Awards	Best Screenplay	Ivy Ho	Nominated
6th Golden Bauhinia Awards	Top Ten Chinese-language films	July Rhapsody	Won
50th International Film Festival of India	Best Actor	Jacky Cheung	Won
6th Changchun Film Festival	Best Actress	Anita Mui	Won
7th Verona Love Screens Film Festival	Best Film	July Rhapsody	Nominated
2nd Chinese Film Media Awards (Hong Kong and Taiwan)	Best Film	July Rhapsody	Nominated
2nd Chinese Film Media Awards (Hong Kong and Taiwan)	Best Director	Ann Hui	Nominated
2nd Chinese Film Media Awards (Hong Kong and Taiwan)	Best Actor	Jacky Cheung	Nominated
2nd Chinese Film Media Awards (Hong Kong and Taiwan)	Best Actress	Anita Mui	Won
HKSAR 10th Anniversary Film Awards	Best Screenplay	Ivy Ho	Nominated

== See also ==
- Summer Snow
