= Visible Secret =

2001 Hong Kong film by Ann Hui

- Theatrical poster
- Traditional Chinese: 幽靈人間
- Simplified Chinese: 幽灵人间
- Hanyu Pinyin: Yōu Líng Rén Jiān
- Jyutping: Jau1 Ling4 Jan4 Gaan1
- Directed by: Ann Hui
- Written by: Abe Kwong
- Produced by: Thomas Chung; John Chong; Solon So; Ann Hui; Abe Kwong
- Starring: Eason Chan; Shu Qi; Anthony Wong; Sam Lee; James Wong; Wayne Lai; Kara Hui; Tony Liu; Cheung Tat-ming
- Cinematography: Arthur Wong
- Edited by: Kwong Chi-leung
- Music by: Tommy Wai
- Production companies: Class Limited; Media Asia Films
- Release date: 1 June 2001
- Running time: 98 minutes
- Country: Hong Kong
- Language: Cantonese
- Box office: HK$8,876,319

Visible Secret is a 2001 Hong Kong horror comedy film, directed by Ann Hui, starring Eason Chan, Shu Qi, Anthony Wong, Sam Lee, James Wong, Wayne Lai, Kara Hui, Tony Liu and Cheung Tat-ming.

== Plot ==
Peter, a hairdresser, meets June, a nurse, at the disco one night and she becomes his girlfriend. She claims to have a spiritual "third eye" which allows her to see ghosts. As they become closer to each other, Peter starts to encounter visions of ghosts. After a vacation at a holiday resort, June befriends a boy in the neighbourhood. One day, Peter and June visit the boy at his house, and Peter is horrified to see that the boy's mother is under attack by two vicious ghosts, who are fighting for possession of her body. The boy is later found dead. Meanwhile, Peter's father commits suicide in hospital under strange circumstances.

Peter becomes suspicious of June and wants to break up with her, even when she tries to warn him that he is being targeted by a "headless ghost". When Peter's best friend, Simon, tells him that he was indeed possessed, Peter regains his trust in June and they start unraveling the mystery together by tracking down details of a horrific accident that happened at Sai Wan two decades ago. Peter's father had accidentally bumped into a man and caused the man to fall onto a railway, where he was knocked down by an incoming tram and was decapitated. The man is the "headless ghost" and he is seeking revenge on Peter and his father.

== Cast ==
- Eason Chan as Peter Wong Choi
  - Man Kin-fung as young Peter
- Shu Qi as June / Wong Siu-kam
  - Kelly Moo as young June
- Anthony Wong as Wong-lin
- Sam Lee as Simon
- James Wong as Lo Kit
- Wayne Lai as Peter's brother
- Kara Hui as Siu-kam's mother
- Tony Liu as Master Tsang
- Cheung Tat-ming as Taxi driver
- Jo Kuk as Ghost on the subway
- Perry Chan as Dicky
- Tiffany Lee as Carmen
- Rashima Maheubani as Sue
- Ho Fili as Fatso
- Yau Man-shing as Ah-kow
- Chung Yiu-shing as Little Chung
- Tammy Ting as Tat's wife
- Lo Yan-yan as Cher
- Fok Lin as Aunt San
- Janet Chang as Singing woman
- Ng Wing-han as Nurse
- Lo Pui-ho as Boy in salon A
- Kung Siu-ling as Boy's mother
- Lee Wing-yin as Sue's friend
- Lau Ho-yee as Jake's girlfriend
- Ng Tat-lap as Youngster in salon B
- Lai Hing-san as Uncle Chan
- Lee Chi-ming as Snake Head
- Li Fung as Miss Wong

== Release ==
Visible Secret was released in Hong Kong on 1 June 2001. In the Philippines, the film was released by Media Asia Films on 21 August 2003.

== See also ==
- Visible Secret 2 (2002)
