= Karena Lam =

Taiwanese actress

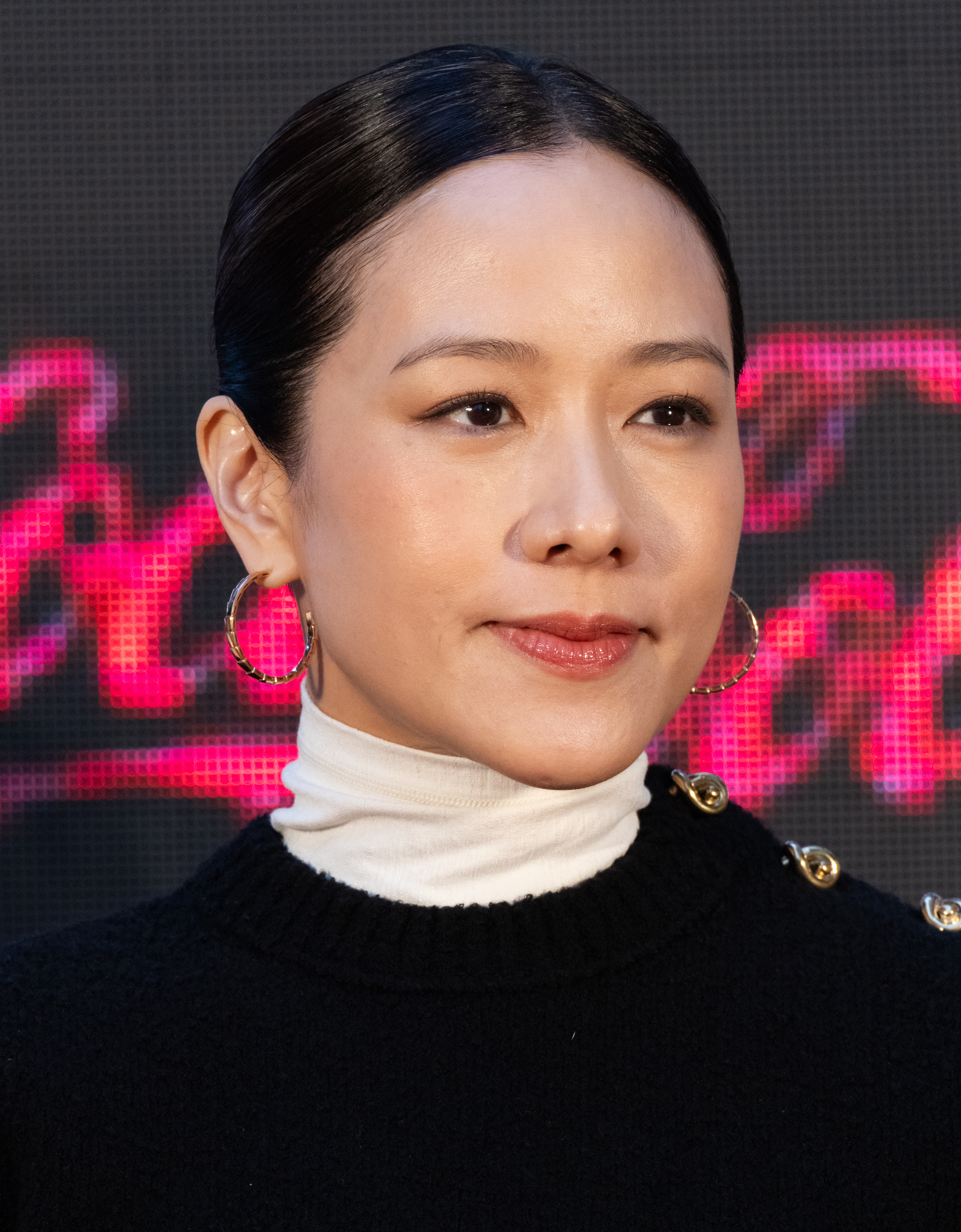
- Lam attending the 37th Tokyo International Film Festival in October 2024
- Born: 17 August 1978 (age 48); Vancouver, British Columbia, Canada
- Citizenship: Canada; Taiwan
- Education: École Philippe Gaulier
- Occupations: Actress; singer
- Years active: 1995–present
- Spouse: Steve Yuen (m. 2010; div. 2023)
- Children: 2
- Awards: Hong Kong Film Awards – Best New Performer; 2002 July Rhapsody; Best Supporting Actress; 2002 July Rhapsody Golden Bauhinia Awards – Best Supporting Actress; 2003 July Rhapsody Golden Horse Awards – Best New Performer; 2002 July Rhapsody; Best Supporting Actress; 2002 July Rhapsody; Best Actress; 2015 Zinnia Flower
- Musical career
- Origin: Taiwan
- Genres: Mandopop; Cantopop

Chinese name
- Chinese: 林嘉欣
Transcriptions
Standard Mandarin
- Hanyu Pinyin: Lín Jiāxīn
Yue: Cantonese
- Jyutping: Lam4 Gaa1 Jan1
Southern Min
- Hokkien POJ: Lîm Ka-him

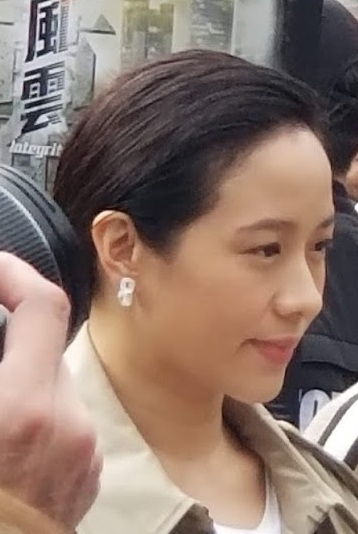
Lam at Victoria Park in Hong Kong

Karena Lam (Chinese: 林嘉欣; pinyin: Lín Jiāxīn; Jyutping: Lam4 Gaa1 Jan1; Cantonese Yale: Làm Gāyān; Pe̍h-ōe-jī: Lîm Ka-him; born 17 August 1978) is a Taiwanese Canadian actress and singer based in Taiwan and Hong Kong.

In October 1995, Lam released her debut album Karena (有點想). In 2015, she won the Best Actress award at the Golden Horse Awards for her role in Zinnia Flower, making her the first person to have won all of the following three Golden Horse acting awards: Best Lead Actress, Best Supporting Actress and Best New Performer.

== Early life and career ==
Lam was born in Vancouver, British Columbia, Canada, to a father from Hong Kong and a Taiwanese-Japanese mother. Lam studied with French pedagogue and master clown Philippe Gaulier at École Philippe Gaulier.

Lam is a Hong Kong–based actress and winner of three Golden Horse Awards. Lam's first film was Sing Kei Lok Yeuk Kui (Saturday Appointment), a 1996 Adult Thriller film directed by Sam Ho Shu-Pui.

Lam is also an artist, curator and ambassador of Le French May. As the curator of Le French May 2017 "Celebration of the Arts", she handpicked a selection of iconic French movies for this cinema programme. Exhibitions she curated include Inoue Yuichi Solo Exhibition 'Hana' (at agnes b.'s LIBRAIRIE GALERIE, Hong Kong) and Watanabe Mayumi Solo Exhibition 'Send in the Clowns' (Librairie Galerie at K11 Art Mall, Hong Kong).

== Personal life ==
Lam married Yuen Kim Wai, an advertising director, in June 2010. Lam has two daughters, Kayla (b. 2010) and Sofie (b. 2013). Lam and Yuen divorced in 2023.

== Discography ==
- Karena (1995)
- Unrequited Love (1999)
- Midinight PM 11:30 (2003)
- Dating (2004)

== Filmography ==
=== Films ===
This is a partial list of films.

Year	Title	Role	Notes/Ref.
2002	Tiramisu	Jane Chan	
2002	Inner Senses	Cheung Yan	
2002	July Rhapsody	Choy-Lam	
2003	Heroic Duo	Brenda	
2003	Truth or Dare: 6th Floor Rear Flat	Karena	
2003	The Floating Landscape	Maan	
2004	Six Strong Guys	Ding Ding	
2004	Super Model	Karena	
2004	Koma	Suen Ling	
2005	Home Sweet Home	Yim Hung	
2005	Mob Sister	Nova	
2005	It Had to Be You!	Jill	
2007	Anna & Anna	Anna/Siyu	
2007	Kidnap	Lam Hiu-yeung	
2006	Silk	Wei	
2008	Claustrophobia	Pearl	
2008	Candy Rain	Ricky	
2008	Fit Lover	Nie Bing	
2008	Happy Funeral		Cameo
2010	Lover's Discourse	Nancy	
2010	Don Quixote		
2010	Let the Wind Carry Me		
2015	Dragon Blade	Karena	
2015	Keeper of Darkness		
2015	Zinnia Flower	Min	
2016	Heaven in the Dark	Michelle Chan	
2017	The Liquidator	Wei Wei	
2019	Integrity	Shirley Kong	
2019	The White Storm 2 - Drug Lords	Fung	
2019	Declared Legally Dead	Ling	
2021	American Girl	Wang Li-li (Lily)	
2024	Daughter's Daughter	Emma	
2024	Customs Frontline	Athena Siu	

== Awards and nominations ==
Year	Award	Category	Nominated work	Result
2002	21st Hong Kong Film Awards	Best Supporting Actress	July Rhapsody	Won
2002	21st Hong Kong Film Awards	Best New Performer	July Rhapsody	Won
2002	39th Golden Horse Awards	Best Supporting Actress	July Rhapsody	Won
2002	39th Golden Horse Awards	Best New Performer	July Rhapsody	Won
2003	Golden Bauhinia Awards	Best Supporting Actress	July Rhapsody	Won
2003	22nd Hong Kong Film Awards	Best Actress	Inner Senses	Nominated
2004	23rd Hong Kong Film Awards	Best Actress	The Floating Landscape	Nominated
2005	24th Hong Kong Film Awards	Best Actress	Koma	Nominated
2006	25th Hong Kong Film Awards	Best Actress	Home Sweet Home	Nominated
2006	25th Hong Kong Film Awards	Best Supporting Actress	Mob Sister	Nominated
2008	Ming Pao Anniversary Award	Outstanding Actress in Film	Claustrophobia	Nominated
2008	45th Golden Horse Awards	Best Leading Actress	Claustrophobia	Nominated
2009	28th Hong Kong Film Awards	Best Actress	Claustrophobia	Nominated
2010	Ming Pao Anniversary Award	Outstanding Actress in Film	Lover's Discourse	Nominated
2015	52nd Golden Horse Awards	Best Leading Actress	Zinnia Flower	Won
2016	35th Hong Kong Film Awards	Best Actress	Heaven in the Dark	Nominated
2021	58th Golden Horse Awards	Best Leading Actress	American Girl	Nominated
