= Home Sweet Home (2005 film) =

2005 Hong Kong film by Soi Cheang

- Film poster
- Traditional Chinese: 怪物
- Simplified Chinese: 怪物
- Hanyu Pinyin: Guài Wù
- Jyutping: Gwaai3 Mat6
- Directed by: Cheang Pou-soi
- Written by: Szeto Kam-Yuen; Nicoll Tang
- Produced by: Lawrence Cheng; Stanley Tong; Chan Man
- Starring: Karena Lam; Shu Qi; Alex Fong; Lam Suet
- Cinematography: Wong Wing-hung
- Edited by: Angie Lam
- Music by: Raymond Wong; Tommy Wai
- Production companies: Filmko Entertainment; Shan Tung Film Distributions; China Film Co-Production Corporation
- Distributed by: Panorama Distributions
- Release date: 27 October 2005
- Running time: 93 minutes
- Country: Hong Kong
- Languages: Cantonese; Mandarin
- Box office: HK$4,552,960.00

Home Sweet Home is a 2005 Hong Kong horror film directed by Cheang Pou-soi, starring Karena Lam, Shu Qi, Alex Fong and Lam Suet.

== Plot ==
May moves into a new apartment in Hong Kong with her husband Ray and son Chi-lo. While they are moving in, Chi-lo and May see a hideous creature. They tell Ray what they have seen and he suggests moving out. However, as they have already paid a lot for their new home, May and her family decide to stay.

One day, May brings Chi-lo to a neighbour's birthday party. During this time, Chi-lo is kidnapped by the creature, which is revealed to be a deformed, insane woman who has mistaken the boy for her son. After informing the police, May and Ray begin searching the complex. In the parking garage, Ray is stabbed by the woman with a makeshift knife. Critically wounded, he is rushed to the hospital.

With her neighbours refusing to help, May is forced to continue the search alone. While searching the complex's air ducts and nearly being attacked by the woman, she falls through a vent cover leading to the outside of the complex and gets knocked out upon hitting the ground. A second attempt involves the help of a dog, which quickly picks up the woman's scent and tracks her to a rooftop. The dog scares Chi-lo and is killed by the woman, but not before it bites off one of her fingers. When May arrives, she ends up collecting the severed finger from the dog's mouth.

May then brings the finger to a police detective working on the case. Through fingerprint testing, they are able to identify the woman as one Chan Yim-hung, who lived with her husband and son Wing-man, as well as Hong Kong's poorest residents, in the same area of the apartment complex years ago when it still a squatter area. When the government tried to reclaim the area, a riot ensued and Chan's husband was killed in a subsequent explosion. Although the squatter area had been cleared, Chan had returned there with her son to continue their lives. After her son was killed by falling debris while looking for food, Chan left the area and returned some time after the new apartment was completed. By then, she had been driven insane by the loss of her son.

May decides to lure Chan out by printing copies of her photos and throwing them in the complex's air ducts. Chan sees the photos and attacks May in her apartment, ordering May to return her son. While May tries to tell her that her son had died years ago, Chi-lo arrives and Chan takes him out of the apartment while driving back May. Back in the complex's utility systems, Chan sees a vision of her dead husband, begging her to let go of their "home" that no longer exists. Upon seeing a reflection of herself in the glass door of an electrical grid, she smashes it, causing a blackout throughout the entire complex.

Once May sees a cloth belonging to Chi-lo floating down from the sky, she quickly realises they are on the rooftop. After squeezing her way through the police who had been sent to investigate the blackout, she comes across Chan, who is preparing to jump off with Chi-lo. May quickly stops them and attacks Chan for kidnapping and traumatising Chi-lo. While May and her son embrace, Chan plunges to her death, wanting to reunite with her family in the afterlife. As the screen goes black, Chi-lo can be heard asking, "Mom, would you abandon me?", to which May replies, "Of course not, not even if you abandon me."

== Cast ==
- Karena Lam as Chan Yim-hung
- Shu Qi as May
- Alex Fong as Ray Cheng
- Lam Suet as Lo Wai
- Ho Tam-chun as Cheng Chi-lo / Chan Wing-man
- Matt Chow as Mr. Chan
- Yan Chau-hin as Mrs Chan
- Lisa Togo as Daisy Chan
- Koan Hui as Mr Lok
- Fanny Lee as Mrs Lok
- Cheung Sin-ying as Lok's daughter
- Rocky Li as Chan Kin-shing

== Reception ==
In a 2025 review of "10 Classic Hong Kong movies that will chill you to the bones", Time Out said that, "There are no ghosts in Home Sweet Home, but it still doles out enough scares to keep you on the edge of your seat."
