= Henry Chung =

Chinese diplomat

- Born: Chung WuShiong; September 9, 1918; Hunan, China
- Died: April 23, 2017 (aged 98); San Francisco, California, U.S.
- Occupations: Diplomat, restaurateur

Henry Chung, born Chung WuShiong (Chinese: 鍾武雄; pinyin: Zhōng Wǔxióng; Wade–Giles: Chung Wu-hsiung; September 9, 1918 – April 23, 2017) was a Chinese diplomat who served in the Nationalist government of China and later started a well known Hunan restaurant in San Francisco.

== Early life and education ==
Chung was born in 1918 into a landed peasant family in Liling, Hunan. His father, Chung Wei Yi, was a soldier who died when Chung was approximately two years old; he was raised by his mother and grandmother. He earned a scholarship to high school. After graduating from Changjun High School, he was recruited by the National Revolutionary Army as a cashier. At the then National Central University in Chongqing, he studied English and then graduated with a degree in Chinese history.

== Government career ==
Chung became a civil servant and after the end of World War II was sent to Japan and in 1948 to a position in the consulate in Houston. After its defeat in the Chinese Civil War, the Nationalist government summoned Chung to Taiwan, but at his wife's insistence, he stayed in America.

== Restaurant ==
The family moved to San Francisco in 1961. There as previously in Houston, Chung started businesses including a dry cleaner, a shoe repair store, a toy shop, an ice cream booth, a hamburger restaurant, and an earlier Chinese restaurant, and also worked for China Airlines. In 1974, on his wife's advice, he started a small Chinese restaurant on Kearny Street in San Francisco's Chinatown called Hunan, serving spicy dishes based on his grandmother's cooking. It was one of the first Chinese restaurants in the United States to feature Hunan cuisine. Tony Hiss of The New Yorker described it in 1976 as "the best Chinese restaurant in the world"; after Herb Caen noted the fact in his San Francisco Chronicle column, the restaurant exploded in popularity. Chung moved to larger premises in 1979 and later expanded Hunan into a local chain that came to be called Henry's Hunan. In 1978 he published Henry Chung’s Hunan Style Chinese Cookbook, edited with an introduction by Hiss. Chung appears in Les Blank's 1980 documentary Garlic Is as Good as Ten Mothers. In the 1980s, the World Association of Chefs' Societies named him one of Four Famous Chefs worldwide.

After his retirement, Chung funded two primary schools and a middle school in his hometown. He also endowed scholarships in the United States. In 1981, he and his wife paid for a new historical marker at China Beach.

== Personal life and death ==
Chung's first marriage was an arranged child marriage when he was 8, to a 12-year-old girl. They had a son and two daughters, all of whom moved to the United States in the 1980s after being persecuted in the Cultural Revolution; Chung and his wife sponsored them and their families and provided them with restaurant jobs. His second wife, Hwang TehYung (Chinese: 黃德榮; pinyin: Huáng Déróng; Wade–Giles: Huang Te-jung), who took the name Diane Chung in America, was a star volleyball player and hurdler whom he met at university. They had three sons and two daughters; she died in 2003. Her sister was married to Ho Feng-Shan, who also moved to San Francisco. Chung's granddaughter MacKenzie Chung Fegan has been the lead restaurant critic of the San Francisco Chronicle since early 2024.

Chung died on April 23, 2017, in San Francisco, aged 99.
