= List of Hong Kong films of 1999 =

This article lists feature-length Hong Kong films released in 1999.

== Box office ==
The highest-grossing Hong Kong films released in 1999, by domestic box office gross revenue, are as follows:

Highest-grossing films released in 1999
Rank	Title	Domestic gross
1	King of Comedy	HK$29,848,860
2	Gorgeous	HK$27,547,639
3	A Man Called Hero	HK$23,368,902
4	The Legend of Speed	HK$19,439,085
5	The Tricky Master	HK$19,141,640
6	The Conmen in Vegas	HK$17,778,155
7	Gen-X Cops	HK$15,634,514
8	Prince Charming	HK$15,309,865
9	Running Out of Time	HK$14,659,574
10	Tempting Heart	HK$12,463,633

== Releases ==
Title	Director	Cast	Genre	Notes
Afraid of Nothing, the Jobless King	Joe Ma			
The Alchemy of Ecstasy'	Stephen Yip			
L' Am-Stram-Gram	Tin Hang			
Anna and the King	Andy Tennant	Jodie Foster, Chow Yun-fat	Drama	Shot in Malaysia
Augustin, Roi du Kung Fu	Anne Fontaine			
Away with Words	Christopher Doyle			Screened at the 1999 Cannes Film Festival
Battle of Love	Stephen Yip			
Beach Girl	Soi Cheang			
A Beautiful New World	Shi Runjiu			Copyright notice: 1998.
Believe It Or Not	Wellson Chin			
Bewitched	Li Chao			
Big Spender	Tommy Law			
Fascination Amour	Herman Yau	Andy Lau	Romantic comedy	Shot in Puerto Rico
Gen-X Cops	Benny Chan	Nicholas Tse, Stephen Fung, Sam Lee, Grace Yip, Daniel Wu, Francis Ng, Moses Chan, Eric Tsang, Wayne Lai, Jackie Chan	Action	
Gorgeous	Vincent Kok	Jackie Chan, Tony Leung Chiu-Wai, Shu Qi, Emil Chau, Richie Jen	Action / comedy / romance	
The HK Triad	Clarence Fok	Francis Ng, Athena Chu, Lau Ching Wan, Diana Pang, Michael Tse, Patrick Tam, Lee Siu-kei, Frankie Ng, Lam Sheung-yee	Crime / triad	
I.C. Kill	Mihiel Wong	Michael Tse, Jason Chu, Liz Kong, Wan Yeung-ming, Lam Chi Ho	Suspense / thriller	
Jackie Chan: My Stunts	Jackie Chan	Jackie Chan	Documentary	
King of Comedy	Stephen Chow, Lee Lik-Chi	Stephen Chow, Karen Mok, Cecilia Cheung, Ng Man Tat, Jackie Chan	Comedy	
Love Will Tear Us Apart	Yu Lik-wai			Entered into the 1999 Cannes Film Festival
The Mirror	Siu Wing	Nicholas Tse	Horror	
Ordinary Heroes	Ann Hui	Loletta Lee, Lee Kang-sheng, Anthony Wong	Drama	Entered into the 49th Berlin International Film Festival
Purple Storm	Teddy Chan	Daniel Wu, Kam Kwok Leung, Wakin Chau, Josie Ho, Joan Chen, Patrick Tam, Moses Chan	Action / sci-fi	
Tempting Heart	Sylvia Chang			
The Tricky Master	Wong Jing	Stephen Chow, Nick Cheung, Sandra Ng, Wong Jing, Suki Kwan	Comedy	
Troublesome Night 5	Herman Yau	Louis Koo, Simon Lui, Law Lan, Wayne Lai, Chin Kar-lok, Amanda Lee Wai Man, Lee Kin-Yan	Horror / romance / comedy	
Troublesome Night 6	Herman Yau	Louis Koo, Gigi Lai, Simon Lui, Amanda Lee Wai Man, Wayne Lai, Belinda Hamnett, Law Lan, Nadia Chan	Horror / romance / comedy	
The Truth About Jane and Sam	Derek Yee	Fann Wong		
Victim	Ringo Lam		Thriller	
A Wicked Ghost	Tony Leung Hung Wah	Francis Ng, Gigi Lai, Gabriel Harrison, Edward Mok, Nelson Ngai, Celia Sze	Horror	
The Mission	Johnnie To	Anthony Wong, Francis Ng, Simon Yam, Lam Suet	Action	

== See also ==
- 1999 in Hong Kong
