= 36th Golden Horse Awards =

Award ceremony for Chinese-language films of 1998 and 1999

- Date: 12 December 1999
- Site: Sun Yat-sen Memorial Hall, Taipei, Taiwan
- Hosted by: Matilda Tao and Wakin Chau
- Preshow hosts: Tong Chih-cheng and Bowie Tsang
- Organized by: Taipei Golden Horse Film Festival Executive Committee

Highlights
- Best Feature Film: Ordinary Heroes
- Best Director: Ann Hui; Ordinary Heroes
- Best Actor: Ko Chun-hsiung; Generation Pendragon
- Best Actress: Loletta Lee; Ordinary Heroes
- Most awards: Ordinary Heroes (5)
- Most nominations: Ordinary Heroes (10)

Television in Taiwan
- Channel: TVBS-G
- Ratings: 2.67% (average)

The 36th Golden Horse Awards (Chinese: 第36屆金馬獎) took place on 12 December 1999 at the Sun Yat-sen Memorial Hall in Taipei, Taiwan.

== Winners and nominees ==
Winners are listed first and highlighted in boldface.

**Best Feature Film**: **Ordinary Heroes**; Tempting Heart; Victim; Fly Me to Polaris; Purple Storm; Darkness and Light	**Best Short Film**: **Layover**; Postcard; Summer Exercise; Cut the Skin
**Best Documentary**: **The Red Leaf Legend**; The Lost Kingdom; Fairies on the Pond; Ga Ya	**Best Animation**: **Kaualan**
**Best Director**: **Ann Hui — Ordinary Heroes**; Ringo Lam — Victim; Teddy Chan — Purple Storm; Chang Tso-chi — Darkness and Light	**Best Leading Actor**: **Ko Chun-hsiung — Generation Pendragon**; Anthony Wong — Ordinary Heroes; Nicholas Tse — Metade Fumaca; Sean Lau — Victim
**Best Leading Actress**: **Rachel Lee — Ordinary Heroes**; Gigi Leung — Tempting Heart; Athena Chu — Then Boss Up There; Lee Kang-yi — Darkness and Light	**Best Supporting Actor**: **Leon Dai — A Chance to Die**; Ti Lung — The Kid; Tsai Chen-nan — Cop Abula; Lung Shao-hua — March of Happiness
**Best Supporting Actress**: **Deanie Ip — A Dumb Boy**; Elaine Jin — Tempting Heart; Moon Wang — Woman Soup; Josie Ho — Purple Storm
**Audience Choice Award**: **Darkness and Light**	**Grand Jury Award**: **Darkness and Light**
**Special Jury Award**: **Huang Ming-chuan — Flat Tyre**	**Lifetime Achievement Award**: **Bai Ching-zue**; **Kong Hong**
