= 19th Hong Kong Film Awards =

2000 Hong Kong Film Awards

- Date: 16 April 2000
- Site: Hong Kong Coliseum
- Hosted by: Eric Tsang, Sandra Ng and Vincent Kok

The 19th Hong Kong Film Awards ceremony, honored the best films of 1999 and took place on 16 April 2000 at the Hong Kong Coliseum, Hung Hom, Kowloon, Hong Kong. The ceremony was hosted by Eric Tsang, Sandra Ng and Vincent Kok, during the ceremony awards are presented in 16 categories.

== Awards ==
Winners are listed first, highlighted in boldface, and indicated with a double dagger (‡).

**Best Film**: **Ordinary Heroes**‡; Little Cheung; The Mission; Fly Me to Polaris; Running Out of Time	**Best Director**: **Johnnie To – The Mission**‡; Sylvia Chang – Tempting Heart; Ann Hui – Ordinary Heroes; Ringo Lam – Victim; Johnnie To – Running Out of Time
**Best Screenplay**: **Sylvia Chang and Cat Kwan – Tempting Heart**‡; Riley Yip – Metade Fumaca; Yau Nai-Hoi, Laurent Courtiaud and Julien Carbon – Running Out of Time; Fruit Chan – Little Cheung; Chan King-chung – Ordinary Heroes	**Best Actor**: **Andy Lau – Running Out of Time**‡; Eric Tsang – Metade Fumaca; Anthony Wong – Ordinary Heroes; Sean Lau – Victim; Francis Ng – Bullets Over Summer
**Best Actress**: **Law Lan – Bullets Over Summer**‡; Deanie Ip – Crying Heart; Loletta Lee – Ordinary Heroes; Gigi Leung – Tempting Heart; Cecilia Cheung – Fly Me to Polaris	**Best Supporting Actor**: **Ti Lung – The Kid**‡; Tse Kwan Ho – Ordinary Heroes; Lam Suet – The Mission; Robby – Little Cheung; Hui Shiu Hung – Running Out of Time
**Best Supporting Actress**: **Carrie Ng – The Kid**‡; Elaine Jin – Metade Fumaca; Elaine Jin – Tempting Heart; Nina Paw – Ordinary Heroes; Josie Ho – Purple Storm	**Best New Performer**: **Cecilia Cheung – Fly Me to Polaris**‡; Fann Wong – The Truth About Jane and Sam; Yiu Yuet-Ming – Little Cheung; Richie Jen – Fly Me to Polaris; Cecilia Cheung – King of comedy
**Best Cinematography**: **Arthur Wong – Purple Storm**‡; Ross Clarkson – Victim; Peter Pau – Metade Fumaca; Jingle Ma and Chan Kwok Hung – Fly Me to Polaris; Arthur Wong – Gen-X Cops	**Best Action Choreography**: **Stephen Tung – Purple Storm**‡; Nicky Lee – Gen-X Cops; Jackie Chan and Jackie Chan Stunt Team – Gorgeous; Cheng Ka-Sang – The Mission; Dion Lam – A Man Called Hero
**Best Film Editing**: **Kam Kwok-Leung – Purple Storm**‡; Andy Chan – The Mission; Andy Chan – Running Out of Time; Cheung Ka-fai – Gen-X Cops; Tin Sam-Fat – Little Cheung	**Best Art Direction**: **Man Lim Chung – Tempting Heart**‡; Pater Wong – Metade Fumaca; Jeff Mak – Purple Storm; Bruce Yu – Gen-X Cops; Elbut Poon and Ringo Fung – Ordinary Heroes
**Best Costume Make Up Design**: **Dora Ng – Purple Storm**‡; Kenneth Yee – Tempting Heart; Dora Ng – Metade Fumaca; Bruce Yu – Gen-X Cops; Lee Pik-Kwan – A Man Called Hero	**Best Original Film Score**: **Peter Kam – Fly Me to Polaris**‡; Lam Wah-Chuen and Carlton Chu – Little Cheung; Chung Chi-Wing – The Mission; Chan Kwong Wing – A Man Called Hero; Peter Kam – Purple Storm
**Best Original Film Song**: ***星語心願 —Fly Me to Polaris**‡; Composer: Peter Kam; Lyricist: Ko Suet Nam; Singer: Cecilia Cheung; 天煞孤星 – A Man Called Hero; Composer: Chan Kwong Wing; Lyricist: Albert Leung; Singer: Ekin Cheng; 愛後餘生 – Metade Fumaca; Composer: Ng Lok Shing; Lyricist: Albert Leung; Singer: Nicholas Tse; Candle Light – Fly Me to Polaris; Composer: Poon Hip Hing; Lyricist: Poon Hip Hing; Singer: Richie Jen; 泡沬童真 – Little Cheung; Composer: Lam Wah Chuen; Lyricist: Lam Wah Chuen; Singer: Jo Koo	**Best Sound Design**: **Kinson Tsang – Purple Storm**‡; Cuson Liu and Phyllis Cheng – Bullets Over Summer; Martin Chappell – Victim; Kinson Tsang – Gen-X Cops; Kinson Tsang – A Man Called Hero
