= Hong Kong Film Award for Best Actor =

Annual Chinese film award

- Awarded for: Performance by an actor in a leading role
- Country: Hong Kong
- Presented by: Hong Kong Film Awards
- First award: 1982
- Currently held by: Tony Leung Ka-fai — The Shadow's Edge (2026)

The Hong Kong Film Award for Best Actor is an annual Hong Kong industry award presented to an actor for the best performance by an actor in a leading role.

== History ==
The award was established at the 1st Hong Kong Film Awards (1982) and the first winner and the sole participant in this category was Michael Hui for his role in the film Security Unlimited. From the 2nd Hong Kong Film Awards (1983), there are 5, sometimes 6, nominations for the category of Best Actor from which one actor is chosen the winner of the Hong Kong Film Award for Best Actor, except the 2nd Awards when Sammo Hung and Karl Maka shared the award. The most recent recipient of the award was Tony Leung Ka-fai, who was honoured at the 44th Hong Kong Film Awards (2026), for his performance in The Shadow's Edge.

The actor with most awards in this category is Tony Leung Chiu-wai with six wins. He also holds the record for the actor with the most awards in the Best Supporting Actor category. Jackie Chan holds the record for an actor with the most nominations without ever winning, until the 24th Hong Kong Film Awards (2005) he was nominated 10 times without a single award.

== Winners and nominees ==
Year	Actor	Film	Note
1982 (1st)	Michael Hui	Security Unlimited	
1983 (2nd)	Karl Maka	Aces Go Places	
1983 (2nd)	Sammo Hung	Carry On Pickpocket	
1983 (2nd)	Michael Chan	Crimson Street	
1983 (2nd)	George Lam	Boat People	
1983 (2nd)	Leslie Cheung	Nomad	
1984 (3rd)	Tony Leung Ka-fai	Reign Behind a Curtain	
1984 (3rd)	Peter Wang	Ah Ying	
1984 (3rd)	Sammo Hung	The Dead and the Deadly	
1984 (3rd)	Richard Ng	Winners & Sinners	
1984 (3rd)	Alex Man	Hong Kong, Hong Kong	
1985 (4th)	Danny Lee	Law with Two Phases	
1985 (4th)	Chow Yun-fat	Hong Kong 1941	
1985 (4th)	Kent Cheng	Beloved Daddy	
1985 (4th)	Michael Hui	Teppanyaki	
1985 (4th)	Jackie Chan	Project A	
1986 (5th)	Kent Cheng	Why Me?	
1986 (5th)	Chow Yun-fat	Women	
1986 (5th)	Michael Hui	Mr. Boo Meets Pom Pom	
1986 (5th)	Jackie Chan	Heart of Dragon	
1986 (5th)	Jackie Chan	Police Story	
1987 (6th)	Chow Yun-fat	A Better Tomorrow	
1987 (6th)	Danny Lee	Brotherhood	
1987 (6th)	Ti Lung	A Better Tomorrow	
1987 (6th)	Michael Hui	Inspector Chocolate	
1987 (6th)	Tony Leung Ka-fai	The Last Emperor	
1987 (6th)	Tony Leung Chiu-wai	Love Unto Waste	
1988 (7th)	Chow Yun-fat	City on Fire	
1988 (7th)	Leslie Cheung	A Better Tomorrow II	
1988 (7th)	Chow Yun-fat	An Autumn's Tale	
1988 (7th)	Chow Yun-fat	Prison on Fire	
1988 (7th)	Danny Lee	City on Fire	
1988 (7th)	Eric Tsang	Final Victory	
1988 (7th)	Da Shichang	The Romance of Book and Sword	
1989 (8th)	Sammo Hung	Painted Faces	
1989 (8th)	Leslie Cheung	Rouge	
1989 (8th)	Michael Hui	Chicken and Duck Talk	
1989 (8th)	Andy Lau	As Tears Go By	
1989 (8th)	Max Mok	Lai Shi, China's Last Eunuch	
1990 (9th)	Chow Yun-fat	All About Ah-Long	
1990 (9th)	Jackie Chan	Miracles	
1990 (9th)	Chow Yun-fat	God of Gamblers	
1990 (9th)	Michael Hui	Mr. Coconut	
1990 (9th)	Sammo Hung	Eight Taels of Gold	
1990 (9th)	Richard Ng	Beyond the Sunset	
1991 (10th)	Leslie Cheung	Days of Being Wild	
1991 (10th)	Jacky Cheung	Bullet in the Head	
1991 (10th)	Stephen Chow	All for the Winner	
1991 (10th)	Michael Hui	Front Page	
1991 (10th)	Tony Leung Ka-fai	Farewell China	
1992 (11th)	Eric Tsang	Alan and Eric - Between Hello and Goodbye	
1992 (11th)	Chow Yun-fat	Once a Thief	
1992 (11th)	Stephen Chow	Fight Back to School	
1992 (11th)	Andy Lau	Lee Rock	
1992 (11th)	Ray Lui	To Be Number One	
1993 (12th)	Tony Leung Ka-fai	92 Legendary La Rose Noire	
1993 (12th)	Jackie Chan	Police Story 3	
1993 (12th)	Stephen Chow	Justice, My Foot!	
1993 (12th)	Charles Heung	Arrest the Restless	
1993 (12th)	Tony Leung Ka-fai	King of Chess	
1994 (13th)	Anthony Wong	The Untold Story	
1994 (13th)	Jackie Chan	Crime Story	
1994 (13th)	Sean Lau	C'est la vie, mon chéri	
1994 (13th)	Sean Lau	Thou Shalt Not Swear	
1994 (13th)	Wu Xing Guo	Temptation of a Monk	
1995 (14th)	Tony Leung Chiu-wai	Chungking Express	
1995 (14th)	Jacky Cheung	To Live and Die in Tsimshatsui	
1995 (14th)	Leslie Cheung	He's a Woman, She's a Man	
1995 (14th)	Chow Yun-fat	Treasure Hunt	
1995 (14th)	Stephen Chow	From Beijing with Love	
1995 (14th)	Eric Kot	Oh! My Three Guys	
1996 (15th)	Roy Chiao	Summer Snow	
1996 (15th)	Andy Lau	Full Throttle	
1996 (15th)	Stephen Chow	A Chinese Odyssey Part 2: Cinderella	
1996 (15th)	Chow Yun-fat	Peace Hotel	
1996 (15th)	Jackie Chan	Rumble in the Bronx	
1997 (16th)	Kent Cheng	The Log	
1997 (16th)	Jackie Chan	Police Story 4: First Strike	
1997 (16th)	Leslie Cheung	Viva Erotica	
1997 (16th)	Leon Lai	Comrades: Almost a Love Story	
1997 (16th)	Sean Lau	Big Bullet	
1997 (16th)	Michael Wong	First Option	
1998 (17th)	Tony Leung Chiu-wai	Happy Together	
1998 (17th)	Leslie Cheung	Happy Together	
1998 (17th)	Sean Lau	Full Alert	
1998 (17th)	Tony Leung Ka-fai	Island of Greed	
1998 (17th)	Tse Kwan-ho	The Mad Phoenix	
1999 (18th)	Anthony Wong	Beast Cops	
1999 (18th)	Jackie Chan	Who Am I?	
1999 (18th)	Sonny Chiba	The Storm Riders	
1999 (18th)	Leon Lai	City of Glass	
1999 (18th)	Sean Lau	The Longest Nite	
1999 (18th)	Tony Leung Chiu-wai	The Longest Nite	
2000 (19th)	Andy Lau	Running Out of Time	
2000 (19th)	Sean Lau	The Victim	
2000 (19th)	Francis Ng	Bullets Over Summer	
2000 (19th)	Eric Tsang	Metade Fumaca	
2000 (19th)	Anthony Wong	Ordinary Heroes	
2001 (20th)	Tony Leung Chiu-wai	In the Mood for Love	
2001 (20th)	Chow Yun-fat	Crouching Tiger, Hidden Dragon	
2001 (20th)	Andy Lau	A Fighter's Blues	
2001 (20th)	Tony Leung Ka-fai	Jiang hu: The Triad Zone	
2001 (20th)	Francis Ng	Juliet in Love	
2002 (21st)	Stephen Chow	Shaolin Soccer	
2002 (21st)	Jacky Cheung	July Rhapsody	
2002 (21st)	Hu Jun	Lan Yu	
2002 (21st)	Andy Lau	Love on a Diet	
2002 (21st)	Liu Ye	Lan Yu	
2003 (22nd)	Tony Leung Chiu-wai	Infernal Affairs	
2003 (22nd)	Leslie Cheung	Inner Senses	
2003 (22nd)	Leon Lai	Three: Going Home	
2003 (22nd)	Andy Lau	Infernal Affairs	
2003 (22nd)	Tony Leung Ka-fai	Double Vision	
2004 (23rd)	Andy Lau	Running on Karma	
2004 (23rd)	Jacky Cheung	Golden Chicken 2	
2004 (23rd)	Sean Lau	Lost in Time	
2004 (23rd)	Francis Ng	Infernal Affairs II	
2004 (23rd)	Simon Yam	PTU	
2005 (24th)	Tony Leung Chiu-wai	2046	
2005 (24th)	Jackie Chan	New Police Story	
2005 (24th)	Stephen Chow	Kung Fu Hustle	
2005 (24th)	Alex Fong	One Nite in Mongkok	
2005 (24th)	Daniel Wu	One Nite in Mongkok	
2006 (25th)	Tony Leung Ka-fai	Election	
2006 (25th)	Simon Yam	Election	
2006 (25th)	Aaron Kwok	Divergence	
2006 (25th)	Tony Leung Ka-fai	Everlasting Regret	
2006 (25th)	Andy Lau	Wait 'til You're Older	
2007 (26th)	Sean Lau	My Name Is Fame	
2007 (26th)	Aaron Kwok	After This Our Exile	
2007 (26th)	Tony Leung Chiu-wai	Confession of Pain	
2007 (26th)	Chow Yun-fat	Curse of the Golden Flower	
2007 (26th)	Jet Li	Fearless	
2008 (27th)	Jet Li	The Warlords	
2008 (27th)	Aaron Kwok	The Detective	
2008 (27th)	Simon Yam	Eye in the Sky	
2008 (27th)	Sean Lau	Mad Detective	
2008 (27th)	Andy Lau	The Warlords	
2009 (28th)	Nick Cheung	Beast Stalker	
2009 (28th)	Louis Koo	Run Papa Run	
2009 (28th)	Tony Leung Chiu-wai	Red Cliff	
2009 (28th)	Simon Yam	Sparrow	
2009 (28th)	Donnie Yen	Ip Man	
2010 (29th)	Simon Yam	Echoes of the Rainbow	
2010 (29th)	Wang Xueqi	Bodyguards and Assassins	
2010 (29th)	Simon Yam	Night and Fog	
2010 (29th)	Aaron Kwok	Murderer	
2010 (29th)	Sean Lau	Overheard	
2011 (30th)	Nicholas Tse	The Stool Pigeon	
2011 (30th)	Chow Yun-fat	Confucius	
2011 (30th)	Jacky Cheung	Crossing Hennessy	
2011 (30th)	Tony Leung Ka-fai	Bruce Lee, My Brother	
2011 (30th)	Nick Cheung	The Stool Pigeon	
2012 (31st)	Andy Lau	A Simple Life	
2012 (31st)	Sean Lau	Life Without Principle	
2012 (31st)	Sean Lau	Overheard 2	
2012 (31st)	Jiang Wen	Let the Bullets Fly	
2012 (31st)	Ge You	Let the Bullets Fly	
2013 (32nd)	Tony Leung Ka-fai	Cold War	
2013 (32nd)	Nick Cheung	Nightfall	
2013 (32nd)	Chapman To	Vulgaria	
2013 (32nd)	Sean Lau	The Bullet Vanishes	
2013 (32nd)	Tony Leung Chiu-wai	The Silent War	
2014 (33rd)	Nick Cheung	Unbeatable	
2014 (33rd)	Tony Leung Chiu-wai	The Grandmaster	
2014 (33rd)	Louis Koo	The White Storm	
2014 (33rd)	Sean Lau	The White Storm	
2014 (33rd)	Anthony Wong	Ip Man: The Final Fight	
2015 (34th)	Sean Lau	Overheard 3	
2015 (34th)	Eddie Peng	Rise of the Legend	
2015 (34th)	Sean Lau	Insanity	
2015 (34th)	Huang Bo	Dearest	
2015 (34th)	Daniel Wu	That Demon Within	
2016 (35th)	Aaron Kwok	Port of Call	
2016 (35th)	Andy Lau	Lost and Love	
2016 (35th)	Nick Cheung	Keeper of Darkness	
2016 (35th)	Tony Leung Ka-fai	The Taking of Tiger Mountain	
2016 (35th)	Jacky Cheung	Heaven in the Dark	
2017 (36th)	Gordon Lam	Trivisa	
2017 (36th)	Shawn Yue	Mad World	
2017 (36th)	Francis Ng	Shed Skin Papa	
2017 (36th)	Tony Leung Ka-fai	Cold War 2	
2017 (36th)	Richie Jen	Trivisa	
2018 (37th)	Louis Koo	Paradox	
2018 (37th)	Andy Lau	Shock Wave	
2018 (37th)	Ronald Cheng	Concerto of the Bully	
2018 (37th)	Tian Zhuangzhuang	Love Education	
2018 (37th)	Ling Man-lung	Tomorrow Is Another Day	
2019 (38th)	Anthony Wong	Still Human	
2019 (38th)	Aaron Kwok	Project Gutenberg	
2019 (38th)	Chow Yun-fat	Project Gutenberg	
2019 (38th)	Philip Keung	Tracey	
2019 (38th)	Francis Ng	Man on the Dragon	
2020 (39th)	Tai Bo	Suk Suk	
2020 (39th)	Aaron Kwok	I'm Livin’ It	
2020 (39th)	Louis Koo	A Witness Out Of The Blue	
2020 (39th)	Chu Pak Hong	My Prince Edward	
2020 (39th)	Jackson Yee	Better Days	
2022 (40th)	Patrick Tse	Time	
2022 (40th)	Gordon Lam	Hand Rolled Cigarette	
2022 (40th)	Gordon Lam	Limbo	
2022 (40th)	Leung Chung-hang	Zero to Hero	
2022 (40th)	Francis Ng	Drifting	
2023 (41st)	Sean Lau	Detective vs Sleuths	
2023 (41st)	Mak Pui-tung	The Sparring Partner	
2023 (41st)	Yeung Wai-lun	The Sparring Partner	
2023 (41st)	Anthony Wong	The Sunny Side of the Street	
2023 (41st)	Louis Cheung	The Narrow Road	
2024 (42nd)	Tony Leung Chiu-wai	The Goldfinger	
2024 (42nd)	Bowie Lam	In Broad Daylight	
2024 (42nd)	Siuyea Lo	Time Still Turns the Pages	
2024 (42nd)	Dayo Wong	A Guilty Conscience	
2024 (42nd)	Dong Chengpeng	Dust to Dust	
2025 (43rd)	Sean Lau	Papa	
2025 (43rd)	Raymond Lam	Twilight of the Warriors: Walled In	
2025 (43rd)	Neo Yau	The Way We Talk	
2025 (43rd)	Michael Hui	The Last Dance	
2025 (43rd)	Aaron Kwok	Rob N Roll	
2025 (44th)	Tony Leung Ka-fai	The Shadow's Edge	
2025 (44th)	Louis Koo	Behind the Shadows	
2025 (44th)	Louis Cheung	Golden Boy	
2025 (44th)	Louis Koo	Back to the Past	
2025 (44th)	Carlos Chan	Someone Like Me	

== Multiple wins and nominations ==
The following individuals received two or more Best Actor awards:

Wins	Actor	Years
6	Tony Leung Chiu-wai	1995, 1998, 2001, 2003, 2005, 2024
5	Tony Leung Ka-fai	1984, 1993, 2006, 2013, 2026
4	Sean Lau	2007, 2015, 2023, 2025
3	Andy Lau	2000, 2004, 2012
3	Anthony Wong	1994, 1999, 2019
3	Chow Yun-fat	1987, 1988, 1990
2	Kent Cheng	1986, 1997
2	Nick Cheung	2009, 2014
2	Sammo Hung	1983, 1989

The following individuals received five or more Best Actor nominations:

Nominations	Actor
18	Sean Lau
15	Chow Yun-fat
15	Tony Leung Ka-fai
13	Andy Lau
12	Tony Leung Chiu-wai
10	Jackie Chan
8	Leslie Cheung
8	Michael Hui
8	Aaron Kwok
7	Stephen Chow
6	Anthony Wong
6	Francis Ng
6	Jacky Cheung
6	Louis Koo
6	Simon Yam
5	Nick Cheung

== Records ==
Items	Name	Statistics	Notes
Most wins	Tony Leung Chiu-wai	6 wins	12 nominations
Most nominations	Sean Lau	18 nominations	4 wins
Oldest winner	Patrick Tse	Age 85 years, 342 days	for Time
Oldest nominee	Patrick Tse	Age 85 years, 191 days	for Time
Youngest winner	Tony Leung Ka-fai	Age 26 years, 185 days	for Reign Behind a Curtain
Youngest nominee	Jackson Yee	Age 19 years, 76 days	for Better Days
Most nominations without win	Jackie Chan	10 nominations	

== See also ==
- Hong Kong Film Award
- Hong Kong Film Award for Best Actress
- Hong Kong Film Award for Best Supporting Actor
- Hong Kong Film Award for Best Supporting Actress
- Hong Kong Film Award for Best Action Choreography
- Hong Kong Film Award for Best Cinematography
- Hong Kong Film Award for Best Director
- Hong Kong Film Award for Best Film
- Hong Kong Film Award for Best New Performer
