= Hong Kong Film Critics Society Award =

Annual film award

The Hong Kong Film Critics Society Award (Chinese: 香港電影評論學會大獎) is the annual award given by the Hong Kong Film Critics Society in Hong Kong since 1994. The award is determined by votes cast in three rounds after a substantial discussion session between the members of the society. The transcript of each discussion can be found in the annual journal of Hong Kong film reviews which is published by the society every year.

The society presents the awards in an informal yet prestigious ceremony. Over the years, several venues have been used for the awards presentation, including Planet Hollywood Restaurant (closed), Hong Kong Art Centre, Hong Kong Convention and Exhibition Centre, and Hong Kong Film Archive.

== Awards ceremonies ==
| Year | Ceremony Presenter | Best Film | Best Director | Best Screenplay | Best Actor | Best Actress | Films of Merit | Special Achievement Award |
|---|---|---|---|---|---|---|---|---|
| 2025 | Sean Lau | Ciao UFO | Jonathan Li, Chou Man-yu (Behind the Shadows) | Kwok Ka Hei, Lee Chun Kit, Ho Siu Hong, Choi Ka Hang (Unidentified Murder) | Louis Koo (Behind the Shadows) | Fish Liew (Someone Like Me) | Unidentified Murder; Behind the Shadows; Girl; Paws Land; Another World; The Shadow's Edge | |
| 2024 | Sammi Cheng | Twilight of the Warriors: Walled In | Philip Yung (Papa) | Albert Mak, Ryker Chan, Man Uen-Ching (Rob N Roll) | Lau Ching-Wan (Papa) | Hedwig Tam (Montages of a Modern Motherhood) | Rob N Roll; Obedience; Four Trails; The Way We Talk; All Shall Be Well; Love Lies; Papa; Winter Chants; The Last Dance; An Abandoned Team | |
| 2023 | Wai Ka-fai | Mad Fate | Jonathan Li (Dust to Dust) | Sasha Chuk (Fly Me to the Moon) | Wu Kang-ren (Fly Me to the Moon) | Jennifer Yu (In Broad Daylight) | Dust to Dust; Time Still Turns the Pages; To Be Continued; Fly Me to the Moon; In Broad Daylight; Elegies; The Goldfinger; The Lyricist Wannabe | |
| 2022 | Alfred Cheung | To My Nineteen Year Old Self | Wai Ka-fai (Detective vs Sleuths); Lam Sum (The Narrow Road) | Wai Ka-fai, Ray Chan, Mak Tin-shu (Detective vs Sleuths) | Louis Cheung (The Narrow Road) | Sammi Cheng (Lost Love) | The Narrow Road; The Sunny Side of the Street; Lost Love; Detective vs Sleuths; Septet: The Story of Hong Kong; Table for Six; The Sparring Partner; Hong Kong Family; Warriors of Future | |
| 2021 | Matthew Cheng Ching-hang (Note: Due to preventive measures against COVID-19, the award presentation ceremony was moved online, and the awards were presented by the president of the society.) | Limbo | Benny Chan (Raging Fire) | Ho Ching-yi, Gordon Lam (Time) | Patrick Tse (Time) | Cya Liu (Limbo) | Raging Fire; Hand Rolled Cigarette; Time; Drifting; Caught in Time; Coffin Homes; Shock Wave 2 The Way We Keep Dancing; Anita; Zero to Hero | |
| 2020 | Cecilia Wong | Inside the Red Brick Wall | Peter Chan (Leap) | Kate Reilly, Leung Ming Kai (Memories to Choke On, Drinks to Wash Them Down) | —N/a | Gong Li (Leap) | Keep Rolling; Memories to Choke On, Drinks to Wash Them Down; 3CM; Leap; One Second Champion | |
| 2019 | John Chong | Suk Suk | Derek Tsang (Better Days) | Norris Wong (My Prince Edward) | Tai Bo (Suk Suk); Lau Chun-him (Beyond The Dream) | Cecilia Choi (Beyond The Dream) | Bamboo Theatre; My Prince Edward; The Great Detective Sherlock Holmes - The Greatest Jail-Breaker; The New King of Comedy; Beyond The Dream; Better Days | |
| 2018 | Andy Lau | Three Husbands | Fruit Chan (Three Husbands) | Oliver Chan (Still Human) | Anthony Wong Chau Sang (Still Human) | Zeng Meihuizi (Three Husbands) | Still Human; G Affairs; I've Got the Blues; A Family Tour; Project Gutenberg | |
| 2017 | George Lam | Our Time Will Come | Sylvia Chang (Love Education) | Xiong Zhaozheng, Maria Wong, Frankie Tam, MengZhang Wu (God of War) | Yasuaki Kurata (God of War) | Stephy Tang (The Empty Hands) | God of War; Love Education; The Empty Hands; Always Be With You; Wu Kong; Lost in the Fumes; 29+1; Paradox | |
| 2016 | Michael Hui | Trivisa | Stephen Chow (The Mermaid); Wong Chun (Mad World) | Florence Chan (Mad World) | Gordon Lam (Trivisa) | Zhou Dongyu (Soul Mate) | Mad World; The Mermaid; Soul Mate; Weeds on Fire; Snuggle; See You Tomorrow | |
| 2015 | Teddy Robin | Port of Call | Tsui Hark (The Taking of Tiger Mountain) | Sylvia Chang, Yukihiko Kageyama (Murmur of the Hearts) | Michael Ning (Port of Call) | Jessie Li (Port of Call) | The Taking of Tiger Mountain; Murmur of the Hearts; Ten Years; SPL II: A Time for Consequences; Office; Keeper of Darkness; She Remembers, He Forgets | |
| 2014 | Paw Hee-Ching | The Midnight After | Fruit Chan (The Midnight After) | Zhang Ji (Dearest); Wai Ka-fai, Ryker Chan, Yu Xi (Don't Go Breaking My Heart 2) | Lau Ching-Wan (Overheard 3) | Zhao Wei (Dearest) | Dearest; The Golden Era; Overheard 3 Kung Fu Jungle; The Crossing; That Demon Within; Dot 2 Dot; Don't Go Breaking My Heart 2 Sara | |
| 2013 | Raymond Chow | The Grandmaster | Johnnie To (Drug War) | Wai Ka-Fai, Yau Nai-Hoi, Chan Wai Bun, Yu Xi (Drug War) | Nick Cheung (Unbeatable) | Zhang Ziyi (The Grandmaster) | Drug War; Unbeatable; Ip Man: The Final Fight; The Way We Dance; Blind Detective; Rigor Mortis | |
| 2012 | Law Lan | Motorway | Cheang Pou-soi (Motorway); Dante Lam (The Viral Factor) | Wai Ka-Fai, Yau Nai-Hoi, Chan Wai Bun, Au Man-Kit (Romancing in Thin Air) | Chapman To (Diva) | —N/a | Love Lifting; The Viral Factor; One Tree Three Lives; My Sassy Hubby; Romancing in Thin Air; The Bullet Vanishes; The Four; The Pork of Music | |
| 2011 | Ng See Yuen | A Simple Life | Jiang Wen (Let the Bullets Fly) | Yau Nai-Hoi, Yip Tin-Shing, Ben Wong, Jeff Cheung (Life Without Principle) | Lau Ching-Wan (Life Without Principle) | Deanie Ip (A Simple Life) | Life Without Principle; Overheard 2 Don't Go Breaking My Heart; Flying Swords of Dragon Gate; Let the Bullets Fly; White Vengeance; Big Blue Lake | |
| 2010 awards | Johnnie To | Gallants | Su Chao-pin (Reign of Assassins) | Ivy Ho (Crossing Hennessy) | Teddy Robin (Gallants) | Miriam Yeung (Perfect Wedding) | Reign of Assassins; Crossing Hennessy; The Stool Pigeon; Breaking the Willow; La Comédie humaine Like a Dream; Love in a Puff (film) | |
| 2009 | Eric Tsang | KJ: Music and Life | Alan Mak, Felix Chong (Overheard) | Wai Ka-Fai, Au Kin-Yee (Written By) | Wang Xueqi (Bodyguards and Assassins) | Kara Hui (At the End of Daybreak) | Written By; Prince of Tears; Overheard; Tactical Unit – Comrades in Arms; Shinjuku Incident; Glamorous Youth; Bodyguards and Assassins | |
| 2008 | Derek Yee | The Way We Are | Ann Hui (The Way We Are) | Ivy Ho (Claustrophobia) | Nick Cheung (Beast Stalker) | Paw Hee-Ching (The Way We Are) | High Noon; Three Kingdoms: Resurrection of the Dragon; Sparrow; Run Papa Run; Beast Stalker; Claustrophobia; City Without Baseball | |
| 2007 | Stanley Kwan | The Postmodern Life of My Aunt | Ann Hui (The Postmodern Life of My Aunt) | Wai Ka-Fai, Au Kin-Yee (Mad Detective) | Tony Leung Ka-Fai (Eye in the Sky) | Siqin Gaowa (The Postmodern Life of My Aunt) | Eye in the Sky; The Warlords; Whispers and Moans; Hooked on You; Mad Detective; Triangle; Protege; The Detective | |
| 2006 | Joe Cheung | Election 2 | Johnnie To (Exiled) | Wong Jing, Tang Tut-hei (Wo Hu) | Jet Li (Fearless) | Gong Li (Curse of the Golden Flower) | Wo Hu; The Heavenly Kings; Confession of Pain; Exiled; On the Edge; Fearless; Heavenly Mission; After This Our Exile | |
| 2005 | Wong Tin-Lam | Election | Johnnie To (Election) | Wong Jing (Colour of the Loyalty) | Tony Leung Ka-Fai (Everlasting Regret) | Zhou Xun (Perhaps Love) | Seven Swords; Colour of the Loyalty; Crazy N' The City; Initial D SPL; Home Sweet Home; Perhaps Love; Everlasting Regret | |
| 2004 | Ann Hui | McDull, Prince de la Bun | Derek Yee (One Nite in Mongkok) | Gordon Chan, Chung Kai-Cheung (A-1 Headline) | Tony Leung Chiu-Wai (2046) | Zhang Ziyi (2046) | Dumplings: Three... Extremes; One Nite in Mongkok; Throwdown; Kung Fu Hustle; Love Battlefield; A-1 Headline; Colour Blossoms; 2046; Breaking News | |
| 2003 | Michael Hui | Infernal Affairs II | Johnnie To (PTU) | Wai Ka-Fai, Yau Nai-Hoi, Au Kin-Yee, Yip Tin-Shing (Running on Karma) | Andy Lau (Running on Karma) | Cecilia Cheung (Running on Karma) | PTU; Running on Karma; Lost in Time; Public Toilet; Infernal Affairs III; Men Suddenly in Black; Golden Chicken 2 Colour of the Truth; The Death Curse | |
| 2002 | Gordon Chan | Chinese Odyssey 2002 | Peter Chan (Three) | Fruit Chan (Hollywood Hong-Kong) | Anthony Wong Chau Sang (Infernal Affairs) | Faye Wong (Chinese Odyssey 2002) | Hollywood Hong Kong; Infernal Affairs; Fat Choi Spirit; Runaway Pistol; Shark Busters; Three; Inner Senses; The Mummy, Aged 19; The Eye; Second Time Around; New Blood | |
| 2001 | Connie Chan Po-chu | Shaolin Soccer | Ann Hui (Visible Secret) | Vincci Cheuk (Merry-Go-Round) | Lau Ching-Wan (La Brassiere) | Sammi Cheng (Wu yen) | Visible Secret; July Rhapsody; From the Queen to the Chief executive The Legend of Zu; Lan Yu; My Life as McDull; Running Out of Time 2 Merry Go Round | |
| 2000 | Chow Yun-fat | Durian Durian | Wong Kar-wai (In the Mood for Love) | Chan Hing-Ka, Amy Chin (Jiang hu: The Triad Zone) | Francis Ng (2000 AD) | Qin Hailu (Durian Durian) | Spacked Out; Crouching Tiger, Hidden Dragon; In the Mood for Love; Jiang Hu - The Triad Zone; Juliet in Love; Needing You | Yuen Woo-Ping (Crouching Tiger, Hidden Dragon) |
| 1999 | Peter Chan | The Mission | Johnnie To for The Mission | Matt Chow, Wilson Yip, Ben Cheung (Bullets Over Summer) | Francis Ng (Bullets Over Summer) | Law Lan (Bullets Over Summer) | Bullets Over Summer; Little Cheung; Ordinary Heroes; Victim; Love will Tear Us Apart; Running Out of Time; Tempting Heart | |
| 1998 | Leslie Cheung | Beast Cops | Johnnie To; A Hero Never Dies | Yau Nai-Hoi; Szeto Kam-Yuen; Chow Hin-Yan (Expect the Unexpected); Jeff Lau (Timeless Romance) | Anthony Wong Chau Sang (Beast Cops) | Sandra Ng (Portland Street Blues) | Troublesome Night 3 Expect the Unexpected; The Longest Nite; Hold You Tight; The Longest Summer; The Storm Riders; A Little Life-Opera; Anna Magdalena; Timeless Romance | |
| 1997 | Edward Yang | Full Alert | Fruit Chan; Made in Hong Kong | Chan Hing-Ka; Task Force | Lau Ching-Wan; Full Alert | Jacklyn Wu; Eighteen Springs | Made in Hong Kong; Happy Together; Lifeline; Task Force; Eighteen Springs; Walk In; A Chinese Ghost Story - The Animation; Too Many Ways to Be No.1; Armageddon | |
| 1996 | Yim Ho | Comrades: Almost a Love Story | Peter Chan (Comrades: Almost a Love Story); Gordon Chan (First Option) | Kwok Wai-Chung; Mongkok Story | Francis Ng; Once Upon a Time in Triad Society | Maggie Cheung; Comrades: Almost a Love Story | Forbidden City Cop; Mongkok Story; First Option; Once Upon a Time in Triad Society; Once Upon a Time in Triad Society 2 Young and Dangerous 3 Lost and Found; Hu-Du-Men | |
| 1995 | Hou Hsiao-hsien | Summer Snow | Derek Yee (Full Throttle) | Jeff Lau (A Chinese Odyssey) | Stephen Chow (A Chinese Odyssey) | Siqin Gaowa (The Day the Sun Turned Cold); Josephine Siao (Summer Snow) | A Chinese Odyssey; The Day the Sun Turned Cold; Full Throttle; Fallen Angels; The Day that Doesn't Exist; The Case of the Cold Fish; The Blade; Once in a Lifetime | |
| 1994 | David Bordwell; Ulrich Gregor; Ann Hui | Ashes of Time | Wong Kar-wai (Ashes of Time) | Wong Kar-wai (Ashes of Time) | Leslie Cheung (Ashes of Time) | Joan Chen (Red Rose, White Rose) | Chungking Express; The Private Eye Blues; Beginner's Luck; Love and the City; Long And Winding Road; The Third Full Moon | |
