= Tempting Heart =

1999 Hong Kong film by Sylvia Chang

- Film poster
- Directed by: Sylvia Chang
- Written by: Sylvia Chang; Cat Kwan
- Produced by: John Chong; Solon So
- Starring: Takeshi Kaneshiro; Gigi Leung; Karen Mok
- Cinematography: Mark Lee Ping-bing
- Edited by: Kwong Chi-Leung
- Music by: Kay Huang
- Production companies: Red on Red Productions; Media Asia Films
- Release date: 23 September 1999 (Hong Kong)
- Running time: 115 minutes
- Country: Hong Kong
- Language: Cantonese
- Box office: HK$12,463,633

Tempting Heart (Chinese: 心動) is a 1999 Hong Kong romantic drama film directed and co-written by Sylvia Chang. It stars Takeshi Kaneshiro and Gigi Leung as a pair of onscreen lovers. The film has a notable titular theme song "Xin Dong", performed by Shino Lin, which became a radio hit and can still be frequently heard on the radio or at karaoke bars/boxes.

The success of Tempting Heart prompted director Johnnie To to cast Kaneshiro and Leung in his 2003 film Turn Left Turn Right.

== Plot ==
Sylvia Chang plays a director who intends to make a romance film and begins to wonder about the role fate plays in relationships. She ends up re-examining her own first love in a completely different light. The story is set in two different periods of time, one in the 1970s where Gigi plays the teenage Xiao-rou, and the other in the 1990s where Sylvia plays the older Xiao-rou.

Takeshi Kaneshiro plays the role of a shy teenager, Ho-jun, who falls in love with Xiao-rou (played by Gigi Leung). Their relationship turns intimate but faces fierce objections from their parents. Karen Mok plays Chen-li, Xiao-rou's best friend, whom Xiao-rou confides in.

This teenage love soon fizzles out owing to misunderstandings and Ho-jun, after many years, turns to marry Chen-li. One day, Chen-li reveals that she is a lesbian and that they both love the same girl – Xiao-rou.

Ho-jun meets Xiao-rou on a trip to Japan and upon knowing that Ho-jun is already married, Xiao-rou returns home and gets herself engaged. Ho-jun manages a last attempt to reunite with Xiao-rou by flying to Hong Kong and telling her that he is already a divorcee, but it is to no avail.

Years later, Xiao-rou finds out that Ho-jun's wife was actually Chen-li. She discovers this only after Chen-li has died. Chen-li leaves a message for Xiao-rou asking her for forgiveness. As Xiao-rou prepares to fly back to Hong Kong from Japan, she receives a present from Ho-jun. In the box were photographs, taken when Ho-jun was thinking about Xiao-rou and of their brief moments of happiness.

It is only at the end of the film when it is tactfully revealed that the director Sylvia Chang was actually re-enacting her own teenage romance.

== Cast ==
- Takeshi Kaneshiro – Ho-jun
- Gigi Leung – Sheo-rou (Xiao-rou)
- Karen Mok – Chen-Li
- Sylvia Chang – Cheryl
- Leon Dai – Ho-jun (middle aged)
- Elaine Jin – Sheo-rou's mom
- Jo Kuk
- Audrey Mak
- William So – Screenwriter
- Michael Tong
- Cher Yeung

== Awards and nominations ==
Awards	Category	Name	Result
36th Golden Horse Awards	Golden Horse Award for Best Narrative Feature		Nominated
36th Golden Horse Awards	Golden Horse Award for Best Supporting Actress	Elaine Jin	Nominated
36th Golden Horse Awards	Golden Horse Award for Best Cinematography	Mark Lee Ping-bing	Nominated
36th Golden Horse Awards	Best Makeup & Costume Design	Yee Chung-man	Nominated
36th Golden Horse Awards	Golden Horse Award for Best Leading Actress	Gigi Leung	Nominated
Hong Kong Film Critics Society Award	Best Actress	Gigi Leung	Nominated
Hong Kong Film Critics Society Award	Films of Merit		Won
Golden Bauhinia Awards	Best Supporting actress	Elaine Jin	Nominated
Golden Bauhinia Awards	Best Supporting actress	Karen Mok	Nominated
Golden Bauhinia Awards	Best Actress	Gigi Leung	Nominated
19th Hong Kong Film Awards	Hong Kong Film Award for Best Actress	Gigi Leung	Nominated
19th Hong Kong Film Awards	Hong Kong Film Award for Best Director	Sylvia Chang	Nominated
19th Hong Kong Film Awards	Hong Kong Film Award for Best Screenplay	Sylvia Chang, Cat Kwan	Won
19th Hong Kong Film Awards	Hong Kong Film Award for Best Supporting Actress	Elaine Jin	Nominated
19th Hong Kong Film Awards	Hong Kong Film Award for Best Art Direction	Man Lim Chung	Won
19th Hong Kong Film Awards	Best Costume Make Up Design	Yee Chung-man	Nominated

== See also ==
- List of Hong Kong films
