= Purple Storm =

Purple Storm may refer to:

- Operation Purple Storm, a series of US Military exercises in Panama in 1989
- Purple Storm (film), a 1999 Hong Kong action film
