= Bullets Over Summer =

1999 Hong Kong film by Wilson Yip

- Film poster
- Traditional Chinese: 爆裂刑警
- Simplified Chinese: 爆裂刑警
- Hanyu Pinyin: Bào Liè Xing Jǐng
- Jyutping: Baau3 Lit6 Jing4 Ging2
- Directed by: Wilson Yip
- Written by: Matt Chow; Wilson Yip; Ben Cheung
- Produced by: Joe Ma
- Starring: Francis Ng; Louis Koo
- Cinematography: Lam Wah-chuen
- Edited by: Cheung Ka-fai
- Music by: Tommy Wai
- Production companies: Mei Ah Film Production; Brilliant Idea Group
- Distributed by: Mei Ah Entertainment
- Release date: 5 August 1999
- Running time: 98 minutes
- Country: Hong Kong
- Language: Cantonese
- Box office: HK$2,193,045

Bullets Over Summer is a 1999 Hong Kong buddy cop action film directed by Wilson Yip and starring Francis Ng and Louis Koo. For their performances in the film, Ng and Law Lan were awarded Best Actor and Best Actress respectively at the 6th Hong Kong Film Critics Society Awards while Law was also awarded Best Actress at the 19th Hong Kong Film Awards and Best Supporting Actress at the 5th Golden Bauhinia Awards.

== Plot ==
Police officers Mike Lai (Francis Ng) and Brian Leung (Louis Koo) are partners and good friends. Mike is withdrawn and quiet while Brian is very cynical and is not appreciated by superiors. In order to arrest a group of robbers led by Dragon (Joe Lee), Mike and Brian set up a monitoring device in Granny's (Law Lan) apartment. At this time, Mike became acquainted with Jennifer (Stephanie Lam), a pregnant woman who was abandoned by her boyfriend. Mike, who grew up in an orphanage, expressed his willingness to be the father of Jennifer's child. On the other hand, Brian also meets a schoolgirl named Yen (Michelle Saram). Not long after, Mike discovers he was suffering from a terminal genetic illness and is running out of time. Mike makes a trading deal with Dragon where he obtains a large sum of money for Jennifer to support herself and her child in the future. At the same time, he does not forget his responsibilities as a police officer and notifies Brian the whereabouts of Dragon. Together, Mike and Brian start a battle against Dragon to take him down.

== Cast ==
- Francis Ng as Mike Lai
- Louis Koo as Brian Leung
- Law Lan as Granny
- Michelle Saram as Yen
- Stephanie Lam as Jennifer Yuen
- Wayne Lai as Stone
- David Lee as Prince
- Lo Mang as suspect under surveillance
- Joe Lee as Dragon
- Matt Chow as Granny's neighbor
- Hau Woon-ling as Jennifer's customer
- Wenders Li as convenient store robber
- Tony Ho as robber with beret
- Kenny Wong as robber
- Roderick Lam as robber
- Gary Mak as policeman
- Ng Shui-ting as policeman
- Ankee Leung
- Andy Tsang as food delivery boy in lift
- Yuen Man-chun as security guard
- Chow Pok-fu

== Box office ==
The film grossed HK$2,193,045 in its theatrical run in Hong Kong from 5 August to 8 September 1999.

== Awards and nominations ==
Awards and nominations
Ceremony	Category	Recipient	Outcome
6th Hong Kong Film Critics Society Awards	Best Actor	Francis Ng	Won
6th Hong Kong Film Critics Society Awards	Best Actress	Law Lan	Won
6th Hong Kong Film Critics Society Awards	Best Screenplay	Matt Chow, Wilson Yip, Ben Cheung	Won
6th Hong Kong Film Critics Society Awards	Film of Merit	Bullets Over Summer	Won
19th Hong Kong Film Awards	Best Actor	Francis Ng	Nominated
19th Hong Kong Film Awards	Best Actress	Law Lan	Won
19th Hong Kong Film Awards	Best Sound Design	Cuson Liu, Phyllis Cheng	Nominated
5th Golden Bauhinia Awards	Best Supporting Actress	Law Lan	Won
