= Golden Bauhinia Awards =

Hong Kong film award

The Golden Bauhinia Awards (simplified Chinese: 金紫荆奖; traditional Chinese: 金紫荊獎) were Hong Kong film awards organised by the Hong Kong Film Critics Association. Its first award presentation ceremony took place in 1996.

The award attracted controversy in 2007, when ten nominations were given to Pang Ho-Cheung’s Exodus before it had been screened anywhere publicly and the Best Film Award was shared by three movies. Its credibility under intense scrutiny, the association decided to suspend the award until further notice.

== Awards ceremonies ==
Year	Best Film	Best Director	Best Actor	Best Actress	Best Supporting actor	Best Supporting actress	Best Screenplay	Best Cinematography	Life Achievement Award
1996	Summer Snow	Ann Hui (Summer Snow)	Stephen Chow (A Chinese Odyssey); Roy Chiao (Summer Snow)	Josephine Siao (Summer Snow)	Chin Kar-lok (Full Throttle)	Karen Mok (Fallen Angels)	Chan Man-Keung (Summer Snow)	Christopher Doyle (Fallen Angels)	Shih Kien
1997	Comrades, Almost a Love Story	Peter Chan (Comrades, Almost a Love Story)	Kent Cheng (The Log)	Maggie Cheung (Comrades, Almost a Love Story)	Eric Tsang (Comrades, Almost a Love Story)	Shu Qi (Viva Erotica)	Ivy Ho (Comrades, Almost a Love Story)	Jingle Ma (Comrades, Almost a Love Story)	Chang Cheh
1998	Made in Hong Kong	Fruit Chan (Made in Hong Kong)	Tony Leung Chiu-Wai (Happy Together)	Carina Lau (Intimates)	Francis Ng (Too Many Ways to Be No. 1)	Anita Mui (Eighteen Springs)	Wai Ka-Fai, Matt Chow, Szeto Kam-Yuen (Too Many Ways to Be No. 1)	Christopher Doyle (Happy Together)	Lo Tun (盧敦)
1999	Beast Cops	Gordon Chan, Dante Lam (Beast Cops)	Anthony Wong Chau Sang (Beast Cops)	Sandra Ng (Portland Street Blues)	Patrick Tam Yiu Man (Beast Cops)	Shu Qi (City of Glass)	Yau Nai-Hoi, Szeto Kam-Yuen, Chow Hin-Yan (Expect the Unexpected)	Jingle Ma (City of Glass)	Wu Pang (胡鵬)
2000	The Mission	Johnnie To (The Mission)	Sean Lau (Where a Good Man Goes); Anthony Wong Chau Sang (Ordinary Heroes)	Loletta Lee (Ordinary Heroes)	Roy Cheung (The Mission)	Law Lan (Bullets Over Summer)	Yip Kam-Hung (Metade Fumaca); Yau Nai-Hoi (Running Out of Time)	Cheng Siu-Keung (The Mission)	Paw Fong (鮑方)
2001	Crouching Tiger, Hidden Dragon	Ang Lee (Crouching Tiger, Hidden Dragon)	Andy Lau (A Fighter's Blues)	Qin Hailu (秦海璐) (Durian Durian)	Francis Ng (2000 AD)	Zhang Ziyi (Crouching Tiger, Hidden Dragon)	Fruit Chan (Durian Durian)	Christopher Doyle, Pin Bing Lee (In the Mood for Love)	Cho Tat Wah
2002	Shaolin Soccer	Stephen Chow (Shaolin Soccer)	Hu Jun (Lan Yu)	Sylvia Chang (Forever and Ever)	Wong Yat Fei (黃一飛) (Shaolin Soccer)	Josie Ho (Forever and Ever)	Vincent Kok, Pang Ho-Cheung (You Shoot, I Shoot)	Chung Yau Tim (鍾有添) (Peony Pavilion)	Wong Tin-Lam
2003	Infernal Affairs	Andrew Lau, Alan Mak (Infernal Affairs)	Tony Leung Chiu-Wai (Infernal Affairs)	Angelica Lee (The Eye)	Anthony Wong Chau Sang (Infernal Affairs)	Karena Lam (July Rhapsody)	Felix Chong, Alan Mak (Infernal Affairs)	Christopher Doyle (Hero)	Wu Fung
2004	PTU	Johnnie To; PTU	Simon Yam; PTU	Cecilia Cheung; Lost in Time	Lam Suet; PTU	Maggie Shiu; PTU	Yau Nai-Hoi, Au Kin-Yee; PTU	Arthur Wong (戀之風景)	Patrick Tse
2005	Kung Fu Hustle	Derek Yee (One Nite in Mongkok)	Tony Leung Chiu-Wai (2046)	Rene Liu (A World Without Thieves)	Yuen Wah (Kung Fu Hustle)	Bai Ling (Dumplings)	Pang Ho-Cheung (Beyond Our Ken)	Christopher Doyle (2046)	Lau Kar Leung
2006	Election	Peter Chan (Perhaps Love)	Simon Yam (Election)	Zhou Xun (Perhaps Love)	Anthony Wong Chau Sang (Initial D)	Teresa Mo (2 Young)	Yau Nai-Hoi, Yip Tin-Shing (Election)	Peter Pau (Perhaps Love)	Yu Mo Won (余慕雲)
2007	Exiled; After This Our Exile; A Battle of Wits	Johnnie To (Exiled)	Sean Lau (My Name is Fame)	Gong Li (Curse of the Golden Flower); Charlene Choi (Simply Actors)	Gouw Ian Iskandar (After This Our Exile)	Zhou Xun (The Banquet)	Patrick Tam (After This Our Exile)	Andrew Lau (Confession of Pain)	Ti Lung
