= A Wicked Ghost III: The Possession =

2002 Hong Kong film by Stanley Tong

- DVD cover art
- 山村老屍3:惡靈纏身
- Directed by: Hung Chung-hap
- Written by: Gor Yi
- Produced by: Stanley Tong
- Starring: Gigi Lai; Cheung Tat-ming; Grace Lam; Yip Sai Wing; Wayne Lai; Patrick Keung; Jenny Yam; Joyce Han
- Cinematography: Wong Shek-wah
- Edited by: Chan Sing-yan
- Music by: Mak Chun-hung
- Production company: Matrix Productions
- Distributed by: Universe Films Distribution
- Release date: 2002
- Running time: 87 minutes
- Country: Hong Kong
- Language: Cantonese

A Wicked Ghost III: The Possession (山村老屍3:惡靈纏身) is a 2002 Hong Kong horror film produced by Stanley Tong, directed by Hung Chung-hap and starring Gigi Lai, Cheung Tat-ming, Grace Lam, Yip Sai Wing, Wayne Lai, Patrick Keung, Jenny Yam, and Joyce Han. It is preceded by A Wicked Ghost in 1999 and A Wicked Ghost II: The Fear in 2000.

== Synopsis ==
May, a film producer's assistant, finds a spirit tablet in an outdoor filming location. She takes it with her to prevent it from being damaged, but strange things start happening to her friends. They either die or sustain serious injuries. Eventually, she realises that there is a vengeful spirit attached to the tablet and it is leading her towards death in order to complete its desire when it was still alive.

== Cast ==
- Gigi Lai as Catherine / Ding-dong Taoist
- Cheung Tat-ming as Bibi
- Grace Lam as May
- Yip Sai Wing as Tom Cool
- Wayne Lai as Leung Kam-chung
- Patrick Keung as Wong Chou-shui
- Jenny Yam as Fiona
- Joyce Han as Dazy
