= A Wicked Ghost II: The Fear =

2000 Hong Kong film by Francis Nam

- DVD cover art
- 山村老屍2:色之惡鬼
- Directed by: Francis Nam
- Written by: Leung Hung-wah; Mickey Man
- Produced by: Leung Hung-wah
- Starring: Joey Meng; Angie Cheung; Alice Chan; Ken Wong; Joyce Chan
- Cinematography: Yip Wai-ying
- Edited by: Ng Wang-hung
- Music by: Simon Leung; Tony Tam
- Production companies: Times Production; Matrix Productions
- Release date: 21 September 2000
- Running time: 81 minutes
- Country: Hong Kong
- Language: Cantonese
- Box office: HK$407,346

A Wicked Ghost II: The Fear (山村老屍2:色之惡鬼) is a 2000 Hong Kong horror film directed by Francis Nam, starring Joey Meng, Angie Cheung, Alice Chan, Ken Wong, and Joyce Chan. It is preceded by A Wicked Ghost in 1999 and followed by A Wicked Ghost III: The Possession in 2002.

== Synopsis ==
Three police officers (Li, Peanut and Cha-siu) attempt to arrest a serial rapist but he escapes and flees to a construction site, where he is found dead later with his body dismembered. Cha-siu had also shot himself in the head. The mysterious deaths baffle Li, Peanut, and their colleague Willis Tao. The case also attracts the attention of two reporters (Balm and Coffee) and Blue, a writer of supernatural stories.

Balm encounters the rapist's ghost and gets knocked down by a car. Peanut's cousin Ada blinds herself after watching A Wicked Ghost, claiming she saw a ghost similar to the one in the movie. Balm and Ada commit suicide later. Ada's sister Clever also attempts suicide after seeing the ghosts of the twin girls she had aborted, but is saved by a blessed coin. Willis Tao goes into a trance after stealing a metal nail from the construction site and tries to kill his colleagues, but they subdue him and send him to hospital.

Blue retrieves a special sound recorder she gave to Ada earlier that can record sounds inaudible to the human ear. She plays it and hears a hoarse female voice calling out the name of Peanut's great-grandmother, Hwa Yuet-may, who used to live where the construction site is. Peanut and Li suspect that they might be the reincarnations of Peanut's great-grandparents after seeing the resemblance in an old photo. One night, Blue takes Peanut and Li to the construction site to hypnotise them and help them recall their past lives. Coffee and Clever join them.

Under hypnosis, Peanut and Li learn that her great-grandfather loved a woman called Tift, but was forced to marry Hwa, who was from a rich family. Hwa was so jealous of Tift that she hired thugs to kidnap Tift and rape her before chopping off her limbs. Peanut's great-grandfather could not bear to see his lover being tormented so he killed himself. Tift was ultimately stabbed in the head by Suet, her friend who betrayed her. She became a vengeful ghost after death and sought vengeance on Hwa and her descendants.

When Peanut recovers from her trance, she realises that Coffee was Suet in her past life. In the meantime, Tift's ghost has possessed Blue and she corners Peanut and Coffee and tries to strangle them to death. Just then, Clever manages to trap Tift by shining spiritual lights on her. At this critical moment, the ghost of Peanut's great-grandfather leaves Li's body and saves Tift. Tift gives up her desire for revenge after reuniting with her lover and they leave together.

== Cast ==
- Joey Meng as Blue / Tift
- Alice Chan as Peanut / Hwa Yuet-may
- Ken Wong as Inspector Li / Peanut's great-grandfather
- Angie Cheung as Coffee / Suet
- Joyce Chan as Clever
- Isa Chow as Ada
- Wu Kai-kong as Willis Tao
- Man Yeung as suspect
- Tang Wing-san as Officer Hwang
- Lee Kin-yan as Balm
