= Timeless Romance =

1998 Hong Kong film by Jeffrey Lau and David Lai

- DVD cover
- Traditional Chinese: 超時空要愛
- Simplified Chinese: 超时空要爱
- Hanyu Pinyin: Chāo Shí Kōng Yào Ài
- Jyutping: Ciu1 Si4 Hung1 Jiu3 Oi3
- Directed by: David Lai; Jeffrey Lau
- Written by: Jeffrey Lau
- Produced by: Jeffrey Lau; Liu Tang-Fong
- Starring: Tony Leung; Theresa Lee; Tats Lau
- Cinematography: Edmond Fung; Paul Yip Pak-Ying
- Edited by: Hai Kit-Wai
- Music by: Tats Lau
- Production company: Denhem Wealth Holdings Limited
- Release date: 5 March 1998
- Running time: 95 minutes
- Country: Hong Kong
- Language: Cantonese

Timeless Romance is a 1998 Hong Kong romantic comedy film directed by Jeffrey Lau and David Lai, starring Tony Leung Chiu-wai. It won "Best Screenplay" and "Film of Merit" at the 1999 Hong Kong Film Critics Society Awards.

== Cast ==
- Tony Leung
- Theresa Lee
- Tats Lau
