= Heart for Heaven =

- Poster
- Chinese: 一念天堂
- Directed by: Zhang Cheng
- Production companies: Beijing Tianhe Shengyan Media; Kaide Shengshi (Beijing) Investment
- Distributed by: Beijing Tianhe Shengyan Media
- Release date: December 31, 2015
- Running time: 102 minutes
- Country: China
- Language: Mandarin
- Box office: US$11.7 million

Heart for Heaven is a 2015 Chinese comedy film directed by Zhang Cheng. It was released in China on December 31, 2015.

== Plot ==
Shen Mo loves acting. With his superb acting skills, he has helped the police solve many cases. During a routine physical examination, Shen Mo learned that he was terminally ill. Knowing that he had not much time left, he began to seriously think about the meaning of life for the first time. He decided to use his acting talent to do something valuable in the last days, just as his farewell performance in life.

Shen Mo and his partner Du Yu went deep into a large community with mixed fish and dragons, broke into the hidden fraud gangs and counterfeit drug gangs, and began to collect evidence of their crimes. In the process, Shen Mo met Ma Xiaoli, an optimistic and simple network anchor, and included Ma Xiaoli in his plan. Unexpectedly, an accident happened at this time. Du Yu fell in love with Xiao Wei, the lover of the black rich man Long Ge. When Long Ge learned about this, he was furious and hired the Japanese killer Henggang Yuanpeng to kill Du Yu and Xiao Wei at a high price. Shen Mo and Ma Xiaoli were also involved, and danger was gradually approaching.

== Cast ==
- Shen Teng
- Mary Ma
- Du Xiaoyu
- Lam Suet
- Wang Zizi
- Marc
- Su Zhidan
- Xu Ruoqi

== Reception ==
The film grossed US$11.7 million on its opening at the Chinese box office.
