= Fly Me to Polaris =

1999 Hong Kong film by Jingle Ma

- Film poster
- Traditional Chinese: 星願
- Simplified Chinese: 星愿
- Hanyu Pinyin: Xīng Yuàn
- Jyutping: Sing1 Jyun6
- Directed by: Jingle Ma
- Screenplay by: Law Chi-leung; Yeung Sin-ling
- Produced by: David Chan
- Starring: Richie Jen; Cecilia Cheung; William So
- Cinematography: Chan Kwok-Hung; Jingle Ma
- Edited by: Kwong Chi-leung
- Music by: Peter Kam
- Production companies: Golden Harvest; GH Pictures; Deltamac Films; Sil-Metropole Organisation; Jayline Limited
- Distributed by: Gala Film Distribution
- Release date: 21 August 1999
- Running time: 96 minutes
- Country: Hong Kong
- Language: Cantonese
- Box office: HK$12,040,675

Fly Me to Polaris is a 1999 Hong Kong romantic fantasy film directed by Jingle Ma and starring Richie Jen and Cecilia Cheung.

== Plot ==
The plots focuses on the character Onion (Jen) who became blind and mute during his childhood. Onion works at a hospital transcribing documents into braille for blind patients. His work allows him to live in the hospital dorm and get health checks from Dr. Woo (So). We learn that Onion always gets his haircut by Autumn (Cheung) whose first impression was full of apologies for being late and she was very clumsy. One time, she accidentally cut Onion's ear, but Onion never got mad. Instead he tried to console her and joke with her. Gradually they became close and Autumn gave Onion his nickname "Onion" because after the haircut, she said he looks like an onion head. One day, Onion and Autumn were hanging out on the rooftop of the hospital and she told Onion excitedly about a meteor shower that is about to happen in a few days and how they should each make a wish. Onion later accompanied Autumn back to the dormitories for her to get ready for her night shift. Before parting, Onion asks Autumn out on a date and when she says yes, he becomes really happy. He trips over a rock running into the street and is hit by a car. The death of Onion made Autumn realize that she was really deeply in love with him.

Because he was the six billionth human to die and depart to Polaris, Onion is granted a wish. He wishes to return to Earth. But there is a limit of five days. Unfortunately the rules stipulate that he cannot tell anyone who he really is and that, at the same time, his face will be different, so he will not be recognized as Onion by his former friends.

Upon returning to Earth, Onion wakes up in the storage of the same hospital he used to work at. After changing into overalls, Onion sets out exploring the hospital grounds taking in the sights. Finally able to speak to his colleagues, Onion soon learns from a nurse that Autumn has left the grounds to attend the funeral of a dear friend. That dear friend turns out to be Onion himself. At the funeral, Onion sees an inconsolable Autumn with Dr. Woo by her side. After the funeral, Onion discovers an insurance broker's business card in his secret storage in his dorm. The name on the card reads "Cheuk Ji Mun". Posing as Cheuk Ji Mun, a life insurance broker, Onion tries to get close to Autumn again by posing as a friend of Onion. But his approach is all wrong and only gets Autumn mad at him. When he finds her being courted by Dr. Woo, he wastes a few days trying to tell her who he really is, even writing a card and voice recording himself, but the rules keep stopping him with epileptic effects, a smudged out card, and an empty recording. Just when he was about to give up, he discovers that he can share his memories with Autumn indirectly by narrating Onion's life story via Onion's diary. But that ended up hurting Autumn more as her memories about Onion come flooding back, overwhelming her. Onion then makes the most of the time he has remaining with her by being her guardian angel, secretly helping her with hospital duties, loading her grocery cart with her favourite candy, and serenading her with his saxophone outside her dorm window just like he has always done in the past. His action made Autumn feel like Onion has come back to her. But where is he?

Towards the end of Onion's stay, Autumn slowly realizes that he is Onion. But by that time, there are only few minutes left until the meteor showers, flying him back to Polaris.

== Cast ==
- Richie Jen as Onion / Cheuk
- Cecilia Cheung as Autumn Yue
- William So as Dr. Woo
- Eric Tsang as Jumboball
- Eric Kot as Angel
- Sheren Tang as Autumn's sister
- Sandy Lamb as Radio program host
- Isabel Chan as Nurse Joe Chan
- Wong Chi-choi as Mr. Wong
- Lam Chui-fung as Nurse Chow
- Chan Po-chun as Hospital canteen waiter
- Max Yip as Cra driver in accident
- Lai Wing-san as Car passenger in accident
- Cheung Yue-lee as Little boy patient
- Ng Hoi-ying as Little girl patient
- Macy Yik as Little girl patient's mom
- Yiu Nag-si as Nurse
- Oh Ho-yue as Fat nurse
- Chan Man-yiu as Rude passerby in suit
- Wong Wai-chuen as Taxi driver
- Lam Wai-lun as Angel's assistant
- Audrey Mak as Chubs

== Awards ==
Awards and nominations
Ceremony	Category	Recipient	Outcome
19th Hong Kong Film Awards	Best Film	Fly Me to Polaris	Nominated
19th Hong Kong Film Awards	Best Actress	Cheung Pak Chi	Nominated
19th Hong Kong Film Awards	Best New Performer	Cheung Pak Chi	Won
19th Hong Kong Film Awards	Best New Performer	Richie Jen	Nominated
19th Hong Kong Film Awards	Best Cinematography	Jingle Ma, Chan Kwok-Hung	Nominated
19th Hong Kong Film Awards	Best Original Film Score	Peter Kam	Won
19th Hong Kong Film Awards	Best Original Film Song	Song: Xing Yu Xin Yuan (星語心願) Composer: Peter Kam; Lyricist: Ko Suet-nam; Singer: Cecilia Cheung	Won
19th Hong Kong Film Awards	Best Original Film Song	Song: Candle Light Composer/Lyricist: Poon Hip-hing; Singer: Richie Jen	Nominated

== See also ==
- Heaven Can Wait, a 1943 film directed by Ernst Lubitsch
- A Matter of Life and Death, a 1946 film directed by Michael Powell and Emeric Pressburger
- Always, a 1989 film directed by Steven Spielberg
- Ghost, a 1990 film directed by Jerry Zucker
