= Dora Ng =

Hong Kong costume designer

Dora Ng Lei-Lo (吳里璐) is a Hong Kong film costume and make up designer. In June 2025, Ng was invited to join the Costume Designers Branch of the Academy of Motion Picture Arts and Sciences.

== Filmography ==
- An Empress and the Warriors (2008)
- CJ7 (2008)
- The Secret of the Magic Gourd (2007)
- The Matrimony (2007)
- Happy Birthday (2007)
- Re-cycle (2006)
- Perhaps Love (2005)
- Seoul Raiders (2005)
- Dumplings and Three... Extremes (2004)
- Three (2002)
- Tokyo Raiders (2000)
- Lavender (2000)
- Skyline Raiders (2000)
- Purple Storm (1999)
- Gorgeous (1999)
- Metade Fumaca (1999)
- Hot War (1998)
- Hero (1997)
- Comrades: Almost a Love Story (1996)
- Who's the Woman, Who's the Man? (1996)
- Peace Hotel (1995)
- He's a Woman, She's a Man (1994)
