= Metade Fumaca =

1999 Hong Kong film by Riley Yip

- DVD cover
- Traditional Chinese: 半支煙
- Simplified Chinese: 半支烟
- Hanyu Pinyin: Bàn Zhī Yān
- Jyutping: Bun3 Zi1 Jin1
- Directed by: Riley Yip
- Written by: Riley Yip
- Produced by: Solon So; John Chong; Claudie Chung
- Starring: Eric Tsang; Nicholas Tse; Shu Qi; Kelly Chen
- Cinematography: Peter Pau
- Edited by: Maurice Li
- Music by: Duck Lau; Chiu Tsang-hei
- Production companies: Media Asia Films; United Filmmakers Organisation (UFO)
- Distributed by: Golden Harvest; Media Asia Distributions
- Release date: 5 November 1999
- Running time: 101 minutes
- Country: Hong Kong
- Language: Cantonese

Metade Fumaca (Chinese: 半支煙; literally: Half cigarette) is a 1999 Hong Kong drama film directed by Riley Yip and starring Eric Tsang and Nicholas Tse.

== Cast ==
- Eric Tsang as Roy 'Mountain Leopard'
- Nicholas Tse as Smokey
- Shu Qi as Nam
- Kelly Chen as Policewoman
- Sandra Ng as Third Sister
- Anthony Wong Chau-sang as Brother Kei
- Terence Yin as Brother Chai
- Stephen Fung as Young Roy
- Sam Lee as Young Nine Dragons
- Elaine Jin as Smokey's mother
- Jo Kuk as Dee Dee
- Michael Chan as Older Nine Dragons
- Vincent Kok as White Hair Tiger
- Stephen Tung as Assassin (flashback)
- Cheung Tat-ming as Master Twelve
- Tony Ho as Mad Dog Wah
- Wan Yeung-ming as Brother Wah

== Accolades ==
Accolades
| Ceremony | Category | Recipient | Outcome |
|---|---|---|---|
| 19th Hong Kong Film Awards | Best Screenplay | Riley Yip | Nominated |
| 19th Hong Kong Film Awards | Best Actor | Eric Tsang | Nominated |
| 19th Hong Kong Film Awards | Best Supporting Actress | Elaine Jin | Nominated |
| 19th Hong Kong Film Awards | Best Cinematography | Peter Pau | Nominated |
| 19th Hong Kong Film Awards | Best Art Direction | Wong Bing-yiu | Nominated |
| 19th Hong Kong Film Awards | Best Costume & Make Up Design | Dora Ng | Nominated |
| 19th Hong Kong Film Awards | Best Original Film Song | Song: Love for the Rest of Life (愛後餘生) Composer: Ronald Ng; Lyricist: Lin Xi; Singer: Nicholas Tse | Nominated |
