= The Mission (1999 film) =

1999 Hong Kong film by Johnnie To

- Film poster
- Directed by: Johnnie To
- Written by: Yau Nai-hoi; Milkyway Creative Team
- Produced by: Johnnie To
- Starring: Anthony Wong; Francis Ng; Jackie Lui; Roy Cheung; Lam Suet; Simon Yam
- Cinematography: Cheng Siu-Keung
- Edited by: Chan Chi-wai
- Music by: Chung Chi-wing
- Production company: Milkyway Image
- Distributed by: International Films Enterprise Ltd.
- Release date: 19 November 1999
- Running time: 84 minutes
- Country: Hong Kong
- Language: Cantonese
- Box office: HK$4,618,846

The Mission (Chinese: 鎗火, jyutping: Coeng1 Fo2, lit. The Gunfire) is a 1999 Hong Kong action film produced and directed by Johnnie To, and starring Anthony Wong, Francis Ng, Jackie Lui, Lam Suet, and Simon Yam.

== Plot ==
Triad boss Lung survives an assassination attempt in a restaurant in which one of his men is killed. The restaurant is owned by "Fat Cheung", an underboss of Lung's triad.

To ensure his safety, Lung's right hand man and brother, Frank, has hired five bodyguards to stay close to their boss 24/7: Curtis, a retired veteran of the triad who was living a normal life as a hairdresser; James, a loner and the firearms expert of the five; Roy, a rising capo and his quick-witted underling Shin; and Mike, a former pimp and sharpshooter.

An initial assassination attempt on Lung fails when a sniper attacks the cars with Lung and his bodyguards from the rooftop of a high-rise. Lung gets shot, but a bullet-proof vest prevents further damage. The men manage to fight off the attack and Curtis decides to leave in the cars with Lung, James, Mike and Shin even though Roy hasn't returned (he left the scene to pursue a second attacker). Roy returns angrily in a taxi to Lung's house and beats up Curtis (who doesn't oppose). The next day Curtis makes amends by killing a criminal who harassed Roy's night club.

The five bodyguards are fighting off two additional assassination attempts and trail a surviving hitman to the hideout of the attackers. After a gunfight they manage to capture one of the assassins alive. It becomes evident that the hits were contracted by Fat Cheung and Lung sends his henchmen Frank to kill him. The bodyguards kill the captured hitman and the five men celebrate the end of their mission in a restaurant.

Frank hands out five envelopes with the pay to Curtis and tells him that he learnt about an affair between Shin and the wife of Lung. He requests that Shin be executed and Curtis tells him that he'll handle it. Curtis drives to James, asks him for a gun and arranges a meeting with Shin in the evening. James warns Roy and since he's responsible for Shin as his boss, he confronts him with the allegation. Shin confesses having been seduced by Mrs. Lung. Roy tells Curtis that he can't allow for Shin to be killed. They form the plan to have Shin escape in a boat to Taiwan but eventually discard the plan since Frank would then pursue Roy and the rest of them for failing instead.

In the evening the five men meet in an otherwise empty restaurant to sort out the situation. James leaves to ask Lung for clemency and to spare Shin's life. When he arrives at Lung's house he witnesses a henchmen of Lung killing the unfaithful Mrs. Lung. James realizes the hopelessness of his attempt and returns to the restaurant where it comes to a Mexican standoff between the men. Curtis shoots Shin, while Roy empties his magazine without aiming at Curtis. When the men leave the restaurant, Curtis throws a blank towards James, thus revealing that the death of Shin (who escapes through the backdoor) was staged for Lung.

== Cast ==
- Anthony Wong as Curtis
- Francis Ng as Roy
- Jackie Lui as Shin
- Roy Cheung as Mike
- Lam Suet as James
- Simon Yam as Frank
- Wong Tin Lan as Fat Cheung
- Eddy Ko as Ko Hung Lung
- Elaine Eca Da Silva as Mrs Lung
- Ai Wai as Inspector Fung
- Paco Yick as Assassin 1
- Keiji Sato as Assassin 2
- Law Wing-cheung as Curtis's subordinate

== Production ==
According to To, they shot the film in 18 days.

== Reception ==
The Mission was well received. The review aggregator Rotten Tomatoes reported that 60% of critics have given the film a positive review based on 5 reviews, with an average rating of 5.56/10. In a 2004 interview with director Johnnie To for the website GreenCine, Sean Axmaker states that The Mission is "the best crime film to come from Hong Kong in years. It's austere and still, beautifully composed and tense, and the characters are professional and efficient, positioning themselves for efficiency and communicating and interacting silently while on the job."

Similarly, an overview of To's body of work that precedes an interview for the magazine Cinéaste refers to the film as "To's masterpiece" and "a brilliantly conceived, shot, and edited gangster film."

In 2014, Time Out polled several film critics, directors, actors and stunt actors to list their top action films. The Mission was listed at 86th place on this list.

== Awards and nominations ==
Awards and nominations
Ceremony	Category	Recipient	Outcome
37th Golden Horse Awards	Best Feature Film	The Mission	Nominated
37th Golden Horse Awards	Best Director	Johnnie To	Won
37th Golden Horse Awards	Best Actor	Francis Ng	Won
37th Golden Horse Awards	Best Supporting Actor	Lam Suet	Nominated
19th Hong Kong Film Awards	Best Film	The Mission	Nominated
19th Hong Kong Film Awards	Best Director	Johnnie To	Won
19th Hong Kong Film Awards	Best Supporting Actor	Lam Suet	Nominated
19th Hong Kong Film Awards	Best Action Choreography	Cheng Ka-sang	Nominated
19th Hong Kong Film Awards	Best Film Editing	Chan Chi-wai	Nominated
19th Hong Kong Film Awards	Best Original Film Score	Chung Chi-wing	Nominated
6th Hong Kong Film Critics Society Awards	Best Film	The Mission	Won
6th Hong Kong Film Critics Society Awards	Best Director	Johnnie To	Won
5th Golden Bauhinia Awards	Best Film	The Mission	Won
5th Golden Bauhinia Awards	Best Director	Johnnie To	Won
5th Golden Bauhinia Awards	Best Supporting Actor	Roy Cheung	Won
5th Golden Bauhinia Awards	Best Cinematography	Cheng Siu-Keung	Won
5th Golden Bauhinia Awards	Top Ten Chinese-language Film	The Mission	Won
HKSAR 10th Anniversary Film Awards	Best Film	The Mission	Nominated
HKSAR 10th Anniversary Film Awards	Best Director	Johnnie To	Won
1st Chinese Film Media Awards	Best Screenplay	Yau Nai-hoi	Won
