= A Wicked Ghost =

1999 Hong Kong film by Leung Hung-wah

- Film poster
- Traditional Chinese: 山村老屍
- Simplified Chinese: 山村老尸
- Hanyu Pinyin: Shān Cūn Lǎo Shī
- Jyutping: Saan1 Cyun1 Lou5 Si1
- Directed by: Leung Hung-wah
- Written by: Leung Hung-wah
- Produced by: Leung Hung-wah
- Starring: Francis Ng; Gigi Lai; Gabriel Harrison; Edward Mok; Nelson Ngai; Celia Sze
- Cinematography: Ally Wong
- Edited by: Ng Wang-hung
- Music by: Simon Leung
- Production company: Times Production Ltd.
- Distributed by: Universe Films Distribution Co. Ltd.
- Release date: 4 November 1999
- Running time: 85 minutes
- Country: Hong Kong
- Language: Cantonese

A Wicked Ghost is a 1999 Hong Kong horror film directed by Leung Hung-wah, starring Francis Ng, Gigi Lai, Gabriel Harrison, Edward Mok, Nelson Ngai and Celia Sze. It was followed by A Wicked Ghost II: The Fear in 2000 and A Wicked Ghost III: The Possession in 2002.

== Plot ==
Annie and three friends play a game of "contacting ghosts". While they are playing, Ming, Annie's boyfriend who is not involved in the game, sees a ghost and immediately stops them. After the three friends die under mysterious circumstances, Ming's sister, Cissy, is worried that something will happen to Ming, so she seeks help from her friend, Fa-mo, a drama teacher. In the meantime, Annie is possessed by a ghost, who tells Ming that Annie has three days to live.

After doing some research, Ming and Fa-mo travel to an abandoned village and find Lee Keung, an old man who grew up there. He tells them about Cho Yan-may, a Cantonese opera singer who was framed for adultery and killed by the villagers. In the three days after her death, Cho's vengeful ghost caused 66 villagers to die in unnatural ways.

While drinking from a freshwater pool near the village, they see Cho's ghost in the water and believe that Cho's remains have ended up in the pool. Fa-mo and Ming figure out that Cho's ghost can "pollute" the water in the freshwater pool with her vengeful aura and cause people who drink from it to experience hallucinations and kill themselves. They manage to stop Cissy's fiancé, Jack, who is in a trance, from forcing Cissy to drink the water.

When Ming dives into the pool to find Cho's remains, he passes through a supernatural portal and finds her body. She strangles him to death and his dead body surfaces. Upon realising that Ming is dead, Fa-mo rushes back to Jack's home and drinks the "polluted" water so that he can see Cho's ghost and confront her. When he hugs Cissy, whom he has a crush on, she transforms into Cho. He realises that it is an illusion, so he embraces her tightly. Thinking that they truly love each other, Cho's ghost spares them and disappears. When Jack regains consciousness, he is unhappy to see Fa-mo embracing his fiancée. Cho's ghost suddenly appears beside him and he screams.

== Cast ==
- Francis Ng as Fa-mo
- Gigi Lai as Cissy
- Gabriel Harrison as Ming
- Edward Mok as Jack
- Chow Yan-yan as Cho Yan-may
- Nelson Ngai as Cho's husband
- Celia Sze as Annie
- Lui Tat as Lee Keung
  - Cheung Yue-lee as Lee Keung (boy)
- Lam Suk-yan as Biggie
- Joseph Tang as Rubbish
- Man Yeung as Big-B
