= Running Out of Time (1999 film) =

1999 Hong Kong film by Johnnie To

- Film poster

Chinese name
- Traditional Chinese: 暗戰
- Simplified Chinese: 暗战
Transcriptions
Standard Mandarin
- Hanyu Pinyin: Àn Zhàn
Yue: Cantonese
- Jyutping: Am3 Zin3
- Directed by: Johnnie To
- Written by: Yau Nai-hoi; Laurent Courtiaud; Julien Carbon
- Produced by: Johnnie To
- Starring: Andy Lau; Sean Lau
- Cinematography: Cheng Siu-Keung
- Edited by: Andy Chan
- Music by: Raymond Wong
- Production companies: Win's Entertainment; Milkyway Image
- Distributed by: China Star Entertainment Group
- Release date: 23 September 1999
- Running time: 93 minutes
- Country: Hong Kong
- Language: Cantonese
- Box office: HK$14,651,824

Running Out of Time (Chinese: 暗戰; literal title: Hidden War) is a 1999 Hong Kong action thriller film produced and directed by Johnnie To and starring Andy Lau as a cancer-ridden criminal who challenges a police negotiator, played by Sean Lau, to a 72-hour battle of wits and courage. Andy Lau won his first Hong Kong Film Award for Best Actor in 2000 for his performance in the film. The film was followed by a sequel, Running Out of Time 2, which was released in 2001.

== Plot ==
Inspector Ho Sheung-sang (Sean Lau) is a talented police negotiator who often goes unrecognized. He meets Cheung Wah (Andy Lau), a man with only weeks to live, who sets up an elaborate game to challenge Ho. Cheung first appears during a fake robbery at a finance company, using fake bullets and a mock bomb to pull Ho into a three-day contest. Cheung keeps outsmarting the police, escaping with clever disguises and careful planning. As the game progresses, Ho becomes increasingly determined to find out why Cheung chose him and what the game's real purpose is.

While Ho and Cheung play their game, Cheung also gets involved in a bigger conflict in the criminal underworld. He targets Baldy, a ruthless gangster who stole a valuable diamond and betrayed his old mentor, Peter Cheung, who turns out to be Cheung Wah’s late father. Cheung uses surveillance, sneaks into Baldy’s office, and pulls off a daring vault theft with a lookalike car and disguise to steal the diamond from Baldy. Meanwhile, Ho learns who Cheung really is and that he wants to avenge his father. Even though they are on opposite sides of the law, Ho and Cheung have to work together when Baldy’s men attack. Over time, they start to respect each other’s intelligence and determination.

At the story’s climax, Cheung sets up a diamond exchange at a bowling alley. This leads to Baldy’s arrest when it is revealed the diamonds were stolen from a nearby finance company. Cheung gets away with both the diamond and HK$20 million, but Ho eventually catches up to him. Cheung fakes another bomb, sets off a car explosion that is really just an engine-start device, and escapes, taking advantage of Ho’s sympathy for his illness. Afterward, Ho finds out that someone using his name donated HK$20 million to a children’s cancer foundation. He also sees the woman Cheung often met on buses wearing the diamond, now disguised as a cheap trinket. This suggests Cheung spent his last days seeking revenge, testing Ho, and quietly helping others before disappearing from Ho’s life.

== Cast ==
- Andy Lau as Cheung Wah
- Sean Lau as Inspector Ho Sheung-sang
- Yoyo Mung as Leung Yuen-ting (Girl on the Mini Bus)
- Waise Lee as Baldy
- Benz Hui as Chief Inspector Wong Kai-fat
- Lam Suet as Baldy's Henchman
- Ruby Wong as Head of the Interpol of Hong Kong region
- Ai Wai as Cop at bank
- Hung Wai-leung as Mr. Lee
- Lam Wai-kin as Mr. Hui - Negotiator
- Law Ching-ting as Baldy's thug
- Lee Sau-kei as Cheung's doctor
- So Yan-tin as Ho's subordinate
- Robert Sparks as an American Diamond Dealer
- Wong Wan-woo as Office building security guard
- Yau Man-shing as Bank Robber
- Yee Tin-hung as Bank robber

== Awards and nominations ==
Awards and nominations
Ceremony	Category	Recipient	Outcome
19th Hong Kong Film Awards	Best Film	Running Out of Time	Nominated
19th Hong Kong Film Awards	Best Director	Johnnie To	Nominated
19th Hong Kong Film Awards	Best Actor	Andy Lau	Won
19th Hong Kong Film Awards	Best Supporting Actor	Benz Hui	Nominated
19th Hong Kong Film Awards	Best Screenplay	Yau Nai-hoi, Laurent Coutiaud, Julien Carbon	Nominated
19th Hong Kong Film Awards	Best Film Editing	Andy Chan	Nominated
6th Hong Kong Film Critics Society Awards	Film of Merit	Running Out of Time	Won
5th Golden Bauhinia Awards	Best Film	Running Out of Time'	Nominated
5th Golden Bauhinia Awards	Best Director	Johnnie To	Nominated
5th Golden Bauhinia Awards	Best Actor	Andy Lau	Nominated
5th Golden Bauhinia Awards	Best Screenplay	Yau Nai-hoi, Laurent Coutiaud, Julien Carbon	Nominated
5th Golden Bauhinia Awards	Top 10 Chinese-language film	Running Out of Time	Won
