= Francis Ng =

Hong Kong actor and director

- 吳鎮宇
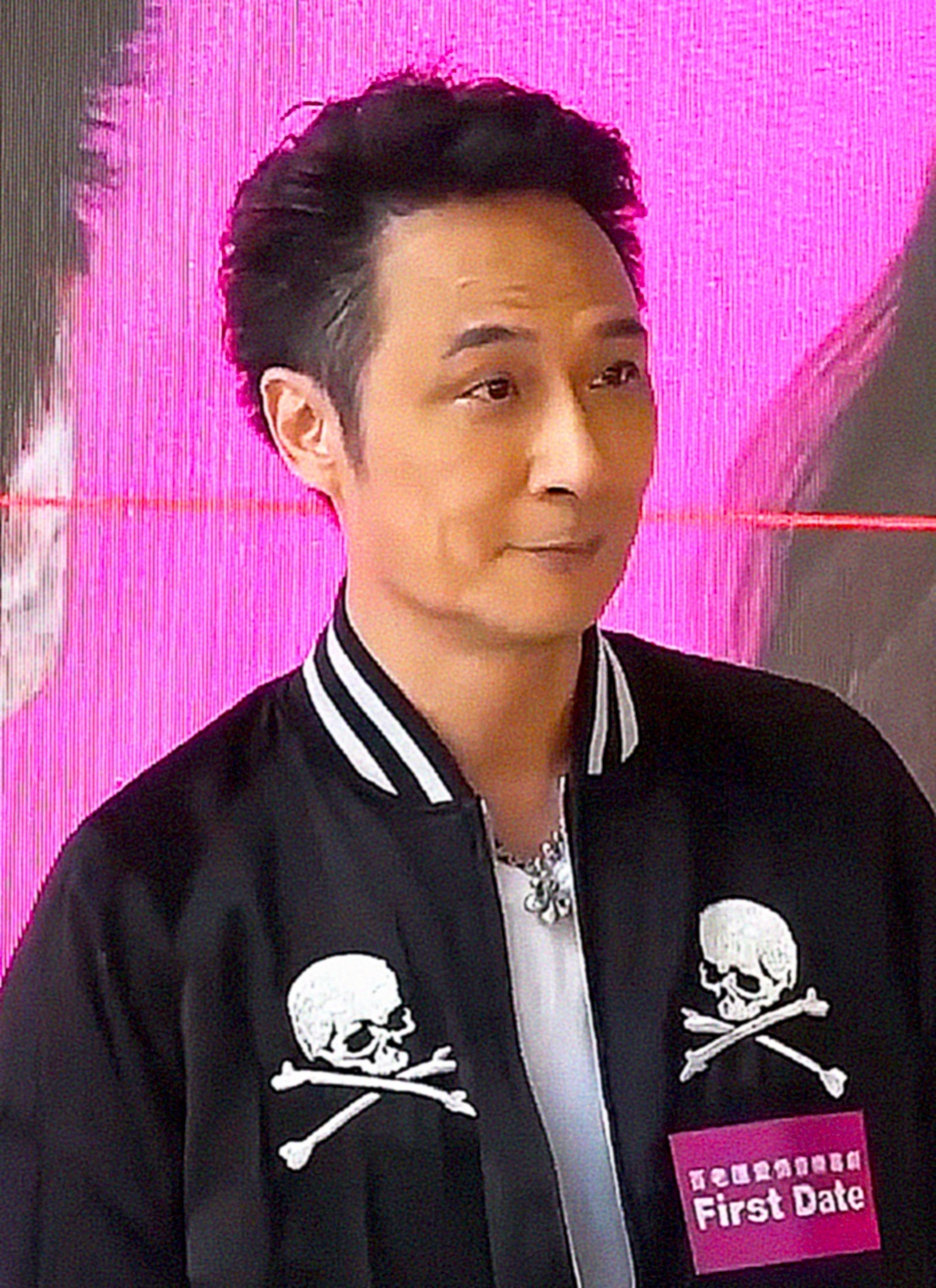
- Ng in May 2019
- Born: 吳志強; 21 December 1961 (age 64); British Hong Kong
- Other names: Francis Ng Chi-keung, Francis Ng Chun-Yu, Francis Wong, Ng Chun-Yung, Wu Zhen-Yu
- Years active: 1982–present
- Spouse: Fiona Wong Lai-ping (m. 2002)
- Children: 1
- Awards: Hong Kong Film Awards – Best Supporting Actor; 2000 2000 AD Golden Bauhinia Awards – Best Supporting Actor; 2000 2000 AD Hong Kong Film Critics Society Awards – Best Actor; 1996 Once Upon a Time in Triad Society; 1999 Bullets Over Summer; 2000 2000 AD Golden Horse Awards – Best Actor; 1999 The Mission TVB Anniversary Awards – My Favourite Television Character; 2003 Triumph in the Skies

Chinese name
- Traditional Chinese: 吳鎮宇
- Simplified Chinese: 吴镇宇
Transcriptions
Standard Mandarin
- Hanyu Pinyin: Wú Zhènyǔ
Yue: Cantonese
- Jyutping: Ng4 Zan3-jyu5

Francis Ng Chun-yu (Chinese: 吳鎮宇; born 21 December 1961) is a Hong Kong actor and director. He is known for his roles in the TVB series Old Time Buddy (1997) and Triumph in the Skies (2003), as well as in films such as Bullets Over Summer (1999), The Mission (1999), 2000 AD (2000), Juliet in Love (2000), and Infernal Affairs II (2003).

== Early life ==
Ng was born in Hong Kong to a family with ancestry from Panyu, Guangzhou, Guangdong, China. He is the uncle of footballer, Ng Wai Chiu.

Ng revealed in a stand-up comedy, saying that when he was a child he told his mother that his dream was to get a job that does not need any academic qualification, without a fixed working hours and high pay. Then, his mother asked him to become a beggar. So, he went to Wong Tai Sin, a famous temple in Hong Kong, to observe those beggars there. He realised that becoming beggar is too busy and need to perform manual labour, which does not suit his free and unconstrained attitude. Consequently, he gave up and decided to become a movie star because being a movie star fulfilled all the condition he requested.

During that time, the only way to become a movie star was to get into TVB Training Classes, so Ng signed up. After failing thrice entering the training classes, he eventually gave up. He went for a short period Pabbajja for seven days, shaved his head bald. After the event, he decided to try applying for the training classes again and this time he succeeded. He said in an interview that he succeeded because the interviewer thought that he Knew Shaolin Kung Fu due to his bald head.

== Television career ==
He graduated from TVB's training classes in 1982 along with Stephen Chow and Tony Leung. He acted in minor roles for the first few years in his television career. Until 1985, he started to involve in a great deal of TV Series, he was very outstanding in playing villainous roles in TV series such as The Price of Growing Up and The Final Combat. Later on, he played as a protagonist in situation comedies such as Everybody Loves Somebody and The Family Squad, which make him gradually disengage from being the stereotypical villain.

His contract with TVB ended in 1993 and he broke into the movie industry. In 1997, he returned to TVB to star a nostalgic comedy series Old Time Buddy with Gallen Lo, Maggie Cheung and Jessica Hsuen, which was one of the highest rating TV series that year. Later in 2003, he was invited back to TVB again to film Triumph in the Skies casting an airline pilot. He was the leading man role of the series, that series was cited as one of the best serial drama in TVB. He also involved in the sequel of the series Triumph in the Skies II which was aired on 15 July 2013.

== Film career ==
Ng entered the movie industry in 1986, and debuted in Midnight Girls. As a newcomer, he was only given minor roles. After becoming a freeman in 1993, he had the chance to be involved in bigger production film such as Flirting Scholar with Stephen Chow and Kung Fu Cult Master with Jet Li.

Ng's turning point in his filming career came in Young and Dangerous (1996), as villain Ugly Kwan, which was so popular that it spun an unofficial spin-off in Once Upon a Time in Triad Society (1996). His output has steadily increased since then. During 1999, he has won the Golden Horse Awards Best Actor for The Mission and the Hong Kong Film Critics Society Best Actor for Bullets Over Summer. In 2002, he also won the Hong Kong Film Awards and Golden Bauhinia Awards Best Supporting Actor for 2000 AD.

Although Hong Kong cinema encountered a downturn in the late 1990s, however Ng still put on at least 10 films per year. Ng also ventured into the arena of directing. He has directed a few movies including 9413 (1998), What is a Good Teacher (2002), Dancing Lion (2003) and Tracing Shadow (2009).

Along with Lau Ching-wan and Anthony Wong, he was named as one of the major three character actors working in the Hong Kong film industry at the 25th Hong Kong International Film Festival.

== Other performances ==
Other than television series and movies, Ng once was involved in stand-up comedy with Cheung Tat-ming and Dayo Wong in 1998 and 2000.

He provided the voice for Mr. Incredible/Bob Parr in the Cantonese version of Disney and Pixar's The Incredibles.

== Others ==
In the Greater China, the Mexican professional football goalkeeper Guillermo Ochoa is often regarded as a lookalike of Francis Ng, and therefore bears the nickname "Mexican Francis Ng" (Chinese: 墨西哥吳鎮宇).

== Filmography ==
=== Films ===
Year	Title	Role	Notes/Ref.
1986	Midnight Girls		
1989	Final Run		
1989	Proud and Confident		
1989	Lucky Guys		
1989	Devil Hunters		
1990	Dragon Fighter		
1990	Fire Phoenix		
1991	Fatal Game		
1991	In the Lap of God	Alex	
1992	Mighty Gambler		
1992	Handsome Siblings		Nominated – Hong Kong Film Award for Best Supporting Actor
1993	The Bride with White Hair	Chi Wu Shuang	
1993	Kung Fu Cult Master	Chang Tsui-San	
1993	Flirting Scholar	Member of The Four Scholars	
1993	Legal Innocence	Patrick Wong	
1993	Kidnap of Wong Chak Fai		
1993	Black Panther		
1994	I Wanna Be Your Man!		
1994	Naughty Couple		
1994	Easy Money		
1994	From Zero to Hero		
1994	Reckless Barrister		
1995	Fake Emperor		
1995	The Golden Girls		
1995	Those Were the Days...		
1996	Young and Dangerous	Ugly Kwan	
1996	Twinkle Twinkle Lucky Star (Yun cai zhi li xing)		
1996	Sexy and Dangerous		
1996	Satan Returns		
1996	Once Upon a Time in Triad Society	Ugly Kwan	
1996	Big Bullet	Inspector Yang	
1996	Once Upon a Time in Triad Society 2	Diy Chai/Dagger	
1996	God of Gamblers 3: The Early Stage	Ko Ngo	
1997	A Queer Story		
1997	All's Well, Ends Well 1997	Lo Fei	
1997	Too Many Ways to Be No. 1	Matt	
1997	24 Hours Ghost Story		
1997	97 Aces Go Places		
1997	Full Alert	Mak Kwan	
1997	Those were the Days	Patrick Tse Yuen	
1997	Theft Under the Sun		
1997	Behind the Yellow Line		
1998	Portland Street Blues		
1998	Raped by an Angel 2: The Uniform Fan		
1998	Till Death Do Us Part		
1998	The Group		
1998	Young and Dangerous: The Prequel		
1998	Magnificent Team		
1998	The Extra		
1998	9413		
1998	Wipe Out		
1999	The Mission		
1999	The H.K. Triad	Lok	
1999	Last Ghost Standing		
1999	A Wicked Ghost		
1999	Bullets Over Summer		Nominated – Hong Kong Film Award for Best Actor
1999	King of Debt Collecting Agent		
1999	Gen-X Cops		
1999	A Man Called Hero		
1999	Ripley's Believe It or Not!		
1999	Lord of Amusement		
1999	Never Compromise		
2000	2000 AD		Hong Kong Film Award for Best Supporting Actor
2000	Chinese Midnight Express II		
2000	Juliet in Love		Nominated – Hong Kong Film Award for Best Actor
2000	What is a Good Teacher		
2000	A War Named Desire		
2000	Clean My Name, Mr. Coroner!		
2001	Bakery Amour		
2001	Horror Hotline... Big Head Monster		
2001	A Gambler's Story		
2001	Loser's Club		
2001	Leaving in Sorrow		
2001	Good Boys 2		
2001	Fall for You		
2002	Beauty and the Breast		
2002	Women from Mars		
2003	Shiver		
2003	Heroic Duo		
2003	Colour of the Truth		
2003	Infernal Affairs II		Nominated – Hong Kong Film Award for Best Actor
2004	Fantasia	Kin	
2004	Love Trilogy		
2004	The White Dragon		
2005	Crazy N' The City		
2005	Himalaya Singh		
2005	Hands in the Hair		
2005	The Curse of Lola		
2005	Teacher in University		
2006	McDull, the Alumni		
2006	Karmic Mahjong		
2006	Exiled		
2006	On the Edge		
2006	Wo Hu		
2006	One Last Dance		
2007	Zhui Bu		
2007	It's a Wonderful Life		
2007	The Closet		
2007	Dancing Lion		
2007	Shamo		
2007	Bullet and Brain		
2008	Deadly Delicious		
2008	Buttonman		
2009	Tracing Shadow	Yehe Changkong	
2009	Turning Point	Zatoi	
2010	Wind Blast		
2010	Midnight Beating		
2011	The Warring States		
2011	Love Never Dies		
2011	Turning Point 2	Fok Tin-yam	
2012	Crazy Stupid Thief		
2012	My Way		
2012	Passion Island		
2012	Good-for-Nothing Heros		
2012	Game of Assassins		
2012	The Last Tycoon	Mau Choi	
2013	Pay Back		
2014	The House That Never Dies		
2015	Triumph in the Skies	Samuel Tong	
2015	Two Thumbs Up	Lucifer	
2015	Lovers and Movies		
2015	Love Without Distance		
2015	Sentence Me Guilty		
2016	House of Wolves	Charlie	
2016	Line Walker	Q sir/Inspector Q	
2016	The Warriors Gate	Wizard	
2016	Girl of the House		
2017	Shed Skin Papa	Tin Yat-hung	Nominated – Hong Kong Film Award for Best Actor
2017	77 Heartbreaks		
2017	Goldbuster		
2018	The Leaker		
2018	Man on the Dragon	Chan Lung	Nominated – Hong Kong Film Award for Best Actor
2019	Change of Gangster	Director	
2019	A Home with a View		
2019	Line Walker 2: Invisible Spy	CIB Superintendent Yip	
2021	All U Need Is Love		
2021	Once Upon a Time in Hong Kong	Lak Chui	
2021	Drifting	Fai	Nominated – Hong Kong Film Award for Best Actor
2022	Septet: The Story of Hong Kong	Headmaster	
2023	Death Notice		
2023	Death Stranding		
2024	Crisis Negotiators	Tse Ka Chun	
2024	Customs Frontline		
2024	A Place Called Silence	Dai Guodong	
2024	The Prosecutor	Yeung Tit-lap	
2025	Under Current	O Ting-pong	

=== Television series ===
Year	Title	Role	Notes
1982	Demi-Gods and Semi-Devils	A Buddhist monk	
1982	Hương thành lãng tử 香城浪子		
1983	The Old Miao Myth	Guest	
1983	The Legend of the Condor Heroes	Guest	
1984	The Duke of Mount Deer	Monk	
1985	Sword Stained with Royal Blood	Luo Liru	
1985	The Possessed		1987 Cheng Sing-Kung 鄭成功
1989	Deadly Secret	Man Kwai	
1989	Everybody Loves Somebody		
1989	Mo Min Kap Sin Fung		
1990	The Final Combat	Duen Yuk Lau	
1992	Land of the Condors 大地飛鷹	Xiao Fong	
1992	Family Squad 卡拉屋企		
1997	Old Time Buddy	Tse Yuen	
1998	General Fu 福将军	Zhou Fusheng	
2003	Triumph in the Skies	Samuel "Sam" Tong	
2005	The Great Adventure	Fan Sau-mong	
2005	Magic Chef	Cheng Fat	
2008	Healing Souls 生命有明天	Qin Huo	
2013	Triumph in the Skies II	Samuel "Sam" Tong	
2018	The Trading Floor	Anthony Yip	

=== Variety show ===
Year	English title	Chinese title	Role	Notes
2021	China in Classics	典籍里的中国	Sun Tzu	
