= Victim (1999 film) =

1999 Hong Kong film by Ringo Lam

- Hong Kong poster for Victim
- Directed by: Ringo Lam
- Screenplay by: Joe Ma; Ho Man-lung; Ringo Lam
- Produced by: Joe Ma
- Starring: Tony Leung Ka-fai; Lau Ching-wan; Amy Kwok; Wayne Lai; Collin Chou
- Cinematography: Ross W. Clarkson
- Edited by: Andy Chan
- Music by: Raymond Wong
- Production company: Brilliant Idea Group Ltd.
- Distributed by: Mei Ah Entertainment
- Release date: 16 October 1999
- Running time: 104 minutes
- Country: Hong Kong
- Language: Cantonese
- Box office: HK$3,915,929

Victim (Chinese: 目露凶光; pinyin: Mu lu xiong guang) is a 1999 Hong Kong thriller film directed and co-written by Ringo Lam. The film stars Tony Leung Ka-fai, Lau Ching-wan and Amy Kwok and is about a computer programmer named Ma who is found in a haunted hotel by a cop. The programmer begins to terrify his girlfriend Amy Fu, which leads the cops to think that Ma is covering up some larger crime.

On its release in Hong Kong theatres, the film's ending was changed for 50% of the film prints due to an argument between Ringo Lam and producer Joe Ma. It was nominated for several year-end awards in Asia and was included as a Film of Merit by the 6th Hong Kong Film Critics Society Awards.

== Plot ==
Ma (Lau Ching-wan) is kidnapped in a parking structure. His girlfriend Amy Fu (Amy Kwok) informs the police that though he had been jobless for a while and had a lot of debt, he was not a bad man. Police detective Pit (Tony Leung Ka-fai) later discovers Ma beaten, bloodied, and dangling upside down from the ceiling of an old abandoned hotel. The hotel in question is said to be haunted from murder-suicide of the original owner and his wife. On returning home, Ma starts terrifying Amy by behaving like the famous ghost of the hotel. The police begin to suspect that Ma's possession might be a ruse to hide something other crimes that are happening.

== Cast ==
- Lau Ching-wan as Manson Ma
- Tony Leung Ka-fai as Detective Pit Kwan
- Amy Kwok as Amy Fu
- Wayne Lai as Detective Bee Ting
- Collin Chou as Shing
- Hui Shiu-hung as Detective Yee
- Emily Kwan as Detective Po
- Joe Ma Tak-chung
- Joe Ma Wai-ho
- Joe Lee as Uncle Kwai
- David Lee as Detective David
- Chiu Yun-huen as Mr. Lai
- Chung King-fai as Chairman Lee
- Kong Foo-keung as Detective
- Suki Kwan as Grace Kwan
- Law Wai-kai
- Raymond Tsang as Security Guard Hon
- Wong Wa-wo as Security Guard Wong

== Release ==
Victim was released in Hong Kong on 16 October 1999. Two versions of Victim were released in Hong Kong due to arguments between director Ringo Lam and producer Joe Ma. 50% of the prints released contained an extra shot in the final scene that clarified the question of whether or not the character of Ma was possessed by a ghost. The other 50% reflected the original script, which left this plot element unanswered. The film grossed HK$3,915,929.

== Reception ==
Variety gave a mixed review, stating that the film was at its best with drew "some remarkable playing from its cast" while the ghost story elements were "the weakest". A negative review came from the San Francisco Chronicle, who referred to the film "as ridiculous as it is tepid. Only late in the second half of this almost-two-hour - way too long! - cat-and-mouse game does the film catch fire."

=== Awards and nominations ===
Awards
Ceremony	Category	Name	Outcome
1999 Golden Horse Film Festival and Awards
1999 Golden Horse Film Festival and Awards	Best Feature Film		Nominated
1999 Golden Horse Film Festival and Awards	Best Director	Ringo Lam	Nominated
1999 Golden Horse Film Festival and Awards	Best Leading Actor	Lau Ching-wan	Nominated
1999 Golden Horse Film Festival and Awards	Best Cinematography	Ross Clarkson	Nominated
1999 Golden Horse Film Festival and Awards	Best Film Editing	Andy Chan	Nominated
1999 Golden Horse Film Festival and Awards	Best Sound Effects	Martin Chappel	Nominated
19th Hong Kong Film Awards
19th Hong Kong Film Awards	Best Director	Ringo Lam	Nominated
19th Hong Kong Film Awards	Best Actor	Lau Ching-wan	Nominated
19th Hong Kong Film Awards	Best Cinematography	Ross Clarkson	Nominated
19th Hong Kong Film Awards	Best Sound Design	Cheuk Bo-yi	Nominated
6th Hong Kong Film Critics Society Awards
6th Hong Kong Film Critics Society Awards	Film of Merit		Won

== See also ==
- Hong Kong films of 1999
- List of thriller films of the 1990s
