= Behind the Shadows (film) =

2025 Hong Kong film by Jonathan Li and Choy Man-yu

- Official film poster
- Traditional Chinese: 私家偵探
- Simplified Chinese: 私家侦探
- Literal meaning: Private investigator
- Hanyu Pinyin: Sī Jiā Zhēn Tàn
- Jyutping: Si1 Gaa1 Zing1 Taam3
- Directed by: Jonathan Li; Chou Man-yu
- Screenplay by: Chou Man-yu
- Produced by: Soi Cheang
- Starring: Louis Koo; Liu Kuan-ting; Chrissie Chau
- Cinematography: Tam Wan-kai
- Edited by: Tsang Yu-kin; Yan Tingting
- Music by: Hanz Au; Iris Liu
- Production companies: One Cool Film Production; Wishart Media; Filmforce Studios; One Cool Film SDN BHD
- Distributed by: One Cool Picture (Hong Kong, Worldwide); Intercontinental Film Distributors (HK) (Hong Kong)
- Release date: 12 June 2025
- Running time: 102 minutes
- Country: Hong Kong
- Language: Cantonese

Behind the Shadows is a 2025 Hong Kong action thriller film directed by Jonathan Li and Choy Man-yu and starring Louis Koo, Chrissie Chau and Liu Kuan-ting. Koo plays a private detective who is investigating a rape and murder case involving adultery.

Production for the film began in Kuala Lumpur, Malaysia in September 2023. The film was theatrically released on 12 June 2025 in Hong Kong.

== Plot ==
Au Yeung Wai Yip is a private detective from Hong Kong in Malaysia, who is best known for being able to locate cheating partners or missing people. He is tasked to find 3 women from 3 different clients suspecting their partners of infidelity, a man named Kek who's seeing Au Yeung's wife Kuang Weng Sam suspecting her of not telling him she has a husband, a man named Sheo whose fiance Ong Kah Min has run off after an argument between them resulting in the former not being able to reach the latter, and a case from his gangster friend Clawy to investigate the infidelity of a gang leader Maraca's girl, Betty.

Meanwhile, Detective Chen Meng is investigating the death of a woman, Li Yoke Na, who was killed in an abandoned house. The case makes him fall ill and results in him landing in a hospital, where his wife is revealed to be hospitalized at. When he returns to work, he and his team learn that there's a witness who has CCTV footage of the night Li was murdered at the scene, which is revealed to be Ong Kah Min. One night, Au Yeung finds Ong Kah Min's address in Nantang and sees her talking to a mysterious man who is wearing all black clothing. He then leaves when he learns that Weng Sam and Kek are seeing each other at a hotel room. Au Yeung takes Weng Sam to leave and they argue on the way back while driving, where Weng Sam makes her husband pull over to the side of the road. Weng Sam accuses Au Yeung of being distant and not caring for heras the former wanted the family while the latter argues back about how he doesn't make enough money from his detective work in Malaysia compared to Hong Kong and the fact the former's mother would forbid him from marrying her had he not moved to Malaysia. Weng Sam demands that she wants a divorce, angering Au Yeung to the point he reminds his wife, that it was her decision to ask for a divorce and not him as he walks away on the road leaving Weng Sam alone trying to call him back.

The next day, Au Yeung learns that Kah Min has died when Sheo comes by and informs him about her death. Feeling guilty about being unable to prevent her death as he had aborted watching her to go back to his wife, he goes to the police station to report what he saw to Chen , who questions him. However, Au Yeung grows uneasy while being questioned as he noticed the murderer was wiping sweat on the back of his neck and that the detective is doing the same. He quickly leaves the station and hides out with Scrappy before he assembles a crew consisting of two of his employees and Feeble, another investigator who works alongside Au Yeung. Au Yeung wants them to follow Chen, as he suspects Chen is the murderer. However, Feeble aborts when Heong Meng detects the former following him and has left him a razor on the back of his jacket. Not wanting his life to be at risk, Feeble refuses to help Au Yeung tail the detective.

Complications arise for Au Yeung when he learns Weng Sam is leaving for Singapore for a business trip and has prepared divorced papers, which the former refuses to sign. They argue until Chen comes to their place, citing a noise complaint has lead him to investigate and asks for their IDs. Chen warns Au Yeung to stop following him as Weng Sam doesn't look before he leaves. Au Yeung then tells his wife to leave for Singapore immediately. As they arrive in Singapore, they rekindle their relationship as Weng Sam reveals that she had Kek approach Au Yeung to make it seem as if she was cheating with him, to get Au Yeung's attention and for him to realize the rift between them confirming she never had an affair with Kek. Later that night, Chen calls Au Yeung asking him what did he think of the women he investiged, and reveals that he indeed murdered both Kah Min and Li Yoke. His motive stemmed from when he saw his wife having an affair with his best friend. When he tried to follow them, both his best friend and wife had lost control of their car in the rain when he tried to get a closer look. His best friend died while his wife was in a coma. This fueled his anger to target women who were involved in cases of infidelity.

Later, Betty and Clawy argue outside of a nightclub, where Clawy had followed her to as he accuses her of infidelity and lying as her birthday was on a different month as she had gone out to see the rival gang leader. Clawy and Betty are revealed to have slept with each other. Chen, having tracked them down ambushes the pair and kidnaps the latter. Clawy calls Au Yeung, pleading with him to save Betty. Chen takes Betty to the house he had bought for his wife and plans to suffocate both of them to death with gas, as he recaps about how he had taken out loans just to get the house. Au Yeung finds the pair, attempting to rescue Betty and fights with Chen. They both fight in the pool until Chen hallucinates seeing Betty as his dead wife who had died in the hospital, succumbs to his injuries as he helps Au Yeung up to the surface while he drowns to his death. He asks Au Yeung to take Betty away as Chen drowns.

Three months later, Au Yeung visits Clawy after his stay in the hospital. Clawy is revealed to be with Betty and they talk about the cop having ambushed them. It is also revealed that Kah Min was murdered not because of her suspected infidelity, but because she had the CCTV footage which would have caught Chen on camera committing the murder, so he murdered her to silence her. It is then that Kah Min's fiance receives a wedding package for what would have been for their wedding. Au Yeung's relationship with Kuan improves as well, with the movie ending with Kuan. Au Yeung calls Kuan from his office saying he's booked a table for hot pot for their dinner tonight although Kuan has to work overtime tonight and suggests he starts without her, but he says he'll wait for her as he looks out the window at her workplace.

== Cast ==
- Louis Koo as Au Yeung Wai Yip
- Chrissie Chau as Kuan Weng Sam
- Liu Kuan-ting as Chen Meng
- Raymond Wong Ho-yin as Clawy
- Eddie Cheung as Feeble
- Renci Yeung as Betty
- Yumi Wong
- Auguste Kwan
- Phei Yong

== Production ==
In April 2023, Louis Koo's production company, One Cool Group Limited, established a new branch in Malaysia and Behind the Shadows is the first film production to be shot in the country. The film held its production launch press conference on 16 September 2023 at the EQ Hotel, Jalan Sultan Ismail in the Kuala Lumpur Inner Ring Road attended by directors Jonathan Li and Chou Man-yu and cast members Koo, Liu Kuan-ting, Chrissie Chau, Raymond Wong, Renci Yeung, Eddie, Yumi Wong, Auguste Kwan and Phei Yong. Cheang Pou-soi will serve as the film's producer. Koo reveals he plays a private detective in the film who investigates an adultery rape and murder case while Chau reveals she plays the estranged wife of Koo's character. Raymond Wong reveals that he portrays a gang member while Yeung stated that she plays one of the partners of Wong's character. Director Li reveals that principal photography for the film began a week prior in the Klang Valley area and is scheduled to wrap by the end of the following month On 22 September, the film held its production commencement blessing ceremony in Kuala Lumpur.

== Release ==
The film is selected at the 24th New York Asian Film Festival held from July 11 to July 27, 2025 for its North American Premiere.
