= The Kid (1999 film) =

1999 Hong Kong film by Jacob Cheung

- Film poster
- Traditional Chinese: 流星語
- Hanyu Pinyin: Liúxīng Yǔ
- Jyutping: Lau4sing1 Jyu5
- Directed by: Jacob Cheung
- Written by: Sze Yeung-Ping; Mathew Tang
- Produced by: Jacob Cheung
- Starring: Leslie Cheung; Carrie Ng; Ti Lung; Qi Qi
- Cinematography: Jimmy Wong
- Edited by: Kwong Chi-Leung
- Music by: Alex San; David Sum
- Production company: Midas Film Company
- Distributed by: BIG Mandarin Films Distribution; Creative Alliance
- Release date: 14 October 1999 (Hong Kong)
- Running time: 110 minutes
- Country: Hong Kong
- Language: Cantonese

The Kid (Chinese: 流星語; pinyin: Liúxīng Yǔ) is a 1999 Hong Kong film directed by Jacob Cheung and starring Leslie Cheung. It also co-stars Yip Tuen Nam, Ti Lung, and Carrie Ng.

== Synopsis ==
This drama highlights the social problems of single parents struggling to raise children. Leslie Cheung plays the role of a retired fund-manager, Wing who lost his entire fortune in a financial mishap and was severely depressed until he discovered an abandoned baby boy in his yacht which he has not sold off at that time. He sought to raise the baby as his own son, encountering many happy moments even though he was not financially sound. His happiness is cruelly cut short a few years later as the now toddler's real mother returns and wishes to raise her own son again, while he attempts to prevent this as he loved his adopted son very much. The final touching scene depicts the inevitable as his beloved adopted son followed his mother into her luxury car while Wing fought back tears despite him voluntarily relenting into allowing the child to leave.

== Cast and roles ==
- Leslie Cheung – Wing
- Carrie Ng
- Ti Lung – Sir Lung
- Qi Qi – Maise
- Amanda Lee
- Echo Shen
