= Lam Suet =

Hong Kong actor

- 林雪
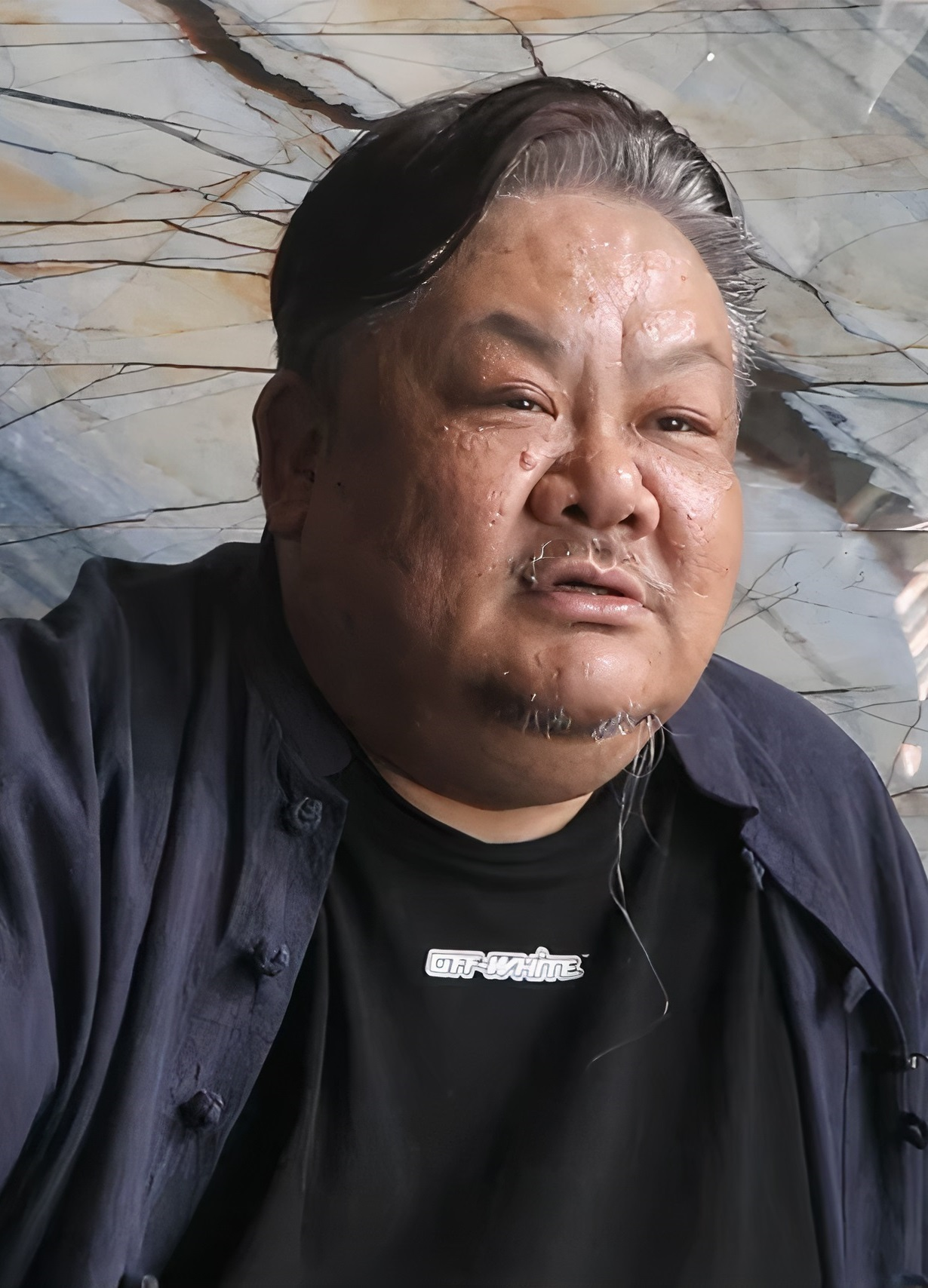
- Lam in 2021
- Born: Lin Jie; 8 July 1964 (age 62); Tianjin, China
- Awards: Golden Bauhinia Awards – Best Supporting Actor; 2003 PTU

Chinese name
- Traditional Chinese: 林雪
- Simplified Chinese: 林雪
Transcriptions
Standard Mandarin
- Hanyu Pinyin: Lín Xuĕ
Yue: Cantonese
- Jyutping: Lam^{4} Syut^{3}

Birth name
- Traditional Chinese: 林捷
- Simplified Chinese: 林捷
Transcriptions
Standard Mandarin
- Hanyu Pinyin: Lín Jié
Yue: Cantonese
- Jyutping: Lam^{4} Zit^{6}

Lam Suet or Lin Xue (born Lin Jie; 8 July 1964), is a Hong Kong film actor.

== Life and career ==
Lam was born in Tianjin, and came to Hong Kong as a youth in 1979 to receive inheritance money left by his grandfather. Soon after, all the money had been squandered and Lam had to work various odd jobs to make a living.

In the mid-eighties he got employment on movie sets through the help of friends. He has done different roles, from lighting and props to stage manager and set and script supervisor.

Lam gradually developed an interest in acting and by his own account, pestered various directors until they relented and gave him tiny roles. There are two pivotal persons in Lam's acting career. The first is Stephen Chow, who befriended him in his early days as a crew member and cast him in movies like The God of Cookery (1996) and Kung Fu Hustle.

The second person is director Johnnie To. Lam has been in over 80 films since 1996 and at least 20 of those have been directed or produced by To.

Known for his weight and size, his roles are often as a bumbling secondary character providing comic relief from the most intense nature of To's films. He is perhaps most famous for his various supporting roles in To's films, notably as the bumbling taxi driver Yip in the award-winning film Breaking News (2004).

The most notable To-Lam collaborations include The Mission, which garnered Lam Best Supporting Actor nominations at the Hong Kong Film Awards and the Golden Horse Award, and PTU. Lam was nominated for a Golden Horse Award for Best Supporting Actor and took home the Golden Bauhinia Award for Best Supporting Actor for his role in PTU. He has also had interesting roles in movies like Wu yen (2001), as the effeminate Prime Minister, and in Diva - Ah Hey (2003), in which he played Charlene Choi's loving and supportive father. Lam has been married since 1997. His wife is 10 years his junior and is from the same hometown, and they have a son and daughter. In 2017, Suet won the Best Supporting Actor Award for film Trivisa on the 11th Asian Film Awards in Hong Kong.

== Filmography ==
- Story of Ricky (1992)
- The God of Cookery (1996)
- Lifeline (1997) (extra)
- The Odd One Dies (1997)
- Killing Me Tenderly (1997)
- Intruder (1997)
- The Longest Nite (1998)
- Expect the Unexpected (1998)
- A Hero Never Dies (1998)
- Where a Good Man Goes (1999)
- Running Out of Time (1999)
- The Mission (1999)
- Juliet in Love (2000)
- Twilight Garden (2000)
- Fist Power (2000)
- Roaring Wheels (2000)
- Play with Strangers (2000)
- Resort Massacre (2000)
- The Blood Rules (2000)
- My Name is Nobody (2000)
- Needing You ... (2000)
- Help!!! (2000)
- Cop on a Mission (2001)
- Wu yen (2001)
- Dead End (2001)
- Doctor No... (2001)
- Electrical Girl (2001)
- Everyday is Valentine (2001)
- Maniacal Night (2001)
- Gold Fingers (2001)
- Hero of City (2001)
- Goodbye Mr. Cool (2001)
- Master Q 2001 (2001)
- Love on a Diet (2001)
- Fulltime Killer (2001)
- Prison on Fire - Plaintive Destiny (2001)
- You Shoot, I Shoot (2001)
- Nightmares in Precinct 7 (2001)
- Every Dog Has His Date (2001)
- Running Out of Time 2 (2001)
- U-Man (2002)
- Color of Pain (2002)
- The Stewardess (2002)
- Devil Face Angel Heart (2002)
- My Left Eye Sees Ghosts (2002)
- If U Care... (2002)
- Just One Look (2002)[cameo]
- Possessed (2002)
- Tsui Hark's Vampire Hunters (2002)
- Shark Busters (2002)
- Love for All Seasons (2003)
- Diva - Ah Hey (2003)
- Ghost Office (2003)
- Looking for Mr. Perfect (2003)
- PTU (2003)
- The Trouble-Makers (2003)[V]
- Kung Fu Master is my Grandma! (2003)
- Love Undercover 2: Love Mission (2003)
- Good Times, Bed Times (2003)
- Men Suddenly in Black (2003)
- Perfect Education 3 (JAPAN 2003)
- To My Dearest Father (2003)
- Turn Left, Turn Right (2003)
- A Wedding or a Funeral (2004)
- Elixir of Love (2004)
- Snow Falling from the Sky of June (2004)
- Papa Loves You (2004)
- The Miracle Box (2004)
- Jiang Hu (2004)
- Moving Targets (2004)
- One Nite in Mongkok (2004)
- Breaking News (2004)
- Money Kills (2004)
- Infernal Mission (2004)
- The Key to Destiny (2004)
- My Romeo (2004)
- Bust Family (2004)
- Twinkle Stars (2005)
- My Baby Shot Me Down (2004)
- Explosive City (2004)
- Cop Unbowed (2004)
- Kung Fu Hustle (2004)
- Twinkle Stars (2005)
- Crazy N' the City (2005)
- Colour of the Loyalty (2005)
- Divergence (2005)
- 2 Young (2005)
- The Unusual Youth (2005)
- Election (2005)
- All About Love (2005)
- Home Sweet Home (2005)
- My Kung-Fu Sweetheart (2006)
- 2 Become 1 (2006)
- I'll Call You (2006)
- Election 2 (a.k.a. Triad Election) (2006)
- Love @ First Note (2006)
- Dog Bite Dog (2006)
- Undying Heart (2006)
- Fatal Contact (2006)
- Exiled (2006)
- Happy Birthday (2006)
- House of the Invisibles (2007)
- Forest of Death (2007)
- Eye in the Sky (2007)
- Dancing Lion (2007)
- Gong Tau: An Oriental Black Magic (2007)
- Simply Actors (2007)
- Invisible Target (2007)
- Beauty and the 7 Beasts (2007)
- Brothers (2007)
- Triangle (2007)
- Mad Detective (2007)
- Linger (2008)
- Fatal Move (2008)
- Run Papa Run (2008)
- Sparrow (2008)
- Tactical Unit - The Code (2008)
- Sasori (2008)
- Legendary Assassin (2008)
- Shinjuku Incident (2009)
- Vengeance (2009)
- Tactical Unit - Comrades in Arms (2009)
- The Storm Warriors (2009)
- ICAC Investigators 2009 (2009) (TV Series)
- Poker King (2009)
- Womb Ghosts (2010)
- The Legend is Born – Ip Man (2010)
- Triple Tap (2010)
- The Men of Justice (2010) (TV series)
- 72 Tenants of Prosperity (2010)
- The Jade and the Pearl (2010)
- I Love Hong Kong (2011)
- Don't Go Breaking My Heart (2011)
- The Detective 2 (2011)
- Beach Spike (2011)
- The Loan Shark (2011)
- The Woman Knight of Mirror Lake (2011)
- A Land without Boundaries (2011)
- Mayday 3DNA (2011)
- The Sorcerer and the White Snake (2011)
- Turning Point 2 (2011)
- The Great Magician (2012)
- Croczilla (2012)
- The Fairy Tale Killer (2012)
- Vulgaria (2012)
- Ultra Reinforcement (2012)
- All's Well, Ends Well 2012 (2012)
- Crazy Stupid Thief (2012)
- Everything Is Nothing (2012)
- Insistence (2012)
- Good-for-Nothing Heros (2012)
- Drug War (2013)
- Better and Better (2013)
- Blind Detective (2013)
- The Constable (2013)
- SDU: Sex Duties Unit (2013)
- Tales from the Dark 1 (2013)
- The Love Experience (2013)
- The True Love (2014)
- The Apostles (2014)
- The Midnight After (2014)
- Iceman (2014)
- The Extreme Fox (2014)
- But Always (2014)
- Ex Fighting (2014)
- Town of the Dragon (2014)
- Break (2014)
- Don't Go Breaking My Heart 2 (2014)
- Imprisoned: Survival Guide for Rich and Prodigal (2015)
- Monk Comes Down the Mountain (2015)
- Lost in Hong Kong (2015)
- Saving Mr. Wu (2015)
- Heart for Heaven (2015)
- Trivisa (2016)
- Kill Time (2016)
- Three (2016)
- Robbery (2016)
- Goddess Era (2016)
- MBA Partners (2016)
- The Glory of Tang Dynasty (2017)
- Love Contractually (2017)
- Colour of the Game (2017)
- Always Be With You (2017)
- Iceman 2 (2018)
- A Home with a View (2019)
- A Lifetime Treasure (2019)
- Missbehavior (2019)
- My Dear Elephant (2019)
- The Invincible Dragon (2019)
- Undercover Punch and Gun (2019)
- Time (2021)
- Dynasty Warriors (2021)
- Septet: The Story of Hong Kong (2022)
- Banknotes Fly (TBA)
- Love the Way You Lie (TBA)
