= John Chong =

Hong Kong film producer and presenter (born 1959)

- Born: 1959 (age 66–67)
- Occupations: film producer, and presenter

Chinese name
- Traditional Chinese: 莊澄
- Simplified Chinese: 庄澄
Transcriptions
Standard Mandarin
- Hanyu Pinyin: Zhuāng Chéng
Yue: Cantonese
- Jyutping: Jong1 Ching4

John Chong Ching is a Hong Kong film producer and presenter. He is one of the most successful producers of Hong Kong cinema beginning with the Golden Age of Bruce Lee and Jackie Chan in the 1970s and 1980s. He is now a veteran film producer of Media Asia Group, the company behind the Infernal Affairs trilogy.

== Career ==
Chong has spent his entire career in the local entertainment scene. He started working for Television Broadcasts Ltd. (TVB), Hong Kong's premier television channel, and also wrote lyrics for Cantopop songs. In 1994, he was working at a satellite network Star TV Ltd. when he and six partners decided the time was ripe for an entrepreneurial approach to filmmaking. Dubbing themselves the Seven Samurai, they aimed to reverse a sharp decline in the Hong Kong film business as moviegoers rejected the poor quality of locally produced films.

They began taking lessons from Hollywood, insisting, for instance, that all their stars sign the detailed contracts necessary to distribute Media Asia's films overseas. Chong tightened controls on costs, and Media Asia earned $5.1 million on sales of $39 million, which is considered to be minuscule numbers by Hollywood standards, but in Hong Kong, a solid success.

Chong continues to work as a producer for Media Asia, with his goal to expand in the Mainland Chinese market, and to later take the company public.

Chong stepped down as CEO of Media Asia at the end of April 2012. He was recruited by Raymond Wong Pak-ming to join Wong's company, Pegasus Motion Pictures, in October of that year. Chong left Pegasus in 2015 to serve as an independent consultant, then returned to Media Asia as a special advisor to chairman Peter Lam.
