= Ordinary Heroes (1999 film) =

1999 Hong Kong film by Ann Hui

- Film poster

Chinese name
- Traditional Chinese: 千言萬語
- Simplified Chinese: 千言万语
- Literal meaning: thousands of words
Transcriptions
Yue: Cantonese
- Jyutping: Cin1 Jin4 Maan6 Jyu5
- Directed by: Ann Hui
- Written by: Chan King-chung
- Produced by: Ann Hui
- Starring: Loletta Lee; Lee Kang-sheng; Anthony Wong; Tse Kwan-ho
- Cinematography: Yu Lik-wai
- Edited by: Kwong Chi-leung
- Music by: Chiu Tsang-hei; Hui Yuen
- Production company: Class Limited Productions
- Release date: 10 April 1999
- Running time: 128 minutes
- Country: Hong Kong
- Language: Cantonese

Ordinary Heroes is a 1999 Hong Kong drama film directed and produced by Ann Hui. Based on real-life prototypes, the film focused on social activists in the 1970s and 1980s who fought defiantly against the British Colonial government for the rights of the Yau Ma Tei boat people and their mainland wives. Mostly leftists and Communist sympathisers, their despair after the 1989 Tiananmen Square massacre is also highlighted.

The Chinese title refers to a popular Teresa Teng song which played during the film. Ordinary Heroes was critically acclaimed, winning Best Picture at the 19th Hong Kong Film Awards and the 36th Golden Horse Awards in Taiwan, among others.

== Cast ==
- Loletta Lee as Sow Fung-tai (credited as Rachel Lee)
  - Lee Kim-yu as teenaged Sow Fung-tai
- Lee Kang-sheng as Lee Siu-tung
  - Cheung Nga-kwan as teenaged Lee Siu-tung
- Anthony Wong as Father Kam
- Tse Kwan-ho as Yau Ming-foon
- Paw Hee-ching as Lee's mother
- Lawrence Ah Mon as police officer
- Mok Chiu-yu as street performer
- Ann Hui as director (cameo)

== Awards ==
It won the prestigious Best Picture award at the 19th Hong Kong Film Awards, as well as five awards at the Golden Horse Film Festival, including Best Film. It was chosen as Hong Kong's official Best Foreign Language Film submission at the 72nd Academy Awards, but did not manage to receive a nomination. It was also entered into the 49th Berlin International Film Festival.

== See also ==
- List of submissions to the 72nd Academy Awards for Best Foreign Language Film
- List of Hong Kong submissions for the Academy Award for Best Foreign Language Film
