= Dayung Sampan =

Indonesian folk song

A traditional fishermen sampan off the coast of Jakarta, the homeland of the Betawi people.

"Dayung Sampan" is an Indonesian folk song originating from Banten, commonly associated with Betawi and Peranakan Benteng culture. It's popular in Indonesia and Singapore.

== Background and description ==
"Dayung Sampan" originated in Indonesia, believed to be composed by the pasindhèn Dasimah. the song became popular and strongly associated with the Chinese and Betawi people in Banten and Jakarta. Traditionally, it's played using gambang kromong, a traditional Betawi orchestra.

The lyrics of "Dayung Sampan" tells about the life of fishermen and their journey into the sea to catch fish.

== Popularity outside Indonesia ==
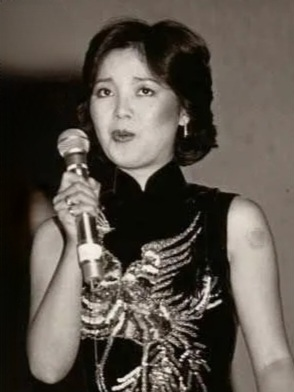
The popularity of Dayung Sampan outside of Indonesia is further amplified by Teresa Teng's Mandarin cover, "Tian Mi Mi".

Dayung Sampan was first brought to Singapore by migrants from Indonesia. In 1956, a Mandarin cover titled "Poor Great Uncle" (可怜阿伯大) was sung by Wu Meiling and Chen Chuan.

In 1978, Taiwanese singer Teresa Teng made an Indonesian cover of the song, the version of "Dayung Sampan" performed by Teng was created by Singaporean composer Osman Ahmad, believed to originate from the 1950s. On 20 September, 1979, Teng released the album An Unforgettable Day (難忘的一天), which featured a Mandarin cover of Dayung Sampan titled "Tian Mi Mi" (甜蜜蜜), with lyrics penned by Zhuang Nu.

== Renditions ==
The oldest known recording of Dayung Sampan is sung by Miss Riboet from 1927, titled "Dajoeng Sampang", while the version with the most popular and well-known lyrics in Indonesia was first sung by Aida Mustafa in her 1969 album Dayung Sampan, which was later included in her folk album Sarinande.

=== Other renditions ===
- Rita Zahara released a cover in her 1956 album Presents Songs From Old Djakarta In Krontjong Beat, arranged and directed by Rudi Pirngadi,
- Titiek Sandhora released a cover in 1970, with lyrics similar to the one used by Teng.
- Benyamin Sueb adapted the song's melody for the song "Minta Kawin" for his 1977 album "Telpon Umum", instead about asking to marry a Chinese-Indonesian.
- Waldjinah released a Javanese cover of the song for her album Glenak-Glenik.
- A kroncong version was released by Hetty Koes Endang in an album of the same name.
- Included in her 2006 album Lenggok 20 Tahun featuring He Yun, Noraniza Idris covers the song with Malay lyrics.
- Ananda Sukarlan composed his Rapsodia Nusantara no. 36 based on Dayung Sampan and Teng's Tian Mi Mi.
