= 16th Hong Kong Film Awards =

1997 Hong Kong Film Awards

- Date: 13 April 1997
- Site: Hong Kong Cultural Centre
- Hosted by: Lydia Shum and Nancy Sit

The 16th Hong Kong Film Awards ceremony was held on 13 April 1997 in the Hong Kong Cultural Centre and hosted by Lydia Shum and Nancy Sit. In total, sixteen winners in fifteen categories were unveiled. Peter Chan's Comrades: Almost a Love Story became the biggest winner for the year with nine awards, setting the record for the highest number of categories won by a single film. The event also marked the last time the Hong Kong Film Awards was held while under British colonial rule.

The nominees were announced on 24 February 1997. The front runners were Peter Chan's Comrades: Almost a Love Story and Benny Chan's Big Bullet, with eleven and nine nominations respectively.

== Awards ==
Winners are listed first, highlighted in boldface, and indicated with a double dagger (‡).

| **Best Film**: **Comrades: Almost a Love Story**‡; Hu-Du-Men; Big Bullet; Police Story 4: First Strike; Viva Erotica | **Best Director**: **Peter Chan — Comrades: Almost a Love Story**‡; Benny Chan — Big Bullet; Derek Yee and Law Chi-leung — Viva Erotica; Derek Chiu — The Log; Shu Kei — Hu-Du-Men |
| **Best Screenplay**: **Ivy Ho — Comrades: Almost a Love Story**‡; Raymond To — Hu-Du-Men; Rico Chung — Once Upon A Time in Triad Society; Rico Chung — Once Upon A Time in Triad Society 2; Lee Chi-Ngai — Lost and Found; Cheung Chi-Sing — Love and Sex Among the Ruins | **Best Actor**: **Kent Cheng — The Log**‡; Sean Lau — Big Bullet; Leon Lai — Comrades: Almost a Love Story; Michael Wong — First Option; Jackie Chan — Police Story 4: First Strike; Leslie Cheung — Viva Erotica |
| **Best Actress**: **Maggie Cheung — Comrades: Almost a Love Story**‡; Josephine Siao — Hu-Du-Men; Karen Mok — God of Cookery; Gong Li — Temptress Moon; Sandra Ng — 4 Faces of Eve | **Best Supporting Actor**: **Eric Tsang — Comrades: Almost a Love Story**‡; Jordan Chan — Big Bullet; Jerry Lamb — The Log; Elvis Tsui — Viva Erotica; Anthony Wong — Young and Dangerous 3; Simon Yam — To Be No. 1 |
| **Best Supporting Actress**: **Shu Qi — Viva Erotica**‡; Law Lan — 13 July; Theresa Lee — Big Bullet; Theresa Lee — Who's the Woman, Who's the Man; Anita Yuen — Hu-Du-Men; May Law — Bodyguards of Last Governor | **Best New Performer**: **Shu Qi — Viva Erotica**‡; Annie Wu — Police Story 4: First Strike; Theresa Lee — Who's the Woman, Who's the Man; Kristy Yeung — Comrades: Almost a Love Story; Daniel Chan — Hu-Du-Men |
| **Best Film Editing**: **Peter Cheung and Cheung Ka-fai — Big Bullet**‡; Peter Cheung and Yau Chi-Wai — Police Story 4: First Strike; Chan Kei-Hop — First Option; David Wu — Somebody Up There Likes Me; Eric Kwong and Shu Kei — Hu-Du-Men | **Best Cinematography**: **Jingle Ma — Comrades: Almost a Love Story**‡; Arthur Wong — Somebody Up There Likes Me; Arthur Wong — Big Bullet; Christopher Doyle — Temptress Moon; Poon Hang-Sang — Shanghai Grand |
| **Best Art Direction**: **Kenneth Yee — Comrades: Almost a Love Story**‡; Kenneth Yee — Who's the Woman, Who's the Man; Eddie Ma and Bill Lui — Black Mask; Wong Hap-Kwai — Temptress Moon; Bruce Yu — Shanghai Grand | **Best Costume Make Up Design**: **Dora Ng — Comrades: Almost a Love Story**‡; Dora Ng — Who's the Woman, Who's the Man; Tomas Chan — 4 Faces of Eve; Bruce Yu — Shanghai Grand; William Fung and Kwan Mei-Bo — Black Mask |
| **Best Action Choreography**: **Stanley Tong — Police Story 4: First Strike**‡; Yuen Wo Ping — Black Mask; Tung Wai — Shanghai Grand; Tony Ching and Ma Yuk Sing — Dr. Wai and the Scripture Without Words; Ma Yuk Sing — Big Bullet; Bruce Law — First Option | **Best Original Film Score**: **Chiu Jun-Fun — Comrades: Almost a Love Story**‡; Clarence Hui and Chiu Jun-Fun and Lau Cho-Tak — Viva Erotica; Lau Yee Tat — The Log; Peter Kam — Big Bullet; Chiu Jun-Fun and Peter Kam — The Age of Miracles |
**Best Original Film Song**: **風花雪 — Lost and Found**‡; Composer: Mark Lui; Lyricist: Chow Lai Mau; Singer: Kelly Chen; 色情男女 — Viva Erotica; Composer: Jason Choi; Lyricist: Albert Leung; Singer: Karen Mok and Jordan Chan; 有心人 — Who's the Woman, Who's the Man; Composer: Leslie Cheung; Lyricist: Albert Leung; Singer: Leslie Cheung and Anita Mui; 默契 — Feel 100%... Once More; Composer: Chan Kwok Wah; Lyricist: Erica Lee; Singer: Sammi Cheng
