= Ondel-ondel =

Indonesian traditional puppet figure

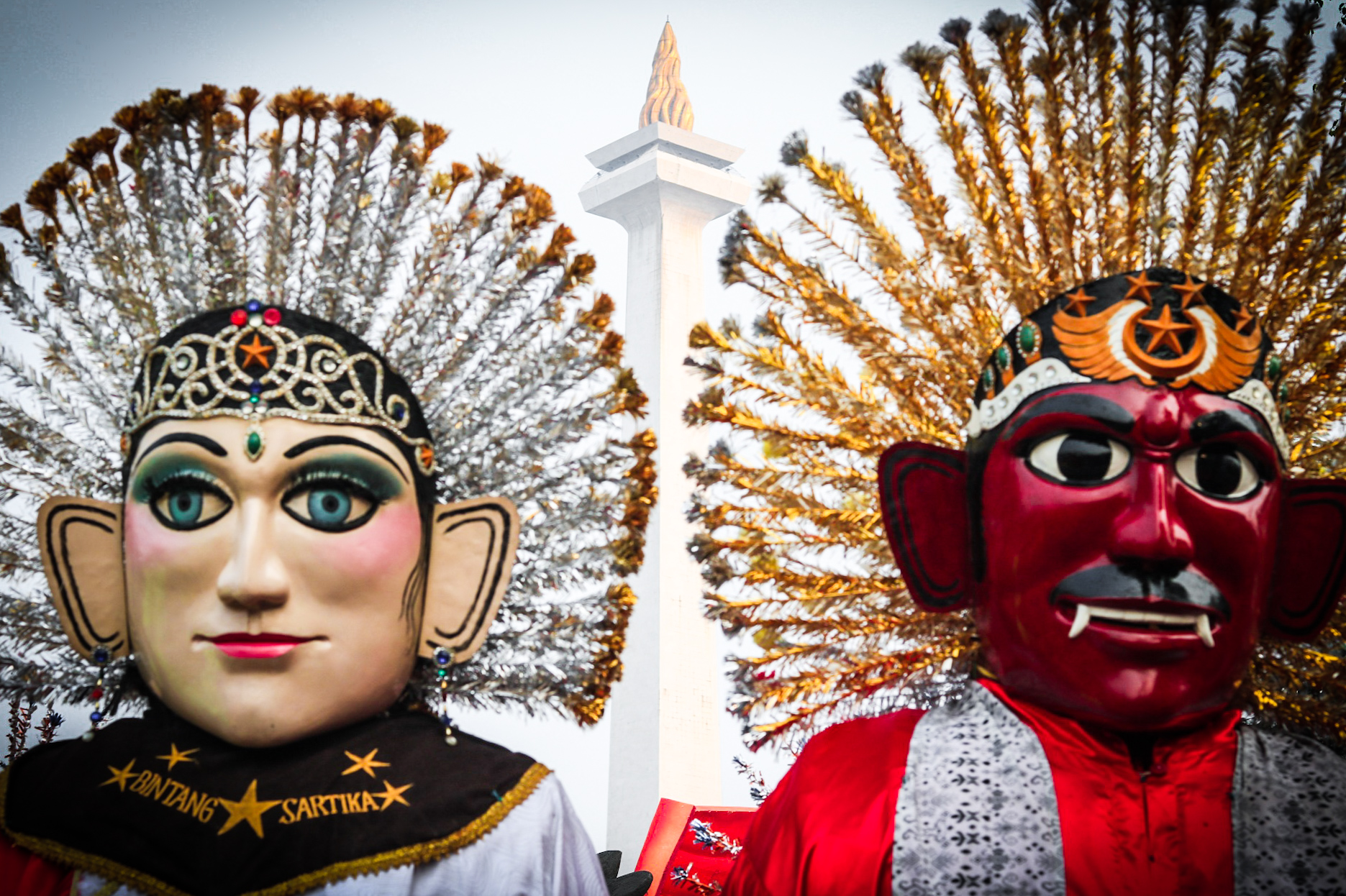
- Ondel-ondel is a form of Betawi folk performance which is often performed at public parties.
- Genre: Traditional puppet
- Instrument(s): Gamelan, Gambang, Gong, Tanjidor
- Inventor: Betawi people
- Origin: Indonesia

Ondel-ondel is a large puppet figure featured in the Betawi folk performance in Jakarta, Indonesia. As an icon of Jakarta, ondel-ondel is often utilized as a pair for livening up festivals or welcoming guests of honor. It is one of a few Indonesian folk performances that has survived modernization and is still being regularly performed.

The musical accompaniment for the ondel-ondel performance varies with regions, occasions, and groups of performances.

== History ==
=== Archaic and colonial period ===
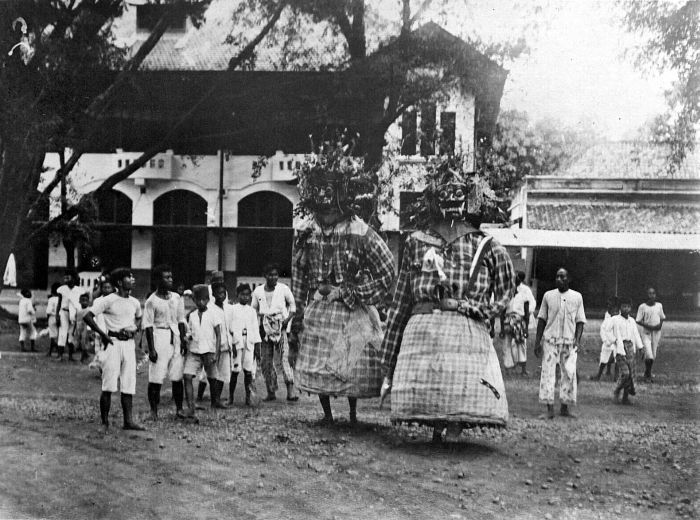
An archaic ondel-ondel during the colonial period, performed at the opening of the new wing of Hotel des Indes.

Traditionally, the figure of ondel-ondel was known as barongan, a word derived from barong, a protective spirit that can be found across the animistic Austronesian culture long before the arrival of Hinduism. The figure was performed around villages to protect against calamities or ward off wandering evil spirits. It was thought of as a representation of the ancestors protecting the village.

The first record of ondel-ondel is probably done by British merchant William Scot, who noted that een reus raksasa ("a giant Rakshasa") was one of the figures included in the procession led by Prince Jayakarta Wijayakrama to celebrate the circumcision of 10-year-old Prince Abdul Mafakhir in the year 1605.

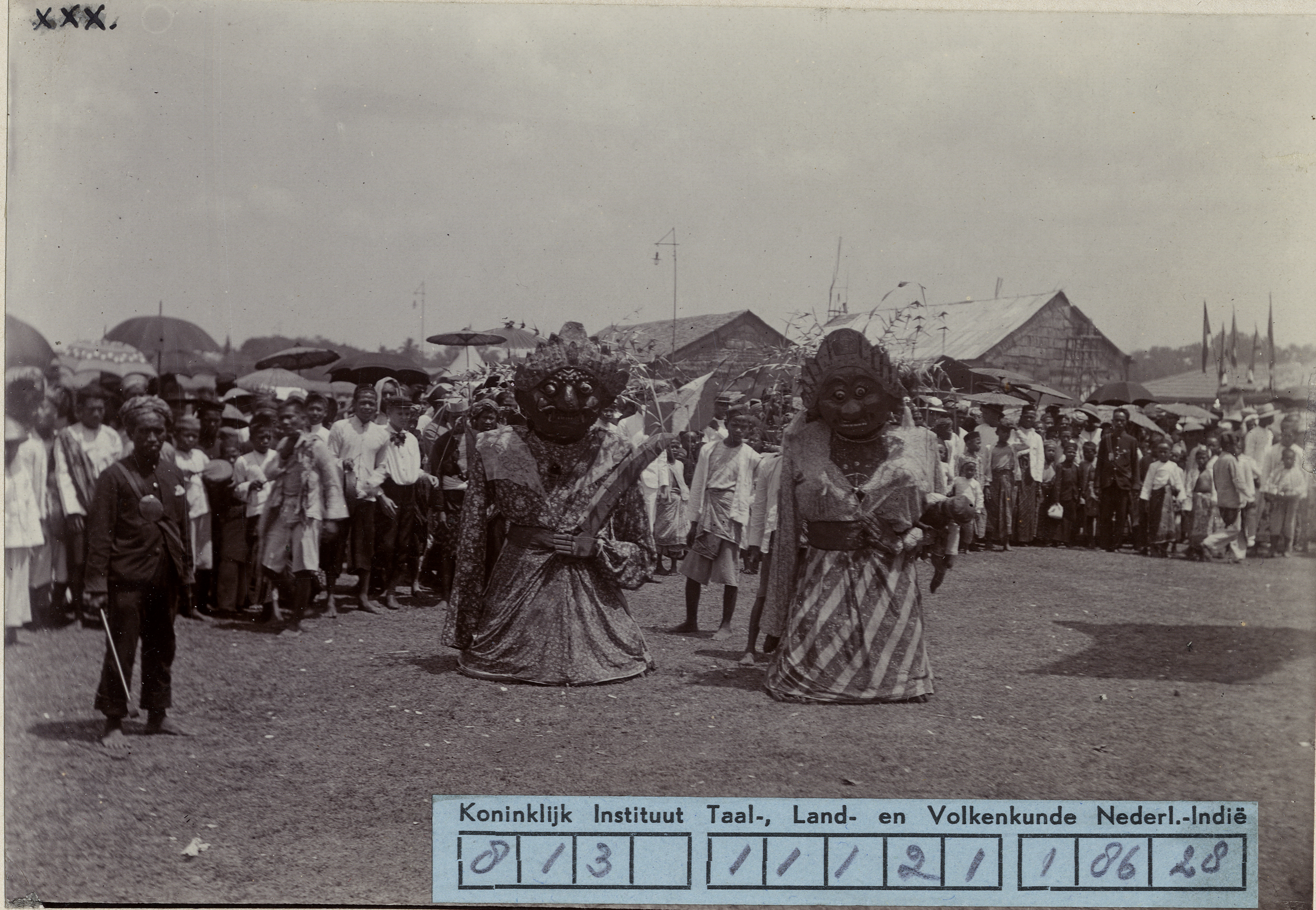
"Barong dance" of Batavia

Up until the modern colonial period, ondel-ondel figure was recorded to have a gruesome facial feature such as large fangs and menacing goggle-eyes, similar to the Balinese Barong or Rangda figure. The ondel-ondel was performed on the streets and asked by-passers for opium. When opium was banned in the Dutch East Indies, the ondel-ondel would ask for cigars instead, which is done by placing a cigar in their mouth. During this period, local Betawi people still believed that ondel-ondel could protect a village against diseases such as chickenpox. Ondel-ondel performance was recorded by American writer E.R. Scidmore who visited Batavia in the late 19th century and noted a street performance in the form of dances, which could be the ondel-ondel performance.

The construction of an ondel-ondel must follow a certain ritual. Before the construction of an ondel-ondel, the maker must give offerings in the form of incense, kembang tujuh rupa, and rice porridge. The offering was intended to ensure the process of making ondel-ondel is a smooth one and to allow a benevolent spirit to enter the figure.

=== Modern custom ===
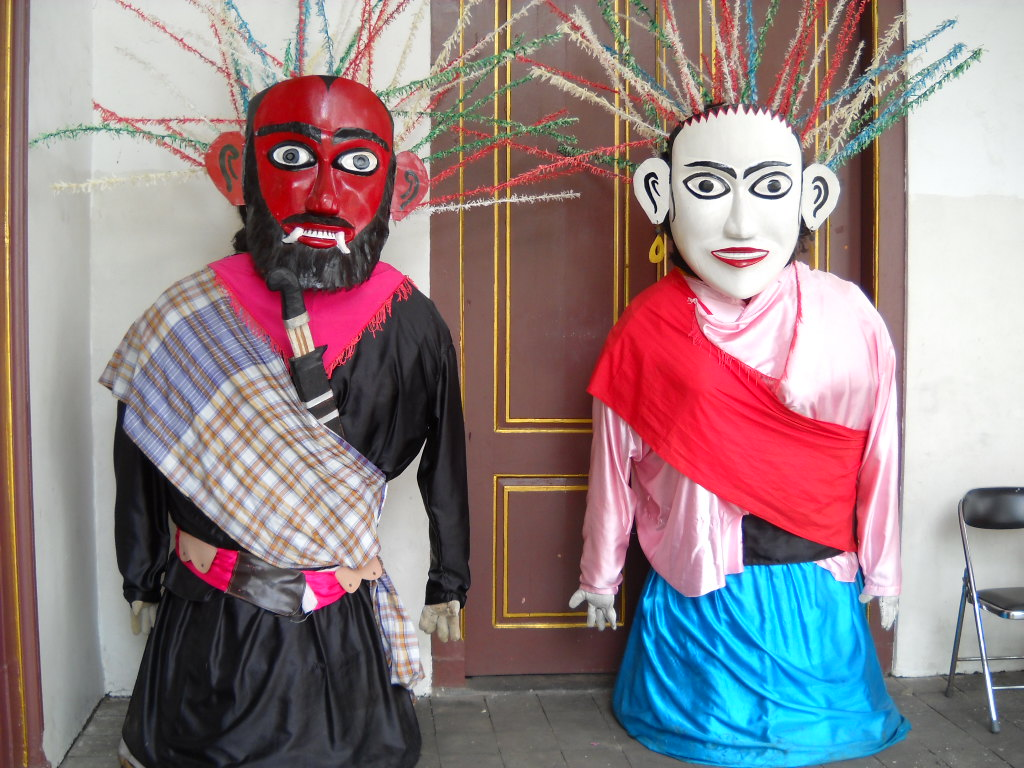
Traditional male & female ondel-ondel in Wayang Museum, Jakarta

After the independence of Indonesia, the function of ondel-ondel was shifted from a protective spirit figure into an iconic figure of entertainment. Governor of Jakarta Ali Sadikin (1966-1977), in an attempt to introduce a modern Jakarta, decided to modernize the ondel-ondel by removing some of the gruesome elements and making them more friendly-looking. Around this period, ondel-ondel was made a mascot of Jakarta and was always included in celebratory events such as the inauguration of new buildings, welcoming guests of honor, or attending a wedding ceremony. Ondel-ondel performance is then always accompanied by Betawi music such as tanjidor or gambang kromong.

== The figure ==
Ondel-ondel performance at Jalan Cempaka Putih Tengah 22A, Central Jakarta, Indonesia. The song playing here is the traditional Betawi song "Sirih Kuning".

Ondel-ondel is a hollow figure about 2.5 meters tall and dressed in brightly colored garments which consist of shoulder belts (kain selempang dada). The head of ondel-ondel is typically made of wood. Ondel-ondel wears a headdress known as kembang kelape (coconut's flower) which is made from dried coconut leaves that have been shredded lengthways and are wrapped with colorful paper. Ondel-ondel are always showcased in pairs of male and female. The male puppet traditionally has its face painted red, while the female is painted white. The body of ondel-ondel is constructed of bamboo which is relatively light and is lifted by one person from the inside of the puppet.

== Similar performances ==
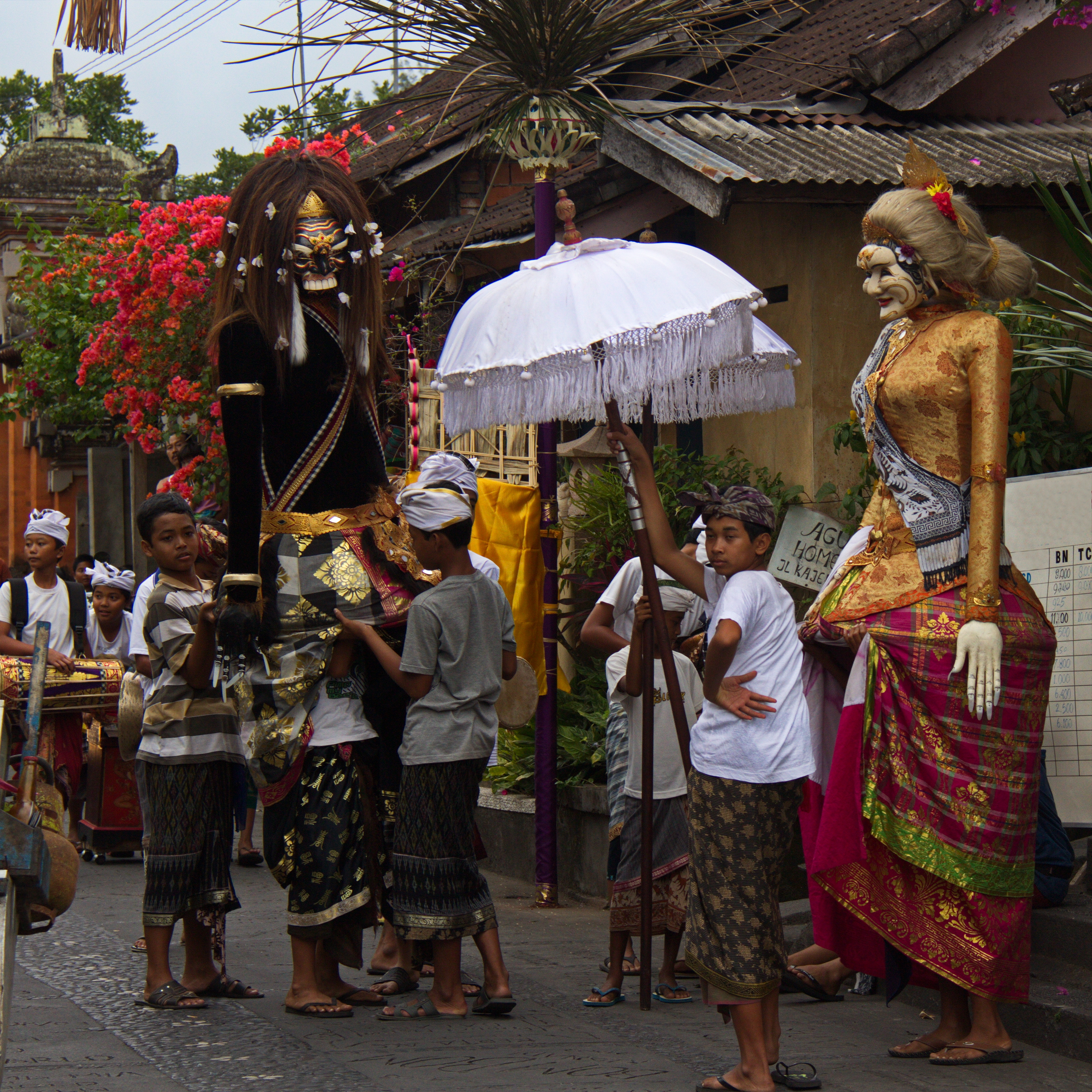
Barong Landung from Bali is similar to Betawi Ondel-ondel

A form of folk performance similar to ondel-ondel is practiced in other parts of Indonesia. In the Pasundan region, it is known as badawang, while in Central Java it is called barongan buncis. In Bali, it is better known as barong landung.

== See also ==
- Barong (mythology)
- Topeng
- Higantes
- Processional Giant
- Gaarudi Gombe (India)
