= Tian mi mi =

1979 song by Teresa Teng

"Tian Mi Mi"

Single by Teresa Teng

from the album Tian Mi Mi
- Language: Mandarin; Cantonese
- Released: 20 September 1979
- Recorded: 1979
- Genre: Folk-pop
- Length: 3:31
- Label: Kolin; PolyGram
- Composers: Teresa Teng; Dasimah
- Lyricist: Zhuang Nu

"Tian Mi Mi" (Chinese: 甜蜜蜜; pinyin: Tián Mì Mì; literally "sweet honey") is a song recorded by Taiwanese singer Teresa Teng. It was first made available on 20 September 1979 and was later included on her Mandarin album of the same name, released through PolyGram Records in November of the same year. The song's lyrics were written by Zhuang Nu while the music was adapted from a 1940s Indonesian gambang kromong folk song about sampan boats, called "Dayung Sampan", by the pasindhèn Dasimah.

Teng recorded a version of the song for her first Cantonese album, Irreconcilable (勢不兩立), released on 18 December 1980, which was titled "The Day I Met You".

"Tian Mi Mi", a love song about someone captivated by a familiar and sweet smile, went on to achieve widespread popularity in the Sinophone world and remains one of Teng's most famous works. In 1996, the Hong Kong film Comrades: Almost a Love Story was released as a tribute to Teng, following her death a year prior, with the film's Chinese title named after "Tian Mi Mi".

== Background and history ==
"Tian Mi Mi" was adapted from a 1940s Indonesian folk song titled "Dayung Sampan", which was popular in Indonesia and Singapore. Teng produced an Indonesian-language cover of "Dayung Sampan" while on tour in Southeast Asia in 1978. On 14 February 1979, she was arrested in Japan and deported to Hong Kong for using an Indonesian passport, which Japan found had been obtained from the Indonesian embassy in Hong Kong under suspicious circumstances. Fearing punishment in Taiwan, as the island nation was under an autocratic government at the time, Teng travelled to the United States and became a student at the University of Southern California. She chose the U.S. as she was unable to stay permanently in Hong Kong and was banned from re-entering Japan for a year. To fulfill her contractual obligation, she composed a Mandarin Chinese cover of "Dayung Sampan" while studying, which became "Tian Mi Mi".

=== Release ===
"Tian Mi Mi" was first included on Teng's album An Unforgettable Day (難忘的一天), released in Taiwan through Kolin Records on 20 September 1979. The track was later included on an eponymous album, released through PolyGram Records on 15 November 1979, which became certified Platinum by the International Federation of the Phonographic Industry Hong Kong. The following year, Teng recorded a Cantonese version of the song, titled "The Day I Met You" (結識你那一天; Cantonese Yale: Git sik nei na yat tin), which was released as part of her first Cantonese-language album, Irreconcilable (勢不兩立; Sai bat leung laap), on 18 December 1980.

== Composition and lyrics ==
Huang Yuyuan, a researcher at National Taiwan Museum, noted that the original Indonesian song was about fishers gossiping and yelling at each other. The lyrics of the Chinese version were reinterpreted into a more playful and sweet tone, penned by lyricist Zhuang Nu, who would work with Teng on many of her later songs. Zhuang wrote the lyrics in roughly five minutes after being told he was writing for Teresa Teng. The lyrics for the Cantonese version were written by Lo Kwak-chan.

Hua Hsu from The New Yorker described the song as "a loungy ballad about someone with a sweet and disarmingly familiar smile". Teng sings "Where have I seen you before", before remembering: "Ah—in my dreams". Hua noted that "Despite this sense of bewitched yearning, she sounds calm, curious, almost teasing".

== In popular culture ==
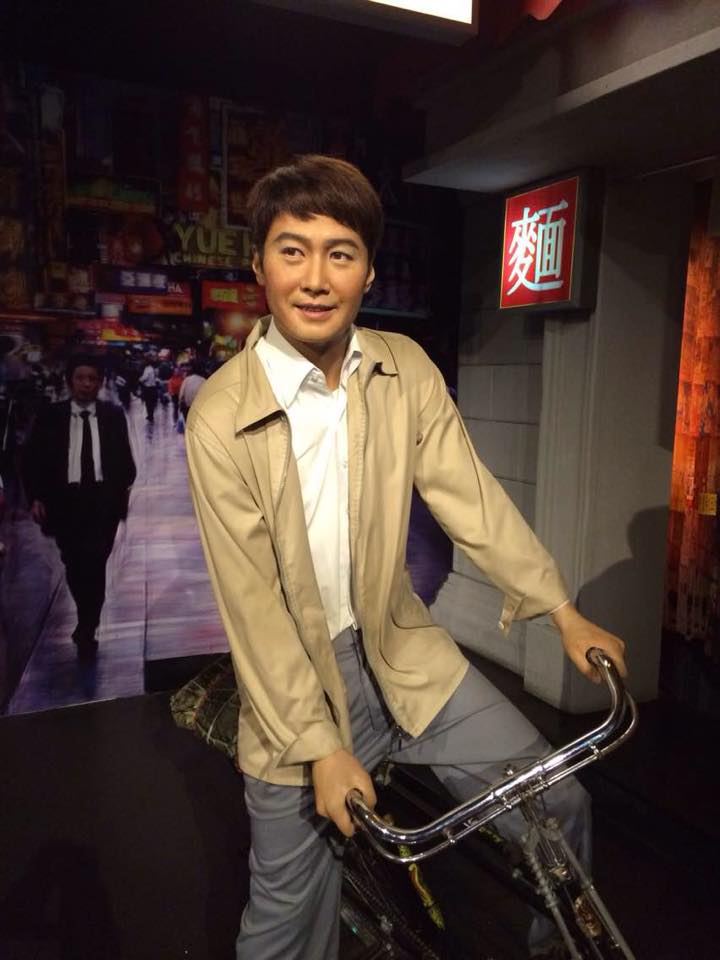
Leon Lai's wax figure based on his character in Comrades: Almost a Love Story, which was named after and prominently features "Tian Mi Mi".

In 1996, the Hong Kong film Comrades: Almost a Love Story, starring Maggie Cheung and Leon Lai, was released as a tribute to Teng following her death in 1995. The Chinese title of the film was named after "Tian Mi Mi". Teng's music was featured prominently throughout the film, with the two characters' favourite singer being Teng herself. Comrades: Almost a Love Story received critical acclaim from film critics. In 2005, it placed at number 28 in a Hong Kong Film Awards ranking of the 100 greatest Chinese motion pictures of the past 100 years. In 2011, it was ranked number 16 on Golden Horse Awards' list of the 100 Greatest Chinese-Language Films, voted on by 122 industry professionals. China Internet Information Center evaluated the film by writing, "[Tian Mi Mi] bridges the scenes, drawing together the tale of the evolving affection between the two principal players. [...] In many ways the film owes its success to the subtle strains of the tune."

== Legacy ==
China Internet Information Center called "Tian Mi Mi" one of the singer's signature works, remarking how "Her voice moved generations of Chinese people" and perhaps "offered spiritual solace for youngsters of the seventies and eighties". The organization conveyed that despite the significant changes in the music industry since its initial release, the song "continues to resonate with those it touched long ago and with new fans who discover it every year." It has also become a love song used by young couples to express their feelings to each other. Various artists have covered it, including Faye Wong, Stephen Chow, Leon Lai, Yu Quan, and Jane Zhang. In December 2008, on the 30th anniversary of the reform and opening up of China, Southern Weekly named "Tian Mi Mi" one of the top ten classic Chinese pop songs of the past 30 years.

== Luhan version ==
"Tian Mi Mi (Sweet As Honey)"

Single by Luhan

from the album Comrades: Almost a Love Story OST
- Released: 3 February 2015
- Recorded: 2015
- Genre: Mandopop
- Length: 4:03
- Songwriters: Dasimah; Zhuang Nu

Chinese singer Luhan recorded the song for the soundtrack of the 2015 mainland Chinese release of the 1996 film Comrades: Almost a Love Story. In January 2015, it was announced that Luhan would be singing the theme song for the film's release in China, according to Chinese media outlet Sina. The movie, directed by Hong Kong filmmaker Peter Chan, was originally released in 1996. Due to the political tension between Hong Kong and mainland China, however, it took 19 years for the film to be approved for release in China. A member of the production team explained, "Peter Chan asked [Chinese musician] Dou Feng to arrange for the recording of a new version of the theme song, and requested that Luhan sing for the film's soundtrack." Director Peter Chan is said to have asked Luhan to participate due to his gentle and clear voice, as he felt it would be effective in expressing the emotions of the song. The song was officially released on 3 February 2015.
