= Gambang =

Gambang may refer to:

- Gambang (instrument), xylophone-like instrument used among people of Indonesia
- Gambang, Pahang, town in Kuantan District, Pahang, Malaysia

== See also ==
- Gambang kromong, a traditional orchestra of Betawi people
