= Tian Mi Mi (album) =

Studio album by Teresa Teng
- Released: November 15, 1979
- Recorded: 1979
- Genre: Mandopop
- Length: 38:20
- Language: Mandarin
- Label: Polydor

Teresa Teng chronology
Small Town Story (1979)	Tian Mi Mi (1979)	Zai Shui Yi Fang (1980)

Singles from Tian Mi Mi
- 1. "Tian Mi Mi" Released: November 15, 1979

Tian Mi Mi (Chinese: 甜蜜蜜) is a Mandarin studio album by Taiwanese recording artist Teresa Teng. It was released under Polydor Records Hong Kong on November 15, 1979. It features the hit titular single "Tian Mi Mi", which is based on the Indonesian folk song titled "Dayung Sampan".

== Reception ==
The album was certified platinum by the International Federation of the Phonographic Industry Hong Kong.

== Track listing ==
Side A
No.	Title	Length
1.	"Tian Mi Mi" (甜蜜蜜)	3:31
2.	"You Are in My Dream" (你在我梦里)	4:05
3.	"Jìyǔ Duō Qíngrén" (寄语多情人)	2:41
4.	"Huī Bié" (挥别)	3:02
5.	"Yíwàng" (遗忘)	3:18
6.	"Where to Find Dreams" (梦向何处寻)	2:56
Total length:		19:33

Side B
No.	Title	Length
7.	"An Unforgettable Day" (难忘的一天)	3:52
8.	"Ài Zài Wǒ Xīnzhōng" (爱在我心中)	3:12
9.	"Cuì Hú Hán" (翠湖寒)	2:50
10.	"Gǔ Shù Xià" (古树下)	3:13
11.	"Yěshēng Huā" (野生花)	2:26
12.	"Zhèn Zhèn Chūnfēng Róu" (阵阵春风柔)	3:14
Total length:		18:47

== Credits and personnel ==
- Teresa Teng – vocals, composer
- Zhuang Nu – lyricist
- Sun Yi – lyricist
- Chiung Yao – lyricist
- Weng Ching-hsi – composer
- Gu Yue – composer

== Certifications ==
Region	Certification	Certified units/sales
Hong Kong (IFPI Hong Kong)	Platinum	50,000^{*}
^{*} Sales figures based on certification alone.
