= Higantes Festival =

Annual festival In Angono, Rizal, Philippines

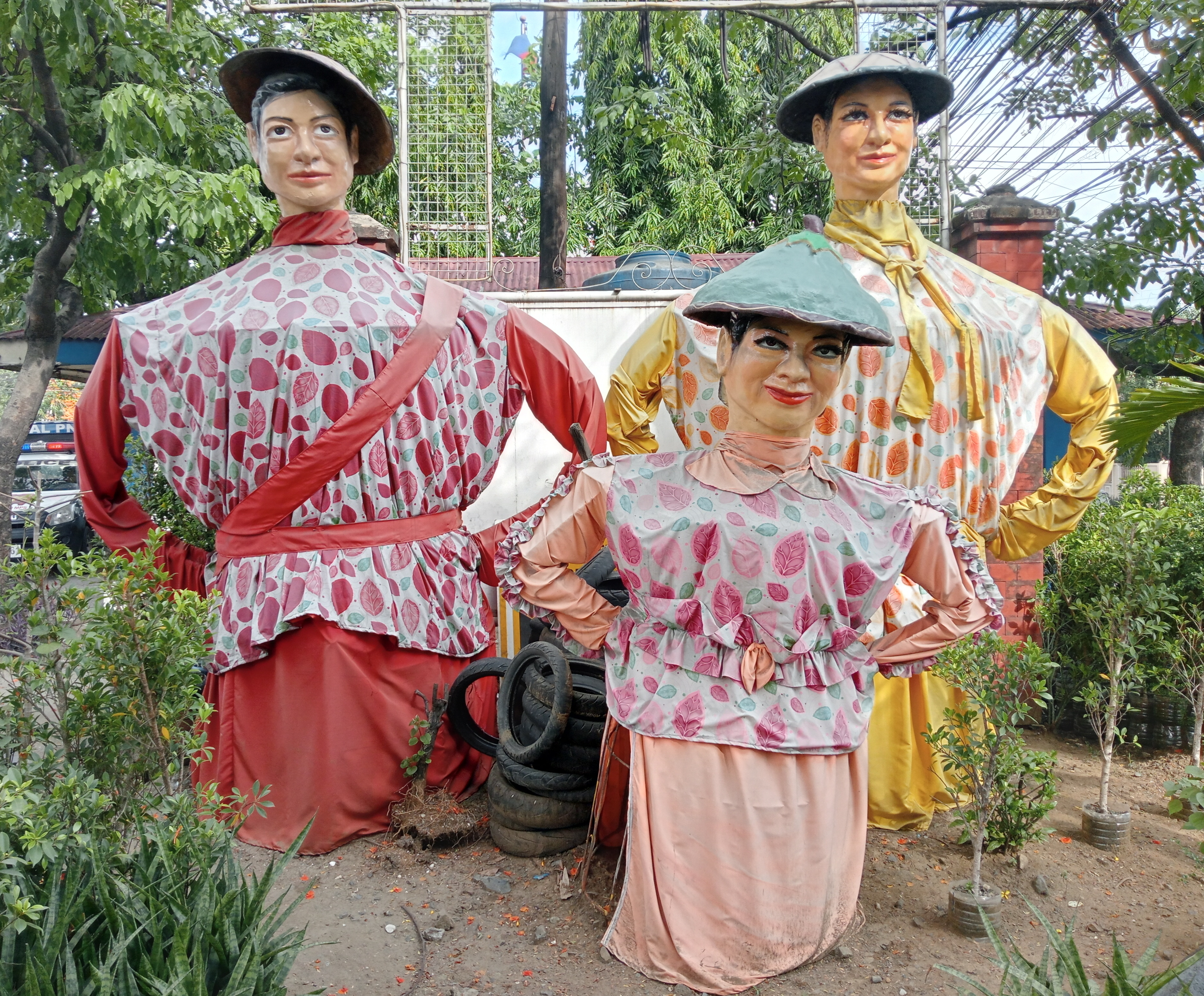
- Examples of higantes effigies
- Observed by: Angono, Rizal, Angono Rizal Associations Worldwide
- Liturgical color: Red, White
- Significance: formerly associated with the Feast of Pope St. Clement I
- Celebrations: Parade of papier-mâché giant puppets
- Date: 16 November
- Frequency: Annual

The Higantes Festival is a local festival held annually In Angono, Rizal, Philippines, where hundreds of giant papier-mâché puppets are paraded, representing the common people's mockery of the bad hacienda (land) owners of the past during Spanish colonial rule.

== Origin ==
A professor from the University of the Philippines explaining the art of puppetry in the Philippines, which includes higantes puppets.

The origin of the festival dates back to Spanish colonial rule, around the late 1800s, where the wealthy ruling class who ruled Angono as their hacienda strictly prohibited the common people from celebrating, except for one single festival in the entire year. The hardworking common people used the higantes puppets in their once-a-year festival, rendering the papier-mâché giants to look like the hacienderos, mocking the owners throughout the festivity. The art of papier-mâché was said to have been learned by the common folk from Spanish friars through unstated means. The giant puppets depict a man or woman in multiple costumes, with their faces making commands, while their hands on their waist.

== Observance ==
In present celebrations, the Angono townsfolk continue to build higantes to represent each barangay (village) for the festival's parade. Many forms of the puppets have been made, in accordance to the specialization of a village. For example, a village famous for their balut delicacy, would create a higante with a duck-shaped head. Majority of the giant puppets, however, continue to have human heads, with varying size and shapes. Over time, the number of puppets used during the parade have increased to more than a hundred.

=== Intangible heritage ===
Possibly the earliest form of puppetry in the Philippines, higante-making has been supported by the government to keep the festival and its related traditions alive. A three-meter-tall puppet usually takes about an entire month to make, where the most difficult part to create is the head, which is made of paper strips. The body of a higante puppet is made up of bamboo or rattan strips, to make it easier for a puppeteer to carry it during the long procession, which normally takes hours to finish. The handle's height is adjusted to see its legs when it is raised by 30 centimetres from the ground.

A related tradition with the higante puppets is the basaan, where people are doused with water during the parade to gain good fortune and blessings, sometimes when they shout for it. Among Christians, the water is said to symbolize Pope Clement I, martyred by drowning and the patron saint of fisherfolk. Another tradition is the parehadores, a marching band and a group of young girls in colorful costumes with wooden slippers. They are responsible for holding the sagwán, a wooden boat paddle symbolic of the devotees of Saint Clement, and while marching, the band and the girls before them shout, "¡Viva, San Clemente!” Other traditions are also known during the festival and its preparations.

== See also ==
- Ondel-ondel
- Processional giant – Costumed figures in European folklore
- Giant puppet – Type of large puppet
