= Tanjidor =

Indonesian traditional musical ensemble

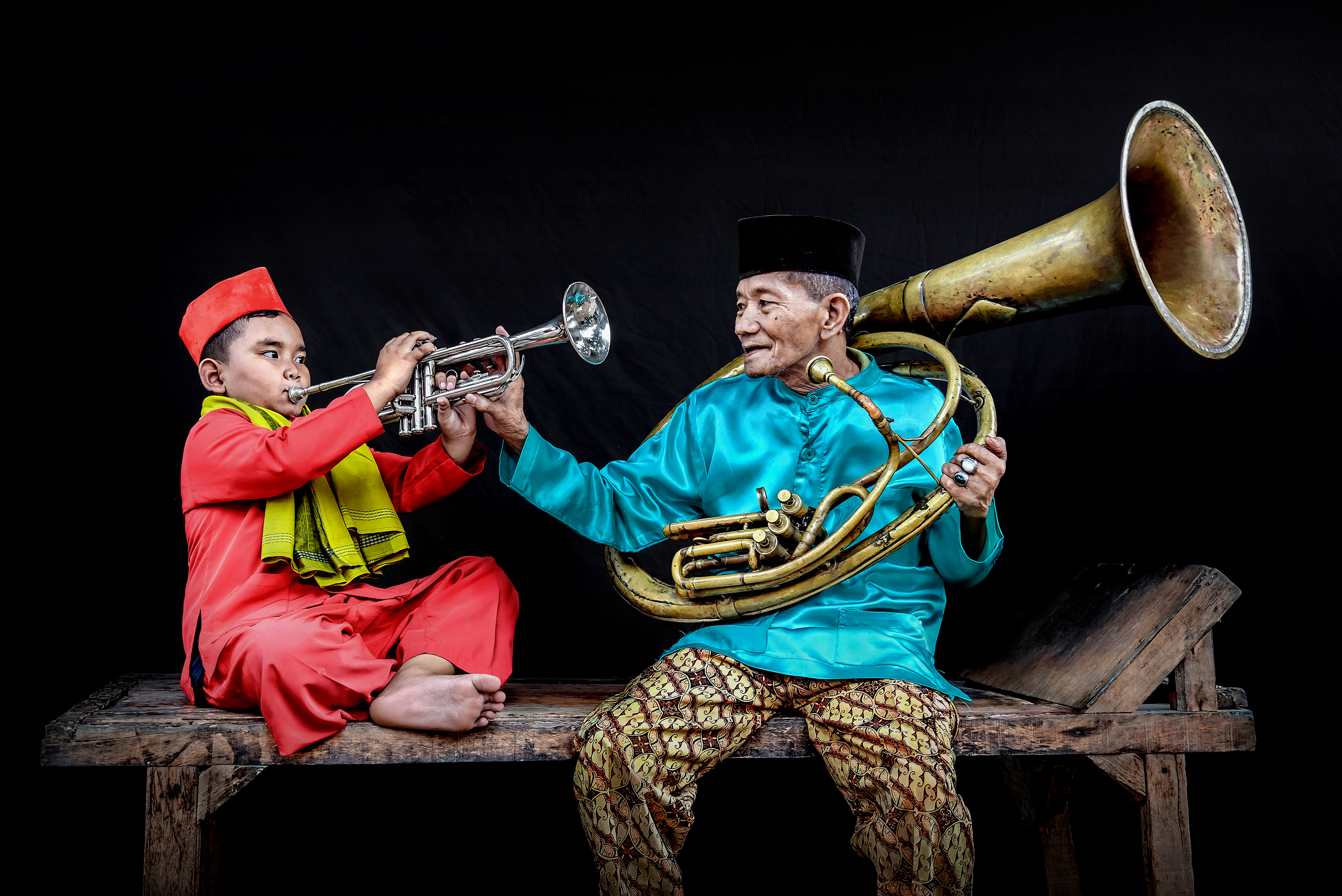
- Tanjidor is a traditional Betawi musical ensamble in the form of a modest orchestra, in this image using trumpet and helicon.
- Classification: Brass instrument; Wind instrument; Aerophone; Percussion instrument
- Developed: Indonesia

Related instruments
- Gambang kromong, Keroncong

Tanjidor is a traditional Betawi musical ensemble developed in Jakarta, Indonesia. This musical ensemble took the form of a modest orchestra and was developed in the 19th century, pioneered by Augustijn Michiels better known as Mayor Jantje, in the Citeureup area (or Citrap) on the outskirts of Batavia.

The instruments used are almost the same as a military band, a military-styled marching band, and/or corps of drums/drum and bugle corps, usually consisting of select wind and percussion instruments. Other than Jakarta, tanjidor musical ensemble is also can be found in Pontianak, West Kalimantan.

== Etymology ==
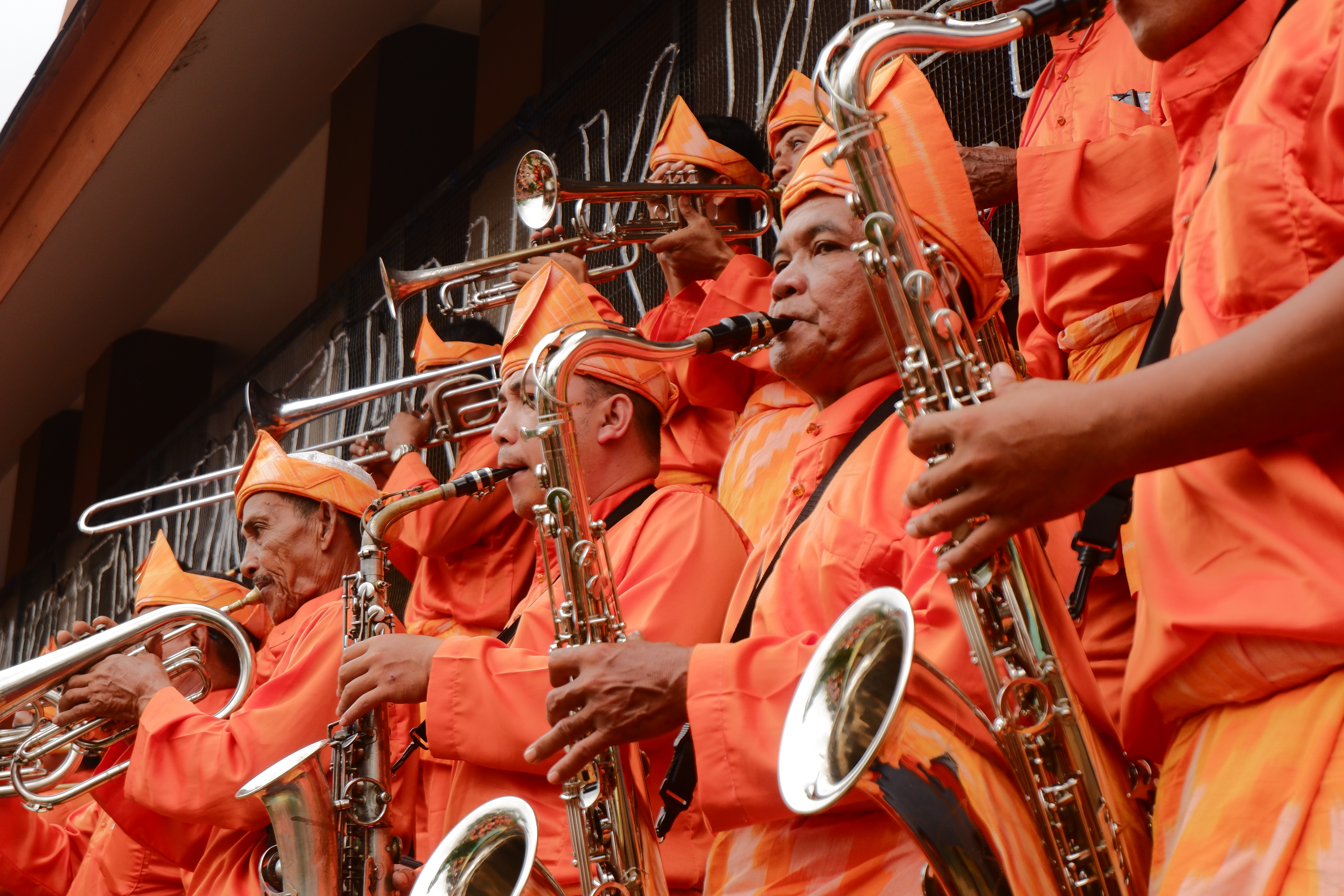
Malay Pontianak tanjidor performance

The term tanjidor was derived from Portuguese tanger (playing music) and tangedor (playing music outdoors), subsequently adopted in the Betawi language as tanji (music).

== Performance ==
Tanjidor music is commonly performed as traditional street music as well as festive music in several celebrations; such as the Cap Go Meh party in Betawi Chinese communities and Lebaran Betawi. Tanjidor bandsmen usually perform in traditional Betawi weddings to deliver the groom or take part in parades as a group as a general rule, with the band led by a bandmaster or conductor. In general, tanjidor music is usually performed during festive occasions in the Betawi community. They wear uniforms inspired by the traditional clothing of the Betawi of greater Jakarta and its suburban towns, with songkok caps by the male bandsmen.

This form of musical ensemble is the remnant of the colonial marching band brass and wind instrument and music of the Dutch East Indies era in Indonesia. Their music is usually cheerful songs akin to military march music from the Dutch colonial era, which were usually played by military bandsmen of the Royal Netherlands Navy and the Royal Netherlands East Indies Army, and later on by bandsmen of the first generation bands of the Indonesian National Armed Forces.

== Instruments ==
A fixed number of instruments cannot be used in a tanjidor band or ensemble. It can be as little as a brass duo of tuba and trumpet, to a quite complete wind orchestra consisting of number of wind and percussion instruments. The musical instruments being played in tanjidor among others are:

- Baritone
- Bass drum
- Clarinets
  - including Bass clarinets
- Cornets
- Cymbals (Clash cymbals)
- Euphonium
- Flugelhorn
- Flute
- French horn
- Glockenspiel
- Helicon
- Mellophone
- Piccolo
- Snare drum
- Sousaphone
- Saxophone
- Tenor drum
- Tenor horn
- Tuba
- Trombone
  - including Valve trombones
- Trumpets

Played in concert settings:

- Cabasa
- Conga
- Drum kit
- Vibraphone
- Xylophone
- Tambourine
- Timbales
- Timpani
- Maracas
- Marimba
- Electric guitars
- Electronic keyboards

== See also ==
- Gambang kromong
- Gamelan
- Kulintang
- Lenong
- Talempong
- Music of Indonesia
