= Benny Chan (filmmaker) =

Hong Kong filmmaker (1961–2020)

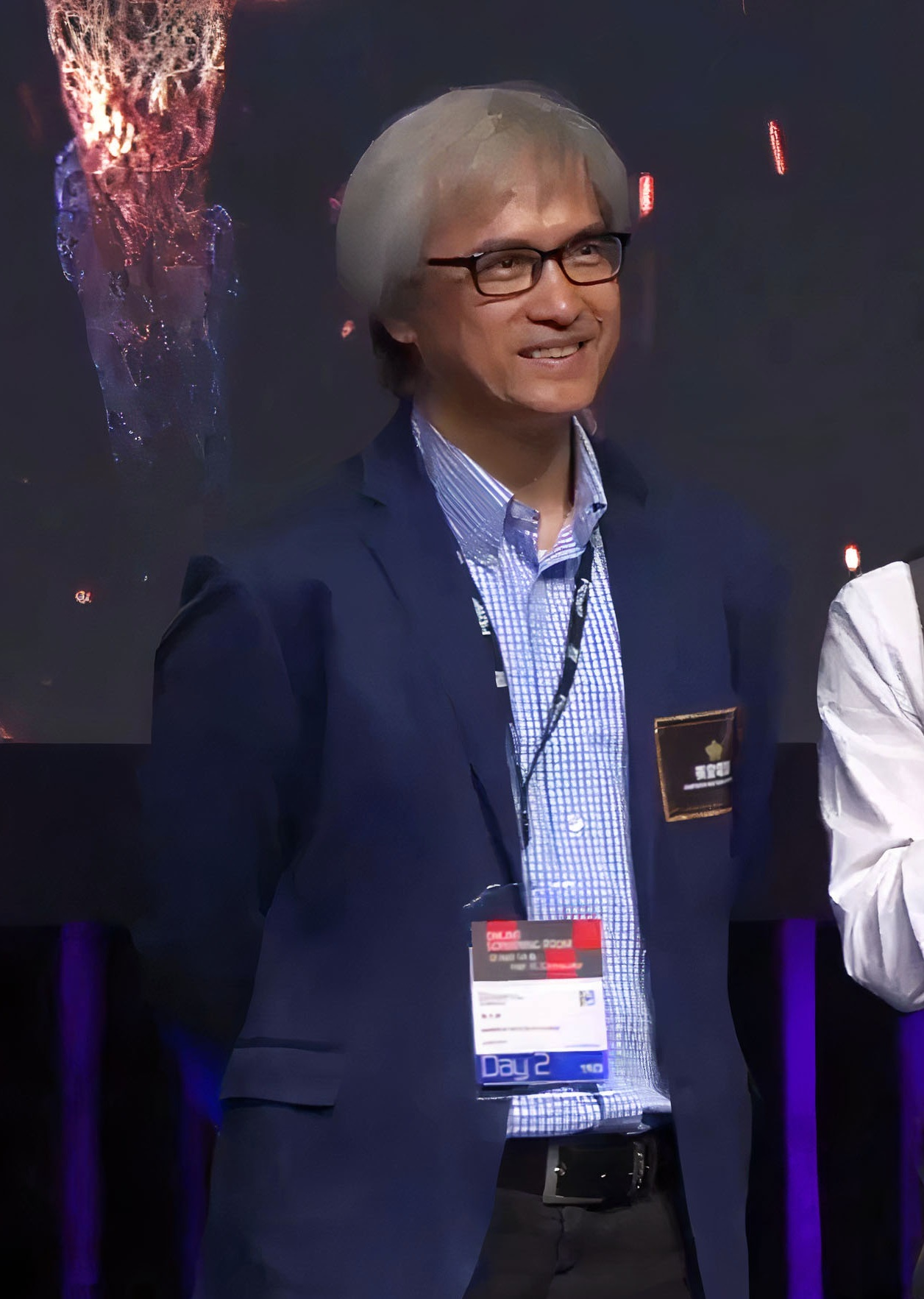
- Chan in 2019
- Born: 24 October 1961; Kowloon, British Hong Kong
- Died: 23 August 2020 (aged 58); Hong Kong Sanatorium & Hospital, Wan Chai, Hong Kong
- Occupations: Film director; film producer; screenwriter
- Years active: 1981–2020
- Notable work: Full list
- Awards: Full list

Chinese name
- Traditional Chinese: 陳木勝
- Simplified Chinese: 陈木胜
Transcriptions
Standard Mandarin
- Hanyu Pinyin: Chén Mùshèng
Yue: Cantonese
- Jyutping: Can4 Meok6 Sing3

Signature
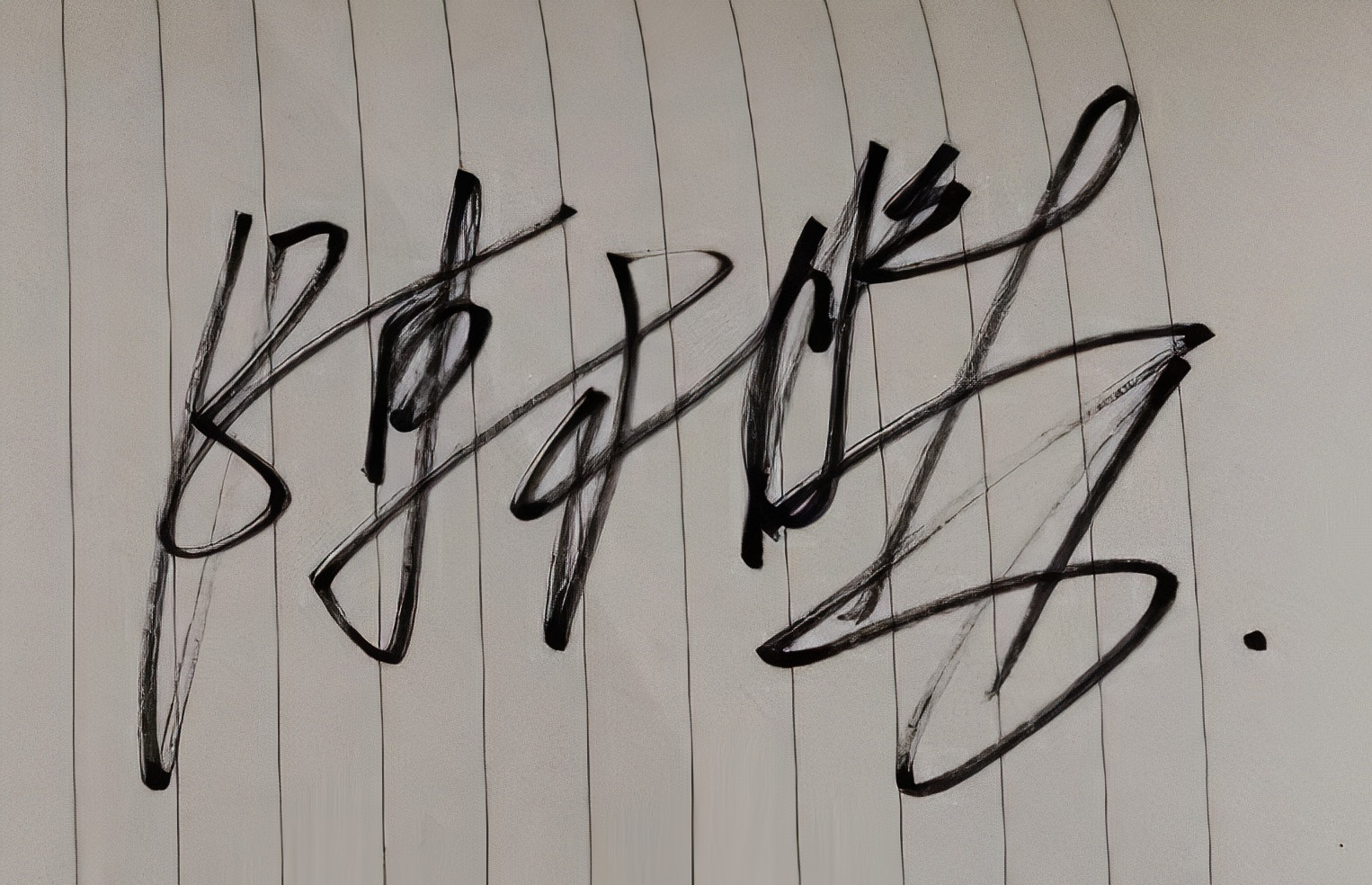

Benny Chan Muk-sing (simplified Chinese: 陈木胜; traditional Chinese: 陳木勝; Jyutping: can4 muk6 sing3; 24 October 1961 – 23 August 2020) was a Hong Kong filmmaker. He was known for his action crime films which are full of brutal violence, absurd humor and outstanding choreographies.

He was nominated for Best Director six times at the Hong Kong Film Awards, include Big Bullet, Heroic Duo, New Police Story, Connected, The White Storm and Raging Fire. His last film, Raging Fire, posthumously earned him Best Director award at the 40th Hong Kong Film Awards and the film went on to win Best Film award at the ceremony.

== Life and career ==
Born and raised in Kowloon, Benny Chan first accepted a job in 1981 at Rediffusion Television working in continuity. The following year, he joined TVB, becoming a production assistant to Johnnie To. By 1985, Chan had worked his way up to being a television director, co-directing television series like The Flying Fox of Snowy Mountain (1985). In addition to directing most of the episodes of The Flying Fox of Snowy Mountain, he also wrote the scripts for all 40 episodes. Chan had gained experience as an executive director for a couple of films between 1987 and 1988, and had also directed and produced a few television series for Asia Television in 1989.

Chan's debut as a film director began with A Moment of Romance (1990), which was produced by To. During the 1990s, he directed films like Big Bullet (1996), Who Am I? (1998), and Gen-X Cops (1999). For his work on Big Bullet, which he co-wrote, directed, and produced, Chan was nominated for Best Director at the 1997 Hong Kong Film Awards. The film also won awards for Best Film Editing at both the Hong Kong Film Awards and the 1996 Golden Horse Film Festival. He also continued to work in television, directing episodes of the 1995 adaptation of Fist of Fury starring Donnie Yen.

Working in exclusively the film industry since 1998's Who Am I?, Chan continued to work on various projects. Since Who Am I?, he continued to direct more of Jackie Chan's movies, such as New Police Story (2004), Rob-B-Hood (2006), and Shaolin (2011). He also directed Heroic Duo (2003), Divergence (2005), Connected (2008), and The White Storm (2013). Prior to his death, Chan was working on Raging Fire, which he gave to a colleague to complete post-production work after his cancer diagnosis.

== Illness and death ==
In 2019, Chan was diagnosed with nasopharyngeal cancer after feeling unwell while working on Raging Fire. During the last few months of his life, he was hospitalized at Prince of Wales Hospital.

On 23 August 2020, Chan died at the Hong Kong Sanatorium & Hospital in Wan Chai, Hong Kong.

== Filmography ==
Year	Title	Credits			Note(s)
Year	Title	Director	Writer	Producer	Note(s)
1988	Let's Rage the Gangland	Yes	No	No	—N/a
1990	A Moment of Romance	Yes	No	No	—N/a
1991	Son on the Run	Yes	No	No	—N/a
1992	What a Hero!	Yes	No	No	—N/a
1993	The Magic Crane	Yes	No	No	—N/a
1993	A Moment of Romance II	Yes	No	No	—N/a
1994	Wounded Tracks	Yes	No	No	—N/a
1995	Happy Hour	Yes	No	No	Cameo
1995	Man Wanted	Yes	No	Yes	—N/a
1996	Big Bullet	Yes	Yes	Yes	—N/a
1996	They Don't Care About Us	No	No	Yes	—N/a
1998	Who Am I?	Yes	No	No	—N/a
1999	Gen-X Cops	Yes	Yes	Yes	—N/a
2000	Gen-Y Cops	Yes	No	Yes	Hong Kong-United States co-production
2001	Final Romance	No	No	Yes	—N/a
2002	If U Care...	No	No	Yes	—N/a
2003	Heroic Duo	Yes	No	Yes	—N/a
2004	New Police Story	Yes	No	Yes	—N/a
2005	Divergence	Yes	No	Yes	—N/a
2006	Rob-B-Hood	Yes	Yes	Yes	—N/a
2007	Invisible Target	Yes	Yes	Yes	—N/a
2008	Connected	Yes	Yes	Yes	—N/a
2010	City Under Siege	Yes	Yes	Yes	Also editor
2011	Shaolin	Yes	No	Yes	—N/a
2013	The White Storm	Yes	Yes	Yes	—N/a
2015	Little Big Master	No	No	Yes	—N/a
2016	Call of Heroes	Yes	Yes	Yes	—N/a
2017	Meow	Yes	No	Yes	—N/a
2021	Raging Fire	Yes	Yes	Yes	Posthumous release
—N/a	The Trier of Fact	No	No	Yes	Credited as the producer in the pre-production stage

Television

- Fist of Fury 精武門 (1995)

Executive producer

- Goodbye Darling (1987)
- Fatal Love (1988)

== Awards and nominations ==
Year	Work	Awards	Category	Results
1996	Big Bullet	16th Hong Kong Film Awards	Best Director	Nominated
1996	Big Bullet	16th Hong Kong Film Awards	Best Film	Nominated
2004	Heroic Duo	23rd Hong Kong Film Awards	Best Director	Nominated
2005	New Police Story	24th Hong Kong Film Awards	Best Director	Nominated
2005	New Police Story	24th Hong Kong Film Awards	Best Film	Nominated
2005	New Police Story	25th Golden Rooster Awards	Best Film	Nominated
2005	New Police Story	28th Hundred Flowers Awards	Best Film	Nominated
2009	Connected	28th Hong Kong Film Awards	Best Director	Nominated
2014	The White Storm	33rd Hong Kong Film Awards	Best Director	Nominated
2014	The White Storm	33rd Hong Kong Film Awards	Best Film	Nominated
2016	Little Big Master	35th Hong Kong Film Awards	Best Film	Nominated
2021	Raging Fire	13th Macau International Film Festival	Best Director	Won
2021	Raging Fire	13th Macau International Film Festival	Best Film	Nominated
2021	Raging Fire	28th Hong Kong Film Critics Society Awards	Best Director	Won
2021	Raging Fire	28th Hong Kong Film Critics Society Awards	Film of Merit	Won
2021	Raging Fire	Hong Kong Film Directors' Guild Awards	Best Film	Won
2021	Raging Fire	Hong Kong Film Directors' Guild Awards	Best Director	Nominated
2021	Raging Fire	Hong Kong Screenwriters' Guild Awards	Best Recommended Screenplay	Won
2022	Raging Fire	40th Hong Kong Film Awards	Best Director	Won
2022	Raging Fire	40th Hong Kong Film Awards	Best Film	Won
