= Big Bullet =

1996 Hong Kong film by Benny Chan

- Hong Kong poster for Big Bullet
- Directed by: Benny Chan
- Written by: Joe Ma; Susan Chan; Benny Chan
- Produced by: Benny Chan
- Starring: Lau Ching-wan; Jordan Chan; Theresa Lee; Cheung Tat-ming; Francis Ng; Anthony Wong; Yu Rongguang; Lam Sheung Yee; Jimmy King
- Cinematography: Arthur Wong
- Edited by: Cheung Ka-fai; Peter Cheung
- Music by: Peter Kam
- Production company: Golden Harvest
- Distributed by: Golden Harvest
- Release date: 26 July 1996
- Running time: 90 minutes
- Country: Hong Kong
- Language: Cantonese
- Box office: HK$9,771,575

Big Bullet (Chinese: 衝鋒隊怒火街頭; pinyin: Chong feng dui nu huo jie tou) is a 1996 Hong Kong action film directed and produced by Benny Chan, and written by Benny Chan, Joe Ma and Susan Chan. It won awards for film editing at the 1996 Golden Horse Film Festival and the 16th Hong Kong Film Awards.

== Plot ==
After assaulting his tactical commander during a raid gone sour, a dedicated but temperamental cop Sergeant Bill Chu is transferred to the Emergency Unit, long considered to be the police force's dumping ground for problem cops. Together with his fellow EU patrol officers, Bill continues to fight crime and stops the Professor's attempt to smuggle confiscated money which he managed to retrieve from Interpol HQ out of Hong Kong via the British air base.

== Release ==
Big Bullet was released in Hong Kong on 26 July 1996. It grossed a total of HK$9,771,575. At the 16th Hong Kong Film Awards, Big Bullet was nominated for seven awards: Best Film, Best Director (Benny Chan), Best Actor (Lau Ching-wan), Best Supporting Actor (Jordan Chan), Best Supporting Actress (Theresa Lee), Best Cinematography (Arthur Wong), Best Action Choreography (Ma Yuk-sing) and Best Original Music (Peter Kam). Peter Cheung and Cheung Ka-fai won the Best Editing award for their work on Big Bullet.

At the 1996 Golden Horse Film Festival, Big Bullet was nominated for Best Action Choreography (Ma Yuk-sing) and won the award for Best Film Editing (Peter Cheung and Cheung Ka-fai).

== Cast ==
- Lau Ching-wan as Sergeant Bill Chu
- Jordan Chan as PC Jeff Chiu
- Theresa Lee as PC Apple
- Cheung Tat-ming as Matthew
- Francis Ng as Inspector Yeung (Bill's former boss)
- Anthony Wong as Bird
- Yu Rongguang as Professor
- Lam Sheung Yee as Senior Constable Dan (driver of EU van)
- Vincent Kok as Tung Fai
- Dayo Wong as Bill's informant
- Ruco Chan as Chiu Sai Wing (Jordan Chan's younger brother)

== See also ==
- Hong Kong films of 1996
- List of action films of the 1990s
