= Shanghai Grand =

1996 Hong Kong film by Poon Man-kit

- Hong Kong film poster
- Traditional Chinese: 新上海灘
- Simplified Chinese: 新上海滩
- Hanyu Pinyin: Xīn Shànghǎi Tān
- Jyutping: San1 Seong6 Hoi2 Taan1
- Directed by: Poon Man-kit
- Written by: Poon Man-kit; Matt Chow; Sandy Shaw
- Produced by: Tsui Hark; Tiffany Chen
- Starring: Andy Lau; Leslie Cheung; Ning Jing
- Cinematography: Poon Hang-sang
- Edited by: Marco Mak
- Music by: Wu Wai-lap; Raymond Wong
- Production companies: Win's Entertainment; Film Workshop
- Distributed by: Win's Entertainment (Hong Kong)
- Release date: 13 July 1996
- Running time: 96 minutes
- Country: Hong Kong
- Language: Cantonese
- Box office: HK$20,837,056

Shanghai Grand, also known as Shanghai Grand 1996 to differentiate this film from the 1980 television series of the same Chinese title, is a 1996 Hong Kong action crime drama film directed by Poon Man-kit and starring Andy Lau, Leslie Cheung, and Ning Jing.

This film was directed by Poon Man-kit and produced by Tsui Hark and his production company Film Workshop. It is a loose adaptation of the 1980 television series The Bund in many respects, even though it was done by narrating the action in three segments, each featuring the main characters of the film. Leslie Cheung was cast as Hui Man-keung, the original protagonist of The Bund, while Andy Lau was cast as the film's protagonist - Hui's close friend Ting Lik, a well-meaning but somewhat naive triad leader who was not amused when Hui fell in love with the same girl as the one of his affections. Ning Jing played their love interest Fung Ching-ching.

The story was set in Shanghai during the Republican era, when the city was dominated by triads shortly before it was occupied by the Japanese in the Second Sino-Japanese War.

== Plot ==
Hui Man-keung (Leslie Cheung), an agent the Taiwan People's League participates in fighting against Japanese invaders with his fellow comrades. While on their ship back to Taiwan, they were ambushed by the Japanese troops (with the help of a traitor), who want the list of all the nationalists. Hui becomes seriously injured in a gunfight with the Japanese and falls in the water, and ends up in Shanghai and is found by Ting Lik (Andy Lau), a young, low-class labourer but dreams being a powerful triad leader. Ting takes Hui back to his home while confiscating the latter's revolver.

Ting has a crush on major triad leader Fung King-yiu's (Wu Hsing-kuo) daughter, Fung Ching-ching (Ning Jing), and purchases two film tickets of Gone with the Wind for her and her teacher, Man-lai (Amanda Lee). However, rival triad leader Shorty Chiu attempts to abduct Ching-ching and Ting rescues her and beats up Chiu and trapping him under a truck. This angers Wing, Chiu's boss and leader of the Axe Gang, who sets Ting's house on fire and demands Ting to settle the score in person. Hui saves Ting's mother from the fire and Ting befriends him and promises to take him under his wing while returning him his revolver.

Ting and Hui meet with Wing, but they were held with axes to them by Wing's underlings. Wing chops off Ting's right pinky, but Ting's friend, gives Hui his revolver from outside the window and Hui shoots Wing. Together, Ting and Hui kill Wing's underlings before pushing Wing out the window falling to his death. Fung's butler, Uncle Lau (Lau Shun), bribes the police to prevent Ting and Hui's arrest and Fung puts Ting in charge of Wing's territories and Ting rises up as an influential triad leader in Shanghai. Ting becomes more and more ambitious and kills another triad leader and the police chief while also expresses his love for Ching-ching and wins Fung's approval. At this time, Ting unexpectedly finds Hui and Ching-ching showering together at the former's home. It turns out Hui and Ching-ching met during the summer last year in Northeast China while the former was being chased by the Japanese and had a brief romance but he did not know her name and was shocked she was the woman who Ting was in love with. It turns while Ting was writing love letters to Ching-ching, Lai-man was pretending to be Ching-ching writing letters to Ting and is in love with him.

Before reuniting with Ching-ching, Hui notices Man-lai's cheongsam being similar to a Japanese female assassin (Almen Wong) who tried to kill on the ship earlier which leads him to a clothing shop where he is ambushed by the said assassin and some henchmen. Hui kills several henchmen in a gunfight before fleeing with Ching-ching to his home where Ting encounters them. Hui tries to explain his relationship with Ching-ching to Ting, but Ting rebuts him. Hui says he will leave Shanghai with Ching-ching once he settles his business and Ting warns him to take care of Ching-ching or he will kill him. At the time, other members of the People's League find Hui and suspects him to be a traitor due to the incident on the ship, but Hui claims to know who the traitor is and persuades them to give him chance to kill the traitor and avenge their comrades.

Fung arranges Ting to meet with a business partner, which is actually a trap for his assassin (the Japanese female assassin who tried to kill Hui) to kill Ting as Fung thinks Ting is too ambitious and sees him as a threat. The assassin attempts to strangle Ting with a phyton snake, but Ting shocks the snake with a chandelier, causing it strangles the assassin instead. At this time, Fung also invites Hui to his mansion where Hui recognizes Fung as the traitor at the ship. Fung also discovers Hui's true identity and orders his henchmen to kill him, but Hui ends up killing Fung instead while Ching-ching goes insane after witnessing it. Uncle Lau pleads Ting to care for Ching-ching as well as avenging Fung as everyone in Shanghai is fighting to kill Hui. Ting arranges a meeting with Hui in his bar on New Years Eve where Ting tells Hui the latter broke his promise to take care of Ching-ching. Right after countdown, the two engage in a Mexican standoff with Ting on the upper hand as Hui was shooting blanks as he wanted to repay his "debt" to Ting. Ting also intentionally misses shooting at vital organs and arranges Hui to safely leave Shanghai. Ting walks out his bar and tells Fung's former underlings he has killed Hui, which is overhead by a People's League agent (Jung Woo-sung), who shoots Ting dead before he himself was gunned down by Ting's underlings.

== Cast ==
- Andy Lau as Ting Lik (丁力), an ambitious labourer who dreams of being a major triad leader. After killing Axe Gang leader Boss Wing, he reaches his dreams and rises up as a powerful triad leader, gaining fame and fortune.
- Leslie Cheung as Hui Man-keung (許文強), an agent of the Taiwan People's League (台灣民族同盟會) who is determined to eliminate Japanese troops who intend to invade China.
- Ning Jing as Fung Ching-ching (馮程程), daughter of Shanghai's biggest crime lord, Fung King-yiu, and object of affection for Ting and Hui, although she is in love with the latter.
- Wu Hsing-kuo as Fung King-yiu (馮敬堯), Shanghai's most powerful crime lord who is a traitor for the Japanese.
- Lau Shun as Uncle Lau (柳叔), Fung's butler.
- Amanda Lee as Lai-man (麗文老師), Ching-ching's personal teacher who has a crush on Ting.
- Almen Wong as a Japanese female assassin who works for Fung.
- Chan Kin-yat as "Shorty" Chiu (矮仔超), a cocky triad leader who looks down on Ting and belittles him.
- Jung Woo-sung as an agent of theTaiwan People's League.
- Lee Kin-yan as Ting Lik's henchman.
- Tse Liu-shut as Ting Lik's henchman.
- Yip Chun as Brother Four (四哥), a triad leader who was assassinated by Ting.
- Wong Ming-sing as Fung King-yiu's henchman.
- Ng Fei-kit
- Leung Ka-chun
- Cheung Kam-bon
- Pak Ham-yat
- Ngai Tsang-siu

== Box office ==
The film grossed HK$20,838,196 at the Hong Kong box office during its theatrical run from 13 July to 16 August 1996 in Hong Kong.

== Awards and nominations ==
- 16th Hong Kong Film Awards
  - Nominated: Best Action Choreography (Stephen Tung)
  - Nominated: Best Cinematography (Poon Hang-sang)
  - Nominated: Best Art Direction (Bruce Yu)

== Music ==
- Theme song: Shanghai Beach (上海灘) (Cantonese) / Most Beloved Shanghai Beach (最愛上海灘) (Mandarin)
  - Composer: Joseph Koo
  - Lyricist: James Wong
  - Arranger: Ting Chi-kwong
  - Singer: Andy Lau
- Insert theme: Sleeping Alone (一個人睡) (Cantonese) / Most Afraid of You Sleeping With Someone Else (最怕你跟别人睡) (Mandarin)
  - Composer/Lyricist: Christopher Wong
  - Arranger: Chiu Sang-hei
  - Singer: Andy Lau

== See also ==
- Andy Lau filmography
- Leslie Cheung filmography
