= Heroic Duo =

2003 Hong Kong film by Benny Chan

- Theatrical poster
- Directed by: Benny Chan
- Written by: Alan Yuen; Adrian Kwan
- Produced by: Benny Chan
- Starring: Leon Lai; Ekin Cheng; Francis Ng
- Cinematography: Anthony Pun; Ngai Man-yin
- Edited by: Cheung Ka-fai
- Music by: Tommy Wai
- Production companies: Universe Entertainment; Sil-Metropole Organisation
- Distributed by: Universe Films Distribution Company Limited
- Release date: 31 July 2003
- Country: Hong Kong
- Languages: Cantonese; Mandarin

Heroic Duo (Chinese: 雙雄) is a 2003 Hong Kong crime action film directed and produced by Benny Chan. The film stars Leon Lai, Ekin Cheng and Francis Ng.

== Plot ==
Ken Li is a senior member of the Hong Kong Police Force. He has an egocentric and overpowering personality. He is intolerant of mistakes, his underlings and girlfriend, Brenda, suffering due to his macho personality. The main action begins when Inspector Li is brought in to investigate a cop who has committed a crime. On interrogation the cop reveals that he remembers nothing since he met a man the night before. The strange circumstances lead Li to Jack Lai, who is a master hypnotist and also in jail for manslaughter after taking the rap for a murder his wife committed under duress. Jack clearly knows who is responsible but is also clear that only he can identify the culprit. Li therefore springs Jack from jail and takes him along. Although they fail to catch the criminal, it is clear from the evidence in the apartment that there is a plot to steal two Egyptian diamonds worth millions from an American named Barry Lykin.

Inadvertently hypnotized by Jack, Inspector Li retrieves the diamonds from the safe. In the process Li is chased down by another officer named Yeung. After reaching the parking lot one Ocean's men engages in a shootout with police killing several officers and Lykin who was being escorted to his car. Jack takes the diamonds and heads off to give them to Ocean, who is holding his wife hostage. Inspector Li is arrested for stealing the diamonds. His colleagues use the situation to settle some old scores. En route to jail, Inspector Li escapes by jumping from the Tsing Ma Bridge. His girlfriend, Brenda, still hopelessly in love with him, helps him to evade recapture to pursue Jack and the criminal mastermind Ocean in order to recover the diamonds.

Unpredictable and easily upset Ocean finds that Jack has double crossed him, in order to ensure compliance he places Jack's wife and his partner's children inside a vacuum chamber to slowly run out of air. Jack returns to the scene to retrieve the diamonds and runs into Inspector Li. Together with Brenda they go after Ocean. On arrival they split up to search the complex.

Jack searches desperately for his wife, finally finding her inside the locked vacuum chamber. Brenda is taken by one of Ocean's men and although Li has Ocean cornered the situation becomes desperate, as he is forced to choose between his girlfriend and taking out Ocean. Finally, Li helps Jack to cause an explosion to wipe out Ocean. They hide in the second vacuum chamber as the oxygen cylinders detonate. Able now to reach his wife, Jack desperately tries to wake her to no avail. Mortally wounded, he lays his head on her lap as he dies. His wife comes to life slowly and sees her husband, but is too late.

Li finally realizes that there is more to life than work and begins to treat his girlfriend better.

== Cast ==
- Leon Lai as Professor Jack Lai
- Ekin Cheng as Senior Inspector Ken Li
- Francis Ng as Ocean Au-yeung
- Karena Lam as Brenda
- Xu Jinglei as Mandy Cheuk
- Raymond Wong as Officer Yeung
- Anson Leung as Tom
- Samuel Pang as Chi
- Kam Hing-yin as Commander Wong
- Evergreen Mak as Officer Lau
- Kenny Wong as Senior Inspector K.L. Cheung
- Andrew Reilly as Barry Lykin
- Pete Spurrier as Auctioneer
- Griselda Yeung as University student
- Courtney Wu as Auction guest
