= Comrades: Almost a Love Story =

1996 Hong Kong film by Peter Chan

- Film poster

Chinese name
- Traditional Chinese: 甜蜜蜜
- Simplified Chinese: 甜蜜蜜
- Literal meaning: Very sweet
Transcriptions
Standard Mandarin
- Hanyu Pinyin: Tián mì mì
Yue: Cantonese
- Jyutping: Tim4 mat6 mat6
- Directed by: Peter Chan
- Written by: Ivy Ho
- Produced by: Peter Chan
- Starring: Leon Lai; Maggie Cheung
- Cinematography: Jingle Ma
- Edited by: Chan Ki-hop; Kwong Chi-Leung
- Music by: Chiu Tsang-Hei
- Production companies: Golden Movies International; United Filmakers Organization
- Distributed by: Golden Harvest
- Release date: 2 November 1996
- Running time: 116 minutes
- Country: Hong Kong
- Language: Cantonese

Comrades: Almost a Love Story (Chinese: 甜蜜蜜; lit. 'very sweet') is a 1996 Hong Kong romantic drama film directed and produced by Peter Chan, and starring Leon Lai and Maggie Cheung. The Chinese title refers to "Tian Mi Mi", a song by Teresa Teng whose songs are featured in the film. It was filmed on location in Hong Kong and New York City. Lai later commented in 1997 that the story of Li Xiao Jun is somewhat a description of his own life.

Comrades: Almost a Love Story won the Best Feature Film and Best Actress awards at the 34th Golden Horse Awards, as well as nine awards including Best Film and Best Director at the 16th Hong Kong Film Awards. In 2005, the film was voted one of the "Best 100 Chinese Motion Pictures" by the Hong Kong Film Awards Association.

== Plot ==
The film, spanning years, centres on two Chinese mainlanders who migrate to Hong Kong to make a living, but end up falling in love. Leon Lai plays a naive Northerner, Li Xiao-Jun, who moves to Hong Kong with the intention of bringing his fiancée Fang Xiaoting to Hong Kong, and Maggie Cheung plays Li Qiao, an opportunist and Cantonese speaker from Guangzhou who takes advantage of mainlanders like herself for financial gains. The loneliness of living in the big city inevitably brings the two into a passionate love affair. Li Qiao is able to succeed and steadily grows wealthier, but her savings are wiped out in the economic crash of 1987. Due to this, she is forced to take up a job as a masseuse, where she meets a wealthy mob boss named Ouyang Pao. However, because of their different ambitions (Li Xiao-Jun wants to bring his fiancée to Hong Kong; Li Qiao wants to get rich) mean that they are unable to be together. Eventually, Li Xiao-Jun marries his fiancée in Hong Kong and Li Qiao winds up in a relationship with Pao. Li Qiao also becomes a successful entrepreneur, achieving her Hong Kong dream. Despite their seemingly separate lives, they are still in love and they have one final tryst in the room they used to share before they are separated again.

Burdened by guilt and his love for Li Qiao, Xiao-Jun confesses to his wife that he has not been faithful. He then leaves Hong Kong, and becomes a cook in the United States. Pao, chased by the Hong Kong police, escapes with Li Qiao to the U.S. as illegal immigrants. After almost 10 years, Xiao-Jun and Li Qiao meet again as lonely immigrants in the U.S. (after the latter gets her Green card). By then, both of them have already been freed from their previous partners - Xiao-Jun left his wife, and Pao is killed in a mugging in the U.S. The film ends with Xiao-Jun and Li Qiao fatefully meeting each other in front of an electronic store that has a display television playing a music video by Teresa Teng, after news of the singer's death had broken. It is revealed that the two had sat back to back on their first train ride to Hong Kong.

== Cast ==
- Leon Lai as Lai Siu-gwan
- Maggie Cheung as Lee Kiu
- Eric Tsang as Au Yeung-pao
- Kristy Yang as Fong Siu-ting
- Christopher Doyle as Jeremy
- Joe Cheung as Yan
- Len Berdick as U.S. Immigration Officer
- Michelle Gabriel as Cabbage
- Irene Tsu as Rosie

== Production ==
The Chinese title of the film, 'Tian Mi Mi', comes from a song of the same name by Teresa Teng, which is famous both in mainland China and among the overseas Chinese community. The movie displays love of the famous singer who died a year before the film was released; the film is considered a love poem in memory of Teresa Teng. Her music is featured prominently throughout the film, and Teresa Teng herself is an important subplot for the movie. Leon Lai sings the title song for the ending credits. In a cameo performance, Christopher Doyle, the internationally known cinematographer famous for his collaboration with Wong Kar-wai, plays an English teacher.

Lai was mostly known as a "pop idol" at the time while Cheung was considered an "established character actress", causing some people who knew Chan to doubt their pairing. However, Chan stated that he has originally considered Faye Wong for the role based on her mainland origins, but she turned it down, leading him to cast Cheung instead.

== Release ==
Comrades: Almost a Love Story was released in Hong Kong on 2 November 1996. The film grossed a total of HK$15,557,580 on its initial theatrical run in Hong Kong.

The film was screened theatrically for the first time in nearly a decade at the Hong Kong International Film Festival in 2012 with a new 35 mm print supervised by director Peter Chan. The film was shown at the 70th Venice International Film Festival in 2013.

Initially the Mainland Chinese government put restrictions on the film, but they were lifted in 2015. As part of the Mainland Chinese release, Luhan recorded a new version of the song "Tian Mi Mi". Hua Hsu of The New Yorker states that the reasons why the film was restricted were "slight, couched in minor differences of speech and habit" and that "even the most ideological viewer would be hard pressed to interpret this as an aggressively political film."

== Reception ==
The film was very well received in Hong Kong and Taiwan, winning best picture, director, and actress for the Hong Kong Film Awards, among other wins. Maggie Cheung's performance also won general acclaim. The movie was voted #11 of the Greatest Chinese Films of all time by the Chinese Movie Database and #28 of the 100 Greatest Chinese Films by the Hong Kong Film Awards. It is also listed in the 100 Greatest Chinese Films of the 20th Century by Asia Weekly Magazine.

Richard James Havis of Asiaweek praised the film's "accomplished, oftentimes wry script", stating that it elevated the movie above the standard Hong Kong melodrama. In particular, he enjoyed Cheung's performance, believing that her "restraint" kept the film from becoming overly theatrical.

In 2011, the Taipei Golden Horse Film Festival listed Comrades: Almost a Love Story at number 16 in their list of "100 Greatest Chinese-Language Films". The majority of the voters originated from Taiwan, and included film scholars, festival programmers, film directors, actors and producers.

In 2022, American writer and critic Nick Newman placed Comrades: Almost a Love Story on his Sight and Sound list of the greatest films ever made, saying it deserves placement "solely for rendering an image of Maggie Cheung walking under Brooklyn’s J-M-Z line one of the strangest things I've ever seen."

== Accolades ==
Accolades received by In the Mood for Love
Award	Date of ceremony	Category	Recipient(s)	Result	Ref.
Asia-Pacific Film Festival	1997	Best Actress	Maggie Cheung	Won	
Golden Bauhinia Awards	1997	Best Film	Comrades: Almost a Love Story	Won	
Golden Bauhinia Awards	1997	Best Director	Peter Chan	Won	
Golden Bauhinia Awards	1997	Best Actress	Maggie Cheung	Won	
Golden Bauhinia Awards	1997	Best Supporting actor	Eric Tsang	Won	
Golden Bauhinia Awards	1997	Best Screenplay	Ivy Ho	Won	
Golden Bauhinia Awards	1997	Best Cinematography	Jingle Ma	Won	
Golden Horse Film Festival and Awards	1997	Best Feature Film	Comrades: Almost a Love Story	Won	
Golden Horse Film Festival and Awards	1997	Best Leading Actress	Maggie Cheung	Won	
Golden Horse Film Festival and Awards	1997	Best Supporting Actor	Eric Tsang	Nominated	
Hong Kong Film Awards	1997	Best Film	Comrades: Almost a Love Story	Won	
Hong Kong Film Awards	1997	Best Director	Peter Chan	Won	
Hong Kong Film Awards	1997	Best Screenplay	Ivy Ho	Won	
Hong Kong Film Awards	1997	Best Actor	Leon Lai	Nominated	
Hong Kong Film Awards	1997	Best Actress	Maggie Cheung	Won	
Hong Kong Film Awards	1997	Best Supporting Actor	Eric Tsang	Won	
Hong Kong Film Awards	1997	Best New Performer	Kristy Yeung	Nominated	
Hong Kong Film Awards	1997	Best Cinematography	Jingle Ma	Won	
Hong Kong Film Awards	1997	Best Art Direction	Kenneth Yee	Won	
Hong Kong Film Awards	1997	Best Costume Make Up Design	Dora Ng	Won	
Hong Kong Film Awards	1997	Best Original Film Score	Chiu Jun-Fun	Won	
Hong Kong Film Critics Society Award	1996	Best Film	Comrades: Almost a Love Story	Won	
Hong Kong Film Critics Society Award	1996	Best Director	Peter Chan	Won	
Hong Kong Film Critics Society Award	1996	Best Actress	Maggie Cheung	Won	
Seattle International Film Festival	1997	Golden Space Needle Award: Best Film	Comrades: Almost a Love Story	Won	
