= Finch & Midland =

- Directed by: Timothy Yeung
- Screenplay by: Timothy Yeung
- Produced by: Kim Yu
- Starring: Patrick Tam; Theresa Lee; Harriet Yeung; Anthony Wong
- Cinematography: Jeff Wong
- Edited by: Victor C.H. Fan
- Music by: Matthew O'Halloran
- Production company: Righteous Alliance Entertainment
- Distributed by: Equinoxe Films
- Release date: October 5, 2025 (VIFF)
- Running time: 105 minutes
- Countries: Canada; Hong Kong
- Languages: Cantonese; English; Mandarin

Finch & Midland is a Canadian-Hong Kong drama film, directed by Timothy Yeung and released in 2025. The film tells four distinct stories of Hong Kong immigrants living in the Scarborough district of Toronto, Ontario.

The stories centre on Dan (Patrick Tam), a former singer now reduced to working in a Chinese restaurant; Fan (Theresa Lee), who works at a grocery store and a massage parlour, while pursuing her dream of becoming a real estate agent; Eva (Harriet Yeung), who is looking for love while acting as a caretaker for her ailing mother (Nina Paw); and Tony (Anthony Wong), a supervisor at a factory who is proud of his accomplishments despite the fact that his role with the company isn't nearly as important or powerful as he thinks.

The cast also includes Dmitry Chepovetsky, Jaden Kwan, Michael Chan, Victor Chiu, Alejandro Ampudia, Vanessa Burns, Skye Sin-Yeung Chan, Kitty Chow, Kwan Tse, Richard Tse, Houston Wong and Wavy Zhao in supporting roles.

== Production ==
The film's title is a reference to the intersection of Finch and Midland Avenues in Scarborough's Agincourt neighbourhood.

The film, Yeung's full-length directorial debut, was shot in August and September 2024 in Toronto.

== Distribution ==
The film premiered on October 5, 2025, at the 2025 Vancouver International Film Festival, followed by its Hong Kong premiere on October 23 at the Hong Kong Asian Film Festival, and a screening at the Toronto Reel Asian International Film Festival.

It went into commercial release in winter 2026.

It was one of four films which were removed from eligibility for the 44th Hong Kong Film Awards, despite meeting all the eligibility criteria and having been included in the initial list of contenders. Although not confirmed by the Hong Kong Film Awards, speculation was that the film was dropped for political censorship reasons due to the presence of Anthony Wong in its cast, as he has been an outspoken supporter of Occupy Central and other political protests in Hong Kong; he also starred in one of the other dropped films, Valley of the Shadow of Death, while the other two titles starred two other actors, Fan Bingbing and Neo Yan, who have both also run afoul of the Chinese government for other reasons.

== Critical response ==
For TheGATE.ca, Andrew Parker wrote that "It’s a testament to Yeung’s clarity of vision that these stories aren’t competing for the spotlight. Although they are connected mostly by geography and ethnicity, that’s surprisingly enough to keep Finch and Midland together as a cohesive whole. All four leads commit themselves fully to their parts, with Yeung in particular putting in outstanding work as the lovesick Eva. It’s the sort of film where many viewers will be able to see friends, family members, and themselves in the characters. The struggles are both specific and universal, reaching far beyond the borders of Scarborough."

Liam Lacey of Original Cin wrote that "full credit is due to Yeung for a film filled with vivid performances and fluid, moody aesthetic, but with one reservation. The ending of Finch & Midland feels truncated rather than resolved. There are parallel culminating scenes of each of the characters, all of which involve a moment of physical touch. But we leave these four dreamers marooned between resignation and acceptance."

== Awards ==
Award	Date of ceremony	Category	Nominee	Result	Ref.
Canadian Screen Music Awards	2026	Best Original Song	Matthew O'Halloran, "Life Has No If"	Nominated	
Directors Guild of Canada	2026	Best Direction in a Feature Film	Timothy Yeung	Pending	
Directors Guild of Canada	2026	Best Picture Editing in a Feature Film	Victor C.H. Fan	Pending	
Golden Horse Film Awards	2025	Best Supporting Actor	Anthony Wong	Nominated	
