= First Option =

1996 Hong Kong film by Gordon Chan

- Film poster

Chinese name
- Traditional Chinese: 飛虎
- Simplified Chinese: 飞虎
Transcriptions
Standard Mandarin
- Hanyu Pinyin: Fēi Fǔ
Yue: Cantonese
- Jyutping: Fei1 Fu2
- Directed by: Gordon Chan
- Written by: Gordon Chan; Chan Hing-ka
- Produced by: John Chong; Kim Yip
- Starring: Michael Wong; Gigi Leung
- Cinematography: Horace Wong
- Edited by: Chan Ki-hop
- Music by: Chan Kwong-wing
- Production companies: Media Asia Films; People's Productions Limited
- Distributed by: Media Asia Distributions
- Release date: 14 September 1996
- Running time: 90 minutes
- Country: Hong Kong
- Languages: Cantonese; English; Thai

First Option is a 1996 Hong Kong action war film directed by Gordon Chan, who also wrote with Chan Hing-ka. The film stars Michael Wong and Gigi Leung. The film was released theatrically in Hong Kong on 14 September 1996. It was entered into the 20th Moscow International Film Festival.

== Synopsis ==
The film depicts the struggle between the Customs and Excise Department (Hong Kong) and the Royal Hong Kong Police Force 's Special Duties Unit ( Flying Tigers ) and drug trafficking syndicates. When officers from the Customs Narcotics Investigation Bureau raided drug trafficking strongholds, they missed the main criminal, known as the "Asian Ice Queen." Next, the special mission company followed the intelligence and came to the abandoned factory, but was ambushed by landmines and snipers . The special mission company suffered heavy losses. At the same time, it was also investigated that the bullets shot by the personnel turned out to be special firearms owned by the police . hair. Later, it was discovered that Don's friend, Rick, an agent of the U.S. Drug Enforcement Administration (DEA), was actually the real leader of the drug gang. He was preparing to transport drugs out to sea. Special Task Company personnel and customs officers went deep into the jungle of an outlying island to work with the SEALs. After fighting, Rick was finally captured.

== Cast ==
- Michael Wong as SDU Commander Chief Inspector Don Wong
- Gigi Leung as Customs Probation Inspector Minnie Kwan
- Damian Lau as RHKP Senior Superintendent Lau (guest star)
- Lee Fung as Customs Superintendent Madam Katie Ngan
- Kathy Chow as Sue, Assistant Custom Inspector Minnie
- Joseph Cheung as Joe Cheung, Partner Inspector Don Wong
- Kim Yip as Forensics tech
- Stephen Chan as RHKP Narcotics Bureau, Inspector Lau
- Richard Grosse as Rick, agent Drug Enforcement Administration and friend Don however he mastermind drug syndicate.

== Home media ==
On 30 June 2003, the DVD was released by Hong Kong Legends in the United Kingdom in Region 2.

== See also ==
- List of Hong Kong films
