= Theresa Lee =

Hong Kong-born Canadian actress

Theresa Lee Yee Hung
- Born: February 25, 1970 (age 56); Hong Kong
- Other names: Lee Yee-hung, Lee Yi Hung
- Education: University of Alberta
- Occupations: Actress; TV presenter
- Years active: 1994–2013
- Spouse: Corey Solomonson (m. 2004)

Chinese name
- Traditional Chinese: 李綺虹
- Simplified Chinese: 李绮虹
Transcriptions
Standard Mandarin
- Hanyu Pinyin: Lǐ Qǐhóng
Yue: Cantonese
- Jyutping: Lei^{5} Ji^{2}-hung^{4}

Theresa Lee is a Hong Kong-born Canadian actress.

== Career ==
Lee started her acting career in Hong Kong after placing second runner-up in the 1994 Miss Hong Kong Pageant. Most of her acting career has been in Greater China, but she has also appeared in notable North American films and TV series.

== Filmography ==
=== Films ===
Year	Title	Role	Notes
1996	Big Bullet (衝鋒隊怒火街頭)	Apple	Nominated—Hong Kong Film Award for Best Supporting Actress
1996	Who's the Woman, Who's the Man? (金枝玉葉2)	O	Nominated—Hong Kong Film Award for Best Supporting Actress; Nominated—Hong Kong Film Award for Best New Performer
1996	What a Wonderful World (奇異旅程之真心愛生命)	Chu	
1996	They Don't Care About Us (少年15/16時)	Brenda Lee	
1997	Intimates (自梳)	Wai	Nominated—Golden Horse Award for Best Supporting Actress; Nominated—Hong Kong Film Award for Best Supporting Actress
1997	Love Is Not a Game, But a Joke (飛一般愛情小說)	Pumpkin	
1997	03:00 AM (夜半3點鐘)	reporter	
1998	Downtown Torpedoes (神偷諜影)	Phoenix	Nominated—Hong Kong Film Award for Best Supporting Actress
1998	The Poet (顧城別戀)	Rei Mi	
1998	Extreme Crisis (B計劃)	Insp. Ching	
1998	Love & Let Love! (生死戀)	Terry Ho	
1998	Timeless Romance (超時空要愛)	Gigi	
1999	Deja Vu (緣份2000)	Szeto Hung	
1999	Purple Storm (紫雨風暴)	Cindy	
2000	When I Fall in Love... with Both (月亮的秘密)	Cherry	
2001	Lunch with Charles	April	
2003	Sai Kung Story (西貢的童話)	Gee	
2008	Son of the Dragon	Ting Ting	
2011	Happy Adventure (開心大冒險)	Jade	
2013	Finding Mr. Right (北京遇上西雅圖)	Dr. Tang	
2013	Christmas Rose (聖誕玫瑰)	Miss Law	
2013	New Red River Valley (新紅河谷)	Pure	
2025	Finch & Midland	Fan	

=== Television ===
Year	Title	Role	Notes
1994	Fate of the Clairvoyant (再見亦是老婆)		
1994	Class of Distinction (阿Sir早晨)	Fong Tung Sam	
1994	Mind Our Own Business (開心華之里)	Szeto Yee Hung	
1995	The Condor Heroes 95 (神雕俠侶)	Kwok Seung	
1996	In the Name of Love (有肥人終成眷屬)	Tin Yeon Hou	
1999	The Legendary Siblings (絕代雙驕)	Zhang Jing	
2000	Beggars and Choosers	actress	
2001	Legendary Fighter: Yang's Heroine (楊門女將—女兒當自強)	Yang Paifeng	
2001	Master Swordsman Lu Xiaofeng (陸小鳳之決戰前後)	Shangguan Feiyan	
2003	Stargate SG-1	interpreter	Season 7: Episode "Fragile Balance"
2003	South Shaolin (南少林)	Zhuo Ling	
2003	All's Well, Ends Well (花田囍事)	Lau Yuk-yin	
2004	Hero on the Silk Road (絲路豪俠)	Xie Tianqin	
2006	Beautiful Dream-Chasers (美丽追梦人)	Zhou Lin	
2007	Smallville	lab tech	Season 7: Episode "Kara"
2009	You're Hired (絕代商驕)	Melissa	
2010	Stories of Bao Sangu (包三姑外傳)	Bao Sangu	
2010	My Better Half (老公萬歲)	Gigi	
2011	ICAC Investigators 2011 (廉政行動2011)	Shum Ji Man	
2011	Hiccups	Chou Chou	Season 2: Episode "Flirt Locker"
2011	R.L. Stine's The Haunting Hour	ghost	Season 2: Episode "Bad Feng Shui"
2011	Psych	reporter	Season 6: 2 episodes

== See also ==
- Natalie Wong
