= Zhuang Nu =

Taiwanese lyricist

Zhuang Nu 莊奴
- Born: 26 February 1921; Beijing, Republic of China
- Died: 11 October 2016 (aged 95); Chongqing, China
- Occupation: Lyricist

Chinese name
- Traditional Chinese: 莊奴
- Simplified Chinese: 庄奴
Transcriptions
Standard Mandarin
- Hanyu Pinyin: Zhuāng Nú
- Wade–Giles: Chuang Nu

Wang Jingxi
- Traditional Chinese: 王景羲
Transcriptions
Standard Mandarin
- Hanyu Pinyin: Wáng Jǐngxī
- Wade–Giles: Wang Ching-Hsi

Zhuang Nu (traditional Chinese: 莊奴; simplified Chinese: 庄奴; pinyin: Zhuāng Nú; 22 February 1921 – 11 October 2016) is the pen name of Wang Jingxi (Chinese: 王景羲; pinyin: Wáng Jǐngxī), a Taiwanese lyricist.

== Career ==
Wang Jingxi was born in Beijing in 1921, and was admitted to the Beiping Zhonghua Journalism Academy (北平中華新聞學院) in 1939. After that, he was admitted to the Air Force Mechanical School in Chengdu to study ground handling. Later, in order to conceal his identity, he changed his name to Huang He (黃河). After graduating in 1945, he went to Wuhan Airport. In the same year, Japan surrendered. Because of his literary and artistic attainments, he was transferred to the Army Cultural and Industrial Corps.

In 1949, Huang He came to Taiwan with the Republic of China Army. He initially worked in the newspaper Jing Zhong Bao (精忠報) under the Army Headquarters. In his spare time, he published articles and poems in the newspaper and wrote lyrics for military songs. The Pen name Zhuang Nu (莊奴) is derived from a passage in a poem by the Song dynasty poet Zhao Buzhi (晁補之), "I am willing to become a slave and serve the public. As a slave uses a plow, I use a pen to plow and write honestly." In 1952, the military song Heroes on the Patriotic Battlefield won the May 4th Literature and Art Award. In 1982, he won the 18th National Army Art Awards.

In 1958, Tiannan Film Company started filming the song and dance film The Love of the Barbarian in Water (水擺夷之戀). Composer Zhou Lanping (周藍萍) took the initiative to recommend to the director Tang Shaohua (唐紹華) the writing of a stranger Zhuang Nu; Tang Shaohua appreciated Zhuang Nu's I want to marry a Han Chinese man (願嫁漢家郞) and 18 year old girl is a flower (姑娘十八一朵花) and praised Zhou Lanping's vision; since then, Zhuang Nu has formally written lyrics for Mandarin Chinese songs.

The composers that Zhuang Nu has collaborated with the most times are Zuo Hongyuan (左宏元, commonly used under the pen name "Gu Yue" (古月)) and Weng Qingxi (翁淸溪, commonly used under the pen name "Tony" (湯尼)). Songs written by Zhuangnu include Tian mi mi, a song by Teresa Teng, which is a reinterpretation of an Indonesian folk song. In 1990, she was awarded the Special Contribution Award at the 1st Golden Melody Awards. He also wrote lyrics for over 3,000 songs.

In 1992, Zhuang Nu married a Chongqing woman, Zou Lin (鄒麟), and has since traveled frequently between Taiwan and Chongqing. In 2012, Zhuang Nu was awarded the title of "Honorary Citizen" by the Chongqing Municipal People's Government and settled in Bishan District, At 6:11 a.m. in the morning on 11 October 2016, Zhuang Nu died at the First Affiliated Hospital of Chongqing Medical University, enjoying his senior life at the age of 95.
