= Gambang kromong =

Indonesian traditional orchestra

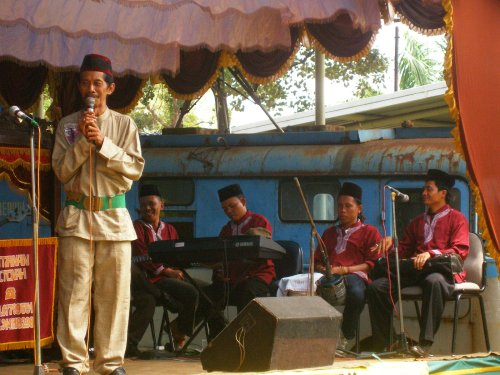
Gambang Kromong

Gambang kromong is a traditional orchestra of Betawi people which is a blend of gamelan, Western music and Chinese-style pentatonic base tones. Gambang kromong is closely associated with the Chinese Betawi community, especially the Chinese Peranakan, most of whom originated in southern Fujian. It was popular in the 1930s.

== Instruments ==
Gambang kromong orchestral instruments consist of: gambang kayu (a xylophone-like instrument), kromong (a set of 5 toned bonang), two Chinese rebab-like instruments called ohyan and gihyan with its resonator made out of a small coconut shell, a diatonic pitched flute that is blown crosswise, kenong and gendang drums. Western instruments such as trumpets, guitars, violins, and saxophones may also be included.

== History ==
Nie Hoe Kong, Kapitein der Chinezen, a musician and Dutch-appointed leader of the Chinese community in mid-18th-century Batavia, is considered one of the early figures who developed the Gambang kromong.

In its first appearance in Batavia, the orchestra was called gambang. Later in the beginning of the 20th century, they began to use additional instruments, the bonang or kromong, so it is called gambang kromong. During that period, almost every part of Batavia had a gambang kromong orchestra.

Gambang Kromong reached its peak of popularity around 1937. One of the popular groups was Gambang Kromong Ngo Hong Lao, whose players were all ethnic Chinese people. The instruments used in the orchestral group were considered to be the most extensive. For the wealthy Chinese, it was a custom to liven up a party by calling a gambang kromong orchestra, usually accompanying a song. Gambang kromong was also performed during the Cap Go Meh festival, sometimes with plays.

== Characteristics ==
Gambang kromong used the Chinese pentatonic scale instead of the local slendro tuning system typically used by Javanese, Sundanese, or Balinese gamelans. The set appears in the xylophone-like instrument gambang, used in the orchestra.

In addition to accompanying songs, Gambang Kromong usually accompanies social dances such as the Cokek dance, a newly created performance dance as well as in Lenong theatre.
